= 2009–10 Stevenage Borough F.C. season =

Stevenage Borough F.C.
2009–10 season
- Chairman: Phil Wallace
- Manager: Graham Westley
- Conference Premier: 1st (promoted)
- FA Cup: First round
- FA Trophy: Runners-up
- Top goalscorer: League: Yemi Odubade (14); All: Yemi Odubade (16)
- Highest home attendance: 7,024 (v Luton Town, Conference Premier, 3 April 2010)
- Lowest home attendance: 678 (v Vauxhall Motors, FA Trophy, 19 January 2010)

The 2009–10 season was Stevenage Borough F.C.'s 16th season in the Conference Premier. This article shows statistics of the club's players in the season, and also lists all matches that the club played during the season. Their fifth-place finish and subsequent play-off semi-final defeat in the 2008–09 season meant it was their sixteenth successive season of playing in the Conference Premier. It also marked the second year in charge for manager Graham Westley during his second spell at the club; having previously managed the Hertfordshire club from 2003 to 2006.

The majority of the squad from the 2008–09 season were retained, with little transfer activity in comparison to previous seasons. Steve Morison, the club's top goalscorer for the past three seasons, moved to Millwall for a fee of £130,000, while both John Martin and Calum Willock were released in late May 2009. Midfielder Gary Mills was the last departure of the close season; rejecting a contract and instead opting to join fellow Conference Premier club Mansfield Town. Five players joined the club during the close season. Charlie Griffin was the first signing of the season, joining Stevenage from Salisbury City on a free transfer. Yemi Odubade, Chris Beardsley, and Joel Byrom signed for the club shortly after; the latter for a transfer fee of £15,000. The last signing of pre-season was Stacy Long; who joined the club on a free transfer from Ebbsfleet United. No players departed the club during the season, with Tim Sills the only addition, signing for an undisclosed fee from Torquay United in January 2010.

Stevenage started the season by recording just one win from their first five games of the season. Following a 2–1 defeat to Oxford United in August 2009, the team went on a 17-game unbeaten run from August to December 2009, moving the club into the top two in the league standings. A 4–1 victory against Cambridge United on New Year's Day meant that Stevenage were in first place for the first time in the season. Two defeats away from home within the space of a week in February meant that Oxford United had an eight–point lead going into March 2010. The team responded by winning eight games consecutively; including a 1–0 victory against Oxford United in late March, subsequently replacing Oxford at the top of the league table. Stevenage earned promotion to the Football League with two games to spare following a 2–0 victory against Kidderminster Harriers at Aggborough. The team won their last six games of the league season without conceding a goal, and recorded 42 points from a possible 45 from their last fifteen league fixtures. Stevenage finished the season having amassed a total of 99 points from 44 games, winning the league by 11 points.

The club also played in the final of the FA Trophy against Barrow – losing 2–1 after extra–time; it was Stevenage's third visit to Wembley Stadium in four seasons. Yemi Odubade finished as the club's top goalscorer for the season after scoring 16 goals, 14 of which came in the league and two in the FA Trophy. Scott Laird, who played 53 games throughout the season, more than any other player in the squad, was named as Player of the Year.

== Squad details ==
Last updated on 18 April 2010. The squad at the end of the season.

=== Players information ===
No.	Name	Nationality	Position	Date of birth (age)	Signed from	Notes
Goalkeepers
1	Ashley Bayes	(England)	GK	19 April 1972 (age 54)	Crawley Town	
16	Chris Day	(England)	GK	28 July 1975 (age 51)	Millwall	
Defenders
3	Scott Laird	(England)	LB	15 May 1988 (age 38)	Plymouth Argyle	
4	Eddie Odhiambo	(Tanzania)	RB	15 September 1983 (age 43)	Oxford United	
5	Jon Ashton	(England)	CB	4 October 1982 (age 44)	Grays Athletic	
6	Mark Albrighton	(England)	CB	6 March 1976 (age 50)	Cambridge United	
14	Mark Roberts (c)	(England)	CB	16 October 1983 (age 43)	Northwich Victoria	
25	Ronnie Henry	(England)	RB	20 January 1984 (age 42)	Dublin City	
Midfielders
2	Lawrie Wilson	(England)	RM	11 February 1987 (age 39)	Colchester United	
7	Darren Murphy	(Republic of Ireland)	CM	28 July 1985 (age 41)	Cork City	
8	Stacy Long	(England)	CM	11 January 1985 (age 41)	Ebbsfleet United	
13	Joel Byrom	(England)	CM	14 September 1986 (age 40)	Northwich Victoria	
18	David Bridges	(England)	CM	22 September 1982 (age 44)	Kettering Town	
21	Mitchell Cole	(England)	LM	6 October 1985 (age 41)	Southend United	
23	Andy Drury	(England)	RM	12 August 1983 (age 43)	Lewes	
24	Michael Bostwick	(England)	CM	17 May 1988 (age 38)	Ebbsfleet United	
30	Peter Vincenti	(England)	CM	7 July 1986 (age 40)	Millwall	
Forwards
9	Charlie Griffin	(England)	FW	25 June 1979 (age 47)	Salisbury City	
10	Lee Boylan	(England)	FW	2 September 1978 (age 48)	Cambridge United	
11	Yemi Odubade	(Nigeria)	FW	4 July 1984 (age 42)	Oxford United	
17	Tim Sills	(England)	FW	10 September 1979 (age 47)	Torquay United	
20	Chris Beardsley	(England)	FW	28 February 1984 (age 42)	Kettering Town	

=== Management ===
- Manager: Graham Westley
- Assistant manager: John Dreyer
- First team coach: Dino Maamria
- Goalkeeping coach: Ali Uzunhasanoglu
- Fitness coach: Neil Withington
- Physiotherapist: Paul Dando

== Match results ==
=== Legend ===
Win	Draw	Loss

=== Pre-season ===
On 3 June, Stevenage Borough announced that their pre-season campaign would consist of seven friendlies to open the 2009–10 season. Stevenage Borough began their pre-season schedule on 15 July with a trip to Melbourne Stadium in Essex to play Chelmsford City. All five of Graham Westley's summer signings featured in the match, with both Charlie Griffin and Chris Beardsley getting on the scoresheet in a 2–1 victory. Three days later Borough hosted League One outfit Brighton & Hove Albion in their first pre-season friendly at Broadhall Way. Stevenage won the game 2–1 despite trailing at the half-time interval. Second-half goals from Mitchell Cole and Stacy Long secured the turn-around and a second pre-season victory. With their pre-season schedule well underway, Stevenage then travelled to Southern League Premier Division side Cambridge City for their third pre-season friendly on 21 July. The game ended 1–1, with both sides scoring a penalty a-piece; Lee Boylan successfully converting after David Bridges was adjudged to have been fouled in the penalty area.

Stevenage then hosted three Football League sides at Broadhall Way within the space of six days. Firstly, Borough entertained Millwall on 25 July as part of the £130,000 deal that took ex-Stevenage striker Steve Morison to The Den in May 2009. Stevenage lost the game 2–1, with a goal from Mitchell Cole sandwiched in between two from Morison for Millwall. Borough then hosted Peterborough United, who annually visit Broadhall Way as part of the deal that took winger George Boyd to the Cambridgeshire based club in January 2007. Stevenage lost the game 2–0, with Shaun Batt, who came through the youth system at Stevenage, scoring one of the goals. Borough midfielder Mitchell Cole was also stretchered off with an ankle injury in the first half of the same game. Later that week, it was announced that utility player Peter Vincenti had gone on a three-month loan deal to recently relegated Conference South side Woking. On 31 July, Stevenage played League One club Southend United. Stevenage won the game 2–1, with two first half goals from Joel Byrom and Darren Murphy. The following day, Stevenage played out a 0–0 draw with Conference South side Woking in their final pre-season fixture. Despite joining Woking on-loan, Peter Vincenti featured for his parent club, whilst former Mansfield Town winger Nathan Arnold also played a part in the match. However, it was announced that Vincenti's loan deal to Woking had fallen through after Borough boss Graham Westley decided he wants to keep the player as cover. On 3 August, Championship side Peterborough United announced that left-back Danny Blanchett would start a two-day trial at Broadhall Way. On 5 August, just three days before the start of the new Conference Premier campaign, striker Jerome Anderson joined Southern League Premier Division outfit Brackley Town on loan. On 7 August, Westley announced that Stevenage had signed Danny Blanchett on loan from Peterborough United.

Game	Date	Opponent	Venue	Result	Attendance	Goalscorers	Notes
1	15 July 2009	Chelmsford City	Away	2–1	391	Griffin, Beardsley	
2	18 July 2009	Brighton & Hove Albion	Home	2–1	839	Cole (pen), Long	
3	21 July 2009	Cambridge City	Away	1–1	168	Boylan (pen)	
4	25 July 2009	Millwall	Home	1–2	1,087	Cole (pen)	
5	28 July 2009	Peterborough United	Home	0–2	1,012		
6	31 July 2009	Southend United	Home	2–1	720	Byrom, Murphy	
7	1 August 2009	Woking	Away	0–0	488		

- Note: Stevenage Borough goals come first.

=== Conference Premier ===
The 2009–10 Conference Premier fixtures were released on 3 July 2009, with Stevenage Borough to open their campaign against Conference North champions Tamworth on 8 August 2009. The game ended 1–1, with Stevenage taking the lead early on in the first-half thanks to a Lee Boylan penalty after Scott Laird was adjudged to have been fouled in the box. Tamworth equalised before the interval courtesy of a Bradley Pritchard strike. Manager Graham Westley handed debuts to Stacy Long, Charlie Griffin, Yemi Odubade and Joel Byrom during the game, with the latter being sent-off after receiving a second caution in the closing stages of the match.

This was followed up with another 1–1 draw at newly promoted Conference South play-off winners Hayes and Yeading on 11 August. Stevenage opened the scoring in the second-half through midfielder Andy Drury, but were pegged back ten minutes later following good work from ex-Borough winger Dale Binns, who set-up Danny Allen-Page to finish from close range. Stevenage then drew their third game within the space of a week, playing out a 0–0 stalemate with Barrow at Holker Street. Three days later, Borough recorded their first win of the 2009–10 season, with a 3–0 victory over Ebbsfleet United at Broadhall Way. Chris Beardsley scored on his debut after just 10 minutes, with Joel Byrom and Lawrie Wilson adding to Stevenage's tally courtesy of two second-half goals. Stevenage lost their first game of the season on 22 August, losing 2–1 against Oxford United at the Kassam Stadium, with Yemi Odubade scoring his first goal for Borough deep into injury-time. A week later, Stevenage beat Rushden & Diamonds 2–1, with goals from Lee Boylan and Michael Bostwick after Cliff Akurang had equalised for the away side. The visitors played the majority of the game with 10-men, having had Michael Corcoran sent-off for a tackle on Lawrie Wilson, which resulted in the latter suffering a dislocated ankle and broken leg in three places. The Hertfordshire side then gained their first away win of the season two days later, with a 2–0 victory against Histon despite playing the majority of the game with ten men after Peter Vincenti was sent-off in the sixth minute for violent conduct. However, goals from both Scott Laird and Eddie Odhiambo secured the three points. Daniel Wright also missed a penalty for the home side late on. This was followed up with a third successive victory against Eastbourne Borough at Broadhall Way eight days later. Jon Ashton scored his first goal in Stevenage colours, heading in from Joel Byrom's corner. Ronnie Henry then doubled the home side's lead in the second-half following good work from Mitchell Cole.

A fourth successive victory followed four days later as Stevenage ran out 3–2 winners at Field Mill against Mansfield Town, ending Mansfield's unbeaten home record in 2009. The home side went 2–0 up thanks to two goals from Kyle Perry in the first fifteen minutes. Perry was then sent-off for violent conduct just before half-time; stamping on Stevenage striker Lee Boylan ultimately resulting in the latter having to be substituted. Chris Beardsley pulled a goal back for the visitors in first-half injury time, before substitutes Yemi Odubade and Charlie Griffin scored second-half strikes to complete the comeback. A week later, a fifth successive win followed as a Michael Bostwick strike seven minutes into the game was enough to ensure Stevenage beat Chester City 1–0 at the Deva Stadium. The following Tuesday, Stevenage drew 1–1 with Essex outfit Grays Athletic. Petar Rnkovic gave the visitors the lead fifteen minutes into the match, with Lee Boylan equalising later on in the first-half. Another home draw followed, as Stevenage drew 1–1 with Altrincham. New signing Michael Brough started, after joining the club on a month's loan. Robbie Williams gave the away side the lead in the first half before Michael Bostwick scored an injury-time equaliser following good work down the left-hand side from Scott Laird to ensure Stevenage stretched their unbeaten home record to 23 games. After two successive draws, Stevenage beat Luton Town 1–0 at Kenilworth Road thanks to an 85th-minute strike from Scott Laird, who fired into the top right hand corner of the net on the over-lap. Stevenage made it nine games unbeaten with a hard-fought 1–1 draw against York City at Bootham Crescent. Borough took the lead through a Daniel Parslow own goal in the first-half, before the home side equalised late on in the second period through Djoumin Sangaré.

The Hertfordshire outfit made it 10 games unbeaten with a 4–0 victory over Hayes & Yeading. Striker Charlie Griffin scored twice in the first-half, and completed his hat-trick from the penalty spot in the 70th minute. Michael Bostwick added a fourth in injury-time. Another victory followed a week later, as Stevenage beat Salisbury City 3–1 at Broadhall Way. Mark Roberts scored his first goal of the season on his 50th appearance for the club just before the interval, before the visitors levelled through substitute Chris Flood after half-time. Charlie Griffin scored his fourth goal in two games to give the Hertfordshire outfit the lead, before Chris Beardsley added a third with his first touch after good work from Yemi Odubade. Three days later, the side drew 0–0 with Wrexham at Broadhall Way. Another draw followed 10 days later, as Stevenage drew 1–1 with Kettering Town at Rockingham Road. Joel Byrom gave Borough the lead courtesy of a second-minute free-kick. The home side equalised in the latter stages of the first-half through Moses Ashikodi to ensure a share of the spoils. After a two-week break from the league, Stevenage got back to winning ways with a 5–3 win over Gateshead at Broadhall Way. The visitors took the lead seven minutes before half-time, Charlie Griffin heading into his own net following Craig Baxter's dangerous free-kick. Two minutes later Griffin atoned for his error by finishing neatly over Paul Farman. Stevenage took the lead five minutes later; Mitchell Cole providing Yemi Odubade with a simple tap-in; his first goal at Broadhall Way. On the stroke of half-time Griffin headed in Scott Laird's inviting cross to ensure a two-goal lead going into the break. However, the away side pulled a goal back through Daryl Clare, before Griffin completed his hat-trick with a drilled free-kick that went in off the post. Clare pounced on a fumbled free-kick to make it 4–3, before Michael Bostwick scored his fifth goal of the season to make it 5–3. Stevenage then travelled to The New Lawn to face Forest Green Rovers a week later. Lee Boylan's fourth-minute goal ultimately proved to be the winner as Borough ran out 1–0 winners.

This was followed up with a 2–0 mid-week victory over Chester City at Broadhall Way. In what was a comfortable, but unspectacular, game, Stevenage took the lead through Yemi Odubade, who fired in following Mark Roberts' knock down just before half-time. Borough doubled their lead on the hour mark, with Mark Roberts firing home with his back to goal in the box. Four days later, Stevenage won their fourth consecutive league game with a 1–0 win away at Salisbury City, with Charlie Griffin scoring just before half-time. Borough suffered a second league defeat at the hands of Ebbsfleet United at Stonebridge Road. Stevenage took the lead through a deflected effort from Yemi Odubade, but two second-half strikes from Stefan Bailey secured the home side a valuable victory. Four days later, Stevenage returned to winning ways with a 2–0 victory over Kidderminster Harriers at Broadhall Way, with goals from Jon Ashton and Mitchell Cole.

As a result of a postponed league fixture at home to Barrow due to snow, which was originally scheduled to be played on 19 December, Borough did not play again in the league again until Boxing Day, away at Cambridge United. Despite going a goal behind early on, Stevenage won the match 3–1. A Danny Crow penalty in the sixth minute put the hosts in front after Mark Albrighton was deemed to have tugged Chris Holroyd's shirt in the box. Borough responded well and, twenty minutes later, earned a penalty of their own when Yemi Odubade was sliced down in the box. The striker dusted himself down and duly tucked away the spot-kick to draw the visitors level. A minute later, Cambridge were reduced to ten men, when Wayne Hatswell was sent-off for a two-footed lunge on Chris Beardsley. Stevenage took the lead ten minutes into the second-half when Charlie Griffin slotted home from an acute angle, before Chris Beardsley added a third with a neat finish after good work from Ronnie Henry. Two days later, the side drew 0–0 with AFC Wimbledon at Broadhall Way.

On 1 January 2010, Borough entertained Cambridge United in the reverse fixture from Boxing Day. The game ended 4–1 to Stevenage, with Yemi Odubade, Chris Beardsley and a Lee Boylan brace ensuring the home side earned a comfortable win. Three weeks later, Stevenage beat Kettering Town 2–0 at Broadhall Way. Borough took the lead just after the hour mark when substitute Tim Sills headed the ball into the path of Stacy Long, who rifled the ball past Nathan Abbey from just outside the area. Long doubled his tally in injury-time, rounding Abbey to slide the ball home. Stevenage lost their third league match of the season at The Lamb Ground; a 1–0 defeat to Tamworth, a game in which both Ronnie Henry and Darren Murphy were sent-off. Three days later, Borough bounced back with a 3–1 victory over Mansfield Town at Broadhall Way. Stevenage trailed at the interval thanks to a Jon Shaw strike just before half-time. But Yemi Odubade, who also missed a late penalty, fired Borough level from 15 yards after the break and his low drive from the edge of the box gave Borough the lead. Substitute Andy Drury's strike sealed the win and Mansfield's misery was complete when Luke Jones was sent off. Stevenage lost their second successive away game, losing 1–0 at Rushden & Diamonds. Ten days later, Borough picked up a 1–0 win in North Wales against Wrexham thanks to a goal from David Bridges just before the interval.

A week later, at the beginning of March, Stevenage won their second away game on the bounce; beating Eastbourne Borough 6–0. Captain Mark Roberts gave Stevenage the lead just before the break, following a well-worked free-kick involving both Joel Byrom and Scott Laird. After the interval, Stevenage doubled their lead when David Bridges headed in Joel Byrom's cross. It was three shortly after following a mistake from Eastbourne goalkeeper Danny Knowles, Chris Beardsley blocked the goalkeepers clearance and slid the ball into an empty net. It got worse for the home side ten minutes from time when Beardsley chased a long through ball and was hauled down by Darren Baker just inside the area – the defender being shown a straight red. Substitute Mitchell Cole slotted the penalty home, before adding another after good work from Eddie Odhiambo. Cole completed his hat-trick moments later slotting home Stacy Long's through ball. A third successive victory followed in a 2–0 win at home to Crawley Town. In a tight game, Stevenage took the lead just after the interval thanks to a rasping effort from Michael Bostwick after a well-worked corner. A second goal came deep into injury-time, Chris Beardsley countering and setting up Lee Boylan to slide the ball into the net. Three days later, Stevenage beat Barrow 4–0 to ensure a fourth consecutive win. In a tight first half, the home side took the lead through Yemi Odubade. Borough doubled their lead shortly before the interval; left-back Scott Laird firing the ball home. Odubade then scored his second after countering a Barrow corner, and subsequently completed his hat-trick late on with an effort drilled high into the net. Stevenage recorded their fifth straight win, beating Histon 1–0 at Broadhall Way. Jon Ashton scored the only goal of the game when he swept home Stacy Long's corner.

A week later, Stevenage travelled to Essex to play Grays Athletic. The game ended 2–1 to Stevenage, despite the home side leading at the interval through a Jamie Guy strike. Stevenage turned it around in the second half, with goals from Michael Bostwick and Charlie Griffin. Stevenage followed this up with another away win four days later at Crawley Town; winning the match 3–0. Stevenage started brightly and scored within the first five minutes; Yemi Odubade latching onto David Bridges through ball to slot home. The visitors doubled their lead on the half hour mark, this time Tim Sills was the provider, as Odubade scored his second. Joel Byrom scored Stevenage's third in the second half, picking up the ball a yard inside the Crawley half and chipped Simon Rayner in goal. Stevenage then followed this up with an eighth consecutive victory, beating Oxford United 1–0 at Broadhall Way. The only goal of the game came seven minutes into the second half, David Bridges was fouled in the area by Chris Hargreaves; Scott Laird stepped up and subsequently scored to ensure the home side earned three points. Four days later, Stevenage lost 1–0 to Luton Town thanks to a Matthew Barnes-Homer goal in the second half. Stevenage bounced back just two days later on Easter Monday, with a 3–0 victory over AFC Wimbledon at Kingsmeadow. The away side took the lead in the ninth minute; Mark Roberts bundling home a Joel Byrom corner after Tim Sills had knocked the ball down. Just two minutes later, Stevenage doubled their lead, again Byrom was the provider, and his lofted ball was met on the half-volley by Lawrie Wilson, who lashed the ball home – making his first start since breaking his leg in August. Stevenage rounded off the victory in injury-time, substitute Eddie Odhiambo slotting the ball home from Charlie Griffin's cross. Stevenage then faced Forest Green Rovers at Broadhall Way five days later; the game ended 2–0 to Stevenage. The home side took the lead in the tenth minute; Tim Sills broke the offside trap and set up Joel Byrom to lash the ball home. Stevenage doubled their lead in the second half when substitute David Bridges was brought down in the area. Scott Laird calmly stepped up and stroked the ball into the net. A third win followed four days later, when Stevenage beat Altrincham 1–0 in a tight encounter at Moss Lane. Substitute Charlie Griffin scored the only goal of the game in the 83rd minute; Altrincham goalkeeper Russell Saunders fumbled the ball into the path of Griffin who placed his shot in-between the goalkeeper and the post to ensure a valuable three points to the visitors.

Three days later, Stevenage secured promotion to the Football League for the first time in their history with victory against Kidderminster Harriers at Aggborough. Borough won the game 2–0, and took the lead within the space of 70 seconds when Charlie Griffin fired a free-kick past Kidderminster goalkeeper Jasbir Singh. Joel Byrom scored the second 15 minutes into the second half; winning the ball in midfield before cutting inside and curling his effort past the goalkeeper. A fifth straight win, and clean sheet, followed just three days later as Stevenage travelled up to Tyne and Wear and picked up all three points against Gateshead. The only goal of the game was scored from the penalty spot by Scott Laird after Gateshead's Phil Turnbull was deemed to have handballed in the area. The club bowed out of the Conference Premier with a 1–0 win against York City; the team's sixth win on the bounce without conceding a goal. The only goal of the game came ten minutes before the interval when Chris Beardsley's high cross evaded the York defence and David Bridges was on hand to head the ball into the net. The win means that Stevenage amassed a total of 99 points from 44 games; finishing 11 points clear at the top of the league table. Had Stevenage's two victories against Chester City not been expunged, the club would have ended the season with 105 points – a Conference Premier record for the number of points accumulated.

Game	Date	Opponent	Venue	Result	Attendance	Goalscorers	Notes
1	8 August 2009	Tamworth	Home	1–1	2,130	Boylan (pen)	
2	11 August 2009	Hayes & Yeading	Away	1–1	681	Drury	
3	15 August 2009	Barrow	Away	0–0	1,254		
4	18 August 2009	Ebbsfleet United	Home	3–0	1,704	Beardsley, Byrom, Wilson	
5	22 August 2009	Oxford United	Away	1–2	5,775	Odubade	
6	29 August 2009	Rushden & Diamonds	Home	2–1	1,704	Boylan (pen), Bostwick	
7	31 August 2009	Histon	Away	2–0	1,159	Laird, Odhiambo	
8	8 September 2009	Eastbourne Borough	Home	2–0	1,660	Ashton, Henry	
9	12 September 2009	Mansfield Town	Away	3–2	3,251	Beardsley, Odubade, Griffin	
10	19 September 2009	Chester City	Away	1–0*	1,089	Bostwick	
11	22 September 2009	Grays Athletic	Home	1–1	1,803	Boylan	
12	26 September 2009	Altrincham	Home	1–1	2,093	Bostwick	
13	29 September 2009	Luton Town	Away	1–0	8,223	Laird	
14	3 October 2009	York City	Away	1–1	2,644	Parslow (o.g)	
15	10 October 2009	Hayes & Yeading	Home	4–0	2,120	Griffin (3), Bostwick	
16	17 October 2009	Salisbury City	Home	3–1	2,009	Roberts, Griffin, Beardsley	
17	20 October 2009	Wrexham	Home	0–0	1,763		
18	31 October 2009	Kettering Town	Away	1–1	1,844	Byrom	
19	14 November 2009	Gateshead	Home	5–3	2,203	Griffin (3), Odubade, Bostwick	
20	21 November 2009	Forest Green Rovers	Away	1–0	757	Boylan	
21	24 November 2009	Chester City	Home	2–0*	1,487	Odubade, Roberts	
22	28 November 2009	Salisbury City	Away	1–0	851	Griffin	
23	1 December 2009	Ebbsfleet United	Away	1–2	836	Odubade	
24	5 December 2009	Kidderminster Harriers	Home	2–0	1,809	Ashton, Cole	
25	26 December 2009	Cambridge United	Away	3–1	4,439	Odubade (pen), Griffin, Beardsley	
26	28 December 2009	AFC Wimbledon	Home	0–0	3,033		
27	1 January 2010	Cambridge United	Home	4–1	3,406	Odubade, Boylan (2), Beardsley	
28	23 January 2010	Kettering Town	Home	2–0	2,136	Long (2)	
29	6 February 2010	Tamworth	Away	0–1	841		
30	9 February 2010	Mansfield Town	Home	3–1	1,753	Odubade (2), Drury	
31	13 February 2010	Rushden & Diamonds	Away	0–1	1,923		
32	24 February 2010	Wrexham	Away	1–0	2,319	Bridges	
33	2 March 2010	Eastbourne Borough	Away	6–0	903	Roberts, Bridges, Beardsley, Cole (3)	
34	6 March 2010	Crawley Town	Home	2–0	2,230	Bostwick, Boylan	
35	9 March 2010	Barrow	Home	4–0	1,538	Odubade (3), Laird	
36	16 March 2010	Histon	Home	1–0	2,407	Ashton	
37	23 March 2010	Grays Athletic	Away	2–1	515	Bostwick, Griffin	
38	27 March 2010	Crawley Town	Away	3–0	1,229	Odubade (2), Byrom	
39	30 March 2010	Oxford United	Home	1–0	5,744	Laird (pen)	
40	3 April 2010	Luton Town	Home	0–1	7,024		
41	5 April 2010	AFC Wimbledon	Away	3–0	3,840	Roberts, Wilson, Odhiambo	
42	10 April 2010	Forest Green Rovers	Home	2–0	2,524	Byrom, Laird (pen)	
43	14 April 2010	Altrincham	Away	1–0	907	Griffin	
44	17 April 2010	Kidderminster Harriers	Away	2–0	2,564	Griffin, Byrom	
45	20 April 2010	Gateshead	Away	1–0	702	Laird (pen)	
46	24 April 2010	York City	Home	1–0	5,068	Bridges	

- Note: Stevenage Borough goals come first.
- *Chester City were expelled from the league on 26 February 2010 and their results were expunged on 8 March. Therefore, Stevenage's 1–0 and 2–0 victories over them were removed from the records.

=== FA Cup ===
The draw for the 2009–10 FA Cup Fourth round qualifying was made on 12 October, with Stevenage Borough being drawn away to Conference South outfit Chelmsford City. The game ended 2–1 to Stevenage, despite the visitors trailing for the majority of the game thanks to Rob Edmans goal in the first-half. Charlie Griffin equalised on the hour mark, heading in Scott Laird's cross, before substitute Peter Vincenti scored a 93rd-minute winner after neat work from Yemi Odubade to ensure that Borough progress to the first round proper. The following day, the draw for the first round of the FA Cup was made, with Stevenage facing another away trip, this time at League Two outfit Port Vale. The game ended 1–1, with Charlie Griffin scoring an injury-time equaliser to take the game to a replay. Adam Yates had given the League Two side the lead just before half-time, before Griffin converted Mitchell Cole's cross one minute into the added-on time. The replay was played at Broadhall Way on 17 November, which Port Vale won 1–0 thanks to a Louis Dodds header in the first-half.

Round	Date	Opponent	Venue	Result	Attendance	Goalscorers	Notes
Q4	24 October 2009	Chelmsford City	Away	2–1	1,762	Griffin, Vincenti	
1	7 November 2009	Port Vale	Away	1–1	3,999	Griffin	
1R	17 November 2009	Port Vale	Home	0–1	2,894		

- Note: Stevenage Borough goals come first.

=== FA Trophy ===
The FA Trophy First round draw was made on 23 November; with Stevenage being handed a home tie against fellow Conference Premier outfit Ebbsfleet United. The game was played on 12 December 2009, with Stevenage winning the game 2–0 to progress into the second round. Borough took the lead after just thirteen minutes, a Stacy Long free-kick was played short to Mitchell Cole, who in-turn squared the ball across to Chris Beardsley to side foot home. The home side doubled their lead through David Bridges late on after good work from substitute Yemi Odubade.

The draw for the second round of the FA Trophy was made on 14 December 2009, with Stevenage being handed another home tie, this time against Conference North side Vauxhall Motors. Stevenage won the match 6–0. First half goals from Mark Roberts and Lee Boylan gave Borough a two-goal lead going into the interval. After the break, David Bridges scored twice in quick succession, before Andy Drury hit a swerving drive from 25 yards and Stacy Long scored his first goal in Borough colours with a neat chip. The victory means Stevenage face Conference South outfit Dover Athletic at Broadhall Way on 30 January. Stevenage won the match 4–1. The visitors took the lead midway through the first-half courtesy of Shaun Welford's close range effort. Shortly after, Borough equalised through Tim Sills, his first goal for the Hertfordshire side, who threw himself at Chris Beardsley's cross to restore parity. Just before half-time, Stevenage were ahead; Chris Beardsley slotting home after a mistake from Dover's Ollie Schulz. Michael Bostwick made it three just after, before substitute Yemi Odubade added a fourth; volleying home Stacy Long's cross.

On 1 February 2010, Stevenage were drawn at home to Conference North outfit Workington, with the game to be played on 20 February. Stevenage won the match 2–1; two goals from Stacy Long ensuring Borough come from a goal behind to progress into the two legged semi-final of the competition – where they faced Kidderminster Harriers.

On 13 March, the first leg at Aggborough ended 5–1 to Stevenage. Borough took the lead halfway into the first half when David Bridges latched onto a Michael Bostwick cross. Kidderminster equalised shortly after through defender Gavin Caines who drove the ball home from the edge of the area. However, it was not level for long, Mitchell Cole beat his full-back for pace and squared the ball to Yemi Odubade, who bundled the ball home. It was three before the interval; Bridges scoring again, heading in a perfectly weighted Joel Byrom cross. Chris Beardsley scored a second half brace to ensure a four-goal cushion for the Hertfordshire side going into the second leg at Broadhall Way. His first came when he met an Andy Drury delivery; his initial effort cannoned off the crossbar, but he was on hand to head in the rebound. His second came when he dispossessed Martin Riley on the touchline, cut in and curled the ball into the corner of the net. The second leg took place a week later at Broadhall Way, which ended 0–0 – ultimately meaning Stevenage progressed to the final at Wembley Stadium after winning 5–1 on aggregate over the two legs.

Stevenage faced Barrow in the final on 8 May 2010. Stevenage lost the match 2–1 after extra–time. Despite taking an early lead through Andy Drury's curling effort, Stevenage were faced with an uphill task after having David Bridges sent–off midway through the first half. Barrow pressed for an equaliser; and subsequently scored ten minutes from time – substitute Lee McEvilly heading the ball home unmarked in the area. Jason Walker scored the winner in extra–time with a curling strike.

Round	Date	Opponent	Venue	Result	Attendance	Goalscorers	Notes
1	12 December 2009	Ebbsfleet United	Home	2–0	890	Beardsley, Bridges	
2	19 January 2010	Vauxhall Motors	Home	6–0	678	Roberts, Boylan, Bridges (2), Drury, Long	
3	30 January 2010	Dover Athletic	Home	4–1	1,203	Sills, Beardsley, Bostwick, Odubade	
4	20 February 2010	Workington	Home	2–1	1,510	Long (2)	
SF1	13 March 2010	Kidderminster Harriers	Away	5–1	2,433	Bridges (2), Odubade, Beardsley (2)	
SF2	20 March 2010	Kidderminster Harriers	Home	0–0	1,622		
F	8 May 2010	Barrow	Neutral	1–2	21,223	Drury	

- Note: Stevenage Borough goals come first.

== League table ==
Pos	Team	Pld	W	D	L	GF	GA	GD	Pts	Promotion, qualification or relegation
1	Stevenage Borough (C, P)	44	30	9	5	79	24	+55	99	Promotion to Football League Two
2	Luton Town	44	26	10	8	84	40	+44	88	Qualification for the Conference Premier play-offs
3	Oxford United (O, P)	44	25	11	8	64	31	+33	86	Qualification for the Conference Premier play-offs
4	Rushden & Diamonds	44	22	13	9	77	39	+38	79	Qualification for the Conference Premier play-offs
5	York City	44	22	12	10	62	35	+27	78	Qualification for the Conference Premier play-offs

Source: Football Conference
Rules for classification: 1) points; 2) goal difference; 3) number of goals scored.
(C) Champions; (O) Play-off winners; (P) Promoted

== Season statistics ==
=== Starts and goals ===
No.	Pos	Nat	Player	Total		Conference Premier		FA Cup		FA Trophy	
No.	Pos	Nat	Player	Apps	Goals	Apps	Goals	Apps	Goals	Apps	Goals
1	GK	(England) ENG	Ashley Bayes	5	0	4	0	0	0	0+1	0
2	DF	(England) ENG	Lawrie Wilson	13	2	7+5	2	0	0	0+1	0
3	DF	(England) ENG	Scott Laird	53	6	44	6	3	0	6	0
4	DF	(Tanzania) TAN	Eddie Odhiambo	21	2	6+12	2	1+1	0	1	0
5	DF	(England) ENG	Jon Ashton	47	3	33+4	3	3	0	7	0
6	DF	(England) ENG	Mark Albrighton	19	0	8+7	0	0	0	0+4	0
7	MF	(Republic of Ireland) IRL	Darren Murphy	25	0	21	0	0+1	0	3	0
8	MF	(England) ENG	Stacy Long	26	5	14+7	2	0	0	5	3
9	FW	(England) ENG	Charlie Griffin	33	15	18+9	13	3	2	1+2	0
10	FW	(England) ENG	Lee Boylan	26	8	15+8	7	0	0	1+2	1
11	FW	(Nigeria) NGR	Yemi Odubade	47	16	25+12	14	3	0	5+2	2
13	MF	(England) ENG	Joel Byrom	48	5	30+11	5	1+2	0	3+1	0
14	DF	(England) ENG	Mark Roberts	49	5	40	4	3	0	6	1
16	GK	(England) ENG	Chris Day	52	0	42	0	3	0	7	0
17	FW	(England) ENG	Tim Sills	19	1	9+8	0	0	0	1+1	1
18	MF	(England) ENG	David Bridges	38	8	24+4	3	2+1	0	7	5
19	FW	(Tunisia) TUN	Dino Maamria	0	0	0	0	0	0	0	0
20	FW	(England) ENG	Chris Beardsley	47	10	33+7	6	0	0	7	4
21	MF	(England) ENG	Mitchell Cole	43	4	20+14	4	2+1	0	4+2	0
23	MF	(England) ENG	Andy Drury	38	4	22+9	2	3	0	2+2	2
24	MF	(England) ENG	Michael Bostwick	52	8	44	7	3	0	5	1
25	DF	(England) ENG	Ronnie Henry	48	1	39	1	3	0	6	0
30	MF	(England) ENG	Peter Vincenti	26	1	2+19	0	0+3	1	0+2	0
Players who left the club before the end of the season
17	MF	(Wales) WAL	Michael Brough	6	0	6	0	0	0	0	0

- Note: '+' denotes appearance as a substitute.
- Note: Herts Senior Cup games and statistics not included.

=== End of Season Awards ===
Award	Player
Supporters Association Player of the Year	Scott Laird
Players' Player of the Year	Michael Bostwick
The Comet Player of the Year	Chris Beardsley

== Transfers ==
=== In ===
Pos	Player	From	Fee	Date	Notes
FW	Charlie Griffin (ENG)	Salisbury City	Free transfer	9 May 2009	
FW	Yemi Odubade (NGA)	Oxford United	Free transfer	14 May 2009	
MF	Joel Byrom (ENG)	Northwich Victoria	£15,000	15 May 2009	
FW	Chris Beardsley (ENG)	Kettering Town	Free transfer	27 May 2009	
MF	Stacy Long (ENG)	Ebbsfleet United	Free transfer	5 June 2009	
FW	Tim Sills (ENG)	Torquay United	Undisclosed	15 January 2010	

=== Out ===
Pos	Player	To	Fee	Date	Notes
FW	Steve Morison (ENG)	Millwall	£130,000	15 May 2009	
MF	John Martin (ENG)	Chelmsford City	Released	20 May 2009	
FW	Calum Willock (SKN)	Crawley Town	Released	21 May 2009	
MF	Gary Mills (ENG)	Mansfield Town	Free transfer	26 May 2009	

=== Loans in ===
Pos	Player	From	Date	End date	Notes
DF	Danny Blanchett (ENG)	Peterborough United	7 August 2009	16 September 2009	
MF	Michael Brough (WAL)	Torquay United	25 September 2009	25 October 2009	

=== Loans out ===
Pos	Player	To	Date	End date	Notes
FW	Jerome Anderson (ENG)	Brackley Town	5 August 2009	24 April 2010	

== See also ==
- 2009–10 in English football
- List of Stevenage F.C. seasons
