= 2010 FA Trophy final =

2010 FA Trophy Final
- Event: 2009–10 FA Trophy
Barrow	Stevenage Borough
2	1
- After extra time
- Date: 8 May 2010
- Venue: Wembley Stadium, London
- Man of the Match: Paul Rutherford (Barrow)
- Referee: Lee Probert (Wiltshire)
- Attendance: 21,223

The 2010 FA Trophy Final was the 40th final of the Football Association's cup competition for levels 5–8 of the English football league system. The match was contested by Stevenage Borough who won the competition in 2007 and 2009, and Barrow who won the competition in 1990. Although Stevenage Borough, who had won the Football Conference were pre-match favourites ahead of Barrow who had finished 15th, Barrow won 2–1 in extra time, after the match had ended in a 1–1 draw.

== Club backgrounds ==
=== Stevenage Borough ===
Stevenage Borough were the first non-league team to appear three times at the new Wembley Stadium, London after winning two of the previous three FA Trophy competitions through victories in 2007 and 2009. Stevenage became the first team to win a competitive match, and subsequently, a competition trophy following the reconstruction of Wembley Stadium. The supporters of the club occupied the West End of Wembley Stadium and will do so again in the 2010 final.

=== Barrow ===
The last time Barrow appeared in the FA Trophy final was 1990, when they won 3–0 against Leek Town. They were making their first appearance at the redeveloped Wembley Stadium, in their second season in the Conference National following promotion from the Conference North.

== Route to the Final ==
Barrow		Round	Stevenage	
Kettering Town; A 1–0	Walker 49'	First Round	Ebbsfleet United; H 2–0	Beardsley 16', Bridges 88'
Maidenhead United; A 1–0	Bolland 8'	Second Round	Vauxhall Motors; H 6–0	Roberts 22', Boylan 40', Bridges 74' 76', Drury 78', Long 80'
Gateshead; H 1–1	Bond 63' (pen.)	Third Round	Dover Athletic; H 4–1	Sills 32', Beardsley 42', Bostwick 57', Odubade 85'
Gateshead; A 3–2	Walker 36' (pen.), Jones 44' (o.g.), Bond 73'	Replay	Dover Athletic; H 4–1	Sills 32', Beardsley 42', Bostwick 57', Odubade 85'
York City; H 2–1	Bolland 5', Walker 35' (pen.)	Fourth Round	Workington; H 2–1	Long 55', 90'
Salisbury City; A 1–0	Blundell 75'	Semi-Finals; First Leg	Kidderminster Harriers; A 5–1	Bridges 26', 43', Odubade 38', Beardsley 70', 83'
Salisbury City; H 2–1	Walker 51' (pen.), 89'	Semi-Finals; Second Leg	Kidderminister Harriers; H 0–0	

== Match ==
=== Summary ===
Barrow seemed to begin the game more brightly out of the two sides, with three shots in the first ten minutes. It was on the ten-minute mark where, in Borough's first attack of the game, Andy Drury lashed a strike straight into the top corner of Barrow keeper Stuart Tomlinson's goal. This goal seemed to change the feel of the game, with Stevenage applying more and more pressure until, on 28 minutes, Stevenage midfielder David Bridges was shown a straight red card for serious foul play on Barrow No. 7, Andy Bond. The game was evenly balanced from then until half-time.

Barrow began the second-half brightly, creating plenty of chances; Stevenage had a few chances, however Barrow seemed to apply more and more pressure. On 79 minutes, substitute Lee McEvilly placed a header into the bottom right corner of Chris Day's net. Barrow exerted more and more pressure from then onwards, until 90 minutes when Borough keeper Day suffered an injury and was replaced by Ashley Bayes. Deep into added time when extra time seemed likely, Robin Hulbert went in for a challenge with his elbow, meaning the referee had no choice but to show red. Stevenage substitute Charlie Griffin had a huge amount of blood coming from his face, there was no way he could continue. They had already used all three subs, meaning the extra time was played 10 against 9 (Barrow 10 players, Stevenage 9).

The first half of extra time was even, but Barrow were possibly edging it. The second half of extra time could not have started better for Barrow as Jason Walker struck a stunning 25-yard strike into the top left corner of the goal. Barrow seemed to try to play the clock down and Stevenage had a few decent chances, before on 117 minutes Barrow had a 3-against-1 on the keeper, which amazingly, they missed. In the end, it didn't matter and the trophy went to Barrow.

=== Details ===
8 May 2010
14:00 BST

Barrow	2–1 (a.e.t.)	Stevenage Borough
McEvilly 79'; Walker 107'	Report	Drury 10'

Wembley Stadium, London
Attendance: 21, 223
Referee: Lee Probert (Wiltshire)

Barrow	Stevenage

GK	21	(England) Stuart Tomlinson
RB	2	(Wales) Simon Spender
CB	4	(England) Paul Jones (c)
CB	5	(England) Phil Bolland
LB	3	(England) Paul Edwards
RM	8	(England) Paul Rutherford	(substituted off) 110'
CM	6	(England) Robin Hulbert	(red card) 90+6'
CM	7	(England) Andy Bond
LM	24	(England) Simon Wiles	(substituted off) 64'
FW	9	(England) Jason Walker
FW	26	(England) Gregg Blundell	(substituted off) 74'
Substitutes:
GK	1	(England) Tim Deasy
MF	8	(England) Mark Boyd	(substituted on) 110'
FW	10	(Northern Ireland) Lee McEvilly	(substituted on) 74'
MF	11	(England) Carlos Logan	(substituted on) 64'
DF	12	(Wales) Mike Pearson
Managers:
(England) Darren Sheridan (England) Dave Bayliss

GK	16	(England) Chris Day	(substituted off) 90'
RB	25	(England) Ronnie Henry
CB	5	(England) Jon Ashton
CB	14	(England) Mark Roberts (c)
LB	3	(England) Scott Laird
RM	23	(England) Andy Drury
CM	18	(England) David Bridges	(red card) 28'
CM	24	(England) Michael Bostwick
LM	30	(England) Joel Byrom	(substituted off) 59'
FW	20	(England) Chris Beardsley	(substituted off) 66'
FW	11	(Nigeria) Yemi Odubade
Substitutes:
GK	1	(England) Ashley Bayes	(substituted on) 90'
DF	2	(England) Lawrie Wilson	(substituted on) 59'
MF	8	(England) Stacy Long
FW	9	(England) Charlie Griffin	(substituted on) 66'
MF	30	(England) Peter Vincenti
Manager:
(England) Graham Westley
