= David Bridges =

English association football player

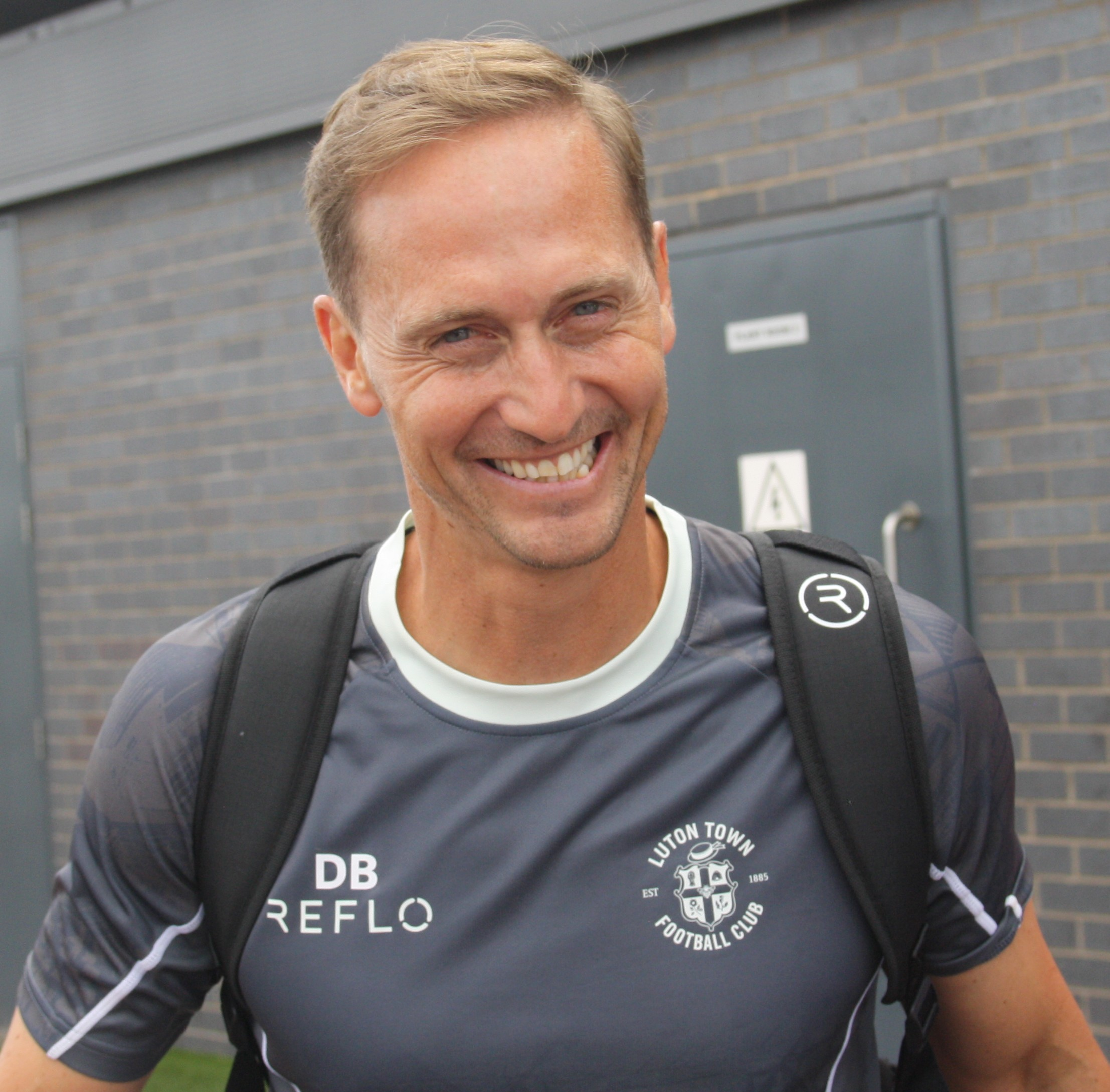
- Bridges in 2026

Personal information
- Full name: David Stephen Bridges
- Date of birth: 22 September 1982 (age 44)
- Place of birth: Huntingdon, England
- Height: 6 ft 0 in (1.83 m)
- Position: Midfielder

Team information
- Current team: Luton Town (first-team coach)

Youth career
- 1998–2002: Cambridge United

Senior career*
Years	Team	Apps	(Gls)
2002–2004	Cambridge United	45	(4)
2004	FK Rīga	0	(0)
2005	Braintree Town	4	(0)
2005	Histon	11	(1)
2005–2007	Cambridge United	66	(8)
2007–2008	Kettering Town	23	(11)
2008–2011	Stevenage	61	(6)
2011–2012	Kettering Town	35	(3)
2012–2013	Chelmsford City	28	(1)
2013	Bury Town	0	(0)
2013–2014	Brackley Town	15	(2)
2014–2016	King's Lynn Town	75	(8)
2017–2018	St Neots Town	22	(3)
2021	St Ives Town	1	(0)
Total		386	(47)

International career
2006	England C	1	(0)
- * Club domestic league appearances and goals

David Stephen Bridges (born 22 September 1982) is an English former professional footballer who played as a midfielder. He is a first-team coach at EFL League One club Luton Town.

Bridges began his career at Cambridge United, making his first-team debut in 2001. After three seasons, he had a brief spell with FK Rīga in Latvia and later played for Histon, before returning to Cambridge United in July 2005. He joined Kettering Town in July 2007, helping the club win promotion to the Conference Premier, and signed for Stevenage Borough a year later. During three seasons at Stevenage, he was part of the team that won the FA Trophy and achieved consecutive promotions from the Conference Premier to League One.

He later played in non-League football for Chelmsford City, Bury Town, Brackley Town, and King's Lynn Town, combining playing and coaching duties. Bridges initially retired in May 2016, but returned the following year in a player-coach role at St Neots Town. He subsequently joined Lincoln City as head of coaching in August 2018, worked with the Professional Footballers' Association, and returned to Lincoln as assistant head coach in August 2024. He also earned one cap for the England C team in 2006.

== Early life ==
Born in Huntingdon, Cambridgeshire, Bridges attended St Peter's School in his hometown.

== Club career ==
=== Cambridge United ===
Bridges played for local team Cambridge United, whom he joined at the age of eight, and he progressed through the club's youth system before signing his first professional contract in February 2002. He made his first-team debut as a substitute in a 1–0 defeat to Huddersfield Town at the Abbey Stadium on 16 March 2002. He played six further matches that season, scoring his first senior goal in a 2–1 home victory against Tranmere Rovers on 13 April 2002. Bridges was a regular in the first half of the 2002–03 season, making 25 appearances and scoring once in a 3–0 victory against York City. A persistent ankle injury curtailed his season, and he did not feature from February onwards. He returned to the first team in October 2003, and played a further 22 times for the club during the 2003–04 season. Bridges left Cambridge at the end of the season after failing to agree terms on a new contract, later stating the offer undervalued his contribution to the club. Over his three seasons with Cambridge United, Bridges made 55 appearances in all competitions, scoring four goals.

=== FK Rīga and non-League ===
Bridges trialled with several clubs ahead of the 2004–05 season, including Chesterfield and Northampton Town, but was unable to secure a contract. He also spent much of the close season in the United States training with two professional football clubs, though ultimately concluded that a move was not financially viable. Struggling to find a club in England, he accepted an offer to join FK Rīga in Latvia. However, just ten days after signing, Bridges suffered a fractured foot and did not make any appearances for the club. Despite the injury, he remained in Latvia for three months before returning to England to assess his options. In November 2004, he began rehabilitation at Lilleshall and started training part-time with Histon in January 2005.

Shortly after training with Histon, Bridges signed a short-term contract with Braintree Town, making his debut for the club in a 2–1 home victory against Slough Town a day after joining. He sustained a foot injury in a 3–1 away victory at Hendon, which proved to be his final appearance for the club; he played four times for Braintree, all of which were victories. A month later, Bridges joined Histon on a short-term basis, making 11 appearances, as the club achieved promotion to the Conference South during his time there. He left Histon at the end of the season and rejoined Cambridge United on a one-year contract following a successful trial. Reflecting on the return, Bridges stated he "did not hesitate in joining Cambridge for a second time" after being offered a full-time contract in June 2005.

=== Return to Cambridge ===
During the 2005–06 season, Bridges was a regular in the centre of Cambridge's midfield. He made his second debut for Cambridge in a 1–0 defeat at Forest Green Rovers, and scored in each of the following two games against Hereford United and Accrington Stanley. He made 40 appearances that season, contributing seven goals from midfield. His performances earned him the club's Player of the Year award and a one-year contract extension in May 2006. Bridges made 31 appearances under new manager Jimmy Quinn during the 2006–07 season, scoring three goals. He was released by Cambridge in May 2007 as part of a major overhaul of the playing squad. Across his second spell at the club, Bridges made 71 appearances in all competitions over two seasons, scoring ten goals.

=== Kettering Town ===
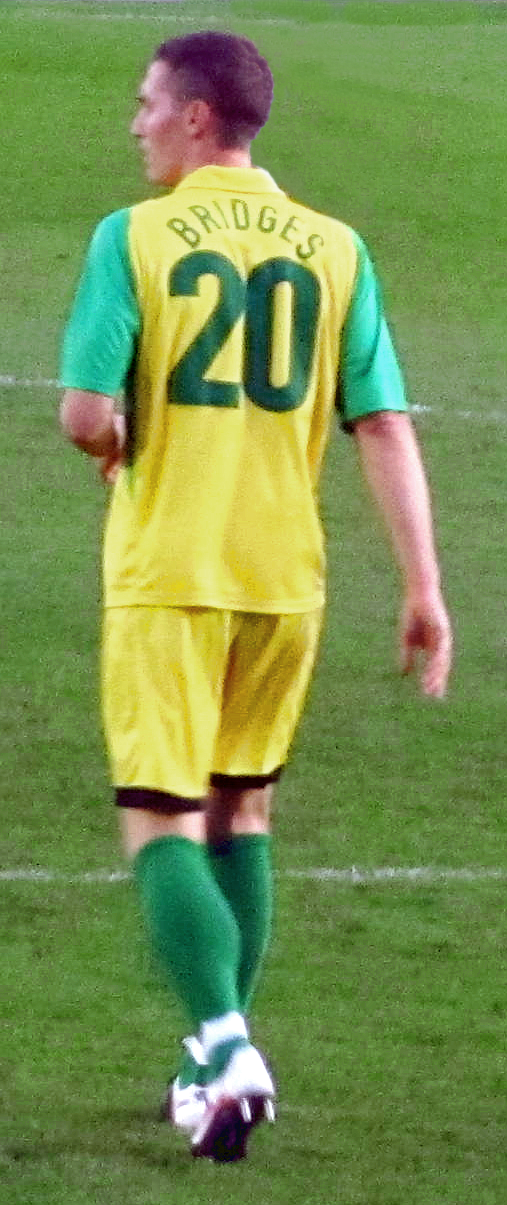
Bridges playing for Kettering Town in 2011

Two months after leaving Cambridge United, Bridges joined Conference North club Kettering Town on a one-year deal. He made his debut in late August 2007, starting in a 3–2 away win over Worcester City. He scored his first goal for the club in the following game, doubling Kettering's lead in a 2–1 victory against Tamworth. He was a regular throughout the 2007–08 season, scoring 11 goals in 27 appearances to help Kettering earn promotion to the Conference Premier.

=== Stevenage ===
Bridges was offered a new contract by Kettering manager Mark Cooper, which he rejected, instead joining former Kettering team-mates Craig Westcarr and Gary Mills at Stevenage Borough on 13 May 2008. A knee injury sustained in pre-season sidelined him for the first half of the 2008–09 season. He eventually made his Stevenage debut in a 1–1 draw against Oxford United on 20 December 2008, scoring Stevenage's goal with an "unstoppable drive from outside the area". Bridges went on to score three goals in the club's successful FA Trophy run that season, which included scoring the winner in Stevenage's 3–2 home victory against Ebbsfleet United in the first leg of the semi-final. His season was cut short by injury in a 1–1 draw against Oxford United at Broadhall Way, in which he scored Stevenage's goal before being ruled out for the remainder of the season. Bridges made 21 appearances during the 2008–09 season, scoring six goals.

Bridges returned from injury at the start of the 2009–10 season and made 37 appearances, scoring eight goals. His final goal of the season came in a 1–0 victory over York City in the club's final league match, as Stevenage earned promotion to the Football League as Conference Premier champions. He missed the first three games of the 2010–11 season due to suspension following a red card in the 2010 FA Trophy Final. An ankle injury sustained in training sidelined him for a month, returning to the first team as a second-half substitute in a 2–0 home defeat to Wycombe Wanderers in October 2010, later admitting he was "not fully fit". He scored his only goal of the season in Stevenage's 3–1 away victory against Port Vale on 22 February 2011. Bridges made 24 appearances in all competitions, helping Stevenage earn promotion to League One in their first Football League season.

=== Return to Kettering ===
Bridges rejoined Conference Premier club Kettering Town on 1 August 2011, signing a two-year contract after being released by Stevenage. An injury late in the previous season, combined with contractual delays at Stevenage, prompted him to sign for Kettering. Bridges made his debut in a 2–0 away victory at Lincoln City on 10 September 2011, the club's first away win of the season. After just five appearances, Bridges was transfer-listed by new manager Mark Stimson on 29 September amid the club's financial difficulties. Despite this, he remained involved with the first team and scored his first goal in a 2–2 draw against Ebbsfleet United. Following Stimson's departure, Bridges assumed responsibility for taking training sessions, with as few as six players attending due to unpaid wages. Bridges remained ever-present for the remainder of the season, making 38 appearances in all competitions. Kettering were relegated after finishing bottom of the league, and faced a further relegation after entering a company voluntary arrangement. Although he had one year remaining on his contract, Bridges left the club in July 2012, describing the season as the "worst of his career".

=== Chelmsford City ===
In August 2012, Bridges signed for Conference South club Chelmsford City on a free transfer. He made his debut in a 3–2 home win over Bromley on 25 August 2012 and scored his first goal in a 2–2 draw with East Thurrock United in the FA Cup on 20 October 2012. It took Bridges seven months to register his first league goal, scoring in a 6–0 home victory over Farnborough on 18 March 2013, a match in which he also provided two assists. He made 36 appearances in all competitions during his one season at Chelmsford, scoring twice, as the club were defeated 2–1 on aggregate by Salisbury City in the Conference South play-off semi-finals.

=== Later career ===
Shortly after the end of the 2012–13 season, Bridges signed for Isthmian League Premier Division club Bury Town on a free transfer. He left Bury Town in December 2013, without making an appearance, due to the club's financial difficulties, and subsequently joined National League North club Brackley Town the following month. Bridges made 15 appearances during the second half of the 2013–14 season, scoring twice.

Bridges left Brackley at the season's end and signed for King's Lynn Town of the Northern Premier League on 28 May 2014. On announcing the signing, manager Gary Setchell described the club as "very fortunate" to have secured Bridges at a time when he was balancing football with business commitments. Whilst sidelined through injury, and having already obtained his UEFA B Licence, Bridges was appointed first-team coach in February 2015. He combined coaching duties with regular first-team appearances, and following the club's transfer to the Southern League Premier Division for the 2015–16 season, he made 39 appearances in all competitions. Bridges retired from playing in May 2016 to focus on his business interests and spend more time with his family. Setchell described his departure as a loss for the club, but expressed full understanding of his decision to retire.

After more than a year in retirement, Bridges returned to playing with St Neots Town of the Southern League Premier Division, where he also served as a first-team coach. He made his first appearance in a 1–0 away defeat to AFC Rushden & Diamonds in the Southern Combination Challenge Cup on 3 October 2017. Bridges went on to make 25 appearances during the 2017–18 season, scoring five goals. His final match saw him score twice as St Neots won the Huntingdonshire Senior Cup. Bridges made one appearance for Southern League Premier Division Central club St Ives Town in August 2021.

== International career ==
In January 2006, Bridges was called up to the England C team, who represent England at non-League level, for a friendly against Italy C held at Cambridge United's Abbey Stadium, his home ground at the time. He came on as a 73rd-minute substitute as England C secured a 3–1 victory in front of a crowd of 3,025.

== Style of play ==
Primarily deployed as a central midfielder throughout his career, Bridges also played across all of the midfield positions. Manager Graham Westley described him as a player with "a lot of off-the-ball intelligence" who "reads the game well".

== Coaching career ==
Bridges began coaching whilst playing at Kettering Town, taking training sessions in January 2012 in the absence of a first-team manager. He earned his UEFA B Licence whilst at King's Lynn Town and was appointed the club's first-team coach in February 2015, a role he held for a year and a half while continuing to play.

In May 2017, he took on his first coaching-only role as first-team coach at Southern League Premier Division club St Neots Town. He left the club on 13 August 2018 to become head of coaching at League Two club Lincoln City. After spending over two years at Lincoln, he was appointed a coach educator for the Professional Footballers' Association in February 2021. He returned to Lincoln City as assistant head coach to Michael Skubala on 2 August 2024. After working in the role for three months, he left the club to "explore other opportunities within football".

Bridges was appointed first-team coach at EFL League One club Luton Town on 17 October 2025, working under first-time manager Jack Wilshere. He had previously mentored Wilshere during his time as a coach developer with the Professional Footballers’ Association, supporting him through his UEFA Pro Licence. Wilshere credited Bridges' experience, tactical knowledge, and character as valuable attributes in their coaching partnership.

== Personal life ==
Bridges supports Manchester United. In May 2018, he captained England in the inaugural Bubble Football World Cup.

== Career statistics ==
Appearances and goals by club, season and competition
Club	Season	League			FA Cup		League Cup		Other^{[A]}		Total	
Club	Season	Division	Apps	Goals	Apps	Goals	Apps	Goals	Apps	Goals	Apps	Goals
Cambridge United	2001–02	Division Three	7	1	0	0	0	0	0	0	7	1
Cambridge United	2002–03	Division Three	17	1	3	0	2	0	3 (Note: Appearance(s) in Football League Trophy)	0	25	1
Cambridge United	2003–04	Division Three	21	2	1	0	0	0	1	0	23	2
Cambridge United	Total		45	4	4	0	2	0	4	0	55	4
FK Rīga	2004	Higher League	0	0	—		—		0	0	0	0
Braintree Town	2004–05	Isthmian League Premier Division	4	0	0	0	—		0	0	4	0
Histon	2004–05	Southern League Premier Division	11	1	0	0	—		0	0	11	1
Cambridge United	2005–06	Conference Premier	35	5	2	0	—		3 (Note: Appearance(s) in FA Trophy)	2	40	7
Cambridge United	2006–07	Conference Premier	31	3	1	0	—		0	0	31	3
Cambridge United	Total		66	8	2	0	0	0	3	2	71	10
Kettering Town	2007–08	Conference North	23	11	2	0	—		2	0	27	11
Stevenage	2008–09	Conference Premier	15	3	0	0	—		6 (Note: One appearance in Conference League Cup; six appearances and three goals in FA Trophy)	3	21	6
Stevenage	2009–10	Conference Premier	27	2	3	0	—		7	5	37	8
Stevenage	2010–11	League Two	19	1	4	0	0	0	1	0	24	1
Stevenage	Total		61	6	7	0	0	0	14	8	82	14
Kettering Town	2011–12	Conference Premier	35	3	2	0	—		1	0	38	3
Chelmsford City	2012–13	Conference South	28	1	4	1	—		4 (Note: Two appearances in FA Trophy; one appearance in Essex Senior Cup; one appearance in 2013 Conference South play-offs)	0	36	2
Bury Town	2013–14	Southern League Premier Division	0	0	0	0	—		0	0	0	0
Brackley Town	2013–14	National League North	15	2	0	0	—		0	0	15	2
King's Lynn Town	2014–15	Northern Premier League Premier Division	41	4	1	0	—		6	1	48	5
King's Lynn Town	2015–16	Southern League Premier Division	34	4	2	0	—		3 (Note: One appearance in FA Trophy; two appearances in Southern League Cup)	0	39	4
King's Lynn Town	Total		75	8	3	0	0	0	9	1	87	9
St Neots Town	2017–18	Southern League Premier Division	22	3	0	0	—		3 (Note: One appearance in FA Trophy; one appearance in Southern League Cup; one appearance and two goals in Huntingdonshire Senior Cup)	2	25	5
St Ives Town	2021–22	Southern League Premier Division Central	1	0	—		—		0	0	1	0
Career totals			386	47	24	1	2	0	40	13	452	61

=== International ===
National team	Season	Apps	Goals
England C	2006–07	1	0
Total		1	0

== Honours ==
Histon

- Southern Premier League: 2004–05

Kettering Town

- Conference North: 2007–08

Stevenage

- FA Trophy: 2008–09; runner-up: 2009–10
- Conference Premier: 2009–10
- League Two play-offs: 2010–11

St Neots Town

- Huntingdonshire Senior Cup: 2017–18

Individual

- Cambridge United Player of the Year: 2005–06
