= Ray Byrom =

English footballer (1935–2020)

Personal information
- Full name: Raymond Byrom
- Date of birth: 2 January 1935
- Place of birth: Blackburn, England
- Date of death: 6 January 2020 (aged 85)
- Place of death: Blackburn, England
- Position: Outside left

Youth career
- 1953–1954: Blackburn Rovers

Senior career*
Years	Team	Apps	(Gls)
1956–1958	Accrington Stanley	9	(1)
1958–1960	Bradford (Park Avenue)	70	(14)
- Accrington Stanley
Total		79	(15)
- * Club domestic league appearances and goals

Raymond Byrom (2 January 1935 – 6 January 2020) was an English professional footballer who played as an outside left in the Football League.

== Career ==
Born in Blackburn, Lancashire, Byrom started his career in the reserve side at hometown club Blackburn Rovers before signing for Football League Third Division North side Accrington Stanley in January 1956. He spent two years at Accrington and was part of the side that gained promotion to the Third Division in 1957, however he only made eleven games in all competitions. In December 1958, he signed for Fourth Division side Bradford (Park Avenue), following manager Walter Galbraith to the West Yorkshire club. He played in seventy league games for Bradford before sustaining a broken leg in a fixture in August 1960, which eventually finished his career.

== Personal life ==
He settled in nearby Oswaldtwistle and following his retirement from professional football, Byrom started working for a motor supplies company in Blackburn before setting up his own business in 1972, Ray's Garage Supplies, with his wife Agnes. His son, Alan, also played for Accrington Stanley in non-league, as did his grandson, Joel, who featured for them in League Two. He died on 6 January 2020 following a short spell in hospital.

== Career statistics ==
Appearances and goals by club, season and competition
Club	Season	League			FA Cup		Total	
Club	Season	Division	Apps	Goals	Apps	Goals	Apps	Goals
Accrington Stanley	1957–58	Third Division North	4	1	2	1	6	2
Accrington Stanley	1958–59	Third Division	5	0	0	0	5	0
Accrington Stanley	Total		9	1	2	1	11	2
Bradford (Park Avenue)	1958–59	Fourth Division	22	6	0	0	22	6
Bradford (Park Avenue)	1959–60	Fourth Division	46	8	3	0	49	8
Bradford (Park Avenue)	1960–61	Fourth Division	2	0	0	0	2	0
Bradford (Park Avenue)	Total		70	14	3	0	73	14
Career total			79	15	5	1	84	16
