= Darren Murphy =

Irish association football player

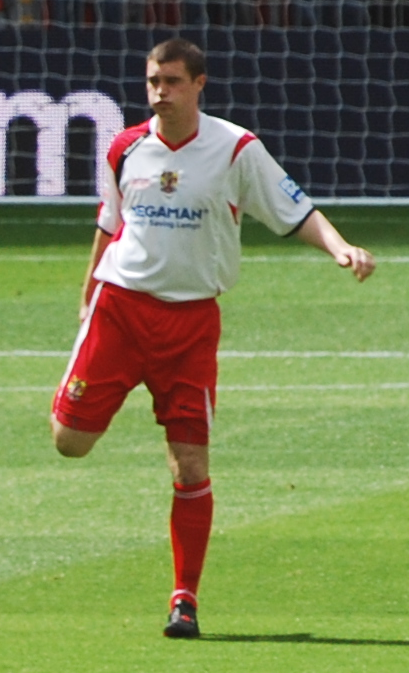
- Murphy playing for Stevenage Borough in the 2009 FA Trophy final

Personal information
- Full name: Darren Murphy
- Date of birth: 28 July 1985 (age 41)
- Place of birth: Cork, Ireland
- Height: 6 ft 0 in (1.83 m)
- Position: Midfielder

Youth career
- 2001–2003: Cobh Ramblers

Senior career*
Years	Team	Apps	(Gls)
2002–2007	Cobh Ramblers	75	(9)
2007–2008	Cork City	29	(2)
2008–2012	Stevenage	37	(1)
2012	→ Aldershot Town (loan)	3	(0)
2012–2013	Port Vale	3	(0)
2013	Macclesfield Town	0	(0)
2013	Woking	3	(0)
2014	Cork City	4	(0)
2015–2017	Cobh Ramblers	8	(0)
2017	Avondale United	0	(0)
Total		162	(12)

Managerial career
- 2021: Cobh Ramblers U19
- 2021: Cobh Ramblers (interim)
- 2021–2022: Cobh Ramblers
- 2025: Cork City U20
- * Club domestic league appearances and goals

Darren Murphy (born 28 July 1985) is an Irish football manager and former professional footballer who played as a midfielder.

Murphy began his playing career with Cobh Ramblers, progressing through the youth system and making his first-team debut in 2003. He signed for Cork City in February 2007, spending two seasons with the club before joining Conference Premier club Stevenage in December 2008. He helped Stevenage win the FA Trophy in his debut season and was part of the squad that achieved back-to-back promotions to League One, leaving the club upon the expiry of his contract in May 2012.

He joined Port Vale on a free transfer two months later and subsequently signed for Macclesfield Town in January 2013, but returned to Ireland shortly after due to a torn calf muscle. Injuries continued to affect the latter stages of his playing career, limiting his appearances with Woking, Cork City, and Cobh Ramblers, alongside a single appearance for Avondale United in April 2017. Murphy transitioned into coaching at Cobh Ramblers, serving as first-team coach, under-19 manager, interim manager, and finally first-team manager from September 2021 until June 2022. He managed Cork City's under-20 team during the 2025 season.

== Early life ==
Born in Cork, Ireland, he is a native of Carrignavar. Murphy combined playing football with serving his electrical apprenticeship in Cork from 2003 to 2006.

== Playing career ==
Murphy started his career at Cobh Ramblers, progressing through the club's youth system before making his senior debut in an FAI Cup match against Shamrock Rovers in August 2002, three weeks after turning 17. During his time with the club, he overcame a ruptured anterior cruciate ligament to make 77 appearances and score nine goals over five years with the club. In February 2007, he signed for Cork City on a two-year contract and featured regularly during the latter stages of the 2007 season, making 32 appearances. Financial issues forced Cork City into examinership in Murphy's second season with the club, and he departed when his contract expired at the end of the 2008 season.

=== Stevenage ===
Murphy joined Conference Premier club Stevenage on a short-term contract following a successful trial in December 2008. He made his debut in a 3–0 victory over Lewes at Broadhall Way and scored his first goal in a 2–1 win against Kettering Town. Murphy made 20 appearances during the 2008–09 season, receiving red cards against Kidderminster Harriers and Cambridge United, the latter was rescinded. This enabled him to feature in the club's 2–0 FA Trophy final victory against York City at Wembley Stadium on 9 May 2009, a competition in which he started six matches. The following season, he played 24 times as Stevenage secured promotion to the Football League for the first time in their history after winning the Conference Premier title.

Murphy began the 2010–11 season by scoring in a 2–1 League Cup defeat to Portsmouth on 9 August 2010, but was substituted at half-time after dislocating his shoulder, ruling him out for a month. In September 2010, he suffered a broken leg playing for Stevenage's reserve team against Colchester United, requiring surgery and initially expected to sideline him for the remainder of the season. He returned on 12 March 2011, playing the first half of a 1–0 away victory over Wycombe Wanderers. Murphy made nine appearances in all competitions that season, scoring once, including three in the League Two play-offs. Following a 3–0 aggregate semi-final win over Accrington Stanley, Stevenage earned promotion to League One with a 1–0 victory against Torquay United in the final at Old Trafford on 28 May 2011, with Murphy coming on as a 57th-minute substitute.

After missing the first half of the 2011–12 season due to a series of injuries, Murphy joined League Two club Aldershot Town on a one-month loan on 10 February 2012. He debuted four days later in a 1–0 home win against Hereford United, Aldershot's first home victory since December 2011, and made two further appearances before returning to Stevenage in March 2012. Persistent hamstring, groin, and ankle injuries prevented him from featuring in the remainder of Stevenage's season. He was released upon the expiry of his contract in May 2012. Murphy made 53 appearances in all competitions during his three years with the club.

=== Port Vale ===
Murphy signed a one-year contract with League Two club Port Vale on a free transfer on 2 July 2012. He made his debut from the substitutes' bench on 25 August 2012, replacing Chris Shuker in the 74th minute of a 3–1 victory over Morecambe at the Globe Arena. Murphy struggled with hamstring problems whilst the team moved up to second in the league table in his absence. He eventually made his first start on 20 October 2012, in a 4–1 home victory against Wycombe Wanderers. Upon his return to fitness, he remarked that "if there was a hell for footballers that's what you'd do, sit in the stand watching games injured." Murphy made only his third appearance of the season against Rochdale on 6 November 2012, but after entering the game as a substitute, he was forced off injured after only a few minutes due to a recurrence of his calf injury. He left the club by mutual consent on 8 January 2013.

=== Return to Non-League ===
Having initially planned to return to Ireland, Murphy received a contract offer from Conference Premier club Macclesfield Town. He accepted the offer on 31 January 2013, signing a deal lasting until the end of the 2012–13 season. Two weeks into his time at the club, he tore his calf muscle in training, and on 13 February 2013, having made no appearances for the club, his contract was cancelled by mutual consent.

He returned to Ireland and trained with former club Cork City. Murphy hoped to resume his playing career in England and spoke to Graham Westley, his former manager at Stevenage, who agreed to let him spend pre-season at the club ahead of the 2013–14 season. He arranged with Westley to "play some games for another club, to regain my confidence and then return to Stevenage". He subsequently signed for Woking of the Conference Premier on 24 September 2013. He made his Woking debut the same day his signing was announced, playing the first 68 minutes in a 4–0 home defeat to Luton Town at Kingfield Stadium. Murphy made three appearances for Woking before injury curtailed his time at the club.

=== Return to Ireland ===
Murphy returned to Cork City on a free transfer on 16 November 2013. He made his first appearance back at the club on 10 March 2014, starting in a 4–0 home victory over Limerick in the League of Ireland Cup. Murphy made five appearances during a season disrupted by injuries, as Cork finished the 2014 season in second place in the League of Ireland Premier Division. He suffered a dislocated shoulder in a pre-season friendly against Birmingham City in July 2014 and informed Cork City manager John Caulfield of his decision to retire from playing following the match.

Having recovered from the shoulder injury, Murphy was offered the chance to come out of retirement and rejoin Cobh Ramblers of the League of Ireland First Division in February 2015, which he accepted, making one appearance late in the 2015 season. Murphy remained at Cobh Ramblers for just over two years, making eight first-team appearances during his second spell with the club. He also played once for Avondale United of the Munster Senior League in April 2017, appearing in a 2–0 League of Ireland Cup defeat to his former employers, Cobh Ramblers, on 4 April 2017. Murphy retired from playing and made the transition into coaching.

== Coaching career ==
During his playing career, Murphy combined his playing role with a position as a community and academy coach at Stevenage in 2011. He also worked as a community coach at Port Vale. He earned his UEFA B Licence in 2017 and was issued his UEFA A Licence in 2019.

=== Cobh Ramblers ===
Murphy was appointed as first-team coach at Cobh Ramblers in January 2015, a position he held until October 2016. He returned as manager of the club's under-19 team in February 2021, before being appointed interim first-team manager on 23 July following the departure of Stuart Ashton. Murphy was appointed on a permanent basis on 16 September 2021, signing a contract until the end of the 2023 season, but left the club by mutual consent on 18 June 2022.

=== Cork City ===
Murphy was appointed manager of Cork City's under-20 team in January 2025. The team finished second in their division before he left because of work commitments in December 2025.

== Style of play ==
Murphy was deployed as a midfielder throughout his career. His midfield role was primarily that of a defensive midfielder, where he was tasked with breaking up opposition play. Murphy described himself as "never the best player", and what he lacked in the technical aspects of the game, he "compensated for" with his work ethic. Described as "an energetic, combative midfielder" and "tough-tackling", Murphy stated that his physical style of play contributed to the number of injuries he sustained during his playing career.

== Career statistics ==
Appearances and goals by club, season and competition
Club	Season	League			National cup (Note: Includes FA Cup, FAI Cup)		League cup (Note: Includes Football League Cup, League of Ireland Cup)		Other		Total	
Club	Season	Division	Apps	Goals	Apps	Goals	Apps	Goals	Apps	Goals	Apps	Goals
Cobh Ramblers	2003	LOI First Division	26	2	0	0	0	0	0	0	26	2
Cobh Ramblers	2004	LOI First Division	23	2	0	0	0	0	0	0	23	2
Cobh Ramblers	2005	LOI First Division	5	0	0	0	0	0	0	0	5	0
Cobh Ramblers	2006	LOI First Division	21	5	2	0	0	0	0	0	23	5
Cobh Ramblers	Total		75	9	2	0	0	0	0	0	77	9
Cork City	2007	LOI Premier Division	7	1	2	0	0	0	0	0	9	1
Cork City	2008	LOI Premier Division	22	1	1	1	0	0	0	0	23	2
Cork City	Total		29	2	3	1	0	0	0	0	32	3
Stevenage	2008–09	Conference Premier	12	1	0	0	—		8 (Note: Six appearances in FA Trophy; two appearances in 2009 Conference Premier play-offs)	0	20	1
Stevenage	2009–10	Conference Premier	20	0	1	0	—		3 (Note: Appearances in FA Trophy)	0	24	0
Stevenage	2010–11	League Two	5	0	0	0	1	1	3 (Note: Appearances in 2011 League Two play-offs)	0	9	1
Stevenage	2011–12	League One	0	0	0	0	0	0	0	0	0	0
Stevenage	Total		37	1	1	0	1	1	14	0	53	2
Aldershot Town (loan)	2011–12	League Two	3	0	—		—		—		3	0
Port Vale	2012–13	League Two	3	0	0	0	0	0	0	0	3	0
Macclesfield Town	2012–13	Conference Premier	0	0	—		—		0	0	0	0
Woking	2013–14	Conference Premier	3	0	0	0	—		0	0	3	0
Cork City	2014	LOI Premier Division	4	0	0	0	1	0	0	0	5	0
Cobh Ramblers	2015	LOI First Division	1	0	0	0	0	0	0	0	1	0
Cobh Ramblers	2016	LOI First Division	7	0	0	0	0	0	0	0	7	0
Cobh Ramblers	2017	LOI First Division	0	0	0	0	0	0	0	0	0	0
Cobh Ramblers	Total		8	0	0	0	0	0	0	0	8	0
Avondale United	2017	Munster Senior League	0	0	0	0	1	0	0	0	1	0
Career totals			162	12	6	1	3	1	14	0	185	14

== Honours ==
Stevenage

- Football League Two play-offs: 2011
- Conference Premier: 2009–10
- FA Trophy: 2008–09; runner-up: 2009–10
