= 2009 FA Trophy final =

2009 FA Trophy Final
- Event: 2008–09 FA Trophy
Stevenage Borough	York City
2	0
- Date: 9 May 2009
- Venue: Wembley Stadium, London
- Referee: Mike Jones
- Attendance: 27,102

The 2009 FA Trophy Final was the 39th final of The Football Association's cup competition for levels 5–8 of the English football league system. It was contested by Stevenage Borough, who won the competition in 2007, and York City on 9 May 2009 at Wembley Stadium in London.

Stevenage won the match 2–0 to win the competition for the second time in their history.

== Match ==
=== Details ===
9 May 2009
14:00 BST

Stevenage Borough	2–0	York City
Morison 69'; Boylan 90'	Report

Wembley Stadium, London
Attendance: 27,102
Referee: Mike Jones

Stevenage Borough	York City

GK	16	(England) Chris Day
RB	25	(England) Ronnie Henry
CB	14	(England) Mark Roberts
CB	24	(England) Michael Bostwick
LB	2	(England) Lawrie Wilson
RM	23	(England) Andy Drury
CM	8	(England) Gary Mills
CM	7	(Republic of Ireland) Darren Murphy
LM	30	(England) Peter Vincenti	(substituted off) 87'
FW	20	(Wales) Steve Morison (c)
FW	10	(England) Lee Boylan
Substitutes:
GK	1	(England) Ashley Bayes
DF	6	(England) Mark Albrighton
FW	9	(Tunisia) Dino Maamria
FW	19	(Saint Kitts and Nevis) Calum Willock
MF	4	(Tanzania) Eddie Anaclet	(substituted on) 87'
Manager:
(England) Graham Westley

GK	24	(Northern Ireland) Michael Ingham
RB	2	(England) Ben Purkiss
CB	6	(Wales) Daniel Parslow (c)
CB	5	(England) David McGurk
LB	25	(Wales) Shaun Pejic
CM	15	(Scotland) Simon Rusk	(substituted off) 81'
CM	17	(Wales) Levi Mackin
CM	8	(England) Mark Greaves	(substituted off) 75'
FW	18	(England) Adam Boyes
FW	9	(Australia) Daniel McBreen	(substituted off) 60'
FW	16	(England) Richard Brodie
Substitutes:
GK	13	(England) Josh Mimms
DF	3	(England) Mark Robinson
MF	11	(England) Simon Russell	(substituted on) 81'
DF	20	(England) Andy McWilliams	(substituted on) 75'
FW	7	(Nigeria) Onome Sodje	(substituted on) 60'
Manager:
(England) Martin Foyle
