= Eddie Odhiambo =

Tanzanian footballer (born 1985)

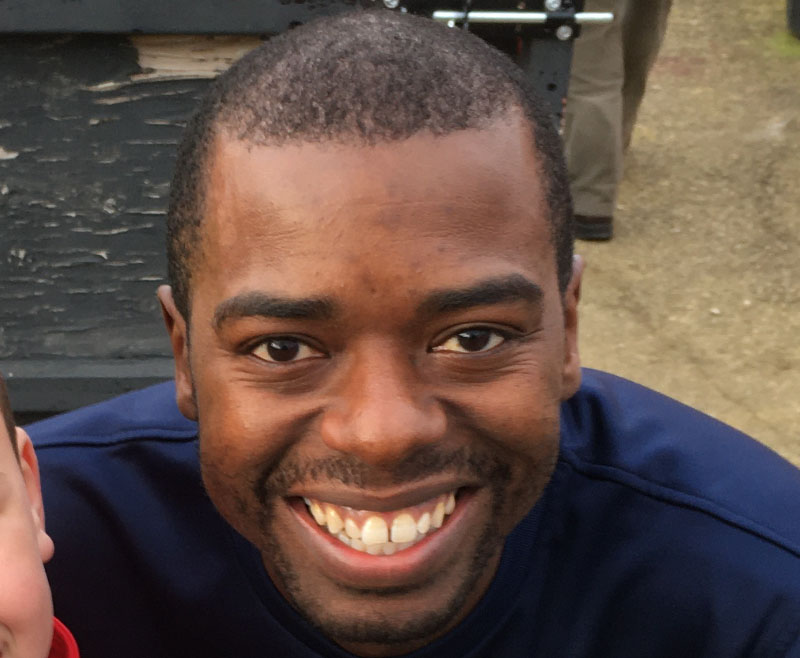
- Odhiambo in 2019

Personal information
- Full name: Edward Bahati Obara Odhiambo-Anaclet
- Date of birth: 31 August 1985 (age 41)
- Place of birth: Arusha, Tanzania
- Height: 5 ft 9 in (1.75 m)
- Position: Right-back

Youth career
- 2002–2003: Oxford United
- 2003–2004: Southampton

Senior career*
Years	Team	Apps	(Gls)
2004–2006	Southampton	0	(0)
2004–2005	→ Chester City (loan)	0	(0)
2005–2006	→ Tamworth (loan)	8	(0)
2006	→ Yeovil Town (loan)	0	(0)
2006–2008	Oxford United	76	(4)
2008–2010	Stevenage Borough	34	(3)
2010–2011	Newport County	32	(0)
2011–2012	Gateshead	25	(0)
2012–2016	Brackley Town	129	(4)
2016	Oxford City	7	(0)
2016	Kidlington		
2016–2017	Banbury United	29	(1)
2017–2018	Kidlington		
2018–2020	Banbury United	41	(0)
2020–2021	North Leigh	0	(0)
Total		381	(12)

Managerial career
- 2021–2022: North Leigh
- 2025: North Leigh
- * Club domestic league appearances and goals

Edward Bahati Obara Odhiambo-Anaclet (born 31 August 1985) is a Tanzanian football manager and former professional footballer who played as a right-back. He most recently served as manager of North Leigh.

Odhiambo began his career as a youth player with Oxford United before joining Southampton in 2003, signing professional terms the following year. He spent loan spells at Chester City and Tamworth during the 2004–05 season but did not make a first-team appearance for Southampton. In July 2006, he returned to Oxford United, where he established himself as a first-team regular. Odhiambo signed for Stevenage Borough in May 2008, winning the FA Trophy in 2009 and contributing to the club's promotion to the Football League the following season.

He subsequently spent one season apiece at Conference Premier clubs Newport County and Gateshead, before joining Brackley Town of the Conference North in May 2012. After four years and 142 appearances at Brackley, Odhiambo later had spells with Oxford City, Kidlington, Banbury United, and North Leigh. Transitioning into coaching, he held player-coach roles at both Kidlington and Banbury, before being appointed manager of North Leigh in March 2021, where he helped the club achieve promotion to the Southern League Premier Division South via the play-offs in May 2022.

== Early life ==
Born in Arusha, Tanzania, Odhiambo moved to Oxford at a young age, where he grew up and attended The Oxford School before completing his A-levels at Southampton College. He has three brothers, including Eric, who also played professionally, and Anaclet, who played at semi-professional level. In June 2009, he adopted his father's surname, Odhiambo, having previously been known as Eddie Anaclet.

== Playing career ==
=== Early career ===
Odhiambo began his career in Oxford United's youth system before joining Southampton's academy. He was part of the club's youth team alongside Theo Walcott and Dexter Blackstock, but did not progress to the first team. In December 2004, he joined League Two club Chester City on loan, making a single appearance in a 3–1 FA Cup victory away to Halifax Town. He returned to Southampton later that month and spent the remainder of the 2004–05 season with the reserve team.

In November 2005, Odhiambo joined Conference National club Tamworth on a three-month loan, making 11 appearances during his time there, comprising eight league fixtures and three FA Cup ties. He joined Yeovil Town on loan in March 2006, but did not play for the first team, featuring once for the reserves. He was released by Southampton at the end of the 2005–06 season.

=== Oxford United ===
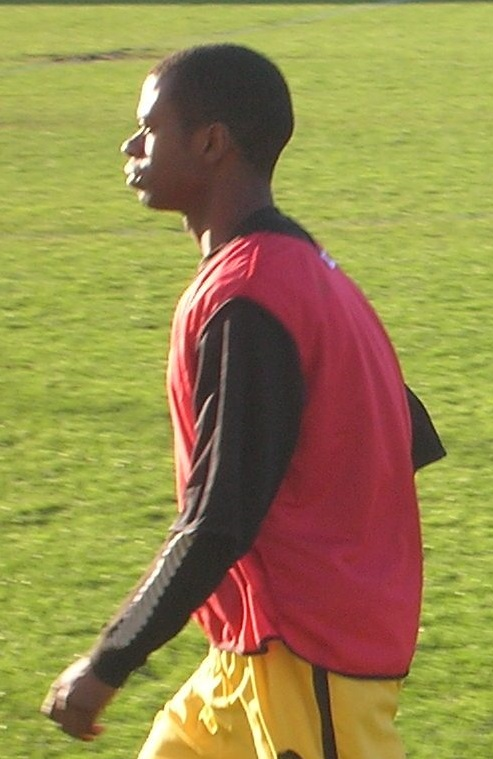
Odhiambo with Oxford United in 2007.

In July 2006, Odhiambo rejoined Oxford United following the club's relegation from League Two to the Conference National. Ahead of the season, he featured in a pre-season friendly against Manchester United at the Kassam Stadium, during which he was tasked with marking Cristiano Ronaldo. He made his competitive debut on the opening day of the 2006–07 season, starting in a 2–0 home victory over Halifax Town. He scored his first senior goal in a 1–1 home draw against Cambridge United on 3 February 2007. He ended the season with 47 appearances and three goals in all competitions, as Oxford missed out on an immediate return to the Football League following defeat to Exeter City in the play-off semi-finals.

Odhiambo's 2007–08 season was disrupted by injuries, including a knee ligament injury sustained in a 1–1 draw with York City on 30 September 2007, which sidelined him for six weeks. He returned to the first team on 10 November 2007, coming on as a substitute and scoring in a 3–1 FA Cup victory over Northwich Victoria. A broken collarbone sustained in a 1–0 defeat away to Northwich on 8 December 2007 kept him out for a further six weeks. He returned in January 2008 and was a regular for the remainder of the season, making 34 appearances and scoring twice. Across his two seasons with Oxford, he made 81 appearances and scored five goals.

=== Stevenage Borough ===
Wanting to remain at Oxford, Odhiambo was offered a contract extension at the end of the 2007–08 season, but on reduced terms. Stevenage Borough manager Graham Westley, who had previously praised him in The Non-League Paper, approached him regarding a move. Odhiambo signed a two-year contract with Stevenage on 14 May 2008, with Oxford entitled to compensation due to his age. He described the decision as difficult, but felt the move would be beneficial to his career. He made his debut on the opening day of the season in a 5–0 defeat away at Wrexham, and scored his first goal in a 2–1 defeat away to Eastbourne Borough on 12 October 2008. From November onwards, he featured only twice over a four-month period. His final appearance of the season came at Wembley Stadium, coming on as an 85th-minute substitute in Stevenage's 2–0 victory over York City in the FA Trophy final. He finished the 2008–09 season with 21 appearances and one goal. Although Westley informed him he was free to leave at the end of the season, Odhiambo opted to remain and compete for a place in the first team.

At the start of the 2009–10 season, Odhiambo found first-team opportunities limited. Not selected for the opening matches, he volunteered to lead training for non-playing squad members, which was positively received by Westley. He made his first appearance of the season on 31 August 2009, coming on as a substitute and scoring in a 2–0 victory against Histon. He later featured more regularly, providing assists in victories over Mansfield Town, Luton Town, and Eastbourne Borough, and scored his second goal of the season in a 3–0 win over AFC Wimbledon on 5 April 2010. Odhiambo made 21 appearances, scoring twice, as Stevenage won the Conference Premier and earned promotion to the Football League for the first time. Although the club had the option to extend his contract, the terms offered were contingent on appearances, which he declined. He was released at the end of the season, having made 41 appearances and scored three goals over two years with the club.

=== Newport County and Gateshead ===
Ahead of the 2010–11 season, Odhiambo joined Conference Premier club Newport County on a free transfer. He made his debut on 14 August 2010 in a 1–0 defeat away to Darlington. He featured regularly as both a right-back and central midfielder under Dean Holdsworth during the first half of the season. After Holdsworth departed in January 2011, Odhiambo struggled for game time under Tim Harris, making only five appearances, before returning to the first team under Anthony Hudson in the final month. His final appearance of the season came in a 7–1 victory over Gateshead on 30 April 2011, after which Gateshead expressed interest in signing him for the following season. He finished the season with 36 appearances as Newport placed ninth and was released at the end of the season.

Having also attracted transfer interest from Forest Green Rovers, Odhiambo signed a one-year contract with fellow Conference Premier club Gateshead on 7 June 2011. He joined alongside striker Yemi Odubade, with whom he had previously played at Oxford United, Stevenage, and Newport. Gateshead manager Ian Bogie highlighted Odhiambo's versatility, noting his ability to play at full-back, midfield, and on the right flank. He made his debut on 13 August 2011 in a 3–2 victory over Kidderminster Harriers at Aggborough. With his contract due to be automatically extended upon reaching 30 first-team appearances, Odhiambo was not selected for certain matches to avoid triggering the clause. He made 29 appearances in all competitions as Gateshead finished eighth in the league. He was released on 30 April 2012.

=== Brackley Town ===
Odhiambo signed for Conference North club Brackley Town ahead of the 2012–13 season, making his debut on 18 August 2012 in a 4–1 win over Altrincham. He scored his first goal for the club three days later in a 5–0 win against Hinckley United, his first in nearly two-and-a-half years. He made 47 appearances in all competitions as Brackley qualified for the play-offs after finishing third in the Conference North. Odhiambo played in all three play-off matches, with the club losing 1–0 to FC Halifax Town in the final on 12 May 2013. Across four seasons with Brackley, Odhiambo made 142 appearances and scored four goals in all competitions.

=== Further spells ===
Odhiambo joined National League South club Oxford City ahead of the 2016–17 season, making seven appearances before signing for Southern League Division One Central club Kidlington in September 2016. The following month, he moved to Banbury United, debuting in a 2–1 victory over Cambridge City on 10 October 2016, and went on to make 34 appearances that season. He rejoined Kidlington in a player-coach role for the 2017–18 season, playing alongside his brothers Anaclet and Eric. In July 2018, he returned to Banbury, making 54 appearances across the 2018–19 and 2019–20 seasons, the latter of which was curtailed in March 2020 due to the COVID-19 pandemic.

Odhiambo signed for Southern League Division One Central club North Leigh on 5 June 2020 as a player-coach. He made four appearances before the 2020–21 season was curtailed due to restrictions associated with the COVID-19 pandemic. He was appointed manager of the club in March 2021, at which point he retired from playing.

== Coaching career ==
Odhiambo earned his UEFA B Licence in 2020 and his UEFA A Licence in 2022. He gained initial coaching experience at Brackley before combining playing and coaching roles at first-team level at Kidlington, Banbury, and North Leigh.

He was appointed manager of North Leigh on 21 March 2021, and guided the club to promotion via the play-offs in the 2021–22 season, defeating Ware 4–2 in the final on 2 May 2022. In July 2022, he joined Oxford United as Academy Head of Player Care and also began working as a co-commentator for BBC Radio Oxford. Owing to these additional commitments, he left North Leigh by mutual consent on 14 November 2022. In March 2023, he was appointed Head of Football at Velocity Football, Oxford City's full-time educational academy. He returned briefly to North Leigh as first-team manager at the start of the 2025–26 season, before being appointed as Head of Football, Community & Culture at Oxford City in November 2025.

== Style of play ==
Odhiambo was regarded as a utility player in the early years of his career, featuring at full-back, in central midfield, on the wing, and as a second striker. At Oxford United and Stevenage, he was primarily deployed at right-back, the position he occupied for most of his career. His versatility, pace, and attacking runs were noted as strengths.

== Personal life ==
Odhiambo served as Head of Year at St Birinus School in Didcot for four years from 2018 to 2022. He is a student at Staffordshire University, studying for a degree in Professional Sports Writing and Broadcasting.

== Career statistics ==
Appearances and goals by club, season and competition
Club	Season	League			FA Cup		League Cup		Other		Total	
Club	Season	League	Apps	Goals	Apps	Goals	Apps	Goals	Apps	Goals	Apps	Goals
Southampton	2004–05	Premier League	0	0	0	0	0	0	0	0	0	0
Southampton	2005–06	Championship	0	0	0	0	0	0	0	0	0	0
Southampton	Total		0	0	0	0	0	0	0	0	0	0
Chester City (loan)	2004–05	League Two	0	0	1	0	0	0	0	0	1	0
Tamworth (loan)	2005–06	Conference National	8	0	3	0	—		0	0	11	0
Yeovil Town (loan)	2005–06	League One	0	0	—		—		0	0	0	0
Oxford United	2006–07	Conference National	44	3	1	0	—		2 (Note: Appearances in 2007 Conference National play-offs)	0	47	3
Oxford United	2007–08	Conference Premier	32	1	2	1	—		0	0	34	2
Oxford United	Total		76	4	3	1	0	0	2	0	81	5
Stevenage Borough	2008–09	Conference Premier	17	1	3	0	—		1 (Note: Appearance(s) in FA Trophy)	0	21	1
Stevenage Borough	2009–10	Conference Premier	17	2	2	0	—		1	0	20	2
Stevenage Borough	Total		34	3	5	0	0	0	2	0	41	3
Newport County	2010–11	Conference Premier	32	0	1	0	—		3	0	36	0
Gateshead	2011–12	Conference Premier	25	0	1	0	—		3	0	29	0
Brackley Town	2012–13	Conference North	40	1	2	0	—		5 (Note: Two appearances in FA Trophy; three appearances in 2013 Conference North play-offs)	0	47	1
Brackley Town	2013–14	Conference North	31	1	3	0	—		0	0	34	1
Brackley Town	2014–15	Conference North	41	2	0	0	—		0	0	41	2
Brackley Town	2015–16	National League North	17	0	3	0	—		0	0	20	0
Brackley Town	Total		129	4	8	0	0	0	5	0	142	4
Oxford City	2016–17	National League South	7	0	0	0	—		0	0	7	0
Banbury United	2016–17	Southern League Premier Division	29	1	—		—		5 (Note: One appearance in FA Trophy; two appearances in Oxfordshire Senior Cup; two appearances in Southern League Cup)	0	34	1
Banbury United	2018–19	Southern League Premier Division	23	0	0	0	—		3 (Note: Three appearances in Oxfordshire Senior Cup)	0	26	0
Banbury United	2019–20	Southern League Premier Division Central	18	0	0	0	—		10 (Note: Two appearances in FA Trophy; two appearances in Birmingham Senior Cup; three appearances in Oxfordshire Senior Cup; three appearances in Southern League Cup)	0	28	0
Banbury United	Total		70	1	0	0	0	0	18	0	88	1
North Leigh	2020–21	Southern League Division One Central	0	0	1	0	—		3	0	4	0
Career total			381	12	23	1	0	0	36	0	440	13

== Honours ==
=== As a player ===
Stevenage Borough

- FA Trophy: 2008–09; runner-up: 2009–10
- Conference Premier: 2009–10

Individual

- Brackley Town Player of the Year: 2012–13

=== As a manager ===
North Leigh

- Southern League Division One Central play-offs: 2022
