= Eric Odhiambo =

English footballer

Personal information
- Full name: Eric Geno Sije Odhiambo
- Date of birth: 12 May 1989 (age 37)
- Place of birth: Oxford, England
- Position: Forward

Youth career
- 1996–1999: Oxford United
- 1999–2006: Leicester City

Senior career*
Years	Team	Apps	(Gls)
2006–2009	Leicester City	0	(0)
2007	→ Southend United (loan)	5	(0)
2008	→ Dundee United (loan)	4	(0)
2008	→ Brentford (loan)	0	(0)
2009–2011	Inverness Caledonian Thistle	63	(10)
2011–2013	Denizlispor	32	(2)
2013–2014	Hereford United	7	(1)
2014	Sligo Rovers	19	(5)
2014–2015	Brackley Town		
2015	Kidlington		
2016	North Leigh	11	(0)
- * Club domestic league appearances and goals

Eric Geno Sije Odhiambo (born 12 May 1989) is an English former footballer who played for Kidlington in the Hellenic League as a striker. He began his career with Leicester City, but didn't make any first team league appearances, spending time on loan with Southend United, Dundee United and Brentford. Since leaving Leicester in 2009, Odhiambo has played for Inverness Caledonian Thistle in Scotland, Denizlispor in Turkey, Hereford United in England and Sligo Rovers in Ireland before joining Kidlington in 2015.

He is the brother of football players, Eddie and Anaclet Odhiambo. Odhiambo is now back at Leicester City as a part-time Academy coach.

== Club career ==
=== Leicester City ===
Odhiambo made his senior debut in a 3–2 League Cup defeat against Aston Villa on 24 October 2006. On 5 May 2007 he signed his first professional contract with Leicester along with seven other players, including Andy King, Max Gradel and Carl Pentney.

He joined League One side Southend United on a one-month loan on 31 August. Odhiambo made his debut, coming on as a substitute in the late minute, as Southend lose 3–2 against Brighton & Hove Albion the following day and on 29 September 2007, he made his first start and played 90 minutes, in a 2–1 win over Port Vale. His loan deal was extended by a month on 27 September, and several days later, having his loan deal extended, his loan spell was extended by a month once again but he returned to Leicester on 29 October without scoring any goals.

Odhiambo joined Scottish Premier League club Dundee United on loan in the January transfer window until the end of the season, under former Leicester manager Craig Levein. He made his debut as a last-minute substitute in United's 4–1 win against Hearts on 2 January.

On 27 November 2008 having failed to feature for Leicester up to this point, he joined Brentford on an initial one-month loan deal.

Having returned from an unsuccessful loan spell at Brentford, Odhiambo had his Leicester contract terminated by mutual consent on 30 January 2009, having never played a league game for the club.

=== Inverness Caledonian Thistle ===
On the same day, Odhiambo joined Scottish Premier League side Inverness Caledonian Thistle until the end of the season, making his debut as a second-half substitute against Celtic. The next game, Odhiambo scored his first goal, with the opener, in a 1–1 draw against his former club, Dundee United. Later in the season, the club would get relegated from the Scottish Premier League. Despite being used less often, Odhiambo was offered a new contract for another season and signed a new deal the following month, with a one-year deal.

With the club relegated, Odhiambo started his season, having missed out, due to injury but kept his first-team place and scored his first goal of the season, in a 2–0 win over Airdrie United on 14 November 2009, having played his first match last week. In the second half of the 2009–10 season, he was a key player in Terry Butcher's side which gained promotion to the SPL and scored five goals. At the end of the season, with the club promoted, Odhiambo was offered a new contract with the club for another season and signed another one-year deal.

With the club back at the Scottish Premier League, Odhiambo soon started his season when he scored his first of the season in the first round of Scottish League Cup in a 3–0 win over Queen's Park and scored three goals in two consecutive games against Hearts and a brace against St Mirren and on 30 October 2010, Odhiambo soon scored against Scottish giant Rangers. After the match, manager Butcher praised his performance. Due to his goalscoring form for months, Odhiambo was known as a 'super sub', insisting he wants to make a start in the first team, rather staying on the bench. Since then, Odhiambo was unable to score more goals and have been most used substitute later on the season. Despite earlier in the season that Odhiambo will stay, He was released by Inverness at the end of the 2010–2011 season

Since been released by Inverness, Sky Sports reports that Odhiambo is being tracked by number of clubs south of the border with an unnamed League One club

=== Denizlispor ===
In July, Odhiambo then signed for Turkish side Denizlispor on a three-year deal After the move, Odhiambo says his challenge to make an impact, like Kenny Miller. Having made five appearances by coming on as a substitute in the second half, Odhiambo scored his first goal, as Denizlispor lose 5–2 against Bucaspor on 15 October 2011. On 25 March 2012, Odhiambo received a red card – for the first time in his Turkish career – after a second bookable offence, in a 1–1 draw against Karşıyaka.

The next season, Odhiambo provided assist for Yasin Görkem Arslan – in a 1–0 win over Gaziantep Büyükşehir Belediyespor on 3 September 2012 and several weeks later on 23 September 2012, Odhiambo scored his second goal for the club – in a 4–3 loss against Tavşanlı. Several months later, Odhiambo soon find himself left out of the first team after a contract dispute with the club. Soon after, Odhiambo went on trial with League Two side Torquay United. However, the move had no avail.

=== Hereford ===
On 19 September 2013, Hereford signed Odhiambo subject to international clearance. During his time at Edgar Street, his opportunities were limited as he made only seven appearances, scoring one goal against Dartford. He left Edgar Street on 7 January 2014 following the expiration of his contract.

=== Sligo Rovers ===
After leaving Hereford, Odhiambo signed for League of Ireland side Sligo Rovers, based in County Sligo, Ireland. On 24 February 2014, Odhiambo scored a hat-trick on his debut against Crusaders in the 2014 Setanta Sports Cup.

=== Kidlington ===
After leaving Sligo Rovers, Odhiambo signed for Uhlsport Hellenic Premier Division side Kidlington, based in Oxfordshire, England. Odhiambo signed for Kidlington in August 2015 where he was a member of the side that won the Uhlsport Hellenic Premier Division title 2015–16 season, thus earning promotion to the Southern Football League Division One Central.
