= Joel Byrom =

English association football player

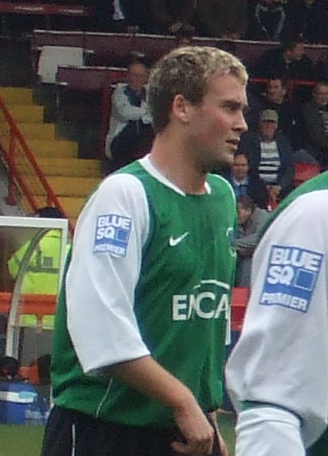
- Byrom playing for Northwich Victoria

Personal information
- Full name: Joel Alan Byrom
- Date of birth: 14 September 1986 (age 40)
- Place of birth: Oswaldtwistle, England
- Height: 6 ft 0 in (1.83 m)
- Position: Midfielder

Youth career
- 2001–2005: Blackburn Rovers

Senior career*
Years	Team	Apps	(Gls)
2005–2006	Blackburn Rovers	0	(0)
2006–2007	Accrington Stanley	1	(0)
2007	Clitheroe	21	(11)
2007	Southport	2	(2)
2007–2008	Clitheroe	18	(3)
2008–2009	Northwich Victoria	49	(9)
2009–2012	Stevenage	78	(9)
2012–2015	Preston North End	33	(4)
2014	→ Oldham Athletic (loan)	4	(0)
2014–2015	→ Northampton Town (loan)	19	(1)
2015–2016	Northampton Town	57	(4)
2016–2018	Mansfield Town	41	(1)
2018–2020	Stevenage	52	(2)
2020–2022	Farsley Celtc	4	(0)
2022–2023	Clitheroe	17	(1)
Total		396	(47)

International career
2009	England C	1	(0)
- * Club domestic league appearances and goals as of 09:50, 15 September 2025 (UTC)

Joel Alan Byrom (born 14 September 1986) is an English former professional footballer who played as a midfielder. Byrom is a scout for EFL Championship club Portsmouth.

Byrom joined the Blackburn Rovers academy at the age of 14, progressing through the youth system and reserve team without making a first-team appearance, before being released in the summer of 2006. He subsequently signed for League Two club Accrington Stanley ahead of the 2006–07 season, but was released in January 2007. Brief spells followed with Clitheroe and Southport, returning to Clitheroe in August 2007, where he captained the team at the age of 20. In January 2008, he signed for Northwich Victoria for a small four-figure fee. During his time at Northwich, Byrom represented the England C team in May 2009.

Byrom signed for Stevenage Borough for a fee of £15,000 in May 2009 and was part of the team that achieved back-to-back promotions from the Conference Premier to League One. He signed for Preston North End in August 2012, spending time on loan at Oldham Athletic and Northampton, with the latter move made permanent in January 2015. Byrom helped Northampton gain promotion to League One during the 2015–16 season. He later played for Mansfield Town, rejoined Stevenage in June 2018 for two seasons, and had subsequent spells in non-League with Farsley Celtic and Clitheroe, the latter marking the final role of his playing career.

== Early life ==
Byrom was born in Oswaldtwistle, Lancashire. His grandfather Ray Byrom was also a footballer.

== Club career ==
=== Early career ===
Byrom began his career at the Blackburn Rovers centre of excellence at the age of 14 after being scouted while playing for local junior team Oswaldtwistle United. He captained the club's under-17 team and progressed to the reserve team after playing regularly in the 2004 FA Youth Cup. Released in 2006 without making a first-team appearance, he signed a six-month contract with League Two club Accrington Stanley ahead of the 2006–07 season following a self-arranged trial. His grandfather, Ray Byrom, played for the club under its previous incarnation during the 1950s. Byrom debuted in a 1–1 draw against Carlisle United in the Football League Trophy in October 2006. Limited to two appearances, he was released on 12 January 2007, later stating the lack of playing time led him to consider leaving professional football.

Following his release from Accrington, Byrom joined Northern Premier League First Division club Clitheroe on a short-term contract in January 2007. He finished the 2006–07 season as the club's top goalscorer with 11 league goals, including a hat-trick against Kidsgrove Athletic on 12 March 2007. After his contract expired, he signed with Conference North club Southport on non-contract terms for the 2007–08 season, scoring twice in two appearances. Although offered a contract by Southport, Byrom returned to Clitheroe in August 2007 on a two-year deal. He credited the club with revitalising his career, while Clitheroe chairman Carl Garner stated: "It is one of the biggest signings the club has made. He's a special player and a special talent". In the first half of the 2007–08 season, Byrom scored six goals in all competitions, attracting transfer interest from Conference Premier team Northwich Victoria. He made his final appearance for Clitheroe in a 3–3 draw with local rivals Rossendale United, captaining the team for the first time.

=== Northwich Victoria ===
Byrom signed for Conference Premier club Northwich Victoria on a free transfer on 3 January 2008. He made his debut in a 2–1 defeat against Aldershot Town at Victoria Stadium, scoring Northwich's goal. He scored in a 2–1 away victory at Stevenage Borough on 22 April 2008, a result that secured the club's Conference Premier status for the following season. He finished the 2007–08 season with 21 appearances and five goals from midfield.

Following a 4–1 defeat to Eastbourne Borough in December 2008, Byrom underwent a hernia operation that kept him out of the first team for ten weeks. He returned in February 2009 and played regularly for the remainder of the season, recording his second career hat-trick in a 4–2 victory against Rushden & Diamonds on 28 March 2009. Despite winning their final six matches, Northwich were relegated from the Conference Premier in April 2009. During his time at Northwich, he made 52 appearances and scored nine goals.

=== Stevenage ===
Byrom signed for Conference Premier club Stevenage Borough for a fee of £15,000 on 16 May 2009. He made his debut in a 1–1 draw at home to Tamworth in the opening game of the 2009–10 season, a match in which he was sent off in the 90th minute for a second bookable offence. He scored his first goal for the club on his return to the first team in a 3–0 victory against Ebbsfleet United on 18 August 2009, and also scored from just inside Crawley Town's half in a 3–0 win on 27 March 2010. Byrom scored the second goal in a 2–0 victory against Kidderminster Harriers on 17 April 2010, a match that secured Stevenage's promotion to the Football League for the first time in the club's history. He finished the season with 46 appearances and five goals in all competitions.

Byrom started in Stevenage's first Football League match, a 2–2 home draw against Macclesfield Town on 7 August 2010. After playing the entirety of a 1–0 defeat to Cheltenham Town on 11 September 2010, he suffered a series of injuries that kept him out of the first team for five months. He returned on 8 February 2011, coming on as an 89th-minute substitute in a 3–0 defeat at Bury. Byrom scored his first goal of the season in Stevenage's 2–0 home victory against former club Accrington in the League Two play-off semi-final first leg, reaching the ball ahead of goalkeeper Alex Cisak to double the lead. He started in the final, a 1–0 victory against Torquay United at Old Trafford, securing back-to-back promotions to League One. Byrom made 12 appearances during the season, scoring once.

Byrom scored his first goal of the 2011–12 season in Stevenage's 6–1 away victory against Colchester United on 26 December 2011. He scored in the club's fifth round FA Cup tie away at Premier League club Tottenham Hotspur on 8 March 2012, converting a penalty to give Stevenage the lead in an eventual 3–1 defeat. He added two further goals late in the season: in a 2–2 draw at Sheffield United and in a 3–0 victory over Bury on the final day of the regular season, helping Stevenage secure sixth place and a place in the play-offs. He played in both semi-final legs, which Stevenage lost 1–0 on aggregate to Sheffield United. He made 40 appearances during the season, scoring five goals. Despite playing regularly under new manager Gary Smith, Byrom declined the offer of a contract extension and left the club on 25 May 2012. During his three-year spell at Stevenage, he made 98 appearances in all competitions, scoring 11 goals.

=== Preston North End ===
After leaving Stevenage, Byrom joined League One club Preston North End on a free transfer on 12 August 2012, reuniting with manager Graham Westley, who had previously signed him for Stevenage. He made his competitive debut in a 2–1 away victory over Bury on 8 September 2012, coming on as a second-half substitute. Byrom scored his first goal in his third appearance for the club, opening the scoring in a 5–0 win against Hartlepool United at Deepdale on 18 September 2012. He finished the season with 27 appearances, 11 of which as a substitute, and scored three goals.

Byrom remained at Preston for the start of the 2013–14 season, making his first appearance as an 82nd-minute substitute and scoring five minutes later in a 4–4 draw away at Coventry City on 25 August 2013. He signed a one-year contract extension on 7 December 2013, keeping him contracted to the club until summer 2015. Despite the extension, Byrom did not play again for Preston and joined fellow League One club Oldham Athletic on an emergency loan on 14 March 2014 until the end of the season. He made his debut the following day, playing the full match in a 1–1 draw at Crewe Alexandra. His loan spell was disrupted by injury, limiting him to four appearances during the two-month spell before returning to Preston in May 2014.

=== Northampton Town ===
Having made no appearances for Preston at the beginning of the 2014–15 season, Byrom joined League Two club Northampton Town on a four-month loan on 21 August 2014. Byrom was a mainstay in Northampton's midfield during the loan spell, making 23 appearances, and the move was made permanent on 8 January 2015 following the termination of his Preston contract by mutual consent. He continued to play regularly for the remainder of the season and signed a new two-year contract with the club on 23 April 2015. He finished the season with 43 appearances in all competitions, scoring three goals, as the club placed 12th in League Two.

Byrom remained a regular starter for the club throughout the 2015–16 season, making 40 appearances and scoring twice, as Northampton gained promotion to League One after finishing as League Two champions. This marked the second occasion he achieved promotion from the fourth tier of English football, having previously done so with Stevenage five seasons earlier. Despite being a first-team regular over the preceding two seasons, Byrom made only four appearances in the opening four months of the 2016–17 season, two of which were in the EFL Trophy. In December 2016, after nearly two months without playing, Northampton confirmed the termination of his contract. During his two-and-a-half-year spell at Northampton, he made 83 appearances and scored five goals.

=== Mansfield Town ===
Following his departure from Northampton, Byrom joined League Two club Mansfield Town on 31 December 2016. He made his debut three days later in a 1–0 away victory over Blackpool and went on to make 22 appearances in central midfield during the remainder of the season. His first goal for the club came on 6 March 2018, four minutes after coming on as a half-time substitute, in a 1–1 draw with Lincoln City. Unable to establish a regular first-team place during the 2017–18 season, in which he made 23 appearances, Byrom was released at the end of his contract in May 2018.

=== Return to Stevenage ===
After leaving Mansfield, Byrom returned to League Two club Stevenage on 21 June 2018, reuniting with manager Dino Maamria for a fourth time; Maamria previously signed him for Northwich and coached him at Stevenage and Preston. Byrom marked his second Stevenage debut by scoring in a 2–2 home draw with Tranmere Rovers on the opening day of the 2018–19 season. He was ever-present in the centre of midfield throughout the season, playing in all of the club's League Two, FA Cup and EFL Cup fixtures, and finished the season with 48 appearances and two goals, as Stevenage placed 10th in League Two, one point behind the play-off positions. Byrom signed a one-year contract extension on 25 June 2019, but injuries restricted him to seven appearances during the 2019–20 season, which was curtailed due to the COVID-19 pandemic in March 2020. He was released by the club in June 2020.

=== Farsley Celtic ===
After deciding to relocate and return to the north of England, Byrom signed a one-year contract with National League North club Farsley Celtic on 2 September 2020. He debuted for Farsley in the club's 2–1 defeat to Spennymoor Town on 6 October 2020 but was limited to two league appearances due to a groin injury. He recovered from the injury, but the 2020–21 National League North season was curtailed in February 2021 owing to COVID-19 restrictions. Byrom signed a new one-year contract with Farsley on 4 May 2021.

=== Return to Clitheroe ===
Byrom returned to Northern Premier League Division One West club Clitheroe on 11 January 2022, having previously had two spells with the club earlier in his career. He made 16 appearances before announcing his retirement from playing on 12 September 2022. Byrom briefly came out of retirement for Clitheroe's final regular season match of the 2022–23 season, scoring in a 3–1 defeat to Kidsgrove Athletic. Following his retirement, Byrom began working as a scout for EFL Championship club Portsmouth, managed by former teammate John Mousinho.

== International career ==
Byrom was called up to the England C team, who represent England at non-League level, in May 2009 for the International Challenge Trophy final against Belgium under-21s. He started the match, which England lost 1–0 at the Kassam Stadium.

== Style of play ==
Byrom played as a central midfielder. Left-footed, the left side was not his natural position, and he was rarely used as a winger. He was described as a skilful and technically gifted player, noted for his ability to pass effectively, create chances, and contribute goals. Managers and coaches praised his creativity, vision, and capacity to unlock defences, while also highlighting his ability to score from long range.

== Career statistics ==
Appearances and goals by club, season and competition
Club	Season	League			FA Cup		League Cup		Other		Total	
Club	Season	Division	Apps	Goals	Apps	Goals	Apps	Goals	Apps	Goals	Apps	Goals
Blackburn Rovers	2005–06	Premier League	0	0	0	0	0	0	0	0	0	0
Accrington Stanley	2006–07	League Two	1	0	0	0	0	0	1 (Note: Appearance(s) in Football League Trophy)	0	2	0
Clitheroe	2006–07	NPL Division One	21	11	0	0	—		0	0	21	11
Southport	2007–08	Conference North	2	2	0	0	—		0	0	2	2
Clitheroe	2007–08	NPL Division One	18	3	2	1	—		2 (Note: Appearance(s) in FA Trophy)	2	22	6
Northwich Victoria	2007–08	Conference Premier	21	5	0	0	—		0	0	21	5
Northwich Victoria	2008–09	Conference Premier	28	4	1	0	—		2	0	31	4
Northwich Victoria	Total		49	9	1	0	0	0	2	0	52	9
Stevenage	2009–10	Conference Premier	39	5	3	0	—		4	0	46	5
Stevenage	2010–11	League Two	7	0	0	0	1	0	4 (Note: One appearance in Football League Trophy; two appearances in 2011 League Two play-offs)	1	12	1
Stevenage	2011–12	League One	32	4	6	1	0	0	2 (Note: Appearances in 2012 League One play-offs)	0	40	5
Stevenage	Total		78	9	9	1	1	0	10	1	98	11
Preston North End	2012–13	League One	22	2	2	1	1	0	2	0	27	3
Preston North End	2013–14	League One	11	2	2	0	0	0	0	0	13	2
Preston North End	Total		33	4	4	1	1	0	2	0	40	5
Oldham Athletic (loan)	2013–14	League One	4	0	—		—		0	0	4	0
Northampton Town	2014–15	League Two	39	3	2	0	1	0	1	0	43	3
Northampton Town	2015–16	League Two	35	2	3	0	2	0	0	0	40	2
Northampton Town	2016–17	League One	2	0	0	0	0	0	2	0	4	0
Northampton Town	Total		76	5	5	0	3	0	3	0	87	5
Mansfield Town	2016–17	League Two	22	0	0	0	0	0	0	0	22	0
Mansfield Town	2017–18	League Two	19	1	2	0	1	0	1	0	23	1
Mansfield Town	Total		41	1	2	0	1	0	1	0	45	1
Stevenage	2018–19	League Two	46	2	1	0	1	0	0	0	48	2
Stevenage	2019–20	League Two	6	0	0	0	0	0	1	0	7	0
Stevenage	Total		52	2	1	0	1	0	1	0	55	2
Farsley Celtic	2020–21	National League North	2	0	0	0	—		0	0	2	0
Farsley Celtic	2021–22	National League North	2	0	0	0	—		0	0	2	0
Farsley Celtic	Total		4	0	0	0	0	0	0	0	4	0
Clitheroe	2021–22	NPL Division One West	14	0	—		—		—		14	0
Clitheroe	2022–23	NPL Division One West	3	1	0	0	—		—		3	1
Clitheroe	Total		17	1	0	0	0	0	0	0	17	1
Career totals			396	47	24	3	7	0	22	3	449	53

== Honours ==
Stevenage

- Football League Two play-offs: 2011
- Conference Premier: 2009–10
- FA Trophy runner-up: 2009–10

Northampton Town

- Football League Two: 2015–16
