= Andy Drury =

English footballer (born 1983)

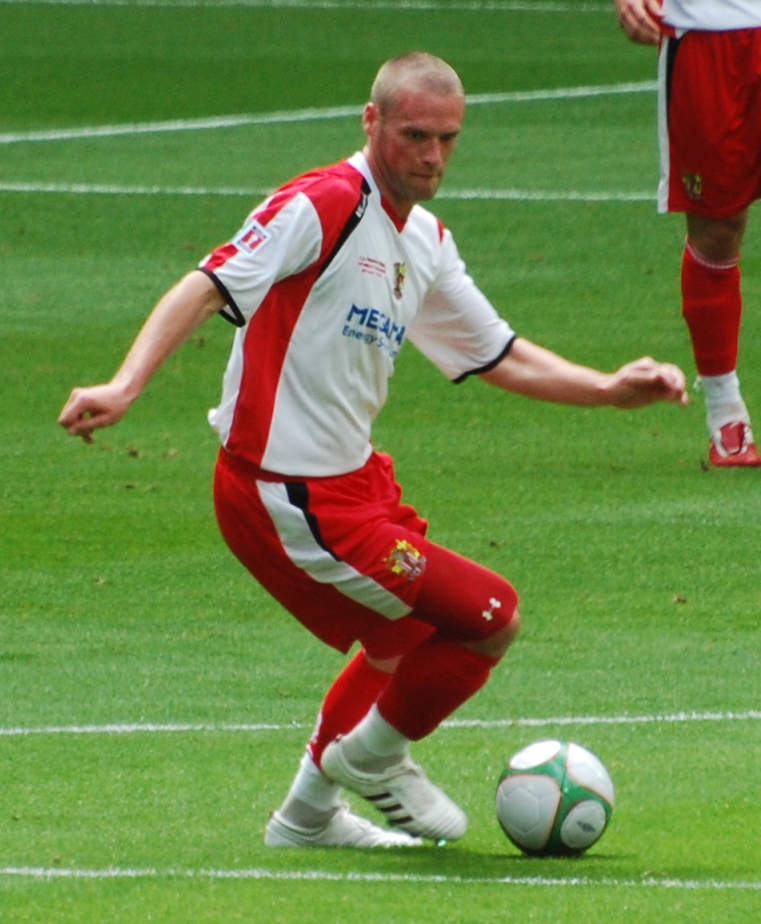
- Drury playing for Stevenage Borough in the 2009 FA Trophy Final

Personal information
- Full name: Andrew Mark Drury
- Date of birth: 28 November 1983 (age 42)
- Place of birth: Sittingbourne, England
- Height: 5 ft 11 in (1.80 m)
- Positions: Winger; attacking midfielder

Senior career*
| Years | Team | Apps | (Gls) |
| 2001–2003 | Sittingbourne | 98 | (26) |
| 2003–2006 | Gravesend & Northfleet | 101 | (19) |
| 2006–2008 | Lewes | 72 | (16) |
| 2008–2010 | Stevenage Borough | 57 | (7) |
| 2010–2011 | Luton Town | 23 | (6) |
| 2011–2013 | Ipswich Town | 62 | (2) |
| 2011 | → Crawley Town (loan) | 13 | (3) |
| 2013–2014 | Crawley Town | 41 | (5) |
| 2014–2015 | Luton Town | 35 | (2) |
| 2015–2016 | Eastleigh | 53 | (12) |
| 2016–2019 | Ebbsfleet United | 99 | (13) |
| 2019–2020 | Havant & Waterlooville | 27 | (3) |
| 2020–2021 | Sittingbourne | 0 | (0) |
| 2021 | Cray Wanderers | 8 | (1) |
| 2022 | Folkestone Invicta | 12 | (0) |
| 2023 | Chatham Town | 12 | (1) |
| 2023–2024 | Folkestone Invicta | 13 | (0) |
| Total | | 726 | (116) |

Managerial career
- 2022: Whitstable Town
- 2022: Margate
- 2023–2025: Folkestone Invicta
- 2026: Hythe Town
- * Club domestic league appearances and goals as of 22:48, 11 March 2025 (UTC)

Andrew Mark Drury (born 28 November 1983) is an English footballer and football manager.

He started his career in non-League football for Sittingbourne in 2001, moving to Gravesend & Northfleet in 2003. He remained with the club for three seasons before signing for Conference South side Lewes in 2006. In 2008, Drury moved up a division to the Conference Premier, signing for Stevenage Borough. In 2009, Drury won the FA Trophy with the club and, the next season, won promotion to The Football League. He opted against signing a new contract, instead joining Conference Premier side Luton Town. He remained at Luton for half a season before his strong performances attracted the interest of Championship club Ipswich Town. In January 2011 he moved to Portman Road in a transfer worth £150,000. He played in 64 games for Ipswich, alongside a loan spell at Crawley Town in League Two, before leaving in 2013 to sign for Crawley on a two-year contract. In June 2014, Drury signed for his former club Luton Town, now newly promoted to League Two, for a £100,000 fee. His second spell at the club ended by mutual consent a year early. Drury then went to play for Eastleigh, Ebbsfleet United, Havant & Waterlooville, Cray Wanderers and Folkestone Invicta before becoming the manager of Isthmian League club Whitstable Town.

== Playing career ==
=== Early career ===
He started his club career at Sittingbourne, making 107 appearances before moving onto Gravesend and Northfleet (now Ebbsfleet United). He then went on to play for Lewes before a move up a division to Stevenage. At Stevenage, he won both the 2008-09 FA Trophy and the Conference Premier title, before making a short move to Luton Town. His performance in Luton's 2–2 FA Cup draw with Charlton Athletic, in which he scored two goals, brought him to the attention of clubs higher up the football pyramid, including Ipswich Town.

=== Ipswich Town ===
On 31 January 2011, Drury signed for Ipswich Town in a £150,000 move, signing a 2 1/2-year deal. He made his league debut coming on as a 63rd-minute substitute, replacing Lee Martin in a 6–0 away win against Doncaster Rovers. He made his home debut the following weekend against Hull City, his first start for the club. After the game, Drury said:

"It is a bit more intense. You have to concentrate all the time because there's always somebody running off you. But it's about how I play really and I felt comfortable in myself

— Andy Drury, .

He was not offered a new contract and left Ipswich in the summer of 2013, having made 64 appearances for the club.

=== Crawley Town ===
Drury joined Crawley Town as a 93-day emergency loanee on 15 September 2011. He scored on his debut for the club two days later in a 3–1 victory over Bradford City. He returned to Ipswich when his loan spell expired, and was immediately selected for the New Year match against Nottingham Forest.

Crawley Town boss Steve Evans said after the loan, "The reality is despite how much I wanted him, the clubs could not agree on a transfer fee. I also think maybe his wages could have been a problem because it should not be forgotten they were heavily subsidised by Ipswich when he was on loan with us."

On 17 June 2013, Drury signed a new two-year contract with Crawley after being released by Ipswich Town

=== Luton Town (second spell) ===
Drury rejoined Luton Town for a £100,000 fee on 30 June 2014 after two previous bids had been rebuffed by Crawley. He made his debut on the opening game of the season, starting in a 1–0 win away to Carlisle United. Drury's second spell at the club never reached the heights of the first, and in July 2015 his contract was cancelled a year early by mutual consent.

=== Non-League ===
On 14 July 2015, Drury signed for National League club Eastleigh.

Drury joined Isthmian League Premier Division club Cray Wanderers as player-assistant manager in May 2021 before departing the club following the departure of manager Danny Kedwell in December 2021.

In January 2022, Drury signed for Isthmian League Premier Division side Folkestone Invicta. Following spells as manager at Whitstable Town and Margate, he resumed his playing career by signing for Isthmian League South East Division club Chatham Town in January 2023.

== Managerial career ==
On 22 March 2022, Isthmian League South East Division side Whitstable Town announced the appointment of Drury as club manager.

Following the departure of Jay Saunders, Drury was appointed manager of Isthmian League Premier Division club Margate.

He was dismissed on 26 December 2022 with Margate 16th in the table.

In November 2023, Drury was named player-manager of Folkestone Invicta having previously held the role of player-coach. On 8 March 2025, he was sacked with the club sitting 13th in the table.

On 27 January 2026, Drury was appointed manager of Southern Counties East Premier Division side Hythe Town, with the club bottom of the league at the time of his appointment. Just two months after joining the club, he announced his resignation.

== Honours ==
Lewes

- Conference South: 2007–08

Stevenage Borough

- FA Trophy: 2008–09
- Conference Premier: 2009–10
