= Lee Boylan =

English footballer (born 1978)

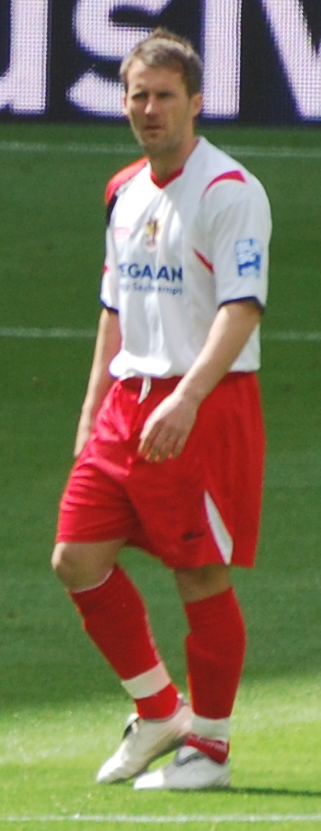
- Boylan playing for Stevenage Borough in the 2009 FA Trophy Final

Personal information
- Full name: Lee Martin Boylan
- Date of birth: 2 September 1978 (age 48)
- Place of birth: Witham, England
- Height: 5 ft 6 in (1.68 m)
- Position: Striker

Youth career
- 1995–1996: West Ham United

Senior career*
Years	Team	Apps	(Gls)
1996–1999	West Ham United	1	(0)
1998–1999	→ Kingstonian (loan)	18	(0)
1999	Trelleborg	2	(1)
1999–2000	Exeter City	6	(1)
2000	Kingstonian	11	(0)
2000–2001	Hayes	12	(3)
2001	Stevenage	1	(0)
2001–2006	Canvey Island	238	(202)
2006–2007	Grays Athletic	21	(3)
2007	→ Chelmsford City (loan)	12	(8)
2007–2008	Cambridge United	32	(11)
2008–2011	Stevenage	58	(17)
2011	Chelmsford City	5	(0)
2011–2012	Thurrock	38	(15)
2012–2013	AFC Sudbury	14	(8)
2013–2014	Maldon & Tiptree	19	(3)
Total		428	(218)

International career
1996	Republic of Ireland U18	6	(1)
1998	Republic of Ireland U21	1	(0)
2004	England C	1	(0)
- * Club domestic league appearances and goals as of 22:49, 27 April 2013 (UTC)

Lee Martin Boylan (born 2 September 1978) is a former footballer who played as a striker.

Boylan began his career with West Ham United in 1995, and progressed through the club's youth academy. He played one game for West Ham in the Premier League, as a substitute during the latter stages of the 1996–97 season. He was sent out on loan to Kingstonian in 1998, and was released on his return to his parent club in 1999. He had brief spells with Trelleborg in Sweden and with Exeter City, before rejoining Kingstonian on a permanent basis in 2000. He left the club in November 2000, and played for Hayes and Stevenage during the final months of the 2000–01 season.

Ahead of the 2001–02 season, Boylan joined Canvey Island, where he played 210 games and scored 176 goals for the club during a five-year spell. When Canvey resigned from the Conference in 2006, he joined Grays Athletic on a one-year contract, but was later loaned to Chelmsford City after struggling for first-team appearances at Grays. Boylan joined Cambridge United on a free transfer shortly before the 2007–08 season, as Cambridge narrowly missed out on promotion to the Football League in May 2008. He joined Stevenage for an undisclosed fee in June 2008, scoring in the 2009 FA Trophy Final victory against York City at Wembley Stadium in May 2009. Boylan was also part of the Stevenage team that won promotion to the Football League the following season.

Boylan left Stevenage in January 2011 and subsequently re-joined Chelmsford City in March of the same year. After just five appearances for Chelmsford, Boylan joined Thurrock for the rest of the 2010–11 season. He spent a further season at Thurrock, before leaving the club following their relegation. In July 2012, Boylan joined AFC Sudbury. Midway through the 2012–13 season, Boylan signed for divisional rivals Maldon & Tiptree, which would be his last club before retiring from playing.

== Early life ==
Born in Witham, Essex, Boylan attended John Bramston School.

== Club career ==
=== Early career ===
Boylan began his career with West Ham United in 1996, playing regularly in the club's youth team, as well as in the FA Youth Cup Final defeat at the end of the 1995–96 season, starting alongside Rio Ferdinand and Frank Lampard. Boylan made one Premier League appearance, as an 89th-minute substitute in a 5–1 victory over Sheffield Wednesday on 3 May 1997. After a loan spell with Kingstonian during the 1998–99 season, he joined Trelleborg in Sweden on a permanent basis in 1999, playing two games for the club and scoring one goal. He returned to England in November 1999, and signed for Exeter City. Boylan made his debut for Exeter in the club's 1–0 defeat to Halifax Town, coming on as a substitute in the 69th minute. He scored his first goal for the club in his third game, scoring Exeter's first goal in a 3–2 victory against Torquay United. It was to be Boylan's only goal for Exeter, as he played eight times before leaving the club in January 2000. He signed for Kingstonian, who he had previously played for on loan, on a free transfer a month after leaving Exeter, signing a contract until the end of the season. He made his debut in Kingstonian's 1–0 win against Stevenage Borough. Boylan made 15 appearances for Kingstonian in all competitions without scoring. He was released at the end of the season.

Boylan was without a club in the opening months of the 2000–01 season, before he joined Hayes in November 2000, making his debut in a 1–0 home defeat to Telford United. He scored his first goal for the club in a 3–1 away defeat to Dagenham & Redbridge in the FA Cup, scoring with a low shot from just inside the area. Despiting playing regularly, Boylan left Hayes in February 2001, and signed for another Conference National club in the form of Stevenage Borough two months later. He played one game for the club before being released, starting in Stevenage's 1–1 draw with Morecambe, playing 69 minutes before being substituted.

=== Canvey Island ===
Ahead of the 2001–02 season, Boylan signed a part-time contract with Canvey Island, making his debut in Canvey's first game of the season, coming on as a 66th-minute substitute in a 5–1 away victory against Chesham United. Three days later, he started his first game in a 3–1 home defeat to Aldershot Town, scoring just before half-time. He scored four goals in a 6–1 victory against Heybridge Swifts. During his first season with Canvey, Boylan finished as the club's top goalscorer, scoring 44 times in all competitions. He opted to stay at Canvey for the 2002–03 season. Boylan scored his first goal of the season on 7 September 2002, scoring Canvey's sixth goal in the 88th-minute in a 6–1 victory against Aylesbury United. He ended the season by scoring six goals in two games, which included scoring four times against Enfield in a 10–1 victory. Boylan scored 45 goals in 52 appearances during the season as Canvey finished the Isthmian Premier season in second-place for the second season running.

During the 2003–04 season, Boylan set a club and league record when he scored in 11 consecutive games, spanning from December 2003 to February 2004. Canvey also won all eleven matches. During the 11 games, Boylan scored 21 times, which included consecutive hat-tricks against Bishop's Stortford and Billericay Town, and braces against Ford Utd, Maidenhead United, Northwood, and Hayes. He scored a hat-trick, his third of the season, in Canvey's 3–2 victory against Hornchurch on the final game of the 2003–04 season, as Canvey finally won promotion to the highest tier in non-league football after winning the Isthmian Premier title. He also scored in the FA Trophy final as Canvey lost 3–2 to Hednesford Town at Villa Park on 24 May 2004, scoring from a header just after half-time. Boylan scored 57 goals in 53 appearances in all competitions. On Boylan playing in the Conference National, Canvey manager Jeff King said "I have no doubts about his ability to score goals in the Conference. It's a team effort which is why Lee was happy to sign a new contract here last year".

Boylan started in Canvey's first game back in the Conference National during the 2004–05 season, playing the whole match as the club drew 0–0 with Carlisle United at Brunton Park, with Boylan "carving out a number of opportunities". He scored his first goal of the season in a 1–1 draw against Gravesend & Northfleet on 17 August 2004. He scored a "clinical" hat-trick in Canvey's 3–1 away win against Farnborough Town at Cherrywood Road in September 2004. After scoring Canvey's second goal in a 4–1 away victory against Stevenage at Broadhall Way, Boylan was stretchered off after 27 minutes having suffered a fractured ankle. He was subsequently ruled out for three months after seeing a specialist to gauge the full extent of the injury. Boylan returned to first-team action in late December 2004, coming on as a 77th-minute substitute in a 2–2 draw with Woking. Boylan scored 16 goals in 31 games as Canvey avoided relegation to remain in the highest tier of non-league football.

Boylan signed a one-year contract extension ahead of the 2005–06 season, and played in the club's opening game of the season, a 1–0 defeat to Accrington Stanley. He scored his first goals of the season in a 2–1 victory against Aldershot Town on 16 August 2005; both goals coming in the final four minutes of the match. He also scored twice in a 2–1 away win at Burton Albion, his second goal was a volley from 25 yards out. Boylan's two goals also condemned Burton to their first ever defeat at the Pirelli Stadium, as well as becoming the first player to score two goals at the stadium. He scored in Canvey's FA Trophy victory against Kingstonian, but was taken to hospital shortly after scoring having collided with the goal post and suffered facial injuries. The injury subsequently ruled him out for up to three months, and he returned to the first-team on 11 March 2006, coming on as a 60th-minute substitute and marking his comeback with a goal, scoring an injury-time winning goal in a 1–0 victory against Altrincham at Moss Lane. He scored in the final game of the season in Canvey's 2–0 away win against Halifax Town, latching onto a through pass and scoring from just outside the box, having already assisted Jason Hallett's early goal. The goal proved to be Boylan's last goal for the club, after Canvey announced that they would be resigning from the Conference National in May 2006, after manager Jeff King said he would withdraw his investment. Boylan ended the season having made 29 appearances, scoring 14 times. During his five years with the Essex club, Boylan made 210 appearances and scored 176 goals.

=== Grays and Chelmsford ===
On his release from Canvey shortly after the club's resignation from the Conference, he joined Grays Athletic on a one-year contract, and made his debut in the club's first game of 2006–07 season, starting in a 1–1 draw against Stafford Rangers. Boylan scored his first goal for Grays in a 1–1 draw with Cambridge United on 4 November 2006, scoring with a "neat finish" from 12 yards. Boylan made 16 starting appearances for the club, scoring three goals, and a day after playing as an 88th-minute substitute in Grays' victory against Welling United, he joined Conference South club Chelmsford City on 26 February 2007 on loan for the remainder of the season. Boylan made his Chelmsford debut a day after joining the club, scoring in the club's 5–1 win against Carshalton Athletic, playing 76 minutes of the match. He played 12 games for Chelmsford, scoring eight times. After returning to Grays in May 2007, Boylan was released.

=== Cambridge United ===
At the end of the 2006–07 season, he joined Cambridge United on a free transfer on 17 May 2007, and made his debut in the club's 2–1 away win at York City on 10 August 2007, scoring from the penalty spot as Cambridge came from a goal behind to win the game. Boylan did not score for four months and was used as a substitute throughout February 2008. He made the starting line-up against York City on 1 March 2008, and scored twice in a 2–0 victory. Boylan started in the club's 1–0 defeat to Exeter City in the play-off final at Wembley Stadium on 15 May 2008, playing the first 69 minutes of the match before he was substituted. Boylan played 38 times throughout the campaign, scoring 12 goals. After the defeat, Boylan was placed on the transfer-list by Cambridge United in May 2008, and despite placing him on the transfer list, the club made "late efforts to persuade him to stay". On being placed on the transfer list, Boylan said "as soon as Jimmy Quinn said to me that I was not in his plans for next year my heart just was not at the club any more".

=== Stevenage ===
Boylan signed for fellow Conference Premier club Stevenage Borough for an undisclosed fee on 7 June 2008. After signing for the club, Boylan stated that manager Graham Westley had phoned him "five or six times a day and really wanted me at the club". He made his debut for the Hertfordshire club as a substitute in a 5–0 defeat against Wrexham at the Racecourse Ground on 9 August 2008, and scored his first goal for Stevenage in the 4–1 victory over Burton Albion on 6 September 2008. A brace against Kidderminster Harriers on 21 April 2009 ensured Boylan ended the season with ten league goals. He made 39 appearances during the 2008–09 campaign, scoring 14 times in all competitions. He also started in five of the club's successful FA Trophy campaign during the same season, scoring four times. This included scoring the second goal in Stevenage's 2–0 win against York City in the Final at Wembley Stadium on 9 May 2009, latching onto a through ball before hitting a "looping shot" over the goalkeeper to seal the victory in injury-time.

Boylan remained at Stevenage ahead of the 2009–10 season, starting in the club's first game of the season at home to Tamworth on 8 August 2009, scoring a penalty in a 1–1 draw. The goal was also the first goal of the 2009–10 Conference National season. He scored twice against former club Cambridge United in Stevenage's 4–1 victory on 1 January 2010, a victory that meant Stevenage went top of the Conference Premier league table. He scored eight times in 26 appearances during the season, as Stevenage won the Conference Premier title and consequently earned promotion to the Football League for the first time in the club's history. Boylan left Stevenage when his contract expired on 13 January 2011.

=== Return to non-League ===
After an unsuccessful trial at Southend United, Boylan signed for Conference South club Chelmsford City on a free transfer on 5 March 2011. He made his debut for Chelmsford on the same day as his signing was announced, replacing Wayne Gray as a 79th-minute substitute in Chelmsford's 2–1 away defeat at Eastleigh. Boylan made a further four appearances for Chelmsford, all of which were from the substitute's bench, before being released by the club on 30 March 2011. A day later, Boylan joined Conference South rivals Thurrock until the end of the 2010–11 season. He scored a hat-trick on his debut in a 3–0 win against Weston-super-Mare, a win that moved Thurrock four points away from the relegation zone. Boylan scored five goals in six matches for Thurrock, although the club were relegated as a result of finishing in 20th position, the final relegation place. However, they were later reprieved following the demise of Rushden & Diamonds, meaning Thurrock remained in the Conference South for the 2011–12 season. Boylan opted to stay at Thurrock for the 2011–12 campaign, scoring on the first day of the season in a 1–1 draw away at Salisbury City on 13 August 2011. He went on to score twelve times in 34 appearances for the club during the campaign, finishing as the club's top goalscorer. Thurrock were relegated from the Conference South after finishing in last place, and Boylan left the club in May 2012.

Boylan joined Isthmian League Division One North club AFC Sudbury on 27 July 2012, taking on dual responsibilities as a player-coach. He made his debut for the club on the opening day of the 2012–13 season, a 3–1 home defeat to Cheshunt on 18 August 2012. Three days later, he scored his first goal for AFC Sudbury in a 3–1 away loss to Maldon & Tiptree – briefly restoring parity in the match when he scored from Michael Shinn's corner. In January 2013, Boylan joined divisional rivals Maldon & Tiptree, making his debut as a 61st-minute substitute in a 0–0 home draw with Waltham Abbey on 12 January. Two weeks later, in his second appearance for the club, he scored in a 2–2 draw against Redbridge. He added two further goals a month later in Maldon's 5–1 home victory over Brentwood Town. Boylan continued to play regularly for Maldon & Tiptree for the remainder of the 2012–13 season, and scored three times in their play-off campaign as they lost 4–1 on penalties to Thamesmead Town in the final. He made 21 appearances in all competitions for the club that season, scoring six goals.

== International career ==
Boylan played for the Republic of Ireland national under-19 football team in the 1997 UEFA European Under-18 Football Championship finals in Iceland scoring against Israel. He represented the Republic of Ireland under-21 team when he was contracted to West Ham United, making his debut in a 3–0 defeat to Czech Republic, a game in which he suffered an injury after just 20 minutes and was stretchered off. In 2004, he played for the England C team, earning a solitary cap.

== Personal life ==
Boylan was married in Watford, Hertfordshire, in May 2001.

== Career statistics ==
Appearances and goals by club, season and competition
Club	Season	League (Note: Includes Football League, Football Conference, Isthmian League and Swedish Superettan.)		FA Cup		League Cup		Other (Note: Includes FA Trophy, Football League Trophy and Isthmian League play-offs.)		Total	
Club	Season	Apps	Goals	Apps	Goals	Apps	Goals	Apps	Goals	Apps	Goals
West Ham United	1996–97	1	0	0	0	0	0	0	0	1	0
West Ham United	1997–98	0	0	0	0	0	0	0	0	0	0
West Ham United	1998–99	0	0	0	0	0	0	0	0	0	0
West Ham United	Total	1	0	0	0	0	0	0	0	1	0
Kingstonian	1998–99	18	1	1	0	0	0	2	0	21	1
Trelleborg	1998–99	2	1	0	0	0	0	0	0	2	1
Exeter City	1999–2000	6	1	2	0	0	0	0	0	8	1
Kingstonian	1999–2000	11	0	0	0	0	0	4	0	15	0
Hayes	2000–01	12	3	1	1	0	0	0	0	13	4
Stevenage Borough	2000–01	1	0	0	0	0	0	0	0	1	0
Canvey Island	2001–02	38	39	4	2	0	0	3	3	45	44
Canvey Island	2002–03	45	40	2	1	0	0	5	4	52	45
Canvey Island	2003–04	42	43	4	8	0	0	6	6	53	57
Canvey Island	2004–05	28	14	1	0	0	0	2	2	31	16
Canvey Island	2005–06	25	12	1	1	0	0	3	1	29	14
Canvey Island	Total	178	148	12	12	0	0	19	16	210	176
Grays Athletic	2006–07	21	3	0	0	0	0	1	0	22	3
Chelmsford City	2006–07	12	8	0	0	0	0	0	0	12	8
Cambridge United	2007–08	32	11	3	1	0	0	3	0	38	12
Stevenage	2008–09	34	10	0	0	0	0	5	4	39	14
Stevenage	2009–10	23	7	0	0	0	0	3	1	26	8
Stevenage	2010–11	1	0	0	0	1	0	0	0	2	0
Stevenage	Total	58	17	0	0	1	0	8	5	67	22
Chelmsford City	2010–11	5	0	0	0	0	0	0	0	5	0
Thurrock	2010–11	6	5	0	0	0	0	0	0	6	5
Thurrock	2011–12	32	10	2	2	0	0	0	0	34	12
Thurrock	Total	38	15	2	2	0	0	0	0	40	17
AFC Sudbury	2012–13	14	8	1	2	0	0	0	0	15	10
Maldon & Tiptree	2012–13	19	3	0	0	0	0	2	3	21	6
Career total		415	206	22	18	1	0	39	24	491	261

== Honours ==
Canvey Island

- Isthmian League Premier Division: 2003–04

Stevenage

- FA Trophy: 2008–09; runner-up: 2009–10
- Conference Premier: 2009–10
