= Mark Albrighton =

English footballer (born 1976)

Personal information
- Full name: Mark Christopher Albrighton
- Date of birth: 6 March 1976 (age 50)
- Place of birth: Nuneaton, England
- Height: 6 ft 1 in (1.85 m)
- Position: Defender

Team information
- Current team: Coventry Sphinx

Senior career*
Years	Team	Apps	(Gls)
1998–1999	Atherstone United	25	(2)
1999–2002	Telford United	74	(8)
2002–2006	Doncaster Rovers	86	(5)
2006	→ Chester City (loan)	9	(0)
2006–2007	Boston United	12	(0)
2006	→ Darlington (loan)	3	(0)
2007	→ Rushden & Diamonds (loan)	17	(1)
2007–2008	Cambridge United	40	(2)
2008–2010	Stevenage Borough	44	(1)
2010–2011	Kidderminster Harriers	30	(0)
2011–2012	Nuneaton Town	19	(0)
2012–2013	Barwell	34	(0)
2013–2019	Bedworth United	77	(2)
2019–2021	Coventry Sphinx		
- * Club domestic league appearances and goals

Mark Christopher Albrighton (born 6 March 1976) is an English retired footballer who played for a number of clubs in the English lower leagues.

== Career ==
Born in Nuneaton, Warwickshire, Albrighton started his career at Atherstone United, then of the Southern League Premier Division, before joining Telford United in September 1999 for a fee of £10,000. He made his debut for the Shropshire side shortly after in a 3–1 victory over Yeovil Town, making a further 16 appearances during the 1999–00, scoring once in the process. He played 27 times throughout the club's 2000–01 campaign, scoring twice. Albrighton continued his run in the first-team the following season, scoring 5 times from defence, and appearing 30 times. Before the start of the 2002–03 season, Albrighton joined Doncaster Rovers on a free transfer. He made his debut for the club in a 5–1 victory against Dagenham & Redbridge, and scored his first goal in November 2002, in a 2–0 win over Hereford United. He made a total of 29 appearances during the season, and helped guide the club to promotion via the Conference National play-offs. Albrighton adjusted well to league football, playing 30 games for the Yorkshire side and ensuring back-to-back promotions as the club reached the third tier of English football.

The 2004–05 season witnessed Albrighton struggle for both fitness and first-team appearances, and he made 17 appearances, scoring once in a 1–0 win at MK Dons. He played a further 19 games for Doncaster the next season, but was loaned out to Chester City in February 2006. He made his Chester debut in a 1–0 defeat against Grimsby Town at Blundell Park and played a further eight games for the club after having his loan deal extended for a further month. He returned to Doncaster in April 2006, and made his last appearance for the club in a 2–1 defeat at Bradford City.

Albrighton was released by Doncaster in May 2006, and subsequently joined Boston United in the same month. Albrighton made 14 appearances for the Lincolnshire outfit, making his debut in a 3–2 defeat at Grimsby Town. However, first-team appearances were limited and he was loaned out to League Two rivals Darlington in November 2006. Albrighton featured three times during his one-month loan spell for the Quakers, before returning to his parent club in December. He was loaned out again in January 2007, this time to Conference National outfit Rushden & Diamonds. Albrighton impressed under manager Graham Westley, helping the side stay unbeaten throughout the month, and his loan spell was consequently extended until the end of the season. He returned to Boston in April 2007, but was released a month later and joined Cambridge United on a one-year contract. He made his debut for the Cambridgeshire side in a 2–1 victory away to York City at Bootham Crescent, and scored his first goal in a 5–1 rout of Farsley Celtic a week later. Albrighton featured a total of 45 times for the club, scoring twice, as they narrowly missed out on a return to the Football League following a 1–0 play-off final defeat to Exeter City. He was voted 'Cambridge United Player of the Year' for the 2007–08 season.

In May 2008, Albrighton rejected a one-year contract extension at Cambridge, and opted to join Conference National rivals Stevenage Borough on a two-year deal for an undisclosed fee. The move reunited Albrighton with Stevenage manager Graham Westley, who had also signed the player during his time at Rushden. He was initially made captain by Westley, although later lost his captaincy following a spell out of the first-team. He scored his first goal for the Hertfordshire side in a 2–0 home win against Salisbury City, and played a total of 32 games during the 2008–09 season. Albrighton played a further 19 games during the club's successful 2009–10 campaign, a season in which Stevenage would win the Conference National title, but was released by Graham Westley at the end of the season.

In late June 2010, Albrighton signed for Conference National outfit Kidderminster Harriers on a free transfer. He made his Kidderminster debut in the club's first game of the 2010–11 season, playing the whole match in the centre of defence in a 2–1 away win against York City.

On 19 August 2019, 43-year old Albrighton joined Coventry Sphinx.

== Career statistics ==
As of 28 January 2012.

Club	Season	League^{[A]}		FA Cup		League Cup		Other^{[B]}		Total	
Club	Season	Apps	Goals	Apps	Goals	Apps	Goals	Apps	Goals	Apps	Goals
Atherstone United	1998–99	25	2	0	0	0	0	0	0	25	2
Telford United	1999–2000	17	1	0	0	0	0	0	0	17	1
Telford United	2000–01	26	2	2	0	0	0	1	0	29	2
Telford United	2001–02	31	5	1	0	0	0	3	0	35	5
Telford United	Total	74	8	3	0	0	0	4	0	81	8
Doncaster Rovers	2002–03	25	1	1	0	0	0	3	1	29	2
Doncaster Rovers	2003–04	28	3	1	0	0	0	1	0	30	3
Doncaster Rovers	2004–05	17	1	0	0	1	0	1	0	19	1
Doncaster Rovers	2005–06	16	0	1	0	2	0	1	0	20	0
Doncaster Rovers	Total	86	5	3	0	3	0	6	1	98	6
Chester City	2005–06	9	0	0	0	0	0	0	0	9	0
Boston United	2006–07	12	0	1	0	0	0	1	0	14	0
Darlington	2006–07	3	0	0	0	0	0	0	0	3	0
Rushden & Diamonds	2006–07	17	1	0	0	0	0	0	0	17	1
Cambridge United	2007–08	40	2	2	0	0	0	3	0	45	2
Stevenage	2008–09	29	1	2	0	0	0	1	0	32	1
Stevenage	2009–10	15	0	0	0	0	0	4	0	19	0
Stevenage	Total	44	1	2	0	0	0	5	0	51	1
Kidderminster Harriers	2010–11	30	0	0	0	0	0	0	0	30	0
Nuneaton Town	2011–12	19	0	3	0	0	0	2	0	24	0
Career total		359	19	14	0	3	0	21	1	397	20

A. The "League" column constitutes appearances and goals (including those as a substitute) in the Football League, Football Conference and Southern Football League.
B. The "Other" column constitutes appearances and goals (including those as a substitute) in the FA Trophy and Football League Trophy.

== Honours ==
Doncaster Rovers

- Football League Third Division: 2003–04
- Conference National play-offs: 2003

Stevenage

- Conference National: 2009–10
- FA Trophy: 2008–09
