= List of Stevenage F.C. seasons =

Stevenage Football Club is an English association football club based in Stevenage, Hertfordshire. The team competes in EFL League One, the third tier of English football. The club was founded in 1976 as Stevenage Borough Football Club following the bankruptcy of the town's former team, Stevenage Athletic. They assumed senior status and played their first competitive match in the United Counties Football League in August 1980. They have played their home games at Broadhall Way since the club's formation.

This list details the club's achievements in first-team competitions, and the top goalscorer for each season. Top goalscorers highlighted in yellow were also the highest scorers in the division in which Stevenage competed during that season.

== History ==
In their first season as a senior club, Stevenage Borough won the United Counties League Division One title and the United Counties League Cup. In 1984, they joined Division Two North of the Isthmian League, earning promotion to Division One the following season. They were relegated two years later, but won the Division Two North title in the 1990–91 season after amassing 107 points. Stevenage won the Isthmian Premier Division in the 1993–94 season, earning promotion to the Football Conference. Two seasons later, they won the Conference but were denied promotion to the Football League because Broadhall Way did not meet the required ground standards. Stevenage reached the third round of the FA Cup for the first time in the 1996–97 season. The following season, they progressed to the fourth round, where they were drawn against Premier League club Newcastle United. Stevenage held Newcastle to a 1–1 draw at Broadhall Way before losing the replay 2–1 at St James' Park.

During the 2001–02 season, Stevenage reached the FA Trophy final for the first time, losing 2–0 to Yeovil Town at Villa Park. Three years later, they reached the Conference National play-offs after finishing fifth in the 2004–05 season, but lost 1–0 to Carlisle United in the final at the Britannia Stadium. Stevenage reached the FA Trophy final again in the 2006–07 season, overcoming a 2–0 deficit to defeat Kidderminster Harriers 3–2 in front of a record FA Trophy crowd of 53,262 at the newly built Wembley Stadium, becoming the first team to win a competitive final there. They returned to the final two years later, beating York City 2–0. Stevenage secured promotion to the Football League by winning the Conference Premier in the 2009–10 season. They amassed 99 points, finishing 11 points clear at the top of the table, and entered the Football League for the first time in the club's history, competing in League Two.

Following promotion, the club dropped the name 'Borough' from its title in June 2010. In their first season in the Football League, Stevenage finished sixth in League Two and reached the play-offs, defeating Torquay United 1–0 in the final at Old Trafford in May 2011 to secure a second successive promotion to League One. They also reached the fourth round of the FA Cup, defeating Newcastle United 3–1 in the third round before losing to Reading. Stevenage finished sixth in their first League One season in 2011–12, their highest league finish, and reached the play-offs, where they were defeated by Sheffield United in the semi-finals. They also reached the FA Cup fifth round for the first time, drawing 0–0 with Tottenham Hotspur at Broadhall Way before losing 3–1 in the replay at White Hart Lane. The club was relegated to League Two in the 2013–14 season, but reached the play-offs the following season after finishing sixth, losing to Southend United in the semi-finals.

Stevenage were bottom of League Two when the 2019–20 season was suspended in March 2020 due to the COVID-19 pandemic. They were initially relegated after an independent disciplinary panel deducted two points from Macclesfield Town for failing to pay their players on six occasions, but the English Football League successfully appealed the decision. The appeal resulted in four previously suspended points also being deducted from Macclesfield's total, meaning Stevenage finished 23rd and retained their League Two status. Stevenage earned promotion to League One after finishing second in League Two during the 2022–23 season. They recorded their joint-highest Football League finish in the 2025–26 season, finishing sixth in League One, before losing to Stockport County in the play-off semi-finals.

== Seasons ==
Season	League									FA Cup	FA Trophy	Other competitions		Top scorer (Note: Includes goals scored in the FA Cup, FA Vase, Football League Trophy, Conference National (including playoffs), Football League (including playoffs), Football League Cup, FA Trophy and Conference League Cup.)	
Season	Division	P	W	D	L	F	A	Pts	Pos	FA Cup	FA Trophy	Other competitions		Top scorer	
1980–81	UCL-1 (Note: Stevenage Borough joined United Counties League Division One before the start of the 1980–81 season.) (↑)	32	23	7	2	106	35	53	1st	N/A (Note: Stevenage Borough did not enter the FA Cup until the 1983–84 season. The club became eligible to enter the FA Trophy upon reaching the Isthmian Division One in the 1986–87 season, but lost eligibility following relegation to the Isthmian League Division Two North in 1988 and did not re-enter the competition until 1991.)	N/A	United Counties League Cup	W	Trevor Metcalfe	29
1981–82	UCL-P	36	12	9	15	50	49	33	12th	N/A	N/A			Danny Dance	13
1982–83	UCL-P	34	10	10	14	51	56	30	12th	N/A	N/A	FA Vase	PRER	Ronnie Lear	13
1983–84	UCL-P	36	16	9	11	52	46	41	6th	QR1	N/A	FA Vase	R2	Paddy Butcher	14
1984–85	Isth-2N (Note: Stevenage Borough joined Isthmian Division 2 North for the 1984–85 season as a result of a re-structuring of the National League System.)	38	23	6	9	79	49	75 (Note: The 1984–85 season saw the introduction of three points for a win. Although this rule came into play for the Football League in 1981, it was not introduced in the Isthmian League until 1984.)	4th	QR2	N/A	FA Vase	R2	Steve Armsby	30
1985–86	Isth-2N (↑)	38	26	6	6	71	24	84	1st	QR1	N/A	FA Vase	QF	Martin Gittings	33
1986–87	Isth-1	42	12	11	19	61	67	47	16th	QR3	QR2			Ricky Marshall	17
1987–88	Isth-1 (↓)	42	11	9	22	36	64	42	21st	QR1	QR3			Adrian Taylor	9
1988–89	Isth-2N	42	20	13	9	84	55	73	4th	QR2	N/A	FA Vase	PRER	Martin Gittings	24
1989–90	Isth-2N	42	21	16	5	70	31	79	4th	QR1	N/A	FA Vase	R3	Rob McComb	23
1990–91	Isth-2N (↑)	42	34	5	3	122	29	107	1st	QR1	N/A	FA Vase	R1	Jimmy Hughes	32
1991–92	Isth-1 (↑)	40	30	6	4	95	37	96	1st	QR1	QR1			Martin Gittings	44
1992–93	Isth-P	42	18	8	16	62	60	62	7th	QR3	R2			Martin Gittings	33
1993–94	Isth-P (↑)	42	31	4	7	88	39	97	1st	QR4	R1			Martin Gittings	40
1994–95	Conf	42	20	7	15	68	49	67	5th	QR2	R3			Barry Hayles	15
1995–96	Conf	42	27	10	5	101	44	91	1st (Note: After winning the Football Conference in the 1995–96 season, the club were denied promotion to the Football League due to insufficient ground facilities.)	R1 (Note: The first time the club reached the FA Cup first round proper.)	QF			Barry Hayles	34 ♦
1996–97	Conf	42	24	10	8	87	53	82	3rd	R3	SF			Barry Hayles	25
1997–98	Conf	42	13	12	17	59	63	51	15th	R4	QF			Gary Crawshaw	16
1998–99	Conf	42	17	17	8	62	45	68	6th	R2	R4			Carl Alford	33
1999–2000	Conf	42	16	9	17	60	54	57	10th	QR4	R3			Carl Alford	26
2000–01	Conf	42	15	18	9	71	61	63	7th	QR4	R5			Neil Illman	17
2001–02	Conf	42	15	10	17	57	60	55	11th	QR4	RU	Football League Trophy	R1S	Jean-Michel Sigere	12
2002–03	Conf	42	14	10	18	61	55	52	12th	R2	R4	Football League Trophy	R2S	Kirk Jackson	8
2003–04	Conf	42	18	9	15	58	52	63	8th	R2	R4	Football League Trophy	R1S	Anthony Elding	19
2004–05	Conf	42	22	6	14	65	52	72	5th (Note: Lost in the play-off final to Carlisle United 1–0 at the Britannia Stadium.)	R2	R3	Conference League Cup	SFS	Anthony Elding	22
2004–05	Conf	42	22	6	14	65	52	72	5th	R2	R3	Football League Trophy	R1S	Anthony Elding	22
2005–06	Conf	42	19	12	11	62	47	69	6th	R2	R1	Football League Trophy	R1S	Darryn Stamp	13
2006–07	Conf	46	20	10	16	76	66	70	8th	R1	W			Steve Morison	34
2007–08	Conf	46	24	7	15	82	55	79	6th	R1	R1	Conference League Cup	R1S	Steve Morison	23
2008–09	Conf	46	23	12	11	73	54	81	5th (Note: Lost in the play-off semi-finals to Cambridge United 4–3 on aggregate.)	R1	W	Conference League Cup	R4S	Steve Morison	32
2009–10	Conf (↑)	44 (Note: Chester City were expelled from the league on 26 February 2010 and their results were expunged on 8 March. Therefore, Stevenage's 1–0 and 2–0 victories over them were removed from the records. Consequently, there were 44 Conference Premier fixtures during the 2009–10 season, as opposed to 46.)	30	9	5	79	24	99	1st	R1	RU			Yemi Odubade	16
2010–11	L2 (↑)	46	18	15	13	62	45	69	6th (Note: Stevenage beat Torquay United 1–0 in the 2011 play-off final at Old Trafford, meaning the club were promoted to League One.)	R4	N/A	Football League Cup	R1	Byron Harrison; John Mousinho	8
2010–11	L2 (↑)	46	18	15	13	62	45	69	6th	R4	N/A	Football League Trophy	R1S	Byron Harrison; John Mousinho	8
2011–12	L1	46	18	19	9	69	44	73	6th (Note: Lost in the play-off semi-finals to Sheffield United 1–0 on aggregate. Also joint-highest league finish.)	R5	N/A	Football League Cup	R1	Chris Beardsley	10
2011–12	L1	46	18	19	9	69	44	73	6th	R5	N/A	Football League Trophy	R2S	Chris Beardsley	10
2012–13	L1	46	15	9	22	47	64	54	18th	R1	N/A	Football League Cup	R2	Lucas Akins	10
2012–13	L1	46	15	9	22	47	64	54	18th	R1	N/A	Football League Trophy	R1S	Lucas Akins	10
2013–14	L1 (↓)	46	11	9	26	46	72	42	24th	R4	N/A	Football League Cup	R2	François Zoko	16
2013–14	L1 (↓)	46	11	9	26	46	72	42	24th	R4	N/A	Football League Trophy	SFS	François Zoko	16
2014–15	L2	46	20	12	14	62	54	72	6th (Note: Lost in the play-off semi-finals to Southend United 4–2 on aggregate.)	R1	N/A	Football League Cup	R1	Charlie Lee	9
2014–15	L2	46	20	12	14	62	54	72	6th	R1	N/A	Football League Trophy	R1S	Charlie Lee	9
2015–16	L2	46	11	15	20	52	67	48	18th	R2	N/A	Football League Cup	R1	Chris Whelpdale	9
2015–16	L2	46	11	15	20	52	67	48	18th	R2	N/A	Football League Trophy	R2S	Chris Whelpdale	9
2016–17	L2	46	20	7	19	67	63	67	10th	R1	N/A	EFL Cup	R2	Matt Godden	21
2016–17	L2	46	20	7	19	67	63	67	10th	R1	N/A	EFL Trophy	R1S	Matt Godden	21
2017–18	L2	46	14	13	19	60	65	55	16th	R3	N/A	EFL Cup	R1	Danny Newton	16
2017–18	L2	46	14	13	19	60	65	55	16th	R3	N/A	EFL Trophy	R1S	Danny Newton	16
2018–19	L2	46	20	10	16	59	55	70	10th	R1	N/A	EFL Cup	R1	Kurtis Guthrie	14
2018–19	L2	46	20	10	16	59	55	70	10th	R1	N/A	EFL Trophy	R1S	Kurtis Guthrie	14
2019–20	L2	36 (Note: The 2019–20 season was ended early due to the COVID-19 pandemic. EFL clubs voted to end the season with immediate effect on 15 May 2020, with the final league table being determined on a points-per-game basis.)	3	13	20	24	50	22	23rd	R1	N/A	EFL Cup	R1	Charlie Carter	6
2019–20	L2	36	3	13	20	24	50	22	23rd	R1	N/A	EFL Trophy	QF	Charlie Carter	6
2020–21	L2	46	14	18	14	41	41	60	14th	R3	N/A	EFL Cup	R1	Elliott List	11
2020–21	L2	46	14	18	14	41	41	60	14th	R3	N/A	EFL Trophy	R1S	Elliott List	11
2021–22	L2	46	11	14	21	45	68	47	21st	R2	N/A	EFL Cup	R2	Luke Norris	16
2021–22	L2	46	11	14	21	45	68	47	21st	R2	N/A	EFL Trophy	R2S	Luke Norris	16
2022–23	L2 (↑)	46	24	13	7	61	39	85	2nd	R4	N/A	EFL Cup	R3	Luke Norris; Jamie Reid	14
2022–23	L2 (↑)	46	24	13	7	61	39	85	2nd	R4	N/A	EFL Trophy	R16S	Luke Norris; Jamie Reid	14
2023–24	L1	46	19	14	13	57	46	71	9th	R3	N/A	EFL Cup	R2	Jamie Reid	18
2023–24	L1	46	19	14	13	57	46	71	9th	R3	N/A	EFL Trophy	R1S	Jamie Reid	18
2024–25	L1	46	15	12	19	42	50	57	14th	R2	N/A	EFL Cup	R1	Dan Kemp	11
2024–25	L1	46	15	12	19	42	50	57	14th	R2	N/A	EFL Trophy	QFS	Dan Kemp	11
2025–26	L1	46	21	12	13	49	46	75	6th (Note: Lost in the play-off semi-finals to Stockport County 3–0 on aggregate. Also joint-highest league finish.)	R1	N/A	EFL Cup	R1	Jamie Reid	14
2025–26	L1	46	21	12	13	49	46	75	6th	R1	N/A	EFL Trophy	R32S	Jamie Reid	14
2026–27	L1										N/A	EFL Cup	R2		
2026–27	L1										N/A	EFL Trophy			

== Key ==
Key to colours and symbols:

Champions	Runners-up	Promoted ↑	Relegated ↓	Top league scorer in Stevenage's division ♦

Key to league record:

- P = Played
- W = Matches won
- D = Matches drawn
- L = Matches lost
- F = Goals for
- A = Goals against
- Pts = Points
- Pos = Final position

Key to league competitions:

- Conf = Conference National
- Isth-1 = Isthmian Division One
- Isth-2N = Isthmian Division 2 North
- Isth-P = Isthmian Premier Division
- L1 = League One
- L2 = League Two
- UCL-1 = United Counties League Division One
- UCL-P = United Counties League Premier Division

Key to cup record:

- PRER = Preliminary Round
- QR1 = First Qualifying Round
- QR3 = Third Qualifying Round
- QR4 = Fourth Qualifying Round
- R1 = Round 1
- R1S = Round 1 Southern Section
- R2 = Round 2
- R2S = Round 2 Southern Section
- R3 = Round 3
- R4 = Round 4
- R4S = Round 4 Southern Section
- R5 = Round 5
- R16S = Round of 16 Southern Section
- R32S = Round of 32 Southern Section
- QF = Quarter-finals
- QFS = Quarter-finals Southern Section
- SF = Semi-finals
- SFS = Semi-finals Southern Section
- RU = Runners-up
- W = Winners
