= Craig Reid (footballer, born 1985) =

English footballer (born 1985)

Personal information
- Full name: Craig Kevin Reid
- Date of birth: 17 December 1985 (age 40)
- Place of birth: Coventry, England
- Height: 5 ft 10 in (1.78 m)
- Position: Striker

Youth career
- 2000–2002: Coventry City
- 2002–2004: Ipswich Town

Senior career*
Years	Team	Apps	(Gls)
2004–2006	Coventry City	0	(0)
2006	→ Tamworth (loan)	2	(0)
2007–2008	Cheltenham Town	14	(0)
2008	Grays Athletic	3	(0)
2008	→ Newport County (loan)	10	(4)
2008–2011	Newport County	86	(54)
2011–2012	Stevenage	49	(8)
2012–2013	Aldershot Town	39	(11)
2013–2014	Southend United	6	(0)
2014	Stevenage	4	(0)
2014–2015	Kidderminster Harriers	35	(4)
2015	Brentwood Town	3	(0)
2015–2016	Lincoln City	2	(0)
2016	Gainsborough Trinity	12	(3)
2016–2017	Gloucester City	16	(1)
2017	Newport County	10	(0)
2017–2018	Coventry United	29	(14)
2018	→ Barwell (loan)	9	(1)
Total		329	(100)
- * Club domestic league appearances and goals

Craig Kevin Reid (born 17 December 1985) is an English former professional footballer who played as a striker.

Reid began his career in the youth academies of Coventry City and Ipswich Town before returning to Coventry under a professional contract in 2004. He spent a brief loan spell at Tamworth in March 2006 and was released by Coventry at the end of the 2005–06 season without making a first-team appearance. After a year and a half at Cheltenham Town, he joined Grays Athletic in August 2008 and soon moved to Newport County, where he was top goalscorer for three successive seasons and helped the club win promotion to the Conference Premier during the 2009–10 season.

In January 2011, he signed for Stevenage for a club-record £90,000 and contributed to their promotion to League One in his first season. He joined Aldershot Town in July 2012, before later spells at Southend United and a second stint with Stevenage. He went on to feature for several non-League clubs, including Kidderminster Harriers, Brentwood Town, Lincoln City, Gainsborough Trinity, and Gloucester City. Reid returned to Newport in 2017, before joining Coventry United, where he also spent time on loan at Barwell. He remained with Coventry United until the end of the 2017–18 season, which marked the conclusion of his playing career.

== Early life ==
Reid was born in Coventry. He supports his hometown club, Coventry City.

== Career ==
=== Early career ===
Reid began his career with hometown club Coventry City in their youth academy, before moving to Ipswich Town's academy following a successful trial in April 2002. After two years at Ipswich, he rejoined Coventry, this time on a professional contract. He was the club's Young Player of the Year for the 2004–05 season, and was offered a further one-year contract. In March 2006, Reid signed for Conference National club Tamworth on a one-month loan deal. He made his first-team debut the following day, starting in the club's 2–0 defeat to Gravesend & Northfleet at Stonebridge Road, and made one further appearance for the club. Upon returning to Coventry, at the end of the 2005–06 season, Reid was released, having not made a first-team appearance. In May 2006, Reid had an unsuccessful trial at Stockport County. Ahead of the 2006–07 season, he went on trial at Falkirk, and scored twice in a 2–1 pre-season friendly victory against Airdrie United in July 2006. Despite this, he was not offered a contract by the club. He later had another unsuccessful trial with Dundee in September 2006.

In January 2007, Reid signed for Cheltenham Town on a free transfer, signing a rolling monthly contract. He made his debut for the club on 13 January 2007, coming on as a 76th-minute substitute in a 2–0 away defeat to Huddersfield Town. He made five further appearances towards the latter stages of the 2006–07 season. In July 2007, Reid signed for Cheltenham on a permanent basis, and scored his first professional goal in a 3–1 away victory against Swindon Town in the Football League Trophy on 9 October 2007. He made 12 appearances for Cheltenham during the 2007–08 season, scoring once. Reid was released by the club on 6 May 2008, having made 18 appearances in all competitions. He signed for Conference Premier club Grays Athletic on a one-year deal in August 2008, making his debut in a 1–0 home defeat to Eastbourne Borough. He made two further appearances for Grays, before joining Conference South club Newport County on loan on 25 September 2008.

=== Newport County ===
Reid scored four times in ten league appearances during his loan spell at Newport, before signing for the club on a permanent basis on 19 December 2008. Reid scored his first senior hat-trick in Newport's 3–1 win against Chelmsford City in January 2009. He ended the season with 21 goals in 31 appearances in all competitions, 16 of which came in the Conference South. Reid remained at Newport for the 2009–10 season, and was named Conference South Player of the Month after scoring seven goals in five matches in September 2009. Reid finished the 2009–10 season as the division's top goalscorer with 24 goals, as Newport secured the Conference South title with a record 103 points. He was later named Conference South Player of the Year. Reid signed a new two-year contract with the club on 17 April 2010.

Reid started in Newport's first match of the 2010–11 season, the club's return to the Conference Premier, a 1–0 defeat to Darlington at the Darlington Arena on 14 August 2010. Three days later, he scored his first goal of the season, converting a 71st-minute penalty to earn Newport a point in a 1–1 draw against Tamworth. At the end of August 2010, Reid scored four goals in two games, registering successive braces in matches against Kidderminster Harriers and AFC Wimbledon. During the January 2011 transfer window, it was reported that he had attracted interest from Premier League club Stoke City, as well as from his former club, Coventry City. Reid's final two goals for Newport came in a 3–2 defeat to Tamworth at The Lamb Ground, which was Dean Holdsworth's last match in charge of the club. Reid made his last Conference appearance for the club on 29 January 2011, in a goalless draw away at Histon, during which he missed an 83rd-minute penalty. He scored 18 goals in 29 league appearances during the first half of the 2010–11 season. During his two-and-a-half-year spell at Newport, he scored 66 goals in 112 games in all competitions. Reid was inducted into Newport's Hall of Fame during the club's centenary celebrations on 27 October 2012.

=== Stevenage ===
Reid signed for League Two club Stevenage for an initial undisclosed fee on 31 January 2011, the fee was a record for both clubs; and Stevenage later stated that they paid £90,000 for the player. As part of the deal, Stevenage strikers Charlie Griffin and Yemi Odubade joined Newport on loan. Reid made his Stevenage debut in a 2–2 home draw with Accrington Stanley on 5 February 2011. He scored his first goal for the club in a 2–1 away victory against Oxford United on 15 March, running onto Rob Sinclair's through ball to secure all three points. On the final day of the regular season, Reid scored Stevenage's second goal from the penalty spot in a 3–3 draw with Bury; the result secured Stevenage a sixth-place finish and qualification to the play-offs. He started in all three of the club's play-off matches, including in the final at Old Trafford against Torquay United, which Stevenage won 1–0 to earn promotion to League One. Reid made 23 appearances for Stevenage during the second half of the 2010–11 season, scoring twice.

Reid scored his first goal of the 2011–12 season in a 3–1 away victory against AFC Bournemouth. He scored his fourth goal in five matches in a 5–1 victory against Sheffield Wednesday on 13 September 2011, reacting quickest to a parried Michael Bostwick shot to score from six yards. Reid suffered a groin injury in November 2011 that required surgery, and underwent a successful operation in January 2012. He returned to the first team on 28 February, after three and a half months out, playing 74 minutes of a 2–2 draw with Huddersfield Town. Reid went on to score goals in home victories over Brentford and Bury, the latter coming in a 3–0 win that ultimately secured Stevenage's place in the play-offs. He made 34 appearances during the season, scoring six goals, as Stevenage lost in the play-off semi-finals. During his one-and-a-half-year spell at the club, Reid made 57 appearances in all competitions, scoring eight times.

=== Aldershot Town ===
Ahead of the 2012–13 season, Reid signed for League Two club Aldershot Town for an undisclosed five-figure fee, later reported as a club record £75,000. The move reunited him with Aldershot manager Dean Holdsworth, who had previously managed Reid during his time at Newport County. He made his debut for the club on the opening day of the season, playing the whole match as Aldershot lost 7–6 on penalties to Wolverhampton Wanderers in the League Cup. Reid scored his first goal in his third appearance, in a 2–1 home defeat to Exeter City on 21 August 2012. He scored his first Football League hat-trick on 2 October 2012 in a 4–3 defeat to Torquay United at Plainmoor. He added a further three goals before the end of 2012, and opened the new year by scoring the winner from the penalty spot in a 1–0 victory away at Barnet, his tenth goal of the season. He ended the season with 12 goals from 45 appearances, as Aldershot were relegated to the Conference.

=== Southend United ===
Although Aldershot did not initially release Reid, his contract was cancelled by mutual consent, and, on 1 August 2013, he returned to League Two by signing a one-year contract with Southend United. Southend manager Phil Brown stated that he hoped Reid would replace the goals contributed by strikers Gavin Tomlin and Britt Assombalonga, both of whom had departed the club. Reid made his Southend debut two days after signing for the club, on 3 August 2013, coming on as a 68th-minute substitute in a 1–0 victory against Plymouth Argyle. All eight of Reid's appearances for Southend came in the opening three months of the season, six of which were as a substitute, and he did not feature for the club beyond October 2013.

=== Return to Stevenage ===
Reid's contract with Southend was terminated by mutual consent on 25 February 2014, and he returned to League One club Stevenage. The move reunited Reid with manager Graham Westley, who had signed the player for his first spell at the club three years earlier. He made one start and three substitute appearances without scoring, and was released at the end of the season.

=== Non-League ===
After leaving Stevenage, Reid signed a two-year deal with Conference Premier club Kidderminster Harriers on 15 May 2014. Reid made his debut for the club on the opening day of the 2014–15 season, playing the first 64 minutes of the club's 0–0 draw away at Lincoln City. He scored his first goal for Kidderminster on 6 September 2014, opening the scoring in a 2–1 victory against Gateshead at Aggborough. He scored five goals in 34 appearances during his first season, but, having failed to score in the opening months of the 2015–16 season, left the club by mutual consent at the end of the transfer window.

Reid linked up again with Dean Holdsworth, this time at Isthmian League Premier Division club Brentwood Town in October 2015, where he spent a brief spell before joining National League club Lincoln City. He was released after two appearances and subsequently signed for Gainsborough Trinity of the National League North in January 2016. Reid finished the season with Gainsborough, scoring three goals in 12 league matches, and was one of six players released by the club.

He signed for another National League North club, Gloucester City, on 6 June 2016. The club was managed by Tim Harris, who had been director of football at Newport County during Reid's time there. He made his debut for Gloucester in the club's first match of the 2016–17 season, playing 84 minutes in a 1–1 draw away to Salford City. He scored once during his time there, in a 2–2 away draw with AFC Fylde, making 16 appearances during the first half of the season.

=== Return to Newport County ===
Having trained with the club prior to the official agreement, Reid rejoined former club Newport County on 6 January 2017. He signed for the club on a short-term deal under manager Graham Westley, marking the third occasion on which Westley had signed him. A day later, he made his second debut for Newport as a second-half substitute in a 3–1 defeat to former club Stevenage. He subsequently started Newport's next nine League Two matches, although he did not feature again following Westley's dismissal in March 2017. Reid was released by Newport in May 2017, having made 10 appearances during his second spell with the club.

=== Return to Non-League ===
Following his release from Newport, Reid returned to his home city to join Midland Football League Premier Division club Coventry United. He scored 14 goals in 29 appearances for the club during the first half of the 2017–18 season, before signing for Northern Premier League Premier Division club Barwell on loan on 19 January 2018. Reid made his Barwell debut in the club's 2–0 away win against Workington the following day. He scored his only goal for the club in a 1–1 draw with Ashton United on 17 February 2018, and made nine appearances during his time there. He returned to Coventry United and finished the 2017–18 season playing in the club's first-team. Reid was not named in Coventry United's squad list ahead of the 2018–19 season, as he began to focus on earning his coaching badges.

== Style of play ==
Reid was deployed as a striker throughout his career. Manager Graham Westley described Reid as a "good quality technician". After signing Reid for a third time, Westley stated: "Pace was never his main attribute, which is why, four years on, I am comfortable that he can still play a role in what we do next".

== Coaching career ==
Reid obtained a UEFA B Licence in coaching. He served as the head coach of the University of Warwick men's football team and also worked as a personal coach specialising in striker development.

== Career statistics ==
Appearances and goals by club, season and competition
Club	Season	League			National Cup		League Cup		Other		Total	
Club	Season	Division	Apps	Goals	Apps	Goals	Apps	Goals	Apps	Goals	Apps	Goals
Coventry City	2005–06	Championship	0	0	0	0	0	0	0	0	0	0
Tamworth (loan)	2005–06	Conference National	2	0	—		—		—		2	0
Cheltenham Town	2006–07	League One	6	0	—		—		—		6	0
Cheltenham Town	2007–08	League One	8	0	2	0	1	0	1 (Note: Appearance(s) in Football League Trophy)	1	12	1
Cheltenham Town	Total		14	0	2	0	1	0	1	1	18	1
Grays Athletic	2008–09	Conference Premier	3	0			—				3	0
Newport County	2008–09	Conference South	27	16	2	1	—		4 (Note: Three appearances and three goals in FA Trophy; one appearance and one goal in Conference League Cup)	4	33	21
Newport County	2009–10	Conference South	40	24	2	2	—		4 (Note: Appearances in FA Trophy)	1	46	27
Newport County	2010–11	Conference Premier	29	18	1	0	—		3	0	33	18
Newport County	Total		96	58	5	3	0	0	11	5	112	66
Stevenage	2010–11	League Two	20	2	—		—		3 (Note: Appearances in 2011 League Two play-offs)	0	23	2
Stevenage	2011–12	League One	29	6	2	0	0	0	3 (Note: One appearance in Football League Trophy; two appearances in 2012 League One play-offs)	0	34	6
Stevenage	Total		49	8	2	0	0	0	6	0	57	8
Aldershot Town	2012–13	League Two	39	11	3	0	1	0	2	1	45	12
Southend United	2013–14	League Two	6	0	0	0	1	0	1	0	8	0
Stevenage	2013–14	League One	4	0	—		—		—		4	0
Kidderminster Harriers	2014–15	Conference Premier	31	4	1	0	—		2	1	34	5
Kidderminster Harriers	2015–16	National League	4	0	—		—		—		4	0
Kidderminster Harriers	Total		35	4	1	0	0	0	2	1	38	5
Brentwood Town	2015–16	Isthmian League Premier Division	3	0	3	2	—		3	2	9	4
Lincoln City	2015–16	National League	2	0	—		—		—		2	0
Gainsborough Trinity	2015–16	National League North	12	3	—		—		—		12	3
Gloucester City	2016–17	National League North	16	1	0	0	—		0	0	16	1
Newport County	2016–17	League Two	10	0	—		—		—		10	0
Coventry United	2017–18	Midland Football League	29	14	—		—		0	0	29	14
Barwell	2017–18	Northern Premier League Premier Division	9	1	—		—		0	0	9	1
Career totals			329	100	16	5	3	0	26	10	374	115

== Honours ==
Newport County

- Conference South: 2009–10

Stevenage

- Football League Two play-offs: 2011

Individual

- Conference South Player of the Year: 2009–10
