= Peter Winn (footballer) =

English footballer (born 1988)

Personal information
- Full name: Peter Harry Winn
- Date of birth: 19 December 1988 (age 37)
- Place of birth: Cleethorpes, England
- Height: 6 ft 0 in (1.83 m)
- Positions: Full-back; winger

Team information
- Current team: Barton Town

Youth career
- 2005–2006: Scunthorpe United

Senior career*
Years	Team	Apps	(Gls)
2006–2010	Scunthorpe United	4	(0)
2008–2009	→ Northwich Victoria (loan)	9	(1)
2009	→ Barrow (loan)	3	(0)
2009	→ Gateshead (loan)	6	(1)
2010	→ Gateshead (loan)	18	(3)
2010–2012	Stevenage	28	(2)
2011	→ Cambridge United (loan)	13	(1)
2012	→ Grimsby Town (loan)	10	(0)
2012–2014	Macclesfield Town	67	(0)
2014–2015	Chester	12	(1)
2015	→ King's Lynn Town (loan)	12	(2)
2015–2018	Cleethorpes Town		
2018–2019	Grimsby Borough	33	(4)
2019–2020	Barton Town	9	(0)
2021–2022	Nunsthorpe Tavern	31	(5)
2022–2023	Grimsby United	27	(4)
2023	Brigg Town	8	(2)
2023–2024	Barton Town	3	(0)
2024	Grimsby United	1	(0)
- * Club domestic league appearances and goals as of 19:13, 27 July 2025 (UTC)

Peter Harry Winn (born 19 December 1988) is an English former professional footballer. Primarily a winger earlier in his career, he was also deployed at full-back.

Winn began his career at Scunthorpe United, making his first-team debut as a 16-year-old scholar. He had loan spells at Northwich Victoria, Barrow, and Gateshead, the latter for the duration of the 2009–10 season. Released by Scunthorpe, he signed for League Two club Stevenage in May 2010, helping the team secure promotion to League One in his first season. He later spent time on loan at Cambridge United and Grimsby Town before leaving Stevenage in May 2012. Winn joined Macclesfield Town that summer, making 77 appearances across two years, and then played the 2014–15 season with Chester.

He returned to his hometown club, Cleethorpes Town in July 2015. During three years there, Winn won the Northern Counties East League Cup, Northern Counties East Premier Division title, and Lincolnshire Senior Trophy, as well as finishing FA Vase runner-up in May 2017. He moved to Grimsby Borough in July 2018, winning the Northern Counties East Division One title, and then joined Barton Town ahead of the 2019–20 season. Later in his career, Winn played in the Lincolnshire Football League with Nunsthorpe Tavern and Grimsby United, and also had short spells at Brigg Town and a brief return to Barton in November 2023.

== Playing career ==
=== Scunthorpe United ===
Winn began his career in the youth system at Scunthorpe United, and was named as the club's Young Player of the Year for the 2006–07 season. He initially played as a goalkeeper when he first joined the club's youth academy, before being utilised as a left winger from the age of 14 onwards. He made his debut for Scunthorpe at the age of 17 while a second-year scholar, starting in a 2–1 victory over Bradford City in the Football League Trophy in October 2006. The following season, Winn made four first-team appearances for the club, all of which came in the Championship. During the early stages of the 2008–09 season, Mansfield Town registered transfer interest in Winn, hoping to sign him on loan. No loan agreement with Mansfield materialised and, later that month, he joined Northwich Victoria on loan from October 2008 until January 2009. He played nine games and scored one goal in a 1–1 draw against Salisbury City on 21 November 2008. He had a trial at York City in February, playing in a reserve team game against Grimsby Town, although no transfer materialised. Winn joined Barrow on an emergency one-month loan in February 2009, where he played three times before returning to his parent club.

During the 2009–10 season, Winn signed for Conference Premier club Gateshead on a loan agreement on 16 October 2009. He scored on his debut in Gateshead's 1–0 victory against Salisbury City on 31 October 2009. In his second appearance for the club, he scored the equalising goal in an FA Cup tie against League One club Brentford, taking the game to a replay at Griffin Park. His loan spell initially ended in December 2009, but he rejoined Gateshead on loan until the end of the season in February 2010. His final goal for the club came in a 3–1 victory over Forest Green Rovers, as Gateshead narrowly avoided relegation. He played 27 times for the club during his two loan spells, scoring five times. Winn was subsequently released by Scunthorpe at the end of the 2009–10 season, and was offered a contract by Gateshead shortly thereafter.

=== Stevenage ===
Winn rejected Gateshead's contract offer and instead signed for League Two club Stevenage on a one-year deal on 27 May 2010. He had earlier written to manager Graham Westley requesting a trial with the club. Reflecting on the move, Winn stated he was pleased to have the opportunity to return to the Football League. He made his debut in Stevenage's 2–2 draw against Macclesfield Town on 7 August 2010, and scored his first goal in a 3–1 FA Cup win over Newcastle United on 8 January 2011. Winn described the goal, scored in injury time to secure the result, as the biggest moment of his career. His first league goal came later that month in a 3–0 victory against Rotherham United on 25 January 2011. Winn was sent off for the first time in his career against Southend United on 22 April 2011 following a challenge on Sean Clohessy. He returned to the squad for the play-off semi-final second leg against Accrington Stanley on 20 May 2011, appearing as an 89th-minute substitute in a 1–0 victory. Winn was an unused substitute in the 2011 Football League Two play-off final eight days later, as Stevenage defeated Torquay United 1–0 to earn promotion to League One. He made 33 appearances in all competitions during the 2010–11 season, scoring three goals.

At the start of the 2011–12 season, Winn was listed as Stevenage's substitute goalkeeper after Chris Day dislocated his finger during pre-season. He warmed up alongside Alan Julian before matches and served as the club's second-choice goalkeeper. Winn made one substitute appearance during the first six matches of the season, before joining Conference Premier club Cambridge United on a three-month loan. He later revealed that he had been close to joining Cambridge earlier that summer, though the move had not materialised at the time. Winn made his debut for the club in a 1–0 away win at Newport County on 3 September 2011, and went on to make 13 appearances, scoring once in a 2–0 home victory over Ebbsfleet United on 20 September 2011. He returned to Stevenage when his 93-day loan expired on 1 December 2011, with Cambridge manager Jez George indicating the club would consider a permanent transfer in the January 2012 transfer window. A permanent move did not follow, and in March 2012 Winn joined Grimsby Town, also of the Conference Premier, on loan until the end of the season. He made 10 appearances for Grimsby before leaving Stevenage when his contract expired in May 2012.

=== Macclesfield Town ===
A month after being released by Stevenage, Winn signed for Conference Premier club Macclesfield Town on a free transfer. He signed a two-year contract with the club. Winn made his debut for Macclesfield in the club's first match of the 2012–13 season, playing the full 90 minutes in a 2–1 away defeat to Hereford United. With Macclesfield trailing 1–0 in a home match against Luton Town on 19 February 2013, Winn was required to play 68 minutes as a goalkeeper after Rhys Taylor was sent off for fouling Luton striker Andre Gray. He kept a clean sheet during the remainder of the match, as Macclesfield came back to draw 1–1. Winn made 34 appearances for Macclesfield during his first season with the club. He remained at Macclesfield for the 2013–14 season, scoring his only goal in a 4–0 victory over League One club Swindon Town in the FA Cup on 9 November 2013. He made 41 appearances during the season.

=== Chester ===
Upon the expiry of his contract with Macclesfield, Winn signed for fellow Conference Premier club Chester on 25 June 2014. He made his Chester debut in the club's first match of the 2014–15 season, a 5–0 home defeat to Barnet on 9 August 2014. He scored his first goal for Chester three days later, a late consolation in a 2–1 loss to Forest Green Rovers. Having played 12 times for Chester during the first half of the season, limited by injury, Winn was loaned to Northern Premier League club King's Lynn Town in January 2015 on an initial one-month loan, which was later extended to three months. He made 12 appearances at King's Lynn, scoring twice, including once in a 3–1 victory against Trafford, a result that secured the club's survival in the Premier Division. He was recalled by Chester on 8 April 2015, and ended the season by coming on as a substitute in their final two league matches, both of which were victories. Winn left Chester at the end of the season, having made 15 appearances for the club.

=== Non-League ===
Winn signed for his hometown club, Cleethorpes Town of the Northern Counties East Premier Division, on 3 July 2015. He made 50 appearances in his first season with the club as they won the Northern Counties East League Cup. During the 2016–17 season, his second season with Cleethorpes, he played regularly and scored 12 goals as they won the Northern Counties East Premier Division title, amassing 108 points. The club won the Lincolnshire Senior Trophy during that season. Cleethorpes also reached the FA Vase final in the same season, losing 4–0 to South Shields in the final at Wembley Stadium on 21 May 2017, with Winn playing the full match.

He spent three years at Cleethorpes before joining Northern Counties East Division One club Grimsby Borough in July 2018. Winn made his Grimsby Borough debut in a 0–0 draw at home to Shirebrook Town on 4 August 2018, before scoring his first goal for the club four days later in a 10–0 victory against FC Bolsover. The club won the Division One title in Winn's first season, overtaking league leaders Campion by beating them 4–2 on the final day of the season. He made 33 appearances during the season, scoring four goals.

Winn signed for divisional rivals Barton Town on 5 July 2019. He made his Barton debut in the club's first victory of the 2019–20 season, playing the full match in a 3–2 FA Cup extra preliminary round win over Carlton Town on 10 August 2019. Winn played 12 times for Barton during the season. He later played in the Lincolnshire Football League for Nunsthorpe Tavern during the 2020–21 and 2021–22 seasons, scoring six goals in 36 appearances across the two seasons. Winn spent the 2022–23 season playing for Grimsby United, where he made 23 appearances and scored three times.

After scoring one goal in six appearances for Grimsby United at the start of the 2023–24 season, Winn joined Brigg Town of Northern Counties East Division One in September 2023 and scored twice in eight appearances during his time there. Winn left Brigg Town upon being appointed as assistant manager to Danny North at Barton Town on 14 November 2023, where he also made four first-team appearances. Winn departed the club at the end of the season.

== Style of play ==
Predominantly deployed as a winger throughout his career, Winn also adapted to playing as a full-back during his time with Cleethorpes Town and Grimsby Borough.

== Personal life ==
After retiring from professional football, Winn began working as a transport planner.

== Career statistics ==
Appearances and goals by club, season and competition
Club	Season	League			FA Cup		League Cup		Other		Total	
Club	Season	Division	Apps	Goals	Apps	Goals	Apps	Goals	Apps	Goals	Apps	Goals
Scunthorpe United	2006–07	League One	0	0	0	0	0	0	2 (Note: Appearance(s) in Football League Trophy)	0	2	0
Scunthorpe United	2007–08	Championship	4	0	0	0	0	0	0	0	4	0
Scunthorpe United	2008–09	League One	0	0	0	0	0	0	0	0	0	0
Scunthorpe United	2009–10	Championship	0	0	0	0	0	0	0	0	0	0
Scunthorpe United	Total		4	0	0	0	0	0	2	0	6	0
Northwich Victoria (loan)	2008–09	Conference Premier	9	1	0	0	—		0	0	9	1
Barrow (loan)	2008–09	Conference Premier	3	0	0	0	—		0	0	3	0
Gateshead (loan)	2009–10	Conference Premier	24	4	2	1	—		0	0	26	5
Stevenage	2010–11	League Two	28	2	2	1	1	0	2 (Note: One appearance in Football League Trophy; one appearance in 2011 League Two play-offs)	0	33	3
Stevenage	2011–12	League One	0	0	0	0	1	0	0	0	1	0
Stevenage	Total		28	2	2	1	2	0	2	0	34	3
Cambridge United (loan)	2011–12	Conference Premier	13	1	0	0	—		0	0	13	1
Grimsby Town (loan)	2011–12	Conference Premier	10	0	0	0	—		0	0	10	0
Macclesfield Town	2012–13	Conference Premier	30	0	4	0	—		1 (Note: Appearance(s) in FA Trophy)	0	35	0
Macclesfield Town	2013–14	Conference Premier	37	0	5	1	—		0	0	42	1
Macclesfield Town	Total		67	0	9	1	0	0	1	0	77	1
Chester	2014–15	Conference Premier	12	1	2	0	—		1	0	15	1
King's Lynn Town (loan)	2014–15	NPL Premier Division	12	2	0	0	—		0	0	12	2
Cleethorpes Town	2015–16	NCEL Premier Division	38	3	2	1	—		10	0	50	4
Cleethorpes Town	2016–17	NCEL Premier Division	Season statistics incomplete									
Cleethorpes Town	2017–18	NPL Division One South	Season statistics incomplete									
Grimsby Borough	2018–19	NCEL Division One	33	4	0	0	—		0	0	33	4
Barton Town	2019–20	NCEL Premier Division	9	0	1	0	—		2 (Note: One appearance in NCEL League Cup; one appearance in Lincolnshire Senior Trophy)	0	12	0
Nunsthorpe Tarvern	2020–21	Lincolnshire FL Premier Division	8	2	—		—		0	0	8	2
Nunsthorpe Tarvern	2021–22	Lincolnshire FL Premier Division	23	3	—		—		5 (Note: One appearance in Supplementary Cup; two appearances in Lincolnshire Junior Cup; two appearances and one goal in Lincolnshire Challenge Cup)	1	28	4
Nunsthorpe Tarvern	Total		31	5	0	0	0	0	5	1	36	6
Grimsby United	2022–23	Lincolnshire FL Premier Division	21	3	—		—		2 (Note: One appearance in Supplementary Cup; one appearance in Lincolnshire Challenge Cup)	0	23	3
Grimsby United	2023–24	Lincolnshire FL Premier Division	6	1	—		—		0	0	6	1
Grimsby United	Total		27	4	0	0	0	0	2	0	29	4
Brigg Town	2023–24	NCEL Division One	8	2	0	0	—		0	0	8	2
Barton Town	2023–24	NCEL Premier Division	3	0	0	0	—		1 (Note: Appearance in Lincolnshire Senior Trophy)	0	4	0
Grimsby United	2024–25	Lincolnshire FL Division One	1	0	—		—		0	0	1	0
Career totals			332	29	18	5	2	0	26	1	378	35

== Honours ==
Stevenage

- Football League Two play-offs: 2011

Cleethorpes Town

- Northern Counties East League Cup: 2015–16
- Northern Counties East Premier Division: 2016–17
- Lincolnshire Senior Trophy: 2016–17
- FA Vase runner-up: 2016–17

Grimsby Borough

- Northern Counties East Division One: 2018–19
- Lincolnshire Senior Trophy runner-up: 2018–19
