= 2010–11 Stevenage F.C. season =

Stevenage
2010–11 season
- Chairman: Phil Wallace
- Manager: Graham Westley
- League Two: 6th
- Play-offs: Winners (promoted)
- FA Cup: Fourth round
- League Cup: First round
- League Trophy: First round
- Top goalscorer: League: Byron Harrison (8); All: Byron Harrison; John Mousinho (8)
- Highest home attendance: 6,644 v Newcastle United, FA Cup, 8 January 2011
- Lowest home attendance: 1,549 v Rotherham United, League Two, 25 January 2011

The 2010–11 season was Stevenage F.C.'s first season in the Football League, where the club competed in League Two. This article shows statistics of the club's players in the season, and also lists all matches that the club played during the season. Their first-place finish and subsequent promotion means it will be their first ever season of playing in the Football League, having featured in the Conference National for the past sixteen years. The season also marked the first season that the club played under its new name – Stevenage Football Club, dropping 'Borough' from its title as of 1 June 2010. It was the third year in charge for manager Graham Westley during his second spell at the club; having previously managed the Hertfordshire side from 2003 to 2006.

Ahead of the club's first season in the Football League, Westley stated a desire to give the majority of the squad that had won promotion from the Conference National a chance to play in League Two. This subsequently meant there was a similar level of transfer activity to the club's 2009–10 campaign. Three players left the club ahead of the 2010–11 season. Andy Drury decided to leave Stevenage in favour of a move back into non-league, joining Luton Town on a free transfer, while both Mark Albrighton and Eddie Odhiambo were released in June 2010. Five players joined the club during the close season. Darius Charles was the first signing of the season, joining Stevenage from Ebbsfleet United for a fee set by a tribunal. Wingers Peter Winn and Rob Sinclair signed on free transfers from Scunthorpe United and Salisbury City respectively, while defender Luke Foster joined the club after being released by Mansfield Town. Stevenage also announced the signing of midfielder John Mousinho in late June 2010, who rejected a contract extension at Wycombe Wanderers in order to sign for the club. In terms of transfers during the 2010–11 campaign, strikers Lee Boylan, Tim Sills and Peter Vincenti were all allowed to find new clubs in January 2011, while both Marvin Williams and Taiwo Atieno had brief spells with the club. Three strikers joined the club during the season, Ben May and Byron Harrison signed for the club on free transfers, whilst Craig Reid joined from Newport County for what was a "club record fee" in January 2011.

Stevenage recorded just one league win from their first seven league fixtures, and suffered from inconsistency for the first half of the league campaign. Following four defeats in six games in December 2010 and January 2011, Stevenage found themselves in 18th position, just four points above the relegation zone. However, during a congested period throughout February and March 2011, Stevenage won nine games out of eleven, propelling the club up the league table and into the play-off positions. This included winning six games on the trot, a sequence only matched by Bury. A 3–3 draw on the last day of the season against Bury confirmed Stevenage's place in the play-offs, finishing sixth with 69 points. This meant that they faced fifth placed Accrington Stanley over two legs in the play-off semi-finals, winning both legs and securing an aggregate 3–0 win. They beat Torquay United 1–0 in the final, held at Old Trafford, thanks to a goal from John Mousinho just before half-time. The win meant that Stevenage would play in League One, the third tier of English football, during the 2011–12 season for the first time in their history.

The 2010–11 season also witnessed Stevenage compete in both the League Cup and Football League Trophy for the first time in their history as a league side, falling to home defeats in the first round of both competitions to Portsmouth and Brentford respectively. Stevenage also reached the fourth round of the FA Cup, only the second time the club had reached this stage. The cup run included beating League One side Milton Keynes Dons on penalties, as well as beating AFC Wimbledon live on ITV. Stevenage were drawn against Premier League side Newcastle United, a tie which resulted in many recalling the previous meetings between the two clubs in 1998. The tie ended 3–1 in Stevenage's favour, becoming only the third team in the fourth tier of English football to beat a Premier League side since its formation. Stevenage eventually lost in the following round 2–1 to Championship side Reading.

Byron Harrison, who joined the club in January 2011, and John Mousinho, finished as joint top goalscorers for the season with eight goals each. Goalkeeper Chris Day played every minute of every one of Stevenage's 56 games during the season. Jon Ashton won all three end of the season awards, including Player of the Year.

== Squad details ==
Last updated on 29 May 2011. The squad at the end of the season.

=== Players information ===
No.	Name	Nationality	Position	Date of birth (Age)	Signed from	Notes
Goalkeepers
1	Ashley Bayes	(England)	GK	19 April 1972 (age 54)	Crawley Town	
16	Chris Day	(England)	GK	28 July 1975 (age 51)	Millwall	
29	Joe Welch	(England)	GK	10 September 1988 (age 38)	Histon (loan)	
Defenders
3	Scott Laird	(England)	LB	15 May 1988 (age 38)	Plymouth Argyle	
4	Darius Charles	(England)	CB	10 December 1987 (age 38)	Ebbsfleet United	
5	Jon Ashton	(England)	CB	4 October 1982 (age 44)	Grays Athletic	
6	Luke Foster	(England)	CB	8 September 1985 (age 41)	Mansfield Town	
14	Mark Roberts (c)	(England)	CB	16 October 1983 (age 42)	Northwich Victoria	
25	Ronnie Henry	(England)	RB	20 January 1984 (age 42)	Dublin City	
Midfielders
2	Lawrie Wilson	(England)	RM	11 September 1987 (age 39)	Colchester United	
7	Darren Murphy	(Republic of Ireland)	CM	28 July 1985 (age 41)	Cork City	
8	Stacy Long	(England)	CM	11 January 1985 (age 41)	Ebbsfleet United	
13	Joel Byrom	(England)	CM	14 September 1986 (age 40)	Northwich Victoria	
17	Peter Winn	(England)	LM	19 December 1988 (age 37)	Scunthorpe United	
18	David Bridges	(England)	CM	22 September 1982 (age 44)	Kettering Town	
21	John Mousinho	(England)	CM	30 April 1986 (age 40)	Wycombe Wanderers	
23	Rob Sinclair	(England)	RM	29 August 1989 (age 37)	Salisbury City	
24	Michael Bostwick	(England)	CM	17 May 1988 (age 38)	Ebbsfleet United	
Forwards
10	Craig Reid	(England)	FW	17 December 1985 (age 40)	Newport County	
11	Yemi Odubade	(Nigeria)	FW	4 July 1984 (age 42)	Oxford United	
12	Ben May	(England)	FW	10 March 1984 (age 42)	Scunthorpe United	
20	Chris Beardsley	(England)	FW	28 February 1984 (age 42)	Kettering Town	
26	Byron Harrison	(England)	FW	15 June 1987 (age 39)	Carshalton Athletic	

=== Management ===
- Manager: Graham Westley
- Assistant manager: John Dreyer
- First team coach: Dino Maamria
- Goalkeeping coach: Ali Uzunhasanoglu
- Fitness coach: Neil Withington
- Physiotherapist: Paul Dando

== Match results ==
=== Legend ===
Win	Draw	Loss

=== Pre-season ===
In June 2010, Stevenage announced that their pre–season campaign would consist of eight friendlies to open the 2010–11 season. Stevenage's proposed friendly against Peterborough United on 27 July was cancelled and was subsequently replaced with a home fixture against local Championship side Watford. Stevenage were due to face Dover Athletic in late July, but the friendly was cancelled at the request of Dover. The first-team squad reported back for pre–season training on 27 June. Stevenage played League One side Yeovil Town in a "behind closed doors" match on 13 July in a fixture "played away from the club's Broadhall Way base". Stevenage won the match 1–0 courtesy of an 82nd-minute strike from Tim Sills. The following day, Stevenage beat Conference National outfit Histon 2–0 at Bridge Road, with goals in either half from Yemi Odubade and Scott Laird. Trialists Chris Dickson, Warren McBean, and Omer Riza also featured in the match. Two days later, Stevenage travelled to Conference South side Chelmsford City for their third pre–season fixture; with the game ending 1–1. Chelmsford took the lead early in the second–half, before Charlie Griffin equalised for the visitors with ten minutes remaining. Both Dickson and McBean trialled once more, while another trialist, John Grant, also played 45 minutes of the match. Stevenage's fourth pre–season fixture against Championship side Norwich City ended in a 0–0 draw, with Scott Laird missing a penalty in the second half for the hosts. Striker Bas Savage also trialled for Stevenage, coming on as a 50th-minute substitute in the match. Stevenage then entertained another Championship side in the form of newly promoted Millwall, with Stevenage winning the match 2–1. Former Millwall player Peter Vincenti opened the scoring in the first-half, and the lead was doubled early on in the second-half courtesy of new signing Peter Winn. Millwall pulled a goal back with ten minutes remaining through former Stevenage striker Steve Morison. Three days later, Stevenage lost 2–0 to Watford at Broadhall Way, the club's first defeat of the pre–season campaign. The following day, Stevenage beat Corby Town 1–0, with Chris Beardsley's first-half strike proving to be the decider. After the match, it was announced that Stevenage would add another friendly to their schedule, playing local side Hitchin Town on 2 August. In the club's penultimate game of the pre–season campaign, Stevenage lost 1–0 to Conference National side Newport County at Spytty Park. Stevenage won their final pre–season fixture 4–0 against Hitchin Town. Charlie Griffin, Mark Roberts, and Michael Bostwick gave Stevenage a three-goal lead going into the interval, and Chris Beardsley added a fourth in the second half to complete the scoring.

Game	Date	Opponent	Venue	Result	Attendance	Goalscorers	Notes
1	13 July 2010	Yeovil Town	Neutral	1–0	—	Sills	
2	14 July 2010	Histon	Away	2–0	295	Odubade, Laird (pen)	
3	16 July 2010	Chelmsford City	Away	1–1	306	Griffin	
4	20 July 2010	Norwich City	Home	0–0	1,024		
5	24 July 2010	Millwall	Home	2–1	1,164	Vincenti, Winn	
6	27 July 2010	Watford	Home	0–2	1,215		
7	28 July 2010	Corby Town	Away	1–0	195	Beardsley	
8	31 July 2010	Newport County	Away	0–1	837		
9	2 August 2010	Hitchin Town	Away	4–0	401	Griffin, Roberts, Bostwick, Beardsley	

- Note: Stevenage goals come first.

=== League Two ===
The 2010–11 League Two fixtures were released on 17 June 2010, with Stevenage opening their league campaign at home to Macclesfield Town on 7 August 2010. The game ended 2–2. Peter Vincenti opened the scoring for the hosts after just six minutes; heading in Charlie Griffin's looping cross. Macclesfield equalised just four minutes later after Matt Hamshaw's cross was headed in by Nat Brown. Tyrone Barnett then put the away side ahead early in the second–half. Stevenage levelled the game with just one minute remaining after Rob Sinclair cut in from the right and slid the ball to Charlie Griffin, who poked the ball past the on–rushing Veiga. The club's first away game in the Football League ended in a 1–0 defeat against Bradford City at Valley Parade. Bradford striker Gareth Evans scored the only goal of the game from the penalty spot in the first–half in a game that was "rough luck on the visitors" having dominated large parts of the game. Stevenage won their first game of the season a week later, beating Stockport County 3–1 at Broadhall Way. Charlie Griffin opened the scoring with a looping header after half an hour, before Michael Bostwick's 30-yard effort found the top corner two minutes before the interval. Griffin added the third with a close range effort in the second-half, with Stockport's George Donnelly scoring a consolation goal in injury–time. A week later, Stevenage travelled to Aldershot Town for their second away fixture of the season. The game ended all square, finishing 1–1. Chris Beardsley opened the scoring five minutes into the second-half, with Aldershot striker Damian Spencer equalising fifteen minutes later. With just five minutes remaining, Jon Ashton was adjudged to have fouled Spencer in the area, with referee Mark Halsey pointing to the spot. Marvin Morgan's resulting penalty was palmed away by Chris Day to ensure Stevenage earned their first point on the road.

Stevenage hosted Crewe Alexandra in the first weekend of September, which resulted in a 1–1 draw. Crewe were forced to wear Stevenage's yellow away strip after the referee deemed their current away kit to clash with the red and white of Stevenage. Stevenage took the lead just before the interval, Yemi Odubade tapping the ball into the net after Stacy Long's initial shot had rebounded off of the post. Crewe equalised ten minutes into the second-half, Ashley Westwood scoring from just outside the area. The home side were reduced to ten men just minutes later as Long was sent-off for two bookable offences. A week later, Stevenage lost their second league game of the season, losing 1–0 to Cheltenham Town at Whaddon Road. The following game, Stevenage drew 0–0 at home to Torquay United – who had sat at the top of the table before the start of the match. Stevenage won their first away game of the season against Lincoln City, winning 1–0 at Sincil Bank. New loan signing Chris Holroyd scored the only goal of the game just before half-time, lashing the ball high into the roof of the net after Charlie Griffin had brought down Darius Charles' throw-in. First-team coach Dino Maamria was also listed as a substitute, but was unused. Three days later, Stevenage recorded their second away win of the campaign, beating Hereford United 4–1. Stevenage opened the scoring after thirteen minutes, Chris Holroyd latching onto Lawrie Wilson's cross to give the visitors a one-goal lead going into the interval. However, just four minutes into the second-half Hereford restored parity through Sean Canham. On the hour mark, the away side led once again, Jon Ashton heading home Wilson's corner to score his first goal of the season. Stevenage doubled their advantage just seven minutes later, Chris Holroyd scoring from six yards out. Holroyd completed his hat-trick with ten minutes remaining; Peter Vincenti broke down the right, squared the ball to Holroyd who composed himself before scoring his fourth goal in two games.

Following two successive away victories, Stevenage hosted Wycombe Wanderers at the beginning of October. The game ended 2–0 to Wycombe, both of the visitors goals coming in the first-half. Stevenage drew 1–1 with Rotherham United a week later at the Don Valley Stadium. Rotherham took the lead against the run of the play just before half-time, Nicky Law finding the net on the counterattack. After the interval, Stevenage pressed for an equaliser, and restored parity with just eight minutes left; John Mousinho scoring his first goal for the club after David Bridges had seen his initial shot saved. A week later, Stevenage entertained Burton Albion at Broadhall Way, with the score ending 2–1 to the hosts, Stevenage's first home win since August. Stevenage had the chance to take the lead early on after referee Trevor Kettle decided that Chris Holroyd had been pushed in the area by Burton defender Nathan Stanton. Holroyd subsequently missed the resulting penalty kick. Stevenage were awarded another penalty ten minutes before the interval, this time Lawrie Wilson was the player to be fouled. Regular penalty taker Scott Laird stepped up and scored the resulting spot-kick. Shortly after the interval, Burton equalised; long-serving Aaron Webster arriving late into the box to finish neatly and restore parity. Ten minutes later, the home side were in front once again, Holroyd making amends for his penalty miss by scoring on the half-volley following good work down the right wing by Wilson. Substitute Luke Foster was sent-off with twenty minutes left, but Stevenage held on to take the three points. Stevenage then travelled to the Globe Arena to face Morecambe, a game that ended 0–0. Scott Laird saw his penalty saved for the visitors five minutes into the second half after Garry Hunter had handballed in the area. The Hertfordshire side then welcomed league leaders Chesterfield to Broadhall Way for the club's last game of October. The game ended 0–0, Stevenage's second consecutive goalless draw.

Stevenage made the short journey to Hertfordshire rivals Barnet in early November. Stevenage won the match 3–0, their third away win of the season. John Mousinho opened the scoring after half an hour, hitting a "rasping shot" that found the bottom corner of the goal. The lead was doubled just six minutes later, Mark Roberts sliding in from close range after Michael Bostwick had headed the ball across goal. Mousinho added a third from the penalty spot with ten minutes remaining. Stevenage stretched their unbeaten run to seven games after a 1–1 home draw with Shrewsbury Town. Chris Holroyd scored after just eight minutes, tapping in from close range after Michael Bostwick's free-kick had been spilled. Shrewsbury equalised ten minutes into the second half through striker Matt Harrold. The following week, Stevenage lost 1–0 to Accrington Stanley at the Crown Ground, with Accrington scoring with twenty minutes remaining. Three days later, Stevenage welcomed Southend United to Broadhall Way, with the game ending 1–1. Stevenage took the lead after twenty five minutes through Stacy Long, who turned in Michael Bostwick's wayward shot. Southend levelled with just five minutes remaining, when substitute Barry Corr worked his way into the box and finished calmly.

Stevenage's first scheduled game of December was an away trip to Port Vale. However, the game was called off on 2 December, two days before the match, because of adverse weather conditions. Stevenage returned to action a week later, losing 1–0 at home to Northampton Town, with Ryan Gilligan's fourteenth-minute strike settling the match. Darius Charles, a second-half substitute, was sent-off just seven minutes into the second-half. Stevenage's trip to Bury, scheduled to be played on 18 December, was called off a day before the match due to a frozen pitch at Gigg Lane. The club's home game with Oxford United on 26 December also fell foul of the adverse weather conditions, with the game being postponed due to a frozen pitch following a 10.30am pitch inspection on the day of the match. A day later, Stevenage's game against Burton Albion was also postponed following a failed pitch inspection at the Pirelli Stadium. The spate of postponements meant that Stevenage had only played one game in six weeks, as well as having to train on 3G surfaces in the local area.

Stevenage returned to action on 1 January, losing 1–0 to Gillingham at Priestfield courtesy of a first-half strike from Adebayo Akinfenwa. Just hours before the match, Stevenage announced the signing of Byron Harrison from Carshalton Athletic. Harrison started the match, playing 61 minutes before being substituted. Just two days later, Stevenage entertained Barnet at Broadhall Way. Former Stevenage manager Paul Fairclough took caretaker charge of the Barnet side for the game. The game ended 4–2 in Stevenage's favour. The hosts were 2–0 up after just eight minutes, thanks to a Luke Foster strike and a Grant Basey own goal. Stevenage's third came just before the half-hour mark, Chris Beardsley and Rob Sinclair exchanged passes, before Sinclair sent a looping cross into the box that was met on the volley by the arriving Stacy Long. Captain Mark Roberts added a fourth shortly after the interval, his second goal of the season – his first also coming against Barnet. Barnet added two consolation goals in the space of three second-half minutes through Izale McLeod and Mark Marshall. The win meant that Stevenage had secured their first three points since early November. Stevenage then fell to another away defeat, this time losing 1–0 at Chesterfield at the B2net Stadium, with Chesterfield scoring just before the interval. A week later, Stevenage secured their second consecutive home victory with a 2–0 win against Morecambe at Broadhall Way. Both of the goals came in the first ten minutes of the match – Scott Laird scored the first goal, turning John Mousinho's cross into the net after just five minutes. Four minutes later, Laird's cross was sliced into the net by Morecambe defender Kieran Charnock. Stevenage then followed this up with another home victory three days later, this time winning 3–0 against Rotherham United. Peter Winn opened the scoring just before the interval, cutting inside from the right wing and lashing a shot that beat Rotherham goalkeeper Andy Warrington at his near post. Substitute Byron Harrison scored his first goal for the club just three minutes after coming off the bench, scoring from close range after Rob Sinclair's right wing cross. Scott Laird then added a third in injury-time, collecting Lawrie Wilson's pass and curling the ball into the top right hand corner of the goal.

February began with Stevenage playing their third consecutive home league game, entertaining Gillingham at Broadhall Way, with the game ending 2–2. Stevenage opened the scoring midway through the first-half, Byron Harrison, starting only his second game for the club, heading in Lawrie Wilson's deep cross. Gillingham equalised in first-half injury time, Cody McDonald scoring from close range. The visitors took the lead just after the interval, Adebayo Akinfenwa, who also scored for Gillingham in the reverse fixture, scored from six yards out following good work by Joe Martin. Stevenage manager Graham Westley made two second-half changes, bringing on Ben May and Peter Winn, the latter supplying the cross for Harrison to score his second with fifteen minutes remaining to restore parity. Another 2–2 draw followed three days later, this time against Accrington Stanley. Stevenage had a two-goal lead courtesy of strikes from Byron Harrison and Lawrie Wilson, but two late Accrington goals meant that the points were shared. Three days after the draw with Accrington, Stevenage travelled to Gigg Lane for their first ever game against Bury. The game ended 3–0 to Bury, courtesy of goals from Andy Bishop, ex-Stevenage defender Efe Sodje, and Ryan Lowe. Stevenage fell to their fifth consecutive away defeat just four days later, losing 1–0 at Shrewsbury Town courtesy of a first-half Nicky Wroe strike. The club made it five league games without victory on 15 February, drawing 0–0 at home to Oxford United. Four days after the stalemate with Oxford, Stevenage secured their first away win in four months, winning 1–0 at Crewe Alexandra courtesy of an 87th-minute goal from Byron Harrison – Stevenage's first away goal in the league since 2 November 2010. This was followed up with another away win three days later, this time securing three points against Port Vale at Vale Park, winning the match 3–1. Stevenage took the lead fifteen minutes before the interval when Anthony Griffith's 30-yard backpass took a bobble and rolled over Port Vale goalkeeper Chris Martin's foot. The visitors doubled their lead seven minutes later when Peter Winn scored a low drilled effort. Port Vale got a goal back through Sam Morsy, but David Bridges restored Stevenage's two-goal lead after Byron Harrison's cross had ricocheted off the goalkeeper and fell to the feet of Bridges. Stevenage's last game of February was a home game against Cheltenham Town, with Stevenage securing their third consecutive league victory, winning the game 4–0. Goals from Mark Roberts and Byron Harrison had given Stevenage a two-goal lead going into half-time. Michael Bostwick added a third in the 52nd minute, lashing the ball across goal from just inside the area after a tidy interchange with Byron Harrison. Two minutes later, Harrison then added his second of the game, and Stevenage's fourth, when he headed in Lawrie Wilson's right wing cross.

Two second-half Torquay United goals ended Stevenage's four match unbeaten run, with the game ending 2–0 to the home side. Torquay substitute Danny Stevens gave the home side the lead just a minute after half-time. Stevenage captain Mark Roberts was given a straight red card with twenty minutes remaining for bringing down Chris Zebroski in the area, with the latter missing the subsequent penalty. Torquay doubled their lead with five minutes remaining through Jake Robinson. This was followed up with another defeat three days later, this time a 1–0 loss to Hereford United at Broadhall Way. Four days later, on 12 March, Stevenage beat Wycombe Wanderers 1–0 at Adams Park. John Mousinho scored the only goal of the game just after half-time, scoring against his former club with a goal from 30 yards out. Stevenage had to play with ten men for the last thirty minutes of the match after Scott Laird was sent-off for two bookable offences. Another away victory followed three days later as Stevenage beat Oxford United 2–1 at the Kassam Stadium. Stevenage took the lead midway through the first half when Harry Worley deflected Darius Charles' header into his own goal. Oxford equalised in first-half injury-time, Tom Craddock scoring from the penalty spot after Peter Winn was adjudged to have fouled Josh Payne in the area. Just three minutes after half-time, Stevenage striker Craig Reid scored his first goal for the club after good work from Rob Sinclair – the goal gave the visitors their fifth win in their last seven outings. Stevenage secured their third consecutive victory with a 2–1 home win against Lincoln City on 19 March 2011. Lincoln striker Ashley Grimes scored from the penalty spot after Scott Laird had handled in the area. The home side equalised four minutes later, John Mousinho's shot was saved by Lincoln goalkeeper Trevor Carson, but Lawrie Wilson was on hand to score the rebound. Wilson doubled his goal tally for the day on the hour mark, lashing a shot past Carson from 25 yards after a neat interchange with Mousinho. A fourth straight win followed three days later, with two John Mousinho goals securing a 2–0 victory against Burton Albion at the Pirelli Stadium. Stevenage secured their fifth straight victory four days later, comprehensively beating Macclesfield Town 4–0 at Moss Rose. The away side took the lead on the half-hour mark, captain Mark Roberts scoring from close range after Darius Charles' shot was driven across the face of goal. Rob Sinclair doubled Stevenage's lead five minutes later, scoring his first goal for the club. Roberts was on hand to head home his second of the game just after the interval, and Sinclair made it four following good work from Charles.

A sixth straight win followed on 2 April 2011, when Stevenage beat Bradford City 2–1 at Broadhall Way. The home side took the lead with ten minutes remaining of the first-half, Stacy Long was fouled in the area and referee Brendan Malone pointed to the spot. John Mousinho stepped up to score the penalty, his seventh goal of the season. Bradford equalised with just twenty minutes remaining – the Stevenage defence failed to deal with a ball into the area, and Bradford midfielder Dave Syers was on hand to poke the ball into the net. Stevenage responded within five minutes, Mousinho fed Craig Reid down the left, who squared the ball to Darius Charles, who subsequently drilled the ball low past goalkeeper Jon McLaughlin to give Stevenage all three points. Stevenage drew their following game 2–2 at Stockport County. The away side took the lead ten minutes after half-time through Mark Roberts. However, two quick-fire Stockport goals within the space of three second-half minutes gave Stockport the lead. Lawrie Wilson popped up in injury-time to secure Stevenage a point. Another 2–2 draw followed, this time at home to Aldershot Town. Stevenage took the lead after ten minutes, Darius Charles scoring from John Mousinho's lofted free-kick. Aldershot equalised just before half-time, Alex Rodman lashing the ball home after Stevenage had failed to clear the ball. Rodman scored again just after the break, cutting in from the left channel and scoring from just outside the area. The home side restored parity for twenty minutes remaining; Mousinho's corner arrived to Luke Foster at the back post, who rifled his shot through a body of players to earn Stevenage a valuable point. Stevenage's eight game unbeaten run ended on 22 April 2011, following a 1–0 defeat to Southend United at Roots Hall. Stevenage were reduced to ten men in the first-half, after Peter Winn was dismissed for a challenge on Sean Clohessy. The visitors were awarded a second-half penalty after Southend defender Bilel Mohsni fouled Byron Harrison, but John Mousinho's subsequent penalty was saved. Barry Corr scored what proved to be the winner ten minutes from time. Stevenage recorded a win just three days later, beating play-off rivals Port Vale 1–0 at Broadhall Way thanks to a goal from Lawrie Wilson with twenty minutes remaining. The club fell to their second successive away defeat on 30 April, losing 2–0 at Northampton Town at Sixfields Stadium. Both Luke Foster and John Mousinho were sent-off for Stevenage.

Stevenage faced Bury at Broadhall Way on 7 May 2011, ending in a 3–3 draw, a result that ultimately meant Stevenage finished sixth and subsequently earned a place in the play-offs. Stevenage took the lead after eight minutes, Scott Laird lashing a shot from outside that area that beat Bury goalkeeper Cameron Belford. Bury were level just seven minutes later, Steven Schumacher's tame effort crept past Chris Day's outstretched arm. Three minutes later, Stevenage were back in front once more – Craig Reid scoring from the penalty spot after Byron Harrison had been fouled in the area by Belford. Bury restored parity for the second time in the game on the half-hour mark; on loan striker Nicky Ajose stooping low to head in Mike Jones low cross. Bury took the lead for the first time in the game with just twenty minutes remaining, Schumacher scoring his second goal of the game with a strike from 35 yards. However, three minutes later, the game was level again, Ben May poking in his first goal for the club after the Bury defence had failed to deal with Rob Sinclair's cross.

Game	Date	Opponent	Venue	Result	Attendance	Goalscorers	Notes
1	7 August 2010	Macclesfield Town	Home	2–2	3,533	Vincenti, Griffin	
2	14 August 2010	Bradford City	Away	0–1	10,967		
3	21 August 2010	Stockport County	Home	3–1	2,726	Griffin (2), Bostwick	
4	28 August 2010	Aldershot Town	Away	1–1	2,525	Beardsley	
5	4 September 2010	Crewe Alexandra	Home	1–1	3,181	Odubade	
6	11 September 2010	Cheltenham Town	Away	0–1	2,805		
7	18 September 2010	Torquay United	Home	0–0	3,049		
8	25 September 2010	Lincoln City	Away	1–0	3,215	Holroyd	
9	28 September 2010	Hereford United	Away	4–1	1,444	Holroyd (3), Ashton	
10	2 October 2010	Wycombe Wanderers	Home	0–2	3,384		
11	9 October 2010	Rotherham United	Away	1–1	4,037	Mousinho	
12	16 October 2010	Burton Albion	Home	2–1	2,550	Laird (pen), Holroyd	
13	23 October 2010	Morecambe	Away	0–0	2,254		
14	30 October 2010	Chesterfield	Home	0–0	3,556		
15	2 November 2010	Barnet	Away	3–0	2,722	Mousinho (2), Roberts	
16	13 November 2010	Shrewsbury Town	Home	1–1	2,765	Holroyd	
17	20 November 2010	Accrington Stanley	Away	0–1	1,370		
18	23 November 2010	Southend United	Home	1–1	2,544	Long	
19	11 December 2010	Northampton Town	Home	0–1	3,128		
20	1 January 2011	Gillingham	Away	0–1	5,429		
21	3 January 2011	Barnet	Home	4–2	3,744	Foster, Basey (o.g), Long, Roberts	
22	15 January 2011	Chesterfield	Away	0–1	6,219		
23	22 January 2011	Morecambe	Home	2–0	2,002	Laird, Charnock (o.g)	
24	25 January 2011	Rotherham United	Home	3–0	1,549	Winn, Harrison, Laird	
25	1 February 2011	Gillingham	Home	2–2	2,424	Harrison (2)	
26	5 February 2011	Accrington Stanley	Home	2–2	2,265	Harrison, Wilson	
27	8 February 2011	Bury	Away	0–3	2,080		
28	12 February 2011	Shrewsbury Town	Away	0–1	5,261		
29	15 February 2011	Oxford United	Home	0–0	2,590		
30	19 February 2011	Crewe Alexandra	Away	1–0	3,793	Harrison	
31	22 February 2011	Port Vale	Away	3–1	4,588	Griffith (o.g), Winn, Bridges	
32	26 February 2011	Cheltenham Town	Home	4–0	2,733	Roberts, Harrison (2), Bostwick	
33	5 March 2011	Torquay United	Away	0–2	2,197		
34	8 March 2011	Hereford United	Home	0–1	1,670		
35	12 March 2011	Wycombe Wanderers	Away	1–0	4,453	Mousinho	
36	15 March 2011	Oxford United	Away	2–1	6,018	Worley (o.g), Reid	
37	19 March 2011	Lincoln City	Home	2–1	2,732	Wilson (2)	
38	22 March 2011	Burton Albion	Away	2–0	1,962	Mousinho (2)	
39	26 March 2011	Macclesfield Town	Away	4–0	1,346	Roberts (2), Sinclair (2)	
40	2 April 2011	Bradford City	Home	2–1	3,079	Mousinho (pen), Charles	
41	9 April 2011	Stockport County	Away	2–2	3,449	Roberts, Wilson	
42	16 April 2011	Aldershot Town	Home	2–2	3,031	Charles, Harrison	
43	22 April 2011	Southend United	Away	0–1	6,622		
44	25 April 2011	Port Vale	Home	1–0	3,146	Wilson	
45	30 April 2011	Northampton Town	Away	0–2	6,257		
46	7 May 2011	Bury	Home	3–3	5,016	Laird, Reid (pen), May	

- Note: Stevenage goals come first.

=== League Two play-offs ===
As a result of Stevenage's sixth-place finish, they faced fifth placed Accrington Stanley over two legs in the League Two play-off semi-finals. The first leg was played on 15 May 2011, at Broadhall Way, televised live on Sky Sports. Stevenage won the match 2–0, courtesy of Stacy Long's deflected effort and Joel Byrom's toe-poke past the onrushing Alex Cisak, both of which came in the first half of the game. This subsequently meant Stevenage took a two-goal lead into the second leg, which was played five days later at Accrington's Crown Ground, also televised live on Sky Sports. Stevenage won the match 1–0, meaning a 3–0 aggregate victory. Chris Beardsley scored the only goal of the game in the 90th minute, turning in the area and beating Cisak with a neat finish. Twenty minutes prior to Beardsley's goal, Accrington were reduced to nine men within the space of a minute. Joe Jacobson was sent-off for a foul on Lawrie Wilson, while Sean McConville received a straight red card for violent conduct – raising his hand into Stacy Long's face on three separate occasions.

The win meant that Stevenage would play Torquay United in the 2010–11 League Two play-off final on 28 May 2011. Stevenage had never beaten Torquay prior to the final, and in the six previous meetings between the clubs, they had drawn twice and lost the other four games. Torquay had finished seventh in the league, and had beaten fourth placed Shrewsbury Town by a 2–0 aggregate scoreline in the semi-final on their way to the final. The final was hosted at Manchester United's Old Trafford stadium due to the UEFA Champions League 2011 final being held at Wembley Stadium. The game ended 1–0 to Stevenage, meaning the club had earned back-to-back promotions in their first ever season in the Football League. Stevenage dominated the first half and forged a number of chances – Craig Reid's shot was blocked following good work from Darius Charles, and Charles himself had a header tipped over the crossbar. Just five minutes before the interval, Stevenage took the lead through John Mousinho, who had missed the club's three previous games due to suspension. Mousinho picked the ball up 40 yards out and ran at the Torquay defence before beating goalkeeper Scott Bevan with a drilled shot from 25 yards out. Torquay improved in the second half and dominated the second period, Billy Kee was denied by Chris Day on two separate occasions, while Jake Robinson saw his 20-yard effort skim off the crossbar. Stevenage held on to secure the win and a book place in League One for the first time in their history.

Game	Date	Opponent	Venue	Result	Attendance	Goalscorers	Notes
SF1	15 May 2011	Accrington Stanley	Home	2–0	4,424	Long, Byrom	
SF2	20 May 2011	Accrington Stanley	Away	1–0	4,185	Beardsley	
F	28 May 2011	Torquay United	Neutral	1–0	11,484	Mousinho	

- Note: Stevenage goals come first.

=== League Cup ===
Stevenage participated in the Football League Cup for the first ever time during the club's 2010–11 campaign. First Round fixtures for the competition were released on 16 June 2010, with Stevenage being drawn against Championship opposition in the form of Portsmouth at Broadhall Way. The game took place on 9 August 2010. The match ended 2–1 to Portsmouth, with Darren Murphy scoring Stevenage's goal in the first–half with a long-range strike that was deflected. Murphy's goal had cancelled out Nadir Çiftçi's header, but Michael Brown's diving header just before half-time proved to be the winner.

Game	Date	Opponent	Venue	Result	Attendance	Goalscorers	Notes
1	9 August 2010	Portsmouth	Home	1–2	4,236	Murphy	

- Note: Stevenage goals come first.

=== FA Cup ===
The club entered the 2010–11 FA Cup at the first-round stage – the first time the club has entered the competition at this stage since 1997. First Round fixtures for the competition were released on 24 October 2010, with Stevenage being dealt a home draw against League One side Milton Keynes Dons. The game ended 0–0, with the replay taking place on 16 November at Stadium:mk. Stevenage won the replay 7–6 on penalties after the game had ended 1–1 after extra-time. MK Dons took the lead just four minutes into the second half, Lewis Guy scoring from close range after Stevenage had dominated for periods during the first-half. Substitute Darius Charles scored his first goal for the club deep into injury-time to take the game to extra-time, lashing home after David Martin fumbled Yemi Odubade's cross. Stevenage held their nerve from twelve yards to win 7–6 on penalties to ensure they progressed to the second round of the FA Cup for the first time since 2005. The win meant that Stevenage faced AFC Wimbledon at Kingsmeadow, who had beaten Ebbsfleet United after extra-time in the previous round. Stevenage's game against AFC Wimbledon was televised live on ITV, after the broadcaster had anticipated a tie between AFC Wimbledon and MK Dons. Stevenage won the match 2–0, courtesy of a free-kick from debutant Josh Walker that went in off the post in the first-half, and a tidy finish from substitute Yemi Odubade with ten minutes remaining.

The draw for the third round took place on 28 November 2010, with Stevenage being drawn at home to Premier League side Newcastle United. The teams last met in the fourth round of the same competition in January 1998, a tie that is remembered for Giuliano Grazioli's equaliser to take the game to a replay, as well as Alan Shearer's "controversial goal that appeared to not cross the line" in the replay at St James' Park. The game was televised on ESPN and took place on 8 January 2011 in front of a crowd of 6,644. Stevenage won the tie 3–1, becoming only the third team in the fourth tier of English football to beat a Premier League side since its formation. Stevenage took the lead five minutes into the second-half, Stacy Long's shot took a deflection off the head of Mike Williamson, beating the stranded Tim Krul. Five minutes later, Stevenage doubled their lead, Michael Bostwick picked up the loose ball and rifled in a shot that went in off the post from 25 yards out. Newcastle substitute Cheik Tiote was given a straight red card with twenty minutes remaining for a foul on Stevenage defender Jon Ashton. Joey Barton pulled a goal back for Newcastle in injury-time with a long range effort that dipped over Chris Day, but Stevenage replied instantly with Peter Winn neatly finishing past Krul after good work from John Mousinho.

The draw for the fourth round of the FA Cup was made on 9 January 2011. Stevenage were dealt a home draw against Championship side Reading, who had beaten Premier League side West Brom in the previous round. The game was played on 29 January 2011. Stevenage lost the tie 2–1 in front of a crowd of 6,614. Reading took the lead midway through the first-half, midfielder Mikele Leigertwood was given time and space to run at the Stevenage defence, and he side-footed the ball past Chris Day to ensure Reading had a one-goal interval at half-time. The hosts levelled the tie with just twenty minutes remaining, Stevenage broke from a Reading corner and the ball found its way to Darius Charles, who cut inside and curled the ball past the outstretched Adam Federici. Reading won the game with three minutes left, leading scorer Shane Long scoring from close range following Jobi McAnuff's teasing cross.

Game	Date	Opponent	Venue	Result	Attendance	Goalscorers	Notes
1	6 November 2010	Milton Keynes Dons	Home	0–0	2,956		
1R	16 November 2010	Milton Keynes Dons	Away	1–1p	3,977	Charles	
2	27 November 2010	AFC Wimbledon	Away	2–0	3,633	Walker, Odubade	
3	8 January 2011	Newcastle United	Home	3–1	6,644	Williamson (o.g), Bostwick, Winn	
4	29 January 2011	Reading	Home	1–2	6,614	Charles	

=== Football League Trophy ===
Stevenage also participated in the Football League Trophy for the first ever time as a league side during the club's 2010–11 campaign. First Round fixtures for the competition were released on 14 August 2010, with Stevenage being drawn against League One opposition in the form of Brentford at Broadhall Way. Stevenage lost the tie 1–0, with Brentford striker Robbie Simpson scoring the only goal of the game in the first-half.

Game	Date	Opponent	Venue	Result	Attendance	Goalscorers	Notes
1	31 August 2010	Brentford	Home	0–1	1,916		

- Note: Stevenage goals come first.

== League table ==
Pos	Team	Pld	W	D	L	GF	GA	GD	Pts	Promotion, qualification or relegation
4	Shrewsbury Town	46	22	13	11	72	49	+23	79	Qualification to League Two play-offs
5	Accrington Stanley	46	18	19	9	73	55	+18	73	Qualification to League Two play-offs
6	Stevenage (O, P)	46	18	15	13	62	45	+17	69	Qualification to League Two play-offs
7	Torquay United	46	17	18	11	74	53	+21	68 (Note: Torquay United deducted one point and Hereford United deducted three points)	Qualification to League Two play-offs
8	Gillingham	46	17	17	12	67	57	+10	68	

Updated to match(es) played on 28 May 2011. Source: The Football League
Rules for classification: 1) points; 2) goal difference; 3) number of goals scored.
(O) Play-off winners; (P) Promoted

== Season statistics ==
=== Starts and goals ===
No.	Pos	Nat	Player	Total		League Two		FA Cup		League Cup		FL Trophy	
No.	Pos	Nat	Player	Apps	Goals	Apps	Goals	Apps	Goals	Apps	Goals	Apps	Goals
1	GK	(England) ENG	Ashley Bayes	0	0	0	0	0	0	0	0	0	0
2	DF	(England) ENG	Lawrie Wilson	50	5	42+3	5	5	0	0	0	0	0
3	DF	(England) ENG	Scott Laird	54	4	45+2	4	5	0	1	0	1	0
4	DF	(England) ENG	Darius Charles	33	4	23+8	2	1+1	2	0	0	0	0
5	DF	(England) ENG	Jon Ashton	45	1	38+1	1	5	0	0	0	1	0
6	DF	(England) ENG	Luke Foster	24	1	16+8	1	0	0	0	0	0	0
7	MF	(Republic of Ireland) IRL	Darren Murphy	9	1	2+6	0	0	0	1	1	0	0
8	MF	(England) ENG	Stacy Long	30	3	22+3	3	3+1	0	0+1	0	0	0
10	FW	(England) ENG	Craig Reid	23	2	17+6	2	0	0	0	0	0	0
11	FW	(Nigeria) NGR	Yemi Odubade	23	2	5+11	1	0+5	1	1	0	1	0
12	FW	(England) ENG	Ben May	22	1	7+13	1	2	0	0	0	0	0
13	MF	(England) ENG	Joel Byrom	12	1	8+2	1	0	0	1	0	1	0
14	DF	(England) ENG	Mark Roberts	52	6	45	6	5	0	1	0	1	0
16	GK	(England) ENG	Chris Day	56	0	49	0	5	0	1	0	1	0
17	MF	(England) ENG	Peter Winn	33	3	13+16	2	2	1	0+1	0	1	0
18	MF	(England) ENG	David Bridges	24	1	8+11	1	2+2	0	0	0	0+1	0
20	FW	(England) ENG	Chris Beardsley	32	2	14+12	2	4	0	1	0	1	0
21	MF	(England) ENG	John Mousinho	44	8	37+2	8	4	0	0	0	1	0
23	MF	(England) ENG	Rob Sinclair	31	2	13+14	2	0+2	0	1	0	0+1	0
24	MF	(England) ENG	Michael Bostwick	51	3	44	2	5	1	1	0	1	0
25	DF	(England) ENG	Ronnie Henry	51	0	45	0	4	0	1	0	1	0
26	FW	(England) ENG	Byron Harrison	23	8	11+12	8	0	0	0	0	0	0
27	FW	(Tunisia) TUN	Dino Maamria	0	0	0	0	0	0	0	0	0	0
29	GK	(England) ENG	Joe Welch	0	0	0	0	0	0	0	0	0	0
31	GK	(England) ENG	Martyn Margarson	0	0	0	0	0	0	0	0	0	0
Players who left the club before the end of the season
9	FW	(England) ENG	Charlie Griffin	17	3	13+2	3	0+1	0	1	0	0	0
10	FW	(England) ENG	Lee Boylan	2	0	0+1	0	0	0	0+1	0	0	0
15	FW	(England) ENG	Luke Daley	2	0	0+2	0	0	0	0	0	0	0
15	FW	(England) ENG	Chris Holroyd	12	6	12	6	0	0	0	0	0	0
15	FW	(Finland) FIN	Njazi Kuqi	1	0	0+1	0	0	0	0	0	0	0
19	FW	(Kenya) KEN	Taiwo Atieno	1	0	1	0	0	0	0	0	0	0
19	FW	(England) ENG	Tim Sills	2	0	1	0	0	0	0	0	0+1	0
22	FW	(Republic of Ireland) IRL	Jay O'Shea	7	0	5	0	2	0	0	0	0	0
22	MF	(England) ENG	Marvin Williams	1	0	0+1	0	0	0	0	0	0	0
26	FW	(Republic of Ireland) IRL	Terry Dixon	3	0	0+1	0	0+2	0	0	0	0	0
28	MF	(England) ENG	Josh Walker	2	1	1	0	1	1	0	0	0	0
30	MF	(England) ENG	Peter Vincenti	5	1	1+4	1	0	0	0	0	0	0

- Note: '+' denotes appearance as a substitute.
- Note: 'League Two' column also includes League Two play-offs.
- Note: Herts Senior Cup games and statistics not included.

=== End of Season Awards ===
Award	Player
Supporters Association Player of the Year	Jon Ashton
Players' Player of the Year	Jon Ashton
The Comet Player of the Year	Jon Ashton

== Transfers ==
=== In ===
Pos	Player	From	Fee	Date	Notes
DF	Darius Charles (ENG)	Ebbsfleet United	Tribunal	18 May 2010	
MF	Peter Winn (ENG)	Scunthorpe United	Free transfer	26 May 2010	
DF	Luke Foster (ENG)	Mansfield Town	Free transfer	31 May 2010	
MF	Rob Sinclair (ENG)	Salisbury City	Free transfer	4 June 2010	
MF	John Mousinho (ENG)	Wycombe Wanderers	Free transfer	27 June 2010	
MF	Marvin Williams (ENG)	Östersunds FK	Free transfer	2 October 2010	
FW	Ben May (ENG)	Scunthorpe United	Free transfer	20 October 2010	
FW	Byron Harrison (ENG)	Carshalton Athletic	Free transfer	1 January 2011	
FW	Craig Reid (ENG)	Newport County	£90,000	31 January 2011	
FW	Taiwo Atieno (KEN)	Luton Town	Free transfer	11 February 2011	

=== Out ===
Pos	Player	To	Fee	Date	Notes
MF	Andy Drury (ENG)	Luton Town	Free transfer	27 May 2010	
DF	Mark Albrighton (ENG)	Kidderminster Harriers	Released	14 June 2010	
DF	Eddie Odhiambo (TAN)	Newport County	Released	14 June 2010	
MF	Marvin Williams (ENG)	Hemel Hempstead	Released	16 October 2010	
FW	Lee Boylan (ENG)	Chelmsford City	Released	8 January 2011	
FW	Peter Vincenti (ENG)	Aldershot Town	Free transfer	14 January 2011	
FW	Tim Sills (ENG)	Aldershot Town	Released	17 January 2011	
FW	Taiwo Atieno (KEN)	Unattached	Released	17 May 2011	

=== Loans in ===
Pos	Player	From	Date	End date	Notes
FW	Chris Holroyd (ENG)	Brighton & Hove Albion	23 September 2010	26 December 2010	
FW	Jay O'Shea (IRL)	Birmingham City	26 October 2010	16 January 2011	
MF	Josh Walker (ENG)	Watford	26 November 2010	23 December 2010	
FW	Luke Daley (ENG)	Norwich City	21 January 2011	23 February 2011	
GK	Joe Welch (ENG)	Histon	24 March 2011	31 May 2011	

=== Loans out ===
Pos	Player	To	Date	End date	Notes
FW	Tim Sills (ENG)	Rushden & Diamonds	24 September 2010	3 January 2011	
FW	Peter Vincenti (ENG)	Mansfield Town	22 October 2010	10 January 2011	
FW	Charlie Griffin (ENG)	Newport County	31 January 2011	17 May 2011	
FW	Yemi Odubade (NGA)	Newport County	31 January 2011	17 May 2011	

== See also ==
- 2010–11 in English football
- List of Stevenage F.C. seasons
