= Bishop Challoner School =

Former private school in Bromley, England

Location
- Bromley Road; Shortlands, Bromley, BR2 0BS; England; 51°24′25″N 0°00′13″W

Information
- Type: Private school
- Motto: Quantum Potes Tantum Aude (Dare to do your best)
- Religious affiliation: Roman Catholic
- Established: 1950
- Founder: Patrick Byrne
- Closed: 2025
- Local authority: London Borough of Bromley
- Department for Education URN: 101683 Tables
- President: Archbishop of Southwark
- Chair: Ticcy Colling
- Head teacher: Rachael Shields
- Gender: Coeducational
- Age: 3 to 18
- Enrolment: c. 300
- Houses: St Edmund and Catherine of Alexandria St Michael and St mother Teresa St Denis and St Margaret Ward St Patrick and St Josephine Bakita
- Website: bishopchallonerschool.com

Bishop Challoner School was an English independent coeducational Roman Catholic day school in Shortlands, Greater London, for children aged three to eighteen years. In June 2025 its closure on 4 July 2025 was announced.

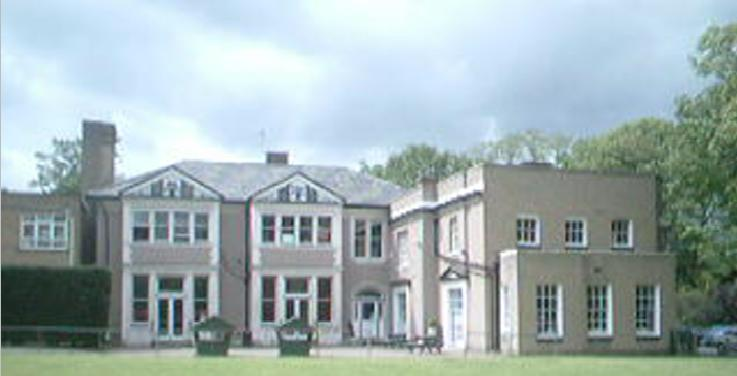
Bishop Challoner School

== History ==
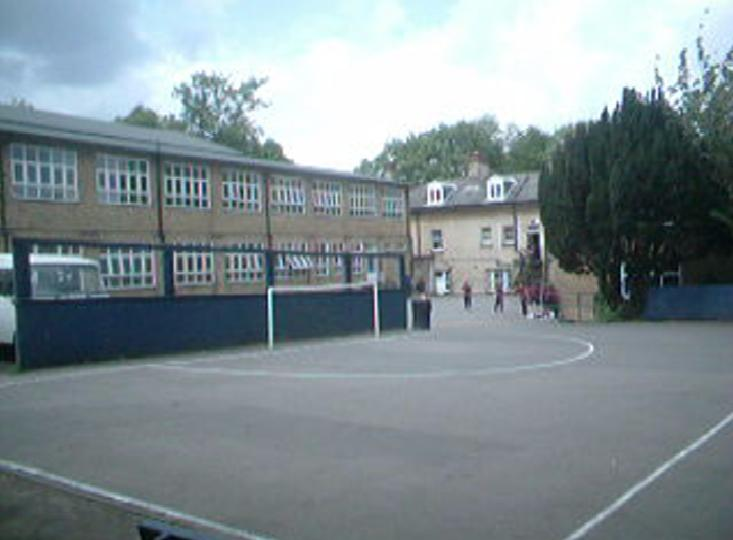
Playground

The school started as a junior school. In 1956 a senior wing was added. More classrooms and an assembly hall/gymnasium followed in 1963. The art block was opened in 1968 and another block – now the junior block – was opened in 1980. Challoner became co-educational in the Junior School in 1992, later extending into the Senior School. At the same time a nursery was opened. A new sixth form study centre was opened as well as a drama studio and art facilities.

The school became an independent charity limited by guarantee in December 2013 (It was formerly part of the Catholic Archdiocese of Southwark). It is governed by a board of trustees. In 2017, its refurbished chapel was blessed by Peter Smith, Archbishop of Southwark, and renamed "The Chapel of The Annunciation". The chapel contains four icons commissioned from the Bethlehem Icon School.

== Notable former pupils ==
- Orlando von Einsiedel (b. 1980) - film director
- Alex Clare (b. 1985) - musician
- Stacy Long (b. 1985) - footballer
- Bradley Pritchard (b. 1985) - footballer
