= Stacy Long =

English footballer (born 1985)

Personal information
- Full name: Stacy William Long
- Date of birth: 11 January 1985 (age 41)
- Place of birth: Bromley, London, England
- Height: 5 ft 8 in (1.73 m)
- Position: Midfielder

Youth career
- 1995–2005: Charlton Athletic

Senior career*
Years	Team	Apps	(Gls)
2005–2006	Notts County	19	(1)
2006–2009	Ebbsfleet United	118	(19)
2009–2012	Stevenage	73	(5)
2012–2013	AFC Wimbledon	28	(3)
2013–2014	Ebbsfleet United	11	(2)
2013–2014	→ Eastbourne Borough (loan)	16	(3)
2014–2015	Leatherhead	39	(6)
2015–2017	Ebbsfleet United	0	(0)
2019–2020	Glebe	42	(7)
Total		346	(46)

International career
2001–2002	England U16	4	(0)
2002–2003	England U17	10	(1)
2002–2003	England U18	6	(0)
2003–2004	England U19	8	(1)
2004–2005	England U20	1	(0)
2007	England C	1	(0)
- * Club domestic league appearances and goals

Stacy William Long (born 11 January 1985) is an English former professional footballer who played as a midfielder.

Long began his career at Charlton Athletic, joining the club's youth system in 1995 and spending a decade there without making a first-team appearance. He signed for Notts County ahead of the 2005–06 season, making his senior debut during his one year at the club. He then moved into non-League with Ebbsfleet United in July 2006, where he made 138 appearances and was part of the team that won the FA Trophy in May 2008. In June 2009, he joined Stevenage Borough, helping the club achieve consecutive promotions from the Conference Premier to League One.

After three years at Stevenage, Long joined AFC Wimbledon in June 2012. He rejoined Ebbsfleet United ahead of the 2013–14 season, during which he also had a loan spell at Eastbourne Borough. He joined Leatherhead of the Isthmian League Premier Division in August 2014, before initially retiring from playing to take up a coaching position at Ebbsfleet in October 2015, a position he held until November 2018. In February 2019, he joined Glebe as a player-coach, combining the role for three seasons until 2021. Internationally, Long represented England at youth level and earned one cap for the England C team in 2007.

== Early life ==
Born in Bromley, London, Long was educated at Bishop Challoner School, where his mother worked and where he met his wife.

== Club career ==
=== Early career ===
Long began his football career at Charlton Athletic in 1995 and progressed through the youth system. He signed a three-year professional contract in 2002 after impressing first-team manager Alan Curbishley. Upon signing the contract, Long stated: "Signing a professional contract is what I have always wanted ever since I first came to the club and was playing for the under-8 and under-9 sides". Despite featuring regularly for the reserve team, Long was released in May 2005, ending his ten-year association with the London club. Following his release, Long highlighted that Charlton's strong position at the time made it difficult for young players to break into the first team.

Ahead of the 2005–06 season, Long signed for Notts County on a one-year contract, following his successful trial at the club. He made his debut in a 1–0 victory over Wrexham on 9 August 2005, scoring the winning goal in the 90th minute. After appearing in Notts County's 2–0 home win against Stockport County on 17 December 2005, Long made only four further appearances during the remainder of the season. He played 23 times for Notts County during the 2005–06 season as they narrowly avoided relegation from the Football League, scoring two goals. At the end of the season, he was one of seven players released by the club.

Long subsequently joined Conference National club Gravesend & Northfleet on 26 July 2006. He made his debut for the club as a substitute in a 1–0 victory over Woking on 21 October 2006. Long scored his first goal later that season away at Kidderminster Harriers in a 2–1 victory on 3 March 2007. He made 31 appearances during the 2006–07 season. Long continued to feature regularly under Liam Daish in the club's 2007–08 season, playing 47 matches in all competitions and scoring 14 goals from midfield. His tally included consecutive braces against Grays Athletic and Weymouth. He was also a regular player in the club's successful FA Trophy campaign the same season, playing in all seven games, including the 1–0 victory over Torquay United in the final at Wembley Stadium on 10 May 2008. The 2008–09 season saw Long play 49 games for the Kent club, scoring four goals.

=== Stevenage ===
After being released by the newly renamed Ebbsfleet United at the end of the 2008–09 season, Long joined fellow Conference Premier club Stevenage on a one-year contract on 5 June 2009. He made his debut for the Hertfordshire team in the opening match of the 2009–10 season, starting in a 1–1 draw with Tamworth on 8 August 2009. Long found first-team opportunities limited in the first half of the season, making just eight appearances in four months. After providing two assists in Stevenage's 4–1 win against Cambridge United on New Year's Day, Long scored his first goal for the club in a 6–0 victory over Vauxhall Motors on 19 January 2010. Long played 26 times during the club's 2009–10 season, scoring five goals, as Stevenage finished the season as Conference Premier champions.

Long started his first match of the 2010–11 season on 4 September 2010, in a 1–1 draw against Crewe Alexandra, during which he was sent off in the 63rd minute for two bookable offences. He remained a regular starter throughout the remainder of 2010, scoring his first goal of the season in a 1–1 home draw with Shrewsbury Town on 23 November 2010. Long scored in Stevenage's 3–1 FA Cup victory against Premier League club Newcastle United on 8 January 2011. Long's shot from 25 yards out resulted in Stevenage's first goal, also providing the assist for Michael Bostwick's goal in the same match. Long made 30 appearances that season, scoring three goals, including three appearances in the 2010–11 League Two play-offs, following Stevenage's sixth-placed finish in the league. He scored in Stevenage's 2–0 home win over Accrington Stanley in the semi-final first leg on 15 May 2011, helping them secure a 3–0 aggregate victory. Stevenage earned promotion to League One after a 1–0 win against Torquay United at Old Trafford on 28 May 2011, with Long playing the full match.

He made his first appearance of the 2011–12 season in Stevenage's first-ever League One fixture, coming on as a 71st-minute substitute in a 0–0 draw with Exeter City on 6 August 2011. Long's first league goal of the season came against former club Charlton Athletic, on 15 October 2011. His deflected 25-yard shot wrong-footed Ben Hamer in the Charlton goal and gave Stevenage a 1–0 victory, ending Charlton's unbeaten league start to the season. He went on to make 32 appearances in all competitions for Stevenage during the season, scoring twice. Despite featuring more frequently than in either of his previous two seasons at the club, Long was released upon the expiry of his contract in May 2012.

=== AFC Wimbledon ===
Long joined League Two club AFC Wimbledon on 12 June 2012, signing on a free transfer and agreeing a one-year contract. He made his debut for the club in their opening match of the season, starting in a 3–1 defeat away to his previous employers, Stevenage, in a League Cup fixture on 14 August 2012. Long scored his first goal for the club in a 3–0 away win over York City on 10 November 2012. He made 32 appearances in all competitions during the season, scoring three times, as Wimbledon finished 20th in League Two, avoiding relegation by two points. Long was released at the end of the season.

=== Return to Ebbsfleet ===
Following his release from AFC Wimbledon, Long took a "significant wage drop" and "rejected better offers from League clubs" to rejoin Ebbsfleet United of the Conference South on 8 June 2013. Speaking about the move, Long stated: "I had a great experience here last time, obviously winning the Trophy at Wembley was the highlight for me, but overall it was a fantastic time and I hope to do the same under Steve Brown and achieve great things again". He made his second debut for Ebbsfleet in the club's opening match of the 2013–14 season, playing 88 minutes in a 0–0 draw with Havant & Waterlooville on 17 August 2013. Long made 12 appearances for Ebbsfleet during the first half of the season, five of which were as a substitute, scoring two goals.

Due to limited playing time, Ebbsfleet manager Steve Brown stated it was important for Long to gain match fitness, and he was subsequently loaned to fellow Conference South club Eastbourne Borough on an initial one-month deal on 15 January 2014. Long made his Eastbourne debut in a 3–1 defeat to Basingstoke Town on 18 January 2014. He scored his first goal for the club a week later, netting the first goal of the match as Eastbourne secured a 3–2 home victory over Bath City. The loan deal was later extended by a further two months, and Long went on to score three times in 16 appearances for Eastbourne. He returned to Ebbsfleet in April 2014, but remained an unused substitute for the remainder of the season. Long was released by the club at the end of the season.

=== Leatherhead ===
Following his release from Ebbsfleet, Long joined newly promoted Isthmian League Premier Division club Leatherhead on initial non-contract terms in August 2014. Long scored on his debut in the club's 2–1 home victory over AFC Hornchurch on 23 August 2014. He subsequently signed a one-year contract with the club on 29 August 2014. He went on to score five goals during the season, as Leatherhead finished in 11th position in the league, which Long described as a significant achievement, given it was the club's first season in the Premier Division following promotion.

He remained at Leatherhead for the start of the 2015–16 season, scoring his only goal of the season in a 4–4 draw with East Thurrock United on 5 September 2015, a match in which Leatherhead had trailed by three goals. Long was approached by former club Ebbsfleet in October 2015 regarding a vacant coaching position within the club's academy and under-21 set-up, having already been involved in the academy in a part-time capacity. He subsequently accepted the role and, in doing so, made the decision to retire from playing football on a full-time basis. Whilst coaching at Ebbsfleet, Long made five appearances for the club in the Kent Senior Cup across three seasons.

Long came out of retirement to play semi-professionally when he joined Southern Counties East League Premier Division club Glebe in a player-coach role on 15 February 2019. He scored eight goals in 56 appearances across three seasons, with the latter two seasons curtailed due to restrictions associated with the COVID-19 pandemic.

== International career ==
Long captained the England under-16 team in 2000, a squad that included future international Wayne Rooney, and went on to represent his country at various youth levels. He was later named in the England C team, who represent England at non-League level, for a friendly against the Northern Ireland C team in February 2007.

== Style of play ==
Long was primarily deployed as a left-sided midfielder. He was described by manager Liam Daish as a diminutive, skilful player with a goalscoring threat and noted for the quality of his set-piece deliveries.

== Coaching career ==
Long was initially appointed as lead development phase coach at Ebbsfleet United in July 2015, before later becoming an academy and under-21 coach in October 2015. He subsequently assumed both coaching and scouting responsibilities under first-team manager Daryl McMahon. Long left Ebbsfleet on 16 November 2018, following the departure of McMahon, as new manager Garry Hill implemented changes to the backroom staff.

== Career statistics ==
Appearances and goals by club, season and competition
Club	Season	League			FA Cup		League Cup		Other		Total	
Club	Season	Division	Apps	Goals	Apps	Goals	Apps	Goals	Apps	Goals	Apps	Goals
Charlton Athletic	2003–04	Premier League	0	0	0	0	0	0	0	0	0	0
Charlton Athletic	2004–05	Premier League	0	0	0	0	0	0	0	0	0	0
Charlton Athletic	Total		0	0	0	0	0	0	0	0	0	0
Notts County	2005–06	League Two	19	1	2	0	1	0	1 (Note: Appearance in Football League Trophy)	1	23	2
Ebbsfleet United	2006–07	Conference National	30	1	0	0	—		3 (Note: Appearance(s) in FA Trophy)	1	33	2
Ebbsfleet United	2007–08	Conference Premier	43	14	2	1	—		7	2	52	17
Ebbsfleet United	2008–09	Conference Premier	45	4	2	0	—		6	1	53	5
Ebbsfleet United	Total		118	19	4	1	0	0	16	4	138	24
Stevenage	2009–10	Conference Premier	21	2	0	0	—		5	3	26	5
Stevenage	2010–11	League Two	22	2	4	0	1	0	3 (Note: Appearances in 2011 League Two play-offs)	1	30	3
Stevenage	2011–12	League One	30	1	1	0	1	1	0	0	32	2
Stevenage	Total		73	5	5	0	2	1	8	4	88	10
AFC Wimbledon	2012–13	League Two	28	3	2	0	1	0	1	0	32	3
Ebbsfleet United	2013–14	Conference South	11	2	0	0	—		1	0	12	2
Eastbourne Borough (loan)	2013–14	Conference South	16	3	0	0	—		1	0	17	3
Leatherhead	2014–15	Isthmian League Premier Division	27	5	1	0	—		0	0	28	5
Leatherhead	2015–16	Isthmian League Premier Division	12	1	1	0	—		0	0	13	1
Leatherhead	Total		39	6	2	0	0	0	0	0	41	6
Ebbsfleet United	2015–16	National League South	0	0	—		—		2 (Note: Appearance(s) in Kent Senior Cup)	0	2	0
Ebbsfleet United	2016–17	National League South	0	0	0	0	—		2	0	2	0
Ebbsfleet United	2017–18	National League	0	0	0	0	—		1	0	1	0
Ebbsfleet United	Total		0	0	0	0	0	0	5	0	5	0
Glebe	2018–19	SCEFL Premier Division	12	2	—		—		0	0	12	2
Glebe	2019–20	SCEFL Premier Division	22	3	2	0	—		12 (Note: Six appearances and one goal in FA Vase; three appearances in Kent Senior Cup; two appearances in Southern Combination Challenge Cup)	1	36	4
Glebe	2020–21	SCEFL Premier Division	8	2	0	0	—		0	0	8	2
Glebe	Total		42	7	0	0	0	0	14	1	56	8
Career totals			346	46	15	1	4	1	47	10	412	58

== Honours ==
Ebbsfleet United

- FA Trophy: 2007–08

Stevenage

- Football League Two play-offs: 2011
- Conference Premier: 2009–10
- FA Trophy runner-up: 2009–10
