= Terry Dixon =

Irish footballer

Personal information
- Full name: Terry Noel Dixon
- Date of birth: 15 January 1990 (age 36)
- Place of birth: Archway, Islington, England
- Position: Striker

Team information
- Current team: Aylesbury

Youth career
- 2004–2007: Tottenham Hotspur

Senior career*
Years	Team	Apps	(Gls)
2007–2008	Tottenham Hotspur	0	(0)
2009–2010	West Ham United	0	(0)
2010	Stevenage	1	(0)
2011	Ware	2	(0)
2011	Tooting & Mitcham United	5	(1)
2011	Bradford City	0	(0)
2011	→ FC Halifax Town (loan)	4	(1)
2011–2013	Dover Athletic	25	(2)
2013–2014	Dunstable Town	?	(?)
2014	Berkhamsted	?	(?)
2014–	Aylesbury	?	(?)

International career
2005–2006	Republic of Ireland U16	1	(1)
2005–2007	Republic of Ireland U17	5	(3)
2007–2011	Republic of Ireland U21	2	(0)
- * Club domestic league appearances and goals as of 06:37, 20 November 2012 (UTC)

Terry Noel Dixon (born 15 January 1990) is a professional footballer who last played as a striker for Tring Athletic. Born in England, he has represented Ireland at youth level. He had previously played for Tottenham Hotspur, West Ham United, Stevenage, Ware, Tooting & Mitcham United, Bradford City and FC Halifax Town.

== Personal life ==
Dixon was born in Archway, Islington, London in 1990. His mother was born in Bailieborough, County Cavan, Ireland, and his father, who played for both Arsenal and Tottenham Hotspur youth teams, was born in Wood Green, London. He attended St.Ignatius College in Enfield, where he studied for GCSEs before joining Tottenham as an apprentice professional.

Dixon now works for a tunnelling company, and has a son, Teddy.

== Club career ==
=== Tottenham Hotspur ===
Dixon was invited to play for local children side Alexandra Palace by former Spurs player Garry Brooke, and at the age of eight was taken to Tottenham by Brooke, where Dixon worked his way through the junior teams at the club. He had his first serious knee injury at the age of 14, from which he took a year to recover. In the season of 2005–2006, aged 16 he played 11 games in the Under-18 side. He joined the Tottenham academy as an apprentice on 1 July 2006, but in August 2006, suffered a dislocated knee that ruled him out for the rest of the 2006–07 season. He signed a professional contract with the club on 17 January 2007 at the age of 17. Once he recovered he returned to training in order complete a possible move to Charlton Athletic on loan for the coming season, however, another dislocation of his knee cap in an academy game in September 2007 once again set him back. Following surgery and rehabilitation, the 19-year-old was released by Tottenham in March 2008.

=== West Ham United ===
In February 2009, Dixon signed for West Ham United after convincing the West Ham medical team of his fitness. Speaking of his move to West Ham, he said: "I'm pleased to have signed the contract and I'm glad to have got it sorted. I'm back in training next week and hopefully I want to push on to the first team towards the end of the season. I'm so relieved to be back to fitness as it's just so annoying to have those niggles because you have been out for so long. My aims for this season are to get matches under my belt for the reserves and if I do well there, hopefully I can get into the first-team squad. I want to repay the faith the club have shown in me, if not this season then the season after."

Dixon played his first competitive game for West Ham on 19 October 2009 in a reserve game against Chelsea reserves at Griffin Park. He made his first reserve start against Fulham on 3 November. Dixon completed his first 90 minutes for West Ham reserves on 24 November, scoring once and setting up two goals in the 5–2 win over Stoke City reserves. He made his fourth straight reserve appearance (and third straight start) in the 2–1 loss to Birmingham City reserves on 30 November. On 16 December 2009, Dixon hit the only goal of the game in the reserves' 1–0 friendly win against Grays Athletic. Dixon scored again in the reserves league win over Arsenal on 22 March 2010. In April 2010 Dixon's contact with West Ham was terminated by mutual consent. He had been unable to progress beyond the reserve team for whom he made eight competitive appearance, scoring two goals.

=== Stevenage ===
In October 2010, Dixon featured as a trialist for Stevenage's reserve side in a 2–2 draw against Ipswich Town. Stevenage manager Graham Westley said that Dixon was "struggling in terms of fitness", but had signed on non-contract terms. A month later, on 6 November, Dixon made his first-team debut for the club, coming on as an 82nd-minute substitute in the club's 0–0 draw against Milton Keynes Dons in the FA Cup. He was assigned the number 26 shirt. Westley said that Dixon "clearly had an enormous amount of talent", and is also "gradually shedding the pounds and getting fitter". Dixon made his second appearance for Stevenage on 27 November, again as a substitute, coming on in injury-time in Stevenage's 2–0 FA Cup away win against AFC Wimbledon. He made his first Football League appearance on 11 December, coming on as a 77th-minute substitute in Stevenage's 1–0 home loss to Northampton Town. Dixon was released by Stevenage in January 2011 after failing to agree terms with the player, who was still struggling in terms of fitness levels.

=== Non-League football ===
In February 2011, Dixon signed for Isthmian League Division One North club, Ware. Dixon made his debut for Ware in the club's 1–1 draw at Redbridge on 5 March, playing 67 minutes before being substituted. He played one more game for Ware, playing 63 minutes in a 3–0 home defeat to Waltham Abbey. In March 2011, Dixon left Ware after he failed to turn up to a number of training sessions. He subsequently joined Isthmian League Premier Division club Tooting & Mitcham United. Dixon scored his first goal for Tooting in a 3–3 draw at Tonbridge Angels, a scissor-kick volley from just outside the area with his back to goal. Tooting manager Mark Beard described the goal as "first-class", stating it reminded him "of some of the goals Mark Hughes scored where he let the ball come over his shoulder and then hit it first time on the volley".

=== Bradford City ===
Dixon signed a year-long contract with League Two club Bradford City on 31 August 2011. He was loaned out to Conference North club FC Halifax Town on a one-month deal. The loan deal was extended for another month, however when Bantams striker Ross Hannah suffered injury Dixon was recalled to the Bradford squad. After less than four months with the club, Dixon left Bradford to join Conference South club Dover Athletic on loan. He had played only two reserve team games and no first-team matches during his time at Bradford. After expressing a wish in January 2012 to stay with Dover until the end of the season, Dixon then signed a contract until May 2013.

== International career ==
Although born in London, Dixon opted to play for the Republic of Ireland, being eligible by virtue of his Irish-born mother, and made his under-16 debut for Ireland against Sweden in April 2005, scoring in the 47th minute. Dixon was used sparingly in the first phase of the UEFA Under-17 championship matches in Ukraine in September 2005 owing to his history of injury, but still scored a crucial equalising goal against Italy. In May 2006, he was called up to the Republic of Ireland senior squad by manager Steve Staunton at the age of 16, who said of him: "I just felt he has got a special talent and, if he progresses nicely, we will see the benefit in a couple of years. He is a young lad with great potential and, while he has got a lot to learn, he can already play with his back to goal. He is very confident on the ball and he knows where the goal is. There's not too many of them around", and was on the substitute bench for the friendly international against Chile. In August 2006, he was called up for the Republic of Ireland's Under-21 squad, and made his debut against the Belgium Under-21 side. He was awarded the Republic of Ireland's Under 17 Player of the Year 2006 trophy. In February 2010, Dixon was called up to the Irish U21 team for their friendly against Armenia. The Irish U21 manager Don Givens said of him "I have watched Terry at West Ham and he seems to be beginning to show the sort of form that made him stand out so much before his injuries. He has been terribly unfortunate over the last few years, but he seems to be putting that behind him now. There is no doubt that he is a great talent. He was out of the game for a long time but it is great to see him back playing and I'm really looking forward to having him involved." Dixon made a substitute appearance against Armenia, coming on for Sean Scannell after 62 mins, and set up Ian Daly for Ireland's consolation goal in the 2–1 defeat.

== Career statistics ==
Updated 29 April 2011.

Club	Season	League^{[A]}		FA Cup		League Cup		Other^{[B]}		Total	
Club	Season	Apps	Goals	Apps	Goals	Apps	Goals	Apps	Goals	Apps	Goals
Tottenham Hotspur	2007–08	0	0	0	0	0	0	0	0	0	0
Tottenham Hotspur	Total	0	0	0	0	0	0	0	0	0	0
West Ham United	2009–10	0	0	0	0	0	0	0	0	0	0
West Ham United	Total	0	0	0	0	0	0	0	0	0	0
Stevenage	2010–11	1	0	2	0	0	0	0	0	3	0
Stevenage	Total	1	0	2	0	0	0	0	0	3	0
Ware	2010–11	2	0	0	0	0	0	0	0	2	0
Ware	Total	2	0	0	0	0	0	0	0	2	0
Tooting & Mitcham United	2010–11	5	1	0	0	0	0	0	0	5	1
Tooting & Mitcham United	Total	5	1	0	0	0	0	0	0	5	1
Career totals		8	1	2	0	0	0	0	0	10	1

A. The "League" column constitutes appearances and goals (including those as a substitute) in the Football League and Isthmian League.
B. The "Other" column constitutes appearances and goals (including those as a substitute) in the Football League Trophy.
