= Yemi Odubade =

Nigerian association football player (born 1984)

Personal information
- Full name: Yemi Odubade
- Date of birth: 4 July 1984 (age 42)
- Place of birth: Lagos, Nigeria
- Height: 5 ft 7 in (1.70 m)
- Position: Striker

Senior career*
| Years | Team | Apps | (Gls) |
| 2001–2004 | Eastbourne Town | 75 | (70) |
| 2004–2005 | Yeovil Town | 4 | (0) |
| 2005–2006 | Eastbourne Borough | 34 | (17) |
| 2006–2009 | Oxford United | 135 | (29) |
| 2009–2011 | Stevenage | 51 | (14) |
| 2011 | → Newport County (loan) | 11 | (1) |
| 2011–2013 | Gateshead | 51 | (10) |
| 2013 | → Forest Green Rovers (loan) | 14 | (1) |
| 2013–2016 | Eastleigh | 90 | (12) |
| 2015 | → Woking (loan) | 15 | (7) |
| 2016–2017 | Maidstone United | 30 | (6) |
| 2017–2019 | Eastbourne Borough | 51 | (13) |
| 2018–2019 | → Weymouth (loan) | 7 | (3) |
| 2019–2020 | Weymouth | 47 | (12) |
| 2020–2022 | Salisbury | 17 | (4) |
| 2022 | Dorchester Town | 7 | (0) |
| 2022–2023 | AFC Totton | 7 | (0) |
| 2023 | Gosport Borough | 1 | (0) |
| Total | | 647 | (199) |
- * Club domestic league appearances and goals

Yemi Odubade (born 4 July 1984) is a Nigerian former professional footballer who played as a striker.

Odubade began his career in non-League football with Eastbourne Town, scoring 87 goals in three seasons before joining Yeovil Town in July 2004. After a spell at Eastbourne Borough, he signed for Oxford United in March 2005 and went on to make 149 appearances for the club. He joined Stevenage Borough in May 2009, helping the club win promotion to the Football League in the 2009–10 season, and had further spells with Newport County, Gateshead, and Eastleigh, where he won the Conference South title.

He subsequently played for a number of non-League clubs, including Maidstone United, Eastbourne Borough, Weymouth, Salisbury, Dorchester Town, AFC Totton, and Gosport Borough. With Weymouth, he won the Southern League Premier South title and helped the club achieve promotion to the National League during the 2019–20 season. Odubade concluded his playing career following his spell with Gosport and moved into coaching in 2024.

== Early life ==
Odubade was born in Lagos, Nigeria, but moved to England at a young age and was raised in East Sussex. He attended The Bishop Bell School in Eastbourne.

== Playing career ==
=== Early career ===
Odubade began his football career in England, playing in the Sussex County League for Eastbourne Town in 2001. He scored 87 goals in all competitions across three seasons at the East Sussex club, before attracting the attention of Yeovil Town manager Gary Johnson ahead of the 2004–05 season. He subsequently joined the club on a one-year contract on 29 July 2004 following a successful trial. He made his debut as a substitute for Yeovil in a 4–3 defeat against Torquay United in the Football League Trophy on 28 September 2004. His second appearance came in a 3–1 victory away to Histon in an FA Cup tie on 4 December 2004, during which he scored his only goal for the club in injury time. He made a further four appearances for Yeovil before leaving on 9 February 2005 for personal reasons, subsequently joining Conference South club Eastbourne Borough two days later. He made his Eastbourne Borough debut in the club's 2–0 victory against Basingstoke Town three days after signing, playing 45 minutes of the match. Odubade scored five goals in his first three matches for Eastbourne, including a hat-trick in the club's 4–0 home victory against Thurrock on 19 February 2005. His final goal of the season came in Eastbourne's 3–0 away win against Cambridge City in the play-off semi-finals on 7 May 2005, and he featured in the 2–1 defeat to Altrincham in the final. Odubade made 17 appearances for Eastbourne during the second half of the 2004–05 season, scoring 13 goals.

Odubade opted to remain at Eastbourne Borough ahead of the 2005–06 season, and subsequently started in the club's first game of the season, scoring the only goal in a 1–0 away victory against Bishop's Stortford. After scoring three goals in the club's first five fixtures, he did not score again until November 2005. Odubade played regularly in the club's FA Cup run during the same season, helping Eastbourne take Oxford United to a replay in November 2005. After impressing Oxford manager Brian Talbot over the two ties, Odubade signed for the League Two club for a fee of £25,000 on 27 January 2006, agreeing an 18-month contract. On signing for Oxford, Odubade stated: "It brings a tear to my eye just the thought of leaving Eastbourne. But I wanted to get back into the Football League and I just feel I am very lucky to have this second chance". In total, Odubade made 40 appearances for Eastbourne Borough in all competitions, scoring 20 goals.

=== Oxford United ===
Odubade made his debut a day after signing for the club, starting in a 3–0 defeat against Rushden & Diamonds at Nene Park, but was substituted after just 33 minutes with Rushden already three goals ahead. He scored his first goal for Oxford in a 2–1 defeat away to Wycombe Wanderers on 25 February 2006, having been introduced as a half-time substitute. Odubade played eight games during Oxford's 2005–06 season, scoring once, as the club were relegated to the Conference National.

Under new manager Jim Smith, Odubade started the 2006–07 season by appearing as a 60th-minute substitute in Oxford's 2–0 win against Halifax Town. He again featured as a substitute against Dagenham & Redbridge on 15 August 2006, scoring the only goal of the match in the 57th minute. Odubade's first 15 appearances of the 2006–07 season were all made as a substitute, before making his first start in Oxford's 1–1 draw against Altrincham on 14 October 2006. A week later, he retained his place in the starting line-up, scoring twice in Oxford's 3–0 victory against Cambridge United at the Abbey Stadium. A brace against Dagenham & Redbridge in a 2–2 draw on 26 March 2007 took Odubade's tally to 10 goals for the season. Oxford failed to secure promotion back to the Football League after losing on penalties to Exeter City in the play-offs, with Odubade scoring and assisting a goal across the two legs. He was named Oxford's Player of the Year at the end of the season. Odubade scored 12 goals in 46 appearances during the season.

Having not featured in the first team for three months, Odubade was transfer-listed by manager Darren Patterson on 18 March 2008. Shortly after, Patterson stated that Odubade had played his last game for the club, saying: "I think the best thing for him and us is that we go our separate ways". However, a week later, Patterson told Odubade that he "must start producing performances" if he wants to be removed from the transfer list. He was taken off the list after scoring three goals in four games towards the end of the season. Patterson explained that Odubade was removed because "he's now putting in a shift" every game. He finished the season as Oxford's top goalscorer. Odubade made 43 appearances in all competitions, scoring 11 times, as Oxford finished ninth.

Odubade scored his first goal of the 2008–09 season against Kettering Town on 6 September 2008, coming on as a 64th-minute substitute and scoring eight minutes later from close range. He scored in a 3–0 win against Barrow on 14 February 2009, which proved to be his final goal for Oxford. During the latter stages of the season, Odubade was primarily used as a substitute. He finished the season with seven goals in 46 appearances, 25 of which were from the substitutes' bench. In April 2009, new manager Chris Wilder decided not to renew Odubade's contract, citing the financial terms of his contract and his peripheral role during the season. Odubade was subsequently allowed to leave the club on a free transfer. Over his three-and-a-half-year spell at Oxford, he made 149 appearances and scored 33 goals.

=== Stevenage ===
Odubade signed for Conference Premier club Stevenage on a free transfer on 14 May 2009. He made his debut for the club as a substitute in Stevenage's 1–1 draw with Tamworth in the opening game of the 2009–10 season on 8 August 2009. Odubade scored his first goal for the club in a 2–1 defeat against his former club, Oxford United, scoring from close range. Throughout November 2009, Odubade became a regular first-team starter in the Stevenage squad, scoring twice in games against Gateshead and Chester City. He also scored the club's solitary goal in a 2–1 defeat against Ebbsfleet United on 2 December 2009, a game in which he was injured and subsequently substituted at half-time. Odubade then returned to the first team on 26 December 2009, scoring a penalty against Cambridge United, as well as assisting the third goal in a 3–1 victory. He scored one and assisted two other goals in the reverse fixture at Broadhall Way six days later, in a 4–1 win. Odubade scored a hat-trick in a 4–0 home victory against Barrow on 9 March 2010. He made 46 appearances during his first season at Stevenage, scoring 15 times and finished the season as the club's top goalscorer, a season in which the club won promotion to the Football League for the first time in their history after finishing as Conference Premier champions.

Odubade played in the club's first Football League match at the start of the 2010–11 season, coming on as a 60th-minute substitute in a 2–2 draw with Macclesfield Town on 7 August 2010. Odubade scored his first goal of the season in the club's 1–1 home draw against Crewe Alexandra on 4 September 2010, scoring from close range to give Stevenage the lead. In January 2011, Odubade joined Conference Premier club Newport County on loan until the end of the 2010–11 season. He made his Newport debut in the club's televised 3–3 away draw against Mansfield Town on 12 February 2011, coming on as an 82nd-minute substitute in the match. Odubade made his first start for Newport in a 2–2 away draw against Bath City on 22 February 2011, scoring the club's opening goal after 14 minutes. It was Odubade's only goal for Newport in the 11 appearances he made for the club, seven of which were as a substitute. He returned to his parent club on 17 May 2011.

=== Gateshead ===
Having been released by Stevenage at the end of the 2010–11 season, Odubade signed for Conference Premier club Gateshead on 7 June 2011. He joined on a free transfer, signing alongside Eddie Odhiambo, with whom he had previously played alongside at Oxford United, Stevenage and Newport County. Upon joining Gateshead, Odubade stated: "I have parted company with Stevenage on good terms and this is now a new chapter for me. Gateshead is a good club that is moving in the right direction and I'm sure we can kick on next season. I don't look back with any regrets as things happen for a reason. I am always looking forward. Gateshead is a new challenge for me and I can only see good things coming from it". He made his Gateshead debut on 13 August 2011 in the club's 3–2 away victory against Kidderminster Harriers at Aggborough, assisting Kris Gate's goal in the 80th minute. Odubade scored his first goal for the club three days later at Gateshead International Stadium in a 3–0 win against Mansfield Town, which was subsequently voted Goal of the Season in the club's end-of-season awards. His first season at Gateshead was disrupted by two foot injuries midway through the season, during which he broke his metatarsal bone on two occasions. Odubade made 34 appearances throughout the season, scoring seven goals. He signed a one-year contract extension with the club in May 2012.

Having made 24 appearances for Gateshead during the first half of the 2012–13 season, eight of which were as a substitute, Odubade was loaned to Conference Premier club Forest Green Rovers on 17 January 2013 for the remainder of the season. He made his debut on 19 January as a second-half substitute against Stockport County, in a match that Forest Green lost 2–1. Odubade scored his first goal for Forest Green on 12 March 2013 in a 2–1 victory over Southport. This proved to be his only goal during his loan spell, during which he made 14 league appearances. Odubade returned to Gateshead following the conclusion of the 2012–13 season and was one of seven players released by the club on 25 April 2013.

=== Eastleigh ===
Following his release from Gateshead, Odubade joined Conference South club Eastleigh on a free transfer on 31 May 2013. Upon signing Odubade, Eastleigh manager Richard Hill stated: "I was impressed with his own personal ambition and his desire to be successful and Yemi opted to sign for Eastleigh as he wants to be with a club that hold the same ambitions". He made his Eastleigh debut in the club's first match of the 2013–14 season, scoring the only goal of the game in a 1–0 victory over Sutton United on 17 August 2013. He scored eight times in 39 appearances during the season as Eastleigh won promotion to the Conference Premier after finishing as Conference South champions.

During the first half of the 2014–15 season, Odubade made 18 appearances for newly promoted Eastleigh, 16 of which were from the substitutes' bench, without registering a goal. He joined fellow Conference Premier club Woking on loan on 31 January 2015, on an agreement lasting until 25 April 2015. He made his Woking debut on the same day his signing was announced, coming on as a substitute in a 3–0 win over Alfreton Town. Odubade scored his first goal in the following match, a late consolation goal as Woking lost 2–1 at Barnet. He became a regular starter during the loan spell, scoring seven times in 14 appearances as Woking finished three points outside the play-off positions. Odubade returned to Eastleigh at the end of April 2015 and played in both of the club's play-off semi-final matches, scoring in the first leg in an eventual 2–1 defeat to Grimsby Town. Having been out of favour for much of the previous season, Odubade played regularly for Eastleigh during the 2015–16 season and scored seven goals in 44 appearances. He made just two appearances in the opening month of the 2016–17 season under new manager Ronnie Moore and, on 9 September 2016, left the club by mutual consent.

=== Maidstone United ===
Following his departure from Eastleigh, Odubade signed for National League club Maidstone United on 17 September 2016. He made his debut on the same day his signing was announced, as a 73rd-minute substitute in a 1–1 draw with Guiseley. Odubade made his first start a week later and scored twice in a 3–2 victory against Torquay United. Odubade scored an injury-time winner in a 1–0 victory over Boreham Wood on 17 April 2017, a goal that ultimately secured Maidstone's survival in the National League. Odubade scored six times in 35 appearances in all competitions during the season. He held discussions with manager Jay Saunders regarding the possibility of remaining at the club. Although Saunders praised Odubade's attitude and work-rate, it was mutually agreed that he would depart, as Odubade wished to join a club closer to where he lived.

=== Return to Eastbourne Borough ===
Ahead of the 2017–18 season, on 21 July 2017, Odubade rejoined National League South club Eastbourne Borough. Odubade made his second debut for Eastbourne Borough in the club's opening match of the season, scoring the first goal of the match in an eventual 3–2 home defeat to Braintree Town. Odubade played 35 times during his first season back at Eastbourne and scored 11 goals as the club finished in 18th place, four points above the relegation places. He remained at Eastbourne for the first half of the 2018–19 season, although he was predominantly used as a substitute, with 14 of his 18 appearances coming from the substitutes' bench, scoring three goals.

=== Weymouth ===
Having been limited to substitute appearances at Eastbourne during the first half of the season, Odubade was loaned to Southern League Premier South club Weymouth on an initial one-month deal on 8 December 2018. He made his debut in a 4–0 win over Frome Town on the same day his signing was announced, and scored his first goal for the club three days later in a 3–1 defeat to Gosport Borough. Odubade was praised by manager Mark Molesley for his performances during the loan spell and he went on to score three goals in seven appearances during the month. Following the conclusion of the loan agreement, Odubade joined the club on a permanent basis on 9 January 2019, after Weymouth supporters helped fund his contract extension for the remainder of the season. Odubade played regularly during the second half of the season, scoring eight goals in 29 appearances, including in the final game of the season as Weymouth secured the Southern League Premier South title with a 3–0 victory against Farnborough on 27 April 2019. Odubade described the goal as one of the most important goals of his career.

He scored ten times in 36 appearances in Weymouth's first season back in the National League South. The season was suspended in March 2020 due to the COVID-19 pandemic and the play-off positions were determined on a points-per-game basis, with Weymouth qualifying for the National League South play-off semi-finals after finishing third in the league standings. After entering the pitch as an 83rd-minute substitute in the club's play-off semi-final against Dorking Wanderers on 25 July 2020, Odubade scored a 95th-minute injury-time winner to secure a 3–2 victory. Weymouth earned promotion to the National League after defeating Dartford in a penalty shoot-out in the play-off final on 1 August 2020, with Odubade coming on as a substitute in the 85th minute. He was released by the club on 7 September 2020, with Weymouth stating Odubade "would be forever etched in the club's history for scoring two of the most important goals in their history".

=== Further spells in non-League ===
After leaving Weymouth, Odubade signed for Southern League Premier Division South club Salisbury on 13 September 2020. He made one appearance for Salisbury during the 2020–21 season, in a 6–0 victory over Tiverton Town in the FA Trophy on 31 October 2020, before the club's season was ultimately curtailed due to restrictions associated with the COVID-19 pandemic. Odubade scored four goals in 20 appearances for Salisbury during the first half of the 2021–22 season, before signing for divisional rivals Dorchester Town on 5 February 2022. He made seven appearances during his time at Dorchester, departing at the end of the season.

Having played in all of AFC Totton's pre-season friendlies ahead of the 2022–23 season, Odubade signed for the club on 22 July 2022. He made 13 appearances in all competitions for the Southern League Division One South club during the first half of the season, without registering a goal. He subsequently signed for Southern League Premier Division South club Gosport Borough on 17 February 2023, managed by his former manager at Weymouth, Mark Molesley, and made one appearance there.

== Style of play ==
Generally deployed as a striker during his playing career, Odubade was also utilised as a winger. He stated his best asset was his turn of pace, and that he was at his most dangerous when "running at opposition defences". Predominantly right-footed, he scored the majority of his goals with his right foot, but was also comfortable using his left.

During his time at Stevenage, manager Graham Westley used Odubade as the second striker in a 4–4–2 formation, sitting off the shoulder of the centre forward. Westley also utilised him in a 4–3–3 formation, usually on the right side of the front three. Odubade was described as possessing "blistering pace", which was emphasised following two goals away at Crawley Town in March 2010, when his pace left the Crawley defence "in their tracks".

== Coaching career ==
Odubade enrolled in the Player to Coach Scheme, a joint programme run by the Premier League, the EFL and the Professional Footballers' Association, designed to support former professional players in transitioning into full-time coaching roles. He graduated in December 2024 and subsequently began coaching at Exeter City.

== Career statistics ==
Appearances and goals by club, season and competition
| Club | Season | League | | | FA Cup | | League Cup | | Other | | Total | |
| Club | Season | Division | Apps | Goals | Apps | Goals | Apps | Goals | Apps | Goals | Apps | Goals |
|---|---|---|---|---|---|---|---|---|---|---|---|---|
| Eastbourne Town | 2000–01 | Sussex County League Division One | 1 | 0 | 0 | 0 | — | | 0 | 0 | 1 | 0 |
| Eastbourne Town | 2001–02 | Sussex County League Division Two | 15 | 10 | 0 | 0 | — | | 5 (Note: Appearances in Sussex County League Challenge Cup and Sussex Senior Cup) | 2 | 20 | 12 |
| Eastbourne Town | 2002–03 | Sussex County League Division Two | 34 | 36 | 0 | 0 | — | | 13 | 9 | 47 | 44 |
| Eastbourne Town | 2003–04 | Sussex County League Division One | 25 | 24 | 0 | 0 | — | | 10 | 7 | 25 | 31 |
| Eastbourne Town | Total | | 75 | 70 | 0 | 0 | 0 | 0 | 28 | 18 | 103 | 87 |
| Yeovil Town | 2004–05 | League Two | 4 | 0 | 1 | 1 | 0 | 0 | 1 (Note: Appearance(s) in Football League Trophy) | 0 | 6 | 1 |
| Eastbourne Borough | 2004–05 | Conference South | 14 | 12 | 0 | 0 | — | | 3 (Note: Appearances in 2005 Conference North/South play-offs) | 1 | 17 | 13 |
| Eastbourne Borough | 2005–06 | Conference South | 20 | 5 | 5 | 2 | — | | 0 | 0 | 25 | 7 |
| Eastbourne Borough | Total | | 34 | 17 | 5 | 2 | 0 | 0 | 3 | 1 | 42 | 20 |
| Oxford United | 2005–06 | League Two | 8 | 1 | 0 | 0 | 0 | 0 | 0 | 0 | 8 | 1 |
| Oxford United | 2006–07 | Conference National | 44 | 12 | 2 | 0 | — | | 6 (Note: Four appearances in FA Trophy; two appearances in 2007 Conference National play-offs) | 0 | 52 | 12 |
| Oxford United | 2007–08 | Conference Premier | 40 | 10 | 4 | 1 | — | | 3 (Note: Appearance(s) in FA Trophy) | 0 | 47 | 11 |
| Oxford United | 2008–09 | Conference Premier | 43 | 6 | 4 | 1 | — | | 3 | 0 | 50 | 7 |
| Oxford United | Total | | 135 | 29 | 10 | 2 | 0 | 0 | 12 | 0 | 149 | 31 |
| Stevenage Borough | 2009–10 | Conference Premier | 36 | 13 | 3 | 0 | — | | 7 | 2 | 46 | 15 |
| Stevenage | 2010–11 | League Two | 15 | 1 | 5 | 1 | 1 | 0 | 1 | 0 | 22 | 2 |
| Stevenage | Total | | 51 | 14 | 8 | 1 | 1 | 0 | 8 | 2 | 68 | 17 |
| Newport County (loan) | 2010–11 | Conference Premier | 11 | 1 | 0 | 0 | — | | 0 | 0 | 11 | 1 |
| Gateshead | 2011–12 | Conference Premier | 29 | 7 | 1 | 0 | — | | 4 | 0 | 34 | 7 |
| Gateshead | 2012–13 | Conference Premier | 22 | 3 | 1 | 0 | — | | 1 | 1 | 24 | 4 |
| Gateshead | Total | | 51 | 10 | 2 | 0 | 0 | 0 | 5 | 1 | 58 | 11 |
| Forest Green Rovers (loan) | 2012–13 | Conference Premier | 14 | 1 | 0 | 0 | — | | 0 | 0 | 14 | 1 |
| Eastleigh | 2013–14 | Conference South | 35 | 7 | 1 | 0 | — | | 5 | 0 | 41 | 7 |
| Eastleigh | 2014–15 | Conference Premier | 13 | 0 | 3 | 0 | — | | 5 (Note: One appearance in FA Trophy; two appearances and two goals in Hampshire Senior Cup; two appearances in 2015 Conference Premier play-offs) | 2 | 21 | 3 |
| Eastleigh | 2015–16 | National League | 40 | 5 | 3 | 1 | — | | 1 | 1 | 44 | 7 |
| Eastleigh | 2016–17 | National League | 2 | 0 | 0 | 0 | — | | 0 | 0 | 2 | 0 |
| Eastleigh | Total | | 90 | 12 | 7 | 1 | 0 | 0 | 11 | 3 | 109 | 16 |
| Woking (loan) | 2014–15 | Conference Premier | 15 | 7 | 0 | 0 | — | | 0 | 0 | 15 | 7 |
| Maidstone United | 2016–17 | National League | 30 | 6 | 3 | 0 | — | | 2 | 0 | 35 | 6 |
| Eastbourne Borough | 2017–18 | National League South | 33 | 9 | 1 | 2 | — | | 1 | 0 | 35 | 11 |
| Eastbourne Borough | 2018–19 | National League South | 18 | 4 | 2 | 1 | — | | 1 | 0 | 21 | 5 |
| Eastbourne Borough | Total | | 51 | 13 | 3 | 3 | 0 | 0 | 2 | 0 | 56 | 16 |
| Weymouth | 2018–19 | Southern League Premier South | 27 | 8 | 0 | 0 | — | | 2 (Note: One appearance in FA Trophy; one appearance in 2019 Southern League Champions match) | 0 | 29 | 8 |
| Weymouth | 2019–20 | National League South | 27 | 7 | 3 | 2 | — | | 6 (Note: Two appearances in FA Trophy; two appearances in Dorset Senior Cup; two appearances and one goal in 2020 National League South play-offs) | 1 | 36 | 10 |
| Weymouth | Total | | 54 | 15 | 3 | 2 | 0 | 0 | 8 | 1 | 65 | 18 |
| Salisbury | 2020–21 | Southern League Premier South | 0 | 0 | 0 | 0 | — | | 1 | 0 | 1 | 0 |
| Salisbury | 2021–22 | Southern League Premier South | 17 | 4 | 0 | 0 | — | | 3 (Note: One appearance in FA Trophy; one appearance in Southern League Cup; one appearance in Wiltshire Premier Shield) | 0 | 20 | 4 |
| Salisbury | Total | | 17 | 4 | 0 | 0 | 0 | 0 | 4 | 0 | 21 | 4 |
| Dorchester Town | 2021–22 | Southern League Premier South | 7 | 0 | 0 | 0 | — | | 0 | 0 | 7 | 0 |
| AFC Totton | 2022–23 | Southern League Division One South | 7 | 0 | 2 | 0 | — | | 4 (Note: Three appearances in FA Trophy; one appearance in Hampshire Senior Cup) | 0 | 13 | 0 |
| Gosport Borough | 2022–23 | Southern League Premier South | 1 | 0 | 0 | 0 | — | | 0 | 0 | 1 | 0 |
| Career totals | | | 647 | 199 | 44 | 12 | 1 | 0 | 88 | 26 | 779 | 237 |

== Honours ==
Eastbourne Town

- Sussex County League Division Two runner-up: 2002–03
- Sussex County League Division Two Cup runner-up: 2001–02

Stevenage

- Conference Premier: 2009–10;
- FA Trophy runner-up: 2009–10

Eastleigh

- Conference South: 2013–14

Weymouth

- Southern League Premier South: 2018–19
- National League South play-offs: 2019–20

Individual

- Oxford United Player of the Season: 2006–07
