= 2011 Football League play-offs =

Football League play-offs
- Season: 2010–11
- Champions: Swansea City (Championship); Peterborough United (League One); Stevenage (League Two)
- Matches: 15
- Goals: 37 (2.47 per match)
- Biggest home win: Swansea 3–1 Nottm Forest (Championship)
- Biggest away win: Cardiff 0–3 Reading (Championship)
- Highest scoring: Reading 2–4 Swansea; Huddersfield 3–3 Bournemouth (6 goals)
- Highest attendance: 86,581 – Reading v Swansea (Championship final)
- Lowest attendance: 4,130 – Torquay v Shrewsbury (League Two semi-final)
- Average attendance: 20,733

The Football League play-offs for the 2010–11 season (referred to as the npower Football League Play-Offs for sponsorship reasons) were held in May 2011. The Championship final took place at Wembley Stadium in London, but the League One and Two finals were held at Old Trafford in Manchester, due to a clash with the UEFA Champions League Final.

The play-off semi-finals were played over two legs, contested by the teams who finished in 3rd, 4th, 5th and 6th place in the Football League Championship and League One and the 4th-, 5th-, 6th- and 7th-placed teams in the League Two table. The winners of the semi-finals went through to the finals, with the winner of the final gaining promotion for the following season.

The semi-final matches were played from 12 to 20 May 2011. The finals were held between 28 and 30 May 2011.

== Background ==
The Football League play-offs have been held every year since 1987. They take place for each division following the conclusion of the regular season and are contested by the four clubs finishing below the automatic promotion places.

== Championship ==
Pos	Team	Pld	W	D	L	GF	GA	GD	Pts
3	Swansea City	46	24	8	14	69	42	+27	80
4	Cardiff City	46	23	11	12	76	54	+22	80
5	Reading	46	20	17	9	77	51	+26	77
6	Nottingham Forest	46	20	15	11	69	50	+19	75

=== Bracket ===
Semi-finals
3	Swansea City	0	3	3
6	Nottingham Forest	0	1	1
4	Cardiff City	0	0	0
5	Reading	0	3	3

Final
3	Swansea City	4
5	Reading	2

=== Semi-finals ===
First leg

12 May 2011
19:45

Nottingham Forest	0–0	Swansea City
	Report

City Ground, Nottingham
Attendance: 27,881
Referee: Mike Dean

13 May 2011
19:45

Reading	0–0	Cardiff City
	Report

Madejski Stadium, Reading
Attendance: 21,485
Referee: Mark Halsey

Second leg

16 May 2011
19:45

Swansea City	3–1	Nottingham Forest
Britton 28'; Dobbie 33'; Pratley 90+3'	Report	Earnshaw 80'

Liberty Stadium, Swansea
Attendance: 19,816
Referee: Andre Marriner

Swansea City won 3–1 on aggregate.

17 May 2011
19:45

Cardiff City	0–3	Reading
	Report	Long 28', 45' (pen.); McAnuff 84'

Cardiff City Stadium, Cardiff
Attendance: 24,081
Referee: Howard Webb

Reading won 3–0 on aggregate.

=== Final ===
30 May 2011
15:00

Reading	2–4	Swansea City
Allen 49' (o.g.); Mills 57'	Report	Sinclair 21' (pen.), 22', 80' (pen.); Dobbie 40'

Wembley Stadium, London
Attendance: 86,581
Referee: Phil Dowd

== League One ==
Pos	Team	Pld	W	D	L	GF	GA	GD	Pts
3	Huddersfield Town	46	25	12	9	77	48	+29	87
4	Peterborough United	46	23	10	13	106	75	+31	79
5	Milton Keynes Dons	46	23	8	15	67	60	+7	77
6	Bournemouth	46	19	14	13	75	54	+21	71

=== Bracket ===
Semifinals
3	Huddersfield Town (p)	1	3	4 (4)
6	AFC Bournemouth	1	3	4 (2)
4	Peterborough United	2	2	4
5	Milton Keynes Dons	3	0	3

Final
3	Huddersfield Town	0
4	Peterborough United	3

=== Semi-finals ===
First leg

14 May 2011
12:45

Bournemouth	1–1	Huddersfield Town
McDermott 60'	Report	Kilbane 22'

Dean Court, Bournemouth
Attendance: 9,043
Referee: Mick Russell

15 May 2011
12:15

Milton Keynes Dons	3–2	Peterborough United
Powell 47'; Baldock 50'; Balanta 56'	Report	Mackail-Smith 8'; McCann 81' (pen.)

Stadium mk, Milton Keynes
Attendance: 12,662
Referee: Jonathan Moss

Second leg

18 May 2011
19:45

Huddersfield Town	3–3 (a.e.t.)	Bournemouth
Peltier 26'; Ward 45+2'; Kay 105+2'	Report	Lovell 44' (pen.), 63'; Ings 104'
Penalties
Novak (penalty scored); Ward (penalty scored); Kilbane (penalty scored); Kay (penalty scored)	4–2	(penalty scored) Symes; (penalty missed) Feeney; (penalty missed) Robinson; (penalty scored) Cooper

Galpharm Stadium, Huddersfield
Attendance: 16,444
Referee: Neil Swarbrick

Huddersfield Town 4–4 Bournemouth on aggregate. Huddersfield Town won 4–2 on penalties.

19 May 2011
19:45

Peterborough United	2–0	Milton Keynes Dons
McCann 11'; Mackail-Smith 54'	Report

London Road, Peterborough
Attendance: 11,920
Referee: Colin Webster

Peterborough United won 4–3 on aggregate.

=== Final ===
29 May 2011
15:00

Huddersfield Town	0–3	Peterborough United
	Report	Rowe 78'; Mackail-Smith 80'; McCann 85'

Old Trafford, Manchester
Attendance: 48,410
Referee: Steve Tanner

== League Two ==
Pos	Team	Pld	W	D	L	GF	GA	GD	Pts
4	Shrewsbury Town	46	22	13	11	72	49	+23	79
5	Accrington Stanley	46	18	19	9	73	55	+18	73
6	Stevenage	46	18	15	13	62	45	+17	69
7	Torquay United	46	17	18	11	74	53	+21	68*

*Torquay deducted 1 point for fielding an unregistered player.

=== Bracket ===
Semifinals
4	Shrewsbury Town	0	0	0
7	Torquay United	2	0	2
5	Accrington Stanley	0	0	0
6	Stevenage	2	1	3

Final
6	Stevenage	1
7	Torquay United	0

=== Semi-finals ===
First leg

14 May 2011
17:45

Torquay United	2–0	Shrewsbury Town
Zebroski 29'; O'Kane 45+3'	Report

Plainmoor, Torquay
Attendance: 4,130
Referee: Scott Mathieson

15 May 2011
19:45

Stevenage	2–0	Accrington Stanley
Long 24'; Byrom 45'	Report

Broadhall Way, Stevenage
Attendance: 4,424
Referee: Roger East

Second leg

20 May 2011
19:45

Shrewsbury Town	0–0	Torquay United
	Report

Greenhous Meadow, Shrewsbury
Attendance: 8,452
Referee: Kevin Wright

Torquay United won 2–0 on aggregate.

20 May 2011
19:45

Accrington Stanley	0–1	Stevenage
	Report	Beardsley 90'

Crown Ground, Accrington
Attendance: 4,185
Referee: Russell Booth

Stevenage won 3–0 on aggregate.

=== Final ===
28 May 2011
15:15

Stevenage	1–0	Torquay United
Mousinho 41'	Report

Old Trafford, Manchester
Attendance: 11,484
Referee: Darren Deadman
