= Graham Westley =

Association football manager (born 1968)

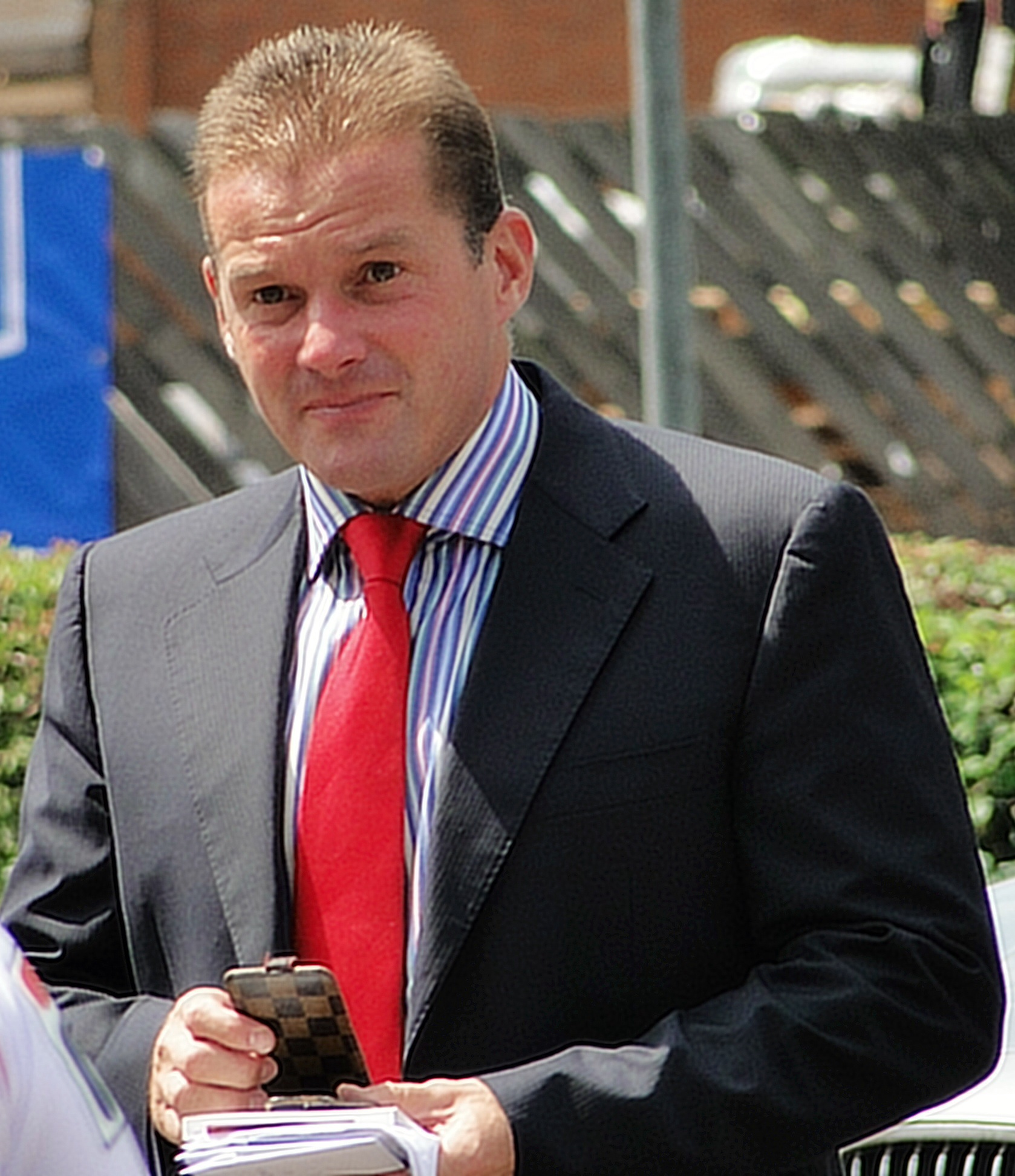
- Westley in 2014

Personal information
- Full name: Graham Neil Westley
- Date of birth: 4 March 1968 (age 58)
- Place of birth: Hounslow, England
- Height: 5 ft 9 in (1.75 m)
- Position: Striker

Youth career
- 1982–1986: Queens Park Rangers

Senior career*
Years	Team	Apps	(Gls)
1986–1987	Gillingham	2	(0)
1987	Barnet	3	(1)
1987–1988	Wycombe Wanderers		
1988–1990	Kingstonian		
1990	Wealdstone		
1990	Farnborough Town		
1990	Harlow Town		
1990–1992	Enfield		
1992	Aylesbury United	23	(18)
1992–1993	Harrow Borough		
1993	Tooting & Mitcham United		
1993	Molesey		
1994	Walton & Hersham		

International career
1985	England U17	1	(0)
1985	England U18	1	(0)

Managerial career
- 1996–1997: Kingstonian
- 1997–1998: Enfield
- 1999–2003: Farnborough Town
- 2003–2006: Stevenage Borough
- 2006–2007: Rushden & Diamonds
- 2007: Kettering Town (caretaker)
- 2008–2012: Stevenage
- 2012–2013: Preston North End
- 2013–2015: Stevenage
- 2015–2016: Peterborough United
- 2016–2017: Newport County
- 2018: Barnet
- 2019–2020: Stevenage
- * Club domestic league appearances and goals

Graham Neil Westley (born 4 March 1968) is an English professional football manager and former player who played as a striker.

An England youth international, Westley's playing career was spent largely in non-League football before being curtailed by injury. He began his managerial career at Kingstonian in 1996 at the age of 28, before taking charge of Enfield for the 1997–98 season. In 1999, he acquired a controlling interest in Farnborough Town and appointed himself manager, leading the club to promotion to the Football Conference in 2001. He transferred his shareholding and departed Farnborough in January 2003 to take up the vacant managerial position at Stevenage Borough. Stevenage reached the 2005 Conference National play-off final but were defeated, and Westley left the club a year later. He then had a three-month spell at Rushden & Diamonds, as well as four matches as caretaker manager of Kettering Town in 2007.

Westley rejoined Stevenage in May 2008, earning his first managerial honour at national level when the club won the 2009 FA Trophy final. The following season, he guided Stevenage to the Conference Premier title, securing promotion to the Football League for the first time in the club's history. In his first season as a Football League manager, he led the team to a second successive promotion via the play-offs. He left for Preston North End in January 2012, though was dismissed just over a year later in February 2013, returning to Stevenage the following month for a third spell until May 2015. He spent most of the 2015–16 season managing Peterborough United and had a five-month spell at Newport County the following season. He was subsequently appointed head coach of Barnet in January 2018, before returning to Stevenage for a fourth time, serving a two-month spell from December 2019.

== Early life ==
Born in Hounslow, London, Westley left school at the age of 16 to pursue a career in football. He briefly undertook an accountancy course, which he did not complete. His grandfather had founded the J&D Organisation in the 1940s, a company providing services to building contractors. Westley joined the business at 19 and, by 1997, was managing it alongside his football career. During this period the company's turnover increased from £1 million to £20 million and its workforce expanded from 50 to 700 employees.

== Playing career ==
Westley began his footballing career as an apprentice with Queens Park Rangers at the age of 16. He represented England at youth level, earning one cap for the under-17 team at the Tournoi Juniors in Cannes in April 1985, and another for the under-18 team in September of the same year. He signed for Gillingham in March 1986, making two Third Division appearances before joining Barnet. He made his Barnet debut in a 2–2 draw against Macclesfield Town at Moss Rose and scored one goal in three appearances during his time there.

Westley joined Wycombe Wanderers in the latter part of 1987 for a fee of £7,500, marking his debut with a goal in a 2–1 away victory against Telford United. He scored in each of the club's next two matches and established himself as a regular on the left wing until the departure of manager Peter Suddaby in January 1988. Under Suddaby's successor, Jim Kelman, Westley made one further appearance before moving to Kingstonian. In total, he made 24 appearances for Wycombe in the 1987–88 season, scoring five goals in all competitions.

He subsequently represented a number of non-League clubs, including Kingstonian, Wealdstone, Farnborough Town, Harlow Town, Enfield, Aylesbury United, Harrow Borough, Tooting & Mitcham United, Molesey and Walton & Hersham, three of which he later managed. He scored 33 goals and was named Player of the Season at Enfield during the 1990–91 season, before joining Aylesbury United in December 1992 in exchange for Darren Collins. While at Kingstonian, he suffered a dislocated ankle and a triple leg fracture, an injury that ultimately curtailed his playing career.

== Managerial career ==
=== Early management ===
While recovering from a broken leg, at the age of 28 in December 1996, Westley was appointed manager of Kingstonian after approaching the club about their vacant managerial position. His first two matches in charge both ended in 4–4 draws, against Walton & Hersham and Harrow Borough respectively, with Westley later stating: "at the time, there was something raw and exciting about the team that I sent out. Although there was also something evidently missing". His first victory as manager came in a 2–0 victory against Wokingham Town in the Isthmian League Cup, followed by his first league win in the subsequent fixture, a 5–2 victory away to Aylesbury United. Kingstonian ultimately drew clear of relegation, with Westley recalling a 3–2 win over champions Yeovil Town at Huish Park as a "memorable victory". Despite guiding Kingstonian to safety, he was dismissed after five months and replaced by Geoff Chapple. He managed the club for 25 matches, recording nine wins, eight draws and eight defeats.

In September 1997, Westley was appointed as manager of Enfield, another club for which he had previously played, then competing in the Isthmian League Premier Division. He named Graham Pearce as his assistant, who had also previously played for and managed the club. Despite Enfield's financial difficulties, Westley outlined his ambition to return the club to the top tier of non-League football, stating: "my ambition is to see silverware in the table, and if you can't take the pressure, you shouldn't take big jobs like this one". His first match in charge was a 2–0 home defeat to St Albans City. Enfield finished in seventh in Westley's first season, and he left the club after nine months in charge. He managed the team for 41 matches, recording 19 wins, 16 defeats, and six draws, with a win percentage of 46.34%.

=== Farnborough Town ===
In 1999, Westley acquired a controlling interest in Farnborough Town and appointed himself as manager. He led the club to a 12th-place finish in his first season and enjoyed success in the Isthmian Cup, winning the competition in 2000. In the following season, Farnborough won the Isthmian League Premier Division, securing 31 victories from 42 matches and accumulating 99 points. Westley overhauled the squad shortly after the club's promotion to the Football Conference, which he later described as a "huge regret". At this point, he also attempted to arrange a merger with Kingstonian, citing the club's Football League-rated ground as the reasoning behind his proposal, although it ultimately did not happen due to fan resistance.

During the 2001–02 season, the club consolidated its position in the first tier of non-League football, finishing in seventh place in the league. In the following season, Westley managed the club to the third round of the FA Cup after a 3–0 victory at Southport, where they faced Darlington at Feethams. They won the match 3–2 and the club was drawn at home to Arsenal in the fourth round. The match was moved to Highbury, Arsenal's home stadium, as the tie was expected to generate £600,000 in gate receipts from playing there, whereas staging the match at Cherrywood Road would have yielded the club an estimated £50,000. Westley departed the club after the sell-out 'home' tie at Highbury, which they lost 5–1. Shortly after his resignation, he became manager at Football Conference club Stevenage Borough in January 2003, signing a three-year contract. Westley confirmed he would be transferring his shareholding in Farnborough to other existing shareholders and would also be withdrawing his financial backing from the club. Upon moving to Stevenage, Westley said, "I've enjoyed my time at Farnborough, but I feel that I need to move on now and that I need to concentrate on football management, which is where my ambitions lie". He also stated that Stevenage's "long-term potential" was another key factor behind the move.

=== Stevenage ===
When Westley took over the Hertfordshire club, Stevenage were positioned in 21st place in the Football Conference and six points adrift of safety. Westley was appointed as first-team manager, with no board involvement. With the initial objective of keeping the club in the highest tier in non-League football, he signed seven players from his previous club, Farnborough, as well as his former assistant Graham Pearce, and goalkeeping coach Graham Benstead. His first match as manager of the club was a 1–1 draw at home to Morecambe on 13 February 2003, before earning his first win as Stevenage manager in his third match, a 2–0 victory away to local rivals Barnet on 8 March 2003. The victory served as the catalyst for an eight-match unbeaten run, which included six consecutive victories and ensured the club avoided relegation, finishing the season in 12th place. Stevenage finished in eighth position during the 2003–04 season, Westley's first full season.

As was the case in previous seasons, Westley made wholesale changes at the end of the season, releasing several of the players he had originally signed from Farnborough and replacing them with a combination of players with Football League experience, as well as players recruited from further down the non-League pyramid. Westley also provided first team opportunities to players who had progressed through the club's youth system, including George Boyd. The new squad lost five of the opening eight matches of the club's league season. Following a 4–1 home defeat to part-time Canvey Island, and with Stevenage supporters calling for Westley's departure, he walked across the pitch to the East Terrace and told supporters he "would turn it around". The team responded with four consecutive victories. Stevenage entered the final day of the season needing to beat already-relegated Leigh RMI and also relying on Tamworth to avoid defeat against Morecambe, who were occupying the final play-off position. Stevenage defeated Leigh 2–0, while Tamworth held Morecambe to a goalless draw, meaning Stevenage had qualified for the play-offs. They overcame second-placed Hereford United 2–1 on aggregate before losing 1–0 to Carlisle United at the Britannia Stadium in the final.

The 2005–06 season marked Westley's third season as manager of the club. Although the team were consistent at Broadhall Way throughout the season, they did not replicate this form away from home, winning four away matches all season. There were also questions surrounding the discipline of the squad under Westley's management, as Stevenage received 14 red cards during the season, more than any other club in the league. A 2–0 defeat away to relegation-threatened Forest Green Rovers on the final day of the season meant that Stevenage failed to reach the play-offs, finishing sixth in the league table. Following this, Westley confirmed in May 2006 that he would leave the club when his contract expired in June, ending his three-and-a-half year tenure with the Hertfordshire club.

=== Rushden & Diamonds ===
Westley was appointed manager of Conference National club Rushden & Diamonds in December 2006, with the club placed 22nd in the league table, two points adrift of safety. Westley's first match in charge was a 1–0 victory away to Cambridge United on 26 December 2006. He signed several players whom he had previously managed at Stevenage, including Jamie Cook, David Perpetuini, and Dino Maamria. Westley also recruited Michael Bostwick and Chris Beardsley, younger players who he had previously written about in his weekly column in The Non-League Paper. The team recorded five consecutive victories in the league, including wins away at the top two teams in the league at the time, Oxford United and Dagenham & Redbridge. Westley was dismissed after a 2–2 draw at Aldershot Town in February 2007. He had taken the club from 22nd to 12th in the space of two-and-a-half months, and the team were on a seven-match unbeaten run at the time. Westley managed Rushden for 13 games, winning seven, drawing three, and losing three. No reasons were given for Westley's departure, and he was replaced two days later by Garry Hill.

=== Kettering Town ===
After leaving Rushden, Westley was appointed caretaker manager of Conference North club Kettering Town for the remainder of the 2006–07 season on 20 April 2007. His first match in charge was a 0–0 draw away to Stalybridge Celtic. Kettering finished the season in second place, and they were beaten on penalties by Farsley Celtic in the play-off semi-final following a 1–1 aggregate scoreline over two legs. He left Kettering when his short-term contract expired in May 2007, having managed the club for four games.

=== Return to Stevenage ===
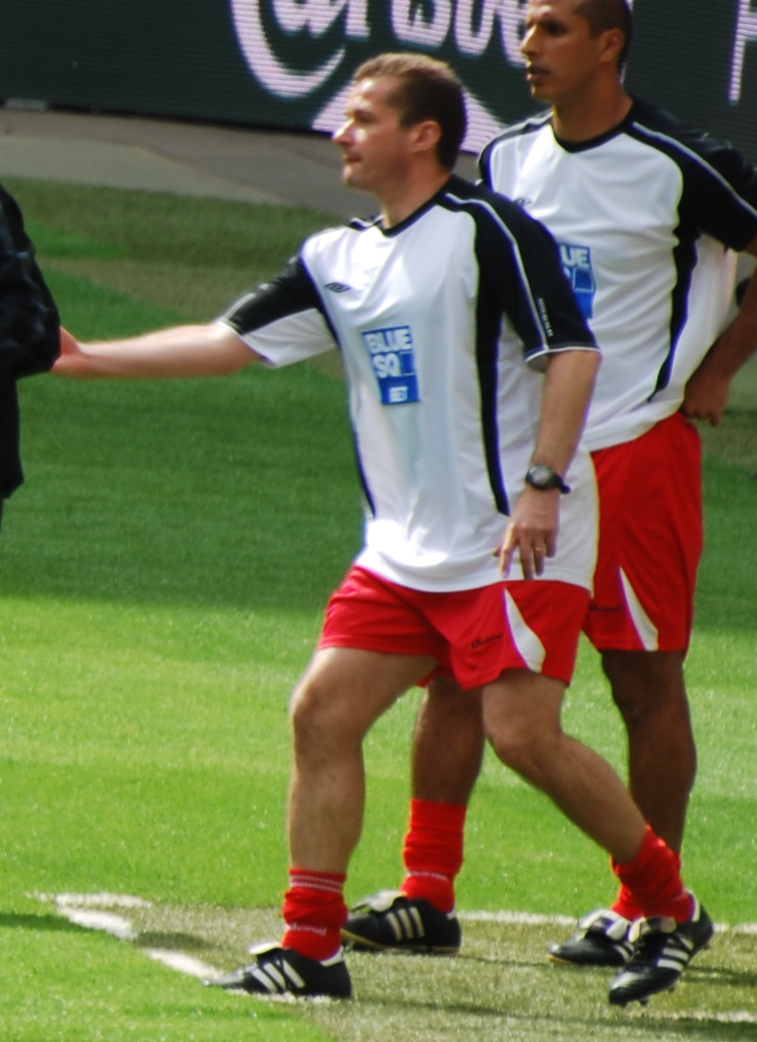
Westley managing Stevenage Borough in the 2009 FA Trophy final

After almost a year without work in football, Westley returned as manager of Stevenage on 2 May 2008, two years after his departure from the club. Upon his return, Westley stated he had come to "finish the job he started", referring to his ambition of guiding the club into the Football League for the first time in its history. He said that "the moment was right" for him to return to football management and that he "had some very good times at Stevenage before". His appointment was met with scepticism by some Stevenage supporters, but Westley promised to deliver a winning team. Westley began by overhauling the squad during the summer transfer window, bringing in 12 new players. Among those recruited were Gary Mills and David Bridges, both of whom Westley had managed during his time at Kettering. He also signed Michael Bostwick and Mark Albrighton, whom he had previously recruited at Rushden & Diamonds.

Stevenage began the season by losing three out of their first four games and conceding 13 goals in the process, including a 5–0 defeat to Wrexham on the first day of the season. During the first half of the 2008–09 season, the club struggled with the same inconsistency that had characterised Westley's first spell as manager, losing three consecutive matches in November, the last of which was a 2–1 home defeat to Wrexham; it would prove to be Stevenage's last defeat at Broadhall Way in the league for the next 18 months. Westley appointed former player Dino Maamria as first-team coach at the club. This, combined with several mid-season signings, including Chris Day, Mark Roberts, and Jon Ashton, contributed to an improvement in form during the second half of the season. A club-record 24-match unbeaten run, which lasted from December 2008 to April 2009, ensured that Stevenage qualified for the Conference Premier play-offs, finishing in the last play-off position. Despite holding a 3–1 lead going into the second leg, Stevenage lost 4–3 on aggregate to Cambridge United. The club won the FA Trophy that season, defeating York City 2–0 in the final at Wembley Stadium. The victory marked Westley's first managerial honour with Stevenage. Following the match, he signed a one-year contract extension.

"When you've put as much work in as we have over the last couple of years to build a team, to build a successful squad, to see it come to fruition is fantastic."

— Graham Westley, on Stevenage securing promotion to the Football League in April 2010.

Stevenage started the 2009–10 season by recording just one win from their first five matches. Following a 2–1 defeat to Oxford United in August 2009, the team embarked on a 17-match unbeaten run from August to December 2009, ascending into the top two positions. Unlike in previous seasons, the club performed strongly away from home, securing victories against promotion rivals Luton Town and Mansfield Town. A 4–1 victory against Cambridge United on New Year's Day saw Stevenage positioned in first place in the league table for the first time that season. Two away defeats within the space of a week in February allowed rivals Oxford United to establish an eight-point lead going into March 2010. Stevenage responded by winning eight consecutive games, including a 1–0 victory over Oxford United in late March, subsequently overtaking them at the top of the table.

Stevenage earned promotion to the Football League with two games to spare following a 2–0 victory against Kidderminster Harriers at Aggborough on 17 April 2010. The team won their last six league games without conceding a goal, recording 42 points from a possible 45 across their last 15 league fixtures. Stevenage finished the season having amassed 99 points from 44 games, winning the league by 11 points. The promotion meant Westley had led Stevenage to the Football League for the first time in their history, as well as managing a Football League team for the first time in his managerial career. Westley also guided the club to another FA Trophy final, this time losing 2–1 after extra-time against Barrow at Wembley Stadium. At the end of the season, Westley signed a new two-year contract, keeping him contracted to the club until 2012. On signing the new deal, Westley stated: "I am grateful for all the support that we have all been given in the past two years. I am delighted to have the opportunity to manage the launch of the club into the Football League". In his first two seasons back at the club, from May 2008 to May 2010, Westley was in charge for 114 games, recording 70 victories and a win percentage of 61.40%.

In a manner similar to the previous season, but in contrast to his first spell at the club, the 2010–11 season saw five players join the club, while five others departed during the close season. The club began the season inconsistently, with Westley stating the season would be a "massive learning curve" for both himself and the players. Following four defeats in six matches during December 2010 and January 2011, Stevenage were placed 18th in League Two, four points above the relegation places. Throughout February and March 2011, Stevenage won nine out of eleven matches, moving into the play-off positions. This included six consecutive victories, a sequence matched only by Bury that season. A 3–3 draw against Bury on the final day of the season meant that Stevenage finished in sixth place. They faced fifth-placed Accrington Stanley in the 2010–11 League Two play-off semi-finals, winning both legs by a 3–0 aggregate scoreline. They defeated Torquay United 1–0 in the final at Old Trafford on 28 May 2011. The victory meant that Westley had guided the club to back-to-back promotions, achieving promotion to League One for the first time in the club's history. Westley said: "It's a fantastic feeling. The players work so hard and they deserve everything they get". During the 2010–11 season, Westley also guided the club to the fourth round of the FA Cup, where they lost to Reading 2–1. In the previous round, Stevenage defeated Premier League club Newcastle United 3–1 at Broadhall Way. After the match, Westley stated that prior to the game, he had told the players to "go out and win the match 5–0. We established that if we did just 20% of what it would take to win 5–0 then we would still win the game".

At the start of the 2011–12 season, Westley signed a three-year contract extension at Stevenage, which kept him contracted to the club until 2014. Westley acquired five players on free transfers, while also releasing five members of the existing squad. Stevenage were positioned just outside the play-off places after securing a 5–1 victory against Sheffield Wednesday at Broadhall Way in September 2011. The club also inflicted Charlton Athletic's first league defeat of the season after a 1–0 win against the league leaders. The victory against Charlton served as the catalyst for a 13-match unbeaten, and a 6–1 away victory at Colchester United on Boxing Day 2011 meant the club moved into sixth place, occupying the final play-off position. After three-and-a-half years in charge, Westley left Stevenage in January 2012 to join fellow League One club Preston North End. His final game as manager of Stevenage was a 1–0 away victory at Reading in the FA Cup third round.

=== Preston North End ===
In January 2012, Preston North End asked for permission to speak to Westley with the view to appointing him as their new manager. Although the Hertfordshire club described the approach as "unwelcome", permission was granted. After personal terms and a compensation package were agreed, Westley was appointed Preston's new manager on 13 January 2012. His first match in charge of the club was a 2–0 home defeat to Leyton Orient on 21 January 2012. He earned his first victory in his fourth match in charge, securing a 1–0 home win over Hartlepool United on 14 February 2012. Following Preston's 2–0 televised defeat to Sheffield Wednesday on 31 March 2012, Westley stated that a Sheffield Wednesday player had informed him that four Preston players had leaked the Preston team and tactics to the opposition ahead of the match. Westley stated: "It doesn't surprise me. When you have got people in your own camp working against you it is tough". Preston won just two of their remaining 17 matches, finishing the season in 15th place. At the end of the season, Westley criticised the club's "mediocre" mentality, stating the squad had "not got a clue what it takes to get success".

Westley overhauled the playing squad ahead of the 2012–13 season; Preston announced that 21 players would be leaving the club, 14 of whom were released at the end of their contracts, while a further seven were transfer-listed. Preston signed 18 players during the summer transfer window, including Scott Laird, John Mousinho, Joel Byrom, and Chris Beardsley, four players from Westley's former club, Stevenage. Westley stated a desire for the new group of players to be committed to his ideas. Preston started the season by defeating Championship club Huddersfield Town 2–0 at Deepdale in the League Cup. Later on in the month, the team secured consecutive 4–1 home victories, beating Crystal Palace and Swindon Town respectively, and also defeated Hartlepool United 5–0 a month later. After this, the club won just two league matches in four months, from October 2012 to February 2013. A day after Preston's 3–1 away defeat to Yeovil Town on 12 February 2013, the club released a statement announcing Westley had been sacked. With Preston sitting five points above the relegation zone, "the board felt that a change of manager was the only way forward". Reflecting on his time at Preston, Westley stated he had to "slash the wage bill by 60 percent", and as a result the "re-building was well underway but the club lost confidence in me whilst I was doing it. They just want results. Short-term pain is necessary sometimes. It was necessary at Preston. And the fans got restless. I get that. Just as managers have to be brave enough to grit their teeth and face up to that, so owners have to be brave at difficult times. And they have to be able to understand the issues. I knew the answers to problems but I wasn't being allowed to solve all the problems".

=== Third spell at Stevenage ===
After a month out of work, Westley rejoined Stevenage on 30 March 2013, marking his third spell as manager at the club. On the appointment, Stevenage chairman Phil Wallace stated: "Graham was keen to come back to Stevenage and, although I met some strong candidates, without doubt I think he's the best man for the job right now. The club enjoyed a great deal of success before he left last year and we moved forwards significantly in his time here on several levels". On his return, Westley commented: "I'm really happy to be back, the training ground is fantastic, the club just keeps moving forward. All the facilities keep improving and I hope that I can come back and make another positive difference". In his first match back in charge, Stevenage secured a 1–0 victory over Hartlepool United on 1 April 2013. Stevenage ended the 2012–13 season in 18th place, after which Westley released four players and placed a further three on the transfer list.

He signed seven players in preparation for the 2013–14 season, and further strengthened the squad by signing striker François Zoko in September 2013. However, the team did not recover from a poor start to the season, and despite a late six-match unbeaten run, they ended the season in last place and were consequently relegated to League Two, finishing eight points adrift of safety. Westley responded by releasing nine players, while a further four were sold. Westley was forced to largely rebuild the squad for the 2014–15 season, and brought in 15 new signings. He guided the team to play-off qualification with a sixth-place finish, before they were beaten by Southend United 4–2 on aggregate in the semi-finals, having conceded two goals in extra-time of the second leg fixture at Roots Hall. Westley was replaced as manager by former England striker Teddy Sheringham on 21 May 2015.

=== Peterborough United ===
After travelling to the United States to meet with Peterborough United chairman Darragh MacAnthony, Westley was appointed manager of the League One club on 21 September 2015. He was named League One Manager of the Month for November 2015 after Peterborough earned 12 points and scored 14 goals from four league matches, receiving praise for the team's open and attacking style of play. Having initially moved into the play-off places in January 2016, Peterborough were in 14th place following a 2–0 defeat to Scunthorpe United at London Road on 23 April 2016, and Westley was subsequently sacked later that day.

=== Newport County ===
Westley was appointed manager of League Two club Newport County on 7 October 2016, following the dismissal of Warren Feeney. Despite Westley criticising his players with some "harsh words", stating he was "not prepared to tolerate that sort of rubbish anymore", Newport went on to lose eight successive games, which Westley described as "embarrassing" and "humiliating". Club secretary Graham Bean resigned in December, stating: "Graham Westley is an impossible man to work with... he needs to learn some manners and start treating people with some respect". He signed 14 players during the January transfer window, a move he admitted was a "short-term risk". However, he failed to arrest the team's decline and was dismissed on 9 March 2017 with Newport 11 points adrift at the bottom of League Two. The club's board stated that they had consulted both fans and the players over their decision to dismiss Westley; he had been confronted by irate supporters at Rodney Parade. Following his departure, transfer-listed midfielder Mark Randall stated he had been "treated quite unfairly" by Westley. Caretaker-manager Michael Flynn subsequently oversaw an unlikely escape from relegation, guiding the team to seven victories in the final 12 matches of the 2016–17 season.

Westley maintained that his strategy had played a key part in Newport's survival, stating: "If you go back to the AGM just after the turn of the year, Newport were rooted to the bottom of the Football League and I was very clear there was one way out of it — turning the whole squad over in January. I put together a team to function on the bog of a pitch that was Rodney Parade and my strategy is what kept that club in the Football League. Yes, it happened under Flynny's management but I think anyone who is honest would say I did a very good job in working out a way of surviving and building a squad that would win the games at home to keep them in the League".

=== Barnet ===
Westley was appointed head coach of League Two club Barnet on 15 January 2018. Barnet chairman Anthony Kleanthous stated that the appointment had come to fruition after Westley had been recommended to him by Peterborough United director of football, Barry Fry. Despite his previous ties with local rivals Stevenage, Westley had been identified as a "high-impact manager" capable of reversing Barnet's fortunes, with the club sitting at the bottom of League Two at the time of his appointment. He joined Barnet on a rolling contract. Westley's first match in charge was a 1–1 draw with Lincoln City on 20 January 2018. He was sacked by Barnet on 19 March 2018, two months into his tenure, and was immediately replaced by Martin Allen. Barnet won two matches out of 11 with Westley in charge, drawing four and losing five.

=== Fourth spell at Stevenage ===
Westley returned to Stevenage for a fourth time on 15 December 2019, four and a half years after his previous spell as manager of the club. He signed a contract until the end of the 2019–20 season, with the club positioned in 23rd place in League Two at the time of his appointment. Westley officially commenced the role on 23 December 2019, and the club signed nine players during the January transfer window. Having won two of his 15 matches as manager, Westley resigned on 16 February 2020 with Stevenage in 24th place, seven points adrift at the bottom of League Two.

== Personal life ==
Westley wrote a weekly column in The Non-League Paper, sharing his views and experiences on the non-League game. He is the chief executive of the Aimita Corporation, an organisation that provides performance management consulting. Westley also holds a Master of Arts degree in company direction. Westley's son, Joe, is also a footballer.

== Statistics ==
=== Playing statistics ===
Club	Season	Division	League		Cup		Total	
Club	Season	Division	Apps	Goals	Apps	Goals	Apps	Goals
Queens Park Rangers	1985–86	First Division	0	0	0	0	0	0
Gillingham	1985–86	Third Division	1	0	0	0	1	0
Gillingham	1986–87	Third Division	1	0	1	0	2	0
Gillingham	Total		2	0	1	0	3	0
Barnet	1987–88	Conference	3	1	0	0	3	1
Aylesbury United	1992–93	Isthmian League Premier Division	23	18	5	2	28	20

=== Managerial statistics ===
As of match played 15 February 2020

Managerial record by team and tenure
Team	From	To	Record					Ref.
Team	From	To	P	W	D	L	Win %	Ref.
Kingstonian	29 December 1996	10 May 1997	25	9	8	8	36.0	
Enfield	26 September 1997	30 May 1998	41	19	6	16	46.3	
Farnborough Town	2 August 1999	28 January 2003	197	108	34	55	54.8	
Stevenage Borough	29 January 2003	30 June 2006	164	79	36	49	48.2	
Rushden & Diamonds	18 December 2006	25 February 2007	15	8	3	4	53.3	
Kettering Town (caretaker)	20 April 2007	1 May 2007	4	0	3	1	0.0	
Stevenage	2 May 2008	12 January 2012	201	109	49	43	54.2	
Preston North End	13 January 2012	13 February 2013	62	16	23	23	25.8	
Stevenage	30 March 2013	21 May 2015	112	38	25	49	33.9	
Peterborough United	21 September 2015	23 April 2016	41	18	6	17	43.9	
Newport County	10 October 2016	9 March 2017	29	6	9	14	20.7	
Barnet	15 January 2018	19 March 2018	11	2	4	5	18.2	
Stevenage	23 December 2019	16 February 2020	15	2	3	10	13.3	
Total			919	414	211	294	45.0	

== Honours ==
Farnborough Town

- Isthmian League Cup: 2000–01
- Isthmian League Premier Division: 2000–01

Stevenage

- Football League Two play-offs: 2011
- Conference Premier: 2009–10
- FA Trophy: 2008–09; runner-up: 2009–10

Individual

- Conference Premier Manager of the Month: October 2005, January 2009, January 2010
- Football League One Manager of the Month: November 2015
