= 2011–12 Stevenage F.C. season =

Stevenage
2011–12 season
- Chairman: Phil Wallace
- Manager: Graham Westley (until 13 January); Mark Roberts (caretaker, until 25 Jan); Gary Smith (from 25 January)
- League One: 6th
- FA Cup: Fifth round
- League Cup: First Round
- Top goalscorer: League: Scott Laird (8); All: Chris Beardsley (10)
- Highest home attendance: 6,625 (v Tottenham Hotspur, FA Cup, 19 February 2012)
- Lowest home attendance: 2,414 (v Peterborough United, League Cup, 9 August 2011)

The 2011–12 season was Stevenage F.C.'s second season in the Football League, where the club competed in League One. This article shows statistics of the club's players in the season, and also lists all matches that the club played during the season. Their sixth-place finish and subsequent successful play-off campaign meant it was Stevenage's first ever season of playing in League One, having only spent one season in League Two. The season started out as the third year in charge for manager Graham Westley during his second spell at the club; having previously managed the Hertfordshire side from 2003 to 2006. However, Westley left Stevenage in January 2012, and joined fellow League One side Preston North End. The vacant managerial position was filled by former Colorado Rapids manager Gary Smith, signing a contract until 2014.

Ahead of the club's first season in League One, Westley adopted the same "five in, five out" transfer policy as he had done for the two previous seasons. Strikers Yemi Odubade and Charlie Griffin were the first to leave having been loaned out for much of the previous campaign, joining Conference National sides Gateshead and Forest Green Rovers respectively. Second choice goalkeeper Ashley Bayes opted to leave the club in order to play first-team football at Conference South club Basingstoke Town. Luke Foster and David Bridges also opted to leave Stevenage ahead of the season, both on free transfers, with Foster signing for Rotherham United, and Bridges for his former club, Kettering Town. Stevenage's first signing of the season was striker Guy Madjo, who joined on a free transfer from Albanian Superliga side KS Bylis Ballsh. Former Stevenage goalkeeper Alan Julian re-joined the club following his release by Gillingham, while Phil Edwards rejected a contract extension at Accrington Stanley in order to join the Hertfordshire club on a free transfer. Midfielders Jennison Myrie-Williams and Robin Shroot also signed on free transfers following successful trial periods with the club. In terms of transfers during the 2011–12 campaign, striker Don Cowan joined the club from Longford Town for an undisclosed fee in August 2011, and winger Luke Freeman signed from Arsenal in January 2012, after a successful three-month loan spell with the club. Strikers Byron Harrison and Guy Madjo both departed in January 2012, signing for League Two sides AFC Wimbledon and Aldershot Town for respective undisclosed fees.

Stevenage started their first ever League One campaign brightly, losing just one of their first eight League One fixtures, as well as securing a notable 5–1 home victory over Sheffield Wednesday. However, a run of four successive defeats moved Stevenage into the lower half of the league. A 1–0 victory over then-unbeaten league leaders, Charlton Athletic, would ultimately serve as the catalyst for an eleven-game unbeaten run, which included a 6–1 away win at Colchester United. The run had propelled Stevenage onto the edge of the play-off places. Following Westley's departure to Preston, captain Mark Roberts took caretaker charge of the club, winning two games out of three, including another large victory away from home, this time against Rochdale. New manager Gary Smith took charge of his first league game, away at Sheffield Wednesday in February 2012, securing a 1–0 victory. Sitting in the play-off places with a number of games in hand, Stevenage went on to win just one league game out of the following thirteen, although nine of which were draws. The poor run of form left Stevenage in ninth position, and six points behind the play-off places with just five games remaining. A run of four wins out of their last five matches, two of which against play-off rivals Carlisle United and Brentford, and another a 6–0 away win against Yeovil Town, meant that Stevenage ended up securing the final play-off spot on goal difference — following a 3–0 home victory against Bury on the last day of the season. Stevenage played third placed Sheffield United over two legs in the play-off semi-finals, losing 1–0 on aggregate.

Stevenage also competed in three cup competitions during the season. They fell at the first hurdle in both the League Cup and Football League Trophy, losing at home to Championship side Peterborough United in the League Cup, as well as suffering a penalty defeat away to AFC Wimbledon in the Football League Trophy. Despite the early cup disappointment, Stevenage were to make history in the FA Cup, reaching the fifth round for the first time in their history. After disposing of Hartlepool United and non-league Stourbridge away, Stevenage beat Championship club Reading at the Madejski Stadium. A 1–0 victory in their first home game of the competition against fellow League One side Notts County lined up a fifth-round home tie with Premier League side Tottenham Hotspur. The two sides played out a 0–0 draw at Broadhall Way, with Tottenham winning the subsequent replay at White Hart Lane.

Striker Chris Beardsley finished as Stevenage's top goalscorer for the season with ten goals in all competitions. Captain Mark Roberts played every single minute of Stevenage's 56 matches during the season. Roberts ended up winning the Player of the Year award for the season, with Michael Bostwick winning Players' Player of the Year.

== Squad details ==
Last updated on 14 May 2012. The squad at the end of the season.

=== Players information ===
No.	Name	Nationality	Position	Date of birth (age)	Signed From	Notes
Goalkeepers
1	Alan Julian	(Northern Ireland)	GK	11 March 1983 (age 43)	Gillingham	
16	Chris Day	(England)	GK	28 July 1975 (age 51)	Millwall	
Defenders
3	Scott Laird	(England)	LB	15 May 1988 (age 38)	Plymouth Argyle	
4	Darius Charles	(England)	LB	10 December 1987 (age 38)	Ebbsfleet United	
5	Jon Ashton	(England)	CB	4 October 1982 (age 44)	Grays Athletic	
14	Mark Roberts (c)	(England)	CB	16 October 1983 (age 43)	Northwich Victoria	
25	Ronnie Henry	(England)	RB	20 January 1984 (age 42)	Dublin City	
30	Jamaal Lascelles	(England)	RB	11 November 1993 (age 33)	Nottingham Forest (loan)	
Midfielders
2	Lawrie Wilson	(England)	RM	11 September 1987 (age 39)	Colchester United	
7	Darren Murphy	(Republic of Ireland)	CM	28 July 1985 (age 41)	Cork City	
8	Stacy Long	(England)	CM	11 January 1985 (age 41)	Ebbsfleet United	
11	Jennison Myrie-Williams	(England)	LM	17 May 1988 (age 38)	St Johnstone	
13	Joel Byrom	(England)	CM	14 September 1986 (age 40)	Northwich Victoria	
21	John Mousinho	(England)	CM	30 April 1986 (age 40)	Wycombe Wanderers	
23	Rob Sinclair	(England)	RM	29 August 1989 (age 37)	Salisbury City	
24	Michael Bostwick	(England)	CM	17 May 1988 (age 38)	Ebbsfleet United	
32	Robin Shroot	(Northern Ireland)	RM	26 March 1988 (age 38)	Birmingham City	
Forwards
10	Craig Reid	(England)	FW	17 December 1985 (age 40)	Newport County	
15	Luke Freeman	(England)	FW	22 March 1992 (age 34)	Arsenal	
18	Don Cowan	(Republic of Ireland)	FW	16 November 1989 (age 36)	Longford Town	
19	Michael Thalassitis	(Cyprus)	FW	19 January 1993 (age 33)	N/A	
20	Chris Beardsley	(England)	FW	28 February 1984 (age 42)	Kettering Town	
27	Jordan Slew	(England)	FW	7 September 1992 (age 34)	Blackburn Rovers (loan)	
29	Patrick Agyemang	(Ghana)	FW	29 September 1980 (age 46)	Queens Park Rangers (loan)	

=== Management ===
- Manager: Gary Smith
- Assistant manager: Mark Newson
- Goalkeeping coach: Gary Phillips
- Fitness coach: Neil Withington
- Physiotherapist: Paul Dando

== Match results ==
=== Legend ===
Win	Draw	Loss

=== Pre-season ===
In June 2011, Stevenage announced that their pre–season campaign would consist of eight friendlies to open the 2011–12 season. Stevenage's first pre-season fixture was an away trip to Hitchin Town on 13 July, with the away side winning the match 1–0 courtesy of an 86th-minute strike from Chris Beardsley after Michael Thalassitis' initial shot had been saved. Trialists Jerome Federico and Robin Shroot also featured for Stevenage in the match as second-half substitutes. Four days later, Stevenage beat a Fulham XI side 1–0 at Broadhall Way. The home side opened the scoring with just ten minutes remaining, trialist Robin Shroot scoring at the back post after good work down the right wing from Stacy Long. Stevenage then travelled to Conference South side Dover Athletic on 19 July, losing 1–0 courtesy of a late Michael Corcoran penalty. New signing Phil Edwards had missed a second-half penalty for Stevenage, firing wide after Byron Harrison was fouled in the area. Manager Graham Westley again took the opportunity to look at a number of trialists — with Welling United's Jack Parkinson featuring in the first half of the match, whilst former Northampton Town midfielder Liam Davis played 79 minutes. Robin Shroot, who had featured in Stevenage's first two pre-season fixtures, played the whole match. Another defeat followed four days later as Stevenage lost 1–0 to an Arsenal XI side at Broadhall Way, a Chuks Aneke goal in the second-half separating the teams. Trialist Rohan Ricketts played 45 minutes for Stevenage, while Robin Shroot again featured as a second-half substitute — with the latter signing a two-year contract three days later. Stevenage lost their third consecutive pre-season friendly, again by a 1–0 scoreline, when they travelled to Conference South side Hampton & Richmond Borough on 26 July. The only goal of the game came just before half-time; a Stuart Duff shot took a deflection off of Phil Edwards, wrong-footing Alan Julian in the Stevenage goal. Two days later, Stevenage travelled to Carshalton Athletic — the friendly was arranged as part of the transfer that took Stevenage striker Byron Harrison from Carshalton to Broadhall Way. Stevenage won the match 3–0, with goals coming from Craig Reid, Guy Madjo, and Robin Shroot. A 2–1 win at League Two side Dagenham & Redbridge followed on 30 July. Michael Bostwick opened the scoring after just eight minutes, heading in at the back post. Stevenage captain Mark Roberts doubled Stevenage's lead on the hour mark, scoring from four yards out after Dagenham had failed to clear a corner. A late Brian Woodall goal served as a consolation for the home side. The club's final pre-season fixture took place on 2 August 2011 against Conference North side Corby Town, ending 1–1. Stevenage took the lead midway through the first-half, Ben May heading in a Stacy Long corner. Corby restored parity shortly after the interval, with Matt Rhead scoring from the penalty spot after Jennison Myrie-Williams fouled Nick Rogan.

Game	Date	Opponent	Venue	Result	Attendance	Goalscorers	Notes
1	13 July 2011	Hitchin Town	Away	1–0	674	Beardsley	
2	17 July 2011	Fulham XI	Home	1–0	786	Shroot	
3	19 July 2011	Dover Athletic	Away	0–1	453		
4	23 July 2011	Arsenal XI	Home	0–1	1,020		
5	26 July 2011	Hampton & Richmond Borough	Away	0–1	249		
6	28 July 2011	Carshalton Athletic	Away	3–0	285	Reid, Madjo, Shroot	
7	30 July 2011	Dagenham & Redbridge	Away	2–1	625	Bostwick, Roberts	
8	2 August 2011	Corby Town	Away	1–1	320	May	

- Note: Stevenage goals come first.

=== League One ===
The 2011–12 League One fixtures were released on 17 June 2011, with Stevenage opening their league campaign at home to Exeter City on 6 August 2011. The game ended 0–0, with both sides spurning a number of goalscoring opportunities. The result meant that Stevenage had drawn their opening league fixture for the third consecutive season. A week later, Stevenage drew 1–1 away at Chesterfield. Stevenage took the lead five minutes before the interval, Darius Charles heading in from close range after Michael Bostwick's looping header was guided towards goal. Bostwick was sent-off twenty minutes into the second-half, receiving a second bookable offence for a foul on Mark Allott. The home side equalised late on when Jack Lester headed in Dean Morgan's cross. Three days later, Stevenage earned their first win of the season, securing a 3–1 away victory against Bournemouth. Stevenage took the lead shortly before half-time, Craig Reid's quick turn and shot beating Shwan Jalal in the Bournemouth goal after Lawrie Wilson's threaded ball beat the offside trap. Two minutes after the interval, the home side were level, substitute Harry Arter scoring from Marc Pugh's squared pass. The away side took the lead once more with half an hour remaining, John Mousinho scoring from the penalty spot after Bournemouth captain Adam Barrett handled Stacy Long's shot on the line, receiving a red card in the process for denying a goalscoring opportunity. Stevenage doubled their advantage in injury-time when Chris Beardsley latched on to Scott Laird's pass and beat Jalal with a first time finish. Stevenage then drew 2–2 at home to Hartlepool United on 20 August, coming from two goals down to salvage a point. The visitors opened the scoring through Peter Hartley's headed goal from a corner ten minutes before the interval. Hartlepool doubled their lead just before half-time through an Adam Boyd penalty kick after Colin Nish was fouled in the area by Jon Ashton. With twenty minutes remaining, Byron Harrison scored his first goal of the season when he netted from six yards out. Scott Laird then restored parity with just two minutes remaining, heading in Robin Shroot's corner to ensure Stevenage earned a point. A week later, Stevenage lost their first league game of the season when they travelled to league leaders Milton Keynes Dons, losing 1–0 courtesy of a second-half goal from Charlie MacDonald.

Stevenage recorded their first home win of the season on 3 September, beating Rochdale 4–2 at Broadhall Way. The home side took the lead through Craig Reid, who collected Lawrie Wilson's knock down, before turning in the box and beating Rochdale goalkeeper Jake Kean. Rochdale captain Gary Jones equalised shortly after with a volley that found its way into the net through a crowd of players. Two minutes later, Stevenage were ahead once more — Chris Beardsley scoring from close range after Reid's shot had been parried out by Kean. Beardsley added his second of the game in first-half injury-time, turning on the edge of the area before curling the ball into the far corner of the goal to give the hosts a two-goal advantage going into the interval. Reid added Stevenage's fourth goal of the game when he poked the ball past the onrushing Kean. The goal was wrongly accredited as a Neal Trotman own goal, with there being "conclusive proof" that Reid made contact with the ball. The away side replied with their second of the match almost instantly, David Ball turning sharply before placing a shot that went in off of the post. A week later, Stevenage travelled to Oldham Athletic, earning a 1–1 draw. The visitors scored the opening goal after just four minutes — Joel Byrom's corner found Michael Bostwick on the edge of the area, and his shot was headed in by Mark Roberts. Ten minutes later, Oldham equalised through a Shefki Kuqi header to ensure the game ended with the scoreline tied. Three days after the draw at Oldham, Stevenage welcomed Sheffield Wednesday to Broadhall Way, winning the match 5–1. Stevenage took the lead after six minutes, Michael Bostwick's shot was fumbled by Wednesday goalkeeper Richard O'Donnell and Craig Reid was on hand to score from six yards out. The lead was doubled four minutes later, when Mousinho beat Rob Jones for pace before firing a 20 yard drive past O'Donnell. Seven minutes later, the home side were three goals ahead, Michael Bostwick's 25 yard shot rebounded off the post before nestling in the opposite corner of the goal. Shortly before the interval, Stevenage scored their fourth goal of the match — O'Donnell had saved Mousinho's shot well before the ball connected with the onrushing Lawrie Wilson, rebounding into the net. Darius Charles added a fifth goal for the home side in the second-half with a low finish from just inside the area after Lawrie Wilson had squared the ball across goal. Sheffield Wednesday added a consolation goal with fifteen minutes remaining through Gary Madine. The visitors were reduced to ten men late on when Jermaine Johnson received a straight red card for an off the ball incident with Scott Laird. Four days later, Stevenage lost their first home game of the campaign, losing 2–0 to Notts County. Craig Reid had missed a penalty for the home side in the first-half, before goals from Lee Hughes and Ben Burgess gave the visitors all three points. A week later, on 24 September, Stevenage lost their second successive game, losing 1–0 to Carlisle United at Brunton Park courtesy of a first-half Peter Murphy header.

A third consecutive defeat followed a week later, on 1 October, as Stevenage lost 2–1 to Scunthorpe United at Broadhall Way. Similarly to the club's last home defeat to Notts County, the visitors opened the scoring in first-half injury time, Eddie Nolan cutting in from the left and beating Chris Day from 20 yards out. Michael O'Connor doubled Scunthorpe's advantage in second-half injury time with a finish from an acute angle, before substitute Josh Walker scored two minutes later to half the deficit. Stevenage then lost 2–1 away to Huddersfield Town, a fourth straight defeat. Huddersfield opened the scoring just before half-time through Gary Roberts. Scott Laird briefly levelled the game with twenty minutes remaining, scoring with a shot from just inside the area after John Mousinho had played the ball into his path. The home side took the lead again shortly after, this time Lee Novak scoring after Anton Robinson's shot had hit the post. Mousinho missed a late penalty for Stevenage after Byron Harrison was fouled in the area. The four game losing streak ended a week later, on 15 October, when Stevenage beat Charlton Athletic 1–0, ending Charlton's unbeaten start to the season. The only goal of the game came eleven minutes into the match, former Charlton player Stacy Long saw his 25-yard shot take a deflection to wrongfoot goalkeeper Ben Hamer. Both sides went on to create further chances, with Leon Cort producing a save from Chris Day in the Stevenage goal, as well as Jon Ashton hitting the crossbar for the home side. A 0–0 draw against Yeovil Town followed a week later, with John Mousinho missing a penalty with ten minutes remaining. The penalty came about as a result of Yeovil's Luke Ayling handling the ball on the line, receiving a straight red card. There was a "great sense of injustice around the ground" as Mark Roberts scored the rebound after Ayling had handled — with the referee refusing to give Stevenage the advantage and instead opting to award the penalty. Three days after the draw, on 25 October, Stevenage travelled to Brentford, winning the match 1–0, their second away victory of the campaign. The only goal of the game came with twenty minutes left in the second-half; Chris Beardsley picking the ball up in the area before lashing a shot across the face of goal and into the net. Stevenage secured a second consecutive away victory in their following match, beating Bury 2–1 at Gigg Lane. Byron Harrison opened the scoring for the visitors in the first-half, sweeping home John Mousinho's knock down. Stevenage doubled their advantage with fifteen minutes remaining, Mark Roberts beating the offside trap to head in Joel Byrom's cross. Bury replied almost immediately, with Andy Bishop converting from the penalty spot after Lawrie Wilson had fouled Lenell John-Lewis.

The club's first fixture in November was a home game against Sheffield United, with Stevenage winning the match 2–1. The hosts took the lead shortly before half-time, with Mark Roberts scoring his second goal in as many games with a sharp swivel and finish after Craig Reid's corner was not cleared by the Sheffield United defence. The away side levelled when substitute Ched Evans scored with a low-drilled effort from a 20-yard free-kick. Stevenage had the chance to take the lead once again with just ten minutes remaining when Lawrie Wilson was fouled in the area, with Scott Laird duly converting the penalty. After a two-week break due to the FA Cup, Stevenage returned to league action with a trip to Leyton Orient. The game ended 0–0, with Stevenage's Joel Byrom coming closest to breaking the deadlock when his 20-yard shot hit the post. A second 0–0 draw followed a week later, on 26 November, when Stevenage hosted Walsall at Broadhall Way. Both Chuks Aneke and Luke Freeman made their home debuts for the club, with both having chances to win the match.

After a two-week break from the League due to FA Cup commitments, Stevenage travelled to Deepdale to face Preston North End on 10 December. The match ended 0–0, Stevenage's third straight stalemate. Second-half substitute's Darius Charles and Byron Harrison had the visitors' best chances, forcing Preston goalkeeper Thorsten Stuckmann to make two strong saves. Preston's Danny Mayor hit the post midway through the second period, before Iain Hume's volley was palmed away from the goal by an outstretched Chris Day, saving Stevenage a point in injury-time. A week later, on 17 December, Stevenage faced Tranmere Rovers at Broadhall Way in the club's last home game of 2011 — with Stevenage securing a 2–1 victory. The home side took the lead seven minutes before half-time, with Chris Beardsley swivelling in the area before scooping the ball into the far corner of the goal, although the striker was subsequently substituted immediately after as a result of picking up a hamstring injury in the build-up to the goal. Substitute Ben May was sent-off for the home side after "squaring up" to Tranmere goalkeeper Paul Rachubka with twenty minutes remaining. Despite the visitors having a one-man advantage, it was Stevenage who doubled the lead, Mark Roberts heading in Robin Shroot's cross to score his fifth goal of the campaign. Tranmere's Joss Labadie scored a consolation goal for the away side in the third minute of injury-time, scoring from the penalty spot after Scott Laird was adjudged to have brought down Mark McChrystal. Nine days later, Stevenage faced a Boxing Day away trip to Colchester United. Stevenage won the game 6–1, their biggest Football League victory to date. The visitors scored the opening goal within the first ten minutes, Don Cowan and Chris Beardsley linked up well before the latter provided a square pass to the onrushing Robin Shroot, who made no mistake from six yards out. Cowan then set-up Beardsley, who scored from 25-yards with a low drilled effort. After hitting the post and forcing Chris Day into making a number of saves, Colchester halved the deficit shortly after the interval when Karl Duguid's cross looped across the face of the goal and Ian Henderson's headed in from six yards. Stevenage restored their two-goal cushion ten minutes later, when Michael Bostwick picked up Phil Edwards' pass and saw his 30-yard shot take a deflection and wrong-foot Ben Williams in the Colchester goal. Seven minutes later, Stevenage scored their fourth goal from a well-worked free-kick — with Bostwick playing the ball to Scott Laird, who sidefooted the ball into the net from inside the area. Another goal followed just two minutes later, when Luke Freeman picked up Joel Byrom's pass, beat his man and lashed the ball across the goal with a "powerful strike". Byrom added a sixth goal with ten minutes remaining when he ran onto Ronnie Henry's header and calmly scored from just inside the area. Five days later, on 31 December, Stevenage won their third consecutive game when they beat Wycombe Wanderers 1–0 at Adams Park. The only goal of the game came with just eight minutes remaining, substitute Luke Freeman's left wing cross found Lawrie Wilson, who lashed the ball into the net with a first time finish from six yards out.

Stevenage's thirteen game unbeaten run ended on 2 January 2012, losing 1–0 at home to Leyton Orient thanks to a first-half strike from Lee Cook. Leyton Orient were reduced to ten men in the first-half, with Ben Chorley receiving a red card for an off-the-ball incident with Chris Beardsley. Stevenage substitute Chuks Aneke was also sent-off in the second half for a high-footed challenge. In the week prior to Stevenage's trip to Rochdale, speculation mounted as to whether Stevenage manager Graham Westley would remain at the club amidst interest from fellow League One side, Preston North End. Westley eventually joined Preston on 13 January, leaving the club after three-and-a-half years in charge. Westley took his back-room staff with him to Preston, meaning captain Mark Roberts was named as player-manager for the club's trip to Spotland on 14 January. The game ended 5–1 to Stevenage. Luke Freeman, playing his first game since signing for the club on a permanent basis, scored the opening goal when his shot squirmed under Rochdale goalkeeper Péter Kurucz. Shortly after the interval, Stevenage had doubled their advantage when Freeman beat his man down the left, before laying the ball to Chris Beardsley, who in-turn rolled the ball to the onrushing Lawrie Wilson, who scored with a first-time finish. Rochdale reduced the two-goal deficit when loanee Brett Ormerod finished well from Daniel Bogdanovic's driven cross. Stevenage restored their two-goal advantage almost instantly, Lawrie Wilson ran onto Mark Roberts' ball, before finishing neatly past Kurucz. Rochdale defender Joe Widdowson was given a second yellow card shortly after for a foul on Beardsley. Five minutes later, the visitors had a fourth goal, Freeman cut in from the right wing and unleashed a 25-yard drive into the top corner of the goal. Freeman was again involved in Stevenage's fifth goal, whipping in a cross from the left that Byrom side-footed home. Roberts remained in charge for the club's trip to Scunthorpe United a week later, on 21 January, with the game ending in a 1–1 draw. Scunthorpe took the lead shortly after the half-time interval, with Garry Thompson collecting a Mark Duffy long ball before firing into the net from 12-yards out. Substitutes Robin Shroot and Darius Charles combined to ensure Stevenage earned a point from the match, with Shroot bringing down Lawrie Wilson's cross into the path of Charles, who turned quickly to beat the outstretched Sam Slocombe from six yards. Stevenage returned to Broadhall Way three days later, after three successive away fixtures in all competitions, hosting Milton Keynes Dons. The away side took the lead after just two minutes, when former Stevenage loanee Jay O'Shea finished from close range after Chris Day had palmed away Adam Smith's cross. Stevenage drew level midway through the first-half following a neat interchange between Luke Freeman and Lawrie Wilson, with Freeman laying the ball off to Michael Bostwick, who unleashed a 25-yard strike into the bottom left corner of the goal. On the hour mark, MK Dons defender Mathias Doumbé was sent-off for a second bookable offence after bringing down Chris Beardsley on the edge of the area. Stevenage took the lead from the resulting free-kick, with Scott Laird heading in Freeman's cross. The hosts had doubled their advantage three minutes later, Freeman again supplying the cross that was met by the head of Darius Charles, who firmly headed past MK Dons goalkeeper David Martin. With five minutes remaining, MK Dons scored their second goal of the game, with O'Shea crossing the ball for substitute Tom Flanagan to head into the net from six yards. Stevenage restored their two-goal advantage almost instantly when Charles worked his way into the box before firing the ball across the face of the goal, which was turned in by MK Dons defender Gary MacKenzie.

The club's first scheduled game of February was an away trip to Notts County, who Stevenage had also played the week before in the FA Cup. However, the game was called off on 3 February, a day before the match, due to a frozen pitch. Stevenage's home fixtures against Oldham Athletic and Carlisle United, scheduled to be played within the space of four days, on 7 February and 11 February respectively, were also postponed due to a frozen pitch after the playing surface was deemed to be unplayable ahead of each game. The club travelled to Sheffield Wednesday on 14 February, manager Gary Smith's first league game in-charge, winning the game 1–0 at Hillsborough. The only goal of the game came shortly before the interval, Joel Byrom's corner was met by Chris Beardsley, whose header was ultimately turned in by Scott Laird. Stevenage then faced Notts County at Meadow Lane on 22 February, losing 1–0 courtesy of a late Jeff Hughes strike. Another defeat followed three days later, with the club losing 2–0 to league leaders Charlton Athletic at The Valley. Charlton took the lead shortly after the interval, defender Michael Morrison opened the scoring with a half volley from the edge of the area. Striker Bradley Wright-Phillips doubled Charlton's advantage with a deflected effort. Three days later, on 28 February, Stevenage faced fourth placed Huddersfield Town at Broadhall Way, drawing 2–2. The hosts were without first-team regulars Jon Ashton, Chris Beardsley, Luke Freeman, and John Mousinho, and goalkeeper Chris Day was forced off with a shoulder injury at half-time. Huddersfield took the lead shortly after the interval, Lee Novak slid in Danny Ward, who finished from an acute angle. The away side doubled their advantage just five minutes later, Novak scoring from 20-yards courtesy of a powerful strike. Stevenage reduced the deficit with twenty minutes left when Joel Byrom's corner found the head of Michael Bostwick, whose powerful header beat Alex Smithies in the Huddersfield goal. The hosts then had the opportunity to draw level after Wilson was fouled in the area by Sean Morrison, although Scott Laird saw his subsequent penalty saved by Smithies. With just two minutes remaining, Stevenage equalised. Substitute Jennison Myrie-Williams found space on the left wing, and fired the ball across goal, reaching fellow substitute Robin Shroot, who finished from a tight angle to ensure Stevenage earned a valuable point.

The club faced Exeter City at St James' Park on 3 March, drawing 1–1. Exeter opened the scoring after fifteen minutes through Richard Logan, before Stevenage equalised on the hour mark — Robin Shroot scoring his second goal in as many games as he finished neatly from substitute Jennison Myrie-Williams' cross. A third successive draw followed a week later when Stevenage drew 2–2 at home with Chesterfield. The visitors opened the scoring after twelve minutes when Neal Trotman headed in Drew Talbot's cross. Chesterfield doubled their advantage ten minutes later when Jordan Bowery capitalised a defensive mix-up to curl in a shot from the edge of the area. Stevenage scored two goals within the space of two second-half minutes to draw level. Firstly, Scott Laird prodded home Joel Byrom's corner to half the deficit, before Laird fired in a cross that was neatly turned in by Craig Reid. Stevenage then faced a home game against Oldham Athletic on 13 March. The original game, scheduled to be played in February, was postponed due to adverse weather conditions. Stevenage won the game 1–0, courtesy of an injury-time header from Lawrie Wilson. Wilson connected with a low Darius Charles cross in the last minute of the match to give the home side their first league win in five outings. The club travelled to Victoria Park to face Hartlepool United four days later, playing out a 0–0 draw. Another 0–0 draw followed three days later, on 20 March, as Stevenage played out a goalless draw against Colchester United at Broadhall Way. Stevenage played the second-half with ten men, after striker Jordan Slew was sent-off just before the interval for "lashing out" at Colchester midfielder Anthony Wordsworth. An away trip to the Bescot Stadium to play Walsall on 24 March followed, ending in a 1–1 draw. The home side took an early lead when Walsall defender Andy Butler turned in area and found the bottom right hand corner of the goal. Stevenage equalised on the hour mark, Jennison Myrie-Williams made room down the left wing, before his attempted cross was blocked, the ball fell into the path of Michael Bostwick who curled the ball into the net from 25 yards out. A seventh draw in eight games was played out three days later, with Stevenage drawing 2–2 at home with Bournemouth. All four goals came in the first half of the match, with Bournemouth taking a two-goal lead before two Stevenage goals within the space of seven minutes meant the teams went into the break level. The visitors opened the scoring through Wesley Thomas' half volley that found the top right corner of the goal. Bournemouth then doubled their advantage when Scott Malone made a bursting run from full back before hitting a rasping drive that found the net from the edge of the area. The hosts were looking second best, but reduced the two-goal deficit when Luke Freeman cut in from the left and curled a right footed shot past Bournemouth goalkeeper Darryl Flahavan from 25 yards. Michael Bostwick scored his second goal in as many games with a low struck effort from the edge of the area, ensuring the two sides went in level at the interval. Another draw followed when Stevenage drew 1–1 at home to Wycombe Wanderers. Stevenage took the lead with just ten minutes remaining, Michael Bostwick scoring his third goal in as many games when he made room for himself outside the area after a neat interchange with Scott Laird, before curling an effort that beat Nikki Bull in the Wycombe goal. The away side equalised deep into injury-time when Mark Roberts was adjudged to have halted Craig Eastmond's run into the area illegally; Grant Basey stepped up and converted the resultant penalty.

Stevenage's nine game unbeaten run was ended on 6 April, losing 3–0 away to Tranmere Rovers courtesy of two early goals from on loan striker Jake Cassidy, and a second-half strike from Lucas Akins. Three days later, on 9 April, Stevenage welcomed Preston North End to Broadhall Way, signalling the return of former manager Graham Westley, who left Stevenage in January 2012 to take up the vacant position at Deepdale. The game ended 1–1, stretching Stevenage's winless run to seven league games. Preston took the lead with just four minutes remaining, with substitute Iain Hume sliding the ball in from six yards out following Danny Mayor's through ball. Stevenage then equalised in the fourth minute of injury time, with captain Mark Roberts heading in Michael Bostwick's floated cross to ensure a share of the spoils. The result meant that Stevenage were in ninth position, six points away from the final play-off place with just six games remaining. Stevenage travelled to in-form Yeovil Town five days after the draw with Preston, looking to secure a first away win in just under two months. Stevenage won the match 6–0, recording their biggest Football League victory to date, as well as recording the joint biggest away victory of 2011–12 League One campaign. Stevenage took an early lead in the match when Patrick Agyemang was played into the area by Craig Reid, Agyemang then squared the ball across goal for Luke Freeman to score from close range. Yeovil were reduced to ten men when Michael Woods fouled Michael Bostwick. Agyemang scored Stevenage's second goal when he collected Jamaal Lascelles long pass, before calmly beating Sam Walker in the Yeovil goal. Two goals within the space of three second half minutes put the game beyond doubt, with Jon Ashton and Lascelles scoring headers from set pieces. Mark Roberts added a fifth goal with ten minutes remaining — prodding in Freeman's centre. Freeman then scored his second, and Stevenage's sixth, when Jordan Slew made room down the right wing after a neat interchange with Agyemang, before finding Freeman at the back post to tap in from six yards out. The club then welcomed play-off rivals Carlisle United to Broadhall Way, knowing that a defeat would virtually end the club's play-off hopes. Stevenage dominated the first-half, but were unable to take an advantage into the interval. The second half was a much more even affair, with both teams spurning goalscoring opportunities. The deadlock was broken with just fifteen minutes remaining, substitute John Mousinho, returning from a six-month injury lay-off, latched onto Stacy Long's chipped through ball, before crashing the ball into the goal off the crossbar. Four days later, on 21 April, Stevenage hosted another team hoping to snatch the final play-off place when Brentford travelled to Broadhall Way. Stevenage secured a 2–1 victory, consequently ending Brentford's play-off hopes in the process. The visitors had the opportunity to take the lead on the half hour mark when Jamaal Lascelles was adjudged to have pushed Clinton Morrison in the area. However, Clayton Donaldson's penalty rebounded off the crossbar and Stevenage were able to clear to ensure the teams went in level at half-time. Brentford were then handed another chance from the penalty spot five minutes after the interval, this time the referee deemed Jon Ashton to have fouled Morrison. Brentford's Sam Saunders stepped up and his powerful penalty rebounded off the post and into the arms of Chris Day. Just three minutes after the second penalty miss, Stevenage were one goal to the good. Craig Reid controlled Lawrie Wilson's low cross, before hitting a shot on the turn that bounced off the ground and past Brentford goalkeeper Simon Moore. Luke Freeman then doubled Stevenage's advantage ten minutes later, dispossessing Adam Thompson before cutting in and hitting a right-footed shot that crashed into the goal off the post. Saunders reduced the deficit in injury-time with a curling free-kick, although Stevenage held on to secure a vital victory. The third straight victory, coupled with Notts County's home loss to Bury, meant that Stevenage were back in the play-off places with just two games remaining. Stevenage then travelled to Bramall Lane to face Sheffield United in a game that was televised live on Sky Sports on 28 April, and attracted a crowd of over 30,000 spectators. The game was an evening kick-off, meaning Stevenage had moved down to seventh in the league table as a result of Notts County's 4–3 win at Wycombe Wanderers earlier in the day. The game ended 2–2, with Stevenage taking a two-goal lead through strikes from Joel Byrom and Scott Laird, before Sheffield United's Richard Cresswell and Matthew Lowton restored parity. The draw meant that Stevenage had regained their place in sixth with just one game remaining.

Similarly to the 2010–11 campaign, Stevenage faced Bury at home for the final game of the regular season. The team knew that a win against Bury would secure a place in the play-offs, irrespective of what both play-off rivals, Notts County and Carlisle United, did in their respective games. Stevenage won the match 3–0, opening the scoring midway through the first-half when Craig Reid quickly controlled Luke Freeman's left wing cross before striking the ball high into the roof of the net. News at half-time filtered around the stadium that Notts County were comfortably beating their opponents, Colchester United, and therefore nothing more than a win would suffice if Stevenage were to secure sixth place. Nerves were settled with ten minutes remaining when Robin Shroot was fouled in the area, and Joel Byrom stepped up to convert the spot-kick and double Stevenage's advantage. A third goal was added in injury-time when Shroot broke through the centre of midfield, before laying the ball out to substitute Chris Beardsley, who lashed in a shot at the near post that Bury goalkeeper Jonathan Bond could only get a hand to.

Game	Date	Opponent	Venue	Result	Attendance	Goalscorers	Notes
1	6 August 2011	Exeter City	Home	0–0	3,829		
2	13 August 2011	Chesterfield	Away	1–1	5,836	Charles	
3	16 August 2011	Bournemouth	Away	3–1	5,574	Reid, Mousinho (pen), Beardsley	
4	20 August 2011	Hartlepool United	Home	2–2	2,831	Harrison, Laird	
5	27 August 2011	Milton Keynes Dons	Away	0–1	8,128		
6	3 September 2011	Rochdale	Home	4–2	3,021	Reid (2), Beardsley (2)	
7	10 September 2011	Oldham Athletic	Away	1–1	3,402	Roberts	
8	13 September 2011	Sheffield Wednesday	Home	5–1	4,339	Reid, Mousinho, Bostwick, Wilson, Charles	
9	17 September 2011	Notts County	Home	0–2	3,434		
10	24 September 2011	Carlisle United	Away	0–1	4,063		
11	1 October 2011	Scunthorpe United	Home	1–2	2,957	Walker	
12	8 October 2011	Huddersfield Town	Away	1–2	12,890	Laird	
13	15 October 2011	Charlton Athletic	Home	1–0	4,724	Long	
14	22 October 2011	Yeovil Town	Home	0–0	3,036		
15	25 October 2011	Brentford	Away	1–0	4,771	Beardsley	
16	29 October 2011	Bury	Away	2–1	2,683	Harrison, Roberts	
17	5 November 2011	Sheffield United	Home	2–1	4,996	Roberts, Laird (pen)	
18	19 November 2011	Leyton Orient	Away	0–0	4,862		
19	26 November 2011	Walsall	Home	0–0	3,140		
20	10 December 2011	Preston North End	Away	0–0	9,425		
21	17 December 2011	Tranmere Rovers	Home	2–1	3,376	Beardsley, Roberts	
22	26 December 2011	Colchester United	Away	6–1	5,276	Shroot, Beardsley, Bostwick, Laird, Freeman, Byrom	
23	31 December 2011	Wycombe Wanderers	Away	1–0	4,942	Wilson	
24	2 January 2012	Leyton Orient	Home	0–1	5,351		
25	14 January 2012	Rochdale	Away	5–1	2,367	Freeman (2), Wilson (2), Byrom	
26	21 January 2012	Scunthorpe United	Away	1–1	3,968	Charles	
27	24 January 2012	Milton Keynes Dons	Home	4–2	3,345	Bostwick, Laird, Charles, MacKenzie (o.g)	
28	14 February 2012	Sheffield Wednesday	Away	1–0	16,185	Laird	
29	22 February 2012	Notts County	Away	0–1	5,733		
30	25 February 2012	Charlton Athletic	Away	0–2	26,546		
31	28 February 2012	Huddersfield Town	Home	2–2	3,059	Bostwick, Shroot	
32	3 March 2012	Exeter City	Away	1–1	4,437	Shroot	
33	10 March 2012	Chesterfield	Home	2–2	3,534	Laird, Reid	
34	13 March 2012	Oldham Athletic	Home	1–0	2,453	Wilson	
35	17 March 2012	Hartlepool United	Away	0–0	4,484		
36	20 March 2012	Colchester United	Home	0–0	2,419		
37	24 March 2012	Walsall	Away	1–1	4,786	Bostwick	
38	27 March 2012	Bournemouth	Home	2–2	2,550	Freeman, Bostwick	
39	31 March 2012	Wycombe Wanderers	Home	1–1	3,593	Bostwick	
40	6 April 2012	Tranmere Rovers	Away	0–3	8,526		
41	9 April 2012	Preston North End	Home	1–1	3,386	Roberts	
42	14 April 2012	Yeovil Town	Away	6–0	3,610	Freeman (2), Agyemang, Ashton, Lascelles, Roberts	
43	17 April 2012	Carlisle United	Home	1–0	3,438	Mousinho	
44	21 April 2012	Brentford	Home	2–1	4,256	Reid, Freeman	
45	28 April 2012	Sheffield United	Away	2–2	30,043	Byrom, Laird	
46	5 May 2012	Bury	Home	3–0	4,781	Reid, Byrom (pen), Beardsley	

- Note: Stevenage goals come first.

=== League One play-offs ===
As a result of Stevenage finishing sixth in the league, they faced third placed Sheffield United over two legs in the League One play-off semi-finals. Due to Sheffield United's higher standing in the league table, Stevenage had home advantage in the first leg, with the game being played on 11 May 2012, televised live on Sky Sports. The game was a tight affair with very little chances, ending in a 0–0 draw. The only chance of note during the game was Craig Reid's looping effort that beat Steve Simonsen in the Sheffield United goal, but rebounded off the crossbar. The second leg, played at Sheffield United's Bramall Lane, took place on 14 May, and was again a televised match. Similarly to the first leg, the game was a close encounter, with very little chances in the first-half. Sheffield United took the lead with just five minutes remaining, Chris Porter heading in Matthew Lowton's right wing cross to give the home side a 1–0 lead. Stevenage had little time to reply, and they ultimately bowed out at the semi-final stage of the play-offs in their first ever League One campaign.

Game	Date	Opponent	Venue	Result	Attendance	Goalscorers	Notes
SF1	11 May 2012	Sheffield United	Home	0–0	5,802		
SF2	14 May 2012	Sheffield United	Away	0–1	21,182		

- Note: Stevenage goals come first.

=== League Cup ===
First Round fixtures for the competition were released on 16 June 2011, with Stevenage being drawn against Championship opposition in the form of Peterborough United at Broadhall Way. The match ended 4–3 to Peterborough, with the game having gone to extra-time. The visitors took the lead after twenty minutes, David Ball heading in from close range after a spell of Peterborough pressure. Stacy Long equalised for Stevenage with a sweeping shot following good work down the right wing from Lawrie Wilson. Ball then scored his second of the game to restore Peterborough's advantage in the second-half, before a late 25-yard effort from Michael Bostwick took the game to extra-time. Former Stevenage player George Boyd scored with a curling left-footed free-kick just six minutes into the added on period to give Peterborough the lead for the third time in the match. Substitute Chris Beardsley scored with a header from an acute angle with just three minutes remaining to tie the scores again, before Lee Tomlin converted from the penalty spot after Boyd had been fouled in the area to give Peterborough a late victory.

Game	Date	Opponent	Venue	Result	Attendance	Goalscorers	Notes
1	9 August 2011	Peterborough United	Home	3–4	2,414	Long, Bostwick, Beardsley	

- Note: Stevenage goals come first.

=== FA Cup ===
The club entered the 2011–12 FA Cup at the First Round stage — only the second time the club had entered the competition at this stage since 1997. The First Round draw was made on 29 October, with Stevenage facing an away trip to League One side Hartlepool United. The game was played on 12 November, with Stevenage securing a 1–0 away win. Hartlepool were reduced to ten men after just eight minutes when goalkeeper Scott Flinders brought Chris Beardsley down in the area. Scott Laird scored the subsequent penalty and Stevenage held on to book a place in the Second Round. The following day, Stevenage were dealt an away tie against either League Two strugglers Plymouth Argyle or Southern Football League side Stourbridge. Stourbridge beat Plymouth 2–0 in the replay, meaning they would host Stevenage at the War Memorial Athletic Ground on 3 December. Stevenage progressed to the Third Round for the second consecutive season after they beat Stourbridge 3–0 courtesy of three second-half goals. After a cagey first-half, Stevenage opened the scoring mid-way into the second period, with Chris Beardsley scoring from six yards out after Michael Bostwick's shot had been parried out by goalkeeper Lewis Solly. The away side doubled their advantage twelve minutes later when Beardsley converted Byron Harrison's centre. Substitute Robin Shroot scored in injury-time after Harrison's initial shot was saved.

The Third Round draw was made a day after the Stourbridge victory, on 4 December, with the club being dealt an away tie against Championship club Reading. The two sides had met the year before, with Reading knocking Stevenage out of the FA Cup during the 2010–11 campaign, beating Stevenage 2–1 at Broadhall Way in the fourth round. Stevenage travelled to the Madejski Stadium on 7 January 2012, winning the match 1–0 courtesy of a first-half Darius Charles strike. Charles' goal came after twenty minutes, when he collected the ball from Scott Laird before driving at goal, his shot took a deflection off of Kaspars Gorkšs and beat the outstretched Adam Federici in the Reading goal. A day later, the fourth-round draw was made, with Stevenage being drawn against League One opposition for the second time in the 2011–12 competition, facing a home tie against Notts County. The game was played on 28 January, with Stevenage securing a 1–0 victory at Broadhall Way. The game was also Gary Smith's first game in-charge, having been appointed as manager in the week prior to the game. The only goal of the match came in the first-half, with Luke Freeman getting to the ball ahead of Notts County goalkeeper Stuart Nelson, before lashing a shot across the face of goal that was deflected in off of Damion Stewart. The victory meant that the club had reached the fifth round of the FA Cup for the first time in their history.

The draw for the fifth round was made on 29 January, with Stevenage being dealt a home tie against Premier League side Tottenham Hotspur. The game was played on 19 February, and was also televised on ITV, ending in a 0–0 draw. Tottenham had the ball in the net early in the second-half, but Louis Saha's shot hit Scott Parker on the line, and the goal was consequently disallowed as a result of Parker being in an offside position. Stevenage's Joel Byrom had the hosts best efforts of the match with two long-range second-half strikes. Shortly after the game, the Quarter Final draw was made, with the winners of the tie facing a home game against Premier League side Bolton Wanderers. The replay was played on 7 March, and the game was also televised live on ESPN. Tottenham ran out 3–1 winners at White Hart Lane. Stevenage took a surprise lead after just three minutes, Joel Byrom's bursting run into the area was unfairly halted by Ryan Nelsen, with the referee awarding a penalty. Byrom stepped up and stroked the ball past Carlo Cudicini in the Tottenham goal. Tottenham restored parity twenty minutes later when Jermain Defoe latched onto Gareth Bale's long ball and subsequently fired the ball into the net from the edge of the area. The home side won a penalty just after the interval, Bale winning the penalty after he was adjudged to have been fouled by Stevenage captain Mark Roberts — Emmanuel Adebayor scored the resulting penalty. Stevenage spurned a number of opportunities to draw level, before Tottenham then added a third late-on when Defoe ran onto Bale's long throw-in before finishing from an acute angle.

Game	Date	Opponent	Venue	Result	Attendance	Goalscorers	Notes
1	12 November 2011	Hartlepool United	Away	1–0	2,744	Laird (pen)	
2	3 December 2011	Stourbridge	Away	3–0	3,067	Beardsley (2), Shroot	
3	7 January 2012	Reading	Away	1–0	11,295	Charles	
4	28 January 2012	Notts County	Home	1–0	4,439	Stewart (o.g)	
5	19 February 2012	Tottenham Hotspur	Home	0–0	6,625		
5R	7 March 2012	Tottenham Hotspur	Away	1–3	35,757	Byrom (pen)	

- Note: Stevenage goals come first.

=== Football League Trophy ===
Stevenage were awarded a bye to the Second Round of the Football League Trophy. This is because the competition is split into Northern and Southern sections, with eight clubs in each section bypassing the First Round draw. The draw was made on 3 September 2011, with Stevenage being dealt an away tie against AFC Wimbledon, with the game being played on 4 October 2011. The game ended 2–2, with AFC Wimbledon winning the tie 4–3 on penalties. Stevenage had taken the lead after just seven minutes, a Brett Johnson clearance hit the legs of Lawrie Wilson and deflected past AFC Wimbledon goalkeeper Jack Turner. The home side turned the game around shortly after the interval, scoring twice in the space of four second-half minutes. Former Stevenage player Sam Hatton restored parity from the penalty spot after Darius Charles had fouled Ryan Jackson, before Rashid Yussuff beat Alan Julian with a tidy finish. Stevenage captain Mark Roberts' 20-yard injury-time volley meant that the tie went to penalties, with AFC Wimbledon progressing to the Third Round after Wilson missed the final spot-kick.

Game	Date	Opponent	Venue	Result	Attendance	Goalscorers	Notes
1	4 October 2011	AFC Wimbledon	Away	2–2p	1,416	Wilson, Roberts	

- Note: Stevenage goals come first.

== League table ==
Pos	Team	Pld	W	D	L	GF	GA	GD	Pts	Promotion, qualification or relegation
4	Huddersfield Town (O, P)	46	21	18	7	79	47	+32	81	Qualification for League One play-offs (Note: Four teams play for one spot and promotion to Football League Championship.)
5	Milton Keynes Dons	46	22	14	10	84	47	+37	80	Qualification for League One play-offs
6	Stevenage	46	18	19	9	69	44	+25	73	Qualification for League One play-offs
7	Notts County	46	21	10	15	75	63	+12	73	
8	Carlisle United	46	18	15	13	65	66	−1	69	

Updated to match(es) played on 5 May 2012. Source: BBC Sport
Rules for classification: 1) Points; 2) Goal difference; 3) Number of goals scored
(O) Play-off winners; (P) Promoted

== Season statistics ==
=== Starts and goals ===
No.	Pos	Nat	Player	Total		League One		FA Cup		League Cup		FL Trophy	
No.	Pos	Nat	Player	Apps	Goals	Apps	Goals	Apps	Goals	Apps	Goals	Apps	Goals
1	GK	(Northern Ireland) NIR	Alan Julian	5	0	2+1	0	0	0	1	0	1	0
2	DF	(England) ENG	Lawrie Wilson	56	6	46+2	5	6	0	1	0	1	1
3	DF	(England) ENG	Scott Laird	56	9	48	8	6	1	1	0	1	0
4	DF	(England) ENG	Darius Charles	34	5	23+5	4	4	1	1	0	0+1	0
5	DF	(England) ENG	Jon Ashton	53	1	44+1	1	6	0	1	0	1	0
6	DF	(England) ENG	Phil Edwards	27	0	11+11	0	1+3	0	1	0	0	0
7	MF	(Republic of Ireland) IRL	Darren Murphy	0	0	0	0	0	0	0	0	0	0
8	MF	(England) ENG	Stacy Long	32	2	18+12	1	0+1	0	1	1	0	0
10	FW	(England) ENG	Craig Reid	34	7	25+6	7	1+1	0	0	0	1	0
11	MF	(England) ENG	Jennison Myrie-Williams	19	0	3+15	0	0+1	0	0	0	0	0
12	FW	(England) ENG	Ben May	10	0	2+5	0	1+2	0	0	0	0	0
13	MF	(England) ENG	Joel Byrom	40	5	31+3	4	4+2	1	0	0	0	0
14	DF	(England) ENG	Mark Roberts	56	7	48	6	6	0	1	0	1	1
15	FW	(England) ENG	Luke Freeman	32	7	24+4	7	4	0	0	0	0	0
16	GK	(England) ENG	Chris Day	52	0	46	0	6	0	0	0	0	0
17	MF	(England) ENG	Peter Winn	1	0	0	0	0	0	0+1	0	0	0
18	FW	(Republic of Ireland) IRL	Don Cowan	9	0	2+6	0	0+1	0	0	0	0	0
19	MF	(Cyprus) CYP	Michael Thalassitis	3	0	0+3	0	0	0	0	0	0	0
20	FW	(England) ENG	Chris Beardsley	40	10	15+17	7	6	2	0+1	1	1	0
21	MF	(England) ENG	John Mousinho	23	3	14+7	3	1	0	0	0	1	0
23	MF	(England) ENG	Rob Sinclair	0	0	0	0	0	0	0	0	0	0
24	MF	(England) ENG	Michael Bostwick	53	8	45	7	6	0	1	1	1	0
25	DF	(England) ENG	Ronnie Henry	40	0	32	0	6	0	1	0	1	0
27	FW	(England) ENG	Jordan Slew	9	0	6+3	0	0	0	0	0	0	0
29	FW	(Ghana) GHA	Patrick Agyemang	15	1	12+3	1	0	0	0	0	0	0
30	DF	(England) ENG	Jamaal Lascelles	9	1	7+2	1	0	0	0	0	0	0
32	MF	(Northern Ireland) NIR	Robin Shroot	33	4	11+15	3	2+3	1	0+1	0	1	0
Players who left the club before the end of the season
9	FW	(Cameroon) CMR	Guy Madjo	1	0	0+1	0	0	0	0	0	0	0
22	MF	(England) ENG	Chuks Aneke	6	0	2+4	0	0	0	0	0	0	0
26	FW	(England) ENG	Byron Harrison	23	2	10+8	2	0+3	0	1	0	0+1	0
28	MF	(England) ENG	Josh Walker	6	1	0+5	1	0	0	0	0	0+1	0

- Note: '+' denotes appearance as a substitute.
- Note: 'League One' column also includes League One play-offs.
- Note: Herts Senior Cup games and statistics not included.

=== End of Season Awards ===
Award	Player
Supporters Association Player of the Year	Mark Roberts
Players' Player of the Year	Michael Bostwick

== Transfers ==
=== In ===
Pos	Player	From	Fee	Date	Notes
FW	Guy Madjo (CMR)	KS Bylis Ballsh	Free Transfer	13 June 2011	
GK	Alan Julian (NIR)	Gillingham	Free Transfer	21 June 2011	
DF	Phil Edwards (ENG)	Accrington Stanley	Free Transfer	27 June 2011	
MF	Jennison Myrie-Williams (ENG)	St Johnstone	Free Transfer	8 July 2011	
MF	Robin Shroot (NIR)	Birmingham City	Free Transfer	26 July 2011	
FW	Don Cowan (IRL)	Longford Town	Undisclosed	31 August 2011	
FW	Luke Freeman (ENG)	Arsenal	Undisclosed	10 January 2012	

=== Out ===
Pos	Player	To	Fee	Date	Notes
FW	Yemi Odubade (NGA)	Gateshead	Released	7 June 2011	
FW	Charlie Griffin (ENG)	Forest Green Rovers	Released	14 June 2011	
GK	Ashley Bayes (ENG)	Basingstoke Town	Released	20 June 2011	
DF	Luke Foster (ENG)	Rotherham United	Free Transfer	20 June 2011	
MF	David Bridges (ENG)	Kettering Town	Free Transfer	1 August 2011	
FW	Byron Harrison (ENG)	AFC Wimbledon	Undisclosed	10 January 2012	
FW	Guy Madjo (CMR)	Aldershot Town	Undisclosed	20 January 2012	

=== Loans in ===
Pos	Player	From	Date	End date	Notes
MF	Josh Walker (ENG)	Watford	30 August 2011	17 November 2011	
MF	Luke Freeman (ENG)	Arsenal	17 November 2011	8 January 2012	
MF	Chuks Aneke (ENG)	Arsenal	22 November 2011	6 March 2012	
MF	James Wallace (ENG)	Everton	9 January 2012	16 January 2012	
FW	Jordan Slew (ENG)	Blackburn Rovers	2 March 2012	31 May 2012	
FW	Patrick Agyemang (GHA)	Queens Park Rangers	8 March 2012	31 May 2012	
DF	Jamaal Lascelles (ENG)	Nottingham Forest	9 March 2012	31 May 2012	

=== Loans out ===
Pos	Player	To	Date	End date	Notes
MF	Peter Winn (ENG)	Cambridge United	31 August 2011	1 December 2011	
MF	Michael Thalassitis (CYP)	Boreham Wood	8 October 2011	4 January 2012	
FW	Guy Madjo (CMR)	Port Vale	24 November 2011	3 January 2012	
MF	Jennison Myrie-Williams (ENG)	Port Vale	24 November 2011	3 January 2012	
MF	Darren Murphy (IRL)	Aldershot Town	10 February 2012	12 March 2012	
MF	Michael Thalassitis (CYP)	Hayes & Yeading United	17 February 2012	22 March 2012	
MF	Peter Winn (ENG)	Grimsby Town	8 March 2012	31 May 2012	
DF	Phil Edwards (ENG)	Rochdale	9 March 2012	31 May 2012	
FW	Ben May (ENG)	Barnet	10 March 2012	31 May 2012	
MF	Rob Sinclair (ENG)	Aldershot Town	13 March 2012	12 April 2012	

== See also ==
- 2011–12 in English football
- List of Stevenage F.C. seasons
