= Mark Roberts (footballer, born 1983) =

English association football player (born 1983)

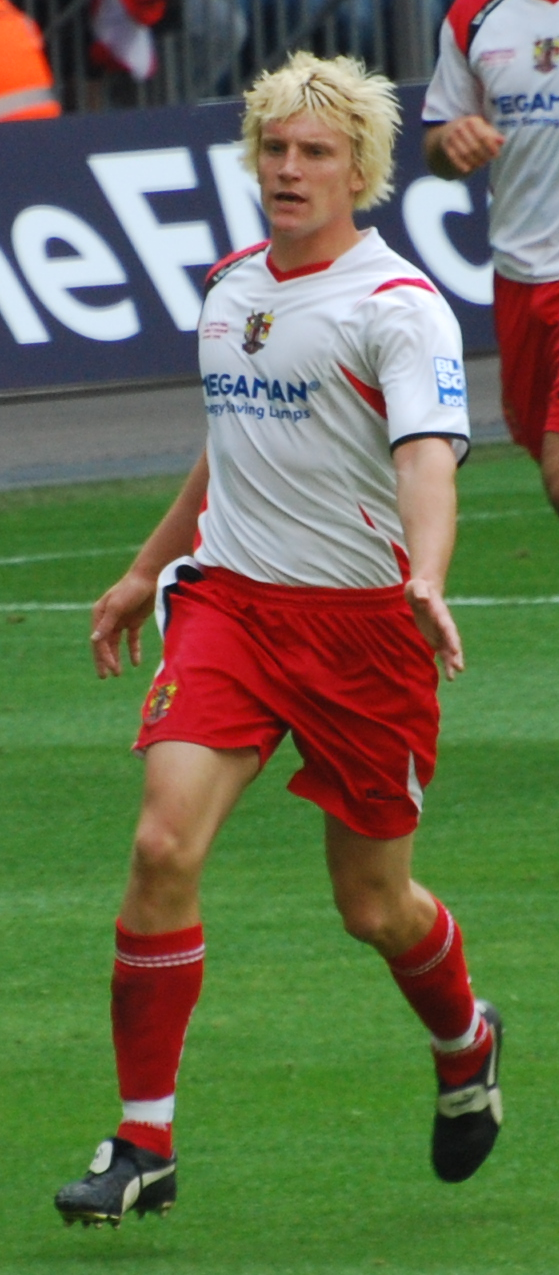
- Roberts playing for Stevenage Borough in the 2009 FA Trophy final

Personal information
- Full name: Mark Alan Roberts
- Date of birth: 16 October 1983 (age 43)
- Place of birth: Northwich, England
- Height: 6 ft 1 in (1.85 m)
- Position: Centre-back

Youth career
- 2000–2003: Crewe Alexandra

Senior career*
| Years | Team | Apps | (Gls) |
| 2003–2007 | Crewe Alexandra | 5 | (0) |
| 2003–2004 | → Leek Town (loan) | 10 | (2) |
| 2004 | → Vauxhall Motors (loan) | 19 | (3) |
| 2005–2006 | → Southport (loan) | 6 | (0) |
| 2006 | → Chester City (loan) | 1 | (0) |
| 2006 | → Southport (loan) | 14 | (0) |
| 2006–2007 | → Halifax Town (loan) | 13 | (1) |
| 2007 | → Northwich Victoria (loan) | 3 | (0) |
| 2007 | Northwich Victoria | 20 | (1) |
| 2007–2008 | Accrington Stanley | 34 | (0) |
| 2008 | → Northwich Victoria (loan) | 9 | (1) |
| 2008–2009 | Northwich Victoria | 20 | (1) |
| 2008 | → Stevenage Borough (loan) | 6 | (0) |
| 2009–2013 | Stevenage | 189 | (21) |
| 2013–2015 | Fleetwood Town | 60 | (6) |
| 2015–2017 | Cambridge United | 57 | (4) |
| 2017–2018 | Forest Green Rovers | 14 | (0) |
| 2018–2022 | Warrington Town | 119 | (8) |
| Total | | 573 | (46) |

Managerial career
- 2012: Stevenage (caretaker)
- 2013: Stevenage (caretaker)
- * Club domestic league appearances and goals as of 22:39, 9 August 2022 (UTC)

Mark Alan Roberts (born 16 October 1983) is an English former professional footballer who played as a centre-back.

Roberts began his career at Crewe Alexandra's youth academy, signing a professional contract in 2003. He made six first-team appearances during seven years and was loaned out on six occasions, including to his hometown club, Northwich Victoria, whom he joined permanently in January 2007. After a brief spell back in the Football League with Accrington Stanley, he returned to Northwich before joining Stevenage Borough in November 2008. He was part of the team that won the FA Trophy in May 2009 and was appointed club captain ahead of the 2009–10 season. As captain, he led Stevenage to successive promotions from the Conference Premier to League One. Roberts made 237 appearances across five years, and also served twice as the club's caretaker manager.

In July 2013, Roberts joined Fleetwood Town, captaining them to League One via the play-offs in his first season. He then spent two years with Cambridge United and a season with Forest Green Rovers, before moving into non-League with Warrington Town in August 2018. Roberts captained the club to a Northern Premier League play-off victory in his first season and made 144 appearances over four years, retiring from playing in 2022.

== Early life ==
Born in Northwich, Cheshire, Roberts also grew up in Cheshire. He was a season ticket holder at Old Trafford during his childhood, where he sat in the Stretford End supporting Manchester United. Roberts started playing football for his local team, Northwich Town, at the age of seven.

== Career ==
=== Early career ===
Roberts joined Crewe Alexandra at the age of 11 and progressed through the club's academy, signing his first professional contract on 6 July 2003. In November 2003, he joined Northern Premier League Division One club Leek Town on a two-month loan. He made his debut in a 3–1 victory against Lincoln United on 22 November 2003 and scored his first senior goal in a 2–1 home defeat to Kidsgrove Athletic on 26 December 2003. Roberts made 10 appearances and scored twice during the loan. Roberts subsequently spent time on loan at Vauxhall Motors of the Northern Premier League Premier Division, making 19 appearances and scoring three goals during the remainder of the 2003–04 season.

After playing his first full 90 minutes for Crewe in a 2–1 pre-season friendly victory over Everton, assistant manager Neil Baker stated that Roberts had the potential to "bridge the gap" to first-team football and praised the way he adapted to the higher level. Roberts made his first-team debut for Crewe on 21 September 2004, starting in a League Cup match against Sunderland that Crewe won 4–2 on penalties following a 3–3 draw after extra time. He made his Football League debut in a 1–0 away defeat to Preston North End on 25 September 2004, and made five further appearances before an injury curtailed his run in the first team.

Having been unable to establish himself in the Crewe first team, Roberts was loaned to Conference National club Southport on 23 November 2005. He made six appearances during the loan, before joining Chester City on a one-month loan, where he played once in a 5–0 defeat to Carlisle United. Roberts returned to Southport for a second loan in March 2006, making 12 appearances and receiving the first red card of his career in a 2–1 win at Forest Green Rovers. Ahead of the 2006–07 season, he was loaned to Conference National club Halifax Town, where he made 13 appearances and scored once before returning to Crewe in November 2006. Roberts joined his hometown club Northwich Victoria on loan on 3 January 2007, making his debut in a 3–1 away victory over St Albans City. After three appearances, he signed permanently and became a regular during the second half of the 2006–07 season as Northwich's form improved.

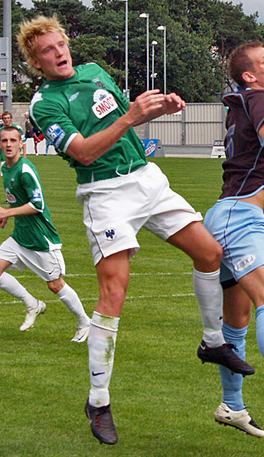
Roberts playing for Northwich Victoria in 2008

Roberts returned to the Football League with Accrington Stanley on 3 July 2007 for a fee set by a tribunal. He started the first 30 matches of the 2007–08 season and made three further appearances as a substitute. He rejoined Northwich Victoria on a one-month loan on 28 March 2008, making nine appearances and scoring once in a 4–3 victory against relegation rivals Stafford Rangers to help the club secure Conference Premier safety. Roberts signed permanently for Northwich following the loan spell, and made 20 appearances during the first three months of the 2008–09 season, scoring once in a 3–2 home defeat to Weymouth on 27 September 2008.

=== Stevenage ===
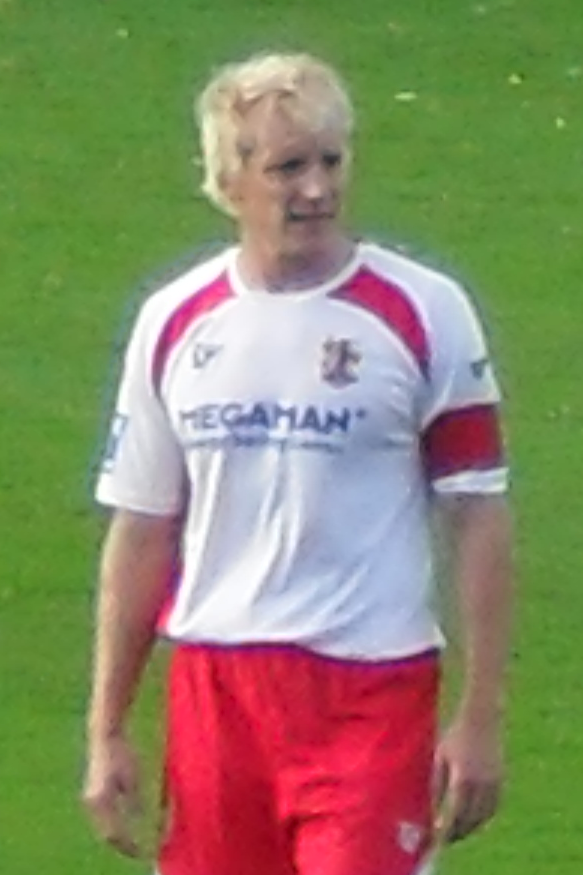
Roberts playing for Stevenage Borough in 2009

Roberts started for Northwich in a 1–1 draw away to Stevenage Borough on 15 November 2008, and joined the Hertfordshire club on loan a week later. After impressing manager Graham Westley during his one-month loan agreement, he signed permanently for Stevenage the following month. He scored his first goal for the club in a 2–0 FA Trophy win at Farnborough on 14 January 2009, and scored his first league goal in a 2–1 victory away to Altrincham on 28 February 2009, an injury-time winner. Roberts played regularly as Stevenage finished in the final play-off positions, scoring in the semi-final first leg against Cambridge United as the club were defeated 4–3 on aggregate. He was named Stevenage Player of the Year at the end of the season, having also started in all seven of the club's FA Trophy matches, scoring twice and playing in the 2–0 final victory against York City on 9 May 2009. In May 2009, Roberts was appointed club captain for the 2009–10 season, with Westley describing him as "a natural leader who leads by example".

"It was important to get the championship in the bag, now we can enjoy it. Obviously we have worked so hard to achieve this. No-one will probably ever know how hard we have worked and every one of the lads deserves a pat on the back."

— Captain Mark Roberts, on Stevenage securing promotion to the Football League in April 2010.

Roberts scored his first goal of the 2009–10 season on his 50th appearance for Stevenage, giving the club the lead in a 3–1 victory against Salisbury City on 17 October 2009. He captained the team in a 2–0 victory against Kidderminster Harriers at Aggborough on 17 April 2010, a result that confirmed Stevenage's promotion to the Football League for the first time in its history. Roberts played 49 times that season, scoring five times from defence, and was named Conference Premier Player of the Month for April 2010. Forming a central defensive partnership with Jon Ashton, he was part of the back line that conceded 24 goals in 46 league matches, the best defensive record in the division. Stevenage ended the season with six consecutive clean sheets and conceded only twice across their last 15 league fixtures. In May 2010, Roberts signed a new two-year contract with the club, describing it as a "privilege" to continue as captain in the Football League. He was also named in the Conference Premier Team of the Year, alongside teammates Ronnie Henry and Scott Laird.

"I do not mind admitting that there were a few tears. In the dressing room afterwards there was a mixture of enjoyment and reflection on what we have achieved".

— Roberts, on Stevenage earning back-to-back promotions after their 1–0 play-off final victory over Torquay United in May 2011.

Roberts captained Stevenage in their first-ever Football League match, a 2–2 home draw with Macclesfield Town at the start of the 2010–11 season. He scored his first goal of the season in a 3–0 away victory over local rivals Barnet on 2 November 2010, and added two further goals in a 4–0 away win against Macclesfield Town on 26 March 2011, taking his tally to five for the season. He captained the team in the 2011 League Two play-off final against Torquay United at Old Trafford on 28 May 2011, playing the entirety of a 1–0 victory that secured Stevenage consecutive promotions and a place in League One for the first time in their history. Stevenage ended the season with the best defensive record in League Two, conceding 45 goals, and also reached the FA Cup fourth round, with Roberts featuring in all five matches, including the 3–1 home win over Premier League club Newcastle United. He made 52 appearances in all competitions during the season, scoring six goals.

Roberts captained the team in their first match in League One, a 0–0 draw against Exeter City on 6 August 2011. He signed a new two-year contract with the club later that month. He scored an injury-time 20-yard volley in a 2–2 Football League Trophy draw with AFC Wimbledon on 4 October 2011, taking the match to penalties, which Stevenage lost 4–3. He described the volley as "easily the best goal of his career". Following the departure of manager Graham Westley to Preston North End in January 2012, Roberts took interim charge for three matches, overseeing a 5–1 victory at Rochdale a 1–1 draw with Scunthorpe United, and a 4–2 home win against Milton Keynes Dons, before Gary Smith's appointment as manager. Roberts played every minute of Stevenage's 56 matches during the 2011–12 season, scoring seven goals from defence as the club reached the play-off semi-finals. He also featured in all six of the team's FA Cup fixtures as Stevenage progressed to the fifth round for the first time in their history, facing Tottenham Hotspur over two matches. Roberts was named Stevenage's Player of the Year at the end of the season, becoming only the third player to win the award twice.

Roberts playing for Stevenage in March 2013

In the summer of 2012, Stevenage rejected several transfer offers from Doncaster Rovers for Roberts and fellow centre-back Jon Ashton. He captained the team in the opening match of the 2012–13 season, scoring the third goal in a 3–1 League Cup victory against AFC Wimbledon on 14 August 2012. Two days later, the club confirmed that Roberts would not be sold during the campaign. In February 2013, he was shortlisted by the Football League for the Player in the Community award in recognition of his community work. Following the dismissal of manager Gary Smith in March 2013, Roberts was appointed caretaker manager while the club searched for a permanent appointment. He scored in his final game as caretaker, heading in the opening goal in a 1–1 away draw with Crawley Town, in which Stevenage played with 10 men for most of the match following Miguel Comminges' early red card. After the match, Roberts stated he was "proud of the phenomenal performance". Graham Westley was reappointed as manager the following day, with Roberts resuming his playing duties. He made 48 appearances and scored four goals during the season. Across four and a half years at Stevenage, Roberts made 237 appearances and scored 27 goals in all competitions, placing him sixth on the club's all-time appearance list.

=== Fleetwood Town ===
Following the expiry of his contract at Stevenage, and having rejected the club's offer of a new contract, Roberts joined League Two club Fleetwood Town on a free transfer on 3 July 2013. Upon signing, he described Fleetwood as "an exciting prospect" and expressed admiration for the club's ambitions and vision. He was appointed club captain ahead of the 2013–14 season. Roberts scored six minutes into his debut, heading the opening goal in a 3–1 home victory against Dagenham & Redbridge, which was also the first goal of the League Two season. Fleetwood finished fourth in the league, securing a place in the play-offs. Roberts played in all three play-off matches, with the team recording three consecutive clean sheets en route to promotion to League One following a 1–0 victory over Burton Albion in the final at Wembley Stadium. He made 45 appearances and scored three goals in all competitions during his first season with the club.

He remained at Fleetwood for the club's first season in League One, initially featuring infrequently and making just one appearance in the opening two months of the 2014–15 season. He returned to the starting line-up on 4 October 2014, playing the full match in a 1–0 home victory over Port Vale, and subsequently established himself as a regular in central defence. Roberts scored on the final day of the season in a 2–1 victory against Port Vale on 3 May 2015, scoring from close range. The match marked his final appearance for the club, with Fleetwood finishing 10th in their debut League One season. Over two seasons, Roberts made 72 appearances in all competitions, scoring six times. He was released at the end of his contract in May 2015 as part of a wider first-team restructuring focused on youth development.

=== Cambridge United ===
Roberts signed a two-year contract with League Two club Cambridge United on 25 May 2015, and was appointed club captain, a role he had previously held at both Stevenage and Fleetwood Town. He made his debut on the opening day of the 2015–16 season in a 3–0 home victory over Newport County. Roberts scored his first goal for Cambridge in a 2–2 draw to York City on 3 October 2015, finishing from close range to earn a point after the team had trailed by two goals. A week later, he received a red card for violent conduct in a 3–1 home defeat to Portsmouth. He remained a regular starter until late January 2016, when he was dropped and replaced as captain; manager Shaun Derry noted that Roberts had accepted the change professionally. He finished the season with 34 appearances and two goals.

Roberts remained with Cambridge for the 2016–17 season, making his first start on 26 September 2016, helping the team earn their first victory of the season, a 2–1 away win against Newport County. Three days later, he scored the only goal in a 1–0 win against Yeovil Town, moving Cambridge off the bottom of the League Two table. Roberts remained a regular starter for the following five months, contributing to an upturn in the team's form. He scored a 92nd-minute equaliser in an eventual 4–2 extra-time FA Cup victory at Dover Athletic on 17 November 2016, helping Cambridge progress to the third round against Leeds United. His third goal of the season was a 93rd-minute winner in a 3–2 victory over Newport County in February 2017. Roberts played 31 matches during the season, scoring three goals. At the end of the season, he was placed on the transfer list with a year remaining on his contract. Having not featured in the opening weeks of the 2017–18 season, his contract was cancelled by mutual consent on 24 August 2017.

=== Forest Green Rovers ===
On the same day that his departure from Cambridge was announced, Roberts signed for fellow League Two club Forest Green Rovers on a one-year contract. He made his Forest Green debut on 26 August 2017, playing the full 90 minutes in a 5–1 away defeat to Colchester United. Initially a regular in central defence, Roberts did not feature for the first team from the start of 2018, his last appearance for the club coming in a 2–0 defeat to Yeovil Town in the EFL Trophy on 9 January 2018. He left the club upon the expiry of his contract in May 2018, having made 20 appearances in all competitions.

=== Warrington Town ===
Roberts joined Northern Premier League Premier Division club Warrington Town on a free transfer ahead of the 2018–19 season. He made his debut in a 2–0 home defeat to Farsley Celtic and was appointed club captain for the following fixture, an away victory against Lancaster City. He scored his first goal for the club in a 3–3 draw with Nantwich Town on 23 February 2019. Roberts played regularly as Warrington finished third in the Northern Premier Division. He played in all of the club's three play-off fixtures, winning the Northern Premier Division play-offs, before losing 3–2 after extra time in the step three super play-off final to King's Lynn Town on 11 May 2019. He made 49 appearances during the season, scoring twice, and signed a one-year contract extension on 24 May 2019.

Roberts played regularly for Warrington during the 2019–20 and 2020–21 seasons, both of which were curtailed due to the COVID-19 pandemic, with the club positioned third and fourth in the Northern Premier League Premier Division at the time of suspension. He signed a one-year contract extension on 9 July 2021, making 47 appearances during the 2021–22 season as Warrington reached the play-off final, where they were defeated. Roberts announced his retirement from playing on 20 June 2022.

== Style of play ==
Roberts was primarily deployed as a centre-back and was described as a commanding presence in central defence. He was appointed club captain at Stevenage, Fleetwood, Cambridge United and Warrington, with his leadership skills often cited as one of his main strengths. Roberts was also noted as a goalscoring threat from set-pieces, scoring the majority of his goals from attacking free kicks and corners.

== Personal life ==
Roberts studied professional sports writing and broadcasting at Staffordshire University, graduating in 2012. He subsequently completed two further football-related business qualifications at the Sports Business Institute and gained ACGP accreditation through a corporate governance programme, reflecting his interest in the administrative and boardroom aspects of football. In 2020, he earned a Master of Business Administration degree from the University of Salford, focusing on CEOs in sport. Roberts also serves as a personal development mentor for League Football Education (LFE), supporting first-year apprentices at six professional clubs.

== Career statistics ==
Appearances and goals by club, season and competition
| Club | Season | League | | | FA Cup | | League Cup | | Other | | Total | |
| Club | Season | Division | Apps | Goals | Apps | Goals | Apps | Goals | Apps | Goals | Apps | Goals |
|---|---|---|---|---|---|---|---|---|---|---|---|---|
| Crewe Alexandra | 2004–05 | Championship | 6 | 0 | 0 | 0 | 1 | 0 | 0 | 0 | 7 | 0 |
| Crewe Alexandra | 2005–06 | Championship | 0 | 0 | 0 | 0 | 0 | 0 | 0 | 0 | 0 | 0 |
| Crewe Alexandra | 2006–07 | Championship | 0 | 0 | 0 | 0 | 0 | 0 | 0 | 0 | 0 | 0 |
| Crewe Alexandra | Total | | 6 | 0 | 0 | 0 | 1 | 0 | 0 | 0 | 7 | 0 |
| Leek Town (loan) | 2003–04 | Northern Premier League Division One | 10 | 2 | 0 | 0 | — | | 0 | 0 | 10 | 2 |
| Vauxhall Motors (loan) | 2003–04 | Northern Premier League Premier Division | 19 | 3 | 0 | 0 | — | | 0 | 0 | 19 | 3 |
| Southport (loan) | 2005–06 | Conference National | 6 | 0 | 0 | 0 | — | | 0 | 0 | 6 | 0 |
| Chester City (loan) | 2005–06 | League Two | 1 | 0 | 0 | 0 | 0 | 0 | 0 | 0 | 1 | 0 |
| Northwich Victoria | 2006–07 | Conference National | 23 | 1 | 0 | 0 | — | | 3 (Note: Appearance(s) in FA Trophy) | 0 | 26 | 1 |
| Accrington Stanley | 2007–08 | League Two | 34 | 0 | 1 | 0 | 1 | 0 | 1 (Note: Appearance(s) in Football League Trophy) | 0 | 37 | 0 |
| Northwich Victoria | 2007–08 | Conference Premier | 9 | 1 | 0 | 0 | — | | 0 | 0 | 9 | 1 |
| Northwich Victoria | 2008–09 | Conference Premier | 20 | 1 | 0 | 0 | — | | 0 | 0 | 20 | 1 |
| Northwich Victoria | Total | | 29 | 2 | 0 | 0 | 0 | 0 | 0 | 0 | 29 | 2 |
| Stevenage | 2008–09 | Conference Premier | 25 | 2 | 0 | 0 | — | | 9 (Note: Seven appearances and two goals in FA Trophy; two appearances and one goal in 2009 Conference Premier play-offs) | 3 | 34 | 5 |
| Stevenage | 2009–10 | Conference Premier | 37 | 4 | 3 | 0 | — | | 6 | 1 | 45 | 5 |
| Stevenage | 2010–11 | League Two | 43 | 6 | 5 | 0 | 1 | 0 | 4 (Note: One appearance in Football League Trophy; three appearances in 2011 League Two play-offs) | 0 | 53 | 6 |
| Stevenage | 2011–12 | League One | 46 | 6 | 6 | 0 | 1 | 0 | 3 (Note: One appearance and one goal in Football League Trophy; two appearances in 2012 League One play-offs) | 1 | 56 | 7 |
| Stevenage | 2012–13 | League One | 44 | 2 | 1 | 0 | 2 | 1 | 1 | 1 | 48 | 4 |
| Stevenage | Total | | 195 | 20 | 15 | 0 | 4 | 1 | 23 | 6 | 237 | 27 |
| Fleetwood Town | 2013–14 | League Two | 33 | 3 | 3 | 0 | 1 | 0 | 8 (Note: Five appearances in Football League Trophy; three appearances in 2013 League Two play-offs) | 0 | 45 | 3 |
| Fleetwood Town | 2014–15 | League One | 27 | 3 | 0 | 0 | 0 | 0 | 1 | 0 | 28 | 3 |
| Fleetwood Town | Total | | 60 | 6 | 3 | 0 | 1 | 0 | 9 | 0 | 73 | 6 |
| Cambridge United | 2015–16 | League Two | 30 | 2 | 2 | 0 | 1 | 0 | 1 | 0 | 34 | 2 |
| Cambridge United | 2016–17 | League Two | 27 | 2 | 4 | 1 | 0 | 0 | 0 | 0 | 31 | 3 |
| Cambridge United | Total | | 57 | 4 | 6 | 1 | 1 | 0 | 1 | 0 | 65 | 5 |
| Forest Green Rovers | 2017–18 | League Two | 14 | 0 | 2 | 0 | 0 | 0 | 4 | 0 | 20 | 0 |
| Warrington Town | 2018–19 | Northern Premier League Premier Division | 39 | 2 | 6 | 0 | — | | 4 (Note: Two appearances in FA Trophy; three appearances in 2019 Northern Premier League play-offs) | 0 | 49 | 2 |
| Warrington Town | 2019–20 | Northern Premier League Premier Division | 31 | 5 | 4 | 2 | — | | 1 | 0 | 36 | 7 |
| Warrington Town | 2020–21 | Northern Premier League Premier Division | 9 | 1 | 1 | 0 | — | | 2 | 0 | 12 | 1 |
| Warrington Town | 2021–22 | Northern Premier League Premier Division | 40 | 0 | 2 | 0 | — | | 5 (Note: Three appearances in FA Trophy; two appearances in 2022 Northern Premier League play-offs) | 0 | 47 | 0 |
| Warrington Town | Total | | 119 | 8 | 13 | 2 | 0 | 0 | 12 | 0 | 144 | 10 |
| Career total | | | 573 | 46 | 40 | 3 | 8 | 1 | 53 | 6 | 674 | 55 |

== Honours ==
Stevenage

- Football League Two play-offs: 2011
- Conference Premier: 2009–10
- FA Trophy: 2008–09; runner-up: 2009–10

Fleetwood Town

- Football League Two play-offs: 2014

Warrington Town

- Northern Premier League Premier Division play-offs: 2019

Individual

- Stevenage Player of the Year: 2008–09, 2011–12
- Conference Premier Team of the Year: 2008–09, 2009–10
- Conference Premier Player of the Month: April 2010
- Northern Premier League Premier Division Team of the Year: 2018–19
