= Don Cowan =

American-born Irish footballer

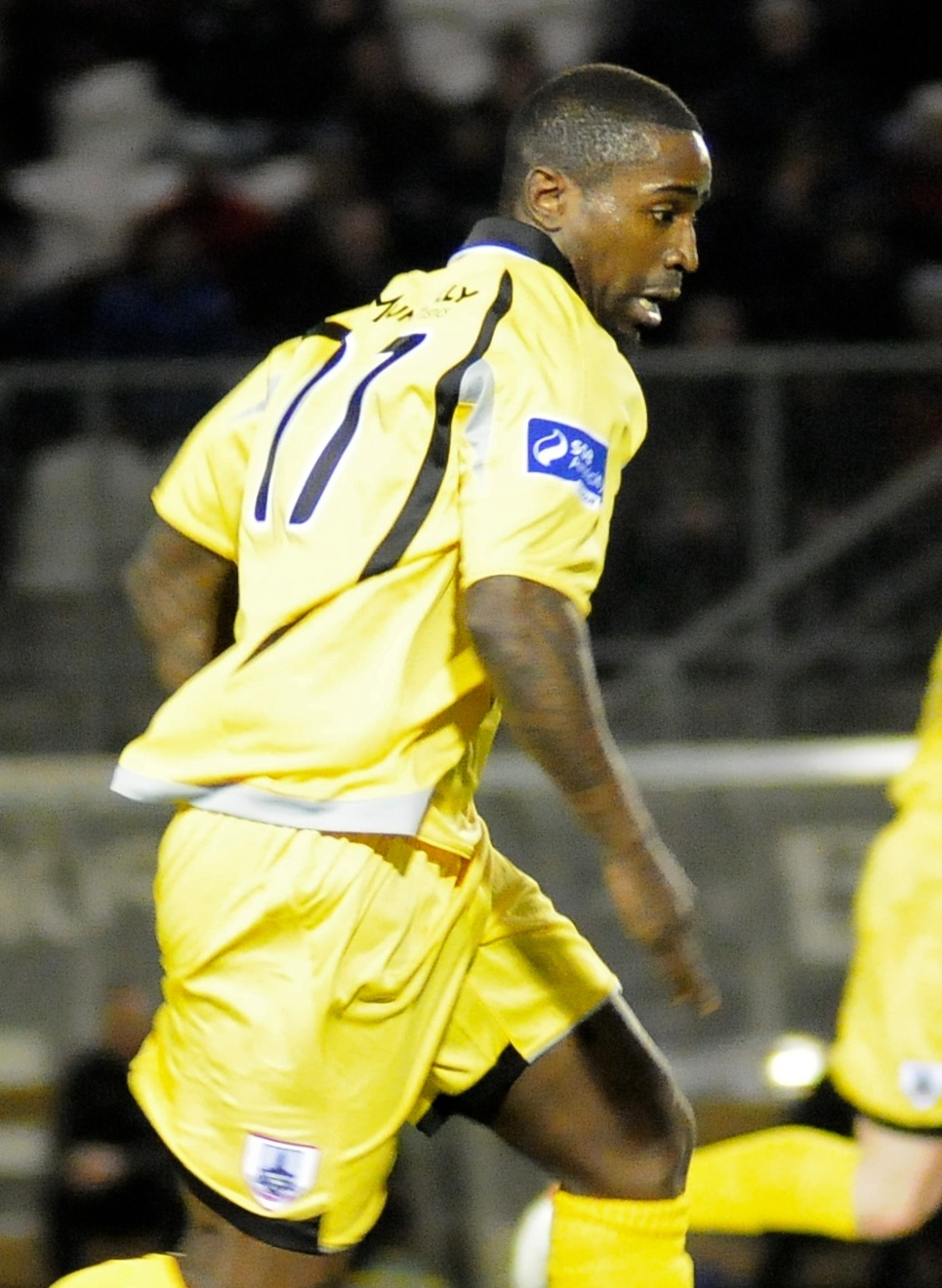
- Cowan with Longford Town in 2014

Personal information
- Date of birth: 16 November 1989 (age 37)
- Place of birth: New York City, U.S.
- Height: 5 ft 10 in (1.78 m)
- Positions: Winger; forward

Youth career
- 2008–2009: Shamrock Rovers A

Senior career*
Years	Team	Apps	(Gls)
2009–2010	Shamrock Rovers	8	(0)
2010	→ Longford Town (loan)	13	(0)
2010–2011	Longford Town	19	(8)
2011–2013	Stevenage	8	(0)
2012	→ Braintree Town (loan)	1	(0)
2013	Dundee	2	(0)
2013	Southend United	2	(0)
2013	Stevenage	1	(0)
2014–2017	Longford Town	73	(4)
Total		127	(12)
- * Club domestic league appearances and goals

Don Cowan (born 16 November 1989) is an American former professional footballer who played as a winger or forward.

Cowan began his career with Shamrock Rovers, playing for the club's reserve team before making several substitute appearances for the first team over two seasons. He joined Longford Town on loan to gain first-team experience, a move that was made permanent ahead of the 2011 season. After establishing himself as a regular at Longford, Cowan signed for League One club Stevenage for an undisclosed fee in August 2011. He later joined Braintree Town on loan in November 2012, though the spell was curtailed by injury, and he left Stevenage by mutual consent in January 2013.

He subsequently had brief stints with Scottish Premier League club Dundee and Southend United of League Two in 2013, as well as a one-month return to Stevenage later that year. Cowan rejoined Longford in January 2014 and helped the club gain promotion to the League of Ireland Premier Division during the 2014 season. He remained with Longford for four seasons, scoring four goals in 78 appearances, before retiring from professional football in 2017.

== Early life ==
Cowan was born in New York City. During his youth, he cited Andy Cole as his footballing idol.

== Career ==
=== Early career ===
Cowan began his career with Shamrock Rovers A, playing in the 2009 A Championship. He progressed to the first team and made his senior debut as an 87th-minute substitute in a 2–1 victory over St Patrick's Athletic in the League of Ireland Premier Division on 4 July 2009. He made four further substitute appearances during the 2009 season.

=== Longford Town ===
He made three substitute appearances for Shamrock Rovers during the early stages of the 2010 season, before joining First Division club Longford Town on 19 July 2010 to gain first-team experience. He made his debut in a 1–1 home draw with Cork City on 3 July 2010, his first senior start. Cowan made 13 appearances for Longford during the season, eight of which were starts, without scoring.

Ahead of the 2011 season, Cowan signed for Longford on a permanent basis. He scored his first goal in the opening match of the season, a 2–1 defeat to Shelbourne on 5 March 2011. He added further goals in home victories against Waterford United and Salthill Devon in April, taking his tally to four for the season. In July 2011, Cowan underwent a trial with English Championship club Millwall, after impressing their management team in a friendly between the two clubs. He featured for Millwall's reserves in a match against Brighton & Hove Albion reserves, although no transfer followed. Cowan returned to Longford and scored his final goal for the club in a home defeat to Shelbourne on 13 August 2011, having scored his first against the same opposition five months earlier. He made 33 appearances in all competitions during the season, scoring eight goals.

=== Stevenage ===
Following a trial, Cowan signed for League One club Stevenage on 31 August 2011 for an undisclosed five-figure fee. His debut was delayed due to international clearance issues, with the transfer formally completed on 13 September 2011 after clearance was granted. A series of minor injuries limited his involvement during the first two months of his spell with the club, and he made his first-team debut as a 77th-minute substitute in a 2–1 home victory against Tranmere Rovers on 17 December 2011. He made his first start nine days later in a 6–1 away victory at Colchester United on 26 December 2011. Cowan scored four first-half goals in a 5–0 Herts Senior Cup victory over Barnet on 31 January 2012. In the following round against Bishop's Stortford, he sustained a transverse fracture at the base of his tibia after a "rather innocuous tackle", ruling him out for six months and sidelining him for the remainder of the 2011–12 season as well as the start of the following season.

Having not made any first-team appearances following his recovery from injury, Cowan joined Conference Premier club Braintree Town on a one-month loan on 22 November 2012. He sustained an injury eight minutes into his debut in an away match against Southport on 8 December 2012, resulting in his early return to Stevenage. In January 2013, Cowan left the club by mutual consent, having made nine appearances in all competitions during an injury-affected spell.

=== Dundee and Southend United ===
Cowan signed for Scottish Premier League club Dundee on a free transfer on 19 February 2013. He made his debut on 17 March 2013, as an 80th-minute substitute in a 1–1 away draw with rivals Dundee United. Following limited opportunities under new manager John Brown, he was released at the end of the season after Dundee's relegation, having made two substitute appearances.

He returned to England to sign for League Two club Southend United on a one-month contract on 5 August 2013. Cowan made his debut in a 1–0 League Cup defeat to Yeovil Town on 6 August 2013, starting and playing 71 minutes. He made two further appearances before leaving the club upon the expiry of his contract on 2 September 2013.

=== Return to Stevenage ===
Without a club for a month, Cowan returned to League One club Stevenage on 27 September 2013, signing a one-month contract. A day later, he played as a second-half substitute in Stevenage's 4–1 away defeat to Milton Keynes Dons. After two appearances during his brief return, Cowan left the club after his one-month contract concluded on 21 October 2013.

=== Return to Longford Town ===
Cowan rejoined Longford Town on 10 January 2014. He made his first appearance in the opening game of the 2014 season, a 1–0 victory against Galway on 7 March 2014, and scored his first goal of the season in a 6–0 victory against Shamrock Rovers B on 30 May 2014. He scored three goals in 24 appearances as Longford won the League of Ireland First Division title.

In Longford's first season back in the Premier Division in 2015, Cowan made 10 appearances, scoring once in a 2–1 victory away at Galway United on 27 March 2015. He featured 21 times during the 2016 season, which ended in relegation to the First Division, and played 23 matches in 2017, before retiring from football in October 2017.

== Career statistics ==
Appearances and goals by club, season and competition
Club	Season	League			National cup (Note: Includes FA Cup, FAI Cup)		League Cup (Note: Includes Football League Cup)		Other		Total	
Club	Season	Division	Apps	Goals	Apps	Goals	Apps	Goals	Apps	Goals	Apps	Goals
Shamrock Rovers	2009	LOI Premier Division	5	0	0	0	0	0	0	0	5	0
Shamrock Rovers	2010	LOI Premier Division	3	0	0	0	0	0	0	0	3	0
Shamrock Rovers	Total		8	0	0	0	0	0	0	0	8	0
Longford Town	2010	LOI First Division	13	0	0	0	0	0	0	0	13	0
Longford Town	2011	LOI First Division	19	8	1	0	0	0	0	0	20	8
Longford Town	Total		32	8	1	0	0	0	0	0	33	8
Stevenage	2011–12	League One	8	0	1	0	—		0	0	9	0
Stevenage	2012–13	League One	0	0	0	0	0	0	0	0	0	0
Stevenage	Total		8	0	1	0	0	0	0	0	9	0
Braintree Town (loan)	2012–13	Conference Premier	1	0	0	0	—		0	0	1	0
Dundee	2012–13	Scottish Premier League	2	0	—		—		0	0	2	0
Southend United	2013–14	League Two	2	0	0	0	1	0	0	0	3	0
Stevenage	2013–14	League One	1	0	0	0	—		1 (Note: Appearance in Football League Trophy)	0	2	0
Longford Town	2014	LOI First Division	22	3	0	0	0	0	2	0	24	3
Longford Town	2015	LOI Premier Division	10	1	0	0	0	0	0	0	10	1
Longford Town	2016	LOI Premier Division	21	0	0	0	0	0	0	0	21	0
Longford Town	2017	LOI First Division	20	0	1	0	0	0	2	0	23	0
Longford Town	Total		73	4	1	0	0	0	4	0	78	4
Career total			127	12	3	0	1	0	5	0	136	12

== Honours ==
Longford Town

- League of Ireland First Division: 2014
