= Scott Laird =

English Footballer (born 1988)

Personal information
- Full name: Scott Benjamin Laird
- Date of birth: 15 May 1988 (age 38)
- Place of birth: Taunton, England
- Height: 5 ft 9 in (1.75 m)
- Positions: Left-back; central midfielder

Team information
- Current team: Street (player-manager)

Youth career
- 2000–2006: Plymouth Argyle

Senior career*
| Years | Team | Apps | (Gls) |
| 2006–2008 | Plymouth Argyle | 0 | (0) |
| 2006–2007 | → Tiverton Town (loan) | 18 | (4) |
| 2007 | → Torquay United (loan) | 2 | (0) |
| 2008 | → Stevenage Borough (loan) | 4 | (0) |
| 2008–2012 | Stevenage | 186 | (21) |
| 2012–2015 | Preston North End | 84 | (5) |
| 2015–2017 | Scunthorpe United | 33 | (2) |
| 2016–2017 | → Walsall (loan) | 28 | (3) |
| 2017–2019 | Forest Green Rovers | 35 | (2) |
| 2019 | → Walsall (loan) | 7 | (0) |
| 2019–2023 | Weston-super-Mare | 106 | (33) |
| 2023–2024 | Barnstaple Town | 24 | (3) |
| 2024 | → Gloucester City (loan) | 1 | (0) |
| 2024– | Street | 52 | (9) |

International career
| 2003–2007 | Scotland U16–U20 | 36 | (6) |
| 2009 | England C | 1 | (0) |

Managerial career
- 2025–: Street
- * Club domestic league appearances and goals as of 23:40, 19 August 2026 (UTC)

Scott Benjamin Laird (born 15 May 1988) is an English professional footballer and football manager who is player-manager of Western League Premier Division club Street. Primarily a left-back, he has also been deployed as a central midfielder later in his career.

Laird began his career as a trainee at Plymouth Argyle, progressing through the club's centre of excellence and making one first-team appearance. He had loan spells at Tiverton Town, Torquay United, and Stevenage Borough, joining the latter permanently in February 2008. Over five years with Stevenage, he made 230 appearances, helping the club achieve successive promotions from the Conference Premier to League One and earning the club's Player of the Year award for the 2009–10 season. He left Stevenage in May 2012 and signed for Preston North End, where he spent three seasons and achieved promotion to the Championship during the 2014–15 season.

He subsequently played for Scunthorpe United and Forest Green Rovers, and spent two separate loan spells at Walsall, before joining Weston-super-Mare in a player-assistant manager role in June 2019. Over four years, Laird made 132 appearances and helped the club win promotion to the National League South during the 2022–23 title-winning season. He later played for Barnstaple Town and Gloucester City in 2023–24, before joining Street, where he was appointed manager in October 2025. Internationally, he captained Scotland at youth level from the under-16 team through to under-20 level and earned one cap for the England C team in April 2009.

== Early life ==
Laird was born in Taunton, Somerset, and grew up in Bridgwater. As a child, he supported Rangers and Ipswich Town, citing Brian Laudrup as a player he always aspired to play like. He began playing football at the age of nine at East Bridgwater School, which served as a satellite centre for Plymouth Argyle.

== Club career ==
=== Early career ===
At the age of 14, Laird progressed to Plymouth Argyle's centre of excellence in Ivybridge. He travelled from his home in Bridgwater to train with the club twice a week, making the one-hour journey every Tuesday and Thursday. During this period, he was primarily deployed as a left-sided centre-back. In 2003, Laird attracted interest from Scottish Premier League club Rangers, who made an enquiry following his performances for Scotland in the Victory Shield; however, a transfer did not materialise, and he continued his development within Plymouth's youth system. He signed an academy scholarship with the club at the age of 16, and in February 2006, was offered a two-year professional contract by manager Tony Pulis, which he signed a year later. While an apprentice, Laird resided in a hotel designated for youth players alongside Luke Summerfield, Reuben Reid, and Chris Zebroski, describing the experience as a "great way to grow into football".

The following season, Laird joined Southern League Premier Division club Tiverton Town on an initial one-month loan on 8 September 2006. He made his debut the following day in a 2–1 victory against Wealdstone. The loan was subsequently extended by a further five months, and Laird scored his first senior goal during a 4–1 defeat to Hemel Hempstead Town on 5 April 2007. Laird made 21 appearances during the loan, of which 17 were in the league, and scored four goals from a central midfield role. He returned to Plymouth ahead of the 2007–08 season and made his Plymouth debut in a 2–1 League Cup victory over Wycombe Wanderers on 14 August 2007, playing the full match and providing the assist for Plymouth's second goal. He did not appear for Plymouth again and, in September 2007, joined nearby Conference Premier club Torquay United. Although his loan at Torquay was extended on 16 November 2007, he made just two first-team appearances during the two-month loan spell.

=== Stevenage ===
A month after returning to Plymouth, Laird was loaned to another Conference Premier club, Stevenage Borough, on 31 December 2007. He made his debut the following day in a 2–1 victory against Rushden & Diamonds. After impressing manager Peter Taylor, Laird signed for Stevenage on a permanent basis on 1 February 2008 for an undisclosed fee. He played regularly at left-back during the second half of the 2007–08 season, scoring his first goal for the club with a 35-yard shot in a 4–1 victory away at Histon on 4 March 2008. Under new manager Graham Westley, Laird made 51 appearances during the 2008–09 season, scoring three goals. He registered his first goal of the campaign in Stevenage's first victory of the season, a 3–1 win at Barrow on 30 August 2008. Laird also played in six matches during the club's FA Trophy run that season, though he missed the final at Wembley Stadium after being sent off in the Conference Premier play-off semi-final defeat to Cambridge United. In his absence, Stevenage won the final 2–0 against York City.

Laird remained Stevenage's first-choice left-back throughout the 2009–10 season. He scored his first goal of the season in a 2–0 victory over Histon at Bridge Road on 31 August 2009, and later scored the decisive goal in a 1–0 away victory against local rivals Luton Town, scoring in the 85th minute during the clubs' first ever league meeting. His second-half penalty gave Stevenage a 1–0 victory over second-placed Oxford United on 30 March 2010, meaning Stevenage moved eight points clear of Oxford at the top of the Conference Premier league table. Laird made 51 appearances across the season, more than any other player, and contributed six goals as Stevenage secured promotion to the Football League for the first time in their history. He was named Stevenage's Player of the Year, and subsequently signed a two-year contract extension in May 2010. At the end of the season, he was also recognised as the 2009–10 Young Player of the Year at the National Game Awards, and was included in the Conference Premier Team of the Year, alongside fellow Stevenage defenders Ronnie Henry and Mark Roberts.

He started in Stevenage's inaugural Football League fixture, a 2–2 draw at home to Macclesfield Town on 7 August 2010. At the age of 22, Laird captained the team for the first time in a 1–0 defeat to Hereford United on 8 March 2011. He made 54 appearances during that season, scoring four goals. His contributions included three appearances during the League Two play-offs, as Stevenage earned promotion to League One with a 1–0 win against Torquay United at Old Trafford on 28 May 2011, in which Laird played the full match. Laird's performances in the opening months of the 2011–12 season resulted in interest from several Championship clubs. He finished the season as Stevenage's second-highest goalscorer as the club missed out on a third successive promotion following a play-off semi-final defeat. At the end of the season, Laird declined an improved contract offer and left the club upon the expiry of his contract. He made 230 appearances during his four years with the club, scoring 23 goals.

=== Preston North End ===
Laird signed for League One club Preston North End on a free transfer on 27 May 2012. The move reunited him with manager Graham Westley, under whom he had previously played at Stevenage. He made his debut for Preston in the club's first match of the 2012–13 season, playing the full 90 minutes in a 2–0 home win over Huddersfield Town in the League Cup on 13 August 2012. Laird scored his first goals for the club in a 5–0 win against Hartlepool United at Deepdale on 18 September 2012, scoring twice within the space of three second-half minutes. He was described as Preston's "standout performer" in the opening months of the season, having registered four goals and seven assists from left-back. However, on 20 November 2012, Laird sustained a broken leg following a challenge from Jamal Campbell-Ryce during a home match against Notts County. Scans later confirmed a fracture to his left tibia, ruling him out for the remainder of the season. During his recovery, Laird stated that Campbell-Ryce called him weekly, and the two remained on good terms. Prior to the injury, Laird had made 24 appearances during his debut season with Preston, scoring four goals.

A year-and-a-half after sustaining his broken leg, Laird returned to the Preston first team at the start of the 2013–14 season, making his first appearance after injury as a 74th-minute substitute in a 0–0 draw away at Rotherham United on 10 August 2013. He scored his only goal of the season in a 3–0 home win against former club Stevenage on 14 September 2013. Laird signed a one-year contract extension on 17 December 2013, keeping him contracted to the club until the summer of 2015. He made 42 appearances during the season, scoring once, as Preston missed out on promotion back to the Championship after losing in the play-off semi-finals to Rotherham United.

Laird remained a regular at left-back for Preston during the 2014–15 season. He scored in the club's 3–1 home defeat to Manchester United in the FA Cup on 16 February 2015, briefly giving Preston the lead with a left-footed shot just after half-time. Laird featured in all three of the club's play-off matches that season, including their 4–0 victory over Swindon Town in the final at Wembley Stadium, securing promotion back to the Championship after a four-year absence. He rejected the offer of a new contract at Preston at the end of the season, citing concerns over reduced playing time, but acknowledged the management had been "brilliant to work with". Over three years at Preston, Laird made 108 appearances and scored seven goals.

=== Scunthorpe United ===
Following his departure from Preston, Laird signed for League One club Scunthorpe United on 11 June 2015, joining on a free transfer and on a three-year deal. He made his Scunthorpe debut on the opening day of the 2015–16 season, playing the full match in a 2–1 defeat away to Burton Albion. Laird scored his first goal for Scunthorpe in a 2–1 victory over Shrewsbury Town on 17 October 2015, his header just before the hour mark restoring parity in the match after Scunthorpe had trailed in the first-half. He made 38 appearances in all competitions that season, scoring twice, as Scunthorpe missed out on the League One play-offs after finishing in seventh position.

Having made just one appearance in the opening month of the 2016–17 season, Laird joined fellow League One club Walsall on loan on 31 August 2016, initially until January 2017. He made his Walsall debut in a 2–0 away defeat to Northampton Town on 10 September 2016, and scored his first goal in a 2–1 away victory over Sheffield United in an EFL Trophy tie on 4 October 2016. His loan was extended until the end of the season in January 2017, with Laird stating he was "absolutely delighted" to sign the extension. Laird made 31 appearances during the loan spell, scoring four goals. Upon returning to Scunthorpe, his contract was terminated by mutual consent in June 2017.

=== Forest Green Rovers ===
After leaving Scunthorpe United, Laird signed for newly promoted League Two club Forest Green Rovers on 20 June 2017, joining on a two-year contract. He made his debut in Forest Green's first ever Football League fixture, a 2–2 home draw with Barnet on 5 August 2017. Laird scored his first goal for Forest Green in a 2–0 win over Morecambe on 20 October 2017, doubling Forest Green's lead with a second-half free-kick. He made 43 appearances in all competitions during the club's first season in League Two, scoring three goals.

Following just one appearance for Forest Green during the first half of the 2018–19 season, Laird returned to League One club Walsall on loan on 17 January 2019. He made his second debut two days later as an 80th-minute substitute in a 3–0 away victory at Gillingham. Laird made seven appearances during the loan spell. He was released by Forest Green at the end of the 2018–19 season.

=== Weston-super-Mare ===
Following his departure from Forest Green, Laird signed for Southern League Premier Division South club Weston-super-Mare on 15 June 2019, taking on a player-assistant manager role. He made his Weston-super-Mare debut in the club's opening game of the 2019–20 season, playing the full match in a 2–2 draw against Hendon on 10 August 2019. Three days later, Laird scored his first goal for the club with an injury-time penalty to secure Weston-super-Mare a 1–1 away draw at Merthyr Town. He recorded his first career hat-trick in a 6–0 victory over Dorchester Town on 12 October 2019. Laird scored 13 goals in 30 appearances from a central midfield role before the season was curtailed in March 2020 due to the COVID-19 pandemic.

The 2020–21 season was also curtailed due to restrictions associated with the COVID-19 pandemic, with Laird having made 12 appearances and scored twice. He registered 12 goals in 48 matches the following season, as Weston-super-Mare were defeated 2–1 in the play-off semi-final to Hayes & Yeading. During the 2022–23 season, Laird made 42 appearances and scored 11 goals as the club secured promotion to the National League South after winning the Southern League Premier Division South title. He left the club on 1 July 2023 after accepting a full-time position working at Millfield School. Upon his departure, Laird was described as "one of Weston-super-Mare's greatest all-time players".

=== Later career ===
Laird joined Western League Premier Division club Barnstaple Town ahead of the 2023–24 season, playing under his father Craig, who was first-team manager, and alongside his brother Callum. He scored five goals in 34 appearances as Barnstaple reached the Western League Premier Division play-off semi-final, where they were defeated by Falmouth Town. During the same season, he also made two appearances for National League North club Gloucester City, joining on a dual-registration loan in March 2024. He subsequently joined Street as player-assistant manager in July 2024, with his father Craig serving as first-team coach and his brother Callum also making the move. Laird made 27 appearances during the 2024–25 season. Following his appointment as player-manager in October 2025, he combined his managerial and playing responsibilities during the 2025–26 season, scoring 11 goals in 35 appearances.

== International career ==
Although born in England, Laird represented Scotland at youth level, captaining the under-16 team all the way through to under-20 level. He played in all three of Scotland's matches in the 2003 Victory Shield, scoring twice as Scotland finished joint winners with England. Overall, Laird made 36 appearances across various Scottish youth levels, scoring six goals.

In April 2009, Laird was called up by Paul Fairclough for the England C team, who represent England at non-League level, and started in a 1–0 defeat to Belgium under-21s on 19 May 2009.

== Coaching career ==
After obtaining his UEFA B Licence and UEFA A Licence, Laird served as player-assistant manager at Weston-super-Mare for four years. He subsequently joined Western League Premier Division club Street as player-assistant manager for the 2024–25 season. Following the departure of manager Ben Watson, Laird was appointed joint manager alongside his father, Craig, on 13 October 2025. Street finished 12th in the Western League Premier Division during the 2025–26 season.

== Style of play ==
Laird began his career as a left-sided centre-back before being moved to central midfield in the early stages of his career. He transitioned to left-back at Stevenage, a position he predominantly played throughout his professional career. Described as a "marauding, attacking full-back", he consistently contributed double figures in goals and assists across five seasons from 2008 to 2013. Following a leg break in November 2012, Laird acknowledged losing some of his pace and felt he was "never the same player" upon returning. He later reverted to a central midfield role during his time at Weston-super-Mare.

== Personal life ==
Laird's father, Craig, is a football manager, having managed Bridgwater Town, Weston-super-Mare, and Dorchester Town. Laird has three brothers, Craig, Jamie, and Callum. His brother Craig played soccer at the University of Tampa and represented England at schoolboy level, whilst Jamie and Callum have played semi-professional football. Laird's grandmother gave him a one pound coin each time he scored a goal.

== Career statistics ==
As of match played 15 August 2026

Appearances and goals by club, season and competition
| Club | Season | League | | | FA Cup | | League Cup | | Other | | Total | |
| Club | Season | Division | Apps | Goals | Apps | Goals | Apps | Goals | Apps | Goals | Apps | Goals |
|---|---|---|---|---|---|---|---|---|---|---|---|---|
| Plymouth Argyle | 2006–07 | Championship | 0 | 0 | 0 | 0 | 0 | 0 | 0 | 0 | 0 | 0 |
| Plymouth Argyle | 2007–08 | Championship | 0 | 0 | 0 | 0 | 1 | 0 | 0 | 0 | 1 | 0 |
| Plymouth Argyle | Total | | 0 | 0 | 0 | 0 | 1 | 0 | 0 | 0 | 1 | 0 |
| Tiverton Town | 2006–07 | Southern League Premier | 18 | 4 | 0 | 0 | — | | 2 | 0 | 20 | 4 |
| Torquay United | 2007–08 | Conference Premier | 2 | 0 | 0 | 0 | — | | 0 | 0 | 2 | 0 |
| Stevenage | 2007–08 | Conference Premier | 15 | 1 | 0 | 0 | — | | 0 | 0 | 15 | 1 |
| Stevenage | 2008–09 | Conference Premier | 43 | 2 | 2 | 1 | — | | 9 (Note: One appearance in Conference League Cup; six appearances in FA Trophy; two appearances in 2009 Conference Premier play-offs) | 0 | 54 | 3 |
| Stevenage | 2009–10 | Conference Premier | 42 | 6 | 3 | 0 | — | | 6 (Note: Appearances in FA Trophy) | 0 | 51 | 6 |
| Stevenage | 2010–11 | League Two | 44 | 4 | 5 | 0 | 1 | 0 | 4 (Note: One appearance in Football League Trophy; three appearances in 2011 League Two play-offs) | 0 | 54 | 4 |
| Stevenage | 2011–12 | League One | 46 | 8 | 6 | 1 | 1 | 0 | 3 (Note: One appearance in Football League Trophy; two appearances in 2012 League One play-offs) | 0 | 56 | 9 |
| Stevenage | Total | | 190 | 21 | 16 | 2 | 2 | 0 | 22 | 0 | 230 | 23 |
| Preston North End | 2012–13 | League One | 19 | 4 | 1 | 0 | 3 | 0 | 1 (Note: Appearance in Football League Trophy) | 0 | 24 | 4 |
| Preston North End | 2013–14 | League One | 34 | 1 | 5 | 0 | 1 | 0 | 2 (Note: One appearance in Football League Trophy; one appearance in 2014 League One play-offs) | 0 | 42 | 1 |
| Preston North End | 2014–15 | League One | 31 | 0 | 3 | 1 | 1 | 0 | 7 (Note: Four appearances in Football League Trophy; three appearances in 2015 League One play-offs) | 1 | 42 | 2 |
| Preston North End | Total | | 84 | 5 | 9 | 1 | 6 | 0 | 10 | 1 | 108 | 7 |
| Scunthorpe United | 2015–16 | League One | 32 | 2 | 4 | 0 | 1 | 0 | 1 | 0 | 38 | 2 |
| Scunthorpe United | 2016–17 | League One | 1 | 0 | 0 | 0 | 0 | 0 | 0 | 0 | 1 | 0 |
| Scunthorpe United | Total | | 33 | 2 | 4 | 0 | 1 | 0 | 1 | 0 | 39 | 2 |
| Walsall (loan) | 2016–17 | League One | 28 | 3 | 1 | 0 | 0 | 0 | 2 (Note: Appearances in EFL Trophy) | 1 | 31 | 4 |
| Forest Green Rovers | 2017–18 | League Two | 35 | 2 | 3 | 1 | 1 | 0 | 4 | 0 | 43 | 3 |
| Forest Green Rovers | 2018–19 | League Two | 0 | 0 | 0 | 0 | 1 | 0 | 0 | 0 | 1 | 0 |
| Forest Green Rovers | Total | | 35 | 2 | 3 | 1 | 2 | 0 | 4 | 0 | 44 | 3 |
| Walsall (loan) | 2018–19 | League One | 7 | 0 | — | | — | | 0 | 0 | 7 | 0 |
| Weston-super-Mare | 2019–20 | Southern League Premier South | 25 | 11 | 3 | 2 | — | | 2 (Note: One appearance in FA Trophy; one appearance in Somerset Premier Cup) | 0 | 30 | 13 |
| Weston-super-Mare | 2020–21 | Southern League Premier South | 6 | 2 | 4 | 0 | — | | 2 | 0 | 12 | 2 |
| Weston-super-Mare | 2021–22 | Southern League Premier South | 38 | 9 | 4 | 2 | — | | 6 (Note: Two appearances and one goal in FA Trophy; three appearances in Southern League Cup; one appearance in 2022 Southern League Premier Division South play-offs) | 1 | 48 | 12 |
| Weston-super-Mare | 2022–23 | Southern League Premier South | 37 | 11 | 3 | 0 | — | | 2 | 0 | 42 | 11 |
| Weston-super-Mare | Total | | 106 | 33 | 14 | 4 | 0 | 0 | 12 | 1 | 132 | 38 |
| Barnstaple Town | 2023–24 | Western League Premier Division | 24 | 3 | 1 | 0 | — | | 9 (Note: Three appearances and two goals in FA Vase; five appearances in Les Phillips Cup; one appearance in 2024 Western League Premier Division play-offs) | 2 | 34 | 5 |
| Gloucester City (loan) | 2023–24 | National League North | 1 | 0 | — | | — | | 1 (Note: Appearance in Gloucestershire Senior Cup) | 0 | 2 | 0 |
| Street | 2024–25 | Western League Premier Division | 24 | 0 | 0 | 0 | — | | 3 (Note: Appearances in Les Phillips Cup) | 0 | 27 | 0 |
| Street | 2025–26 | Western League Premier Division | 25 | 9 | 1 | 0 | — | | 9 (Note: Three appearances in FA Vase; three appearances and one goal in Somerset Premier Cup; three appearances and one goal in Les Phillips Cup) | 2 | 35 | 11 |
| Street | 2026–27 | Western League Premier Division | 3 | 0 | 1 | 1 | — | | 0 | 0 | 4 | 1 |
| Street | Total | | 52 | 9 | 2 | 1 | 0 | 0 | 12 | 2 | 66 | 12 |
| Career total | | | 580 | 82 | 50 | 9 | 12 | 0 | 73 | 8 | 715 | 99 |

== Managerial statistics ==
As of match played 15 August 2026

Managerial record by team and tenure
| Team | From | To | Record | | | | | Ref. |
| Team | From | To | P | W | D | L | Win % | Ref. |
|---|---|---|---|---|---|---|---|---|
| Street | 13 October 2025 | Present | 33 | 13 | 5 | 15 | 39.4 | |
| Total | | | 33 | 13 | 5 | 15 | 39.4 | |

== Honours ==
Stevenage

- Football League Two play-offs: 2011
- Conference Premier: 2009–10
- FA Trophy runner-up: 2009–10

Preston North End

- Football League One play-offs: 2015

Individual

- Stevenage Borough Player of the Year: 2009–10
- Conference Premier Team of the Year: 2009–10
