= 2017 National League play-off final =

- Event: 2016–17 National League
Forest Green Rovers	Tranmere Rovers
3	1
- Date: 14 May 2017
- Venue: Wembley Stadium, London
- Referee: Anthony Backhouse
- Attendance: 18,801

The 2017 National League play-off final, known as the Vanarama National League Promotion Final for sponsorship reasons, was held on 14 May 2017 at Wembley Stadium and contested between Forest Green Rovers and Tranmere Rovers at the end of the 2016–17 National League season. It was the 15th National League play-off final, the second under the name National League and the tenth to be played at Wembley. Forest Green Rovers won the match 3–1 to earn promotion to the English Football League for the first time in their history.

== Match ==
=== Details ===
14 May 2017
15:00 BST

Forest Green Rovers	3–1	Tranmere Rovers
Woolery 12', 44'; Doidge 41'	Report	Jennings 22'

Wembley Stadium, London
Attendance: 18,801
Referee: Anthony Backhouse

Forest Green Rovers	Tranmere Rovers

GK	23	Sam Russell
RB	6	Dale Bennett	(yellow card) 74'
CB	5	Mark Ellis
CB	16	Ethan Pinnock
LB	3	Manny Monthé
RM	7	Keanu Marsh-Brown		(substituted off) 61'
CM	4	Drissa Traoré		(substituted off) 81'
CM	20	Charlie Cooper	(yellow card) 67'
CM	15	Liam Noble	(yellow card) 90+1'
LM	14	Kaiyne Woolery
FW	9	Christian Doidge		(substituted off) 76'
Substitutes:
DF	2	Curtis Tilt
MF	8	Sam Wedgbury		(substituted in) 81'
MF	11	Omar Bugiel
MF	17	Daniel Wishart		(substituted in) 61'
FW	18	Shamir Mullings		(substituted in) 76'
Manager:
Mark Cooper

GK	1	Scott Davies
RB	22	Adam Buxton	(yellow card) 63'
CB	5	Steve McNulty
CB	6	Michael Ihiekwe
LB	3	Liam Ridehalgh
RM	10	James Norwood
CM	20	Lois Maynard
CM	24	Jeff Hughes
LM	19	Andy Mangan		(substituted off) 53'
CF	11	Connor Jennings		(substituted off) 61'
CF	23	Cole Stockton
Substitutes:
GK	13	Iain Turner
DF	28	Evan Gumbs
FW	9	Andy Cook		(substituted in) 61'
FW	16	Jack Dunn		(substituted in) 53'
FW	39	Aaron Collins
Manager:
Micky Mellon
