= Brampton (disambiguation) =

Brampton is the third-largest city in the Greater Toronto Area of Ontario, Canada.

Brampton may also refer to:

== Places ==
=== Australia ===
- Brampton Island, Queensland

=== Canada ===
- Brampton, a city in Ontario
  - Brampton (federal electoral district)
  - Brampton (provincial electoral district)
  - Brampton GO Station, a station in the GO Transit network located in the city
  - Brampton Centre (federal electoral district)
  - Brampton North (federal electoral district)
  - Brampton South, federal electoral district
  - Downtown Brampton, main city centre

=== United Kingdom ===
- Brampton, Cambridgeshire
  - RAF Brampton
- Brampton, Carlisle, Cumbria
- Brampton, Westmorland and Furness, Cumbria
- Brampton, Derbyshire, a suburb of Chesterfield sometimes called New Brampton
- Brampton, North East Derbyshire, a civil parish containing Old Brampton
- Brampton, Lincolnshire
- Church with Chapel Brampton, a parish of Northamptonshire:
  - Church Brampton
  - Chapel Brampton
  - Brampton Valley Way
- Brampton, Norfolk
- Brampton, Suffolk
- Brampton Bierlow, South Yorkshire (traditionally in the West Riding of Yorkshire)
- Brampton Bryan, Herefordshire
- Branton, South Yorkshire (formerly Brampton)

=== United States ===
- Brampton, Michigan, an unincorporated community
- Brampton Township, Michigan
- Brampton Township, Sargent County, North Dakota
- Brampton (Chestertown, Maryland), listed on the NRHP in Maryland
- Brampton (Orange, Virginia), listed on the NRHP in Virginia

== People ==
- Arthur Brampton (1864–1955), British Liberal Party politician
- Brampton Gurdon (disambiguation), list of four people
- Charles Brampton (1828–1895), English cricketer
- Edward Brampton (c.1440–1508), English knight and adventurer of Portuguese origin
- John Brampton, archdeacon of Lewes (England) from 1395 to 1419
- Kenneth Brampton (died 1942), Australian actor
- Sally Brampton (1955–2016), English journalist, writer, and editor

== See also ==
- Brampton Manor Academy
- Bampton (disambiguation)
