= 2017–18 Forest Green Rovers F.C. season =

Forest Green Rovers
2017–18 season
- Chairman: Dale Vince
- Manager: Mark Cooper
- Stadium: The New Lawn
- EFL League Two: 21st
- FA Cup: Second round
- EFL Cup: First round (vs. Milton Keynes Dons)
- EFL Trophy: Third round
- Top goalscorer: League: Christian Doidge (20); All: Christian Doidge (25)

The 2017–18 season was Forest Green Rovers's 129th year in existence and their first in League Two following promotion via the play-offs last season. Along with competing in League Two, the club also participated in the FA Cup, EFL Cup and the EFL Trophy.

The season covers the period from 1 July 2017 to 30 June 2018.

== Transfers ==
=== Transfers in ===
Date from	Position	Nationality	Name	From	Fee	Ref.
1 July 2017	CM	(England)	Reece Brown	Birmingham City	Free	
1 July 2017	CB	(England)	Lee Collins	Mansfield Town	Free	
1 July 2017	CM	(England)	Charlie Cooper	Birmingham City	Free	
1 July 2017	LB	(England)	Callum Evans	Barnsley	Free	
1 July 2017	LB	(England)	Scott Laird	Scunthorpe United	Free	
13 July 2017	CF	(England)	Luke James	Peterborough United	Free	
19 July 2017	MF	(England)	Jordan Simpson	Swindon Town	Free	
22 July 2017	GK	(England)	Harry Pickering	Port Vale	Free	
24 August 2017	CB	(England)	Mark Roberts	Cambridge United	Free	
22 September 2017	DM	(England)	Isaiah Osbourne	Walsall	Free	
1 January 2018	MF	(England)	Dayle Grubb	Weston-super-Mare	Undisclosed	

=== Transfers out ===
Date from	Position	Nationality	Name	To	Fee	Ref.
1 July 2017	AM	(France)	Mohamed Chemlal	Free agent	Released	
1 July 2017	LW	(England)	Anthony Jeffrey	Sutton United	Released	(Note: Anthony Jeffrey joined Sutton United following his release.)
1 July 2017	LM	(England)	Marcus Kelly	Wrexham	Released	(Note: Marcus Kelly joined Wrexham following his release.)
1 July 2017	AM	(England)	Louis McGrory	AFC Telford United	Released	(Note: Louis McGrory joined AFC Telford United following his release.)
1 July 2017	CB	(England)	Ethan Pinnock	Barnsley	Undisclosed	
1 July 2017	CM	(England)	Sam Wedgbury	Wrexham	Released	(Note: Sam Wedgbury joined Wrexham following his release.)
25 July 2017	GK	(France)	Simon Lefebvre	FC Lourdes	Mutual consent	
4 August 2017	CB	(England)	Aarran Racine	Free agent	Mutual consent	
23 August 2017	CM	(England)	Rob Sinclair	Oxford City	Mutual consent	(Note: Rob Sinclair joined Oxford City following his departure.)
9 October 2017	CM	(England)	Liam Noble	Notts County	Mutual consent	(Note: Liam Noble signed a pre-contract agreement with Notts County following his departure.)

=== Loans in ===
Date from	Position	Nationality	Name	From	Date until	Ref.
7 July 2017	GK	(England)	Bradley Collins	Chelsea	End of season	
22 July 2017	CB	(England)	Jack Fitzwater	West Bromwich Albion	January 2018	
31 July 2017	CB	(Scotland)	Alex Iacovitti	Nottingham Forest	30 June 2018	
30 August 2017	LW	(England)	Will Randall	Wolverhampton Wanderers	30 June 2018	
31 August 2017	CF	(Portugal)	Toni Gomes	Liverpool	30 June 2018	

=== Loans out ===
Date from	Position	Nationality	Name	To	Date until	Ref.
11 August 2017	MF	(England)	Jordan Morris	Shortwood United	3 January 2018	
11 August 2017	GK	(England)	Harry Pickering	Shortwood United	3 January 2018	
25 August 2017	CF	(England)	Olly Mehew	Taunton Town	3 January 2018	
1 September 2017	MF	(England)	Jordan Simpson	Hungerford Town	24 November 2017	
8 September 2017	LM	(France)	Fabien Robert	Aldershot Town	9 December 2017	(Note: On 9 October, Fabien Robert extended his loan at Aldershot Town until the end of October.) (Note: On 30 October, Fabien Robert further extended his loan with Aldershot Town until early December.)
15 September 2017	LB	(England)	Callum Evans	Torquay United	17 December 2017	
19 September 2017	CF	(Republic of Ireland)	Rhys Murphy	Torquay United	21 December 2017	
20 October 2017	MF	(England)	Tom Anderson	Cirencester Town	3 January 2018	(Note: On 22 November, Tom Anderson's loan was extended until early January.)
6 November 2017	FW	(England)	Shamir Mullings	Macclesfield Town	13 November 2017	(Note: On 13 November, Shamir Mullings' loan at Macclesfield Town was terminated due to injury.)

== Competitions ==
=== Friendlies ===
As of 22 June 2017, Forest Green Rovers have announced nine pre-season friendlies against Bristol Rovers, Kidderminster Harriers, Bishop's Cleeve, Weston-super-Mare, Shortwood United, Brimscombe & Thrupp, Swindon Supermarine, Worthing and Farense during a training camp in Portugal.

11 July 2017	Bishop's Cleeve	0–2	Forest Green Rovers	Bishop's Cleeve
19:30 BST		Report	Wishart (?); Mehew (?)	Stadium: Kayte Lane; Attendance: 225

14 July 2017	Shortwood United	0–4	Forest Green Rovers	Nailsworth
19:30 BST		Report	Doidge 5'; Mehew 57'; Morris 64'; Stevens 80'	Stadium: Meadowbank Ground; Attendance: 368; Referee: Graham Pugh

15 July 2017	Brimscombe & Thrupp	0–3	Forest Green Rovers	Brimscombe and Thrupp
15:00 BST		Report	Doidge 10' (?); Mehew 70'	Stadium: The Meadow; Attendance: 520; Referee: Ben Williamson

18 July 2017	Weston-super-Mare	1–2	Forest Green Rovers	Weston-super-Mare
19:45 BST	Collins 38' (o.g.)	Report	Brown 61'; Mullings (?)	Stadium: Woodspring Stadium; Attendance: 200

22 July 2017	Forest Green Rovers	2–0	Bristol Rovers	Nailsworth
15:00 BST	Noble 14'; Mullings 65'	Report		Stadium: The New Lawn; Attendance: 1,589; Referee: Sam Allison

25 July 2017	Farense	2–1	Forest Green Rovers	Albufeira, Portugal
19:00 WEST	Gomes 3'; Melo 85'	Report	Bugiel 90'	Stadium: Estádio Municipal de Albufeira; Attendance: 192

29 July 2017	Forest Green Rovers	P–P	Kidderminster Harriers	Nailsworth
15:00 BST				Stadium: The New Lawn

31 July 2017	Swindon Supermarine	1–3	Forest Green Rovers	South Marston
19:30 BST	Hooper (?)	Report	Doidge (?); Mullings 48', 70'	Stadium: Hunts Copse

1 August 2017	Worthing	4–1	Forest Green Rovers	Worthing
19:30 BST	Fraser (?); Trueman 49' (o.g.); Douglas 68'; Pope 74'	Report	Trueman (?)	Stadium: Woodside Road; Attendance: 570; Referee: Carl Brook

=== League Two ===
==== League table ====
Pos	Team	Pld	W	D	L	GF	GA	GD	Pts	Promotion, qualification or relegation
19	Yeovil Town	46	12	12	22	59	75	−16	48	
20	Port Vale	46	11	14	21	49	67	−18	47	
21	Forest Green Rovers	46	13	8	25	54	77	−23	47	
22	Morecambe	46	9	19	18	41	56	−15	46	
23	Barnet (R)	46	12	10	24	46	65	−19	46	Relegation to the National League

Source: BBC Sport
Rules for classification: 1) Points; 2) Goal difference; 3) Number of goals scored
(R) Relegated

==== Result summary ====
Overall								Home						Away					
Pld	W	D	L	GF	GA	GD	Pts	W	D	L	GF	GA	GD	W	D	L	GF	GA	GD
31	8	5	18	33	54	−21	29	6	2	8	22	27	−5	2	3	10	11	27	−16

Last updated: 3 February 2018.

==== Results by matchday ====
Matchday	1	2	3	4	5	6	7	8	9	10	11	12	13	14	15	16	17	18	19	20	21	22	23	24	25	26	27	28	29	30	31	32	33	34	35	36	37	38	39	40	41	42	43	44	45	46
Ground	H	A	H	A	A	H	H	A	H	A	H	A	H	A	A	H	A	H	A	H	A	H	H	A	H	H	A	H	A	A	H	A	H	A	H	A	H	A	A	H	H	A	H	A	A	H
Result	D	L	W	L	L	L	L	D	L	L	L	D	L	W	W	W	D	W	L	D	L	L	L	L	L	W	L	W	L	L	W	W	D	W	D	L	L	L	W	L	L	W	W	D	L	L
Position	13	21	15	19	22	22	23	22	23	24	24	22	23	23	23	20	21	18	20	20	23	23	23	23	23	22	23	23	23	23	22	20	21	19	18	19	21	21	20	21	22	21	20	20	21	21

Updated to match(es) played on 3 February 2018. Source: Statto.com
A = Away; H = Home; W = Win; D = Draw; L = Loss

==== Matches ====
On 21 June 2017, the league fixtures were announced.

5 August 2017 1	Forest Green Rovers	2–2	Barnet	Nailsworth
15:00 BST	Doidge 41', 43'	Report	Akpa Akpro 58'; Taylor (yellow card) 59' (yellow-red card) 90+5'; Campbell-Ryce 63'	Stadium: The New Lawn; Attendance: 3,171; Referee: Darren Drysdale

12 August 2017 2	Mansfield Town	2–0	Forest Green Rovers	Mansfield
15:00 BST	Rose 51'; Anderson 57'; Benning (yellow card) 62'	Report	Noble (yellow card) 36'; Collins (yellow card) 39'; Traoré (yellow card) 64'; Mullings (yellow card) 79'; Bennett (yellow card) 86'; Monthé (yellow card) 90+2'	Stadium: Field Mill; Attendance: 3,826; Referee: Carl Boyeson

19 August 2017 3	Forest Green Rovers	4–3	Yeovil Town	Nailsworth
15:00 BST	Doidge 23'; Brown 45+5'; Cooper 49' (yellow card) 90'; Monthé (yellow card) 59'; Bugiel 79'	Report	Olomola 9'; Khan 14' (pen.); Zoko 35'; James (yellow card) 69'	Stadium: The New Lawn; Attendance: 2,615; Referee: David Webb

26 August 2017 4	Colchester United	5–1	Forest Green Rovers	Colchester
15:00 BST	Reid 4'; Kent 21'; Szmodics 65'; Vincent-Young 74'; Senior 90+3'	Report	Noble 23'; Roberts (yellow card) 53'; Cooper (yellow card) 90+5'	Stadium: Colchester Community Stadium; Attendance: 3,047; Referee: Craig Hicks

2 September 2017 5	Wycombe Wanderers	3–1	Forest Green Rovers	High Wycombe
15:00 BST	El-Abd (yellow card) 2'; Cowan-Hall 7'; Stewart 22'; O'Nien 36' (yellow card) 82'	Report	Doidge 68'; Russell (yellow card) 70'	Stadium: Adams Park; Attendance: 3,759; Referee: Scott Oldham

9 September 2017 6	Forest Green Rovers	1–3	Exeter City	Nailsworth
15:00 BST	Mullings 75'; Bennett (yellow card) 83'	Report	Sweeney 4'; Reid 18', 53'; James (yellow card) 31'	Stadium: The New Lawn; Attendance: 2,909; Referee: Robert Lewis

12 September 2017 7	Forest Green Rovers	0–1	Lincoln City	Nailsworth
19:45 BST	Collins (yellow card) 26'; Cooper (yellow card) 60'	Report	Raggett (yellow card) 51'; Dickie (yellow card) 57'; Anderson 65'	Stadium: The New Lawn; Attendance: 1,887; Referee: Lee Swabey

16 September 2017 8	Port Vale	1–1	Forest Green Rovers	Burslem
15:00 BST	Turner 21'	Report	Bugiel 68'; Doidge (yellow card) 90+4'	Stadium: Vale Park; Attendance: 3,910; Referee: Martin Coy

22 September 2017 9	Forest Green Rovers	0–2	Swindon Town	Nailsworth
19:45 BST	Bennett (yellow card) 43'; Roberts (yellow card) 65'; Cooper (yellow card) 87'	Report	Robertson (yellow card) 58'; Lancashire 86'; Taylor 90'	Stadium: The New Lawn; Attendance: 3,305; Referee: Darren Drysdale

26 September 2017 10	Cambridge United	3–0	Forest Green Rovers	Cambridge
19:45 BST	Ibehre 15'; Ikpeazu 55', 61'	Report		Stadium: Abbey Stadium; Attendance: 3,545; Referee: Ross Joyce

30 September 2017 11	Forest Green Rovers	0–1	Accrington Stanley	Nailsworth
15:00 BST		Report	Conneely 56'; Thorniley (yellow card) 70'	Stadium: The New Lawn; Attendance: 2,594; Referee: John Busby

7 October 2017 12	Notts County	1–1	Forest Green Rovers	Nottingham
15:00 BST	Duffy (yellow card) 2'; Milsom (yellow card) 76' (goal) 90+6'	Report	Traoré (yellow card) 7'; Collins (yellow card) 19'; Bugiel 30'; Cooper (yellow card) 90+1'	Stadium: Meadow Lane; Attendance: 13,267; Referee: Lee Probert

14 October 2017 13	Forest Green Rovers	0–4	Newport County	Nailsworth
15:00 BST		Report	Amond 14', 41'; Bennett (yellow card) 50' (goal) 78'; Labadie (yellow card) 56'; McCoulsky 86'; White (yellow card) 90+4'	Stadium: The New Lawn; Attendance: 2,864; Referee: Carl Boyeson

17 October 2017 14	Coventry City	0–1	Forest Green Rovers	Coventry
19:45 BST	McDonald (yellow card) 23'; Doyle (yellow card) 45+1'; Nazon (yellow card) 79'; McNulty (yellow card) 90+1'	Report	Marsh-Brown 29'; Brown (yellow card) 90+2'	Stadium: Ricoh Arena; Attendance: 6,366; Referee: Simon Hooper

21 October 2017 15	Stevenage	1–2	Forest Green Rovers	Stevenage
15:00 BST	Smith (yellow card) 21'; Godden 43'; King (yellow card) 90+2'	Report	Brown 61'; Doidge 73'; Iacovitti (yellow card) 81'; Bennett (yellow card) 83'	Stadium: Broadhall Way; Attendance: 2,099; Referee: Lee Collins

28 October 2017 16	Forest Green Rovers	2–0	Morecambe	Nailsworth
15:00 BST	Marsh-Brown 30'; Laird 64'	Report	Conlan (yellow card) 45+3'; McGurk (yellow card) 85'	Stadium: The New Lawn; Attendance: 2,515; Referee: Charles Breakspear

11 November 2017 17	Crawley Town	1–1	Forest Green Rovers	Crawley
15:00 BST	Morris (yellow card) 37'; Connolly (yellow card) 42'; Payne (yellow card) 70'; Verheydt 79'	Report	Monthé (yellow card) 46'; Doidge 67'	Stadium: Broadfield Stadium; Attendance: 2,149; Referee: Tom Nield

18 November 2017 18	Forest Green Rovers	3–2	Crewe Alexandra	Nailsworth
15:00 GMT	Doidge 44', 83'; Traoré (yellow card) 66'; Bugiel (yellow card) 90+1'; Iacovitti 90+2'	Report	Porter 14'; Bowery 54'; Dagnall (yellow card) 67'; Grant (yellow card) 87'	Stadium: The New Lawn; Attendance: 2,221; Referee: Chris Sarginson

21 November 2017 19	Chesterfield	3–2	Forest Green Rovers	Chesterfield
19:45 GMT	McCourt 22', 54'; Dennis 81'	Report	Fitzwater (yellow card) 20'; Traoré (yellow card) 29'; Monthé (red card) 49'; Doidge 60', 90+3'	Stadium: Proact Stadium; Attendance: 4,306; Referee: Robert Jones

25 November 2017 20	Forest Green Rovers	1–1	Cheltenham Town	Nailsworth
15:00 GMT	Doidge 8'; Osbourne (yellow card) 38'; Bugiel (yellow card) 90+6'	Report	Pell (yellow card) 31'; Eisa 39'; Storer (yellow card) 75'; Dawson (yellow card) 90+6'; Morrell (yellow card) 90+7'	Stadium: The New Lawn; Attendance: 3,641; Referee: Scott Oldham

9 December 2017 21	Grimsby Town	1–0	Forest Green Rovers	Cleethorpes
15:00 GMT	Rose 39'; Summerfield (yellow card) 74'; Dembélé (yellow card) 76'; McKeown (yellow card) 90+1'	Report	Fitzwater (yellow card) 33' (yellow-red card) 37'; Roberts (yellow card) 64'	Stadium: Blundell Park; Attendance: 4,398; Referee: Carl Boyeson

16 December 2017 22	Forest Green Rovers	0–2	Luton Town	Nailsworth
15:00	Laird (yellow card) 81'; Doidge (yellow card) 90'	Report	Potts (yellow card) 20'; Mullins (yellow card) 22'; Sheehan 45+1'; Stacey (red card) 60'; Hylton 68'	Stadium: The New Lawn; Attendance: 2,546; Referee: (England) Lee Swabey

23 December 2017 23	Forest Green Rovers	0–1	Carlisle United	Nailsworth
15:00	Roberts (yellow card) 81'; Stevens (yellow card) 84'; Laird (yellow card) 90+4'	Report	Bennett 28'; Grainger (yellow card) 86'; Miller (yellow card) 90+4'	Stadium: The New Lawn; Attendance: 2,489; Referee: (England) Kevin Johnson

30 December 2017 24	Lincoln City	2–1	Forest Green Rovers	Lincoln
15:00	Rhead 8' 57'; Bostwick (yellow card) 62'	Report	Doidge 24'; Collins (yellow card) 25'	Stadium: Sincil Bank; Attendance: 8,964; Referee: (England) Martin Coy

1 January 2018 25	Forest Green Rovers	1–2	Wycombe Wanderers	Nailsworth
15:00	Osbourne (yellow card) 35'; Cooper (red card) 39'; Fitzwater 70'	Report	Bloomfield 26'; Saunders (yellow card) 40'; Mackail-Smith 42' de Havilland (yellow card) 67'; O'Nien (yellow card) 90+8'	Stadium: The New Lawn; Attendance: 2,727; Referee: (England) Anthony Coggins

6 January 2018 26	Forest Green Rovers	1–0	Port Vale	Nailsworth
15:00	Reid 61'	Report	Pope (yellow card) 82'	Stadium: The New Lawn; Attendance: 2,437; Referee: (England) Keith Stroud

13 January 2018 27	Swindon Town	1–0	Forest Green Rovers	Swindon
15:00	Dunne (yellow card) 45+7'; Anderson (yellow card) 59'; Norris 79'; Mullin (yellow card) 83'		Grubb (yellow card) 70'; Reid (yellow card) 87'; Wishart (yellow card) 87'; Gunning (yellow card) 90+3'	Stadium: County Ground; Attendance: 7,062; Referee: (England) Dean Whitestone

20 January 2018 28	Forest Green Rovers	5–2	Cambridge United	Nailsworth
15:00	Doidge 18' 82'; Grubb 43', 74'; Campbell 90+4'	Report	Maris 3'; Carroll (yellow card) 22'; Elito 25'; Ikpeazu (yellow card) 64'	Stadium: The New Lawn; Attendance: 2,228; Referee: (England) Ben Toner

27 January 2018 29	Carlisle United	1–0	Forest Green Rovers	Carlisle
15:00	Devitt 27'; Bonham (yellow card) 66'; Joyce (yellow card) 89'	Report	Bennett (yellow card) 41'; Gunning (yellow card) 60'; Collins (yellow card) 89'; Campbell (yellow card) 90+6'	Stadium: Brunton Park; Attendance: 4,176; Referee: (England) Eddie Ilderton

31 January 2018 30	Exeter City	2–0	Forest Green Rovers	Exeter
19:45	Stockley 51'; Sweeney 57' (pen.); Holmes (yellow card) 82'	Report	Gunning (yellow card) 67'; Collins (yellow card) 68'	Stadium: St James Park; Attendance: 3,382; Referee: (England) Brett Huxtable

3 February 2018 31	Forest Green Rovers	2–1	Coventry City	Nailsworth
15:00	Bray 39'; Collins 64'	Report	Kelly (yellow card) 38'; McNulty 59' (pen.)	Stadium: The New Lawn; Attendance: 3,623; Referee: (England) Darren Handley

10 February 2018	Newport County	Postponed	Forest Green Rovers	Newport
15:00				Stadium: Rodney Parade

13 February 2018 32	Forest Green Rovers	3–1	Stevenage	Nailsworth
19:45	Reid 45+1'; Wishart (yellow card) 54'; Osbourne (yellow card) 56'; Rawson 61'; Doidge 81'	Report	Wilkinson 26'; Revell (red card) 30'; Henry (yellow card) 50'; Bowditch (yellow card) 90+2'	Stadium: The New Lawn; Attendance: 1,825; Referee: Graham Salisbury

17 February 2018 33	Morecambe	1–1	Forest Green Rovers	Morecambe
15:00	McGowan (yellow card) 59'; Winnard (yellow card) 67'; Rose (yellow card) 84'; Conlan (yellow card) 89'; Wylde 90'	Report	Clements 13'; Grubb (yellow card) 78'	Stadium: Globe Arena; Attendance: 1,447; Referee: Anthony Backhouse

24 February 2018 34	Forest Green Rovers	2–0	Crawley Town	Nailsworth
15:00 GMT	Reid 10'; Doidge 24'; Osbourne (yellow card) 79'	Report	Yorwerth (yellow card) 36'; Connolly (yellow card) 90+5'	Stadium: The New Lawn; Attendance: 2,346; Referee: Andy Woolmer

6 March 2018 35	Newport County	3–3	Forest Green Rovers	Newport
19:45 GMT	Butler 9'; Hayes 17', 38'	Report	Butler 6' (o.g.); Gunning 30'; Collins 82'	Stadium: Rodney Parade; Attendance: 2,862; Referee: Chris Sarginson

10 March 2018 36	Forest Green Rovers	1–2	Notts County	Nailsworth
15:00 GMT	Campbell 72'; Collins (yellow card) 86'; Cooper (yellow card) 90+3'	Report	Noble 34' (yellow card) 89'; Tootle 80'; Duffy (yellow card) 87'	Stadium: The New Lawn; Attendance: 2,893; Referee: Mark Heywood

17 March 2018 37	Accrington Stanley	3–1	Forest Green Rovers	Accrington
15:00 GMT	Johnson 3'; Clark 81'; Jackson 90+2'	Report	Reid 64'	Stadium: Crown Ground; Attendance: 2,313; Referee: David Webb

20 March 2018 38	Crewe Alexandra	3–1	Forest Green Rovers	Crewe
19:45 GMT	Bowery 44' 61'; Kirk 59'	Report	Grubb 64'	Stadium: Gresty Road; Attendance: 3,158; Referee: Anthony Backhouse

24 March 2018 39	Forest Green Rovers	2–0	Mansfield Town	Nailsworth
15:00 GMT	Osbourne (yellow card) 28'; Bennett (yellow card) 36'; Reid 54', (yellow card) 73'; Campbell (yellow card) 72'; Grubb 78'	Report	Pearce (yellow card) 17' (yellow-red card) 84'; Atkinson (yellow card) 51'; Miller (yellow card) 65'	Stadium: The New Lawn; Attendance: 2,827; Referee: Antony Coggins

30 March 2018 P	Yeovil Town	Postponed	Forest Green Rovers	Yeovil
				Stadium: Huish Park

2 April 2018 40	Forest Green Rovers	1–2	Colchester United	Nailsworth
15:00 BST	Reid 37' (pen.)	Report	Dr. Wright 1'; Stevenson 47'	Stadium: The New Lawn; Attendance: 2,869; Referee: Brett Huxtable

7 April 2018 41	Barnet	1–0	Forest Green Rovers	Canons Park
15:00 BST	Nicholls 45+3', (yellow card) 48'; Akinde (yellow card) 50'; Payne (yellow card) 86'	Report	Osbourne (yellow card) 60'; Bennett (yellow card) 64'; Rawson (yellow card) 83'; Clements (yellow card) 84'	Stadium: The Hive Stadium; Attendance: 1,764; Referee: Nick Kinseley

14 April 2018 42	Cheltenham Town	0–1	Forest Green Rovers	Cheltenham
15:00 BST	Eisa (yellow card) 49'	Report	Gunning (yellow card) 40'; Doidge 43'; Clements (yellow card) 72'; Osbourne (yellow card) 90'	Stadium: Whaddon Road; Attendance: 4,744; Referee: Ollie Yates

21 April 2018 43	Forest Green Rovers	4–1	Chesterfield	Nailsworth
15:00 BST	Laird 27'; Doidge 78', 90+6' (pen.); Osbourne (yellow card) 80'; Gunning (yellow card) 86'; Grubb 90+4'	Report	Dennis 36' (pen.)	Stadium: The New Lawn; Attendance: 3,336; Referee: Scott Duncan

24 April 2018 44	Yeovil Town	0–0	Forest Green Rovers	Yeovil
19:45 BST		Report		Stadium: Huish Park; Attendance: 2,789; Referee: John Brooks

28 April 2018 45	Luton Town	3–1	Forest Green Rovers	Luton
15:00 BST	Collins (yellow card) 9'; Hylton 20' (yellow card) 25'; McCormack (yellow card) 59'; Lee 86'; Mpanzu 89' (yellow card) 90'	Report	Doidge 53'; Collins (yellow card) 66'; Gunning (yellow card) 90'	Stadium: Kenilworth Road; Attendance: 10,029; Referee: Lee Collins

5 May 2018 46	Forest Green Rovers	0–3	Grimsby Town	Nailsworth
15:00 BST	Gunning (yellow card) 19'	Report	Hooper 52', 84', 90'; Fox (yellow card) 67'	Stadium: The New Lawn; Attendance: 3,880; Referee: Seb Stockbridge

=== FA Cup ===
On 16 October 2017, Forest Green Rovers were drawn at home to Macclesfield Town in the first round. Another home tie was confirmed for the second round, against Exeter City.

4 November 2017 First round	Forest Green Rovers	1–0	Macclesfield Town	Nailsworth
15:00 GMT	Doidge 42'; Bennett (yellow card) 69'	Report	Baba (yellow card) 52'	Stadium: The New Lawn; Attendance: 1,387; Referee: Trevor Kettle

2 December 2017 Second round	Forest Green Rovers	3–3	Exeter City	Nailsworth
15:00 GMT	Doidge 26', 90+2'; Laird 88'	Report	Boateng (yellow card) 39'; Moore-Taylor 58'; Stockley 64', 90+4'	Stadium: The New Lawn; Attendance: 2,250; Referee: Gavin Ward

12 December 2017 Second round replay	Exeter City	2–1 (a.e.t.)	Forest Green Rovers	Exeter
19:45 GMT	Moore-Taylor (yellow card) 29'; Seaborne (yellow card) 50'; Tillson (yellow card) 56' (yellow-red card) 63'; Stockley (yellow card) 64' (goal) 115'; Harley 73' (pen.); Sweeney (yellow card) 90'; Taylor (yellow card) 105'	Report	Doidge 30' (pen.); Cooper (yellow card) 42'; Monthé (yellow card) 64' (yellow-red card) 109'; Bugiel (yellow card) 118'	Stadium: St James Park; Attendance: 2,923; Referee: Charles Breakspear

=== EFL Cup ===
On 16 June 2017, Forest Green Rovers were drawn at home to MK Dons in the first round.

8 August 2017 First round	Forest Green Rovers	0–1 (a.e.t.)	Milton Keynes Dons	Nailsworth
19:45 BST		Report	Cissé (yellow card) 28'; Ebanks-Landell (yellow card) 37'; Williams (yellow card) 45'; Ariyibi 110'; Downing (yellow card) 112'	Stadium: The New Lawn; Attendance: 1,608; Referee: Anthony Backhouse

=== EFL Trophy ===
On 12 July 2017, Forest Green Rovers were drawn in Southern Group E against Cheltenham Town, Newport County and Swansea City U23s. After finished as runners-up in the group stages, FGR were drawn away to Swindon Town in the second round. A third round trip to Yeovil Town was next on the cards after seeing off Swindon Town in the previous round.

Pos	Lge	Team	Pld	W	D	L	GF	GA	GD	Pts	Qualification
1	ACA	Swansea City U21s (Q)	3	3	0	0	6	2	+4	9	Round 2
2	L2	Forest Green Rovers (Q)	3	2	0	1	4	3	+1	6	Round 2
3	L2	Cheltenham Town (E)	3	1	0	2	4	5	−1	3	
4	L2	Newport County (E)	3	0	0	3	2	6	−4	0	

Updated to match(es) played on 31 October 2017. Source: EFL.com
(E) Eliminated; (Q) Qualified for the phase indicated

29 August 2017 Group Game 1	Forest Green Rovers	2–0	Newport County	Nailsworth
19:30 BST	Wishart 20'; Noble (yellow card) 60'; James 84'	Report	Willmott (yellow card) 45'; Owen-Evans (yellow card) 67'	Stadium: The New Lawn; Attendance: 1,090

3 October 2017 Group Game 2	Cheltenham Town	1–2	Forest Green Rovers	Cheltenham
19:45 BST	Bower (yellow card) 34'; Davey (yellow card) 39'; Hinds 50'; Cranston (yellow card) 70'; Wright (red card) 83'	Report	Brown 79' (yellow card) 90+2'; Stevens 80'	Stadium: Whaddon Road; Attendance: 1,576; Referee: Trevor Kettle

31 October 2017 Group Game 3	Forest Green Rovers	0–2	Swansea City U23s	Nailsworth
19:45 GMT		Report	Blair (yellow card) 11'; King 75'; Gorré 79'	Stadium: The New Lawn; Attendance: 590; Referee: Graham Horwood

5 December 2017 Second round	Swindon Town	0–1	Forest Green Rovers	Swindon
19:45 GMT	Anderson (yellow card) 53' (yellow-red card) 90+5'; Taylor (yellow card) 89'	Report	Bennett (yellow card) 28' (yellow-red card) 90+6'; Doidge 79'	Stadium: County Ground; Attendance: 1,320; Referee: Robert Lewis

9 January 2018 Third round	Yeovil Town	2-0	Forest Green Rovers	Yeovil
19:45 GMT	Smith 3'; Smith 26'; Sowunmi (yellow card) 57'; Zoko (yellow card) 88'	Report	Traoré (yellow card) 82'	Stadium: Huish Park; Attendance: 1,395; Referee: (England) John Busby

== Statistics ==
=== Appearances and goals ===
No.	Pos	Nat	Player	Total		League Two		FA Cup		EFL Cup		Football League Trophy	
No.	Pos	Nat	Player	Apps	Goals	Apps	Goals	Apps	Goals	Apps	Goals	Apps	Goals
Goalkeepers
1	GK	(England) ENG	Bradley Collins	16	0	15	0	0	0	0	0	1	0
23	GK	(England) ENG	Sam Russell	8	0	5	0	0	0	1	0	2	0
Defenders
2	DF	(England) ENG	Dale Bennett	22	0	19	0	0	0	1	0	2	0
3	DF	(Scotland) SCO	Scott Laird	21	1	16+2	1	0	0	0+1	0	2	0
5	DF	(England) ENG	Lee Collins	20	0	19	0	0	0	1	0	0	0
6	DF	(Cameroon) CMR	Manny Monthé	12	0	5+4	0	0	0	1	0	1+1	0
16	DF	(England) ENG	Jack Fitzwater	12	0	9	0	0	0	1	0	2	0
18	DF	(England) ENG	Callum Evans	1	0	1	0	0	0	0	0	0	0
20	DF	(Scotland) SCO	Alex Iacovitti	16	1	9+4	1	0	0	0	0	2+1	0
21	DF	(England) ENG	Mark Roberts	14	0	9+2	0	0	0	0	0	3	0
Midfielders
4	MF	(Ivory Coast) CIV	Drissa Traoré	22	0	16+2	0	0	0	0+1	0	3	0
7	MF	(England) ENG	Keanu Marsh-Brown	11	2	7+2	2	0	0	0+1	0	0+1	0
8	MF	(England) ENG	Liam Noble	11	1	9	1	0	0	1	0	1	0
10	MF	(England) ENG	Reece Brown	18	3	12+2	2	0	0	1	0	1+2	1
15	MF	(England) ENG	Charlie Cooper	16	1	13	1	0	0	1	0	2	0
19	MF	(England) ENG	Will Randall	8	0	5+2	0	0	0	0	0	1	0
34	MF	(England) ENG	Isaiah Osbourne	13	0	11+1	0	0	0	0	0	1	0
35	MF	(England) ENG	Jordan Stevens	4	1	0+2	0	0	0	0	0	0+2	1
Forwards
9	FW	(Wales) WAL	Christian Doidge	23	11	20	11	0	0	1	0	2	0
11	FW	(Lebanon) LBN	Omar Bugiel	18	3	3+13	3	0	0	0	0	1+1	0
14	FW	(England) ENG	Shamir Mullings	9	1	2+5	1	0	0	0+1	0	0+1	0
17	FW	(England) ENG	Dan Wishart	15	1	5+7	0	0	0	1	0	2	1
25	FW	(Portugal) POR	Toni Gomes	10	0	5+4	0	0	0	0	0	1	0
33	FW	(England) ENG	Luke James	15	1	7+4	0	0	0	1	0	3	1
Players transferred out during the season

Last updated: 30 November 2017
