= Bampton =

Bampton may refer to:

== Places ==
=== England ===
- Bampton, Cumbria
- Bampton, Devon
  - Bampton (Devon) railway station
  - Bampton Hundred
- Bampton, Oxfordshire

=== Other ===
- Bampton Island, former name of Parama Island, Papua New Guinea
- Bampton Reefs, Chesterfield Islands, New Caledonia

== People ==
- Danny Bampton (born 1980), Australian rugby league player
- Dave Bampton (born 1985), English footballer
- Debbie Bampton (born 1961), English footballer
- John Bampton (1690–1751), English churchman for whom the Bampton Lectures are named
- Mel Bampton, Australian radio announcer
- Peter Bampton, Australian footballer in the 1920s
- Rose Bampton (1907–2007), American opera singer

== Other ==
- Bampton Lectures, named after John Bampton
- Bampton Castle (disambiguation)
- Bampton Classical Opera, an opera company based in Bampton, Oxfordshire

== See also ==
- Brampton (disambiguation)
