= Omar Bugiel =

Footballer (born in 1994)

- Bugiel with Lebanon in 2024

Personal information
- Full name: Omar Khaled Chaaban
- Birth name: Omar Chaaban Khaled Bugiel
- Date of birth: 3 January 1994 (age 32)
- Place of birth: Berlin, Germany
- Height: 1.85 m (6 ft 1 in)
- Position: Striker

Team information
- Current team: Suzhou Dongwu
- Number: 14

Youth career
- 2005–2009: 1860 Munich
- 2010–2011: Chichester City

Senior career*
Years	Team	Apps	(Gls)
2011–2012	Selsey		
2012–2013	Burgess Hill Town		
2013	Selsey		
2013–2014	Bognor Regis Town		
2014–2017	Worthing	103	(45)
2017–2018	Forest Green Rovers	35	(8)
2018	→ Bromley (loan)	16	(4)
2018–2019	Bromley	32	(6)
2019–2023	Sutton United	141	(22)
2023–2026	AFC Wimbledon	119	(22)
2026–	Suzhou Dongwu	13	(2)

International career^{‡}
2017–	Lebanon	25	(2)
- * Club domestic league appearances and goals as of 7 November 2026 ‡ National team caps and goals as of 4 June 2026

Omar Khaled Chaaban (Note: In Lebanon his full name is Omar Khaled Chaaban, while in Germany his full name is Omar Chaaban Khaled Bugiel.) (Arabic: عمر خالد شعبان; born 3 January 1994), commonly known as Omar Bugiel, (Note: Known in his club career as Omar Bugiel (Arabic: عمر بوغيل), he plays as Omar Chaaban (Arabic: عمر شعبان) at the national-team level.) is a professional footballer who plays as a striker for Chinese club Suzhou Dongwu. Born in Germany, he plays for the Lebanon national team.

Bugiel began his senior career with Selsey in 2011 before spells at Burgess Hill Town, Bognor Regis Town, and Worthing, where he established himself as a prolific goalscorer. He joined Forest Green Rovers in 2017, helping the club gain promotion to the EFL League Two through the National League play-offs. After a season in the Football League, he joined Bromley, initially on loan before signing permanently, and moved to Sutton United in 2019, helping them win the National League title and earn promotion to League Two in 2021. He joined AFC Wimbledon in 2023 and helped the club secure promotion to EFL League One in 2025, before signing for Suzhou Dongwu in 2026.

Internationally, Bugiel made his debut for Lebanon in 2017 and represented the nation at the 2023 AFC Asian Cup.

== Early life ==
Bugiel was born in Berlin, Germany, to Lebanese father Khaled and a Polish mother Ewa. He holds dual German-Lebanese citizenship, having obtained a Lebanese passport in 2017.

Having initially began playing cageball, Bugiel moved to Munich aged 11, and joined the youth team of 1860 Munich; he was released by the club in 2009. He moved to England the following year aged 16 with the aim of learning English, and enrolled at Chichester College in Sussex.

Bugiel was tutored by one of Paul Hinshelwood's sons—also named Paul—who noticed Bugiel's football skills while playing five-a-side at the college. Bugiel lodged at Hinshelwood's house for two and a half years, while part of the youth team at Chichester City.

== Club career ==
=== Early career ===
Bugiel joined Selsey in 2011, coached by another one of Hinshelwood's sons (Adam). He played until 2013, including a one-year stint at Burgess Hill Town in 2012–13, before transferring to Bognor Regis Town.

In 2014, he moved Worthing, also coached by Adam Hinshelwood. He had prolific goalscoring form over four years at the Rebels, scoring 45 league goals in 103 appearances, and hitting double figures in each of his last three seasons.

=== Forest Green Rovers ===
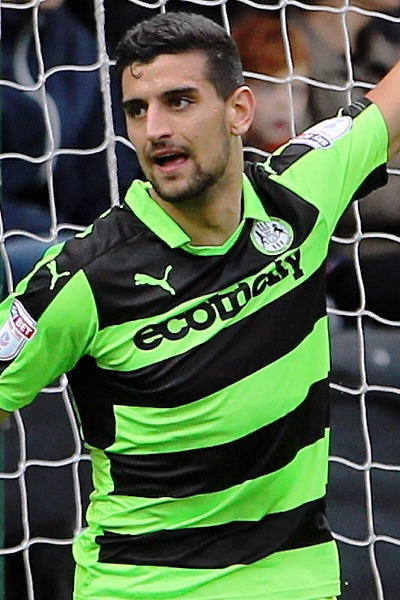
Bugiel celebrates after scoring a goal for Forest Green Rovers in 2017.

Bugiel was signed by Forest Green Rovers in February 2017 for an undisclosed fee. Bugiel scored a goal and made an assist on his debut on 11 February, in a 2–0 win over Boreham Wood. He was part of the Forest Green side that were victorious in the National League play-offs at the end of the season, helping them to promotion to the EFL League Two. He made his English Football League debut against Barnet on 5 August 2017, becoming the first Lebanese international to do so.

=== Bromley ===
On 4 January 2018, Bugiel joined National League side Bromley on loan for the remainder of the campaign. He scored in Bromley's 2017–18 FA Trophy final defeat to Brackley Town in Wembley. Bugiel was released by Forest Green at the end of the 2017–18 season. On 1 July 2018, it was announced that Bugiel signed for Bromley on a two-year contract.

=== Sutton United ===
==== 2019–20 season ====
On 3 June 2019, Sutton United announced the signing of Bugiel. He scored his first National League goal for the club on 26 October 2019, in a 3–2 home defeat to Ebbsfleet United. In December 2019, Bugiel scored in both the first round and the replay of the 2019–20 FA Trophy matches against Dagenham & Redbrige, with his team however failing to qualify to the next round. On 21 December 2019, Bugiel scored a hat-trick in the league against Wrexham in a 3–1 home win.

The next matchday, on Boxing Day, he scored a brace against Woking in a 2–0 away win in the league, with his first goal being a 25-yard volley in the first minute. Bugiel scored seven goals in the last four matches in all competitions. He ended the season with seven goals in 30 league games—10 in 34 in all competitions.

==== 2020–21 season ====
Bugiel scored his first goal of the 2020–21 season on 3 October 2020, against Maidenhead United, in a 3–0 win in the first matchday. His first assist of the season came on 27 October, helping his side win 2–1 away from home to Yeovil Town. Bugiel scored in two consecutive matchdays, on 17 and 21 November, against Dagenham & Redbridge and Wealdstone respectively. He scored five league goals in 37 games, and helped Sutton United finish first in the National League, gaining promotion to the EFL League Two.

==== 2021–2023 ====
On the opening day of the 2021–22 EFL League Two season, Bugiel scored Sutton's first-ever Football League goal, a header against his former-side Forest Green to level the scores; the match eventually ended in a 2–1 defeat.

On 30 July 2022, Bugiel scored in the first matchday of the 2022–23 EFL League Two, in a 1–1 draw against Newport County; he scored on the opening day of the season for Sutton in all four seasons at the club.

He was released at the end of the 2022–23 season.

=== AFC Wimbledon ===
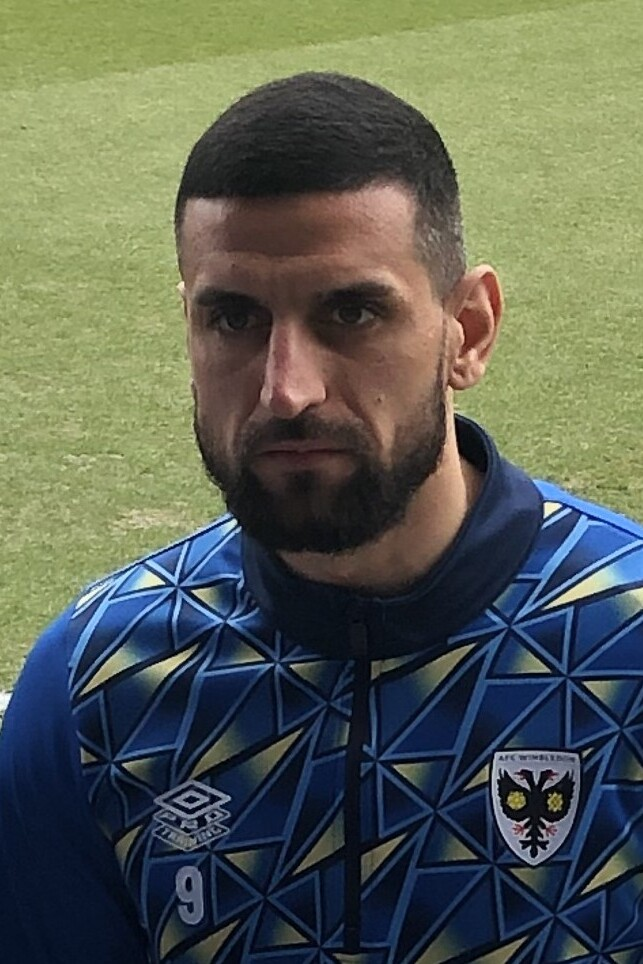
Bugiel prior to a match with AFC Wimbledon in 2025

On 1 June 2023, League Two side AFC Wimbledon announced the signing of Bugiel, with the contract becoming valid from 1 July. He scored his first goal for Wimbledon in a 2–1 win over Coventry City in the EFL Cup on 9 August 2023. On 12 April 2024, Bugiel signed a new two-year contract with Wimbledon. On 27 April 2024, Bugiel scored a hat-trick and provided an assist in a 5–1 victory over Walsall. He helped AFC Wimbledon gain promotion to the EFL League One for the 2025–26 season.

On 27 September 2025, Bugiel scored and assisted in the Dons's 2–1 win over Wycombe Wanderers in the 2025–26 EFL League One. On 29 June 2026, Bugiel departed the club following the expiration of his contract. He scored 28 goals in 142 appearances in all competitions across three seasons.

=== Suzhou Dongwu ===
On 3 July 2026, Bugiel joined China League One side Suzhou Dongwu as a free agent. He scored his first goal on 8 August, helping his side win 2–1 against Changchun Yatai.

== International career ==
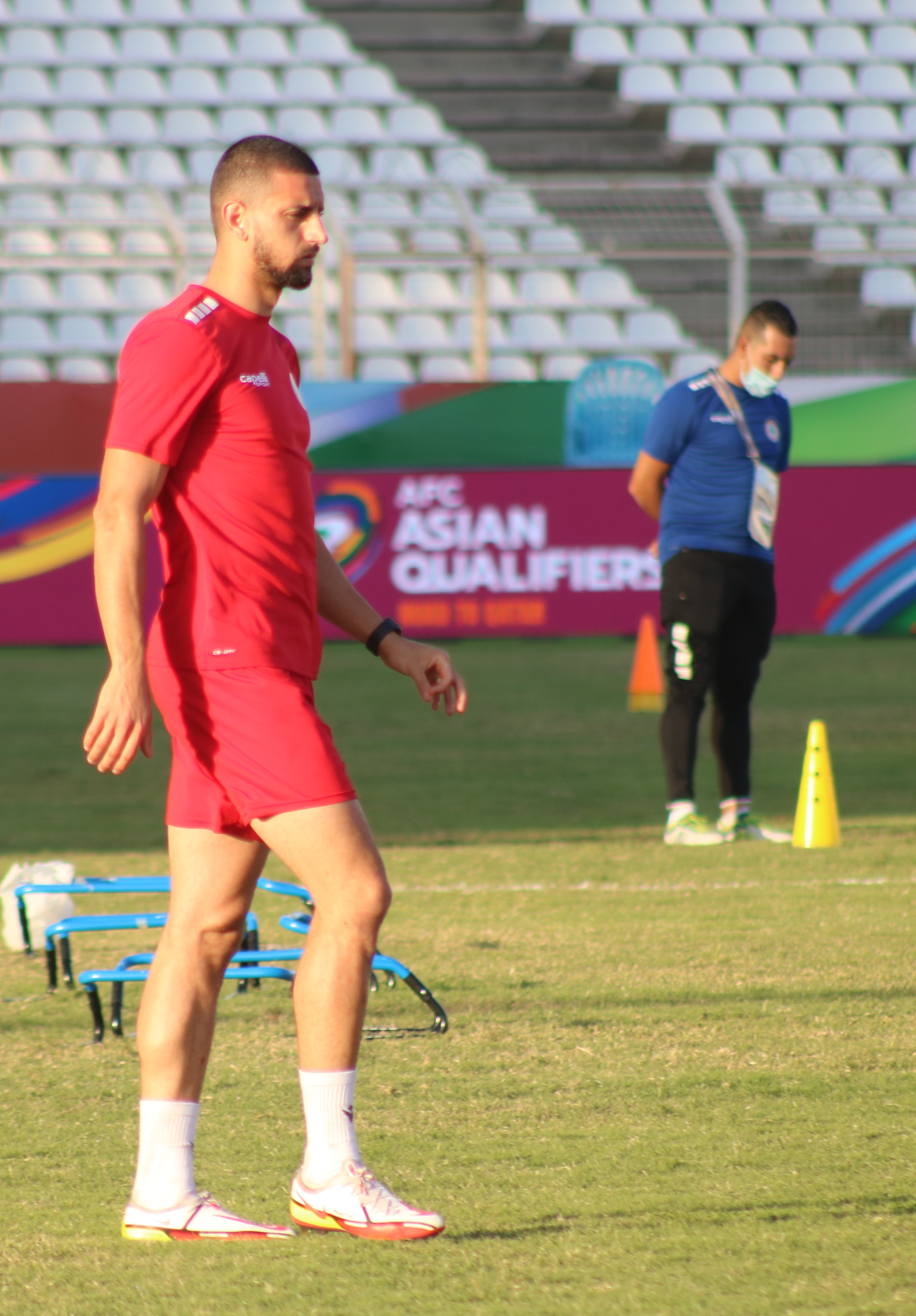
Bugiel training with the Lebanon national team in 2021

Eligible to play for the Lebanon national team through his father, Bugiel was spotted by Lebanon manager Miodrag Radulović following his goalscoring form at Forest Green. He obtained a Lebanese passport in 2017 to represent the national team.

Bugiel was first called up in May 2017 for an AFC Asian Cup qualifier against Malaysia, but did not feature in the 2–1 win. Bugiel was called up again for the next qualifier in North Korea on 5 September 2017. He made his debut for Lebanon on 9 November 2017, coming on as a substitute in a 1–0 victory over Singapore. Bugiel's first goal also came as a substitute, scoring the lone goal in a friendly against Jordan on 6 September 2018.

In December 2023, Bugiel was included in the Lebanese squad for the 2023 AFC Asian Cup.

== Personal life ==
Bugiel's uncle, Kida Khodr Ramadan, is a Lebanese-born German actor.

== Career statistics ==
=== Club ===
As of match played 7 November 2026

Appearances and goals by club, season and competition
Club	Season	League			National cup (Note: Includes FA Cup, Chinese FA Cup)		League cup (Note: Includes EFL Cup)		Other		Total	
Club	Season	Division	Apps	Goals	Apps	Goals	Apps	Goals	Apps	Goals	Apps	Goals
Worthing	2013–14	Isthmian League Division One South	12	4	0	0	—		0	0	12	4
Worthing	2014–15	Isthmian League Division One South	31	12	3	0	—		3 (Note: Appearances in FA Trophy)	0	37	12
Worthing	2015–16	Isthmian League Division One South	31	14	4	2	—		2	1	37	17
Worthing	2016–17	Isthmian League Division One South	29	15	3	5	—		8 (Note: Seven appearances one goal in FA Trophy, one appearance in Alan Turvey Trophy)	1	40	21
Worthing	Total		103	45	10	7	—		13	2	126	54
Forest Green Rovers	2016–17	National League	16	5	—		—		1 (Note: Appearance in National League play-offs)	0	17	5
Forest Green Rovers	2017–18	League Two	19	3	3	0	0	0	2 (Note: Appearances in EFL Trophy)	0	24	3
Forest Green Rovers	Total		35	8	3	0	0	0	3	0	41	8
Bromley (loan)	2017–18	National League	16	4	—		—		6	1	22	5
Bromley	2018–19	National League	32	6	2	0	—		0	0	34	6
Sutton United	2019–20	National League	30	7	2	1	—		2	2	34	10
Sutton United	2020–21	National League	37	5	1	0	—		2	1	40	6
Sutton United	2021–22	League Two	39	4	2	0	1	0	4	0	46	4
Sutton United	2022–23	League Two	35	6	0	0	1	0	3	0	39	6
Sutton United	Total		141	22	5	1	2	0	11	3	159	26
AFC Wimbledon	2023–24	League Two	41	13	2	0	2	1	3	0	48	14
AFC Wimbledon	2024–25	League Two	39	4	2	1	3	1	3 (Note: Two appearances and one goal in EFL Trophy, one appearance in League Two play-offs)	1	47	7
AFC Wimbledon	2025–26	League One	39	5	1	0	2	1	5	1	47	7
AFC Wimbledon	Total		119	22	5	1	7	3	11	2	142	28
Suzhou Dongwu	2026	China League One	13	2	0	0	—		—		13	2
Career total			459	109	25	9	9	3	44	8	537	129

=== International ===
As of match played 4 June 2026

Appearances and goals by national team and year
National team	Year	Apps	Goals
Lebanon	2017	1	0
Lebanon	2018	4	1
Lebanon	2019	2	0
Lebanon	2020	0	0
Lebanon	2021	3	0
Lebanon	2022	0	0
Lebanon	2023	0	0
Lebanon	2024	11	0
Lebanon	2025	3	1
Lebanon	2026	1	0
Total		25	2

Scores and results list Lebanon's goal tally first, score column indicates score after each Bugiel goal.

List of international goals scored by Omar Bugiel
No.	Date	Venue	Opponent	Score	Result	Competition	Ref.
1	6 September 2018	King Abdullah II Stadium, Amman, Jordan	Jordan	1–0	1–0	Friendly	
2	18 November 2025	Hassanal Bolkiah National Stadium, Bandar Seri Begawan, Brunei	Brunei	3–0	3–0	2027 Asian Cup qualification	

== Honours ==
Forest Green Rovers

- National League play-offs: 2017

Bromley

- FA Trophy runner-up: 2017–18

Sutton United

- National League: 2020–21
- EFL Trophy runner-up: 2021–22

AFC Wimbledon

- EFL League Two play-offs: 2025

== See also ==
- List of Lebanon international footballers born outside Lebanon
