= Dave Bampton =

English footballer

Personal information
- Full name: David Peter Bampton
- Date of birth: 5 May 1985 (age 41)
- Place of birth: Swindon, England
- Position: Midfielder

Team information
- Current team: Royal Wootton Bassett Town

Youth career
- 2001–2004: Swindon Town

Senior career*
Years	Team	Apps	(Gls)
2002–2004	Swindon Town	3	(0)
2004–2008	Tamworth	108	(8)
2008–2009	Worcester City		
2010–	Swindon Supermarine	102	(6)
2021–	Royal Wootton Bassett Town		
- * Club domestic league appearances and goals as of 22:54, 8 August 2013 (UTC)

David Peter Bampton (born 5 May 1985) is an English footballer who plays as a midfielder. He played in the Football League for Swindon Town. He is with Swindon Supermarine.

== Playing career ==
=== Swindon Town ===
Bampton joined his local side Swindon Town as a trainee in 2001 and was the captain of the club's youth team, the following season he was given a professional contract with the club.

Bampton drifted his way into the first team squad on occasions during the 2002/03 season. Bampton made his first-team debut as a substitute in the 1–0 defeat at Oxford United in an FA Cup tie on 8 December 2002.

In total Bampton made three League One appearances, coming on as a substitute in all three, he made two appearances against home and away to Plymouth Argyle and one at home against Luton Town, but after failing to make a single appearance during 2003/04, Bampton was released at the end of that season.

=== Tamworth ===
On 9 May 2005 Mark Cooper made Bampton one of his first signings, after taking over as manager of Conference National side Tamworth for the 2005/06 season. Bampton proved himself to be very much a utility player slotting into defence or midfield as required, and has made himself somewhat a fans favourite with his never say die displays. Bampton also played a major part in the club's historic highest ever league finish, when the club finished 15th, during his first season he made 22 appearances, scoring one goal.

Bampton agreed another one-year deal for the 2005/06 season, and continued to show some very impressive displays for the Conference club, most noticeably on a bigger stage in the FA Cup ties against Stoke City. Bampton made 24 appearances again finding the net once.

Bampton continued to show his loyalty to Tamworth overlooking other offers to sign a further one-year contract with the club. Bampton's performances prompted England non-league national manager Paul Fairclough, but cruelly for Bampton injury prevented him from making his debut. Unfortunatately for Bampton the 2006/07 season was dogged by injury, limiting him to only nine appearances.

On 2 July 2007 it was confirmed that Bampton arrived for pre-season training with Tamworth and was in discussion over terms of a new offer of a contact for the 2007/08 season, and it is believed that Bampton will commit to the club, despite the club's relegation to the Conference North.

On 5 July 2007, local newspaper Tamworth Herald reported that Bampton had signed a deal with Tamworth in time for the 2007/08 season.
