= Rob Sinclair (footballer, born 1989) =

English association football player (born 1989)

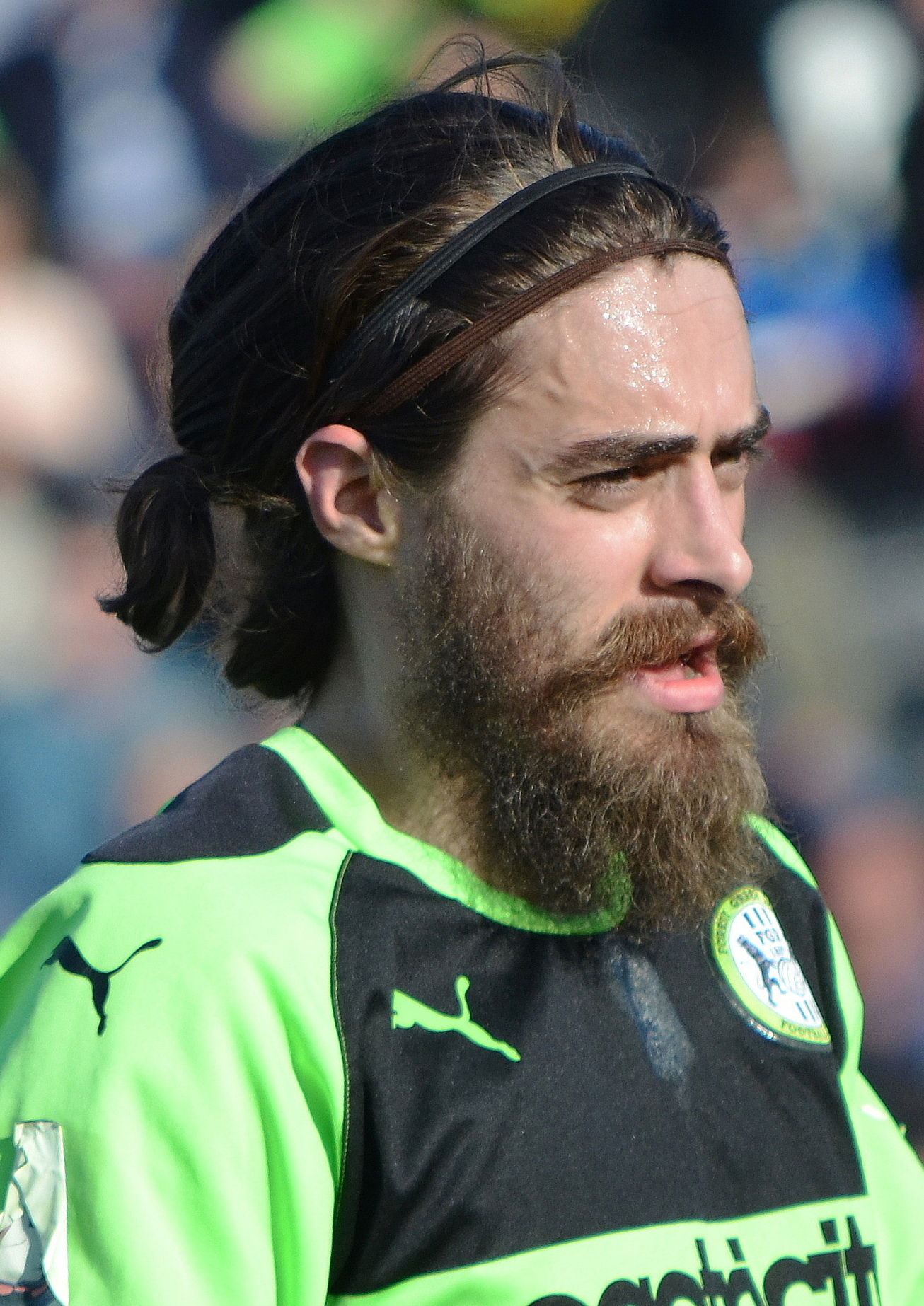
- Sinclair playing for Forest Green Rovers in 2016

Personal information
- Full name: Robert James Sinclair
- Date of birth: 29 August 1989 (age 37)
- Place of birth: Bedford, England
- Height: 5 ft 10 in (1.78 m)
- Position: Midfielder

Team information
- Current team: Real Bedford (manager)

Youth career
- 2006–2007: Luton Town

Senior career*
Years	Team	Apps	(Gls)
2007–2008	Luton Town	0	(0)
2008	→ Salisbury City (loan)	16	(1)
2008–2010	Salisbury City	38	(1)
2010–2012	Stevenage	27	(2)
2012	→ Aldershot Town (loan)	4	(0)
2012–2013	Stevenage	0	(0)
2012–2013	→ Aldershot Town (loan)	6	(0)
2013–2014	Salisbury City	37	(2)
2014–2017	Forest Green Rovers	100	(3)
2017–2018	Oxford City	42	(10)
2018–2020	Hemel Hempstead Town	24	(4)
2020–2021	Bedford Town	7	(0)
Total		301	(23)

Managerial career
- 2021–2022: Eynesbury Rovers
- 2022–: Real Bedford
- * Club domestic league appearances and goals as of 10:17, 25 July 2025 (UTC)

Robert James Sinclair (born 29 August 1989) is an English football manager and former professional footballer who is the manager of Southern League Premier Division Central club Real Bedford. He played as a midfielder.

Sinclair began his footballing career in the youth system at Luton Town, signing a professional contract in July 2007, and spent time on loan at Salisbury City before joining the club permanently. He joined Stevenage of League Two in June 2010, contributing to the club's promotion to League One, and had loan spells at Aldershot Town. Sinclair returned to Salisbury City for a second spell in January 2013, helping the team gain promotion to the Conference Premier, before signing for Forest Green Rovers and playing a part in their promotion to the Football League during the 2016–17 season.

He later played semi-professionally for Oxford City, Hemel Hempstead Town, and Bedford Town. After retiring from playing in 2021, Sinclair moved into coaching, joining Dunstable Town as a first-team coach in October 2021 before being appointed as manager of Eynesbury Rovers later that month. He was appointed manager of Real Bedford in May 2022, leading the club to three consecutive promotions following successive title-winning seasons.

== Early life ==
Sinclair was born and raised in Bedford. He attended Wootton Upper School. He has three brothers, Stuart, Scott, and Andrew, all of whom played football at either a professional or semi-professional level.

== Career ==
=== Early career ===
Sinclair began his career as a trainee with Luton Town and was a regular in the club's under-18 and reserve teams, where he played primarily as a right winger. He progressed through the youth system at Luton and signed a one-year professional contract in July 2007. Sinclair was loaned to Conference Premier club Salisbury City on 31 January 2008. He made his debut in a 1–0 victory against Northwich Victoria on 9 February 2008 and scored his first senior goal in a 3–2 defeat away to Woking on 24 March 2008. Sinclair made 16 appearances and scored once during his three-month loan spell, which he described as valuable first-team experience. He was released by Luton in May 2008 without making a senior appearance for the club.

=== Salisbury City ===
Following his release from Luton, Sinclair joined Salisbury on a permanent basis, signing a two-year contract on 22 May 2008. Manager Nick Holmes noted that Sinclair had impressed during his loan spell and would play a significant role in the squad. He sustained a knee injury in a pre-season friendly against Port Vale, which sidelined him for the opening two months of the 2008–09 season. He returned on 18 October 2008, starting in a 2–0 defeat to Stevenage Borough. Sinclair's only goal of the season came on 26 April 2009, scoring from long range in a 2–2 draw with Ebbsfleet United. He made 15 appearances in all competitions that season, scoring once. In the 2009–10 season, Sinclair featured 29 times without scoring. He left the club in June 2010 when Salisbury were relegated two divisions following a breach of Conference regulations relating to unpaid debts.

=== Stevenage ===
Sinclair signed for League Two club Stevenage on 4 June 2010. He stated that the move arose unexpectedly, as Salisbury's financial uncertainty had prevented them from offering new contracts. He made his debut in the club's first Football League fixture, a 2–2 draw against Macclesfield Town on 7 August 2010, appearing as a 71st-minute substitute. Two days later, he made his first start, playing 75 minutes in a 2–1 League Cup defeat to Portsmouth. Sinclair scored his first goals for the club on 26 March 2011, scoring twice in Stevenage's 4–0 victory away to Macclesfield Town. A groin injury sustained in training after Stevenage's 3–3 draw with Bury ruled him out of the club's play-off matches, in which they secured promotion to League One. He finished the season with 31 appearances and two goals.

The injury sidelined Sinclair for the first half of the 2011–12 season. He later stated that complications had arisen, including his tendon detaching from the bone by two centimetres, which also prevented medical staff from administering injections. Having made no first-team appearances for Stevenage that season, he joined League Two club Aldershot Town on a one-month loan on 13 March 2012 to regain match fitness. He made his debut the same day as an 85th-minute substitute in a 2–2 draw away to Crawley Town. Sinclair made four appearances during the loan spell, three as a substitute, before returning to Stevenage on 9 April 2012. He did not feature for the first team for the remainder of the season.

In June 2012, Sinclair left Stevenage despite being offered a one-year contract extension, stating that he wanted to play first-team football rather than be used sparingly. However, he rejoined the club on a one-year contract in early September 2012. Having not featured during the opening months of the 2012–13 season, he joined Aldershot Town on 6 November 2012 for a second loan spell, initially for one month before the arrangement was extended for a further month. Sinclair made seven appearances during the loan before returning to Stevenage, where he did not play for the first team again.

=== Return to Salisbury City ===
Sinclair returned to Salisbury City, with the club competing in the Conference South, on 31 January 2013 following his release from Stevenage by mutual consent. The move reunited him with his brother, Stuart Sinclair, for the first time in his professional career. He scored on his first appearance after returning to the club, coming on as a 57th-minute substitute and scoring Salisbury's second goal in a 3–1 home victory against Bromley on 2 February 2013. He featured regularly during the second half of the 2012–13 season, making 19 appearances and scoring twice as Salisbury secured promotion to the Conference Premier via the play-offs.

Ahead of the 2013–14 season, Sinclair signed a one-year contract extension to remain at Salisbury for their return to the Conference Premier. He started in the club's first game back in the highest tier of non-League football, a 1–0 defeat to Tamworth at the Raymond McEnhill Stadium on 10 August 2013. He missed four months of the season through injury, returning to the first team in January 2014. Sinclair made 21 appearances during the season as Salisbury finished mid-table, but the club were relegated due to financial irregularities.

=== Forest Green Rovers ===
In June 2014, Sinclair was one of three Salisbury players to join Conference Premier club Forest Green Rovers, signing a two-year contract. He made his debut on the opening day of the 2014–15 season, playing the full match in a 1–0 away victory at Southport on 9 August 2014. He scored his first goal for the club in a 2–1 home defeat to Barnet at The New Lawn on 27 September 2014. Sinclair's performances during October 2014 earned him the Conference Premier Player of the Month award. He made 46 appearances, scoring three goals, as Forest Green were defeated 3–0 on aggregate by Bristol Rovers in the play-off semi-finals.

Sinclair made 42 appearances during the 2015–16 season. He played in both legs of the play-off semi-final victory over Dover Athletic, but missed the National League play-off final defeat to Grimsby Town at Wembley Stadium through injury. He signed a new two-year contract at the end of the season.

During the 2016–17 season, Sinclair was a regular in the first half of the season but featured less frequently after sustaining an injury. He made just one appearance in the final two months of the season and missed the club's play-off matches, as Forest Green earned promotion to the Football League for the first time. He made 22 appearances during the season.

=== Oxford City ===
Having not made any appearances for Forest Green in the opening weeks of the 2017–18 season, Sinclair joined National League South club Oxford City on a free transfer on 25 August 2017, despite interest from National League clubs Barrow and Wrexham. He made his debut the following day, scoring the opening goal in a 1–1 home draw with Welling United. Sinclair was part of the Oxford City squad that reached the FA Cup second round for the second time in the club's history, playing the full match in a 1–0 away win over League Two club Colchester United on 4 November 2017. He also scored in the subsequent round, a 3–2 defeat to Notts County at Meadow Lane on 2 December 2017. Sinclair scored three goals in five matches during December, earning the National League South Player of the Month award. He featured in the final as Oxford City won the Oxfordshire Senior Cup with a 5–3 victory over Kidlington on 1 May 2018. He finished the season with 40 appearances in all competitions, scoring 10 goals.

He remained at Oxford City for the start of the 2018–19 season, scoring his first goal of the campaign in a 1–0 victory against eventual champions Torquay United on 14 August 2018. Sinclair scored four goals in 12 appearances during the opening three months of the season, including two in a 5–0 FA Cup victory against Hemel Hempstead Town on 23 October 2018. He left the club by mutual consent on 2 November 2018, with Oxford City citing a change in personal circumstances as the reason for his departure. He made 52 appearances and scored 14 goals during his tenure at the club.

=== Hemel Hempstead Town ===
Following his departure from Oxford City, Sinclair joined fellow National League South club Hemel Hempstead Town on 5 November 2018. The move reunited him with manager Joe Deeney, who had recently left his role as assistant manager at Oxford City and made Sinclair his second signing since his appointment. Sinclair made his Hemel debut in the club's 2–1 home victory against Gloucester City on 10 November 2018, scoring the opening goal of the match. Sinclair scored four goals in his first six matches, including two second-half strikes in a comeback win at East Thurrock United on 17 November 2018. He missed two months of the season due to injury, returning for Hemel's final two league matches. He finished the season with 14 appearances and four goals. In April 2019, Sinclair turned down the opportunity to become manager at Weston-super-Mare.

=== Bedford Town ===
Sinclair joined Southern League Division One Central club Bedford Town on 16 July 2020, signing a one-year contract. He debuted for his hometown club in a 1–0 defeat to Daventry Town in the FA Cup preliminary round on 12 September 2020. Sinclair made nine appearances during the 2020–21 season before the season was curtailed due to restrictions associated with the COVID-19 pandemic.

== Managerial career ==
=== Eynesbury Rovers ===
After a period as first-team coach at Dunstable Town, Sinclair was appointed manager of Eynesbury Rovers in the United Counties League Premier Division South on 18 October 2021. The club finished in ninth place in the 2021–22 season.

=== Real Bedford ===
Sinclair left Eynesbury to become first-team manager at Spartan South Midlands Football League Division One club Real Bedford on 10 May 2022. In his first season, he led the club to the Division One title with 99 points and the Bedfordshire Senior Trophy, defeating Elstow Abbey 6–0 in the final. Real Bedford won the Spartan South Midlands Football League Premier Division title and Premier Division Cup in 2023–24, before winning the Southern League Division One Central title in 2024–25. Sinclair therefore led the club to three consecutive league titles, with Real Bedford losing six of 116 league matches during the three seasons. He signed a new two-year contract in June 2025.

In the 2025–26 season, Sinclair's fourth as manager, Real Bedford finished in third place in the Southern League Premier Division Central and qualified for the play-offs, where they lost to Spalding United in the final. In July 2026, the club won the Bedfordshire Senior Challenge Trophy, defeating Bedford Town in front of 2,383 spectators in the first meeting between the clubs.

== Style of play ==
Although Sinclair began his career as a winger, he was predominantly deployed as a central midfielder throughout the majority of his professional career. Following his signing in June 2014, Forest Green manager Adrian Pennock described him as "a very intelligent footballer", and praised his work ethic, stating: "his work ethic is fantastic and he works extremely hard for the team. He's very clever with the ball, he finds space very easily and creates opportunities". During his playing career, Sinclair was frequently characterised as both combative and cultured in his style of play.

== Personal life ==
He established Sinclair Sports Coaching in 2017, a company that provides coaching in a variety of sports, as well as delivering curriculum physical education programmes and extracurricular clubs in schools.

== Career statistics ==
Appearances and goals by club, season and competition
Club	Season	League			FA Cup		League Cup		Other^{[A]}		Total	
Club	Season	Division	Apps	Goals	Apps	Goals	Apps	Goals	Apps	Goals	Apps	Goals
Luton Town	2007–08	League One	0	0	0	0	0	0	0	0	0	0
Salisbury City	2007–08	Conference Premier	16	1	0	0	—		0	0	16	1
Salisbury City	2008–09	Conference Premier	14	1	1	0	—		0	0	15	1
Salisbury City	2009–10	Conference Premier	23	0	3	0	—		4 (Note: Appearance(s) in FA Trophy)	0	31	0
Salisbury City	Total		54	2	4	0	0	0	4	0	62	2
Stevenage	2010–11	League Two	27	2	2	0	1	0	1 (Note: Appearance in Football League Trophy)	0	31	2
Stevenage	2011–12	League One	0	0	0	0	0	0	0	0	0	0
Stevenage	2012–13	League One	0	0	0	0	0	0	0	0	0	0
Stevenage	Total		27	2	2	0	1	0	1	0	31	2
Aldershot Town (loan)	2011–12	League Two	4	0	0	0	0	0	0	0	4	0
Aldershot Town (loan)	2012–13	League Two	6	0	1	0	0	0	0	0	7	0
Aldershot Town (loan)	Total		10	0	1	0	0	0	0	0	11	0
Salisbury City	2012–13	Conference South	16	2	0	0	—		3 (Note: Appearances in 2013 Conference South play-offs)	0	19	2
Salisbury City	2013–14	Conference Premier	21	0	0	0	—		0	0	21	0
Salisbury City	Total		37	2	0	0	0	0	3	0	40	2
Forest Green Rovers	2014–15	Conference Premier	41	3	2	0	—		3 (Note: One appearance in FA Trophy; two appearances in 2015 Conference Premier play-offs)	0	46	3
Forest Green Rovers	2015–16	National League	37	0	3	0	—		2 (Note: Two appearances in 2016 National League play-offs)	0	42	0
Forest Green Rovers	2016–17	National League	22	0	0	0	—		3	0	25	0
Forest Green Rovers	2017–18	League Two	0	0	0	0	0	0	0	0	0	0
Forest Green Rovers	Total		100	3	5	0	0	0	8	0	113	3
Oxford City	2017–18	National League South	33	8	5	2	—		2 (Note: One appearance in FA Trophy; one appearance in Oxfordshire Senior Cup)	0	40	10
Oxford City	2018–19	National League South	9	2	3	2	—		0	0	12	4
Oxford City	Total		42	10	8	4	0	0	2	0	52	14
Hemel Hempstead Town	2018–19	National League South	12	4	0	0	—		2	0	14	4
Hemel Hempstead Town	2019–20	National League South	12	0	0	0	—		8 (Note: Two appearances in FA Trophy; two appearances in Herts Charity Cup; four appearances in Herts Senior Cup)	0	20	0
Hemel Hempstead Town	Total		24	4	0	0	0	0	10	0	34	4
Bedford Town	2020–21	Southern League Division One Central	7	0	1	0	—		1	0	9	0
Career totals			301	23	21	4	1	0	29	0	352	27

== Managerial statistics ==
As of match played 12 September 2026

Managerial record by team and tenure
Team	From	To	Record					Ref.
Team	From	To	P	W	D	L	Win %	Ref.
Eynesbury Rovers	18 October 2021	10 May 2022	27	9	5	13	33.3	
Real Bedford	10 May 2022	Present	205	151	30	24	73.7	
Total			232	160	35	37	69.0	

== Honours ==
=== As a player ===
Stevenage

- Football League Two play-offs: 2011

Salisbury City

- Conference South play-offs: 2013

Forest Green Rovers

- National League play-offs: 2017

Oxford City

- Oxfordshire Senior Cup: 2017–18

Individual

- Conference Premier Player of the Month: October 2014
- National League South Player of the Month: December 2017

=== As a manager ===
Real Bedford

- Southern Football League Division One Central: 2024–25
- Spartan South Midlands Football League Premier Division: 2023–24
- Spartan South Midlands Football League Premier Division Cup: 2023–24
- Spartan South Midlands Football League Division One: 2022–23
- Bedfordshire Senior Trophy: 2022–23
- Bedfordshire Senior Challenge Cup: 2025–26
