= Bampton Castle =

Bampton Castle may refer to:

- Bampton Castle, Devon
- Bampton Castle, Oxfordshire
- RAF Bampton Castle

== See also ==
- Bampton (disambiguation)
