= Brampton (Orange, Virginia) =

Historic house in Virginia, United States

- U.S. National Register of Historic Places
- Virginia Landmarks Register
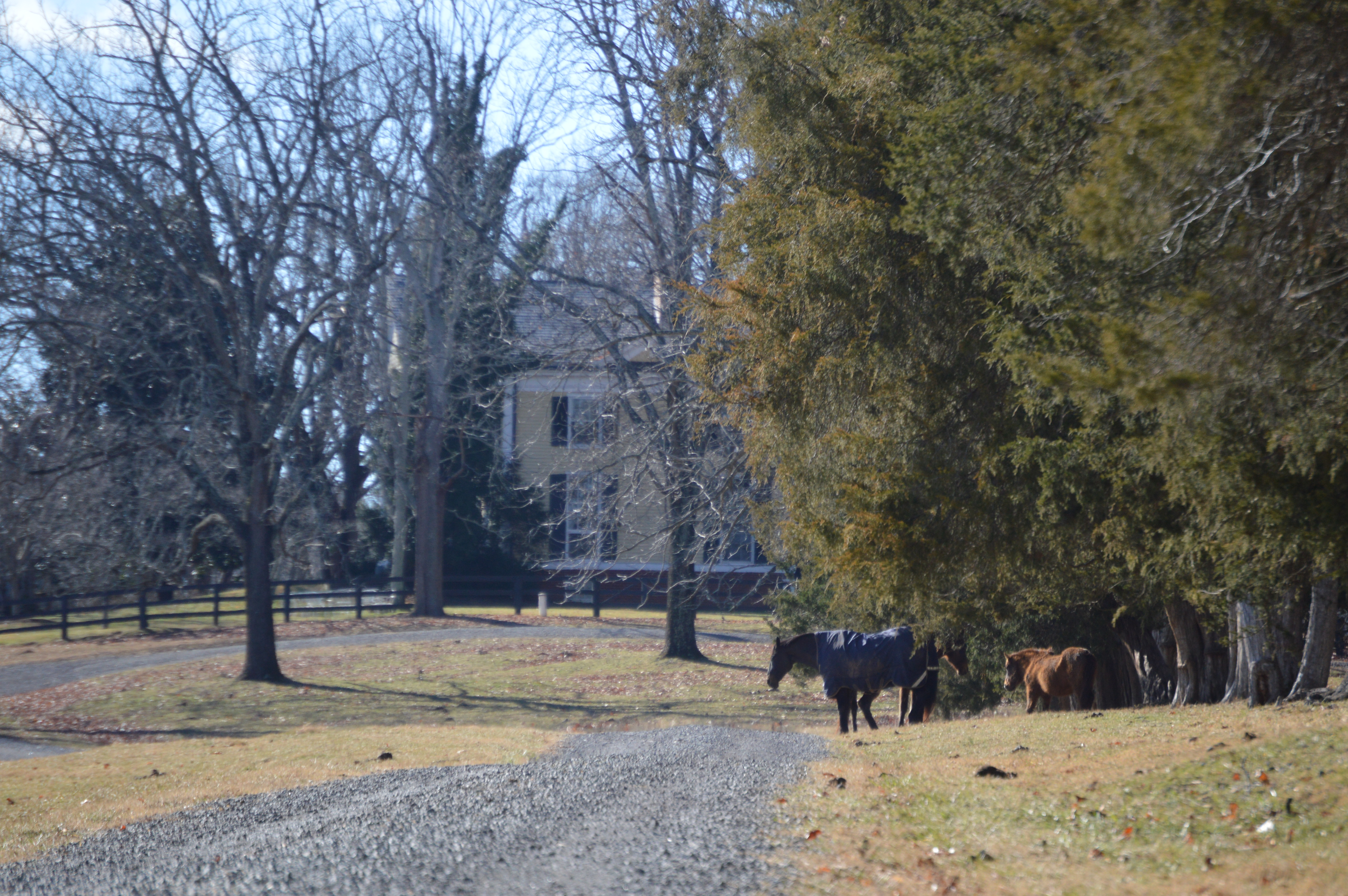
- Distant view from the north

- Location within Virginia Location within the United States
- Location: VA 671, near Orange, Virginia
- Coordinates: 38°17′56″N 78°06′41″W
- Area: 11.3 acres (4.6 ha)
- Built: 1846
- Architectural style: Greek Revival
- NRHP reference No.: 85003350
- VLR No.: 056-0001

Significant dates
- Added to NRHP: December 12, 1985
- Designated VLR: October 15, 1985

Brampton, also known as Buena Vista Farm, is a historic home located near Orange, in Madison County, Virginia. It was built about 1846, as a two-bay, side passage plan with a flat roof, two-story portico, and a small wing. It is a temple-form Greek Revival-style residence. A rear addition was built about 1900, and the front portico was redesigned with a pedimented form. Also on the property are the contributing brick kitchen, smokehouse, and dairy.

It was listed on the National Register of Historic Places in 1985.
