= Dale Bennett =

English footballer (born 1990)

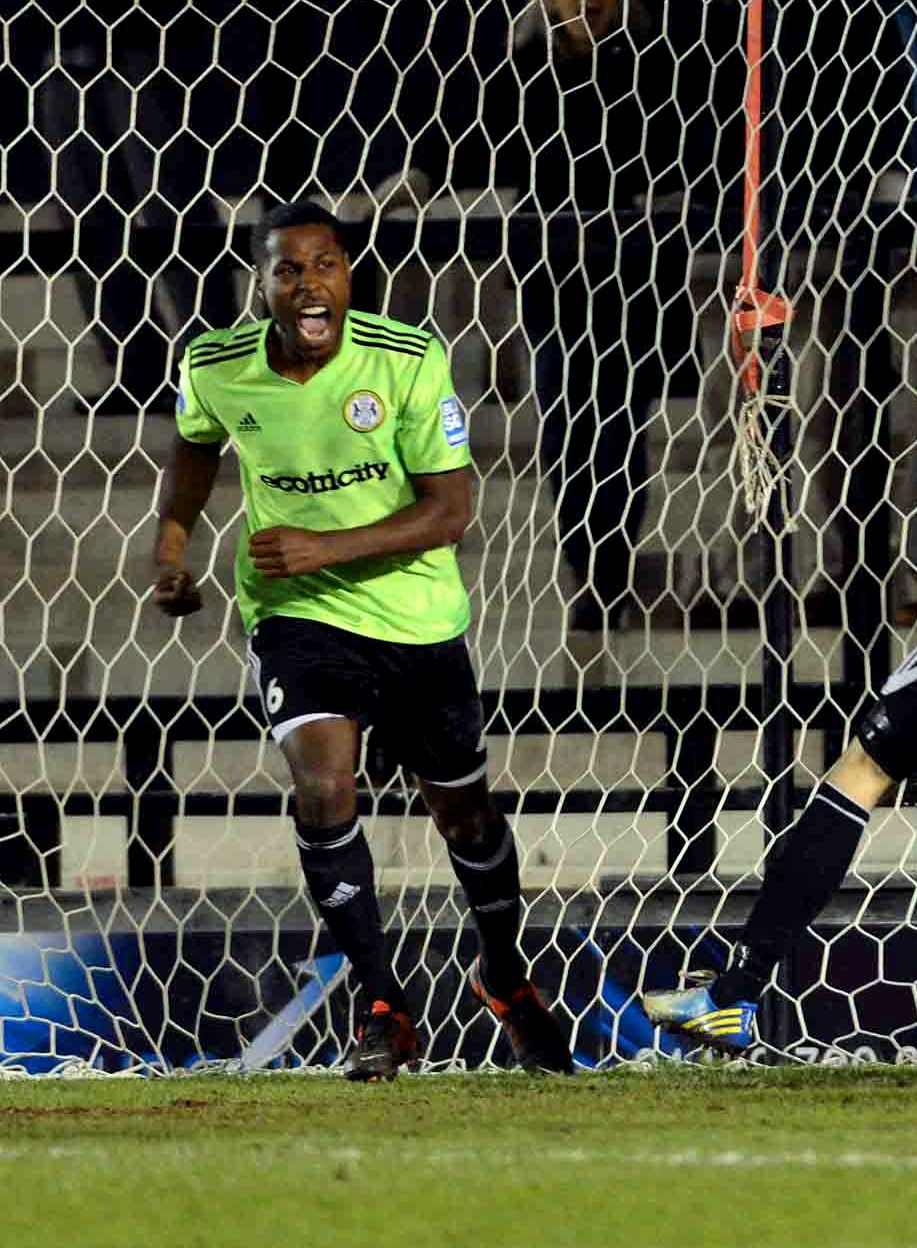
- Bennett playing for Forest Green Rovers in 2013.

Personal information
- Full name: Dale Owen Bennett
- Date of birth: 6 January 1990 (age 36)
- Place of birth: Enfield, England
- Height: 1.81 m (5 ft 11 in)
- Position: Defender

Youth career
- 2004–2008: Watford

Senior career*
Years	Team	Apps	(Gls)
2008–2013	Watford	32	(0)
2008	→ Wealdstone (loan)	10	(0)
2008–2009	→ Kettering Town (loan)	17	(0)
2011	→ Brentford (loan)	1	(1)
2012	→ Brentford (loan)	4	(0)
2012	→ AFC Wimbledon (loan)	5	(0)
2012	→ Yeovil Town (loan)	1	(0)
2013–2018	Forest Green Rovers	180	(5)
2018–2019	Sutton United	49	(0)
- * Club domestic league appearances and goals

Dale Owen Bennett (born 6 January 1990) is an English retired professional footballer, who played as a defender. Dale is now a registered FIFA Football Agent, representing both men and women professional footballers.

== Career ==
If players go to training everyday and show attitude and application in reserve and first team games alike they are going to get picked. That's why Dale Bennett is in the first team.

— Malky Mackay, September 2009

Bennett began his career at English Football League Championship side Watford in the side's academy system. He captained the U-18 side, and signed professionally in March 2008. He made his first-team debut for Watford as a 71st-minute substitute in a 1–0 victory over West Ham United in the League Cup on 23 September 2008.

In November 2008 Bennett joined Conference National side Kettering Town on a month-long loan, which was later extended to the rest of the season. Bennett made his first Football League appearance for Watford in their 1–0 win against Barnsley in September 2009, following an injury to captain Jay DeMerit. Bennett's attitude in training and matches was praised by his manager Malky Mackay, and he retained his place in the team for the following game against Plymouth Argyle, where the team again won 1–0.

Bennett's next run of regular first-team football came in April 2010, when he played in all six games, initially in place of DeMerit, and later Lloyd Doyley. Mackay commented that Bennett was improving as he gained experience. His contract was subsequently extended until the end of the 2010–11 season. At the end of Watford's 2010–11 campaign, the club exercised its option and signed Bennett through the 2012–2013 season. On 27 October 2011, Bennett joined Brentford on a month's loan. He scored his first career goal on his Brentford debut, the winner in a 2–1 win over Chesterfield on 29 October 2011. This proved to be his only appearance for the Bees as injury ruled him out of all other games during his loan spell. Once recovered from his injury, Bennett re-joined Brentford on loan on 1 January 2012 for 28 days. He made four appearances before returning to Watford. Bennett made his first start for Watford in the 2011–12 season away to West Ham United on 7 March 2012. He had to be stretchered off in the second half due to a clash of heads with John Eustace leaving him concussed and not able to continue.

On 31 August 2012, he signed a one-month loan deal with AFC Wimbledon, this was extended for another month on 5 October. AFC Wimbledon manager Neal Ardley announced on 28 October that he would be releasing Bennett on account of injury. On 22 November 2012, Bennett joined League One side Yeovil Town on loan until January 2013. He made his Yeovil Town debut as a substitute in their 3–1 defeat against Carlisle United but this was Bennett's only appearance for the club as he returned to Watford on 8 December due to a back injury.

On 24 January 2013, Bennett joined Forest Green Rovers on a two-and-a-half-year deal, linking up with former teammate, Eddie Oshodi. After overcoming an injury that he arrived with, he made his Forest Green debut on 9 February 2013 in a 1–1 draw at Kenilworth Road against Luton Town. He scored his goal for Forest Green with a dramatic stoppage time equaliser in a 3–3 home draw against Lincoln City on 1 November 2014, Lincoln had led 3–0 with less than half an hour to go. On 5 March 2015, he agreed a new one-year contract with Forest Green that would keep him at the club until the summer of 2016. His second goal for the club came in a 3–1 away win over Barnet on 7 March 2015. His next goal for Forest Green saw him find the net in a 3–1 home win over Macclesfield Town on 11 April 2015.

He was a part of a Forest Green side who reached the Conference National play-offs for the first time at the end of the 2014–15 season, playing in both legs of a semi-final defeat against Bristol Rovers. The following 2015–16 campaign saw him make his hundredth league appearance for Forest Green in a 1–1 away draw at Tranmere Rovers on 19 March 2016. He ended the season playing in the 2015–16 National League play-off final at Wembley Stadium, but ended up on the losing side, suffering a 3–1 defeat against Grimsby Town. The following season he played again in the 2016–17 National League play-off final, helping Forest Green earn promotion to the Football League for the first time in their history with a 3–1 win over Tranmere Rovers.

In June 2018, he returned to the National League, signing a two-year contract with Sutton United. At the end of his first season with the club he won a clean sweep of awards as Club Player of the Year, Players' Player of the Year and Supporters' Player of the Year. On 17 October 2019 the club confirmed, that injuries had forces 29-year old Bennett to retire immediately.

== Personal life ==
Bennett is of Trinidadian, Grenadian and Jamaican descent through his grandparents, and declared interest in representing the Trinidad and Tobago national football team.

Dale has recently turned vegan following his return from his honeymoon in June 2017.

Bennett was also in the process of obtaining the required documentation to represent the Grenadian National Football Team.

Dale is now a registered FIFA Football Agent representing both men and woman professional footballers.

== Career statistics ==
As of match played 22 April 2019

Appearances and goals by club, season and competition
Club	Season	League			FA Cup		League Cup		Other		Total	
Club	Season	Division	Apps	Goals	Apps	Goals	Apps	Goals	Apps	Goals	Apps	Goals
Watford	2008–09	Championship	0	0	—		1	0	—		1	0
Watford	2009–10	Championship	10	0	0	0	0	0	—		10	0
Watford	2010–11	Championship	10	0	1	0	1	0	—		12	0
Watford	2011–12	Championship	2	0	—		0	0	—		2	0
Watford	Total		22	0	1	0	2	0	—		25	0
Kettering Town (loan)	2008–09	Conference Premier	17	0	2	0	—		1 (Note: Appearance in FA Trophy)	0	20	0
Brentford (loan)	2011–12	League One	5	1	0	0	—		0	0	5	1
AFC Wimbledon (loan)	2012–13	League Two	5	0	0	0	—		1 (Note: Appearances in Football League Trophy)	0	6	0
Yeovil Town (loan)	2012–13	League One	1	0	—		—		—		1	0
Forest Green Rovers	2012–13	Conference Premier	8	0	—		—		—		8	0
Forest Green Rovers	2013–14	Conference Premier	32	0	0	0	—		0	0	32	0
Forest Green Rovers	2014–15	Conference Premier	23	3	2	0	—		2 (Note: Appearances in Conference Premier/National League play-offs)	0	27	3
Forest Green Rovers	2015–16	National League	42	0	3	0	—		3	0	48	0
Forest Green Rovers	2016–17	National League	42	2	1	0	—		7 (Note: 4 appearances in FA Trophy, 3 appearances in National League play-offs)	0	50	2
Forest Green Rovers	2017–18	League Two	33	0	0	0	1	0	1	0	35	0
Forest Green Rovers	Total		180	5	6	0	1	0	13	0	200	5
Sutton United	2018–19	National League	41	0	3	0	—		3 (Note: 2 appearances in FA Trophy, 1 appearance in Scottish Challenge Cup)	0	47	0
Sutton United	2019–20	National League	5	0	0	0	—		0	0	5	0
Sutton United	Total		46	0	3	0	—		3	0	52	0
Career totals			276	6	12	0	3	0	18	0	309	6
