= Charles Brampton =

English cricketer

Charles Brampton (5 February 1828 – 12 June 1895) was an English first-class cricketer active 1854–67 who played for Nottinghamshire. He was born in Nottingham; died aged 67 in Marlborough. He also played non-first-class cricket at county level for Herefordshire, Wiltshire, Monmouthshire, Lincolnshire, Devon, and on one occasion in 1856 for Shropshire while club professional at Stourbridge.
