= Shamir Mullings =

English footballer (born 1993)

Personal information
- Full name: Shamir Stephen Mullings
- Date of birth: 30 October 1993 (age 33)
- Place of birth: Enfield, England
- Height: 6 ft 5 in (1.96 m)
- Position: Striker

Team information
- Current team: Lansdowne Yonkers

Youth career
- –2012: Southend United

Senior career*
Years	Team	Apps	(Gls)
2012–2013	Southend United	0	(0)
2012	→ Thurrock (loan)		
2012–2013	→ Witham Town (loan)	9	(1)
2013	→ Tilbury (loan)	7	(1)
2013	→ Harlow Town (loan)		
2013–2014	Bromley	7	(1)
2013	→ Cray Wanderers (loan)	2	(1)
2013–2014	→ Thamesmead Town (loan)		
2014–2016	Havant & Waterlooville	59	(4)
2015	→ Staines Town (loan)	1	(0)
2016	Chelmsford City	18	(12)
2016–2018	Forest Green Rovers	19	(1)
2017	→ Hampton & Richmond Borough (loan)	6	(1)
2017	→ Macclesfield Town (loan)	0	(0)
2018–2019	Maidstone United	12	(2)
2018–2019	→ Dagenham & Redbridge (loan)	7	(1)
2019	Macclesfield Town	0	(0)
2019–2020	Aldershot Town	23	(1)
2019–2020	→ Dulwich Hamlet (loan)	13	(4)
2020	Dulwich Hamlet	0	(0)
2020	Weymouth	5	(0)
2021–	Lansdowne Yonkers		
- * Club domestic league appearances and goals as of 21:44, 16 December 2020 (UTC)

Shamir Stephen Mullings (born 30 October 1993) is an English professional footballer who plays as a striker for Lansdowne Yonkers. Mullings is also Lansdowne's club director.

== Career ==
Mullings has played for Southend United, Thurrock (loan), Witham Town (loan), Tilbury (loan), Harlow Town (loan), Bromley, Cray Wanderers (loan), Thamesmead Town (loan), Havant & Waterlooville, Staines Town (loan), Chelmsford City, Forest Green Rovers and Hampton & Richmond Borough (loan). He moved from Chelmsford City to Forest Green Rovers in November 2016. In February 2017 he joined National League South side Hampton & Richmond Borough on an initial one-month loan. Mullings scored once in six league games before returning to Forest Green for their promotion run-in. In November 2017 he signed for National League side Macclesfield Town on an initial two-month loan deal in a bid to play regular football. His loan was cancelled a week later having not made an appearance for the Silkmen after they discovered a previously undetected injury.

Following his release from Forest Green he joined League Two Swindon Town on trial, scoring against Cirencester Town in a pre-season friendly. The trial proved unsuccessful and on 10 July 2018 he signed for National League side Maidstone United on a one-year deal. He started the season as a first team regular scoring twice in the first twelve games, against Leyton Orient and Barrow. On 28 September 2018, he signed for National League side Dagenham & Redbridge on a season-long loan. He scored on his debut for the club which was a consolation goal in the 3–1 home defeat to Ebbsfleet United a day later. After being released by Maidstone in January 2019, he returned to Macclesfield Town on a permanent deal later that month, signing a contract until the end of the 2018–19 season. He was released at the end of the season. He was one of a number of Macclesfield players who petitioned for the club's winding-up due to unpaid wages.

In August 2019 he moved to Aldershot Town. In December 2019 he moved on loan to Dulwich Hamlet. On 9 March 2020 he joined Dulwich permanently. In September 2020 he went on trial with Hungarian top flight team Diósgyőri VTK. He scored in a friendly but was not offered a contract.

Mullings signed for Weymouth on 10 October 2020. He left the club on 16 December 2020.

Mullings joined Lansdowne Yonkers in 2021.

== Career statistics ==
As of match played 12 December 2020

Appearances and goals by club, season and competition
Club	Season	League			FA Cup		League Cup		Other		Total	
Club	Season	Division	Apps	Goals	Apps	Goals	Apps	Goals	Apps	Goals	Apps	Goals
Bromley	2013–14	Conference South	7	1	1	1	—		—		8	2
Havant & Waterlooville	2014–15	Conference South	31	3	5	0	—		5 (Note: Three appearances in FA Trophy, two in Conference South play-offs)	0	41	3
Havant & Waterlooville	2015–16	National League South	28	1	5	0	—		4 (Note: Appearances in FA Trophy)	1	37	2
Havant & Waterlooville	Total		59	4	10	0	—		9	1	78	5
Chelmsford City	2016–17	National League South	18	12	1	2	—		1	0	20	14
Forest Green Rovers	2016–17	National League	12	0	—		—		3 (Note: Appearances in National League play-offs)	0	15	0
Forest Green Rovers	2017–18	League Two	7	1	0	0	1	0	1 (Note: Appearances in EFL Trophy)	0	9	1
Forest Green Rovers	Total		19	1	0	0	1	0	4	0	24	1
Hampton & Richmond Borough (loan)	2016–17	National League South	6	1	—		—		—		6	1
Macclesfield Town (loan)	2017–18	National League	0	0	—		—		—		0	0
Maidstone United	2018–19	National League	12	2	—		—		—		12	2
Dagenham & Redbridge (loan)	2018–19	National League	7	1	2	0	—		1	0	10	1
Macclesfield Town	2018–19	League Two	0	0	—		—		—		0	0
Aldershot Town	2019–20	National League	23	1	1	1	—		1	0	25	2
Dulwich Hamlet (loan)	2019–20	National League South	13	4	—		—		—		13	4
Weymouth	2020–21	National League	5	0	0	0	—		0	0	5	0
Career total			169	27	15	4	1	0	16	1	201	32

== Honours ==
Forest Green Rovers

- National League play-offs: 2017
