= Brampton Gurdon =

Brampton Gurdon may refer to:

- Brampton Gurdon (of Assington and Letton) (died 1649), Member of Parliament for Sudbury (1621) and High Sheriff of Suffolk
- Brampton Gurdon (of Letton) (1606–1669), his son, Member of Parliament for Sudbury (1645–1653) and a cavalry colonel in the English Civil War
- Brampton Gurdon (lecturer) (died 1741), Archdeacon of Sudbury, fellow of Caius College, Cambridge and Boyle lecturer
- Brampton Gurdon (Norfolk MP) (1797–1881), British politician
- William Brampton Gurdon (1840–1910), Norfolk MP sometimes called Sir Brampton Gurdon
