= Charlie Cooper (footballer) =

English footballer (born 1997)

Personal information
- Full name: Charlie Terrence Cooper
- Date of birth: 1 May 1997 (age 29)
- Place of birth: Stockton-on-Tees, England
- Height: 5 ft 9 in (1.75 m)
- Position: Central midfielder

Team information
- Current team: Brackley Town

Youth career
- 2007–2015: Birmingham City

Senior career*
Years	Team	Apps	(Gls)
2015–2017	Birmingham City	0	(0)
2016	→ Forest Green Rovers (loan)	0	(0)
2016	→ York City (loan)	5	(0)
2016–2017	→ Forest Green Rovers (loan)	21	(0)
2017–2019	Forest Green Rovers	25	(1)
2018	→ Newport County (loan)	9	(0)
2019	→ Boreham Wood (loan)	5	(0)
2019–2020	FC Halifax Town	27	(1)
2020–2021	Woking	38	(3)
2021–2022	Wealdstone	36	(2)
2022–2023	Oldham Athletic	15	(0)
2023–2026	Yeovil Town	97	(2)
2025	→ Hereford (loan)	5	(0)
2025–2026	→ Kidderminster Harriers (loan)	26	(5)
2026–	Brackley Town	0	(0)
- * Club domestic league appearances and goals as of 15:12, 9 May 2026 (UTC)

Charlie Terrence Cooper (born 1 May 1997) is an English professional footballer who plays as a central midfielder for National League North club Brackley Town.

Cooper began his career with Birmingham City, but never played for their first team. He spent time on loan at National League clubs York City and Forest Green Rovers before joining the latter on a permanent basis in 2017 after their promotion to the Football League. In 2018–19, he spent time on loan at League Two club Newport County and Boreham Wood of the National League. Cooper subsequently spent seasons with National League clubs FC Halifax Town, scoring once from 31 appearances, Woking and Wealdstone, before joining Oldham Athletic in 2022.

== Life and career ==
=== Early life and career ===
Cooper is the son of former footballer Mark Cooper and grandson of England international Terry Cooper. He was born in Stockton-on-Tees, County Durham, while his father was a Hartlepool United player. The family later moved to the Midlands, where Cooper attended Alderbrook School in Solihull. He was noticed by representatives of Birmingham City when playing in a cup final, and joined their Academy in 2007. He took up a scholarship with the club in July 2013. Interviewed in early 2014, he assessed his strength as passing, and felt he needed to improve his heading.

Cooper signed his first professional contract, of two years, in May 2015. According to coach Steve Spooner, "Charlie is like the conductor of the orchestra; he sets the tone. He's learnt how to slow games down and speed games up. His range of passing has improved, as well as his goal scoring. And I think there is more to come from him in that area."

=== National League football ===
Cooper joined National League club Forest Green Rovers on a month's youth loan on 23 January 2016. He was an unused substitute for four matches before Birmingham recalled him. He was a member of the Birmingham reserve team that lost the 2016 Birmingham Senior Cup final to National League North champions Solihull Moors.

On 26 October of the following season, he was loaned to another National League club, this time York City. He went straight into the starting eleven for the next match, at home to Sutton United. According to Dave Flett of the York Press, Cooper "introduced some much-needed forward thrust" to the midfield as the match ended 2–2. He started four more matches, all in the league, before returning to Birmingham after one month.

On 9 December, Cooper rejoined Forest Green Rovers – who were by that time under his father's management – for another month. After he made five appearances during the month, Birmingham allowed the loan to be extended to the end of the season. He was a regular starter throughout his loan spell, and helped the club gain promotion to the Football League for the first time in the club's history.

=== League football with Forest Green Rovers ===
Birmingham had confirmed in March that Cooper would be released when his contract expired at the end of the season, and he signed a two-year contract with Forest Green on 15 June 2017. He made his Football League debut on the opening day of the 2017–18 season, in the starting eleven for the League Two visit of Barnet to The New Lawn. He took the corner kick from which Christian Doidge headed Forest Green's first Football League goal, and played the whole of the match, which finished 2–2. Cooper scored his first senior goal on 19 August, contributing Forest Green's third goal with a "speculative strike" as his team came back from 2–0 and 3–1 down to beat Yeovil Town 4–3 and record their first win in the Football League. He established himself as a regular in the midfield, until knee damage, diagnosed as hyperextension of his left knee and bruising to the bone, sustained following a tackle in a match against Coventry City in mid-October, kept him out for six weeks. He returned to the side as a second-half substitute in an EFL Trophy match on 5 December, and then resumed his place in the starting eleven.

Cooper joined Forest Green's League Two rivals Newport County on 22 June 2018 on loan for the 2018–19 season. He made his Newport debut on the opening day of the season, as a second-half substitute in a 3–0 defeat at Mansfield Town. He made 15 appearances in all competitions without scoring before his loan was ended early on 13 December. In mid-March 2019, he went out on loan to National League club Boreham Wood, finishing the season with five appearances.

=== Return to the National League ===
Forest Green took up their option to retain Cooper's services for the 2019–20 season, but cancelled his contract by mutual consent in August. He had trained with Bury, but a potential contract fell through after the club was expelled from the EFL. On 12 September 2019, Cooper signed for National League club FC Halifax Town.

On 5 September 2020, Cooper agreed to make the switch to fellow National League side, Woking, on a one-year deal. Cooper made a total of 46 appearances, netting 4 times for the Cards before departing the club at the end of the season.

On 11 August 2021, it was announced that Cooper had signed a one-year contract with another National League club, Wealdstone. His debut came a week later, in a 2–1 defeat to his former club, Woking. His first goal for Wealdstone, scored from the edge of the penalty area, proved to be the decider away to King's Lynn Town on 25 September. Cooper scored once more for the club, as a substitute in a 4–2 defeat away to Altrincham, and made 38 appearances in all competitions before leaving at the end of thee season after talks to extend his contract came to nothing.

After a trial, Cooper signed for Oldham Athletic ahead of the 2022–23 season. He left the club in December 2022 when his six-month contract expired.

On 14 January 2023, Cooper signed by his father Mark for fellow National League side Yeovil Town on an 18-month contract.

In October 2025, Cooper joined National League North club Hereford on loan until 5 January 2026. On 28 November 2025, Cooper was recalled by Yeovil Town. The following day, Cooper joined National League North side Kidderminster Harriers on loan until the end of January 2026. He was released by Yeovil Town at the end of the 2025–26 season.

On 4 June 2026, Brackley Town announced Cooper as their first summer signing ahead of their return to the National League North.

== Career statistics ==
As of end of 2025–26 season

Appearances and goals by club, season and competition
Club	Season	League			FA Cup		EFL Cup		Other		Total	
Club	Season	Division	Apps	Goals	Apps	Goals	Apps	Goals	Apps	Goals	Apps	Goals
Birmingham City	2015–16	Championship	0	0	0	0	0	0	—		0	0
Birmingham City	2016–17	Championship	0	0	—		0	0	—		0	0
Birmingham City	Total		0	0	0	0	0	0	—		0	0
Forest Green Rovers (loan)	2015–16	National League	0	0	—		—		—		0	0
York City (loan)	2016–17	National League	5	0	—		—		—		5	0
Forest Green Rovers (loan)	2016–17	National League	21	0	—		—		7 (Note: Four appearances in FA Trophy, three in National League play-offs)	0	28	0
Forest Green Rovers	2017–18	League Two	25	1	1	0	1	0	4 (Note: Appearances in EFL Trophy)	0	31	1
Forest Green Rovers	2018–19	League Two	0	0	—		—		—		0	0
Forest Green Rovers	Total		46	1	1	0	1	0	11	0	59	1
Newport County (loan)	2018–19	League Two	9	0	0	0	2	0	4	0	15	0
Boreham Wood (loan)	2018–19	National League	5	0	—		—		—		5	0
FC Halifax Town	2019–20	National League	27	1	1	0	—		3 (Note: Two appearances in FA Trophy, one in National League play-offs)	0	31	1
Woking	2020–21	National League	38	3	2	0	—		5 (Note: Appearances in FA Trophy)	1	45	4
Wealdstone	2021–22	National League	36	2	1	0	—		1	0	38	2
Oldham Athletic	2022–23	National League	15	0	3	0	—		0	0	18	0
Yeovil Town	2022–23	National League	21	0	—		—		0	0	21	0
Yeovil Town	2023–24	National League South	32	0	3	0	—		0	0	35	0
Yeovil Town	2024–25	National League	41	2	1	0	—		1	0	43	2
Yeovil Town	2025–26	National League	3	0	0	0	—		0	0	3	0
Yeovil Town	Total		97	2	4	0	—		1	0	102	2
Hereford (loan)	2025–26	National League North	5	0	—		—		0	0	5	0
Kidderminster Harriers (loan)	2025–26	National League North	26	5	—		—		2 (Note: Appearances in National League North play-offs)	1	28	6
Career total			309	14	12	0	3	0	27	2	350	16

== Honours ==
Forest Green Rovers

- National League play-offs: 2017

Yeovil Town

- National League South: 2023–24

Kidderminster Harriers

- National League North play-offs: 2026
