= Dan Wishart =

English footballer (born 1992)

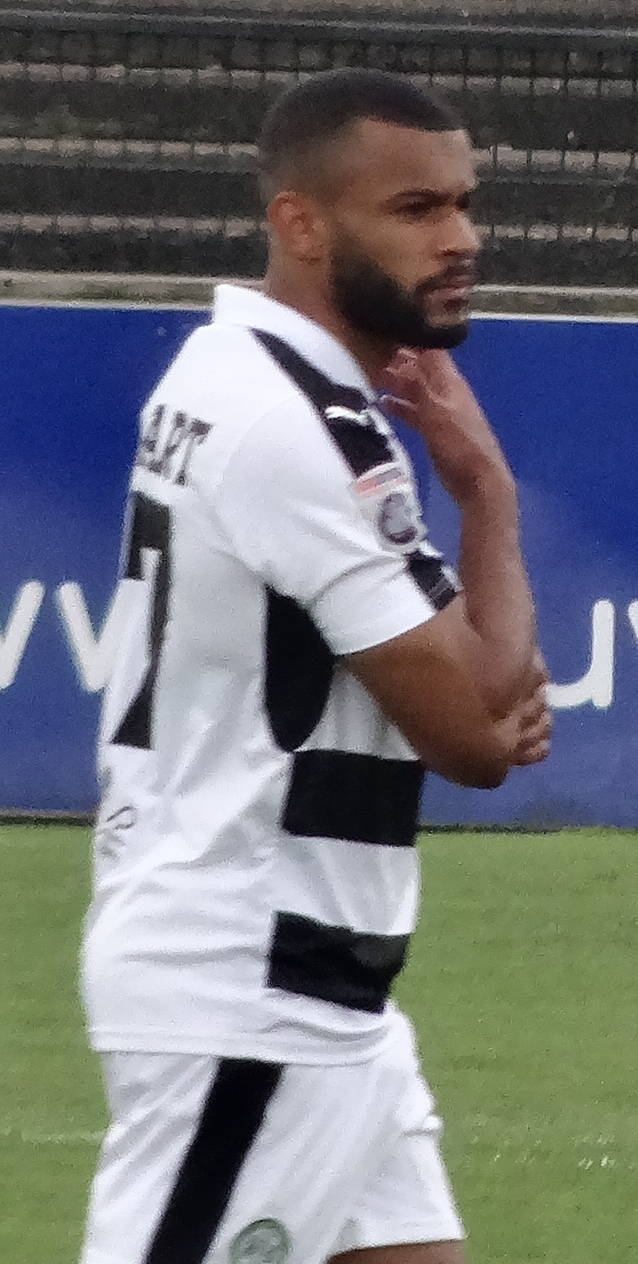
- Wishart playing for Forest Green Rovers in 2017

Personal information
- Full name: Daniel Alexander Wishart
- Date of birth: 28 May 1992 (age 34)
- Place of birth: Hillingdon, England
- Height: 5 ft 7 in (1.70 m)
- Position: Defender

Team information
- Current team: Sholing

Youth career
- –2010: Hayes & Yeading United

Senior career*
Years	Team	Apps	(Gls)
2010–2013	Hayes & Yeading United	97	(9)
2010	→ Hendon (loan)	5	(3)
2011	→ Burnham (loan)	1	(0)
2013–2014	Alfreton Town	19	(2)
2014	→ Hayes & Yeading United (loan)	2	(0)
2014	→ Margate (loan)	7	(0)
2014	→ Eastleigh (loan)	10	(0)
2014	Hayes & Yeading United	13	(4)
2014–2016	Sutton United	68	(6)
2016–2018	Forest Green Rovers	61	(0)
2018	Sutton United	14	(0)
2018–2020	Maidstone United	48	(7)
2020–2022	Wealdstone	20	(0)
2021–2022	→ Hemel Hempstead Town (loan)	23	(1)
2022	Hayes & Yeading United	12	(1)
2022–2024	Hampton & Richmond Borough	58	(0)
2024–2025	Hemel Hempstead Town	20	(0)
2025	Sholing	1	(0)
2025–	Sholing	9	(0)

International career
2016	England C	2	(0)
- * Club domestic league appearances and goals as of 17:49, 6 October 2025 (UTC)

Daniel Alexander Wishart (born 28 May 1992) is an English professional footballer who plays as a defender for Sholing.

== Club career ==
Wishart started his footballing career at local side Hayes & Yeading United, where he played over 100 times, before joining Alfreton Town in 2013. Failing to establish himself as a key player at Alfreton, Wishart had loan spells at Margate and Eastleigh before returning to Hayes & Yeading United for the 2014–15 season. After impressing within his first few games of the campaign, Wishart moved to fellow Conference South side Sutton United. On 15 November 2014, Wishart made his Sutton debut during their 2–1 home defeat against Hemel Hempstead Town, featuring for 63 minutes before being replaced by Jessy Reindorf. A couple of months later, Wishart scored his first goal for Sutton during their 1–1 draw with Wealdstone, with the opening goal in the 42nd minute. Wishart quickly became a regular in the Sutton starting lineup, having an influential role in their promotion to the National League during the 2015–16 season.

Following an impressive start to the 2016–17 season, Wishart joined Forest Green Rovers in October 2016. Wishart made his Forest Green debut in their 4–0 away victory over Aldershot Town, featuring for the entire 90 minutes. He scored his first goal for Forest Green in an EFL Trophy tie against Newport County on 29 August 2017.

On 18 June 2018, Wishart returned to Sutton United on a two-year contract for an undisclosed fee, before signing for Maidstone United in November 2018. Following Maidstone's relegation, Wishart was transfer listed by the club after citing a desire to play at a higher level. However, he was swiftly reintroduced to the team in 2019-20, scoring 8 times in total before the season was curtailed due to the COVID-19 pandemic.

On 3 July 2020, Wishart returned to the National League by signing for Wealdstone. Wishart made his first appearance for the club on 27 October 2020, coming off the bench against King's Lynn in a 3–2 victory for the Stones, with his first start coming on 9 January 2021 against Hartlepool United. At the end of the season, it was announced that Wishart would be departing the club. However, he continued to train with the club, and was later included in the squad for the 2021–22 season. On 20 October 2021, Wishart signed for Hemel Hempstead Town on loan. He played a total of 24 games for Hemel, scoring once. On 17 May 2022, it was announced that Wishart had been released by Wealdstone. Wishart returned for a third permanent spell at Hayes & Yeading United in the summer of 2022 before departing for Hampton & Richmond Borough in November 2022.

In May 2024, Wishart joined Hemel Hempstead Town on a permanent basis. He left the club in January 2025, signing for Sholing where he made one appearance before suffering an injury. Wishart rejoined Sholing ahead of the 2025–26 season.

== Career statistics ==
As of match played 7 April 2019

Appearances and goals by club, season and competition
Club	Season	League			FA Cup		EFL Cup		Other		Total	
Club	Season	Division	Apps	Goals	Apps	Goals	Apps	Goals	Apps	Goals	Apps	Goals
Hayes & Yeading United	2009–10	Conference Premier	11	0	0	0	—		0	0	11	0
Hayes & Yeading United	2010–11	Conference Premier	13	0	0	0	—		0	0	13	0
Hayes & Yeading United	2011–12	Conference Premier	36	5	1	0	—		1 (Note: Appearance(s) in FA Trophy)	0	38	5
Hayes & Yeading United	2012–13	Conference South	37	4	3	1	—		2	1	42	6
Hayes & Yeading United	Total		97	9	4	1	—		3	1	104	11
Hendon (loan)	2010–11	Isthmian League Premier Division	5	3	3	0	—		3 (Note: One appearance in Alan Turvey Trophy, two in FA Trophy)	0	11	3
Burnham (loan)	2011–12	Southern League Division One Central	1	0	0	0	—		1 (Note: Appearance in Alan Turvey Trophy)	0	2	0
Alfreton Town	2013–14	Conference Premier	19	2	0	0	—		1	0	20	2
Hayes & Yeading United (loan)	2013–14	Conference South	2	0	0	0	—		0	0	2	0
Margate (loan)	2013–14	Isthmian League Premier Division	7	0	0	0	—		0	0	7	0
Eastleigh (loan)	2013–14	Conference South	10	0	0	0	—		0	0	10	0
Hayes & Yeading United	2014–15	Conference South	13	4	0	0	—		0	0	13	4
Sutton United	2014–15	Conference South	22	2	0	0	—		2	0	24	2
Sutton United	2015–16	National League South	37	3	4	1	—		6	0	47	4
Sutton United	2016–17	National League	9	1	0	0	—		0	0	9	1
Sutton United	Total		68	6	4	1	—		8	0	80	7
Forest Green Rovers	2016–17	National League	29	0	0	0	—		7 (Note: Four appearances in FA Trophy, three in National League play-offs)	0	36	0
Forest Green Rovers	2017–18	League Two	32	0	2	0	1	0	4 (Note: Appearances in the EFL Trophy)	1	39	1
Forest Green Rovers	Total		61	0	2	0	1	0	11	1	75	1
Sutton United	2018–19	National League	14	0	0	0	—		3 (Note: One appearance in FA Trophy, two in Scottish Challenge Cup)	0	17	0
Maidstone United	2018–19	National League	19	0	0	0	—		6	0	25	0
Maidstone United	2019–20	National League South	29	7	3	1	—		1	0	33	8
Maidstone United	Total		48	7	3	1	0	0	7	0	58	8
Wealdstone	2020–21	National League	15	0	0	0	—		1	0	16	0
Wealdstone	2021–22	National League	5	0	0	0	—		0	0	5	0
Wealdstone	Total		20	0	0	0	1	0	0	0	21	0
Hemel Hempstead Town (loan)	2021–22	National League South	23	1	0	0	—		1	0	24	1
Career total			388	32	16	3	1	0	39	2	446	37

== Honours ==
Sutton United

- National League South: 2015–16

Forest Green Rovers

- National League play-offs: 2017
