= Mark Cooper (footballer, born 1968) =

English association football manager, former player

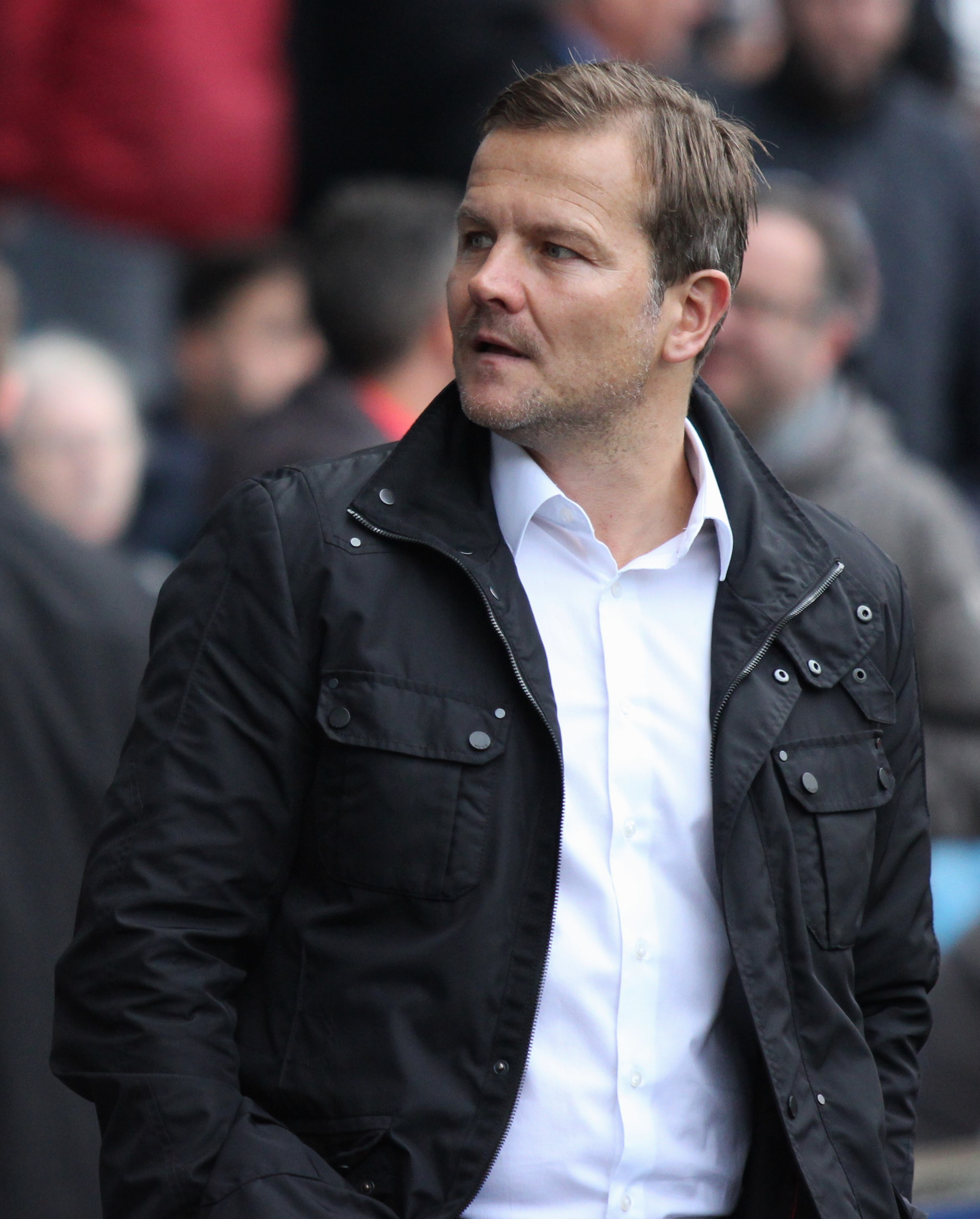
- Cooper pictured in January 2011

Personal information
- Full name: Mark Nicholas Cooper
- Date of birth: 18 December 1968 (age 57)
- Place of birth: Wakefield, England
- Height: 5 ft 8 in (1.73 m)
- Position: Midfielder

Team information
- Current team: Chelmsford City (manager)

Youth career
- –1987: Bristol City

Senior career*
Years	Team	Apps	(Gls)
1987–1989	Bristol City	0	(0)
1989–1991	Exeter City	50	(12)
1990	→ Southend United (loan)	5	(0)
1991–1992	Birmingham City	39	(4)
1992–1994	Fulham	14	(0)
1993	→ Huddersfield Town (loan)	10	(4)
1994	Wycombe Wanderers	2	(1)
1994–1996	Exeter City	88	(20)
1996–1997	Hartlepool United	31	(9)
1997	→ Macclesfield Town (loan)	8	(2)
1997–1998	Leyton Orient	1	(0)
1998–2000	Rushden & Diamonds	17	(8)
2000	→ Telford United (loan)	5	(1)
2000–2001	Hednesford Town	24	(4)
2001–2002	Forest Green Rovers	48	(18)
2002–2007	Tamworth	104	(31)
2007	Hinckley United	15	(1)
2007–2009	Kettering Town	1	(1)
Total		457	(115)

Managerial career
- 2004–2007: Tamworth
- 2007–2009: Kettering Town
- 2009–2010: Peterborough United
- 2010–2011: Darlington
- 2012: Kettering Town
- 2013: AFC Telford United
- 2013–2015: Swindon Town
- 2016: Notts County
- 2016–2021: Forest Green Rovers
- 2021–2022: Barrow
- 2022–2025: Yeovil Town
- 2026–: Chelmsford City
- * Club domestic league appearances and goals

Mark Nicholas Cooper (born 18 December 1968) is an English former association football player and manager who played as a midfielder. Cooper is currently manager of Chelmsford City.

Cooper followed his father Terry into the sport, starting his career with Bristol City in 1987. During a 22-year playing career he was at 17 clubs, including three on loan and two spells at Exeter City. He played 457 league games, during which he scored 115 goals, with his five-year spell at non-League Tamworth being his longest at any club. At two of his final three clubs, he also combined the role with being manager. He then went into management full-time, with clubs both outside and within the Football League.

== Playing career ==
Born in Wakefield, West Riding of Yorkshire, Cooper's football career started in 1987, where he first appeared on the books of Bristol City as a trainee, but never made any first team appearances for the club. After two seasons with the Robins, Cooper moved on to Exeter City, managed by his father, in October 1989. He played 50 games and scored 12 goals for the south-western club, and during his time with The Grecians, Mark went on loan to Southend United, where he only made 5 appearances.

In September 1991, Cooper joined Birmingham City. He played a total of 39 games, and scored 4 goals for the Midlands club. Cooper next signed for London club Fulham for a £40,000 fee. After only 14 games for the club, and a brief loan spell with Huddersfield Town in 1993, he moved on to Wycombe Wanderers, before returning for a second spell with Exeter City in February 1994.

Two seasons later Cooper went north to Hartlepool United, where he made 31 appearances and scored 9 goals. His third and final loan spell was with Macclesfield Town in September 1997, where he spent two months and made just 8 appearances, scoring twice. In December 1997, Cooper joined Leyton Orient on a non-contract basis, before moving on to Rushden & Diamonds.

After two years with the club, Cooper moved on to Hednesford Town. Cooper then moved on to Forest Green Rovers, where he was club captain and named Supporters' Player of the Year. This was his final team before joining Tamworth as a player in May 2002.

== Managerial career ==
At the start of the 2003–04 season Cooper was appointed player/assistant manager at Tamworth and moved up to manager following the departure of Darron Gee for the 2004–05 season.

During his time as Tamworth manager, Cooper managed to get them into the third round of the FA Cup in two consecutive seasons. The first time they played against Stoke City at the Britannia Stadium and they managed to force a replay at their own ground, where the game was decided on penalties. The following season they played against Norwich City and lost 4–1.

Tamworth's league form did not match their cup exploits, however. In the 2005–06 season Tamworth finished second-bottom of the Conference, and only survived when Canvey Island resigned from the league. The following season went little better, and on 24 January 2007, he left Tamworth by mutual consent, with the club bottom of the Conference table.

On 16 May 2007, Cooper was appointed manager of Kettering Town. He had a successful first season with the Poppies, winning the Conference North title with a margin of 17 points. In the 2008–09 season, he guided Kettering to the FA Cup fourth round, a joint record for the furthest the club have been in the competition, where they faced Premier League team Fulham. He also guided the Poppies to eight place in the Conference National, completing a successful return to that division.

After days of speculation, on 13 November 2009, Cooper agreed in principle to a three-and-a-half-year contract to become Darren Ferguson's successor as manager of Championship side Peterborough United. He was appointed as manager the following day. He left Kettering second in the table and on a twelve-game unbeaten run. The Poppies were also in the Second Round of the FA Cup, and had been handed a dream tie against Leeds United. Cooper managed his last game as a Poppy away at Cambridge United where his side won 2–0, Cooper was applauded off the pitch by the Kettering Town faithful and had tears running down his cheeks.

On 25 November, he made his first signing as Peterborough manager, signing Exodus Geohaghon from former club Kettering Town. On 19 December, Peterborough won their first game with Cooper in charge, a 2–1 home win against Watford. Later that month, they recovered from a 0–4 home deficit to Cardiff City to claim a 4–4 draw. Cooper was sacked just 13 games into his tenure on 1 February 2010 with only one win in those 13 games.

Cooper was named Darlington manager on 29 June 2010, where he signed a two-year contract. Chairman Raj Singh turned down official approaches from Lincoln City and York City for Cooper in October. Cooper's first season with Darlington in 2010–11 was deemed a success. After a rocky start to the season the team recovered, going on a run of only one defeat in 20 league and cup matches from January 2011, eventually finishing in a creditable league position of 7th. Darlington under Cooper's guidance also reached the second round of the FA Cup, and beat Mansfield Town 1–0 at Wembley to win the 2011 FA Trophy Final. Following what the chairman described as "recent results ... closer to relegation form than promotion form", Cooper was dismissed as Darlington manager on 24 October 2011.

On 4 January 2012, Cooper was appointed caretaker manager of Kettering Town, but withdrew from the role after only one match citing the club's off-field issues.

Cooper was appointed manager at AFC Telford United on 31 January 2013 after Andy Sinton was sacked. After just five games in charge – one draw and four defeats – he was appointed assistant to new Swindon Town manager Kevin MacDonald.

On 20 August 2013, he was appointed manager of Swindon Town, after taking over as assistant manager from when MacDonald resigned on 13 July 2013. He led the club to 8th in his first season in charge during the 2013–14 Football League One campaign, and followed that up by qualifying for the 2014–15 League One play-offs the following season. After play-off semi-final success over Sheffield United, he led the club out in the 2015 League One play-off final at Wembley Stadium but was denied promotion, losing 4–0 to Preston North End. Later after play-off final defeat, he sold midfield duo Ben Gladwin and Massimo Luongo to Queens Park Rangers for undisclosed seven-figure transfer fees.

On 17 October 2015, following a 2–0 defeat to Millwall, it was announced that he had parted company with Swindon Town.

Cooper was appointed manager of League Two Notts County on 20 March 2016 on a short-term contract until the end of the season. He was set a points target which, if met, would bring a permanent deal. He met the target but chose to leave the club.

=== Forest Green Rovers ===
After leaving Notts County, Cooper became manager of National League club Forest Green Rovers; when he joined, on 9 May, they had just reached the 2016 National League play-off final, although caretaker manager Scott Bartlett took charge for the final at Wembley with Cooper in an advisory role. Despite losing that final to Grimsby Town, Cooper led Forest Green to promotion to the Football League for the first time in the following season, beating Tranmere Rovers in the 2017 play-off final.

On 23 November 2019 Cooper was accused of provoking Leyton Orient interim head coach Ross Embleton with a comment about the death of Justin Edinburgh. Cooper denied the allegations, and the Football Association decided not to investigate the matter further.

On 11 April 2021, Forest Green Rovers parted company with Cooper after five years at the club during which he oversaw a historic promotion to the Football League.

=== Barrow ===
On 28 May 2021, Cooper was appointed as manager of Barrow after weeks of speculation, signing a three-year deal with the club.

On 17 February 2022, Cooper was given an eight-game touchline ban for comments he allegedly made to a female assistant referee which included a reference to gender.

On 20 March 2022, Cooper left his role as manager by mutual consent the day after a 2–1 Cumbrian Derby defeat to Carlisle United that left his side in 21st position.

=== Yeovil Town ===
On 28 October 2022, Cooper was appointed manager of National League side Yeovil Town, signing a two-and-a-half-year deal. Under Cooper, Yeovil were relegated from the National League to the National League South on 18 April 2023.

An impressive start to the 2023–24 season saw Cooper awarded the Manager of the Month award for October 2023 having overseen five wins from five. His winning streak led to a club record of 14 consecutive wins in November, with Yeovil top of the league. On 11 April 2024, a 2–0 victory over Truro City saw Yeovil's promotion as champions secured.

On 26 August 2025, Cooper was relieved of his duties after a start to the season which saw Yeovil pick up just four points in the first five games.

=== Chelmsford City ===
On 20 April 2026, Cooper was appointed manager of Chelmsford City.

== Personal life ==
He is the son of former Leeds United and England full-back Terry Cooper. Mark's son, Charlie, also became a footballer.

== Managerial statistics ==
As of match played 14 November 2026

Managerial record by team and tenure
Team	From	To	Record				
Team	From	To	P	W	D	L	Win %
Tamworth	28 April 2004	24 January 2007	138	41	35	62	29.7
Kettering Town	16 May 2007	14 November 2009	128	73	30	25	57.0
Peterborough United	14 November 2009	1 February 2010	13	1	4	8	7.7
Darlington	29 June 2010	24 October 2011	86	36	26	24	41.9
Kettering Town	4 January 2012	18 January 2012	1	0	0	1	0.0
AFC Telford United	31 January 2013	1 March 2013	5	0	1	4	0.0
Swindon Town	13 July 2013	17 October 2015	125	52	27	46	41.6
Notts County	20 March 2016	7 May 2016	10	3	2	5	30.0
Forest Green Rovers	9 May 2016	11 April 2021	255	101	67	87	39.6
Barrow	28 May 2021	20 March 2022	46	12	15	19	26.1
Yeovil Town	28 October 2022	26 August 2025	141	55	34	52	39.0
Chelmsford City	11 May 2026	Present	20	7	11	2	35.0
Total			960	374	251	335	39.0

== Honours ==
=== Manager ===
Kettering Town

- Conference North: 2007–08

Darlington

- FA Trophy: 2010–11

Forest Green Rovers

- National League play-offs: 2017

Yeovil Town

- National League South: 2023–24

Individual

- League One Manager of the Month: November 2014
- National League South Manager of the Month: October 2023
- National League South Manager of the Season: 2023–24
