= 2017–18 Stevenage F.C. season =

Stevenage
2017–18 season
- Chairman: Phil Wallace
- Manager: Darren Sarll (until 18 March 2018); Dino Maamria (from 20 March 2018)
- League Two: 16th
- FA Cup: Third round
- EFL Cup: First round
- EFL Trophy: Group Stage
- Top goalscorer: League: Danny Newton (14); All: Danny Newton (16)
Home colours	Away colours

The 2017–18 season was Stevenage's fourth consecutive season in League Two and their 42nd year in existence. Along with competing in League Two, the club also participated in the FA Cup, EFL Cup and EFL Trophy.

The season covers the period from 1 July 2017 to 30 June 2018.

== Competitions ==
=== Friendlies ===
On 19 May 2017, Stevenage announced their first two friendlies for pre-season. Four days later, a third home pre-season match, against Millwall was confirmed. Six further pre-season fixtures were revealed two days later.

On 20 July 2017, it was announced the planned friendly against Cheshunt had been cancelled.

8 July 2017	Hitchin Town	1–1	Stevenage	Hitchin
15:00 BST	Charles 65'	Report	Turgott	Stadium: Top Field; Attendance: 732

11 July 2017	Stevenage	2–2	Norwich City	Stevenage
19:45 BST	Samuel 32'; Gorman 66' (pen.)	Report	Oliveira 7'; Pritchard 24'	Stadium: Lamex Stadium

22 July 2017	Stevenage	1–2	Charlton Athletic	Stevenage
15:00 BST	Franks 34'	Report	Ahearne-Grant 40'; Forster-Caskey 56'	Stadium: Lamex Stadium

25 July 2017	Stevenage	0–0	Millwall	Stevenage
19:45 BST		Report		Stadium: Lamex Stadium

29 July 2017	Dagenham & Redbridge	0–2	Stevenage	Dagenham
15:00 BST		Report	Wilkinson 13'; McKee 20'	Stadium: Chigwell Construction Stadium

=== League Two ===
==== League table ====
Pos	Team	Pld	W	D	L	GF	GA	GD	Pts
14	Crawley Town	46	16	11	19	58	66	−8	59
15	Crewe Alexandra	46	17	5	24	62	75	−13	56
16	Stevenage	46	14	13	19	60	65	−5	55
17	Cheltenham Town	46	13	12	21	67	73	−6	51
18	Grimsby Town	46	13	12	21	42	66	−24	51

Source: BBC Sport
Rules for classification: 1) Points; 2) Goal difference; 3) Number of goals scored

==== Result summary ====
Overall								Home						Away					
Pld	W	D	L	GF	GA	GD	Pts	W	D	L	GF	GA	GD	W	D	L	GF	GA	GD
27	9	7	11	37	40	−3	34	6	5	2	27	16	+11	3	2	9	10	24	−14

Last updated: 13 January 2018.

==== Results by matchday ====
Matchday	1	2	3	4	5	6	7	8	9	10	11	12	13	14	15	16	17	18	19	20	21	22	23	24	25	26	27	28	29	30	31	32	33	34	35	36	37	38	39	40	41	42	43	44	45	46	47	48
Ground	H	A	H	A	A	H	H	A	H	A	H	A	A	H	H	A	H	A	H	A	H	A	H	A	A	H	A	H	A	H	A	H	A	H	A	H	A	H	A	H	A	H	A	H	A			
Result	D	D	W	W	W	L	D	L	W	W	W	L	L	W	L	L	D	L	D	L	D	L	W	L	L	W	D	D	W	L	L	D	L	W	L	W	L	D	D	L	D	W	W	D	L	L	W	L
Position	10	20	8	3	2	5	7	11	9	6	6	7	9	7	9	11	13	13	13	15	16	16	15	15	15	15	15																					

Updated to match(es) played on 13 January 2018. Source: Statto.com
A = Away; H = Home; W = Win; D = Draw; L = Loss

==== Matches ====
On 21 June 2017, the league fixtures were announced.

5 August 2017 1	Stevenage	3–3	Newport County	Stevenage
15:00 BST	Pett 11'; Gorman 61' (pen.); Newton 72'	Report	Nouble 55'; Demetriou 77'; McCoulsky 90+4'	Stadium: Lamex Stadium; Attendance: 2,650; Referee: Martin Coy

12 August 2017 2	Colchester United	1–1	Stevenage	Colchester
15:00 BST	Mandron 65'	Report	Newton 51'	Stadium: Weston Homes Community Stadium; Attendance: 3,330; Referee: Antony Coggins

19 August 2017 3	Stevenage	3–1	Grimsby Town	Stevenage
15:00 BST	Smith (yellow card) 28' (goal) 45'; Newton 37'; Kennedy 65'; Gorman (yellow card) 81'; McKee (yellow card) 90+3'	Report	Rose (yellow card) 11'; Jones (red card) 58'; Collins 81'; Dixon (yellow card) 90'	Stadium: Lamex Stadium; Attendance: 2,793; Referee: Scott Oldham

26 August 2017 4	Barnet	0–1	Stevenage	Canons Park
15:00 BST		Report	Pett 27' (yellow card) 64'; Gorman (red card) 35'	Stadium: The Hive Stadium; Attendance: 1,883; Referee: Richard Clark

2 September 2017 5	Cheltenham Town	0–1	Stevenage	Cheltenham
15:00 BST	Storer (yellow card) 75'	Report	Whelpdale (yellow card) 59'; Wilkinson (yellow card) 70'; Martin 82'; Fryer (yellow card) 90+5'	Stadium: LCI Rail Stadium; Attendance: 2,694; Referee: Craig Hicks

9 September 2017 6	Stevenage	1–2	Lincoln City	Stevenage
15:00 BST	Godden 26'; Wilkinson (red card) 82'	Report	Eardley (yellow card) 36'; Green (yellow card) 45' (yellow-red card) 52'; Raggett 58'; Palmer 75' (pen.); Bostwick (yellow card) 81'; Woodyard (yellow card) 87'; Farman (yellow card) 90+3'	Stadium: Broadhall Way; Attendance: 3,427; Referee: Anthony Backhouse

12 September 2017 7	Stevenage	1–1	Crawley Town	Stevenage
19:45 BST	Newton 45+1'	Report	Meite 49'	Stadium: Broadhall Way; Attendance: 1,922; Referee: Andy Haines

16 September 2017 8	Swindon Town	3–2	Stevenage	Swindon
15:00 BST	Norris 9', 62' (pen.) (yellow card) 45+2'; Anderson 13'; Robertson (yellow card) 53'; Dunne (yellow card) 68'; Hussey (yellow card) 75'; Lancashire (yellow card) 88'	Report	Newton 51' (yellow card) 79'; Martin 89'; Godden (yellow card) 90'	Stadium: County Ground; Attendance: 6,022; Referee: John Brooks

23 September 2017 9	Stevenage	2–1	Morecambe	Stevenage
15:00 BST	Godden 27'; Wootton 66'; Gorman (yellow card) 90'	Report	Old 36'; Thompson (yellow card) 75'	Stadium: Broadhall Way; Attendance: 1,996; Referee: John Busby

26 September 2017 10	Carlisle United	0–2	Stevenage	Carlisle
19:45 BST	Joyce (yellow card) 53'; Grainger (yellow card) 76'; Bennett (yellow card) 90+3'	Report	Godden (yellow card) 24'; Kennedy 51'; Pett 60'	Stadium: Brunton Park; Attendance: 3,701; Referee: Michael Salisbury

30 September 2017 11	Stevenage	2–0	Port Vale	Stevenage
15:00 BST	Newton 22'; Smith 54'	Report	Anderson (yellow card) 75' de Freitas (yellow card) 76'	Stadium: Broadhall Way; Attendance: 2,678; Referee: Charles Breakspear

7 October 2017 12	Crewe Alexandra	1–0	Stevenage	Crewe
15:00 BST	Nolan (yellow card) 36'; Bowery 90+4'	Report	Conlon (yellow card) 34'; Franks (yellow card) 42'; Wilkinson (yellow card) 44'	Stadium: Gresty Road; Attendance: 3,679; Referee: Trevor Kettle

14 October 2017 13	Luton Town	7–1	Stevenage	Luton
15:00 BST	Berry 3', 21', 62'; Hylton 7', 52' (pen.); Justin 90'; Gambin 90+3'	Report	Smith (yellow card) 11'; Martin (yellow card) 22'; Kennedy 45+2'	Stadium: Kenilworth Road; Attendance: 9,208; Referee: Brett Huxtable

17 October 2017 14	Stevenage	3–2	Accrington Stanley	Stevenage
19:45 BST	Godden 61', 83'; Smith (yellow card) 71'; Kennedy 89'	Report	Clark 19'; Jackson (yellow card) 56'; Kee 64' (pen.)	Stadium: Broadhall Way; Attendance: 1,788; Referee: Gavin Ward

21 October 2017 15	Stevenage	1–2	Forest Green Rovers	Stevenage
15:00 BST	Smith (yellow card) 21'; Godden 43'; King (yellow card) 90+2'	Report	Brown 61'; Doidge 73'; Iacovitti (yellow card) 81'; Bennett (yellow card) 83'	Stadium: Broadhall Way; Attendance: 2,099; Referee: Lee Collins

28 October 2017 16	Yeovil Town	3–0	Stevenage	Yeovil
15:00 BST	Surridge 24', 40'; Olomola 27' (red card) 63'; Bailey (yellow card) 42'; Zoko (red card) 82'	Report	King (yellow card) 28'; Martin (yellow card) 64'; Toner (red card) 65'; Gorman (yellow card) 88'	Stadium: Huish Park; Attendance: 2,439; Referee: Chris Sarginson

11 November 2017 17	Stevenage	1–1	Notts County	Stevenage
15:00 GMT	Newton 38'; Wilkinson (yellow card) 41'; Henry (yellow card) 45+1'; Samuel (yellow card) 83'; Martin (yellow card) 90+4'	Report	Hewitt (yellow card) 36' (goal) 58'; Hawkridge (yellow card) 38'	Stadium: Broadhall Way; Attendance: 2,962; Referee: Ross Joyce

18 November 2017 18	Mansfield Town	1–0	Stevenage	Mansfield
15:00 GMT	Hemmings 24'	Report	Newton (yellow card) 17'; King (yellow card) 71'	Stadium: Field Mill; Attendance: 3,353; Referee: Tom Nield

21 November 2017 19	Stevenage	1–1	Coventry City	Stevenage
19:45 GMT	Pett 76'	Report	McNulty 22'; Shipley (yellow card) 31'	Stadium: Broadhall Way; Attendance: 2,544; Referee: Kevin Johnson

25 November 2017 20	Cambridge United	1–0	Stevenage	Cambridge
15:00 GMT	Lewis (yellow card) 22'; Dunk (yellow card) 77'; Ikpeazu 88'	Report	Henry (yellow card) 30'	Stadium: Abbey Stadium; Attendance: 4,039; Referee: Brett Huxtable

9 December 2017 21	Stevenage	0–0	Wycombe Wanderers	Stevenage
15:00 GMT	Pett (yellow card) 44'; Whelpdale (yellow card) 82'	Report	Jacobson (yellow card) 50'	Stadium: Broadhall Way; Attendance: 2,430; Referee: Scott Duncan

16 December 2017 22	Exeter City	2–1	Stevenage	Exeter
15:00	James 53'; Sweeney 71'; McAlinden (yellow card) 74'; Pym (yellow card) 80'; Stockley (yellow card) 86'; Archibald-Henville (yellow card) 87'	Report	Martin (yellow card) 71'; Godden 80'	Stadium: St James Park; Attendance: 3,448; Referee: (England) Trevor Kettle

23 December 2017 23	Stevenage	5–1	Chesterfield	Stevenage
15:00	Newton 13'; Gorman 28'; McCourt 44' (o.g.); Godden 50' 72'; Fryer (yellow card) 90+5'	Report	Dennis 42'; Hird (yellow card) 45+2'	Stadium: Lamex Stadium; Attendance: 2,403; Referee: (England) Craig Hicks

26 December 2017 24	Lincoln City	3–0	Stevenage	Lincoln
15:00	Anderson 34'; Green 63'; Ginnelly 80'	Report		Stadium: Sincil Bank; Attendance: 9,268; Referee: (England) Carl Boyeson

30 December 2017 25	Crawley Town	1–0	Stevenage	Crawley
15:00	Boldewijn 33'; Payne (red card) 35'	Report	Godden (yellow card) 75'; King (yellow card) 77'; Gray (yellow card) 90+1'	Stadium: Checkatrade.com Stadium; Attendance: 2,075; Referee: (England) John Busby

1 January 2018 26	Stevenage	4–1	Cheltenham Town	Stevenage
15:00	Henry (yellow card) 20'; Godden 23'; Pett 35' 88'; Newton 69'	Report	Eisa 2'	Stadium: Lamex Stadium; Attendance: 1,989; Referee: (England) Gavin Ward

13 January 2018 27	Morecambe	1–1	Stevenage	Morecambe
15:00	Ellison 23'; Rose (yellow card) 34'; Wilding (yellow card) 60'; Old (yellow card) 79'	Report	Smith (yellow card) 25'; Newton (yellow card) 65'; Franks 89'	Stadium: Globe Arena; Attendance: 1,268; Referee: (England) Tom Nield

20 January 2018 28	Stevenage	0-0	Carlisle United	Stevenage
15:00 GMT	Kennedy (yellow card) 32'	Report	Bennett (yellow card) 24'	Stadium: Lamex Stadium; Attendance: 2,476; Referee: Charles Breakspear

27 January 2018 29	Chesterfield	0–1	Stevenage	Chesterfield
15:00	Maguire (yellow card) 31'; Nelson (yellow card) 54'	Report	Franks (yellow card) 47'; Kennedy 48'; Godden (yellow card) 58'; King (yellow card) 90+1'	Stadium: Proact Stadium; Attendance: 4,981; Referee: Mark Heywood

30 January 2018 30	Stevenage	0–1	Swindon Town	Stevenage
19:45 GMT	Vancooten (yellow card) 3'; Henry (yellow card) 45+2'; Amos (yellow card) 87'	Report	Banks 16'	Stadium: Broadhall Way; Attendance: 2,116; Referee: Darren Drysdale

3 February 2018 31	Accrington Stanley	3–2	Stevenage	Accrington
15:00 GMT	McConville 45+3', 78' (yellow card) 61'; Kee 70'; Dunne (yellow card) 56'	Report	Godden 14'; Wilmot (yellow card) 18'; McKee 38'; King (yellow card) 45+2'; Vancooten (yellow card) 61'	Stadium: Crown Ground; Attendance: 1,324; Referee: John Brooks

10 February 2018 32	Stevenage	1–1	Luton Town	Stevenage
15:00 GMT	Henry (yellow card) 84'; Newton 88'; Wilmot (yellow card) 89'	Report	Collins 85' (pen.), (yellow card) 86'; Stacey (yellow card) 90+6'	Stadium: Broadhall Way; Attendance: 4,365; Referee: Darren Handley

13 February 2018 33	Forest Green Rovers	3–1	Stevenage	Nailsworth
19:45	Reid 45+1'; Wishart (yellow card) 54'; Osbourne (yellow card) 56'; Rawson 61'; Doidge 81'	Report	Wilkinson 26'; Revell (red card) 30'; Henry (yellow card) 50'; Bowditch (yellow card) 90+2'	Stadium: The New Lawn; Attendance: 1,825; Referee: Graham Salisbury

17 February 2018 34	Stevenage	4–1	Yeovil Town	Stevenage
15:00 GMT	Amos 16'; Martin (yellow card) 37'; Smith 45+1'; Newton 46'; Kennedy 58'	Report	Khan (yellow card) 42'; Seager 76'; Wing (yellow card) 87'	Stadium: Broadhall Way; Attendance: 2,355; Referee: Nick Kinseley

24 February 2018 35	Notts County	2–0	Stevenage	Nottingham
15:00 GMT	Husin (yellow card) 67'; Grant 77'; Ameobi 80'	Report	Martin (yellow card) 43'	Stadium: Meadow Lane; Attendance: 5,684; Referee: Kevin Johnson

10 March 2018 36	Stevenage	2–2	Crewe Alexandra	Stevenage
15:00	Bowditch 14', 50'	Report	Ng 80'; Kirk 90+7'	Stadium: Broadhall Way; Attendance: 2,032; Referee: Graham Horwood

17 March 2018 37	Port Vale	2–2	Stevenage	Burslem
15:00 GMT	Wilson 65'; Hannant 77'	Report	Amos 10'; Kennedy 48'	Stadium: Vale Park; Attendance: 3,462; Referee: Anthony Backhouse

24 March 2018 38	Stevenage	0–1	Colchester United	Stevenage
15:00 GMT		Report	Mandron 27'	Stadium: Broadhall Way; Attendance: 2,709; Referee: Graham Salisbury

30 March 2018 39	Grimsby Town	0–0	Stevenage	Cleethorpes
15:00 BST		Report	Bowditch (yellow card) 90'	Stadium: Blundell Park; Attendance: 5368; Referee: Martin Coy

2 April 2018 40	Stevenage	4–1	Barnet	Stevenage
15:00 BST	Newton 44', 62'; Revell 67', 87'	Report	Coulthirst 82'	Stadium: Broadhall Way; Attendance: 3,350; Referee: Antony Coggins

7 April 2018 41	Newport County	0–1	Stevenage	Newport
15:00 BST	Butler (yellow card) 75'	Report	Sheaf (yellow card) 20'; Whelpdale 43'; Wilkinson (yellow card) 71'; Franks (yellow card) 90'	Stadium: Rodney Parade; Attendance: 4,007; Referee: Ollie Yates

10 April 2018 42	Stevenage	1–1	Mansfield Town	Stevenage
19:45 BST	Newton 15', (yellow card) 72'; Conlon (yellow card) 57'	Report	Byrom (yellow card) 17'; Hunt (yellow card) 36'; Atkinson 51'; White (yellow card) 63'; Pearce (yellow card) 90'	Stadium: Broadhall Way; Attendance: 2,294; Referee: Seb Stockbridge

14 April 2018 43	Stevenage	0–2	Cambridge United	Stevenage
15:00 BST		Report	Corr 54', 83'; Carroll (yellow card) 81'	Stadium: Broadhall Way; Attendance: 3,269; Referee: Tom Nield

20 April 2018 44	Coventry City	3–1	Stevenage	Coventry
19:45 BST	McNulty 2', 6'; Doyle (yellow card) 21'; Kelly 37'	Report	Revell 20'; Amos (yellow card) 25'; Wilkinson (red card) 40'; Martin (yellow card) 84'	Stadium: Ricoh Arena; Attendance: 8,859; Referee: Michael Salisbury

28 April 2018 45	Stevenage	3–1	Exeter City	Stevenage
15:00 BST	Revell 14', 31', 49'; Godden (yellow card) 41'; Georgiou (yellow card) 90+5'	Report	Croll (yellow card) 40'; Moxey (yellow card) 44'; Sweeney 78' (pen.)	Stadium: Broadhall Way; Attendance: 3,399; Referee: Dean Whitestone

5 May 2018 46	Wycombe Wanderers	1–0	Stevenage	High Wycombe
15:00 BST	Bloomfield 19'	Report		Stadium: Adams Park; Attendance: 8,802; Referee: Martin Coy

=== FA Cup ===
On 16 October 2017, Stevenage were drawn at home against Nantwich Town in the first round. Another home tie against Swindon Town was confirmed for the second round. A third home tie was announced for the third round, with Championship side Reading the visitors.

4 November 2017 First round	Stevenage	5–0	Nantwich Town	Stevenage
GMT	Godden 16', 76', 89'; Newton (yellow card) 35'; Smith (yellow card) 64' (goal) 68', 73'	Report		Stadium: Broadhall Way; Attendance: 1,436; Referee: Michael Salisbury

2 December 2017 Second round	Stevenage	5–2	Swindon Town	Stevenage
15:00 GMT	Samuel 18'; Godden 23'; Pett 45+3'; Smith (yellow card) 67'; Newton 72', 77'; Wilkinson (yellow card) 85'	Report	Linganzi 33'; Taylor 42'; Mullin (yellow card) 81'	Stadium: Broadhall Way; Attendance: 1,883; Referee: Nick Kinseley

6 January 2018 Third round	Stevenage	0–0	Reading	Stevenage
15:00 GMT	Newton (yellow card) 37'; Pett (yellow card) 90+3'	Report	Richards (yellow card) 56'; Bacuna (yellow card) 78'	Stadium: Broadhall Way; Attendance: 3,877; Referee: (England) Ben Toner

16 January 2018 3rd round replay	Reading	3–0	Stevenage	Reading
20:00 GMT	Böðvarsson 32', 44', 64'	Report	Newton (yellow card) 40'	Stadium: Madejski Stadium; Attendance: 4,986; Referee: Tim Robinson

=== EFL Cup ===
On 16 June 2017, Stevenage were drawn away to Millwall in the first round.

8 August 2017 First round	Millwall	2–0	Stevenage	Bermondsey
19:45 BST	Elliott 54', 67'	Report		Stadium: The Den; Attendance: 3,096; Referee: Simon Hooper

=== EFL Trophy ===
On 12 July 2017, Stevenage were drawn in Southern Group G alongside Brighton & Hove Albion U23s, Milton Keynes Dons and Oxford United.

Pos	Lge	Team	Pld	W	PW	PL	L	GF	GA	GD	Pts	Qualification
1	L1	Milton Keynes Dons (Q)	3	2	1	0	0	6	3	+3	8	Round 2
2	L1	Oxford United (Q)	3	1	0	1	1	11	8	+3	4	Round 2
3	L2	Stevenage (E)	3	1	0	1	1	5	7	−2	4	
4	ACA	Brighton & Hove Albion U21s (E)	3	0	1	0	2	3	7	−4	2	

Updated to match(es) played on 7 November 2017. Source: EFL.com
(E) Eliminated; (Q) Qualified to the phase indicated

29 August 2017 Group Game 1	Stevenage	2–6	Oxford United	Stevenage
19:45 BST	Beautyman 19'; Conlon (yellow card) 49'; Samuel 82'	Report	Henry 30'; Hall 43', 52'; Obika 50'; Xemi (yellow card) 53'; Rothwell 55'; Payne 64'	Stadium: Lamex Stadium; Attendance: 799

3 October 2017 Group Game 2	Milton Keynes Dons	0–0 (5–4 p)	Stevenage	Denbigh
19:45 BST	McGrandles (yellow card) 82'; Nombe (yellow card) 86'	Report	Toner (yellow card) 68'	Stadium: StadiumMK; Attendance: 2,031; Referee: Nick Kinseley
	Penalties
	Nesbitt (penalty scored); Seager (penalty scored); McGrandles (penalty scored); Nombe (penalty scored); Thomas-Asante (penalty scored)		Conlon (penalty scored); Whelpdale (penalty missed); Pett (penalty scored); Wilkinson (penalty scored); Newton (penalty scored)

7 November 2017 Group Game 3	Stevenage	3–1	Brighton & Hove Albion U23s	Stevenage
19:45 GMT	Samuel 19', 82'; Wootton 45+2' (pen.)	Report	Rosenior (yellow card) 45+1'; Murphy 90'	Stadium: Lamex Stadium; Attendance: 389; Referee: Charles Breakspear

== Transfers ==
=== Transfers in ===
Date from	Position	Nationality	Name	From	Fee	Ref.
1 July 2017	CM	(England)	Harry Beautyman	Northampton Town	Free	
1 July 2017	CM	(England)	James Ferry	Brentford	Undisclosed	
1 July 2017	LB	(England)	Joe Martin	Millwall	Free	
1 July 2017	CF	(England)	Danny Newton	Tamworth	Free	
1 July 2017	CF	(Wales)	Alex Samuel	Swansea City	Undisclosed	
1 July 2017	RW	(England)	Blair Turgott	Bromley	Free	
18 July 2017	CB	(England)	Terence Vancooten	Reading	Free	
28 July 2017	RM	(England)	Chris Whelpdale	AFC Wimbledon	Free	
2 August 2017	CB	(England)	Kevin Lokko	Maidstone United	Undisclosed	
7 August 2017	CM	(England)	Jonathan Smith	Luton Town	Free	

=== Transfers out ===
Date from	Position	Nationality	Name	To	Fee	Ref.
1 July 2017	LB	(England)	Andrew Fox	Free agent	Released	
1 July 2017	CF	(England)	Jake Hyde	Maidenhead United	Released	(Note: Jake Hyde joined Maidenhead United following his release.)
1 July 2017	RB	(Northern Ireland)	Nathan Kerr	Glentoran	Released	(Note: Nathan Kerr joined Glentoran following his release.)
1 July 2017	CM	(England)	Charlie Lee	Leyton Orient	Released	(Note: Charlie Lee joined Leyton Orient following his release.)
1 July 2017	LB	(South Africa)	Kgosi Ntlhe	Rochdale	Released	(Note: Kgosi Ntlhe joined Rochdale following his release.)
1 July 2017	CM	(England)	Michael Tonge	Port Vale	Released	(Note: Michael Tonge joined Port Vale following his release.)
1 July 2017	CB	(England)	Dean Wells	Boreham Wood	Released	(Note: Dean Wells joined Boreham Wood following his release.)
7 August 2017	GK	(England)	Jamie Jones	Wigan Athletic	Free	

=== Loans in ===
Start date	Position	Nationality	Name	From	End date	Ref.
1 July 2017	GK	(England)	Joe Fryer	Middlesbrough	30 June 2018	
31 August 2017	RW	(England)	Charlie Wakefield	Chelsea	30 June 2018	
31 August 2017	CF	(England)	Kyle Wootton	Scunthorpe United	January 2018	

=== Loans out ===
Start date	Position	Nationality	Name	To	End date	Ref.
15 July 2017	LB	(Northern Ireland)	Ryan Johnson	Boreham Wood	30 June 2018	
26 July 2017	CF	(England)	Dipo Akinyemi	Bishop's Stortford	30 June 2018	
4 August 2017	CB	(England)	Kevin Lokko	Dagenham & Redbridge	30 June 2018	
18 August 2017	CF	(England)	Rowan Liburd	Hemel Hempstead Town	18 September 2017	
8 September 2017	RW	(England)	Blair Turgott	Boreham Wood	10 December 2017	
18 October 2017	CF	(England)	Rowan Liburd	Guiseley	10 January 2018	
