= Mark McKee =

Northern Irish association football player

Personal information
- Full name: Mark Anthony McKee
- Date of birth: 1 December 1998 (age 27)
- Place of birth: Northern Ireland
- Height: 5 ft 10 in (1.78 m)
- Position: Midfielder

Team information
- Current team: Lisburn Distillery

Youth career
- 2014–2016: Cliftonville
- 2016–2017: Stevenage

Senior career*
Years	Team	Apps	(Gls)
2017–2019	Stevenage	33	(1)
2020–2021	Cliftonville	4	(1)
2020	Warrenpoint Town	2	(1)
2020–2021	Cliftonville	1	(0)
2021–2023	St James' Swifts		
2023-	Lisburn Distillery	35	(7)

International career^{‡}
2014–2016	Northern Ireland U17	17	(9)
2016–2018	Northern Ireland U19	8	(3)
2018	Northern Ireland U21	4	(2)
- * Club domestic league appearances and goals as of 00:31, 7 September 2021 (UTC) ‡ National team caps and goals as of 21 April 2017

Mark Anthony McKee (born 1 December 2003) is a Northern Irish professional footballer who plays as a midfielder for NIFL Premier Intermediate League club Lisburn Distillery.

McKee began his career at Cliftonville before signing a scholarship with English League Two club Stevenage in 2018. He broke into the Stevenage first-team during the 2018–19 season. McKee spent four years at Stevenage before being released by the club at the end of the 2020–21 season. He returned to Cliftonville in September 2020, before signing for Warrenpoint Town, also of the NIFL Premiership, in February 2021. McKee signed for Cliftonville for a third spell in October 2020, making one appearance there before joining St James' Swifts in July 2022. He has also represented Northern Ireland at under-17 and under-19 level.

== Club career ==
=== Early career ===
McKee began his career in the youth system at NIFL Premiership club Cliftonville, before signing for Stevenage for an undisclosed fee in the summer of 2017. The move came about after he had impressed then-Stevenage coach Darren Sarll who was watching a Northern Ireland under-16s match in Belfast. Sarll was there to finalise the signing of Nathan Kerr, but also ended up enquiring about McKee joining Stevenage on a scholarship contract.

=== Stevenage ===
He played in a number of Stevenage's pre-season friendlies ahead of the 2016–17 season, and subsequently signed his first professional contract in August 2016. He played predominantly for the club's under-18 team during the campaign, and signed "an extended deal" with the Hertfordshire club on 3 February 2017. McKee made his professional debut on 8 April 2017, coming on as a 71st minute substitute in a 4–0 away defeat to Colchester United. After the match, he was singled out for praise by manager Sarll, who stated "Mark can be anything he wants. He can be the best one we have ever blooded. In all the years back, even extending back to George Boyd, this boy can be a very good player". Two weeks later, on 22 April 2017, he made his first starting appearance, playing the opening 55 minutes in a 1–0 defeat to Mansfield Town at Broadhall Way.

Following on from his two appearances in the first-team the previous season, McKee opened the 2017–18 season with a place in the starting line-up, playing as a striker in Stevenage's 3–3 draw against Newport County on the opening day of the campaign. He made a sporadic number of appearances in the first three months of the campaign without cementing his place in the first-team. This changed after he was deployed in a midfield role in Stevenage's 1–1 home draw against Coventry City on 21 November 2017, for which he earned Man of the Match for his performance. Stevenage chairman Phil Wallace stated there had been transfer interest from a number of Championship and Premier League clubs for McKee during the 2018 January transfer window, with the club discouraging bids for the player as they believe he will develop faster playing first-team football as opposed to "being lost in the under-23 environment of a Premier League club". McKee scored his first professional goal on 3 February 2018, courtesy of a low drilled shot, in a 3–2 defeat at Accrington Stanley. He made 29 appearances during the campaign, scoring once, in what was McKee's breakthrough season as a first-team regular.

Despite playing regularly for Stevenage the previous campaign, McKee played just once during the first half of the 2018–19 season. He returned to the first-team as a 79th-minute substitute in a 1–0 home defeat to Bury on 9 March 2019. McKee ended the season coming on as a substitute in Stevenage's last four matches as the club finished in 10th-position in League Two, one point off of the play-off places. He made eight appearances during the season. McKee was released by Stevenage at the end of the season.

=== Cliftonville ===
McKee signed for NIFL Premiership club Cliftonville, the club he had played for at academy level, on 10 October 2019. He made his debut in Cliftonville's 3–0 away victory at Institute on 19 October 2019, coming on as an 83rd-minute substitute in the match. McKee made four appearances, scoring once in a 4–0 win against Warrenpoint Town, during the first half of the 2019–20 season. He subsequently joined Warrenpoint Town on 7 February 2020, scoring once in two games before the season was curtailed due to the COVID-19 pandemic. McKee rejoined Cliftonville on 5 October 2020 after spending time on trial with the club prior to the 2020–21 season, impressing manager Paddy McLaughlin with his attitude in training, as well as his performances in pre-season matches. He made one appearance during his third spell at Cliftonville.

=== St James' Swifts ===
McKee signed for Ballymena & Provincial League club St James' Swifts on 23 July 2021.

== International career ==
Having featured regularly for Northern Ireland's under-17 team for two years, McKee was then called up to the Northern Ireland under-19s in October 2016 for their three 2017 UEFA European under-19 Championship qualification group matches. He featured in all three matches, scoring once.

== Career statistics ==
As of match played 24 November 2020

Appearances and goals by club, season and competition
Club	Season	League			FA Cup		League Cup		Other		Total	
Club	Season	Division	Apps	Goals	Apps	Goals	Apps	Goals	Apps	Goals	Apps	Goals
Stevenage	2016–17	League Two	2	0	0	0	0	0	0	0	2	0
Stevenage	2017–18	League Two	24	1	3	0	1	0	1 (Note: Appearance(s) in the EFL Trophy)	0	29	1
Stevenage	2018–19	League Two	7	0	0	0	0	0	1	0	8	0
Stevenage	Total		33	1	3	0	1	0	2	0	39	1
Cliftonville	2019–20	NIFL Premiership	4	1	0	0	0	0	0	0	4	1
Warrenpoint Town	2019–20	NIFL Premiership	2	1	—		—		—		2	1
Cliftonville	2020–21	NIFL Premiership	1	0	0	0	0	0	0	0	1	0
Career total			40	3	3	0	1	0	2	0	46	3
