= List of Stevenage F.C. players =

Stevenage Football Club is an English association football club based in Stevenage, Hertfordshire. The club currently competes in EFL League Two. Formed as Stevenage Borough in 1976, following the demise of the town's former club, Stevenage Athletic, they joined the United Counties League in 1980 and progressed through the United Counties and Isthmian leagues over the following decade. The club achieved promotion to the Football Conference in 1994 and spent 16 consecutive seasons in the highest tier of non-League football, before being promoted to League Two in 2010. In their inaugural Football League season, Stevenage secured promotion to League One, the third tier of English football, and recorded their highest-ever league finish during the 2011–12 season. The club was relegated back into League Two at the conclusion of the 2013–14 season, before earning promotion back to League One during the 2022–23 season. Below is a list of players who have made 50 or more senior competitive appearances for the club. In addition to this, the table also includes players who hold club records.

== Introduction ==
More than 190 players have appeared in at least 50 senior competitive matches for the club since its formation in 1976. Defender Ronnie Henry holds the club record for the most appearances, with 502 accumulated over two spells. He surpassed the previous record of 468, held by Mark Smith, in January 2018. Smith had held the record for 17 years. Martin Gittings holds the club record for the most goals scored, with a total of 216. He is also the only player to have scored over 100 goals for the club, with Steve Morison coming closest, scoring 89 in all competitions.

The list also includes those who have received the Stevenage Player of the Year award. The Stevenage Player of the Year award is presented annually, based on a vote by the club's supporters, in recognition of the best overall performance by an individual player throughout the football season. Four players have won the award twice: Mark Smith in 1995 and 2001; Jason Goodliffe in 2002 and 2003; Mark Roberts in 2009 and 2012; and most recently, Carl Piergianni, in 2023 and 2024.

== Key ==
Players are listed according to the date of their first professional contract signed with the club. Appearances are for first-team competitive matches only. Substitute appearances are included. All figures are correct as of 25 August 2026.

Players who have won the 'Stevenage Player of the Year' award
Players who hold a record at the club

- Note: Players in **bold** are still playing for Stevenage.
Position
GK – Goalkeeper; DF – Defender; MF – Midfielder; FW – Forward

== List of players ==
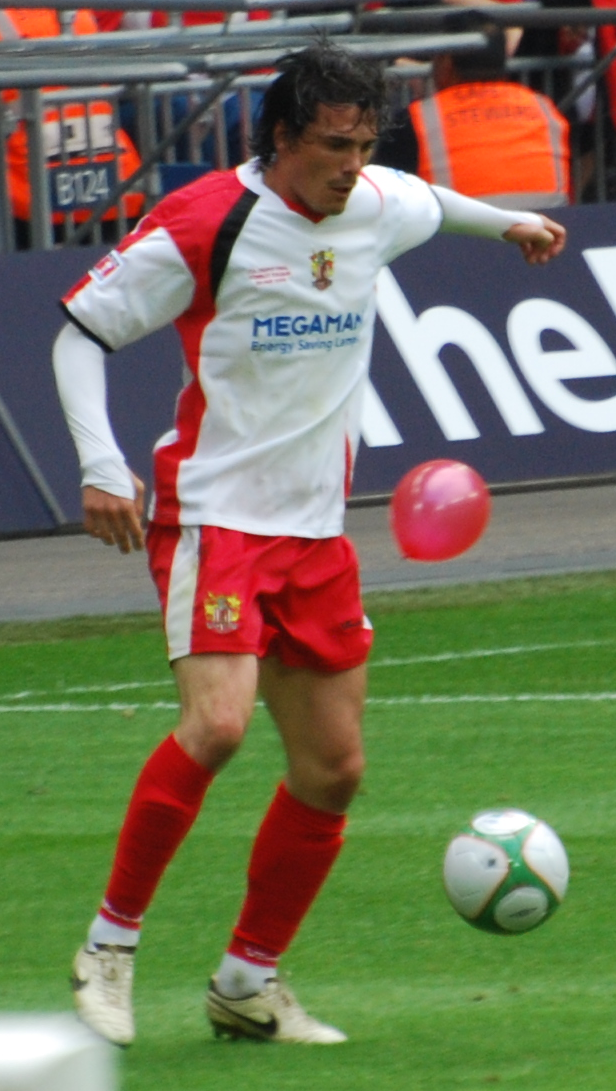
Ronnie Henry is Stevenage's all-time record appearance holder having made 502 appearances over two spells with the club.

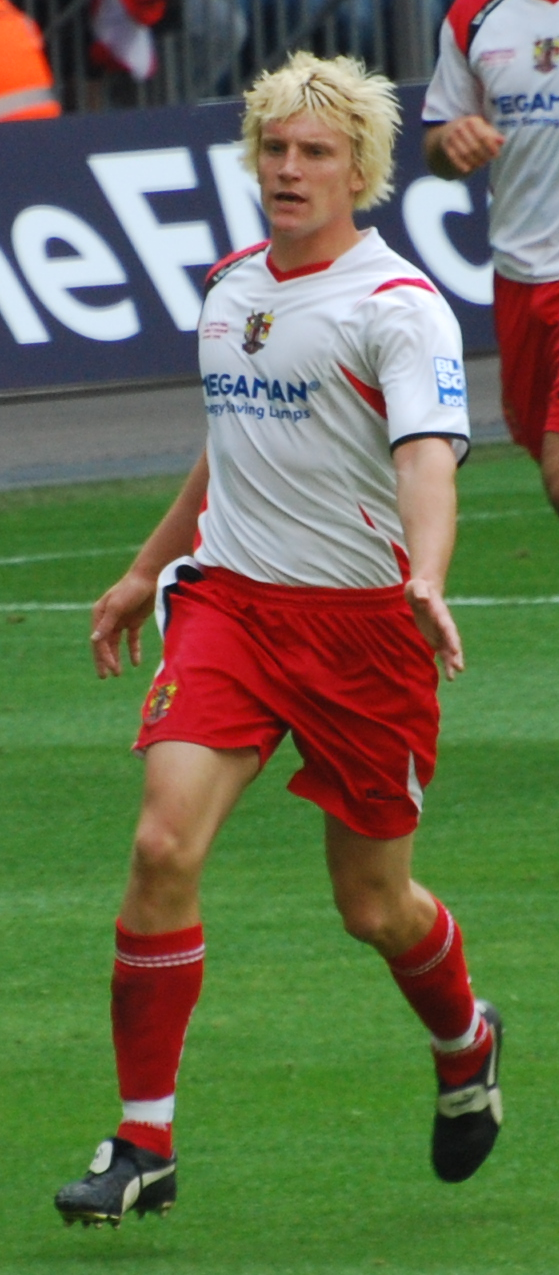
Mark Roberts captained the club through its most successful period, making 237 appearances between 2008 and 2013.

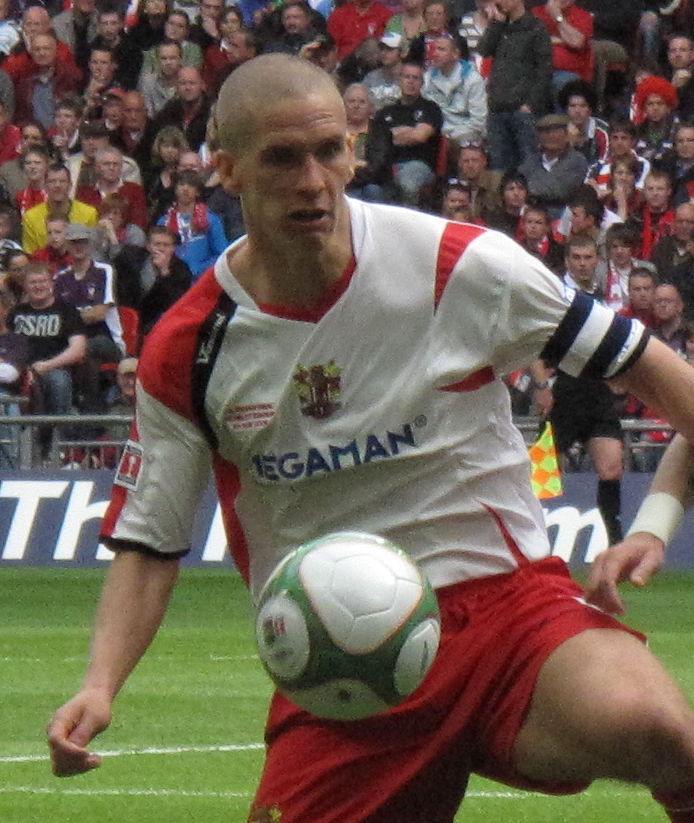
Steve Morison scored 89 goals for Stevenage in 152 appearances between 2006 and 2009.

Name	Nationality	Position	Stevenage career	Appearances (Note: Appearances and goals in the Football League (including play-offs), Football Conference (including play-offs), Conference League Cup, FA Cup, Football League Cup, Football League Trophy, FA Trophy, Isthmian League and United Counties League.)	Goals	Notes
Danny Dance	England	FW	1980–1982; 1986	101	48	
Peter Gittings	England	MF	1980–1982; 1985–1987	113	24	
Andy Hughes	England	MF	1980–1985	177	22	
Tim Jolly	England	FW	1980–1982	63	22	
Trevor Metcalfe	England	FW	1980–1984; 1988	119	53	
Doug Pirie	England	MF	1980; 1983–1989; 1991	159	20	
Martyn Thompson	England	GK	1980–1982; 1985–1987	65	0	
Mitch Dee	England	DF	1981–1983	83	2	
Martin Gittings	England	FW	1981–1994	401	216	(Note: Club record holder: Gittings holds the club record for total goals scored, with 216 goals between 1980 and 1995. He also won the Stevenage Player of the Year award for the 1993–94 season.)
Wes Atwell	England	FW	1982–1984	82	11	
Graham Cox	England	MF	1982–1990	318	58	
Mick Adamson	England	GK	1983–1984; 1987	93	0	
Paddy Butcher	England	FW	1983–1985	105	32	
Colin Cardines	England	FW	1983–1984; 1988–1989; 1990–1993	56	27	
Ricky Marshall	England	FW	1983–1988	208	48	
Denny Tyler	England	DF	1983–1988	257	9	
Steve Armsby	England	FW	1984–1987; 1990–1992	109	47	
Tim Ball	England	MF	1984–1987	91	2	
Peter Shadbolt	England	DF	1984–1987	88	1	
Phil Driver	England	FW	1985–1986	58	18	
Des Gallagher	England	GK	1985–1988; 1992–2000	369	1	
Lawrence Honey	England	DF	1985–1988	141	1	
Chris Myers	England	FW	1985–1988	112	31	
Richard Nugent	England	DF	1985–1986; 1989; 1993–1995	142	16	
David Watkins	England	DF	1985–1988	154	8	
Dave Brown	England	MF	1986–1987; 1990–1994	207	25	
Dave Cooper	England	DF	1986–1988	95	5	
Paul Cumberbatch	England	FW	1986–1988	87	20	
John Templeton	England	DF	1987–1989	83	6	
Mark Timpson	England	MF	1987–1990	93	27	
Noel Blackwell	England	DF	1988–1998	243	15	
Gary Bambrick	England	DF	1988–1990	93	2	
Jimmy Hughes	England	FW	1988; 1990–1991	71	36	
Shaun Marshall	England	FW	1988–1996	198	51	
Mark Taverner	England	MF	1988–1990	73	6	
Steve Taverner	England	DF	1988–1990	63	4	
Gary Williams	England	FW	1988–1990	72	30	
Lee Bozier	England	GK	1989–1990	55	0	
Shaun Debnam	England	MF	1989–1994	191	27	
Tony Martin	England	DF	1989–1991	109	0	
Rob McComb	England	FW	1989–1993	68	36	
Miguel Luque	England	MF	1990–1994	149	4	
Colin McGill	England	DF	1990–1991; 1993–1994	66	3	
Duncan Hardy	England	MF	1990–1992	68	18	
Tony Ward	England	MF	1990–1993	59	7	
Lee Western	England	GK	1990–1991	51	0	
Ian Whitehead	England	DF	1990–1992	110	1	
Paul Bowgett	England	DF	1991–1993	97	6	
Mickey Nunn	England	MF	1991–1993	51	5	
Andy Walker	England	FW	1991–1992	53	10	
Richard Wilmot	England	GK	1991–1998	161	0	
Mark Smith	England	DF	1992–2001; 2003–2004	468	29	
Neil Trebble	England	FW	1992–1994; 1996–1998	141	44	
Steve Graham	England	MF	1992–1994	84	7	
Stuart Beevor	England	MF	1993–1999	183	19	
Rudi Hedman	England	DF	1993–1995	77	4	
Gary Crawshaw	England	FW	1994–1998	147	52	
Tony Joyce	England	DF	1993–1994	68	0	
Efe Sodje	Nigeria	DF	1994–1997	137	13	
Dave Venables	England	MF	1993–1996	159	44	
Barry Hayles	Jamaica	FW	1994–1997	154	76	(Note: Former club record holder: Hayles was sold to Bristol Rovers for £250,000 in 1997, then a club-record transfer fee received by Stevenage. He won the 1995–96 Stevenage Player of the Year award.)
Phil Simpson	England	MF	1994–1995	65	7	
Tony Lynch	England	FW	1994–1996	85	19	
Kenny Webster	England	DF	1995–1997	85	8	
Corey Browne	England	FW	1995–1997; 2000	93	35	
Paul Barrowcliff	England	MF	1995–1997	109	12	
Steve Berry	England	MF	1995–1996; 1998–1999	82	2	(Note: Captain honours: Berry captained the club to the Conference National title in the 1995–96 season.)
Robbie Mutchell	England	DF	1995–1997	99	1	
Ryan Kirby	England	DF	1996–2001	167	7	
Michael Love	England	DF	1997–2000	124	12	
Jason Soloman	England	MF	1997–1998	53	8	
Robin Trott	England	DF	1997–2003	191	12	
Carl Alford	England	FW	1998–2000	95	59	
Lee Howarth	England	DF	1998–2000	82	2	
Lee Harvey	England	DF	1998–2000	93	0	
Chris Taylor	England	GK	1998–2001	103	0	
Paul Armstrong	England	FW	1999–2002	67	10	
Dean Martin	England	MF	1999–2001	60	7	
Richard Leadbeater	England	FW	1999–2001	60	12	
Sam McMahon	England	MF	1999–2003	114	11	
Nathan Bunce	England	DF	2000–2001; 2003–2004	67	3	
Adrian Clarke	England	MF	2000–2002	85	19	
Neil Illman	England	FW	2000–2002	58	17	
Martin Williams	England	MF	2001–2003	56	5	
Lee Boylan	England	FW	2001; 2008–2011	69	22	
Jason Goodliffe	England	DF	2001–2007	158	15	
Simon Wormull	England	MF	2001–2004	98	11	
George Boyd	Scotland	MF	2002–2007	126	32	(Note: Former club record holder: Boyd previously held the club record for the highest transfer fee received, £260,000, paid by Peterborough United in January 2007.)
Simon Travis	England	DF	2002–2004	72	1	
Mark Westhead	England	GK	2002–2005	54	0	
Jon Brady	Australia	MF	2003–2005	64	6	
Anthony Elding	England	FW	2003–2006	125	57	
Barry Laker	England	DF	2003–2006	118	5	
Dino Maamria	Tunisia	FW	2003–2006; 2009	108	38	
Lionel Pérez	France	GK	2003–2004	38	0	
Justin Gregory	England	DF	2003–2006	82	1	
Michael Warner	England	DF	2003–2006	112	0	
Michael Brough	England	MF	2004–2006; 2009	55	4	
Rob Quinn	Republic of Ireland	MF	2004–2006	69	2	
Dannie Bulman	England	MF	2004–2006	95	3	
Matt Hocking	England	DF	2004–2006	60	1	
Jon Nurse	Barbados	FW	2004–2007	106	21	
Ronnie Henry	England	DF	2005–2012; 2014–2019	502	4	(Note: Club record holder: Henry is the club's all-time record appearance holder, having made 502 appearances. Captain honours: Henry lifted the FA Trophy as club captain in May 2007, becoming the first player to lift a competitive trophy at the new Wembley Stadium. He won the 2006–07 Stevenage Player of the Year award.)
Alan Julian	Northern Ireland	GK	2005–2008; 2011–2012	166	0	
Darryn Stamp	England	FW	2005–2007	62	21	
Santos Gaia	Brazil	DF	2006–2007	58	2	
John Nutter	England	DF	2006–2007	73	8	
Luke Oliver	England	DF	2006–2009	91	5	
Adam Miller	England	MF	2006–2008	68	13	
Craig Dobson	Jamaica	MF	2006–2008	75	16	
Barry Fuller	England	DF	2006–2008	76	1	
Steve Morison	Wales	FW	2006–2009	153	89	(Note: Captain honours: Morison captained the club to the FA Trophy in May 2009. He won the 2007–08 Stevenage Player of the Year award.)
Mitchell Cole	England	MF	2007–2010	144	23	
Daryl McMahon	Republic of Ireland	MF	2007–2009	74	10	
Lawrie Wilson	England	MF	2007–2012	192	15	
Peter Vincenti	England	MF	2008–2011	77	7	
Scott Laird	England	DF	2008–2012	230	23	
Mark Albrighton	England	DF	2008–2010	56	1	
Andy Drury	England	MF	2008–2010	74	12	
David Bridges	England	MF	2008–2011	82	14	
Michael Bostwick	England	MF	2008–2012; 2022–2023	257	21	
Chris Day	England	GK	2008–2018	361	0	
Mark Roberts	England	DF	2008–2013	237	27	(Note: Captain honours: Roberts captained the club to back-to-back promotions in the 2009–10 and 2010–11 seasons. He won the 2008–09 and 2011–12 Stevenage Player of the Year awards.)
Jon Ashton	England	DF	2009–2016	234	5	
Joel Byrom	England	MF	2009–2012; 2018–2020	153	14	
Chris Beardsley	England	FW	2009–2012; 2014–2015	149	26	
Yemi Odubade	Nigeria	FW	2009–2011	68	17	
Stacy Long	England	MF	2009–2012	89	10	
Darren Murphy	Republic of Ireland	MF	2008–2012	53	2	
John Mousinho	England	MF	2010–2012; 2014	83	12	
Darius Charles	England	DF	2010–2015	167	18	
Byron Harrison	England	FW	2010–2012; 2016	55	13	
Craig Reid	England	FW	2011–2012; 2014	61	8	
Luke Freeman	England	MF	2011–2014	129	17	
Robin Shroot	Northern Ireland	MF	2011–2014	75	11	
Lucas Akins	England	MF	2012–2014	86	15	
David Gray	Scotland	DF	2012–2014	58	0	
James Dunne	England	MF	2012–2014	59	7	
Greg Tansey	England	MF	2012–2014	62	9	
Filipe Morais	Portugal	MF	2012–2014	66	12	
Marcus Haber	Canada	FW	2012–2014	51	7	
Roarie Deacon	England	MF	2013–2015	58	1	
Dean Parrett	England	MF	2013–2016; 2019–2020	100	10	
Charlie Lee	England	MF	2014–2017	130	14	
Tom Pett	England	MF	2014–2018; 2020–2021	193	24	
Dean Wells	England	DF	2014–2017	97	7	
Chris Whelpdale	England	MF	2014–2016; 2017–2018	101	17	
Ben Kennedy	Northern Ireland	MF	2015–2020	167	31	
Tom Conlon	England	MF	2015–2018	71	2	
Dale Gorman	Northern Ireland	MF	2015–2018	71	3	
Michael Tonge	England	MF	2015–2017	61	3	
Fraser Franks	England	DF	2015–2018	120	8	
Jamie Jones	England	GK	2016–2017	57	0	
Luke Wilkinson	England	DF	2016–2019	119	8	
Matt Godden	England	FW	2016–2018	87	35	
Jack King	England	DF	2016–2018	76	3	
Danny Newton	England	FW	2017–2021	131	29	
**Terence Vancooten**	Guyana	DF	2017–2024; 2026–	218	3	
Joe Martin	England	DF	2017–2019; 2021	64	3	
Ben Wilmot	England	DF	2017–2018	15	0	(Note: Former club record holder: Wilmot was sold to Watford in May 2018 for a then club-record fee of over £1 million.)
Alex Revell	England	FW	2018–2019; 2020	57	13	
**Luther James-Wildin**	Antigua and Barbuda	DF	2018–	308	8	
Scott Cuthbert	Scotland	DF	2018–2022	107	6	
Paul Farman	England	GK	2018–2020	75	0	
Emmanuel Sonupe	England	MF	2018–2020	51	4	
Kurtis Guthrie	England	FW	2018–2020	62	19	
Ben Nugent	England	DF	2018–2020	64	1	
Elliott List	England	MF	2019–2025	201	35	
Charlie Carter	England	MF	2019–2022	80	10	
**Dan Kemp**	England	MF	2020; 2024–	107	18	
Arthur Read	England	MF	2020–2023	83	4	
Luke Norris	England	FW	2021–2023	122	37	
Jake Taylor	Wales	MF	2021–2023	104	4	
Jake Reeves	England	MF	2021–2023	85	5	
Jamie Reid	Northern Ireland	FW	2021–2026	248	69	
**Carl Piergianni**	England	DF	2022–	204	19	(Note: Captain honours: Piergianni captained the club to promotion during the 2022–23 season. He won the club's Player of the Year award in 2022–23 and 2023–24.)
Danny Rose	England	FW	2022–2023	52	9	
**Jordan Roberts**	England	FW	2022–	203	26	
Dan Sweeney	England	DF	2022–2026	135	9	
Taye Ashby-Hammond	England	GK	2022–2026	87	0	
Kane Smith	England	DF	2022–2025	67	1	
**Saxon Earley**	England	DF	2022–2023; 2025–	53	1	
Jake Forster-Caskey	England	MF	2023–2025	58	3	
Nick Freeman	England	MF	2023–2026	86	3	
Nathan Thompson	England	DF	2023–2024	51	1	
**Louis Thompson**	Wales	MF	2023–	129	6	
**Dan Butler**	England	DF	2023–	109	1	
Harvey White	England	MF	2023–2026	118	12	
**Lewis Freestone**	England	DF	2024–	73	4	
**Daniel Phillips**	Trinidad and Tobago	MF	2024–	91	1	
Charlie Goode	England	DF	2024–2026	69	2	
Filip Marschall	England	GK	2025–2026	53	0	(Note: Club record holder: Marschall was sold to Millwall in September 2026 for a club-record fee. He won the club's Player of the Year award for the 2025–26 season.)
