= Nathan Kerr =

Northern Irish footballer (born 1998)

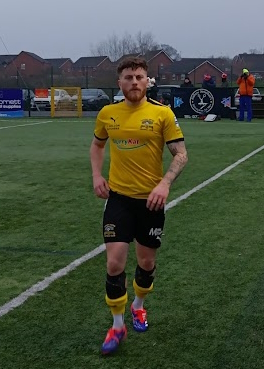

Personal information
- Date of birth: 20 January 1998 (age 28)
- Place of birth: Northern Ireland
- Positions: Full-back; midfielder

Team information
- Current team: Annagh United
- Number: 2

Youth career
- 2014–2016: Stevenage

Senior career*
Years	Team	Apps	(Gls)
2016–2017	Stevenage	3	(0)
2017–2019	Glentoran	63	(0)
2020–2022	Portadown	38	(0)
2022-	Annagh United	102	(9)

International career
	Northern Ireland U16	3	(0)
2014–2015	Northern Ireland U17	6	(0)
2016	Northern Ireland U19	5	(0)
2018–	Northern Ireland U21	7	(0)
- * Club domestic league appearances and goals as of 26 April 2026

Nathan Kerr (born 20 January 1998) is a semi-professional footballer who plays as a full-back for NIFL Championship side Annagh United. He has been capped by Northern Ireland up to under-19 level.

== Career ==
Kerr came through the youth team at Stevenage to sign his first professional contract in May 2016. Manager Darren Sarll had originally taken Kerr to the club's academy after seeing him captain Northern Ireland schoolboys to victory over England in the Victory Shield. He made his first team debut as a 77th-minute substitute for Ronnie Henry in a 3–1 defeat to Leyton Orient in an EFL Trophy group stage game at Brisbane Road on 30 August 2016. He made his League Two debut four days later, again replacing Henry, as Stevenage beat Hartlepool United 6–1 at Broadhall Way.

== Career statistics ==
As of 30 October 2016

Appearances and goals by club, season and competition
Club	Season	League			FA Cup		EFL Cup		Other		Total	
Club	Season	Division	Apps	Goals	Apps	Goals	Apps	Goals	Apps	Goals	Apps	Goals
Stevenage	2016–17	League Two	1	0	0	0	0	0	1 (Note: Appearance(s) in the EFL Trophy)	0	2	0
Career total			1	0	0	0	0	0	1	0	2	0
