= Jamie Gray (footballer) =

Irish footballer (born 1998)

Personal information
- Full name: Jamie Gray
- Date of birth: 13 April 1998 (age 28)
- Place of birth: Dublin, Ireland
- Height: 1.75 m (5 ft 9 in)
- Position: Forward

Team information
- Current team: Bromsgrove Sporting

Youth career
- 2012–2015: St Kevin's Boys
- 2015–2016: Stevenage

Senior career*
Years	Team	Apps	(Gls)
2016–2018	Stevenage	11	(0)
2018	→ Royston Town (loan)	2	(0)
2019–2020	Tolka Rovers		
2020–	Bromsgrove Sporting	0	(0)
- * Club domestic league appearances and goals as of 11:30, 19 November 2020 (UTC)

Jamie Gray (born 13 April 1998) is an Irish footballer who plays as a forward for Southern League Premier Division Central club Bromsgrove Sporting.

== Playing career ==
=== Stevenage ===
Gray joined Stevenage as an academy scholar in the summer of 2015, having previously played for Irish academy team St Kevin's Boys. Ahead of the 2016–17 season, he signed a three-year professional contract with Stevenage after playing in a number of pre-season friendlies. Gray made his professional debut on 22 April 2017, coming on as a 66th-minute substitute in a 1–0 home defeat to Mansfield Town. He made two further appearances towards the latter stages of the same season, both of which were as a second-half substitute.

Having played nine times for Stevenage during the first half of the 2017–18 season, all of which as a substitute, Gray was loaned out to Southern Football League Premier Division club Royston Town on 20 February 2018. The length of the loan was undisclosed. He made his debut for Royston Town on the same day, playing the opening 60 minutes in a 1–0 away defeat to Kings Langley. He made one further appearance during the loan agreement before returning to Stevenage. Gray was released by Stevenage upon the expiry of his contract in May 2018.

=== Tolka Rovers ===
In the summer of 2019, Gray signed for Leinster Senior League club Tolka Rovers.

=== Bromsgrove Sporting ===
Gray signed for Southern League Premier Division Central club Bromsgrove Sporting on 3 July 2020.

== Career statistics ==
As of match played 19 November 2020

Club	Season	League			FA Cup		League Cup		Other		Total	
Club	Season	Division	Apps	Goals	Apps	Goals	Apps	Goals	Apps	Goals	Apps	Goals
Stevenage	2016–17	League Two	3	0	0	0	0	0	0	0	3	0
Stevenage	2017–18	League Two	8	0	0	0	0	0	1 (Note: Appearance(s) in the EFL Trophy)	0	9	0
Stevenage	Total		11	0	0	0	0	0	1	0	12	0
Royston Town (loan)	2017–18	Southern League Premier Division	2	0	0	0	—		0	0	2	0
Bromsgrove Sporting	2020–21	Southern League Premier Central	0	0	0	0	—		0	0	0	0
Career total			13	0	0	0	0	0	1	0	14	0
