= Ronnie Henry =

English association football player

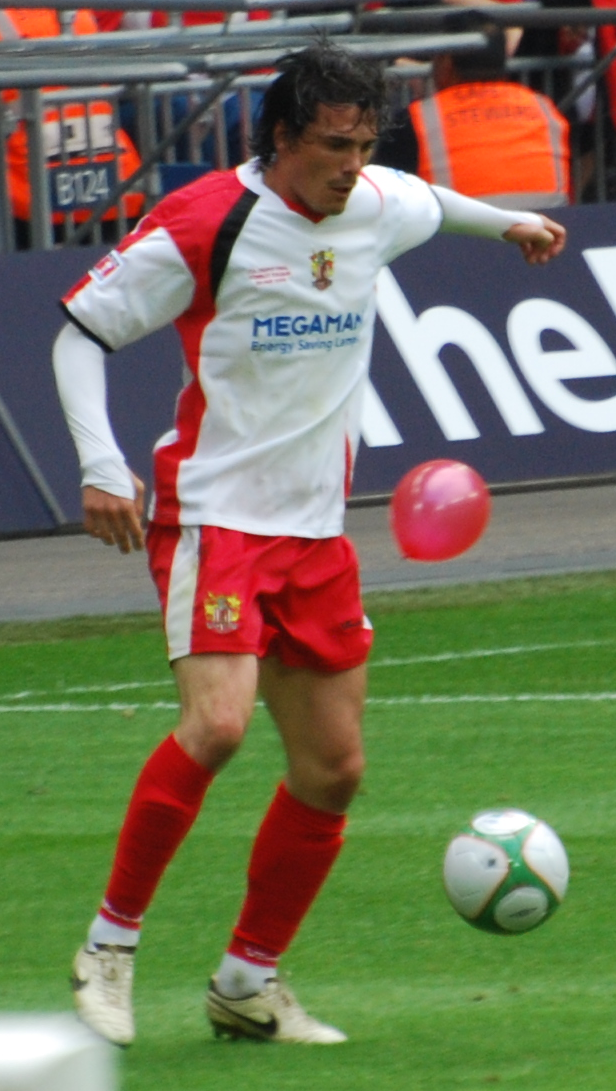
- Henry playing for Stevenage Borough in the 2009 FA Trophy Final

Personal information
- Full name: Ronnie Stephen Henry
- Date of birth: 2 January 1984 (age 42)
- Place of birth: Hemel Hempstead, England
- Height: 5 ft 11 in (1.80 m)
- Position: Defender

Team information
- Current team: Luton Town (PDP assistant coach)

Youth career
- –2002: Tottenham Hotspur

Senior career*
Years	Team	Apps	(Gls)
2002–2003	Tottenham Hotspur	0	(0)
2003	→ Southend United (loan)	3	(0)
2004	Dublin City		
2005–2012	Stevenage	280	(3)
2012–2014	Luton Town	76	(0)
2014–2019	Stevenage	156	(0)
2019–2021	Billericay Town	41	(0)
2021–2024	Royston Town	96	(5)
2024–2026	Potters Bar Town	59	(3)
2026	Kings Langley	3	(0)
Total		711	(11)

International career
2006–2008	England C	4	(0)
- * Club domestic league appearances and goals as of 14:08, 1 February 2026 (UTC)

Ronnie Stephen Henry (born 2 January 1984) is an English former professional footballer who played as a defender. He is a professional development phase assistant coach at Luton Town. Henry was the first player to lift a competitive trophy at the new Wembley Stadium, captaining Stevenage Borough to the FA Trophy in May 2007, and is the club's all-time record appearance holder.

Henry began his career in the youth academy at Tottenham Hotspur and spent the latter part of the 2002–03 season on loan at Southend United. Released by Tottenham in November 2003, he signed for Dublin City in August 2004, but left four months later owing to the club's financial difficulties. In January 2005, Henry joined Stevenage Borough, and was appointed club captain later that year. He captained the team to FA Trophy victories in 2007 and 2009, and was a regular in defence as Stevenage achieved successive promotions from the Conference Premier to League One.

After seven years at Stevenage, Henry signed for Luton Town in May 2012, where he was appointed captain and helped the club win the Conference Premier title in the 2013–14 season. He rejoined Stevenage in June 2014 and made a record 502 appearances for the club across his two spells there before departing in May 2019. He rejoined the club as an academy coach two months later while continuing his playing career with Billericay Town, Royston Town, Potters Bar Town, and Kings Langley, before retiring in January 2026. Internationally, Henry earned four caps for the England C team between 2006 and 2008.

== Early life ==
Henry was born on 2 January 1984 in Hemel Hempstead, Hertfordshire. He is the grandson of former Tottenham Hotspur defender Ron Henry. He has stated that his grandfather was greatly influential to him throughout his career.

== Club career ==
=== Early career ===
A product of the Tottenham Hotspur youth system, Henry signed a professional contract with the north London club at the age of 17. He was loaned to Southend United on 28 March 2003, for the remainder of the 2002–03 season. He made his professional debut for Southend in a 2–0 victory over Darlington at Roots Hall on 5 April 2003, and started two more matches during the loan spell. Henry was released by Tottenham in November 2003, having not made any first-team appearances for the club. Following his departure, Henry had an unsuccessful trial at Luton Town, who were in administration at the time. Having spent the rest of the 2003–04 season as a free agent, Henry signed a six-month contract with Irish club Dublin City in August 2004, but departed later that year due to the club facing financial problems.

=== Stevenage ===
Returning to England without a club, Henry signed for Conference National club Stevenage on an initial six-month contract in January 2005. He made his Stevenage debut in a 1–0 away victory at Gravesend & Northfleet in a Conference League Cup match on 25 January 2005. Four days later, on 29 January, he made his league debut for the club in a 3–1 home win over Farnborough Town, playing the full 90 minutes. Henry played regularly under manager Graham Westley for the remainder of the 2004–05 season, as Stevenage secured the final Conference National play-off place. He played in all three of the club's play-off matches, including the 1–0 Conference National play-off final defeat to Carlisle United. Henry remained at Stevenage for the 2005–06 season, making 35 appearances as the club missed out on a play-off position. During the season, he was appointed captain by Westley in the club's 2–0 victory over Exeter City.

Under the new management of Mark Stimson during the 2006–07 season, Henry made 49 appearances. Despite losing the captaincy early in the season to Luke Oliver, he regained the position later that season. Henry began the season in a central midfield role, before reverting to full-back following Stevenage's poor start to the season. He scored his first league goal for Stevenage on 3 April 2007, in a 2–1 home defeat against Kidderminster Harriers. Henry became the first player to lift a competitive trophy at the new Wembley Stadium after Stevenage defeated Kidderminster Harriers 3–2 in the 2007 FA Trophy Final on 12 May 2007. Having been a regular in the starting line-up during the first half of the 2007–08 season under both Mark Stimson and new manager Peter Taylor, Henry was placed on the transfer list in January 2008 after he was unable to agree terms on a new contract. Following the reappointment of Westley as manager, Henry signed a new contract and played regularly at right-back during the 2008–09 season, making 52 appearances. He played in all seven matches in the club's FA Trophy campaign that season, including the 2–0 victory against York City in the final at Wembley Stadium on 9 May 2009.

The following season, Henry continued as the club's first choice right-back, and scored his third goal for Stevenage in a 2–0 victory over Eastbourne Borough on 8 September 2009. The season proved successful both individually and collectively for Henry and Stevenage; he made 48 appearances and scored once as the club earned promotion to the Football League for the first time in its history, winning the Conference Premier title. At the Football Conference's annual presentation dinner, Henry was named in the Conference Premier Team of the Year, alongside fellow Stevenage defenders Scott Laird and Mark Roberts. A month into the 2010–11 season, he made his 250th appearance for Stevenage in a 0–0 draw at home to Torquay United, the club's first clean sheet of the season. After the match, manager Graham Westley stated: "he's a stalwart. He's been a tremendous servant for the club over the years. He's helped the club from where it was all the way in to the Football League". Henry played 51 matches during the club's first season in the Football League, as Stevenage earned promotion to League One via the play-offs, finishing the season with the best defensive record in the division.

Henry remained a first-team regular during the 2011–12 season, playing in the club's first League One match, a 0–0 draw with Exeter City on 6 August 2011. He made 40 appearances during the season, with the Stevenage defence proving strong once again. After spending seven years at Stevenage, Henry left the club upon the expiry of his contract in May 2012, having been informed by new manager Gary Smith that he was not part of his future plans. On leaving Stevenage, he stated: "I have had an absolutely unbelievable time with the club and I couldn't have wished to have spent seven years anywhere else. I just feel that now is my time to move on". He made 328 appearances during his first spell with Stevenage.

=== Luton Town ===
Henry joined Conference Premier club Luton Town on a free transfer on 16 June 2012, signing a two-year contract. He was named club captain for the 2012–13 season. Henry made his debut for Luton in the club's opening-day 2–2 draw against Gateshead at Kenilworth Road on 11 August 2012, playing the full match. He made 43 appearances during the 2012–13 season, but missed the latter part of the season due to a double hernia. He underwent surgery in April 2013 in order to be fit for pre-season training ahead of the 2013–14 season. He later stated he had been carrying the injury for a large part of the season, which inhibited his ability to attack up the right wing as often as he had at Stevenage. New Luton manager John Still retained Henry as club captain for the 2013–14 season. He captained Luton to the Conference Premier title and was part of a defence that kept a club-record 23 clean sheets.

=== Return to Stevenage ===
Shortly after helping Luton secure promotion back to the Football League, Henry rejected the offer of a new two-year contract and opted to rejoin his former club Stevenage on 30 June 2014. The move reunited him with manager Graham Westley, who had also returned to the Hertfordshire club a year earlier. Henry made his first appearance back at Stevenage three weeks into the 2014–15 season, on 30 August 2014, playing the full match in a 3–2 away victory at AFC Wimbledon, the club's first away win of the campaign. He played 38 games that season as Stevenage qualified for the League Two play-offs, losing at the semi-final stage. Henry made 34 appearances under managers Teddy Sheringham and Darren Sarll during the 2015–16 season. During the 2016–17 season, he played 38 times as Stevenage finished three points outside the League Two play-off places.

Henry became Stevenage's all-time record appearance holder on 13 January 2018; his appearance in the club's 1–1 away draw with Morecambe was his 469th for the club, surpassing the previous record held by Mark Smith. He signed a one-year contract extension on 23 April 2018, also taking on a coaching role in the club's academy as part of the new agreement. He made 45 appearances during the 2017–18 season. Henry was used sparingly during the 2018–19 season, making 19 appearances. That season, he made his 500th appearance for Stevenage in a 2–0 home victory over Swindon Town at Broadhall Way on 12 March 2019, coming on as an 85th-minute substitute in the match. He was honoured with a testimonial match at the end of the season, marking a career at Stevenage that had lasted nearly 15 years. The match took place on 6 May 2019, contested between the Stevenage 2009–10 Conference Premier winning team and a 'Ronnie Henry All-Star XI', which included players who had played alongside him throughout his career. Henry left Stevenage in a playing capacity on 24 May 2019. He made 502 appearances across his two spells with the club. He was appointed Youth Development Phase Coach of Stevenage's academy on 5 July 2019.

=== Billericay Town ===
Following his departure from Stevenage, Henry signed for National League South club Billericay Town on 11 June 2019. Henry made his Billericay debut on the opening day of the 2019–20 season, playing the full match in a 1–0 home victory over Eastbourne Borough on 3 August 2019. He was named Man of the Match for his performance. Henry made 35 appearances during the season, which was curtailed in March 2020 due to the COVID-19 pandemic. Having played nine times for Billericay during the opening three months of the 2020–21 season, the National League South season was curtailed in February 2021 due to restrictions associated with the COVID-19 pandemic. He left the club upon the conclusion of his contract at the end of the season.

=== Royston Town ===
After leaving Billericay, Henry joined Southern League Premier Central club Royston Town on 21 May 2021. Similar to his time at Billericay, Henry combined his playing role at Royston with coaching the under-18 and under-23 teams at Stevenage. The club stated that his leadership qualities and experience were key factors in their decision to sign him. Henry played regularly during his three years at Royston, scoring six goals in 115 appearances. He was named Player of the Year for both the 2022–23 and 2023–24 seasons. Henry left the club in May 2024.

=== Potters Bar Town ===
Henry joined Isthmian League Premier Division club Potters Bar Town on 6 June 2024 and was appointed captain for the 2024–25 season. His son, Louie, had played for Potters Bar on loan during the previous season, and Henry stated that he had been impressed by the club's set-up. Louie returned to the club for a second loan spell in January 2025, meaning father and son played alongside each other for two months. Henry scored two goals in 46 appearances during the season, as Potters Bar finished the season in 14th place.

=== Kings Langley ===
After making 22 appearances for Royston during the first half of the 2025–26 season, Henry joined Spartan South Midlands Premier Division club Kings Langley on 15 January 2026. He made his debut two days later in an 8–0 victory against Baldock Town. Henry suffered a fractured fibula during a 1–0 defeat to Colney Heath on 31 January 2026, after which he announced his retirement.

== International career ==
Henry was named in the England C team, who represent England at non-League level, in January 2006, for a friendly against Italy, playing the whole match in a 3–1 victory. After earning another cap in a win over Scotland C, Henry captained the England C team in a 2–0 victory against Finland C. He retained the captaincy for a 2–1 win against a Wales team consisting of players under the age of 23.

== Style of play ==
Henry started his career as a centre-back. He was later deployed at right-back, where he has played for the majority of his career. Towards the end of his second spell at Stevenage, and during his time at Billericay Town, Henry was once again used in central defence. He is known for his leadership qualities, having been named club captain during both spells at Stevenage, as well as during his time at Luton and Billericay.

== Coaching career ==
After six years as an academy coach at Stevenage, Henry returned to former club Luton Town as Professional Development Phase Assistant Coach in January 2025.

== Personal life ==
Henry's son, Louie, is also a footballer.

== Career statistics ==
Appearances and goals by club, season and competition
Club	Season	League			FA Cup		League Cup		Other		Total	
Club	Season	Division	Apps	Goals	Apps	Goals	Apps	Goals	Apps	Goals	Apps	Goals
Tottenham Hotspur	2002–03	Premier League	0	0	0	0	0	0	—		0	0
Tottenham Hotspur	2003–04	Premier League	0	0	0	0	0	0	—		0	0
Tottenham Hotspur	Total		0	0	0	0	0	0	0	0	0	0
Southend United (loan)	2002–03	Third Division	3	0	0	0	0	0	0	0	3	0
Dublin City	2004	League of Ireland Premier Division	Season statistics not known									
Stevenage	2004–05	Conference National	11	0	0	0	—		7 (Note: Four appearances in Conference League Cup; three appearances in 2005 Conference National play-offs)	0	18	0
Stevenage	2005–06	Conference National	32	0	1	0	—		2 (Note: One appearance in Football League Trophy; one appearance in FA Trophy)	0	35	0
Stevenage	2006–07	Conference National	39	1	2	0	—		8 (Note: Appearance(s) in FA Trophy)	0	49	1
Stevenage	2007–08	Conference Premier	35	1	1	0	—		2 (Note: One appearance in the FA Trophy, one appearance and one goal in the Conference League Cup)	1	38	2
Stevenage	2008–09	Conference Premier	44	0	1	0	—		7 (Note: Five appearances in FA Trophy; two appearances in 2009 Conference Premier play-offs)	0	52	0
Stevenage	2009–10	Conference Premier	36	1	3	0	—		6	0	45	1
Stevenage	2010–11	League Two	42	0	4	0	1	0	4 (Note: One appearance in Football League Trophy; three appearances in 2011 League Two play-offs)	0	51	0
Stevenage	2011–12	League One	32	0	6	0	1	0	1 (Note: Appearance(s) in Football League Trophy)	0	40	0
Stevenage	Total		271	3	18	0	2	0	37	1	328	4
Luton Town	2012–13	Conference Premier	33	0	7	0	—		3	0	43	0
Luton Town	2013–14	Conference Premier	43	0	1	0	—		0	0	44	0
Luton Town	Total		76	0	8	0	0	0	3	0	87	0
Stevenage	2014–15	League Two	34	0	2	0	0	0	2 (Note: One appearance in Football League Trophy; one appearance in 2015 League Two play-offs)	0	38	0
Stevenage	2015–16	League Two	31	0	2	0	0	0	1	0	34	0
Stevenage	2016–17	League Two	33	0	1	0	2	0	2	0	38	0
Stevenage	2017–18	League Two	40	0	4	0	1	0	0	0	45	0
Stevenage	2018–19	League Two	18	0	0	0	0	0	1	0	19	0
Stevenage	Total		156	0	9	0	3	0	6	0	174	0
Billericay Town	2019–20	National League South	32	0	3	0	—		0	0	35	0
Billericay Town	2020–21	National League South	15	0	1	0	—		1	0	17	0
Billericay Town	Total		47	0	4	0	0	0	1	0	52	0
Royston Town	2021–22	SFL Premier Division Central	28	1	0	0	—		12 (Note: Six appearances in Southern League Cup; four appearances and one goal in Herts Senior Cup; two appearances in FA Trophy)	1	40	2
Royston Town	2022–23	SFL Premier Division Central	35	3	2	0	—		2	0	39	3
Royston Town	2023–24	SFL Premier Division Central	33	1	2	0	—		1	0	36	1
Royston Town	Total		96	5	4	0	0	0	15	1	115	6
Potters Bar Town	2024–25	Isthmian League Premier Division	39	2	1	0	—		6 (Note: Two appearances in FA Trophy; one appearance in Alan Turvey Trophy; three appearances in Herts Senior Cup)	0	46	2
Potters Bar Town	2025–26	Isthmian League Premier Division	20	1	2	0	—		0	0	22	1
Potters Bar Town	Total		59	3	3	0	0	0	6	0	68	3
Kings Langley	2025–26	Spartan South Midlands Premier Division	3	0	0	0	—		0	0	3	0
Career total			711	11	46	0	5	0	68	2	830	13

== Honours ==
Stevenage

- Football League Two play-offs: 2011
- Conference Premier: 2009–10
- FA Trophy: 2006–07, 2008–09; runner-up: 2009–10

Luton Town

- Conference Premier: 2013–14

Individual

- Stevenage Player of the Year: 2006–07
- Conference Premier Team of the Year: 2009–10
