= Darren Sarll =

English footballer, coach, and manager

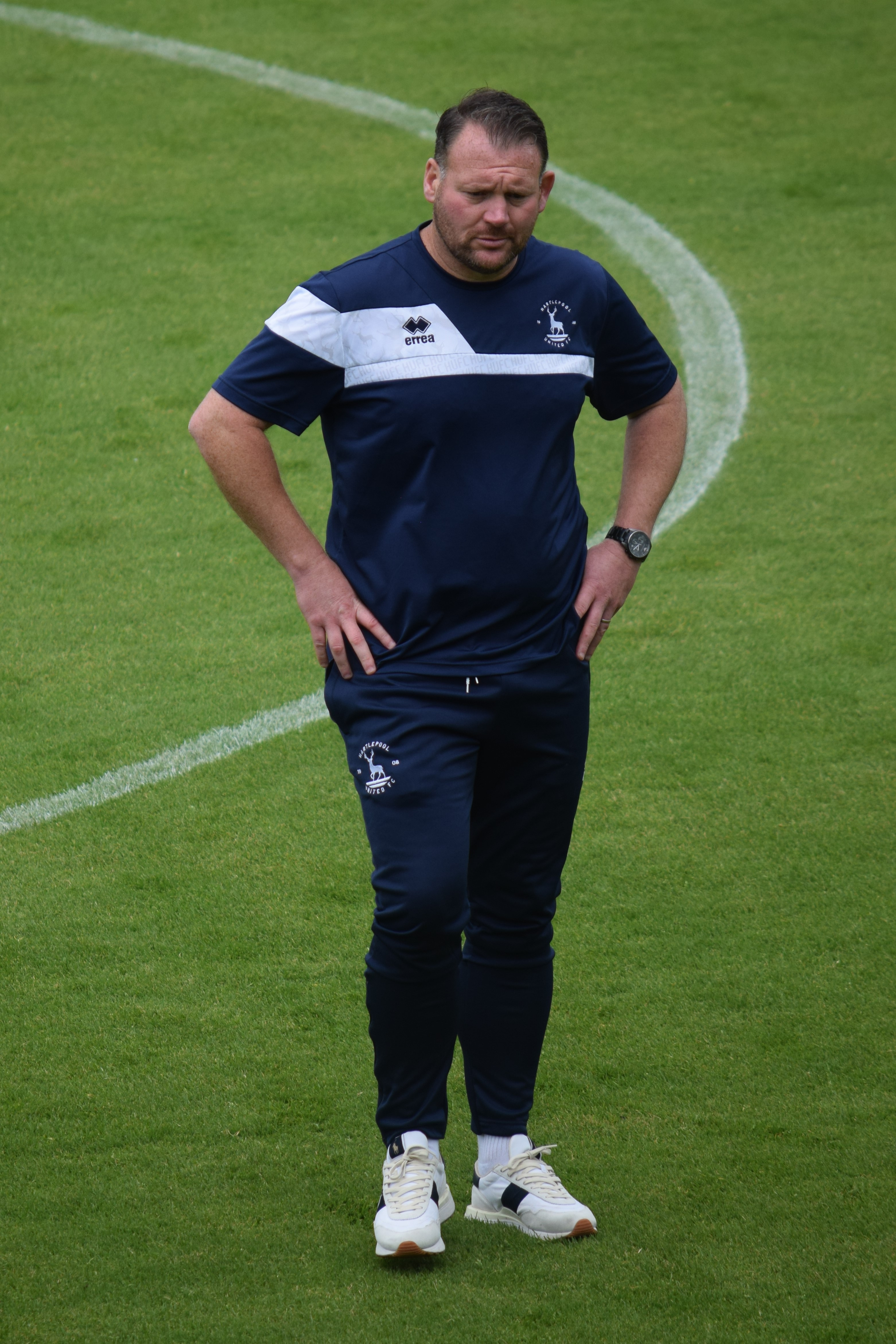
- Sarll coaching before a Hartlepool United game in 2024

Personal information
- Date of birth: 2 February 1983 (age 43)
- Place of birth: Hitchin, England
- Position: Midfielder

Team information
- Current team: Kamloops United (technical director head of coaching)

Youth career
- –1999: Ipswich Town
- 1999–2001: Hitchin Town

Senior career*
Years	Team	Apps	(Gls)
2001–2002	Hitchin Town	38	(0)
2002	Berkhamsted Town		
2002–2004	Bedford Town	72	(0)
2004	St Albans City	8	(0)
2004	→ Chelmsford City (loan)	5	(0)
2004–2005	Dunstable Town	25	(0)
2005–2006	Hemel Hempstead Town	14	(0)
2006	Chesham United	8	(0)
- Biggleswade United

Managerial career
- 2016–2018: Stevenage
- 2019–2022: Yeovil Town
- 2022–2023: Woking
- 2024: Hartlepool United
- * Club domestic league appearances and goals

Darren Sarll (born 2 February 1983) is an English professional football manager and coach. He is currently technical director and head of coaching at League1 British Columbia club Kamloops United.

Sarll began his career in football as a midfielder in non-League football and entered management with English Football League club Stevenage in 2016. Following his departure in 2018, he managed National League clubs Yeovil Town, Woking and Hartlepool United.

== Playing career ==
A midfielder, Sarll began his career in the Ipswich Town youth system and later joined the youth team at Isthmian League Premier Division club Hitchin Town, from which he graduated into the first team, before departing in 2002. He subsequently played in the Conference South, the Southern League and the Spartan South Midlands League for Berkhamsted Town, Bedford Town, St Albans City, Chelmsford City, Dunstable Town, Hemel Hempstead Town, Chesham United and Biggleswade United. After taking up coaching and dropping out of non-League football, he moved into Sunday league football.

== Managerial and coaching career ==
=== Stevenage Borough ===
Sarll began his coaching career with Conference club Stevenage Borough and served as a coach in a variety of youth and reserve roles. During the 2006–07 season, he managed the youth team to the final of the Colwyn Cup, which was lost to Dunstable Town.

=== Brentford ===
Sarll joined League Two club Brentford as youth team manager prior to the beginning of the 2008–09 season. After the promotion of first team assistant manager Andy Scott to the full-time managerial post halfway through the season, Sarll also assisted Scott as first team coach and also became the first manager of the reformed reserve team in 2009. He left the club at the end of the 2010–11 season.

=== Rotherham United ===
Sarll followed Andy Scott to League Two club Rotherham United in July 2011 and took over the role of Head of Player Development. After Scott's sacking in March 2012, Sarll departed the Don Valley Stadium at the end of the 2011–12 season.

=== Return to Stevenage ===
Sarll returned to Stevenage, then having risen through the pyramid to League One, in June 2012. He held the role of Head of Youth until 2 June 2015, when he was promoted to first team coach after the appointment of Teddy Sheringham as manager. After the sacking of Sheringham on 1 February 2016, Sarll was named as caretaker manager. Five days later, Sarll's first match in charge resulted in a 1–0 League Two defeat to Crawley Town. After losing six of his first 9 matches, Stevenage sought the services of Glenn Roeder to advise Sarll. Under Sarll's guidance, Stevenage ended the season with one loss from their final 9 matches and rose from the relegation places to finish 18th. Sarll was given the manager's job on a permanent basis in May 2016.

The 2016–17 season proved to be one of inconsistency, despite an undefeated run of eight wins in 9 matches establishing the club in the play-off zone by March 2017. 16 points from six matches in February won Sarll the League Two Manager of the Month award. Any promotion hopes were extinguished with a winless run in the final six matches of the season and the club finished in 10th place. During the season, Sarll oversaw the transition of Dale Gorman, Jamie Gray, Mark McKee and Luke Wade-Slater from the academy set-up into the first-team. The 2017–18 season began with wins in six of the opening 11 matches, before the inconsistency of the previous seasons set in. Despite strengthening the squad with a number of new signings in January 2018, a run of just four wins from 26 league matches between October 2017 and March 2018 led to Sarll's sacking on 18 March 2018.

Two days after Sarll's departure as manager, chairman Phil Wallace stated he had a "very high opinion" of Sarll and that it was always his intention to keep him on in a "technical development role". Sarll was appointed to oversee all of the club's youth development, both domestically and overseas and he took up the new position on 28 March 2018, before departing Broadhall Way in June 2018.

=== Watford ===
On 13 June 2018, it was announced that Sarll had joined the academy at Premier League club Watford and he would work with the older age groups and share the role of Head of Academy. He was suspended, following allegations of bullying, on 30 January 2019 and "amicably parted ways" with the club two weeks later.

=== Yeovil Town ===
On 19 June 2019, Sarll signed a three-year contract to manage newly-relegated National League club Yeovil Town. He got off to a good start, taking maximum points in September 2019 to win the National League Manager of the Month award. The club's 2019–20 season ended with defeat in the National League playoff quarter-finals and a mid-table 2020–21 followed. Following a slow start to the 2021–22 season, Sarll won his second National League Manager of the Month award after four wins from five in November 2021. Sarll departed Huish Park on 28 March 2022.

=== Woking ===
On 28 March 2022, Sarll signed a two-year contract to manage National League club Woking. An impressive start to the season saw Woking firmly in the play-off picture, leading to Sarll winning the Manager of the Month award for November 2022. In the 2022–23 season, Woking finished in the play-offs. However, they lost 2–1 at home to Bromley in the play-off eliminator. On 13 November 2023, the club announced that Sarll had been relieved of his role as manager following a run of eight defeats in their previous ten matches which had left Woking 14th in the National League.

=== Hartlepool United ===
On 27 April 2024, Sarll was appointed manager of National League club Hartlepool United. Sarll had previously been strongly linked with the role earlier that year. Three days after his appointment, Hartlepool announced their retained list which he later described as one of the most challenging of his career. His first game in charge was a 1–0 away victory at former club Yeovil in the opening match of the 2024–25 season.

On 16 October 2024, Sarll was dismissed as Hartlepool manager after winning 4 of his 15 matches in charge with the club. His dismissal came one day after a 3–1 defeat to National League North club Brackley Town in the FA Cup fourth qualifying round. Hartlepool had failed to score in 6 of 7 matches before winning his final league match in charge against Sutton United.

=== Kamloops United ===
In August 2025, Sarll was appointed technical director and head of coaching at League1 British Columbia club Kamloops United.

== Career statistics ==
=== Player ===
Appearances and goals by club, season and competition
Club	Season	League			FA Cup		Other		Total	
Club	Season	Division	Apps	Goals	Apps	Goals	Apps	Goals	Apps	Goals
Hitchin Town	2000–01	Isthmian League Premier Division	14	0	0	0	3 (Note: 2 appearances in Isthmian League Full Members' Cup, 1 appearance in Herts Charity Cup)	0	17	0
Hitchin Town	2001–02	Isthmian League Premier Division	24	0	5	1	8 (Note: 3 appearances in Isthmian League Cup, 3 appearances in Herts Senior Cup, 1 appearance in FA Trophy, 1 appearance in Herts Charity Cup)	0	37	1
Hitchin Town	2002–03	Isthmian League Premier Division	0	0	―		1 (Note: Appearance in Herts Charity Cup)	0	1	0
Hitchin Town	Total		38	0	5	1	12	0	55	1
Bedford Town	2002–03	Isthmian League Premier Division	27	0	―		0	0	27	0
Bedford Town	2003–04	Isthmian League Premier Division	45	0	0	0	1 (Note: Appearance in Isthmian League Premier Division play-offs)	0	46	0
Bedford Town	Total		72	0	0	0	1	0	73	0
St Albans City	2004–05	Conference South	8	0	0	0	3 (Note: 1 appearance in Isthmian League Cup, 1 appearance in Herts Senior Cup, 1 appearance in Herts Charity Cup)	0	11	0
Chelmsford City (loan)	2004–05	Isthmian League Premier Division	5	0	―		0	0	5	0
Dunstable Town	2004–05	Southern League Premier Division	15	0	―		0	0	15	0
Dunstable Town	2005–06	Southern League First Division West	10	0	0	0	0	0	10	0
Dunstable Town	Total		25	0	0	0	0	0	25	0
Hemel Hempstead Town	2005–06	Southern League First Division West	14	0	―		0	0	14	0
Chesham United	2005–06	Southern League Premier Division	8	0	―		0	0	8	0
Career total			170	0	5	1	16	0	191	1

=== Manager ===
As of match played 15 October 2024

Managerial record by team and tenure
Team	From	To	Record					Ref
Team	From	To	P	W	D	L	Win %	Ref
Stevenage	1 February 2016	18 March 2018	114	41	26	47	36.0	
Yeovil Town	19 June 2019	28 March 2022	134	55	30	49	41.0	
Woking	28 March 2022	13 November 2023	80	35	16	29	43.8	
Hartlepool United	27 April 2024	16 October 2024	15	4	5	6	26.7	
Total			343	135	77	131	39.4	—

== Honours ==
=== As a manager ===
Individual

- EFL League Two Manager of the Month: February 2017
- National League Manager of the Month: September 2019, November 2021, November 2022
