= Danny Newton =

English footballer (born 1991)

Personal information
- Full name: Daniel James Newton
- Date of birth: 18 March 1991 (age 35)
- Place of birth: Liverpool, England
- Height: 5 ft 10 in (1.78 m)
- Position: Forward

Team information
- Current team: Harborough Town

Youth career
- 2009–2010: Hinckley United

Senior career*
Years	Team	Apps	(Gls)
2010–2012	Hinckley United	71	(17)
2012–2013	Nuneaton Town	9	(0)
2012	→ Hinckley United (loan)	11	(2)
2013	→ Barwell (loan)	7	(3)
2013	Barwell	12	(11)
2013–2014	Brackley Town	8	(0)
2014–2015	Leamington	54	(26)
2015–2017	Tamworth	75	(38)
2017–2021	Stevenage	115	(26)
2021–2022	Solihull Moors	35	(5)
2022–2023	Boreham Wood	37	(3)
2023–2025	Brackley Town	66	(26)
2025–	Harborough Town	30	(3)
2025–2026	→ Brackley Town (loan)	13	(0)
- * Club domestic league appearances and goals as of 18:07, 13 September 2026 (UTC)

Daniel James Newton (born 18 March 1991) is an English professional footballer who plays as a forward for National League North club Harborough Town.

Newton began his career at Hinckley United, where he broke into the first team in 2010 and spent two seasons. He subsequently joined National League North club Nuneaton Town, spending most of his time on loan back at Hinckley, and then at Barwell. He signed for Barwell on a permanent basis at the start of the 2013–14 season, before making the step up to join Brackley Town in October 2013. In January 2014, Newton signed for Leamington, where he was the club's top goalscorer during the 2014–15 season.

A move to Tamworth, also of the National League North, followed in May 2015. Newton signed for League Two club Stevenage ahead of the 2017–18 season, finishing as the club's top goalscorer and being named as Stevenage's Player of the Year during his first season. After four years at Stevenage, he joined Solihull Moors in August 2021 for one season, followed by a move to National League club Boreham Wood in July 2022. Newton returned to Brackley Town in May 2023 for two seasons, helping the club achieve promotion as National League North champions, before signing for Harborough Town in May 2025. Following a three-month loan at Brackley later that year, he returned as Harborough won the Southern League Premier Division Central title.

== Early life ==
Newton was born in Liverpool, Merseyside. His family relocated to Leicester when he was two years old and he grew up in the East Midlands.

== Career ==
=== Early career ===
Newton began his career at Conference North club Hinckley United, breaking into the first team during the latter stages of the 2009–10 season. He scored his first goal for the club in a 3–2 victory against Harrogate Town on 24 April 2010, coming on as a second-half substitute to score the match-winner in the 91st minute. Newton remained at Hinckley for the 2010–11 season, making 28 appearances and scoring three goals as the club finished 15th in the league. The 2011–12 season marked his breakthrough in terms of regular first-team starting appearances, as he made 48 appearances in all competitions, scoring 13 goals and forming a strike partnership with Andre Gray.

At the end of the 2011–12 season, Newton signed for Conference North club Nuneaton Town. Having made no appearances in Nuneaton's opening matches of the 2012–13 season, he was loaned back to Hinckley United in September 2012; the initial one-month loan was later extended to three months. He made 11 appearances and scored twice during the spell. Recalled by Nuneaton in November 2012, Newton made his debut as a 60th-minute substitute in a 1–0 FA Trophy defeat to Telford United on 24 November 2012. He made 10 appearances for Nuneaton in all competitions, before being loaned to Southern Football League club Barwell in March 2013 for the remainder of the season. Newton was sent off on his Barwell debut but went on to score three goals in seven matches, including his first in a 2–1 away victory against Kettering Town.

Newton left Nuneaton at the end of the 2012–13 season and joined Barwell on a permanent basis in the summer of 2013, with the club having been relocated from the Southern Football League to the Northern Premier League, on non-contract terms to start the 2013–14 season. He scored a 13-minute hat-trick in a 3–2 away win against Stafford Rangers on 20 August 2013 and tallied 11 goals in 13 matches during the opening two months, earning three Man of the Match awards. His form attracted interest from Conference North club Brackley Town, and he signed for them on 23 October 2013. Newton made eight appearances for Brackley, seven of which were as a substitute, debuting in a 3–2 victory against Boston United on 2 November 2013.

=== Leamington ===
After two months at Brackley, Newton joined fellow Conference North club Leamington in January 2014 on a contract until the end of the 2013–14 season, as part of a deal that saw Stefan Moore make the reverse move to Brackley. He made his debut on 11 January 2014, playing 78 minutes in a 0–0 away draw against Solihull Moors, and scored his first goal in a 2–1 defeat to Harrogate Town. Newton remained a first-team regular for the remainder of the season, scoring 10 goals in 18 appearances.

Newton signed a one-year contract extension to remain at Leamington for the 2014–15 season. He was appointed club captain midway through the season and scored 11 goals in the final 12 league matches, taking his tally for the season to 16, as Leamington were relegated to the Southern Football League. He was the club's top goalscorer and received three end-of-season awards, including the club's Player of the Year. Over his two-year spell, he made 60 appearances in all competitions, scoring 30 goals.

=== Tamworth ===
Newton joined National League North club Tamworth in May 2015 on a one-year contract for the 2015–16 season. He made his debut on 8 August 2015, playing the full 90 minutes in a 1–0 victory against North Ferriby United at The Lamb Ground. It took Newton 14 matches to score his first goals for the club, scoring a brace in a 4–0 away victory against Lowestoft Town on 24 October 2015. He scored four goals in a 5–3 win at Stalybridge Celtic on 23 January 2016, becoming the first Tamworth player to score four times in a single match since 1999. He finished the season with 10 goals in 36 appearances as Tamworth placed seventh in the National League North. In May 2016, he signed a new one-year contract extension to remain at the club for the following season.

He retained his place in the first team at Tamworth during the 2016–17 season, scoring his first goal of the season in a 2–1 victory against Telford United on 13 August 2016. A 91st-minute goal in a 5–2 victory at Alfreton Town served as the catalyst for Newton to go on a run of scoring 13 goals in 12 matches from late August to mid-November 2016, which included four separate braces. He maintained a consistent scoring record throughout the season, concluding with a further run of 13 goals in 12 matches. Newton finished the season as Tamworth's top scorer with 28 goals in 39 appearances. He was awarded five end-of-season honours, including the club's Player of the Year. Across his two seasons at Tamworth, Newton scored 39 goals in 79 appearances.

=== Stevenage ===
Newton was invited to the V9 Academy in June 2017, a programme founded by Jamie Vardy to help non-League footballers progress into the Football League. He attended the week-long camp, held at Manchester City's first-team campus, where he played in three friendlies and was watched by over 60 professional scouts. He attracted the attention of "a number of EFL clubs", before signing for League Two club Stevenage on a two-year contract on 19 June 2017. Newton made his debut on the opening day of the 2017–18 season, scoring in a 3–3 draw with Newport County at Broadhall Way. Newton scored his first brace for the club in Stevenage's 5–2 victory against Swindon Town in the FA Cup second round on 2 December 2017. His second goal, in which he won the ball in his own half before running the length of the pitch and rounding the goalkeeper, was voted the best goal of the round. Newton finished the season as the club's top goalscorer, with 16 goals in 51 appearances and was named the club's Player of the Year.

During the 2018–19 season, Newton was sidelined by a series of "little injuries", including an ankle problem that kept him out for a month. He returned on 3 November 2018, scoring the winning goal as a 60th-minute substitute in a 3–2 victory against Oldham Athletic. In February 2019, he underwent ankle surgery, initially expected to rule him out for the remainder of the season, but returned earlier than anticipated to score in a 2–2 away draw at Macclesfield Town on 23 March 2019. He finished the season with 29 appearances and six goals. Injury limited him to 10 appearances during the 2019–20 season and he did not play that season beyond September 2019. Newton signed a one-year contract extension on 22 August 2020, scoring five goals in 41 appearances during the 2020–21 season. He was released by Stevenage upon the expiry of his contract on 30 June 2021.

=== Solihull Moors ===
Newton signed for National League club Solihull Moors on a one-year contract on 2 August 2021. He made his debut for Solihull in the club's first game of the 2021–22 season, playing the full match in a 2–2 home draw against Wrexham. Newton made 42 appearances during the season, scoring seven goals, as Solihull were defeated in the 2022 National League play-off final. He was released by the club on 6 June 2022.

=== Boreham Wood ===
A free agent ahead of the 2022–23 season, Newton joined fellow National League club Boreham Wood on 1 July 2022. He scored on his debut in a 1–0 away victory over Southend United. Newton made 42 appearances in all competitions, including 21 starts, and scored three goals as Boreham Wood were defeated by Notts County in the National League play-off semi-final. He was released at the end of the season.

=== Brackley Town ===
Newton signed for National League North club Brackley Town on 24 May 2023, returning to the club having played for them 10 years earlier. He scored his first goal for Brackley, the winning goal in stoppage time, in a 2–1 victory against Buxton on 12 August 2023. Newton scored 19 times in 47 appearances during the 2023–24 season, including two appearances in the National League North play-offs, in which Brackley were defeated 2–1 in the final by Boston United. He was named Brackley's Supporters' Player of the Year at the end of the season and signed a new contract on 8 May 2024.

Newton broke his leg in Brackley's 2–1 home victory over Darlington on 9 November 2024, ruling him out for three months of the 2024–25 season. He returned in February 2025 and helped Brackley earn promotion to the National League, scoring the opening goal in a 5–0 victory against Farsley Celtic on 26 April 2025, the match that secured the National League North title.

=== Harborough Town ===
Newton signed for Southern League Premier Division Central club Harborough Town on 29 May 2025. After scoring four goals in 25 appearances during the opening three months of the season, he rejoined Brackley Town on loan on 22 November 2025 until January 2026. Following 16 appearances during the loan spell, he returned to Harborough on 2 March 2026, with manager Mitch Austin stating that the loan had achieved its aim of providing Newton with regular playing time. Newton scored on his return in a 3–0 away victory over Bishop's Stortford, and ended the season with six goals in 36 appearances as Harborough won the Southern League Premier Division Central title. He signed a one-year contract extension in June 2026.

== Style of play ==
Newton primarily plays as a forward, his preferred position. He has also been deployed on the left wing. His "relentless style of play" led to comparisons to Jamie Vardy, with Newton being described as not giving "defenders a moment's rest".

== Personal life ==
Newton is a supporter of Liverpool. Prior to turning professional in June 2017, he combined playing non-League football with working as a maintenance engineer at a factory producing lorry axles.

== Career statistics ==
As of match played 8 September 2026

Appearances and goals by club, season and competition
Club	Season	League			FA Cup		League Cup		Other		Total	
Club	Season	Division	Apps	Goals	Apps	Goals	Apps	Goals	Apps	Goals	Apps	Goals
Hinckley United	2009–10	Conference North	2	1	0	0	—		0	0	2	1
Hinckley United	2010–11	Conference North	28	3	0	0	—		0	0	28	3
Hinckley United	2011–12	Conference North	41	13	4	0	—		3 (Note: Appearance(s) in FA Trophy)	0	48	13
Hinckley United	Total		71	17	4	0	0	0	3	0	78	17
Nuneaton Town	2012–13	Conference North	9	0	0	0	—		1	0	10	0
Hinckley United (loan)	2012–13	Conference North	11	2	0	0	—		0	0	11	2
Barwell (loan)	2012–13	Southern League Premier Division	7	3	0	0	—		0	0	7	3
Barwell	2013–14	Northern Premier League Premier Division	12	11	1	0	—		0	0	13	11
Brackley Town	2013–14	Conference North	8	0	—		—		0	0	8	0
Leamington	2013–14	Conference North	18	10	—		—		0	0	18	10
Leamington	2014–15	Conference North	36	16	3	2	—		3 (Note: One appearance in FA Trophy; two appearances and two goals in Birmingham Senior Cup)	2	42	20
Leamington	Total		54	26	3	2	0	0	3	2	60	30
Tamworth	2015–16	National League North	36	10	1	1	—		0	0	37	11
Tamworth	2016–17	National League North	39	28	1	0	—		2	0	42	28
Tamworth	Total		75	38	2	1	0	0	2	0	79	39
Stevenage	2017–18	League Two	45	14	4	2	1	0	1 (Note: Appearance(s) in EFL Trophy)	0	51	16
Stevenage	2018–19	League Two	25	6	1	0	0	0	3	0	29	6
Stevenage	2019–20	League Two	10	2	0	0	0	0	0	0	10	2
Stevenage	2020–21	League Two	35	4	3	1	1	0	2	0	41	5
Stevenage	Total		115	26	8	3	2	0	6	0	131	29
Solihull Moors	2021–22	National League	35	5	2	1	—		5 (Note: Three appearances and one goal in FA Trophy, two appearances in 2022 National League play-offs)	1	42	7
Boreham Wood	2022–23	National League	37	3	3	1	—		2 (Note: Two appearances in 2023 National League play-offs)	0	42	4
Brackley Town	2023–24	National League North	45	19	0	0	—		2 (Note: Two appearances in 2024 National League North play-offs)	0	47	19
Brackley Town	2024–25	National League North	21	7	4	2	—		0	0	25	9
Brackley Town	Total		66	26	4	2	0	0	2	0	72	28
Harborough Town	2025–26	Southern League Premier Division Central	26	3	6	2	—		4 (Note: Three appearances and one goal in FA Trophy; one appearance in Leicestershire and Rutland Senior Cup)	1	36	6
Harborough Town	2026–27	National League North	4	0	0	0	—		0	0	4	0
Harborough Town	Total		30	3	6	2	0	0	4	1	40	6
Brackley Town	2025–26	National League	13	0	1	0	—		2 (Note: Appearances in National League Cup)	0	16	0
Career total			546	160	34	11	2	0	30	4	610	176

== Honours ==
Brackley Town:

- National League North: 2024–25

Harborough Town

- Southern League Premier Division Central: 2025–26

Individual

- Leamington Player of the Year: 2014–15
- Tamworth Player of the Year: 2016–17
- Stevenage Player of the Year: 2017–18
