= Rowan Liburd =

English-born Saint Kitts and Nevis footballer

Personal information
- Full name: Rowan Anthony Liburd
- Date of birth: 28 August 1992 (age 34)
- Place of birth: Croydon, England
- Height: 1.93 m (6 ft 4 in)
- Position: Forward

Team information
- Current team: Ramsgate

Youth career
- –2010: Chelsea

College career
Years	Team	Apps	(Gls)
2010–2013	Thomas Night Hawks	73	(44)

Senior career*
Years	Team	Apps	(Gls)
2014–2015	Billericay Town	30	(22)
2015–2016	Reading	3	(0)
2016	→ Wycombe Wanderers (loan)	10	(0)
2016–2017	Stevenage	13	(1)
2017	→ Leyton Orient (loan)	8	(0)
2017	→ Hemel Hempstead Town (loan)	7	(4)
2017	→ Guiseley (loan)	6	(3)
2017–2019	Guiseley	22	(14)
2019–2020	Hereford	27	(4)
2019–2020	→ Dartford (loan)	3	(0)
2020–2021	Welling United	8	(1)
2021–2022	Billericay Town	8	(5)
2021	→ Cheshunt (loan)	15	(14)
2022–2023	Cheshunt	34	(9)
2023	Ramsgate	18	(9)
2023–2024	Sevenoaks Town	18	(5)
2024–2025	Chatham Town	44	(11)
2025	Aveley	8	(0)
2025–2026	Cray Valley Paper Mills	21	(3)
2026–	Ramsgate	0	(0)

International career^{‡}
2019–	Saint Kitts and Nevis	15	(4)
- * Club domestic league appearances and goals as of 16:41, 24 July 2026 (UTC) ‡ National team caps and goals as of 17:00, 18 March 2024 (UTC)

Rowan Anthony Liburd (born 28 August 1992) is a footballer who plays as a forward for Ramsgate. Born in England, he represents Saint Kitts and Nevis internationally.

== Career ==
=== College ===
Liburd spent four years at Thomas University in Thomasville, Georgia on a football scholarship, where he won several awards including the Sun Conference Player of the Year.

=== Club ===
Upon returning to the UK, Liburd signed for Isthmian League side Billericay Town. In July 2015, Liburd signed a two-year contract with Championship side Reading after he had impressed scoring a brace in a 7–0 friendly win over Beaconsfield SYCOB during pre-season.

Liburd made his debut, for Reading in their 2–0 Championship defeat away to Cardiff City on 7 November 2015, coming on as a 63rd-minute substitute for Ola John.

On 4 March 2016, Liburd joined Wycombe Wanderers on an initial one-month loan deal. He made his debut for Wycombe against Newport County in Wycombe's 1–0 defeat on 5 March 2016, almost scoring the equalizer. Liburd's loan was extended until the end of the season on 7 April.

On 4 July 2016, Liburd joined Stevenage for an undisclosed fee. He scored his first goals for Stevenage when he scored twice in an EFL Trophy tie against Southend United on 8 November 2016.

On 31 January 2017, he joined Leyton Orient on loan until the end of the season. Prior to subsequent loans with Hemel Hempstead Town and Guiseley. In December 2017, Guiseley signed Liburd permanently.

Liburd signed for National League North club Hereford on 28 March 2019.

On 14 December 2019, Liburd joined Dartford on an initial month's loan.

After being released by Hereford, Liburd signed for National League South club Welling United on 13 September 2020.

Liburd signed for Isthmian Premier League side Cheshunt on loan from Billericay Town in November 2021. He made his debut for the club on 20 November 2021 in a 2-1 victory away to eventual Champions Worthing. He scored both of the goals. After scoring 14 goals in 15 games, Cheshunt purchased Liburd from Billericay for an undisclosed fee on 27 February 2022, after his loan move expired. He scored on his debut on the same day, at home to Kingstonian. Liburd scored 19 goals across all competitions for Cheshunt during the 21/22 season, helping them win the Hertfordshire Senior Cup for the first time in their history and promotion via the playoffs to the National League South.

On 20 January 2023, Liburd signed for Isthmian League South East Division leaders Ramsgate for an undisclosed fee.

In August 2023, Liburd joined Sevenoaks Town. In January 2024, he made the step up a level to join Chatham Town. In May 2025, he joined Aveley. He joined Cray Valley Paper Mills in November 2025.

In July 2026, he returned to Ramsgate.

== International career ==
On 23 March 2019, he was called up to the Saint Kitts and Nevis team for the CONCACAF Nations League qualifying game against Suriname in which he started.

== Career statistics ==
As of match played 4 December 2018

Appearances and goals by club, season and competition
Club	Season	League			FA Cup		League Cup		Other		Total	
Club	Season	Division	Apps	Goals	Apps	Goals	Apps	Goals	Apps	Goals	Apps	Goals
Billericay Town	2014–15	Isthmian League	30	22	0	0	0	0	0	0	30	22
Reading	2015–16	Championship	3	0	0	0	0	0	0	0	3	0
Wycombe Wanderers (loan)	2015–16	League Two	10	0	0	0	0	0	0	0	10	0
Stevenage	2016–17	League Two	13	1	1	0	2	0	2 (Note: Appearances in the EFL Trophy)	2	18	3
Leyton Orient (loan)	2016–17	League Two	8	0	—		—		—		8	0
Hemel Hempstead (loan)	2017–18	National League South	7	4	0	0	—		0	0	7	4
Guiseley (loan)	2017–18	National League	6	3	0	0	—		1 (Note: Appearance in the FA Trophy)	1	7	4
Guiseley	2017–18	National League	22	4	0	0	—		0	0	22	4
Guiseley	2018–19	National League	0	0	2	0	—		0	0	2	0
Career total			99	34	3	0	2	0	3	3	107	37

=== International goals ===
Scores and results list French Guiana's goal tally first.

No.	Date	Venue	Opponent	Score	Result	Competition
1.	8 September 2019	Warner Park, Basseterre, Saint Kitts and Nevis	French Guiana	2–2	2–2	2019–20 CONCACAF Nations League B
2.	10 October 2019	Isidoro Beaton Stadium, Belmopan, Belize	Belize	2–0	4–0	2019–20 CONCACAF Nations League B
3.	10 October 2019	Isidoro Beaton Stadium, Belmopan, Belize	Belize	3–0	4–0	2019–20 CONCACAF Nations League B
4.	10 October 2019	Isidoro Beaton Stadium, Belmopan, Belize	Belize	4–0	4–0	2019–20 CONCACAF Nations League B
