= Dale Gorman =

Irish association football player

Personal information
- Full name: Dale Anthony Gorman
- Date of birth: 28 June 1996 (age 30)
- Place of birth: Letterkenny, Ireland
- Height: 1.80 m (5 ft 11 in)
- Position: Midfielder

Team information
- Current team: Hednesford Town

Youth career
- 2010–2013: Letterkenny Rovers
- 2013–2015: Stevenage

Senior career*
Years	Team	Apps	(Gls)
2015–2018	Stevenage	62	(3)
2018–2020	Leyton Orient	35	(0)
2020	→ Newport County (loan)	8	(1)
2020–2021	Glentoran	24	(1)
2021–2022	Yeovil Town	40	(4)
2022–2024	Barnet	73	(6)
2024–2026	Woking	46	(2)
2026–	Hednesford Town	0	(0)

International career^{‡}
2012–2013	Northern Ireland U17	6	(0)
2013–2014	Northern Ireland U19	3	(0)
2015–2018	Northern Ireland U21	15	(1)

Managerial career
- 2026: Woking (joint-interim)
- * Club domestic league appearances and goals as of 15:46, 25 April 2026 (UTC) ‡ National team caps and goals as of 21:01, 16 October 2018 (UTC)

Dale Anthony Gorman (born 28 June 1996) is a Northern Irish professional footballer who plays as a midfielder for National League North club Hednesford Town.

Gorman began his career at hometown club Letterkenny Rovers before signing a scholarship with Stevenage in 2013. He broke into the Stevenage first-team during the 2015–16 season and spent three seasons in the first-team before leaving in May 2018. Gorman joined Leyton Orient of the National League ahead of the 2018–19 season, where he helped the club earn promotion back to the Football League in his first season there. He spent two seasons at Leyton Orient, during which he also spent time on loan at Newport County, before being released in June 2020. Gorman signed for Glentoran of the NIFL Premiership in September 2020. He has also represented Northern Ireland at under-17, under-19 and under-21 level.

Gorman returned to English football in the summer of 2021, spending the 2021–22 season with Yeovil Town before joining Barnet the following year. He captained Barnet during two successive play-off campaigns before agreeing to join Woking in May 2024, later moving to Hednesford Town ahead of the 2026–27 season.

== Early life ==
Gorman is the son of Sheila and coach and former Finn Harps player Anthony Gorman. He has two younger brothers called Zach and Joel. Gorman attended St Eunan's College for his secondary education. During his time there he captained the school team and played alongside Shaun Patton.

== Club career ==
=== Early career ===
Gorman began his career with his hometown club, Letterkenny Rovers. He attracted the attention of English club Stevenage after being scouted in a Northern Ireland under-17 match against Scotland. After Gorman had finished competing in qualifying for the 2013 European under-17 Championships, he was invited to train at Stevenage's academy, playing in a youth game against Bournemouth. He scored one goal and assisted another in the match, and he was subsequently offered a two-year scholarship. He signed the deal immediately, calling it a "no-brainer". His parents also had relatives living near the club.

=== Stevenage ===
Gorman officially joined Stevenage in May 2013, and spent the following two seasons in the club's youth set-up, competing for the club's under-18 and reserve teams, as well as playing at the IMG Cup in Florida for the Hertfordshire club. During his two years at academy level, Gorman also frequently trained with the first-team. In May 2015, he signed his first professional contract with the club.

Ahead of the 2015–16 season, Gorman featured in several of Stevenage's pre-season fixtures under new manager Teddy Sheringham. He made his professional debut in the club's second game of the new campaign, coming on as a second-half substitute in Stevenage's 2–1 away loss to Ipswich Town in the League Cup on 11 August 2015. Gorman made his first start a week-and-a-half later, playing the whole game as Stevenage secured their first win of the season courtesy of a 2–0 victory over Hartlepool United at Broadhall Way. Having made five first-team appearances during the first half of the season, Gorman signed an improved three-year contract with Stevenage in December 2015. He went on to make 14 appearances during his first season in professional football.

The 2016–17 season served as Gorman's breakthrough campaign as a first-team regular. His first appearance of the new season came at Portman Road in an EFL Cup game away at Championship opposition Ipswich Town, the same match and venue where he made his professional debut a year earlier. He played the whole match in a 1–0 Stevenage victory. It marked the start of a run of games in the first-team for the midfielder, and he scored his first professional goal on 17 December 2016, with a "curling strike" in a 2–1 away victory against local rivals Barnet. The following month, on 9 January 2017, Gorman signed a new contract with the club, running until 2019. Gorman scored once in 30 appearances during the season as the club finished in 10th-place in League Two. He made 27 appearances in all competitions during the 2017–18 season, scoring twice, as Stevenage finished the League Two campaign in 16th position. He was released in May 2018.

=== Leyton Orient ===
Following his departure from Stevenage, Gorman signed for National League club Leyton Orient on a two-year deal on 14 June 2018. He scored his first goal for Orient when he scored in an EFL Trophy tie against Southend United on 3 September 2019. On 10 January 2020 Gorman joined Newport County on loan for the remainder of the 2019-20 season. He made his debut for Newport County on 18 January 2020 in the 2-0 League Two win against Swindon Town as a second half substitute. He scored his first goal for Newport on 7 March 2020 in the 1-0 League Two win against Morecambe. He was released by Leyton Orient in June 2020 after his contract expired.

=== Glentoran ===
Gorman joined NIFL Premiership club Glentoran on 2 September 2020.

=== Yeovil Town ===
On 22 July 2021, Gorman signed for National League club Yeovil Town for an undisclosed fee. At the end of the 2021–22 season, Gorman rejected the offer of a new contract from Yeovil and departed following the expiry of his contract.

=== Barnet ===
On 2 July 2022, Gorman signed for Barnet. Over two seasons, he captained the side to two finishes in the playoffs, making 87 appearances and scoring eight goals.

=== Woking ===
Gorman joined Woking ahead of the 2024-25 season. On 1 March 2026, after the exit of first-team manager Neal Ardley, Gorman was appointed to take interim charge of the team alongside Jake Hyde and Craig Ross.

On 7 May 2026, it was announced that Gorman would leave the club at the end of his contract in June.

=== Hednesford Town ===
On 24 June 2026, Gorman agreed to join newly-promoted National League North side, Hednesford Town following his release from Woking.

== International career ==
Gorman decided to play for Northern Ireland in order to further his prospects of gaining a move to an English club. Having earned six caps for Northern Ireland's under-17 team from October 2012 to March 2013, Gorman made the step up to under-19 level following his move to Stevenage in the summer of 2013, receiving his first call-up at under-19 level in October 2013, and made three appearances at that level over the space of a year. A month after making his professional debut at Stevenage, Gorman was called up to the Northern Ireland under-21 team, making his debut on 5 September 2015, a game in which he was sent off for two bookable offences in a 2–1 home defeat to Scotland under-21s.

== Career statistics ==
As of match played 25 April 2026

Appearances and goals by club, season and competition
Club	Season	League			National Cup (Note: Includes FA Cup, Irish Cup)		EFL Cup		Other		Total	
Club	Season	Division	Apps	Goals	Apps	Goals	Apps	Goals	Apps	Goals	Apps	Goals
Stevenage	2015–16	League Two	13	0	0	0	1	0	0	0	14	0
Stevenage	2016–17	League Two	25	1	1	0	2	0	2 (Note: Appearances and goals in EFL Trophy)	0	30	1
Stevenage	2017–18	League Two	24	2	1	0	1	0	1	0	27	2
Stevenage	Total		62	3	2	0	4	0	3	0	71	3
Leyton Orient	2018–19	National League	22	0	1	0	—		5 (Note: Appearances and goals in FA Trophy)	1	27	1
Leyton Orient	2019–20	League Two	13	0	1	0	1	0	2	1	17	1
Leyton Orient	Total		35	0	2	0	1	0	7	2	45	2
Newport County (loan)	2019–20	League Two	8	1	—		—		—		8	1
Glentoran	2020–21	NIFL Premiership	24	1	2	0	—		—		26	1
Yeovil Town	2021–22	National League	40	4	5	1	—		2	0	47	5
Barnet	2022–23	National League	40	3	4	1	—		4 (Note: Three appearances in FA Trophy, one appearance in National League playoffs)	0	48	4
Barnet	2023–24	National League	33	3	2	0	—		4 (Note: Two appearances and one goal in FA Trophy, one appearance in Middlesex Senior Cup, one appearance in National League playoffs)	1	39	4
Barnet	Total		73	6	6	1	0	0	8	1	87	8
Woking	2024–25	National League	36	2	2	0	—		8 (Note: Four appearances in FA Trophy; Four appearancea in National League Cup)	0	46	2
Woking	2025–26	National League	10	0	0	0	—		0	0	10	0
Woking	Total		46	2	2	0	—		8	0	56	2
Hednesford Town	2026–27	National League North	0	0	0	0	—		0	0	0	0
Career total			288	17	19	2	5	0	28	3	340	22

== Honours ==
Leyton Orient

- National League: 2018–19
