= 2016–17 Stevenage F.C. season =

Stevenage
2016–17 season
- Chairman: Phil Wallace
- Manager: Darren Sarll
- League Two: 10th
- FA Cup: First Round
- EFL Cup: Second Round
- EFL Trophy: Group Stage
- Top goalscorer: League: Matt Godden (20); All: Matt Godden (21)
Home colours	Away colours

The 2016–17 season was Stevenage's third consecutive season in League Two and their 41st year in existence. Along with competing in League Two, the club also participated in the FA Cup, League Cup and Football League Trophy. The season covers the period from 1 July 2015 to 30 June 2016.

== Transfers ==
=== Transfers in ===
Date from	Position	Nationality	Name	From	Fee	Ref.
1 July 2016	LB	(England)	Andrew Fox	Peterborough United	Free transfer	
1 July 2016	CF	(England)	Matt Godden	Ebbsfleet United	Undisclosed	
1 July 2016	GK	(England)	Jamie Jones	Preston North End	Free transfer	
4 July 2016	CF	(England)	Rowan Liburd	Reading	Undisclosed	
6 July 2016	CF	(England)	Jake Hyde	York City	Free transfer	
19 July 2016	LW	(Jamaica)	Jobi McAnuff	Leyton Orient	Free transfer	
31 August 2016	LB	(South Africa)	Kgosi Ntlhe	Peterborough United	Undisclosed	
17 September 2016	GK	(Wales)	Callum Preston	Altrincham	Free transfer	
31 January 2017	DM	(England)	Jack King	Scunthorpe United	Free transfer	

=== Transfers out ===
Date from	Position	Nationality	Name	To	Fee	Ref.
1 July 2016	LM	(England)	Charlie Adams	Real Monarchs (Note: Following Adams' release, he signed for Real Monarchs.)	Released	
1 July 2016	CM	(England)	Lee Cox	Brackley Town (Note: Following Cox's release, he signed for Brackley Town.)	Released	
1 July 2016	RM	(England)	Rohdell Gordon	Braintree Town (Note: Following Gordon's release, he signed for Braintree Town.)	Released	
1 July 2016	CM	(England)	Jack Jebb	Newport County (Note: Following Jebb's release, he signed for Newport County.)	Released	
1 July 2016	CF	(England)	Adam Marriott	Lincoln City (Note: Following Marriott's release, he signed for Lincoln City.)	Released	
1 July 2016	CM	(Republic of Ireland)	David McAllister	Free agent	Released	
1 July 2016	CF	(England)	Aaron O'Connor	Free agent	Released	
1 July 2016	LB	(England)	Jerome Okimo	Braintree Town (Note: Following Okimo's release, he signed for Braintree Town.)	Released	
1 July 2016	CM	(England)	Dean Parrett	AFC Wimbledon	Free transfer	
1 July 2016	CF	(England)	Jack Storer	Birmingham City	Undisclosed	
1 July 2016	RM	(England)	Chris Whelpdale	AFC Wimbledon	Free transfer	
1 July 2016	RW	(England)	Louis-Michel Yamfam	Charlton Athletic	Undisclosed	
18 August 2016	MF	(England)	George Casey	St Albans City	Free transfer	

=== Loans in ===
Date from	Position	Nationality	Name	From	Date until	Ref.
8 July 2016	CB	(Republic of Ireland)	Shaun Donnellan	West Bromwich Albion	1 January 2017	
15 August 2016	LW	(England)	Connor Hunte	Wolverhampton Wanderers	7 January 2017	
25 August 2016	CM	(England)	Henry Cowans	Aston Villa	7 January 2017	
30 August 2016	DM	(England)	Jack King	Scunthorpe United	3 January 2017	
31 August 2016	AM	(England)	Harry McKirdy	Aston Villa	7 January 2017	
31 August 2016	CF	(England)	Tyler Walker	Nottingham Forest	13 January 2017 (Note: On 13 January 2016, Tyler Walker's season-long loan was terminated.)	
7 January 2017	CF	(England)	Ryan Loft	Tottenham Hotspur	End of Season	
19 January 2017	CF	(England)	Josh McQuoid	Luton Town	End of Season	
24 January 2017	LB	(England)	Connor Ogilvie	Tottenham Hotspur	End of Season	
31 January 2017	SS	(England)	Kaylen Hinds	Arsenal	End of Season	

=== Loans out ===
Date from	Position	Nationality	Name	To	Date until	Ref.
1 August 2016	CF	(England)	Dipo Akinyemi	St Albans City	3 January 2017	
1 August 2016	LB	(Northern Ireland)	Ryan Johnson	St Albans City	3 January 2017	
31 January 2017	CF	(England)	Rowan Liburd	Leyton Orient	End of Season	

== Competitions ==
=== Pre-season friendlies ===
9 July 2016 Friendly	St Albans City	2–3	Stevenage	St Albans
15:00 BST	Theophanous 15'; Hill 60'	Report	Fox 46'; Hyde 66', 76'	Stadium: Clarence Park; Attendance: 420; Referee: Mick Russell

14 July 2016 Friendly	Stevenage	0–2	Watford	Stevenage
19:45 BST		Report	Capoue 50'; Sinclair 89'	Stadium: Broadhall Way; Referee: Darren Deadman

16 July 2016 Friendly	Bishop's Stortford	0–6	Stevenage	Bishop's Stortford
15:00 BST		Report	Lee 18'; Trialist 24'; Kennedy 40' (pen.); Conlon 73', 82'; Godden 90'	Stadium: The ProKit UK Stadium; Attendance: 275; Referee: Anthony Serrano

23 July 2016 Friendly	Stevenage	1–0	Brighton & Hove Albion	Stevenage
17:30 BST	Liburd 31'	Report		Stadium: Broadhall Way; Referee: Lee Collins

26 July 2016 Friendly	Boreham Wood	0–0	Stevenage	Borehamwood
19:30 BST		Report		Stadium: Meadow Park

30 July 2016 Friendly	Stevenage	4–1	Milton Keynes Dons	Stevenage
15:00 BST	Godden 1', 61'; Hyde 36'; Conlon 70'	Report	Upson 18'	Stadium: Broadhall Way; Referee: Charles Breakspeare

=== League Two ===
==== League table ====
Pos	Team	Pld	W	D	L	GF	GA	GD	Pts
8	Colchester United	46	19	12	15	67	57	+10	69
9	Wycombe Wanderers	46	19	12	15	58	53	+5	69
10	Stevenage	46	20	7	19	67	63	+4	67
11	Cambridge United	46	19	9	18	58	50	+8	66
12	Mansfield Town	46	17	15	14	54	50	+4	66

Updated to match(es) played on 6 May 2017. Source: BBC Sport
Rules for classification: 1) Points; 2) Goal difference; 3) Number of goals scored

==== Matches ====
6 August 2016 1	Stevenage	1–2	Crewe Alexandra	Stevenage
15:00 BST	Conlon (yellow card) 24'; Wilkinson (yellow card) 32'; Lee 90+4'	Report	Davis (yellow card) 12'; Lowe 64'; Kiwomya 80'	Stadium: Broadhall Way; Attendance: 2,544 (316 away); Referee: Kevin Johnson

13 August 2016 2	Notts County	1–1	Stevenage	Nottingham
15:00 BST	Stead 18'; O'Connor (yellow card) 62'; Duffy (yellow card) 77'; Hollis (yellow card) 83'	Report	Kennedy 9'; Tonge (yellow card) 23'	Stadium: Meadow Lane; Attendance: 3,987 (192 away); Referee: Robert Jones

16 August 2016 3	Leyton Orient	3–0	Stevenage	Leyton
19:45 BST	Massey 20', 75'; Cox 37'	Report	Franks (yellow card) 7'; Godden (yellow card) 13'; Wilkinson (yellow card) 82'	Stadium: Brisbane Road; Attendance: 3,779 (304 away); Referee: Brett Huxtable

20 August 2016 4	Stevenage	2–1	Luton Town	Stevenage
15:00 BST	Hunte 53'; Wells (yellow card) 60'; Wilkinson (yellow card) 85'; Godden 90+6'	Report	McGeehan 15'; Hylton (yellow card) 38'; Lee (yellow card) 66'	Stadium: Broadhall Way; Attendance: 3,517 (1,674 away); Referee: Andy Haines

27 August 2016 5	Grimsby Town	5–2	Stevenage	Cleethorpes
15:00 BST	Bogle 15', 50', 90+4'; Summerfield 40'; Vose 49'; Andrew (yellow card) 73'	Report	Franks 45+2'; McAnuff 66'; Kennedy (yellow card) 75'	Stadium: Blundell Park

3 September 2016 6	Stevenage	6–1	Hartlepool United	Stevenage
15:00 BST	Pett 27'; Ntlhe (yellow card) 34'; Walker 44', 57'; Wells 53'; Tonge 69' (pen.); Godden 78'	Report	Thomas 4'; Richards (yellow card) 43'; Harrison (yellow card) 83'	Stadium: Broadhall Way

10 September 2016 7	Stevenage	2–1	Crawley Town	Stevenage
15:00 BST	Walker 44' (yellow card) 76'; King 55' (yellow card) 73'; Pett (yellow card) 64'	Report	Collins 86' (yellow card) 88'; Payne (yellow card) 90'	Stadium: The Lamex Stadium; Attendance: 2,157 (212 away); Referee: Trevor Kettle

17 September 2016 8	Wycombe Wanderers	1–0	Stevenage	High Wycombe
15:00 BST	Gape (yellow card) 14'; Southwell 45+3'; Cowan-Hall (yellow card) 82'	Report	Tonge (yellow card) 34'; Franks (yellow card) 52'	Stadium: Adams Park; Attendance: 3,181 (292 away); Referee: Brendan Malone

24 September 2016 9	Stevenage	0–2	Exeter City	Stevenage
15:00 BST	McAnuff (yellow card) 54'; Kennedy (yellow card) 61'	Report	Moore-Taylor (red card) 24'; Taylor (yellow card) 45'; Reid (yellow card) 53'; Holmes 70'; Watkins 71'; Simpson (yellow card) 85'	Stadium: The Lamex Stadium; Attendance: 2,244; Referee: Ollie Yates

27 September 2016 10	Cheltenham Town	0–0	Stevenage	Cheltenham
19:45 BST	Dickie (yellow card) 34'; Wright (yellow card) 36'; Waters (yellow card) 90+2'	Report	King (yellow card) 76'; Gorman (yellow card) 78'	Stadium: LCI Rail Stadium; Attendance: 2,238; Referee: Robert Jones

8 October 2016 11	Stevenage	1–2	Plymouth Argyle	Stevenage
15:00 BST	Godden (yellow card) 29'; Henry (yellow card) 46'; Bradley 54' (o.g.); Cowans (yellow card) 69'; Franks (yellow card) 78'	Report	Bradley 47', 58'; Spencer (yellow card) 50'; Purrington (yellow card) 69'; Jervis (yellow card) 85'	Stadium: The Lamex Stadium; Attendance: 2,881; Referee: Ross Joyce

15 October 2016 12	Morecambe	0–2	Stevenage	Morecambe
15:00 BST	Whitmore (yellow card) 61'; Mullin (penalty missed) 88'; Murphy (yellow card) 90+5'	Report	Godden 36'; Cowans (yellow card) 43'; Kennedy 57'; Henry (yellow card) 88'	Stadium: Globe Arena; Attendance: 1,212; Referee: Richard Clark

22 October 2016 13	Stevenage	1–2	Carlisle United	Stevenage
15:00 BST	Jones (yellow card) 17'; Godden 44' (pen.); Ntlhe (yellow card) 69'; Kennedy (yellow card) 71'; McKirdy (yellow card) 90'	Report	Kennedy 16' (yellow card) 31'; Grainger (yellow card) 39' (goal) 57' (pen.); Miller (yellow card) 43'; Adams (yellow card) 45+3'; Gillespie (yellow card) 90+1'; Brisley (yellow card) 90+7'	Stadium: The Lamex Stadium; Attendance: 2,720; Referee: Nick Kinseley

29 October 2016 14	Mansfield Town	1–2	Stevenage	Mansfield
15:00 BST	Hoban 54'; Pearce (yellow card) 90+1'	Report	Lee 32'; Wilkinson (yellow card) 35'; Gorman (yellow card) 45+4'; McKirdy 57' (yellow card) 66'; Henry (yellow card) 70'; Jones (yellow card) 74'; Kennedy (yellow card) 80'	Stadium: One Call Stadium; Attendance: 2,716; Referee: Mark Heywood

12 November 2016 15	Stevenage	2–2	Yeovil Town	Stevenage
15:00 GMT	Cowans (yellow card) 31'; Lee (yellow card) 43'; Kennedy 68', 86'; King (yellow card) 84'	Report	Smith (yellow card) 32'; Hedges 48'; Whitfield 90+5'	Stadium: The Lamex Stadium; Attendance: 2,457; Referee: Gavin Ward

19 November 2016 16	Accrington Stanley	0–1	Stevenage	Accrington
15:00 GMT	Pearson (yellow card) 55'; McConville (yellow card) 72'; Vyner (yellow card) 81'	Report	Godden (yellow card) 55' (goal) 71'; Schumacher (yellow card) 61'; McAnuff (yellow card) 90+5'	Stadium: Wham Stadium; Attendance: 1,283; Referee: Michael Salisbury

26 November 2016 17	Portsmouth	1–2	Stevenage	Portsmouth
15:00 GMT	Clarke (yellow card) 73'; Smith 80'; Evans (yellow card) 90+1'	Report	Gorman (yellow card) 39'; Wilkinson (yellow card) 45'; Schumacher 71'; Godden 75'; King (yellow card) 90+4'	Stadium: Fratton Park; Attendance: 15,987; Referee: Ben Toner

3 December 2016 18	Stevenage	3–4	Doncaster Rovers	Stevenage
15:00 GMT	McKirdy (yellow card) 22'; Lee (yellow card) 41'; Gorman (yellow card) 44'; Pett 61'; Franks 72'; Liburd 90'	Report	Marquis (yellow card) 12'; Butler 28'; Mandeville 35'; Blair 39'; Jones 73' (o.g.)	Stadium: The Lamex Stadium; Attendance: 2,705; Referee: Lee Collins

6 December 2016 19	Newport County	0–2	Stevenage	Newport
19:45 GMT	Bennett (yellow card) 60'	Report	Jones 9' (o.g.); Pett 39'; Franks (yellow card) 50'; King (yellow card) 63'; Wilkinson (yellow card) 76'	Stadium: Rodney Parade; Attendance: 1,877; Referee: Kevin Johnson

10 December 2016 20	Stevenage	0–2	Blackpool	Stevenage
15:00 GMT	Pett (yellow card) 64'; Schumacher (yellow card) 83'	Report	Aldred (yellow card) 38'; Philliskirk (yellow card) 51'; Osayi-Samuel 77'; Cullen 84'	Stadium: The Lamex Stadium; Attendance: 2,513; Referee: John Brooks

17 December 2016 21	Barnet	1–2	Stevenage	Canons Park, London
15:00 GMT	Akinde 47' (pen.) (yellow card) 69'; Taylor (yellow card) 72'; Dembélé (yellow card) 78'; Nelson (yellow card) 84'	Report	Gorman 38' (yellow card) 75'; King (yellow card) 45'; Wilkinson 61'	Stadium: The Hive Stadium; Attendance: 3,228; Referee: Lee Swabey

26 December 2016 22	Stevenage	1–2	Cambridge United	Stevenage
15:00 GMT	Kennedy 46'; Wilkinson (yellow card) 58'; King (yellow card) 74'	Report	Roberts (yellow card) 14'; Legge 21'; Mingoia 82'	Stadium: The Lamex Stadium; Attendance: 3,957; Referee: Dean Whitestone

31 December 2016 23	Stevenage	2–4	Colchester United	Stevenage
15:00 GMT	Kennedy 40' (yellow card) 86'; Wilkinson (yellow card) 45+2'; Godden 51'; King (yellow card) 67'	Report	Dickenson 15'; Guthrie 19' (pen.); Brindley (yellow card) 81'; Porter 81'; Fosu 90+1' (yellow card) 90+2'	Stadium: The Lamex Stadium; Attendance: 3,076; Referee: Graham Horwood

2 January 2017 24	Doncaster Rovers	1–0	Stevenage	Doncaster
15:00 GMT	Franks 85' (o.g.)	Report	Pett (yellow card) 20'; King (yellow card) 88'	Stadium: Keepmoat Stadium; Attendance: 5,604; Referee: Mark Brown

7 January 2017 25	Stevenage	3–1	Newport County	Stevenage
15:00 GMT	Godden 9', 42', 62' (pen.)	Report	Bennett (yellow card) 33'; Nelson (yellow card) 61'; Butler 89'	Stadium: The Lamex Stadium; Attendance: 2,185; Referee: Rob Lewis

14 January 2017 26	Plymouth Argyle	4–2	Stevenage	Plymouth
15:00 GMT	Slew 35'; Jervis 42'; Garita 54'; Goodwillie 90+2'	Report	Godden 2'; Schumacher 45+2'; Loft (yellow card) 65'	Stadium: Home Park; Attendance: 8,137; Referee: Jack Busby

21 January 2017 27	Hartlepool United	2–0	Stevenage	Hartlepool
15:00 GMT	Oates (penalty missed) 41' (yellow card) 61'; Featherstone 41'; Walker 45+1'	Report	Tonge (yellow card) 86'; Lee (yellow card) 87'	Stadium: The Northern Gas and Power Stadium; Attendance: 3,363; Referee: David Webb

28 January 2017 28	Stevenage	2–0	Grimsby Town	Stevenage
15:00 GMT	Schumacher 4'; McAnuff 61'; Wilkinson (yellow card) 68'; McQuoid (yellow card) 82'	Report	Bogle (yellow card) 60'	Stadium: Broadhall Way; Attendance: 3,394; Referee: Brett Huxtable

4 February 2017 29	Crawley Town	1–2	Stevenage	Crawley
15:00 GMT	Collins 28' (pen.) (yellow card) 89'; Yorwerth (yellow card) 45'	Report	Godden 76', 90+5'; Lee (yellow card) 81'; Franks (yellow card) 90+6'	Stadium: Broadfield Stadium; Attendance: 2,124; Referee: Lee Swabey

11 February 2017 30	Stevenage	3–0	Wycombe Wanderers	Stevenage
15:00 GMT	Schumacher 25'; Godden 45+1' (pen.); Pett 49'; McAnuff (yellow card) 73'; Loft (yellow card) 82'	Report	Jacobson (yellow card) 42'	Stadium: The Lamex Stadium; Attendance: 2,602; Referee: Dean Whitestone

14 February 2017 31	Stevenage	2–1	Cheltenham Town	Stevenage
19:45 GMT	Godden 18' (pen.) (yellow card) 27'; Lee (yellow card) 44' (yellow-red card) 56'; Wilkinson 50'; Kennedy (yellow card) 63'; Jones (yellow card) 82'	Report	Cranston (yellow card) 19'; Boyle (yellow card) 50'; Pell (yellow card) 82'; Wootton 82'	Stadium: Lamex Stadium; Attendance: 1,930; Referee: Trevor Kettle

18 February 2017 32	Exeter City	1–1	Stevenage	Exeter
15:00 GMT	Reid 52'	Report	McAnuff 31' (yellow card) 90+4'; Franks (yellow card) 36'	Stadium: St James Park; Attendance: 4,125; Referee: Darren Handley

25 February 2017 33	Crewe Alexandra	1–2	Stevenage	Crewe
15:00 GMT	Dagnall (red card) 24'; Jones 71' (pen.); Nugent (yellow card) 90+2'	Report	Godden 7'; Jones (red card) 25'; Franks 36'; Lee (yellow card) 59'	Stadium: Gresty Road; Attendance: 3,547; Referee: Darren England

28 February 2017 34	Stevenage	4–1	Leyton Orient	Stevenage
19:45 GMT	Kennedy 18'; Godden 22' (pen.); Wilkinson 48'; Pett 62'	Report	Hunt (yellow card) 22'; McCallum 24'; Massey (yellow card) 31'	Stadium: Broadhall Way; Attendance: 2,908; Referee: Charles Breakspear

4 March 2017 35	Stevenage	3–0	Notts County	Stevenage
15:00 GMT	Godden 3', 62'; King 60'	Report	Clackstone (yellow card) 59'	Stadium: Broadhall Way; Attendance: 3,248; Referee: David Webb

11 March 2017 36	Luton Town	0-2	Stevenage	Luton
15:00 GMT		Report	Wilkinson 3'; Pett (yellow card) 8'; King (yellow card) 41'; Kennedy 85' (yellow card) 86'; McAnuff (yellow card) 90+3'	Stadium: Kenilworth Road; Attendance: 9,045; Referee: Brendan Malone

14 March 2017 37	Blackpool	1–0	Stevenage	Blackpool
19:45 GMT	Cullen 15' (pen.); Payne (yellow card) 83'; Daniel (yellow card) 89'; Delfouneso (yellow card) 90+4'	Report	Franks (yellow card) 62'; Pett (yellow card) 88'; Wilkinson (yellow card) 90+5'	Stadium: Bloomfield Road; Attendance: 2,456; Referee: Ross Joyce

18 March 2017 38	Stevenage	3–0	Portsmouth	Stevenage
15:00 GMT	King 16'; Godden 28'; Wilkinson (yellow card) 34'; Pett (yellow card) 45'; McAnuff 46'; Gorman (yellow card) 85'; Franks (yellow card) 86'	Report	Stevens (yellow card) 27'; Burgess (yellow card) 31' (yellow-red card) 75'; Baker (yellow card) 54'	Stadium: Broadhall Way; Attendance: 4,185; Referee: Michael Salisbury

25 March 2017 39	Cambridge United	0–0	Stevenage	Cambridge
15:00 GMT		Report	Schumacher (yellow card) 67'	Stadium: Abbey Stadium; Attendance: 5,520; Referee: Mark Haywood

1 April 2017 40	Stevenage	1–0	Barnet	Stevenage
15:00 GMT	Pett 7'	Report	Akinde (yellow card) 68'	Stadium: Broadhall Way; Attendance: 3,657; Referee: Mark Heywood

8 April 2017 41	Colchester United	4–0	Stevenage	Colchester
15:00 BST	Dickenson 12'; Porter 30'; McQuoid 34' (o.g.); Lee 39' (o.g.)	Report	King (yellow card) 45+3'	Stadium: Colchester Community Stadium; Attendance: 3,583; Referee: Chris Sarginson

14 April 2017 42	Stevenage	0–1	Morecambe	Stevenage
15:00 BST		Report	Molyneux 68'	Stadium: Broadhall Way; Attendance: 3,117; Referee: Darren Deadman

17 April 2017 43	Carlisle United	1–1	Stevenage	Carlisle
15:00 BST	Joyce (yellow card) 66'; Ibehre 72' (yellow card) 90+5'	Report	Gorman (yellow card) 32'; Ogilvie (yellow card) 37'; Schumacher (yellow card) 40' (goal) 50' (pen.); Franks (yellow card) 63'; Wells (yellow card) 90+4'	Stadium: Brunton Park; Attendance: 4,572; Referee: Ben Toner

22 April 2017 44	Stevenage	0–1	Mansfield Town	Stevenage
15:00 BST	Lee (yellow card) 57'; Gorman (yellow card) 63'; McAnuff (yellow card) 90+1'	Report	Rose 44'; White (yellow card) 51'	Stadium: Broadhall Way; Attendance: 2,765; Referee: Graham Salisbury

29 April 2017 45	Yeovil Town	1–1	Stevenage	Yeovil
15:00 BST	Akpa Akpro 44'	Report	McQuoid 53'	Stadium: Huish Park; Attendance: 3,716; Referee: Graham Horwood

6 May 2017 46	Stevenage	0–3	Accrington Stanley	Stevenage
17:30 BST	Wells (yellow card) 40'; McAnuff (yellow card) 65'	Report	Pearson (yellow card) 62'; Kee 72' (pen.), 79'; McConville (yellow card) 81'; Conneely 90+4' (pen.)	Stadium: Broadhall Way; Attendance: 3,517; Referee: Geoff Eltringham

=== FA Cup ===
5 November 2016 First round	Port Vale	1–0	Stevenage	Stoke-on-Trent
15:00 GMT	Streete 38'; Smith (yellow card) 47'; Grant (yellow card) 49'	Report	Gorman (yellow card) 30'; Cowans (yellow card) 43'	Stadium: Vale Park; Attendance: 3,093; Referee: Mark Haywood

=== EFL Cup ===
9 August 2016 First round	Ipswich Town	0–1	Stevenage	Ipswich
19:45 BST	Smith (yellow card) 51'	Report	Kennedy 53'; Lee (yellow card) 77'; Henry (yellow card) 81'	Stadium: Portman Road; Attendance: 6,858 (245 away); Referee: Charles Breakspear

23 August 2016 Second round	Stevenage	0–4	Stoke City	Stevenage
19:45 BST	Lee (yellow card) 43'; Franks (yellow card) 81'	Report	Crouch 14', 48', 70'; Cameron (yellow card) 30'; Bardsley 32'	Stadium: Broadhall Way; Attendance: 3,363 (854 away); Referee: Oliver Langford

=== EFL Trophy ===
Pos	Div	Team	Pld	W	PW	PL	L	GF	GA	GD	Pts	Qualification
1	L1	Southend United	3	2	0	0	1	3	4	−1	6	Advance to Round 2
2	ACA	Brighton & Hove Albion U21	3	1	1	0	1	3	4	−1	5	Advance to Round 2
3	L2	Stevenage	3	1	0	1	1	7	5	+2	4	
4	L2	Leyton Orient	3	1	0	0	2	3	3	0	3	

Source: Sky Sports

30 August 2016 Group stage 1	Leyton Orient	3–1	Stevenage	Leyton
19:45 BST	McCallum 33', 70'; Kelly (yellow card) 46'; Semedo 54'		Wells (red card) 13'; Franks 58' (yellow card) 90'	Stadium: Brisbane Road

4 October 2016 Group stage 2	Stevenage	2–2 (3–4 p)	Brighton & Hove Albion U23	Stevenage
19:45 BST	Walker 60'; McKirdy 87'	Report	Ince 1'; Starkey 83'; Goldson (yellow card) 88'	Stadium: The Lamex Stadium; Attendance: 486; Referee: Nick Kinseley
	Penalties
	Tonge (penalty scored); Cowans (penalty missed); Fox (penalty scored); Hunte (penalty missed); Gorman (penalty scored)		Hünemeier (penalty missed); Goldson (penalty scored); Tilley (penalty scored); Pocognoli (penalty scored); Collar (penalty scored)

8 November 2016 Group stage 3	Stevenage	4–0	Southend United	Stevenage
19:45 GMT	Schumacher 8'; Godden 18'; Liburd 64', 90+1'; Gorman (yellow card) 78'	Report	Thompson (yellow card) 7'	Stadium: The Lamex Stadium; Attendance: 559; Referee: Graham Horwood
