= 2015–16 Stevenage F.C. season =

Stevenage
2015–16 season
- Chairman: Phil Wallace
- Manager: Teddy Sheringham (until 1 February); Darren Sarll (from 1 February)
- League Two: 18th
- FA Cup: First Round
- League Cup: First Round
- Football League Trophy: Second Round
- Top goalscorer: League: Chris Whelpdale (8); All: Chris Whelpdale (9)
Home colours	Away colours

The 2015–16 season was Stevenage's second consecutive season in League Two and their 40th year in existence. Along with competing in League Two, the club also participated in the FA Cup, League Cup and Football League Trophy. The season covers the period from 1 July 2015 to 30 June 2016.

== Transfers ==
=== Transfers in ===
Date from	Position	Nationality	Name	From	Fee	Ref.
1 July 2015	CB	ENG	Mark Hughes	Morecambe	Free transfer	
1 July 2015	CM	ENG	Steven Schumacher	Fleetwood Town	Free transfer	
1 July 2015	CF	ENG	Brett Williams	Aldershot Town	Free transfer	
17 July 2015	CB	ENG	Fraser Franks	Luton Town	Free transfer	
7 August 2015	CB	ENG	Jamie McCombe	Doncaster Rovers	Free transfer	
1 September 2015	CM	ENG	Jack Jebb	Arsenal	Free transfer	
22 January 2016	CB	ENG	Luke Wilkinson	Luton Town	Unknown	

=== Transfers out ===
Date from	Position	Nationality	Name	To	Fee	Ref.
1 July 2015	DF	ENG	George Allen	Free Agent	Released	
1 July 2015	CB	ENG	Jon Ashton	Crawley Town (Note: Following Ashton's release he joined Crawley Town.)	Free transfer	
1 July 2015	CF	ENG	Chris Beardsley	Mansfield Town (Note: Following Beardsley's release he joined Mansfield Town.)	Free transfer	
1 July 2015	GK	ENG	Sam Beasant	Cambridge United (Note: Following Beasant's release he joined Cambridge United.)	Free transfer	
1 July 2015	AM	ENG	Andy Bond	Chorley (Note: Following Bond's release he joined Chorley.)	Released	
1 July 2015	CB	ENG	Darius Charles	Burton Albion	Free transfer	
1 July 2015	CF	ENG	Roarie Deacon	Crawley Town (Note: Following Deacon's release he joined Crawley Town.)	Free transfer	
1 July 2015	CB	FRA	Bira Dembélé	Barnet (Note: Following Dembélé's release he joined Barnet.)	Free transfer	
1 July 2015	RM	ENG	Joseph N'Guessan	Queens Park Rangers (Note: Following N'Guessan's release he joined Queens Park Rangers.)	Free transfer	
1 July 2015	CF	NGA	Fejiri Okenabirhie	Free Agent	Released	
1 July 2015	RB	ENG	Michael Richens	Free Agent	Released	
1 July 2015	CM	ENG	Simon Walton	Crawley Town (Note: Following Walton's release he joined Crawley Town.)	Free transfer	
1 July 2015	CB	ENG	Harry Worley	Hartlepool United (Note: Following Worley's release he joined Hartlepool United.)	Free transfer	
1 July 2015	CF	COD	Calvin Zola	Free Agent	Released	
7 August 2015	CF	ENG	Connor Calcutt	Wealdstone	Free transfer	

=== Loans in ===
Date from	Position	Nationality	Name	From	Date until	Ref.
7 August 2015	SS	ENG	Tom Hitchcock	Milton Keynes Dons	11 October 2015	(Note: On 11 September 2015, Hitchcock's loan was extended until 11 October 2015.)
14 August 2015	GK	SCO	Chris Kettings	Crystal Palace	12 September 2015	
14 August 2015	LB	ENG	Connor Ogilvie	Tottenham Hotspur	4 January 2016	(Note: On 14 September 2015, Ogilvie's loan was extended until 4 January 2016.)
27 August 2015	GK	FIN	Jesse Joronen	Fulham	10 January 2016	
1 September 2015	AM	IRL	Connor Smith	Watford	29 September 2015	
26 September 2015	RW	IRL	Kenny McEvoy	Tottenham Hotspur	24 October 2015	
14 January 2016	CM	IRL	Keith Keane	Cambridge United	20 February	
23 January 2016	R/LW	LTU	Deimantas Petravicius	Nottingham Forest	23 February 2016	
23 January 2016	ST	CGO	Offrande Zanzala	Derby County	23 February 2016	
12 March 2016	FW	ENG	Greg Luer	Hull City	12 April 2016	

== Competitions ==
=== Pre-season friendlies ===
On 29 May 2015, Stevenage announced three home pre-season friendlies against Nottingham Forest, Millwall and Tottenham Hotspur XI. On 16 June 2015, Stevenage confirmed a XI squad will face St Neots Town. Also a friendly fixture against Spanish side Sevilla B was announced.

11 July 2015 Friendly	Wealdstone	0–1	Stevenage	Ruislip
15:00 BST		Report	Williams 31' (pen.)	Stadium: The Vale Stadium

14 July 2015 Friendly	St Neots Town	0–2	Stevenage XI	St Neots
19:45 BST		Report	Akinyemi 15', 20'	Stadium: Rowley Park; Attendance: 415

17 July 2015 Friendly	Stevenage	0–3	Nottingham Forest	Stevenage
19:30 BST		Report	Mills 13'; Lansbury 20' (pen.); Hobbs 88'	Stadium: Broadhall Way; Referee: Andy Woolmer

25 July 2015 Friendly	Stevenage	0–1	Millwall	Stevenage
15:00 BST		Report	Beevers 61'	Stadium: Broadhall Way; Referee: Graham Horwood

1 August 2015 Friendly	Stevenage	0–2	Tottenham Hotspur XI	Stevenage
15:00 BST		Report	Oduwa 6'; Harrison 88' (pen.)	Stadium: Broadhall Way

=== League Two ===
==== League table ====
Pos	Team	Pld	W	D	L	GF	GA	GD	Pts
16	Hartlepool United	46	15	6	25	49	72	−23	51
17	Notts County	46	14	9	23	54	83	−29	51
18	Stevenage	46	11	15	20	52	67	−15	48
19	Yeovil Town	46	11	15	20	43	59	−16	48
20	Crawley Town	46	13	8	25	45	78	−33	47

Updated to match(es) played on 7 May 2016. Source: BBC Sport
Rules for classification: 1) Points; 2) Goal difference; 3) Number of goals scored

==== Matches ====
On 17 June 2015, the fixtures for the forthcoming season were announced.

===== August =====
8 August 2015 1	Stevenage	0–2	Notts County	Stevenage
15:00 BST	Schumacher (yellow card) 60'; Hitchcock (red card) 90+4'	Report	Opoku Aborah (yellow card) 6'; Thompson 35', (yellow card) 69'; Jenner (yellow card) 88'; Amevor 88', (red card) 90+4'; Noble (yellow card) 89'	Stadium: Broadhall Way; Attendance: 3,652; Referee: Graham Salisbury

15 August 2015 2	Newport County	2–2	Stevenage	Newport
15:00 BST	Collins 58'; Boden 79'	Report	Akinyemi 39'; Hughes 90'	Stadium: Rodney Parade; Attendance: 2,521; Referee: Nick Kinseley

18 August 2015 3	Leyton Orient	3–0	Stevenage	Leyton
19:45 BST	Simpson 74'; Turgott 84'; Palmer 90'	Report		Stadium: Brisbane Road; Attendance: 4,949; Referee: Chris Sarginson

22 August 2015 4	Stevenage	2–0	Hartlepool United	Stevenage
15:00 BST	Franks 45'; Williams 88'	Report		Stadium: Broadhall Way; Attendance: 2,639; Referee: Charles Breakspear

29 August 2015 5	Dagenham & Redbridge	1–1	Stevenage	Dagenham
15:00 BST	Hemmings 29'	Report	Hitchcock 74'	Stadium: Victoria Road; Attendance: 1,653; Referee: Tim Robinson

===== September =====
5 September 2015 6	Stevenage	2–1	Plymouth Argyle	Stevenage
15:00 BST	Ogilvie 6'; Whelpdale 38'	Report	Tanner 54'	Stadium: Broadhall Way; Attendance: 3,560; Referee: Gary Sutton

12 September 2015 7	Stevenage	2–2	York City	Stevenage
15:00 BST	Whelpdale 52'; Lee 55'	Report	Nolan 39'; Summerfield 74'	Stadium: Broadhall Way; Attendance: 3,319; Referee: Brendan Malone

19 September 2015 8	Barnet	3–2	Stevenage	Canons Park
15:00 BST	N'Gala 48'; McLean 63'; Gash 78'	Report	Franks 11'; Hitchcock 50'	Stadium: The Hive Stadium; Attendance: 2,480; Referee: James Adcock

26 September 2015 9	Cambridge United	1–0	Stevenage	Cambridge
15:00 BST	Dunk 90+7'	Report	Hitchcock (yellow card) 59'; Lee (yellow card) 72'	Stadium: Abbey Stadium; Attendance: 4,582 (away 573); Referee: Ross Joyce

29 September 2015 10	Stevenage	0–2	Mansfield Town	Stevenage
19:45 BST		Report	Tafazolli 47'; J Thomas 51'	Stadium: Broadhall Way; Attendance: 2,509; Referee: Lee Swabey

===== October =====
3 October 2015 11	Stevenage	0–1	Carlisle United	Stevenage
15:00 BST	Conlon (yellow card) 48'	Report	Miller 82'	Stadium: Broadhall Way; Attendance: 2,999; Referee: Andy Davies

11 October 2015 12	Exeter City	3–3	Stevenage	Exeter
12:15 BST	Wheeler 4', 80'; Morrison 15'; Noble (yellow card) 90'	Report	Parrett 39'; Kennedy 15'; Whelpdale 90+2'	Stadium: St James Park; Attendance: 3,235; Referee: Roger East

17 October 2015 13	Stevenage	2–1	Wycombe Wanderers	Stevenage
15:00 BST	Hughes (yellow card) 8'; Joronen 10'; Whelpdale (yellow card) 21'; Schumacher (yellow card) 30'; Gnanduillet 60', (yellow card) 89'; Parrett (yellow card) 73'	Report	Bean (yellow card) 59'; Kretzschmar 79'; Pierre (yellow card) 89'	Stadium: Broadhall Way; Attendance: 3,292; Referee: Ben Toner

20 October 2015 14	Portsmouth	1–1	Stevenage	Portsmouth
19:45 BST	Chaplin 77'	Report	Tonge (yellow card) 69'; Williams 90+4'	Stadium: Fratton Park; Attendance: 14,900; Referee: Andy Woolmer

24 October 2015 15	Northampton Town	2–1	Stevenage	Northampton
15:00 BST	Calvert-Lewin 49'; Potter 62'	Report	Schumacher 24'; Tonge (yellow card) 59'; Conlon (yellow card) 76'; McCombe (yellow card) 86'; Williams (yellow card) 90+5'	Stadium: Sixfields Stadium; Attendance: 4,492; Referee: Geoff Eltringham

31 October 2015 16	Stevenage	1–5	Oxford United	Stevenage
15:00 GMT	Whelpdale 17'; McCombe (red card) 27'; Tonge (red card) 67'	Report	Taylor 13', 72'; Sercombe 27' (pen.); McDonald (yellow card) 44', (goal) 66'; Dunkley (yellow card) 45+5'; Roofe 75'	Stadium: Broadhall Way; Attendance: 3,412; Referee: Lee Swabey

===== November =====
14 November 2015 17	Yeovil Town	2–2	Stevenage	Stevenage
15:00 GMT	Cornick 52'; Jeffers 58'; Fogden (yellow card) 90+6'	Report	Parrett (yellow card) 44'; Wells 55'; Ogilvie (yellow card) 86'; Pett 88'; Schumacher (yellow card) 90+3'	Stadium: Broadhall Way; Attendance: 3,220; Referee: Phil Gibbs

21 November 2015 18	Stevenage	0–0	Luton Town	Stevenage
15:00 GMT	Lee (yellow card) 57'; Benson (red card) 87'	Report	Wells (yellow card) 76'; Conlon (yellow card) 90'	Stadium: Broadhall Way; Attendance: 4,782; Referee: Robert Lewis

24 November 2015 19	Bristol Rovers	1–2	Stevenage	Horfield
19:45 GMT	Taylor 33'	Report	Schumacher 4'; Whelpdale 60'; Lee (yellow card) 80'; Franks (yellow card) 90+2'	Stadium: Memorial Stadium (Bristol); Attendance: 5,819; Referee: Graham Salisbury

28 November 2015 20	Stevenage	4–3	Morecambe	Stevenage
15:00 GMT	Wells 7'; Whelpdale 20', 49', 61'; Pett (yellow card) 86'	Report	Ellison 13', 90+4'; Goodall (yellow card) 27'; Beeley (yellow card) 46'; Murphy (yellow card) 64'; Mullin 82' (pen.)	Stadium: Broadhall Way; Attendance: 2,415; Referee: Lee Collins

===== December =====
12 December 2015 21	Wimbledon	1–2	Stevenage	Kingston upon Thames
15:00 GMT	Osborne (yellow card) 14'; Francomb 43'	Report	Matt 57'; Okimo 76'	Stadium: Kingsmeadow; Attendance: 3,846; Referee: Nick Kinseley

19 December 2015 22	Stevenage	1–1	Accrington Stanley	Stevenage
15:00 GMT	Gnanduillet 1'	Report	Halliday (yellow card) 53'; Davies (yellow card) 81'; Kee 85' (pen.)	Stadium: Broadhall Way; Attendance: 2,818; Referee: Darren England

26 December 2015 23	Crawley Town	2–1	Stevenage	Crawley
15:00 GMT	Edwards 68'; Walton (yellow card) 81'; Yorwerth (yellow card) 86'; Deacon 90', (yellow card) 90+6'	Report	Tonge 87' (pen.)	Stadium: Broadfield Stadium; Attendance: 2,289; Referee: Michael Bull

28 December 2015 24	Stevenage	1–3	Dagenham & Redbridge	Stevenage
15:00 GMT	Franks 52'	Report	Chambers 18'; Labadie 19' (yellow card) 83'; Doidge 37'	Stadium: Broadhall Way; Attendance: 3,152; Referee: Oliver Langford

===== January =====
2 January 2016 25	Stevenage	2–2	Leyton Orient	Stevenage
15:00 GMT	Franks (yellow card) 24'; Gnanduillet 75', 79'	Report	Simpson 60' (pen.), 90+3'; Pritchard (yellow card) 66'	Stadium: Broadhall Way; Attendance: 4,022; Referee: Darren Deadman

9 January 2016 26	Mansfield Town	2–1	Stevenage	Mansfield
15:00 GMT	Clements 42', (yellow card) 60'; Baxendale 65'	Report	Gnanduillet 90+5'	Stadium: Field Mill; Attendance: 3,126; Referee: David Webb

16 January 2016 27	Plymouth Argyle	3–2	Stevenage	Plymouth
15:00 GMT	McHugh 3'; Wylde 17'; Tanner 40', (yellow card) 77'	Report	Lee 6', 49'; Tonge (yellow card) 60'; Parrett (yellow card) 64'	Stadium: Home Park; Attendance: 9,546; Referee: James Linington

23 January 2016 28	Stevenage	0–0	Barnet	Stevenage
15:00 GMT	Lee (yellow card) 48'; Zanzala (yellow card) 56'; Keane (yellow card) 59'	Report	Champion (yellow card) 39'; Randall (yellow card) 63'	Stadium: Broadhall Way; Attendance: 3,801; Referee: Iain Williamson

30 January 2016 29	York City	2–1	Stevenage	York
15:00 GMT	McEvoy 15'; Galbraith 90+3'	Report	Keane 78'; O'Connor (yellow card) 83'	Stadium: Bootham Crescent; Attendance: 2,951; Referee: Jeremy Simpson

===== February =====
6 February 2016 30	Stevenage	0–1	Crawley Town	Stevenage
15:00 GMT	Wilkinson (yellow card) 85'; Zanzala (yellow card) 90+1'	Report	Harrold 44'; Yorwerth	Stadium: Broadhall Way; Attendance: 2,639; Referee: Gavin Ward

9 February 2016 31	Hartlepool United	1–2	Stevenage	Hartlepool
19:45 GMT	Magnay (yellow card) 42'; Paynter 68'; Thomas (yellow card) 76'	Report	Parrett (yellow card) 21'; Ogilvie (yellow card) 41'; Conlon 45', 52'; Lee (yellow card) 61'; Gorman (yellow card) 90'	Stadium: Victoria Park; Attendance: 3,308; Referee: Ben Toner

13 February 2016 32	Stevenage	2–0	Cambridge United	Stevenage
15:00 GMT	Harrison 18', 63'; Wilkinson (yellow card) 29'; Lee (yellow card) 50'; Conlon (yellow card) 58'; Ogilvie (yellow card) 64'; Jones (yellow card) 89'	Report	Norris (yellow card) 64'; Furlong (yellow card) 86'	Stadium: Broadhall Way; Attendance: 3,945; Referee: Chris Kavanagh

20 February 2016 33	Carlisle United	1–0	Stevenage	Carlisle
15:00 GMT	Ibehre 59'; Hope (yellow card) 73'	Report	Wilkinson (yellow card) 66'	Stadium: Brunton Park; Attendance: 4,780; Referee: Eddie Ilderton

27 February 2016 34	Stevenage	0–2	Exeter City	Stevenage
15:00 GMT	Conlon (yellow card) 49'	Report	Stockley 84', 90+7'	Stadium: Broadhall Way; Attendance: 2,812; Referee: Dean Whitestone

===== March =====
5 March 2016 35	Stevenage	0–2	Portsmouth	Stevenage
15:00 GMT	Wilkinson (yellow card) 38'	Report	McNulty 22', (yellow card) 23'; Naismith 82'	Stadium: Broadhall Way; Attendance: 4,092; Referee: Kevin Johnson

12 March 2016 36	Wycombe Wanderers	1–0	Stevenage	High Wycombe
15:00 GMT	O'Nien 70'	Report	Kennedy (yellow card) 67'; Tonge (yellow card) 90+5'	Stadium: Adams Park; Attendance: 3,715; Referee: Andy Woolmer

19 March 2016 37	Stevenage	2–3	Northampton Town	Stevenage
15:00 GMT	Wilkinson 11', 30'; Franks (red card) 79'	Report; Highlights	Collins 41'; O'Toole 51'; Holmes 90+5'	Stadium: Broadhall Way; Attendance: 3,902; Referee: David Webb

25 March 2016 38	Oxford United	1–1	Stevenage	Stevenage
15:00 GMT	Lundstram (red card) 16'; MacDonald (yellow card) 46'; Sercombe 58'	Report	Parrett (yellow card) 28'; Jones (yellow card) 45'; Harrison 69'; Pritchard (yellow card) 75'	Stadium: Broadhall Way; Attendance: 7,980; Referee: Brendan Malone

===== April =====
2 April 2016 39	Luton Town	0–1	Stevenage	Luton
15:00 BST	McCourt (yellow card) 16'	Report	Mulraney (yellow card) 48'; Tonge 85'	Stadium: Kenilworth Road; Attendance: 8,502; Referee: Darren Handley

5 April 2016 40	Stevenage	0–0	Yeovil Town	Stevenage
19:45 BST	Kennedy (yellow card) 84'; Tonge (yellow card) 89'	Report	Dolan (yellow card) 90+6'	Stadium: Broadhall Way; Attendance: 2,748; Referee: Nick Kinseley

9 April 2016 41	Notts County	1–0	Stevenage	Nottingham
15:00 BST	Audel (yellow card) 36'; Stead (yellow card) 53'; Noble 80'; Atkinson (yellow card) 88'	Report	Harrison (yellow card) 71'; Gorman (yellow card) 79'	Stadium: Meadow Lane; Attendance: 4,172; Referee: Mark Heywood

16 April 2016 42	Stevenage	2–1	Newport County	Stevenage
15:00 BST	Mulraney 9', (yellow card) 68'; Wilkinson (yellow card) 32'; O'Connor 33', (yellow card) 70'	Report	Holmes (yellow card) 29'; Jones (yellow card) 32'; Elito (yellow card) 58'; Rodman 87'	Stadium: Broadhall Way; Attendance: 2,673; Referee: Iain Williamson

19 April 2016 43	Stevenage	0–0	Bristol Rovers	Stevenage
15:00 BST	Tonge (yellow card) 59'; Franks (yellow card) 78'; Parrett (yellow card) 90'	Report	Clarke (yellow card) 57'	Stadium: Broadhall Way; Attendance: 3,836; Referee: Andy Madley

23 April 2016 44	Morecambe	1–4	Stevenage	Morecambe
15:00 BST	Stockton 20'; Wildig (yellow card) 57'; Devitt (yellow card) 90+4'	Report	Goodall 38' (o.g.); Parrett 45+1', 71'; Kennedy 86'	Stadium: Globe Arena; Attendance: 1,129; Referee: Oliver Langford

30 April 2016 45	Stevenage	0–0	Wimbledon	Stevenage
15:00 BST	Tonge (yellow card) 10'	Report	Robinson (yellow card) 48'	Stadium: Broadhall Way; Attendance: 4,011; Referee: Charles Breakspear

===== May =====
7 May 2016 46	Accrington Stanley	0–0	Stevenage	Accrington
15:00 BST		Report		Stadium: Crown Ground; Attendance: 4,386

=== FA Cup ===
7 November 2015 1st Round	Stevenage	3–0	Gillingham	Stevenage
15:00 GMT	Schumacher 13'; Whelpdale 29'; Henry (yellow card) 43'; Gnanduillet (yellow card) 43', (goal) 90+2'	Report	Dickenson (yellow card) 42'; Loft (yellow card) 65'; Donnelly (yellow card) 78'	Stadium: Broadhall Way; Attendance: 1,619; Referee: Trevor Kettle

5 December 2015 2nd Round	Yeovil Town	1–0	Stevenage	Yeovil
15:00 GMT	Dolan (yellow card) 12'; Tozer 86'	Report	Wells (yellow card) 77'	Stadium: Huish Park; Attendance: 2,264; Referee: Chris Sarginson

=== League Cup ===
On 16 June 2015, the first round draw was made, Stevenage were drawn away against Ipswich Town.

11 August 2015 First round	Ipswich Town	2–1	Stevenage	Ipswich
19:45 BST	Yorwerth 55'; Tabb 76'	Report	Berra 34' (o.g.)	Stadium: Portman Road; Attendance: 10,449; Referee: Fred Graham

=== Football League Trophy ===
On 5 September 2015, the second round draw was shown live on Soccer AM and drawn by Charlie Austin and Ed Skrein. Stevenage hosted Dagenham & Redbridge.

7 October 2015 Second round	Stevenage	1–2	Dagenham & Redbridge	Stevenage
19:45 BST	Parrett (yellow card) 42'; Kennedy 79' (pen.)	Report	Cureton 53', (yellow card) 80'; Chambers 55'; Obileye (yellow card) 79'	Stadium: Broadhall Way; Attendance: 1,401; Referee: James Linington
