= Rohdell Gordon =

English footballer (born 1989)

Personal information
- Full name: Rohdell Antonio Gordon
- Date of birth: 28 March 1996 (age 30)
- Place of birth: Wandsworth, London, England
- Height: 1.79 m (5 ft 10 in)
- Position: Midfielder

Team information
- Current team: Westfield

Youth career
- 2010–2013: Stevenage

Senior career*
Years	Team	Apps	(Gls)
2012–2016	Stevenage	7	(0)
2012	→ Walton Casuals (loan)	1	(0)
2013–2014	→ Arlesey Town (loan)	4	(0)
2014	→ Bishop's Stortford (loan)	1	(0)
2014–2015	→ Chelmsford City (loan)	28	(5)
2016	→ Bromley (loan)	15	(1)
2016	Braintree Town	5	(0)
2016	Bishop's Stortford	2	(0)
2016–2017	Hemel Hempstead Town	12	(1)
2017	Hayes & Yeading United	11	(2)
2017–2018	Ashford United	8	(0)
2018–2019	Royston Town	42	(9)
2019	→ Kings Langley (loan)	6	(0)
2019–2020	Walton Casuals	26	(4)
2020	St Albans City	6	(0)
2020–2021	Braintree Town	9	(0)
2021–2022	Walton Casuals	37	(6)
2022–2023	Hendon	42	(3)
2023	Whitehawk	0	(0)
2023	Potters Bar Town	10	(0)
2023–2024	Margate	18	(0)
2024	Biggleswade Town	13	(1)
2024–2025	Bowers & Pitsea	28	(2)
2025	Hendon	12	(0)
2025	Sittingbourne	0	(0)
2025–2026	Hendon	40	(1)
2026–	Westfield	2	(1)
- * Club domestic league appearances and goals as of 19:36, 4 November 2026 (UTC)

Rohdell Antonio Gordon (born 28 March 1989) is an English footballer who plays as a midfielder for Isthmian League South Central Division club Westfield.

== Career ==
Gordon was born in the London Borough of Wandsworth and represented South London as a schoolboy, playing alongside Jordon Ibe. Gordon joined the youth system at Stevenage in 2010 as an under-15 player after impressing in an open trial. In the summer of 2012, Gordon started a two-year scholarship with the club. On his return to Stevenage in April 2014, Gordon was handed his professional debut in a 1–0 defeat to Sheffield United, replacing Lucas Akins as a substitute. In May 2014, after making three first team appearances, Gordon was handed his first professional contract on a one-year deal. Gordon made two further League One appearances for the club, against Bristol City and Walsall respectively. In the ensuing 2015–16 season, Gordon made 4 League Two appearances for Stevenage, making his debut in the fourth against Hartlepool United.

He gained his first taste of senior football on loan at Isthmian Division One South side Walton Casuals. He made a single appearance for the club in December 2012.

In November 2013, Gordon joined Southern Football League Premier Division side Arlesey Town on work experience. He made his debut in a 2–1 defeat to Weymouth. Gordon returned to Stevenage in January 2014, having made six appearances for the club.

In March 2010, he joined Conference South side Bishop's Stortford on loan. He made his only appearance for the club came as a substitute in the 2–1 defeat to Gosport Borough.

In August 2014 he joined Chelmsford City on a loan until the end of the year, making his debut in a 0–0 draw against Bath City two days later. In January 2015, Gordon extended his loan deal until the end of the season with Chelmsford City.

On 13 February 2016, Gordon joined Bromley on loan, and made his first appearance for the Ravens on the same day, in a 2–0 defeat to Wrexham. He scored his first goal for the club on 1 March, in a 2–0 win over Welling United.

In July 2016, he joined National League side Braintree Town on a free transfer following his release from Stevenage.

After leaving Hendon at the end of the 2022-2023 season, Gordon signed for Isthmian Premier side Whitehawk but left before the start of the new season without making an appearance. Following his surprise departure, he joined Potters Bar Town. In October 2023, he joined Margate.

In February 2025, Gordon returned to Hendon. In June 2025, he joined Isthmian League South East Division side Sittingbourne.

On 14 June 2026, Gordon agreed to join Westfield after returning to Hendon during the 2025–26 season, despite having left the club at the end of the previous campaign to join Sittingbourne.

== Career statistics ==
As of 15 August 2026

Appearances and goals by club, season and competition
Club	Season	League			FA Cup		League Cup		Other		Total	
Club	Season	Division	Apps	Goals	Apps	Goals	Apps	Goals	Apps	Goals	Apps	Goals
Stevenage	2012–13	League One	0	0	0	0	0	0	0	0	0	0
Stevenage	2013–14	League One	3	0	0	0	0	0	0	0	3	0
Stevenage	2014–15	League Two	0	0	0	0	0	0	0	0	0	0
Stevenage	2015–16	League Two	4	0	0	0	0	0	0	0	4	0
Stevenage	Total		7	0	0	0	0	0	0	0	7	0
Walton Casuals (loan)	2012–13	Isthmian League Division One South	1	0	—		—		0	0	1	0
Arlesey Town (loan)	2013–14	Southern League Premier Division	4	0	—		—		1 (Note: Appearances in the FA Trophy)	0	5	0
Bishop's Stortford (loan)	2013–14	Conference South	1	0	—		—		—		1	0
Chelmsford City (loan)	2014–15	Conference South	28	5	4	0	—		1	0	33	5
Bromley (loan)	2015–16	National League	15	1	—		—		—		15	1
Braintree Town	2016–17	National League	5	0	0	0	—		0	0	5	0
Bishop's Stortford	2016–17	National League South	2	0	—		—		0	0	2	0
Hemel Hempstead Town	2016–17	National League South	12	1	—		—		0	0	12	1
Hayes & Yeading United	2017–18	Southern League East Division	11	2	6	1	—		2	0	19	3
Ashford United	2017–18	Isthmian League South Division	8	0	—		—		—		8	0
Royston Town	2017–18	Southern League Premier Division	14	4	—		—		—		14	4
Royston Town	2018–19	Southern League Premier Division Central	28	5	1	0	—		5 (Note: One appearance and one goal in Southern League Cup, four appearances in FA Trophy)	1	34	6
Royston Town	Total		42	9	1	0	—		5	1	48	10
Kings Langley (loan)	2018–19	Southern League Premier Division South	6	0	—		—		—		6	0
Walton Casuals	2019–20	Southern League Premier Division South	26	4	1	0	—		2 (Note: One appearance in Southern League Cup, one appearance and one goal in FA Trophy)	1	29	5
St Albans City	2019–20	National League South	6	0	—		—		—		6	0
Braintree Town	2020–21	National League South	9	0	2	0	—		2	0	13	0
Walton Casuals	2021–22	Southern League Premier Division South	37	6	2	0	—		4 (Note: Three appearances and one goal in Southern League Cup, one appearance in FA Trophy)	1	43	7
Hendon	2022–23	Southern League Premier Division South	42	3	5	0	—		1	0	48	3
Potters Bar Town	2023–24	Isthmian League Premier Division	10	0	1	0	—		0	0	11	0
Margate	2023–24	Isthmian League Premier Division	18	0	0	0	—		1	0	19	0
Biggleswade Town	2023–24	Southern League Premier Division South	13	1	0	0	—		0	0	13	1
Bowers & Pitsea	2024–25	Isthmian League Premier Division	28	2	2	1	—		3 (Note: Two appearances in FA Trophy, one appearance and one goal in Alan Turvey Trophy)	1	33	4
Hendon	2024–25	Isthmian League Premier Division	12	0	—		—		0	0	12	0
Sittingbourne	2025–26	Isthmian League South East Division	0	0	—		—		—		0	0
Hendon	2025–26	Isthmian League South Central Division	40	1	1	0	—		5 (Note: Four appearances in FA Trophy, one in Alan Turvey Trophy)	0	46	1
Westfield	2026–27	Isthmian League South Central Division	2	1	0	0	—		0	0	2	1
Career total			385	36	25	2	0	0	27	4	437	42
