= 2014–15 Stevenage F.C. season =

Stevenage
2014–15 season
- Chairman: Phil Wallace
- Manager: Graham Westley
- Football League Two: 6th
- FA Cup: First Round
- Football League Cup: First Round
- Football League Trophy: First Round
- Top goalscorer: League: Charlie Lee (9); All: Charlie Lee (9)
- Highest home attendance: 5,503 vs. Cambridge United (14 March 2015)
- Lowest home attendance: 1,613 vs. Gillingham (2 September 2014)
- Average home league attendance: 3,180
Home colours	Away colours

The 2014–15 season was Stevenage F.C.'s first season back in League Two following relegation last season. This article shows statistics of the club's players in the season, and also lists of all matches that the club have played in the season.

== Match details ==
=== Pre-season ===
Date	Opponents	H / A	Result F–A	Scorers	Attendance
9 July 2014	Arlesey Town	A	3–0	Wells 9', Pett 20', Marriott 30'	
12 July 2014	West Ham United	H	2–2	Pett 32', Calcutt 77'	3,811
15 July 2014	Barnet	A	0–1		548
19 July 2014	Millwall	H	2–2	Walton 49', 55'	
22 July 2014	Tonbridge Angels	A	3–1	Lancaster 32', Dembélé 55', Marriott 72'	
26 July 2014	Chesham United	A	3–1	Marriott 29', 31', 50'	
29 July 2014	Reading	H	0–0		
2 August 2014	Coventry City	H	2–1	Walton 57' (p), Deacon 64' (p)	
2 August 2014	St. Albans City	A	1–1	Gorman '69	

=== League Two ===
==== League table ====
Pos	Team	Pld	W	D	L	GF	GA	GD	Pts	Promotion, qualification or relegation
4	Wycombe Wanderers	46	23	15	8	67	45	+22	84	Qualification for League Two play-offs (Note: Four teams play for one spot and promotion to Football League One.)
5	Southend United (O, P)	46	24	12	10	54	38	+16	84	Qualification for League Two play-offs
6	Stevenage	46	20	12	14	62	54	+8	72	Qualification for League Two play-offs
7	Plymouth Argyle	46	20	11	15	55	37	+18	71	Qualification for League Two play-offs
8	Luton Town	46	19	11	16	54	44	+10	68	

Updated to match(es) played on 23 May 2015. Source: BBC Sport
Rules for classification: 1) Points; 2) Goal difference; 3) Number of goals scored
(O) Play-off winners; (P) Promoted

==== Matches ====
The fixtures for the 2014–15 season were announced on 18 June 2014 at 9am.

Game	Date	Opponents	H / A	Result F–A	Scorers	Attendance
1	9 August 2014	Hartlepool United	H	1–0	Whelpdale 60'	3,023
2	16 August 2014	Southend United	A	0–2		5,397
3	19 August 2014	Plymouth Argyle	A	1–1	Calcutt 54'	6,240
4	23 August 2014	Wycombe Wanderers	H	1–3	Charles 31'	2,832
5	30 August 2014	Wimbledon	A	3–2	Wells 42', Lancaster 59', Lee 74'	3,791
6	6 September 2014	York City	H	2–3	Whelpdale 59', Pett 64'	3,090
7	13 September 2014	Shrewsbury Town	H	1–0	Charles 36'	2,840
8	16 September 2014	Bury	A	1–2	Marriott 10'	2,638
9	20 September 2014	Oxford United	A	0–0		4,658
10	27 September 2014	Mansfield Town	H	3–0	Whelpdale 3', 83', Lee 5'	2,820
11	4 October 2014	Luton Town	H	1–2	Pett 33'	5,236
12	11 October 2014	Carlisle United	A	0–3		4,011
13	18 October 2014	Accrington Stanley	H	2–1	Whelpdale 1', Lee 48'	2,398
14	21 October 2014	Portsmouth	A	2–3	Wells 23', Beardsley 74'	13,281
15	25 October 2014	Burton Albion	H	1–0	Sharps 84' (o.g.)	3,051
16	1 November 2014	Tranmere Rovers	A	2–2	Ihiekwe 14' (o.g.), Barnard 64'	4,456
17	15 November 2014	Cheltenham Town	H	5–1	Beardsley 5', 34', Lee 8', Barnard 74', 81'	2,668
18	22 November 2014	Northampton Town	A	0–1		4,431
19	29 November 2014	Morecambe	H	1–1	Walton 6' (p)	2,464
20	13 December 2014	Newport County	A	0–2		2,976
21	20 December 2014	Exeter City	H	1–0	Lee 84'	2,878
22	26 December 2014	Dagenham & Redbridge	A	2–0	Lee 50', Whelpdale 73'	1,779
23	28 December 2014	Cambridge United	H	3–2	Lee 14', Pett 32', Parrett 38'	4,579
24	3 January 2015	Morecambe	A	0–0		1,530
25	10 January 2015	Wimbledon	H	2–1	Pett 32', Walton 69' (p)	3,306
26	17 January 2015	York City	A	2–0	Marriott 39', Pett 64'	3,107
27	24 January 2015	Shrewsbury Town	A	2–3	Marriott 10', Wells 42'	4,565
28	31 January 2015	Oxford United	H	0–2		3,146
29	7 February 2015	Mansfield Town	A	0–1		2,436
30	10 February 2015	Bury	H	0–0		2,165
31	14 February 2015	Hartlepool United	A	3–1	Martin 38', Kennedy 52', 65'	3,388
32	21 February 2015	Southend United	H	4–2	Deacon 30', Walton 74' (p), Kennedy 86', Parrett 90'	3,918
33	28 February 2015	Wycombe Wanderers	A	2–2	Pett 30', Parrett 45'	3,664
34	3 March 2015	Plymouth Argyle	H	1–0	Andrade 89'	3,022
35	7 March 2015	Newport County	H	2–1	Lee 31', Dembélé 67'	2,941
36	14 March 2015	Cambridge United	H	1–1	Wells 17'	5,503
37	17 March 2015	Exeter City	A	0–0		3,149
38	21 March 2015	Dag & Red	H	0–1		2,795
39	30 March 2015	Burton Albion	A	1–1	Naylor 12' (o.g.)	3,024
40	3 April 2015	Tranmere Rovers	H	2–2	Dembélé 4', Lee 78'	3,344
41	6 April 2015	Cheltenham Town	A	1–0	Kennedy 78' (p)	2,858
42	11 April 2015	Northampton Town	H	2–1	Whelpdale 65', Walton 90'	3,378
43	14 April 2015	Portsmouth	H	1–0	Pett 3'	3,615
44	18 April 2015	Accrington Stanley	A	2–2	Walton 19' (p), Beardsley 89'	1,351
45	25 April 2015	Carlisle United	H	1–0	Parrett 47'	3,632
46	2 May 2015	Luton Town	A	0–2		10,054

=== League Two play-offs ===
Round	Date	Opponents	H / A	Result F–A	Scorers	Attendance
SF 1st Leg	10 May 2015	Southend United	H	1–1	Parrett 51'	5,183
SF 2nd Leg	14 May 2015	Southend United	A	1–3	Pett 55'	8,998

=== FA Cup ===
Round	Date	Opponents	H / A	Result F–A	Scorers	Attendance
1	9 November 2014	Maidstone United	H	0–0		2,935
1 (replay)	20 November 2014	Maidstone United	A	1–2	Charles 47'	2,226

=== League Cup ===
The draw for the first round was made on 17 June 2014 at 10am. Stevenage were drawn at home to Watford.

Round	Date	Opponents	H / A	Result F–A	Scorers	Attendance
1	12 August 2014	Watford	H	0–1		3,989

=== Football League Trophy ===
Round	Date	Opponents	H / A	Result F–A	Scorers	Attendance
1	2 September 2014	Gillingham	H	0–1		1,613

== Squad statistics ==
No.	Pos.	Name	League		FA Cup		League Cup		Other		Total		Discipline	
No.	Pos.	Name	Apps	Goals	Apps	Goals	Apps	Goals	Apps	Goals	Apps	Goals	Yellow card	Red card
1	GK	(England) Sam Beasant	8	0	0	0	1	0	0	0	9	0	0	0
2	DF	(England) Michael Richens	2	0	0	0	0	0	0	0	2	0	1	0
3	DF	(France) Bira Dembélé	25+2	2	0+1	0	1	0	1	0	27+3	2	4	0
4	DF	(England) Harry Worley	3	0	0	0	1	0	0	0	4	0	1	0
5	DF	(England) Jon Ashton	15+2	0	1	0	0+1	0	0+2	0	16+5	0	3	0
6	MF	(England) Andy Bond	16+4	0	0	0	1	0	2	0	19+4	0	4	1
7	MF	(England) Chris Whelpdale	35+4	7	2	0	1	0	3	0	41+4	7	2	0
8	MF	(England) Simon Walton	26+3	5	1+1	0	0	0	2	0	29+4	5	7	0
9	DF	(England) Darius Charles	29	2	2	1	1	0	1	0	33	3	3	0
10	FW	(Democratic Republic of the Congo) Calvin Zola	1+6	0	0	0	0	0	0+1	0	1+7	0	0	0
11	MF	(England) Tom Pett	29+4	7	1	0	1	0	1+1	1	32+5	8	4	0
13	MF	(England) Dean Parrett	28+2	4	0	0	0	0	2	1	30+2	5	4	0
14	FW	(England) Adam Marriott	9+3	3	0	0	1	0	0+1	0	10+4	3	0	0
15	FW	(England) Connor Calcutt	0+8	1	0	0	0+1	0	1	0	1+9	1	0	0
16	GK	(England) Chris Day	38	0	2	0	0	0	3	0	43	0	2	0
19	DF	(England) Dean Wells	43	4	2	0	1	0	3	0	49	4	5	0
20	FW	(England) Chris Beardsley	24+5	4	0+1	0	0	0	2	0	26+6	4	5	1
22	MF	(England) Charlie Lee	40+4	9	2	0	1	0	3	0	46+4	9	9	0
23	DF	(England) Jerome Okimo	26+3	0	1	0	1	0	3	0	31+3	0	3	0
24	DF	(England) Cameron Lancaster	4+1	1	0	0	0	0	1	0	5+1	1	0	0
25	DF	(England) Ronnie Henry	32	0	2	0	0	0	1+1	0	35+1	0	7	0
27	DF	(England) Ryan Johnson	0+3	0	0	0	0	0	0	0	0+3	0	2	1
32	MF	(England) Tom Conlon	6+7	0	0	0	0	0	0+1	0	6+8	0	1	0
34	FW	(England) Roarie Deacon	13+11	1	1+1	0	0+1	0	2+1	0	16+4	1	3	0
—	—	Own goals	–	0	–	0	–	0	–	0	–	0	–	–

== Transfers ==
=== In ===
Pos	Player	From	Fee	Date	Ref.
GK	Sam Beasant (ENG)	Woking	Free	7 June 2014	
MF	Andy Bond (ENG)	Chester	Free	7 June 2014	
DF	Harry Worley (ENG)	Newport County	Free	7 June 2014	
MF	Tom Pett (ENG)	Wealdstone	Undisclosed	20 June 2014	
DF	Dean Wells (ENG)	Braintree Town	£25,000	20 June 2014	
FW	Calvin Zola (COD)	Aberdeen	Free	20 June 2014	
DF	Ronnie Henry (ENG)	Luton Town	Free	30 June 2014	
MF	Simon Walton (ENG)	Hartlepool United	Free	30 June 2014	
MF	Chris Whelpdale (ENG)	Gillingham	Free	30 June 2014	
FW	Adam Marriott (ENG)	Cambridge City	Undisclosed	8 July 2014	
FW	Chris Beardsley (ENG)	Preston North End	Free	12 July 2014	
MF	Charlie Lee (ENG)	Gillingham	Free	12 July 2014	
FW	Connor Calcutt (ENG)	Berkhamsted	Undisclosed	9 August 2014	
DF	Jerome Okimo (ENG)	Wealdstone	Undisclosed	9 August 2014	
FW	Cameron Lancaster (ENG)	Tottenham Hotspur	Free	30 August 2014	
MF	Tom Conlon (ENG)	Peterborough United	Undisclosed	6 January 2015	
DF	Michael Richens (ENG)	Peterborough United	Undisclosed	6 January 2015	
MF	David McAlliser (IRL)	Shrewsbury Town	Free	20 January 2015	
MF	Dave Martin (ENG)	Luton Town	Free	14 February 2015	

=== Out ===
Pos	Player	To	Fee	Date	Ref.
DF	Peter Hartley (ENG)	Plymouth Argyle	Free	13 May 2014	
MF	Simon Heslop (ENG)	Mansfield Town	Free	13 May 2014	
DF	Luke Jones (ENG)	Mansfield Town	Free	13 May 2014	
MF	Filipe Morais (POR)	Bradford City	Free	13 May 2014	
DF	Sam Wedgbury (ENG)	Forest Green Rovers	Free	12 May 2014	
FW	Craig Reid (ENG)	Kidderminster Harriers	Free	14 May 2014	
GK	Steve Arnold (ENG)	Forest Green Rovers	Free	17 May 2014	
MF	Matt Ball (NIR)	Farnborough	Free	17 May 2014	
DF	Anthony Sinclair-Furlonge (CYP)	Released	Free	17 May 2014	
FW	Michael Thalassitis (CYP)	Released	Free	17 May 2014	
FW	Oumare Tounkara (FRA)	JA Drancy	Free	17 May 2014	
FW	Dani López (ESP)	La Roda	Free	17 May 2014	
FW	François Zoko (CIV)	Blackpool	Free	17 May 2014	
MF	Jimmy Smith (ENG)	Crawley Town	Undisclosed	18 May 2014	
FW	Lucas Akins (ENG)	Burton Albion	Undisclosed	18 June 2014	
FW	Jordan Burrow (ENG)	Lincoln City	Free	21 May 2014	
MF	James Dunne (ENG)	Portsmouth	Undisclosed	24 June 2014	
MF	Luke Freeman (ENG)	Bristol City	Undisclosed	26 June 2014	
FW	Marcus Haber (CAN)	Crewe Alexandra	Free	31 July 2014	

=== Loans in ===
Pos	Player	To	Date	End date	Ref.
MF	Tom Conlon (ENG)	Peterborough United	13 September 2014	1 January 2015	
DF	Michael Richens (ENG)	Peterborough United	13 September 2014	1 January 2015	
MF	Jack Jebb (ENG)	Arsenal	16 October 2014	17 January 2015	
MF	David McAllister (IRL)	Shrewsbury Town	16 October 2014	5 January 2015	
MF	Josh Clarke (ENG)	Brentford	18 October 2014	15 November 2014	
MF	Charlie Adams (ENG)	Brentford	18 October 2014	21 December 2014	
FW	Lee Barnard (ENG)	Southend United	31 October 2014	29 November 2014	
FW	Ryan Brunt (ENG)	Bristol Rovers	27 November 2014	5 January 2015	
MF	Bruno Andrade (POR)	Queens Park Rangers	2 February 2015	31 March 2015	
FW	Danny Johnson (ENG)	Cardiff City	2 February 2015	31 March 2015	
MF	Keith Keane (IRL)	Preston North End	5 March 2015	1 April 2015	
FW	Kevin Lisbie (JAM)	Leyton Orient	17 March 2015	16 April 2015	
MF	Jack Jebb (ENG)	Arsenal	26 March 2015	30 June 2015	

=== Loans out ===
Pos	Player	To	Date	End date	Ref.
MF	Joseph N'Guessan (ENG)	Aldershot Town	2 August 2014	2 January 2015	
FW	Fejiri Okenabirhie (ENG)	Farnborough	4 August 2014	23 January 2015	
DF	George Allen (ENG)	Bishop's Stortford	8 August 2014	30 June 2015	
MF	Rohdell Gordon (ENG)	Chelmsford City	14 August 2014	January 2015	
DF	Ryan Johnson (ENG)	Boreham Wood	24 October 2014	21 November 2014	
FW	Connor Calcutt (ENG)	Wealdstone	24 October 2014	22 November 2014	
FW	Fejiri Okenabirhie (ENG)	Cambridge City	23 January 2015	30 June 2015	
