= Jack Jebb =

English footballer

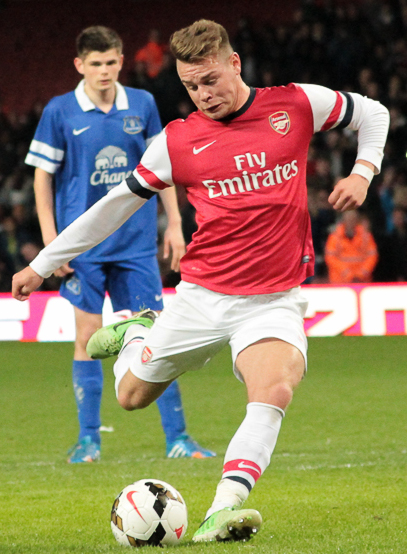

Personal information
- Full name: Jack McCauley Jebb
- Date of birth: 11 September 1995 (age 31)
- Place of birth: Kensington, England
- Position: Midfielder

Team information
- Current team: Carshalton Athletic

Youth career
- –2012: Arsenal

Senior career*
Years	Team	Apps	(Gls)
2012–2015	Arsenal	0	(0)
2014	→ Stevenage (loan)	4	(0)
2015	→ Stevenage (loan)	5	(0)
2015–2016	Stevenage	5	(0)
2016–2017	Newport County	5	(0)
2017	Sutton United	13	(1)
2017–2019	Welling United	55	(9)
2019–2020	Wealdstone	10	(0)
2020–2022	Dartford	52	(7)
2022–2024	Dorking Wanderers	22	(0)
2023	→ Havant & Waterlooville (loan)	10	(2)
2023–2024	→ Havant & Waterlooville (loan)	32	(0)
2024–2026	Folkestone Invicta	45	(4)
2026	→ Croydon Athletic (loan)	4	(1)
2026	→ Eastbourne Borough (loan)	5	(1)
2026–	Carshalton Athletic	1	(1)

International career^{‡}
2011	England U16	2	(1)
2011–2012	England U17	5	(1)
- * Club domestic league appearances and goals as of 17:25, 10 August 2026 (UTC) ‡ National team caps and goals as of 22:10, 9 February 2022 (UTC)

Jack McCauley Jebb (born 11 September 1995) is an English professional footballer who plays as a midfielder for Isthmian League Premier Division club Carshalton Athletic.

== Club career ==
Dubbed the "new Jack Wilshere" and described as a "technically-gifted central midfielder", Jebb signed his first professional contract with Arsenal in September 2012. Having played regularly for Arsenal's Under-18s, Jebb joined League Two club Stevenage on a one-month loan on 16 October 2014. He made his league debut for Stevenage two days later against Accrington Stanley, coming on as a 56th-minute substitute for Dean Parrett.

Jebb rejoined Stevenage on loan until the end of the 2014–15 season on 26 March 2015. He joined the club on a one-year deal on 1 September 2015. He was released by Stevenage at the end of the 2015–16 season.

Jebb joined League Two Newport County on 8 November 2016 on a short-term contract and made his debut the same day in the starting line-up for the EFL Trophy match against AFC Wimbledon. Newport won the game 2–0. He was released by Newport on 9 January 2017.

After leaving Newport, Jebb signed for National League side Sutton United. On 11 February 2017, Jebb made his first appearance for Sutton in a 3–0 away defeat to Solihull Moors, coming on as a 56th-minute substitute for Dan Spence. He made his full club debut three days later on 14 February in a 2–1 away defeat to Guiseley. On 5 April, Jebb came on as a 71st-minute substitute to score his first goal for Sutton in a 3–2 loss to Tranmere Rovers.

On 8 June 2022, Jebb joined newly promoted National League side Dorking Wanderers following his departure from Dartford.

On 4 March 2023, Jebb joined National League South side Havant & Waterlooville on loan till end of the season. He returned to the club on loan in September 2023.

On 3 May 2024, it was announced that Jebb would leave the club at the end of his contract in June.

On 4 May 2024, Jebb was announced to be joining Isthmian League Premier club Folkestone Invicta.

On 20 February 2026, Jebb joined Croydon Athletic on a 28-day loan.

On 18 March 2026, Jebb joined National League South side Eastbourne Borough on loan until the end of the season.

== International career ==
Jebb featured for England at schoolboy level picking up caps in the U16 and U17 levels. He scored a headed goal in a final for England U17s versus Portugal at Northampton's Sixfields Stadium and helped the side retain the FA International U17 Tournament trophy. He was also selected for the European Championship Elite Qualifying Round squad in 2012.

== Career statistics ==
As of match played 25 April 2026

Appearances and goals by club, season and competition
Club	Season	League			FA Cup		EFL Cup		Other		Total	
Club	Season	Division	Apps	Goals	Apps	Goals	Apps	Goals	Apps	Goals	Apps	Goals
Arsenal	2014–15	Premier League	0	0	—		0	0	0	0	0	0
Stevenage (loan)	2014–15	League Two	9	0	1	0	—		0	0	10	0
Stevenage	2015–16	League Two	5	0	0	0	0	0	0	0	5	0
Newport County	2016–17	League Two	5	0	1	0	—		1 (Note: Appearance in EFL Trophy)	0	7	0
Sutton United	2016–17	National League	13	1	—		—		—		13	1
Welling United	2017–18	National League South	35	6	1	0	—		1 (Note: Appearances in FA Trophy)	0	37	6
Welling United	2018–19	National League South	13	3	2	1	—		0	0	15	4
Welling United	2019–20	National League South	7	0	4	1	—		0	0	11	1
Welling United	Total		55	9	7	2	—		1	0	63	11
Wealdstone	2019–20	National League South	10	0	—		—		1	0	11	0
Dartford	2019–20	National League South	3	1	—		—		3 (Note: Appearances in National League South play-offs)	0	6	1
Dartford	2020–21	National League South	15	1	0	0	—		2	0	17	1
Dartford	2021–22	National League South	34	5	2	1	—		4 (Note: Three appearances and one goal in FA Trophy, one appearance in National League South play-offs)	1	40	7
Dartford	Total		52	7	2	1	—		9	1	63	9
Dorking Wanderers	2022–23	National League	21	0	0	0	—		3	0	24	0
Dorking Wanderers	2023–24	National League	1	0	0	0	—		0	0	1	0
Dorking Wanderers	Total		22	0	0	0	—		3	0	25	0
Havant & Waterlooville (loan)	2022–23	National League South	10	2	—		—		—		10	2
Havant & Waterlooville (loan)	2023–24	National League South	32	0	1	0	—		1	0	34	0
Havant & Waterlooville (loan)	Total		42	2	1	0	—		1	0	44	2
Folkestone Invicta	2024–25	Isthmian Premier Division	24	4	0	0	—		4 (Note: Three appearances in FA Trophy, one appearance in Kent Senior Cup)	0	28	4
Folkestone Invicta	2025–26	Isthmian Premier Division	21	0	2	0	—		4 (Note: Three appearances and one goal in FA Trophy, one appearance in Kent Senior Cup)	1	27	1
Folkestone Invicta	Total		45	4	2	0	—		8	1	55	5
Croydon Athletic (loan)	2025–26	Isthmian South East Division	4	1	—		—		0	0	4	1
Eastbourne Borough (loan)	2025–26	National League South	5	1	—		—		0	0	5	1
Career total			267	25	14	3	0	0	24	2	305	30
