= Ben Kennedy (footballer, born 1997) =

Northern Irish footballer

Personal information
- Full name: Ben James Kennedy
- Date of birth: 12 January 1997 (age 29)
- Place of birth: Lisburn, Northern Ireland
- Height: 5 ft 10 in (1.78 m)
- Positions: Midfielder; forward

Team information
- Current team: Ballymena United
- Number: 9

Youth career
- 2013–2015: Stevenage

Senior career*
Years	Team	Apps	(Gls)
2015–2020	Stevenage	151	(27)
2019	→ Newport County (loan)	10	(1)
2020–2024	Crusaders	85	(32)
2024–	Ballymena United	37	(16)

International career
2013	Northern Ireland U17	2	(0)
2015–2016	Northern Ireland U19	5	(2)
2016–2018	Northern Ireland U21	7	(0)
- * Club domestic league appearances and goals as of 23 February 2026

Ben James Kennedy (born 12 January 1997) is a Northern Irish professional footballer who plays as a midfielder or forward for NIFL Premiership club Ballymena United.

Kennedy joined Stevenage on a two-year youth scholarship in the summer of 2013 and broke into the first team during the 2014–15 season. He signed for Newport County on loan in January 2019 before returning to Stevenage at the end of the 2018–19 season. He was released by Stevenage in June 2020 and joined Crusaders of the NIFL Premiership two months later. He won two Irish Cups with Crusaders before moving to Ballymena United in 2024.

He has also represented Northern Ireland at under-17, under-19 and under-21 level.

== Early life ==
Kennedy was born in Lisburn, Northern Ireland. He is the nephew of former Northern Ireland international Peter Kennedy.

== Club career ==
=== Stevenage ===
Kennedy was scouted by Stevenage academy manager Darren Sarll whilst playing for Northern Ireland at youth level in the summer of 2013. Sarll spoke to Kennedy's parents and offered Kennedy the opportunity to train with the club's youth academy. He accepted the offer, played one match for the Stevenage under-18 team and subsequently signed a two-year scholarship with the club ahead of the 2013–14 season. Kennedy impressed Stevenage manager Graham Westley whilst competing in the 2014–15 FA Youth Cup, particularly in the club's 2–1 extra-time defeat to Everton under-18s in the third round of the competition in December 2014. Two days after the match against Everton, he trained with the first team, and he made his first-team debut a month later, on 31 January 2015, coming on as a second-half substitute in a 2–0 League Two defeat against Oxford United at Broadhall Way. Kennedy scored his first professional goals on 14 February 2015, scoring twice in a 3–1 victory away at Hartlepool United. Four days after scoring his first two goals for the club, he signed his first professional contract. Kennedy scored four goals in 17 games during his first season in professional football, helping Stevenage reach the League Two play-offs, where they lost at the semi-final stage to Southend United.

Kennedy had to wait until late September to make his first appearance of the 2015–16 season as a result of undergoing hip surgery in the summer of 2015. He was a regular in the first team under new Stevenage manager Teddy Sheringham upon his return from injury. He signed an improved three-year contract with the club on 15 October 2015. Kennedy was given personal leave "for a few weeks" in December 2015, before sustaining a knee injury in training a month later that was expected to keep him out of action for the remainder of the season. However, six weeks after knee surgery, Kennedy came on as a 71st-minute substitute in a 2–0 home defeat to Exeter City. Sheringham was replaced as manager by Darren Sarll, who bought Kennedy to the club three years earlier. He made 25 appearances in a season that marked Kennedy's first full season as a professional; scoring three goals, as Stevenage lost once in their remaining nine league fixtures to secure their League Two status for a further season.

Following an injury-free pre-season, Kennedy began the 2016–17 season as a regular in the starting line-up. He scored his first goal of the season in Stevenage's 1–0 victory against Ipswich Town at Portman Road in the EFL Cup. He scored his final goal of the season in a 2–0 away victory against Luton Town on 11 March 2017. The goal was voted as Stevenage's goal of the season as Kennedy "chested the ball down just inside Luton's half, dribbled to the edge of the area and unleashed a right-footed shot into the top corner of the net". In April 2017, Kennedy signed a new two-year contract with Stevenage, running until the summer of 2019. Kennedy scored nine times in 39 appearances during the season as the club finished in 10th place in League Two.

==== Loan to Newport County ====
Kennedy joined fellow League Two club Newport County on loan on 31 January 2019, for the remainder of the 2018–19 season. Stevenage chairman Phil Wallace stated the club had "little choice" in the loan move with Kennedy having "made it clear" that he did not want to remain at the club, feeling that "a different environment would allow him to play his best football". Kennedy made his Newport debut in the club's 3–0 away defeat at Grimsby Town on 2 February 2019. He made 10 appearances during the loan spell, scoring once; his goal for the club came in a 3–1 victory at Yeovil Town on 30 March 2019.

==== Return to Stevenage ====
Kennedy returned to Stevenage upon the expiry of his loan agreement at Newport and made 21 appearances during the 2019–20 season, which was curtailed in March 2020 due to the COVID-19 pandemic. He was included in the club's released list in June 2020.

=== Crusaders ===
Kennedy signed for NIFL Premiership club Crusaders on 24 August 2020, agreeing a three-year contract. He debuted for Crusaders in the opening match of the 2020–21 season against Dundela on 10 October 2020, scoring two penalties in a 2–0 victory. He won his first trophy with the club on 7 May 2022 as Crusaders won the 2021–22 Irish Cup with a 2–1 extra-time victory against Ballymena United.

=== Ballymena United ===
Kennedy signed for Ballymena United on 26 July 2024.

== International career ==
Having earned two caps for Northern Ireland's under-17 team in 2013, Kennedy made the step up to under-19 level following his breakthrough into the Stevenage first team in 2015. He captained the under-19 team and scored two goals in five appearances. Kennedy was called up to the under-21 team in October 2016, and played seven times at that level.

== Personal life ==
In 2020 Kennedy was given a five-month prison sentence, suspended for two years, and was fined £100 after a hearing at Lisburn Magistrates Court for breaching coronavirus regulations.

== Career statistics ==
As of match played 19 September 2024

Appearances and goals by club, season and competition
Club	Season	League			National Cup		League Cup		Other		Total	
Club	Season	Division	Apps	Goals	Apps	Goals	Apps	Goals	Apps	Goals	Apps	Goals
Stevenage	2014–15	League Two	15	4	0	0	0	0	2 (Note: Appearances in League Two play-offs)	0	17	4
Stevenage	2015–16	League Two	22	2	2	0	0	0	1 (Note: Appearance(s) in EFL Trophy)	1	25	3
Stevenage	2016–17	League Two	36	8	1	0	1	1	1	0	39	9
Stevenage	2017–18	League Two	35	7	2	0	0	0	0	0	37	7
Stevenage	2018–19	League Two	25	6	1	0	0	0	2	2	28	8
Stevenage	2019–20	League Two	18	0	0	0	0	0	3	0	21	0
Stevenage	Total		151	27	6	0	1	1	9	3	167	31
Newport County (loan)	2018–19	League Two	10	1	—		—		—		10	1
Crusaders	2020–21	NIFL Premiership	24	5	4	1	—		2	2	30	8
Crusaders	2021–22	NIFL Premiership	31	12	5	2	2	1	0	0	38	15
Crusaders	2022–23	NIFL Premiership	2	2	2	0	0	0	4 (Note: One appearance in NIFL Charity Shield and three appearances in UEFA Europa Conference League)	0	8	2
Crusaders	2023–24	NIFL Premiership	28	13	0	0	2	3	7 (Note: One appearance in NIFL Charity Shield, four appearances in UEFA Europa Conference League, two appearances and one goal in Conference League play-offs)	1	37	17
Crusaders	2024–25	NIFL Premiership	0	0	0	0	0	0	2 (Note: Appearances in UEFA Conference League)	1	2	1
Crusaders	Total		85	32	11	3	4	4	15	4	115	43
Ballymena United	2024–25	NIFL Premiership	8	8	0	0	0	0	0	0	8	8
Career total			254	69	17	3	5	5	24	7	300	83

== Honours ==
Crusaders

- Irish Cup: 2021–22, 2022–23
- NIFL Charity Shield: 2022, 2023
