= Adam Marriott =

English footballer (born 1991)

Personal information
- Full name: Adam James Marriott
- Date of birth: 14 April 1991 (age 35)
- Place of birth: Brandon, England
- Height: 1.75 m (5 ft 9 in)
- Position: Striker

Youth career
- –2006: Norwich City
- 2006–2009: Cambridge United

Senior career*
Years	Team	Apps	(Gls)
2009–2012	Cambridge United	56	(10)
2012	→ Cambridge City (loan)	5	(4)
2012	→ Bishop's Stortford (loan)	6	(2)
2012–2014	Cambridge City	69	(57)
2014–2016	Stevenage	19	(3)
2016–2017	Lincoln City	20	(4)
2017–2018	Royston Town	35	(27)
2018	Boston United	7	(1)
2018–2021	King's Lynn Town	83	(58)
2021	Eastleigh	11	(1)
2021–2022	Barnet	36	(18)
2022–2024	Bromley	30	(10)
2024	→ Boston United (loan)	6	(0)
2024–2025	Boston United	29	(2)
2025–2026	King's Lynn Town	27	(3)
- * Club domestic league appearances and goals as of 17:40, 12 June 2025 (UTC)

Adam James Marriott (born 14 April 1991) is an English footballer who plays as a forward.

== Career ==
=== Early career ===
Beginning his career in the youth academy of Norwich City, he left the club at the age of 15 in 2006, eventually moving onto Cambridge United, making his first-team debut in 2009. During his tenure with the side, he made 56 league appearances, 35 of which were from the substitutes' bench. He spent some time on loan at Conference North side Bishop's Stortford, scoring twice in six appearances.

=== Cambridge City ===
He moved onto city rivals Cambridge City ahead of the 2013–14 season, a drop of two divisions into the Southern League Premier Division. He was prolific at this level, scoring 45 goals in 42 games as the Lilywhites finished 3rd. They were ultimately unsuccessful in their play-off campaign, and following interest from various Football League outfits, Marriott moved onto Stevenage for an undisclosed five-figure fee in July 2014.

=== Stevenage ===
After a successful pre-season campaign that saw him score five goals, including a hat-trick against Chesham United, Marriott made his Football League bow in a League Two game against Hartlepool United, which Stevenage won 1–0.

=== Lincoln City ===
In June 2016 it was announced that Marriott would join Lincoln City as their 4th summer signing when his contract expired at Stevenage. He scored on his competitive debut for Lincoln against Woking as the Imps ran out 3-1 winners. He was part of the team that won the National League for the Imps in 2016/17. He also played an important role in their famous run to the FA Cup quarter final that season, including the crucial assist against Ipswich in round 3 and an appearance against Arsenal in the quarterfinal.

=== Royston Town ===
After helping Lincoln to gain promotion to the Football League, Marriott decided to drop down to the Southern Premier and signed for Royston Town.

Marriott scored 31 goals in 43 appearances for the Crows, helping them to finish 7th in the league table only just missing out on a place in the play-offs.

=== Boston United ===
In July 2018, Boston United announced Marriott had signed for the club on a one-year contract.

=== King's Lynn Town ===
Marriott signed for Southern League Premier Central side King's Lynn Town on 9 October 2018. Despite only joining the Norfolk club in October, Marriott went on to secure the Southern Premier Central League Golden Boot by scoring 24 league goals for The Linnets, which helped them finish as league runners up and qualify for the end of season playoffs. Marriott's goalscoring form continued in the playoffs with two goals in the Central Premier Final victory over Alvechurch. He then netted a late equalizer from the penalty spot in the Super Play Off against Warrington Town which took the game to extra time. King's Lynn went on to win that game and secure promotion to National League North.

Despite King's Lynn being tipped to struggle in National League North, they sat top of the division at Christmas. Marriott's goalscoring form had seen him hit 21 league goals in the opening 20 games. His goal against Gateshead on 30 November 2019 was his 50th for King's Lynn Town, in just 61 games. The Linnets won the title and a second successive promotion on points per game following the curtailment of the season due to the COVID-19 pandemic. Marriott finished his Linnets career in April 2021 with 66 goals in 99 games.

=== Eastleigh ===
Marriott joined Eastleigh on 9 April 2021 on a permanent transfer until the end of the season. His first goal for the club came on 24 April 2021, with the only goal in a 1–0 victory over automatic promotion hopefuls Sutton United, helping Eastleigh's own play-off chances.

=== Barnet ===
Marriott signed for Barnet in July 2021. He scored 20 goals in the 2021–22 season, winning the Barnet F.C. Player of the Season award in May 2022. Despite this, Marriott turned down a new contract and left the club.

=== Bromley ===
On 14 June 2022, following his release from Barnet, Marriott signed for National League rivals Bromley.

In February 2024, he returned to Boston United on an initial one-month loan deal.

=== Boston United ===
Following Boston United's promotion to the National League, Marriott returned on a permanent basis in June 2024.

=== King's Lynn Town ===
On 12 June 2025, Marriott returned to National League North side King's Lynn Town.

== Career statistics ==
As of 31 January 2024

Appearances and goals by club, season and competition
Club	Season	League			FA Cup		League Cup		Other		Total	
Club	Season	Division	Apps	Goals	Apps	Goals	Apps	Goals	Apps	Goals	Apps	Goals
Cambridge United	2009–10	Conference Premier	10	4	3	1	—		4 (Note: Appearances in FA Trophy)	0	17	5
Cambridge United	2010–11	Conference Premier	33	3	0	0	—		3	1	36	4
Cambridge United	2011–12	Conference Premier	11	3	1	0	—		3	0	15	4
Cambridge United	2012–13	Conference Premier	2	0	—		—		—		2	0
Cambridge United	Total		56	10	4	1	—		10	1	70	12
Cambridge City (loan)	2011–12	SFL Premier Division	5	4	—		—		—		5	4
Bishop's Stortford (loan)	2012–13	Conference North	6	2	—		—		—		6	2
Cambridge City	2012–13	SFL Premier Division	32	17	2	0	—		—		34	17
Cambridge City	2013–14	SFL Premier Division	37	40	1	1	—		4 (Note: One appearance and one goal in Southern League Premier Division play-offs, three appearances and three goals in FA Trophy)	4	42	45
Cambridge City	Total		69	57	3	1	—		4	4	76	62
Stevenage	2014–15	League Two	13	3	0	0	1	0	1 (Note: Appearance in Football League Trophy)	0	15	3
Stevenage	2015–16	League Two	6	0	1	0	0	0	0	0	7	0
Stevenage	Total		19	3	1	0	1	0	1	0	22	3
Lincoln City	2016–17	National League	20	4	1	0	—		3	0	24	4
Royston Town	2017–18	SFL Premier Division	35	27	3	2	—		6 (Note: Two appearances and one goal in FA Trophy, two appearances and one goal in Herts Senior Cup, one appearance in Southern League Cup, one appearance in Herts Charity Cup)	2	44	31
Boston United	2018–19	National League North	7	1	1	0	—		0	0	8	1
King's Lynn Town	2018–19	SFL Premier Division Central	33	24	0	0	—		4 (Note: One appearance and one goal in FA Trophy, two appearances and two goals in Southern Football League play-offs, one appearance and one goal in Step 3 super play-offs)	4	37	28
King's Lynn Town	2019–20	National League North	31	28	4	2	—		4	0	39	30
King's Lynn Town	2020–21	National League	19	6	2	0	—		2	2	23	8
King's Lynn Town	Total		83	58	6	2	—		10	6	99	66
Eastleigh	2020–21	National League	11	1	—		—		0	0	11	1
Barnet	2021–22	National League	36	18 (Note: The goal scored on 14 September 2021, originally attributed to Sam Granville and still listed as such by some sources, was actually scored by Marriott.)	1	0	—		4 (Note: One appearance in FA Trophy, three appearances and two goals in Middlesex Senior Cup)	2	41	20
Bromley	2022–23	National League	29	11	1	0	—		1	0	31	11
Bromley	2023–24	National League	3	0	0	0	—		0	0	3	0
Bromley	Total		32	11	1	0	0	0	1	0	34	11
Career total			379	206	18	4	1	0	34	13	440	228
