= Dean Parrett =

English footballer (born 1991)

Personal information
- Full name: Dean Gary Parrett
- Date of birth: 16 November 1991 (age 34)
- Place of birth: Hampstead, England
- Height: 5 ft 10 in (1.78 m)
- Position: Midfielder

Youth career
- 2006–2007: Queens Park Rangers
- 2007–2008: Tottenham Hotspur

Senior career*
Years	Team	Apps	(Gls)
2008–2013	Tottenham Hotspur	0	(0)
2009	→ Aldershot Town (loan)	4	(0)
2010	→ Plymouth Argyle (loan)	8	(1)
2011	→ Charlton Athletic (loan)	9	(1)
2012	→ Yeovil Town (loan)	10	(1)
2013	→ Swindon Town (loan)	3	(0)
2013–2016	Stevenage	69	(8)
2016–2018	AFC Wimbledon	55	(7)
2018–2019	Gillingham	27	(1)
2019–2020	Stevenage	17	(0)
2020	Wealdstone	4	(0)
2020–2021	Barnet	2	(0)
2022	Biggleswade Town	6	(1)
Total		214	(20)

International career
2006–2007	England U16	7	(0)
2007–2008	England U17	5	(0)
2009–2010	England U19	11	(4)
2011	England U20	3	(0)
- * Club domestic league appearances and goals as of 17:10, 31 June 2022 (UTC)

Dean Gary Parrett (born 16 November 1991) is an English former professional footballer who played as a midfielder. He played in the Football League for several clubs and represented England from under-16 to under-20 level.

== Career ==
=== Tottenham Hotspur ===
Born in Hampstead, London, Parrett signed for the Tottenham Hotspur Academy from Queens Park Rangers in February 2007. He made his first team debut for Tottenham in a UEFA Cup match against Shakhtar Donetsk on 19 February 2009. He joined League Two team Aldershot Town on a month's loan on 17 September. Aldershot enquired for an extension but instead Parrett returned to Spurs on 23 October after playing four games. He signed a new three-year contract at White Hart Lane in August 2010, before joining Plymouth Argyle on loan until the end of the 2010–11 season. He scored his first career goal whilst at Plymouth in a 3–1 win over Bristol Rovers. On 10 November 2010, it was mutually agreed between Tottenham and Argyle that Parrett's loan be cut short and he returned to Tottenham.

In March 2011, Parrett signed for League One side Charlton Athletic on loan until the end of the 2010–11 season. He scored once for Charlton in a 3–1 win over Rochdale.

On 13 January 2012, Parrett signed on loan with Yeovil Town for one month, which was extended until the end of the season on 8 February 2012, and he scored in the 3–2 win over Colchester United on 18 February 2012.

On 28 March 2013, Parrett sign to Swindon Town on loan along with fellow Spurs trainees Nathan Byrne and Massimo Luongo. The very next day he went straight into the squad to face Oldham and play the full 90 minutes in a 1–1 result.

Swindon terminated the loan abruptly on 11 April 2013 with Manager, Kevin MacDonald unwilling to explain the reason publicly. Parrett returned to Tottenham and was subsequently released by the club in June 2013.

=== Stevenage ===
On 17 October 2013, Stevenage signed Parrett who was a free agent till the end of the 2013–14 season. On 12 May 2014, Parrett signed a new contract extension at the club.

=== AFC Wimbledon ===
On 1 July 2016, Parrett left Stevenage for newly promoted League One club AFC Wimbledon, joining former Stevenage teammates Darius Charles and Chris Whelpdale. He scored his first goal for the club, a penalty, in a 2–0 win over Gillingham on 1 October 2016.

=== Gillingham ===
On 30 May 2018 Parrett signed for Gillingham. He made his debut for the club on 4 August 2018, in a League One fixture away to Accrington Stanley. He made 31 appearances for the club in total, scoring one goal.

=== Return to Stevenage ===
After his contract was terminated by Gillingham in July 2019, Parrett rejoined Stevenage. Parrett was released by the club at the end of the 2019–20 season which saw Stevenage relegated to the National League. He made a total of 22 appearances across all competitions for the club in his second spell, scoring one goal in a 1–2 loss to Southend in the EFL Cup.

=== Wealdstone ===
Parrett joined Wealdstone on 21 November 2020 on a non-contract basis.

=== Barnet ===
The following month, the Stones allowed Parrett to begin talks with Barnet over a move. Parrett joined the Bees on a short-term deal on 12 December 2020. He was released on 8 January 2021 after only two appearances.

=== Later career ===
In March 2022, Parrett signed for Southern League Premier Division Central side Biggleswade Town.

== Career statistics ==
As of match played 19 March 2022

Appearances and goals by club, season and competition
Club	Season	League			FA Cup		League Cup		Continental		Other		Total	
Club	Season	Division	Apps	Goals	Apps	Goals	Apps	Goals	Apps	Goals	Apps	Goals	Apps	Goals
Tottenham Hotspur	2008–09	Premier League	0	0	0	0	0	0	2 (Note: Appearances in the UEFA Cup/UEFA Europa League)	0	0	0	2	0
Tottenham Hotspur	2009–10	Premier League	0	0	0	0	0	0	0	0	0	0	0	0
Tottenham Hotspur	2010–11	Premier League	0	0	0	0	0	0	0	0	0	0	0	0
Tottenham Hotspur	2011–12	Premier League	0	0	0	0	0	0	2	0	0	0	2	0
Tottenham Hotspur	Total		0	0	0	0	0	0	4	0	0	0	4	0
Aldershot Town (loan)	2009–10	League Two	4	0	0	0	0	0	—		0	0	4	0
Plymouth Argyle (loan)	2010–11	League One	8	1	1	0	0	0	—		0	0	10	1
Charlton Athletic (loan)	2010–11	League One	9	1	0	0	0	0	—		0	0	9	1
Yeovil Town (loan)	2011–12	League One	10	1	0	0	0	0	—		0	0	10	1
Swindon Town (loan)	2012–13	League One	3	0	0	0	0	0	—		0	0	3	0
Stevenage	2013–14	League One	12	1	3	0	0	0	—		1 (Note: Appearances in the Football League Trophy)	0	16	1
Stevenage	2014–15	League Two	30	4	0	0	0	0	—		2 (Note: Appearances in the League Two play-offs)	1	32	5
Stevenage	2015–16	League Two	27	3	1	0	1	0	—		1	0	30	3
Stevenage	Total		69	8	4	0	1	0	—		4	1	78	9
AFC Wimbledon	2016–17	League One	32	5	5	1	1	0	—		4	0	42	6
AFC Wimbledon	2017–18	League One	23	2	0	0	1	0	—		1	1	25	3
AFC Wimbledon	Total		55	7	5	1	2	0	—		5	1	67	9
Gillingham	2018–19	League One	27	1	2	0	0	0	—		2	0	31	1
Stevenage	2019–20	League Two	17	0	1	0	1	1	—		3	0	22	1
Wealdstone	2020–21	National League	4	0	0	0	—		—		0	0	4	0
Barnet	2020–21	National League	2	0	0	0	—		—		0	0	2	0
Biggleswade Town	2021–22	SFL – Premier Division Central	6	1	0	0	—		—		0	0	6	1
Career total			214	20	17	1	5	1	4	0	18	3	258	25
