= Jerome Okimo =

English footballer (born 1988)

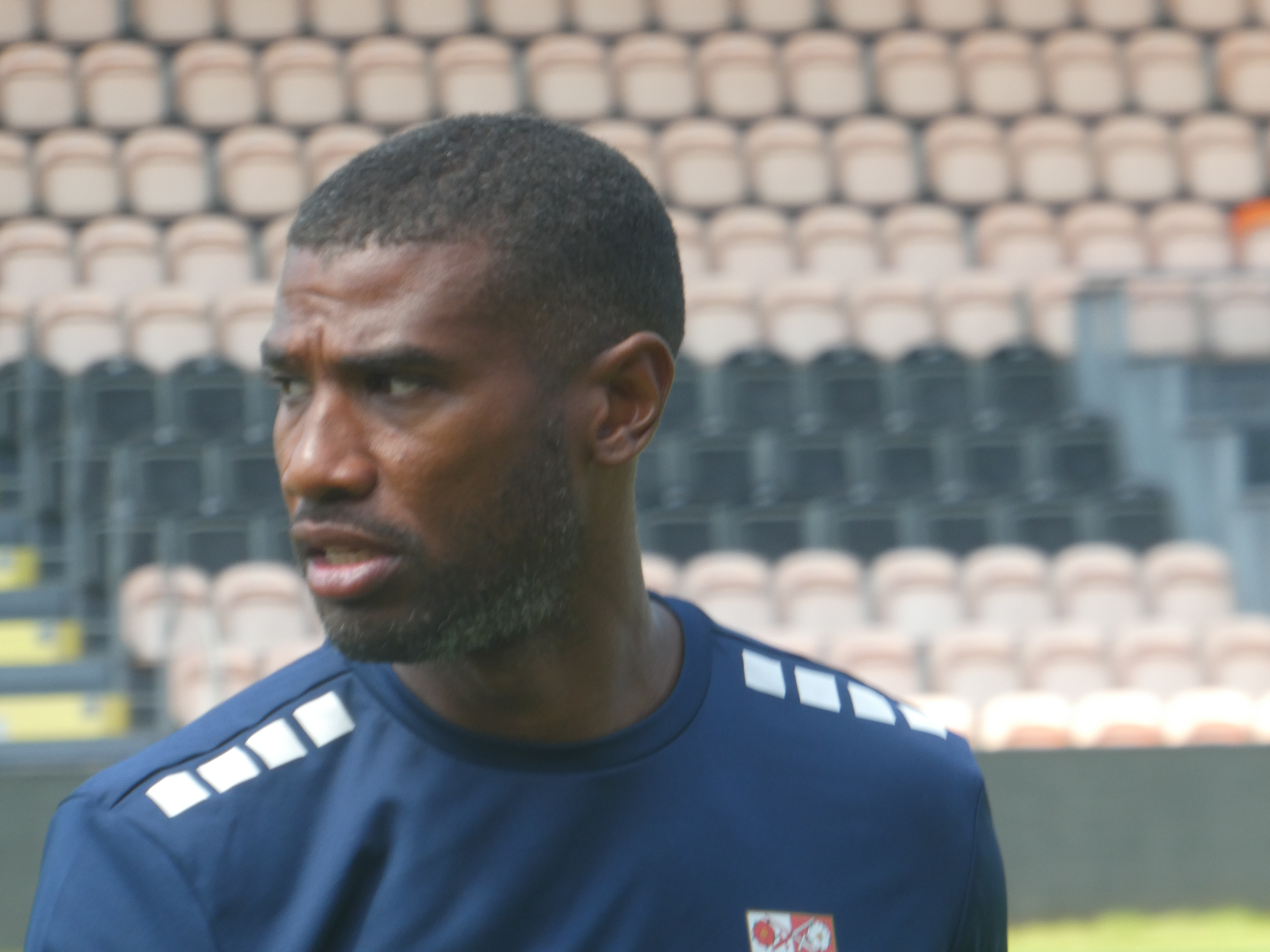
- Okimo in 2026

Personal information
- Full name: Jerome Okide O. N. Okimo
- Date of birth: 8 June 1988 (age 38)
- Place of birth: Ealing, England
- Position: Defender

Team information
- Current team: Barnet (coach)

Youth career
- –2006: Chalfont St. Peter

Senior career*
Years	Team	Apps	(Gls)
2006–2013	Chalfont St. Peter	308	
2012	→ Wingate & Finchley (loan)	1	(0)
2013–2014	Wealdstone	38	(0)
2014–2016	Stevenage	42	(1)
2016–2017	Braintree Town	46	(1)
2017–2022	Wealdstone	195	(6)
2022–2025	Barnet	97	(2)
Total		419	(10)
- * Club domestic league appearances and goals

Jerome Okide O. N. Okimo (born 8 June 1988) is a retired English professional footballer who is currently a coach for EFL League Two club Barnet.

== Club career ==
=== Non-league football ===
Okimo began his career at Chalfont St. Peter where he made 308 appearances. During his time there, Okimo went on trial at Football League side Gillingham in 2009 but missed out on a contract after injuring his Achilles tendon. After seven years at Chalfont St. Peter, Okimo moved to Isthmian League Premier Division side Wealdstone in the summer of 2013, going on to play an instrumental role in their promotion to the Conference South in 2014, making 38 league appearances.

=== Stevenage ===
In August 2014, Okimo followed former Wealdstone teammate Tom Pett (who signed for them in June 2014) to Stevenage, making his debut as an 83rd-minute substitute in a 1–0 win over Hartlepool United on 9 August 2014. Okimo was released after two seasons at the club in May 2016.

=== Braintree Town ===
In July 2016, he signed for National League side Braintree Town on a free transfer following his release from Stevenage.

=== Wealdstone ===
After leaving Braintree, Okimo re-signed for Wealdstone in July 2017. He captained the club to their 2019–20 National League South title win, playing 32 of the 33 league games and scoring 3 goals before the season was curtailed due to the COVID-19 pandemic, with Wealdstone promoted on points per game. He was named in the National League South Team of the Year as a result of his performances. Okimo started and captained every game of the 2020–21 season, scoring a solitary goal against Barnet. On 14 June 2022 Jerome Okimo left the club to seek regular first team football.

=== Barnet ===
On 17 June 2022, Okimo agreed to join Barnet in the role of player-coach. After 116 appearances and two goals for the Bees, across three seasons, Okimo retired from playing following Barnet's 2024-25 National League title win, remaining with the club as a coach.

== Coaching career ==
As of 2024, Okimo was a coach for Brentford's Community Sports Trust.

== Career statistics ==
As of end of 2024-25 season

Appearances and goals by club, season and competition
Club	Season	League			FA Cup		League Cup		Other		Total	
Club	Season	Division	Apps	Goals	Apps	Goals	Apps	Goals	Apps	Goals	Apps	Goals
Chalfont St Peter	2010–11	Spartan South Midlands League Premier Division	31	0	1	0	—		6 (Note: Three appearances and one goal in FA Vase, three in Spartan South Midlands Football League Challenge Trophy)	1	38	1
Chalfont St Peter	2011–12	Southern League Division One Central	37	0	2	0	—		1 (Note: Appearance(s) in Southern League Cup)	0	40	0
Chalfont St Peter	2012–13	Southern League Division One Central	41	2	5	0	—		2 (Note: One appearance in FA Trophy, one in Southern League Cup)	0	48	2
Chalfont St Peter	Total		109	2	8	0	—		9	1	128	3
Wealdstone	2013–14	Isthmian League Premier Division	38	0	1	1	—		5 (Note: Three appearances in FA Trophy, two in Isthmian League Cup)	0	44	1
Stevenage	2014–15	League Two	29	0	1	0	1	0	3 (Note: One appearance in Football League Trophy, two in League Two play-offs)	0	34	0
Stevenage	2015–16	League Two	13	1	0	0	1	0	0	0	14	1
Stevenage	Total		42	1	1	0	2	0	3	0	48	1
Braintree Town	2016–17	National League	46	1	3	0	—		4 (Note: Appearances in FA Trophy)	1	53	2
Wealdstone	2017–18	National League South	42	0	2	0	—		7	0	51	0
Wealdstone	2018–19	National League South	43	1	1	0	—		1	0	45	1
Wealdstone	2019–20	National League South	32	3	2	0	—		1	1	34	4
Wealdstone	2020–21	National League	42	1	1	0	—		3	0	46	1
Wealdstone	2021–22	National League	36	1	1	0	—		1	0	38	1
Wealdstone	Total		195	6	7	0	0	0	16	1	218	7
Barnet	2022–23	National League	44	1	4	0	—		6 (Note: Five appearances in FA Trophy, one in National League playoffs)	0	54	1
Barnet	2023–24	National League	42	1	5	0	—		3 (Note: Two appearances in FA Trophy, one in National League playoffs)	0	50	1
Barnet	2024–25	National League	11	0	1	0	—		0	0	12	0
Barnet	Total		97	2	10	0	0	0	9	0	116	2
Career total			473	11	29	1	2	0	42	2	546	14

== Honours ==
Barnet

- National League: 2024–25
