= Sam Beasant =

English footballer

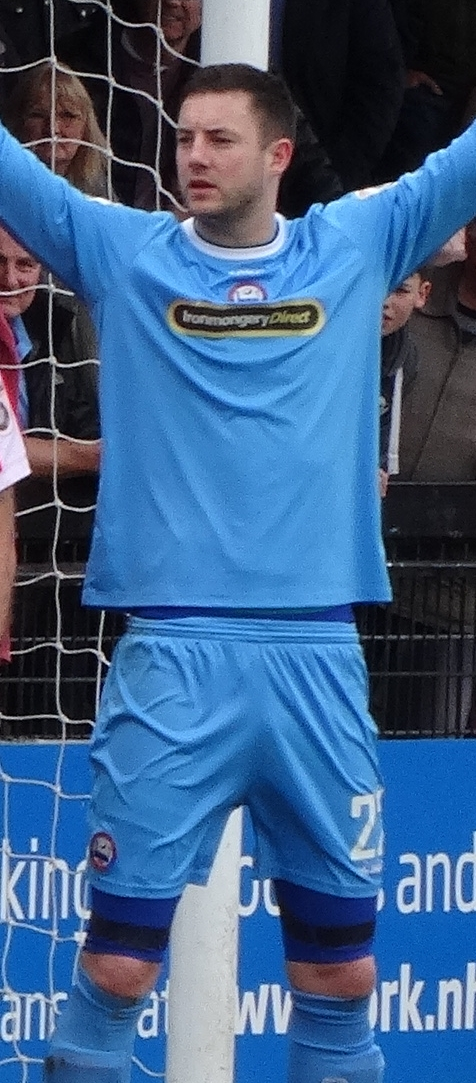
- Beasant playing for Braintree Town in 2017

Personal information
- Full name: Samuel James Beasant
- Date of birth: 8 April 1988 (age 38)
- Place of birth: Denham, England
- Height: 1.96 m (6 ft 5 in)
- Position: Goalkeeper

Team information
- Current team: Hanwell Town

Youth career
- 1998–2003: Chelsea
- 2003–2005: Wycombe Wanderers
- 2007–2009: Olympiakos Nicosia
- 2009–2011: Glenn Hoddle Academy

Senior career*
Years	Team	Apps	(Gls)
2006–2007	Amersham Town	38	(0)
2007–2009	Olympiakos Nicosia	16	(0)
2009	Oxhey Jets		
2010–2012	Maidenhead United	34	(0)
2012	Woking	3	(0)
2012–2013	Billericay Town	17	(0)
2013–2014	Woking	32	(0)
2014–2015	Stevenage	11	(0)
2015–2016	Cambridge United	15	(0)
2016–2017	Braintree Town	28	(0)
2017–2018	Chelmsford City	35	(0)
2018–2019	Concord Rangers	42	(0)
2019–2020	Hemel Hempstead Town	19	(0)
2020–2023	Chesham United	76	(0)
2023	Beaconsfield Town	6	(0)
2023–	Hanwell Town	56	(0)
- * Club domestic league appearances and goals as of 16:26, 21 October 2023 (UTC)

Samuel James Beasant (born 8 April 1988) is an English footballer who plays as a goalkeeper for Hanwell Town.

== Personal life ==
Beasant is the son of former international footballer Dave Beasant, who also played as a goalkeeper.

== Career ==
After leaving Cypriot club Olympiakos Nicosia due to contract issues, he joined the Glenn Hoddle Academy, where his father was a coach. Following an unsuccessful trial with Birmingham City, he joined non-league Maidenhead United in November 2011.

After a successful half-season with the club, he moved onto Woking, but after just three appearances he left for Billericay Town, returning to the Kingfield Stadium ahead of the 2013/14 season.

At the end of the season, he moved up to the Football League with Stevenage. Sharing goalkeeping duties with veteran Chris Day during pre-season, he was chosen ahead of Day in their opening League Two fixture at home to Hartlepool United, keeping a clean sheet in a 1–0 victory.

In July 2015, Beasant signed a one-year deal with Cambridge United. Beasant was released by Cambridge United at the end of the 2015/16 season.

Beasant joined Braintree in the summer of 2016 after rejecting 'numerous' offers from other clubs. He played his first ever FA Cup second-round game on 4 December 2016 against Millwall.

In July 2017, Beasant joined Chelmsford City. After a one-year spell with the Clarets, Beasant made the switch to fellow National League South side Concord Rangers.

After spending the 2019–20 campaign with Hemel Hempstead Town, Beasant joined Chesham United in September 2020.

On 2 June 2023, it was announced Beasant would join Beaconsfield Town ahead of the 2023–24 campaign, following three years at Chesham. He joined Hanwell Town in October 2023. At the end of the 2023/24 season Beasant won the player's player of the year award and supporters player of the year award.

== Career statistics ==
As of 10 February 2025

Appearances and goals by club, season and competition
Club	Season	League			National Cup		League Cup		Other		Total	
Club	Season	Division	Apps	Goals	Apps	Goals	Apps	Goals	Apps	Goals	Apps	Goals
Amersham Town	2006–07	Spartan South Midlands League Division One	No data currently available									
Olympiakos Nicosia	2007–08	Cypriot First Division	No data currently available									
Olympiakos Nicosia	2008–09	Cypriot Second Division	No data currently available									
Oxhey Jets	2009–10	Spartan South Midlands League Premier Division	No data currently available									
Maidenhead United	2011–12	Conference South	7	0	4	0	—		0	0	11	0
Woking	2012–13	Conference Premier	3	0	0	0	—		0	0	3	0
Billericay Town	2012–13	Conference South	17	0	—		—		—		17	0
Woking	2013–14	Conference Premier	32	0	1	0	—		2 (Note: Appearances in the FA Trophy)	0	35	0
Stevenage	2014–15	League Two	8	0	0	0	1	0	0	0	9	0
Cambridge United	2015–16	League Two	15	0	1	0	0	0	1 (Note: Appearances in the Football League Trophy)	0	17	0
Braintree Town	2016–17	National League	28	0	2	0	—		4	0	34	0
Chelmsford City	2017–18	National League South	35	0	5	0	—		2	0	42	0
Concord Rangers	2018–19	National League South	42	0	3	0	—		1	0	46	0
Hemel Hempstead Town	2019–20	National League South	19	0	0	0	—		2	0	21	0
Chesham United	2020–21	Southern League Premier Division South	7	0	1	0	—		4	0	12	0
Chesham United	2021–22	Southern League Premier Division South	39	0	3	0	—		3 (Note: Two appearances in the Southern League Cup, one in the FA Trophy)	0	45	0
Chesham United	2022–23	Southern League Premier Division South	30	0	3	0	—		2	0	35	0
Chesham United	Total		76	0	7	0	—		9	0	92	0
Beaconsfield Town	2023–24	Southern League Premier Division South	6	0	2	0	—		0	0	8	0
Hanwell Town	2023–24	Southern League Premier Division South	26	0	—		—		0	0	26	0
Hanwell Town	2024-25	Southern League Premier Division South	24	0	6	0	—		0	0	30	0
Career total			290	0	25	0	1	0	21	0	391	0
