= Joseph N'Guessan =

English association football player

Personal information
- Full name: Joseph David Ruhemann N'Guessan
- Date of birth: 15 July 1995 (age 31)
- Place of birth: Lewisham, England
- Height: 1.75 m (5 ft 9 in)
- Position: Forward

Youth career
- Glebe
- –2011: Bromley
- 2011–2012: Stevenage
- 2015–2016: Queens Park Rangers

Senior career*
Years	Team	Apps	(Gls)
2012–2015	Stevenage	9	(1)
2012	→ Farnborough (loan)	1	(0)
2012	→ Biggleswade Town (loan)	1	(0)
2013	→ Banbury United (loan)	2	(1)
2013	→ Corby Town (loan)	5	(0)
2013	→ St Neots Town (loan)	1	(0)
2013–2014	→ Arlesey Town (loan)	12	(7)
2014–2015	→ Aldershot Town (loan)	18	(2)
2015	→ St Albans City (loan)	5	(1)
2015–2016	Queens Park Rangers	0	(0)
2016–2017	Maidstone United	3	(0)
2017–2020	Cray Valley Paper Mills		
- * Club domestic league appearances and goals

Joseph David Ruhemann N'Guessan (born 15 July 1995) is an English former professional footballer who played as a forward.

N'Guessan began his career in the youth systems of Glebe and Bromley before joining the Stevenage academy in 2011. During the 2012–13 season, he gained first-team experience through loan spells at Farnborough, Biggleswade Town, Banbury United, and Corby Town. He made his senior debut for Stevenage in April 2013 and signed his first professional contract with the club two months later. The following season included further loans to St Neots Town and Arlesey Town. N'Guessan also scored his first Football League goal for Stevenage in April 2014.

Ahead of the 2014–15 season, N'Guessan joined Aldershot Town on loan, later spending time with St Albans City before being released by Stevenage in May 2015. He subsequently signed for Queens Park Rangers' development squad for the 2015–16 season. After his release from QPR in 2016, he had a brief spell with Maidstone United before joining Cray Valley Paper Mills in August 2017. At Cray Valley, he played regularly, contributing to the club's promotion in the 2018–19 season, before injury curtailed his first-team involvement.

== Club career ==
=== Stevenage ===
N'Guessan played for Glebe at youth level before moving to Bromley and subsequently joining the Stevenage academy. Early in the 2012–13 season, he joined Conference South club Farnborough on a one-month loan, making a single appearance as a substitute in a 3–0 home defeat to Welling United on 15 September 2012. He later had further short-term loans at Biggleswade Town, Banbury United, and Corby Town to gain first-team experience. N'Guessan scored on his debut for Banbury in a 2–0 away victory over Chippenham Town on 26 January 2013, and made a total of five appearances during his final loan spell of the season at Corby.

N'Guessan returned to Stevenage towards the end of the 2012–13 season, making his first-team debut as a 57th-minute substitute in a 2–0 defeat to Milton Keynes Dons at Broadhall Way on 27 April 2013. He signed his first professional contract, a one-year deal, on 13 June 2013. In October 2013, he joined St Neots Town on a one-month loan, scoring on his debut in a 5–0 victory over Hitchin Town and making four appearances in total. He subsequently joined Southern League Premier Division club Arlesey Town in December 2013, managed by former Queens Park Rangers defender Rufus Brevett. After scoring six goals in his first six matches, including two braces, his loan was extended for a further month. N'Guessan made 13 appearances for Arlesey, scoring eight goals, before returning to Stevenage, where he scored his first goal for the club in a 3–2 win against Walsall on 26 April 2014.

Ahead of the 2014–15 season, N'Guessan joined Conference Premier club Aldershot Town on loan until January 2015. He made his debut as a 68th-minute substitute in a 3–1 victory over Altrincham on 9 August 2014, scoring twice in 19 appearances during the spell. After returning to Stevenage, he made three substitute appearances in League Two before joining Conference South club St Albans City on 23 March 2015 for the remainder of the season, scoring once in five matches. N'Guessan was released by Stevenage following the expiry of his contract in May 2015.

=== Queens Park Rangers ===
Following his release from Stevenage, N'Guessan signed a one-year contract with Championship club Queens Park Rangers on 15 June 2015 and was assigned to the club's Elite Development Squad. QPR director of football Les Ferdinand stated that N'Guessan had been "identified with the future in mind". Persistent injuries restricted his progress during the 2015–16 season, and he was released at its conclusion.

=== Maidstone United ===
After leaving Queens Park Rangers, N'Guessan spent a trial period with Scottish Premiership club Kilmarnock, but was not offered a contract. He signed for Maidstone United of the National League in December 2016 on the recommendation of manager Jay Saunders. N'Guessan made three substitute appearances for the club, debuting in a 1–1 draw against Dover Athletic on 26 December 2016, before being released on 31 January 2017. Saunders later stated that he had intended to retain N'Guessan but was unable to do so following the arrival of striker Joe Pigott.

=== Cray Valley Paper Mills ===
N'Guessan joined Southern Counties East Premier Division club Cray Valley Paper Mills on 27 August 2017. The 2017–18 campaign marked his first sustained spell of regular first-team football, during which he scored 10 goals in 35 appearances. He remained with the club for the 2018–19 season, scoring 13 goals in 27 appearances as Cray Valley won the league and reached the 2019 FA Vase final, which he missed through injury sustained in a match against his former club Glebe. Manager Kevin Watson described N'Guessan as "a massive part of the club over the last 18 months," adding that the PFA had agreed to fund his operation. N'Guessan did not feature during the 2019–20 season and was listed among the club's injured players in January 2020.

== Career statistics ==
Appearances and goals by club, season and competition
Club	Season	League			FA Cup		EFL Cup		Other		Total	
Club	Season	Division	Apps	Goals	Apps	Goals	Apps	Goals	Apps	Goals	Apps	Goals
Stevenage	2012–13	League One	1	0	0	0	0	0	0	0	1	0
Stevenage	2013–14	League One	5	1	0	0	0	0	0	0	5	1
Stevenage	2014–15	League Two	3	0	0	0	0	0	0	0	3	0
Stevenage	Total		9	1	0	0	0	0	0	0	9	1
Farnborough (loan)	2012–13	Conference South	1	0	1	0	—		0	0	2	0
Biggleswade Town (loan)	2012–13	Southern League Division One Central	1	0	0	0	—		0	0	1	0
Banbury United (loan)	2012–13	Southern League Premier Division	2	1	0	0	—		1 (Note: Appearance in Oxfordshire Senior Cup)	0	3	1
Corby Town (loan)	2012–13	Conference North	5	0	0	0	—		0	0	5	0
St Neots Town (loan)	2013–14	Southern League Premier Division	1	0	0	0	—		3 (Note: Two appearances in FA Trophy; one appearance and one goal in Southern League Cup)	1	4	1
Arlesey Town (loan)	2013–14	Southern League Premier Division	12	7	0	0	—		1 (Note: Appearance in Bedfordshire Senior Cup)	1	13	8
Aldershot Town (loan)	2014–15	Conference Premier	18	2	1	0	—		0	0	19	2
St Albans City (loan)	2014–15	Conference South	5	1	0	0	—		0	0	5	1
Maidstone United	2016–17	National League	3	0	0	0	—		0	0	3	0
Cray Valley Paper Mills	2017–18	Southern Counties East Premier Division	Season statistics incomplete									
Cray Valley Paper Mills	2018–19	Southern Counties East Premier Division	Season statistics incomplete									
Cray Valley Paper Mills	2019–20	Isthmian League South East Division	Season statistics not known									
Career total			57	12	2	0	0	0	5	2	64	14

== Honours ==
Cray Valley Paper Mills

- Southern Counties East Premier Division: 2018–19
