= Connor Calcutt =

English footballer

Personal information
- Full name: Connor Calcutt
- Date of birth: 10 October 1993 (age 33)
- Place of birth: Watford, England
- Position: Forward

Team information
- Current team: Leighton Town

Youth career
- ?–2011: Hemel Hempstead Town

Senior career*
Years	Team	Apps	(Gls)
2011–2014	Berkhamsted	70	(6)
2014	→ St Albans City (dual reg.)	1	(1)
2014–2015	Stevenage	8	(1)
2014	→ Wealdstone (loan)	3	(0)
2015–2016	Wealdstone	8	(0)
2015–2016	→ Dunstable Town (dual reg.)	29	(1)
2016	Kings Langley	0	(0)
2016	Dunstable Town	2	(1)
2016–2017	Barton Rovers	33	(3)
2017–2018	Farnborough	34	(2)
2018–2019	Hendon	40	(4)
2019–	Bedford Town	9	(1)
2020	→ Eynesbury Rovers (dual reg.)	3	(1)
2020–	Leighton Town	8	(1)
- * Club domestic league appearances and goals as of 11:33, 17 January 2021 (UTC)

Connor Calcutt (born 10 October 1993) is an English footballer who plays as a forward for Spartan South Midlands League Premier Division club Leighton Town.

After playing youth football with Hemel Hempstead Town, Calcutt started his senior career at Berkhamsted. After a dual registration period at St. Albans City, Calcutt signed for League Two side Stevenage in August 2014. Calcutt moved to Wealdstone on loan but suffered a leg break during his loan spell and was released by Stevenage at the end of the season. He went on to have spells with Wealdstone, Dunstable Town, Kings Langley, Barton Rovers, Farnborough, Hendon, Bedford Town, Eynesbury Rovers and Leighton Town.

== Early career ==
Calcutt was born in Watford.

== Career ==
=== Early career ===
Having been on the books of Hemel Hempstead Town as a youth player, Calcutt began his senior career with Berkhamsted, where he quickly gained a reputation as an exciting prospect, producing a 2013-14 tally of 41 goals from 52 appearances in all competitions. In the second half of that season, he joined St. Albans City as a dual-registration player, but only turned out for the side on one occasion. Towards the end of the season, he had a trial with Millwall.

=== Stevenage ===
Calcutt joined League Two club Stevenage on trial terms ahead of the 2014–15 season before signing a professional contract with Stevenage on 9 August, making his Football League debut that same day as a late substitute at home to Hartlepool United. Stevenage won the game 1–0. Calcutt's first professional goal came in only his second League appearance away at Plymouth Argyle in a 1–1 draw, where he came on at half time for the injured Darius Charles. Calcutt moved on a month's loan to Conference South side Wealdstone on 24 October 2014. He scored a brace on his debut for Wealdstone the following day in a 6–0 Middlesex Senior Cup win over Hampton & Richmond Borough. However, the striker suffered a leg break in their 2–0 win at Chelmsford City on 18 November 2014, ruling him out for what was initially estimated to be three months, but later thought to be eight to ten months. He was released by Stevenage at the end of the season.

=== Non-league football ===
In the summer of 2015, Calcutt returned to Wealdstone on a permanent basis. In October 2015 he signed on dual-registration at Southern Football League side Dunstable Town. After scoring 10 in 29 appearances at Dunstable Town, Calcutt signed for newly promoted Southern League Premier Division side Kings Langley in June 2016. However, Calcutt would begin the new season with Barton Rovers. He scored 28 goals in 33 league matches but left the club in summer 2017 to join Farnborough. He signed for Hendon for an undisclosed fee in October 2018.

At the end of November 2019, Calcutt moved to Bedford Town. During 2020, Calcutt also played for Eynesbury Rovers on a dual registration. Calcutt signed for Spartan South Midlands League Premier Division side Leighton Town in summer 2020.

== Career statistics ==
As of 17 January 2021

Appearances and goals by club, season and competition
Club	Season	League			FA Cup		League Cup		Other		Total	
Club	Season	Division	Apps	Goals	Apps	Goals	Apps	Goals	Apps	Goals	Apps	Goals
Berkhamsted	2011–12	Spartan South Midlands League Premier Division	11	6	0	0	—		0	0	11	6
Berkhamsted	2012–13	Spartan South Midlands League Premier Division	27	8	5	2	—		7	7	39	17
Berkhamsted	2013–14	Spartan South Midlands League Premier Division	32	23	3	3	—		17	15	52	41
Berkhamsted	Total		70	37	8	5	0	0	24	22	102	64
St Albans City (dual reg.)	2013–14	Southern League Premier Division	1	0	0	0	—		0	0	1	0
Stevenage	2014–15	League Two	8	1	0	0	1	0	1	0	10	1
Wealdstone (loan)	2014–15	Conference South	3	0	0	0	—		1	2	4	2
Wealdstone	2015–16	National League South	8	0	2	0	—		1	5	11	5
Dunstable Town (dual reg.)	2015–16	Southern League Premier Division	29	10	0	0	—		2	0	31	10
Dunstable Town	2016–17	Southern League Premier Division	2	0	0	0	—		0	0	2	0
Barton Rovers	2016–17	Southern League Division One Central	33	28	3	2	—		7	1	43	31
Farnborough	2017–18	Southern League Premier Division	32	12	1	0	—		6	2	39	14
Farnborough	2018–19	Southern League Premier Division South	9	2	2	2	—		1	0	12	4
Farnborough	Total		41	14	3	2	0	0	7	2	51	18
Hendon	2018–19	Southern League Premier Division South	27	7	0	0	—		3	1	30	8
Hendon	2019–20	Southern League Premier Division South	13	3	3	1	—		5	2	21	6
Hendon	Total		40	10	3	1	0	0	8	3	51	14
Bedford Town	2019–20	Southern League Division One Central	9	1	0	0	—		1	0	10	1
Eynesbury Rovers (dual reg.)	2019–20	Spartan South Midlands League Premier Division	3	0	0	0	—		1	0	4	0
Leighton Town	2020–21	Spartan South Midlands League Premier Division	8	4	2	0	—		0	0	10	4
Career total			255	105	21	10	1	0	53	35	330	150
