= Michael Richens =

English footballer

Personal information
- Full name: Michael Keith Richens
- Date of birth: 21 February 1995 (age 31)
- Place of birth: Bedford, England
- Height: 1.78 m (5 ft 10 in)
- Position: Defender

Team information
- Current team: St Ives Town

Youth career
- 2012–2014: Peterborough United

Senior career*
Years	Team	Apps	(Gls)
2014–2015	Peterborough United	0	(0)
2013	→ Histon (loan)	8	(2)
2013	→ Nuneaton Town (loan)	4	(0)
2013–2014	→ Whitehawk (loan)	3	(0)
2014	→ Bishop's Stortford (loan)	20	(3)
2014	→ Stevenage (loan)	0	(0)
2014–2015	→ Farnborough (loan)	24	(3)
2015	Stevenage	2	(0)
2015	→ Farnborough (loan)	20	(3)
2015–2016	Hemel Hempstead Town	38	(3)
2015–2016	→ Kettering Town (loan)	4	(0)
2015–2016	Bishop's Stortford	14	(0)
2017	Biggleswade Town	8	(1)
2017–2021	Kettering Town	103	(6)
2019	→ Nuneaton Borough (loan)	8	(1)
2021–	St Ives Town	13	(2)
- * Club domestic league appearances and goals as of 09:58, 5 January 2022 (UTC)

Michael Keith Richens (born 21 February 1995) is a professional footballer who plays as defender for Kettering Town.

== Club career ==
Richens joined Nuneaton Town of the Football Conference on a one-month loan on 12 September 2013, where he made four appearances.

He joined Stevenage with Peterborough teammate Tom Conlon on loan on 13 September 2014 until January 2015, with a view to a permanent deal and made his Football League debut for Stevenage on 16 September 2014, in an away League Two match against Bury at Gigg Lane.

He then joined Nuneaton Borough on loan., making ten appearances in all competitions before leaving the club in November 2019 and returning to Kettering.

On 26 July 2021, he stepped down a division to sign for Southern Football League Premier Division Central side St Ives Town, with manager Ricky Marheineke describing Richens as a "National League standard player".
