= 2013–14 Stevenage F.C. season =

Stevenage
2013–14 season
- Chairman: Phil Wallace
- Manager: Graham Westley
- League One: 24th
- FA Cup: Fourth Round
- League Cup: Second Round
- Top goalscorer: League: François Zoko (10); All: François Zoko (16)
- Highest home attendance: 6,913 (v Everton, FA Cup, 25 January 2014)
- Lowest home attendance: 1,970 (v Crewe Alexandra, League One, 25 February 2014)

The 2013–14 season was Stevenage F.C.'s fourth season in the Football League, where the club competed in League One. This article shows statistics of the club's players in the season, and also lists all matches that the club played in the season. Their 18th-place finish during the 2012–13 campaign meant it would be Stevenage's third season of playing in League One, having only spent three years as a Football League club.

== Squad details ==
Last updated on 3 August 2013.

=== Players information ===
No.	Name	Nationality	Position	Date of birth (age)	Signed from	Notes
Goalkeepers
1	Steve Arnold	(England)	GK	22 August 1989 (age 37)	Wycombe Wanderers	
16	Chris Day	(England)	GK	28 July 1975 (age 51)	Millwall	
Defenders
3	Lee Hills	(England)	LB	3 April 1990 (age 36)	Crystal Palace	
4	Ben Chorley	(England)	CB	30 September 1982 (age 43)	Leyton Orient	
5	Jon Ashton	(England)	CB	4 October 1982 (age 43)	Grays Athletic	
6	Luke Jones	(England)	CB	10 April 1987 (age 39)	Mansfield Town	
9	Darius Charles	(England)	LB	10 December 1987 (age 38)	Ebbsfleet United	
22	David Gray	(Scotland)	RB	4 May 1988 (age 38)	Preston North End	
29	Peter Hartley	(England)	CB	3 April 1988 (age 38)	Hartlepool United	
Midfielders
2	Sam Wedgbury	(England)	CM	26 February 1989 (age 37)	Macclesfield Town	
7	Filipe Morais	(Portugal)	RM	21 November 1985 (age 40)	Oldham Athletic	
8	James Dunne	(England)	CM	18 September 1989 (age 36)	Exeter City	
13	Dean Parrett	(England)	CM	16 November 1991 (age 34)	Tottenham Hotspur	
14	Simon Heslop	(England)	CM	1 May 1987 (age 39)	Oxford United	
15	Luke Freeman	(England)	LM	22 March 1992 (age 34)	Arsenal	
17	Greg Tansey	(England)	CM	21 November 1988 (age 37)	Inverness Caledonian Thistle	
20	Jimmy Smith	(England)	RM	7 January 1987 (age 39)	Leyton Orient	
32	Robin Shroot	(Northern Ireland)	RM	26 March 1988 (age 38)	Birmingham City	
Forwards
10	Jordan Burrow	(England)	FW	12 September 1992 (age 33)	Morecambe	
11	Lucas Akins	(England)	FW	25 February 1989 (age 37)	Tranmere Rovers	
12	François Zoko	(Ivory Coast)	FW	13 September 1983 (age 42)	Notts County	
21	Oumare Tounkara	(France)	FW	25 May 1990 (age 36)	Bristol Rovers	
34	Roarie Deacon	(England)	FW	12 October 1991 (age 34)	Sunderland	

=== Management ===
- Manager: Graham Westley
- Assistant manager: Dino Maamria
- Coach: Jason Goodliffe

== Match results ==
=== Legend ===
Win	Draw	Loss

=== Pre-season ===
In June 2013, Stevenage announced that their pre-season campaign would consist of five friendlies to prepare for the 2013–14 season. Two days later, on 20 June, slight amendments were made to the list, with the club facing Championship side Watford at Broadhall Way on 20 July, instead of a trip to Chelmsford City as originally scheduled. One further fixture was added in early July, with a Manchester United XI visiting Broadhall Way on 26 July. Ahead of the pre-season campaign, the team travelled to La Manga in Spain to take part in a four-day training camp.

The club opened the pre-season schedule with a behind-closed-doors friendly against newly promoted League Two side Mansfield Town, winning 5–2 courtesy of goals from Filipe Morais, Dani López, Robin Shroot and a brace from Roarie Deacon. Two days later, Stevenage travelled to another newly promoted team, this time Biggleswade Town of the Southern League Premier Division. The game ended 6–0 in Stevenage's favour, with strikers Oumare Tounkara and Dani López both scoring two apiece, and midfielders Luke Freeman and Matt Ball also netting. The club's first home fixture of pre-season took place on 16 July, entertaining a Queens Park Rangers XI at Broadhall Way. Stevenage won the match 2–0 courtesy of first-half goals from Greg Tansey and Luke Freeman. Back-to-back home defeats to Championship opposition followed. Stevenage's first defeat of pre-season came courtesy of a 2–0 loss to Watford, before a Luke Varney hat-trick gave Leeds United a 3–0 win at Broadhall Way three days later. Three days after the defeat to Leeds, on 26 July, Stevenage entertained a Manchester United XI, with the game ending 2–2 – both of Stevenage's goals coming from Darius Charles after the hosts had trailed by two goals. A day later, the club's pre-season schedule concluded with a 5–0 win at Hitchin Town, with goals coming from Roarie Deacon, Robin Shroot and a Dani López hat-trick.

Game	Date	Opponent	Venue	Result	Attendance	Goalscorers	Notes
1	11 July 2013	Mansfield Town	Neutral	5–2	—	Morais, Deacon (2), López, Shroot	
2	13 July 2013	Biggleswade Town	Away	6–0	550	Freeman, Tounkara (2), López (2), Ball	
3	16 July 2013	Queens Park Rangers XI	Home	2–0	936	Tansey, Freeman	
4	20 July 2013	Watford	Home	0–2			
5	23 July 2013	Leeds United	Home	0–3	2,751		
6	26 July 2013	Manchester United XI	Home	2–2	1,691	Charles (2)	
7	27 July 2013	Hitchin Town	Away	5–0	330	López (3), Deacon, Shroot	

- Note: Stevenage goals come first.

=== League One ===
The 2013–14 League One fixtures were released on 19 June 2013, with Stevenage opening their league campaign at home to Oldham Athletic on 3 August 2013. This meant it was the fifth straight season that Stevenage had opened their campaign with a home fixture. The game ended 4–3 in Oldham's favour, with six of the seven goals coming in the second-half. Stevenage's Darius Charles gave the home side the lead just before half-time, firing in from close range after Luke Jones' header had rebounded back off the post. The visitors then scored three unanswered times after the interval. The first came courtesy of a James Tarkowski volley from Jose Baxter's inswinging free-kick. Baxter then gave Oldham the lead from the penalty spot, before Cristian Montaño ran the length of the pitch to double their advantage. Stevenage fought back with two goals in seven minutes; new signing Oumare Tounkara squared the ball for Greg Tansey to finish from six yards out, and then Filipe Morais levelled after beating the offside trap following Tansey's floated free-kick. With just three minutes remaining, Baxter scored his second goal from the penalty spot after Charles was adjudged to have handled the ball when blocking Charlie MacDonald's shot, with the goal ensuring the three points went the way of the visitors. A second league defeat followed a week later, with the club losing 1–0 to Swindon Town at the County Ground, courtesy of Massimo Luongo's 25-yard first-half strike. A week later, Stevenage fell to their third consecutive league defeat, a 1–0 home defeat to Leyton Orient, with a Kevin Lisbie header settling the match in the first-half. Following three successive league defeats by a one-goal margin, Stevenage secured their first league win of the season on 24 August, winning 1–0 away at Notts County. The only goal of the game came in injury-time, with James Dunne firing home following good work from Robin Shroot down the left wing. A 1–1 home draw against Bradford City was Stevenage's last game in August. Greg Tansey gave Stevenage the lead from the penalty spot midway through the first-half. Bradford equalised three minutes after the interval through Kyel Reid's curling free kick.

Stevenage made it three unbeaten when they drew 0–0 away at Tranmere Rovers on 7 September. The run came to an end the following week when the club fell to a 3–0 defeat to Preston North End at Deepdale. In what was Graham Westley's first return to the club that sacked him seven months earlier, Preston took the lead in first-half injury-time through Paul Huntington's header. Former Stevenage player, Scott Laird, then doubled the home side's advantage, before he provided the third goal late-on when he crossed the ball to Kevin Davies, who was on hand to slide the ball home from an acute angle. Stevenage then lost 3–1 at home to Carlisle United on 21 September. The away side took a one-goal lead into the break courtesy of a close range Lee Miller strike, before Stevenage responded through a Greg Tansey penalty after Luke Freeman had been fouled in the area. Carlisle retook the lead with just ten minutes remaining when Matty Robson fired home a left-footed shot, before David Amoo secured the win five minutes later following a late counterattack. Another heavy loss followed a week later, this time a 4–1 away defeat at the hands of Milton Keynes Dons. MK Dons were three goals to the good after just 23 minutes, before a Darren Potter own goal reduced the deficit just before the interval. There was to be no second-half comeback, and MK Dons restored their three-goal cushion with a Shaun Williams penalty on the hour mark. This meant that Stevenage had now conceded ten goals in their last three games.

October began with a fourth straight league defeat, a 1–0 home loss to Coventry City. The only goal of the game came after half-an-hour, with Leon Clarke latching onto Robin Shroot's misguided backpass to make no mistake from inside the area. Stevenage secured their first home league victory of the season in their following match, on 12 October, with a 2–1 win over Brentford. After trailing early-on from a close range Clayton Donaldson goal, Stevenage responded through two quickfire François Zoko goals. The first of which came when Zoko, making his league debut for the club, pounced on goalkeeper David Button's error to level, before the same man turned in the rebound after Jordan Burrow's initial shot had been saved. A week later, Stevenage narrowly lost away at Walsall, losing 2–1. François Zoko scored Stevenage's goal, a late consolation strike after Walsall had earned a commanding lead courtesy of goals either side of the half-time interval. Just three days later, on 22 October, Stevenage earned a convincing 3–0 away victory over Crewe Alexandra. All three goals came in the opening 20 minutes of the match. Filipe Morais opened the scoring when he latched onto François Zoko's knock down to finish calmly. Just two minutes later, Stevenage had doubled their advantage, this time through Luke Freeman's driven effort from a tight angle. Morais then scored his second of the match when he collected the ball outside the area and curled a shot past Steve Phillips in the Crewe goal. Stevenage secured back-to-back league wins for the first time in the season when they defeated Crawley Town 2–0 at Broadhall Way on 26 October. A powerful header from defender Peter Hartley gave the home side the lead after just eight minutes, before Michael Doughty doubled their advantage in injury-time with a left-footed shot that crept into the corner of the goal.

Game	Date	Opponent	Venue	Result	Attendance	Goalscorers	Notes
1	3 August 2013	Oldham Athletic	Home	3–4	3,009	Charles, Tansey, Morais	
2	10 August 2013	Swindon Town	Away	0–1	7,133	—	
3	17 August 2013	Leyton Orient	Home	0–1	3,262	—	
4	24 August 2013	Notts County	Away	1–0	3,925	Dunne	
5	31 August 2013	Bradford City	Home	1–1	3,242	Tansey (pen)	
6	7 September 2013	Tranmere Rovers	Away	0–0	4,156	—	
7	14 September 2013	Preston North End	Away	0–3	8,855	—	
8	21 September 2013	Carlisle United	Home	1–3	2,526	Tansey (pen)	
9	28 September 2013	Milton Keynes Dons	Away	1–4	7,770	Potter (o.g)	
10	5 October 2013	Coventry City	Home	0–1	3,325	—	
11	12 October 2013	Brentford	Home	2–1	3,225	Zoko (2)	
12	19 October 2013	Walsall	Away	1–2	3,720	Zoko	
13	22 October 2013	Crewe Alexandra	Away	3–0	3,682	Morais (2), Freeman	
14	26 October 2013	Crawley Town	Home	2–0	2,804	Hartley, Doughty	
15	2 November 2013	Wolverhampton Wanderers	Away	0–2	17,700	—	
16	16 November 2013	Rotherham United	Home	0–3	2,814	—	
17	23 November 2013	Peterborough United	Away	1–0	5,707	Akins	
18	26 November 2013	Gillingham	Away	2–3	4,591	Heslop, Zoko	
19	30 November 2013	Shrewsbury Town	Home	1–3	2,675	Zoko	
20	14 December 2013	Port Vale	Away	2–2	4,967	Burrow (2)	
21	21 December 2013	Sheffield United	Home	0–0	3,003	—	
22	26 December 2013	Colchester United	Away	0–4	3,919	—	
23	29 December 2013	Bristol City	Away	1–4	12,038	Zoko	
24	11 January 2014	Oldham Athletic	Away	0–1	3,460	—	
25	14 January 2014	Swindon Town	Home	2–0	2,167	Akins, Morais (pen)	
26	18 January 2014	Notts County	Home	0–1	2,877	—	
27	4 February 2014	Gillingham	Home	3–1	2,399	Zoko (pen), Charles (2)	
28	15 February 2014	Rotherham United	Away	1–2	7,393	Zoko	
29	18 February 2014	Leyton Orient	Away	0–2	4,171	—	
30	22 February 2014	Peterborough United	Home	0–1	4,262	—	
31	25 February 2014	Crewe Alexandra	Home	1–0	1,970	Zoko	
32	1 March 2014	Bradford City	Away	3–2	13,033	Zoko, Freeman (2)	
33	4 March 2014	Crawley Town	Away	1–1	2,936	Dembélé	
34	8 March 2014	Tranmere Rovers	Home	3–1	2,577	Smith, Charles, Mousinho	
35	11 March 2014	Preston North End	Home	1–1	2,448	Smith	
36	15 March 2014	Carlisle United	Away	0–0	3,672	—	
37	22 March 2014	Milton Keynes Dons	Home	2–3	3,027	Parrett, Akins	
38	26 March 2014	Coventry City	Away	0–1	1,697	—	
39	29 March 2014	Port Vale	Home	1–1	2,912	Hartley	
40	1 April 2014	Wolverhampton Wanderers	Home	0–0	4,660	—	
41	5 April 2014	Shrewsbury Town	Away	0–1	5,178	—	
42	12 April 2014	Colchester United	Home	2–3	3,108	Doughty, Freeman	
43	18 April 2014	Sheffield United	Away	0–1	17,629	—	
44	21 April 2014	Bristol City	Home	1–3	2,901	Freeman	
45	26 April 2014	Walsall	Home	3–2	2,973	Smith, N'Guessan, Freeman	
46	3 May 2014	Brentford	Away	0–2	11,393	—	

- Note: Stevenage goals come first.

==== League table ====
Pos	Team	Pld	W	D	L	GF	GA	GD	Pts	Promotion, qualification or relegation
20	Notts County	46	15	5	26	64	77	−13	50	
21	Tranmere Rovers (R)	46	12	11	23	52	79	−27	47	Relegation to Football League Two
22	Carlisle United (R)	46	11	12	23	43	76	−33	45	Relegation to Football League Two
23	Shrewsbury Town (R)	46	9	15	22	44	65	−21	42	Relegation to Football League Two
24	Stevenage (R)	46	11	9	26	46	72	−26	42	Relegation to Football League Two

Updated to match(es) played on 3 May 2014. Source: BBC Sport
Rules for classification: 1) Points; 2) Goal difference; 3) Number of goals scored
(R) Relegated

=== League Cup ===
First Round fixtures for the competition were released on 17 June 2013, with Stevenage being drawn at home to Championship opposition in the form of Ipswich Town. The match, played on 6 August, ended 2–0 in Stevenage's favour, the club's first competitive victory of the season. Both goals came in the second-half, the first coming from the penalty spot after Oumare Tounkara had been fouled in the area; with the resultant spot-kick being converting by Filipe Morais. Debutant Jordan Burrow doubled Stevenage's lead, sliding in from close range following good work from Robin Shroot and Simon Heslop down the right hand side. The victory meant Stevenage had progressed to the Second Round of the competition for only the second time in their history. Two days later, on 8 August, the draw for the next round was made, with the club being dealt their first ever away tie in the League Cup, facing Premier League side Everton at Goodison Park.

The club's tie against Everton took place on 28 August, narrowly falling to a 2–1 defeat after extra-time. Stevenage took the lead ten minutes before half-time when Luke Freeman was on hand to score from close range after the Everton defence had failed to clear Oumare Tounkara's cross. The Premier League outfit equalised in first-half injury-time when Gerard Deulofeu jinked his way into the box before calmly stroking the ball into the bottom corner of the goal. Both teams had chances to win the tie in normal time, but it was ultimately Marouane Fellaini who won it for Everton in extra-time, capitalising on a defensive mistake to score from six yards out.

Game	Date	Opponent	Venue	Result	Attendance	Goalscorers	Notes
1	6 August 2013	Ipswich Town	Home	2–0		Morais (pen), Burrow	
2	28 August 2013	Everton	Away	1–2 (a.e.t.)	22,730	Freeman	

- *Note: Stevenage goals come first.

=== FA Cup ===
Game	Date	Opponent	Venue	Result	Attendance	Goalscorers	Notes
1	9 November 2013	Portsmouth	Home	2–1	2,829	Zoko (2)	
2	7 December 2013	Stourbridge	Home	4–0	2,160	Zoko, Akins, Freeman, Morais (pen)	
3	4 January 2014	Doncaster Rovers	Away	3–2	3,899	Zoko, Hartley, Charles	
4	25 January 2014	Everton	Home	0–4	6,913		

- Note: Stevenage goals come first.

=== Football League Trophy ===
Stevenage were awarded a bye to the Second Round of the Football League Trophy. This is because the competition is split into Northern and Southern sections, with eight clubs in each section bypassing the First Round draw. The Second Round draw was made on 7 September 2013, with the club being drawn at home against fellow League One side Milton Keynes Dons. The match was played just over a month after the draw was made, on 8 October, with Stevenage securing a 2–1 victory courtesy of a second-half comeback. Milton Keynes had taken the lead midway through the first-half when Shaun Williams converted from the penalty spot. A debut goal from striker François Zoko restored parity in the match shortly after the interval, with the Ivorian poking in Michael Doughty's initial effort. Stevenage then turned the match on its head when Zoko's cross was handled in the area, with Filipe Morais scoring the subsequent spot-kick.

Game	Date	Opponent	Venue	Result	Attendance	Goalscorers	Notes
2	8 October 2013	Milton Keynes Dons	Home	2–1	1,456	Zoko, Morais (pen)	
QFS	12 November 2013	Leyton Orient	Home	3–2	1,532	Zoko, Akins, Morais (pen)	
SFS	6 November 2013	Swindon Town	Away	1–1 (p)	3,804	Zoko	

- Note: Stevenage goals come first.

== Season statistics ==
Last updated on 22 October 2013.

=== Starts and goals ===
No.	Pos	Nat	Player	Total		League One		FA Cup		League Cup		FL Trophy	
No.	Pos	Nat	Player	Apps	Goals	Apps	Goals	Apps	Goals	Apps	Goals	Apps	Goals
1	GK	(England) ENG	Steve Arnold	4	0	2+1	0	0	0	1	0	0	0
2	MF	(England) ENG	Sam Wedgbury	19	0	5+8	0	0+2	0	1	0	0+3	0
5	DF	(England) ENG	Jon Ashton	46	0	38	0	4	0	2	0	2	0
6	DF	(England) ENG	Luke Jones	29	0	18+4	0	4	0	0+1	0	2	0
7	MF	(Portugal) POR	Filipe Morais	33	8	18+7	4	4	1	1	1	3	2
8	MF	(England) ENG	James Dunne	14	1	6+7	1	0	0	1	0	0	0
9	DF	(England) ENG	Darius Charles	25	5	16+5	4	1+1	1	2	0	0	0
10	FW	(England) ENG	Jordan Burrow	21	3	8+10	2	0+1	0	1	1	0+1	0
11	FW	(England) ENG	Lucas Akins	32	5	22+4	3	3	1	0	0	2+1	1
12	FW	(Ivory Coast) CIV	François Zoko	37	16	30	10	4	4	0	0	3	2
13	MF	(England) ENG	Dean Parrett	16	1	8+4	1	1+2	0	0	0	1	0
14	MF	(England) ENG	Simon Heslop	31	1	20+3	1	3	0	1+1	0	3	0
15	MF	(England) ENG	Luke Freeman	48	5	39	3	4	1	2	1	3	0
16	GK	(England) ENG	Chris Day	46	0	38	0	4	0	1	0	3	0
18	MF	(Northern Ireland) NIR	Matt Ball	0	0	0	0	0	0	0	0	0	0
19	FW	(Canada) CAN	Marcus Haber	5	0	1+2	0	1	0	0+1	0	0	0
20	MF	(England) ENG	Jimmy Smith	43	2	34+2	2	3	0	1	0	3	0
21	FW	(France) FRA	Oumare Tounkara	17	0	6+9	0	0	0	1+1	0	0	0
22	DF	(Scotland) SCO	David Gray	12	0	9+2	0	0	0	1	0	0	0
23	FW	(Spain) ESP	Dani López	4	0	1+3	0	0	0	0	0	0	0
24	MF	(Wales) WAL	Michael Doughty	38	1	25+6	1	3	0	1	0	3	0
25	DF	(England) ENG	George Allen	0	0	0	0	0	0	0	0	0	0
25	MF	(Portugal) POR	Bruno Andrade	19	0	3+10	0	1+3	0	0	0	0+2	0
28	MF	(England) ENG	Joseph N'Guessan	1	0	0+1	0	0	0	0	0	0	0
29	DF	(England) ENG	Peter Hartley	34	3	25+2	2	3	1	1	0	3	0
30	DF	(Cyprus) CYP	Anthony Furlonge	0	0	0	0	0	0	0	0	0	0
32	MF	(Northern Ireland) NIR	Robin Shroot	12	0	6+4	0	0	0	1+1	0	0	0
34	FW	(England) ENG	Roarie Deacon	25	0	11+10	0	0+2	0	1	0	1	0
35	DF	(England) ENG	Jhai Singh Dhillon	0	0	0+0	0	0	0	0	0	0	0
			Curtis Obeng	10	0	10	0	0	0	0	0	0	0
			Anderson Banvo	1	0	0+1	0	0	0	0	0	0	0
			Bira Dembele	10	1	10	1	0	0	0	0	0	0
Players who left the club before the end of the season
3	DF	(England) ENG	Lee Hills	5	0	3+1	0	0	0	1	0	0	0
4	DF	(England) ENG	Ben Chorley	0	0	0	0	0	0	0	0	0	0
13	FW	(Ireland) EIR	Don Cowan	2	0	0+1	0	0	0	0	0	0+1	0
17	MF	(England) ENG	Greg Tansey	18	3	11+4	3	0+1	0	1+1	0	0	0

- Note: '+' denotes appearance as a substitute.
- Note: Herts Senior Cup games and statistics not included.

== Transfers ==
=== In ===
Pos	Player	From	Fee	Date	Notes
MF	Simon Heslop	Oxford United	Free Transfer	21 May 2013	
DF	Luke Jones	Mansfield Town	Free Transfer	21 May 2013	
FW	Oumare Tounkara	Bristol Rovers	Free Transfer	21 May 2013	
MF	Sam Wedgbury	Macclesfield Town	Free Transfer	21 May 2013	
FW	Jordan Burrow	Morecambe	Free Transfer	31 May 2013	
MF	Jimmy Smith	Leyton Orient	Free Transfer	10 June 2013	
DF	Peter Hartley	Hartlepool United	Undisclosed	7 August 2013	
FW	Don Cowan	Southend United	Free Transfer	28 September 2013	
FW	François Zoko	Notts County	Free Transfer	4 October 2013	
MF	Dean Parrett	Tottenham Hotspur	Free Transfer	17 October 2013	

=== Out ===
Pos	Player	To	Fee	Date	Notes
FW	Patrick Agyemang	Portsmouth	Released	20 May 2013	
DF	Miguel Comminges		Released	20 May 2013	
DF	Andy Iro		Released	20 May 2013	
DF	Bondz N'Gala	Portsmouth	Released	20 May 2013	
DF	Mark Roberts	Fleetwood Town	Free Transfer	3 July 2013	
MF	Anthony Grant	Crewe Alexandra	Free Transfer	15 July 2013	

=== Loans in ===
Pos	Player	From	Date	End date	Notes
MF	Michael Doughty	Queens Park Rangers	16 August 2013		
MF	Bruno Andrade	Queens Park Rangers	4 October 2013		

=== Loans out ===
Pos	Player	To	Date	End date	Notes
FW	Michael Thalassitis	Ebbsfleet United	2 July 2013		
MF	Matt Ball	Boreham Wood	16 August 2013		
DF	Anthony Furlonge	Hayes & Yeading United	16 August 2013		
FW	Marcus Haber	Notts County	13 September 2013		
FW	Dani López	Barnet	10 October 2013		

== See also ==
- 2013–14 in English football
- List of Stevenage F.C. seasons
