= Chris Whelpdale =

English footballer (born 1987)

Personal information
- Full name: Christopher Mark Whelpdale
- Date of birth: 27 January 1987 (age 39)
- Place of birth: Harold Wood, England
- Height: 6 ft 1 in (1.85 m)
- Position: Midfielder

Team information
- Current team: Burgess Hill Town

Youth career
- Norwich City
- Arsenal
- Ipswich Town

Senior career*
Years	Team	Apps	(Gls)
2004–2006	Maldon Town		
2006–2007	Billericay Town	37	(14)
2007–2011	Peterborough United	124	(12)
2010	→ Gillingham (loan)	4	(3)
2011–2014	Gillingham	104	(20)
2014–2016	Stevenage	60	(15)
2016–2017	AFC Wimbledon	17	(1)
2017–2018	Stevenage	27	(1)
2018–2020	Chelmsford City	66	(17)
2020–2023	Eastbourne Borough	62	(18)
2023–2024	Lewes	40	(12)
2024	Whitehawk	8	(1)
2024–	Burgess Hill Town	1	(0)
- * Club domestic league appearances and goals as of 09:42, 20 October 2024 (UTC)

Christopher Mark Whelpdale (born 27 January 1987) is an English professional footballer who plays as a midfielder for Isthmian League Premier Division club Burgess Hill Town.

== Career ==
After playing local football in Brentwood, Whelpdale was recruited by Norwich City's youth academy. Whelpdale later moved to Arsenal and Ipswich Town before being released.

Whelpdale began his senior career at Maldon Town, after not being offered a scholarship by Ipswich, before moving shortly to Billericay Town.

=== Peterborough United ===
In 2007 Whelpdale signed for League Two side Peterborough United, rejecting League One side Southend United, who had just been relegated from the Football League Championship.

=== Gillingham ===
He joined Gillingham on loan in the 2010–11 season and scored three goals in four games for the League Two team. He joined Gillingham on a permanent basis in July 2011. Whelpdale was part of the Gillingham side that won the 2012–13 League Two title.

=== Stevenage ===
He rejected a new deal from Gillingham and signed for League Two side Stevenage on 30 June 2014.

=== AFC Wimbledon ===
On 28 June 2016 Whelpdale signed for League One side AFC Wimbledon. He scored his first goal for Wimbledon in a 3–2 EFL Cup loss against Peterborough United on 9 August 2016.

=== Stevenage ===
On 28 July 2017, Whelpdale re-signed for Stevenage. Whelpdale made 27 League Two appearances, starting 19 times, scoring once, before departing the club.

=== Chelmsford City ===
On 10 August 2018, Whelpdale signed for Chelmsford City. On 27 August 2018, Whelpdale scored his first goal for the club in a 5–3 away win against Hemel Hempstead Town. On 30 January 2020, Whelpdale was confirmed as assistant to interim manager Robbie Simpson alongside Michael Spillane following the sacking of Rod Stringer.

=== Eastbourne Borough ===
On 29 July 2020, Whelpdale left Chelmsford to join fellow National League South club Eastbourne Borough.

=== Lewes ===
On 19 July 2023, Whelpdale signed for Isthmian League Premier Division club Lewes. He scored on his league debut against Cray Wanderers on 12 August.

=== Whitehawk ===
On 17 June 2024, Whelpdale joined fellow Isthmian Premier Division side Whitehawk.

=== Burgess Hill Town ===
On 19 October 2024, Whelpdale joined Isthmian League South East Division club Burgess Hill Town.

== Career statistics ==
As of match played 15 October 2024

Appearances and goals by club, season and competition
Club	Season	League			FA Cup		League Cup		Other		Total	
Club	Season	Division	Apps	Goals	Apps	Goals	Apps	Goals	Apps	Goals	Apps	Goals
Peterborough United	2007–08	League Two	35	3	4	0	2	0	1 (Note: Appearance(s) in EFL Trophy)	0	42	3
Peterborough United	2008–09	League One	38	7	3	0	0	0	1	0	42	7
Peterborough United	2009–10	Championship	29	1	1	0	2	1	0	0	32	2
Peterborough United	2010–11	League One	22	1	1	0	1	0	2 (Note: Appearance(s) in League One play-offs)	0	26	1
Peterborough United	Total		124	12	9	0	5	1	4	0	142	13
Gillingham (loan)	2010–11	League Two	4	3	0	0	0	0	0	0	4	3
Gillingham	2011–12	League Two	39	12	3	0	1	0	1	0	44	12
Gillingham	2012–13	League Two	41	7	1	0	2	0	1	0	45	7
Gillingham	2013–14	League One	24	1	2	0	1	0	1	0	28	1
Gillingham	Gillingham Total		108	23	6	0	4	0	3	0	121	23
Stevenage	2014–15	League Two	39	7	2	0	1	0	3 (Note: Two appearances in League Two play-offs and one in EFL Trophy)	0	45	7
Stevenage	2015–16	League Two	21	8	2	1	0	0	1	0	24	9
Stevenage	Total		60	15	4	1	1	0	4	0	69	16
AFC Wimbledon	2016–17	League One	17	1	3	0	1	1	2	0	23	2
Stevenage	2017–18	League Two	27	1	2	0	1	0	2	0	32	1
Chelmsford City	2018–19	National League South	39	9	1	1	—		4 (Note: Three appearances in Essex Senior Cup and one in National League South play-offs)	0	44	10
Chelmsford City	2019–20	National League South	27	8	1	0	—		5 (Note: Four appearances and one goal in FA Trophy, one appearance in Essex Senior Cup)	1	33	9
Chelmsford City	Total		66	17	2	1	0	0	9	1	77	19
Eastbourne Borough	2020–21	National League South	13	11	4	4	—		0	0	17	15
Eastbourne Borough	2021–22	National League South	29	4	3	0	—		1 (Note: Appearance(s) in National League South play-offs)	0	33	4
Eastbourne Borough	2022–23	National League South	20	3	1	1	—		3 (Note: Two appearances in FA Trophy, one appearance in Sussex Senior Cup)	1	24	5
Eastbourne Borough	Total		62	18	8	5	0	0	4	1	74	24
Lewes	2023–24	Isthmian League Premier Division	40	12	3	2	—		2 (Note: Appearance(s) in FA Trophy)	0	45	14
Whitehawk	2024–25	Isthmian League Premier Division	8	1	0	0	—		1	0	9	1
Career total			518	100	37	9	12	2	31	2	592	113

== Honours ==
Peterborough United

- Football League One play-offs: 2011

Gillingham

- Football League Two: 2012–13

Individual

- National League South Team of the Year: 2018–19
