= List of United Kingdom locations: Bra =

The United Kingdom

This is part of the list of United Kingdom locations: a gazetteer of place names in the United Kingdom showing each place's locality and geographical coordinates.

== Br ==
=== Bra ===
==== Braa-Brad ====
Location	Locality	Coordinates (links to map & photo sources)	OS grid reference
Braaid	Isle of Man	54.15°N 04.57°W	SC3276
Braal Castle	Highland	58.52°N 03.49°W	ND1360
Brabourne	Kent	51.12°N 01.00°E	TR1041
Brabourne Lees	Kent	51.12°N 00.97°E	TR0840
Brabsterdorran	Highland	58.52°N 03.32°W	ND2360
Bracadale	Highland	57.35°N 06.40°W	NG3538
Braceborough	Lincolnshire	52.70°N 00.40°W	TF0813
Bracebridge	Lincolnshire	53.20°N 00.56°W	SK9668
Bracebridge Heath	Lincolnshire	53.19°N 00.53°W	SK9867
Braceby	Lincolnshire	52.90°N 00.49°W	TF0135
Bracewell	Lancashire	53.92°N 02.21°W	SD8648
Bracken Bank	Bradford	53.84°N 01.94°W	SE0439
Brackenber	Cumbria	54.56°N 02.43°W	NY7219
Brackenbottom	North Yorkshire	54.14°N 02.29°W	SD8172
Brackenfield	Derbyshire	53.12°N 01.44°W	SK3759
Brackenhall	Kirklees	53.66°N 01.77°W	SE1519
Brackenhill	Wakefield	53.63°N 01.36°W	SE4216
Bracken Hill	Kirklees	53.68°N 01.72°W	SE1821
Brackenlands	Cumbria	54.81°N 03.16°W	NY2547
Bracken Park	Leeds	53.86°N 01.46°W	SE3541
Brackenthwaite (Westward)	Cumbria	54.80°N 03.10°W	NY2946
Brackenthwaite (Buttermere)	Cumbria	54.58°N 03.31°W	NY1522
Brackenthwaite	North Yorkshire	53.95°N 01.59°W	SE2751
Brackla (Bragle)	Bridgend	51.49°N 03.55°W	SS9279
Bracklesham	West Sussex	50.75°N 00.86°W	SZ8096
Brackley	Northamptonshire	52.02°N 01.15°W	SP5837
Bracknell	Berkshire	51.40°N 00.76°W	SU8668
Brackrevach	Highland	58.54°N 03.61°W	ND0663
Braco	Perth and Kinross	56.25°N 03.89°W	NN8309
Bracon	North Lincolnshire	53.55°N 00.82°W	SE7807
Bracon Ash	Norfolk	52.54°N 01.21°E	TM1899
Bracora / Bracara	Highland	56.96°N 05.76°W	NM7192
Bracorina	Highland	56.96°N 05.75°W	NM7292
Bradaford	Devon	50.72°N 04.28°W	SX3994
Bradbourne	Derbyshire	53.06°N 01.68°W	SK2152
Bradbury	Durham	54.64°N 01.52°W	NZ3128
Bradda East	Isle of Man	54.09°N 04.76°W	SC1970
Bradda Head	Isle of Man	54.09°N 04.76°W	SC193703
Bradda West	Isle of Man	54.09°N 04.76°W	SC1970
Bradden	Northamptonshire	52.12°N 01.06°W	SP6448
Braddock	Cornwall	50.42°N 04.59°W	SX1662
Braddocks Hay	Staffordshire	53.11°N 02.18°W	SJ8857
Bradeley	City of Stoke-on-Trent	53.05°N 02.18°W	SJ8851
Bradeley Green	Cheshire	52.99°N 02.70°W	SJ5344
Bradenham	Buckinghamshire	51.66°N 00.81°W	SU8297
Bradenham	Norfolk	52.63°N 00.83°E	TF9208
Bradenstoke	Wiltshire	51.51°N 02.00°W	SU0079
Brades Village	Sandwell	52.50°N 02.04°W	SO9790
Bradfield	Devon	50.87°N 03.35°W	ST0509
Bradfield	Essex	51.92°N 01.11°E	TM1430
Bradfield	Berkshire	51.44°N 01.13°W	SU6072
Bradfield	Norfolk	52.84°N 01.36°E	TG2733
Bradfield Combust	Suffolk	52.17°N 00.76°E	TL8957
Bradfield Green	Cheshire	53.12°N 02.47°W	SJ6859
Bradfield Heath	Essex	51.91°N 01.09°E	TM1329
Bradfield St Clare	Suffolk	52.17°N 00.77°E	TL9057
Bradfield St George	Suffolk	52.20°N 00.79°E	TL9160
Bradford	Bradford	53.78°N 01.75°W	SE1632
Bradford	Cornwall	50.54°N 04.66°W	SX1175
Bradford	Derbyshire	53.17°N 01.68°W	SK2164
Bradford	Devon	50.84°N 04.24°W	SS4207
Bradford	Manchester	53.47°N 02.21°W	SJ8698
Bradford Abbas	Dorset	50.92°N 02.59°W	ST5814
Bradford Leigh	Wiltshire	51.35°N 02.24°W	ST8362
Bradford-on-Avon	Wiltshire	51.34°N 02.25°W	ST8261
Bradford-on-Tone	Somerset	50.99°N 03.18°W	ST1722
Bradford Peverell	Dorset	50.72°N 02.49°W	SY6592
Bradgate	Rotherham	53.43°N 01.38°W	SK4193
Bradiford	Devon	51.08°N 04.07°W	SS5534
Brading	Isle of Wight	50.67°N 01.15°W	SZ6086
Bradley	Derbyshire	53.01°N 01.67°W	SK2246
Bradley	Gloucestershire	51.63°N 02.36°W	ST7593
Bradley	Hampshire	51.16°N 01.10°W	SU6341
Bradley	Kirklees	53.67°N 01.75°W	SE1620
Bradley	North East Lincolnshire	53.54°N 00.12°W	TA2407
Bradley	North East Lincolnshire	53.53°N 00.13°W	TA2406
Bradley	Staffordshire	52.75°N 02.17°W	SJ8817
Bradley	Wolverhampton	52.55°N 02.07°W	SO9595
Bradley	Wrexham	53.07°N 03.01°W	SJ3253
Bradley Cross	Somerset	51.27°N 02.76°W	ST4753
Bradley Fold	Bolton	53.56°N 02.37°W	SD7508
Bradley Green	Cheshire	53.00°N 02.73°W	SJ5145
Bradley Green	Gloucestershire	51.63°N 02.37°W	ST7493
Bradley Green	Somerset	51.13°N 03.07°W	ST2538
Bradley Green	Warwickshire	52.59°N 01.58°W	SK2800
Bradley Green	Worcestershire	52.24°N 02.03°W	SO9861
Bradley in the Moors	Staffordshire	52.96°N 01.91°W	SK0641
Bradley Mills	Kirklees	53.64°N 01.77°W	SE1517
Bradley Mount	Cheshire	53.29°N 02.13°W	SJ9177
Bradley Stoke	South Gloucestershire	51.52°N 02.54°W	ST6281
Bradlow	Herefordshire	52.03°N 02.42°W	SO7138
Bradmore	Wolverhampton	52.57°N 02.16°W	SO8997
Bradmore	Nottinghamshire	52.87°N 01.13°W	SK5831
Bradney	Somerset	51.13°N 02.95°W	ST3338
Bradney	Shropshire	52.55°N 02.35°W	SO7695
Bradninch	Devon	50.81°N 03.43°W	SS9903
Bradnock's Marsh	Solihull	52.40°N 01.67°W	SP2279
Bradnop	Staffordshire	53.09°N 01.98°W	SK0155
Bradnor Green	Herefordshire	52.20°N 03.04°W	SO2957
Bradpole	Dorset	50.74°N 02.75°W	SY4794
Bradshaw	Calderdale	53.76°N 01.89°W	SE0730
Bradshaw	Kirklees	53.62°N 01.92°W	SE0514
Bradshaw	Bolton	53.60°N 02.40°W	SD7312
Bradshaw	Staffordshire	53.09°N 02.09°W	SJ9455
Bradstone	Devon	50.59°N 04.29°W	SX3880
Bradville	Milton Keynes	52.06°N 00.79°W	SP8341
Bradwall Green	Cheshire	53.16°N 02.37°W	SJ7563
Bradway	Sheffield	53.31°N 01.52°W	SK3280
Bradwell	Devon	51.15°N 04.16°W	SS4942
Bradwell	Milton Keynes	52.04°N 00.79°W	SP8339
Bradwell (Bradwell Juxta Coggeshall)	Essex	51.87°N 00.61°E	TL8023
Bradwell	Derbyshire	53.32°N 01.74°W	SK1781
Bradwell	Staffordshire	53.03°N 02.24°W	SJ8449
Bradwell	Norfolk	52.57°N 01.68°E	TG5004
Bradwell Common	Milton Keynes	52.04°N 00.77°W	SP8439
Bradwell Hills	Derbyshire	53.31°N 01.74°W	SK1780
Bradwell-on-Sea	Essex	51.71°N 00.89°E	TM0006
Bradwell Waterside	Essex	51.72°N 00.88°E	TL9907
Bradworthy	Devon	50.89°N 04.39°W	SS3213

==== Brae-Bram ====
Location	Locality	Coordinates (links to map & photo sources)	OS grid reference
Brae	Shetland Islands	60.39°N 01.34°W	HU3668
Braeface	Falkirk	55.99°N 03.95°W	NS7880
Braefindon	Highland	57.60°N 04.31°W	NH6259
Braegarie	Aberdeenshire	56.98°N 03.48°W	NO1089
Braegrum	Perth and Kinross	56.40°N 03.62°W	NO0025
Braehead	Dumfries and Galloway	54.83°N 04.46°W	NX4252
Braehead	Orkney Islands	59.30°N 02.98°W	HY4447
Braehead (Ayr)	South Ayrshire	55.46°N 04.62°W	NS3422
Braehead (near East Kilbride)	South Lanarkshire	55.76°N 04.24°W	NS5955
Braehead (near Lanark)	South Lanarkshire	55.73°N 03.67°W	NS9550
Braehead	Stirling	56.10°N 03.93°W	NS8092
Braehead of Lunan	Angus	56.65°N 02.52°W	NO6852
Braehoulland	Shetland Islands	60.49°N 01.56°W	HU2479
Braemar	Aberdeenshire	57.00°N 03.41°W	NO1491
Braemore	Highland	58.24°N 03.58°W	ND0730
Brae of Achnahaird	Highland	58.06°N 05.39°W	NC0013
Brae of Pert	Angus	56.77°N 02.59°W	NO6465
Braepark	City of Edinburgh	55.96°N 03.31°W	NT1875
Braeside	Inverclyde	55.93°N 04.83°W	NS2375
Braeside	City of Aberdeen	57.12°N 02.15°W	NJ9104
Braeside	Aberdeenshire	57.43°N 02.16°W	NJ9038
Braes of Coul	Angus	56.69°N 03.19°W	NO2757
Braes of Ullapool	Highland	57.88°N 05.13°W	NH1493
Braeswick	Orkney Islands	59.21°N 02.68°W	HY6137
Braevallich	Argyll and Bute	56.21°N 05.30°W	NM9507
Braewick (West Mainland)	Shetland Islands	60.29°N 01.40°W	HU3357
Braewick (North Mainland)	Shetland Islands	60.48°N 01.56°W	HU2478
Brafferton	Durham	54.58°N 01.55°W	NZ2921
Brafferton	North Yorkshire	54.12°N 01.34°W	SE4370
Brafield-on-the-Green	Northamptonshire	52.21°N 00.80°W	SP8258
Bragar	Western Isles	58.32°N 06.63°W	NB2947
Bragbury End	Hertfordshire	51.87°N 00.17°W	TL2621
Bragenham	Buckinghamshire	51.94°N 00.69°W	SP9028
Bragle (Brackla)	Bridgend	51.49°N 03.55°W	SS9279
Braichmelyn	Gwynedd	53.16°N 04.06°W	SH6265
Braichyfedw	Powys	52.50°N 03.63°W	SN8991
Braidfauld	City of Glasgow	55.84°N 04.18°W	NS6363
Braidley	North Yorkshire	54.21°N 01.95°W	SE0380
Braidwood	South Lanarkshire	55.70°N 03.84°W	NS8447
Bràigh na h-Aoidhe / Branahuie	Western Isles	58.20°N 06.32°W	NB4632
Brailsford	Derbyshire	52.96°N 01.62°W	SK2541
Brailsford Green	Derbyshire	52.96°N 01.62°W	SK2541
Brain's Green	Gloucestershire	51.76°N 02.49°W	SO6608
Braintree	Essex	51.87°N 00.55°E	TL7623
Braiseworth	Suffolk	52.29°N 01.12°E	TM1371
Braishfield	Hampshire	51.02°N 01.47°W	SU3725
Braiswick	Essex	51.89°N 00.87°E	TL9826
Braithwaite	Cumbria	54.59°N 03.19°W	NY2323
Braithwaite	Bradford	53.86°N 01.94°W	SE0441
Braithwaite	Doncaster	53.60°N 01.07°W	SE6112
Braithwell	Doncaster	53.44°N 01.20°W	SK5394
Brake	Shetland Islands	59.91°N 01.34°W	HU3714
Brakefield Green	Norfolk	52.64°N 00.98°E	TG0209
Bramber	West Sussex	50.87°N 00.32°W	TQ1810
Bramblecombe	Dorset	50.79°N 02.32°W	ST7700
Brambridge	Hampshire	50.98°N 01.33°W	SU4721
Bramcote	Warwickshire	52.48°N 01.41°W	SP4088
Bramcote	Nottinghamshire	52.92°N 01.24°W	SK5137
Bramcote Hills	Nottinghamshire	52.93°N 01.24°W	SK5138
Bramcote Mains	Warwickshire	52.47°N 01.41°W	SP4087
Bramdean	Hampshire	51.04°N 01.13°W	SU6128
Bramerton	Norfolk	52.59°N 01.38°E	TG2905
Bramfield	Suffolk	52.30°N 01.51°E	TM4073
Bramfield	Hertfordshire	51.81°N 00.12°W	TL2915
Bramford	Dudley	52.53°N 02.10°W	SO9393
Bramford	Suffolk	52.07°N 01.09°E	TM1246
Bramhall	Stockport	53.35°N 02.16°W	SJ8984
Bramhall Moor	Stockport	53.37°N 02.13°W	SJ9186
Bramhall Park	Stockport	53.37°N 02.18°W	SJ8886
Branham	Leeds	53.88°N 01.36°W	SE4243
Bramhope	Leeds	53.88°N 01.62°W	SE2543
Bramley	Surrey	51.18°N 00.57°W	TQ0044
Bramley	Hampshire	51.32°N 01.06°W	SU6559
Bramley	Leeds	53.80°N 01.63°W	SE2434
Bramley	Rotherham	53.42°N 01.27°W	SK4892
Bramley	Derbyshire	53.30°N 01.40°W	SK4079
Bramley Corner	Hampshire	51.32°N 01.09°W	SU6359
Bramley Green	Hampshire	51.31°N 01.05°W	SU6658
Bramley Head	North Yorkshire	54.01°N 01.81°W	SE1258
Bramley Vale	Derbyshire	53.18°N 01.31°W	SK4666
Bramling	Kent	51.26°N 01.18°E	TR2256
Brampford Speke	Devon	50.77°N 03.53°W	SX9298
Brampton	Cambridgeshire	52.31°N 00.24°W	TL2070
Brampton	Suffolk	52.37°N 01.56°E	TM4381
Brampton (Eden)	Cumbria	54.60°N 02.51°W	NY6723
Brampton (Carlisle)	Cumbria	54.94°N 02.75°W	NY5261
Brampton	Lincolnshire	53.30°N 00.74°W	SK8479
Brampton	Derbyshire	53.22°N 01.46°W	SK3670
Brampton	Norfolk	52.76°N 01.28°E	TG2224
Brampton Abbotts	Herefordshire	51.93°N 02.58°W	SO6026
Brampton Ash	Northamptonshire	52.47°N 00.83°W	SP7987
Brampton Bierlow	Rotherham	53.50°N 01.38°W	SE4101
Brampton Bryan	Herefordshire	52.34°N 02.92°W	SO3772
Brampton en le Morthen	Rotherham	53.38°N 01.27°W	SK4888
Brampton Park	Cambridgeshire	52.31°N 00.24°W	TL2070
Brampton Street	Suffolk	52.37°N 01.55°E	TM4281
Bramshall	Staffordshire	52.89°N 01.91°W	SK0633
Bramshaw	Hampshire	50.93°N 01.61°W	SU2715
Bramshill	Hampshire	51.34°N 00.93°W	SU7461
Bramshott	Hampshire	51.08°N 00.80°W	SU8432
Bramwell	Somerset	51.05°N 02.81°W	ST4329

==== Bran-Braz ====
Location	Locality	Coordinates (links to map & photo sources)	OS grid reference
Branault	Highland	56.74°N 06.05°W	NM5269
Branbridges	Kent	51.20°N 00.38°E	TQ6748
Brancaster	Norfolk	52.95°N 00.63°E	TF7743
Brancaster Staithe	Norfolk	52.96°N 00.66°E	TF7944
Brancepeth	Durham	54.72°N 01.65°W	NZ2237
Branch End	Northumberland	54.94°N 01.90°W	NZ0661
Branchton	Inverclyde	55.93°N 04.81°W	NS2475
Brand End	Lincolnshire	52.98°N 00.03°E	TF3745
Branderburgh	Moray	57.72°N 03.29°W	NJ2371
Brandesburton	East Riding of Yorkshire	53.90°N 00.31°W	TA1147
Brandeston	Suffolk	52.19°N 01.27°E	TM2460
Brand Green	Herefordshire	52.06°N 02.35°W	SO7641
Brand Green	Gloucestershire	51.95°N 02.37°W	SO7428
Brandhill	Shropshire	52.39°N 02.85°W	SO4278
Brandis Corner	Devon	50.80°N 04.25°W	SS4103
Brandish Street	Somerset	51.20°N 03.57°W	SS9046
Brandiston	Norfolk	52.74°N 01.15°E	TG1321
Brandlingill	Cumbria	54.62°N 03.36°W	NY1226
Brandon	Suffolk	52.44°N 00.61°E	TL7886
Brandon	Warwickshire	52.38°N 01.41°W	SP4076
Brandon	Durham	54.74°N 01.64°W	NZ2339
Brandon	Lincolnshire	53.02°N 00.65°W	SK9048
Brandon Bank	Cambridgeshire	52.46°N 00.38°E	TL6288
Brandon Creek	Cambridgeshire	52.49°N 00.35°E	TL6091
Brandon Parva	Norfolk	52.62°N 01.05°E	TG0707
Brandsby	North Yorkshire	54.14°N 01.11°W	SE5872
Brands Hill	Berkshire	51.48°N 00.54°W	TQ0177
Brandwood	Shropshire	52.82°N 02.78°W	SJ4726
Brandwood End	Birmingham	52.40°N 01.89°W	SP0779
Brandy Carr	Wakefield	53.70°N 01.54°W	SE3023
Brandy Hole	Essex	51.62°N 00.62°E	TQ8295
Brandy Wharf	Lincolnshire	53.45°N 00.48°W	TF0196
Brane	Cornwall	50.09°N 05.63°W	SW4028
Bran End	Essex	51.89°N 00.39°E	TL6525
Branksome	Poole	50.72°N 01.93°W	SZ0592
Branksome	Darlington	54.53°N 01.59°W	NZ2616
Branksome Park	Poole	50.70°N 01.93°W	SZ0590
Bransbury	Hampshire	51.17°N 01.40°W	SU4242
Bransby	Lincolnshire	53.30°N 00.66°W	SK8979
Branscombe	Devon	50.68°N 03.14°W	SY1988
Bransford	Worcestershire	52.16°N 02.30°W	SO7952
Bransgore	Hampshire	50.77°N 01.74°W	SZ1897
Branshill	Clackmannan	56.12°N 03.80°W	NS8894
Branson's Cross	Worcestershire	52.32°N 01.88°W	SP0870
Branston	Lincolnshire	53.19°N 00.47°W	TF0267
Branston	Staffordshire	52.78°N 01.67°W	SK2221
Branston	Leicestershire	52.85°N 00.79°W	SK8129
Branston Booths	Lincolnshire	53.20°N 00.41°W	TF0669
Branstone	Isle of Wight	50.64°N 01.22°W	SZ5583
Bransty	Cumbria	54.55°N 03.59°W	NX9719
Brant Broughton	Lincolnshire	53.07°N 00.64°W	SK9154
Brantham	Suffolk	51.96°N 01.05°E	TM1034
Branthwaite (Calderdale)	Cumbria	54.72°N 03.10°W	NY2937
Branthwaite (Allerdale)	Cumbria	54.60°N 03.47°W	NY0524
Branthwaite Edge	Cumbria	54.60°N 03.47°W	NY0524
Brantingham	East Riding of Yorkshire	53.74°N 00.57°W	SE9429
Branton	Northumberland	55.43°N 01.93°W	NU0416
Branton	Doncaster	53.50°N 01.03°W	SE6401
Branton Green	North Yorkshire	54.05°N 01.32°W	SE4462
Branxholme	Scottish Borders	55.39°N 02.85°W	NT4611
Branxton	Northumberland	55.62°N 02.17°W	NT8937
Brascote	Leicestershire	52.61°N 01.35°W	SK4402
Brassey Green	Cheshire	53.13°N 02.71°W	SJ5260
Brassington	Derbyshire	53.08°N 01.65°W	SK2354
Brasted	Kent	51.27°N 00.10°E	TQ4755
Brasted Chart	Kent	51.25°N 00.09°E	TQ4653
Brathay	Cumbria	54.41°N 03.00°W	NY366033
Brathens	Aberdeenshire	57.07°N 02.54°W	NO6798
Bratoft	Lincolnshire	53.15°N 00.19°E	TF4764
Brattle	Kent	51.06°N 00.76°E	TQ9433
Brattleby	Lincolnshire	53.30°N 00.59°W	SK9480
Bratton	Shropshire	52.72°N 02.54°W	SJ6314
Bratton	Somerset	51.20°N 03.51°W	SS9446
Bratton	Wiltshire	51.26°N 02.13°W	ST9152
Bratton Clovelly	Devon	50.69°N 04.18°W	SX4691
Bratton Fleming	Devon	51.11°N 03.94°W	SS6437
Bratton Seymour	Somerset	51.05°N 02.47°W	ST6729
Braughing	Hertfordshire	51.89°N 00.01°E	TL3924
Braughing Friars	Hertfordshire	51.89°N 00.04°E	TL4124
Braunston	Northamptonshire	52.28°N 01.20°W	SP5466
Braunstone	Leicestershire	52.61°N 01.18°W	SK5502
Braunston-in-Rutland	Rutland	52.64°N 00.77°W	SK8306
Braunton	Devon	51.10°N 04.17°W	SS4836
Brawby	North Yorkshire	54.19°N 00.88°W	SE7378
Brawith	North Yorkshire	54.45°N 01.23°W	NZ5007
Bray	Berkshire	51.50°N 00.70°W	SU9079
Braybrooke	Northamptonshire	52.44°N 00.88°W	SP7684
Braydon Side	Wiltshire	51.56°N 01.98°W	SU0185
Brayford	Devon	51.09°N 03.88°W	SS6834
Brayfordhill	Devon	51.09°N 03.88°W	SS6834
Brays Grove	Essex	51.75°N 00.11°E	TL4608
Bray Shop	Cornwall	50.54°N 04.35°W	SX3374
Braystones	Cumbria	54.43°N 03.54°W	NY0005
Brayswick	Worcestershire	52.13°N 02.26°W	SO8249
Braythorn	North Yorkshire	53.93°N 01.63°W	SE2449
Brayton	North Yorkshire	53.76°N 01.09°W	SE6030
Braytown	Dorset	50.67°N 02.24°W	SY8386
Braywick	Berkshire	51.50°N 00.71°W	SU8979
Braywoodside	Berkshire	51.46°N 00.74°W	SU8775
Brazacott	Cornwall	50.69°N 04.46°W	SX2691
Brazenhill	Staffordshire	52.78°N 02.20°W	SJ8621
