= Braehead (disambiguation) =

Braehead is a commercial development in Renfrew, Scotland.

Braehead may also refer to:

- Braehead, Banchory, a proposed housing development in Aberdeenshire, Scotland
- Braehead, Dumfries and Galloway, a location
- Braehead, Orkney, a location
- Braehead, Ayr, South Ayrshire, a location
- Braehead, South Lanarkshire, three villages and hamlets in South Lanarkshire, Scotland
  - Braehead, East Kilbride, a location
  - Braehead, Lanark, a location
- Braehead, Stirling, a location
- Braehead (Fredericksburg, Virginia), an American historic house
