= Bradney =

Bradney may refer to:

== People with the surname ==
- James Henry Bradney (1853–1936), a Member of Parliament in New Zealand
- Sir Joseph Alfred Bradney (1859–1933), British soldier and historian noted for his History of Monmouthshire

== Places ==
- Bradney, Shropshire, a location in England
- Bradney, Somerset, a hamlet within the parish of Bawdrip, England
