= Knayton =

Village in North Yorkshire, England

Coordinates: 54.285650°N 1.337200°W

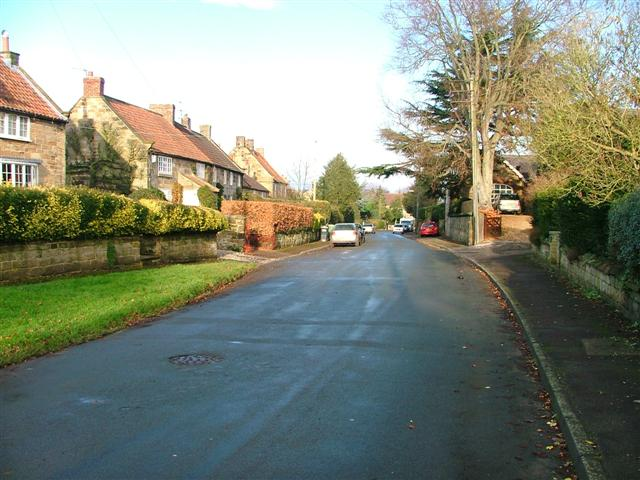
- Street in Knayton

- Location within North Yorkshire
- OS grid reference: SE432879
- Civil parish: Knayton with Brawith
- Unitary authority: North Yorkshire
- Ceremonial county: North Yorkshire
- Region: Yorkshire and the Humber
- Country: England
- Sovereign state: United Kingdom
- Post town: THIRSK
- Postcode district: YO7
- Dialling code: 01845
- Police: North Yorkshire
- Fire: North Yorkshire
- Ambulance: Yorkshire

Knayton is a small village in North Yorkshire, England. It is located north of Thirsk just off the A19. It is linked with the hamlet of Brawith, approximately 1-mile (1.6 km) away to the west.

== History ==
The village is mentioned in the Domesday Book as having four households, 100 acres (40 ha) of meadowland, and 75 ploughlands. The name of the village derives from an Old English personal name (Cēngifu), and the Old English word tūn meaning town. The Dog and Gun public house faces the village green and the village hall, whilst the village school, Knayton Church of England Academy, is on the western side of the A19. The school was rated as Outstanding by Ofsted in 2017, and again under another inspection in 2022.

There is also a caravan park and bus stop but no scheduled public service, just buses for schoolchildren. Knayton is also the home of The Hillside Rural Activities Park (HRAP) with a cricket pitch, three tennis courts, two football pitches, and is the home of Borrowby show. In 2012 The Willowman Festival was held on the park. There is no church in the village, the nearest is at Leake, further north along the A19.

Knayton forms part of the civil parish of Knayton with Brawith. At the 2001 Census, the parish had a population of 326, dropping to 318 at the 2011 Census. In 2015, North Yorkshire County Council estimated the population of the village and parish to be 310. The village is part of the Thirsk and Malton Constituency.

From 1974 to 2023 it was part of the Hambleton District, it is now administered by the unitary North Yorkshire Council.

== See also ==
- Listed buildings in Knayton with Brawith
