= Phil Wallace =

British businessman

Phil Wallace BEM
- Born: Phillip Owen Wallace; 22 October 1949 (age 76); Walthamstow
- Occupation: Businessman
- Known for: Owner and chairman of Stevenage F.C.

Phillip Owen Wallace BEM (born 22 October 1949) is a British businessman and owner and chairman of EFL League One association football club Stevenage F.C.

== Business interests ==
Phil Wallace is the CEO of Lamex Food Group, a global food trading company with 21 offices in 16 countries. He joined in 1972 when the company, then known as L+M Foods, was a small food importer based in London. He became a director in 1975 and was appointed managing director and majority shareholder in the early 1980s. Since then the company has added offices around the world and the continuing growth in the Group lead to a US$50 million management buyout in 2006, with Phil Wallace still retaining a significant holding in the newly formed parent, Lamex Food Group. He continues to lead the Group from his bases in the UK and US. He was a director of The Football Conference for five years and served as Vice Chairman for two years, resigning his position in 2006 to concentrate on his US business interests.

== Chairman of Stevenage F.C. ==
In 1999, he purchased a 90% holding in Stevenage F.C. after it was reported that the club were days from closing. Since then the club's finances have been rebuilt and the stadium improved to a 7,100 capacity. The improvements implemented by Wallace included a new £600,000 stand opening, and work on a new £2.5 million training facility was announced for nearby Shephalbury Park - which subsequently opened in 2002. The club also continued to improve on the pitch under Wallace's chairmanship. During the 2001–02 season, Stevenage reached the FA Trophy final at Villa Park, but lost 2–0 in the final. Wallace continued to run a tight ship as Stevenage showed signs of gradual improvement. Stevenage became the first side to win a competitive final at the new Wembley Stadium in May 2007; winning 3–2 in the final in front of a competition record crowd of 53,262. This success was repeated again in 2009, when Stevenage Borough defeated York City in the final 2–0. In 2010, they competed in the FA Trophy final at Wembley Stadium once again.

The following year, on 17 April 2010, Stevenage were promoted to the Football League for the first time in the club's history with two games to spare. Promotion was secured thanks to a 2–0 win at Kidderminster Harriers. The title win subsequently meant that Wallace was a chairman of a Football League club for the first time during the club's 2010–11 campaign. It also backed Wallace's controversial decision to bring manager Graham Westley back for a second spell at the club. The success continued in the club's first Football League season, with Stevenage earning back-to-back promotions following a successful play-off campaign. Stevenage beat Torquay United 1–0 at Old Trafford in the final to secure promotion. During the same season, Stevenage also reached the Fourth Round of the FA Cup – beating Premier League side Newcastle United at Broadhall Way in the previous round.

The 2011–12 season brought continued success; with Stevenage reaching the League One play-off places despite their limited resources. The club ultimately lost in the two-legged play-off semi-finals, losing 1–0 to Sheffield United. Wallace brought in new manager Gary Smith in January 2012, following Westley's departure to Preston North End, and Smith guided Stevenage to the Fifth Round of the FA Cup. The club took Premier League side Tottenham Hotspur to a replay, before losing 3–1 at White Hart Lane. Wallace revealed that the capital earned from the Tottenham games "will hasten the club's development, but will not change future plans". Wallace announced in June 2011 that the club had secured a lease on a 40-acre former sports ground in Bragbury End – with the intention of developing the site into a new training complex. Wallace continued adding income generating assets to the club, purchasing a children's nursery in 2014 which was moved to a new build facility at the club's Shephalbury training ground in 2015. In 2018 the club began work on a new £1.5m North Stand, after securing the first ever Bond Issue in English football with fans contributing £600,000 towards the build by way of a 5-year loan. The stand is opened in 2019.

Wallace was awarded the British Empire Medal in the 2020 Birthday Honours.
