= Listed buildings in Knayton with Brawith =

Knayton with Brawith is a civil parish in the county of North Yorkshire, England. It contains 15 listed buildings that are recorded in the National Heritage List for England. Of these, one is listed at Grade II*, the middle of the three grades, and the others are at Grade II, the lowest grade. The parish contains the village of Knayton, the hamlet of Brawith, and the surrounding countryside. Most of the listed buildings are houses and cottages in the village of Knayton, and the others consist of a large house and its stable block, and two bridges.

== Key ==
Grade	Criteria
II*	Particularly important buildings of more than special interest
II	Buildings of national importance and special interest

== Buildings ==
Name and location	Photograph	Date	Notes	Grade
Sundial Cottage; 54.28604°N 1.33510°W	—	17th century	The house has two storeys and four bays, and a swept pantile roof with raised verges, stone coping and shaped kneelers. The central doorway has a chamfered quoined surround and a Tudor arched chamfered lintel. The windows are double-chamfered horizontally-sliding sashes. Above the doorway is a sundial dated 1699, and to its left is a fire window with an oculus above.	II
Swan Lane House; 54.28309°N 1.33796°W	—	17th century (probable)	The house is in sandstone on a chamfered plinth, with stepped eaves, and a swept pantile roof with stone coping and shaped kneelers. There are two storeys and two bays. The doorway has a chamfered architrave and a chamfered lintel. Some windows are mullioned, and others are later casements.	II
Hamilton House; 54.28486°N 1.33772°W	—	Late 17th century (probable)	A house and a cottage in sandstone on a chamfered plinth, with a pantile roof, a raised verge, stone coping and a shaped kneeler on the left gable, and coping on the right. There are two storeys and three bays. On the front are two doorways with lintels, the left chamfered. There is one sash window in the upper floor, and the other windows date from the 20th century.	II
Brawith Hall; 54.27948°N 1.37120°W		Early 18th century	A large house in red and pale brown brick, with sandstone dressings, a hipped Westmorland slate roof, two storeys and attics. The south front has five bays on a stone plinth, with giant pilasters and a parapet. It has a chamfered floor band, a moulded cornice with a pulvinated frieze over the ground floor, and a cornice under the parapet. Steps lead up to the central doorway that has an eared architrave, and a pediment containing a pulvinated frieze on consoles. The windows are sashes in architraves, with coved lintels and chamfered sills, the window above the doorway with a rusticated surround. The east and west fronts have four bays.	II*
Moor House; 54.28611°N 1.33478°W	—	Mid 18th century	A cottage in sandstone, with stepped eaves, and a swept pantile roof with raised verges, stone coping and shaped kneelers, with a catslide at the rear. There are two storeys and three bays. In the centre is a gabled porch and a doorway. In the ground floor are bow windows, and the upper floor contains horizontally-sliding sashes with keystones.	II
Stable block, Brawith Hall; 54.27980°N 1.37137°W	—	Mid to late 18th century	The stable block is in red-brown brick on a plinth, with stone dressings, quoins, a modillion cornice, and a hipped Welsh slate roof. There is a single storey, and three bays, the middle bay projecting slightly under a pediment with a clock. The bay contains a doorway with a Gibbs surround flanked by sash windows. The outer bays also contain sash windows, and all the windows have gauged flat arches and keystones. In the centre of the roof is a cupola with a weathervane.	II
Brewers Cottage, Pear Tree Cottage and Ramblers Cottage; 54.28444°N 1.33762°W	—	Mid to late 18th century	The cottages are in sandstone, and the roofs have raised verges, stone coping and shaped kneelers. There are two storeys, and each cottage has two bays. Pear Tree Cottage, on the left, has a roof of pantile, a porch and casement windows. The other cottages have a tile roof, central doorways with splayed lintels, and the windows are horizontally-sliding sashes, those in the ground floor with splayed lintels.	II
Chapel House; 54.28573°N 1.33528°W	—	Mid to late 18th century	The cottage is in sandstone, with a projecting eaves band, and a tile roof with raised verges, stone coping and shaped kneleers. There are two storeys, three bays, and a rear brick outshut. The central doorway has a three-part lintel with a keystone, and the windows are casements with flat arches, those in the ground floor with splayed voussoirs.	II
Hamwood Cottage; 54.28600°N 1.33529°W	—	Mid to late 18th century	The cottage is in sandstone, and has a pantile roof with raised verges, stone coping and shaped kneelers. There are two storeys and two bays. In the centre is a gabled porch, and the windows are casements, those in the ground floor with keystones.	II
South End; 54.28426°N 1.33762°W	—	Mid to late 18th century	The cottage is in sandstone, and has a stepped eaves band, and a swept pantile roof with stone coping and shaped kneelers. There are two storeys and three bays. The doorway is in the centre, the windows date from the 20h century, and have splayed lintels, incised as voussoirs in the ground floor, and with keystones in the upper floor.	II
Turpins Lodge; 54.28596°N 1.33543°W	—	Mid to late 18th century	The cottage is in sandstone, with stepped eaves, and a tile roof with stone coping and shaped kneelers. There are two storeys and two bays, and the entrance is in the gable end. The windows date from the 20th century and have fixed lights.	II
Broad Beck Bridge; 54.29088°N 1.34032°W		Late 18th century	The bridge carries Oaktree Bank over Broad Beck. It is in stone, and consists of a single segmental arch with voussoirs. The bridge has a pilaster on each side, a band, and a plain coped parapet.	II
Swan Lane Cottage; 54.28299°N 1.33797°W	—	Late 18th century	The house is in sandstone, with stepped eaves, and a tile roof with stone coping and a shaped kneeler on the left. There are two storeys and three bays, and a single-storey single-bay on the left. On the front is a doorway, and casement windows in architraves.	II
South Fields; 54.28419°N 1.33765°W	—	Late 18th to early 19th century	The cottage is in sandstone, with quoins, and a pantile roof with stone coping and shaped kneelers on the left. There are two storeys and two bays. Steps lead up to the central doorway, and the windows are casements with stone lintels and projecting sills.	II
Brawith Bridge; 54.27477°N 1.37281°W		Early 19th century	The bridge carries a road over Cod Beck. It is in sandstone, and has a round central arch and narrower outer arches. Below the parapet is a projecting band.	II
