= British Timken Athletic F.C. =

Defunct English football club

British Timken Athletic
- Full name: British Timken Athletic Football Club
- Founded: 1961; 64 years ago
- Dissolved: 1990; 35 years ago
- Ground: Braunston Road; Daventry
- League: United Counties League

British Timken Athletic F.C. was a football club based in Daventry, Northamptonshire, England.

== History ==
=== 1960s ===
British Timken Athletic was formed in 1961 and joined the United Counties League Division Two during the 1961–62 season, where they finished as league runners-up. They then won the league in the following season to secure promotion to the United Counties League Division One, which they were later relegated from during the 1966–67 season.

=== 1970s ===
During the 1972–73 season, Division Two was renamed to Division One and this season saw their highest league finish, with British Timken Athletic finishing second out of twenty clubs.

They then entered the FA Vase for the first time during the 1976–77 season, losing 5–0 to Rothwell Town in the extra preliminary round. They entered into the FA Vase one more time, during the 1977–78 season, where they lost again in the extra preliminary round 6–0 against Northfield Town.

=== 1980s ===
In the 1980–81 season, British Timken Athletic recorded an 11–1 home loss against Stevenage Borough (and also a 2–1 away loss), and they then saw a short period of relative success between 1981 and 1984, when British Timken Athletic recorded two fourth-place league finishes (1981–82, 1983–84) and one fifth-place league finish (1982–83).

After 1984, British Timken Athletic were unable to finish above tenth place in the United Counties League, and they last played during the 1989–90 season.

=== 1990s ===
Before the start of the 1990–91 season, British Timken Athletic dissolved in 1990.

== Records ==
- Best league performance: Second in United Counties League Division One (1972–73)
- Best FA Vase performance: Extra preliminary round, 1976–77, 1977–78
- Record league win: Unknown
- Record league defeat: 1–11 against Stevenage Borough, 6 December 1980

== Honours ==
- United Counties League Division Two
  - Winners (1) – 1962–63
  - Runners-up (1) – 1961–62
- United Counties League Division One
  - Runners-up (1) – 1972–73
