= Stevenage F.C. =

Association football club in Stevenage, England

Stevenage
- Full name: Stevenage Football Club
- Nickname: The Boro
- Founded: 1976; 50 years ago (as Stevenage Borough F.C.)
- Ground: Broadhall Way
- Capacity: 7,318
- Owner: Phil Wallace (91%)
- Chairman: Phil Wallace
- Manager: Alex Revell
- League: EFL League One
- 2025–26: EFL League One, 6th of 24
- Website: stevenagefc.com
Home colours	Away colours	Third colours

Stevenage Football Club (known as Stevenage Borough Football Club until 2010) is a professional association football club based in Stevenage, Hertfordshire, England. The club competes in EFL League One, the third tier of the English football league system, and plays its home matches at Broadhall Way.

Founded in 1976 following the demise of Stevenage Athletic, the club joined the United Counties League in 1980 and won the United Counties League Division One title and the United Counties League Cup in its first season at senior level. Following three promotions in four seasons in the early 1990s, Stevenage reached the Conference National in 1994. They won the division in the 1995–96 season but were denied promotion to the Football League because Broadhall Way did not meet the required ground standards. Stevenage remained in the top division of non-League football for the following 14 seasons, before winning the Conference Premier in the 2009–10 season to earn promotion to the Football League.

The club dropped 'Borough' from its name in June 2010, ahead of its first season in the Football League, in which Stevenage won promotion to League One via the play-offs. After three seasons in League One, the club was relegated to League Two in 2014. Stevenage returned to League One following promotion during the 2022–23 season and recorded their joint-highest league finish in 2025–26, when they placed sixth, matching their position in the 2011–12 season.

Stevenage has also won the FA Trophy twice, defeating Kidderminster Harriers in the 2007 final to become the first club to win a competitive final at the new Wembley Stadium, before winning the competition again in 2009. The club has also recorded notable FA Cup results against higher-level opposition.

== History ==
=== 1976–2010 ===
Stevenage Borough was formed in 1976 following the bankruptcy of Stevenage Athletic. Chairman Keith Berners, along with "a number of like-minded volunteers", were tasked with arranging a team to play Hitchin Town Youth at Broadhall Way in November 1976, as a "curtain-raiser" for the new club. However, the Broadhall Way pitch was subsequently dug up for non-footballing purposes after Stevenage Borough Council sold the land to a local businessman, who dug a trench across the full length of the pitch to ensure that no football was played. Consequently, the new club began playing in the Chiltern Youth League on a roped-off pitch at the town's King George V playing fields and subsequently moved up to intermediate status, joining the Wallspan Southern Combination shortly after. Stevenage Borough Council granted consent for the club to incorporate the name "Borough" in their title and to adopt the town's civic emblem as the club badge. In 1980, the council reacquired the lease for Broadhall Way and permitted the football club to become its tenant. With the council as their landlords and a refurbished stadium, Stevenage Borough attained senior status, under the management of Derek Montgomery, and joined the United Counties Football League in the same year. The club's first competitive league match was a 3–1 victory against ON Chenecks on 16 August 1980, played in front of 421 spectators. In their first season as a senior club, the team won the United Counties League Division One championship, scoring 106 goals. The club also won the United Counties League Cup during the same season.

After three successive seasons in the United Counties Premier Division, the club joined Division Two North of the Isthmian League in 1984, and the following season earned promotion to Isthmian League Division One after finishing the season as champions. Two years later, the club was relegated back to Division Two North, having finished second from bottom of the division. Brian Williams was tasked with steadying the club following the relegation; he was appointed as manager in July 1988. He spent two full seasons in charge, guiding Stevenage to two fourth-place finishes. Paul Fairclough was appointed as the club's manager in June 1990 and he would ultimately guide the team to four league titles in eight years. The club secured promotion during the 1990–91 season, Fairclough's first season in charge, winning 34 of their 42 games. The league triumph included winning every home match, scoring 122 goals and amassing 107 points. The following season, Stevenage won the Isthmian League Division One title, remaining unbeaten at home for the second consecutive season, and were promoted to the Isthmian League Premier Division. A third promotion in four years followed at the end of the 1993–94 season, as Stevenage earned promotion to the Football Conference after winning the Isthmian League Premier Division. Two seasons later, Stevenage won the Conference, but were denied promotion to the Football League due to insufficient ground facilities, thereby reprieving Torquay United, who had finished in last place in Division Three. During the same season, the club reached the first round of the FA Cup for the first time, losing 2–1 to Hereford United of the Third Division at Edgar Street.

A chart of Stevenage's final table positions in the football league since 1994.

The 1996–97 season marked the club's first progression to the third round of the FA Cup, following a 2–1 victory against Leyton Orient at Brisbane Road. They were subsequently drawn against Birmingham City at Broadhall Way, but due to ground issues, the tie was relocated to St Andrew's, where Birmingham won 2–0. The following season, the club reached the fourth round, drawing Premier League club Newcastle United at Broadhall Way. A temporary stand was erected behind the South Stand, which was allocated to the Newcastle supporters, increasing the stadium capacity to 9,000, sufficient to meet the Football Association's requirements. Stevenage held Newcastle to a 1–1 draw, with Giuliano Grazioli equalising after Alan Shearer had given Newcastle an early lead. Stevenage lost 2–1 in the replay at St James' Park, a goal from Alan Shearer that appeared not to have crossed the line, proved decisive. Despite earning significant revenue from the two respective cup runs, the club faced financial difficulties. Chairman Victor Green announced his intention to close the club down if no buyer was found. Phil Wallace purchased the club and set about rebuilding its finances and its relationship with the local council.

During the 2001–02 season, the club reached the FA Trophy final for the first time, losing 2–0 to Yeovil Town at Villa Park. The following season, Stevenage were positioned in last place of the Conference National in January, seven points from safety. The club appointed Graham Westley as manager in January 2003. Westley guided the club to 12th place, winning eight out of 12 league games. During the 2004–05 season, Stevenage qualified for the play-offs after finishing fifth under Westley's management. The team lost 1–0 to Carlisle United at the Britannia Stadium in the play-off final. The following year, the team finished sixth, outside the play-off places, and Westley's contract was not renewed, ending his three-and-a-half-year spell as manager. The club appointed Mark Stimson as their new manager and the team finished in eighth position in Stimson's first season. That season, the club reached the FA Trophy final again, overturning a 2–0 deficit to defeat Kidderminster Harriers 3–2 in front of a record FA Trophy crowd of 53,262. The victory meant that Stevenage became the first team to win a competitive final at the new Wembley Stadium.

Stevenage players celebrating winning the FA Trophy at Wembley Stadium in May 2009

After the FA Trophy success in 2007, and while retaining the majority of the first-team squad, Stevenage started the 2007–08 season by setting a new club record with the defence keeping eight consecutive clean sheets. Stimson was offered a new contract by Stevenage in October 2007, but resigned the following day to join Football League club Gillingham. In November 2007, he was replaced by Peter Taylor. After failing to reach the play-offs, Taylor resigned at the end of the season, and was replaced by former manager Graham Westley. On Westley's return, Stevenage started the season slowly before going on a 27-game unbeaten run from December to March, culminating in qualification for the play-offs, where they lost 4–3 on aggregate in the semi-finals to Cambridge United. During the same season, Stevenage enjoyed success in cup competitions; winning the Herts Senior Cup for the first time, beating Cheshunt 2–1 in the final, and the FA Trophy, where they defeated York City 2–0 in the final.

The following season, Westley retained the core of the squad and Stevenage were positioned in first place by New Year's Day. The team won eight consecutive games through February and March 2010, and Stevenage were promoted to the Football League for the first time in the club's history with two games to spare. Promotion was secured following a 2–0 victory away to Kidderminster Harriers, as Stevenage finished the season 11 points clear at the top of the table. The club reached the final of the 2010 FA Trophy, losing 2–1 after extra-time to Barrow. Shortly after the conclusion of the season, chairman Phil Wallace stated that the club would be changing its name to Stevenage Football Club, dropping the word 'Borough' from its title as of June 2010.

=== Football League (2010–present) ===
Stevenage's first Football League fixture was played against Macclesfield Town in August 2010, ending in a 2–2 draw at Broadhall Way. Following four defeats in six matches across December 2010 and January 2011, the club was positioned in 18th, four points above the relegation zone. During a congested period throughout February and March 2011, Stevenage won nine games out of 11 games, propelling the club up the league table and into the play-off positions. Stevenage subsequently reached the League Two play-offs, finishing sixth. They faced Torquay United in the 2011 Football League Two play-off final on 28 May 2011 at Old Trafford. Stevenage won the match 1–0, thereby securing promotion to League One for the first time in the club's history, and achieving back-to-back promotions. During the same season, Stevenage matched their previous best performance in the FA Cup, reaching the fourth round of the competition before losing 2–1 to Reading. In the previous round, Stevenage were drawn against Premier League club Newcastle United, whom they had previously met in the 1997–98 season, losing over two contentious games. Stevenage subsequently defeated Newcastle 3–1 at Broadhall Way, marking the first time the club had ever beaten top-flight opposition.

In their first season in the third tier of English football, Stevenage were positioned in the League One play-off places following a 14-match unbeaten run that lasted for three months. In January 2012, Westley opted to depart Stevenage to take up the vacant managerial position at Preston North End. Former Colorado Rapids manager Gary Smith was appointed as Westley's replacement. A run of four wins in their last five games meant that Stevenage finished in sixth, thus securing the final play-off position, where they lost 1–0 on aggregate to Sheffield United in the semi-final. Stevenage also reached the fifth round of the FA Cup for the first time in their history during the season, losing 3–1 to Premier League club Tottenham Hotspur in a replay at White Hart Lane, following a 0–0 draw at Broadhall Way.

The majority of the squad that had helped the club achieve back-to-back promotions into League One departed at the end of the season. New management under Smith, alongside a change in transfer policy, resulted in a complete squad overhaul. Stevenage were positioned within the top six places midway through the 2012–13 season, but a run of 14 losses from 18 matches from December 2012 meant the club were closer to the relegation places three months later. Smith was subsequently sacked in March 2013 and replaced by Westley, returning for his third spell at the club. The team finished in 18th place that season. A further squad overhaul took place ahead of the 2013–14 season and Stevenage were ultimately relegated back to League Two after finishing in last place in the League One standings that season. The team reached the play-off semi-finals in their first season back in League Two, losing to Southend United.

The club chose not to offer Westley a new contract and replaced him with Teddy Sheringham in May 2015, taking on his first managerial role. Sheringham was sacked in February 2016 with the club positioned in 19th place. First-team coach Darren Sarll took caretaker charge for the remainder of the season and was subsequently appointed on a permanent basis after helping the club avoid relegation. During Sarll's first full season in charge, the club finished three points from the play-off positions. With Stevenage in 16th place during the 2017–18 season, Sarll was sacked in March 2018; Wallace stating the club "had not seen the progress expected" since making a number of signings during the January transfer window. Former player and first-team coach, Dino Maamria, replaced Sarll as manager. During the 2018–19 season, Maamria's first full season in charge, the club finished 10th, one point from the play-off places. In May 2019, Wallace announced a 12% public equity offering, through sports investment platform Tifosy, aiming to raise funds to invest in player wages and increase the transfer budget. The offer closed on 31 July 2019, at which time the club stated that shares worth a total of £300,000 had been purchased.

The club began the 2019–20 season without a win in the opening month, and manager Maamria was subsequently sacked in September 2019. First-team coach Mark Sampson took caretaker charge, but with the club in 23rd place after several months under his management, Graham Westley returned for a fourth spell in December 2019. Two months later, Westley resigned, and was replaced by Alex Revell, who had previously assumed the role of player-coach at the club. The club was in last place of League Two when the season was suspended due to the COVID-19 pandemic in March 2020. EFL clubs formally agreed to end the season during an EFL meeting on 9 June 2020, although "ongoing disciplinary matters" involving 23rd-placed Macclesfield Town, who had failed to pay their players on six occasions during the season, meant that Stevenage might be reprieved. Stevenage were initially relegated from League Two after an independent disciplinary panel opted to deduct Macclesfield two points on 19 June, with a further four suspended. This was the maximum penalty that could be applied without enforcing relegation, and the panel identified this as a key factor in its decision. The EFL successfully appealed the panel's ruling, winning on 11 August; the four previously suspended points were applied to the 2019–20 season, meaning Stevenage finished 23rd and therefore remained in League Two .

Under Revell's management, the club finished the 2020–21 season in 14th position in League Two. After three victories in the first 16 matches of the 2021–22 season, Revell departed as first-team manager and was replaced by Paul Tisdale in November 2021. Tisdale left the club in March 2022, having won three of his 21 matches as manager. With the club placed 22nd in League Two after a nine-match winless run, three points clear of relegation, Steve Evans was appointed as manager. The team won four of their final nine matches, avoiding relegation and finishing in 21st position. During the 2022–23 season, under Evans' management, Stevenage earned promotion to League One after finishing second in League Two. That season, the club also defeated Premier League club Aston Villa 2–1 at Villa Park in the FA Cup third round, scoring two goals in the final minutes after trailing for most of the match. Evans departed for Rotherham United towards the end of the 2023–24 season and was succeeded by returning manager Alex Revell. Under Revell, the club recorded its joint-highest Football League finish by placing sixth in League One in the 2025–26 season, before losing to Stockport County in the play-off semi-finals.

== Club identity ==
=== Crest ===
The club has had five crests since its formation in 1976. The first club crest was designed in 1980 by Paul Dixon, coinciding with Stevenage attaining senior status. The club adopted the town's civic emblem as the basis of the crest. When the club were promoted to the Conference National in 1994, the crest was changed to the Stevenage Borough Council 'tick' in recognition of the help the club had received from the council during their progression through the football pyramid. In 1996, shortly after former chairman Victor Green assumed control of the club, a new crest was introduced, modelled on the town's coat of arms. This design incorporated the club's colours of red and white, as well as a hart, which appears on both the Stevenage and Hertfordshire coat of arms. This crest was slightly modified in 2010 to remove the word 'Borough', aligning with the club's name change prior to its entry into the Football League. Ahead of the 2011–12 season, the crest was enclosed within a shield, though this change was reversed two years later. A new crest was unveiled in June 2019, featuring the hart more prominently, being "brought to the forefront of the new design". The club stated that the preceding crest "presented modern-day challenges due to its complex and detailed design"; the new circular design was intended to establish a clearer visual identity across both commercial and social platforms.

=== Colours ===
The club has consistently played in red and white colours. Prior to taking on senior status, the team wore red and white striped shirts. This changed between 1980 and 1988, during which period the club adopted plain red shirts paired with white shorts, although an all-red strip was worn during the 1982–83 season. The club reverted to a striped design from 1988, and the strip configuration has varied considerably over the years. To mark the club's 40th anniversary during the 2016–17 season, supporters were consulted about their preferred historical kit. The outcome was a re-creation of the diagonal-striped design worn between 1996 and 1998.

A table of kit suppliers and shirt sponsors appear below:

Kit suppliers
Dates	Supplier
1980–1981	Le Coq Sportif
1982–1983	Admiral
1983–1985	Litesome
1985–1986	Hobott
1985–1986	Admiral
1994–2004	Vandanel
2004–2008	Erreà
2008–2011	Vandanel
2011–2013	Puma
2013–2015	Fila
2015–2017	Carbrini
2017–2026	Macron
2026–	Puma

Shirt sponsors
Dates	Sponsor
1985–1986	Abbey Life
1991–1993	Kings Park
1993–1996	Propak
1996–2004	Sunbank
2004–2006	AVC Broadband
2006–2008	CPM Omega
2008–2010	Megaman
2010–2011	LCN
2011–2012	ServerChoice
2012–2017	STS Tyre Pros
2017–2019	Astute Electronics
2019–2021	Burger King
2021–2023	Amazon Prime Gaming
2023–2024	Grilla
2024–	Xsolla

== Stadium ==
=== Broadhall Way ===
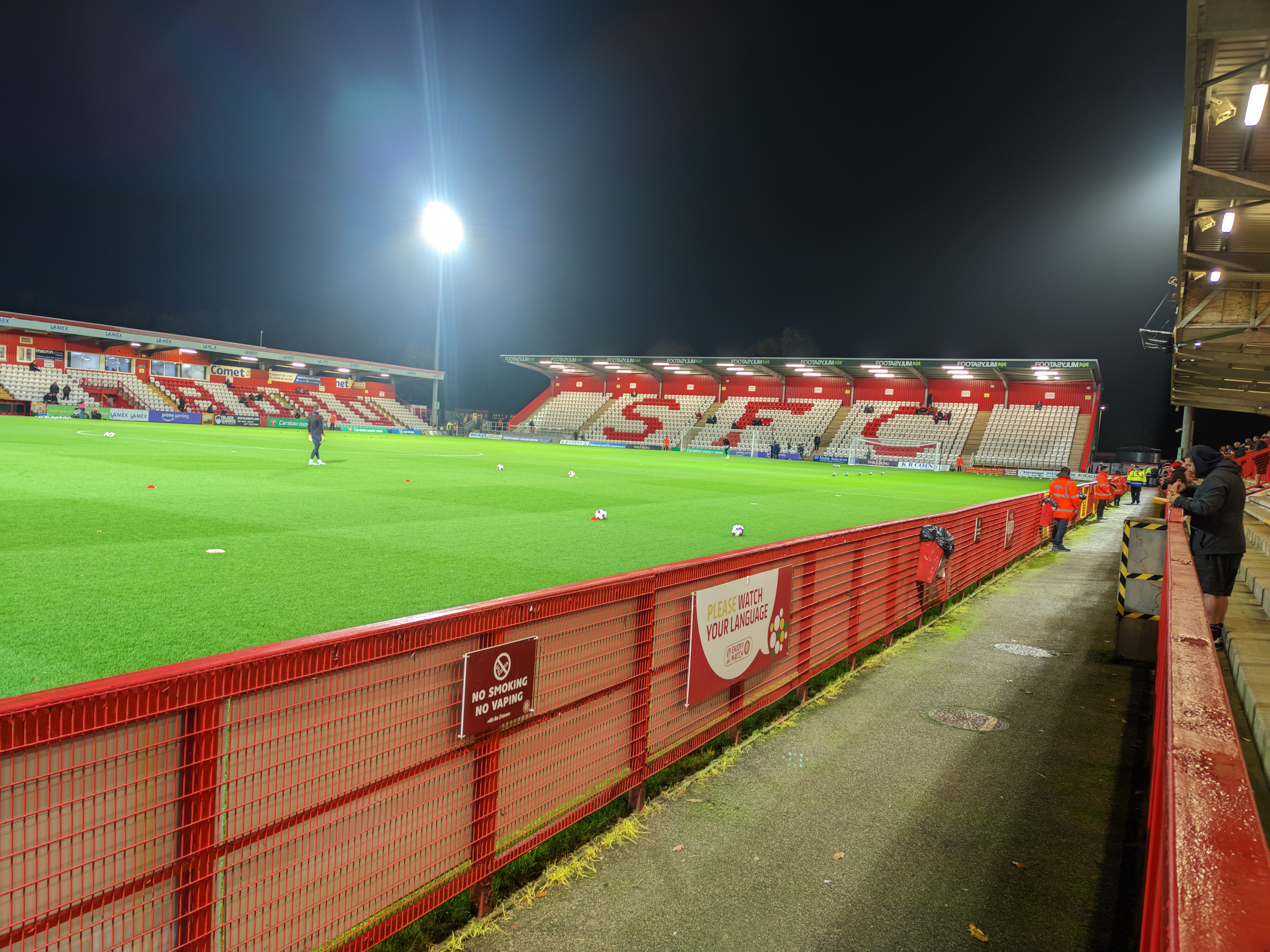
View of the North Stand from the East Terrace at Broadhall Way

The club plays its home matches at Broadhall Way, a ground that previously served as the home of both Stevenage Town and Stevenage Athletic. Following the bankruptcy of Stevenage Athletic, the stadium remained unused for three years. The newly formed Stevenage Borough moved into Broadhall Way in 1980, after the local council had re-purchased the stadium. The club finished the 1995–96 season as champions of the Football Conference, but was denied promotion to the Football League due to insufficient ground capacity and facilities. During the early 2000s, the stadium underwent upgrades, including the construction of a new £600,000 stand featuring an executive suite beneath it. As a result of the club's promotion as league champions during the club's 2009–10 season, Broadhall Way hosted League football for the first time during the 2010–11 season.

View of the East Terrace

The ground's pitch is bordered by four stands: the East Terrace, the North Stand, the West Stand, and the South Stand. The West Stand is an all-seated, covered structure that extends along the full length of the pitch, although it features open corners on either side. It has a capacity of 1,800 spectators. At the rear of the stand are several glass-fronted areas housing various club offices and executive boxes. The club shop is located adjacent to the West Stand, opposite the club's official car park. Directly opposite the West Stand is the East Terrace, a covered standing area designated for approximately 2,700 home supporters. The terrace features a gable with a clock mounted on its roof above the halfway line, and also houses a television gantry on its roof.

The former North Terrace, located behind the goal at the north end of the ground, comprised just seven steps and had a total capacity of approximately 700 spectators. Three-quarters of the terrace was covered, while the remaining quarter was uncovered. The area also provided facilities for disabled supporters. The North Terrace was demolished in January 2018 to make way for a new, modern stand. The development followed years of planning difficulties; as early as January 2013, the club had announced intentions to replace the terrace with a £1.2 million, 1,700-seat stand. However, these plans failed to materialise due to “numerous obstacles put in the way”. In July 2017, the club launched a mini-bond investment scheme, facilitated through the sports investment platform Tifosy, seeking to raise the remaining £500,000 required to complete construction. The target was reached within five weeks, following contributions from over 200 supporters. The new North Stand, a 1,428-seat, all-seater structure, was officially opened in December 2019.

Situated opposite the North Stand is the South Stand, a single-tiered, all-seated, covered stand. Constructed in 2001 at a cost of £600,000, the South Stand is designated for away supporters and has a capacity of 1,390 spectators. An electronic scoreboard, also installed in 2001, is positioned centrally on the roof, making it visible to home fans. This scoreboard was subsequently replaced in October 2011. Located behind the stand is the supporters' club building. A new set of floodlights was installed prior to the club's 2007–08 season.

In January 2009, the club signed a seven-figure sponsorship agreement with the Lamex Food Group, leading to the renaming of Broadhall Way to The Lamex Stadium. The naming rights agreement with Lamex Food Group expired in October 2025 following the retirement of club chairman Phil Wallace from the company, after which the ground was officially known as the Stevenage F.C. Stadium. In August 2026, the club signed a 10-year naming rights agreement with SPORTA, under which the stadium was renamed SPORTA Arena.

=== Training facilities ===
The club opened a £5 million training facility at nearby Shephalbury Park in the autumn of 2002. In June 2011, the club announced the acquisition of a 42-acre former sports ground in Bragbury End, with the intention of developing the site into a new, purpose-built training complex. Construction commenced in the summer of 2011, and club staff began using the complex towards the latter stages of the 2012–13 season.

== Records and statistics ==
Stevenage's highest Football League finish is sixth place in League One, achieved in both the 2011–12 and 2025–26 seasons. The club's best run in the FA Cup came in 2011–12, when they reached the fifth round. Stevenage's largest league victory was an 11–1 win over British Timken Athletic in the United Counties League in December 1980, while their heaviest defeat was an 8–0 loss to Charlton Athletic in an EFL Trophy match in October 2018.

The record for the most appearances for the club is held by Ronnie Henry, who made 502 appearances in all competitions across two spells with Stevenage. Martin Gittings is the club's all-time leading goalscorer, having scored 216 goals in all competitions. He remains the only player to have scored more than 100 goals for the club.

== Players ==
As of 15 September 2026

=== Current squad ===
Note: Flags indicate national team as defined under FIFA eligibility rules; some limited exceptions apply. Players may hold more than one non-FIFA nationality.

No.	Pos.	Nation	Player
1	GK	ENG	Tommy Setford (on loan from Arsenal)
2	DF	ANT	Luther James-Wildin
4	MF	ENG	Jordan Houghton
5	DF	ENG	Carl Piergianni (captain)
6	DF	ENG	Lewis Freestone
7	MF	WAL	Terry Taylor
8	MF	TTO	Dan Phillips
9	FW	NIR	Josh Magennis
10	MF	ENG	Dan Kemp
11	MF	ENG	Jordan Roberts
12	GK	WAL	Daniel Barden
14	DF	ENG	Saxon Earley
15	DF	GUY	Terence Vancooten
16	DF	ENG	Kaelan Casey (on loan from West Ham United)

No.	Pos.	Nation	Player
17	DF	ENG	Jasper Pattenden
18	FW	ENG	Olly Sanderson
19	FW	TUR	Tuğra Turhan (on loan from İstanbul Başakşehir)
20	FW	WAL	Chem Campbell
23	MF	WAL	Louis Thompson
24	MF	ENG	Matt Smith
25	FW	POR	Wanya Marçal
27	FW	ENG	Ben Broggio (on loan from Aston Villa)
28	FW	SCO	Michael Mellon
36	GK	ENG	Max Woodford
38	FW	ENG	Samuel Ayolie
39	DF	ENG	Alfie Thornett
43	MF	ENG	Charlie Brown
44	FW	SCO	Phoenix Patterson

=== Out on loan ===
Note: Flags indicate national team as defined under FIFA eligibility rules; some limited exceptions apply. Players may hold more than one non-FIFA nationality.

No.	Pos.	Nation	Player
3	DF	ENG	Dan Butler (at Swindon Town until 30 June 2027)
22	DF	ENG	Jack Taylor (at Exeter City until 30 June 2027)
24	FW	ENG	Jovan Malcolm (at York City until January 2027)
26	MF	ENG	Joe Knight (at Sutton United until December 2026)

=== Player of the Year ===
As voted for by Supporters Association members and season ticket holders at the club.

- 1993 (England) Martin Gittings
- 1994 (England) Stuart Beevor
- 1995 (England) Mark Smith
- 1996 (Jamaica) Barry Hayles
- 1997 (England) Paul Barrowcliff
- 1998 (England) Lee Harvey
- 1999 (England) Robin Trott
- 2000 (England) Chris Taylor
- 2001 (England) Mark Smith
- 2002 (England) Jason Goodliffe
- 2003 (England) Jason Goodliffe
- 2004 (France) Lionel Pérez
- 2005 (England) Dannie Bulman
- 2006 (Northern Ireland) Alan Julian
- 2007 (England) Ronnie Henry
- 2008 (Wales) Steve Morison
- 2009 (England) Mark Roberts
- 2010 (England) Scott Laird
- 2011 (England) Jon Ashton
- 2012 (England) Mark Roberts
- 2013 (England) James Dunne
- 2014 (England) Luke Freeman
- 2015 (England) Dean Wells
- 2016 (England) Michael Tonge
- 2017 (England) Matt Godden
- 2018 (England) Danny Newton
- 2019 (Scotland) Scott Cuthbert
- 2021 (England) Elliott List
- 2022 (England) Luke Norris
- 2023 (England) Carl Piergianni
- 2024 (England) Carl Piergianni
- 2025 (England) Dan Kemp
- 2026 (England) Filip Marschall

== Management ==
=== Club officials ===
Directors

- Chairman: Phil Wallace
- Directors: Stuart Dinsey, Marcus Taverner, Kylie Wallace, Marc Wallace

Management

- Manager: Alex Revell
- First-team coach: Scott Cuthbert
- Goalkeeping coach: Marlon Beresford
- Head of sports science: Brandon Bevans
- First-team analyst: Cavill Costi, Jake Moss
- First-team physio: Matt Rogers
- Kit manager: Keith Bell

=== Managerial history ===
Competitive games only. Statistics are correct as of match played 10 October 2026

Name	Nationality	From	To	Matches	Won	Drawn	Lost	Win %	Notes
Derek Montgomery	England	1979	June 1983	149	67	31	50	45%	
Frank Cornwell	England	July 1983	September 1987	277	130	51	96	46.9%	
John Bailey	England	September 1987	May 1988	39	11	8	20	28.2%	
Brian Williams	England	July 1988	May 1990	118	61	32	25	51.7%	
Paul Fairclough	England	June 1990	17 December 1998	509	288	90	131	56.6%	
Richard Hill	England	21 December 1998	16 April 2000	58	23	16	19	39.7%	
Steve Wignall	England	18 April 2000	28 May 2000	8	3	3	2	37.5%	
Paul Fairclough	England	31 May 2000	26 February 2002	85	31	29	25	36.5%	
Wayne Turner	England	27 February 2002	27 December 2002	45	15	7	23	33.3%	
Graham Westley	England	29 January 2003	30 June 2006	166	77	35	54	46.4%	
Mark Stimson	England	1 July 2006	17 October 2007	72	38	13	21	52.8%	
Peter Taylor	England	1 November 2007	28 April 2008	32	14	4	14	43.8%	
Graham Westley	England	2 May 2008	12 January 2012	201	109	49	43	54.2%	
Gary Smith	England	25 January 2012	20 March 2013	67	22	19	26	32.8%	
Graham Westley	England	30 March 2013	31 May 2015	112	38	25	49	33.9%	
Teddy Sheringham	England	1 June 2015	1 February 2016	33	7	10	16	21.2%	
Darren Sarll	England	1 February 2016	18 March 2018	114	41	26	47	36%	
Dino Maamria	Tunisia	20 March 2018	9 September 2019	69	24	15	30	34.8%	
Graham Westley	England	23 December 2019	16 February 2020	15	2	3	10	13.3%	
Alex Revell	England	16 February 2020	15 November 2021	77	20	30	27	26%	
Paul Tisdale	England	29 November 2021	16 March 2022	21	3	8	10	14.3%	
Steve Evans	Scotland	16 March 2022	17 April 2024	120	57	33	30	47.5%	
Alex Revell	England	17 April 2024	Present	123	49	30	44	39.8%	

== Honours ==
League

- League Two (level 4)
  - Runners-up: 2022–23
  - Play-off winners: 2011
- Conference National (level 5)
  - Champions: 1995–96, 2009–10
- Isthmian League
  - Premier Division champions: 1993–94
  - Division One champions: 1991–92
  - Division Two North champions: 1985–86, 1990–91
- United Counties League
  - Division One champions: 1980–81

Cup

- FA Trophy
  - Winners: 2006–07, 2008–09
  - Runners-up: 2001–02, 2009–10
- United Counties League, League Cup
  - Winners: 1980–81
- Herts Senior Cup
  - Winners: 2008–09
