= Knayton with Brawith =

Civil parish in North Yorkshire, England

Coordinates: 54.285650°N 1.337200°W

- Location within North Yorkshire
- Population: 318 (2011 census)
- OS grid reference: SE432879
- Civil parish: Knayton with Brawith
- Unitary authority: North Yorkshire
- Ceremonial county: North Yorkshire
- Region: Yorkshire and the Humber
- Country: England
- Sovereign state: United Kingdom
- Post town: THIRSK
- Postcode district: YO7
- Police: North Yorkshire
- Fire: North Yorkshire
- Ambulance: Yorkshire

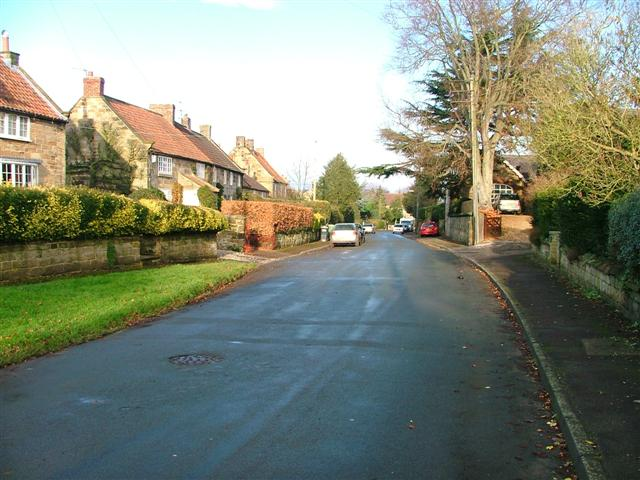
Knayton

Knayton with Brawith is a civil parish in the county of North Yorkshire, England. The parish includes the village of Knayton and the hamlet of Brawith. Knayton with Brawith can be accessed from the A19. Within the village of Knayton, there are no shops. It is 4 miles north of Thirsk and Brawith Hall is approximately a mile away from Knayton. The local primary school is Knayton Church of England Primary school, which provides education for 148 children between the ages of 4 and 11 years old. The village has a village hall that is situated on the green. The hall sits 100 people and has kitchen and accessibility facilities.

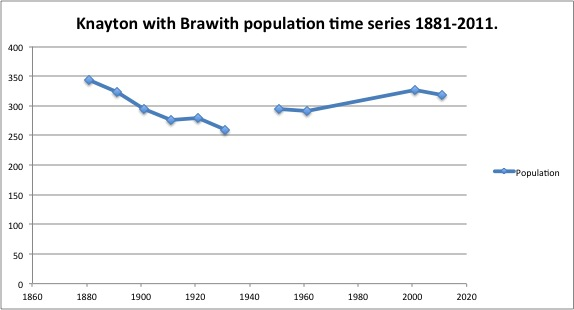
Total Population of Knayton with Brawith Civil Parish, as reported by the Census of Population from 1881 to 2011.

In the 1870s John Marius Wilson, described Knayton with Brawith as:

"A township and a sub-district, in Thirsk district, N. R. Yorkshire. The township lies 4 miles NNE of Thirsk"

From 1974 to 2023 it was part of the Hambleton District, it is now administered by the unitary North Yorkshire Council.

== Demographics ==
With a population of 318 and 148 households, Knayton with Brawith is a moderately sized civil parish. The average age of the population is 48.4, coupled with the largest age group being 45-59, proves that the population is of working age. The second largest age group is 65 to 74, therefore newly retired and portrays the ageing population of the country. The lowest age group is 18 to 19 showing that many young people move away so to access higher education or occupations. The population has fluctuated slightly, as seen by the population time series. However, the population has remained similar to the 1881 population of 344.

== Economy and industry ==
Back in 1801, there was a division of occupations, as people were employed in agriculture, trade, manufacturing and handicraft. In 1881 Knayton with Brawith's main occupation was agriculture, with 59 people working within the industry. Agriculture is still one of the largest industries, with 20 people still working in the industry in 2011. However, just as many people work in professional, scientific and technical activities. In the 2011 census data, it shows that there are 154 economically active inhabitants within Knayton with Brawith, with 26 inhabitants working part-time, 73 inhabitants working full-time, 52 inhabitants self-employed and 3 unemployed inhabitants.

== Housing ==
From 2011 there are 148 unshared households within Knayton with Brawith. With 95 of the households being detached and 33 of the households being semi detached. The average number of people within one household is 2.3 persons, with an average of 3.4 bedrooms per household. The average household price in Knayton with Brawith is £349 205, which is £192 048 more than the average household price for the region of Yorks and Humber.

== Listed buildings ==
There are a number of listed buildings in the area. Brawith Hall, is one of the main listed buildings as it makes up the Brawith part of the Knayton with Brawith civil parish. It is a Grade II listed building and was built in the 18th century with later alterations added to the building. Brawith Hall has descended from the Danby family of the first half of the 17th century. Part of Brawith Hall is Brawith Bridge (Grade II listed building, built 19th century), which was built so to divert the road away from Brawith Hall. Within the village there are 12 listed buildings. Turnpins Lodge, Hamwood Cottage, South End, Moor House, South Fields, Ramblers Cottage, Brewers Cottage and Pear Tree Cottage are all Grade II listed cottages, all built in the Mid late 18th century. There are then 4 other Grade II listed buildings within the village, all built around the 17th century.

== Sport and recreation ==
The Dog and Gun is the local public house in Knayton, that faces the village green. The Hillside Rural Activities Park, is situated in 28-acres, that is close to the A19. The Park was acquired through grants and legacies and includes an area owned by the Scouts, a cricket pitch, 3 tennis courts, 2 football pitches, outdoor gym and a children’s play area. The Park is open for public access and is home to the “Hillside Scouts, Knayton Football Club, AFC Hillside, Leake Cricket, Leake Tennis and Borrowby Show”. The Borrowby Show occurs on the last Wednesday of July and consists of a number of classes, exhibits, show jumping, trade stands, gymkhana, fancy dress parade and a dance held in the evening within a marquee.

== Transport ==
Except for school buses, there is no public transport.
