= Braythorn =

Village in North Yorkshire, England

Coordinates: 53.93682°N 1.62808°W

- Location within North Yorkshire
- OS grid reference: SE245490
- Unitary authority: North Yorkshire
- Ceremonial county: North Yorkshire
- Region: Yorkshire and the Humber
- Country: England
- Sovereign state: United Kingdom
- Post town: OTLEY
- Postcode district: LS21
- Police: North Yorkshire
- Fire: North Yorkshire
- Ambulance: Yorkshire

Braythorn is a hamlet in the civil parish of Stainburn, in North Yorkshire, England. Population statistics are accounted for in the 2011 census under Stainburn, and the hamlet is represented at Westminster as part of the Skipton and Ripon Constituency.

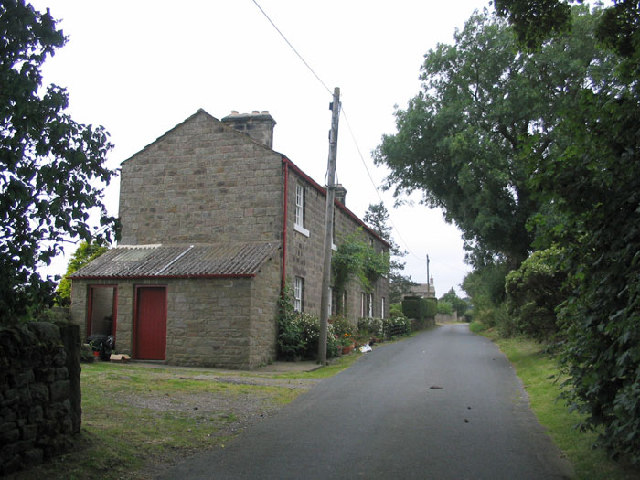
Looking north through Braythorn village
