= Brawith Hall =

Building in North Yorkshire, England

Coordinates: 54°16′47″N 1°22′16″W

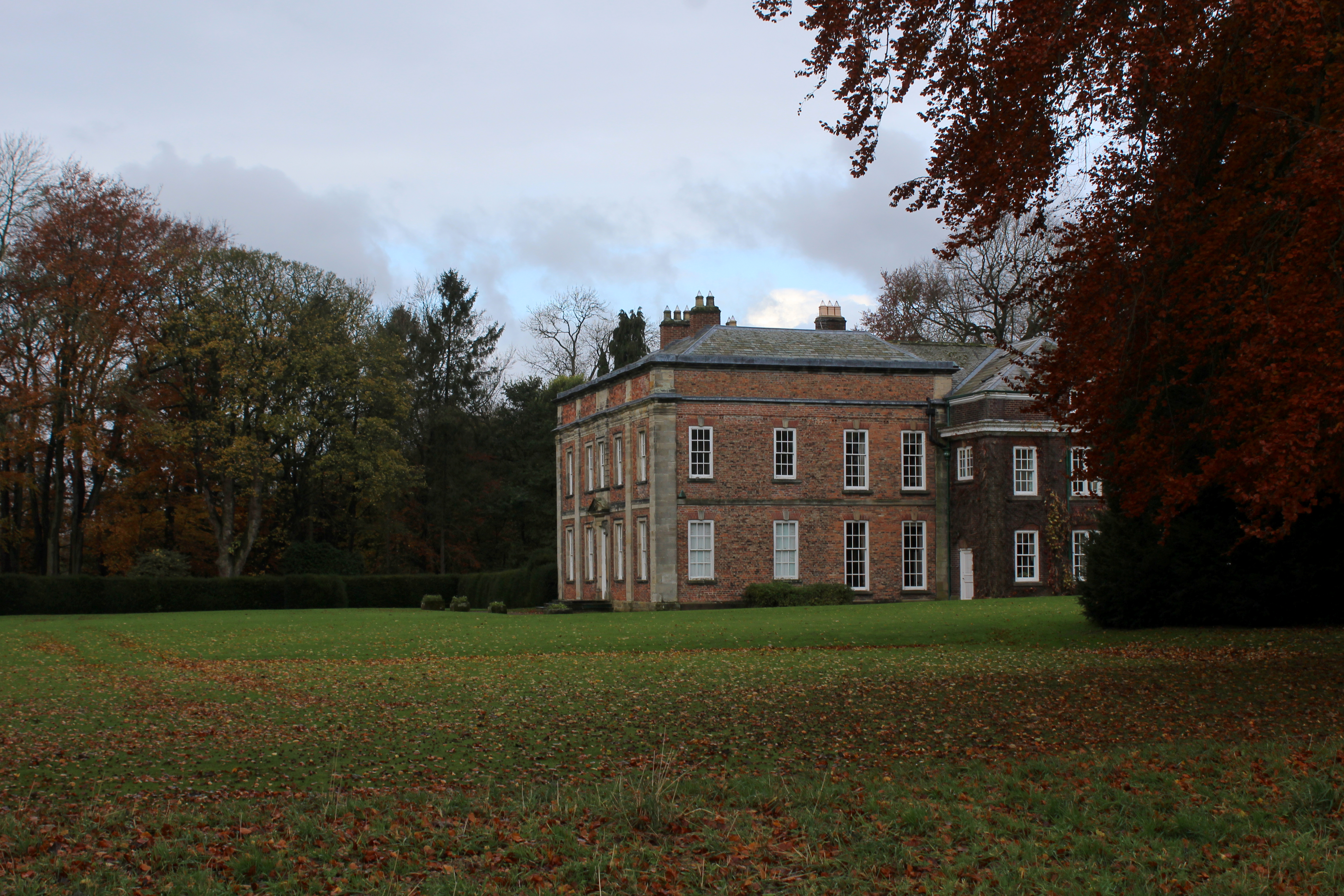
The building, in 2019

Brawith Hall is a historic building in Brawith, a hamlet in North Yorkshire, in England.

There was a Mediaeval manor house in Brawith. In the early 18th century, it was demolished and the current hall was built, facing south. In the late 19th century, a rear range was added. Part of the east front was rebuilt in the 20th century. The building was grade II* listed in 1952. The Victoria County History describes it as having a "fine park on the banks of the Cod Beck".

The house is built of red and pale brown brick, with sandstone dressings, a hipped Westmorland slate roof, two storeys and attics. The south front has five bays on a stone plinth, with giant pilasters and a parapet. It has a chamfered floor band, a moulded cornice with a pulvinated frieze over the ground floor, and a cornice under the parapet. Steps lead up to the central doorway that has an eared architrave, and a pediment containing a pulvinated frieze on consoles. The windows are sashes in architraves, with coved lintels and chamfered sills, the window above the doorway with a rusticated surround. The east and west fronts have four bays. Inside, there is a grand staircase hall, and two ground floor rooms with early-18th century decoration.

== See also ==
- Grade II* listed buildings in North Yorkshire (district)
- Listed buildings in Knayton with Brawith
