= Brazenhill =

Coordinates: 52.78°N 02.20°W

- Location within Staffordshire
- OS grid reference: SJ8621
- Shire county: Staffordshire
- Region: West Midlands
- Country: England
- Sovereign state: United Kingdom
- Post town: Stafford
- Postcode district: ST18
- Police: Staffordshire
- Fire: Staffordshire
- Ambulance: West Midlands

Brazenhill is a rural area immediately north of the village of Haughton in Staffordshire, England. It is effectively defined by Brazenhill Lane which is a rural road running out of Haughton, bearing northwest, connecting with Station Road. Domestic properties along the road are Brazenhill House, Brazenhill Lodge, Brazenhill Cottage and The Laburnums and there are two farms Brazenhill Farm and Mayo Farm (a livery stable).
