= Brand Green =

Village in Gloucestershire, England

Coordinates: 51.95°N 02.37°W

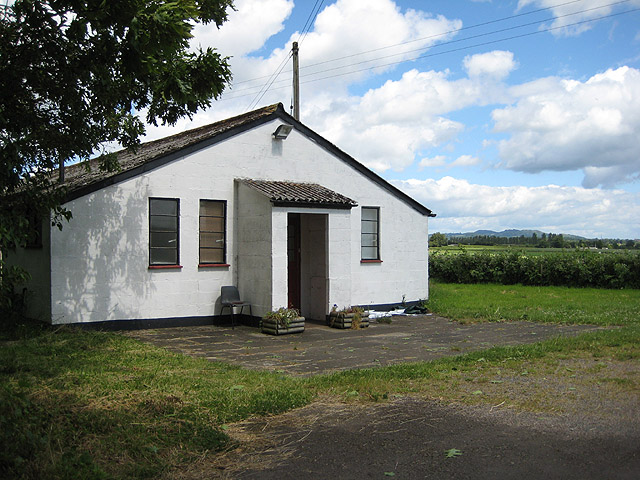
- Pauntley Memorial Hall at Brand Green

- Location within Gloucestershire
- OS grid reference: SO7428
- Shire county: Gloucestershire
- Region: South West
- Country: England
- Sovereign state: United Kingdom
- Police: Gloucestershire
- Fire: Gloucestershire
- Ambulance: South Western

Brand Green is a village in Gloucestershire, England.
