= Bran End =

Hamlet in Essex, England

Coordinates: 51.89°N 00.39°E

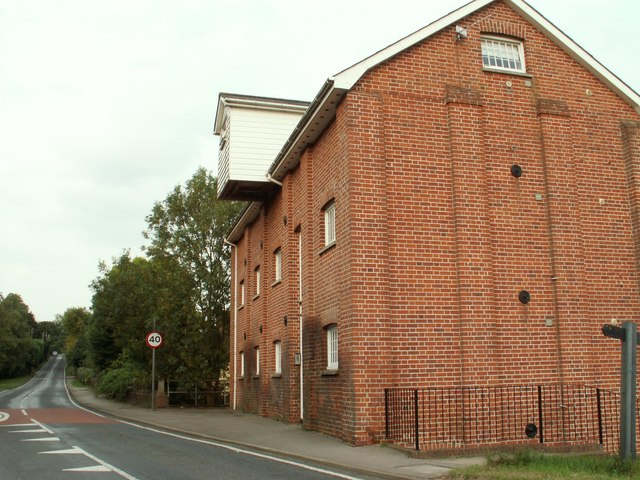
- The old Mill

- Location within Essex
- OS grid reference: TL6525
- Shire county: Essex
- Region: East
- Country: England
- Sovereign state: United Kingdom
- Police: Essex
- Fire: Essex
- Ambulance: East of England

Bran End is a hamlet in Stebbing Parish in Essex, England.

It is the site of the Bran End Mill House, a Grade II Listed Building.

The 1881 census shows that Marshall Cook of the Essex Constabulary resided in Bran End with his family.
