= Brawith =

Hamlet in North Yorkshire, England

Coordinates: 54°16′55″N 1°21′40″W

- Location within North Yorkshire
- OS grid reference: NZ505075
- Civil parish: Knayton with Brawith
- Unitary authority: North Yorkshire
- Ceremonial county: North Yorkshire
- Region: Yorkshire and the Humber
- Country: England
- Sovereign state: United Kingdom
- Post town: MIDDLESBROUGH
- Postcode district: TS9
- Police: North Yorkshire
- Fire: North Yorkshire
- Ambulance: Yorkshire

Brawith Hall driveway

Brawith is a hamlet in the county of North Yorkshire, England; it forms part of the civil parish of Knayton with Brawith.

From 1974 to 2023 it was part of the Hambleton District, it is now administered by the unitary North Yorkshire Council.

Brawith Hall lies in the hamlet, on the site of a mediaeval manor house.
