= Bransty =

Suburb of Whitehaven, Cumbria, England

Coordinates: 54.55°N 03.59°W

- Location in Copeland Borough Location within Cumbria
- Population: 5,069
- OS grid reference: NX9719
- Unitary authority: Cumberland
- Ceremonial county: Cumbria
- Region: North West
- Country: England
- Sovereign state: United Kingdom
- Police: Cumbria
- Fire: Cumbria
- Ambulance: North West

Bransty is a suburb of Whitehaven in Cumbria, England. It had a population of 5,069 at the 2021 Census. It is an average sized housing estate. The centre of it, The Green, is a meeting place for children to play football and games. It contains three forests, built around North Road and South View Road and Earls Road. Bransty School is on the top half of Bransty. It is a Primary school which contains roughly 200 pupils.

Bransty is located on the coast front of the town with fantastic views which overlook Whitehavens historic harbour, the Irish Sea and has great views of Scotland and the Isle of Man on clear days.

Bransty had a Royal British Legion club which in 2006 was the first in the UK to be revamped as a New British Legion Club.

Bransty New Legion, was situated at the top of Bransty Road, it had a members bar and was used for parties and local meetings, and had darts, dominoes and pool teams which have been successful in the past. The club used to hold bingo nights and did meals through the week and on Sundays. The club has unfortunately been shut down since 2013 and houses have been built in its place.

The club was the home for the local Football sides Bransty Rangers. The football pitch is behind the legion cutting down the field. There are seven fields next to the football pitch which are used for farming. The football pitch has currently been extended due to work on the cliffs Due to safety conditions of houses on the wagon road.

Bransty was also known for its bakery and post office which back in 2005 closed and was refurbished into houses.

As of 2008, Bransty Rangers Football Club plays in Division One of the Tesco Cumberland League. The club comprises many age groups from under 8's up to under 16's, also Girls teams. The open age team plays in the Tesco county league on Saturdays and plays in the Egremont league on Sundays.

Bransty used to have a small children's play park which was situated down from the football field, which had great views of the harbour and the sea. It was removed in 2017 due to safety concerns.
