= Braeface =

Coordinates: 55.998°N 03.949°W

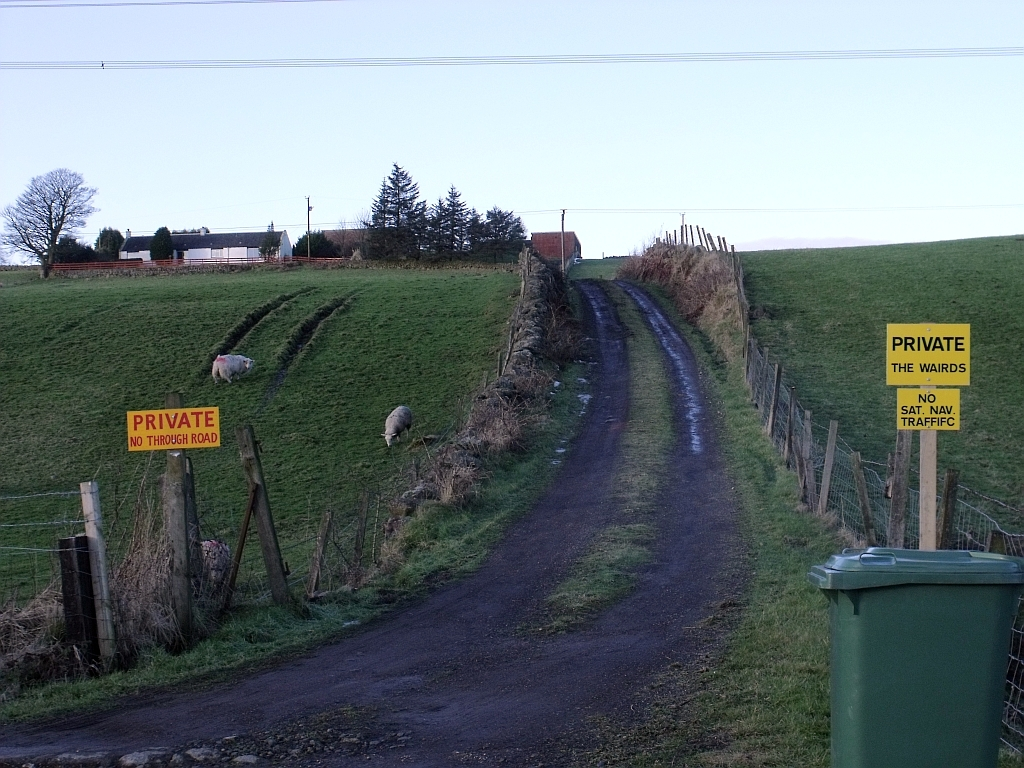
- The Wairds farm, Braeface

- Location within the Falkirk council area
- OS grid reference: NS784800
- Civil parish: Denny
- Council area: Falkirk
- Lieutenancy area: Stirling and Falkirk
- Country: Scotland
- Sovereign state: United Kingdom
- Post town: BONNYBRIDGE
- Postcode district: FK4
- Dialling code: 01324
- Police: Scotland
- Fire: Scottish
- Ambulance: Scottish
- UK Parliament: Falkirk
- Scottish Parliament: Falkirk West

Braeface is a village in Falkirk, Scotland.
