= Brassey Green =

Coordinates: 53.141°N 02.703°W

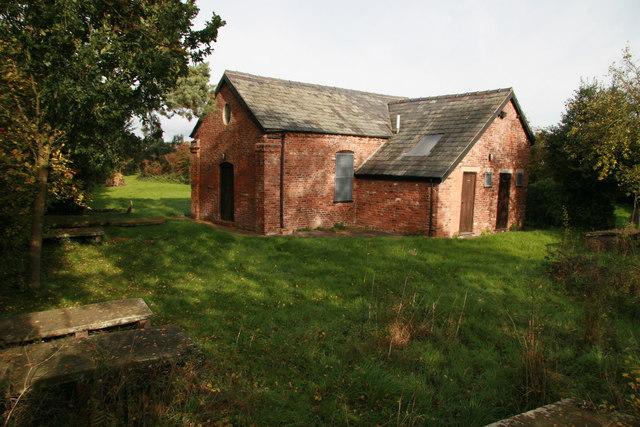
- Brassey Green Baptist Church

- Location within Cheshire
- Population: 21
- OS grid reference: SJ5260
- Civil parish: Tiverton and Tilstone Fearnall
- Unitary authority: Cheshire West and Chester
- Ceremonial county: Cheshire
- Region: North West
- Country: England
- Sovereign state: United Kingdom
- Post town: TARPORLEY
- Postcode district: CW6
- Dialling code: 01829
- Police: Cheshire
- Fire: Cheshire
- Ambulance: North West
- UK Parliament: Chester South and Eddisbury

Brassey Green is a small rural village near Tarporley, in Tiverton and Tilstone Fearnall civil parish, within the unitary authority of Cheshire West and Chester and the ceremonial county of Cheshire, England.

Brassey Green Hall is a two storeyed, 16th century farmhouse and a designated Grade II listed building. It is timber-framed with wattle and daub and rendered brick infill and a slate roof. The 18th century Brassey Green Baptist Chapel is also Grade II listed. Constructed with red brick and a Welsh slate roof, it was restored from 1983 after falling into disrepair. Although no longer a place of worship, it has since been used occasionally by youth groups.

== See also ==
- Listed buildings in Tiverton, Cheshire
