= Braehead, Banchory =

Proposed housing development in Aberdeenshire, Scotland

Coordinates: 57.045282°N 2.496024°W

Braehead, Banchory is a proposed major housing development to the south of Banchory, Aberdeenshire, Scotland. The site is home to Braehead farm, formerly part of the historic Banchory Lodge estate situated to the south of the River Dee, between the Falls of Feugh and Scolty Hill.

The farm has been owned by the former Chairman of Grampian Country Foods Alfred J Duncan CBE since 1990 and has been the centre of a number of development proposals submitted to Aberdeenshire Council since 2013, varying in size from between 230 and 700 homes.

== Braehead farm ==
Braehead farm is located to the south of Banchory, Aberdeenshire, in the rural community of Auchattie. The farm was part of the wider Banchory Lodge estate until 1950 when it was sold to Col. Reginald Pepys De Winton as part of the smaller Riverstone estate. Braehead farm itself was separated and sold to Permanent Homes in 1980. Between 1980 and 1990 the farm was owned by a succession of property developers including Select Builders and Leigh Estates until Mr Duncan purchased the farm in 1990. Farming was finally stopped in 1996 since which time many fields have remained empty, with others used for grazing horses and as parking for the annual Banchory Show.

== Planning history ==
Following the 2006 Planning Act and the introduction of the new Local Development Plan (LDP) system, in 2009 a proposal was submitted to Aberdeenshire Council for the inclusion of the Braehead site as part of the first Aberdeenshire LDP. This bid was rejected at the time with the Council noting "As regards Auchattie (Banchory south of the River Dee), this area constitutes a visual asset to Banchory as a whole, which has developed in a traditional low density semirural manner, which any redevelopment would destroy. In consequence of this none of the development bids for this area is preferred". Following the adoption of the first Aberdeenshire LDP (2012), Aberdeenshire Council once again began accepting bid sites in order to prepare the succeeding development plan (2016 LDP). In 2013, as part of this process, Sandlaw Farming submitted a bid for a 230 home development on part of the Braehead site. Again this bid was not accepted, the Council noted "this site along with those proposed around Auchattie nearby ‘would result in a major intrusion of development into the countryside south of the River Dee…the view from Scolty Hill…would be significantly affected by these developments. Major investment in roads and drainage infrastructure would be required to deliver these proposals. The deliverability of any development within the timescale of the proposed Plan is uncertain’". In response, the community submitted 244 objections to the Braehead farm bid that were discussed at a meeting of the local Marr Area Councillors on 3 June 2014.

In parallel to the Local Development Plan process, on 27 June 2014 Sandlaw Farming submitted a separate proposal for a 700 home multi-phase development on a larger site encompassing Braehead and adjoining westerly fields. The proposal was followed by two days of public meetings in Banchory on 22 and 23 August 2014.

Following the public meetings, on 28 January 2015 a formal application was submitted for a 400 home single phase development on the Braehead farm site. During the 6 week public consultation period a record 525 objections were submitted to Aberdeenshire Council. On 7 May 2015, at a meeting of the Marr Area Committee of local Councillors, officials from the Aberdeenshire Planning Department set out 7 'reasons for refusal' for the Braehead application. Local Councillors revised this to 10 reasons for refusal and passed this recommendation on to the full session of Aberdeenshire Council. This recommendation was unanimously passed at a meeting on 18 June where the 400 home application was rejected on 10 counts.

During this period, on 12 March 2015, Aberdeenshire Council also published the 2016 Proposed LDP. The Braehead bid site was not included as part of this publication with the Council noting "The importance to the community of the area to the south side of the River Dee ... must be recognised". Immediately following the unanimous rejection of planning permission by Aberdeenshire Council, Sandlaw Farming announced that they would be appealing the decision. This appeal was formally lodged on 17 September 2015 and withdrawn prior to determination on 1 December. During this period a revised planning application for 300 homes was being prepared simultaneously and was submitted on 1 December.

The revised application for 300 homes gathered another record number of objections, attracting 634 by the time the consultation period ended on 18 February 2016. The Marr Area Committee again voted unanimously to recommend 10 reasons for refusal when they met on 29 March 2016, a recommendation that was accepted by Aberdeenshire Council when they voted unanimously to reject planning permission on 28 April 2016. The rejected application was appealed on 28 July 2016 and the appeal thrown out by the Scottish Government on 9 November 2016.

=== Community objections ===
The development plan has generated multiple community objections since they were first submitted to the Council in 2013. The two most recent applications have received the highest number of objections on record by Aberdeenshire Council. The local community strongly values the landscape south of the River Dee, including Braehead farm and the neighbouring attractions, the falls of Feugh and Scolty Hill. The community have also expressed concerns about the impact of any development on the River Dee Special Area of Conservation in addition to local services and infrastructure. In addition the site is outside the 2012 Aberdeenshire LDP and has not been recommended for inclusion in the Proposed 2016 Aberdeenshire LDP, many in the local community believe this to be sufficient reason for the applications to be rejected. Further controversy surrounds Sandlaw Farming’s use of repeated planning applications and their employment of sitting government advisors as consultants.
