= Brandy Wharf =

Hamlet in Lincolnshire, England

Coordinates: 53.460332°N 0.473379°W

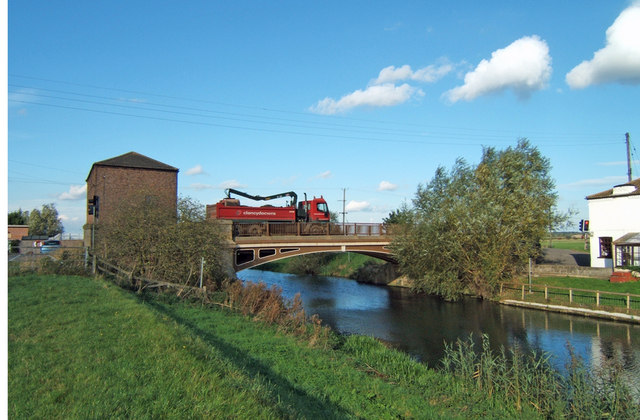
- Bridge at Brandy Wharf, built by John Rennie. The brick warehouse dates back to the 19th century

- Location within Lincolnshire
- OS grid reference: TF014970
  - London: 135 mi (217 km) S
- District: West Lindsey
- Shire county: Lincolnshire
- Region: East Midlands
- Country: England
- Sovereign state: United Kingdom
- Post town: Gainsborough
- Postcode district: DN21
- Police: Lincolnshire
- Fire: Lincolnshire
- Ambulance: East Midlands
- UK Parliament: Gainsborough

Brandy Wharf is a hamlet in the West Lindsey district of Lincolnshire, England, it is part of Waddingham parish . It is situated near and between Waddingham and South Kelsey, where the B1205 crosses the New River Ancholme.

The place name, Brandy Wharf, is modern and is first noticed on the Ordnance Survey map of 1824.

The bridge at Brandy Wharf was constructed in cast iron by engineer John Rennie in 1831. The ribs were cast by The Butterley Company.

Brandy Wharf contains a leisure park and formerly a cider centre which closed in 2014 and is now a Private Residence. The cider centre was originally a cottage and the earliest record is its purchase by Magdalene Porter, who bought it from a yeoman farmer named John Atkinson in 1728. It passed through the hands of William Smith, John Hill and Ann Chapman. Thomas Atkinson bought it in about 1801 and named it the Anchor Inn; it was in the family for 69 years. After improvements to the River Ancholme, trade increased as did the population.
