= Bradaford =

Village in Devon, England

Coordinates: 50.725°N 04.280°W

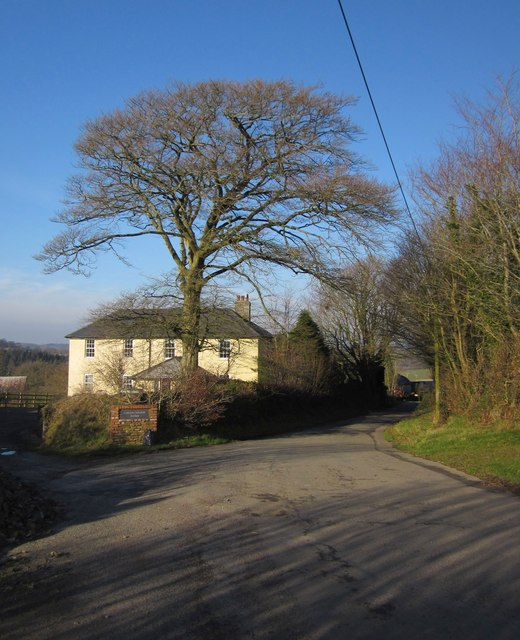
- Church View Farm

- Location within Devon
- OS grid reference: SX3994
- Civil parish: Virginstow
- District: Torridge
- Shire county: Devon
- Region: South West
- Country: England
- Sovereign state: United Kingdom
- Police: Devon and Cornwall
- Fire: Devon and Somerset
- Ambulance: South Western

Bradaford is a hamlet in the civil parish of Virginstow, in Torridge district, in the county of Devon, England. Bradaford was recorded in the Domesday Book as Bradeford.
