= Braehead (Fredericksburg, Virginia) =

Historic house in Virginia, United States

- U.S. National Register of Historic Places
- Virginia Landmarks Register
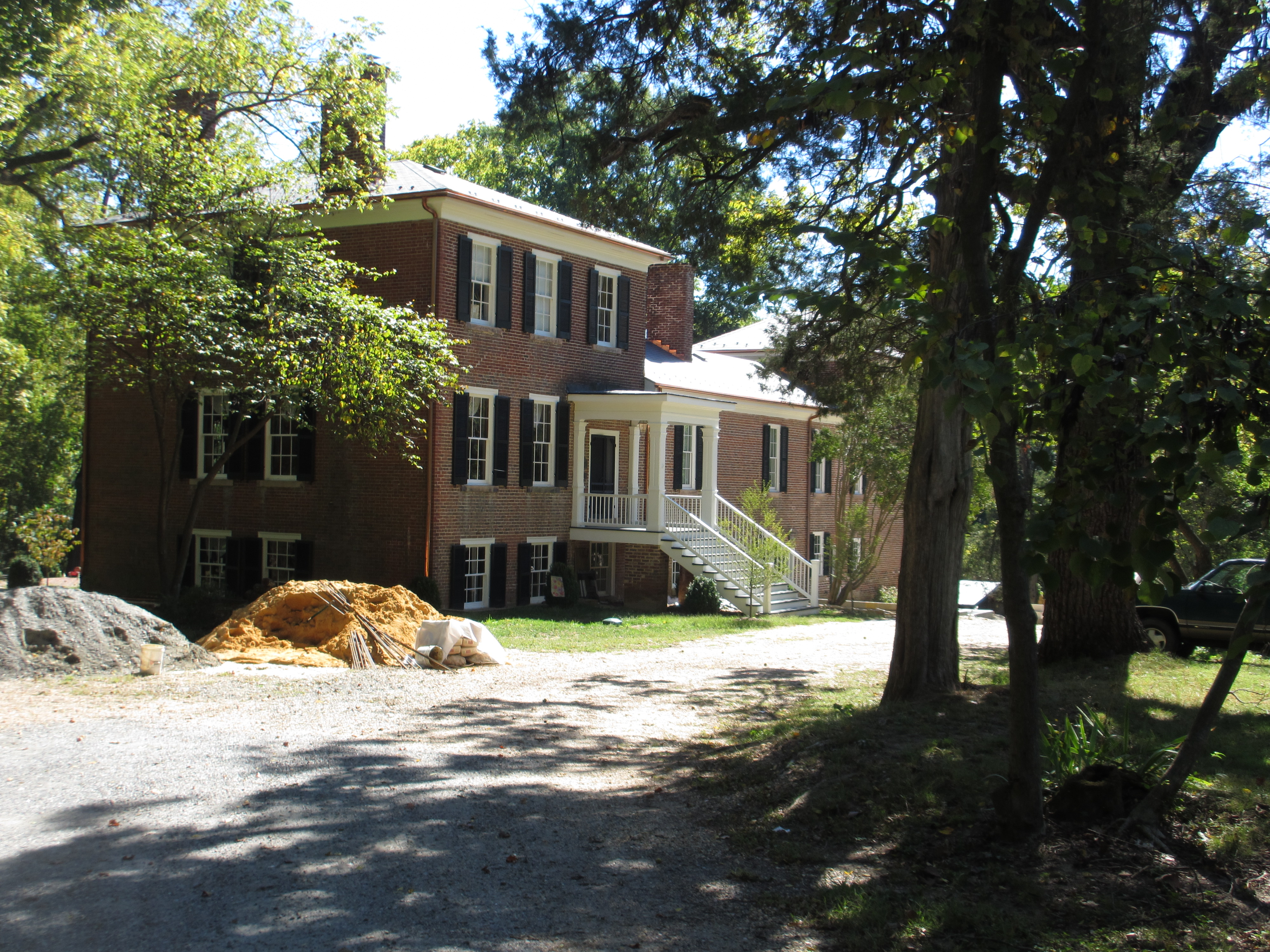

- Location within Northern Virginia Location within Virginia Location within the United States
- Location: 123 Lee Dr., Fredericksburg, Virginia
- Coordinates: 38°16′51″N 77°28′23″W
- Area: 18.9 acres (7.6 ha)
- Built: 1858
- Built by: George Mullen
- Architectural style: Greek Revival
- NRHP reference No.: 00000484
- VLR No.: 111-0306

Significant dates
- Added to NRHP: May 11, 2000
- Designated VLR: March 15, 2000

Braehead is a historic house located in Fredericksburg, Virginia. The 6,000-square-foot house was built in 1858-1859 by George Mullen for John Howison, who was born in Fredericksburg, Virginia, in 1809. John Howison's sister was the renowned Civil War diarist, Jane Briggs (née Howison) Beale.

John Howison's father, Samuel Howison, was born in Prince William, Virginia, in 1779. He and his wife, Helen Rose Moore, purchased the house at 1300 Charles Street, Fredericksburg, in 1828. Samuel Howison's father, Stephen Howison, was born in 1735/36 in St. Mary's, Maryland. Stephen Howison's father, John Howison, was born in Braehead, Scotland, in 1682.

In 1843, Howison married Anne Richards Lee, a distant cousin of Robert E. Lee through the Hancock Lees, also known as “the Ditchley Lees.” The house now known as "Braehead" was named in memory of the Lee home where she grew up. Originally known as "Greenview", it was a house and a farm. Before the first Battle of Fredericksburg, General Lee took breakfast at Greenview (Braehead), spending time with distant relations, although Anne Lee Howison had died earlier in the year.

John Howison's oldest sons both perished in the Civil War. After the war, John Howison could no longer afford to keep Greenview, including the farm and dairy, and sold it to his younger brother, Robert Reid Howison, a sometime lawyer and, later, a Presbyterian minister. Robert Reid Howison had written and published a major history of Virginia in 1846 and renamed the house "Braehead." It was a descendant of Robert Reid Howison who owned the house when it was sold in 2006.

The house was added to the National Register of Historic Places in May 2000. It is noted for its distinctive characteristics of design and construction and for its historical significance.

Braehead is a two-story brick building that is nine bays wide. The main part of the house is square with a two-story kitchen connected by a hyphen. The house has a double-pile (two rooms between the front and rear walls), sidepassage plan with hipped roofed entrance porticos on the east and west façades.

Also on the property are two sites contributing to its historical significance: the ruins of a worked stone icehouse and the chimney base of an antebellum house. The house is within the Fredericksburg and Spotsylvania National Military Park.

During the Battle of Fredericksburg, General Robert E. Lee's headquarters were located near the home. On the morning of December 13, 1862, Lee had breakfast at Braehead.
