= Brathens =

Village in Aberdeenshire, Scotland

Coordinates: 57.07°N 02.54°W

- Location within Aberdeenshire
- OS grid reference: NO6798
- Council area: Aberdeenshire
- Lieutenancy area: Kincardineshire
- Country: Scotland
- Sovereign state: United Kingdom
- Police: Scotland
- Fire: Scottish
- Ambulance: Scottish
- UK Parliament: West Aberdeenshire and Kincardine
- Scottish Parliament: Aberdeenshire West

Brathens is a village in Aberdeenshire, Scotland.

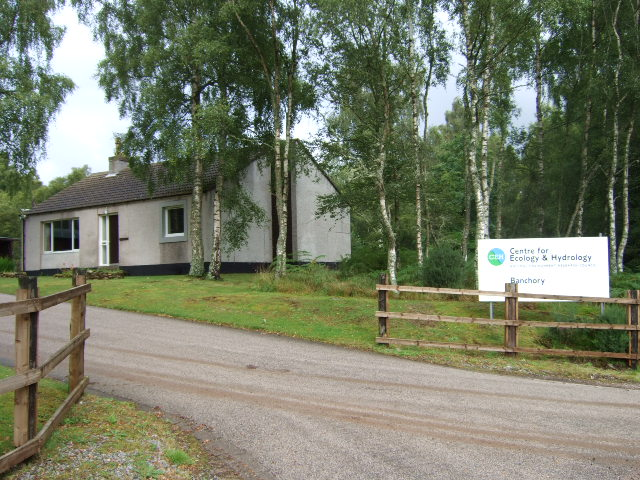
The entrance lodge of DEFRA's Centre for Ecology & Hydrology (CEH) at Brathens
