= Bracora =

Coordinates: 56.96°N 05.76°W

- Location within the Lochaber area
- OS grid reference: NM714929
- Council area: Highland
- Country: Scotland
- Sovereign state: United Kingdom
- Police: Scotland
- Fire: Scottish
- Ambulance: Scottish

Bracora or Bracara is a settlement in Lochaber in the Highlands of Scotland. It lies on the north shore of Loch Morar.
