= 1976–77 FA Vase =

Football Association Vase

Tournament details
- Country: England; Wales

Final positions
- Champions: Billericay Town
- Runners-up: Sheffield

The 1976–77 FA Vase was the third season of the FA Vase, an annual football competition for teams in the lower reaches of the English football league system.

Billericay Town won the competition for the second year running, beating Sheffield in the final.

== Semi-finals ==
Leg no	Home team (tier)	Score	Away team (tier)	Attendance
1st	Farnborough Town	2–0	Billericay Town	
2nd	Billericay Town	6–0	Farnborough Town	

Billericay Town won 6–2 on aggregate.

Leg no	Home team (tier)	Score	Away team (tier)	Attendance
1st	Sheffield	2–0	Barton Rovers	2,000
2nd	Barton Rovers	1–1	Sheffield	

Sheffield won 3–1 on aggregate.

== Final ==
30 April 1977

Billericay Town	1 – 1	Sheffield

Wembley Stadium, London

=== Replay ===
4 May 1977

Billericay Town	2 – 1	Sheffield

City Ground, Nottingham
