= Brae of Achnahaird =

Coordinates: 58.06487°N 5.37019°W

- Location within the Highland council area
- OS grid reference: NC012133
- Council area: Highland
- Country: Scotland
- Sovereign state: United Kingdom
- Postcode district: IV26 2
- Police: Scotland
- Fire: Scottish
- Ambulance: Scottish

Brae of Achnahaird (Achadh na h-Àirde) is a small settlement at the head of Achnahaird Bay in Achiltibuie, Ullapool in Ross-shire, Scottish Highlands and is in the Scottish council area of Highland. The headland of Rubha Coigeach lies approximately 4 miles to the north west.
