= Brain's Green =

Coordinates: 51.76°N 02.49°W

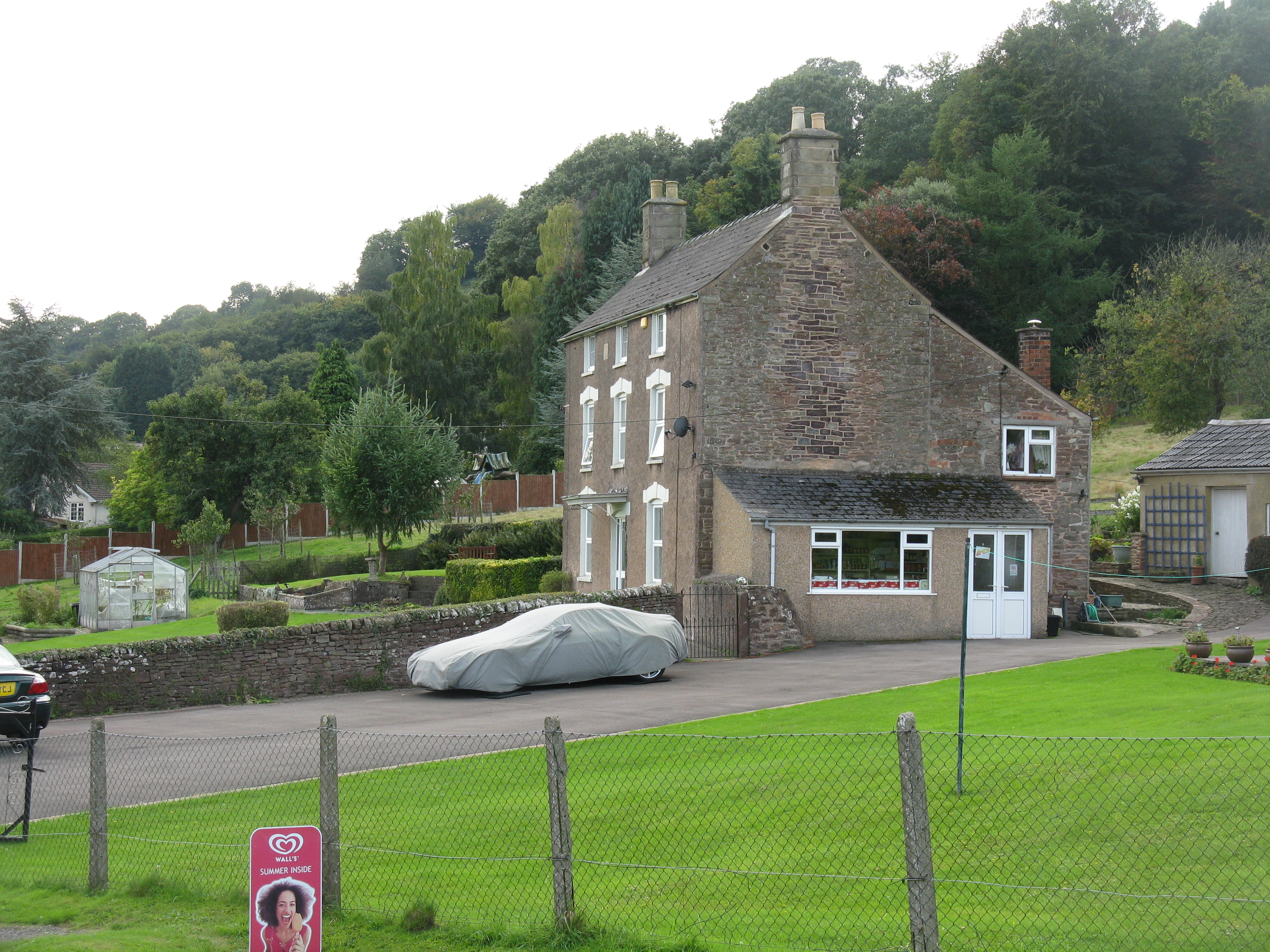
- Woodside House, Brains Green

- Location within Gloucestershire
- OS grid reference: SO6608
- Shire county: Gloucestershire
- Region: South West
- Country: England
- Sovereign state: United Kingdom
- Police: Gloucestershire
- Fire: Gloucestershire
- Ambulance: South Western

Brain's Green is a hamlet in Gloucestershire, England.
