= Brands Hill =

Coordinates: 51.48°N 00.54°W

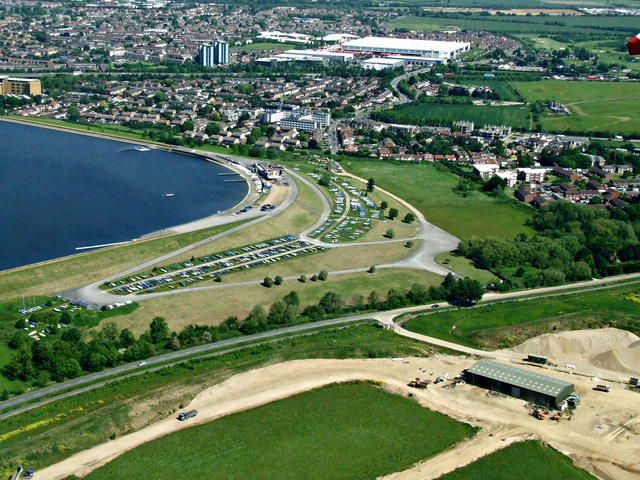
- Brands Hill from the air in 2014, with the Queen Mother Reservoir on the left.

- Location within Berkshire
- OS grid reference: TQ0177
- Civil parish: Colnbrook with Poyle
- Unitary authority: Slough
- Ceremonial county: Berkshire
- Region: South East
- Country: England
- Sovereign state: United Kingdom
- Post town: SLOUGH
- Postcode district: SL3
- Dialling code: 01753
- Police: Thames Valley
- Fire: Royal Berkshire
- Ambulance: South Central
- UK Parliament: Windsor

Brands Hill is a village in Berkshire, England. It is just on the outskirts of Colnbrook on Bath Road, adjacent to the Langley junction of the M4 motorway. It has grown from a few houses and has never been a historical village. The area is significant for its connecting through road, the Colnbrook bypass, which runs through the heart of Brands Hill, linking the M4, and Heathrow airport. Many of the inhabitants work at Heathrow Airport, and the Royal Mail Depot.

Brands Hill was previously home to a public house on Bath Road, known as the Queen's Arms before its closure but historically known as The Crown Inn, it has been the site of a pub since at least the 18th century. A pub known as The Plough, which was a landmark on the bus routes from Hounslow to Slough, previously existed on London Road and was demolished to make way for a Holiday Inn Express. Colnbrook Garage was previously located at the junction of Bath Road and London Road, and was demolished to make way for flats.

Due to the proximity to London Heathrow Terminal 5, the area offers a few B&Bs including The Airport Guest House and Gibtel, both on the Brands Hill roundabout. There are a few shops in Brands Hill, including an M&S/BP petrol station, a bar in the Holiday Inn Express, and fast food restaurants. Westfield Estate Community Centre is located on Severn Crescent within the Westfield housing estate to the north of Brands Hill.

Crown Meadow wildlife heritage site is located between the Crown Meadow housing estate and a stream called Horton Brook. Colnbrook Recreation Ground offers a children's play area and a permanent grassed football pitch.

== Gallery ==
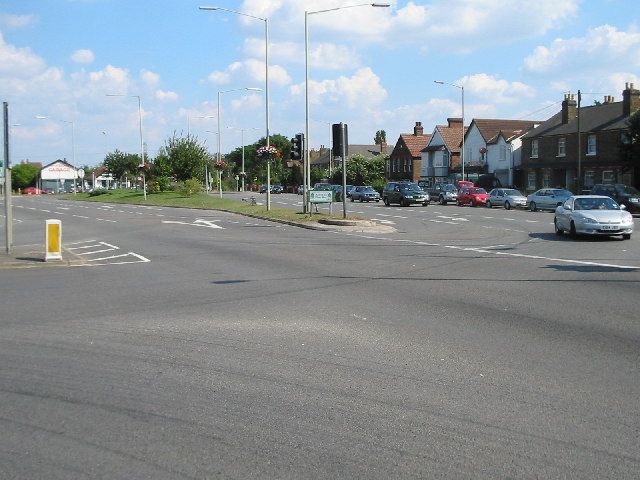
Brands Hill roundabout in 2005

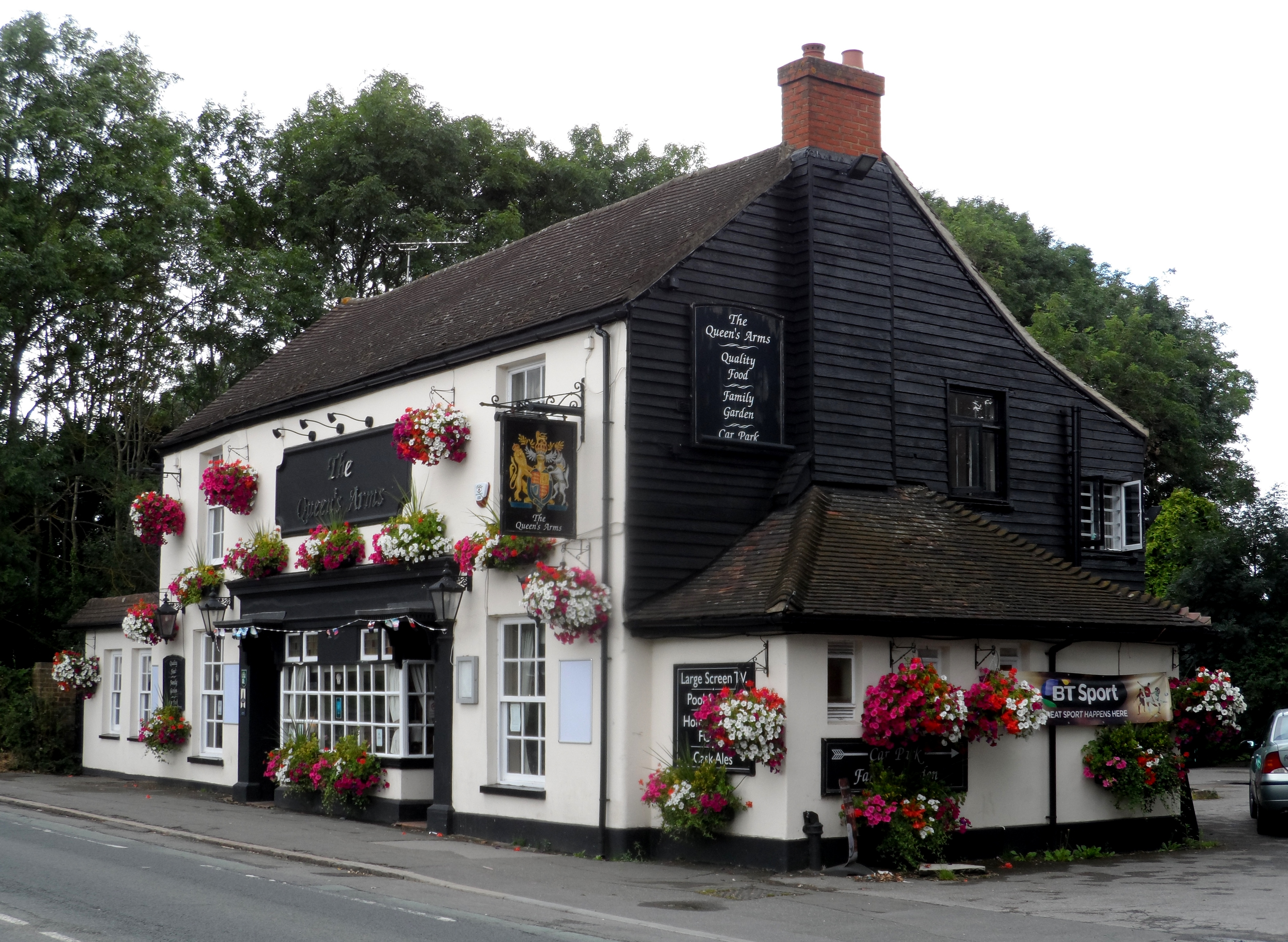
Former Queen's Arms pub on Bath Road, now an Indian restaurant

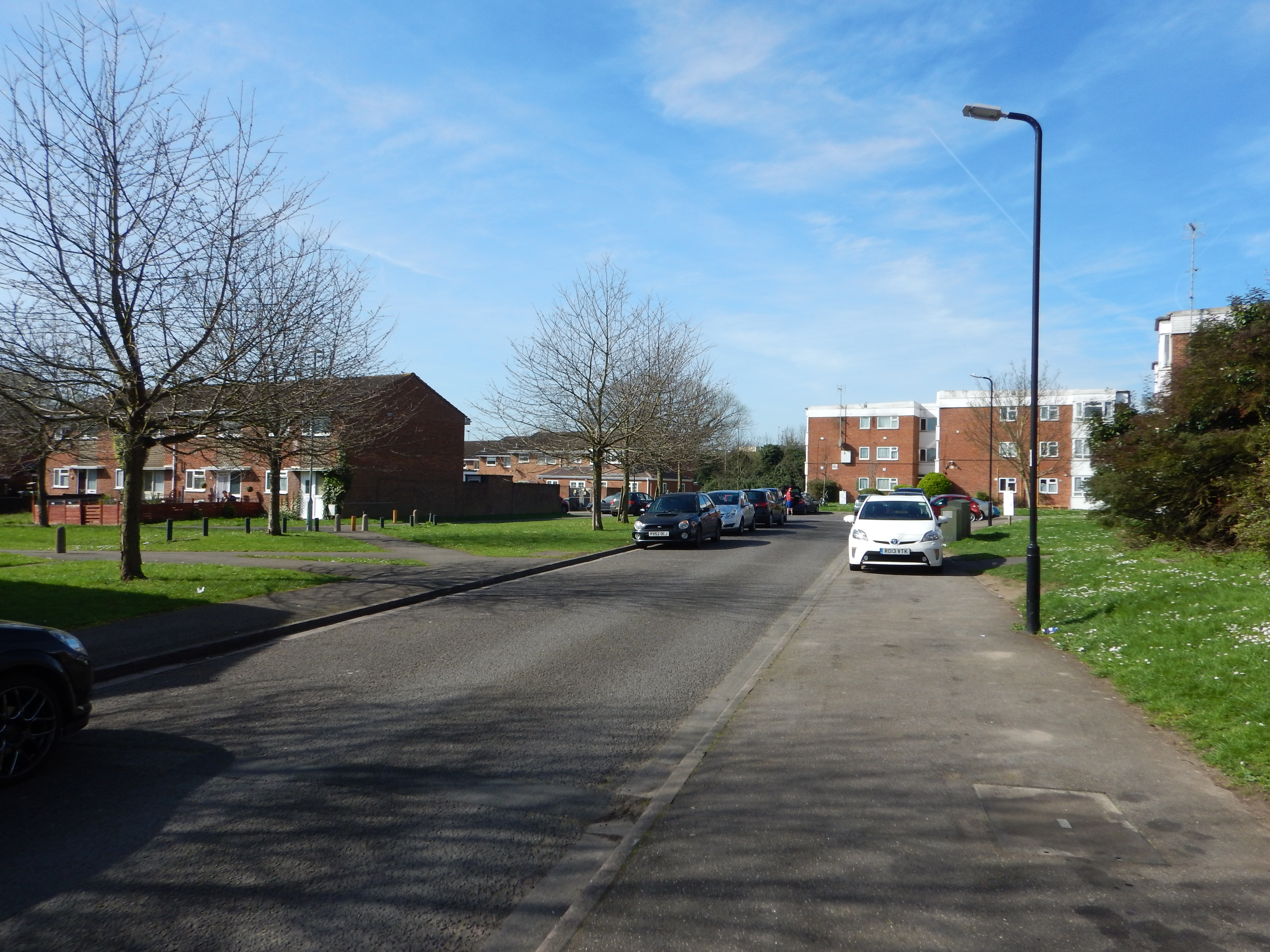
Crown Meadow Estate

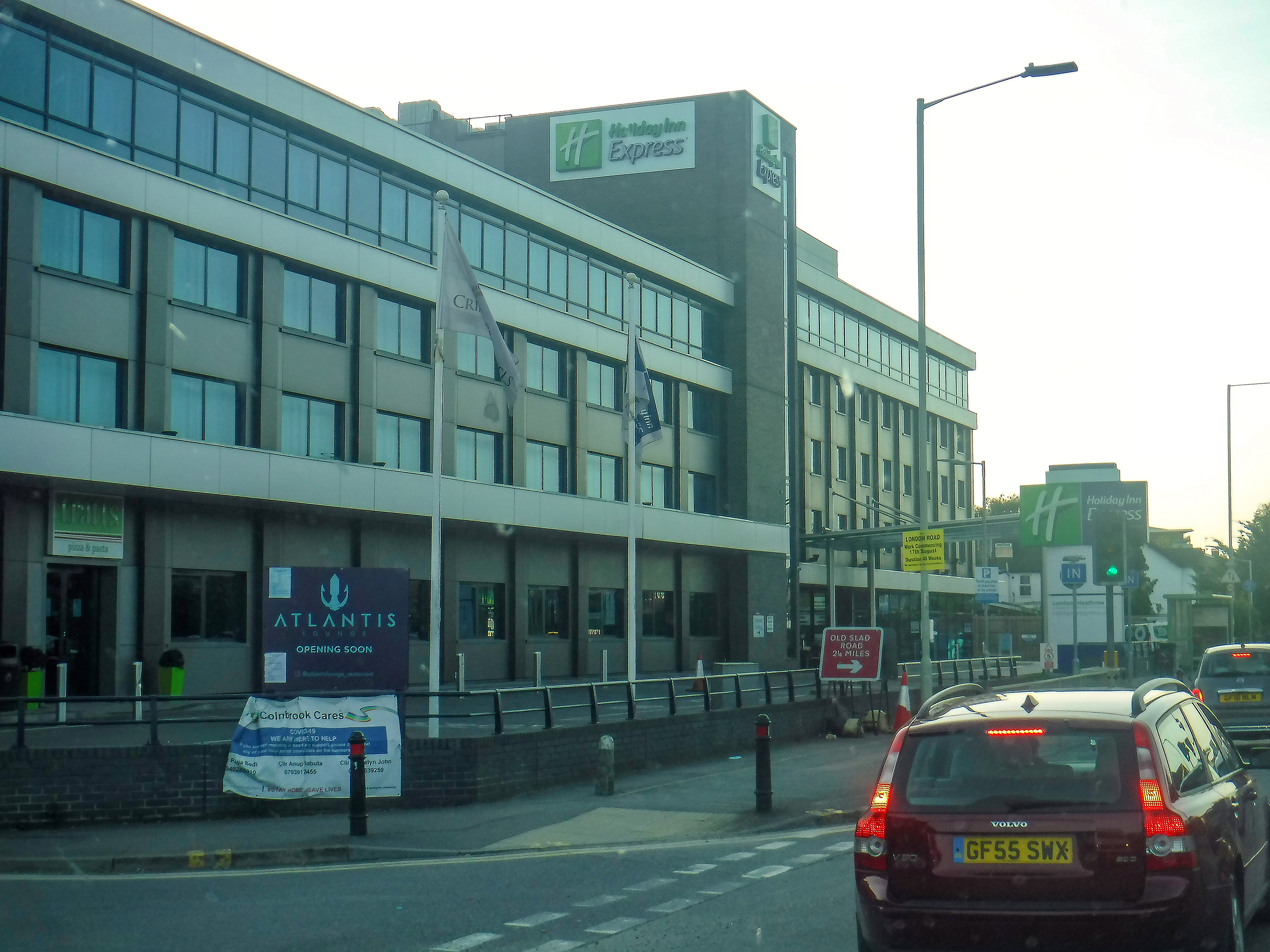
Holiday Inn Express, formerly the site of The Plough public house
