= Brandlingill =

Village in Cumbria, England

Coordinates: 54.62°N 03.36°W

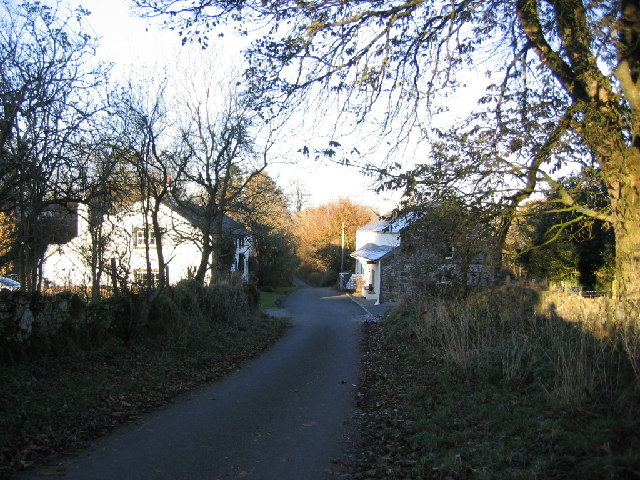
- Brandlingill

- Location in Allerdale, Cumbria Location within Cumbria
- OS grid reference: NY1226
- Civil parish: Blindbothel
- Unitary authority: Cumberland
- Ceremonial county: Cumbria
- Region: North West
- Country: England
- Sovereign state: United Kingdom
- Post town: COCKERMOUTH
- Postcode district: CA13
- Dialling code: 01900
- Police: Cumbria
- Fire: Cumbria
- Ambulance: North West
- UK Parliament: Penrith and Solway

Brandlingill is a hamlet in Cumbria, England.
