= Bragbury End =

Coordinates: 51.874°N 00.159°W

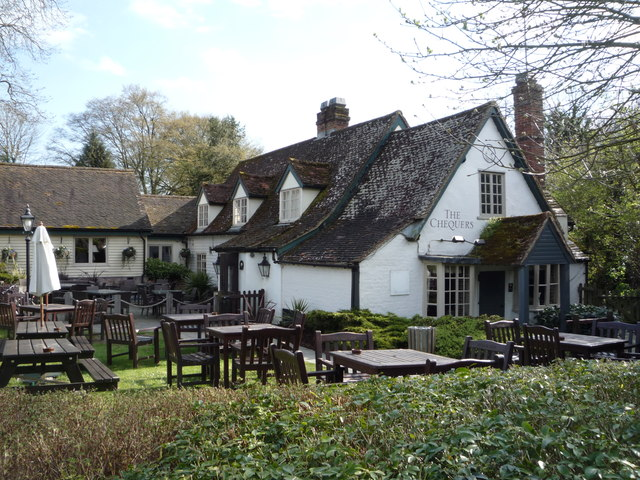
- The Chequers in Bradbury End

- Location within Hertfordshire
- OS grid reference: TL2621
- District: Stevenage
- Shire county: Hertfordshire
- Region: East
- Country: England
- Sovereign state: United Kingdom
- Post town: STEVENAGE
- Postcode district: SG2
- Dialling code: 01438
- Police: Hertfordshire
- Fire: Hertfordshire
- Ambulance: East of England
- UK Parliament: Stevenage

Bragbury End is a hamlet in Hertfordshire, England, and the location of Stevenage Football Club's training ground.

== History ==
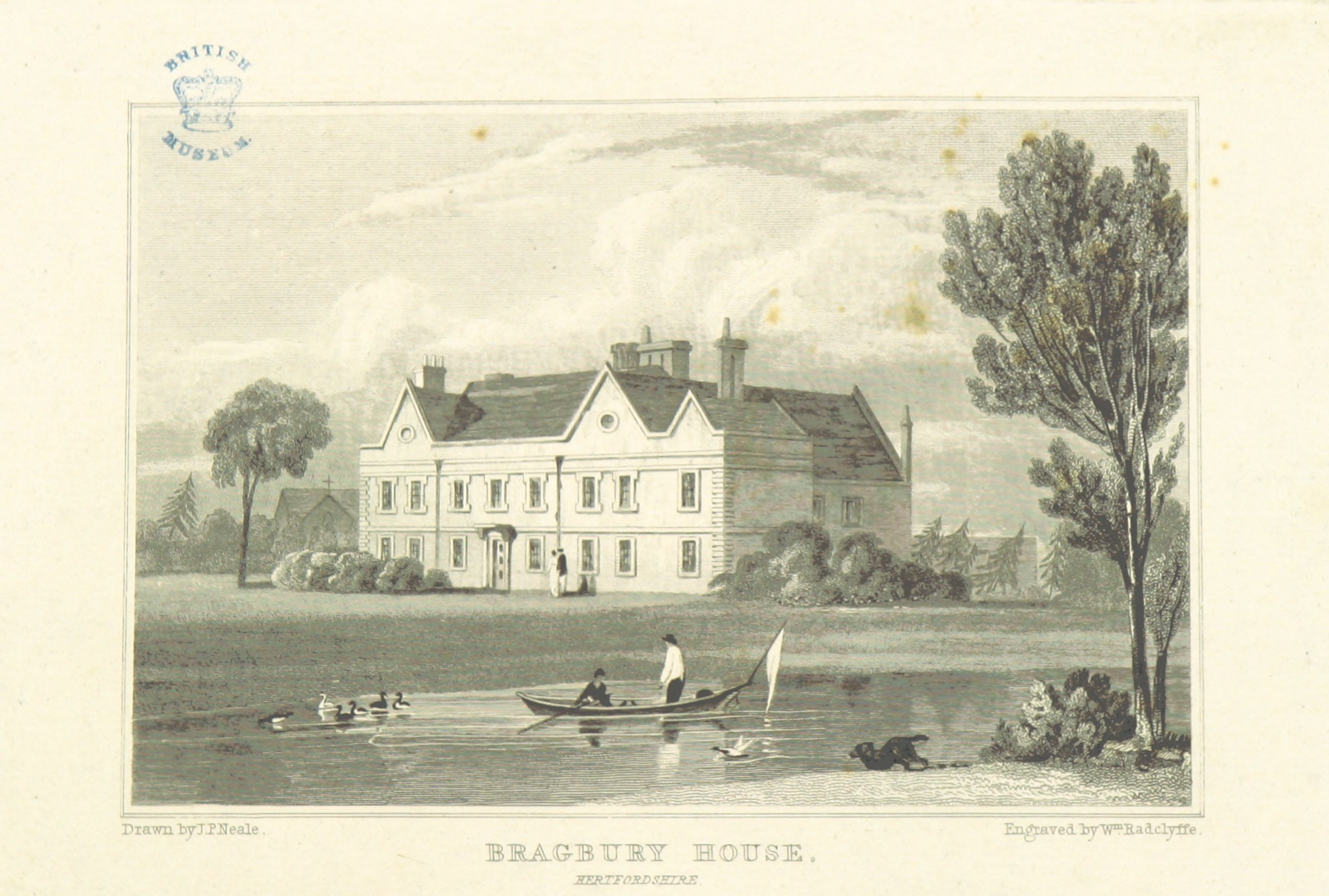
Bragbury House (1818)

The hamlet exists mostly on the site of a former Grade II-listed 45-acre estate called Bradbury, which was built in 1760. The site was acquired during World War II for use by British Aerospace. After 1995, it was converted into housing.
