= Robin Shroot =

English footballer

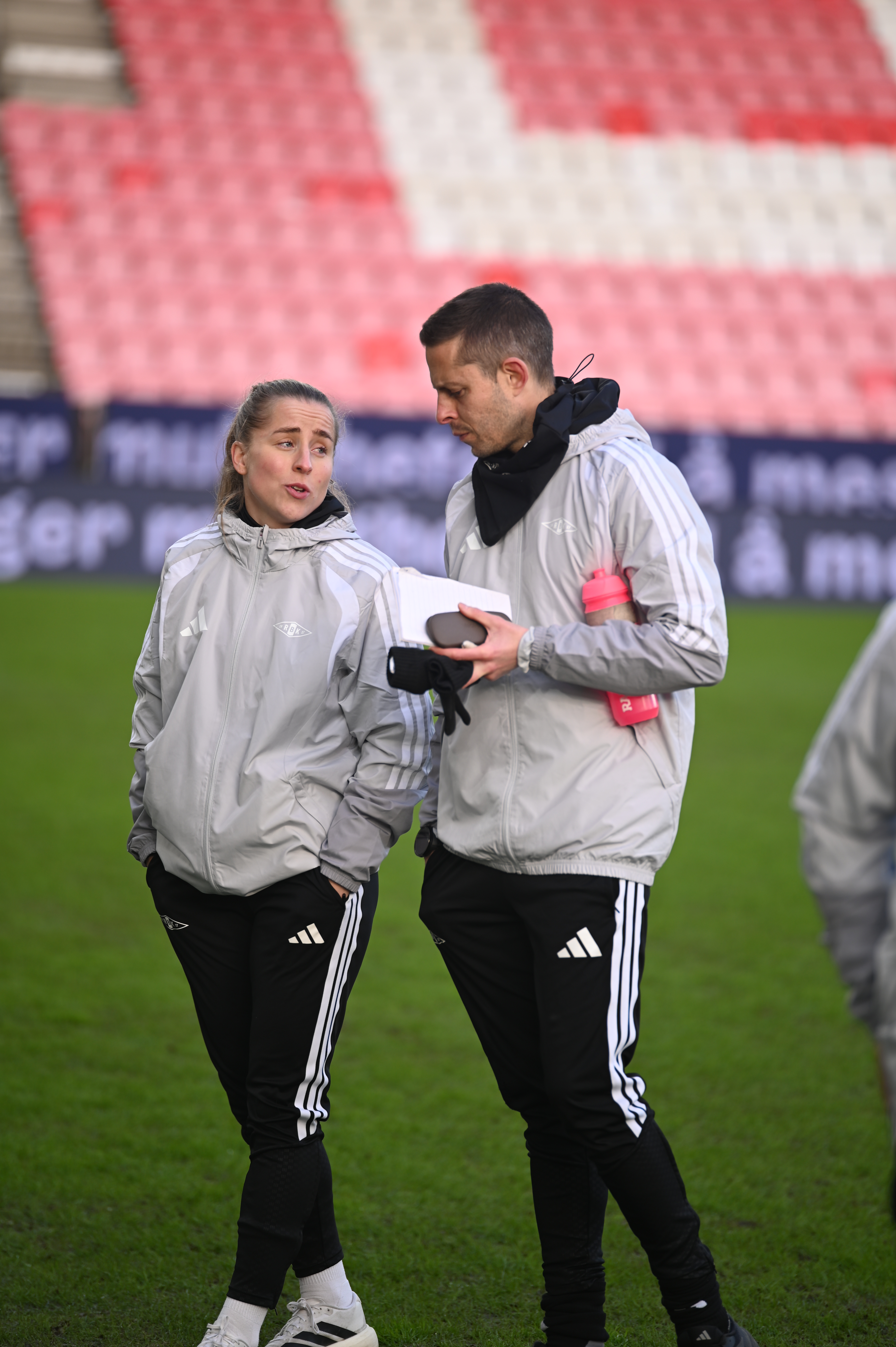
- Shroot (right) in 2026

Personal information
- Full name: Robin Alexander Edward Shroot
- Date of birth: 26 March 1988 (age 38)
- Place of birth: Hammersmith, London, England
- Height: 5 ft 11 in (1.81 m)
- Position: Striker

Youth career
- Wimbledon
- Staines Town

Senior career*
Years	Team	Apps	(Gls)
2005–2006	Staines Town	0	(0)
2006–2008	AFC Wimbledon	19	(6)
2007–2008	→ Harrow Borough (loan)	10	(6)
2008–2009	Harrow Borough	12	(9)
2009–2011	Birmingham City	0	(0)
2009	→ Walsall (loan)	5	(0)
2009	→ Burton Albion (loan)	7	(0)
2010–2011	→ Cheltenham Town (loan)	7	(1)
2011–2014	Stevenage	63	(9)
2014–2015	Hødd	23	(16)
2015	Sogndal	11	(4)
2015–2017	Hødd	48	(19)
2017	→ Viking (loan)	6	(0)
2018	Nashville SC	6	(0)
2019–2020	Hødd	29	(11)
2020	→ Brattvåg (loan)	1	(0)

International career
2008–2009	Northern Ireland U21	4	(0)

Managerial career
- 2020: Hødd (women)
- 2022–2023: Rosenborg BK Kvinner (assistant)
- 2024–: Rosenborg BK Kvinner
- * Club domestic league appearances and goals

Robin Alexander Edward Shroot (born 26 March 1988) is a former professional footballer who played as a striker. He is currently the manager of Rosenborg Kvinner.

Shroot started his career at Wimbledon as an eight-year-old, progressing through the club's youth system before being released at 16. He then spent time at Staines Town's academy, laying a peripheral first-team role during the 2005–06 campaign. In September 2006, Shroot joined AFC Wimbledon, again making a sporadic number of appearances throughout the 2006–07 season. In November 2007, he was loaned out to Harrow Borough on an initial one-month loan deal, later extended to three months. He returned to his parent club in January 2008, playing a part in the side that earned promotion to the Conference South. Shroot signed for Harrow on non-contract terms in September 2008 after failing to agree a contract at AFC Wimbledon.

After impressing during the first half of the 2008–09 campaign, Shroot attracted interest from Birmingham City, and signed a 2 1/2-year contract with the club in January 2009. He made his first-team debut for Birmingham City in the FA Cup third round match against Wolverhampton Wanderers shortly after signing for the club. It was to be Shroot's only first-team appearance for the club. He was loaned out on three occasions during his time at Birmingham; to Walsall, Burton Albion and Cheltenham Town respectively. Shroot was released by Birmingham City when his contract expired at the end of the 2010–11 season. In July 2011, Shroot signed for League One club Stevenage on a two-year contract following a successful trial. He has also represented Northern Ireland at under-21 level.

== Club career ==
=== Non-league football ===
Shroot was born in London. He began his football career as an eight-year-old with Wimbledon, remaining with the club until released at 16. He then joined Staines Town's academy, which operated in association with Kingston College. He scored the only goal in the 2006 Middlesex Premier Cup final, the first time the club had reached the final, and contributed to the side reaching the Southern Youth League championship play-off and (as Kingston College) the final of the English Schools' Football Association U-18 Colleges' Trophy. Shroot never played for Staines' Isthmian League Premier Division team, though he was an occasional unused substitute, and scored in the final as the club won the Southern Combination Cup, a first-team competition.

In September 2006, Shroot joined AFC Wimbledon, also of the Isthmian League Premier. The club described him as a "skilful ball-playing winger who likes to take on opponents and deliver telling crosses". He made his league debut, showing "plenty of promise" as he played the first 65 minutes of the 2–1 win at Ashford Town (Middlesex) on 26 September 2006. In the 2006–07 season he made two starts and five substitute appearances in the league without scoring. In November 2007, Shroot joined Harrow Borough, also of the Isthmian League Premier, on loan, initially for a month. He made his debut on 10 November 2007 in a 2–1 defeat at Margate. His spell with Harrow was extended to three months, though disrupted by injury, and brought him six league goals from ten games. Shroot finished the 2007–08 season with another six league goals for AFC Wimbledon from five starts and seven substitute appearances, contributing to the club's promotion to the Conference South. Shroot's contract expired at the end of that season. The club made him an offer which he chose not to accept, so he became available for transfer; manager Terry Brown felt that the player's representatives did not want him to stay with the club.

Under the Bosman ruling, because of the player's age, compensation would be payable when he signed a contract with another club, but he would be allowed to play on non-contract terms, and in September 2008 he rejoined Harrow Borough on such a basis, with a view to regaining fitness following a summer operation. At Harrow he was reunited with player-coach Jamie Lawrence, with whom he had worked for three years at Lawrence's Tooting academy for semi-professional footballers. Though he failed to score in his first four games back with Harrow, he followed up with nine goals in eight league games, performances which attracted interest from potential purchasers and attention from opposition defenders alike.

=== Birmingham City ===
In mid-December 2008, Shroot had a trial with Football League Championship club Birmingham City; he trained with the first-team group and scored in a friendly against Cheltenham Town. Harrow manager, former Birmingham player David Howell, was unhappy about the motives of the player's agent, suggesting he wanted "to put Robin out there for the highest bidder". Nevertheless, Shroot joined Birmingham on 2 January 2009, signing a 2 1/2-year contract with a one-year option, for what was described as a "nominal" fee.

Shroot made his first-team debut on 13 January 2009, playing the whole of the FA Cup third round defeat to Wolverhampton Wanderers. In March 2009, he joined League One club Walsall on loan for one month with a view to gaining first-team experience in League football. He made his debut in the Football League as a second-half substitute in Walsall's 2–0 defeat at Southend United. The good form of Walsall's other wide players meant Shroot was unable to force his way into the starting eleven, so he returned from the loan spell a week before it was due to end, making five substitute appearances.

Shroot joined Burton Albion on a season-long loan on 1 July 2009, though Birmingham retained the option to recall him in the January 2010 transfer window. He made his debut for the club on the opening day of the season, playing the first 67 minutes of a 3–1 defeat away to Shrewsbury Town. The player returned to Birmingham when the loan was terminated prematurely "in the best interests of both parties" on 6 October 2009, though formally he remained a Burton player until the transfer window opened in January 2010.

The player signed for League Two club Cheltenham Town on loan at the start of the 2010–11 season, initially on an emergency basis to ensure his availability for the opening match of the season, with the intention of extending the loan until January 2011. He was named among the substitutes as Cheltenham drew at Gillingham, but did not make an appearance. Shroot scored his first Football League goal against Accrington Stanley in October, and went on to make 11 appearances for Cheltenham in all competitions. Although keen to extend the loan, he returned to Birmingham in January 2011, and was released when his contract expired at the end of the season.

=== Stevenage ===
In July 2011, Shroot had a trial at League One club Stevenage, during which he scored the only goal of the game in Stevenage's 1–0 win against a Fulham XI side, coming on as a substitute in the 71st minute and scoring ten minutes later. The trial proved successful, and he signed a two-year contract with the club on 26 July. Shroot made his Stevenage debut in the club's first game of the 2011–12 campaign, playing 71 minutes in a 0–0 home draw with Exeter City. He scored his first goal for the club in a 3–0 victory over Stourbridge in the FA Cup on 3 December, scoring the final goal of the game in injury-time. Shroot's first league goal for Stevenage followed later on in the month, on 26 December, in the club's 6–1 away win at Colchester United. He scored the first goal of the match after just nine minutes, latching onto Chris Beardsley's cross to score from six yards out. He went on to score twice within the space of a week in March 2012, scoring two late equalising goals in games against Huddersfield Town and Exeter City respectively. Shroot scored four times in 34 appearances during his first season with the club.

Ahead of the 2012–13 campaign, Shroot scored ten times in pre-season, including six in two matches during the club's tour of Ireland in July 2012. He began the season by coming on as a second-half substitute in a 1–1 draw with Carlisle United, scoring Stevenage's equaliser with just two minutes remaining. Shroot then went on to score in four consecutive games throughout September 2012, despite predominantly featuring as a substitute. His form during the period reportedly attracted the interest of SPL side Celtic. He scored his sixth goal of the season in the club's 2–1 away win over Notts County on 2 October, again coming on as a substitute and scoring the winning goal in injury-time. In November 2012, Stevenage released a statement announcing they had rejected Shroot's request to be made available for loan – stating the player had not been selected in the club's previous four games and consequently requested the loan move. Shroot denied that he had requested a loan move, and in December 2012, he signed a two-year contract extension with Stevenage, keeping him contracted to the club until 2015. Shroot scored in Stevenage's 2–1 home defeat to Crawley Town on 15 December, just two days after signing a new contract. He was stretchered off in Stevenage's 1–0 home win over Hartlepool United on 1 April 2013, after suffering an ankle injury that ultimately ended his season prematurely. He made 29 appearances in all competitions during the campaign, 15 of which as a substitute, scoring seven times.

Ahead of the 2013–14 campaign, Shroot scored twice in seven friendly matches in a 5–2 win over Mansfield Town and another in a 5–0 win at Hitchin Town. Having been included for the first three matches, mostly twice as a substitute, Shroot made an assist for James Dunne "when he squared the ball to Dunne" to score the finisher, giving Stevenage their first win of the season, in a 1–0 win over Notts County. However, Shroot first team opportunities has become increasingly limited after not featuring in a match or the substitute bench. This just came when Shroot made a lazy back pass, allowing Leon Clarke to score in a 1–0 loss against Coventry City. To add an insult to an injury, Stevenage winless run was extended to six games. For the second time in 12 months, Shroot was placed on the transfer list, like he requested. In the January transfer window, the club expected Shroot, along with other transfer-listed players, to be sold following teammate Luke Freeman is on his way out. Shortly after the announcement, reports in Norway stated Shroot went on trial with a Norwegian club, which believed to be Sarpsborg 08.

On 27 March 2014, it was announced on the Stevenage website that Shroot had left the club by mutual consent and is intend to join a new club in Norway.

=== IL Hødd ===
The following day, 28 March 2014, Shroot signed a one-year contract with Norwegian 1. Divisjon side IL Hødd.

Despite missing some of the season through injury Shroot scored 16 goals in 23 games (including 3 hat tricks) and was their top scorer for the season and the second highest scorer in the League.

Shroot signed for Sogndal who had been relegated to Division 1 during the close season. In his first League game Shroot opened the scoring for his new team who went on to win 3–1.

On 30 November 2017, Nashville SC announced Shroot as one of the club's first 4 signings.

On 19 February 2019, it was announced that Shroot had rejoined Hødd, now of the 2. Divisjon, on a two-year deal.

On 1 September 2020, Shroot joined fellow 2. Divisjon side Brattvåg on loan for the rest of the season.

== International career ==
Shroot qualifies to play international football for Northern Ireland because his grandmother is from that country. While still a youngster at Wimbledon, he wrote to then manager Lawrie Sanchez to tell him his international ambitions lay with Northern Ireland. He was capped at under-19 and under-20 level, and featured in the starting XI for Northern Ireland Under-19s in all three of their matches in the 2007 Milk Cup Elite Section. With a 2–2 draw against Turkey and a 3–2 win over Chile Under-19s, Northern Ireland qualified for the final. However, they fell at the final hurdle and were defeated 4–1 by Israel. Shroot's debut for the under-21s came in November 2008 when he played the first half of a 3–1 defeat of their Scottish counterparts, and he went on to win four caps at that level.

== Coaching career ==
Ahead of the 2020 season, he was employed by Hødd outside his playing capacities, as manager of Hødd's women's team. After finishing his contract with Hødd, Shroot joined Rosenborg Kvinner as academy development manager.

== Personal life ==
Shroot was born to a Jewish father from London's East End. He was educated at Alleyn's School in Dulwich, south London, achieving "good GCSE and A-Level results". He played non-league cricket for the Alleyn Ad hoc XI, many of whose players are former pupils of the school. Before his move to Birmingham, he had coached at a South London junior football club, Balham Blazers, and managed their under-13 side. He intended to maintain his involvement with the club when his Birmingham commitments permitted. In 2012, Shroot told The Jewish Chronicle that he would like to represent the United Kingdom at the Maccabiah Games.

In September 2013, Shroot began to write his own column in The Comet.

== Career statistics ==
As of 5 December 2017.

Appearances and goals by club, season and competition
Club	Season	League^{[A]}		FA Cup		League Cup		Other (Note: Includes FA Trophy, Football League Trophy, play-offs and play-off to Tippeligaen.)		Total	
Club	Season	Apps	Goals	Apps	Goals	Apps	Goals	Apps	Goals	Apps	Goals
AFC Wimbledon	2006–07	7	0	1	0	0	0	4	0	12	0
AFC Wimbledon	2007–08	12	6	3	0	0	0	0	0	15	6
AFC Wimbledon	Total	19	6	4	0	0	0	4	0	27	6
Harrow Borough	2007–08	10	6	0	0	0	0	0	0	10	6
Harrow Borough	2008–09	12	9	0	0	0	0	2	1	14	10
Harrow Borough	Total	22	15	0	0	0	0	2	1	24	16
Birmingham City	2008–09	0	0	1	0	0	0	0	0	1	0
Walsall (loan)	2008–09	5	0	0	0	0	0	0	0	5	0
Burton Albion (loan)	2009–10	7	0	0	0	0	0	0	0	7	0
Cheltenham Town (loan)	2010–11	7	1	2	0	1	0	1	0	11	1
Stevenage	2011–12	25	3	5	1	1	0	3	0	34	4
Stevenage	2012–13	26	6	0	0	2	0	1	1	29	7
Stevenage	2013–14	10	0	0	0	2	0	0	0	12	0
Stevenage	Total	63	9	5	1	5	0	4	1	77	11
Hødd	2014	23	16	–		1	3	0	0	24	19
Sogndal	2015	11	4	–		1	0	0	0	12	4
Hødd	2015	9	1	–		0	0	1	0	10	1
Hødd	2016	30	12	–		1	0	0	0	31	12
Hødd	Total	39	13	–		1	0	1	0	41	13
Viking (loan)	2017	6	0	–		2	1	–		8	1
Hødd	2017	9	6	–		0	0	–		9	6
Career total		211	70	12	1	11	4	12	2	246	86

== Honours ==
Staines Town

- Southern Youth League (East): 2006
- Middlesex Premier Cup: 2006
- Southern Combination Cup: 2006

AFC Wimbledon

- Isthmian League Premier Division runners-up: 2008
