= Matt Ball (footballer) =

Northern Irish footballer (born 1993)

Personal information
- Full name: Matthew Ball
- Date of birth: 26 March 1993 (age 33)
- Place of birth: Welwyn Garden City, England
- Height: 5 ft 10 in (1.78 m)
- Positions: Holding midfielder; attacking midfielder

Youth career
- 2005–2010: Norwich City

Senior career*
Years	Team	Apps	(Gls)
2010–2012	Norwich City	0	(0)
2012	→ Macclesfield Town (loan)	0	(0)
2012–2014	Stevenage	2	(0)
2013	→ Farnborough (loan)	7	(1)
2013–2014	→ Boreham Wood (loan)	21	(4)
2014	→ Farnborough (loan)	19	(4)
2014	Farnborough	12	(2)
2014–2015	Wealdstone	24	(6)
2015	Albuquerque Sol		
2015–2016	Wealdstone	24	(3)
2016	→ Farnborough (loan)	4	(0)
2016–2017	St Albans	13	(2)
2017–2018	Hendon	47	(9)
2018	→ Kings Langley (loan)	9	(3)
2018–2020	Biggleswade Town		
2020–2021	Hendon	7	(0)
2022	Welwyn Garden City	8	(1)
2023	Cockfosters	4	(0)
2023–2025	Stotfold	37	(9)

International career
2010–2011	Northern Ireland U17	6	(1)
2011	Northern Ireland U19	3	(0)
2011–2013	Northern Ireland U21	6	(0)
- * Club domestic league appearances and goals as of 17:26, 16 October 2025 (UTC)

Matthew Ball (born 26 March 1993) is a professional footballer who plays as a holding midfielder or attacking midfielder.

Ball joined the Norwich City academy in 2005 and progressed through the youth system to sign his first professional contract in May 2011. He moved to Stevenage in July 2012, making his Football League debut and spending loan spells at Farnborough and Boreham Wood. He subsequently joined Farnborough permanently before signing for Conference South club Wealdstone in October 2014 for an undisclosed fee, making 62 appearances and scoring 11 goals. During this period, he also had a brief spell in the United States with Albuquerque Sol.

He spent the first half of the 2016–17 season with St Albans before joining Isthmian League Premier Division club Hendon in January 2017. In May 2018, he signed for Biggleswade Town, scoring 18 goals across two seasons in a holding midfield role. He later played for Welwyn Garden City, Cockfosters, and Stotfold in non-League football. Internationally, Ball represented Northern Ireland at under-17, under-19, and under-21 level.

== Early life ==
Born in Welwyn Garden City, Hertfordshire, Ball attended St Columba's College and Easton College. He began playing football with local club Welwyn Pegasus at under-6 level, spending six to seven years there. After attracting interest from Ipswich Town and Tottenham Hotspur, he joined the Norwich City academy at the age of 12 following a successful trial. His father, Tim, played for Stevenage Borough for three years between 1984 and 1987, while his brother Dominic, is also a professional footballer.

== Club career ==
=== Norwich City ===
While part of Norwich City's youth system, Ball captained the academy team during the 2010–11 season and featured regularly for the reserves, scoring eight goals in 14 matches. In October 2010, he received his first-team call-up, appearing as an unused substitute in a 2–1 defeat to Crystal Palace. He signed his professional contract, a one-year deal, in the summer of 2011, with manager Paul Lambert praising his attitude and readiness to step up to senior football.

During the 2011–12 season, Ball continued to play regularly for the reserves but did not make a senior appearance. He joined League Two club Macclesfield Town on a one-month loan on 15 March 2012, though did not feature and returned to Norwich at the end of the spell. Ball was released by the club at the conclusion of the 2011–12 season, without making a first-team appearance.

=== Stevenage ===
Ahead of the 2012–13 season, Ball joined League One club Stevenage on trial and subsequently signed a two-year contract on 19 July 2012. Having not made a first-team appearance during the first half of the season, he was loaned to Conference South club Farnborough on a one-month deal. He made seven appearances and scored once in a 1–0 away win over Eastbourne Borough. Ball returned to Stevenage and made his senior debut for the club on 20 April 2013, coming on as a 75th-minute substitute in a 3–0 defeat to Swindon Town.

Ball joined Conference South club Boreham Wood on a six-month loan on 16 August 2013, scoring twice on his debut the following day in a 2–0 victory against Tonbridge Angels. He went on to make 29 appearances and score five goals during the first half of the season. Following the expiry of his loan, Ball rejoined Farnborough on loan for the remainder of the 2013–14 season, where he scored four times in 19 appearances. He was released by Stevenage in May 2014.

=== Farnborough and Wealdstone ===
Ball signed for Conference South club Farnborough on a permanent basis ahead of the 2014–15 season following a successful trial during pre-season. He scored twice in 15 appearances during the opening two months of the season, both goals coming in a 2–1 away victory against Wealdstone. He subsequently joined Wealdstone for an undisclosed fee on 22 October 2014, making his debut in a 6–0 Middlesex Senior Cup victory over Hampton & Richmond Borough. He finished the season with six goals in 28 appearances.

In May 2015, Ball joined USL Premier Development League club Albuquerque Sol, helping the team reach the play-offs, where they were defeated by FC Tucson in the qualifying round. He returned to Wealdstone for the 2015–16 season, making 34 appearances and scoring five times, although he did not feature during the final six weeks of the season.

=== St Albans and Hendon ===
Ball signed for National League South club St Albans City on 15 June 2016. He scored twice on his first start in a 3–0 away win against Weston-super-Mare on 29 August 2016. After registering four goals in 23 appearances, he joined Isthmian League Premier Division club Hendon on a dual-registration deal in January 2017. Ball scored seven goals in 18 appearances during the second half of the 2016–17 season, before signing permanently with Hendon in June 2017. He went on to make 40 appearances and score four goals during the 2017–18 season, which also included a two-month loan spell at Kings Langley.

=== Further spells in non-League ===
Ball joined Southern League Premier Division Central club Biggleswade Town on 22 May 2018. He scored 12 goals from a holding midfield role during the 2018–19 season and added six goals in 40 appearances in 2019–20, before the season was curtailed in March 2020 due to the COVID-19 pandemic. He returned to Hendon in July 2020, making 10 appearances before the campaign was again abandoned amid COVID-19 pandemic restrictions. After recovering from a knee injury, Ball signed for his hometown club Welwyn Garden City on 2 March 2022, aiming to assist the club's pursuit of a Southern League Division One Central play-off position. He scored once in eight appearances, but despite qualifying, the club were ineligible to compete in the play-offs due to ground grading regulations.

After not playing competitively during the 2022–23 season, Ball joined Cockfosters of the Spartan South Midlands League in September 2023. He made five appearances before signing for Stotfold in December 2023. Across the 2023–24 and 2024–25 seasons, he made 40 appearances and scored nine goals for the club.

== International career ==
Ball represented Northern Ireland at under-17, under-19 and under-21 level.

== Style of play ==
Ball began his career as an attacking midfielder before transitioning to a holding midfield role. He noted that adapting to non-League football required a shift in approach, moving from a creative, playmaking role in academy football to a more physical and disciplined holding position, which he later established himself in at Biggleswade Town.

== Personal life ==
Ball earned a degree in Business Management from the Open University. While continuing his semi-professional playing career, he also began working as a FIFA-licensed football agent.

== Career statistics ==
Appearances and goals by club, season and competition
Club	Season	League			FA Cup		League Cup		Other		Total	
Club	Season	Division	Apps	Goals	Apps	Goals	Apps	Goals	Apps	Goals	Apps	Goals
Norwich City	2010–11	Championship	0	0	0	0	0	0	0	0	0	0
Norwich City	2011–12	Premier League	0	0	0	0	0	0	0	0	0	0
Norwich City	Total		0	0	0	0	0	0	0	0	0	0
Macclesfield Town (loan)	2011–12	League Two	0	0	—		—		0	0	0	0
Stevenage	2012–13	League One	2	0	0	0	0	0	0	0	2	0
Stevenage	2013–14	League Two	0	0	—		0	0	0	0	0	0
Stevenage	Total		2	0	0	0	0	0	0	0	2	0
Farnborough (loan)	2012–13	Conference South	7	1	0	0	—		0	0	7	1
Boreham Wood (loan)	2013–14	Conference South	21	4	6	1	—		2 (Note: One appearance in FA Trophy; one appearance in Herts Senior Cup)	0	29	5
Farnborough (loan)	2013–14	Conference South	19	4	—		—		0	0	19	4
Farnborough	2014–15	Conference South	12	2	2	0	—		1 (Note: Appearance in Hampshire Senior Cup)	0	15	2
Farnborough	Total		31	6	2	0	0	0	1	0	34	6
Wealdstone	2014–15	Conference South	24	6	—		—		4 (Note: Two appearances in FA Trophy; two appearances in Middlesex Senior Cup)	0	28	6
Albuquerque Sol	2015	USL Premier Development League	Season statistics not known									
Wealdstone	2015–16	National League South	24	3	5	1	—		5 (Note: Two appearances in FA Trophy; three appearances and one goal in Middlesex Senior Cup)	1	34	5
St Albans City	2016–17	National League South	13	2	4	0	—		6 (Note: Two appearances in FA Trophy; one appearance in Herts Charity Cup; three appearances and two goals in Herts Senior Cup)	2	23	4
Hendon	2016–17	Isthmian Premier Division	18	7	—		—		2	0	20	7
Hendon	2017–18	Isthmian Premier Division	29	2	0	0	—		11	2	40	9
Hendon	Total		47	9	0	0	0	0	13	2	60	11
Kings Langley (loan)	2017–18	Southern League Premier Division	9	3	—		—		2 (Note: Appearances in Herts Senior Cup)	1	11	4
Biggleswade Town	2018–19	Southern League Premier Division Central	Season statistics incomplete									
Biggleswade Town	2019–20	Southern League Premier Division Central	29	4	3	0	—		8 (Note: Four appearances in FA Trophy; two appearances and one goal in Southern League Cup; two appearances and one goal in Bedfordshire Senior Cup)	2	40	6
Biggleswade Town	Total		29	4	3	0	0	0	8	2	40	6
Hendon	2020–21	Southern League Premier Division South	7	0	1	0	—		2 (Note: One appearance in FA Trophy; one appearance in London Senior Cup)	0	10	0
Welwyn Garden City	2021–22	Southern League Division One Central	8	1	—		—		—		8	1
Cockfosters	2023–24	SSML Premier Division	4	0	—		—		1 (Note: Appearance in FA Vase)	0	5	0
Stotfold	2023–24	Southern League Division One Central	19	5	—		—		1 (Note: Appearance(s) in Bedfordshire Senior Cup)	0	20	5
Stotfold	2024–25	Southern League Division One Central	18	4	0	0	—		2	0	20	4
Stotfold	Total		37	9	0	0	0	0	3	0	40	9
Career totals			263	50	21	2	0	0	47	8	331	60
