= Lee Hills (footballer) =

English footballer

Personal information
- Full name: Lee Mark Hills
- Date of birth: 3 April 1990 (age 36)
- Place of birth: Croydon, England
- Height: 5 ft 10 in (1.78 m)
- Position: Defender

Youth career
- 1999–2004: Wimbledon
- 2004–2005: Arsenal
- 2005–2007: Crystal Palace

Senior career*
Years	Team	Apps	(Gls)
2007–2012	Crystal Palace	45	(1)
2008	→ Colchester United (loan)	2	(0)
2009	→ Oldham Athletic (loan)	3	(0)
2012	→ Southend United (loan)	7	(0)
2012–2013	Stevenage	15	(0)
2013–2016	Whitehawk	60	(1)

International career
2008	England U18	1	(0)
2008–2009	England U19	6	(0)
- * Club domestic league appearances and goals as of 11:58, 25 March 2017 (UTC)

Lee Mark Hills (born 3 April 1990) is an English footballer who last played as a defender for Whitehawk.

Hills started his career at Wimbledon at the age of nine, spending five years at the club's academy before briefly joining Arsenal. In 2005, he joined Crystal Palace, progressing through the youth ranks before making his first-team debut at the age of 17. Following his breakthrough season during the 2007–08 campaign, Hills was loaned out to Colchester United in November 2008, although only made two appearances. He also had a brief loan spell at Oldham Athletic in 2009. Towards the latter stages of the 2009–10 season, Hills suffered a knee injury that would ultimately keep him sidelined for the best part of two years. In March 2012, he joined Southend United on loan for the remainder of the 2011–12 campaign. On returning to Palace, he was told he would be released when his contract expired. In July 2012, Hills signed for League One club Stevenage on a free transfer, but would move to Whitehawk just over a year later. He has also represented England at both U18 and U19 level.

== Club career ==
=== Crystal Palace ===
Hills began his career at Wimbledon's youth academy, joining the club at the age of nine and progressing through the youth ranks for several years. He left Wimbledon in 2004 following the club's relocation to Milton Keynes. and shortly afterwards joined Arsenal, spending less than a year at the club's academy. In the summer of 2005, Hills was invited to train at Crystal Palace's academy, and subsequently signed a two-year scholarship deal at the club. After spending two years playing frequently for Palace's U18 side, Hills was drafted into the first-team in October 2007. He made his debut at the age of 17, starting in Crystal Palace's 2–0 home defeat to Watford on 28 October 2007. Two months later, Hills appeared in the club's 2–1 away victory at Queens Park Rangers, and would go on to feature regularly throughout December 2007 and January 2008 during a spell that witnessed Palace rise up the Championship table. Hills scored his first professional goal in Palace's 1–1 draw with Bristol City on 18 February 2008, netting with a left-footed volley to give Palace the lead on the hour mark. He made 13 appearances during the 2007–08 campaign, scoring once.

He started the club's first three games of the 2008–09 season, but would not feature again for Palace for another four months following a 4–2 away defeat to Reading in late August 2008. In November 2008, Hills was loaned out to League One club Colchester United for a month, making two appearances during the brief loan agreement. He suffered an injury in his second appearance for the club, Colchester's 2–1 defeat to Peterborough United, and ultimately returned to his parent club earlier than arranged. He featured sporadically for Palace throughout the second half of the season, and made 15 appearances for the club in all competitions. Hills' first appearance of the 2009–10 season came in a 4–1 home victory over Blackpool on 3 October 2009, coming on as an 86th-minute substitute in the match. He made three further appearances, all as a second-half substitute, before joining Oldham Athletic on a one-month loan in November 2009. He made his debut for Oldham in a 2–0 home loss to Leeds United in the FA Cup, and went on to make four appearances during the loan spell. In his final game for Oldham, Hills received the first red card of his career, for two bookable offences, in a 3–0 defeat to Walsall. Hills went on to play much more regularly for Palace during the latter stages of the 2009–10 season, making 19 appearances. However, he suffered a knee injury in Palace's 1–1 draw away to Derby County in April 2010, and was substituted in the 33rd minute. The game proved to be his last for the club.

The injury would ultimately sideline Hills for the best part of two years – as the player missed the whole of the 2010–11 season, as well as over three-quarters of the 2011–12 campaign. In March 2012, Hills was loaned out to promotion chasing League Two side Southend United for the remainder of the season, in order to regain match fitness. He made his first appearance for nearly two years in Southend's 2–0 away win against Burton Albion a day after signing, and went on to make eight appearances for the club as Southend narrowly lost to Crewe Alexandra in the two-legged play-off semi-finals. Hills was released by Palace when his contract expired in May 2012. On being released by the club, Hills stated – "I love Palace. I've been there for eight years, so from that point it is disappointing. But it is time for me to have a new challenge and go out and play somewhere every week". During his five-year tenure at Palace, Hills made 47 appearances for the club in all competitions, scoring one goal.

=== Stevenage ===
In July 2012, Hills joined League One side Stevenage on trial, playing in the club's pre-season friendly draw with Boreham Wood. After impressing during his trial period, Hills signed a three-year contract with the club, joining on a free transfer. The first three months of Hills' Stevenage career were disrupted by injury, eventually making his first-team debut in a 4–1 away defeat to Sheffield United in November 2012. Further injuries meant Hills appeared sporadically during the second half of the season, impressing in Stevenage's 4–0 victory over Sheffield United on 16 March 2013. He made eleven appearances during the campaign.

=== Whitehawk ===
Struggling to break into the first team, Stevenage and Hills mutually agreed to the termination of his contract, and he dropped down three divisions to join Whitehawk in the Conference South. Hills was appointed team captain at Whitehawk and was named at left back in the Conference South league team of the season for 2014–2015, alongside teammates Nick Arnold and Sam Deering. In the first half of the opening game of the 2015–2016 season at Hayes & Yeading, Hills was carried off with cruciate ligament damage. He never appeared again for The Hawks and was released at the end of the season.

== International career ==
Hills has also represented England at U18 and U19 level.

== Personal life ==
He attended Christ Church School and Whitgift School in Croydon.

He now works as a Cybersecurity Recruiter.

== Career statistics ==
As of 10 August 2013.

Club	Season	League^{[A]}		FA Cup		League Cup		Other^{[B]}		Total	
Club	Season	Apps	Goals	Apps	Goals	Apps	Goals	Apps	Goals	Apps	Goals
Crystal Palace	2007–08	12	1	1	0	0	0	0	0	13	1
Crystal Palace	2008–09	14	0	0	0	1	0	0	0	15	0
Crystal Palace	2009–10	19	0	0	0	0	0	0	0	19	0
Crystal Palace	2010–11	0	0	0	0	0	0	0	0	0	0
Crystal Palace	2011–12	0	0	0	0	0	0	0	0	0	0
Crystal Palace	Total	45	1	1	0	1	0	0	0	47	1
Colchester United (loan)	2008–09	2	0	0	0	0	0	0	0	2	0
Colchester United (loan)	Total	2	0	0	0	0	0	0	0	2	0
Oldham Athletic (loan)	2009–10	3	0	1	0	0	0	0	0	4	0
Oldham Athletic (loan)	Total	3	0	1	0	0	0	0	0	4	0
Southend United (loan)	2011–12	7	0	0	0	0	0	1	0	8	0
Southend United (loan)	Total	7	0	0	0	0	0	1	0	8	0
Stevenage	2012–13	11	0	0	0	0	0	0	0	11	0
Stevenage	2013–14	2	0	0	0	1	0	0	0	3	0
Stevenage	Total	13	0	0	0	1	0	0	0	14	0
Career totals		70	1	2	0	2	0	1	0	75	1

A. The "League" column constitutes appearances and goals (including those as a substitute) in the Football League.
B. The "Other" column constitutes appearances and goals (including those as a substitute) in the play-offs.
