= Mike Thalassitis =

British footballer and television personality (1993–2019)

- Thalassitis in 2018
- Born: 19 January 1993; London, England
- Died: 15 March 2019 (aged 26); London, England
- Occupations: Footballer; television personality
- Years active: 2010–2019
- Height: 6 ft 2 in (1.88 m)
Association football career
- Position: Forward
Youth career
- 2010–2011: Stevenage
Senior career*
Years	Team	Apps	(Gls)
2011–2014	Stevenage	6	(0)
2011–2012	→ Boreham Wood (loan)	11	(5)
2012	→ Hayes & Yeading United (loan)	5	(3)
2012	→ Cambridge United (loan)	2	(0)
2012–2013	→ Bishop's Stortford (loan)	7	(0)
2013	→ Boreham Wood (loan)	19	(7)
2013–2014	→ Ebbsfleet United (loan)	37	(8)
2015	Bishop's Stortford	7	(1)
2015–2016	Chelmsford City	5	(1)
2015–2016	Concord Rangers	2	(0)
2016	St Albans City	15	(6)
2016	Margate	12	(2)
2016–2017	Hemel Hempstead Town	15	(0)
2017	Worthing	2	(1)
2017	Margate	6	(2)
Total		151	(36)
International career
2012	Cyprus U19	3	(0)
2013	Cyprus U21	4	(2)
- * Club domestic league appearances and goals

Michael Thalassitis (Greek: Μάικ Θαλασσίτης; 19 January 1993 – 15 March 2019) was an English-Cypriot footballer and television personality. He was known for his appearances on the third series of ITV2 reality series Love Island and the fourth series of E4 dating series Celebs Go Dating.

Thalassitis signed a professional two-year contract with Stevenage in May 2011, having joined the club's Centre of Excellence ahead of the 2010–11 season, just after Stevenage's promotion to the Football League. He made his first-team debut in August 2011. Two months later, he joined Conference South side Boreham Wood on loan, returning to his parent club in January 2012. He was loaned out once again a month later, signing for Hayes & Yeading United on a one-month loan deal. During the 2012–13 season, he was briefly loaned out to Cambridge United in September 2012, before joining Bishop's Stortford on loan two months later. He then spent the remainder of the season on loan at Boreham Wood, his second loan spell at the club. Ahead of the 2013–14 season, he joined Ebbsfleet United on a season-long loan.

In 2017, Thalassitis appeared on the ITV2 reality series Love Island and retired from football in December that year. In March 2019, he was found dead at the age of 26 at a park in London. His cause of death was suicide by hanging.

== Club career ==
=== Stevenage ===
Thalassitis joined Stevenage's youth system ahead of the 2010–11 season. He scored 17 goals in 26 games for the club's U18 side in his first season with the club. As a result of his fine form during the season, he was handed a two-year professional contract with the club on 18 May 2011. This meant that Thalassitis was the first player to sign a professional deal with the club from the Centre of Excellence that was "hastily formed" following the club's promotion to the Football League. Thalassitis made his competitive debut for Stevenage in the club's 1–0 away defeat to Milton Keynes Dons on 27 August 2011, coming on as a 63rd-minute substitute in the match. During the game, he produced a "strong run forcing goalkeeper David Martin to tip his effort from the edge of the box onto the bar", as well as missing a chance to restore parity in injury-time.

Thalassitis joined Conference South side Boreham Wood on a one-month loan deal in October 2011. He made his debut for the club a day after signing, scoring after 17 minutes in a 3–1 home victory against Dartford. During his initial one-month loan spell, Thalassitis made five league appearances for the club, in which Boreham Wood recorded five straight victories — propelling them from twentieth place to eighth in the Conference South standings. His loan spell was subsequently extended for a further month on 9 November 2011. Three days later, on 12 November, Thalassitis scored a hat-trick in Boreham Wood's sixth consecutive league victory, a 4–2 home win against Dover Athletic. After scoring five times in twelve games for Boreham Wood, Thalassitis returned to his parent club on 4 January 2012. He was loaned out for a second time during the season, joining Conference National side Hayes & Yeading United on a one-month loan deal on 17 February 2012. He made his debut for the club a day later, scoring a consolation goal in injury-time in a 4–1 defeat to promotion chasing Wrexham. Thalassitis scored the only goal of the game in his next match three days later, netting with a header from goalkeeper Steve Arnold's long clearance in a 1–0 away victory at Bath City. He scored once more during his time at Hayes & Yeading, scoring in a 3–1 away win at Forest Green Rovers, and played five games during his one-month loan spell. He was recalled by Stevenage on 22 March, and went on to make two further substitute appearances for the club during the latter stages of the season.

Thalassitis made his first appearance of the 2012–13 season in Stevenage's first game of the season, coming on as a second-half substitute in a 3–1 home win over AFC Wimbledon in the League Cup. He scored his first goal for Stevenage in the following round of the competition, scoring a consolation strike in injury-time as the club lost 4–1 to Premier League side Southampton on 28 August 2012. A month later, Stevenage announced that Thalassitis had signed a three-year contract extension, and would also be going out on a one-month loan deal to Conference National side Cambridge United. During the brief loan spell, Thalassitis made just two appearances, both of which were as a late substitute. He was loaned out once again in November 2012, the fourth loan spell of his career, joining Conference South side Bishop's Stortford on a one-month loan agreement. The loan was later extended until January 2013, with Thalassitis making eight appearances in all competitions during his two-month spell. Thalassitis was loaned out almost immediately following his return from Stortford, joining Boreham Wood on loan for the remainder of the 2012–13 campaign. He began his second spell at the club by scoring the first goal in a 3–0 victory over Hayes & Yeading on 28 January 2013. Thalassitis went on to score seven times in 19 appearances during his second loan spell with Boreham Wood, returning to Stevenage at the end of the season.

Ahead of the 2013–14 season, Thalassitis was loaned out to Conference South side Ebbsfleet United on a season-long loan deal.

On 17 May 2014, Thalassitis was released by Stevenage.

=== Non-league ===
On 30 October 2015, Thalassitis joined Chelmsford City after departing Bishop's Stortford. Thalassitis scored his first goal for the Clarets in a loss against Gosport Borough on 5 December 2015. Thalassitis left on 2 January 2016 to join Concord Rangers. Less than a month after joining Concord, on 29 January 2016, Thalassitis signed for St Albans City.

On 27 May 2016, Thalassitis joined Margate from St Albans City. On 26 October 2016, Thalassitis joined Hemel Hempstead Town from Margate. On 28 February 2017, Thalassitis joined Welling United from Hemel Hempstead Town.

== International career ==
In December 2011, Thalassitis was called up to a three-day training camp with the Cyprus U19 side, and was later called up to represent the U19 side in March 2012. He made two appearances for Cyprus as they drew twice with the Georgia U19 side.

In May 2012, Thalassitis was called up for Cyprus U19's two games against Estonia, with both games taking place within the space of three days. He played 75 minutes of the first match, a 1–0 defeat; and then played 60 minutes of the next match, which ended 0–0. After impressing during his time with Cyprus, he was named in their 21-man squad to travel to Denmark for the 2012 UEFA European U19 elite qualification group. He started all three games as Cyprus finished bottom of their group.

In May 2014, Thalassitis was called up to the Cyprus senior side for the first time, for their away friendly with Japan. However, he was unable to travel due to suffering a ruptured ACL during the final game of the season whilst on loan.

== Television career ==
On 29 May 2017, Thalassitis was announced as part of the cast for the third series of the reality dating show Love Island. While the series began on 5 June, he did not enter the villa until 10 days later. Margate manager Steven Watt said in an interview that he was "disappointed" that Thalassitis did not tell him he was going to be a part of the show. Thalassitis earned the nickname "Muggy Mike" from contestant Chris Hughes after he chose to pair up with Hughes' love interest Olivia Attwood in a weekly recoupling. Thalassitis and fellow contestant Jessica Shears, along with their respective partners Olivia Attwood and Dom Lever, emerged among the three couples with the lowest votes for Favourite Couple from the public, and were dumped from the island as a result.

In 2018, Thalassitis joined the fourth series of Celebs Go Dating.

== Death ==
It was confirmed on 16 March 2019 that Thalassitis' body had been found hanging the previous day in a park in Edmonton, London, and he was declared dead at the age of 26. On 5 June, the North London Coroner's Court concluded that suicide by hanging was his cause of death.

== Career statistics ==
Appearances and goals by club, season and competition
Club	Season	League (Note: Includes the Football League and Football Conference.)		FA Cup		League Cup		Other (Note: Includes FA Trophy and Football League Trophy.)		Total	
Club	Season	Apps	Goals	Apps	Goals	Apps	Goals	Apps	Goals	Apps	Goals
Stevenage	2011–12	3	0	0	0	0	0	0	0	3	0
Stevenage	2012–13	2	0	0	0	2	1	0	0	4	1
Stevenage	Total	5	0	0	0	2	1	0	0	7	1
Boreham Wood (loan)	2011–12	11	5	0	0	0	0	1	0	12	5
Hayes & Yeading (loan)	2011–12	5	3	0	0	0	0	0	0	5	3
Cambridge United (loan)	2012–13	2	0	0	0	0	0	0	0	2	0
Bishop's Stortford (loan)	2012–13	7	0	0	0	0	0	1	0	8	0
Boreham Wood (loan)	2012–13	19	7	0	0	0	0	0	0	19	7
Ebbsfleet United (loan)	2013–14	6	2	0	0	0	0	0	0	6	2
Career total		55	17	0	0	2	1	2	0	59	18
