= Steve Arnold (footballer, born 1989) =

English footballer

- Arnold playing for Stevenage

Personal information
- Full name: Steven John William Arnold
- Date of birth: 22 August 1989 (age 37)
- Place of birth: Welham Green, England
- Height: 6 ft 1 in (1.86 m)
- Position: Goalkeeper

Youth career
- 2004–2005: Boreham Wood
- 2005: Arsenal
- 2005–2007: Norwich City

Senior career*
Years	Team	Apps	(Gls)
2007–2008	Norwich City	0	(0)
2008–2009	Grays Athletic	18	(0)
2009–2010	Eastleigh	3	(0)
2010–2012	Wycombe Wanderers	0	(0)
2011–2012	→ Hayes & Yeading United (loan)	31	(0)
2012–2014	Stevenage	31	(0)
2014–2016	Forest Green Rovers	43	(0)
2016–2017	Dover Athletic	30	(0)
2017–2018	Gillingham	0	(0)
2018	Barrow	17	(0)
2018–2019	Shrewsbury Town	23	(0)
2019–2021	Northampton Town	15	(0)
2021–2023	Southend United	52	(0)
2023–2025	Sutton United	29	(0)
2025–2026	Hemel Hempstead Town	0	(0)

International career
2009	England C	1	(0)
- * Club domestic league appearances and goals as of 09:29, 4 August 2026 (UTC)

Steven John William Arnold (born 22 August 1989) is an English professional footballer who plays as a goalkeeper.

Arnold began his career at Norwich City, signing professional terms in 2007 before his release the following year. He subsequently played for Grays Athletic and Eastleigh, before joining League One club Wycombe Wanderers in January 2010, spending two years there and being named Hayes & Yeading United's Player of the Year during a loan spell in the 2011–12 season. After leaving Wycombe in May 2012, he signed for League One club Stevenage, before joining Forest Green Rovers in June 2014. After two years at Forest Green, he spent the 2016–17 season with National League club Dover Athletic.

Arnold returned to the Football League with Gillingham in August 2017, though predominantly as back-up, before moving to Barrow in January 2018. He spent the 2018–19 season at Shrewsbury Town, and in June 2019, joined League Two club Northampton Town, helping the club earn promotion via the 2020 League Two play-offs. He then joined National League club Southend United, where he was named the club's Player of the Year for the 2021–22 season, before moving to Sutton United in June 2023. After two seasons, he signed for Hemel Hempstead Town in May 2025. Arnold also earned one cap for the England C team in February 2009.

== Early life ==
Born in Welham Green, Hertfordshire, Arnold played as a goalkeeper from a young age and aspired to emulate David Seaman and Peter Schmeichel. He is a lifelong supporter of Tottenham Hotspur.

== Club career ==
=== Early career ===
Arnold began his career in the Boreham Wood academy, before spending six months with Arsenal's under-15 team in 2005. He joined Norwich City's youth system later that year, signing as an academy scholar after a trial match against Rushden & Diamonds. A regular for the under-18 team, Arnold also trained with the first team and was an unused substitute in a League Cup match against Rotherham United on 19 September 2006. He signed a one-year professional contract on 11 May 2007, with the option of a further year, but made no first-team appearances. He was released on 6 May 2008, in part due to the emergence of goalkeepers Declan Rudd and Jed Steer.

=== Grays Athletic and Eastleigh ===
A month after his release from Norwich, Arnold signed a one-year contract with Conference Premier club Grays Athletic on 12 June 2008. He made his debut on the opening day of the 2008–09 season in a 3–1 defeat away to Weymouth. After starting the first three matches, he did not feature again until December 2008, when he kept the first clean sheet of his career in a 1–0 victory at Ebbsfleet United on 26 December 2008. He made 18 appearances as Grays avoided relegation, and left the club upon the expiry of his contract in June 2009.

Without a club at the start of the 2009–10 season, Arnold spent a week on trial with Brentford in October 2009, playing 45 minutes in a reserve match against Queens Park Rangers. No move followed, and he joined Conference South club Eastleigh on non-contract terms on 10 November 2009. With both of the club's goalkeepers injured, Arnold made his debut the same day in a 2–1 away victory at Dorchester Town, and went on to make five appearances.

=== Wycombe Wanderers and loan spell ===
Arnold joined League One club Wycombe Wanderers on a six-month contract on 22 January 2010, following a two-week trial. He served as second-choice goalkeeper for the remainder of the 2009–10 season and signed a one-year contract extension on 21 May 2010. Having not made a first-team appearance, he signed a further one-year extension on 11 May 2011.

Arnold joined Conference Premier club Hayes & Yeading United on a one-month loan on 5 August 2011. He debuted in a 3–1 home victory over Alfreton Town on 13 August 2011, saving two first-half penalties. Arnold played in all six matches during the initial loan, saving a further two penalties, and his spell was described as "hugely successful". The loan was extended until the end of the 2011–12 season, and he was ever-present during the first three months. He suffered a fractured metatarsal in a 3–3 draw against Stockport County on 5 November 2011 and returned to Wycombe for surgery. He resumed his loan two months later, assisting Michael Thalassitis' goal with a long clearance in a 1–0 victory at Bath City on 21 February 2012. Arnold made 31 appearances that season and was voted Supporters' Player of the Year. He was released by Wycombe at the expiry of his contract on 9 May 2012.

=== Stevenage ===
Following his departure from Wycombe, Arnold joined League One club Stevenage on a free transfer on 25 May 2012. Manager Gary Smith stated that goalkeeping coach Gary Phillips, who had previously worked with Arnold at Grays Athletic, had recommended signing him. He made his debut in a 3–2 Football League Trophy defeat to Dagenham & Redbridge on 4 September 2012, and earned his first league start in a 2–1 away victory over Notts County at Meadow Lane on 2 October. Arnold signed a two-year contract extension, keeping him at the club until summer 2015, and made 32 appearances in all competitions during his first season. Serving as second-choice goalkeeper behind Chris Day during the 2013–14 season, he made two appearances that season, and was released on 17 May 2014.

=== Forest Green Rovers ===
Arnold signed for Conference Premier club Forest Green Rovers on 6 June 2014. Manager Adrian Pennock highlighted his professionalism and presence upon signing, and stated he would provide competition for first-choice Sam Russell. Injury sidelined him for the first half of the 2014–15 season, eventually making his debut on 21 February 2015, keeping a clean sheet in a 3–0 win over AFC Telford United. He replaced Russell for the remainder of that season, making 14 appearances as Forest Green were defeated in the play-off semi-finals by Bristol Rovers.

Expected to start the 2015–16 season as first-choice, Arnold suffered an ankle injury in a pre-season friendly against Aston Villa. He was sidelined for three months and underwent surgery to address a recurring problem. He returned in November 2015 and played every match thereafter, making 31 appearances in all competitions as Forest Green reached the 2016 National League play-off final at Wembley Stadium, where they lost 3–1 to Grimsby Town on 15 May 2016. Although contract negotiations were reported as ongoing, he was released by the club on 3 June 2016.

=== Dover Athletic and Gillingham ===
After appearing in a pre-season friendly victory over Leyton Orient, Arnold joined National League club Dover Athletic on 16 July 2016. He made his debut on the opening day of the 2016–17 season, keeping a clean sheet in a 0–0 draw away to Wrexham. He kept nine clean sheets in 32 appearances as Dover finished sixth in the National League, and was released at the end of his contract in June 2017.

Following his departure from Dover, Arnold signed for League One club Gillingham on a one-year contract on 17 August 2017. The move reunited him with manager Adrian Pennock, who had signed him previously at Forest Green. He made two first-team appearances during the first half of the 2017–18 season, both in EFL Trophy victories, before his contract was cancelled by mutual consent on 16 January 2018.

=== Barrow and Shrewsbury Town ===
A day after leaving Gillingham, Arnold joined National League club Barrow on an 18-month contract. The move marked his third spell under Pennock, who had been appointed Barrow manager three months earlier. He debuted in a 3–1 defeat to Torquay United on 3 February 2018 and made 17 appearances during the second half of the season as Barrow avoided relegation by a single point. He left the club in the summer of 2018.

Following a one-week trial with League One club Shrewsbury Town, during which he impressed manager John Askey in two pre-season friendlies, Arnold signed a two-year contract on 19 July 2018. He made his debut in a 1–1 EFL Trophy draw with Manchester City under-21s on 28 August 2018. Initially second-choice goalkeeper behind Joel Coleman, he made his first league start in a 2–1 away victory against AFC Wimbledon on 3 November 2018. He established himself as first-choice goalkeeper thereafter, making 32 appearances before a hamstring injury in a 2–0 defeat to Portsmouth on 23 March 2019 curtailed his season.

=== Northampton Town ===
Arnold signed for League Two club Northampton Town on a two-year contract for an undisclosed fee on 5 June 2019. He was selected ahead of David Cornell for the opening match of the 2019–20 season against Port Vale but was substituted after 65 minutes with an injury sustained while saving from Tom Pope. Scans revealed a tendon tear, ruling him out for three months. Upon returning from injury in November 2019, he had lost his starting place to Cornell. Arnold regained the position in February 2020, making two appearances before the regular season was curtailed due to the COVID-19 pandemic. League standings were decided on a points-per-game basis, with Northampton qualifying for the play-offs. He played in all three play-off matches as the club secured promotion to League One, defeating Exeter City 4–0 in the behind-closed-doors final at Wembley Stadium on 29 June 2020.

He began the 2020–21 season as first-choice, but was dropped by manager Keith Curle following a 2–1 away defeat to Plymouth Argyle on 20 October 2020. Arnold regained his place in December, but injury prevented him from playing during the second half of the season, limiting him to 12 appearances that season. He was released upon the expiry of his contract in May 2021.

=== Southend United ===
Arnold signed for National League club Southend United on 2 July 2021. After a three-week pre-season absence due to contracting COVID-19, he made his debut in a 1–0 away victory against King's Lynn Town on 21 August 2021. Arnold was Southend's first-choice goalkeeper for the 2021–22 season, making 43 appearances in all competitions and earning the club's Player of the Year award in May 2022.

He started the first four matches of the 2022–23 season, but was withdrawn from the starting line-up during the warm-up ahead of a match against Oldham Athletic in August 2022 due to injury. Initially thought to be a back problem, scans revealed a hip cyst, requiring a minor operation. He returned to the starting line-up in March 2023, making 11 appearances that season. Although Arnold expressed a desire to remain at Southend, the club was under a transfer embargo and could not offer contract extensions, and he departed upon the expiry of his contract in June 2023.

=== Sutton United ===
Arnold signed a two-year contract at League Two club Sutton United. The move meant he was playing under manager Matt Gray, who had previously been assistant manager at Eastleigh during Arnold's time there. He made his debut in a 2–2 EFL Cup draw with Cambridge United on 8 August 2023, although was substituted at half-time due to a hip injury. He became Sutton's first-choice goalkeeper under new manager Steve Morison during the second half of the 2023–24 season, making 18 appearances as the club were relegated to the National League on the final day of the season. He signed a one-year contract extension on 21 May 2024.

Having made 14 appearances during the opening two months of the 2024–25 season, Arnold sustained an injury that ruled him out for the remainder of the campaign, and he left the club following the expiry of his contract in May 2025.

=== Hemel Hempstead Town ===
Arnold joined National League South club Hemel Hempstead Town on 19 May 2025. He made his only appearance in a 5–0 Herts Charity Cup victory against Enfield on 24 July 2025. He left the club in May 2026.

== International career ==
Arnold was called up to the England C team, who represent England at non-League level, for a friendly against Malta under-21s in February 2009. He appeared as a second-half substitute in a 4–0 victory on 17 February 2009.

== Career statistics ==
As of end of 2025–26 season

Appearances and goals by club, season and competition
Club	Season	League			FA Cup		League Cup		Other		Total	
Club	Season	Division	Apps	Goals	Apps	Goals	Apps	Goals	Apps	Goals	Apps	Goals
Norwich City	2007–08	Championship	0	0	0	0	0	0	—		0	0
Grays Athletic	2008–09	Conference Premier	18	0	0	0	—		0	0	18	0
Eastleigh	2009–10	Conference South	3	0	—		—		2 (Note: Appearance(s) in FA Trophy)	0	5	0
Wycombe Wanderers	2009–10	League One	0	0	0	0	0	0	0	0	0	0
Wycombe Wanderers	2010–11	League Two	0	0	0	0	0	0	0	0	0	0
Wycombe Wanderers	2011–12	League One	0	0	0	0	0	0	0	0	0	0
Wycombe Wanderers	Total		0	0	0	0	0	0	0	0	0	0
Hayes & Yeading United (loan)	2011–12	Conference Premier	31	0	0	0	—		0	0	31	0
Stevenage	2012–13	League One	30	0	1	0	0	0	1 (Note: Appearance(s) in Football League Trophy)	0	32	0
Stevenage	2013–14	League One	1	0	0	0	1	0	0	0	2	0
Stevenage	Total		31	0	1	0	1	0	1	0	34	0
Forest Green Rovers	2014–15	Conference Premier	12	0	0	0	—		2 (Note: Appearances in 2015 Conference Premier play-offs)	0	14	0
Forest Green Rovers	2015–16	National League	26	0	2	0	—		3 (Note: Appearances in 2016 National League play-offs)	0	31	0
Forest Green Rovers	Total		38	0	2	0	0	0	5	0	45	0
Dover Athletic	2016–17	National League	30	0	0	0	—		2	0	32	0
Gillingham	2017–18	League One	0	0	0	0	0	0	2	0	2	0
Barrow	2017–18	National League	17	0	0	0	—		0	0	17	0
Shrewsbury Town	2018–19	League One	23	0	7	0	0	0	2	0	32	0
Northampton Town	2019–20	League Two	4	0	2	0	0	0	4 (Note: One appearance in Football League Trophy; three appearances in 2020 League Two play-offs)	0	10	0
Northampton Town	2020–21	League One	11	0	0	0	1	0	0	0	12	0
Northampton Town	Total		15	0	2	0	1	0	4	0	22	0
Southend United	2021–22	National League	41	0	1	0	—		1	0	43	0
Southend United	2022–23	National League	11	0	0	0	—		0	0	11	0
Southend United	Total		52	0	1	0	0	0	1	0	54	0
Sutton United	2023–24	League Two	15	0	0	0	1	0	2	0	18	0
Sutton United	2024–25	National League	14	0	0	0	—		1 (Note: Appearance in National League Cup)	0	15	0
Sutton United	Total		29	0	0	0	1	0	3	0	33	0
Hemel Hempstead Town	2025–26	National League South	0	0	0	0	—		1 (Note: Appearance in Herts Charity Cup)	0	1	0
Career totals			287	0	13	0	3	0	23	0	326	0

== Honours ==
Northampton Town

- EFL League Two play-offs: 2020

Individual

- Hayes & Yeading United Player of the Year: 2011–12
- Southend United Player of the Year: 2021–22
