= 2012–13 Stevenage F.C. season =

Stevenage
2012–13 season
- Chairman: Phil Wallace
- Manager: Gary Smith (until 20 March); Mark Roberts (caretaker, until 30 Mar); Graham Westley (from 30 March)
- League One: 18th
- FA Cup: First round
- League Cup: Second round
- FL Trophy: First round
- Top goalscorer: League: Lucas Akins (10); All: Lucas Akins (10)
- Highest home attendance: 4,518 (v Swindon Town, League One, 27 October 2012)
- Lowest home attendance: 2,018 (v AFC Wimbledon, League Cup, 14 August 2012)

The 2012–13 season was Stevenage F.C.'s third season in the Football League, where the club competed in League One. This article shows statistics of the club's players in the season, and also lists all matches that the club played during the season. Their sixth-place finish and subsequent play-off semi-final defeat during the 2011–12 campaign means it was Stevenage's second season of playing in League One, having only spent two years as a Football League club. It was manager Gary Smith's first start to a season as Stevenage manager, having been appointed in January 2012. However, Smith was sacked in March 2013 following a run of 14 defeats in 18 games. His successor was Graham Westley, returning for his third spell in-charge of Stevenage, having previously managed the club for three years from 2003 to 2006, and then four years during his second-spell from 2008 to 2012.

Ahead of the season, there were wholesale changes involving the playing squad. Eight players were released in May 2012, including Ronnie Henry, subsequently ending his seven-year association with the club. With a number of players out of contract, further departures were revealed as Chris Beardsley, Joel Byrom, Scott Laird and John Mousinho all rejected the offer of contract extensions at Stevenage, and all four ended up signing for Preston North End, who at the time were managed by Westley. Three more first-team players left Stevenage before the start of the new campaign, both Michael Bostwick and Lawrie Wilson made the step up to the Championship, signing for Peterborough United and Charlton Athletic for respective undisclosed fees; while Craig Reid signed for League Two side Aldershot Town for a five-figure fee. Smith's first three signings of the close season were announced at the end of May, with goalkeeper Steve Arnold joining from Wycombe Wanderers, as well as midfielders James Dunne and Greg Tansey signing from Exeter City and Inverness Caledonian Thistle respectively. Five more players joined the club before the start of pre-season, and Lee Hills and Matt Ball were further additions following successful trials. In terms of transfer activity during the season, both Don Cowan and Rob Sinclair left the club on free transfers. Strikers Patrick Agyemang and Dani López were signed before the close of the summer transfer window, while defenders Andy Iro and Ben Chorley were acquired mid-season.

Despite the squad overhaul, Stevenage began the season positively, going on an eleven-match unbeaten run, six of which victories, to open the new campaign. Following the club's 2–1 home victory over Portsmouth in late October 2012, Stevenage found themselves in second place, just a point behind the league leaders at the time. However, Stevenage were defeated heavily in three of their next four matches, conceding four goals in each of the three defeats. Sitting in fifth position at the start of December, Stevenage would go on to win just five league matches out of the remaining 25, although did secure notable victories over promotion-chasing Brentford and Sheffield United. A run of 14 defeats in 18 matches ultimately resulted in Smith's sacking on 20 March 2013, ". Captain Mark Roberts briefly took caretaker charge, before it was announced that Westley would be returning for a third spell in-charge of the club, joining on 30 March. The club ended the season in 18th position in League One, with 54 points.

Stevenage also competed in three cup competitions during the season. The club opened the season by beating AFC Wimbledon in the League Cup, and as a result won a League Cup fixture for the first time in their history. They lost to Premier League side Southampton at Broadhall Way in the Second Round. The club fell at the first hurdle in both the Football League Trophy and FA Cup, losing 3–2 away to League Two opposition in both competitions; firstly to Dagenham & Redbridge in the Football League Trophy, before losing to Rotherham United in the FA Cup.

Winger Lucas Akins, who had joined the club in August 2012 for an undisclosed fee, was the club's top goalscorer for the season with ten goals, all of which came in the league. Akins also played in all 46 of Stevenage's league matches during the campaign, the only Stevenage player to remain ever-present during the league season. Another pre-season signing, James Dunne, won the Player of the Year award, as well as being voted Players' Player of the Year, for the season.

== Squad details ==
Last updated on 27 April 2013. The squad at the end of the season.

=== Players information ===
No.	Name	Nationality	Position	Date of birth (age)	Signed from	Notes
Goalkeepers
1	Steve Arnold	(England)	GK	22 August 1989 (age 37)	Wycombe Wanderers	
16	Chris Day	(England)	GK	28 July 1975 (age 51)	Millwall	
Defenders
2	David Gray	(Scotland)	RB	4 May 1988 (age 38)	Preston North End	
3	Lee Hills	(England)	LB	3 April 1990 (age 36)	Crystal Palace	
4	Darius Charles	(England)	LB	10 December 1987 (age 38)	Ebbsfleet United	
5	Jon Ashton	(England)	CB	4 October 1982 (age 43)	Grays Athletic	
14	Mark Roberts (c)	(England)	CB	16 October 1983 (age 42)	Northwich Victoria	
21	Andy Iro	(England)	CB	26 November 1984 (age 41)	Toronto	
22	Miguel Comminges	(Guadeloupe)	RB	16 March 1982 (age 44)	Colorado Rapids	
29	Bondz N'Gala	(England)	CB	13 September 1989 (age 36)	Yeovil Town	
33	Ben Chorley	(England)	CB	30 September 1982 (age 43)	Leyton Orient	
35	Max Ehmer	(Germany)	LB	3 February 1992 (age 34)	Queens Park Rangers (loan)	
36	Alex Smith	(England)	CB	31 October 1991 (age 34)	Fulham (loan)	
Midfielders
6	Greg Tansey	(England)	CM	21 November 1988 (age 37)	Inverness Caledonian Thistle	
7	Anthony Grant	(England)	CM	4 June 1987 (age 39)	Southend United	
8	James Dunne	(England)	CM	18 September 1989 (age 36)	Exeter City	
10	Filipe Morais	(Portugal)	RM	21 November 1985 (age 40)	Oldham Athletic	
15	Luke Freeman	(England)	LM	22 March 1992 (age 34)	Arsenal	
18	Gavin Mahon	(England)	CM	2 January 1977 (age 49)	Notts County (loan)	
17	Matt Ball	(Northern Ireland)	LM	26 March 1993 (age 33)	Norwich City	
28	Joseph N'Guessan	(England)	RM	15 July 1995 (age 31)	N/A	
32	Robin Shroot	(Northern Ireland)	RM	26 March 1988 (age 38)	Birmingham City	
Forwards
9	Marcus Haber	(Canada)	FW	11 January 1989 (age 37)	St Johnstone	
11	Lucas Akins	(England)	FW	25 February 1989 (age 37)	Tranmere Rovers	
23	Dani López	(Spain)	FW	25 October 1985 (age 40)	CD Badajoz	
30	Sam Hoskins	(England)	FW	4 February 1993 (age 33)	Southampton (loan)	
34	Roarie Deacon	(England)	FW	12 October 1991 (age 34)	Sunderland	

=== Management ===
- Manager: Graham Westley
- Assistant manager: Dino Maamria
- Fitness coach: Neil Withington
- Physiotherapists: Paul Dando

== Match results ==
=== Legend ===
Win	Draw	Loss

=== Pre-season ===
In May 2012, Stevenage announced that their pre–season campaign would consist of eight friendlies to open the 2012–13 season. A home fixture against Championship side Peterborough United was later added to the list of friendlies. In early July, the club announced that Stevenage would be travelling to Dublin to play two further pre-season friendlies, against St James's Gate and UCD respectively. It was also revealed that due to the first-team's pre-season tour to Dublin, the club would instead be sending a Stevenage XI side, composed of trialists and youth players, to the arranged fixture against Hitchin Town on 24 July. Similarly, Stevenage sent a Stevenage XI side to play Colney Heath on 31 July, as opposed to the first-team as first announced. The last of Stevenage's pre-arranged friendlies, against Barnet, scheduled to be played on 10 August, was also cancelled due to the 2012 Summer Olympics. Instead, it was announced that Stevenage would play Queens Park Rangers in a "behind closed doors" friendly on the same day.

Stevenage's first pre-season fixture was an away trip to Conference South side Boreham Wood on 14 July, with the game ending in a 1–1 draw. Stevenage fielded two entirely different teams in each half, playing a mixture of first-team players and trialists. The home side took the lead on the half hour mark when Inih Effiong cut in from the left wing before firing into the bottom left hand corner of the goal. Shortly after the interval, summer signing Marcus Haber headed in a Filipe Morais corner to restore parity, with the game ultimately finishing at one goal apiece. The club's next pre-season fixture took place four days later, on 18 July, as Stevenage welcomed Premier League side Tottenham Hotspur to Broadhall Way. Tottenham won the match 2–0, courtesy of second-half goals from new signing Gylfi Sigurðsson and youngster Iago Falqué. Similarly to the match against Boreham Wood, Stevenage fielded two different teams in each half, with the second-half team featuring a number of trialists. The club then embarked on their pre-season tour of Dublin, arriving on 20 July and playing their first match a day later — beating St James's Gate 7–0, courtesy of four goals from midfielder Robin Shroot, a brace from Michael Thalassitis, and a free-kick from Greg Tansey. The second, and final, game of the tour took place three days later, on 24 July, with Stevenage beating UCD 4–3 at the UCD Bowl. Marcus Haber opened the scoring when he headed in Filipe Morais' cross. The hosts replied by scoring goals either side of the interval, before Stevenage equalised through Robin Shroot. UCD replied instantly when Daniel Ledwith's left wing free-kick evaded everyone, before Shroot scored his second of the game with fifteen minutes remaining with an individual effort. Greg Tansey scored what proved to be the winner with a curling free-kick five minutes from time to ensure Stevenage won both of their games in Dublin. The team returned to England a day after their victory over UCD, and, at the end of the week, hosted an Arsenal XI side. The game ended goalless in front of a crowd of 1,068, with Arsenal's Serge Gnarby having the best effort of the game, seeing his shot rebound off the crossbar. Stevenage then lost 4–2 away to Bishop's Stortford, fielding a mixture of first-team players, trialists and members of the youth team, with Filipe Morais and Robin Shroot scoring for the away side. Three days later, on 4 August, the team drew 1–1 with Championship side Peterborough United. Greg Tansey scored Stevenage's goal, before Lee Tomlin equalised late-on. A 2–1 win over St Albans City at Clarence Park followed, both of Stevenage's goals coming from Robin Shroot. The club's final friendly, a "behind closed doors" match against Queens Park Rangers in Harlington, ended 2–2, with Stevenage coming from two goals down to draw, courtesy of second-half goals from Luke Freeman and Robin Shroot — Shroot's tenth goal of pre-season.

Game	Date	Opponent	Venue	Result	Attendance	Goalscorers	Notes
1	14 July 2012	Boreham Wood	Away	1–1	310	Haber	
2	18 July 2012	Tottenham Hotspur	Home	0–2	5,109		
3	21 July 2012	St James's Gate	Away	7–0	—	Shroot (4), Thalassitis (2), Tansey	
4	24 July 2012	UCD	Away	4–3	150	Haber, Shroot (2), Tansey	
5	28 July 2012	Arsenal XI	Home	0–0	1,068		
6	1 August 2012	Bishop's Stortford	Away	2–4	277	Morais, Shroot	
7	4 August 2012	Peterborough United	Home	1–1	1,072	Tansey	
8	8 August 2012	St Albans City	Away	2–1	475	Shroot (2)	
9	10 August 2012	Queens Park Rangers	Neutral	2–2	—	Freeman, Shroot	

- Note: Stevenage goals come first.

=== League One ===
The 2012–13 League One fixtures were released on 18 June 2012, with Stevenage opening their league campaign at home to Carlisle United on 18 August 2012. The game ended 1–1, meaning Stevenage had drawn their opening league fixture for a fourth consecutive season. Carlisle took the lead with just twenty minutes remaining, substitute Danny Cadamarteri neatly setting Matty Robson free down the left wing, who drove the ball across goal and into the bottom corner of the net. The home side equalised two minutes before time, substitute Lucas Akins' shot was dropped by goalkeeper Adam Collin, and another substitute, Robin Shroot, was there to tap the ball in from close range. Three days later, on 21 August, Stevenage faced Leyton Orient at Brisbane Road, in the club's first away game of the campaign. The game ended 1–0 in Stevenage's favour, their first win of the league season, with Lucas Akins scoring his first goal for the club mid-way through the first half after the home side had failed to clear Luke Freeman's free-kick. The team then travelled to Oldham Athletic four days later, on 25 August, and secured a second straight 1–0 away win. The only goal of the game was scored in the first-half, from the penalty spot, by Lucas Akins after Marcus Haber had been fouled by Oldham goalkeeper Alex Cisak.

The club started September with a 1–1 draw against Shrewsbury Town at Broadhall Way. The away side took the lead after just five minutes; Chris Day spilled Marc Richards' free-kick, and Paul Parry was there to prod the ball into the goal on the rebound. Stevenage equalised twenty minutes later when Darius Charles ran from his own half before striking a curling shot from 25-yards that beat Chris Weale in the Shrewsbury goal. A 2–1 away victory against recently relegated Coventry City followed on 9 September, with the game being televised live on Sky Sports. Coventry took the lead after eleven minutes when loanee David McGoldrick turned on the edge of the area, before striking a curling effort into the top corner of the goal. Stevenage equalised ten minutes later when a counterattack culminated with a Luke Freeman shot being parried into the path of an onrushing Robin Shroot, who swept the ball home from just inside the area. The comeback was completed with twenty minutes remaining, substitute Marcus Haber heading in Darius Charles' flick on from a Freeman corner. Six days later, Stevenage faced newly promoted Crewe Alexandra at Broadhall Way. Crewe started brightly and opened the scoring after just six minutes. A Gregor Robertson free-kick was blocked, but found its way to Max Clayton on the left wing, who rifled the ball across goal where A-Jay Leitch-Smith was on hand to connect from close range. Leitch-Smith doubled Crewe's advantage almost instantly, running on to a neat Chuks Aneke pass before finishing calmly with a low driven shot. Luke Freeman halved Stevenage's deficit midway through the first-half when he unleashed a shot from 25-yards, following good work from Patrick Agyemang and Lucas Akins, which left Crewe goalkeeper Alan Martin rooted to the spot. Former Stevenage loanee, Aneke, was sent-off for Crewe in the second half for a two-footed tackle on Anthony Grant. The home side made their numerical advantage count when substitute Robin Shroot scored with a neat turn and finish with ten minutes remaining. A 3–1 home victory over Walsall followed on 18 September. Robin Shroot had given Stevenage a first-half lead with a tidy finish from outside the area, before Walsall's George Bowerman equalised on the hour mark. The home side restored their lead through Greg Tansey, who scored with a driven shot from 30-yards, his first goal for the club. Lucas Akins sealed the victory late-on, when he steered in Tansey's cross at the back post. A week later, on 22 September, Stevenage drew 1–1 at Doncaster Rovers. Loan signing Oliver Risser headed Stevenage into the lead, before Doncaster's Chris Brown levelled in the second-half. The month ended with a 2–2 against Bury at Broadhall Way. The visitors, under the new management of Kevin Blackwell, opened the scoring through Tom Hopper's looping header. After the interval, Stevenage scored twice within the space of two minutes to turn the game on its head. Marcus Haber headed in Luke Freeman's corner to restore parity, before Greg Tansey scored a curling long-range strike. Bury equalised through second-half substitute Mark Cullen, to ensure a share of the spoils.

Stevenage travelled to second placed Notts County to begin October, securing a 2–1 victory at Meadow Lane. The hosts missed a penalty at the start of the second-half, with Jeff Hughes' spot-kick hitting the post. They were awarded another penalty twenty minutes later; this time Jamal Campbell-Ryce stepped up and duly converted from twelve yards. Stevenage levelled with just seven minutes remaining, Lucas Akins scoring from the penalty spot after Alan Sheehan handled Marcus Haber's goal-bound effort, with Sheehan receiving a straight red card for the offence. Substitute Robin Shroot scored in injury-time to give Stevenage the win, latching onto Haber's lofted through-pass to finish calmly. Stevenage then secured a 1–0 home victory over Scunthorpe United four days later. The only goal of the game came courtesy of Greg Tansey's curling free-kick fifteen minutes from time, enough to earn the hosts their second successive win. The club's unbeaten start to the league season was ended a week later, as they fell to 1–0 defeat away to Colchester United. Stevenage had Anthony Grant sent-off early in the second half for two bookable offences, before Colchester's Sanchez Watt scored the deciding goal with a drilled finish two minutes later. Stevenage recovered from their first defeat of the season by inflicting the first home defeat of the season on MK Dons a week later, with a first-half Lucas Akins strike settling the game and ensuring a 1–0 away victory. Three days later, on 23 October, Stevenage beat Portsmouth at Broadhall Way, winning 2–1. Midfielder Filipe Morais scored his first goal for the club after fifteen minutes, heading in a Lucas Akins cross. The visitors equalised early on in the second-half when Jon Harley found space on the edge of the area and fired in a left-footed shot from 20 yards. Stevenage responded almost instantly when a Morais cross evaded everyone and found its way into the net. Just four days later, Stevenage's unbeaten home record was ended courtesy of a 4–0 loss to Swindon Town. Swindon were three goals to the good before the interval, thanks to goals from Raffaele De Vita, Matt Ritchie, and Miles Storey, with the away side also missing a penalty. Swindon substitute Adam Rooney added a fourth on the hour mark.

Following the heavy home loss to Swindon, Stevenage returned to league action on 6 November, travelling to Huish Park to face Yeovil Town — with Stevenage winning the match by a 3–1 scoreline. The visitors opened the scoring after just two minutes; Felipe Morais turning in Greg Tansey's cross at the back post. Yeovil responded instantly through Paddy Madden's scissor kick. Shortly after the interval, Lucas Akins was on hand to turn in substitute Marcus Haber's low cross, before James Dunne's deflected effort doubled Stevenage's advantage and put the game beyond doubt. Four days later, Stevenage suffered their second consecutive heavy home defeat, this time losing 4–1 to Preston North End. The away side scored early on through Stuart Beavon's powerful strike, before Stevenage's Greg Tansey briefly restored parity with a curling effort from the edge of the area. Preston regained the lead through Jack King following good work from Jeffrey Monakana ten minutes before half-time. Two second-half long-range strikes from Monakana and Nicky Wroe respectively gave Preston a comfortable win. Another defeat followed a week later, losing 4–1 away to Sheffield United. The home side took the lead on the twenty-minute mark, defender Neill Collins heading home unmarked from Ryan Flynn's centre. Stevenage equalised just before half-time, captain Mark Roberts scoring with a header from Filipe Morais' corner. The parity was short-lived, however, as Shaun Miller netted twice after the interval, before Chris Porter added a fourth late-on to ensure a routine victory. Stevenage then travelled to Bournemouth three days later, securing a 1–1 draw. The visitors took the lead mid-way through the first-half when Marcus Haber found space down the right wing, before laying the ball onto Greg Tansey, who found the net from just outside the area. Bournemouth equalised with fifteen minutes remaining, substitute Matt Tubbs heading in Lewis Grabban's cross at the back post. Another 1–1 scoreline followed when Stevenage took on league leaders Tranmere Rovers at Broadhall Way on 24 November. The game came to life with just ten minutes left; Tranmere striker Jake Cassidy found space in the area, and headed in Adam McGurk's cross unmarked. Stevenage then hit the post late-on through Robin Shroot, before equalising deep into stoppage time when Greg Tansey picked up Mark Roberts' pass and curled a looping shot over Owain Fôn Williams in the Tranmere goal. The goal was Tansey's third in four games.

After a two-week break, Stevenage opened December with a 2–0 away victory against bottom-of-the-table Hartlepool United. Marcus Haber scored his third goal of the season when he reacted quickest after his initial header had rebounded off the post, giving Stevenage the lead after twenty minutes. The away side doubled their advantage on the hour mark. Hartlepool's Jordan Richards was adjudged to have handled the ball in the area, and Lucas Akins scored the resultant spot-kick. A 2–1 home loss to Crawley Town followed a week later, on 15 December. The match was the first home game for Stevenage since Mitchell Cole's passing, and the occasion was marked with numerous tributes to the former Stevenage player. The home side looked on course to take the three points when Robin Shroot neatly tucked the ball home from close range following David Gray's centre. However, Crawley netted twice within the space of four second-half minutes to secure their first league win in seven games. The club's game against Brentford, scheduled to be played at Griffin Park on 22 December, was postponed due to a waterlogged pitch. Stevenage returned to action on Boxing Day following an eleven-day break, losing 3–1 at home to in-form Coventry City. A first-half Lucas Akins penalty had given the hosts the lead, only for Coventry to score three times in the final ten minutes to secure all three points. Stevenage's last scheduled game of 2012, a home game against Notts County on 29 December, was postponed due to a waterlogged pitch. The club had held a 9am pitch inspection on the day of the game, and deemed the surface unplayable due to heavy rainfall during the days leading up to the match.

The new year began with a 1–0 defeat by Walsall at the Bescot Stadium on 1 January. A long-range Jamie Paterson strike with three minutes remaining was enough to settle the game. Four days later, Stevenage travelled to Crewe looking for their first win in a month. The game ended 2–1 to Stevenage, coming back from a first-half deficit to take all three points. Former Stevenage loanee, Chuks Aneke, had given Crewe the lead with a calm side-footed effort mid-way through the first period. Stevenage replied twice within the space of five second-half minutes; first Lucas Akins tapped in Anthony Grant's centre, before Akins' flick-on gave Marcus Haber room to run and slide the ball through Steve Phillips' legs in the Crewe goal. A week later, on 12 January, Stevenage's bad home form continued when they lost 2–1 to promotion chasing Doncaster Rovers. Doncaster, without a manager at the time of the game due to Dean Saunders leaving for Wolverhampton Wanderers, scored twice late-on to secure victory after Stevenage had led through James Dunne's powerful half-volley. The defeat meant that Stevenage were without a home win in six league matches. Stevenage's scheduled away game against Bury on 19 January was postponed as a result of heavy snowfall in the days leading up to the fixture. The Gigg Lane pitch failed an 11:30am inspection a day before the match was due to be played.

After a three-week period without first-team football, Stevenage returned to action with a home game against Leyton Orient on 2 February. The game ended 1–0 to the visitors, with an early Dean Cox goal separating the two teams. New signing Ben Chorley made his debut during the match, having signed from Orient just two days earlier. Three days later, on 5 February, Stevenage secured their first home win since October, beating Notts County 2–0 at Broadhall Way. Loanee Sam Hoskins gave Stevenage the lead inside the first minute, finishing calmly after Filipe Morais' shot had deflected into his path. Substitute Marcus Haber headed in a Morais cross in the final minute to give Stevenage a two-goal cushion. The team then made the long journey north to face Carlisle United on 9 February, losing the match 2–1. Carlisle were two goals to the good within the first fourteen minutes. Striker Rory Loy gave the hosts the lead, before Lee Miller doubled their advantage from the penalty spot, with goalkeeper Steve Arnold receiving a red card for a foul on Loy that resulted in the penalty. Marcus Haber scored his second goal in as many games to reduce the deficit, but Carlisle held on for the win. Stevenage then faced their second away game in three days, travelling to Griffin Park to face promoting-chasing Brentford. The hosts secured a comfortable 2–0 victory, thanks to long-range strikes from Tom Adeyemi and Marcello Trotta. A third straight defeat followed a week later, with Stevenage losing 2–1 at home to Oldham Athletic. The home side had taken a one-goal lead into the interval, courtesy of James Dunne's neat finish from the edge of the area. However, Oldham fought back with second-half goals from Dean Furman and James Tarkowski, taking all three points and inflicting Stevenage's eighth defeat in ten matches. Another defeat followed four days later, on 23 February, this time a 2–1 loss to Shrewsbury Town at New Meadow. Similarly to their previous match against Oldham, James Dunne gave Stevenage the lead in the first-half. Shrewsbury equalised on the half hour mark, before scoring late-on to secure all three points. Stevenage then lost 1–0 to Scunthorpe United three days later, with a second-half Mark Duffy strike settling the match. The result was Stevenage's tenth defeat in twelve matches, leaving them just eight points above the relegation places.

March began with a sixth straight defeat, with the club losing 2–0 at home to Colchester United. Two second-half Jabo Ibehre goals proved to be the difference. Just three days later, on 5 March, Stevenage ended their run of defeats by beating high-flying Brentford 1–0 at Broadhall Way. Having dominated the match for large spells, the home side took the lead with fifteen minutes left when Marcus Haber dinked the ball over Simon Moore in the Brentford goal. Stevenage then lost 2–0 away to Preston North End on 9 March, with goals from Lee Holmes and Will Hayhurst in the opening fifteen minutes settling the match. Another defeat followed three days later, with the club losing 1–0 at home to Bournemouth. A first-half Brett Pitman penalty was the only goal of the game, as Darius Charles was sent-off late-on for a second bookable offence. Stevenage's next match, played four days later, was a 4–0 home victory over second-placed Sheffield United. Returning from a loan spell at Barnet, striker Dani López made his first start for the club; opening the scoring just before half-time after turning Neill Collins inside the area and beating George Long in the Sheffield United goal. He then added a second shortly after the interval when he neatly converted a chipped through ball by Gavin Mahon. López scored his hat-trick just after the hour mark when Anthony Grant broke free and played a through ball to the Spanish forward, who then unleashed an unstoppable shot from just inside the area. Lucas Akins added Stevenage's fourth goal of the match with twenty minutes to go when he cut inside and beat Long with a low curling shot. Just three days after the club's impressive win over Sheffield United, Stevenage lost 2–0 to bottom-placed Bury at Gigg Lane. Goals from Craig Jones and Jonson Clarke-Harris, both of which coming within the final ten minutes of the match, proved to be the difference. Stevenage goalkeeper Steve Arnold also saved a first-half Steven Schumacher penalty. A day after the defeat by Bury, on 20 March, Stevenage announced that manager Gary Smith had been sacked following a run of 14 defeats in 18 games. Stevenage captain Mark Roberts was placed in caretaker charge while the club searched for a new manager, but could not prevent a 3–1 defeat by Tranmere Rovers at Prenton Park on 24 March, a game that was televised live on Sky Sports. Tranmere went ahead after ten minutes when Zoumana Bakayoko tapped in from close range, before Stevenage equalised almost instantly courtesy of a curling Luke Freeman free-kick. Just three minutes later, on the fifteen-minute mark, Tranmere had regained their lead; Stevenage failed to clear a Jean-Louis Akpa Akpro shot and the ball fell to defender Ben Gibson, whose shot went in following a deflection off David Gray. Bakayoko then doubled his goal tally and Tranmere's advantage shortly before the interval when he tucked away Paul Black's through pass. Five days later, Roberts took charge of the side for their trip to Broadfield Stadium to face Crawley Town. Full back Miguel Comminges was sent-off for two bookable offences after just half an hour. Despite being a man light, Stevenage took the lead just before the interval when David Gray headed on Luke Freeman's free-kick, and Roberts was on hand to head the ball into the goal from six yards. Crawley equalised ten minutes into the second-half after Matt Sparrow tucked the ball into the bottom corner of the goal. Both sides had chances to take all three points, but the game ended 1–1. A day after the draw to Crawley, on 30 March, Stevenage announced that Graham Westley had been re-appointed as the club's new manager, his third spell in-charge of the Hertfordshire side.

Westley's first game back as manager was a 1–0 home victory over Hartlepool United on 1 April. In what was a tight match, loan signing Max Ehmer scored the decisive goal with fifteen minutes remaining; latching onto Filipe Morais' blocked shot before scoring with a first-time finish, ensuring a winning start for Westley. A 0–0 draw against Portsmouth at Fratton Park followed five days later. A game of very few goalscoring opportunities, Stevenage striker Marcus Haber had the best chance of the match, hitting the crossbar with a header in injury-time. A week later, Stevenage fell to a 2–0 home defeat by promotion-chasing Yeovil Town, with second-half goals from Sam Foley and James Hayter securing the win for the visitors. Another defeat followed a week later as Stevenage came up against another team chasing promotion, losing 3–0 to Swindon Town at the County Ground. Swindon took the lead through Aden Flint's volley after twenty minutes, before the visitors had Dani Lopez sent-off for a clash with Swindon midfielder Alan McCormack. Swindon winger Gary Roberts added a second shortly after the interval, before Flint scored his second of the game to round off a comfortable win. The season ended with a 2–0 home defeat by MK Dons on 27 April. The away side took the lead ten minutes before half-time when Patrick Bamford headed in Shaun Williams' cross. Substitute Ryan Lowe doubled the advantage late-on in the second-half. Stevenage finished their second League One season in 18th place, picking up 54 points throughout the campaign.

Game	Date	Opponent	Venue	Result	Attendance	Goalscorers	Notes
1	18 August 2012	Carlisle United	Home	1–1	2,736	Shroot	
2	21 August 2012	Leyton Orient	Away	1–0	3,564	Akins	
3	25 August 2012	Oldham Athletic	Away	1–0	3,142	Akins (pen)	
4	1 September 2012	Shrewsbury Town	Home	1–1	2,374	Charles	
5	9 September 2012	Coventry City	Away	2–1	9,458	Shroot, Haber	
6	15 September 2012	Crewe Alexandra	Home	2–2	2,826	Freeman, Shroot	
7	18 September 2012	Walsall	Home	3–1	2,634	Shroot, Tansey, Akins	
8	22 September 2012	Doncaster Rovers	Away	1–1	5,910	Risser	
9	29 September 2012	Bury	Home	2–2	2,660	Haber, Tansey	
10	2 October 2012	Notts County	Away	2–1	4,927	Akins (pen), Shroot	
11	6 October 2012	Scunthorpe United	Home	1–0	2,953	Tansey	
12	13 October 2012	Colchester United	Away	0–1	4,045		
13	20 October 2012	MK Dons	Away	1–0	9,190	Akins	
14	23 October 2012	Portsmouth	Home	2–1	4,012	Morais (2)	
15	27 October 2012	Swindon Town	Home	0–4	4,518		
16	6 November 2012	Yeovil Town	Away	3–1	2,900	Morais, Akins, Dunne	
17	10 November 2012	Preston North End	Home	1–4	3,740	Tansey	
18	17 November 2012	Sheffield United	Away	1–4	17,984	Roberts	
19	20 November 2012	Bournemouth	Away	1–1	5,504	Tansey	
20	24 November 2012	Tranmere Rovers	Home	1–1	3,069	Tansey	
21	8 December 2012	Hartlepool United	Away	2–0	3,265	Haber, Akins (pen)	
22	15 December 2012	Crawley Town	Home	1–2	3,066	Shroot	
23	26 December 2012	Coventry City	Home	1–3	4,102	Akins (pen)	
24	1 January 2013	Walsall	Away	0–1	3,301		
25	5 January 2013	Crewe Alexandra	Away	2–1	4,262	Akins, Haber	
26	12 January 2013	Doncaster Rovers	Home	1–2	3,280	Dunne	
27	2 February 2013	Leyton Orient	Home	0–1	3,577		
28	5 February 2013	Notts County	Home	2–0	2,550	Hoskins, Haber	
29	9 February 2013	Carlisle United	Away	1–2	3,944	Haber	
30	12 February 2013	Brentford	Away	0–2	7,022		
31	19 February 2013	Oldham Athletic	Home	1–2	2,748	Dunne	
32	23 February 2013	Shrewsbury Town	Away	1–2	4,818	Dunne	
33	26 February 2013	Scunthorpe United	Away	0–1	2,382		
34	2 March 2013	Colchester United	Home	0–2	3,144		
35	5 March 2013	Brentford	Home	1–0	2,794	Haber	
36	9 March 2013	Preston North End	Away	0–2	9,000		
37	12 March 2013	Bournemouth	Home	0–1	2,418		
38	16 March 2013	Sheffield United	Home	4–0	3,483	López (3), Akins	
39	19 March 2013	Bury	Away	0–2	1,396		
40	24 March 2013	Tranmere Rovers	Away	1–3	4,342	Freeman	
41	29 March 2013	Crawley Town	Away	1–1	3,395	Roberts	
42	1 April 2013	Hartlepool United	Home	1–0	2,903	Ehmer	
43	6 April 2013	Portsmouth	Away	0–0	12,036		
44	13 April 2013	Yeovil Town	Home	0–2	3,516		
45	20 April 2013	Swindon Town	Away	0–3	9,515		
46	27 April 2013	MK Dons	Home	0–2	3,801		

- Note: Stevenage goals come first.

=== League Cup ===
First Round fixtures for the competition were released on 14 June 2012, with Stevenage being drawn at home to League Two opposition in the form of AFC Wimbledon. Unlike in previous seasons, the first round fixture turned out to be the opening game of the domestic season, as opposed to teams traditionally starting a campaign with a league match. The game ended 3–1 in Stevenage's favour, with all four goals coming in the first-half. The hosts opened the scoring after fifteen minutes when Luke Freeman drove a left-wing ball across goal, which was ultimately turned into his own net by AFC Wimbledon defender Pim Balkestein. Stevenage doubled their advantage seven minutes before the interval. AFC Wimbledon goalkeeper Seb Brown mis-timed a heavy defensive back pass, with the ball falling to debutant James Dunne, who slotted the ball into an empty net. The visitors responded immediately, Brendan Kiernan reducing the deficit when he successfully connected with a Luke Moore cross. Just four minutes later, in first-half injury time, Stevenage restored their two-goal cushion. A Greg Tansey free-kick was met on the half-volley by Marcus Haber; with Haber's volley goalbound, captain Mark Roberts slid in at the back post to ensure the ball crossed the line. Despite a number of goalscoring opportunities for the hosts in the second period, the scoreline remained the same and Stevenage progressed to the second round of the competition for the first time in their history.

A day after the win over Wimbledon, on 15 August, the second round draw was made, with Stevenage being dealt another home tie, this time against Premier League opposition in the form of newly promoted Southampton. The match was played on 28 August, with Southampton running out 4–1 winners. The visitors took the lead early on in the second-half through Tadanari Lee, who swept home Billy Sharp's low cross. The away side doubled their advantage in controversial fashion when Sharp scored from a quick free-kick inside the area after referee Oliver Langford had wrongly adjudged defender Mark Roberts to have deliberately passed the ball back to goalkeeper Chris Day, who in-turn picked up the ball. Almost immediately after, Southampton scored once again, Jason Puncheon scoring with a volley from 35 yards. Substitute Michael Thalassitis scored his first goal for the club in injury-time to reduce the deficit, netting from an acute angle after good work down the right from David Gray. Southampton scored a fourth almost instantly when substitute Ben Reeves curled in a shot from the edge of the area.

Game	Date	Opponent	Venue	Result	Attendance	Goalscorers	Notes
1	14 August 2012	AFC Wimbledon	Home	3–1	2,018	Balkestein (o.g), Dunne, Roberts	
2	28 August 2012	Southampton	Home	1–4	3,062	Thalassitis	

- Note: Stevenage goals come first.

=== FA Cup ===
The club entered the 2012–13 FA Cup at the First Round stage — only the third time the club had entered the competition at this stage since 1997. The First Round draw was made on 21 October 2012; Stevenage facing a trip to League Two side Rotherham United at the New York Stadium. The game was played on 3 November, with Rotherham running out 3–2 winners. The home side were three goals to the good before the hour mark, courtesy of a Mark Bradley strike and a brace from Lee Frecklington. Stevenage rallied late-on, scoring through a long-range strike from James Dunne and a first-time finish from Filipe Morais, but Rotherham ultimately held on to ensure Stevenage suffered an early exit from the competition.

Game	Date	Opponent	Venue	Result	Attendance	Goalscorers	Notes
1	3 November 2012	Rotherham United	Away	2–3	4,324	Dunne, Morais	

- Note: Stevenage goals come first.

=== Football League Trophy ===
The First Round draw was made on 18 August 2012, with Stevenage being dealt an away tie against League Two side Dagenham & Redbridge. The game was played on 4 September 2012, with Dagenham winning the match 3–2. The hosts took the lead after twelve minutes when Brian Woodall headed in Dominic Green's cross. Stevenage levelled through Mark Roberts, who scored from close range after the Dagenham defence had failed to clear a free-kick. The home side responded instantly with two goals in quick succession through Josh Scott and a Michael Spillane penalty. Second-half substitute Robin Shroot halved Stevenage's deficit with a driven effort fifteen minutes from time, although ultimately it was Dagenham who held on to progress to the Second Round.

Game	Date	Opponent	Venue	Result	Attendance	Goalscorers	Notes
1	4 September 2012	Dagenham & Redbridge	Away	2–3	981	Roberts, Shroot	

- Note: Stevenage goals come first.

== League table ==
Pos	Team	Pld	W	D	L	GF	GA	GD	Pts
16	Shrewsbury Town	46	13	16	17	54	60	−6	55
17	Carlisle United	46	14	13	19	56	77	−21	55
18	Stevenage	46	15	9	22	47	64	−17	54
19	Oldham Athletic	46	14	9	23	46	59	−13	51
20	Colchester United	46	14	9	23	47	68	−21	51

Updated to match(es) played on 27 April 2013. Source: BBC Sport
Rules for classification: 1) Points; 2) Goal difference; 3) Number of goals scored

== Season statistics ==
=== Starts and goals ===
No.	Pos	Nat	Player	Total		League One		FA Cup		League Cup		FL Trophy	
No.	Pos	Nat	Player	Apps	Goals	Apps	Goals	Apps	Goals	Apps	Goals	Apps	Goals
1	GK	(England) ENG	Steve Arnold	32	0	30	0	1	0	0	0	1	0
2	DF	(Scotland) SCO	David Gray	46	0	42	0	1	0	2	0	1	0
3	DF	(England) ENG	Lee Hills	11	0	9+2	0	0	0	0	0	0	0
4	DF	(England) ENG	Darius Charles	41	1	33+4	1	1	0	2	0	1	0
5	DF	(England) ENG	Jon Ashton	9	0	8	0	0	0	1	0	0	0
6	MF	(England) ENG	Greg Tansey	40	6	26+11	6	0	0	2	0	1	0
7	MF	(England) ENG	Anthony Grant	45	0	34+7	0	1	0	1+1	0	1	0
8	MF	(England) ENG	James Dunne	45	5	40+2	3	1	1	2	1	0	0
9	FW	(Canada) CAN	Marcus Haber	46	7	33+9	7	1	0	2	0	0+1	0
10	MF	(Portugal) POR	Filipe Morais	31	4	21+7	3	1	1	1	0	1	0
11	FW	(England) ENG	Lucas Akins	49	10	41+5	10	1	0	1+1	0	0	0
12	DF	(Cyprus) CYP	Anthony Furlonge	0	0	0	0	0	0	0	0	0	0
14	DF	(England) ENG	Mark Roberts	48	4	44	2	1	0	2	1	1	1
15	MF	(England) ENG	Luke Freeman	43	2	26+13	2	1	0	2	0	0+1	0
16	GK	(England) ENG	Chris Day	19	0	16+1	0	0	0	2	0	0	0
17	MF	(Northern Ireland) NIR	Matt Ball	2	0	1+1	0	0	0	0	0	0	0
18	MF	(England) ENG	Gavin Mahon	9	0	8+1	0	0	0	0	0	0	0
19	MF	(Cyprus) CYP	Michael Thalassitis	4	1	0+2	0	0	0	0+2	1	0	0
21	DF	(England) ENG	Andy Iro	0	0	0	0	0	0	0	0	0	0
22	DF	(Guadeloupe) GLP	Miguel Comminges	21	0	19+2	0	0	0	0	0	0	0
23	FW	(Spain) ESP	Dani López	11	3	7+3	3	0+1	0	0	0	0	0
24	FW	(Ghana) GHA	Patrick Agyemang	16	0	5+9	0	0+1	0	0	0	1	0
25	DF	(England) ENG	George Allen	0	0	0	0	0	0	0	0	0	0
26	DF	(England) ENG	Harold Joseph	0	0	0	0	0	0	0	0	0	0
27	GK	(England) ENG	Charlie Horlock	0	0	0	0	0	0	0	0	0	0
28	MF	(England) ENG	Joseph N'Guessan	1	0	0+1	0	0	0	0	0	0	0
29	DF	(England) ENG	Bondz N'Gala	28	0	21+4	0	1	0	1	0	1	0
30	FW	(England) ENG	Sam Hoskins	14	1	6+8	1	0	0	0	0	0	0
32	MF	(Northern Ireland) NIR	Robin Shroot	29	7	11+15	6	0	0	0+2	0	0+1	1
33	DF	(England) ENG	Ben Chorley	8	0	8	0	0	0	0	0	0	0
34	FW	(England) ENG	Roarie Deacon	1	0	0+1	0	0	0	0	0	0	0
35	DF	(Germany) GER	Max Ehmer	6	1	5+1	1	0	0	0	0	0	0
36	DF	(England) ENG	Alex Smith	0	0	0	0	0	0	0	0	0	0
Players who left the club before the end of the season
18	FW	(Republic of Ireland) IRL	Don Cowan	0	0	0	0	0	0	0	0	0	0
20	MF	(England) ENG	Anthony Jeffrey	1	0	0+1	0	0	0	0	0	0	0
20	MF	(United States) USA	Robbie Rogers	9	0	1+5	0	0+1	0	1	0	1	0
25	MF	(Namibia) NAM	Oliver Risser	13	1	5+7	1	0	0	0	0	1	0
26	MF	(England) ENG	Rob Sinclair	0	0	0	0	0	0	0	0	0	0
28	FW	(Cameroon) CMR	Steve Leo Beleck	13	0	6+7	0	0	0	0	0	0	0

- Note: '+' denotes appearance as a substitute.
- Note: Herts Senior Cup games and statistics not included.

=== End of Season Awards ===
Award	Player
Supporters Association Player of the Year	James Dunne
Players' Player of the Year	James Dunne

== Transfers ==
=== In ===
Pos	Player	From	Fee	Date	Notes
GK	Steve Arnold (ENG)	Wycombe Wanderers	Free Transfer	24 May 2012	
MF	James Dunne (ENG)	Exeter City	£75,000	24 May 2012	
MF	Greg Tansey (ENG)	Inverness Caledonian Thistle	Free Transfer	25 May 2012	
MF	Anthony Grant (ENG)	Southend United	Free Transfer	13 June 2012	
DF	David Gray (SCO)	Preston North End	Free Transfer	14 June 2012	
DF	Bondz N'Gala (ENG)	Yeovil Town	Undisclosed	4 July 2012	
FW	Marcus Haber (CAN)	St Johnstone	Free Transfer	5 July 2012	
MF	Filipe Morais (POR)	Oldham Athletic	Free Transfer	6 July 2012	
DF	Lee Hills (ENG)	Crystal Palace	Free Transfer	18 July 2012	
MF	Matt Ball (NIR)	Norwich City	Free Transfer	19 July 2012	
FW	Lucas Akins (ENG)	Tranmere Rovers	Undisclosed	2 August 2012	
FW	Patrick Agyemang (GHA)	Queens Park Rangers	Free Transfer	31 August 2012	
FW	Dani López (ESP)	CD Badajoz	Free Transfer	31 August 2012	
DF	Andy Iro (ENG)	Toronto	Free Transfer	24 September 2012	
DF	Ben Chorley (ENG)	Leyton Orient	Undisclosed	31 January 2013	
FW	Roarie Deacon (ENG)	Sunderland	Free Transfer	28 March 2013	

=== Out ===
Pos	Player	To	Fee	Date	Notes
GK	Alan Julian (ENG)	Newport County	Released	17 May 2012	
DF	Phil Edwards (ENG)	Rochdale	Released	17 May 2012	
MF	Darren Murphy (IRL)	Port Vale	Released	17 May 2012	
MF	Stacy Long (ENG)	AFC Wimbledon	Released	17 May 2012	
MF	Jennison Myrie-Williams (ENG)	Port Vale	Released	17 May 2012	
FW	Ben May (ENG)	Dover Athletic	Released	17 May 2012	
MF	Peter Winn (ENG)	Macclesfield Town	Released	17 May 2012	
DF	Ronnie Henry (ENG)	Luton Town	Released	17 May 2012	
MF	Joel Byrom (ENG)	Preston North End	Free Transfer	25 May 2012	
DF	Scott Laird (ENG)	Preston North End	Free Transfer	27 May 2012	
MF	John Mousinho (ENG)	Preston North End	Free Transfer	29 May 2012	
FW	Chris Beardsley (ENG)	Preston North End	Free Transfer	5 June 2012	
DF	Lawrie Wilson (ENG)	Charlton Athletic	Undisclosed	9 July 2012	
MF	Michael Bostwick (ENG)	Peterborough United	Undisclosed	9 July 2012	
FW	Craig Reid (ENG)	Aldershot Town	Undisclosed	23 July 2012	
FW	Don Cowan (IRL)	Dundee	Released	11 January 2013	
MF	Rob Sinclair (ENG)	Salisbury City	Free Transfer	31 January 2013	

=== Loans in ===
Pos	Player	From	Date	End date	Notes
MF	Robbie Rogers (USA)	Leeds United	23 August 2012	15 January 2013	
MF	Oliver Risser (NAM)	Swindon Town	31 August 2012	3 January 2013	
FW	Sam Hoskins (ENG)	Southampton	3 January 2013	1 May 2013	
FW	Steve Leo Beleck (CMR)	Watford	4 January 2013	1 May 2013	
MF	Gavin Mahon (ENG)	Notts County	22 February 2013	1 May 2013	
MF	Anthony Jeffrey (ENG)	Arsenal	1 March 2013	1 May 2013	
DF	Max Ehmer (GER)	Queens Park Rangers	28 March 2013	1 May 2013	
DF	Alex Smith (ENG)	Fulham	28 March 2013	1 May 2013	

=== Loans out ===
Pos	Player	To	Date	End date	Notes
DF	Anthony Furlonge (CYP)	Bishop's Stortford	31 August 2012	7 December 2012	
FW	Michael Thalassitis (CYP)	Cambridge United	18 September 2012	18 October 2012	
MF	Rob Sinclair (ENG)	Aldershot Town	6 November 2012	10 January 2013	
FW	Dani López (ESP)	Aldershot Town	9 November 2012	24 January 2013	
FW	Michael Thalassitis (CYP)	Bishop's Stortford	15 November 2012	15 January 2013	
FW	Don Cowan (IRL)	Braintree Town	22 November 2012	22 December 2012	
DF	Andy Iro (ENG)	Barnet	22 November 2012	14 February 2013	
FW	Michael Thalassitis (CYP)	Boreham Wood	20 January 2013	29 April 2013	
FW	Patrick Agyemang (GHA)	Portsmouth	8 February 2013	29 April 2013	
FW	Dani López (ESP)	Barnet	15 February 2013	13 March 2013	
DF	Bondz N'Gala (ENG)	Barnet	15 February 2013	13 March 2013	
MF	Matt Ball (ENG)	Farnborough	19 February 2013	19 March 2013	
DF	Anthony Furlonge (CYP)	Tonbridge Angels	9 March 2013	29 April 2013	

== See also ==
- 2012–13 in English football
- List of Stevenage F.C. seasons
