= Dani López (footballer, born 1985) =

Spanish footballer

Personal information
- Full name: Daniel López Robles
- Date of birth: 25 October 1985 (age 41)
- Place of birth: Las Rozas de Madrid, Spain
- Height: 1.87 m (6 ft 2 in)
- Position: Forward

Youth career
- Sporting Hortaleza
- El Pardo
- 2001–2003: Atlético Madrid

Senior career*
Years	Team	Apps	(Gls)
2003–2004	Navalcarnero	14	(0)
2004–2006	Atlético Madrid B	35	(5)
2006–2007	Atlético Madrid C	19	(10)
2007–2008	Getafe B	34	(22)
2008–2009	Laz Rozas	25	(19)
2009–2010	Espanyol B	20	(1)
2011–2012	Badajoz	23	(3)
2012–2014	Stevenage	13	(3)
2012–2013	→ Aldershot Town (loan)	12	(6)
2013	→ Barnet (loan)	5	(3)
2013–2014	→ Barnet (loan)	8	(1)
2014	→ Barnet (loan)	7	(1)
2015	La Roda	16	(4)
2015–2016	Inverness Caledonian Thistle	9	(1)
2016–2019	Arenas Getxo	110	(18)
2019–2021	Don Benito	43	(7)
2021–2022	Portugalete	36	(9)
2022	Leioa	0	(0)
2022	Sámano	6	(2)
- * Club domestic league appearances and goals

Daniel "Dani" López Robles (born 25 October 1985) is a Spanish former footballer who played as a forward.

López began his career as part of Atlético Madrid's academy, spending two years on youth terms with the club. He joined CDA Navalcarnero in 2003, and spent a season with the club. López then returned to Atlético Madrid, but to play for the club's 'B' and 'C' teams respectively over the period of three seasons. In 2007, he signed for Getafe B of the Tercera División. Following a successful season with Getafe, López joined Las Rozas in 2008, the team of the city where he was born. A year later, he joined Espanyol B of Segunda División B. In August 2011, López signed for CD Badajoz, spending the 2011–12 campaign with the club. López signed for English League One side Stevenage on a free transfer in August 2012. During the 2012–13 season, he spent two months on loan at League Two side Aldershot Town, as well as spending time on loan at Barnet.

== Career ==
López started his career as a youth player at Sporting Hortaleza, before joining AD El Pardo and then Atlético Madrid's academy at the age of 16. In the English media, it was widely reported that López played in the same youth team as Fernando Torres while at Atlético Madrid. However, López stated that although he spoke to Torres occasionally, and were of a similar age, they did not play in the same team as Torres was on the periphery of playing first-team football. After two years of academy football at Atlético, López joined local side CDA Navalcarnero on a free transfer in July 2003. He made 14 appearances for the club during the 2003–04 season, although failed to get on the scoresheet. He returned to Atlético Madrid in 2004, playing for the Atlético Madrid B team for two seasons, during which he scored five times in 35 appearances. The following season, López moved to the Atlético Madrid C team of the Tercera División, scoring ten goals in 19 appearances during the 2006–07 campaign.

His association with Atlético Madrid ended in the summer of 2007, subsequently signing for Getafe B, who were also playing in the Tercera División. During his one season at Getafe, López finished as the club's top goalscorer for the season, scoring 22 times in 34 appearances in a season that witnessed the club finish seventh. Ahead of the 2008–09 season, López signed for Getafe B's divisional rivals, Las Rozas, on a free transfer. He made 25 league appearances during his one season with the club, scoring 19 times. After impressing during his two years in the fourth tier of Spanish football, López attracted the interest of Segunda División B side Espanyol B, and eventually signed for the club shortly before the start of the 2009–10 campaign. However, López failed to cement a first-team place during the season, with the majority of his appearances coming from the substitute's bench. He scored once in 20 appearances as Espanyol B were relegated after finishing in the final relegation place.

In August 2011, López signed for CD Badajoz on a free transfer, meaning he would remain in the Segunda División B for the 2011–12 season. He made 23 league appearances during the campaign, scoring three goals, although missed three months of the season through injury, as Badajoz finished in mid-table. Despite this, the club were relegated at the end of the season having failed to pay €70,000 worth of wages to contracted players. As a result, López left the club when his contract expired in July 2012.

=== Stevenage ===
On the final day of the 2012–13 summer transfer window, English League One side Stevenage announced that they had signed López on a free transfer, following a successful trial period with the club. Stevenage manager Gary Smith stated, while on trial, López scored a hat-trick in a twenty-minute 8v8 match, and, although unfit, felt he showed enough over the two weeks to warrant a full-time contract. He made his debut two weeks later, on 15 September 2012, coming on as a 79th-minute substitute in the club's 2–2 home draw against Crewe Alexandra. In November 2012, having made just three substitute appearances for Stevenage, López was loaned out to League Two club Aldershot Town on a one-month loan deal. He made his debut in a 2–0 home defeat to Bradford City on 10 November, coming on as a 69th-minute substitute. The following week, in his first starting appearance for Aldershot, López scored in the club's 1–1 draw away to AFC Wimbledon. In Aldershot's next match three days later, on 20 November, López scored the only goal of the game in a 1–0 away victory at Burton Albion; picking up Danny Hylton's flick-on before lashing the ball into the net from 20 yards. López made it three goals in as many games four days later, when he scored a header from Kieron Cadogan's cross in a 3–1 home defeat to Port Vale. In December 2013, it was announced that López' loan deal was extended for a further month, running until 26 January 2013. He scored a further three goals during the remainder of his loan spell, taking his goal tally to six goals in twelve games.

He returned to Stevenage at the end of his loan agreement at Aldershot, and made one appearance as a second-half substitute in a home game against Leyton Orient on 2 February 2013. However, just two weeks later, López was again loaned out, this time joining League Two side Barnet on a one-month loan deal. He made his debut when he started Barnet's home game against Rochdale on 23 February, playing the whole match in a 0–0 draw. Three days later, he got the final touch on a shot from Edgar Davids against Southend United that resulted in a goal, although the goal was ultimately awarded to Davids. López scored a second-half hat-trick in Barnet's 4–1 home victory over Morecambe on 9 March 2013. He scored three times in five games during the brief loan spell, before being recalled by his parent club on 13 March, due to Stevenage suffering from a host of injuries and suspensions. Just three days after being recalled, on 16 March, he scored a hat-trick, his second within the space of a week, as Stevenage secured a 4–0 home victory over Sheffield United. The game was also Lopez's first start for the club. He made ten appearances for Stevenage during the season, scoring three goals, although his season ended prematurely after receiving a red card following an altercation with Alan McCormack of Swindon Town on 20 April 2013. In the 2013–14 season, he made four appearances for Stevenage between August and October, three as substitute, before joining Barnet on loan again on 10 October. His first and second goals on his return to the Bees came in a 3–0 FA Cup qualifying win over Concord Rangers on 26 October. He joined the Bees on loan again on 23 January until the end of the 2013–14 season. The loan spell was cut short on 16 April due to injury. Across his two loan spells at Barnet in 2013–14, he scored four goals in 16 games in all competitions. On 17 May 2014, López was released by Stevenage.

López joined Segunda División B side La Roda on 22 January 2015.

=== La Roda ===
Dani only spent half a season at La Roda. He played 16 times scoring on four occasions.

=== Inverness Caledonian Thistle ===
On 13 July 2015, Dani Lopez joined Scottish Premiership side Inverness CT on a one-year contract. He scored his first, and only league goal for the club in a 4–2 loss against Celtic. His one-year contract was cancelled by mutual consent on 12 January 2016.

== Career statistics ==
As of 16 April 2014

Appearances and goals by club, season and competition
Club	Season	League (Note: IncludesFootball League.)		FA Cup		League Cup		Other (Note: Includes Football League Trophy.)		Total	
Club	Season	Apps	Goals	Apps	Goals	Apps	Goals	Apps	Goals	Apps	Goals
Stevenage	2012–13	10	3	1	0	0	0	0	0	11	3
Stevenage	2013–14	3	0	0	0	0	0	0	0	3	0
Stevenage	Total	13	3	1	0	0	0	0	0	14	3
Aldershot Town (loan)	2012–13	12	6	0	0	0	0	0	0	12	6
Barnet (loan)	2012–13	5	3	0	0	0	0	0	0	5	3
Barnet (loan)	2013–14	15	2	1	2	0	0	0	0	16	4
Career total		45	14	2	2	0	0	0	0	47	16
