= James Dunne (footballer, born 1989) =

English footballer

Personal information
- Full name: James William Dunne
- Date of birth: 18 September 1989 (age 37)
- Place of birth: Farnborough, England
- Height: 5 ft 11 in (1.80 m)
- Position: Midfielder

Team information
- Current team: AFC Croydon Athletic

Youth career
- 1998–2004: Wimbledon
- 2004–2007: Arsenal

Senior career*
Years	Team	Apps	(Gls)
2007–2009	Arsenal	0	(0)
2009–2012	Exeter City	127	(7)
2012–2014	Stevenage	55	(7)
2014	→ St Johnstone (loan)	20	(1)
2014–2016	Portsmouth	36	(1)
2015–2016	→ Dagenham & Redbridge (loan)	9	(0)
2016–2017	Cambridge United	52	(2)
2017–2019	Swindon Town	69	(1)
2019–2021	Barnet	47	(0)
2021–2022	Southend United	23	(2)
2022–2023	Welling United	40	(0)
2023–2024	Dover Athletic	26	(4)
2024	Chatham Town	24	(0)
2024–2025	Ashford United	25	(5)
2025–	AFC Croydon Athletic	33	(1)
- * Club domestic league appearances and goals as of 00:42, 16 February 2025 (UTC)

James William Dunne (born 18 September 1989) is an English professional footballer who plays for Isthmian League South East Division club AFC Croydon Athletic. He is a box to box midfielder.

Dunne started his career at Wimbledon's youth academy, before moving to Arsenal in 2004. He was loaned to Nottingham Forest in 2008, where he made no first team appearances, He joined Exeter City in July 2009 after his release from Arsenal, and went on to make over 100 appearances for the club over three seasons. In May 2012, Dunne joined League One club Stevenage. He was loaned to Scottish Premier League side St Johnstone in 2014, where he won the Scottish Cup. He signed for Portsmouth in 2014 and joined Dagenham and Redbridge on loan in 2015. He signed for Cambridge United in 2016 and then Swindon in 2017.

== Career ==
=== Youth and Arsenal ===
Born in Farnborough, London, Dunne began his career in the Wimbledon academy. Dunne spent six years at Wimbledon, before moving to Arsenal, along with Kieran Gibbs and Abu Ogogo, when Wimbledon disbanded in 2004 and relocated to Milton Keynes. He played in both defensive midfield and right midfield for Arsenal's U18s on their way to the FA Youth Cup semi-final during the 2006–07 season, as well as playing regularly for the reserves. After impressing while progressing through the youth ranks, Dunne signed a professional contract with Arsenal on 20 September 2007. In October 2008, Dunne went on trial with Nottingham Forest, playing for the reserve side in a 2–1 win over Shrewsbury Town.

==== Nottingham Forest (loan) ====
He signed for Nottingham Forest on loan shortly after, until January 2009, with a view to a permanent move. However, he made no first-team appearances during the three-month loan spell, and returned to Arsenal in January 2009.

On his return to Arsenal, Dunne was told his contract would not be renewed when it expired in May 2009, and the club encouraged him to look for a new club. He trialled with Charlton Athletic in February 2009, although no transfer materialised. Dunne was released by Arsenal at the end of 2008–09 season, having made no first-team appearances for the club.

=== Exeter City ===
Ahead of the 2009–10 season, Dunne spent pre-season with newly promoted League One side Exeter City, and signed for the club in July 2009. He made his debut for Exeter in a 3–0 away defeat to Gillingham on 5 September 2009, playing the first 61 minutes of the match. Dunne scored his first professional goal in only his third start, scoring in injury-time with a 30-yard "swerving drive" as Exeter secured a 3–1 win against Hartlepool United. Dunne's second goal of the season came in March 2010; scoring a last-minute winner with a header at the back post in Exeter's 1–0 home victory over Bristol Rovers. The goal gave Exeter their first league win in over two months. He scored a further goal against Swindon Town a month later, and went on to make 26 appearances for Exeter in his maiden season with the club — with Exeter narrowly avoiding relegation by a point. Dunne was ever-present for Exeter during the 2010–11 season, making 50 appearances in all competitions. He scored one goal during the campaign, netting the only goal of the game in Exeter's 1–0 win over local rivals Plymouth Argyle in April 2011.

Dunne's next goal for the club, his first goal of the 2011–12 season, was also against Plymouth, with the player scoring from just inside the area with a neat finish in a Football League Trophy tie, which Exeter would ultimately go on to win on penalties. He also netted in a memorable 4–4 draw away at Sheffield United in October 2011. Dunne's angled strike came with just four minutes remaining, and salvaged a draw for Exeter after they had trailed to Matt Phillips' second goal just moments earlier. His third and final goal of the season, which also turned out to be his last goal for Exeter, came in the club's 3–1 home defeat to fellow relegation rivals Wycombe Wanderers on 20 March 2012. Dunne was, again, a permanent fixture in the side throughout the season, making 51 appearances and scoring three goals as Exeter were relegated back to League Two. During his three years with the club, he scored seven times in 127 games.

=== Stevenage ===
Dunne signed for League One side Stevenage in May 2012. Although he was out of contract at Exeter, Stevenage still had to pay a fee for the player because Dunne was under 24 years of age. The fee for Dunne was set by a tribunal after the two clubs failed to agree a price for the player. This fee was later revealed as an initial £75,000, with a further £50,000 payment dependent on appearances. The move reunited Dunne with then Stevenage manager Gary Smith, who had previously coached him during his time at Wimbledon. He made a goalscoring debut in Stevenage's 3–1 home win over AFC Wimbledon in the League Cup, taking advantage of Seb Brown's goalkeeping mistake, tapping the ball into an empty net, to double Stevenage's lead shortly before half-time. Dunne scored his second goal for the club in November 2012, netting with a 30-yard effort in a 3–2 away defeat to Rotherham United in the FA Cup. Three days after his strike against Rotherham, on 6 November, Dunne was on the scoresheet again, this time netting with a low drive, Stevenage's third of the match, in a 3–1 away victory against Yeovil Town. His fourth goal of the season came in the club's first home game of 2013, rifling in a shot from 30-yards to give Stevenage the lead in an eventual 2–1 defeat to Doncaster Rovers. Dunne added to his tally the following month, scoring from the edge of the area in another 2–1 home loss, this time to Oldham Athletic. He scored in Stevenage's next match three days later, on 23 February 2013, his sixth of the campaign, in a 2–1 defeat to Shrewsbury Town at New Meadow. Dunne made 45 appearances and scored six times in his first season with the club. He won both the Player of the Year and Players' Player of the Year awards at the end of the season.

Ahead of the 2013–14 season, Dunne had attracted interests from Championship and League One clubs, including Celtic, Bristol City and Bournemouth. Manager Graham Westley would sell Dunne and Lucas Akins if the price for the duo is right. After not featuring for one match in the opening game of the season, Dunne made his first appearance of the season, coming on as a substitute in the 49th minute, in a 1–0 loss against Swindon Town. Two weeks later, Dunne scored his first goal of the season in injury-time goal, to give Stevenage their first win of the 2012–13 season against Notts County. A sustained injury in training, result Dunne being out for three weeks. Expected to be out for three weeks, Dunne made his return, in a 3–1 loss against Carlisle United on 21 September 2013.

Despite recovering from injury, Dunne lost his first team place under Westley and hadn't started a game since October, as the club continued to struggle in the league, near to the relegation zone. This is believed by Westley about the squad was being warned his under-performing squad that this affect their future at Stevenage Dunne was overshadowed with the likes of Michael Doughty and Simon Heslop taking over his position in the starting eleven. When the January transfer window open, Dunne was then being placed on the transfer list. In all appearance for Stevenage, Dunne scored seven times in all 50 appearances. It was later revealed that he was overshadowed in the first team because the club was unwilling to pay £50,000 to his previous club, Exeter City, if Dunne made one more appearance for the club and says he described being sidelined in the first team as so "sudden". Following his return from a loan spell at St Johnstone, Dunne signed a new contract, with a one-year deal with Stevenage.

==== St Johnstone (loan) ====
On 27 January 2014, Dunne joined Scottish Premiership club St Johnstone on loan for the remainder of the 2013–14 season. Dunne confirmed his move to Sky Sports Radio.

Dunne made his debut in the fifth round of Scottish Cup and scored the final goal of a 4–0 victory over Forfar Athletic. After the match, Manager Tommy Wright praised Dunne, quoting "he took the goal really well, it was a great finish." Dunne established himself in the St Johnstone's team in central midfield. He played a significant part in the club's progress to the Scottish Cup final when he set up a goal for Stevie May to equalise against Aberdeen in the semi-final of Scottish Cup. St Johnstone would win 2–1 to reach their first Scottish Cup Final. In the final of In the final of Scottish Cup, Dunne played the whole 90 minutes, as St Johnstone beat Dundee United 2–0 to win the club's first Scottish Cup in their first final appearance. Ahead of the final, Dunne described the timing of St Johnstone and Arsenal playing on the same day in the Scottish Cup and FA Cup final respectively was "weird", though he believed both clubs would win on the cup. The club's chairman, however, revealed that he tried signing Dunne permanently, but unexpectedly low takings from the final prevented this, quoting: "We made a bid for James Dunne at Stevenage but the figures I was given for the cup was nothing like the reality. That amount of money has not materialsed. It's £120,000 less. The SFA take something like a 42 per cent cut of the figure I was given."

=== Portsmouth ===
On 24 June 2014, Dunne signed a two-year deal with Football League Two side Portsmouth, for a five-figure sum.

Dunne made his debut for the club, in the opening game of the season, playing the whole minutes as a central midfielder, in a 1–1 draw to Exeter City. Since making his debut, Dunne became a first team regular, having made an impression for the side and scored his first Pompey goal in a 3–0 home win against Dagenham & Redbridge on 16 September 2014. However, by the rest of 2014, Dunne suffered a setbacks of suspension and a knee injury. It wasn't until on 28 December 2014 when he returned to the first team from injury, coming on as a second-half substitute, in a 1–1 draw against Luton Town. Although Dunne suffered a setback of suspension and injury, Dunne continued to be a first team regular later in the season and went on to finish his first season, making thirty-eight appearances and scoring once in all competitions.

However, in the 2015–16 season, Dunne was rarely featured in the first team, under the new management of Paul Cook. This came after when Dunne, along with Andy Barcham and Johannes Ertl, were not included in the club's pre-season tour in Portugal. As a result, Dunne played in the club's reserve in the last four months there. Dunne was also able to make one appearance in the 2015–16 season, which came in a 2–1 loss against Reading in the second round of the League Cup on 25 August 2015.

==== Dagenham and Redbridge (loan) ====
With one appearance for the side, Dunne joined Dagenham & Redbridge on an emergency loan on 27 October 2015. He made his Dagenham & Redbridge debut on 1 November 2015, playing the whole game, in a 1–0 win over Luton Town. His first goal for the club came on 17 November 2015 in a 4–2 win over Morecambe in the first round replay of the FA Cup. A week later, on 24 November 2015, he then set up a goal for Jamie Cureton to score the winning goal, in a 1–0 win over Wimbledon. Shortly after, Dunne had his loan spell with the club extended until 2 January 2016. However, in a 3–2 win over Whitehawk in the FA Cup second round replay, he was sent-off for a second bookable offence in extra time. In January 2016, he returned to his parent club.

=== Cambridge United ===
Soon after his loan spell at Dagenham & Redbridge came to an end, Dunne joined Cambridge United on 14 January 2016, until the end of the 2015–16 season.

Dunne made his Cambridge United debut on 16 January 2016, starting the whole game, in a 0–0 draw against Luton Town. Since making his debut, Dunne established himself as a first team regular until missing out one game against his former club, Portsmouth, due to a gentleman's agreement as part of the transfer deal. After this, Dunne continued to be a first team regular since returning to the first team and scored his first Cambridge United goal, in a 1–0 win over Newport County on 9 April 2016. At the end of the season, making nineteen appearances and scoring once, Dunne signed a one-year contract extension with the club.

Ahead of the 2016–17 season, Dunne switched number shirt from 16 to 4. Since the start of the season, Dunne continued to be a first team regular until he suffered ankle injury that kept him out throughout September. After returning to the first team, Dunne then captained Cambridge United for the first time in the EFL Trophy match against Scunthorpe United on 8 November 2016. Under new Manager Shaun Derry, Dunne began to play new role as a defensive midfielder. Dunne's performance resulted him being praised by Manager Derry and local newspaper Cambridge News. Although he suffered setbacks of suspension and injury, Dunne's first team return resulted him making forty-two appearances and scoring once in all competitions.

At the end of the 2016–17 season, Dunne was released by the club after the club decided against offering him a new contract. However, Dunne's release dismayed Cambridge United supporters, who believed he should be offered a new contract.

=== Swindon Town ===
On 26 June 2017, Dunne joined League Two side Swindon Town on a two-year deal.

He was released by Swindon at the end of the 2018–19 season.

=== Barnet ===
Dunne signed for Barnet on a two-year deal in July 2019. He spent two seasons with the Bees, making 57 appearances before being released.

=== Southend United ===
He then joined Southend United on a two-year deal in June 2021. He scored twice in 26 games before being released in June 2022. also was on loan at Bromley during 2021.

=== Welling United ===
Dunne joined Welling United for the 2022–23 season.

=== Dover Athletic ===
In July 2023, Dunne signed for National League South club Dover Athletic.

=== Chatham Town ===
On 1 February 2024, Dunne joined Isthmian League Premier Division club Chatham Town.

=== Ashford United ===
In May 2024, Dunne joined Isthmian South East Division side Ashford United.

=== AFC Croydon Athletic ===
On 1 February 2025, Dunne joined Isthmian League South East Division side AFC Croydon Athletic.

== Career statistics ==
As of match played 25 January 2025

Appearances and goals by club, season and competition
Club	Season	League			National Cup		League Cup		Other		Total	
Club	Season	Division	Apps	Goals	Apps	Goals	Apps	Goals	Apps	Goals	Apps	Goals
Arsenal	2008–09	Premier League	0	0	0	0	0	0	0	0	0	0
Nottingham Forest (loan)	2008–09	Championship	0	0	—		—		—		0	0
Exeter City	2009–10	League One	23	3	2	0	0	0	1 (Note: Appearances in Football League Trophy)	0	26	3
Exeter City	2010–11	League One	42	1	1	0	1	0	6	0	50	1
Exeter City	2011–12	League One	45	2	2	0	2	0	2	1	51	3
Exeter City	Total		110	6	5	0	3	0	9	1	127	7
Stevenage	2012–13	League One	42	4	1	1	2	1	0	0	45	6
Stevenage	2013–14	League One	13	1	0	0	1	0	0	0	14	1
Stevenage	Total		55	5	1	1	3	1	0	0	59	7
St Johnstone (loan)	2013–14	Scottish Premiership	13	0	4	1	0	0	—		17	1
Portsmouth	2014–15	League Two	36	1	0	0	1	0	1	0	38	1
Portsmouth	2015–16	League Two	0	0	—		1	0	—		1	0
Portsmouth	Total		36	1	0	0	2	0	1	0	39	1
Dagenham & Redbridge (loan)	2015–16	League Two	9	0	4	1	—		1	0	14	1
Cambridge United	2015–16	League Two	19	1	—		—		—		19	1
Cambridge United	2016–17	League Two	33	1	4	0	2	0	3	0	42	1
Cambridge United	Total		52	2	4	0	2	0	3	0	61	2
Swindon Town	2017–18	League Two	39	0	2	0	1	0	4	0	46	0
Swindon Town	2018–19	League Two	30	1	2	0	0	0	2	0	34	1
Swindon Town	Total		69	1	4	0	1	0	6	0	80	1
Barnet	2019–20	National League	25	0	2	0	0	0	6 (Note: Four appearances in FA Trophy, two appearances in National League playoffs)	0	33	0
Barnet	2020–21	National League	22	0	1	0	0	0	1 (Note: Appearance(s) in FA Trophy)	0	24	0
Barnet	Total		47	0	3	0	0	0	7	0	57	0
Southend United	2021–22	National League	23	2	2	0	0	0	1	0	26	2
Welling United	2022–23	National League South	40	0	3	0	—		2	0	45	0
Dover Athletic	2023–24	National League South	26	4	2	0	—		1	0	29	4
Chatham Town	2023–24	Isthmian League Premier Division	12	0	0	0	—		6 (Note: Three appearances in Alan Turvey Trophy, one appearance in Kent Senior Cup, two appearances in Isthmian League Premier Division play-offs)	0	18	0
Ashford United	2024–25	Isthmian League South East Division	25	5	6	0	—		4	0	35	5
Career total			515	26	37	3	11	1	41	1	607	31

== Honours ==
St Johnstone

- Scottish Cup (1): 2013–14

Individual

- Stevenage Player of the Year (1): 2012–13
