= 2019–20 Salford City F.C. season =

Salford City F.C.
2019–20 season
- Owner: Peter Lim 40%; Phil Neville 10%; Gary Neville 10%; Nicky Butt 10%; Paul Scholes 10%; Ryan Giggs 10%; David Beckham 10%
- Chairman: Karen Baird
- Manager: Graham Alexander
- Stadium: Moor Lane
- League Two: 11th
- FA Cup: First round
- EFL Cup: First round
- EFL Trophy: Winners
- Top goalscorer: League: Adam Rooney (8); All: Adam Rooney (9)
- Highest home attendance: All: 4,518 (13 Aug 2019 v Leeds United, EFL Cup); League: 3,770 (17 Aug 2019 v Port Vale)
- Lowest home attendance: League: 2,389 (14 Sep 2019 v Cheltenham); All: 505 (3 Dec 2019 v Wolverhampton Wanderers U21, EFL Trophy)
- Average home league attendance: 3,102
Home colours	Away colours	Third colours

The 2019–20 season was Salford City's 80th season in their existence and first ever season in League Two following the club's promotion via the play-offs the previous season. Along with competing in League Two, the club participated in the FA Cup, League Cup and EFL Trophy.

The season covers the period from 1 July 2019 to 30 June 2020.

== Pre-season ==
The Ammies announced pre-season friendlies against Atherton Collieries, Woking, Middlesbrough and FC Halifax Town.

1 July 2019 Friendly	Atherton Collieries	0–1	Salford City	Atherton
19:45 BST		Report	Dieseruvwe 85'	Stadium: Alder House

19 July 2019 Friendly	Salford City	1–3	Woking	Salford
19:30 BST	Towell 26'	Report	Gerring 22'; Tarpey 52'; Hodges 87'	Stadium: Peninsula Stadium

23 July 2019 Friendly	Salford City	1–3	Middlesbrough	Salford
19:30 BST	Maynard 20'		Assombalonga 35', 45', 66'	Stadium: Peninsula Stadium

27 July 2019 Friendly	Daisy Hill	1–0	Salford City XI	Bolton
15:00 BST				Stadium: New Sirs

27 July 2019 Friendly	Bolton Wanderers	1–0	Salford City	Bolton
	Oztumer (?)	Report		Attendance: Behind closed doors

27 July 2019 Friendly	FC Halifax Town	v	Salford City	Halifax
15:00 BST				Stadium: MBi Shay
Note: Match was cancelled due to issues with the pitch.

27 July 2019 Friendly	Northwich Victoria	4-4	Salford City XI	Wincham
15:00 BST	Brownhill 7' 44'; Crowther 66' 87'	Report		Stadium: Wincham Park

== Competitions ==
=== League Two ===
==== League table ====
Pos	Team	Pld	W	D	L	GF	GA	GD	Pts	PPG	Promotion, qualification or relegation
7	Northampton Town (O, P)	37	17	7	13	54	40	+14	58	1.57	Qualification for League Two play-offs (Note: Four teams play for one spot and promotion to EFL League One.)
8	Port Vale	37	14	15	8	50	44	+6	57	1.54	
9	Bradford City	37	14	12	11	44	40	+4	54	1.46	
10	Forest Green Rovers	36	13	10	13	43	40	+3	49	1.36	
11	Salford City	37	13	11	13	49	46	+3	50	1.35	
12	Walsall	36	13	8	15	40	49	−9	47	1.31	
13	Crawley Town	37	11	15	11	51	47	+4	48	1.30	
14	Newport County	36	12	10	14	32	39	−7	46	1.28	
15	Grimsby Town	37	12	11	14	45	51	−6	47	1.27	

Source: EFL Official Website
Rules for classification: 1) Points per game; 2) Goal difference; 3) Number of goals scored; 4) Head-to-head results; 5) Wins; 6) Away goals; 7) Penalty points (sec 9.5); 8) 12-point sending off offences
(O) Play-off winners; (P) Promoted

==== Results summary ====
Overall								Home						Away					
Pld	W	D	L	GF	GA	GD	Pts	W	D	L	GF	GA	GD	W	D	L	GF	GA	GD
37	13	11	13	49	46	+3	50	5	6	8	20	24	−4	8	5	5	29	22	+7

Last updated: 7 March 2020.
Source: BBC

==== Results by matchday ====
Matchday	1	2	3	4	5	6	7	8	9	10	11	12	13	14	15	16	17	18	19	20	21	22	23	24	25	26	27	28	29	30	31	32	33	34	35	36	37
Ground	H	A	H	A	A	H	A	H	H	A	H	A	H	A	A	H	A	H	H	A	H	A	H	A	A	H	H	A	H	A	A	H	H	A	H	A	H
Result	W	L	D	D	D	D	D	L	W	L	L	W	W	L	W	D	W	L	D	L	L	D	W	W	L	L	L	W	D	W	D	D	L	W	L	W	W
Position	3	11	14	15	15	16	15	19	16	17	18	17	14	18	15	12	11	12	12	13	14	14	11	11	11	12	14	13	12	12	11	11	11	11	13	10	10

Updated to match(es) played on 7 March 2020. Source: Statto.com
A = Away; H = Home; W = Win; D = Draw; L = Loss

==== Matches ====
On Thursday, 20 June 2019, the EFL League Two fixtures were revealed.

3 August 2019 1	Salford City	2–0	Stevenage	Salford
12:30 BST	Dieseruvwe 29', 48'; Towell (yellow card) 45+1'	Report		Stadium: Peninsula Stadium; Attendance: 3,416; Referee: Kevin Johnson
Note: Live on Sky Sports

10 August 2019 2	Crawley Town	2–0	Salford City	Crawley
15:00 BST	Lubala 36' (pen.) (yellow card) 70'; Dallison (yellow card) 45+3'; Ferguson 55'	Report	Piergianni (yellow card) 41'; Jones (yellow card) 46'	Stadium: Broadfield Stadium; Attendance: 2,400; Referee: Graham Salisbury

17 August 2019 3	Salford City	1–1	Port Vale	Salford
15:00 BST	Dieseruvwe (yellow card) 47'; Piergianni (yellow card) 73'; Touray (yellow card) 86'; Beesley 90+3'	Report	Bennett 81'	Stadium: Moor Lane; Attendance: 3,770; Referee: Anthony Backhouse

20 August 2019 4	Plymouth Argyle	2–2	Salford City	Plymouth
19:45 BST	Mayor 43'; Telford 89' (pen.); Lolos (yellow card) 90+4'	Report	Beesley 37'; Dieseruvwe (yellow card) 73'; Touray 79'; Towell (yellow card) 88'	Stadium: Home Park; Attendance: 11,405; Referee: Sam Purkiss

24 August 2019 5	Carlisle United	2–2	Salford City	Carlisle
15:00 BST	Olomola 7'; Scougall 43'	Report	Wiseman (yellow card) 4'; Dieseruvwe 28'; Whitehead 33' (pen.)	Stadium: Brunton Park; Attendance: 4,806; Referee: Paul Marsden

31 August 2019 6	Salford City	1–1	Leyton Orient	Salford
15:00 BST	Towell 13'; Rooney (yellow card) 62'; Piergianni (yellow card) 77'; Dieseruvwe (yellow card) 90+3'	Report	Neal 87' (o.g.)	Stadium: The Peninsula Stadium; Attendance: 3,154; Referee: Marc Edwards

7 September 2019 7	Morecambe	2–2	Salford City	Morecambe
15:00 BST	Miller 48'; Alessandra 50'; Conlan (yellow card) 61'	Report	Lloyd 15', 66' (penalty missed) 31'; Towell (penalty missed) 88'	Stadium: Globe Arena; Attendance: 2,778; Referee: Joshua Smith

14 September 2019 8	Salford City	0–2	Cheltenham Town	Salford
15:00 BST	Burgess (yellow card) 66'	Report	Broom 32', 82' (yellow card) 83'	Stadium: The Peninsula Stadium; Attendance: 2,389; Referee: Craig Hicks

17 September 2019 9	Salford City	1–0	Grimsby Town	Salford
19:45 BST	Shelton 21'	Report	Cook (yellow card) 24'	Stadium: The Peninsula Stadium; Attendance: 2,782; Referee: Chris Sarginson

21 September 2019 10	Crewe Alexandra	4–1	Salford City	Crewe
15:00 BST	Porter 50'; Lowery 57', 82'; Pickering 62'	Report	Hughes (yellow card) 34'; Rooney 39'	Stadium: Alexandra Stadium; Attendance: 4,714; Referee: Will Finnie

28 September 2019 11	Salford City	0–4	Forest Green Rovers	Salford
15:00 BST	Touray (yellow card) 34'; Maynard (yellow card) 38'; Dieseruvwe (yellow card) 39'	Report	Stevens 3', 59'; Collins 16'; Adams 31'; Thomas (yellow card) 57'	Stadium: The Peninsula Stadium; Attendance: 2,561; Referee: James Oldham

5 October 2019 12	Walsall	0–3	Salford City	Bescot
15:00 BST		Report	Armstrong 21'; Rooney (yellow card) 29'; Jervis 49'; Jones (yellow card) 65'; Touray 72'; Burgess (yellow card) 90+3'	Stadium: Banks's Stadium; Attendance: 4,751; Referee: Trevor Kettle

12 October 2019 13	Salford City	1–0	Cambridge United	Salford
15:00 BST	Maynard (yellow card) 34'; Rooney 77'	Report		Stadium: The Peninsula Stadium; Attendance: 3,026; Referee: Carl Boyeson

19 October 2019 14	Northampton Town	2–0	Salford City	Northampton
15:00 BST	Hoskins 35' (pen.); McCormack (yellow card) 41'; Harriman (yellow card) 47'; Wharton (yellow card) 61'; Turnbull 66'; Waters (yellow card) 75'	Report	Burgess (yellow card) 35'; Jones (yellow card) 42'	Stadium: PTS Academy Stadium; Attendance: 4,886; Referee: Lee Swabey

22 October 2019 15	Mansfield Town	1–2	Salford City	Mansfield
19:45 BST	Maynard 77'; Bishop (yellow card) 90+4'	Report	Jervis 48'; Jones (yellow card) 53'; Rooney 65'; Touray (yellow card) 86'	Stadium: One Call Stadium; Attendance: 4,170; Referee: Neil Hair

26 October 2019 16	Salford City	1–1	Scunthorpe United	Salford
15:00 BST	Armstrong (yellow card) 15'; Burgess 45+2'	Report	van Veen 34'	Stadium: The Peninsula Stadium; Attendance: 3,448; Referee: Sam Purkiss

2 November 2019 17	Newport County	1–2	Salford City	Newport
15:00 GMT	Pond 45+1' (o.g.); Bennett (yellow card) 56'; Sheehan (yellow card) 67'; Abrahams (penalty missed) 81'	Report	Burgess 40'; Maynard 54'; Threlkeld (yellow card) 64'; Hughes (yellow card) 88'	Stadium: Rodney Parade; Attendance: 3,947; Referee: Will Finnie

16 November 2019 18	Salford City	2–3	Swindon Town	Salford
15:00 GMT	Rooney 4' (pen.), 90+5' (pen.); Burgess (yellow card) 26'; Dieseruvwe (yellow card) 45+7'	Report	Doyle 10', 54' (pen.); Yates 78'	Stadium: The Peninsula Stadium; Attendance: 3,509; Referee: Leigh Doughty

23 November 2019 19	Salford City	0–0	Macclesfield Town	Salford
15:00 GMT	Pond (yellow card) 30'; Whitehead (yellow card) 71'	Report	McCourt (yellow card) 71'; Kirby (yellow card) 89'; Evans (yellow card) 90+1'	Stadium: The Peninsula Stadium; Attendance: 2,484; Referee: Matt Donohue

7 December 2019 20	Colchester United	1–0	Salford City	Colchester
15:00 GMT	Comley (yellow card) 56'; Pell 90+3'	Report	Towell (yellow card) 31'; Armstrong (yellow card) 60'	Stadium: JobServe Community Stadium; Attendance: 3,713; Referee: Josh Smith

14 December 2019 21	Salford City	0–1	Exeter City	Salford
15:00 GMT	Maynard (yellow card) 58'	Report	Martin (yellow card) 28'; Bowman 33'	Stadium: The Peninsula Stadium; Attendance: 2,922; Referee: Seb Stockbridge

21 December 2019 22	Bradford City	1–1	Salford City	Bradford
15:00 GMT	Pritchard 53'	Report	Rooney 79'	Stadium: Northern Commercials Stadium; Attendance: 14,642; Referee: Carl Boyeson

26 December 2019 23	Salford City	3–1	Crewe Alexandra	Salford
15:00 GMT	Towell 7'; Thomas-Asante 12'; Jones (yellow card) 14'; Neal (yellow card) 40'; Touray (yellow card) 44'; Wintle 85' (o.g.)	Report	Powell (yellow card) 45+1'; Pickering 82'	Stadium: The Peninsula Stadium; Attendance: 3,031; Referee: Peter Wright

29 December 2019 24	Oldham Athletic	1–4	Salford City	Oldham
15:00 GMT	Fage (yellow card) 25'; Morais (penalty missed) 53'; Segbe Azankpo 58'	Report	Jervis 15', 36'; Thomas-Asante 16', 48'; Threlkeld (yellow card) 52'	Stadium: Boundary Park; Attendance: 5,278; Referee: Darren Handley

1 January 2020 25	Grimsby Town	1–0	Salford City	Cleethorpes
15:00 GMT	Rose 83'	Report	Towell (yellow card) 60'	Stadium: Blundell Park; Attendance: 4,555; Referee: Martin Coy

4 January 2020 26	Salford City	1–2	Walsall	Salford
15:00 GMT	Thomas-Asante 62'; Hogan (yellow card) 71'; Touray (yellow card) 81'	Report	Lavery 27'; Gordon 51'	Stadium: The Peninsula Stadium; Attendance: 3,173; Referee: Christopher Pollard

11 January 2020 27	Salford City	1–2	Northampton Town	Salford
15:00 GMT	Baldwin 20' (yellow card) 67'; Thomas-Asante (yellow card) 22'	Report	Hoskins 29' (yellow card) 46'; Williams 63'; Lines (yellow card) 69'; Cornell (yellow card) 85'; Turnbull (yellow card) 90+5'	Stadium: The Peninsula Stadium; Attendance: 2,919; Referee: Ross Joyce

18 January 2020 28	Forest Green Rovers	1–2	Salford City	Nailsworth
15:00 GMT	March 11'; Rawson (yellow card) 90+3'	Report	Touray 3'; Hunter (yellow card) 14' (yellow-red card) 90+5'; O'Connor (yellow card) 38' (goal) 55'; Towell (yellow card) 63' (yellow-red card) 75'; Pond (yellow card) 80'	Stadium: The New Lawn; Attendance: 2,707; Referee: Nick Kinseley

25 January 2020 29	Salford City	1–1	Oldham Athletic	Salford
15:00 GMT	Rooney (penalty missed) 15'; Thomas-Asante 16'; Baldwin (yellow card) 59'	Report	Mills (yellow card) 15'; Maouche (yellow card) 16'; Rowe 83'; Nepomuceno (yellow card) 90'	Stadium: The Peninsula Stadium; Attendance: 3,646; Referee: Josh Smith

28 January 2020 30	Cambridge United	0–4	Salford City	Cambridge
19:45 GMT	Jones (yellow card) 33'; O'Neil (yellow card) 63'; Lewis (yellow card) 84'	Report	Rooney 32', 52' (pen.); Thomas-Asante (yellow card) 45'; Hunter 55'; Andrade (yellow card) 83'; Touray 88'	Stadium: Abbey Stadium; Attendance: 3,444; Referee: Christopher Pollard

1 February 2020 31	Port Vale	1–1	Salford City	Burslem
15:00 GMT	Burgess 55' (o.g.)	Report	Elliott 75'; Rooney (yellow card) 79'; Hunter (yellow card) 85'; Hogan (yellow card) 90+5'	Stadium: Vale Park; Attendance: 5,281; Referee: Neil Hair

8 February 2020 32	Salford City	0–0	Crawley Town	Salford
15:00 GMT	Hunter (yellow card) 61'	Report	Sesay (yellow card) 54'; Palmer (yellow card) 61'; Nadesan (yellow card) 61'	Stadium: Peninsula Stadium; Attendance: 2,385; Referee: Leigh Doughty

11 February 2020 33	Salford City	2–3	Plymouth Argyle	Salford
19:45 GMT	Baldwin (yellow card) 52'; Wilson 62', 69'	Report	Moore 19'; Mayor (yellow card) 54'; Sarcevic (yellow card) 54' (goal) 67'; Wootton (yellow card) 90+1'; Hardie 90+2'	Stadium: Peninsula; Attendance: 2,297; Referee: Paul Marsden

15 February 2020 34	Stevenage	0–1	Salford City	Stevenage
15:00 GMT	Soares (yellow card) 59'; Parrett (yellow card) 90+2'	Report	Baldwin (yellow card) 26'; Thomas-Asante 32' (yellow card) 68'; O'Connor (yellow card) 37'; Touray (yellow card) 90'	Stadium: The Lamex Stadium; Attendance: 3,246; Referee: Alan Young

22 February 2020 35	Salford City	1–2	Colchester United	Salford
15:00 GMT	Hunter 43'; Touray (yellow card) 70'; Gibson (yellow card) 90+5'	Report	Pell (yellow card) 23'; Poku 27'; Harriott 41'	Stadium: Peninsula Stadium; Attendance: 2,589; Referee: Andy Haines

29 February 2020 36	Macclesfield Town	0–2	Salford City	Macclesfield
15:00 GMT	McCourt (yellow card) 68'	Report	Hunter 30' (yellow card) 43'; Towell 37'	Stadium: Moss Rose; Attendance: 2,317; Referee: Trevor Kettle

7 March 2020 37	Salford City	2–0	Bradford City	Salford
15:00 GMT	Hunter 10', 47'; Gibson (yellow card) 52'	Report		Stadium: Peninsula Stadium; Attendance: 3,443; Referee: Martin Coy

14 March 2020	Exeter City	v	Salford City	Exeter
15:00 GMT				Stadium: St James Park
Note: Season was suspended until 3 April 2020, due to the COVID-19 pandemic.

17 March 2020	Salford City	v	Mansfield Town	Salford
19:45 GMT				Stadium: Peninsula Stadium
Note: Season was suspended until 3 April 2020, due to the COVID-19 pandemic.

21 March 2020	Scunthorpe United	v	Salford City	Scunthorpe
15:00 GMT				Stadium: Sands Venue Stadium
Note: Season was suspended until 3 April 2020, due to the COVID-19 pandemic.

24 March 2020	Swindon Town	v	Salford City	Swindon
19:45 GMT				Stadium: County Ground
Note: Season was suspended until 3 April 2020, due to the COVID-19 pandemic.

28 March 2020	Salford City	v	Newport County	Salford
15:00 GMT				Stadium: Peninsula Stadium
Note: Season was suspended until 3 April 2020, due to the COVID-19 pandemic.

10 April 2020	Salford City	v	Carlisle United	Salford
15:00 BST				Stadium: Peninsula Stadium
Note: On 3 April, the English Football League decided to postpone all football until safe to do so due to the COVID-19 pandemic.

13 April 2020	Leyton Orient	v	Salford City	Leyton
13:00 BST				Stadium: The Breyer Group Stadium
Note: On 3 April, the English Football League decided to postpone all football until safe to do so due to the COVID-19 pandemic.

18 April 2020	Salford City	v	Morecambe	Salford
15:00 BST				Stadium: Peninsula Stadium
Note: On 3 April, the English Football League decided to postpone all football until safe to do so due to the COVID-19 pandemic.

25 April 2020	Cheltenham Town	v	Salford City	Cheltenham
15:00 BST				Stadium: Jonny-Rocks Stadium
Note: On 3 April, the English Football League decided to postpone all football until safe to do so due to the COVID-19 pandemic.

=== FA Cup ===
The first round draw was made on 21 October 2019.

9 November 2019 First round	Salford City	1–1	Burton Albion	Salford
15:00 GMT	Jones (yellow card) 24'; Towell 83'	Report	Fraser 78'; Broadhead (yellow card) 86'	Stadium: The Peninsula Stadium; Attendance: 2,724; Referee: Alan Young

19 November 2019 First round replay	Burton Albion	4–1	Salford City	Burton upon Trent
19:45 GMT	Akins 42'; Brayford (yellow card) 62' (goal) 70'; Templeton 64'; Sarkic 81'	Report	Touray 52'	Stadium: Pirelli Stadium; Attendance: 1,479; Referee: Marc Edwards

=== EFL Cup ===
The first round draw was made on 20 June.

13 August 2019 First round	Salford City	0–3	Leeds United	Salford
19:45 BST		Report	Nketiah 43'; Berardi 50'; Klich 58', (yellow card) 87'	Stadium: Peninsula Stadium; Attendance: 4,518; Referee: Keith Stroud
Note: Live on Sky Sports

=== EFL Trophy ===
On 9 July 2019, the pre-determined group stage draw was announced with Invited clubs to be drawn on 12 July 2019. The draw for the second round was made on 16 November 2019 live on Sky Sports. The third round draw was confirmed on 5 December 2019. The semi-final draw was made on Quest by Ian Holloway and Paul Heckingbottom, on 25 January 2020.

Pos	Div	Team	Pld	W	PW	PL	L	GF	GA	GD	Pts	Qualification
1	L2	Salford City	2	2	0	0	0	4	0	+4	6	Advance to Round 2
2	L1	Tranmere Rovers	2	1	0	0	1	2	3	−1	3	Advance to Round 2
3	ACA	Aston Villa U21	2	0	0	0	2	1	4	−3	0	
4	L1	Bury (Note: This group originally included the expelled Bury.) (E)	0	0	0	0	0	0	0	0	0	Expelled

Source: EFL.com
(E) Eliminated
Notes:

3 September 2019 Group stage	Salford City	2–0	Aston Villa U21	Salford
19:45 BST	Shelton (yellow card) 5'; Smith (yellow card) 29'; Whitehead (yellow card) 60'; Lloyd 80' (pen.); Rooney 82'	Report	Clarke (yellow card) 36'; Rowe (yellow card) 70'	Stadium: The Peninsula Stadium; Attendance: 916; Referee: Rob Lewis

12 November 2019 Group stage	Tranmere Rovers	0–2	Salford City	Birkenhead
19:45 GMT		Report	Threlkeld 2'; Hogan 56'	Stadium: Prenton Park; Referee: J. Adcock

3 December 2019 Second round	Salford City	3–0	Wolverhampton Wanderers U21	Salford
19:45 GMT	Armstrong 43', 47'; Towell 87'	Report	Taylor (yellow card) 72'	Stadium: The Peninsula Stadium; Attendance: 505; Referee: Scott Oldham

7 January 2020 Third round	Salford City	3–0	Port Vale	Salford
19:45 GMT	Burgess 35'; Armstrong 79'; Jervis 84'	Report		Stadium: The Peninsula Stadium; Referee: Christopher Sarginson

21 January 2020 Quarter-final	Salford City	2–1	Accrington Stanley	Salford
19:45 GMT	Burgess 45+3'; Elliott 49'; Conway (yellow card) 54'; Hogan (yellow card) 83'	Report	Finley 11' (yellow card) 35'; Alese (yellow card) 13'; Johnson (yellow card) 45+2'	Stadium: The Peninsula Stadium; Attendance: 1,401

19 February 2020 Semi-final	Newport County	0–0 (5–6 p)	Salford City	Newport
19:45 GMT	Demetriou (yellow card) 11'	Report	Burgess (yellow card) 25'; Baldwin (yellow card) 63'	Stadium: Rodney Parade; Attendance: 4,070; Referee: Anthony Backhouse
	Penalties
	Demetriou (penalty scored); Sheehan (penalty scored); Abrahams (penalty missed); Labadie (penalty scored); Dolan (penalty scored); Matt (penalty scored); Inniss (penalty missed)		Rooney (penalty scored); Touray (penalty scored); Jervis (penalty scored); Conway (penalty scored); Thomas-Asante (penalty missed); Gibson (penalty scored); Wilson (penalty scored)

4 April 2020 Final	Portsmouth	v	Salford City	London
15:00 GMT				Stadium: Wembley Stadium
Note: On 3 April, the English Football League decided to postpone all football until safe to do so due to the COVID-19 pandemic.

13 March 2021 Final	Portsmouth	0–0 (a.e.t.) (2–4 p)	Salford City	London
15:00 GMT	Bolton (yellow card) 73'; Naylor (yellow card) 96'; Brown (yellow card) 114'	Report	Towell (yellow card) 14'; Lowe (yellow card) 90+1'; Touray (yellow card) 118'	Stadium: Wembley Stadium; Attendance: 0 Referee: Carl Boyeson
	Penalties
	Williams (penalty missed); Curtis (penalty missed); Brown (penalty scored); Raggett (penalty scored)		(penalty scored) Burgess; (penalty scored) Dieseruvwe; (penalty scored) Thomas-Asante; (penalty scored) Lowe

== Squad statistics ==
=== Appearances and goals ===
No.	Pos	Nat	Player	Total		League 2		FA Cup		League Cup		League Trophy	
No.	Pos	Nat	Player	Apps	Goals	Apps	Goals	Apps	Goals	Apps	Goals	Apps	Goals
1	GK	(England) ENG	Chris Neal	21	0	15+0	0	2+0	0	1+0	0	3+0	0
2	DF	(Gibraltar) GIB	Scott Wiseman	31	0	25+0	0	1+0	0	0+0	0	2+3	0
3	DF	(The Gambia) GAM	Ibou Touray	42	5	35+0	4	2+0	1	1+0	0	3+1	0
4	DF	(England) ENG	Oscar Threlkeld	27	1	12+6	0	2+0	0	1+0	0	5+1	1
5	DF	(England) ENG	Ashley Eastham	4	0	4+0	0	0+0	0	0+0	0	0+0	0
5	DF	(England) ENG	Liam Hogan	16	1	11+1	0	1+0	0	0+0	0	3+0	1
6	DF	(England) ENG	Carl Piergianni	17	0	11+2	0	1+0	0	1+0	0	2+0	0
7	FW	(England) ENG	Luke Armstrong	26	4	12+9	1	2+0	0	0+0	0	3+0	3
8	MF	(Saint Kitts and Nevis) SKN	Lois Maynard	25	1	21+1	1	1+1	0	1+0	0	0+0	0
9	FW	(Republic of Ireland) IRL	Adam Rooney	38	9	24+8	8	2+0	0	0+1	0	2+1	1
10	MF	(England) ENG	Danny Lloyd	14	3	4+5	2	0+0	0	0+1	0	3+1	1
11	MF	(England) ENG	Tom Walker	5	0	0+4	0	0+0	0	0+0	0	1+0	0
11	DF	(England) ENG	Tom Elliott	10	2	3+5	1	0+0	0	0+0	0	2+0	1
12	GK	(Wales) WAL	Kyle Letheren	22	0	19+0	0	0+0	0	0+0	0	3+0	0
13	DF	(England) ENG	Sam Hughes	10	0	4+4	0	0+0	0	0+0	0	2+0	0
15	DF	(Australia) AUS	Cameron Burgess	35	4	26+3	2	2+0	0	0+0	0	4+0	2
16	DF	(England) ENG	Jack Baldwin	17	1	10+3	1	0+0	0	0+0	0	3+1	0
17	MF	(Republic of Ireland) IRL	Richie Towell	31	5	22+4	3	2+0	1	1+0	0	2+0	1
18	FW	(England) ENG	Danny Whitehead	17	1	7+5	1	0+1	0	1+0	0	3+0	0
19	MF	(England) ENG	Mark Shelton	6	1	5+0	1	0+0	0	0+0	0	1+0	0
20	FW	(England) ENG	Emmanuel Dieseruvwe	27	3	10+10	3	0+2	0	1+0	0	1+3	0
21	FW	(England) ENG	Devante Rodney	3	0	1+2	0	0+0	0	0+0	0	0+0	0
22	DF	(England) ENG	Dan Jones	6	0	3+0	0	0+0	0	0+0	0	3+0	0
23	MF	(Montserrat) MSR	Nathan Pond	27	0	19+3	0	1+0	0	1+0	0	1+2	0
24	MF	(England) ENG	Martin Smith	5	0	3+1	0	0+0	0	0+0	0	1+0	0
25	MF	(Northern Ireland) NIR	Joey Jones	26	0	15+5	0	2+0	0	1+0	0	3+0	0
26	MF	(Portugal) POR	Bruno Andrade	7	0	6+1	0	0+0	0	0+0	0	0+0	0
28	FW	(Ghana) GHA	Brandon Thomas-Asante	26	6	15+5	6	0+1	0	0+0	0	3+2	0
29	FW	(England) ENG	Jake Beesley	8	2	4+3	2	0+0	0	1+0	0	0+0	0
29	MF	(Northern Ireland) NIR	Michael O'Connor	8	1	8+0	1	0+0	0	0+0	0	0+0	0
30	FW	(Republic of Ireland) IRL	Rory Gaffney	3	0	1+1	0	0+0	0	0+1	0	0+0	0
32	FW	(England) ENG	Jake Jervis	25	5	19+1	4	0+0	0	0+0	0	4+1	1
34	MF	(England) ENG	Alex Doyle	2	0	0+1	0	0+0	0	0+0	0	1+0	0
41	GK	(England) ENG	Mark Howard	3	0	3+0	0	0+0	0	0+0	0	0+0	0
43	MF	(Republic of Ireland) IRL	Darron Gibson	4	0	2+1	0	0+0	0	0+0	0	1+0	0
44	MF	(Scotland) SCO	Craig Conway	23	0	15+5	0	1+0	0	0+0	0	1+1	0
45	FW	(England) ENG	Ashley Hunter	11	5	9+2	5	0+0	0	0+0	0	0+0	0
49	FW	(England) ENG	James Wilson	6	2	4+1	2	0+0	0	0+0	0	0+1	0

== Transfers ==
=== Transfers in ===
Date	Position	Nationality	Name	From	Fee	Ref.
1 July 2019	LB	(England)	Dan Jones	(England) Barrow	Free transfer	
1 July 2019	CM	(England)	Joey Jones	(England) Eastleigh	Free transfer	
1 July 2019	CM	(England)	Oscar Threlkeld	(Belgium) Waasland-Beveren	Free transfer	
1 July 2019	CM	(Republic of Ireland)	Richie Towell	(England) Brighton & Hove Albion	Free transfer	
5 July 2019	CF	(Ivory Coast)	Florian Yonsian	(England) Rochdale	Free transfer	
16 July 2019	GK	(Wales)	Kyle Letheren	(England) Plymouth Argyle	Free transfer	
23 July 2019	CM	(England)	Martin Smith	(England) Swindon Town	Free transfer	
26 July 2019	CF	(England)	Luke Armstrong	(England) Middlesbrough	Undisclosed	
30 August 2019	DF	(Australia)	Yianni Nicolaou	(Australia) Marconi Stallions	Undisclosed	
September 2019	CF	(Ghana)	Brandon Thomas-Asante	(England) Ebbsfleet United	Undisclosed	
5 October 2019	LW	(Scotland)	Craig Conway	(England) Blackburn Rovers	Free transfer	
9 January 2020	CF	(England)	Tom Elliott	(England) Millwall	Free transfer	
13 January 2020	SS	(Portugal)	Bruno Andrade	(England) Lincoln City	Undisclosed	
15 January 2020	CM	(Northern Ireland)	Michael O'Connor	(England) Lincoln City	Undisclosed	
31 January 2020	CB	(England)	Ashley Eastham	(England) Fleetwood Town	Undisclosed	
31 January 2020	CF	(England)	James Wilson	(Scotland) Aberdeen	Undisclosed	
6 February 2020	CM	(Republic of Ireland)	Darron Gibson	(England) Wigan Athletic	Free transfer	

=== Transfers out ===
Date	Position	Nationality	Name	To	Fee	Ref.
1 July 2019	CF	(England)	Anthony Dudley	(England) Chester	Released	
1 July 2019	CF	(England)	Matt Green	(England) Grimsby Town	Free transfer	
1 July 2019	CM	(Republic of the Congo)	Amine Linganzi	Free agent	Released	
1 July 2019	CB	(England)	Danny Livesey	(England) Chester	Free transfer	
1 July 2019	CM	(England)	Gus Mafuta	(England) Hartlepool United	Released	
1 July 2019	CM	(England)	Devonte Redmond	(Wales) Wrexham	Contract expired	
1 July 2019	CF	(England)	Jack Redshaw	(England) FC Halifax Town	Released	
18 July 2019	GK	(New Zealand)	Max Crocombe	(Australia) Brisbane Roar	Free transfer	
3 January 2020	CF	(England)	Jake Beesley	(England) Solihull Moors	Undisclosed	
9 January 2020	CM	(England)	Tom Walker	(England) AFC Fylde	Undisclosed	
4 February 2020	CM	(Saint Kitts and Nevis)	Lois Maynard	(England) Stockport County	Free transfer	
14 February 2020	CB	(England)	Liam Hogan	(England) Stockport County	Free transfer	
24 February 2020	CF	(Republic of Ireland)	Rory Gaffney	(Republic of Ireland) Shamrock Rovers	Released	
13 March 2020	CF	(Republic of Ireland)	Adam Rooney	(England) Solihull Moors	Undisclosed	

=== Loans in ===
Date from	Position	Nationality	Name	From	Date until	Ref.
24 July 2019	CB	(Australia)	Cameron Burgess	(England) Scunthorpe United	30 June 2020	
2 September 2019	CB	(England)	Jack Baldwin	(England) Sunderland	30 June 2020	
2 September 2019	CB	(England)	Sam Hughes	(England) Leicester City	23 January 2020	
2 September 2019	RW	(England)	Jake Jervis	(England) Luton Town	30 June 2020	
22 October 2019	GK	(England)	Mark Howard	(England) Blackpool	4 November 2019	
2 January 2020	LW	(England)	Ashley Hunter	(England) Fleetwood Town	30 June 2020	
24 January 2020	RB	(England)	George Tanner	(England) Manchester United	30 June 2020	

=== Loans out ===
Date from	Position	Nationality	Name	To	Date until	Ref.
1 July 2019	LB	(England)	Josh Askew	(England) Curzon Ashton	30 June 2020	
1 July 2019	CM	(England)	Kieran Glynn	(England) Southport	16 January 2020	
1 July 2019	CB	(England)	James Jones	(England) Chester	30 June 2020	
14 August 2019	CF	(England)	Anointed Chukwu	(England) Ramsbottom United	September 2019	
14 August 2019	CF	(England)	Kamar Moncrieffe	(England) Ramsbottom United	21 September 2019	
14 August 2019	CB	(England)	Samuel Adetiloye	(England) Ramsbottom United	September 2019	
14 August 2019	GK	(England)	Ewan McFarlane	(England) Ramsbottom United	September 2019	
31 August 2019	CF	(Republic of Ireland)	Rory Gaffney	(England) Walsall	24 February 2020	
14 September 2019	CB	(England)	Max Broughton	(England) Marine	October 2019	
14 September 2019	CF	(England)	Daniel Hawkins	(England) Marine	November 2019	
7 October 2019	CF	(England)	Jake Beesley	(England) Solihull Moors	3 January 2020	
9 October 2019	RW	(England)	Devante Rodney	(England) Stockport County	6 January 2020	
9 October 2019	MF	(England)	Tom Walker	(England) Stockport County	6 January 2020	
11 October 2019	RM	(England)	Mark Shelton	(England) Woking	30 June 2020	
12 October 2019		(England)	Elliot Johnston	(England) Ashton United	November 2019	
19 October 2019	RB	(England)	Tyrell Warren	(England) Radcliffe	November 2019	
19 October 2019	CF	(England)	Anointed Chukwu	(England) Widnes	19 January 2020	
1 November 2019	MF	(England)	Martin Smith	(England) Chorley	30 June 2020	
7 November 2019	MF	(England)	Mark Howarth	(England) Buxton	December 2019	
7 November 2019	RB	(Australia)	Yianni Nicolaou	(England) Buxton	December 2019	
11 November 2019	MF	(England)	Brandon Lockett	(England) Droylsden	December 2019	
7 December 2019	CF	(England)	Daniel Hawkins	(England) Stafford Rangers	7 February 2020	
7 December 2019	CF	(Ivory Coast)	Florian Yonsian	(England) Stafford Rangers	January 2020	
11 December 2019	MF	(England)	Mark Shelton	(England) Hartlepool United	30 June 2020	
19 December 2019	CB	(England)	Samuel Adetiloye	(England) Widnes	19 January 2020	
24 December 2019	MF	(England)	Mark Howarth	(England) Marine		
6 January 2020	CB	(England)	Carl Piergianni	(England) Oldham Athletic	30 June 2020	
9 January 2020	RW	(England)	Devante Rodney	(England) FC Halifax Town	30 June 2020	
10 January 2020	CF	(England)	Emmanuel Dieseruvwe	(England) Oldham Athletic	30 June 2020	
10 January 2020	CF	(England)	Kamar Moncrieffe	(England) Stafford Rangers		
16 January 2020	MF	(England)	Kieran Glynn	(England) Scarborough Athletic	30 June 2020	
18 January 2020	RB	(Australia)	Yianni Nicolaou	(England) Runcorn Linnets		
18 January 2020	CF	(Ivory Coast)	Florian Yonsian	(England) Marine	February 2020	
21 January 2020	MF	(England)	Danny Whitehead	(England) Macclesfield Town	30 June 2020	
21 January 2020	MF	(England)	Danny Lloyd	(England) Stockport County	30 June 2020	
27 January 2020	MF	(England)	Brandon Lockett	(England) Kendal Town		
10 February 2020	DF	(England)	Dan Jones	(England) Barrow	30 June 2020	
13 February 2020	CF	(England)	Anointed Chukwu	(England) Radcliffe		
21 February 2020	RB	(England)	Tyrell Warren	(England) Boston United		
