= 2024–25 Stevenage F.C. season =

49th season in existence of Stevenage FC

Stevenage F.C.
2024–25 season
- Chairman: Phil Wallace
- Manager: Alex Revell
- Stadium: The Lamex Stadium
- League One: 14th
- FA Cup: Second round
- EFL Cup: First round
- EFL Trophy: Quarter-finals
- Top goalscorer: League: Dan Kemp (5); All: Dan Kemp (6)
- Highest home attendance: 5,704 (1 October 2024 vs. Wrexham)
- Lowest home attendance: 3,357 (10 August 2024 vs. Shrewsbury Town)
- Average home league attendance: 4,111 (18 January 2025)
- Biggest win: 3–0 (14 September 2024 vs. Barnsley) (29 December 2024 vs. Bristol Rovers)
- Biggest defeat: 1–4 (29 October 2024 vs. Bolton Wanderers)
Third colours

The 2024–25 season was the 49th season in the history of Stevenage Football Club and their second consecutive season in League One. In addition to the domestic league, the club also participated in the FA Cup, the EFL Cup, and the 2024–25 EFL Trophy.

== Transfers ==
=== In ===
Date	Pos.	Player	From	Fee	Ref.
14 June 2024	CB	Lewis Freestone (ENG)	Cheltenham Town (ENG)	Undisclosed	
1 July 2024 (Note: The transfer was announced on 24 May, and would become official on 1 July once his Northampton Town contract expired)	CF	Louis Appéré (SCO)	Northampton Town (ENG)	Free	
1 July 2024 (Note: The transfer was announced on 10 June, and would become official on 1 July once his Milton Keynes Dons contract expired)	AM	Dan Kemp (ENG)	Milton Keynes Dons (ENG)	Free	
4 July 2024	DM	Daniel Phillips (TRI)	St Johnstone (SCO)	Free	
26 July 2024	CF	Tyreece Simpson (ENG)	Huddersfield Town (ENG)	Undisclosed	
5 August 2024	CB	Charlie Goode (ENG)	Brentford (ENG)	Free	
30 August 2024	CF	Jake Young (ENG)	Bradford City (ENG)	Undisclosed	
3 February 2025	LW	Kyle Edwards (ENG)	Oxford United (ENG)	Free	

=== Out ===
Date	Pos.	Player	To	Fee	Ref.
25 July 2024	CB	Terence Vancooten (GUY)	Burton Albion (ENG)	Undisclosed	
20 December 2024	RB	Owen Cochrane (ENG)	Maidenhead United (ENG)	Undisclosed	
3 January 2025	CF	Harrison Smith (ENG)	St Albans City (ENG)	Undisclosed	
9 January 2025	CM	Ben Thompson (ENG)	Bromley (ENG)	Undisclosed	
24 January 2025	CB	Nathan Thompson (ENG)	Milton Keynes Dons (ENG)	Undisclosed	

=== Loaned in ===
Date	Pos.	Player	From	Date until	Ref.
3 August 2024	GK	Murphy Cooper (ENG)	Queens Park Rangers (ENG)	End of Season	
12 August 2024	GK	Dean Bouzanis (AUS)	Reading (ENG)	End of Season	
22 August 2024	DM	Eli King (WAL)	Cardiff City (WAL)	End of Season	
30 August 2024	CF	Ken Aboh (ENG)	Norwich City (ENG)	8 January 2025 (Note: On 8 January, Aboh was recalled back to Norwich.)	
31 January 2025	CF	Brandon Hanlan (ENG)	Wycombe Wanderers (ENG)	End of Season	

=== Loaned out ===
Date	Pos.	Player	To	Date until	Ref.
8 August 2024	CF	Harrison Smith (ENG)	Worthing (ENG)	3 January 2025 (Note: On 3 January, Smith was recalled back from his loan at Worthing and subsequently joined St Albans permanently)	
20 August 2024	RB	Owen Cochrane (ENG)	Maidenhead United (ENG)	17 September 2024	
30 August 2024	GK	Rylee Mitchell (ENG)	Oxford City (ENG)	27 September 2024	
30 August 2024	CM	Ben Thompson (ENG)	Bromley (ENG)	9 January 2025 (Note: On 9 January, Thompson joined Bromley on a permanent basis)	
5 October 2024	CF	Makise Evans (ENG)	St Albans City (ENG)	2 November 2024	
25 November 2024	CF	Makise Evans (ENG)	Tonbridge Angels (ENG)	23 December 2024	
4 January 2025	CM	Ryan Doherty (ENG)	Potters Bar Town (ENG)	1 February 2025	
4 January 2025	CB	Louie Henry (ENG)	Potters Bar Town (ENG)	1 February 2025	
9 January 2025	CF	Aaron Pressley (SCO)	Barrow (ENG)	End of Season	
13 January 2025	CF	Makise Evans (ENG)	Bedford Town (ENG)	End of Season	
13 January 2025	CM	David Hicks (ENG)	Aveley (ENG)	End of Season	
20 January 2025	CF	Tyreece Simpson (ENG)	Colchester United (ENG)	End of Season	

=== Released / Out of Contract ===
Date	Pos.	Player	Subsequent club	Join date	Ref.
30 June 2024	CF	Theo Alexandrou (ENG)	St Ives Town (ENG)	1 July 2024	
30 June 2024	RW	Harry Anderson (ENG)	Colchester United (ENG)	1 July 2024	
30 June 2024	CF	Kane Hemmings (ENG)	Crewe Alexandra (ENG)	1 July 2024	
30 June 2024	RM	Alex MacDonald (SCO)	Rotherham United (ENG)	1 July 2024	

== Pre-season and friendlies ==
On 21 May, Stevenage announced their first pre-season friendly, against Jersey Bulls. A day later, a second fixture was confirmed against Watford. On 14 June, the club added a further three fixtures to the schedule, against Norwich City, Coventry City and Chelsea U21s. In July, an away trip to face Braintree Town was announced.

Win Draw Loss Fixtures

9 July 2024 Friendly	Stevenage	Cancelled	Norwich City	Stevenage
19:00 BST				Stadium: Broadhall Way
Note: Fixture was cancelled due to unexpected pitch refurbishment works.

13 July 2024 Friendly	Stevenage	2–2	Watford	Stevenage
15:00 BST	Piergianni; Sweeney	Report	Baah; Louza (pen.)	Stadium: Broadhall Way; Attendance: 1,966

20 July 2024 Friendly	Jersey Bulls	0–3	Stevenage	St Helier, Jersey
15:00 BST		Report	White; Kemp; List	Stadium: Springfield Stadium

23 July 2024 Friendly	Stevenage	1–3	Coventry City	Stevenage
19:00 BST	Phillips 2'	Report	Obikwu 17' (pen.); Thomas 21'; Tavares 43'	Stadium: Broadhall Way; Attendance: 1,737

2 August 2024 Friendly	Braintree Town	1–2	Stevenage	Braintree
19:00 BST	Effiong 31'	Report	White 28'; Evans 60'	Stadium: Cressing Road

3 August 2024 Friendly	Stevenage	1–0	Chelsea U21	Stevenage
15:00 BST	Freestone 45'	Report		Stadium: Broadhall Way

== Competitions ==
=== League One ===
==== League table ====
Pos	Team	Pld	W	D	L	GF	GA	GD	Pts
12	Barnsley	46	17	10	19	69	73	−4	61
13	Rotherham United	46	16	11	19	54	59	−5	59
14	Stevenage	46	15	12	19	42	50	−8	57
15	Wigan Athletic	46	13	17	16	40	42	−2	56
16	Exeter City	46	15	11	20	49	65	−16	56

Source: EFL Official Website
Rules for classification: 1) Points; 2) Goal difference; 3) Number of goals scored; 4) Head-to-head results; 5) Wins; 6) Away goals; 7) Penalty points (sec 9.5); 8) 12-point sending off offences

==== Results summary ====
Overall								Home						Away					
Pld	W	D	L	GF	GA	GD	Pts	W	D	L	GF	GA	GD	W	D	L	GF	GA	GD
45	15	11	19	41	49	−8	56	9	5	9	28	26	+2	6	6	10	13	23	−10

Last updated: 27 April 2025.
Source: Soccerway

==== Matches ====
On 26 June, the League One fixtures were announced.

Win Draw Loss Fixtures

10 August 2024 1	Stevenage	1–0	Shrewsbury Town	Stevenage
17:30 BST	List 58'; Thompson (yellow card) 65'; Kemp (penalty missed) 73'	Report	Winchester (yellow card) 31'; Pierre (yellow card) 38'; Nsiala (yellow card) 51'; Biggins (yellow card) 78'	Stadium: Broadhall Way; Attendance: 3,357; Referee: Thomas Kirk

17 August 2024 2	Huddersfield Town	2–1	Stevenage	Huddersfield
15:00 BST	Evans (yellow card) 9'; Koroma 26'; Wiles 52'; Headley (yellow card) 74'; Nicholls (yellow card) 84'; Helik (yellow card) 85'	Report	Piergianni (yellow card) 27'; Phillips (yellow card) 40'; White 90+5' (pen.)	Stadium: Kirklees Stadium; Attendance: 18,529; Referee: Andy Davies

24 August 2024 3	Burton Albion	0–0	Stevenage	Burton upon Trent
12:30 BST	Godwin-Malife (yellow card) 34'; Gilligan (yellow card) 67'; Watt (yellow card) 90'	Report	Sweeney (yellow card) 7'; Thompson (yellow card) 34'; Roberts (yellow card) 34'; Simpson (yellow card) 50'; Smith (yellow card) 83'	Stadium: Pirelli Stadium; Attendance: 2,378; Referee: Charles Breakspear
Note: Fixture was initially scheduled for a 15:00 kick-off, but was moved for live Sky Sports coverage.

31 August 2024 4	Stevenage	0–1	Lincoln City	Stevenage
15:00 BST	Smith (yellow card) 48'; Aboh (yellow card) 84'; Piergianni (yellow card) 90+10'	Report	House (yellow card) 32'; Erhahon (yellow card) 44'; O'Connor (yellow card) 66' (yellow-red card) 90+10'; Moylan 72' (pen.); Draper (yellow card) 90'	Stadium: Broadhall Way; Attendance: 4,017; Referee: David Rock

14 September 2024 6	Stevenage	3–0	Barnsley	Stevenage
15:00 BST	List 54', 89'; Piergianni 59'; White (yellow card) 61'; Phillips (yellow card) 78'; Freestone (yellow card) 82'; Thompson (yellow card) 86'	Report	De Gevigney (yellow card) 64'; O'Keeffe (yellow card) 79'	Stadium: Broadhall Way; Attendance: 4,206; Referee: Jacob Miles

21 September 2024 7	Exeter City	2–0	Stevenage	Exeter
12:30 BST	Francis 9'; Doyle 50'; Crama (yellow card) 55'	Report	Roberts (yellow card) 44'; Piergianni (yellow card) 83'	Stadium: St James Park; Attendance: 5,612 (123 away); Referee: Neil Hair
Note: Fixture was initially scheduled for a 15:00 kick-off, but was moved for live Sky Sports coverage.

24 September 2024 5	Wigan Athletic	0–0	Stevenage	Wigan
19:45 BST	McManaman (yellow card) 14'; Smith (yellow card) 58'; Adeeko (yellow card) 87'	Report	Piergianni (yellow card) 17'; L. Thompson (yellow card) 37'; N. Thompson (yellow card) 66'; White (yellow card) 90+3'	Stadium: Brick Community Stadium; Attendance: 7,419; Referee: Ben Toner
Note: Fixture was originally scheduled for 7 September, but was postponed due to international call-ups.

28 September 2024 8	Stevenage	1–0	Charlton Athletic	Stevenage
15:00 GMT	Roberts (yellow card) 34', (goal) 67'; Kemp (yellow card) 36'; White (yellow card) 69'; Phillips (yellow card) 90+2'	Report	Potts (yellow card) 41'; Edwards (yellow card) 51'; Coventry (yellow card) 54'; Berry (yellow card) 90+2'; Jones (yellow card) 90+2'	Stadium: Broadhall Way; Attendance: 4,701; Referee: Scott Tallis

1 October 2024 9	Stevenage	1–0	Wrexham	Stevenage
19:45 GMT	Thompson 10'; Butler (yellow card) 27'; Roberts (yellow card) 88'	Report	O'Connor (yellow card) 39'; Cannon (yellow card) 68'; O'Connell (yellow card) 90+4'	Stadium: Broadhall Way; Attendance: 5,704; Referee: Will Finnie

5 October 2024 10	Peterborough United	2–1	Stevenage	Peterborough
12:30 GMT	O'Brien-Brady 5'; Wallin (yellow card) 68'; Collins (yellow card) 78'; Poku 90+4'; Dornelly (yellow card) 90+6'	Report	Butler (yellow card) 24'; Thompson 64'; Freestone (yellow card) 70'	Stadium: London Road Stadium; Attendance: 8,018; Referee: Alex Chilowicz
Note: Fixture was initially scheduled for a 15:00 kick-off, but was moved for live Sky Sports coverage.

19 October 2024 12	Mansfield Town	0–1	Stevenage	Mansfield
15:00 BST	Cargill (yellow card) 24'; Reed (yellow card) 64'	Report	Young 32'; James-Wildin (yellow card) 66'	Stadium: Field Mill; Attendance: 7,135; Referee: James Durkin

22 October 2024 13	Stevenage	0–2	Cambridge United	Stevenage
19:45 GMT	Piergianni (yellow card) 26'; Thompson (yellow card) 40'	Report	Digby (yellow card) 26'; Smith 31', (yellow card) 45+4'; Kaikai 90'	Stadium: Broadhall Way; Attendance: 4,574; Referee: Ben Atkinson

26 October 2024 14	Rotherham United	2–0	Stevenage	Rotherham
15:00 BST	Odoffin (yellow card) 25'; Tiéhi (yellow card) 45'; Hugill 70'; Wilks 72'; Rafferty (yellow card) 90+1'	Report	Freestone (yellow card) 49'; King (yellow card) 54'; Pressley (yellow card) 90+2'	Stadium: New York Stadium; Attendance: 8,896; Referee: Sunny Singh Gill

29 October 2024 11	Stevenage	1–4	Bolton Wanderers	Stevenage
19:45 BST	Phillips (yellow card) 67'; Kemp 70'; James-Wildin (yellow card) 80'; Butler (yellow card) 84'	Report	Santos 13', (yellow card) 73'; McAtee 16'; Sheehan (yellow card) 31'; Johnston (yellow card) 59'; Adeboyejo 61'; Southwood (yellow card) 78'; Charles 88'	Stadium: Broadhall Way; Attendance: 3,611; Referee: Carl Brook
Note: Fixture was originally scheduled for 12 October, but was postponed due to international call-ups in the Bolton squad.

9 November 2024 15	Stevenage	1–1	Reading	Stevenage
15:00 GMT	Kemp 29' (Freeman)	Report	Elliott (yellow card) 65'; Knibbs 82' (Campbell)	Stadium: Broadhall Way; Attendance: 4,562; Referee: Craig Hicks

23 November 2024 17	Stevenage	0–0	Leyton Orient	Stevenage
12:30 GMT	Roberts (yellow card) 51'; Thompson (yellow card) 89'	Report	Warrington (yellow card) 25'; Pratley (yellow card) 31'; O'Neill (yellow card) 84'	Stadium: Broadhall Way; Attendance: 4,259; Referee: Ben Speedie
Note: Fixture was initially scheduled for a 15:00 kick-off, but was moved for live Sky Sports coverage.

3 December 2024 18	Stevenage	2–0	Northampton Town	Stevenage
19:45 GMT	Piergianni (yellow card) 2'; White (yellow card) 45+3'; Thompson (yellow card) 52'; Kemp 89'; Reid 90+3'	Report	Eaves (yellow card) 2' (yellow-red card) 28'; Odimayo (yellow card) 16'; McGeehan (yellow card) 51'	Stadium: Broadhall Way; Attendance: 2,767; Referee: Scott Jackson

14 December 2024 20	Stevenage	2–1	Stockport County	Stevenage
15:00 GMT	Kemp 22'; Roberts (yellow card) 43'; Thompson (yellow card) 45'; Reid 55' (pen.); Butler (yellow card) 62'	Report	Camps 26', (yellow card) 40'; Bate (yellow card) 60'; Hinchliffe (yellow card) 67'	Stadium: Broadhall Way; Attendance: 3,513; Referee: Alex Chilowicz

21 December 2024 21	Blackpool	0–0	Stevenage	Blackpool
15:00 GMT	Evans (yellow card) 52'; Offiah (yellow card) 64'; Tyrer (yellow card) 84'	Report	Thompson (yellow card) 33'	Stadium: Bloomfield Road; Attendance: 8,610; Referee: Martin Woods

26 December 2024 22	Stevenage	0–3	Wycombe Wanderers	Stevenage
15:00 GMT	Phillips (yellow card) 45'; Kemp (yellow card) 75'; List (yellow card) 77'	Report	Kone 8', 43', (penalty missed) 81'; Lubala 66'	Stadium: Broadhall Way; Attendance: 4,430; Referee: Paul Howard

29 December 2024 23	Stevenage	3–0	Bristol Rovers	Stevenage
15:00 GMT	List 34'; Roberts 54', (yellow card) 71'; Freestone (yellow card) 57'; Reid 88'	Report	Lindsay (yellow card) 22' (yellow-red card) 53'; Wilson (yellow card) 26'; McCormick (yellow card) 65'; Sousa (yellow card) 85'	Stadium: Broadhall Way; Attendance: 3,768; Referee: Edward Duckworth

1 January 2025 24	Northampton Town	0–0	Stevenage	Northampton
15:00 GMT	Hondermarck (yellow card) 14'; Dobson (yellow card) 88'	Report		Stadium: Sixfields Stadium; Attendance: 6,294; Referee: Darren Drysdale

4 January 2025 25	Lincoln City	0–0	Stevenage	Lincoln
15:00 GMT	Montsma (yellow card) 10'; Darikwa (yellow card) 54'	Report	Kemp (yellow card) 84'	Stadium: Sincil Bank; Attendance: 8,220; Referee: Scott Tallis

18 January 2025 27	Stevenage	1–2	Wigan Athletic	Stevenage
15:00 GMT	Piergianni (yellow card) 35'; Thompson (yellow card) 54' (yellow-red card) 90+3'; Kemp 83'	Report	Goodwin (yellow card) 1'; Smith (yellow card) 14'; Sibbick (yellow card) 37'; Taylor 55'; Weir (red card) 73'; Aasgaard 90+5'	Stadium: Broadhall Way; Attendance: 3,580; Referee: Jacob Miles

25 January 2025 28	Barnsley	0–1	Stevenage	Barnsley
15:00 GMT	McCarthy (yellow card) 89'	Report	Phillips (yellow card) 56'; Goode (yellow card) 86'; Kemp 90+2'	Stadium: Oakwell; Attendance: 10,831; Referee: Ross Joyce

28 January 2025 29	Wrexham	2–3	Stevenage	Wrexham
19:45 BST	Rathbone 55' (McClean) (yellow card) 69'; Cleworth 90' (Lee)	Report	Kemp 13'; Reid 18' (Appéré); Young 71' (Kemp); Phillips (yellow card) 89'; Cooper (yellow card) 89'; Reid (yellow card) 90+1'	Stadium: STōK Cae Ras; Attendance: 10,670; Referee: Thomas Kirk

1 February 2025 30	Stevenage	4–1	Exeter City	Stevenage
12:30 GMT	King (yellow card) 2', (goal) 11'; Roberts 17', 80'; Freeman (yellow card) 24'; Reid (yellow card) 44'; Kemp 76'	Report	Magennis 2' (pen.); Diabate (yellow card) 90'	Stadium: Broadhall Way; Attendance: 3,094; Referee: Ollie Yates
Note: Fixture was initially scheduled for a 15:00 kick-off, but was moved for live Sky Sports broadcasting.

8 February 2025 31	Charlton Athletic	2–0	Stevenage	Charlton
12:30 GMT	Godden 44'; Berry 48', (yellow card) 84'	Report	Goode (yellow card) 83'; Freestone (yellow card) 85'	Stadium: The Valley; Attendance: 14,093; Referee: Josh Smith
Note: Fixture was initially scheduled for a 15:00 kick-off, but was moved for live Sky Sports broadcasting.

11 February 2025 19	Crawley Town	3–1	Stevenage	Crawley
19:45 GMT	Ibrahim (yellow card) 14'; Forster 50'; Quitirna 87'; Doyle 90+4'	Report	Piergianni (yellow card) 47'; Hanlan 53'; Phillips (yellow card) 54'; Sweeney (yellow card) 63'; Thompson (yellow card) 89'	Stadium: Broadfield Stadium; Referee: Sam Purkiss
Note: Fixture was originally scheduled for 7 December, but was postponed due to safety concerns from Storm Darragh.

15 February 2025 32	Stevenage	1–1	Peterborough United	Stevenage
15:00 GMT	Freestone (yellow card) 49'; Kemp 55'	Report	Kyprianou (yellow card) 33'; Hayes 67'; Edun (yellow card) 71'	Stadium: Broadhall Way; Attendance: 4,476; Referee: Benjamin Speedie

18 February 2025 26	Stevenage	0–1	Burton Albion	Stevenage
19:45 GMT	Reid (penalty missed) 56'	Report	Webster 45'; Vancooten (red card) 57'; Dodgson (yellow card) 79'; Crocombe (yellow card) 90'; Godwin-Malife (yellow card) 90+2'	Stadium: Broadhall Way; Attendance: 2,801; Referee: James Durkin
Note: Fixture was originally scheduled for 11 January, but was postponed due to a frozen pitch.

22 February 2025 33	Shrewsbury Town	0–1	Stevenage	Shrewsbury
15:00 GMT		Report	Pierre 8' (o.g.)	Stadium: New Meadow; Attendance: 5,694; Referee: Michael Barlow

1 March 2025 34	Stevenage	1–2	Huddersfield Town	Stevenage
15:00 GMT	Hanlan 11'	Report	Marshall 3'; Lonwijk 24', (yellow card) 66'; Evans (yellow card) 33'; Hogg (yellow card) 71'	Stadium: Broadhall Way; Attendance: 4,373; Referee: James Linington

4 March 2025 35	Cambridge United	0–1	Stevenage	Cambridge
19:45 GMT	Loft (yellow card) 41'; Stevenson (yellow card) 89'	Report	Sweeney (yellow card) 8'; Reid 64'; Phillips (yellow card) 83'	Stadium: Abbey Stadium; Attendance: 6,338; Referee: Scott Jackson

8 March 2025 36	Stevenage	1–1	Mansfield Town	Stevenage
15:00 GMT	Reid 44'; Roberts (yellow card) 65'	Report	Vickers (yellow card) 61'; Cargill (yellow card) 71'; Rhodes 81'; Lewis (yellow card) 88'	Stadium: Broadhall Way; Attendance: 3,675; Referee: Greg Rollason

11 March 2025 16	Birmingham City	2–1	Stevenage	Bordesley
19:45 GMT	Dowell 27' (pen.); Paik Seung-ho 47'; Iwata (yellow card) 61'; Stansfield (yellow card) 64'; Allsop (yellow card) 90'; Cochrane (yellow card) 90'	Report	Phillips (yellow card) 90'; Young 90+4'	Stadium: St Andrew's; Attendance: 25,544; Referee: Alan Young
Note: Fixture was originally scheduled for 16 November, but was postponed due to international call-ups in the Birmingham squad.

15 March 2025 37	Reading	1–1	Stevenage	Reading
15:00 GMT	Piergianni 49' (o.g.); Wing (yellow card) 59'; Savage (yellow card) 78'	Report	Piergianni 60'	Stadium: Madejski Stadium; Attendance: 13,984; Referee: Lee Swabey

27 March 2025 39	Leyton Orient	1–0	Stevenage	Leyton
20:00 GMT	Kelman 12'	Report		Stadium: Brisbane Road; Attendance: 7,305; Referee: Will Finnie
Note: Fixture was initially scheduled for 29 March, but was moved for live Sky Sports broadcasting.

1 April 2025 40	Stockport County	3–0	Stevenage	Edgeley
19:45 BST		Report		Stadium: Edgeley Park

5 April 2025 41	Stevenage	3–1	Crawley Town	Stevenage
15:00 BST	White 20'; Goode (yellow card) 50'; Reid 89'; Kemp 90+1'	Report	Ibrahim 70', (yellow card) 85'	Stadium: Broadhall Way; Attendance: 4,403; Referee: Scott Oldham

12 April 2025 42	Wycombe Wanderers	1–0	Stevenage	High Wycombe
12:30 BST	Taylor 90+1'	Report	Phillips (yellow card) 41'	Stadium: Adams Park; Attendance: 4,827; Referee: Josh Smith
Note: Fixture was initially scheduled for a 15:00 kick-off, but was moved for live Sky Sports broadcasting.

18 April 2025 43	Stevenage	1–3	Blackpool	Stevenage
15:00 BST	Kemp (yellow card) 36'; Butler (yellow card) 51'; Piergianni 77'; Freestone (yellow card) 79'	Report	Apter 56', 63', 68'; Baggott (yellow card) 75'; Casey (yellow card) 79'	Stadium: Broadhall Way; Attendance: 4,161; Referee: Simon Mather

21 April 2025 44	Bristol Rovers	0–1	Stevenage	Horfield
15:00 BST	Moore (yellow card) 45+2'	Report	Reid 12'; White (yellow card) 36'; List (yellow card) 49'; Thompson (yellow card) 53'	Stadium: Memorial Stadium; Attendance: 9,192; Referee: Leigh Doughty

24 April 2025 38	Stevenage	0–1	Birmingham City	Stevenage
19:45 BST	Phillips (yellow card) 24'; James-Wildin (yellow card) 52'	Report	Cochrane 75'; Dowell (yellow card) 84'	Stadium: Broadhall Way; Attendance: 4,135; Referee: Lee Swabey
Note: Fixture was initially scheduled for 22 March, but was re-arranged due to international call-ups in the Birmingham squad.

27 April 2025 45	Stevenage	1–1	Rotherham United	Stevenage
14:00 BST	Piergianni (yellow card) 86'; Sweeney 90+2'	Report	Nombe 8'; Rafferty (yellow card) 30'; Kelly (yellow card) 35'	Stadium: Broadhall Way; Attendance: 4,092; Referee: Andy Davies
Note: Fixture was initially scheduled for 26 April, but was re-arranged due to having a fixture on the preceding Thursday.

3 May 2025 46	Bolton Wanderers	1–1	Stevenage	Horwich
15:00 BST	Dacres-Cogley 66'	Report	Young 76'; Piergianni (yellow card) 82'	Stadium: Toughsheet Community Stadium; Attendance: 20,613; Referee: Darren Drysdale

=== FA Cup ===
Stevenage were drawn at home to Guiseley in the first round and then to Mansfield Town in the second round.

Win Draw Loss Fixtures

2 November 2024 First round	Stevenage	1–1 (a.e.t.) (5–4 p)	Guiseley	Stevenage
15:00 GMT	Reid 53'; Kemp (yellow card) 78'; Young (yellow card) 90+3'; List (yellow card) 107'	Report	Longbottom (yellow card) 45+2', (goal) 83'; Moke (yellow card) 55'; Ludufu (yellow card) 99'	Stadium: Broadhall Way; Attendance: 2,224; Referee: Oliver Mackey
	Penalties
	Reid (penalty scored); Roberts (penalty missed); White (penalty missed); Young (penalty scored); List (penalty scored); Smith (penalty scored); Kemp (penalty scored)		(penalty scored) Longbottom; (penalty missed) Brown; (penalty scored) Ackroyd; (penalty scored) Ridehalgh; (penalty missed) Mbeka; (penalty scored) Bentley; (penalty missed) Ible

30 November 2024 Second round	Stevenage	0–1	Mansfield Town	Stevenage
15:00 GMT	Thompson (yellow card) 45+1'; James-Wildin (yellow card) 59'	Report	Baccus (yellow card) 33'; McLaughlin 48'	Stadium: Broadhall Way; Attendance: 2,464; Referee: Tom Reeves

=== EFL Cup ===
On 27 June, the draw for the first round was made, with Stevenage being drawn away against Norwich City.

Win Draw Loss Fixtures

13 August 2024 First round	Norwich City	4–3	Stevenage	Norwich
19:45 BST	Long (yellow card) 25'; Kamara 26'; Hernández 35', 60'; Sainz 48'; Forsyth (yellow card) 75'	Report	White (yellow card) 18'; Goode 28'; Appéré 45+1'; Hills 88' (o.g.)	Stadium: Carrow Road; Attendance: 13,054; Referee: Sunny Singh Gill

=== EFL Trophy ===
In the group stage, Stevenage were drawn into Southern Group D alongside Gillingham, Peterborough United and Crystal Palace U21. They were then drawn away to Burton Albion in the round of 32, Leyton Orient in the round of 16 and at home to Birmingham City in the quarter-finals.

==== Group stage ====
Pos	Div	Team	Pld	W	PW	PL	L	GF	GA	GD	Pts	Qualification
1	L1	Peterborough United	3	3	0	0	0	8	2	+6	9	Advance to Round 2
2	L1	Stevenage	3	1	0	1	1	2	3	−1	4	Advance to Round 2
3	ACA	Crystal Palace U21	3	1	0	0	2	4	6	−2	3	
4	L2	Gillingham	3	0	1	0	2	3	6	−3	2	

Source: EFL

Win Draw Loss Fixtures

20 August 2024 Group stage	Stevenage	1–0	Crystal Palace U21	Stevenage
19:00 BST	Simpson 32'; Goode (yellow card) 64'	Report		Stadium: Broadhall Way; Attendance: 903; Referee: Abigail Byrne

8 October 2024 Group stage	Peterborough United	2–0	Stevenage	Peterborough
19:00 BST	Mothersille 12'; O'Brien-Brady (yellow card) 25'; Nevett (yellow card) 34'; Sparkes 43'	Report	Aboh (yellow card) 40'	Stadium: London Road Stadium; Attendance: 2,281; Referee: Stephen Parkinson

12 November 2024 Group stage	Stevenage	1–1	Gillingham	Stevenage
19:00 GMT	White (yellow card) 60'; Kemp 68'; King (yellow card) 86'	Report	Andrews 26'; Gbode (yellow card) 48'	Stadium: Broadhall Way; Attendance: 832; Referee: Scott Simpson
	Penalties
	Simpson (penalty missed); Aboh (penalty scored); Kemp (penalty scored); White (penalty scored); King (penalty scored)		(penalty scored) Clark; (penalty scored) Williams; (penalty scored) Nolan; (penalty scored) Sargent; (penalty scored) Wyllie

==== Knockout stages ====
10 December 2024 Round of 32	Burton Albion	0–4	Stevenage	Burton upon Trent
19:00 GMT	Bran (yellow card) 2'; Williams (yellow card) 20'; Gilligan (yellow card) 72'; Whitfield (yellow card) 74'	Report	Freestone 6'; Simpson 54'; Piergianni (yellow card) 62'; Aboh 78'; White 83'	Stadium: Pirelli Stadium; Attendance: 321; Referee: Richard Eley

21 January 2025 Round of 16	Leyton Orient	0–1	Stevenage	Leyton
19:00 GMT	Clare (yellow card) 53'	Report	Cooper 25' (o.g.); Appéré (yellow card) 63'; King (yellow card) 72'; Sweeney (yellow card) 90+11'	Stadium: Gaughan Group Stadium; Referee: Carl Brook
Note: Fixture was initially scheduled for 14 January, but was pushed back a week due to the FA Cup rearrangement versus Derby County.

4 February 2025 Quarter-finals	Stevenage	0–1	Birmingham City	Stevenage
19:45 GMT	Thompson (yellow card) 59'; Piergianni (yellow card) 79'	Report	Iwata (yellow card) 78'; Stansfield 83', (yellow card) 83'	Stadium: The Lamex Stadium; Attendance: 2,812; Referee: Declan Bourne

== Statistics ==
=== Appearances and goals ===
As of match played 27 April 2025

Players with no appearances are not included on the list
Italics indicate a loaned in player

No.	Pos	Nat	Player	Total		League One		FA Cup		EFL Cup		EFL Trophy	
No.	Pos	Nat	Player	Apps	Goals	Apps	Goals	Apps	Goals	Apps	Goals	Apps	Goals
1	GK	(England) ENG	Taye Ashby-Hammond	13	0	8+0	0	0+0	0	0+0	0	5+0	0
2	DF	(Antigua and Barbuda) ANT	Luther James-Wildin	32	0	28+0	0	1+0	0	0+0	0	1+2	0
3	DF	(England) ENG	Dan Butler	37	0	27+4	0	2+0	0	1+0	0	3+0	0
5	DF	(England) ENG	Carl Piergianni	48	3	43+0	3	1+0	0	1+0	0	2+1	0
6	DF	(England) ENG	Dan Sweeney	23	1	13+7	1	0+0	0	0+1	0	2+0	0
7	MF	(England) ENG	Nick Freeman	37	0	13+16	0	1+1	0	1+0	0	5+0	0
8	MF	(England) ENG	Jake Forster-Caskey	3	0	1+2	0	0+0	0	0+0	0	0+0	0
9	FW	(Scotland) SCO	Louis Appéré	19	1	6+10	0	0+0	0	1+0	1	1+1	0
10	MF	(England) ENG	Dan Kemp	48	11	33+7	10	2+0	0	1+0	0	5+0	1
11	MF	(England) ENG	Jordan Roberts	47	4	37+4	4	2+0	0	1+0	0	2+1	0
12	FW	(England) ENG	Tyreece Simpson	25	2	7+12	0	0+1	0	0+1	0	4+0	2
13	GK	(England) ENG	Murphy Cooper	40	0	37+0	0	2+0	0	1+0	0	0+0	0
14	DF	(England) ENG	Kane Smith	22	0	13+1	0	1+1	0	1+0	0	5+0	0
15	DF	(England) ENG	Charlie Goode	23	1	16+4	0	0+0	0	1+0	1	2+0	0
16	DF	(England) ENG	Lewis Freestone	34	1	20+6	0	1+0	0	0+1	0	6+0	1
17	FW	(England) ENG	Elliott List	43	4	15+23	4	1+1	0	0+0	0	3+0	0
18	MF	(England) ENG	Harvey White	49	3	22+18	2	2+0	0	1+0	0	5+1	1
19	FW	(Northern Ireland) NIR	Jamie Reid	44	9	34+7	8	1+0	1	0+0	0	0+2	0
20	FW	(Scotland) SCO	Aaron Pressley	7	0	0+4	0	1+0	0	0+0	0	1+1	0
22	MF	(Trinidad and Tobago) TTO	Daniel Phillips	45	0	30+11	0	0+0	0	0+1	0	1+2	0
23	MF	(Wales) WAL	Louis Thompson	44	2	34+6	2	1+0	0	0+0	0	2+1	0
25	GK	(Australia) AUS	Dean Bouzanis	1	0	0+0	0	0+0	0	0+0	0	1+0	0
26	MF	(Wales) WAL	Eli King	32	1	16+11	1	1+1	0	0+0	0	2+1	0
27	FW	(England) ENG	Brandon Hanlan	16	2	12+4	2	0+0	0	0+0	0	0+0	0
29	FW	(England) ENG	Kyle Edwards	8	0	5+3	0	0+0	0	0+0	0	0+0	0
30	FW	(England) ENG	Jake Young	35	3	11+17	3	1+1	0	0+0	0	5+0	0
35	FW	(England) ENG	Makise Evans	2	0	0+0	0	0+0	0	0+0	0	0+2	0
37	MF	(England) ENG	Ryan Doherty	3	0	0+0	0	0+0	0	0+0	0	1+2	0
40	FW	(England) ENG	Lenny Brown	2	0	0+0	0	0+0	0	0+0	0	0+2	0
Player(s) who featured whilst on loan but returned to parent club during the season:
27	FW	(England) ENG	Ken Aboh	7	1	0+3	0	0+1	0	0+0	0	2+1	1
Player(s) who featured but departed the club permanently during the season:
4	DF	(England) ENG	Nathan Thompson	20	0	14+1	0	1+0	0	1+0	0	2+1	0
24	MF	(England) ENG	Ben Thompson	3	0	0+1	0	0+0	0	0+1	0	1+0	0
