= Carl Piergianni =

English footballer (born 1992)

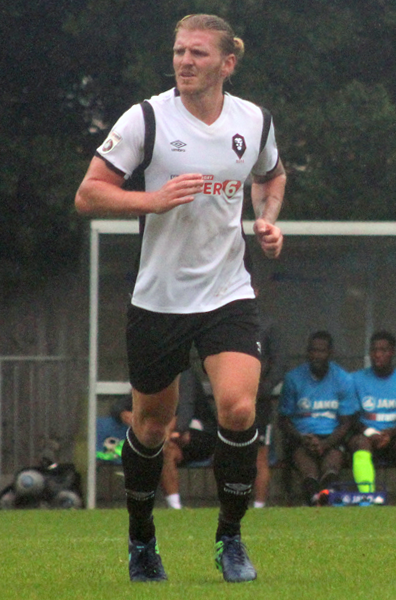
- Piergianni playing for Salford City in 2017

Personal information
- Full name: Carl Liam Piergianni
- Date of birth: 3 May 1992 (age 34)
- Place of birth: Peterborough, England
- Height: 6 ft 1 in (1.85 m)
- Position: Centre-back

Team information
- Current team: Stevenage
- Number: 5

Youth career
- 2007–2009: Peterborough United

Senior career*
Years	Team	Apps	(Gls)
2009–2011	Peterborough United	1	(0)
2009–2010	→ Spalding United (loan)	6	(0)
2011	→ Altrincham (loan)	21	(0)
2011–2012	Stockport County	44	(4)
2012–2013	Corby Town	28	(6)
2013–2016	Boston United	118	(16)
2017	South Melbourne	10	(0)
2017–2020	Salford City	98	(12)
2020	→ Oldham Athletic (loan)	11	(0)
2020–2022	Oldham Athletic	78	(7)
2022–	Stevenage	181	(17)
- * Club domestic league appearances and goals as of 17:35, 13 September 2026 (UTC)

Carl Liam Piergianni (born 3 May 1992) is an English professional footballer who serves as captain and plays as a centre-back for EFL League One club Stevenage.

Piergianni began his career in the youth academy at Peterborough United, signing professional terms in May 2010 after a work experience loan at Spalding United. He made a single first-team appearance for Peterborough before leaving at the end of the 2010–11 season. He joined Stockport County in August 2011, spending one season there before moving to Corby Town for the 2012–13 season, and then signing for Boston United in May 2013. Across three years at Boston, he made 136 appearances, won consecutive Player of the Year awards, and was named twice in the National League North Team of the Year.

Following a brief spell in Australia with South Melbourne, he returned to England to sign for Salford City in May 2017, helping the club achieve back-to-back promotions into the Football League, scoring in the 2019 National League play-off final. In January 2020, Piergianni joined Oldham Athletic on loan, which was made permanent in August 2020. He captained Oldham for two years before signing for Stevenage in May 2022, where he was appointed club captain. In his first season, Stevenage earned promotion to League One, and Piergianni was named in the EFL League Two Team of the Season.

== Early life ==
Piergianni was born in Peterborough, Cambridgeshire, where he attended Stanground College. He is of Italian descent through his father, Franco, who played at youth and reserve level for Peterborough United but did not progress to the professional game. The middle of three brothers, he grew up supporting Chelsea and aspired to model his playing style on John Terry.

== Career ==
=== Peterborough United ===
Piergianni was playing in the Peterborough and District Youth League when he was scouted by Peterborough United. He joined the club's youth system in 2007 and was named as their under-18 Player of the Year during his time in the academy. Whilst still playing for the club's under-18 team, Piergianni joined Spalding United on a work experience loan, where he made six first-team appearances in the Northern Premier League Division One South. He signed his first professional contract with Peterborough in May 2010, a one-year development agreement.

Piergianni made his Football League debut as a 95th-minute substitute in a 2–1 victory against Rochdale on 10 December 2010. He joined Conference Premier club Altrincham on a work experience loan on 31 December 2010. He made his debut for the club the next day, playing the full match in a 0–0 draw with Wrexham. Piergianni made 21 appearances during the 2010–11 season at Altrincham, leaving upon the conclusion of his loan at the end of the season. He was released by Peterborough in June 2011.

=== Stockport County ===
Piergianni signed for Conference Premier club Stockport County on a free transfer on 10 August 2011. He scored his first goals in senior football in a 3–3 draw with Hayes & Yeading on 5 November 2011, scoring twice to give Stockport a 3–1 lead in the match. He made 44 appearances in all competitions during the 2011–12 season, his first full season of regular first-team football, scoring four goals as Stockport finished the season in 16th position in the Conference Premier.

Stockport offered Piergianni a new contract in May 2012, but the two parties were unable to agree terms. Despite this, he played in three matches in the opening month of the 2012–13 season. He left Stockport at the end of August 2012, with Director of Football Jim Gannon stating the club were no longer in a position financially to offer the defender a new contract.

=== Corby Town ===
After leaving Stockport, Piergianni joined Conference North club Corby Town on a non-contract basis on 10 October 2012. He debuted for Corby in the club's 5–2 home defeat to Altrincham on 13 October 2012, scoring a consolation goal in the second half of the match. He was made club captain within a month of his arrival and made 30 appearances during the 2012–13 season, scoring seven goals.

=== Boston United ===
Piergianni joined fellow Conference North club Boston United on 17 May 2013, becoming the club's third acquisition ahead of the new season. He made his Boston debut in a 4–1 victory against former employers Stockport County at Edgeley Park on 17 August 2013. The defender played 47 times and scored five goals in all competitions during the 2013–14 season. He was voted Boston's Players' Player of the Year at the club's end-of-season awards ceremony, in a season that saw the club finish in sixth place in the Conference North league table. He was also named in the Conference North Team of the Year that season. Piergianni signed a new two-year contract in May 2014.

Boston reached the Conference North play-offs during the 2014–15 season, where they lost to Chorley at the semi-final stage, with Piergianni making 46 appearances in all competitions that season. He was named the club's Player of the Year in May 2015. He scored nine goals from central defence during the 2015–16 season as Boston once again qualified for the play-offs after finishing fifth in the league. They were defeated in the semi-final by North Ferriby United, losing 3–2 on aggregate. At the end of the season, Piergianni was named in the National League North Team of the Year. During his three years at Boston, he made 136 appearances and scored 19 goals.

=== South Melbourne ===
Having opted to leave Boston at the end of the season, in order to travel to Australia, Piergianni signed for South Melbourne of the National Premier Leagues, Australia's second division, on 12 January 2017. He made his debut for South Melbourne in the 2017 Community Shield, which they lost 2–1 to Bentleigh Greens. He made 13 appearances for the club, 10 of which were in the league, before leaving during the mid-season transfer window in May 2017.

=== Salford City ===
Piergianni returned to England and signed a two-year contract with National League North club Salford City on 19 May 2017. He made his debut in the club's first game of the 2017–18 season, a 2–0 home defeat to Darlington. He made 39 appearances and scored three goals as Salford earned promotion to the National League after finishing the season as National League North champions. He was voted the club's Player of the Year in April 2018 and was also named in the National League North Team of the Year that season.

Piergianni signed a contract extension on 17 December 2018, with the new agreement running until 2021. He played 53 times during the 2018–19 season as Salford earned back-to-back promotions into the Football League after winning the 2019 National League play-off final, a 3–0 victory against AFC Fylde at Wembley Stadium on 11 May 2019. He scored Salford's second goal in the match: a header from a corner kick in the second half. The goal was his 11th of the season from central defence. He was named in the National League Team of the Year for the 2018–19 season. Despite playing regularly during the opening two months of the 2019–20 season in League Two, Piergianni was limited to two substitute appearances over two months following back-to-back defeats in September 2019.

=== Oldham Athletic ===
Wanting to play first-team football, Piergianni joined fellow League Two club Oldham Athletic on 6 January 2020, on a loan agreement until the end of the 2019–20 season. Oldham manager Dino Maamria highlighted the centre-back's leadership skills and character when the signing was announced. He made 11 appearances during the loan spell before the League Two regular season was curtailed due to the COVID-19 pandemic in March 2020. Piergianni signed for Oldham on a permanent basis on 2 August 2020, agreeing a two-year contract. He scored five times in 45 appearances during the 2020–21 season as Oldham finished 18th in League Two. In April 2021, he won the PFA Community Champion award for the 2020–21 season for his work with the Oldham Athletic Community Trust (OACT) throughout the year.

Piergianni was named club captain during the 2021–22 season. He played 48 times during the season, scoring four goals, as Oldham were relegated to the National League. He won the PFA Community Champion award for the second consecutive season in recognition of his continued work with the OACT. With his contract set to expire, Piergianni was released by Oldham at the end of the season.

=== Stevenage ===
Piergianni signed for League Two club Stevenage on a free transfer on 23 May 2022. He made his debut in a 2–1 away victory over Tranmere Rovers on 30 July 2022 and scored his first goal in a 1–0 win against Rochdale on 16 August 2022. He made 55 appearances in all competitions during his first season, scoring eight goals from central defence, as Stevenage secured promotion to League One with a second-place finish. At the 2023 EFL Awards, he was named in the League Two Team of the Season, and was also voted Stevenage Player of the Year at the club's end-of-season awards.

He was included in the club's retained list for the 2023–24 season, signing a new contract on 5 June 2023. Piergianni made 50 appearances that season, scoring four goals, while leading the league in aerial duels won (380) and recording the second-highest number of interceptions (68). He was named Stevenage Player of the Year for the second successive season on 30 April 2024. Piergianni agreed an extended contract on 15 June 2024, and went on to make 49 appearances, scoring three goals, during the 2024–25 season. He signed a further contract extension on 15 August 2025, with the duration undisclosed.

== Style of play ==
Deployed as a centre-back, Piergianni has been described as a "commanding defender". His ability to win aerial duels has been described as one of his main strengths, as well as blocking attacking shots and clearing the ball out of defence. An aerial threat from set-pieces, Piergianni has scored the majority of his goals from attacking free kicks and corner kicks. Having been appointed club captain at Corby Town, Oldham and Stevenage, his leadership skills have also been highlighted as a strength.

== Career statistics ==
As of match played 10 September 2026

Appearances and goals by club, season and competition
Club	Season	League			National Cup (Note: Includes FA Cup, FFA Cup)		League Cup (Note: Includes EFL Cup)		Other		Total	
Club	Season	Division	Apps	Goals	Apps	Goals	Apps	Goals	Apps	Goals	Apps	Goals
Peterborough United	2009–10	Championship	0	0	0	0	0	0	—		0	0
Peterborough United	2010–11	League One	1	0	0	0	0	0	0	0	1	0
Peterborough United	Total		1	0	0	0	0	0	0	0	1	0
Spalding United (loan)	2009–10	NPL Division One South	6	0	0	0	—		0	0	6	0
Altrincham (loan)	2010–11	Conference Premier	21	0	0	0	—		0	0	21	0
Stockport County	2011–12	Conference Premier	41	4	1	0	—		2 (Note: Appearance(s) in FA Trophy)	0	44	4
Stockport County	2012–13	Conference Premier	3	0	0	0	—		0	0	3	0
Stockport County	Total		44	4	1	0	—		2	0	47	4
Corby Town	2012–13	Conference North	28	6	1	0	—		1	1	30	7
Boston United	2013–14	Conference North	41	3	2	0	—		4 (Note: Three appearances and two goals in FA Trophy; one appearance in Lincolnshire Senior Cup)	2	47	5
Boston United	2014–15	Conference North	39	4	1	0	—		6 (Note: Three appearances in FA Trophy; two appearances in 2015 Conference North play-offs; one appearance and one goal in Lincolnshire Senior Cup)	1	46	5
Boston United	2015–16	National League North	38	9	1	0	—		4 (Note: One appearance in FA Trophy; two appearances in 2016 National League North play-offs; one appearance in Lincolnshire Senior Cup)	0	43	9
Boston United	Total		118	16	4	0	—		14	3	136	19
South Melbourne	2017	National Premier Leagues	10	0	2	0	—		1 (Note: Appearance in FV Community Shield)	0	13	0
Salford City	2017–18	National League North	39	3	0	0	—		0	0	39	3
Salford City	2018–19	National League	46	9	3	0	—		4 (Note: Two appearances in FA Trophy; two appearances and two goals in 2019 National League play-offs)	2	53	11
Salford City	2019–20	League Two	13	0	1	0	1	0	2 (Note: Appearance(s) in EFL Trophy)	0	17	0
Salford City	Total		98	12	4	0	1	0	6	2	109	14
Oldham Athletic (loan)	2019–20	League Two	11	0	0	0	0	0	0	0	11	0
Oldham Athletic	2020–21	League Two	38	5	2	0	2	0	3	0	45	5
Oldham Athletic	2021–22	League Two	40	2	2	0	3	0	3	1	48	3
Oldham Athletic	Total		78	7	4	0	5	0	6	1	93	8
Stevenage	2022–23	League Two	46	7	4	0	2	0	3	1	55	8
Stevenage	2023–24	League One	43	4	4	0	1	0	2	0	50	4
Stevenage	2024–25	League One	44	3	1	0	1	0	3	0	49	3
Stevenage	2025–26	League One	42	3	1	0	0	0	3 (Note: One appearance and one goal in EFL Trophy; two appearances in 2026 League One play-offs)	1	46	4
Stevenage	2026–27	League One	6	0	0	0	2	0	0	0	8	0
Stevenage	Total		181	17	10	0	6	0	11	2	208	19
Career total			596	62	26	0	12	0	41	9	675	71

== Honours ==
Salford City

- National League North: 2017–18
- National League play-offs: 2019

Stevenage

- EFL League Two runner-up: 2022–23

Individual

- EFL League Two Team of the Season: 2022–23
- PFA Team of the Year: 2022–23 League Two, 2025–26 League One
- National League Team of the Year: 2018–19
- National League North Team of the Year: 2014–15, 2015–16, 2017–18
- Boston United Player of the Year: 2013–14, 2014–15
- Salford City Player of the Year: 2018–19
- Stevenage Player of the Year: 2022–23, 2023–24
