= Dan Kemp (footballer) =

English footballer (born 1999)

Personal information
- Full name: Daniel Harry Kemp
- Date of birth: 11 January 1999 (age 27)
- Place of birth: Sidcup, England
- Height: 1.68 m (5 ft 6 in)
- Position: Midfielder

Team information
- Current team: Stevenage
- Number: 10

Youth career
- 2005–2015: Chelsea
- 2015–2019: West Ham United

Senior career*
Years	Team	Apps	(Gls)
2019–2021	West Ham United	0	(0)
2020	→ Stevenage (loan)	6	(1)
2020–2021	→ Blackpool (loan)	8	(0)
2021–2022	Leyton Orient	43	(5)
2022–2024	Milton Keynes Dons	31	(3)
2023	→ Hartlepool United (loan)	16	(9)
2023–2024	→ Swindon Town (loan)	25	(14)
2024–	Stevenage	94	(20)

International career^{‡}
2017	England U19	2	(0)
2017	England U20	3	(0)
- * Club domestic league appearances and goals as of 20:11, 25 October 2026 (UTC) ‡ National team caps and goals as of 16:30, 31 January 2020 (UTC)

Daniel Harry Kemp (born 11 January 1999) is an English professional footballer who plays as a midfielder for EFL League One club Stevenage.

== Club career ==
=== Early career ===
Kemp joined the academy of Chelsea at the age of six, and spent ten years with the club before his move across London to West Ham United in 2015.

=== West Ham United ===
Having progressed through to West Ham's U23 development squad, in which he featured in several EFL Trophy ties, Kemp moved on loan to League Two club Stevenage in January 2020, followed by League One club Blackpool on a season-long loan deal in September 2020. He scored his first goal for Blackpool in an EFL Trophy tie against Leeds United U21s on 11 November 2020.

=== Leyton Orient ===
Kemp was recalled from his loan by West Ham on 15 January 2021, and moved to Leyton Orient on a permanent basis on a two-and-a-half-year contract.

=== Milton Keynes Dons ===
On 31 January 2022, Kemp joined League One club Milton Keynes Dons on a permanent deal for an undisclosed fee. He made his debut on 5 February 2022 as an 88th-minute substitute in a 2–1 home win over Lincoln City.

On 31 January 2023, Kemp returned to League Two when he joined Hartlepool United on loan until the end of the season. Kemp said he saw the loan move as a 'massive opportunity' for him. After scoring five times in six games, Kemp won the EFL League Two Player of the Month award for February 2023. On 7 April 2023, Kemp scored his first career hat-trick in a 4–1 win against Grimsby Town.

On 18 July 2023, Kemp joined League Two club Swindon Town on loan for the duration of the 2023–24 season. Over 25 league games during the first half of the season, Kemp scored 14 goals and provided 8 assists - the second most goal contributions of any player in League Two. On 1 January 2024, he was recalled by MK Dons. Despite being recalled in January, Kemp would still win Swindon's Player of the Season award.

At the end of the 2023–24 season, Kemp was released by MK Dons.

=== Stevenage ===
On 10 June 2024, Kemp agreed to return to League One club Stevenage on a permanent two-year contract.

== International career ==
Kemp was capped by England at under-19 and under-20 levels.

== Career statistics ==
As of match played 24 October 2026

Club	Season	League			FA Cup		EFL Cup		Other		Total	
Club	Season	Division	Apps	Goals	Apps	Goals	Apps	Goals	Apps	Goals	Apps	Goals
West Ham United U21	2016–17	—			—		—		2 (Note: Appearance(s) in EFL Trophy)	0	2	0
West Ham United U21	2017–18	—			—		—		2	1	2	1
West Ham United U21	2018–19	—			—		—		1	0	1	0
West Ham United U21	2019–20	—			—		—		3	2	3	2
West Ham United U21	Total		—		—		—		8	3	8	3
West Ham United	2019–20	Premier League	0	0	0	0	0	0	—		0	0
West Ham United	2020–21	Premier League	0	0	0	0	0	0	—		0	0
West Ham United	Total		0	0	0	0	0	0	0	0	0	0
Stevenage (loan)	2019–20	League Two	6	1	0	0	0	0	0	0	6	1
Blackpool (loan)	2020–21	League One	8	0	3	1	0	0	4	1	15	2
Leyton Orient	2020–21	League Two	24	5	0	0	0	0	0	0	24	5
Leyton Orient	2021–22	League Two	19	0	2	0	1	0	3	1	25	1
Leyton Orient	Total		43	5	2	0	1	0	3	1	49	6
Milton Keynes Dons	2021–22	League One	5	0	0	0	0	0	1 (Note: Appearance in League One play-offs)	0	6	0
Milton Keynes Dons	2022–23	League One	5	0	0	0	2	0	3	0	10	0
Milton Keynes Dons	2023–24	League Two	21	3	0	0	0	0	0	0	21	3
Milton Keynes Dons	Total		31	3	0	0	2	0	4	0	37	3
Hartlepool United (loan)	2022–23	League Two	16	9	0	0	0	0	0	0	16	9
Swindon Town (loan)	2023–24	League Two	25	14	1	2	1	0	0	0	27	16
Stevenage	2024–25	League One	40	10	2	0	1	0	5	1	48	11
Stevenage	2025–26	League One	43	7	1	0	1	0	4 (Note: Two appearances in EFL Trophy; two appearances in League One play-offs)	0	48	7
Stevenage	2026–27	League One	11	3	0	0	2	1	2	0	15	4
Stevenage	Total		94	20	3	0	4	1	11	1	112	22
Career total			224	52	9	3	8	1	30	6	270	62

== Honours ==
Individual

- EFL League Two Player of the Month: February 2023
- Swindon Town Player of the Season: 2023–24
- Stevenage Player of the Season: 2024–25
