= Theo Alexandrou =

English footballer (born 2005)

Personal information
- Full name: Theo Andreas Alexandrou
- Date of birth: 23 January 2005 (age 21)
- Height: 1.66 m (5 ft 5 in)
- Position: Forward

Team information
- Current team: St Ives Town

Youth career
- Stevenage

Senior career*
Years	Team	Apps	(Gls)
2023–2024	Stevenage	0	(0)
2023	→ Cambridge City (loan)	4	(1)
2023	→ Potters Bar Town (loan)	7	(1)
2023	→ Cheshunt (loan)	6	(0)
2024	→ St Ives Town (loan)	16	(6)
2024	St Ives Town	7	(1)
2024–2025	Dorking Wanderers	11	(2)
2024–2025	→ Welling United (loan)	8	(0)
2025	→ Wingate & Finchley (loan)	14	(3)
2025–	St Ives Town	0	(0)
- * Club domestic league appearances and goals as of 12:49, 22 June 2025 (UTC)

Theo Andreas Alexandrou (born 23 January 2005) is an English professional footballer who plays as a forward for Northern Premier League Division One Midlands club St Ives Town.

== Career ==
Alexandrou came through the academy at Stevenage. On 15 February 2023, he joined Northern Premier League Midlands Division club Cambridge City on a one-month loan. He turned professional at Stevenage in May 2023. On 2 October 2023, he joined Isthmian League Premier Division side Cheshunt on one-month loan.

On 8 May 2024, the club announced he would be released in the summer once his contract expired.

On 13 June 2024, Alexandrou was announced to be permanently returning to Southern League Premier Division Central club St Ives Town following a short loan spell the previous season.

On 11 September 2024, he signed for National League South side Dorking Wanderers. In December 2024, he joined fellow National League South side Welling United on loan until 31 January 2025. On 7 February 2025, Alexandrou joined Isthmian League side, Wingate & Finchley on an initial one-month loan deal following a brief spell at Welling. On 14 May 2025, it was announced that Alexandrou would leave the club at the end of his contract in June.

In June 2025, Alexandrou returned to St Ives Town for a third separate spell.

== Career statistics ==
As of match played 26 April 2025

Appearances and goals by club, season and competition
Club	Season	League			FA Cup		EFL Cup		Other		Total	
Club	Season	Division	Apps	Goals	Apps	Goals	Apps	Goals	Apps	Goals	Apps	Goals
Stevenage	2022–23	EFL League Two	0	0	0	0	0	0	0	0	0	0
Stevenage	2023–24	EFL League One	0	0	0	0	1	0	1 (Note: Appearance/s in the EFL Trophy)	0	2	0
Stevenage	Total		0	0	0	0	1	0	1	0	2	0
Cambridge City (loan)	2022–23	Northern Premier League; Midlands Division	4	1	0	0	0	0	1 (Note: Appearance/s in the Cambridgeshire Invitation Cup)	1	5	1
Potters Bar Town (loan)	2023–24	Isthmian League; Premier Division	7	1	0	0	0	0	1 (Note: Appearance/s in the Alan Turvey Trophy)	0	8	1
Cheshunt (loan)	2023–24	Isthmian League; Premier Division	6	0	0	0	0	0	1 (Note: Appearance/s in the FA Trophy)	0	7	0
St Ives Town (loan)	2023–24	Southern Premier Division Central	16	6	—		—		1 (Note: One appearance in Huntingdonshire Senior Cup)	0	17	6
St Ives Town	2024–25	Southern Premier Division Central	7	1	3	1	—		0	0	10	2
Dorking Wanderers	2024–25	National League South	11	2	0	0	—		1	0	12	2
Welling United (loan)	2024–25	National League South	8	0	—		—		—		8	0
Wingate & Finchley (loan)	2024–25	Isthmian League; Premier Division	14	3	—		—		—		14	3
Career total			73	14	3	1	1	0	6	0	83	15
