= Jamie Reid (footballer, born July 1994) =

Northern Irish footballer

Personal information
- Full name: James Tyrrell Reid
- Date of birth: 15 July 1994 (age 32)
- Place of birth: Torquay, England
- Height: 5 ft 11 in (1.81 m)
- Position: Forward

Team information
- Current team: Reading
- Number: 9

Youth career
- 2004–2012: Exeter City

Senior career*
Years	Team	Apps	(Gls)
2012–2017	Exeter City	23	(3)
2012	→ Dorchester Town (loan)	12	(3)
2015	→ Truro City (loan)	5	(3)
2015	→ Torquay United (loan)	2	(0)
2016–2017	→ Torquay United (loan)	46	(4)
2017	→ Torquay United (loan)	12	(1)
2017–2020	Torquay United	103	(52)
2020–2021	Mansfield Town	39	(6)
2021–2026	Stevenage	211	(57)
2026–	Reading	10	(0)

International career^{‡}
2013	Northern Ireland U21	2	(0)
2024–	Northern Ireland	12	(2)
- * Club domestic league appearances and goals as of 11:11, 8 November 2026 (UTC) ‡ National team caps and goals as of 13 October 2025

James Tyrrell Reid (born 15 July 1994) is a professional footballer who plays as a forward for EFL League One club Reading. Born in England, he plays for the Northern Ireland national team.

== Early life ==
Born in Torquay, Devon, Reid attended South Dartmoor Community College together with both Ollie Watkins and Matt Jay.

== Club career ==
=== Exeter City ===
Reid graduated from the Exeter City youth team to turn professional in April 2012.

Reid made his debut for Exeter on 26 December 2012, receiving praise for his performance in a 3–1 defeat to Oxford United at St James Park.

=== Dorchester Town ===
He was loaned out to Conference South side Dorchester Town in July 2012.

=== Torquay United ===
On 18 February 2015, Jamie Reid completed a loan move to Torquay United.

=== Truro City ===
On 29 September 2015, Reid joined Truro City on a one-month loan. He made his debut just four days later, opening the scoring by lobbing the keeper from 20 yards out just eight minutes into a 3–0 win over Havant & Waterlooville.

On 26 October, Steve Tully announced that Reid's loan had been extended by another month.

=== Torquay United ===
On 25 July 2016, Reid completed a three-month loan move to Torquay United. On 5 January 2017 Reid's loan was extended until the end of the 2016–17 season.

On 30 June 2017, he returned to Torquay United on a six-month loan deal.

On 20 October 2017, Reid signed an 18-month contract with Torquay United after spending 10 years at Exeter City, beginning in the youth system and earning a professional contract in May 2011. During the 2018–19 season Reid would score 32 goals in a promotion season for Torquay, receiving the club's Player of the Year award and the golden boot. He was also included in the National League South Team of the Year and was named as the Player of the Year after securing the golden boot.

=== Mansfield Town ===
Reid joined League Two club Mansfield Town on a two-year contract on 23 June 2020. He scored his first goal for Mansfield on 10 November 2020 in an EFL Trophy group game against Scunthorpe United.

=== Stevenage ===
Reid signed for fellow League Two club Stevenage on 13 July 2021. He scored an 88th minute penalty to equalise the match in a third round FA Cup tie away at Premier League side Aston Villa as Stevenage prevailed 2–1 at Villa Park, as well as helping them gain promotion to League One. He scored 23 goals in all competitions for Stevenage in the 2023–24 season, with 18 of them being in the league. This form saw him included in the EFL League One Team of the Season.

On 19 May 2025, the club announced the player had agreed a new contract.

=== Reading ===
On 31 August 2026, Reid joined Reading for an undisclosed fee signing a two-year contract.

== International career ==
Reid was called up to represent Northern Ireland U21 during his time at Exeter City, and he made two appearances for them in 2013.

Reid scored on his international debut for Northern Ireland on 22 March 2024 in the 1–1 draw against Romania.

He is eligible to represent Northern Ireland through his maternal grandmother.

== Career statistics ==
=== Club ===
As of match played 7 November 2026

Appearances and goals by club, season and competition
Club	Season	League			FA Cup		League Cup		Other		Total	
Club	Season	Division	Apps	Goals	Apps	Goals	Apps	Goals	Apps	Goals	Apps	Goals
Exeter City	2012–13	League Two	4	2	0	0	0	0	0	0	4	2
Exeter City	2013–14	League Two	6	0	0	0	1	0	1 (Note: Appearances in the Football League Trophy)	0	8	0
Exeter City	2014–15	League Two	0	0	0	0	0	0	0	0	0	0
Exeter City	2015–16	League Two	13	1	2	0	0	0	1	0	16	1
Exeter City	2016–17	League Two	0	0	0	0	0	0	0	0	0	0
Exeter City	Total		23	3	2	0	1	0	2	0	28	3
Dorchester Town (loan)	2012–13	Conference South	12	3	1	0	—		0	0	13	3
Torquay United (loan)	2014–15	Conference Premier	2	0	0	0	—		0	0	2	0
Truro City (loan)	2015–16	National League South	5	3	0	0	—		0	0	5	3
Torquay United (loan)	2016–17	National League	46	4	0	0	—		1 (Note: Appearance in the FA Trophy)	0	47	4
Torquay United	2017–18 (Note: Reid made fifteen appearances and scored one goal for Torquay United on loan from Exeter City before signing permanently on 20 October 2017)	National League	41	6	1	0	—		1	0	43	6
Torquay United	2018–19	National League South	42	29	4	2	—		2	1	48	32
Torquay United	2019–20	National League	32	18	2	1	—		2	2	36	21
Torquay United	Total		163	57	7	3	—		6	3	176	63
Mansfield Town	2020–21	League Two	39	6	2	0	1	0	3	1	45	7
Stevenage	2021–22	League Two	38	7	3	1	2	1	4	1	47	10
Stevenage	2022–23	League Two	45	10	4	3	2	1	4	0	55	14
Stevenage	2023–24	League One	42	18	4	3	2	0	2	1	50	22
Stevenage	2024–25	League One	42	8	1	1	0	0	2	0	45	9
Stevenage	2025–26	League One	44	14	1	0	1	0	2 (Note: Appearances in 2026 League One play-offs)	0	48	14
Stevenage	Total		211	57	13	8	7	2	14	2	245	69
Reading	2026–27	League One	10	0	1	2	1	0	0	0	12	2
Career total			463	129	26	12	10	2	25	6	524	150

=== International ===
Appearances and goals by national team and year
National team	Year	Apps	Goals
Northern Ireland	2024	8	1
Northern Ireland	2025	5	1
Northern Ireland	2026	3	0
Total		16	2

Scores and results list Northern Ireland's goal tally first, score column indicates score after each Reid goal.

List of international goals scored by Jamie Reid
No.	Date	Venue	Cap	Opponent	Score	Result	Competition
1	22 March 2024	Arena Națională, Bucharest, Romania	1	Romania	1–0	1–1	Friendly
2	4 September 2025	Stade de Luxembourg, Luxembourg City, Luxembourg	9	Luxembourg	1–0	3–1	2026 FIFA World Cup qualification

== Honours ==
Torquay United

- National League South: 2018–19

Stevenage

- EFL League Two second-place promotion: 2022–23

Individual

- National League South Team of the Year: 2018–19
- National League South Player of the Year: 2018–19
- EFL League One Team of the Season: 2023–24
