= Reece Hannam =

English association football player

Personal information
- Full name: Reece Phillip Peter Hannam
- Date of birth: 11 September 2000 (age 26)
- Place of birth: Enfield, England
- Height: 1.78 m (5 ft 10 in)
- Position: Left-back

Team information
- Current team: VfR Aalen
- Number: 14

Youth career
- –2020: West Ham United
- 2020–2021: Crystal Palace

Senior career*
Years	Team	Apps	(Gls)
2021–2023	Crystal Palace	0	(0)
2022–2023	→ Bromley (loan)	20	(2)
2023–2024	Stevenage	5	(0)
2024	AFC Croydon Athletic	20	(1)
2024–	VfR Aalen	45	(5)
- * Club domestic league appearances and goals as of 10:30, 15 September 2025 (UTC)

Reece Phillip Peter Hannam (born 11 September 2000) is an English professional footballer who plays as a left back for Regionalliga club VfR Aalen.

A product of the West Ham United and Crystal Palace academies, Hannam signed his first professional contract at Crystal Palace following his release from West Ham. He spent the first half of the 2022–23 season on loan at Bromley where he gained his first experience of regular senior football. Hannam was released by Crystal Palace in June 2023 and signed for League One club Stevenage in August that year.

== Early life ==
Born in Enfield, London, Hannam started playing in the West Ham United pre-academy at the age of six.

== Career ==
=== Crystal Palace ===
Having progressed at West Ham through to playing regularly in the under-18 team, Hannam earned a two-year academy scholarship in May 2017. He made three EFL Trophy appearances for West Ham's under-21 team and also played for the under-23 team during his time there. He was released by West Ham in February 2020 and joined Crystal Palace on trial in March 2020, ultimately spending six months training on his own due to the COVID-19 pandemic. The trial proved successful and Hannam signed a one-year contract for the 2020–21 season. Hannam was called up to the Crystal Palace first-team squad for the club's Premier League match against Fulham on 28 February 2021 and was an unused substitute in a 0–0 draw. He signed a three-year contract extension in March 2021, and was named under-23 Player of the Year for the 2020–21 season in June 2021, having captained the team to promotion that season.

Hannam was part of new Crystal Palace manager Patrick Vieira's pre-season squad ahead of the 2021–22 season, although he had a groin injury before the season began, halting his involvement in both the first and under-23 squads. Nearing a return from injury, Hannam developed pericarditis, which meant he was unable to exercise and did not return to playing football until April 2022.

==== Loan to Bromley ====
Ahead of the 2022–23 season, having stated he felt he needed to gain first-team experience playing senior football, Hannam joined National League club Bromley on an initial season-long loan agreement on 16 July 2022. He debuted for Bromley in a 3–2 away defeat to Wealdstone on 6 August 2022, before scoring his first goal in senior football in a 1–0 away victory against Aldershot Town on 20 August 2022. Having scored two goals in 18 appearances during the first half of the season, Hannam was recalled by Crystal Palace in January 2023. He was released in June 2023.

=== Stevenage ===
Hannam trialled with League One club Stevenage during pre-season ahead of the 2023–24 season, signing a contract on 14 August 2023. He made his English Football League debut as a 67th-minute substitute in a 2–0 defeat away to Reading on 19 August 2023.

=== AFC Croydon Athletic ===
On 20 February 2024, Hannam was announced to have joined Combined Counties League Premier Division South club AFC Croydon Athletic.

=== VfR Aalen ===
On 20 August 2024, Hannam signed for German Oberliga Baden-Württemberg on an initial one-year deal.

== Career statistics ==
As of 19 February 2024

Appearances and goals by club, season and competition
Club	Season	League			FA Cup		EFL Cup		Other		Total	
Club	Season	Division	Apps	Goals	Apps	Goals	Apps	Goals	Apps	Goals	Apps	Goals
Crystal Palace	2020–21	Premier League	0	0	0	0	0	0	0	0	0	0
Crystal Palace	2021–22	Premier League	0	0	0	0	0	0	0	0	0	0
Crystal Palace	2022–23	Premier League	0	0	0	0	0	0	0	0	0	0
Crystal Palace	Total		0	0	0	0	0	0	0	0	0	0
Crystal Palace U21	2021–22	—							1 (Note: Appearance(s) in EFL Trophy)	0	1	0
Bromley (loan)	2022–23	National League	17	2	1	0	—		0	0	18	2
Stevenage	2023–24	League One	3	0	0	0	1	0	3	0	7	0
Career total			20	2	1	0	1	0	4	0	26	2
