= Florian Yonsian =

Ivorian footballer

Personal information
- Full name: Monimon De Louis Florian Yonsian
- Date of birth: 25 November 2000 (age 25)
- Place of birth: Republic of Côte d'Ivoire
- Position: Forward

Team information
- Current team: Holywell Town
- Number: 27

Youth career
- 2014–2019: Rochdale

Senior career*
Years	Team	Apps	(Gls)
2018–2019	Rochdale	0	(0)
2019–2020	Salford City	0	(0)
2019–2020	→ Stafford Rangers (loan)	2	(0)
2020	→ Marine (loan)	4	(0)
2020	Trafford	6	(0)
2021	Stalybridge Celtic	0	(0)
2021–2022	Ashton United	30	(10)
2024	Warrington Rylands	0	(0)
2024	Hyde United	3	(1)
2024	Flint Town United	21	(7)
2025–2026	Örebro Syrianska	8	(2)
2026–	Holywell Town	15	(7)
- * Club domestic league appearances and goals as of 08:02, 8 November 2026 (UTC)

Monimon De Louis Florian Yonsian (born 25 November 2000) is an Ivorian footballer who plays as a forward for Holywell Town.

== Career history ==
=== Rochdale ===
Yonsian started his career with Rochdale joining the club as a 14 year old. In the summer of 2017 he was one of a number of players who signed a two-year full time scholarship. He made his first-team debut for the club on 7 November 2018 in a Football League Trophy tie against the under-21 team of Leicester City. He went on to make two more appearances in the competition, one against Oldham Athletic, and third against the under-21 team of Manchester City. At the end of the season he was released, having not been offered a professional contract by the club.

=== Non-League ===
In July 2019 he signed for Salford City. In December 2019 he joined Stafford Rangers on loan and made his debut for the club the following day.

In January 2020 he joined Marine on loan, playing four league games for them before returning to Salford.

In the summer of 2020 he played for Trafford in various pre-season games before joining the club in September.

In May 2021 he signed for Stalybridge Celtic but did not play a competitive game for the club and left in July.

In October he signed for Ashton United.

In February 2024, Yonsian joined Warrington Rylands.

In July 2024, Yonsian joined Cymru Premier club Flint Town United and left the club at the end of the year.

In summer 2026 he returned to Wales, signing for newly promoted Cymru Premier side Holywell Town.

== Career statistics ==
As of match played 8 January 2019

Club	Season	League			FA Cup		League Cup		Other		Total	
Club	Season	Division	Apps	Goals	Apps	Goals	Apps	Goals	Apps	Goals	Apps	Goals
Rochdale	2018–19	EFL League One	0	0	0	0	0	0	3	0	3	0
Career total			0	0	0	0	0	0	0	0	3	0
