= 2023–24 Stevenage F.C. season =

48th season in existence of Stevenage FC

Stevenage
2023–24 season
- Chairman: Phil Wallace
- Manager: Steve Evans (until 17 April); Alex Revell (interim, from 17 April)
- Stadium: Broadhall Way
- League One: 9th
- FA Cup: Third round
- EFL Cup: Second round
- EFL Trophy: Group stage
Third colours

The 2023–24 season was the 48th season in the history of Stevenage and their first season back in League One since the 2013–14 season following their promotion from League Two in the previous season. The club participated in League One, the FA Cup, the EFL Cup, and the 2023–24 EFL Trophy.

Manager Steve Evans left the club on 17 April 2024, to take the role of manager of Rotherham United, with Alex Revell becoming manager on an interim basis. Following the end of the season, Revell became manager on a permanent basis.

== Current squad ==
As of 7 March 2024

No.	Name	Position	Nationality	Place of birth	Date of birth (age)	Previous club	Date signed	Fee	Contract end
Goalkeepers
1	Taye Ashby-Hammond	GK	(England)	Richmond	21 March 1999 (age 27)	Fulham	1 July 2023	Free	30 June 2025
12	Craig MacGillivray	GK	(Scotland)	Perth	12 January 1993 (age 33)	Milton Keynes Dons	18 January 2024	Loan	31 May 2024
50	Max Woodford	GK	(England)			Academy	11 November 2023	Trainee	30 June 2026
Defenders
2	Luther James-Wildin	RB	(Antigua and Barbuda)	Leicester	3 December 1997 (age 28)	Nuneaton Borough	1 July 2018	Undisclosed	30 June 2025
3	Dan Butler	LB	(England)	Cowes	26 August 1994 (age 32)	Peterborough United	7 July 2023	Undisclosed	30 June 2025
4	Nathan Thompson	CB	(England)	Chester	9 November 1990 (age 36)	Peterborough United	1 July 2023	Free	30 June 2024
5	Carl Piergianni	CB	(England)	Peterborough	3 May 1992 (age 34)	Oldham Athletic	1 July 2022	Free	30 June 2025
6	Dan Sweeney	CB	(England)	Kingston upon Thames	25 April 1994 (age 32)	Forest Green Rovers	1 July 2022	Free	30 June 2025
14	Kane Smith	RB	(England)	Luton	7 February 1996 (age 30)	Boreham Wood	1 July 2022	Free	30 June 2025
15	Terence Vancooten	CB	(Guyana)	Kingston upon Thames	29 December 1997 (age 28)	Reading	18 July 2017	Free	30 June 2025
17	Finley Burns	CB	(England)	Southwark	17 July 2003 (age 23)	Manchester City	1 August 2023	Loan	31 May 2024
22	Nesta Guinness-Walker	LB	(England)	Twickenham	14 September 1999 (age 27)	Reading	24 January 2024	Loan	31 May 2024
—N/a	Owen Cochrane	RB	(England)	Huntingdon	3 September 2004 (age 22)	Academy	2 July 2023	Trainee	30 June 2024
Midfielders
7	Alex MacDonald	RM	(Scotland)	Warrington	14 April 1990 (age 36)	Gillingham	1 July 2023	Free	30 June 2024
8	Jake Forster-Caskey	CM	(England)	Southend-on-Sea	25 April 1994 (age 32)	Charlton Athletic	3 January 2023	Undisclosed	30 June 2025
10	Nick Freeman	CM	(England)	Stevenage	7 November 1995 (age 31)	Wycombe Wanderers	1 July 2023	Free	30 June 2025
11	Jordan Roberts	LM	(England)	Watford	5 January 1994 (age 32)	Motherwell	1 July 2022	Free	30 June 2025
18	Harvey White	DM	(England)	Maidstone	19 September 2001 (age 25)	Tottenham Hotspur	2 September 2023	Undisclosed	30 June 2025
23	Louis Thompson	CM	(Wales)	Bristol	19 December 1994 (age 31)	Portsmouth	1 July 2023	Free	30 June 2025
24	Ben Thompson	CM	(England)	Sidcup	3 October 1995 (age 31)	Peterborough United	28 June 2023	Undisclosed	30 June 2025
Forwards
9	Elliott List	RW	(England)	Camberwell	12 May 1997 (age 29)	Gillingham	31 August 2019	Undisclosed	30 June 2024
19	Jamie Reid	CF	(Northern Ireland)	Torquay	15 July 1994 (age 32)	Mansfield Town	13 July 2021	Undisclosed	30 June 2025
20	Aaron Pressley	CF	(Scotland)	Edinburgh	7 November 2001 (age 25)	Brentford	2 August 2023	Compensation	30 June 2025
29	Kane Hemmings	CF	(England)	Burton upon Trent	8 April 1991 (age 35)	Tranmere Rovers	2 September 2023	Free	30 June 2025
33	Vadaine Oliver	CF	(England)	Sheffield	21 October 1991 (age 35)	Bradford City	17 January 2024	Loan	31 May 2024
42	Theo Alexandrou	CF	(England)			Academy	29 August 2023	Trainee	30 June 2024
44	Makise Evans	CF	(England)		20 August 2006 (age 20)	Academy	13 November 2023	Trainee	30 June 2024
Out on Loan
16	Harry Anderson	RM	(England)	Chertsey	9 January 1997 (age 29)	Bristol Rovers	1 July 2023	Free	30 June 2025
41	Rylee Mitchell	GK	(England)			Academy	5 September 2023	Trainee	30 June 2024
43	David Hicks	CM	(England)		2 May 2006 (age 20)	Academy	29 August 2023	Trainee	30 June 2025

== Transfers ==
=== In ===
Date	Pos	Player	Transferred from	Fee	Ref
28 June 2023	CM	Ben Thompson (ENG)	Peterborough United (ENG)	Undisclosed	
1 July 2023	RM	Harry Anderson (ENG)	Bristol Rovers (ENG)	Free transfer	
1 July 2023	GK	Taye Ashby-Hammond (ENG)	Fulham (ENG)	Free transfer	
1 July 2023	CM	Nick Freeman (ENG)	Wycombe Wanderers (ENG)	Free transfer	
1 July 2023	RM	Alex MacDonald (SCO)	Gillingham (ENG)	Free transfer	
1 July 2023	CM	Louis Thompson (WAL)	Portsmouth (ENG)	Free transfer	
1 July 2023	CB	Nathan Thompson (ENG)	Peterborough United (ENG)	Free transfer	
7 July 2023	LB	Dan Butler (ENG)	Peterborough United (ENG)	Undisclosed	
2 August 2023	CF	Aaron Pressley (SCO)	Brentford (ENG)	Compensation	
14 August 2023	LB	Reece Hannam (ENG)	Crystal Palace (ENG)	Free transfer	
2 September 2023	CF	Kane Hemmings (ENG)	Tranmere Rovers (ENG)	Free transfer	
2 September 2023	DM	Harvey White (ENG)	Tottenham Hotspur (ENG)	Undisclosed	

=== Out ===
Date	Pos	Player	Transferred to	Fee	Ref
14 June 2023	CF	Danny Rose (ENG)	Grimsby Town (ENG)	Undisclosed	
30 June 2023	CB	Michael Bostwick (ENG)	Boston United (ENG)	Released	
30 June 2023	LB	Max Clark (ENG)	Gillingham (ENG)	Released	
30 June 2023	CF	Luke Norris (ENG)	Tranmere Rovers (ENG)	Released	
30 June 2023	GK	Adam Przybek (WAL)	Free agent	Released	
30 June 2023	CM	Jake Reeves (ENG)	AFC Wimbledon (ENG)	Free transfer	
30 June 2023	DM	Jack Smith (ENG)	King's Lynn Town (ENG)	Released	
30 June 2023	CM	Jake Taylor (WAL)	Eastleigh (ENG)	Released	
30 June 2023	LB	Sam Tinubu (ENG)	Free agent	Released	
30 June 2023	CB	Mackye Townsend-West (ENG)	Free agent	Released	
30 June 2023	CM	Alfie Williams (ENG)	Free agent	Released	
21 July 2023	CF	Finlay Johnson (ENG)	Cardiff City (WAL)	Compensation	
1 September 2023	CF	Josh March (ENG)	Harrogate Town (ENG)	Undisclosed	
1 February 2024	LB	Reece Hannam (ENG)	Free agent	Mutual Consent	

=== Loaned in ===
Date	Pos	Player	Loaned from	Until	Ref
21 July 2023	GK	Krisztián Hegyi (HUN)	West Ham United (ENG)	3 January 2024 (Note: On 3 January, Hegyi returned to West Ham United early from his season-long loan.)	
1 August 2023	CB	Finley Burns (ENG)	Manchester City (ENG)	End of season	
14 August 2023	CM	Harrison Neal (ENG)	Sheffield United (ENG)	3 January 2024 (Note: On 3 January, Neal returned to Sheffield United early from his season-long loan.)	
1 September 2023	CF	Charlie McNeill (ENG)	Manchester United (ENG)	3 January 2024 (Note: On 3 January, McNeill returned to Manchester United early from his season-long loan.)	
17 January 2024	CF	Vadaine Oliver (ENG)	Bradford City (ENG)	End of season	
18 January 2024	GK	Craig MacGillivray (SCO)	Milton Keynes Dons (ENG)	End of season	
24 January 2024	LB	Nesta Guinness-Walker (ENG)	Reading (ENG)	End of season	

=== Loaned out ===
Date	Pos	Player	Loaned to	Until	Ref
31 July 2023	RB	Owen Cochrane (ENG)	Kettering Town (ENG)	20 November 2023 (Note: On 20 November, Cochrane was recalled back from his loan at Kettering.)	
2 October 2023	CF	Theo Alexandrou (ENG)	Cheshunt (ENG)	30 October 2023	
21 November 2023	RB	Owen Cochrane (ENG)	Aveley (ENG)	2 January 2024	
26 January 2024	RM	Harry Anderson (ENG)	Colchester United (ENG)	End of season	
26 January 2024	CM	David Hicks (ENG)	Potters Bar Town (ENG)	24 February 2024	
31 January 2024	GK	Rylee Mitchell (ENG)	Potters Bar Town (ENG)	28 February 2024	
29 March 2024	GK	Rylee Mitchell (ENG)	Royston Town (ENG)	End of season	

== Pre-season and friendlies ==
On 30 May, Stevenage announced their first pre-season friendly, against Watford. A second friendly match was confirmed on 5 June, against Ipswich Town. A day later three away pre-season fixtures was added to the schedule, against St Neots Town, Hitchin Town and Stamford. On 1 July, Boro announced two further friendlies, against Colchester United and a Tottenham Hotspur XI.

Win Draw Loss Fixtures

8 July 2023 Friendly	St Neots Town	0–2	Stevenage	St Neots
15:00 BST		Report	Piergianni 5'; Smith 28'	Stadium: Rowley Park; Attendance: 810

11 July 2023 Friendly	Hitchin Town	0–3	Stevenage	Hitchin
19:45 BST		Report	Reid 35', 39' (pen.); Forster-Caskey 81'	Stadium: Top Field; Attendance: 1,033

15 July 2023 Friendly	Stamford	2–1	Stevenage	Stamford
14:00 BST	Miller 20'; Charles 75'	Report	Forster-Caskey 23'	Stadium: Zeeco Stadium; Attendance: 389

18 July 2023 Friendly	Stevenage	Cancelled	Watford	Stevenage
19:45 BST				Stadium: Broadhall Way
Note: Due to the two sides being drawn against each other in the 2023–24 EFL Cup the friendly was cancelled.

18 July 2023 Friendly	Stevenage	1–1	Colchester United	St Neots
19:45 BST	Roberts 41'	Report	Fevrier 38'	Stadium: Rowley Park; Attendance: 301

22 July 2023 Friendly	Stevenage	2–1	Ipswich Town	Stevenage
15:30 BST	Reid 5'; Thompson 49'	Report	Hirst 68'	Stadium: Broadhall Way; Attendance: 1,826 (inc. 788 away)

29 July 2023 Friendly	Stevenage	4–0	Tottenham Hotspur XI	Stevenage
15:00 BST	Freeman 23', 38'; Piergianni 48'; Linton 52' (o.g.)	Report		Stadium: Broadhall Way; Attendance: 2,045 (inc. 319 away)

== Competitions ==
=== Overall record ===
Competition	Starting round	Final position	Record							
Competition	Starting round	Final position	Pld	W	D	L	GF	GA	GD	Win %
League One	Matchday 1		43	18	13	12	53	42	+11	41.86
FA Cup	First round	Third round	4	1	2	1	8	8	+0	25.00
EFL Cup	First round	Second round	2	0	2	0	2	2	+0	0.00
EFL Trophy	Group stage	Group stage	3	1	1	1	6	4	+2	33.33
Total			52	20	18	14	69	56	+13	38.46

Last updated: 9 April 2024
Source: Soccerway

=== League One ===
==== League table ====
Pos	Team	Pld	W	D	L	GF	GA	GD	Pts	Promotion, qualification or relegation
6	Barnsley	46	21	13	12	82	64	+18	76	Qualification for League One play-offs
7	Lincoln City	46	20	14	12	65	40	+25	74	
8	Blackpool	46	21	10	15	65	48	+17	73	
9	Stevenage	46	19	14	13	57	46	+11	71	
10	Wycombe Wanderers	46	17	14	15	60	55	+5	65	
11	Leyton Orient	46	18	11	17	53	55	−2	65	
12	Wigan Athletic	46	20	10	16	63	56	+7	62 (Note: On 19 May 2023, Wigan Athletic were deducted four points for failing to pay players and staff on time following previous EFL rules breaches in the 2022–23 season. Another four-point deduction was applied on 26 May, after the club's owners missed a deadline to deposit an amount equalling 125% of its monthly wage bill.)	

Source: EFL Official Website
Rules for classification: 1) Points; 2) Goal difference; 3) Number of goals scored; 4) Head-to-head results; 5) Wins; 6) Away goals; 7) Penalty points (sec 9.5); 8) 12-point sending off offences

==== Results summary ====
Overall								Home						Away					
Pld	W	D	L	GF	GA	GD	Pts	W	D	L	GF	GA	GD	W	D	L	GF	GA	GD
45	18	14	13	55	45	+10	68	9	8	5	25	18	+7	9	6	8	30	27	+3

Last updated: 19 April 2024.
Source: Soccerway

==== Results by round ====
Round	1	2	3	4	5	6	7	8	9	10	11	12	13	14	15	16	17	18	19	20	21	22	23	24	26	28	30	31	27^{2}	32	33	34	35	25^{1}	36	37	38	39	40	41	42	43	29^{3}	44	45	46
Ground	A	H	A	A	H	A	H	H	A	H	A	H	A	H	A	H	A	H	A	H	A	H	A	H	A	A	A	H	H	A	H	A	H	H	A	H	A	H	A	H	A	A	H	H	A	H
Result	W	W	W	L	D	W	D	D	W	L	L	W	L	D	D	W	W	W	W	D	W	D	L	W	L	W	W	W	L	D	L	L	W	W	D	D	L	L	D	D	D	L	W	L	D	W
Position	9	3	3	5	5	3	1	4	3	3	5	5	5	6	7	6	5	4	4	4	3	5	6	5	7	7	6	6	6	7	7	7	6	6	6	6	6	8	7	8	8	9	9	9	9	9

Updated to match(es) played on 19 April 2024. Source: Soccerway
A = Away; H = Home; W = Win; D = Draw; L = Loss; P = Postponed
Notes:
- ^{1} Matchday 25 (vs Cambridge United) was postponed due to a local area power cut.
- ^{2} Matchday 27 (vs Reading) was postponed due to FA Cup involvement.
- ^{3} Matchday 29 (vs Barnsley) was postponed due to a frozen pitch.

==== Matches ====
On 22 June, the EFL League One fixtures were released.

Win Draw Loss Fixtures

5 August 2023 1	Northampton Town	0–1	Stevenage	Northampton
15:00 BST	Odimayo (yellow card) 17'; Hoskins (yellow card) 69'	Report	Piergianni (yellow card) 4' (goal) 80'; Butler (yellow card) 88'; Burns (yellow card) 90+13'	Stadium: Sixfields Stadium; Attendance: 7,049; Referee: Lewis Smith

12 August 2023 2	Stevenage	2–0	Shrewsbury Town	Stevenage
15:00 BST	Pressley 58'; Reid 87'	Report	Bayliss (yellow card) 50'; Winchester (yellow card) 74'; Kenneh (yellow card) 86'	Stadium: Broadhall Way; Attendance: 3,962; Referee: Craig Hicks

15 August 2023 3	Cambridge United	1–2	Stevenage	Cambridge
19:45 BST	Kachunga 80'	Report	Roberts 27'; Thompson (yellow card) 32'; Butler (yellow card) 68'; Reid 82' (yellow card) 83'	Stadium: Abbey Stadium; Attendance: 7,529; Referee: Will Finnie

19 August 2023 4	Reading	2–0	Stevenage	Reading
15:00 BST	Ehibhatiomhan 45+4', 57'	Report	Thompson (yellow card) 5' (yellow-red card) 22'; Reid (yellow card) 10'; MacDonald (yellow card) 26'; Neal (yellow card) 69'	Stadium: Madejski Stadium; Attendance: 11,674; Referee: Anthony Backhouse

26 August 2023 5	Stevenage	0–0	Portsmouth	Stevenage
15:00 BST	Thompson (yellow card) 22'; Forster-Caskey (red card) 56'; Reid (yellow card) 62'; Ashby-Hammond (yellow card) 90+8'; List (yellow card) 90+10'	Report	Whyte (yellow card) 44'; Rafferty (red card) 56'; Kamara (yellow card) 69'; Swanson (yellow card) 90+11'	Stadium: Broadhall Way; Attendance: 5,352; Referee: Simon Mather

2 September 2023 6	Leyton Orient	0–3	Stevenage	Leyton
15:00 BST	Forde (yellow card) 16'; Turns (yellow card) 32'	Report	McNeill 21'; Sweeney 44'; Freeman 79'; Roberts (yellow card) 86'	Stadium: Brisbane Road; Attendance: 8,287; Referee: Scott Oldham

9 September 2023 7	Stevenage	2–2	Carlisle United	Stevenage
15:00 BST	Reid 15', 74'; McNeill (yellow card) 37'; Roberts (yellow card) 72'	Report	Maguire 20'; Gibson (yellow card) 31'; Guy (yellow card) 83'; Garner 90'	Stadium: Broadhall Way; Attendance: 4,228; Referee: Darren Drysdale

16 September 2023 8	Stevenage	1–1	Charlton Athletic	Stevenage
15:00 BST	Reid 34' (yellow card) 68'; Butler (yellow card) 54'; List (yellow card) 90+10'	Report	Dobson (yellow card) 51'; Tedić (yellow card) 83'; Aneke (yellow card) 84'; Blackett-Taylor 90+2' (pen.)	Stadium: Broadhall Way; Attendance: 5,118; Referee: Peter Wright

23 September 2023 9	Cheltenham Town	0–3	Stevenage	Cheltenham
15:00 BST	Keena (yellow card) 30'	Report	Roberts 7'; Thompson (yellow card) 45+3'; List 69', 73'	Stadium: Whaddon Road; Attendance: 3,947; Referee: Leigh Doughty

30 September 2023 10	Stevenage	1–3	Oxford United	Stevenage
15:00 BST	Reid 15'; Butler (yellow card) 65'	Report	Leigh 23', 55'; Moore (yellow card) 45+4' (goal) 82'; Beadle (yellow card) 90+5'	Stadium: Broadhall Way; Attendance: 5,512; Referee: Carl Brook

3 October 2023 11	Bolton Wanderers	3–2	Stevenage	Horwich
19:45 BST	Charles 13' (pen.); Thomason (yellow card) 29'; Iredale (yellow card) 44' (goal) 49'; Jerome (yellow card) 64'; Sheehan 70'	Report	Reid 20', 65' (pen.) (yellow card) 68'; Sweeney (yellow card) 69'	Stadium: Toughsheet Community Stadium; Attendance: 17,997; Referee: Josh Smith

7 October 2023 12	Stevenage	1–0	Wigan Athletic	Stevenage
15:00 BST	Pressley 9' (pen.); Sweeney (yellow card) 52'; Thompson (yellow card) 67'; MacDonald (red card) 77'; Butler (yellow card) 78'	Report	Sessegnon (yellow card) 4'; Aasgaard (yellow card) 13'; Lang (yellow card) 22' (yellow-red card) 34'; Rekik (yellow card) 55'; Shaw (yellow card) 69'; Hughes (yellow card) 78'; Clare (yellow card) 78'; Magennis (yellow card) 88'; Tickle (yellow card) 90+10'; Pearce (yellow card) 90+10'	Stadium: Broadhall Way; Attendance: 4,402; Referee: Alan Young

14 October 2023 13	Blackpool	3–0	Stevenage	Blackpool
15:00 BST	Rhodes 38'; Carey (yellow card) 43'; Dale 60'; Hamilton 78'	Report	Pressley (yellow card) 7'; Thompson (yellow card) 13'; Vancooten (yellow card) 53'	Stadium: Bloomfield Road; Attendance: 10,516; Referee: Paul Howard

21 October 2023 14	Stevenage	0–0	Port Vale	Stevenage
15:00 GMT	Roberts (yellow card) 34'; Thompson (yellow card) 50'; Smith (yellow card) 80'	Report	Arblaster (yellow card) 28'; Smith (yellow card) 38'; Balmer (yellow card) 45'	Stadium: Broadhall Way; Attendance: 4,047; Referee: Scott Jackson

24 October 2023 15	Bristol Rovers	1–1	Stevenage	Horfield
19:45 GMT	Finley (yellow card) 37'; Evans (yellow card) 46'; Collins (yellow card) 57'; Martin 83'; Crama (yellow card) 84'; Taylor (yellow card) 88'; Gibbons (yellow card) 90+3'	Report	Thompson (yellow card) 33'; Reid 40'; Freeman (yellow card) 45+2'; James-Wildin (yellow card) 61'; Burns (yellow card) 73'	Stadium: Memorial Stadium; Attendance: 7,143; Referee: Matt Donohue

28 October 2023 16	Stevenage	3–1	Derby County	Stevenage
15:00 GMT	Roberts 32'; MacDonald 45+2'; Reid (yellow card) 59'; Piergianni (yellow card) 71'; Hemmings 84'	Report	Cashin (yellow card) 11'; Forsyth (yellow card) 30'; Mendez-Laing 38'	Stadium: Broadhall Way; Attendance: 5,866; Referee: Thomas Kirk

11 November 2023 17	Wycombe Wanderers	0–1	Stevenage	High Wycombe
15:00 GMT	Forino-Joseph (yellow card) 60'; Leahy (yellow card) 79'; Stryjek (yellow card) 90+12'	Report	Reid 45+14'; Thompson (yellow card) 75'; Forster-Caskey (yellow card) 90+23'	Stadium: Adams Park; Attendance: 4,936; Referee: Ben Speedie

18 November 2023 18	Stevenage	1–0	Lincoln City	Stevenage
15:00 GMT	Piergianni (yellow card) 28'; Reid 68'	Report	Jackson (yellow card) 81'	Stadium: Broadhall Way; Attendance: 5,045; Referee: Scott Simpson

15 November 2023 19	Fleetwood Town	0–3	Stevenage	Fleetwood
15:00 GMT		Report	Reid 8'; Thompson 56'; List 90+5'	Stadium: Highbury Stadium; Attendance: 2,771; Referee: Christopher Pollard

28 November 2023 20	Stevenage	2–2	Peterborough United	Stevenage
19:45 GMT	James-Wildin 22'; Thompson 30'; Piergianni (yellow card) 34'; Ashby-Hammond (yellow card) 66'	Report	Randall 51'; Edwards 81'	Stadium: Broadhall Way; Attendance: 5,041; Referee: Sunny Gill

9 December 2023 21	Burton Albion	1–2	Stevenage	Burton upon Trent
15:00 GMT	Powell (penalty missed) 7; Oshilaja 7' (yellow card) 77'; Stockton (yellow card) 66'; Hughes (yellow card) 90+3'	Report	Hemmings 45+1'; Reid 51' (pen.); Neal (yellow card) 61'; Forster-Caskey (yellow card) 63'	Stadium: Pirelli Stadium; Attendance: 2,406; Referee: Ben Atkinson

16 December 2023 22	Stevenage	1–1	Exeter City	Stevenage
15:00 GMT	Piergianni 45+1'; Butler (yellow card) 53'	Report	Aitchison (yellow card) 23' (yellow-red card) 43'; Taylor (yellow card) 43'; Sweeney (yellow card) 46'; Wildschut 47'; Sinisalo (yellow card) 64'; Niskanen (yellow card) 75'	Stadium: Broadhall Way; Attendance: 4,007; Referee: Ross Joyce

23 December 2023 23	Barnsley	2–1	Stevenage	Barnsley
15:00 GMT	McAtee 32'; Connell (yellow card) 66'; Kane 70' (yellow card) 81'; Cotter (yellow card) 90+7'	Report	James-Wildin 4'; Butler (yellow card) 67'	Stadium: Oakwell; Attendance: 12,525; Referee: Marc Edwards

26 December 2023 24	Stevenage	3–0	Northampton Town	Stevenage
15:00 GMT	Reid 2'; Roberts 42'; List 67'	Report	Sowerby (yellow card) 52'	Stadium: Broadhall Way; Attendance: 5,164; Referee: Will Finnie

1 January 2024 26	Portsmouth	2–1	Stevenage	Portsmouth
15:00 GMT	Lane 12'; Bishop 33'; Pack (yellow card) 62'; Rafferty (yellow card) 86'; Norris (yellow card) 90+1'	Report	L. Thompson (yellow card) 11', (goal) 26'; Sweeney (yellow card) 35'; Freeman (yellow card) 42'; Roberts (yellow card) 57'; Piergianni (yellow card) 72'; N. Thompson (yellow card) 88', (red card) 90+6'	Stadium: Fratton Park; Attendance: 18,891; Referee: Charles Breakspear

13 January 2024 28	Shrewsbury Town	0–1	Stevenage	Shrewsbury
15:00 GMT	Kenneh (yellow card) 67'	Report	Vancooten (yellow card) 55'; Reid 84'; Forster-Caskey (yellow card) 90+1'	Stadium: New Meadow; Attendance: 5,259; Referee: Thomas Kirk

27 January 2024 30	Wigan Athletic	2–3	Stevenage	Wigan
15:00 GMT	Magennis 5' (pen.), (yellow card) 68'; Aasgaard 38'; Shaw (yellow card) 54'; Jones (yellow card) 55'; Humphrys (yellow card) 90+4'	Report	Reid 15'; Burns (yellow card) 55'; Piergianni (yellow card) 62', (goal) 66'; Thompson 81'; Freeman (yellow card) 82'; Roberts (yellow card) 83'	Stadium: DW Stadium; Attendance: 8,804; Referee: Ben Toner

3 February 2024 31	Stevenage	1–0	Blackpool	Stevenage
15:00 GMT	Butler (yellow card) 74'; Forster-Caskey 85'; Piergianni (yellow card) 89'	Report	Kouassi (yellow card) 45'; Dembélé (yellow card) 79'; Husband (yellow card) 85'	Stadium: Broadhall Way; Attendance: 5,014; Referee: Simon Mather

6 February 2024 27	Stevenage	0–1	Reading	Stevenage
19:45 GMT		Report	Savage (yellow card) 24'; Mola (yellow card) 39'; Oliver 45' (o.g.); Knibbs (yellow card) 89'; Ehibhatiomhan (yellow card) 90+4'	Stadium: Broadhall Way; Attendance: 3,947; Referee: Paul Howard
Note: Fixture was originally scheduled for 6 January, but was postponed due to FA Cup involvement.

10 February 2024 32	Port Vale	2–2	Stevenage	Burslem
15:00 GMT	Vancooten 6' (o.g.); Lowe (yellow card) 28'; Mighten (yellow card) 82'; Sang (yellow card) 89'; Ojo 90+8' (pen.)	Report	Piergianni (yellow card) 33'; Forster-Caskey (yellow card) 36'; Reid 52'; Vancooten 58'; MacGillivray (yellow card) 90+3'; Butler (yellow card) 90+7'	Stadium: Vale Park; Attendance: 5,296; Referee: Scott Tallis

13 February 2024 33	Stevenage	2–3	Bristol Rovers	Stevenage
19:45 GMT	Hemmings 6'; Forster-Caskey 24'	Report	Evans (yellow card) 21', (goal) 67'; Thomas 29'; Martin 62'; Conteh (yellow card) 86' (yellow-red card) 90+5'	Stadium: Broadhall Way; Attendance: 3,231; Referee: Sunny Sukhvir Gill

17 February 2024 34	Derby County	1–0	Stevenage	Derby
15:00 GMT	Sibley 90'	Report	Forster-Caskey (yellow card) 62'; Ashby-Hammond (yellow card) 84'	Stadium: Pride Park Stadium; Attendance: 27,055; Referee: Tom Reeves

24 February 2024 35	Stevenage	1–0	Wycombe Wanderers	Stevenage
15:00 GMT	Piergianni 23'; Ashby-Hammond (yellow card) 81'	Report	Lonwijk (yellow card) 7'; Stryjek (red card) 48'	Stadium: Broadhall Way; Attendance: 4,660; Referee: Darren Drysdale

27 February 2024 25	Stevenage	1–0	Cambridge United	Stevenage
19:45 GMT	Roberts 35'; Forster-Caskey (yellow card) 45'; Reid (yellow card) 66'	Report	Cousins (yellow card) 43'	Stadium: Broadhall Way; Attendance: 6,553; Referee: Alex Chilowicz
Note: Fixture was originally scheduled for 29 December, but was postponed due to a local area power cut.

2 March 2024 36	Lincoln City	0–0	Stevenage	Lincoln
15:00 GMT	House (yellow card) 33'; Erhahon (yellow card) 37'	Report	Reid (yellow card) 27'; Vancooten (yellow card) 75'; Freeman (yellow card) 90+5'	Stadium: Sincil Bank; Attendance: 8,129; Referee: Bobby Madley

9 March 2024 37	Stevenage	0–0	Fleetwood Town	Stevenage
15:00 GMT	Thompson (yellow card) 28'	Report	Holgate (yellow card) 21' (yellow-red card) 68'; Rooney (yellow card) 75'; Stockley (yellow card) 85'	Stadium: Lamex Stadium; Attendance: 3,911; Referee: Adam Herczeg

13 March 2024 38	Peterborough United	3–1	Stevenage	Peterborough
20:00 GMT	Kyprianou (yellow card) 33'; Burrows 44' (pen.); Katongo 64'; Poku 77'	Report	Freeman 85'	Stadium: London Road Stadium; Attendance: 7,504; Referee: Carl Brook
Note: Fixture was initially scheduled for 12 March, but was moved for live Sky Sports broadcast.

16 March 2024 39	Stevenage	0–1	Leyton Orient	Stevenage
15:00 GMT	Vancooten (yellow card) 77'	Report	Sanders 16'; Pratley (yellow card) 44'; Forde (yellow card) 83'	Stadium: Broadhall Way; Attendance: 5,650; Referee: Craig Hicks

23 March 2024 40	Carlisle United	2–2	Stevenage	Carlisle
15:00 GMT	Butterworth 13', 65', (yellow card) 72'; Charters (yellow card) 45+2'; Neal (yellow card) 67'; Lewis (yellow card) 77'	Report	Freeman (yellow card) 29'; Roberts (yellow card) 39'; MacDonald 82' (pen.); Vancooten 90+6'	Stadium: Brunton Park; Attendance: 7,634; Referee: Daniel Middleton

29 March 2024 41	Stevenage	0–0	Bolton Wanderers	Stevenage
15:00 GMT		Report	Sheehan (yellow card) 75'; Maghoma (yellow card) 76'	Stadium: Broadhall Way; Referee: Sam Allison

1 April 2024 42	Charlton Athletic	0–0	Stevenage	Charlton
15:00 BST	Watson (yellow card) 43'	Report	Thompson (yellow card) 22'; White (yellow card) 88'	Stadium: The Valley; Attendance: 14,351; Referee: Scott Oldham

6 April 2024 43	Exeter City	1–0	Stevenage	Exeter
15:00 BST	Carroll (yellow card) 22'; Cole 38'; Watts (yellow card) 69'; Sweeney (yellow card) 90+3'	Report	Butler (yellow card) 7'; L. Thompson (yellow card) 47'; Hemmings (yellow card) 69'; N. Thompson (yellow card) 86'	Stadium: St James Park; Attendance: 6,314; Referee: Lewis Smith

9 April 2024 29	Stevenage	2–1	Barnsley	Stevenage
19:45 BST	Reid 45+2'; Butler 51'; List (yellow card) 75'; Thompson (yellow card) 85'	Report	De Gevigney (yellow card) 12'; Phillips 30'; McCart (yellow card) 51'	Stadium: Broadhall Way; Attendance: 4,727; Referee: Declan Bourne
Note: Fixture was originally scheduled for 20 January, but was postponed due to a frozen pitch.

13 April 2024 44	Stevenage	1–2	Burton Albion	Stevenage
15:00 BST	Butler (red card) 61'; Thompson (yellow card) 75'; Hemmings 88', (yellow card) 90+4'	Report	Oshilaja (yellow card) 21'; Helm 45+1', (yellow card) 61'; Hamer (yellow card) 71', (goal) 76'	Stadium: Broadhall Way; Attendance: 4,040; Referee: Ben Toner

19 April 2024 45	Oxford United	1–1	Stevenage	Oxford
20:00 BST	Brannagan 59' (pen.)	Report	Vancooten (yellow card) 10'; Long 32' (o.g.); Guinness-Walker (yellow card) 71'; Smith (yellow card) 88'	Stadium: Kassam Stadium; Attendance: 9,174; Referee: Tom Nield
Note: Fixture was initially scheduled for 20 April, but was moved for live Sky Sports coverage.

27 April 2024 46	Stevenage	2–1	Cheltenham Town	Stevenage
15:00 BST	Hemmings 45+1' (pen.); Roberts (yellow card) 50'; Thompson (yellow card) 74'; Freeman 90'	Report	Nuttall (yellow card) 45+3'; Thomas (yellow card) 51'; Taylor 53'; Shepherd (yellow card) 84'	Stadium: Broadhall Way; Attendance: 5,441; Referee: Lee Swabey

=== FA Cup ===
Stevenage were drawn at home to Tranmere Rovers in the first round and to either Port Vale or Burton Albion in the second round. On 14 November, Port Vale won their replay 2–0 and were confirmed as the next opponents.

Win Draw Loss Fixtures

4 November 2023 First round	Stevenage	4–3	Tranmere Rovers	Stevenage
15:00 GMT	Roberts 3'; Butler (yellow card) 37'; Reid 58' (pen.), 90+10'; Hemmings 81' (yellow card) 88'	Report	Norris 28' (pen.); Merrie (yellow card) 38'; Apter 55'; Walker (yellow card) 67'; Morris 90+1'	Stadium: Broadhall Way; Attendance: 2,404; Referee: Neil Hair

2 December 2023 Second round	Stevenage	1–1	Port Vale	Stevenage
15:00 GMT	Ashby-Hammond (yellow card) 64'; Reid 69' (yellow card) 80'; Piergianni (yellow card) 81'; James-Wildin (yellow card) 90+3'	Report	Ojo 76' (pen.); Loft (yellow card) 78'; Ikpeazu (yellow card) 81'; Lowe (yellow card) 90+6'	Stadium: Broadhall Way; Attendance: 2,491; Referee: Tom Reeves

12 December 2023 Second round replay	Port Vale	3–3 (a.e.t.) (3–4 p)	Stevenage	Burslem
19:45 GMT	Garrity 6', 55' (yellow card) 106'; Iacovitti (yellow card) 69'; Ripley (yellow card) 90'; Loft 114'	Report	L. Thompson (yellow card) 50'; N. Thompson (yellow card) 50' (goal) 119'; White 81'; Hemmings 90+6'	Stadium: Vale Park; Attendance: 2,073; Referee: Tom Nield
	Penalties
	Ojo (penalty scored); Garrity (penalty missed); Lowe (penalty scored); Sang (penalty scored); Loft (penalty missed)		Reid (penalty scored); Hemmings (penalty scored); White (penalty scored); N. Thompson (penalty scored); James-Wildin (penalty missed)

6 January 2024 Third round	Maidstone United	1–0	Stevenage	Maidstone
12:30 GMT	Corne 45+2' (pen.); Bone (yellow card) 63'	Report	Sweeney (yellow card) 14'; Thompson (yellow card) 42'; Freeman (yellow card) 48'; Piergianni (yellow card) 78'	Stadium: Gallagher Stadium; Attendance: 4,024; Referee: Steve Martin

=== EFL Cup ===
Stevenage were drawn at home to Watford in the first round and away to Exeter City in the second round.

Win Draw Loss Fixtures

8 August 2023 First round	Stevenage	1–1 (4–3 p)	Watford	Stevenage
19:45 BST	March 43'	Report	Bayo 6'	Stadium: Broadhall Way; Attendance: 4,495; Referee: Charles Breakspear
	Penalties
	Reid (penalty missed); Roberts (penalty scored); Forster-Caskey (penalty scored); MacDonald (penalty scored); Thompson (penalty scored)		(penalty scored) Hoedt; (penalty scored) Sierralta; (penalty missed) Porteous; (penalty missed) Healey; (penalty scored) Koné

29 August 2023 Second round	Exeter City	1–1 (5–3 p)	Stevenage	Exeter
19:45 BST	Hartridge 5'; Trevitt (yellow card) 8'; Sweeney (yellow card) 30'	Report	Butler (yellow card) 63'; Roberts 69'; Thompson (yellow card) 89'	Stadium: St James Park; Referee: Andrew Kitchen
	Penalties
	Trevitt (penalty scored); Carroll (penalty scored); Aimson (penalty scored); Taylor (penalty scored); Sweeney (penalty scored)		Reid (penalty scored); Roberts (penalty scored); Butler (penalty missed); Sweeney (penalty scored)

=== EFL Trophy ===
Stevenage were drawn into Southern Group C, alongside AFC Wimbledon, Wycombe Wanderers and Crystal Palace U21.

Pos	Div	Team	Pld	W	PW	PL	L	GF	GA	GD	Pts	Qualification
1	L1	Wycombe Wanderers	3	3	0	0	0	3	0	+3	9	Advance to Round 2
2	L2	AFC Wimbledon	3	1	1	0	1	3	2	+1	5	Advance to Round 2
3	L1	Stevenage	3	1	0	1	1	6	4	+2	4	
4	ACA	Crystal Palace U21	3	0	0	0	3	2	8	−6	0	

Updated to match(es) played on 14 November 2023. Source: EFL.com

Win Draw Loss Fixtures

5 September 2023 Group stage	AFC Wimbledon	1–1 (6–5 p)	Stevenage	Wimbledon
19:00 BST	Pell (yellow card) 14'; Davison (yellow card) 33'; Lewis 71'; Lock (yellow card) 90'	Report	MacDonald (yellow card) 40'; Neal (yellow card) 46'; Reid 55' (pen.); Forster-Caskey (yellow card) 75'; Thompson (yellow card) 88'	Stadium: Plough Lane; Attendance: 1,317; Referee: Stephen Parkinson
	Penalties
	Sasu (penalty scored); Ball (penalty scored); Brown (penalty scored); Ogundere (penalty scored); Tilley (penalty scored); Lakin (penalty scored)		Reid (penalty scored); Hemmings (penalty scored); MacDonald (penalty scored); Forster-Caskey (penalty scored); Thompson (penalty scored); Freeman (penalty missed)

10 October 2023 Group stage	Stevenage	0–1	Wycombe Wanderers	Stevenage
19:00 BST	Thompson (yellow card) 69'	Report	Vokes 70'	Stadium: Broadhall Way; Attendance: 902; Referee: Daniel Middleton

14 November 2023 Group stage	Stevenage	5–2	Crystal Palace U21	Stevenage
19:00 GMT	Sheridan 5' (o.g.); Forster-Caskey 13'; White 22'; Neal (yellow card) 24'; Pressley 54', 83'; James-Wildin (yellow card) 57'; List (yellow card) 89'	Report	Ebiowei 17'; Ola-Adebomi 20'; Watson (yellow card) 85'	Stadium: Broadhall Way; Referee: Daniel Middleton
