= Lois Maynard =

Saint Kitts and Nevis association footballer

Personal information
- Full name: Lois Paul Maynard
- Date of birth: 22 January 1989 (age 37)
- Place of birth: Cheetham Hill, England
- Height: 6 ft 3 in (1.91 m)
- Positions: Central defender; central midfielder

Team information
- Current team: Radcliffe
- Number: 6

Senior career*
Years	Team	Apps	(Gls)
2007–2009	Daisy Hill		
2009–2011	Chadderton		
2011–2012	Flixton	32	(0)
2012	→ Stocksbridge Park Steels (loan)	0	(0)
2012–2013	Winsford United	39	(3)
2013–2015	FC Halifax Town	85	(18)
2015–2017	Tranmere Rovers	68	(5)
2017–2020	Salford City	94	(8)
2020–2022	Stockport County	22	(1)
2021–2022	→ Solihull Moors (loan)	30	(2)
2022–2023	Oldham Athletic	9	(0)
2023–	Radcliffe	53	(5)

International career^{‡}
2015–	Saint Kitts and Nevis	30	(0)
- * Club domestic league appearances and goals as of 21:20, 3 June 2023 (UTC) ‡ National team caps and goals as of 15:26, 11 June 2025

Lois Paul Maynard (born 22 January 1989) is a professional footballer who plays as a midfielder for Radcliffe. Mainly a central midfielder, he also can play as a central defender, right defender or defensive midfielder. Born in England, Maynard represents the Saint Kitts and Nevis national team.

== Career ==
Born in Cheetham Hill, Manchester, Maynard played for Daisy Hill and Chadderton before signing with Flixton in June 2011. He soon established himself as a key defensive unit, being also loaned to Stocksbridge Park Steels (two divisions above), but returning a week later.

In summer 2012, Maynard signed with Winsford United. After a good season he was invited to a trial at Rochdale's training ground. However, nothing came of it; and on 25 July 2013 he signed with FC Halifax Town. He scored a career-best 11 goals 2014–15 campaign, and signed a two-year deal with Tranmere Rovers on 28 May 2015.

In May 2017 he signed for Salford City. In May 2019 he extended his contract with the club until at least June 2020.

In February 2020 he signed for Stockport County. Maynard made his debut for Stockport in an 1–1 draw with Dagenham and Redbridge shortly before the 2019–20 season was cut short due to coronavirus. Over the extended summer period Maynard became a regular during the clubs preseason fixtures. Maynard scored his first goal for Stockport in a 5-2 victory over Wealdstone.

In the summer of 2022, Oldham Athletic confirmed the signing of Lois Maynard on a one-year contract. At the end of the season, he was released by the club.

Maynard signed for Northern Premier League Premier Division club Radcliffe on 1 July 2023.

== Personal life ==
Maynard is eligible to play for Saint Kitts and Nevis and has made a number of appearances for them. His cousin is Marcus Rashford of Manchester United F.C.

Alongside his football career, he works as a fitness coach and personal trainer.

== Honours ==
Salford City

- National League play-offs: 2019
