= 2020–21 Stevenage F.C. season =

Stevenage
2020–21 season
- Chairman: Phil Wallace
- Manager: Alex Revell
- Stadium: Broadhall Way
- League Two: 14th
- FA Cup: Third round
- EFL Cup: First round
- EFL Trophy: Group stage
- Top goalscorer: League: Elliott List (9); All: Elliott List (11)
Home colours	Away colours

The 2020–21 season was Stevenage's seventh consecutive season in League Two and their 45th year in existence. Along with competing in League Two, the club participated in the FA Cup, EFL Cup and EFL Trophy.

The club were in last place of League Two when the 2019–20 season was suspended due to the COVID-19 pandemic in March 2020. EFL clubs formally agreed to end the season during an EFL meeting on 9 June 2020, although "ongoing disciplinary matters" involving 23rd-placed Macclesfield Town, who had not paid their players on six separate occasions during the season, meant Stevenage might be reprieved. Stevenage were initially relegated from League Two after an independent disciplinary panel opted to deduct Macclesfield two points on 19 June, with a further four suspended, the maximum number they could deduct without relegating them. The EFL stated it would appeal against the independent disciplinary panel's sanctions on Macclesfield, winning their appeal against the points deduction on 11 August. This meant that the four suspended points were activated immediately and applied to the 2019–20 season, meaning Stevenage finished in 23rd-place and consequently retained their League Two status.

Stevenage's struggles continued into the 2020–21 season as the team were in last place with only two wins in their first 18 matches. However, from Boxing Day on, the club won 10 matches, drew nine times and only lost five games, finishing in 14th place in the league table.

== Transfers ==
=== Transfers in ===
Date	Position	Nationality	Name	From	Fee	Ref.
1 July 2020	CF	(England)	Femi Akinwande	(England) Billericay Town	Undisclosed	
1 July 2020	CF	(England)	Inih Effiong	(England) Dover Athletic	Free transfer	
1 July 2020	CM	(England)	Elliot Osborne	(England) Stockport County	Free transfer	
10 July 2020	CB	(England)	Ross Marshall	(England) Maidstone United	Free transfer	
22 July 2020	GK	(England)	Billy Johnson	(England) Norwich City	Free transfer	
24 July 2020	DM	(France)	Romain Vincelot	(England) Shrewsbury Town	Free transfer	
31 July 2020	CF	(England)	Tyrone Marsh	(England) Boreham Wood	Free transfer	
10 August 2020	CB	(England)	Luke Prosser	(England) Colchester United	Free transfer	
21 August 2020	CF	(England)	Marcus Dinanga	(England) Telford United	Free transfer	
16 October 2020	LB	(England)	Ben Coker	(England) Lincoln City	Undisclosed	
3 November 2020	LM	(England)	Tom Pett	(England) Lincoln City	Free transfer	
5 January 2021	CM	(England)	Chris Lines	(England) Northampton Town	Undisclosed	
5 January 2021	CF	(England)	Luke Norris	(England) Colchester United	Undisclosed	
21 January 2021	LW	(England)	Jacob Bancroft	(England) Oxford City	Undisclosed	
29 January 2021	LB	(England)	Joe Martin	(England) Northampton Town	Undisclosed	

=== Loans in ===
Date from	Position	Nationality	Name	From	Date until	Ref.
7 August 2020	LB	(England)	Ben Coker	(England) Lincoln City	16 October 2020 (Note: Joined on a permanent basis.)	
17 August 2020	GK	(England)	Jamie Cumming	(England) Chelsea	End of season	
26 August 2020	RB	(England)	Remeao Hutton	(England) Birmingham City	End of season	
10 September 2020	CM	(England)	Arthur Read	(England) Brentford	End of season	
6 October 2020	CF	(Scotland)	Jack Aitchison	(England) Barnsley	End of season	
16 October 2020	CF	(England)	Aramide Oteh	(England) Queens Park Rangers	18 January 2021	
5 January 2021	CF	(England)	Matty Stevens	(England) Forest Green Rovers	End of season	
1 February 2021	CM	(Cyprus)	Jack Roles	(England) Tottenham Hotspur	End of season	
2 February 2021	GK	(England)	David Stockdale	(England) Wycombe Wanderers	9 February 2021	

=== Loans out ===
Date from	Position	Nationality	Name	To	Date until	Ref.
1 October 2020	CB	(England)	Jamie Fielding	(England) Braintree Town	1 January 2021	
1 October 2020	CF	(Northern Ireland)	Liam Smyth	(England) Braintree Town	1 January 2021	
9 October 2020	CB	(England)	Luis Fernandez	(England) Oxford City	1 January 2021	
2 December 2020	CF	(England)	Inih Effiong	(England) Barnet	5 January 2021	
5 January 2021	CF	(England)	Marcus Dinanga	(England) Chesterfield	End of season	
7 January 2021	RW	(England)	Femi Akinwande	(England) Dartford	End of season	
11 January 2021	CF	(England)	Inih Effiong	(England) Notts County	2 April 2021	
21 January 2021	CB	(England)	Luis Fernandez	(England) Oxford City	28 February 2021	

=== Transfers out ===
Date	Position	Nationality	Name	To	Fee	Ref.
1 July 2020	GK	(France)	Sacha Bastien	(England) Gillingham	Released	
1 July 2020	CM	(England)	Joel Byrom	(England) Farsley Celtic	Released	
1 July 2020	RB	(Republic of Ireland)	Canice Carroll	(Scotland) Queen's Park	Released	
1 July 2020	CF	(Wales)	Jake Cassidy	(England) York City	Released	
1 July 2020	CF	(England)	Jason Cowley	(England) Bromsgrove Sporting	Released	
1 July 2020	DM	(France)	Diaguely Dabo	(Scotland) Kilmarnock	Released	
1 July 2020	LB	(England)	Tyler Denton	(England) Chesterfield	Released	
1 July 2020	CB	(England)	Paul Digby	(England) Cambridge United	Released	
1 July 2020	CB	(Egypt)	Adam El-Abd	(England) Whitehawk	Released	
1 July 2020	CF	(Cyprus)	Andronicos Georgiou	(England) Wycombe Wanderers	Released	
1 July 2020	CF	(Canada)	Simeon Jackson	(England) Chelmsford City	Released	
1 July 2020	MF	(England)	Jamie Jellis	(England) Aylesbury United	Released	
1 July 2020	CF	(England)	Ben Kennedy	(Northern Ireland) Crusaders	Released	
1 July 2020	CB	(England)	Ben Nugent	(England) Barnet	Released	
1 July 2020	CM	(England)	Dean Parrett	(England) Wealdstone	Released	
1 July 2020	LB	(Scotland)	Patrick Reading	(Scotland) Ayr United	Released	
1 July 2020	CF	(England)	Alex Reid	(England) Stockport County	Released	
1 July 2020	RW	(Australia)	Joel Rollinson	(England) Eastbourne Borough	Released	
1 July 2020	CM	(England)	Tom Soares	Unattached	Released	
1 July 2020	RW	(England)	Emmanuel Sonupe	(England) Yeovil Town	Released	
1 July 2020	CF	(England)	Paul Taylor	Unattached	Released	
17 August 2020	GK	(England)	Paul Farman	(England) Carlisle United	Free transfer	
19 September 2020	LM	(England)	Joe Leslie	(England) Woking	Free transfer	
4 February 2021	CF	(England)	Tyrone Marsh	(England) Boreham Wood	Undisclosed	
5 April 2021	CB	(England)	Jamie Fielding	(England) Wealdstone	Released	

== Pre-season ==
Win	Draw	Loss

Date	Opponent	Venue	Result (Note: Stevenage's score shown first)	Scorers	Attendance	Ref.
12 August 2020	Braintree Town	Home (Note: Match took place at Stevenage's training ground in Bragbury End)	5–1		0 (Note: Match played behind closed doors)	
18 August 2020	Milton Keynes Dons	Home	1–1		0	
22 August 2020	Luton Town	Home	0–1	—	0	

== Competitions ==
=== League Two ===
==== League table ====
Pos	Team	Pld	W	D	L	GF	GA	GD	Pts
10	Carlisle United	46	18	12	16	60	51	+9	66
11	Leyton Orient	46	17	10	19	53	55	−2	61
12	Crawley Town	46	16	13	17	56	62	−6	61
13	Port Vale	46	17	9	20	57	57	0	60
14	Stevenage	46	14	18	14	41	41	0	60
15	Bradford City	46	16	11	19	48	53	−5	59
16	Mansfield Town	46	13	19	14	57	55	+2	58
17	Harrogate Town	46	16	9	21	52	61	−9	57
18	Oldham Athletic	46	15	9	22	72	81	−9	54

Updated to match(es) played on 31 May 2021. Source: EFL Official Website
Rules for classification: 1) Points; 2) Goal difference; 3) Number of goals scored; 4) Head-to-head results; 5) Wins; 6) Away goals; 7) Penalty points (sec 9.5); 8) 12-point sending off offences

==== Results summary ====
Overall								Home						Away					
Pld	W	D	L	GF	GA	GD	Pts	W	D	L	GF	GA	GD	W	D	L	GF	GA	GD
45	13	18	14	40	41	−1	57	8	8	7	26	20	+6	5	10	7	14	21	−7

Last updated: 1 May 2021.
Source: BBC Sport

==== Results by matchday ====
Matchday	1	2	3	4	5	6	7	8	9	10	11	12	13	14	15	16	17	18	19	20	21	22	23	24	25	26	27	28	29	30	31	32	33	34	35	36	37	38	39	40	41	42	43	44	45
Ground	A	H	A	H	A	A	H	H	A	H	A	A	H	H	A	H	A	A	H	H	H	A	H	A	H	H	A	A	A	H	A	A	H	H	A	A	H	H	A	H	A	H	H	A	H
Result	D	W	L	L	D	L	L	L	D	D	L	D	L	W	D	D	L	D	W	W	D	L	D	W	L	D	W	L	W	D	D	D	W	W	D	D	W	W	W	D	L	L	L	W	D
Position	11	5	11	16	15	17	18	20	20	21	21	22	23	21	23	22	23	24	23	22	22	22	22	21	21	21	21	21	21	21	20	18	16	15	15	15	15	13	12	13	14	15	16	15	15

Updated to match(es) played on 1 May 2021. Source: Statto.com
A = Away; H = Home; W = Win; D = Draw; L = Loss

==== Matches ====
The 2020–21 season fixtures were released on 21 August.

Win	Draw	Loss

Date	Time	Opponent	Venue	Result	Scorers	Attendance	Referee	Ref.
12 September 2020	15:00	Barrow	Away	1–1	Effiong 85' (pen.)	0	Scott Oldham	
19 September 2020	15:00	Oldham Athletic	Home	3–0	Osborne 61', Wildin 65', Prosser 82'	0	Charles Breakspear	
26 September 2020	15:00	Bradford City	Away	1–2	List 37'	0	Ollie Yates	
3 October 2020	15:00	Salford City	Home	0–1		0	Craig Hicks	
10 October 2020	15:00	Mansfield Town	Away	0–0		0	Seb Stockbridge	
17 October 2020	15:00	Forest Green Rovers	Away	0–1		0	James Bell	
20 October 2020	19:00	Newport County	Home	0–1		0	Lee Swabey	
24 October 2020	15:00	Leyton Orient	Home	0–2		0	Darren Drysdale	
27 October 2020	19:00	Harrogate Town	Away	0–0		0	Graham Salisbury	
31 October 2020	15:00	Grimsby Town	Home	0–0		0	Sam Allison	
3 November 2020	19:00	Colchester United	Away	1–3	Dinanga 15'	0	James Adcock	
14 November 2020	15:00	Morecambe	Away	1–1	Oteh 27' (pen.)	0	Tom Nield	
21 November 2020	15:00	Bolton Wanderers	Home	1–2	Pett 44'	0	Will Finnie	
24 November 2020	15:00	Port Vale	Home	2–1	Oteh 10', Newton 53'	0	Paul Howard	
2 December 2020	19:00	Walsall	Away	1–1	Oteh 50' (pen.)	0	Marc Edwards	
5 December 2020	15:00	Southend United	Home	0–0		0	Declan Bourne	
12 December 2020	15:00	Carlisle United	Away	0–4		2,000	Robert Lewis	
26 December 2020	15:00	Cheltenham Town	Away	1–1	Aitchison 80'	0	Chris Sarginson	
29 December 2020	17:00	Cambridge United	Home	1–0	Carter 22'	0	Thomas Bramall	
2 January 2021	15:00	Scunthorpe United	Home	3–1	Carter (2) 11', 22', Oteh 90+2'	0	Christopher Pollard	
16 January 2021	15:00	Tranmere Rovers	Home	0–0		0	Lee Swabey	
23 January 2021	13:00	Exeter City	Away	1–3	List 81'	0	Matt Donohue	
26 January 2021	15:00	Colchester United	Home	0–0		0	Paul Howard	
30 January 2021	15:00	Grimsby Town	Away	2–1	List 42', Stevens 90+5'	0	Anthony Backhouse	
2 February 2021	19:00	Exeter City	Home	0–1		0	Graham Salisbury	
6 February 2021	15:00	Morecambe	Home	2–2	List 8', Norris 81'	0	James Oldham	
9 February 2021	19:00	Tranmere Rovers	Away	1–0	Newton 82'	0	Bobby Madley	
13 February 2021	15:00	Bolton Wanderers	Away	0–1		0	Trevor Kettle	
16 February 2021	19:00	Crawley Town	Away	1–0	Osborne 83'	0	Carl Brook	
20 February 2021	15:00	Walsall	Home	1–1	List 70'	0	Antony Coggins	
23 February 2021	19:00	Port Vale	Away	0–0		0	Martin Coy	
27 February 2021	15:00	Newport County	Away	0–0		0	James Bell	
2 March 2021	19:00	Forest Green Rovers	Home	3–0	Newton (2) 30', 37', List 64'	0	Kevin Johnson	
6 March 2021	15:00	Harrogate Town	Home	1–0	List 52'	0	Scott Oldham	
9 March 2021	19:00	Leyton Orient	Away	0–0		0	Alan Young	
13 March 2021	15:00	Southend United	Away	0–0		0	Peter Wright	
13 March 2021	15:00	Carlisle United	Home	3–1	Pett 23', Norris 60', Read 71'	0	Brett Huxtable	
27 March 2021	15:00	Barrow	Home	2–1	List 53', Norris 87' (pen.)	0	James Adcock	
2 April 2021	15:00	Oldham Athletic	Away	1–0	Cuthbert 24'	0	Ben Toner	
5 April 2021	15:00	Bradford City	Home	1–1	Norris 15'	0	Carl Boyeson	
10 April 2021	15:00	Salford City	Away	1–2	Wildin 56'	0	Andy Haines	
17 April 2021	12:30	Mansfield Town	Home	0–1		0	Samuel Barrott	
20 April 2021	19:00	Cheltenham Town	Home	0–1		0	Trevor Kettle	
24 April 2021	15:00	Cambridge United	Away	1–0	Norris 63'	0	Ross Joyce	
1 May 2021	15:00	Crawley Town	Home	3–3	Norris (2) 21' (pen.), 74', Read 81'	0	Declan Bourne	
8 May 2021	15:00	Scunthorpe United	Away	0–1	List 59'	0	Ollie Yates	

=== FA Cup ===
The draw for the first round was made on Monday 26, October. The second round draw was revealed on Monday, 9 November by Danny Cowley. The third round draw was made on 30 November, with Premier League and EFL Championship clubs all entering the competition.

Win	Draw	Loss

Round	Date	Time	Opponent	Venue	Result	Scorers	Attendance	Referee	Ref.
First round	8 November 2020	15:00	Concord Rangers	Home	2–2 (a.e.t.) (5–4 p)	Coker 28', Newton 99'	0	John Busby	
Second round	29 November 2020	13:30	Hull City	Home	1–1 (a.e.t.) (6–5 p)	List 79'	0	Sam Allison	
Third round	9 January 2021	15:00	Swansea City	Home	0–2		0	Michael Salisbury	

=== EFL Cup ===
The first round draw was made on 18 August, live on Sky Sports, by Paul Merson.

Win	Draw	Loss

Round	Date	Time	Opponent	Venue	Result	Scorers	Attendance	Referee	Ref.
First round	29 August 2020	15:00	Portsmouth	Home	3–3; 1–3 pens.	List 9', Carter 10', Cuthbert 29'	0	Purkiss	

=== EFL Trophy ===
The regional group stage draw was confirmed on 18 August.

Pos	Div	Team	Pld	W	PW	PL	L	GF	GA	GD	Pts	Qualification
1	L1	Milton Keynes Dons	3	2	0	0	1	7	5	+2	6	Advance to Round 2
2	L1	Northampton Town	3	1	1	0	1	6	3	+3	5	Advance to Round 2
3	L2	Stevenage	3	1	0	1	1	4	4	0	4	
4	ACA	Southampton U21	3	1	0	0	2	3	8	−5	3	

Source: EFL.com

Win	Draw	Loss

Round	Date	Time	Opponent	Venue	Result	Scorers	Attendance	Referee	Ref.
Group stage	22 September 2020	19:00	Southampton U21	Home	2–1	Dinanga 45+3', Marsh 90+2'	0	Alan Young	
Group stage	6 October 2020	17:30	Milton Keynes Dons	Home	2–3	Thompson 45+1' (o.g.), Effiong 66' (pen.)	0	Carl Brook	
Group stage	17 November 2020	19:00	Northampton Town	Away	0–0; 2–4 pens.		0	Chris Sarginson	

== Statistics ==
=== Appearances and goals ===
Last updated 11 May 2021.

No.	Pos	Nat	Player	Total		EFL League Two		EFL Cup		EFL Trophy		FA Cup	
No.	Pos	Nat	Player	Apps	Goals	Apps	Goals	Apps	Goals	Apps	Goals	Apps	Goals
Goalkeepers
1	GK	(England) ENG	Jamie Cumming	47	0	41	0	1	0	2	0	3	0
13	GK	(England) ENG	Billy Johnson	1	0	0	0	0	0	1	0	0	0
37	GK	(England) ENG	David Stockdale (loan expired)	5	0	5	0	0	0	0	0	0	0
Defenders
2	DF	(Antigua and Barbuda) ANT	Luther James-Wildin	43	2	39	2	1	0	1	0	2	0
3	DF	(England) ENG	Ben Coker	43	1	38	0	1	0	1	0	3	1
5	DF	(Scotland) SCO	Scott Cuthbert	37	2	33	1	1	1	1	0	2	0
6	DF	(England) ENG	Luke Prosser	34	1	30	1	1	0	1	0	2	0
12	DF	(England) ENG	Remeao Hutton	31	0	26	0	1	0	3	0	1	0
14	DF	(England) ENG	Jamie Fielding (transferred out)	0	0	0	0	0	0	0	0	0	0
15	DF	(Guyana) GUY	Terence Vancooten	33	0	29	0	0	0	2	0	2	0
18	DF	(England) ENG	Mackye Townsend-West	1	0	0	0	0	0	1	0	0	0
24	DF	(England) ENG	Ross Marshall	19	0	15	0	0	0	3	0	1	0
28	DF	(England) ENG	Joe Martin	14	0	14	0	0	0	0	0	0	0
30	DF	(England) ENG	Luis Fernandez	2	0	1	0	0	0	1	0	0	0
Midfielders
4	MF	(France) FRA	Romain Vincelot	31	0	26	0	1	0	2	0	2	0
7	MF	(England) ENG	Charlie Carter	23	4	18	3	1	1	1	0	3	0
8	MF	(England) ENG	Elliot Osborne	30	2	26	2	1	0	2	0	1	0
16	MF	(England) ENG	Arthur Iontton	4	0	2	0	0	0	1	0	1	0
17	MF	(England) ENG	Elliott List	48	11	44	9	1	1	1	0	2	1
19	MF	(England) ENG	Arthur Read	38	2	32	2	0	0	3	0	3	0
23	MF	(England) ENG	Jack Smith	30	0	25	0	0	0	3	0	2	0
26	MF	(England) ENG	Tom Pett	34	2	31	2	0	0	0	0	3	0
31	MF	(England) ENG	Alfie Williams	1	0	1	0	0	0	0	0	0	0
32	MF	(England) ENG	Yasin Arai	0	0	0	0	0	0	0	0	0	0
34	MF	(England) ENG	Max Granville	0	0	0	0	0	0	0	0	0	0
38	MF	(Cyprus) CYP	Jack Roles	2	0	2	0	0	0	0	0	0	0
40	MF	(England) ENG	Chris Lines	21	0	20	0	0	0	0	0	1	0
44	MF	(England) ENG	Finlay Johnson	0	0	0	0	0	0	0	0	0	0
Forwards
9	FW	(England) ENG	Inih Effiong	13	2	9	1	1	0	2	1	1	0
10	FW	(England) ENG	Tyrone Marsh (transferred out)	14	1	10	0	1	0	2	1	1	0
11	FW	(England) ENG	Danny Newton	41	5	35	4	1	0	2	0	3	1
20	FW	(England) ENG	Femi Akinwande	11	0	7	0	1	0	3	0	0	0
22	FW	(England) ENG	Marcus Dinanga (out on loan)	9	2	6	1	0	0	2	1	1	0
25	FW	(England) ENG	Sam Tinubu	0	0	0	0	0	0	0	0	0	0
27	FW	(Scotland) SCO	Jack Aitchison	27	1	26	1	0	0	0	0	1	0
28	FW	(England) ENG	Aramide Oteh (loan expired)	16	4	13	4	0	0	0	0	3	0
29	FW	(Northern Ireland) NIR	Liam Smyth	0	0	0	0	0	0	0	0	0	0
35	FW	(England) ENG	Matty Stevens	18	1	18	1	0	0	0	0	0	0
36	FW	(England) ENG	Luke Norris	24	7	23	7	0	0	0	0	1	0
39	FW	(England) ENG	Jahmal Hector-Ingram (loan expired)	1	0	1	0	0	0	0	0	0	0
41	FW	(England) ENG	Harry Draper	0	0	0	0	0	0	0	0	0	0
	FW	(England) ENG	Jacob Bancroft	0	0	0	0	0	0	0	0	0	0

=== Top scorers ===
Includes all competitive matches. The list is sorted by squad number when total goals are equal.

Last updated 11 May 2021.

Rank	Position	Nationality	No.	Player	EFL League Two	EFL Cup	EFL Trophy	FA Cup	Total
1	MF	(England)	17	Elliott List	9	1	0	1	11
2	FW	(England)	36	Luke Norris	7	0	0	0	7
3	FW	(England)	11	Danny Newton	4	0	0	1	5
4	MF	(England)	7	Charlie Carter	3	1	0	0	4
4	FW	(England)	28	Aramide Oteh	4	0	0	0	4
5	DF	(Antigua and Barbuda)	2	Luther James-Wildin	2	0	0	0	2
5	DF	(Scotland)	5	Scott Cuthbert	1	1	0	0	2
5	MF	(England)	8	Elliot Osborne	2	0	0	0	2
5	FW	(England)	9	Inih Effiong	1	0	1	0	2
5	MF	(England)	19	Arthur Read	2	0	0	0	2
5	FW	(England)	22	Marcus Dinanga	1	0	1	0	2
5	MF	(England)	26	Tom Pett	2	0	0	0	2
6	DF	(England)	3	Ben Coker	0	0	0	1	1
6	DF	(England)	6	Luke Prosser	1	0	0	0	1
6	FW	(England)	10	Tyrone Marsh	0	0	1	0	1
6	FW	(Scotland)	27	Jack Aitchison	1	0	0	0	1
6	FW	(England)	35	Matty Stevens	1	0	0	0	1
	Own goals				0	0	1	0	0
	TOTALS				41	3	4	3	51

=== Clean sheets ===
Includes all competitive matches. The list is sorted by squad number when total clean sheets are equal.

Last updated 11 May 2021.

Rank	Position	Nationality	No.	Player	EFL League Two	EFL Cup	EFL Trophy	FA Cup	Total
1
1	GK	(England)	1	Jamie Cumming	17	0	1	0	18
2
2	GK	(England)	37	David Stockdale	2	0	0	0	2
TOTALS					19	0	1	0	20

=== Disciplinary record ===
Includes all competitive matches.

Last updated 11 May 2021.

Position	Nationality	Number	Name	League Two		EFL Cup		EFL Trophy		FA Cup		Total	
Position	Nationality	Number	Name	Booked	Sent off (straight red)	Booked	Sent off (straight red)	Booked	Sent off (straight red)	Booked	Sent off (straight red)	Booked	Sent off (straight red)
DF	(England)	6	Luke Prosser	6	1	0	0	0	0	0	0	6	1
FW	(England)	11	Danny Newton	8	0	0	0	0	0	1	0	9	0
MF	(France)	4	Romain Vincelot	5	0	0	0	2	0	1	0	8	0
DF	(England)	3	Ben Coker	7	0	0	0	0	0	0	0	7	0
DF	(Guyana)	15	Terence Vancooten	5	0	0	0	1	0	0	0	6	0
DF	(England)	12	Remeao Hutton	4	0	0	0	0	0	1	0	5	0
MF	(England)	19	Arthur Read	4	0	0	0	0	0	1	0	5	0
DF	(Antigua and Barbuda)	2	Luther James-Wildin	3	0	0	0	1	0	0	0	4	0
MF	(England)	26	Tom Pett	3	0	0	0	0	0	0	0	3	0
FW	(England)	28	Aramide Oteh	3	0	0	0	0	0	0	0	3	0
MF	(England)	8	Elliot Osborne	2	0	0	0	0	0	0	0	2	0
MF	(England)	16	Arthur Iontton	1	0	0	0	1	0	0	0	2	0
MF	(England)	17	Elliott List	2	0	0	0	0	0	0	0	2	0
MF	(England)	28	Joe Martin	2	0	0	0	0	0	0	0	2	0
MF	(England)	40	Chris Lines	2	0	0	0	0	0	0	0	2	0
DF	(Scotland)	5	Scott Cuthbert	1	0	0	0	0	0	0	0	1	0
FW	(England)	20	Femi Akinwande	1	0	0	0	0	0	0	0	1	0
FW	(England)	35	Matty Stevens	1	0	0	0	0	0	0	0	1	0
FW	(England)	36	Luke Norris	1	0	0	0	0	0	0	0	1	0
			TOTALS	62	1	0	0	5	0	4	0	71	1
