= 2019–20 Stevenage F.C. season =

Stevenage F.C.
2019–20 season
- Chairman: Phil Wallace
- Manager: Dino Maamria (until 9 September); Graham Westley (between 15 December – 16 February); Alex Revell (from 16 February)
- Stadium: Broadhall Way
- League Two: 23rd
- FA Cup: First round
- EFL Cup: First round
- EFL Trophy: Quarter-finals
- Top goalscorer: League: Charlie Carter; Kurtis Guthrie (5 each); All: Charlie Carter (6)
Home colours	Away colours

The 2019–20 season was Stevenage's sixth consecutive season in League Two and their 44th year in existence. Along with competing in League Two, the club participated in the FA Cup, EFL Cup and EFL Trophy.

Following a winless start to the season, manager Dino Maamria was sacked in September 2019. First-team coach Mark Sampson assumed control of the team in a Caretaker role, overseeing the club for 14 games. With the club in 23rd-position, Graham Westley returned as manager, his fourth spell at the club. Westley resigned in February 2020 and was replaced by player Alex Revell.

The club were in last place of League Two when the season was suspended due to the COVID-19 pandemic in March 2020. EFL clubs formally agreed to end the season during an EFL meeting on 9 June 2020, although "ongoing disciplinary matters" involving 23rd-placed Macclesfield Town, who had not paid their players on six separate occasions during the season, meant Stevenage might be reprieved. Stevenage were initially relegated from League Two after an independent disciplinary panel opted to deduct Macclesfield two points on 19 June, with a further four suspended, the maximum number they could deduct without relegating them, highlighting this as a key factor in the sanctions they had chosen to impose. The EFL stated it would appeal against the independent disciplinary panel's sanctions on Macclesfield, winning their appeal against the points deduction on 11 August. This meant that the four suspended points were activated immediately and applied to the 2019–20 season, meaning Stevenage finished in 23rd-place and consequently retained their League Two status.

The season covers the period from 1 July 2019 to 30 June 2020.

== Pre-season ==
Stevenage confirmed their pre-season schedule in June 2019.

9 July 2019 Friendly	Wingate & Finchley	0–1	Stevenage	Finchley
19:45 BST		Report	Carter 14'	Stadium: The Maurice Rebak Stadium

10 July 2019 Friendly	Hitchin Town	0–3	Stevenage	Hitchin
19:45 BST		Report	Guthrie 14', 26'; Trialist 59'	Stadium: Top Field

13 July 2019 Friendly	St Albans City	0–0	Stevenage	St Albans
15:00 BST		Report		Stadium: Clarence Park

16 July 2019 Friendly	Stevenage	1–1	Peterborough United	Stevenage
19:45 BST	Sonupe 10'	Report	Eisa 72'	Stadium: Broadhall Way

20 July 2019 Friendly	Stevenage	0–1	Portsmouth	Stevenage
15:00 BST		Report	Curtis 65'	Stadium: Broadhall Way

23 July 2019 Friendly	Maidenhead United	1–0	Stevenage	Maidenhead
19:45 BST	Whitehall 58'	Report		Stadium: York Road

24 July 2019 Friendly	Cheshunt	1–2	Stevenage	Cheshunt
19:45 BST	21'		Smyth 42'; 49'	Stadium: Theobalds Lane

27 July 2019 Friendly	Stevenage	Cancelled	Gillingham	Stevenage
15:00 BST		Report		Stadium: Broadhall Way

== Competitions ==
=== League Two ===
==== League table ====
Pos	Team	Pld	W	D	L	GF	GA	GD	Pts	PPG	Promotion, qualification or relegation
17	Leyton Orient	36	10	12	14	47	55	−8	42	1.17	
18	Carlisle United	37	10	12	15	39	56	−17	42	1.14	
19	Oldham Athletic	37	9	14	14	44	57	−13	41	1.11	
20	Scunthorpe United	37	10	10	17	44	56	−12	40	1.08	
21	Mansfield Town	36	9	11	16	48	55	−7	38	1.06	
22	Morecambe	37	7	11	19	35	60	−25	32	0.86	
23	Stevenage	36	3	13	20	24	50	−26	22	0.61	Reprieved from relegation (Note: As a result of Bury's expulsion from League One, only one team is relegated to maintain League Two at 24 teams.)
24	Macclesfield Town (R)	37	7	15	15	32	47	−15	19 (Note: Macclesfield Town were deducted a total of 17 points for various infractions. They were deducted six points for failing to both pay their players' wages and to fulfil a fixture, reduced to four points after appeal. A further seven-point deduction was given for failing to play December's match against Plymouth Argyle. A further two-point deduction was given for breaches of regulations over non-payment of wages. On 3 July the EFL appealed against the independent disciplinary panel's sanctions, and a further four points were deducted on 11 August 2020, resulting in Macclesfield Town being relegated.)	0.51	Relegation to the National League

Source: EFL Official Website
Rules for classification: 1) Points per game; 2) Goal difference; 3) Number of goals scored; 4) Head-to-head results; 5) Wins; 6) Away goals; 7) Penalty points (sec 9.5); 8) 12-point sending off offences
(R) Relegated

==== Results summary ====
Overall								Home						Away					
Pld	W	D	L	GF	GA	GD	Pts	W	D	L	GF	GA	GD	W	D	L	GF	GA	GD
36	3	13	20	24	50	−26	22	2	6	9	10	22	−12	1	7	11	14	28	−14

Last updated: 7 March 2020.
Source: BBC Sport

==== Results by matchday ====
Matchday	1	2	3	4	5	6	7	8	9	10	11	12	13	14	15	16	17	18	19	20	21	22	23	24	25	26	27	28	29	30	31	32	33	34	35	36	37	38
Ground	A	H	A	H	A	H	A	H	H	A	H	A	H	A	A	H	A	A	H	A	H	H	A	A	H	H	H	A	H	A	H	A	A	H	A	A		
Result	L	L	D	L	D	D	L	L	L	D	D	L	W	D	L	W	D	D	D	D	L	D	L	L	D	L	D	W	L	L	L	L	L	L	L	L		
Position	23	23	22	22	23	23	23	24	24	24	24	24	23	24	24	23	23	23	23	23	24	24	24	24	23	24	24	23	24	24	24	24	24	24	24	24	24	24

Updated to match(es) played on 7 March 2020. Source: Statto.com
A = Away; H = Home; W = Win; D = Draw; L = Loss

==== Matches ====
On Thursday, 20 June 2019, the EFL League Two fixtures were revealed.

3 August 2019 1	Salford City	2–0	Stevenage	Salford
12:30 BST	Dieseruvwe 29', 48'; Towell (yellow card) 45+1'	Report		Stadium: Peninsula Stadium; Attendance: 3,416; Referee: Kevin Johnson
Note: Live on Sky Sports

10 August 2019 2	Stevenage	0–1	Exeter City	Stevenage
15:00 BST	Soares (yellow card) 72'	Report	Williams (yellow card) 12'; Collins (yellow card) 45+2'; Law 89'	Stadium: Broadhall Way; Attendance: 2,398; Referee: Antony Coggins

17 August 2019 3	Leyton Orient	0–0	Stevenage	Leyton
15:00 BST	Clay (yellow card) 45+2'	Report		Stadium: Brisbane Road; Attendance: 5,104; Referee: Lee Swabey

20 August 2019 4	Stevenage	0–1	Bradford City	Stevenage
19:45 BST		Report	Soares 42' (o.g.); Vaughan (yellow card) 48'; Akpan (yellow card) 83'	Stadium: Broadhall Way; Attendance: 2,833; Referee: Christopher Pollard

24 August 2019 5	Mansfield Town	0–0	Stevenage	Mansfield
15:00 BST		Report	Husin (yellow card) 37'; Stokes (yellow card) 85'	Stadium: Field Mill; Attendance: 3,982; Referee: Marc Edwards

31 August 2019 6	Stevenage	2–2	Macclesfield Town	Stevenage
15:00 BST	Byrom (yellow card) 56'; Guthrie 68'; Wildin 72'	Report	Stephens 27'; O'Keeffe (yellow card) 49'; Osadebe (yellow card) 72'; Ironside 85' (pen.)	Stadium: The Lamex Stadium; Attendance: 2,504; Referee: Scott Oldham

7 September 2019 7	Cheltenham Town	4–2	Stevenage	Cheltenham
15:00 BST	Reilly 22'; Long 57'; Broom 80'; Addai 90+1'	Report	Newton 48', 72'	Stadium: Jonny-Rocks Stadium; Attendance: 2,708; Referee: James Oldham

14 September 2019 8	Stevenage	2–3	Carlisle United	Stevenage
15:00 BST	Guthrie 25', 54'; Wildin (yellow card) 75'	Report	McKirdy 38', 83'; Thomas 52'; Knight-Percival (yellow card) 69'; Bridge (yellow card) 87'; Webster (yellow card) 90+5'	Stadium: The Lamex Stadium; Attendance: 2,616; Referee: Martin Coy

17 September 2019 9	Stevenage	0–1	Northampton Town	Stevenage
19:45 BST	Stokes (yellow card) 21'; Wildin (yellow card) 41'; Farman (yellow card) 67'	Report	Turnbull (yellow card) 25'; Goode (yellow card) 38'; Smith 56' (yellow card) 67' (yellow-red card) 68'; McWilliams (yellow card) 64'; Oliver (yellow card) 80'	Stadium: The Lamex Stadium; Attendance: 2,877; Referee: Charles Breakspear

21 September 2019 10	Forest Green Rovers	0–0	Stevenage	Nailsworth
15:00 BST	Taylor (yellow card) 48' (yellow-red card) 86'; Kitching (yellow card) 51'; McGinley (yellow card) 85'	Report	Guthrie (yellow card) 19'; Timlin (yellow card) 52'; Watts (yellow card) 90+4'	Stadium: The New Lawn; Attendance: 1,881; Referee: Darren Drysdale

28 September 2019 11	Stevenage	1–1	Cambridge United	Stevenage
15:00 BST	Cowley 9'; Timlin (yellow card) 21'; Farman (yellow card) 68'	Report	Roles (yellow card) 48'; Smith 83'; Lewis (yellow card) 89'	Stadium: The Lamex Stadium; Attendance: 3,452; Referee: Will Finnie

5 October 2019 12	Colchester United	3–1	Stevenage	Colchester
15:00 BST	Robinson (yellow card) 32'; Eastman 48' (yellow card) 90+4'; Nouble 82' (pen.); Poku 83'	Report	Cowley 17'; Stokes (yellow card) 74'; Farman (yellow card) 81'	Stadium: Weston Homes Stadium; Attendance: 3,331; Referee: Nick Kinseley

12 October 2019 13	Stevenage	2–1	Grimsby Town	Stevenage
15:00 BST	Guthrie 17'; Carter 44'; Farman (yellow card) 83'	Report	Rose 80'	Stadium: The Lamex Stadium; Attendance: 3,220; Referee: Neil Hair

19 October 2019 14	Port Vale	1–1	Stevenage	Burslem
15:00 BST	Taylor 8'; Joyce (yellow card) 70'	Report	Guthrie 23' (pen.); Cuthbert (yellow card) 43'	Stadium: Vale Park; Attendance: 4,429; Referee: Peter Wright

22 October 2019 15	Swindon Town	1–0	Stevenage	Swindon
19:45 BST	Grant (yellow card) 12'; Fryers (yellow card) 61'; Doyle 90' (yellow card) 90+2'	Report	Parrett (yellow card) 79'; Denton (yellow card) 90'; Farman (yellow card) 90+4'	Stadium: County Ground; Referee: Alan Young

26 October 2019 16	Stevenage	1–0	Morecambe	Stevenage
15:00 BST	Vancooten (yellow card) 69'; Cuthbert 82'; Watts (yellow card) 85'	Report	Brewitt (yellow card) 51'; Lavelle (yellow card) 87'	Stadium: The Lamex Stadium; Attendance: 2,288; Referee: Kevin Johnson

2 November 2019 17	Scunthorpe United	0–0	Stevenage	Scunthorpe
15:00 GMT		Report	Timlin (yellow card) 58'	Stadium: Sands Venue Stadium; Attendance: 3,309; Referee: Anthony Backhouse

16 November 2019	Stevenage	v	Oldham Athletic	Stevenage
15:00 GMT		Report		Stadium: The Lamex Stadium
Note: On 13 November, the match was postponed due to international call ups.

23 November 2019 18	Walsall	0–0	Stevenage	Bescot
15:00 GMT	Scarr (yellow card) 68'	Report	Cowley (yellow card) 43'; Fernandez (yellow card) 90+2'	Stadium: Banks's Stadium; Attendance: 4,938; Referee: Lee Swabey

7 December 2019 19	Stevenage	0–0	Crawley Town	Stevenage
15:00 GMT		Report		Stadium: The Lamex Stadium; Referee: Brett Huxtable

14 December 2019 20	Newport County	1–1	Stevenage	Newport
15:00 GMT	Matt 90+2'	Report	Sonupe 12'; Denton (yellow card) 90+3'	Stadium: Rodney Parade; Attendance: 3,556; Referee: Chris Sarginson

21 December 2019 21	Stevenage	1–5	Crewe Alexandra	Stevenage
15:00 GMT	Cuthbert (yellow card) 28' (goal) 84'; Sonupe (yellow card) 90+1'	Report	Anene 29', 65'; Finney 32'; Powell 57'; Cuthbert 70' (o.g.)	Stadium: The Lamex Stadium; Attendance: 2,993; Referee: Charles Breakspear

26 December 2019 22	Stevenage	0–0	Forest Green Rovers	Stevenage
15:00 GMT	Cowley (yellow card) 33'	Report		Stadium: The Lamex Stadium; Attendance: 2,388; Referee: James Oldham

29 December 2019 23	Plymouth Argyle	2–1	Stevenage	Plymouth
15:00 GMT	Denton 23' (o.g.); Sarcevic (yellow card) 43'; Canavan (yellow card) 65' (goal) 90+6'	Report	Parrett (yellow card) 60'; List 60'; Nugent (yellow card) 88'; Taylor (yellow card) 90+5'	Stadium: Home Park; Attendance: 11,719; Referee: John Busby

1 January 2020 24	Northampton Town	1–0	Stevenage	Northampton
15:00 GMT	Harriman (yellow card) 40'; Anderson (yellow card) 45+1'; Hoskins 57'; Wharton (yellow card) 78'; Williams 90+4'	Report	Timlin (yellow card) 28'; Soares (yellow card) 51'; List (yellow card) 74'; Nugent (yellow card) 81'	Stadium: PTS Academy Stadium; Attendance: 4,613; Referee: Trevor Kettle

4 January 2020 25	Stevenage	0–0	Colchester United	Stevenage
15:00 GMT	Parrett (yellow card) 13'; Soares (red card) 19'	Report	Stevenson (yellow card) 34'; Prosser (yellow card) 40'	Stadium: The Lamex Stadium; Attendance: 3,027; Referee: Oliver Yates

11 January 2020 26	Stevenage	0–1	Port Vale	Stevenage
15:00 GMT	Timlin (yellow card) 79'; Nugent (yellow card) 88'	Report	Joyce (yellow card) 59'; Pope 88' (pen.)	Stadium: The Lamex Stadium; Attendance: 2,646; Referee: Lee Swabey

14 January 2020 27	Stevenage	0–0	Oldham Athletic	Stevenage
19:45 GMT	Stokes (yellow card) 79'	Report	Mills (yellow card) 31'; Jones (yellow card) 39'; Wheater (yellow card) 53'	Stadium: The Lamex Stadium; Attendance: 2,156; Referee: Kevin Johnson

18 January 2020 28	Cambridge United	0–4	Stevenage	Cambridge
15:00 GMT	Knoyle (yellow card) 23'; O'Neil (yellow card) 39'; Lewis (yellow card) 90'	Report	List 36'; Cassidy 59'; Carter 87'; Lakin 90+4'	Stadium: Abbey Stadium; Attendance: 4,228; Referee: Ross Joyce

25 January 2020 29	Stevenage	1–2	Plymouth Argyle	Stevenage
15:00 GMT	Carter 89'	Report	Moore 47'; Hardie 85'; Wootton (yellow card) 90+11'	Stadium: The Lamex Stadium; Attendance: 3,627; Referee: Sam Purkiss

28 January 2020 30	Grimsby Town	3–1	Stevenage	Cleethorpes
19:45 GMT	Nugent 17' (o.g.); Clarke 63' (pen.) (yellow card) 64'; Vernam 72'; Hendrie (yellow card) 78'	Report	Lakin (yellow card) 79' (goal) 90+2'; Nugent (yellow card) 87'	Stadium: Blundell Park; Attendance: 4,175; Referee: Tom Nield

1 February 2020 31	Stevenage	0–3	Leyton Orient	Stevenage
15:00 GMT	Parrett (yellow card) 58'; Cassidy (yellow card) 67'	Report	Sotiriou 19', 62'; Clay (yellow card) 33'; Brophy (yellow card) 47'; Cissé 59'; Wilkinson (yellow card) 90+5'	Stadium: Lamex Stadium; Referee: Graham Salisbury

8 February 2020 32	Exeter City	2–1	Stevenage	Exeter
15:00 GMT	Williams 36'; Jay 81'	Report	Digby (yellow card) 42'; Parrett (yellow card) 69'; Kemp 79'; Dabo (yellow card) 83'; Reading (yellow card) 90+1'	Stadium: St James Park; Attendance: 4,458; Referee: Ollie Yates

11 February 2020 33	Bradford City	3–1	Stevenage	Bradford
19:45 GMT	McCartan 49', 54'; Novak 90+3'	Report	Nugent (yellow card) 7'; Kemp (yellow card) 20'; Carter 26'	Stadium: The Utilita Energy Stadium; Attendance: 12,845; Referee: Peter Wright

15 February 2020 34	Stevenage	0–1	Salford City	Stevenage
15:00 GMT	Soares (yellow card) 59'; Parrett (yellow card) 90+2'	Report	Baldwin (yellow card) 26'; Thomas-Asante 32' (yellow card) 68'; O'Connor (yellow card) 37'; Touray (yellow card) 90'	Stadium: The Lamex Stadium; Attendance: 3,246; Referee: Alan Young

22 February 2020 35	Crawley Town	2–0	Stevenage	Crawley
15:00 GMT	Lubala 21'; Camará (yellow card) 81'; Nadesan 90+3'	Report	Wildin (yellow card) 65'; Carroll (yellow card) 89'	Stadium: Broadfield Stadium; Attendance: 2,232; Referee: Paul Marsden

29 February 2020	Stevenage	v	Walsall	Stevenage
15:00 GMT		Report		Stadium: Lamex Stadium
Note: Match was postponed due to a waterlogged pitch.

7 March 2020 36	Crewe Alexandra	3–1	Stevenage	Crewe
15:00 GMT	Porter 15'; Kirk 63'; Wintle 67'	Report	Lakin (yellow card) 57'; Mackail-Smith (yellow card) 75'; Carter 90'	Stadium: Alexandra Stadium; Attendance: 4,263; Referee: Andy Haines

14 March 2020	Stevenage	v	Newport County	Stevenage
15:00 GMT				Stadium: Lamex Stadium
Note: Season was suspended until 3 April 2020, due to the COVID-19 pandemic.

17 March 2020	Stevenage	v	Swindon Town	Stevenage
19:45 GMT				Stadium: The Lamex Stadium
Note: Season was suspended until 3 April 2020, due to the COVID-19 pandemic.

21 March 2020	Morecambe	v	Stevenage	Morecambe
15:00 GMT				Stadium: Globe Arena
Note: Season was suspended until 3 April 2020, due to the COVID-19 pandemic.

28 March 2020	Stevenage	v	Scunthorpe United	Stevenage
15:00 GMT				Stadium: The Lamex Stadium
Note: Season was suspended until 3 April 2020, due to the COVID-19 pandemic.

4 April 2020	Oldham Athletic	v	Stevenage	Oldham
15:00 BST				Stadium: Boundary Park
Note: On 3 April, the English Football League decided to postpone all football until safe to do so due to the COVID-19 pandemic.

10 April 2020	Stevenage	v	Mansfield Town	Stevenage
15:00 BST				Stadium: The Lamex Stadium
Note: On 3 April, the English Football League decided to postpone all football until safe to do so due to the COVID-19 pandemic.

13 April 2020	Macclesfield Town	v	Stevenage	Macclesfield
13:00 BST				Stadium: Moss Rose
Note: On 3 April, the English Football League decided to postpone all football until safe to do so due to the COVID-19 pandemic.

18 April 2020	Stevenage	v	Cheltenham Town	Stevenage
15:00 BST				Stadium: The Lamex Stadium
Note: On 3 April, the English Football League decided to postpone all football until safe to do so due to the COVID-19 pandemic.

25 April 2020	Carlisle United	v	Stevenage	Carlisle
15:00 BST				Stadium: Brunton Park
Note: On 3 April, the English Football League decided to postpone all football until safe to do so due to the COVID-19 pandemic.

=== FA Cup ===
The first round draw was made on 21 October 2019.

9 November 2019 First round	Stevenage	1–1	Peterborough United	Stevenage
15:00 GMT	Watts (yellow card) 6'; List 56'; Stokes (yellow card) 81'	Report	Thompson (yellow card) 24'; Butler (yellow card) 47'; Maddison 79'; Woodyard (yellow card) 81'	Stadium: The Lamex Stadium; Attendance: 2,981; Referee: Nick Kinseley

19 November 2019 First round replay	Peterborough United	2–0	Stevenage	Peterborough
19:45 GMT	Eisa 11'; Toney (yellow card) 55'; Jones 90+4'	Report	Fernandez (yellow card) 56'	Stadium: Weston Homes Stadium; Attendance: 3,593; Referee: Ollie Yates

=== EFL Cup ===
The first round draw was made on 20 June.

13 August 2019 First round	Stevenage	1–2	Southend United	Stevenage
19:45 BST	Parrett 14'; Guthrie (yellow card) 45+5'; Fernandez (yellow card) 72'	Report	Kelman 47', 55'; Hutchinson (yellow card) 69'	Stadium: Lamex Stadium; Attendance: 1,315; Referee: Chris Sarginson

=== EFL Trophy ===
On 9 July 2019, the pre-determined group stage draw was announced with Invited clubs to be drawn on 12 July 2019. The draw for the second round was made on 16 November 2019 live on Sky Sports. The third round draw was confirmed on 5 December 2019.

Pos	Div	Team	Pld	W	PW	PL	L	GF	GA	GD	Pts	Qualification
1	L1	Milton Keynes Dons	3	2	0	0	1	5	2	+3	6	Advance to Round 2
2	L2	Stevenage	3	1	1	0	1	2	4	−2	5	Advance to Round 2
3	ACA	Fulham U21	3	1	0	1	1	3	3	0	4	
4	L1	Wycombe Wanderers	3	1	0	0	2	3	4	−1	3	

Source: EFL.com

3 September 2019 Group stage	Stevenage	0–3	Milton Keynes Dons	Stevenage
19:45 BST		Report	McGrandles 16'; Nombe 78', 84'	Stadium: The Lamex Stadium; Attendance: 789; Referee: Sam Purkiss

8 October 2019 Group stage	Wycombe Wanderers	0–1	Stevenage	High Wycombe
19:45 BST	Ofoborh (yellow card) 57'	Report	Cowley 6'; Carter (yellow card) 62'; Guthrie (yellow card) 80'; Farman (yellow card) 87'; Denton (yellow card) 90'	Stadium: Adams Park; Attendance: 766; Referee: Joshua Smith

29 October 2019 Group stage	Stevenage	1–1 (4–2 p)	Fulham U21	Stevenage
19:45 GMT	Carter 35'	Report	Abraham 90+1'	Stadium: The Lamex Stadium; Attendance: 442; Referee: Craig Hicks
	Penalties
	Denton (penalty scored); Cowley (penalty scored); Byrom (penalty scored); Watts (penalty scored)		Carvalho (penalty missed); Taylor-Crossdale (penalty scored); Hilton (penalty missed); O'Riley (penalty scored)

3 December 2019 Second round	Colchester United	1–2	Stevenage	Colchester
19:30 GMT	Eastman (yellow card) 4'; Comley (yellow card) 27'; Pell (yellow card) 42'; Stokes 61' (o.g.)	Report	Cowley 4' (pen.), 31' (penalty missed) 14'; Digby (yellow card) 52'; Farman (yellow card) 90+3'	Stadium: JobServe Community Stadium; Attendance: 959; Referee: Neil Hair

8 January 2020 Third round	Bristol Rovers	0–1	Stevenage	Horfield
19:45 GMT	Upson (yellow card) 74' (yellow-red card) 87'; Craig (yellow card) 90'	Report	Mackail-Smith 17'; Nugent (yellow card) 24'; Kennedy (yellow card) 30'; Denton (yellow card) 45'; Parrett (yellow card) 58'; Vancooten (yellow card) 68'	Stadium: Memorial Stadium

21 January 2020 Quarter-final	Exeter City	3–0	Stevenage	Exeter
19:45 GMT	Randall (yellow card) 15'; Ajose 25'; Jay 30', 48'	Report	Lakin (yellow card) 8'	Stadium: St James Park; Attendance: 1,190; Referee: Antony Coggins

== Transfers ==
=== Transfers in ===
Date	Position	Nationality	Name	From	Fee	Ref.
1 July 2019	FW	(England)	Jason Cowley	(England) Bromsgrove Sporting	Undisclosed	
1 July 2019	CB	(England)	Jamie Fielding	(England) Hastings United	Undisclosed	
2 July 2019	AM	(England)	Charlie Carter	(England) Chesterfield	Undisclosed	
2 July 2019	DM	(England)	Paul Digby	(England) Forest Green Rovers	Undisclosed	
2 July 2019	LB	(England)	Chris Stokes	(England) Bury	Free transfer	
11 July 2019	LB	(England)	Tyler Denton	(England) Leeds United	Undisclosed	
15 July 2019	CM	(England)	Dean Parrett	(England) Gillingham	Free transfer	
1 August 2019	CM	(Afghanistan)	Noor Husin	(England) Notts County	Free transfer	
1 August 2019	CF	(England)	Paul Taylor	Free agent	Free transfer	
2 August 2019	GK	(France)	Sacha Bastien	(France) Granville	Free transfer	
2 August 2019	CM	(England)	Tom Soares	(England) AFC Wimbledon	Free transfer	
5 August 2019	RW	(Australia)	Joel Rollinson	(England) Reading	Free transfer	
31 August 2019	CF	(England)	Elliott List	(England) Gillingham	Undisclosed	
6 September 2019	CB	(Egypt)	Adam El-Abd	(England) Wycombe Wanderers	Free transfer	
20 September 2019	CM	(Republic of Ireland)	Michael Timlin	Free Agent	Free transfer	
14 January 2020	CF	(Wales)	Jake Cassidy	(England) Maidenhead United	Undisclosed	
17 January 2020	DM	(France)	Diaguely Dabo	Free Agent	Free transfer	
20 January 2020	CF	(Canada)	Simeon Jackson	(Scotland) Kilmarnock	Free transfer	
31 January 2020	RB	(Republic of Ireland)	Canice Carroll	(England) Brentford	Undisclosed	
31 January 2020	LB	(Scotland)	Patrick Reading	(England) Middlesbrough	Undisclosed	

=== Loans in ===
Date from	Position	Nationality	Name	From	Date until	Ref.
16 August 2019	CB	(England)	Kelland Watts	(England) Newcastle United	10 January 2020	
22 August 2019	AM	(England)	Charlie Lakin	(England) Birmingham City	30 June 2020	
2 September 2019	CF	(Scotland)	Craig Mackail-Smith	(England) Wycombe Wanderers	30 June 2020	
26 October 2019	GK	(England)	Sam French	(England) Derby County	2 November 2019	
6 January 2020	LM	(England)	Joe Leesley	(England) Harrogate Town	30 June 2020	
28 January 2020	CF	(Northern Ireland)	David Parkhouse	(England) Sheffield United	30 June 2020	
31 January 2020	CF	(Australia)	Ben Folami	(England) Ipswich Town	30 June 2020	
31 January 2020	RW	(England)	Dan Kemp	(England) West Ham United	30 June 2020	

=== Loans out ===
Date from	Position	Nationality	Name	To	Date until	Ref.
16 July 2019	CF	(England)	Joe White	(England) Biggleswade Town	January 2020	
23 July 2019	CF	(England)	Harry Draper	(England) Hitchin Town	30 June 2020	
31 August 2019	CF	(England)	Alex Reid	(England) Ebbsfleet United	1 January 2020	
19 September 2019	CF	(Cyprus)	Andronicos Georgiou	(England) St Albans City	November 2019	
14 November 2019	CF	(Cyprus)	Andronicos Georgiou	(England) Hendon	30 June 2020	
15 November 2019	CB	(England)	Jamie Fielding	(England) St Albans City	30 June 2020	
13 January 2020	CB	(England)	Jack Smith	(England) Braintree Town	February 2020	
13 January 2020	CF	(Northern Ireland)	Liam Smyth	(England) Braintree Town	February 2020	
27 January 2020	MF	(England)	Jamie Jellis	(England) Wingate & Finchley	March 2020	
24 February 2020	DM	(England)	Arthur Iontton	(England) Braintree Town	March 2020	

=== Transfers out ===
Date	Position	Nationality	Name	To	Fee	Ref.
1 July 2019	GK	(England)	Will Appleyard	(England) FC Halifax Town	Released	
1 July 2019	GK	(England)	Oliver Byrne	Free agent	Released	
1 July 2019	RW	(Jamaica)	Jamal Campbell-Ryce	Free agent	Released	
1 July 2019	RB	(England)	Ronnie Henry	(England) Billericay Town	Free transfer	
1 July 2019	LB	(England)	Johnny Hunt	(Scotland) Hamilton Academical	Released	
1 July 2019	RB	(France)	Donovan Makoma	Free agent	Mutual consent	
1 July 2019	LB	(England)	Joe Martin	(England) Northampton Town	Released	
1 July 2019	CM	(Northern Ireland)	Mark McKee	(Northern Ireland) Cliftonville	Released	
1 July 2019	CM	(Republic of Ireland)	Michael Timlin	(England) Stevenage	Released	
1 July 2019	CB	(England)	Luke Wilkinson	(England) Yeovil Town	Released	
4 July 2019	CF	(England)	Alex Revell	Retired		
14 July 2019	MF	(England)	Marcus Gouldbourne	(Sweden) Ytterhogdals	Free transfer	
15 July 2019	DM	(England)	James Ball	(England) Ebbsfleet United	Undisclosed	
23 July 2019	FW	(England)	Devonte Simms	(England) Hitchin Town	Free transfer	
8 January 2020	CF	(England)	Joe White	(England) Hendon	Undisclosed	
21 January 2020	CM	(Republic of Ireland)	Michael Timlin	Free agent	Released	
31 January 2020	CF	(England)	Kurtis Guthrie	(England) Bradford City	Undisclosed	
31 January 2020	LB	(England)	Chris Stokes	(England) Forest Green Rovers	Free transfer	
22 February 2020	CM	(Afghanistan)	Noor Husin	(England) Dartford	Free transfer	
