= Jamie Fielding =

Jamie Fielding is the name of:

- Jamie Fielding (footballer), English footballer
- Jamie Fielding (musician), Australian musician
