= Tinubu (disambiguation) =

Tinubu may refer to:

== People ==
- Bola Tinubu, a Nigerian politician who is the 16th and current president of Nigeria.
- Oluremi Tinubu, current First Lady of Nigeria, senator for Lagos Central, and First Lady of Lagos State from 1999 to 2007
- Wale Tinubu, Nigerian businessman and lawyer who is group chief executive of Oando PLC.
- Efunroye Tinubu, 19th-century Yoruba merchant and slave trader.
- Folashade Tinubu-Ojo, Ìyál'ọ́jà of Lagos.
- Sam Tinubu, English footballer.
- Gloria Bromell Tinubu, American politician, educator, and economist.

== Places ==
- Tinubu Square, a landmark in Lagos, Nigeria (formerly known as Independence Square).
- Johnson Jakande Tinubu Park, a public park in Ikeja, Lagos, Nigeria.
