= Jason Cowley =

Jason Cowley is the name of:

- Jason Cowley (footballer)
- Jason Cowley (journalist)
