= Liam Smyth =

English footballer (born 2001)

Personal information
- Full name: Liam Daniel Smyth
- Date of birth: 6 September 2001 (age 25)
- Place of birth: Watford, England
- Position: Forward

Team information
- Current team: Biggleswade United

Youth career
- 2016–2018: Stevenage

Senior career*
Years	Team	Apps	(Gls)
2018–2021	Stevenage	4	(0)
2020	→ Braintree Town (loan)	10	(4)
2020–2021	→ Braintree Town (loan)	7	(1)
2021–2022	Wingate & Finchley	25	(4)
2021–2022	→ Biggleswade Town (loan)	10	(3)
2022–2023	Biggleswade Town	9	(1)
2022–2023	St Neots Town	4	(0)
2023–2024	Tring Athletic		
2024–	Biggleswade United		

International career
2018–2019	Northern Ireland U19	5	(1)
- * Club domestic league appearances and goals as of 15:23, 23 October 2025 (UTC)

Liam Daniel Smyth (born 6 September 2001) is a footballer who plays as a forward for Spartan South Midlands League Premier Division club Biggleswade United.

A graduate of the Stevenage academy, Smyth became the club's youngest debutant in the Football League in October 2018. He later had two loan spells at Braintree Town of the National League South before being released by Stevenage at the end of the 2020–21 season. Smyth subsequently joined Isthmian League Premier Division club Wingate & Finchley in July 2021 and went on to play for Biggleswade Town, St Neots Town, and Tring Athletic before signing for Biggleswade United in July 2024.

== Club career ==
=== Stevenage ===
While a first-year scholar in the Stevenage academy, Smyth made his first-team debut as a 57th-minute substitute in an 8–0 EFL Trophy defeat to Charlton Athletic on 9 October 2018. In doing so, he became the club's youngest debutant in the English Football League, aged 17 years and 37 days, a record later surpassed by Sam Tinubu. Smyth made his Football League debut in a 0–0 home draw with Port Vale on 23 October 2018 and signed his first professional contract on 9 November 2018. He made four first-team appearances during the 2018–19 season while also featuring regularly for the under-18 team.

Smyth made two substitute appearances during the first half of the 2019–20 season before joining National League South club Braintree Town on loan on 11 January 2020. He scored his first senior goal a week later in a 4–1 away victory over Oxford City, finishing his initial spell with four goals in 10 appearances. He returned to Braintree on loan in September 2020, scoring once in seven matches before being released by Stevenage at the end of the 2020–21 season.

=== Non-League ===
Smyth signed a one-year contract with Isthmian League Premier Division club Wingate & Finchley on 27 July 2021. He debuted in a 1–0 home defeat to Margate on 14 August 2021, playing 71 minutes of the match. Smyth scored four goals in 32 appearances before joining Southern League Premier Division Central club Biggleswade Town on loan in March 2022, reuniting with former Stevenage academy manager Robbie O'Keefe. He scored on his debut in a 1–0 win against Bromsgrove Sporting and finished the season with three goals in 10 appearances.

He joined Biggleswade Town permanently ahead of the 2022–23 season but played a peripheral role following O'Keefe's departure, scoring once in 15 appearances, 12 of which were as a substitute. In November 2022, Smyth moved to St Neots Town of the Northern Premier League Division One Midlands. A hamstring injury sustained in training sidelined him for three months, restricting him to four appearances. Smyth spent the 2023–24 season at Spartan South Midlands League Premier Division club Tring Athletic, scoring eight goals in 26 appearances.

In July 2024, he joined fellow Spartan South Midlands League Premier Division club Biggleswade United. He finished the 2024–25 season as the club's leading goalscorer with 20 league goals, ranking as the division's second-highest scorer.

== International career ==
Smyth received his first call-up to the Northern Ireland under-19 team for a pair of friendly matches against Slovakia in September 2018. He had previously trained with the squad during a camp at Lilleshall six months earlier. Smyth featured in both matches, scoring the opening goal in a 4–1 victory on 7 September 2018.

== Career statistics ==
As of end of 2023–24 season

Appearances and goals by club, season and competition
Club	Season	League			FA Cup		EFL Cup		Other		Total	
Club	Season	Division	Apps	Goals	Apps	Goals	Apps	Goals	Apps	Goals	Apps	Goals
Stevenage	2018–19	League Two	3	0	0	0	0	0	1 (Note: Appearance in EFL Trophy)	0	4	0
Stevenage	2019–20	League Two	1	0	1	0	0	0	0	0	2	0
Stevenage	2020–21	League Two	0	0	0	0	0	0	0	0	0	0
Stevenage	Total		4	0	1	0	0	0	1	0	6	0
Braintree Town (loan)	2019–20	National League South	10	4	0	0	—		0	0	10	4
Braintree Town (loan)	2020–21	National League South	7	1	0	0	—		0	0	7	1
Braintree Town (loan)	Total		17	5	0	0	0	0	0	0	17	5
Wingate & Finchley	2021–22	Isthmian League Premier Division	25	4	5	0	—		2 (Note: One appearance in Middlesex Senior Cup; one appearance in FA Trophy)	0	32	4
Biggleswade Town (loan)	2021–22	Southern League Premier Division Central	10	3	—		—		0	0	10	3
Biggleswade Town	2022–23	Southern League Division One Central	9	1	5	0	—		1 (Note: Appearance in FA Trophy)	0	15	1
Biggleswade Town	Total		19	4	5	0	0	0	1	0	25	4
St Neots Town	2022–23	Northern Premier Division One Midlands	4	0	0	0	—		0	0	4	0
Tring Athletic	2023–24	Spartan South Midlands Premier Division	Season statistics incomplete								26	8
Biggleswade United	2024–25	Spartan South Midlands Premier Division	Season statistics not known									
Biggleswade United	2025–26	Spartan South Midlands Premier Division	Season statistics not known									
Career total			69	13	11	0	0	0	4	0	110	21
