= Arthur Iontton =

English association football player

Personal information
- Full name: Arthur John Iontton
- Date of birth: 16 December 2000 (age 25)
- Place of birth: Enfield, England
- Height: 6 ft 0 in (1.83 m)
- Position: Central midfielder

Team information
- Current team: Cheshunt

Youth career
- 2011–2018: Stevenage

Senior career*
Years	Team	Apps	(Gls)
2018–2021	Stevenage	29	(1)
2020	→ Braintree Town (loan)	4	(0)
2021–2022	King's Lynn Town	3	(0)
2022	Hampton & Richmond Borough	0	(0)
2022–2023	Hendon	33	(0)
2023–2024	Haringey Borough	27	(1)
2024–2025	Wingate & Finchley	25	(0)
2025–	Cheshunt	32	(1)
- * Club domestic league appearances and goals as of 09:09, 26 August 2026 (UTC)

Arthur John Iontton (born 16 December 2000) is an English professional footballer who plays as a central midfielder for Isthmian League Premier Division club Cheshunt.

A graduate of the Stevenage academy, Iontton made his senior debut in April 2018 and signed his first professional contract in July 2018. Named League Two Apprentice of the Year at the 2019 EFL Awards, he made 38 appearances for Stevenage, including a brief loan at Braintree Town, before leaving in May 2021. He subsequently played in non-League football with King's Lynn Town, Hendon, Haringey Borough, and Wingate & Finchley, spending a season at each before joining Cheshunt in July 2025.

== Early life ==
Born in Enfield, Greater London, Iontton attended Winchmore School.

== Career ==
=== Stevenage ===
Iontton joined Stevenage at the age of ten, progressing through the club's youth academy. At 14, he signed a pre-scholarship contract under academy coach Darren Sarll and later captained the under-16 team, also featuring for the under-18 team during the 2016–17 season. He signed a two-year academy scholarship with the club on 22 June 2017. Iontton made his first-team debut as an 18th-minute substitute in a 3–1 League Two victory over Exeter City on 28 April 2018 and signed his first professional contract on 20 July 2018. He was named League Two Apprentice of the Year at the 2019 EFL Awards on 26 March 2019. He scored his first professional goal in a 3–0 home victory against Carlisle United on 13 April 2019. Iontton made 21 appearances that season, scoring once.

During the first half of the 2019–20 season, Iontton made 11 appearances for Stevenage before joining National League South club Braintree Town on a one-month loan on 24 February 2020, making four appearances during the loan spell. He featured four times for Stevenage during the 2020–21 season and was released by the club in May 2021.

=== King's Lynn Town and Hendon ===
After spending the early part of the 2021–22 season as a free agent, Iontton signed for National League club King's Lynn Town on 18 November 2021 on a contract until the end of the season. He made three appearances before being released in May 2022 following the club's relegation.

Initially announced as a signing for Hampton & Richmond Borough of the National League South on 25 May 2022, Iontton instead joined Southern League Premier Division South club Hendon on 3 August 2022. He made his debut in a 1–0 home defeat to Yate Town on 6 August 2022 and went on to make 44 appearances during the season, scoring one goal in a 5–1 away victory against Potton United in the FA Cup.

=== Further spells in non-League ===
Iontton signed for Isthmian League Premier Division club Haringey Borough on 29 June 2023, making 34 appearances during the 2023–24 season and scoring once in a 2–0 away victory against Cheshunt on 21 October 2023. He departed Haringey to sign for Wingate & Finchley on 15 June 2024, where he scored once in 29 appearances before leaving at the end of the 2024–25 season. Iontton joined fellow Isthmian League Premier Division club Cheshunt on 3 July 2025, scoring on his debut in a 4–2 win against Welling United on 9 August. He made 29 appearances during the 2025–26 season before signing a one-year contract extension in July 2026.

== Career statistics ==
As of match played 22 August 2026

Appearances and goals by club, season and competition
Club	Season	League			FA Cup		League Cup		Other		Total	
Club	Season	Division	Apps	Goals	Apps	Goals	Apps	Goals	Apps	Goals	Apps	Goals
Stevenage	2017–18	League Two	2	0	0	0	0	0	0	0	2	0
Stevenage	2018–19	League Two	18	1	0	0	0	0	3 (Note: Appearance(s) in EFL Trophy)	0	21	1
Stevenage	2019–20	League Two	7	0	0	0	1	0	3	0	11	0
Stevenage	2020–21	League Two	2	0	1	0	0	0	1	0	4	0
Stevenage	Total		29	1	1	0	1	0	7	0	38	1
Braintree Town (loan)	2019–20	National League South	4	0	—		—		—		4	0
King's Lynn Town	2021–22	National League	3	0	—		—		0	0	3	0
Hampton & Richmond Borough	2022–23	National League South	0	0	0	0	—		0	0	0	0
Hendon	2022–23	Southern Premier Division South	33	0	5	1	—		6 (Note: One appearance in FA Trophy; four appearances in London Senior Cup; one appearance in Middlesex Senior Cup)	0	44	1
Haringey Borough	2023–24	Isthmian League Premier Division	27	1	4	0	—		3 (Note: One appearance in FA Trophy; one appearance in London Senior Cup; one appearance in Alan Turvey Trophy)	0	34	1
Wingate & Finchley	2024–25	Isthmian League Premier Division	25	0	3	1	—		1 (Note: Appearance in Alan Turvey Trophy)	0	29	1
Cheshunt	2025–26	Isthmian League Premier Division	28	1	0	0	—		1	0	29	1
Cheshunt	2026–27	Isthmian League Premier Division	4	0	0	0	—		0	0	4	0
Cheshunt	Total		32	1	0	0	0	0	1	0	33	1
Career total			153	3	13	2	1	0	18	0	185	5

== Honours ==
Individual

- League Two Apprentice of the Year: 2018–19
