= Elliot Osborne =

English association football player

Personal information
- Full name: Elliot James Osborne
- Date of birth: 16 May 1996 (age 30)
- Place of birth: Newcastle-under-Lyme, England
- Height: 6 ft 0 in (1.83 m)
- Position: Midfielder

Team information
- Current team: Macclesfield

Youth career
- 2005–2014: Port Vale

Senior career*
| Years | Team | Apps | (Gls) |
| 2014–2015 | Newcastle Town | | |
| 2015–2016 | Nantwich Town | | |
| 2016–2018 | Fleetwood Town | 0 | (0) |
| 2016 | → Tranmere Rovers (loan) | 3 | (0) |
| 2017 | → Stockport County (loan) | 6 | (1) |
| 2017–2018 | → Morecambe (loan) | 11 | (0) |
| 2018 | Southport | 24 | (4) |
| 2018 | → Stockport County (loan) | 5 | (1) |
| 2018–2020 | Stockport County | 72 | (10) |
| 2020–2022 | Stevenage | 40 | (2) |
| 2022–2026 | Altrincham | 169 | (4) |
| 2026– | Macclesfield | 24 | (2) |
- * Club domestic league appearances and goals as of 20:07, 30 April 2026 (UTC)

Elliot James Osborne (born 16 May 1996) is an English professional footballer who plays as a midfielder for National League North club Macclesfield.

Released by Port Vale at the age of 18, he came through non-League teams Newcastle Town and Nantwich Town to turn professional at Fleetwood Town in June 2016. From Fleetwood, he was loaned out to Tranmere Rovers, Stockport County, and Morecambe, before being sold to Southport in February 2018. He joined Stockport County permanently in November 2018 following a second loan spell at the club and helped County to win the 2018–19 National League North title. He signed with Stevenage in July 2020 and moved on to Altrincham in January 2022, where he spent the next four years. He signed with Macclesfield in January 2026.

== Career ==
=== Early career ===
After nine years in the Port Vale academy, Osborne was released by the club at 18. He joined Northern Premier League Division One South club Newcastle Town in July 2014. After scoring seven times in 27 appearances for Newcastle Town, Osborne joined Nantwich Town of the Northern Premier League Premier Division on 26 February 2015. The 2015–16 campaign was to serve as Osborne's breakthrough season in terms of attacking output from midfield, scoring 22 times in all competitions.

=== Fleetwood Town ===
His performances for Nantwich during the previous season meant that he had been watched by some EFL clubs. Osborne was made aware that one of those clubs interested in him was Fleetwood Town, playing in League One. He went to visit the club's training facilities. Subsequently, he signed a contract on 17 June 2016. Upon signing, Osborne was placed in the development squad with the opportunity to progress into the first-team set-up. He joined National League club Tranmere Rovers on a 28-day loan deal on 30 September 2016. A day later, Osborne made his Tranmere debut, replacing James Norwood in the 66th minute during a 0–0 draw with Dagenham & Redbridge. Osborne made his first Tranmere start in their 1–0 home defeat against Gateshead on 4 October, playing the whole match. Upon his return from Tranmere, Osborne made his Fleetwood Town debut in an EFL Trophy tie against Carlisle United on 9 November 2016, in which Fleetwood suffered a 4–2 defeat.

Having made no further appearances for the Fleetwood first-team, Osborne joined Stockport County of the National League North on a two-month loan deal on 19 January 2017. Two days later, Osborne made his Stockport debut in their 3–3 draw with Darlington 1883. He scored his first goal for Stockport in a 2–1 victory over FC United of Manchester at Edgeley Park on 18 February; this proved to be his last appearance for the side before he returned to Fleetwood. Osborne was loaned out once again, this time joining League Two club Morecambe on a half-season loan on 9 August 2017. He scored one goal in 13 appearances during the loan spell.

=== Southport ===
Osborne and Fleetwood teammate Dion Charles were sold to National League North club Southport on 12 January 2018 for an undisclosed fee. Manager Kevin Davies stated that he had been impressed by Osborne's form at Morecambe and consequently wanted to sign him. He scored three goals in 16 appearances for the club in the second half of the 2017–18 season.

=== Return to Stockport ===
Having made eight appearances and scored one goal during the opening month of the 2018–19 season, Osborne returned to Stockport County on loan on 21 September 2018. The deal was made permanent on 6 November 2017, signing a two-year deal at the club; manager Jim Gannon said that "I trust that as he matures and develops as a player that it will add to our own growth as a team and club." He scored two goals in 37 appearances over the course of the 2018–19 season, helping Stockport to win promotion as champions of National League North. He scored nine goals in 42 games in the 2019–20 season, the club's first season return in the National League, including a hat-trick in a 5–1 home win over FC Halifax Town. He made 79 appearances and scored 11 times during his two-year stay at Stockport.

=== Stevenage ===
Osborne returned to the Football League when he joined League Two club Stevenage on 1 July 2020. On signing Osborne, Stevenage manager Alex Revell said that "he's coming off the back of a couple of hugely successful seasons and will bring goals, a creativity and dynamism that we are all excited to watch". He scored two goals in 30 games during the 2020–21 season, including the only goal of the game at Crawley Town on 16 February; following that game he said that "I've been injured for a few months [an ankle injury required surgery] and I just wanted to do something, either today or whenever, just to make a statement to the gaffer". He fell out of the first-team picture following the appointment of Paul Tisdale as manager in November 2021.

=== Altrincham ===
On 6 January 2022, Osborne signed for National League side Altrincham; he had worked under manager Phil Parkinson at Nantwich. He made 23 appearances in the second half of the 2021–22 season and signed a new contract in May 2022. He played 46 games in the 2022–23 campaign, scoring two goals. He made 48 appearances in the 2023–24 season, including in the play-off semi-final defeat to Bromley. He then signed a new contract, with the club writing that his "expansive range of passing, ball retention ability and unrelenting hard work made him a pivotal part of the Alty team". He played 50 matches in the 2024–25 season. He featured another 21 times in the first half of the 2025–26 campaign, before he had his contract terminated by mutual consent on 9 January.

=== Macclesfield ===
On 12 January 2026, Osborne joined National League North club Macclesfield. He played 24 league games in the second half of the 2025–26 season, and also played in the FA Cup defeat to Premier League side Brentford.

== Style of play ==
After signing Osborne for Southport in January 2018, manager Kevin Davies stated the player "has a fantastic passing range, high energy and an eye for goal, as well as those battling qualities that we need in our team right now".

== Career statistics ==
As of match played 2 May 2026

Appearances and goals by club, season and competition
| Club | Season | League | | | FA Cup | | EFL Cup | | Other | | Total | |
| Club | Season | Division | Apps | Goals | Apps | Goals | Apps | Goals | Apps | Goals | Apps | Goals |
|---|---|---|---|---|---|---|---|---|---|---|---|---|
| Fleetwood Town | 2016–17 | League One | 0 | 0 | 0 | 0 | 0 | 0 | 1 (Note: Appearance(s) in EFL Trophy.) | 0 | 1 | 0 |
| Fleetwood Town | 2017–18 | League One | 0 | 0 | 0 | 0 | 0 | 0 | 0 | 0 | 0 | 0 |
| Fleetwood Town | Total | | 0 | 0 | 0 | 0 | 0 | 0 | 1 | 0 | 1 | 0 |
| Tranmere Rovers (loan) | 2016–17 | National League | 3 | 0 | 0 | 0 | — | | 0 | 0 | 3 | 0 |
| Stockport County (loan) | 2016–17 | National League North | 6 | 1 | — | | — | | — | | 6 | 1 |
| Morecambe (loan) | 2017–18 | League Two | 11 | 0 | 0 | 0 | 0 | 0 | 2 | 1 | 13 | 1 |
| Southport | 2017–18 | National League North | 16 | 3 | 0 | 0 | — | | 0 | 0 | 16 | 3 |
| Southport | 2018–19 | National League North | 8 | 1 | 0 | 0 | — | | 0 | 0 | 8 | 1 |
| Southport | Total | | 24 | 4 | 0 | 0 | 0 | 0 | 0 | 0 | 24 | 4 |
| Stockport County | 2018–19 | National League North | 29 | 2 | 3 | 0 | — | | 5 (Note: Appearance(s) in FA Trophy.) | 0 | 37 | 2 |
| Stockport County | 2019–20 | National League | 38 | 9 | 1 | 0 | — | | 3 | 0 | 42 | 9 |
| Stockport County | Total | | 77 | 11 | 4 | 0 | 0 | 0 | 8 | 0 | 89 | 11 |
| Stevenage | 2020–21 | League Two | 26 | 2 | 1 | 0 | 1 | 0 | 2 | 0 | 30 | 2 |
| Stevenage | 2021–22 | League Two | 14 | 0 | 3 | 0 | 1 | 0 | 3 | 0 | 21 | 0 |
| Stevenage | Total | | 40 | 2 | 4 | 0 | 2 | 0 | 5 | 0 | 51 | 2 |
| Altrincham | 2021–22 | National League | 23 | 0 | 0 | 0 | — | | 0 | 0 | 23 | 0 |
| Altrincham | 2022–23 | National League | 40 | 2 | 2 | 0 | — | | 4 | 0 | 46 | 2 |
| Altrincham | 2023–24 | National League | 44 | 0 | 1 | 0 | — | | 3 (Note: 2 appearances in FA Trophy and 1 appearance in play-offs.) | 0 | 48 | 0 |
| Altrincham | 2024–25 | National League | 42 | 1 | 0 | 0 | — | | 8 (Note: 4 appearances in FA Trophy and 4 appearances in National League Cup.) | 0 | 50 | 1 |
| Altrincham | 2025–26 | National League | 20 | 1 | 1 | 0 | — | | 0 | 0 | 21 | 1 |
| Altrincham | Total | | 169 | 4 | 4 | 0 | 0 | 0 | 15 | 0 | 188 | 4 |
| Macclesfield | 2025–26 | National League North | 24 | 2 | 1 | 0 | — | | 2 (Note: Appearance(s) in play-offs.) | 0 | 27 | 2 |
| Macclesfield | 2026–27 | National League North | 0 | 0 | 0 | 0 | — | | 0 | 0 | 0 | 0 |
| Macclesfield | Total | | 24 | 2 | 1 | 0 | 0 | 0 | 2 | 0 | 27 | 2 |
| Career total (Note: Statistics for Newcastle Town and Nantwich Town not recorded.) | | | 354 | 24 | 13 | 0 | 2 | 0 | 33 | 1 | 402 | 25 |

== Honours ==
Stockport County

- National League North: 2018–19
