= Charlie Carter (footballer) =

English association football player

Personal information
- Full name: Charlie Leslie Carter
- Date of birth: 25 October 1996 (age 30)
- Place of birth: Sutton, England
- Height: 1.88 m (6 ft 2 in)
- Position: Attacking midfielder

Team information
- Current team: Sutton United
- Number: 10

Youth career
- 2005–2013: Fulham
- 2013–2015: Woking

Senior career*
Years	Team	Apps	(Gls)
2015–2018	Woking	73	(12)
2015–2016	→ Chipstead (loan)		(10)
2018–2019	Chesterfield	20	(4)
2019–2022	Stevenage	67	(8)
2022–2023	Eastleigh	58	(10)
2023–2026	Dorking Wanderers	92	(33)
2026–	Sutton United	4	(0)
- * Club domestic league appearances and goals as of 19:30, 27 April 2026 (UTC)

Charlie Leslie Carter (born 25 October 1996) is an English professional footballer who plays as an attacking midfielder for National League club Sutton United.

Carter progressed through the youth systems at Fulham and Woking, signing his first professional contract with Woking ahead of the 2016–17 season, during which he established himself as a regular first-team player. After two seasons, the latter of which saw him finish as the club's top goalscorer from midfield, he joined Chesterfield of the National League in June 2018. Following one season at Chesterfield, Carter signed for League Two club Stevenage in July 2019 for an undisclosed fee. Over three seasons, he scored ten goals in 81 appearances before moving to Eastleigh in July 2022. He transferred to Dorking Wanderers for an undisclosed fee in October 2023. After three years at Dorking Wanderers, Carter returned to the National League joining Sutton United ahead of the 2026–27 campaign.

== Early life ==
Carter was born in Sutton, London, and attended Cheam High School.

== Career ==
=== Woking ===
Carter joined Fulham's academy at the age of eight before moving to Woking aged 16, where he was captain at various youth levels for three seasons. During the 2015–16 season, he spent time on loan at Chipstead, scoring ten goals for the club, including a first senior hat-trick in a 6–1 win away to Sittingbourne. Ahead of the 2016–17 season, he featured in several pre-season friendlies for Woking and subsequently signed his first professional contract. Carter made his competitive debut in a 2–2 draw away at Solihull Moors on 9 August 2016 and went on to make 36 appearances in all competitions as Woking finished 18th in the National League. He signed a contract extension on 15 June 2017, stating he had initially found the step up to the first team challenging but felt better equipped after a season's experience.

The 2017–18 season marked Carter's breakthrough season in terms of his attacking output from midfield. He scored his first goal for the club in a 3–1 away defeat to Tranmere Rovers on 8 August 2017 and finished the season with 12 goals in 46 appearances, ending the campaign as Woking's top goalscorer as the club were relegated to the National League South.

=== Chesterfield ===
Despite new Woking manager Alan Dowson expressing a preference for Carter to remain at the club for a further year to aid his development, Carter joined National League club Chesterfield for an undisclosed fee on 20 June 2018, with compensation due to Woking as he was under 24 years of age. Chesterfield manager Martin Allen had previously met Carter at Wembley Stadium during the 2018 FA Trophy final. Carter made his debut on the opening day of the 2018–19 season in a 1–0 away victory against Ebbsfleet United and scored twice in the following match, a 3–0 win over Aldershot Town on 7 August 2018. After appearing regularly in the opening two months of the season, he sustained an ankle injury in a 1–1 draw away at Maidstone United on 29 September 2018 and subsequently underwent surgery the following month. He returned to the first team on 23 February 2019, appearing as a 55th-minute substitute in a 1–0 defeat to Harrogate Town. Carter featured consistently thereafter, making 20 appearances in all competitions and scoring four goals as Chesterfield finished the season in 14th place in the National League.

=== Stevenage ===
Carter signed for League Two club Stevenage on 2 July 2019 for an undisclosed fee following several weeks of negotiations. He made his debut in a 2–1 home defeat to Southend United on 13 August 2019 and scored his first goal for the club in a 2–1 home victory against Grimsby Town on 12 October 2019. The goal proved to be decisive in earning Stevenage their first win of the 2019–20 season. Carter made 37 appearances that campaign, finishing as the club's top goalscorer with six goals. He scored four times in 23 appearances during the 2020–21 season before sustaining an injury in February 2021 that ended his season. Carter signed a new contract on 26 May 2021 and went on to make 20 appearances for Stevenage during the 2021–22 season before being released at its conclusion.

=== Eastleigh ===
Carter joined National League club Eastleigh on 4 July 2022. He scored his first goal for Eastleigh in a 1–1 draw with Dagenham & Redbridge on 16 August 2022. After featuring in every minute of Eastleigh's seven fixtures during February 2023, contributing one goal and one assist, he was named National League Player of the Month. Carter concluded the 2022–23 season with 11 goals in 50 appearances as Eastleigh narrowly missed the play-offs by four points. He scored once in 16 appearances during the opening two months of the 2023–24 season before expressing a desire to leave amid external transfer interest.

=== Dorking Wanderers ===
Carter signed for fellow National League club Dorking Wanderers on 16 October 2023 for an undisclosed fee. A week after joining, he sustained a broken wrist in training following a collision, sidelining him for two months. He made his debut in a 2–1 defeat to former club Woking on 16 December 2023. Carter scored eight goals in 26 appearances during the second half of the season as Dorking were relegated to the National League South after finishing 23rd.

Remaining with the club for the 2024–25 season, he was appointed club captain and scored his a hat-trick in a 4–0 away victory against Chelmsford City on 9 November 2024. He scored 15 goals in 41 appearances from an attacking midfield role. This included his second hat-trick for the club, scored in six and a half minutes during a 4–2 win over Hampton & Richmond Borough on 18 April 2025, the fastest in National League South history. Dorking were defeated in the National League South play-off quarter-finals, and Carter was subsequently named in the National League South Team of the Season in May 2025.

On 15 May 2026, it was confirmed that Carter would depart Dorking Wanderers after spending three years with the club, leaving with a record of 101 appearances and 37 goals.

=== Sutton United ===
On 29 May 2026, Carter agreed to join Sutton United following his departure from Dorking Wanderers.

== Style of play ==
Carter has predominantly been deployed as an attacking midfielder throughout his career. He has been noted for his ability to time late runs into the penalty area to exploit space and create scoring opportunities, described as combining work rate with composure in front of goal. His leadership qualities have also been highlighted, having captained both Eastleigh and Dorking Wanderers.

== Career statistics ==
As of match played 2 May 2026

Appearances and goals by club, season and competition
Club	Season	League			FA Cup		EFL Cup		Other		Total	
Club	Season	Division	Apps	Goals	Apps	Goals	Apps	Goals	Apps	Goals	Apps	Goals
Woking	2015–16	National League	0	0	0	0	—		0	0	0	0
Woking	2016–17	National League	32	0	4	0	—		0	0	36	0
Woking	2017–18	National League	41	12	4	0	—		1 (Note: Appearance(s) in FA Trophy)	0	46	12
Woking	Total		73	12	8	0	0	0	1	0	82	12
Chipstead (loan)	2015–16	Isthmian League Division One South	Season statistics not known									
Chesterfield	2018–19	National League	20	4	0	0	—		0	0	20	4
Stevenage	2019–20	League Two	29	5	2	0	1	0	5 (Note: Appearance(s) in EFL Trophy)	1	37	6
Stevenage	2020–21	League Two	18	3	3	0	1	1	1	0	23	4
Stevenage	2021–22	League Two	20	0	0	0	1	0	0	0	21	0
Stevenage	Total		67	8	5	0	3	1	6	1	81	10
Eastleigh	2022–23	National League	45	10	2	1	—		3	0	50	11
Eastleigh	2023–24	National League	13	0	1	1	—		0	0	14	1
Eastleigh	Total		58	10	3	2	0	0	3	0	64	12
Dorking Wanderers	2023–24	National League	25	8	—		—		1	0	26	8
Dorking Wanderers	2024–25	National League South	38	14	1	0	—		2 (Note: One appearance and one goal in FA Trophy; one appearance in 2025 National League South play-offs)	1	41	15
Dorking Wanderers	2025–26	National League South	29	11	2	3	—		3 (Note: One appearance in FA Trophy; two in 2026 National League South play-offs)	0	34	14
Dorking Wanderers	Total		92	33	3	3	0	0	6	1	101	37
Sutton United	2026–27	National League	0	0	0	0	—		0	0	0	0
Career total			310	67	19	5	3	1	16	2	348	75

== Honours ==
Individual

- National League Player of the Month: February 2023
- National League South Team of the Season: 2024–25, 2025–26
