= Jacob Bancroft =

English footballer

Personal information
- Full name: Jacob Elijah McLeod Bancroft
- Date of birth: 9 April 2001 (age 25)
- Place of birth: Reading, England
- Height: 6 ft 1 in (1.85 m)
- Position: Striker

Team information
- Current team: Swindon Supermarine

Youth career
- –2015: Aldershot Town
- 2015–2019: Swindon Town

Senior career*
Years	Team	Apps	(Gls)
2019–2020	Swindon Town	1	(0)
2019	→ Salisbury (loan)	3	(0)
2019	→ Thatcham Town (loan)	2	(0)
2020	→ Wantage Town (loan)	2	(0)
2020–2021	Oxford City	5	(1)
2021	Stevenage	0	(0)
2021–2022	Oxford City	33	(2)
2022	Billericay Town	6	(1)
2022	Hartley Wintney	9	(0)
2022–2023	Kingstonian	21	(1)
2023–2024	Hanwell Town	33	(6)
2024–2026	Hungerford Town	22	(2)
2026	Leatherhead	10	(1)
2026	Sutton Common Rovers	4	(1)
2026	Bracknell Town	4	(0)
2026–	Swindon Supermarine	0	(0)
- * Club domestic league appearances and goals as of 18:54, 11 September 2026 (UTC)

Jacob Elijah McLeod Bancroft (born 9 April 2001) is an English professional footballer who plays as a forward for Swindon Supermarine.

Having spent time at Aldershot Town on youth terms, Bancroft joined Swindon Town's academy in 2015. He made his professional debut for the club four years later and subsequently signed his first professional contract in May 2019. Three loan spells in the Southern Football League followed during the 2019–20 season, although Bancroft was ultimately released upon his return to Swindon in June 2020. He joined Oxford City of the National League South in September 2020. Bancroft signed for League Two club Stevenage in January 2021. He spent the remainder of the 2020–21 season there before rejoining Oxford City in July 2021.

== Career ==
=== Swindon Town ===
Bancroft began his career in the youth system at Aldershot Town, before joining Swindon Town's academy in 2015, aged fifteen. Whilst in the final year of his scholarship at Swindon, Bancroft made his first-team debut as a late substitute for the club in a 3–0 victory over Colchester United at the County Ground on 2 March 2019. Swindon subsequently offered Bancroft his first professional contract at the end of the 2018–19 season, which he signed on 9 May 2019.

Bancroft played in two of Swindon's pre-season friendly matches ahead of the 2019–20 season, one of which included him scoring in a 6–1 victory over Salisbury on 15 July 2019. Two weeks later, he joined Salisbury on a loan agreement until January 2020. Having made four appearances for Salisbury during the first three months of his time there, the loan deal was cut short and Bancroft joined Thatcham Town of the Southern League Division One South on 15 November 2019. He played three times for the club during the one-month loan agreement before returning Swindon. A third loan of the season followed when Bancroft joined Southern League Division One Central club Wantage Town on 16 February 2020 on a one-month deal. Bancroft made two appearances at Wantage before the season was curtailed due to the COVID-19 pandemic. He was released by Swindon in June 2020.

=== Oxford City ===
Without a club, Bancroft played in four of Oxford City's pre-season friendlies ahead of the start of their 2020–21 campaign, with a view to earning a contract for the season. The trial proved successful and he signed a one-year deal with the National League South club on 28 September 2020. He made his debut in Oxford's 2–0 home victory against Bath City on 6 October 2020, coming as a 95th-minute substitute in the match. Bancroft scored his first goals for the club, also his first in senior football, in a 4–2 win over Haringey Borough in the FA Trophy on 16 January 2021. Three days later, he scored his first league goal in a 5–3 win at Hemel Hempstead.

=== Stevenage ===
After scoring three times in his previous two games at Oxford City, Bancroft joined League Two club Stevenage on 21 January 2021. Bancroft was released by the club in May 2021, having made no first-team appearances during his time there.

=== Return to Oxford City ===
Bancroft returned to Oxford City on 1 July 2021, signing a two-year contract.

=== Billericay Town ===
In July 2022, Bancroft joined Isthmian League Premier Division club Billericay Town following their relegation to the division.

=== Hartley Wintney ===
In October 2022, Bancroft signed for Southern Football League Premier Division South club Hartley Wintney.

=== Kingstonian ===
On 2 December 2022, Bancroft signed for Kingstonian.

=== Leatherhead ===
In January 2026, Bancroft joined Isthmian League South Central Division leaders Leatherhead.

=== Bracknell Town ===
After a brief spell with Sutton Common Rovers, Bancroft joined Bracknell Town for the 2026-27 season.

=== Swindon Supermarine ===
Bancroft joined Swindon Supermarine in September 2026.

== Style of play ==
Bancroft has been deployed as both a winger and as a striker. His physicality, pace and directness of play have been highlighted as his main attributes.

== Career statistics ==
As of match played 21 January 2021

Appearances and goals by club, season and competition
Club	Season	League			FA Cup		EFL Cup		Other		Total	
Club	Season	Division	Apps	Goals	Apps	Goals	Apps	Goals	Apps	Goals	Apps	Goals
Swindon Town	2018–19	League Two	1	0	0	0	0	0	0	0	1	0
Swindon Town	2019–20	League Two	0	0	0	0	0	0	0	0	0	0
Swindon Town	Total		1	0	0	0	0	0	0	0	1	0
Salisbury (loan)	2019–20	Southern League Premier Division South	3	0	1	0	—		0	0	4	0
Thatcham Town (loan)	2019–20	Southern League Division One South	2	0	0	0	—		1 (Note: Appearance(s) in Southern League Cup)	0	3	0
Wantage Town (loan)	2019–20	Southern League Division One Central	2	0	0	0	—		0	0	2	0
Oxford City	2020–21	National League South	6	1	2	0	—		2 (Note: Appearance(s) in FA Trophy)	2	10	3
Stevenage	2020–21	League Two	0	0	0	0	0	0	0	0	0	0
Oxford City	2021–22	National League South	0	0	0	0	—		0	0	0	0
Career total			14	1	3	0	0	0	3	2	20	3
