= Inih Effiong =

English footballer

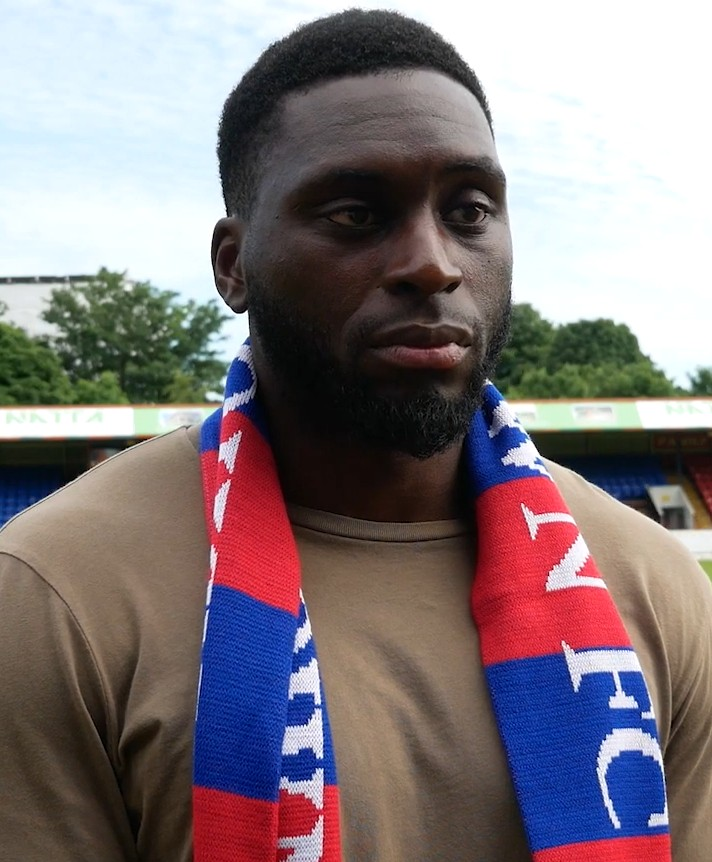
- Effiong in June 2022

Personal information
- Full name: Inih Othneil Effiong
- Date of birth: 2 March 1991 (age 35)
- Place of birth: Brent, England
- Height: 1.93 m (6 ft 4 in)
- Position: Forward

Team information
- Current team: St Albans City

Youth career
- –2008: St Albans City

Senior career*
| Years | Team | Apps | (Gls) |
| 2008–2009 | St Albans City | 6 | (0) |
| 2008 | → Northwood (loan) | 1 | (0) |
| 2009–2010 | Boreham Wood | 15 | (1) |
| 2010–2011 | St Albans City | 37 | (13) |
| 2011–2012 | Boreham Wood | 33 | (7) |
| 2011–2012 | → Hitchin Town (loan) | 15 | (3) |
| 2012 | → Chesham United (loan) | 7 | (7) |
| 2012–2014 | Chesham United | 66 | (14) |
| 2013 | → Hayes & Yeading United (loan) | 6 | (0) |
| 2014 | Dunstable Town | 11 | (6) |
| 2014 | Burnham | | (2) |
| 2014–2015 | Arlesey Town | 9 | (2) |
| 2015–2017 | Biggleswade Town | 68 | (39) |
| 2015 | → Hertford Town (loan) | 2 | (2) |
| 2017 | Barrow | 7 | (1) |
| 2017–2018 | Woking | 28 | (8) |
| 2018 | Ross County | 2 | (0) |
| 2018–2020 | Dover Athletic | 80 | (25) |
| 2020–2021 | Stevenage | 9 | (1) |
| 2020–2021 | → Barnet (loan) | 5 | (1) |
| 2021 | → Notts County (loan) | 12 | (1) |
| 2021–2022 | Woking | 40 | (13) |
| 2022–2023 | Aldershot Town | 28 | (14) |
| 2023–2024 | Dagenham & Redbridge | 46 | (25) |
| 2024 | Braintree Town | 21 | (2) |
| 2024–2025 | Woking | 25 | (5) |
| 2025 | → Chelmsford City (loan) | 3 | (0) |
| 2026 | Eastleigh | 9 | (1) |
| 2026– | St Albans City | 2 | (1) |
- * Club domestic league appearances and goals as of 15:25, 12 August 2026 (UTC)

Inih Othneil Effiong (born 2 March 1991) is an English professional footballer who plays as a forward for Isthmian League Premier Division club St Albans City.

== Career ==
Effiong was born in England and is of Nigerian descent. He started his career with St Albans City and made his debut in 2008, he went onto enjoy spells with Northwood and Boreham Wood before returning to City, two years later. Effiong went onto register fourteen goals in the 2013–14 campaign in forty-one appearances, this impressive form brought the attention of his former club, Boreham Wood. Unable to agree a fee, the deal went to a tribunal and Effiong returned to the Wood. After failing to adapt to life at Boreham Wood, Effiong had loan spells with Hitchin Town and Chesham United, where he flourished, especially at Chesham, netting seven times in seven games. He went onto to return to Boreham Wood, before making a permanent move back to Chesham. Following his two years with Chesham, Effiong went onto have spells at Dunstable Town, Burnham and Arlesey Town before joining Biggleswade Town in July 2015. Preceding a successful first season with the Waders, Effiong went onto net 23 times in the following campaign. This impressive form brought the attention of many Football League and National League sides.

On 27 January 2017, Effiong joined National League side, Barrow on a deal until the end of the campaign. On 18 February 2017, he made his debut for Barrow during their 0–0 home draw with Torquay United, replacing Richie Bennett in the 84th minute. A month later, Effiong scored his first and only goal for Barrow in their 2–1 home victory over Tranmere Rovers, netting the Bluebirds' equaliser in the 63rd minute. On 10 May 2017, it was announced that Effiong would leave Barrow upon the expiry of his contract in June.

Two weeks later, Effiong joined fellow National League side Woking on a one-year deal. On the opening day of the 2017–18 campaign, Effiong netted eighteen minutes into his Woking debut, during their 2–1 home victory over Gateshead. During Woking's impressive FA Cup run, Effiong netted twice in six appearances, including goals against League One sides Bury and Peterborough United. In the space of six months, Effiong registered ten goals in all competitions, his last coming in a 4–4 draw with Maidstone United, before leaving in January 2018.

On 19 January 2018, Effiong joined Scottish Premiership side Ross County on a one-and-a-half-year deal for an undisclosed fee. A day later, he made his debut for Ross County during their 1–0 away defeat to Kilmarnock in the Scottish Cup, featuring for 86 minutes before being replaced by Alex Schalk. Effiong left the club on 6 April 2018.

On 23 June 2018, Effiong signed for National League club Dover Athletic.

After two prolific seasons at Dover, Effiong joined Stevenage on 23 June 2020. He scored his first goal for Stevenage in a 1–1 draw against Barrow on 12 September 2020. Effiong joined Barnet on a one month loan on 2 December 2020. On 11 January 2021, Effiong joined National League side Notts County on loan for the remainder of the 2020–21 season. Unfortunately, his loan was terminated early, on 5 April 2021. On 15 May 2021, it was announced that he would leave Stevenage at the end of the season, following the expiry of his contract.

On 26 May 2021, Effiong agreed a deal to return to Woking on a one-year deal. On 21 August 2021, Effiong made his return in a Woking shirt, playing the full 90 minutes and assisting goalscorer, Max Kretzschmar during their 2–1 away victory against Wealdstone. He scored his first goal upon his return to the club during their 3–1 home victory over Chesterfield, netting the Cards' third in the 89th minute, completing the comeback after Saidou Khan's opener. Just four days later, Effiong scored once again, this time netting Woking's equaliser in their 4–1 away victory over former side, Notts County. Following one campaign back at Kingfield, on 26 May 2022, he announced that he would be leaving the club at the end of his contract in June. During his two spells, Effiong collated a total of 77 appearances and 23 goals to his name.

On 17 June 2022, Effiong agreed to join Woking's rivals Aldershot Town on a two-year deal. An impressive run of form saw Dagenham & Redbridge purchase the striker on an eighteen-month deal for an undisclosed fee in February 2023. He was later awarded the National League Player of the Month award for January 2023 following seven goals in eight matches prior to his departure.

In June 2024, Effiong joined newly promoted National League side Braintree Town.

On 6 December 2024, Effiong returned to Woking for his third spell at the club on a contract until June 2026. On 4 November 2025, Effiong joined National League South club Chelmsford City on a 28-day loan. On 28 December 2025, he departed with mutual consent from Woking after only making two league appearances for the team at the start of the season.

On 24 February 2026, Effiong joined fellow National League side, Eastleigh on a deal until the end of the 2025–26 campaign.

In July 2026, Effiong joined Isthmian League Premier Division club St Albans City, returning to the club after seventeen years.

== Personal life ==
Effiong is the founder of Identisurge, a digital access management platform.

== Career statistics ==
As of end of 2025-26 season

Appearances and goals by club, season and competition
| Club | Season | League | | | National cup (Note: Includes FA Cup, Scottish Cup) | | League cup (Note: Includes EFL Cup) | | Other | | Total | |
| Club | Season | Division | Apps | Goals | Apps | Goals | Apps | Goals | Apps | Goals | Apps | Goals |
|---|---|---|---|---|---|---|---|---|---|---|---|---|
| St Albans City | 2008–09 | Conference South | 6 | 0 | 0 | 0 | — | | 3 (Note: Appearance(s) in Herts Senior Cup) | 0 | 9 | 0 |
| Northwood (loan) | 2008–09 | IL Division One South | 1 | 0 | 0 | 0 | — | | 0 | 0 | 1 | 0 |
| Boreham Wood | 2009–10 | IL Premier Division | 15 | 1 | 0 | 0 | — | | 0 | 0 | 15 | 1 |
| St Albans City | 2010–11 | Conference South | 37 | 13 | 2 | 0 | — | | 2 (Note: One appearance and one goal in Herts Senior Cup, one appearance in FA Trophy) | 1 | 41 | 14 |
| Boreham Wood | 2011–12 | Conference South | 18 | 3 | 0 | 0 | — | | 1 | 0 | 19 | 3 |
| Boreham Wood | 2012–13 | Conference South | 15 | 4 | 4 | 1 | — | | 2 (Note: One appearance in Herts Senior Cup, one in FA Trophy) | 0 | 21 | 5 |
| Boreham Wood | Total | | 33 | 7 | 4 | 1 | — | | 3 | 0 | 40 | 8 |
| Hitchin Town (loan) | 2011–12 | SL Premier Division | 15 | 3 | — | | — | | — | | 15 | 3 |
| Chesham United (loan) | 2011–12 | SL Premier Division | 7 | 7 | — | | — | | — | | 7 | 7 |
| Chesham United | 2012–13 | SL Premier Division | 25 | 9 | 0 | 0 | — | | 2 (Note: One appearance in Berks & Bucks Senior Cup, one in Southern League Premier Division play-offs) | 0 | 27 | 9 |
| Chesham United | 2013–14 | SL Premier Division | 35 | 3 | 1 | 0 | — | | 8 (Note: Two appearances in Southern League Cup, two in FA Trophy, two appearances and two goals in Berks & Bucks Senior Cup, two appearances in Southern League Premier Division play-offs) | 2 | 44 | 5 |
| Chesham United | 2014–15 | SL Premier Division | 6 | 2 | 2 | 0 | — | | 2 (Note: One appearance and one goal in Southern League Cup, one appearance in FA Trophy) | 1 | 10 | 3 |
| Chesham United | Total | | 66 | 14 | 3 | 0 | — | | 12 | 3 | 81 | 17 |
| Hayes & Yeading United (loan) | 2013–14 | Conference South | 6 | 0 | — | | — | | 0 | 0 | 6 | 0 |
| Dunstable Town | 2014–15 | SL Premier Division | 11 | 6 | — | | — | | 0 | 0 | 11 | 6 |
| Arlesey Town | 2014–15 | SL Premier Division | 9 | 2 | — | | — | | 0 | 0 | 9 | 2 |
| Biggleswade Town | 2015–16 | SL Premier Division | 37 | 16 | 3 | 0 | — | | 1 (Note: Appearance(s) in FA Trophy) | 0 | 41 | 16 |
| Biggleswade Town | 2016–17 | SL Premier Division | 31 | 23 | 1 | 0 | — | | 3 | 0 | 35 | 23 |
| Biggleswade Town | Total | | 68 | 39 | 4 | 0 | — | | 4 | 0 | 76 | 39 |
| Hertford Town (loan) | 2015–16 | SSML Premier Division | 2 | 2 | — | | — | | 0 | 0 | 2 | 2 |
| Barrow | 2016–17 | National League | 7 | 1 | — | | — | | 0 | 0 | 7 | 1 |
| Woking | 2017–18 | National League | 28 | 8 | 6 | 2 | — | | 1 | 0 | 35 | 10 |
| Ross County | 2017–18 | Scottish Premiership | 2 | 0 | 1 | 0 | — | | — | | 3 | 0 |
| Dover Athletic | 2018–19 | National League | 44 | 9 | 2 | 1 | — | | 3 | 1 | 49 | 11 |
| Dover Athletic | 2019–20 | National League | 36 | 16 | 2 | 0 | — | | 3 | 1 | 41 | 17 |
| Dover Athletic | Total | | 80 | 25 | 4 | 1 | — | | 6 | 2 | 90 | 28 |
| Stevenage | 2020–21 | League Two | 9 | 1 | 1 | 0 | 1 | 0 | 2 (Note: Appearance(s) in EFL Trophy) | 1 | 13 | 2 |
| Barnet (loan) | 2020–21 | National League | 5 | 1 | 0 | 0 | — | | 1 | 0 | 6 | 1 |
| Notts County (loan) | 2020–21 | National League | 12 | 1 | 0 | 0 | — | | 0 | 0 | 12 | 1 |
| Woking | 2021–22 | National League | 40 | 13 | 1 | 0 | — | | 1 | 0 | 42 | 13 |
| Aldershot Town | 2022–23 | National League | 28 | 14 | 0 | 0 | — | | 2 | 2 | 30 | 16 |
| Dagenham & Redbridge | 2022–23 | National League | 18 | 9 | — | | — | | — | | 18 | 9 |
| Dagenham & Redbridge | 2023–24 | National League | 28 | 16 | 1 | 0 | — | | 1 | 0 | 30 | 16 |
| Dagenham & Redbridge | Total | | 46 | 25 | 1 | 0 | — | | 1 | 0 | 48 | 25 |
| Braintree Town | 2024–25 | National League | 21 | 2 | 2 | 1 | — | | 2 (Note: Appearance(s) in National League Cup) | 2 | 25 | 5 |
| Woking | 2024–25 | National League | 23 | 5 | — | | — | | 4 | 2 | 27 | 7 |
| Woking | 2025–26 | National League | 2 | 0 | 0 | 0 | — | | 1 (Note: One appearance in National League Cup) | 0 | 3 | 0 |
| Woking | Total | | 25 | 5 | 0 | 0 | — | | 5 | 2 | 30 | 7 |
| Chelmsford City (loan) | 2025–26 | National League South | 3 | 0 | 0 | 0 | — | | 0 | 0 | 3 | 0 |
| Eastleigh | 2025–26 | National League | 9 | 1 | — | | — | | — | | 9 | 1 |
| Career total | | | 591 | 189 | 29 | 5 | 1 | 0 | 45 | 13 | 666 | 207 |
