= Jack Smith (footballer, born 2001) =

English association football player

Personal information
- Full name: Jack Justin Smith
- Date of birth: 15 September 2001 (age 25)
- Place of birth: Hertford, England
- Position: Defensive midfielder

Team information
- Current team: Bishop's Stortford

Youth career
- –2019: Stevenage

Senior career*
Years	Team	Apps	(Gls)
2019–2023	Stevenage	29	(0)
2020	→ Braintree Town (loan)	9	(0)
2022	→ Kettering Town (loan)	11	(0)
2022–2023	→ Dartford (loan)	31	(3)
2023	King's Lynn Town	20	(1)
2023–2024	Dartford	20	(0)
2024–2025	Enfield Town	19	(1)
2025–	Bishop's Stortford	39	(1)
- * Club domestic league appearances and goals as of 10:27, 26 August 2026 (UTC)

Jack Justin Smith (born 15 September 2001) is an English professional footballer who plays as a defensive midfielder for Southern League Premier Division Central club Bishop's Stortford.

A graduate of the Stevenage academy, Smith made his senior debut in August 2019, subsequently recording 40 Football League appearances. While at Stevenage, he had loan spells at Braintree Town, Kettering Town, and Dartford. He left Stevenage in May 2023, joining King's Lynn Town of the National League North the following month. Smith returned to Dartford in December 2023, before spending the 2024–25 season with Enfield Town. He signed for Bishop's Stortford in July 2025.

== Career ==
=== Stevenage ===
Smith began his career in the Stevenage youth academy, joining the first team for their pre-season tour of Jersey and featuring in several pre-season friendlies ahead of the 2019–20 season. He made his first-team debut as an 81st-minute substitute in a 1–0 home defeat to Bradford City on 20 August 2019, and after two senior appearances, signed his first professional contract on 28 August 2019. Smith joined National League South club Braintree Town on loan on 11 January 2020, making nine appearances during a spell that was extended to two months.

The 2020–21 season marked Smith's breakthrough season, as he made 30 appearances in all competitions and was named the club's Young Player of the Year. After featuring eight times during the first half of the 2021–22 season, he joined National League North club Kettering Town on loan for the remainder of the campaign on 18 February 2022, making 11 appearances. He joined National League South club Dartford on an initial one-month loan on 22 September 2022, which was later extended for the rest of the 2022–23 season. He made 35 appearances and scored three goals as Dartford reached the National League South play-off semi-finals. Smith was released by Stevenage in May 2023.

=== Non-League ===
Smith signed for King's Lynn Town of the National League North on 24 June 2023. He made 21 appearances and scored once during the first half of the season before rejoining Dartford on 29 December 2023. Smith made 25 appearances during his second spell with the club. He joined fellow National League South club Enfield Town on 10 June 2024, making 23 appearances and scoring once in a 4–2 defeat to Aveley. Having not featured beyond February 2025, he left the club at the end of the season. Smith signed for Southern League Premier Division Central club Bishop's Stortford on 31 July 2025 following a successful trial during pre-season.

== Style of play ==
Smith has been described as "an all-action defensive midfielder".

== Career statistics ==
As of match played 22 August 2026

Appearances and goals by club, season and competition
Club	Season	League			FA Cup		EFL Cup		Other		Total	
Club	Season	Division	Apps	Goals	Apps	Goals	Apps	Goals	Apps	Goals	Apps	Goals
Stevenage	2019–20	League Two	1	0	0	0	0	0	1 (Note: Appearance(s) in EFL Trophy)	0	2	0
Stevenage	2020–21	League Two	25	0	2	0	0	0	3	0	30	0
Stevenage	2021–22	League Two	3	0	0	0	2	0	3	0	8	0
Stevenage	2022–23	League Two	0	0	0	0	0	0	0	0	0	0
Stevenage	Total		29	0	2	0	2	0	7	0	40	0
Braintree Town (loan)	2019–20	National League South	9	0	—		—		—		9	0
Kettering Town (loan)	2021–22	National League North	11	0	—		—		—		11	0
Dartford (loan)	2022–23	National League South	31	3	—		—		4 (Note: One appearance in FA Trophy; one appearance in London Senior Cup; one appearance and one goal in Kent Senior Cup; one appearance in 2023 National League South play-offs)	1	35	4
King's Lynn Town	2023–24	National League North	20	1	0	0	—		1 (Note: Appearance in FA Trophy)	0	21	1
Dartford	2023–24	National League South	20	0	—		—		5 (Note: Three appearances in London Senior Cup; two appearances in Kent Senior Cup)	0	25	0
Enfield Town	2024–25	National League South	19	1	1	0	—		3 (Note: One appearance in FA Trophy; one appearance in London Senior Cup; one appearance in Middlesex Senior Cup)	0	23	1
Bishop's Stortford	2025–26	Southern League Premier Division Central	35	1	3	0	—		7 (Note: Three appearances in FA Trophy; four appearances and one goal in Herts Senior Cup)	1	45	2
Bishop's Stortford	2026–27	Southern League Premier Division Central	4	0	0	0	—		0	0	4	0
Bishop's Stortford	Total		39	1	3	0	0	0	7	0	49	2
Career total			178	6	6	0	2	0	27	2	213	8
