= Luis Fernandez (footballer, born 2001) =

English association football player

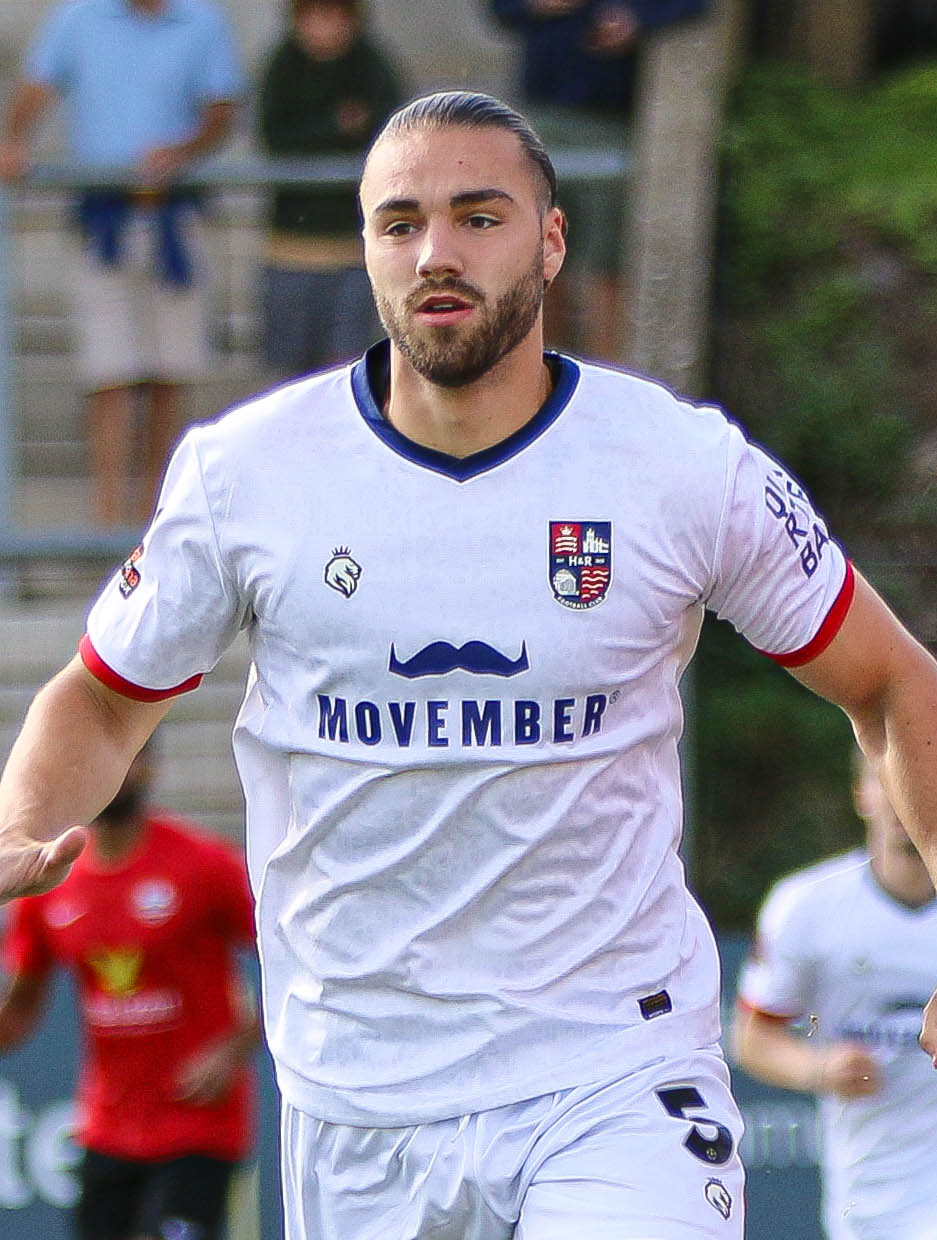
- Fernandez playing for Hampton & Richmond Borough in September 2023

Personal information
- Full name: Luis Theo Fernandez
- Date of birth: 28 September 2001 (age 25)
- Place of birth: Enfield, England
- Height: 1.93 m (6 ft 4 in)
- Position: Centre-back

Team information
- Current team: Hampton & Richmond Borough
- Number: 5

Youth career
- 2015–2019: Stevenage

Senior career*
Years	Team	Apps	(Gls)
2019–2022	Stevenage	5	(0)
2020	→ Oxford City (loan)	8	(0)
2021	→ Oxford City (loan)	2	(0)
2021–2022	→ King's Lynn Town (loan)	22	(1)
2022–2024	Hampton & Richmond Borough	68	(8)
2024–2026	Eastleigh	52	(1)
2026–	Hampton & Richmond Borough	18	(1)
- * Club domestic league appearances and goals as of 10:11, 26 August 2026 (UTC)

Luis Theo Fernandez (born 28 September 2001) is an English professional footballer who plays as a centre-back for National League South club Hampton & Richmond Borough.

A product of the Stevenage academy, Fernandez made his first-team debut for the club at the age of 17. He spent two spells on loan at Oxford City during the 2020–21 season before joining King's Lynn Town on loan for the following season. After leaving Stevenage in May 2022, he signed for Hampton & Richmond Borough, where he made 73 appearances and scored eight goals over two seasons. Fernandez joined Eastleigh for an undisclosed fee in May 2024, making 57 appearances, before returning to Hampton & Richmond in February 2026.

== Career ==
=== Stevenage ===
Fernandez joined Stevenage at the age of 13, progressing through the club's youth academy. Following Ben Wilmot's promotion to the Stevenage first team, Fernandez, then a regular in the under-16 team, was selected to play at centre-back in an FA Youth Cup tie against Middlesbrough's under-18 team, featuring for the full 90 minutes in a 2–1 defeat. Academy coach Stephen Payne stated that Fernandez's late inclusion and composure under pressure would serve him well in his professional career.

Aged 17 and in his second year as a scholar, Fernandez made his senior debut in Stevenage's 2–1 EFL Cup defeat to Southend United on 13 August 2019, earning praise from manager Dino Maamria for what he described as "a Man of the Match performance". He signed his first professional contract on 28 August 2019 and went on to make eight senior appearances during the 2019–20 season.

==== Loan spells ====
After making one first-team appearance for Stevenage during the opening month of the 2020–21 season, Fernandez joined National League South club Oxford City on a three-month loan on 9 October 2020. He made his debut as a 60th-minute substitute in a 1–1 away draw with Chelmsford City on 10 October 2020, and went on to make 11 appearances in all competitions during the loan spell. Fernandez was recalled by Stevenage on 24 December 2020 due to injuries and suspensions within the first-team squad.

He rejoined Oxford City on 21 January 2021 for the remainder of the season, making three further appearances before the National League South campaign was curtailed on 24 February 2021 owing to restrictions associated with the COVID-19 pandemic. Fernandez remained with Oxford City until the conclusion of their FA Trophy run, which ended with a quarter-final defeat to Notts County on 27 February 2021. He joined National League club King's Lynn Town on a season-long loan on 12 July 2021. He scored his first senior goal in a 2–2 away draw with Solihull Moors on 5 March 2022, and ended the season with 24 appearances in all competitions. He was released by Stevenage following the expiry of his contract in May 2022.

=== Hampton & Richmond Borough ===
Fernandez signed for National League South club Hampton & Richmond Borough on 25 May 2022. Injury disrupted his opening months with the club, scoring his first goal in a 3–2 defeat at Dulwich Hamlet on 9 November 2022. He went on to make 27 appearances during the season, scoring five goals. In 2023–24, he made 46 appearances, scored three goals and also captained the team in the final match of the season. In April 2024, he was named Players’ Player of the Season, with manager Alan Julian commending his professionalism, resilience, and positive impact on the team.

=== Eastleigh ===
Fernandez signed for National League club Eastleigh on 13 May 2024 for an undisclosed fee. In January 2025, he was appointed as the club's Community Player Ambassador, a role involving engagement with local schools, charities, and youth development initiatives to promote sport and community involvement. Fernandez made 36 appearances in all competitions in his debut season, as Eastleigh finished 13th in the National League.

=== Return to Hampton & Richmond Borough ===
Fernandez returned to National League South club Hampton & Richmond Borough for an undisclosed fee on 10 February 2026, having left Eastleigh to seek regular first-team football.

== Style of play ==
Primarily deployed as a centre-back, Fernandez has described himself as a front-foot defender who values blocking shots and strong tackling, modelling his game on John Terry and Nemanja Vidić. He plays with a focus on physicality, anticipation, and defensive discipline, with his style characterised as pragmatic and robust. During his time at Hampton & Richmond Borough, he was also noted for his attacking threat from set-pieces.

== Career statistics ==
As of match played 22 August 2026

Appearances and goals by club, season and competition
Club	Season	League			FA Cup		EFL Cup		Other		Total	
Club	Season	Division	Apps	Goals	Apps	Goals	Apps	Goals	Apps	Goals	Apps	Goals
Stevenage	2019–20	League Two	4	0	1	0	1	0	2 (Note: Appearance(s) in EFL Trophy)	0	8	0
Stevenage	2020–21	League Two	1	0	0	0	0	0	1	0	2	0
Stevenage	2021–22	League Two	0	0	0	0	0	0	0	0	0	0
Stevenage	Total		5	0	1	0	1	0	3	0	10	0
Oxford City (loan)	2020–21	National League South	10	0	3	0	—		2 (Note: Appearance(s) in FA Trophy)	0	15	0
King's Lynn Town (loan)	2021–22	National League	22	1	2	0	—		0	0	24	1
Hampton & Richmond Borough	2022–23	National League South	26	5	0	0	—		1	0	27	5
Hampton & Richmond Borough	2023–24	National League South	42	3	2	0	—		2	0	46	3
Hampton & Richmond Borough	Total		68	8	2	0	0	0	3	0	73	8
Eastleigh	2024–25	National League	33	0	1	0	—		2	0	36	0
Eastleigh	2025–26	National League	19	1	2	0	—		0	0	21	1
Eastleigh	Total		52	1	3	0	0	0	2	0	57	1
Hampton & Richmond Borough	2025–26	National League South	15	0	—		—		0	0	15	0
Hampton & Richmond Borough	2026–27	National League South	3	1	0	0	—		0	0	3	1
Hampton & Richmond Borough	Total		18	1	0	0	0	0	0	0	18	1
Career total			175	11	11	0	1	0	10	0	197	11
