= Elliott List =

English footballer (born 1997)

Personal information
- Full name: Elliott Ricardo Wignal-List
- Date of birth: 12 May 1997 (age 29)
- Place of birth: Camberwell, England
- Height: 5 ft 10 in (1.78 m)
- Position: Winger

Team information
- Current team: Northampton Town
- Number: 10

Youth career
- 2013–2015: Crystal Palace

Senior career*
| Years | Team | Apps | (Gls) |
| 2015–2019 | Gillingham | 85 | (7) |
| 2015 | → Braintree Town (loan) | 0 | (0) |
| 2019–2025 | Stevenage | 171 | (28) |
| 2025– | Northampton Town | 40 | (3) |
- * Club domestic league appearances and goals as of 12 November 2026 (UTC)

Elliott Ricardo Wignal-List (born 12 May 1997) is an English professional footballer who plays as a winger for EFL League Two club Northampton Town.

List started his career in the youth academy at Crystal Palace. He was released by Palace and subsequently earned his first professional contract at Gillingham in May 2015. Prior to making any first-team appearances for Gillingham, he was loaned out for a month to National League club Braintree Town in October 2015. List played 102 times for Gillingham over the next four years, before signing for League Two club Stevenage in August 2019. He spent six years at Stevenage, where he scored 35 goals in 201 appearances and was part of the squad to earn promotion into League One during the 2022–23 season. List signed for League One club Northampton Town in June 2025.

== Career ==
=== Gillingham ===
List began his career in the Crystal Palace youth academy. He was released by Crystal Palace at the end of the 2014–15 season. List subsequently went on trial with Gillingham and played in a number of development matches, earning a one-year professional contract with the club in May 2015. Having made no appearances for the first team during the opening months of the 2015–16 season, List was loaned to National League club Braintree Town on 30 October 2015. He made his debut for Braintree in a 2–0 victory against Harlow Town in the FA Cup fourth qualifying round. Both of List's appearances during the one-month loan agreement for Braintree came in the FA Cup. On his return to his parent club, List made his first-team debut on 26 December 2015, coming on as a substitute in a 3–1 victory against Swindon Town at the County Ground. He made six first-team appearances for Gillingham in League One throughout the remainder of the season, all of which were from the substitutes' bench. List signed a further one-year contract extension with Gillingham in June 2016.

List featured predominantly as a substitute during the 2016–17 season, making 19 appearances in all competitions, of which 14 were as a substitute. He remained at Gillingham for the 2017–18 season, playing 28 times during a season that saw Gillingham finish in 17th place in League One. The season also marked his first professional goal as he came on as a second-half substitute to score a stoppage-time equaliser in a 1–1 draw away at Bristol Rovers on 28 April 2018. He signed a two-year contract extension with Gillingham on 7 June 2018. The 2018–19 season would serve as a breakthrough season for List in terms of regular starting appearances. He scored his first goal of the season courtesy of a "stunning solo goal" in a 1–1 draw against Coventry City on 25 August 2018. List scored the only goal of the game as Gillingham secured a 1–0 home victory over Premier League club Cardiff City in the FA Cup third round on 5 January 2019. He made 45 appearances in all competitions, scoring eight goals, as Gillingham finished the season in mid-table in League One.

=== Stevenage ===
List signed for Stevenage of League Two on 31 August 2019, joining the club for an undisclosed fee. He debuted on the same day as his signing was announced, playing the first 63 minutes in a 2–2 draw at home to Macclesfield Town. Having scored 11 goals during the 2020–21 season, finishing as the club's top goalscorer for the season, List was named Stevenage's Player of the Year in May 2021. List signed a contract extension with Stevenage on 28 April 2021, keeping him at the club for a further two seasons. He scored 13 goals in 45 appearances during the 2021–22 season. List suffered a knee injury in Stevenage's opening match of the 2022–23 season against Tranmere Rovers on 30 July 2022, ultimately ruling him out for the season. Following the club's promotion into League One, List signed a contract extension on 24 May 2023, a one-year agreement with the option of a further year. He scored four times in 36 appearances during the 2023–24 season and four times in 44 appearances the following season. During his six years at Stevenage, List made 201 appearances and scored 35 goals.

=== Northampton Town ===
After negotiations with Stevenage regarding a new contract, List signed a two-year contract with fellow League One club Northampton Town on 19 June 2025.

== Style of play ==
Deployed predominantly as a winger, List's pace and energy have been highlighted as strengths. Upon signing for Northampton Town in June 2025, manager Kevin Nolan stated "He is a dynamic forward who can play in a number of the attacking positions and brings real energy and attacking threat". List has been praised for his work ethic off the ball and described as being an adaptable forward who can stretch defences.

== Career statistics ==
As of match played 2 December 2025

Appearances and goals by club, season and competition
| Season | Club | League | | | FA Cup | | EFL Cup | | Other | | Total | |
| Season | Club | Division | Apps | Goals | Apps | Goals | Apps | Goals | Apps | Goals | Apps | Goals |
|---|---|---|---|---|---|---|---|---|---|---|---|---|
| Gillingham | 2015–16 | League One | 6 | 0 | 0 | 0 | 0 | 0 | 0 | 0 | 6 | 0 |
| Gillingham | 2016–17 | League One | 15 | 0 | 1 | 0 | 1 | 0 | 2 (Note: Appearance(s) and goal(s) in EFL Trophy) | 0 | 19 | 0 |
| Gillingham | 2017–18 | League One | 23 | 2 | 2 | 0 | 0 | 0 | 3 | 0 | 28 | 2 |
| Gillingham | 2018–19 | League One | 37 | 5 | 5 | 2 | 0 | 0 | 3 | 1 | 45 | 8 |
| Gillingham | 2019–20 | League One | 4 | 0 | 0 | 0 | 0 | 0 | 0 | 0 | 4 | 0 |
| Gillingham | Total | | 85 | 7 | 8 | 2 | 1 | 0 | 8 | 1 | 102 | 10 |
| Braintree Town (loan) | 2015–16 | National League | 0 | 0 | 2 | 0 | 0 | 0 | 0 | 0 | 2 | 0 |
| Stevenage | 2019–20 | League Two | 21 | 2 | 2 | 1 | 0 | 0 | 4 | 0 | 27 | 3 |
| Stevenage | 2020–21 | League Two | 44 | 9 | 2 | 1 | 1 | 1 | 1 | 0 | 48 | 11 |
| Stevenage | 2021–22 | League Two | 37 | 9 | 3 | 1 | 2 | 2 | 3 | 1 | 45 | 13 |
| Stevenage | 2022–23 | League Two | 1 | 0 | 0 | 0 | 0 | 0 | 0 | 0 | 1 | 0 |
| Stevenage | 2023–24 | League One | 29 | 4 | 3 | 0 | 1 | 0 | 3 | 0 | 36 | 4 |
| Stevenage | 2024–25 | League One | 39 | 4 | 2 | 0 | 0 | 0 | 3 | 0 | 44 | 4 |
| Stevenage | Total | | 171 | 28 | 12 | 3 | 4 | 3 | 14 | 1 | 201 | 35 |
| Northampton Town | 2025–26 | League One | 11 | 1 | 1 | 0 | 1 | 0 | 4 | 1 | 17 | 2 |
| Career total | | | 267 | 36 | 23 | 5 | 6 | 3 | 26 | 3 | 322 | 47 |

== Honours ==
Stevenage

- EFL League Two runner-up: 2022–23

Individual

- Stevenage Player of the Year: 2020–21
