= Sam Tinubu =

English association football player

Personal information
- Full name: Samuel Ayomide Tinubu
- Date of birth: 28 September 2004 (age 22)
- Place of birth: Enfield, London, England
- Position: Midfielder

Youth career
- –2021: Stevenage

Senior career*
Years	Team	Apps	(Gls)
2021–2023	Stevenage	1	(0)
2023	→ Biggleswade Town (loan)	18	(3)
2024	Bedford Town	4	(0)
2024–2025	Biggleswade Town	4	(0)
2025–2026	Hadley	2	(0)
2026	AFC Totton	3	(0)
- * Club domestic league appearances and goals as of 22:41, 26 August 2026 (UTC)

Samuel Ayomide Tinubu (born 28 September 2004) is an English professional footballer who plays as a midfielder.

A graduate of the Stevenage academy, Tinubu made his professional debut in October 2021, becoming the club's youngest Football League debutant. He spent the second half of the 2022–23 season on loan at Biggleswade Town before being released in May 2023. Tinubu subsequently had brief spells in the Southern Football League with Bedford Town, Biggleswade Town and Hadley, before joining National League South club AFC Totton in February 2026.

== Career ==
=== Stevenage ===
Tinubu began his career at Stevenage, signing a full-time academy scholarship in July 2021 and his first professional contract on 2 October 2021. He made his first-team debut, his only appearance for the club, in a 3–0 away defeat to Oldham Athletic on 16 October 2021, coming on as an 80th-minute substitute in the match. In doing so, he became the club's youngest Football League debutant at 17 years and 18 days, surpassing Liam Smyth's previous record.

He joined Southern League Division One Central club Biggleswade Town on an initial one-month loan on 27 January 2023, reuniting with former Stevenage academy manager Robbie O'Keefe. Tinubu scored his first senior goal in a 4–2 win over Ware on 14 February 2023, after which the loan was extended until the end of the 2022–23 season. He made 19 appearances during his time there, scoring three goals. He was released by Stevenage in May 2023.

=== Spells in non-League ===
Tinubu did not make a competitive appearance during the 2023–24 season. He joined Southern League Premier Division Central club Bedford Town in September 2024, making four substitute appearances before returning to Biggleswade Town a month later. He made six appearances during his second spell with the club but did not feature after January 2025. After making two appearances at Southern League Division One Central club Hadley in November 2025, Tinubu joined National League South club AFC Totton on 21 February 2026, making three appearances.

== Career statistics ==
As of match played 10 March 2026

Appearances and goals by club, season and competition
Club	Season	League			FA Cup		EFL Cup		Other		Total	
Club	Season	Division	Apps	Goals	Apps	Goals	Apps	Goals	Apps	Goals	Apps	Goals
Stevenage	2021–22	League Two	1	0	0	0	0	0	0	0	1	0
Stevenage	2022–23	League Two	0	0	0	0	0	0	0	0	0	0
Stevenage	Total		1	0	0	0	0	0	0	0	1	0
Biggleswade Town (loan)	2022–23	Southern League Division One Central	18	3	0	0	—		1 (Note: Appearance in Bedfordshire Senior Cup)	0	19	3
Bedford Town	2024–25	Southern League Premier Division Central	4	0	0	0	—		0	0	4	0
Biggleswade Town	2024–25	Southern League Premier Division Central	4	0	0	0	—		2 (Note: Appearances in FA Trophy)	0	6	0
Hadley	2025–26	Southern League Division One Central	2	0	0	0	—		0	0	2	0
AFC Totton	2025–26	National League South	3	0	—		—		0	0	3	0
Career total			32	3	0	0	0	0	3	0	35	3
