= Andronicos Georgiou =

English footballer

Personal information
- Full name: Andronicos Georgiou
- Date of birth: 28 October 1999 (age 26)
- Place of birth: London, England
- Height: 5 ft 11 in (1.80 m)
- Positions: Midfielder; forward

Team information
- Current team: Farnham Town
- Number: 18

Youth career
- 2012–2017: Stevenage

Senior career*
Years	Team	Apps	(Gls)
2017–2020	Stevenage	3	(0)
2019	→ Kings Langley (loan)	16	(4)
2019	→ St Albans City (loan)	4	(0)
2019–2020	→ Hendon (loan)	5	(0)
2020–2021	Wycombe Wanderers	0	(0)
2021–2022	Haringey Borough	26	(5)
2022–2023	Kings Langley	14	(6)
2023	St Albans City	12	(1)
2023–2024	Braintree Town	5	(0)
2024	Royston Town	2	(0)
2024–2025	Wingate & Finchley	28	(4)
2025	Hashtag United	9	(2)
2025–2026	Farnham Town	2	(0)
- * Club domestic league appearances and goals as of 16:56, 7 March 2026 (UTC)

Andronicos Georgiou (born 28 October 1999) is an English professional footballer who plays as a midfielder or forward for National League South club Farnham Town.

== Career ==
Georgiou joined Stevenage's academy aged 13, and progressed through the youth ranks at the club. He was a regular starter for the club's U18 side during the 2016–17 season, and subsequently signed his first professional contract with the Hertfordshire side in April 2017.

Ahead of the 2017–18 season, having trained with the first-team, Georgiou scored a hat-trick in a 4–4 pre-season friendly draw away at Biggleswade Town. He made his professional debut on 3 October 2017, coming on as a 62nd-minute substitute in Stevenage's 0–0 draw away at Milton Keynes Dons in the EFL Trophy. Georgiou made his Football League debut four days later, appearing as a late second-half substitute as Stevenage fell to a 1–0 away defeat to Crewe Alexandra.

Having made three appearances for Stevenage during the first half of the 2018–19 season, Stevenage managed Dino Maamria stated that Georgiou needed "to be playing week in week out to develop his craft". He subsequently joined Southern League Premier Division South club Kings Langley on loan on 18 January 2019. Alongside the loan move, Stevenage also stated that they had triggered an option to extend Georgiou's contract by a further year. He scored on his debut for Kings Langley in a 2–2 draw away at Weymouth a day after joining the club, scoring a 94th-minute penalty in the match to restore parity. Georgiou made 16 appearances during the loan spell, scoring four times.

Georgiou went on trial with Championship club Middlesbrough in July 2019. He played and scored for Middlesbrough's U23 team in a 7–1 victory over Bishop Auckland, although no move materialised.

On 19 September 2019, Georgiou was loaned out to St Albans City until January 2020. However, he was recalled on 15 November 2019 and instead loaned out to Hendon, also until January 2020. The deal was later extended until the end of the season.

On 29 September 2020, Georgiou was signed by Wycombe Wanderers following the launch of a 'B Team' Programme. On 12 May 2021 it was announced that he would leave Wycombe at the end of the season.

In October 2021, Georgiou signed for Haringey Borough. In December 2022, he returned to his former club, Kings Langley.

After a spell back at St Albans City, Georgiou joined Braintree Town in December 2023. After just five appearances, Georgiou left the club in January 2024.

On 2 February 2024, following his departure from Braintree, Georgiou joined Royston Town.

In September 2025, Georgiou joined Southern League Premier Division South club Farnham Town. On 6 May 2026, it was announced that Georgiou would leave the club at the end of his deal in June. He left the club following just two league appearances during an injury-hit campaign.

== Personal life ==
Georgiou is of Greek Cypriot descent

== Career statistics ==
As of match played 3 March 2026

Appearances and goals by club, season and competition
Club	Season	League			FA Cup		EFL Cup		Other		Total	
Club	Season	Division	Apps	Goals	Apps	Goals	Apps	Goals	Apps	Goals	Apps	Goals
Stevenage	2017–18	League Two	2	0	1	0	0	0	2 (Note: Appearances in the EFL Trophy)	0	5	0
Stevenage	2018–19	League Two	1	0	0	0	0	0	2	0	3	0
Stevenage	2019–20	League Two	0	0	0	0	0	0	1	0	1	0
Stevenage	Total		3	0	1	0	0	0	5	0	9	0
Kings Langley (loan)	2018–19	Southern League Premier Division South	16	4	—		—		—		16	4
St Albans City (loan)	2019–20	National League South	4	0	2	1	—		0	0	6	1
Hendon (loan)	2019–20	Southern League Premier Division South	5	0	—		—		1 (Note: Appearance in the Southern League Cup)	0	6	0
Wycombe Wanderers	2020–21	Championship	0	0	0	0	0	0	0	0	0	0
Haringey Borough	2021–22	Isthmian League Premier Division	17	4	—		—		1 (Note: Appearance in the FA Trophy)	0	18	4
Haringey Borough	2022–23	Isthmian League Premier Division	9	0	1	0	—		0	0	10	0
Haringey Borough	Total		26	4	1	0	—		1	0	28	4
Kings Langley	2022–23	Southern League Premier Division Central	14	6	—		—		—		14	6
St Albans City	2023–24	National League South	12	1	2	0	—		0	0	14	1
Braintree Town	2023–24	National League South	5	0	—		—		—		5	0
Royston Town	2023–24	Southern League Premier Division Central	2	0	—		—		—		2	0
Wingate & Finchley	2024–25	Isthmian League Premier Division	28	4	2	1	—		1	0	31	5
Hashtag United	2024–25	Isthmian League Premier Division	9	2	—		—		—		9	2
Farnham Town	2025–26	Southern League Premier Division South	2	0	0	0	—		0	0	2	0
Career total			126	21	8	2	0	0	8	0	142	23
