= Jason Cowley (footballer) =

English footballer

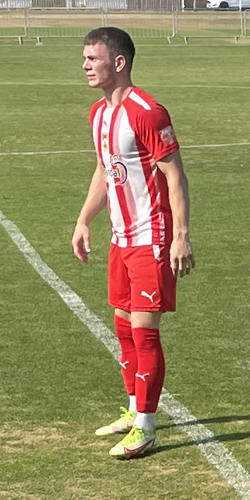
- Cowley playing for Stourbridge in August 2022.

Personal information
- Full name: Jason John Cowley
- Date of birth: 9 October 1995 (age 31)
- Position: Striker

Team information
- Current team: Halesowen Town

Senior career*
Years	Team	Apps	(Gls)
2015–2016	Redditch Borough	19	(26)
2016–2017	Redditch United	2	(0)
2016–2017	→ Bromsgrove Sporting (dual registration)	15	(11)
2017–2019	Bromsgrove Sporting	100	(90)
2018	→ AFC Telford United (dual registration)	0	(0)
2019–2020	Stevenage	18	(2)
2020	→ Solihull Moors (loan)	6	(0)
2020	Macclesfield Town	0	(0)
2020–2021	Bromsgrove Sporting	4	(1)
2021	→ Kidderminster Harriers (loan)	3	(1)
2021–2023	Stourbridge	52	(31)
2023–2025	Hereford	62	(14)
2025–	Halesowen Town	3	(2)
- * Club domestic league appearances and goals as of 12:06, 19 August 2025 (UTC)

Jason John Cowley (born 9 October 1995) is an English semi-professional footballer who plays as a striker for Southern League Premier Division Central club Halesowen Town.

== Career ==
Cowley began his career with Redditch Borough. During his time at Redditch Borough, Cowley scored 26 goals in 25 games as the club won the 2015–16 Midland League Division Three, earning a move to Redditch United. After struggling for game time, Cowley signed for Bromsgrove Sporting, initially on a dual registration. In his first season with the club, Cowley scored 42 goals in 42 games in all competitions. During his time with Bromsgrove Sporting, Cowley helped the team to secure three promotions in three seasons, and scored 74 goals in two seasons. In March 2019, in a game against Corby Town, he scored a "spectacular" goal for the club, leading to calls for Cowley to be nominated for the FIFA Puskás Award. He signed for Stevenage in May 2019. He went on join Solihull Moors for a month long loan in January 2020.

He was released by Stevenage at the end of the 2019–20 season.

Following his release, Cowley played in a friendly with previous club Bromsgrove Sporting. He scored once in this match.

On 14 September 2020, Cowley signed for National League club Macclesfield Town. However, on 16 September the club was wound up due to debts. Cowley later returned to Southern League Premier Division Central side Bromsgrove Sporting, signing for them on 2 October 2020. On 1 January 2021, Cowley joined National League North side Kidderminster Harriers on a one-month loan deal.

He signed for Stourbridge in June 2021.

On 12 June 2023, Cowley signed for National League North club Hereford for an undisclosed fee. He was top goalscorer for Hereford during the 2023–24 season with 12 goals across all competitions, despite missing a large chunk of the season due to injury. He signed a contract extension in May 2024 to keep him at Hereford until the end of the 2024–25 season. In May 2025, he was offered an extension to remain at the club, but announced on 5 May on X that he was leaving.

After leaving Hereford, on 2 June 2025, Cowley signed for Southern League Premier Division Central club Halesowen Town.

== Career statistics ==
As of match played 16 August 2025

Appearances and goals by club, season and competition
Club	Season	League			FA Cup		League Cup		Other		Total	
Club	Season	Division	Apps	Goals	Apps	Goals	Apps	Goals	Apps	Goals	Apps	Goals
Redditch Borough	2015–16	ML Division Three	18 (Note: Includes two appearances and three goals from expunged League fixtures against Badsey Rangers)	25	0	0	—		7 (Note: Four appearances and one goal in Midland Football League Challenge Vase; two appearances in Evesham Hospital Junior Cup; one appearance in Smedley Crooke Memorial Cup)	1	25	26
Redditch Borough	2016-17	ML Division Two	1	1	0	0	—		0	0	1	1
Redditch Borough	Total		19	26	0	0	—		7	1	26	27
Redditch United	2016–17	SL Premier Division	2	0	0	0	—		1 (Note: Appearance in Southern League Cup)	0	3	0
Bromsgrove Sporting (dual reg.)	2016–17	ML Division One	15	11	0	0	—		6 (Note: Five appearances and eight goals in FA Vase; one appearance in Smedley Crooke Memorial Cup)	8	21	19
Bromsgrove Sporting	2016–17	ML Division One	17	22	0	0	—		4 (Note: Three appearances and one goal in FA Vase;one appearance in Smedley Crooke Memorial Cup)	1	21	23
Bromsgrove Sporting	2017–18	ML Premier Division	35	28	2	0	—		10 (Note: Five appearances and three goal in FA Vase;three appearances and two goals in Midlands Football League Cup; one appearance in Birmingham Senior Cup; one appearance in Worcestershire Senior Urn.)	5	47	33
Bromsgrove Sporting	2018–19	SL Division One Central	33	29	1	0	—		4 (Note: Two appearances and three goals in Southern League Division One Central Playoffs;one appearance in Southern League Cup; one appearance in Worcestershire Senior Cup)	3	38	32
Bromsgrove Sporting	Total		100	90	3	0	—		24	17	127	107
AFC Telford United (dual reg.)	2018–19	National League North	0	0	0	0	—		0	0	0	0
Stevenage	2019–20	League Two	18	2	1	0	1	0	4 (Note: Appearances in EFL Trophy)	3	24	5
Solihull Moors (loan)	2019–20	National League	6	0	—		—		—		6	0
Macclesfield Town	2020–21	National League	0	0	0	0	—		0	0	0	0
Bromsgrove Sporting	2020–21	SL Premier Division Central	4	1	0	0	—		1 (Note: One appearance in FA Trophy)	0	5	1
Kidderminster Harriers (loan)	2020–21	National League North	3	1	—		—		—		3	1
Stourbridge	2021–22	SL Premier Division Central	13	7	0	0	—		4 (Note: Two appearances in the FA Trophy; two appearances and five goals in the Birmingham Senior Cup)	5	17	12
Stourbridge	2022–23	SL Premier Division Central	39	24	2	0	—		7 (Note: Two appearances, one goal in the FA Trophy; Five appearances, four goals in the Birmingham Senior Cup)	5	48	29
Stourbridge	Total		52	31	2	0	—		11	10	65	41
Hereford	2023–24	National League North	34	12	1	0	—		2 (Note: Appearance(s) in FA Trophy)	0	37	12
Hereford	2024–25	National League North	28	2	0	0	—		0	0	28	2
Hereford	Total		62	14	1	0	—		2	0	65	14
Halesowen Town	2025–26	SL Premier Division Central	3	2	0	0	—		0	0	3	2
Career total			269	167	7	0	1	0	50	31	327	198
