= Jamie Fielding (footballer) =

English footballer

Personal information
- Full name: Jamie Fielding
- Date of birth: 18 August 1999 (age 27)
- Place of birth: Hastings, England
- Height: 1.88 m (6 ft 2 in)
- Position: Defender

Team information
- Current team: Ebbsfleet United

Youth career
- Eastbourne Borough
- Hastings United

Senior career*
Years	Team	Apps	(Gls)
2017–2019	Hastings United	36	(2)
2017	→ Little Common (loan)	10	(1)
2019–2021	Stevenage	3	(0)
2019–2020	→ St Albans City (loan)	14	(0)
2020–2021	→ Braintree Town (loan)	7	(0)
2021	Wealdstone	0	(0)
2021– 2025	Tonbridge Angels	103	(6)
2025–	Ebbsfleet United	0	(0)
- * Club domestic league appearances and goals

Jamie Fielding (born 18 August 1999) is an English professional footballer who plays as a defender for Ebbsfleet United.

== Career ==
=== Hastings United ===
Born in Hastings, Fielding progressed through Eastbourne Borough's youth academy before signing with Isthmian League club Hastings United in 2017. He joined Little Common of the Southern Combination League Division One on loan to gain first-team experience during the latter stages of 2017. He returned to his parent club and made his first-team debut for Hastings at the age of 18, coming on as a 90th-minute substitute in the club's 1–0 victory over Walton Casuals on 17 March 2018. Fielding scored his first goal for the club in a 3–1 win away at Chipstead on 7 April 2018. He went on to make eight appearances during the remainder of the 2017–18 season. The 2018–19 season would prove to be Fielding's breakthrough season in terms of regular first-team appearances; playing 35 times in all competitions, scoring two goals. He was named Hasting United's Young Player of the Year at the club's end-of-season awards ceremony. Fielding went on a one-week trial with Premier League club Leicester City, although no move materialised.

=== Stevenage ===
Fielding received contract offers from Forest Green Rovers and Stevenage of League Two in May 2019. He opted to sign for Stevenage on 22 May 2019. Fielding stated Stevenage's high level training facilities were a decisive factor in choosing to sign for the club. He made his debut in the club's first game of the 2019–20 season, playing the first-half in a 2–0 away defeat to Salford City on 3 August 2019. Having made six appearances during the first three months of the season, Fielding joined National League South club St Albans City on a three-month loan agreement on 15 November 2019. The loan was extended for the remainder of the season on 17 January 2020. Fielding made 15 appearances in all competitions during the loan spell. He joined Braintree Town of the National League South on loan in September 2020.

=== Wealdstone ===
On 5 April 2021, Fielding signed for National League side Wealdstone on a short term deal.

=== Tonbridge Angels ===
He moved to Tonbridge Angels in September 2021.

=== Ebbsfleet United ===
In Summer 2025, he made a move to National League South side Ebbsfleet United.

== Career statistics ==
As of match played 29 April 2023

Appearances and goals by club, season and competition
Club	Season	League			FA Cup		League Cup		Other		Total	
Club	Season	Division	Apps	Goals	Apps	Goals	Apps	Goals	Apps	Goals	Apps	Goals
Hastings United	2017–18	Isthmian League South Division	8	1	0	0	—		0	0	8	1
Hastings United	2018–19	Isthmian League South East Division	28	1	3	0	—		4< (Note: One appearance in FA Trophy; one appearance in Sussex Senior Challenge Cup; one appearance in Isthmian League South East Division Playoffs; one appearance and one goal in Alan Turvey Trophy.)	1	35	2
Hastings United	Total		36	2	3	0	—		4	1	43	3
Little Common (loan)	2017–18	Southern Combination League Division One	10	1	0	0	—		0	0	10	1
Stevenage	2019–20	League Two	3	0	0	0	0	0	3 (Note: Appearances in EFL Trophy.)	0	6	0
Stevenage	2020–21	League Two	0	0	0	0	0	0	0	0	0	0
Stevenage	Total		3	0	0	0	—		3	0	6	0
St Albans City (loan)	2019–20	National League South	14	0	0	0	—		1 (Note: Appearances in FA Trophy.)	0	15	0
Braintree Town (loan)	2020–21	National League South	7	0	0	0	—		0	0	7	0
Wealdstone	2020–21	National League	0	0	0	0	—		0	0	0	0
Tonbridge Angels	2021–22	National League South	24	0	0	0	—		3	0	27	0
Tonbridge Angels	2022–23	National League South	35	2	0	0	—		1	0	36	2
Tonbridge Angels	Total		59	2	0	0	—		4	0	63	2
Career total			129	5	3	0	0	0	12	1	144	6
