= William Appleyard =

William Appleyard may refer to:

- William Appleyard (MP) (died 1419), member of parliament for Norwich
- Bill Appleyard (1878–1958), English association (soccer) footballer of the 1900s
- Will Appleyard (born 1999), English footballer
