= Kane Smith =

English footballer (born 1996)

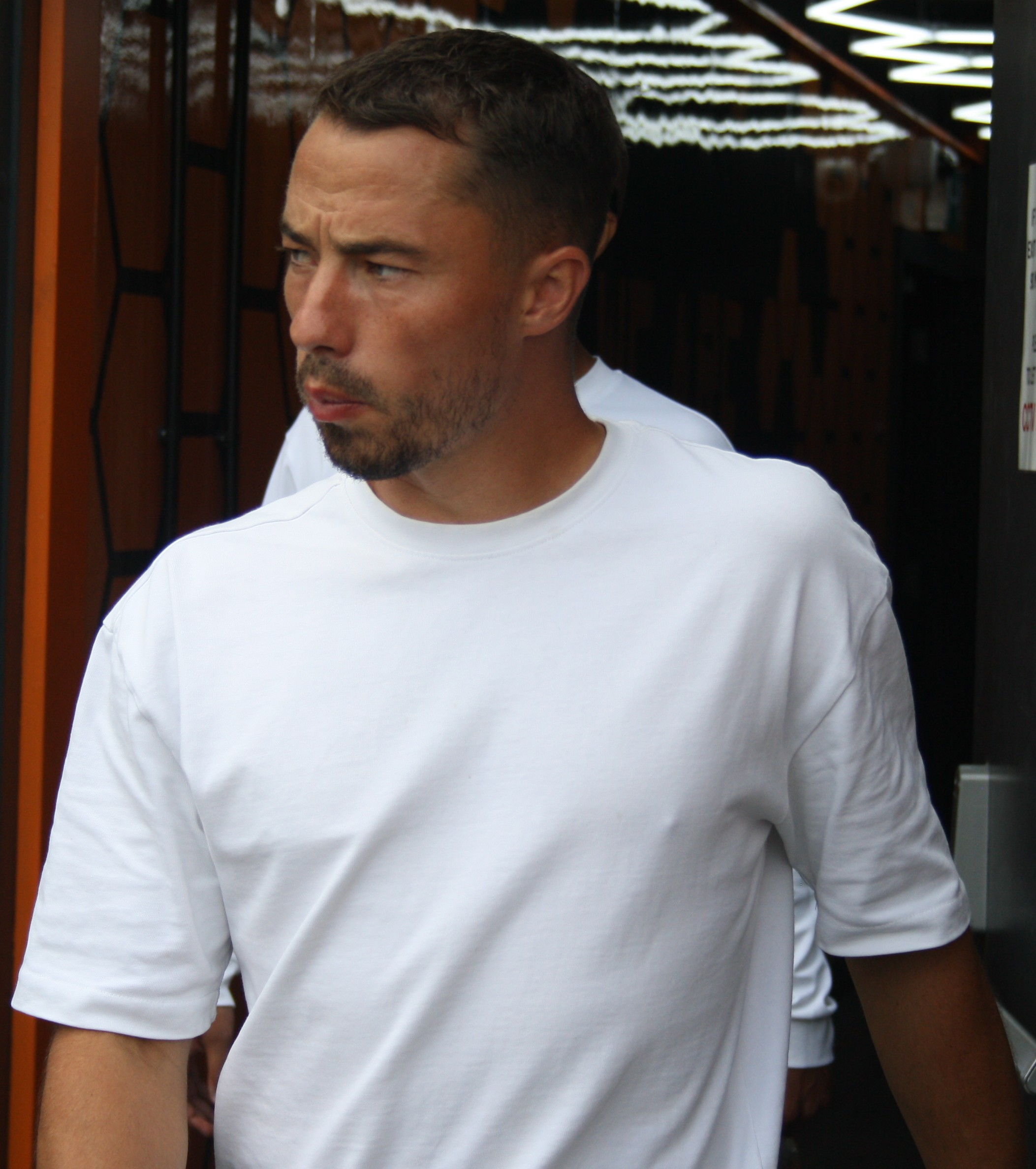

Personal information
- Full name: Kane John Smith
- Date of birth: 7 February 1996 (age 30)
- Place of birth: Luton, England
- Height: 1.75 m (5 ft 9 in)
- Position: Right-back

Team information
- Current team: Barnet
- Number: 18

Youth career
- –2014: Luton Town

Senior career*
Years	Team	Apps	(Gls)
2014	Biggleswade Town		
2014–2017	Hitchin Town	90	(7)
2017–2022	Boreham Wood	153	(15)
2022–2025	Stevenage	47	(1)
2025–	Barnet	32	(0)
- * Club domestic league appearances and goals as of 13:47, 22 November 2026 (UTC)

Kane John Smith (born 7 February 1996) is an English professional footballer who plays as a right-back for EFL League Two club Barnet.

A product of the Luton Town academy, Smith was released by his hometown club in 2014 and signed for Biggleswade Town. He joined Southern League Premier Division club Hitchin Town in December 2014 and made 123 appearances during his two-and-a-half years there. A transfer to Boreham Wood of the National League followed in July 2017. He spent five years at Boreham Wood, where he was a mainstay at right-back, making 181 appearances in all competitions. Smith signed for EFL League Two club Stevenage in June 2022, helping the club achieve promotion to EFL League One during the 2022–23 season. After three seasons at Stevenage, he signed for Barnet on a free transfer in July 2025.

== Early life ==
Born in Luton, England, Smith attended Stopsley High School. He is a lifelong supporter of Everton.

== Club career ==
=== Early career ===
Smith began his career in the youth academy at Luton Town. During his time in the club's development squad, Smith was named as first reserve to represent England Schoolboys in 2014. Luton opted against offering Smith his first professional contract, and he subsequently joined Biggleswade Town.

=== Hitchin Town ===
Smith signed for Southern League Premier Division club Hitchin Town in December 2014. He made his debut as a 76th-minute substitute in a 6–2 away defeat to St Neots Town on 21 February 2015. Smith made 11 appearances for the club during the remainder of the 2014–15 season. He scored his first goal in senior football in Hitchin's 3–1 victory against Slough Town on 22 August 2015. Smith trialled with Premier League club Crystal Palace in December 2015, playing in two matches for the club's under-21 team, although no transfer ultimately materialised. He also spent time at Ipswich Town in February 2016. Smith made 59 appearances in all competitions during the 2015–16 season, scoring seven goals, as Hitchin won the Herts Senior Cup in May 2016.

Ahead of the 2016–17 season, Smith played in two pre-season friendlies for Shrewsbury Town and spent time on trial with Coventry City. Having missed Hitchin's opening four matches of the new season due to the trials, Smith returned to the first team on 20 August 2016 against Stratford Town. He was initially deployed in midfield for the first time in his career, before reverting to right-back for the remainder of the season. Smith played 53 times during the season, as Hitchin missed out on promotion to the National League South after losing in the Southern League play-off final to Leamington in May 2017.

=== Boreham Wood ===
Smith joined National League club Boreham Wood on 5 July 2017, signing a two-year contract. He made his debut for Boreham Wood in the club's first match of the 2017–18 season, scoring in a 2–2 draw away to AFC Fylde on 5 August 2017. Smith suffered a knee injury in Boreham Wood's play-off match against AFC Fylde, which resulted in his substitution at half-time. He made 53 appearances during his first season with the club, scoring four goals, as Boreham Wood missed out on promotion to the Football League after losing 2–1 to Tranmere Rovers in the 2018 National League play-off final at Wembley Stadium. The knee injury sustained at the end of the season limited Smith to three appearances during the 2018–19 season.

Ahead of the 2019–20 season, Smith signed a two-year contract extension with Boreham Wood, which included the option of a further year. Boreham Wood reached the National League play-off semi-finals that season, with Smith making 36 appearances in all competitions on his return from injury. He scored six goals in 48 appearances during the 2020–21 season. The following season, Smith played in all six of Boreham Wood's FA Cup matches as they reached the fifth round of the competition for the first time in their history. Boreham Wood were eventually defeated by Premier League club Everton 2–0 at Goodison Park, with Smith playing the first 74 minutes. He made 41 appearances in all competitions that season. In June 2022, Boreham Wood announced his departure, with manager Luke Garrard praising Smith's role in the club's success and his resilience in overcoming injuries.

=== Stevenage ===
Smith signed for League Two club Stevenage on 23 June 2022, officially joining on 1 July 2022. He made his debut as an 82nd-minute substitute in a 2–1 victory against Stockport County on 6 August 2022, and scored his only goal for the club in a 2–1 win over Carlisle United two weeks later. Smith made 30 appearances during the 2022–23 season as Stevenage achieved promotion to League One with a second-place finish. He signed a new contract with the club in August 2023. He played a peripheral role during the 2023–24 season due to injury and the performances of first-choice right-back Luther James-Wildin, although he returned to the first team towards the end of the season and was voted the club's Player of the Month for April 2024. He was released by Stevenage at the end of the 2024–25 season.

=== Barnet ===
Smith signed for newly promoted League Two club Barnet on a free transfer on 15 July 2025.

== International career ==
Smith received a call-up to play for the England C team, who represent England at non-League level, for a match against Republic of Ireland amateurs in May 2018.

== Style of play ==
Deployed predominantly at right-back throughout his career, Smith has also been utilised as a right-sided midfielder. His preferred position is right-back. He has been described as "providing an attacking outlet" from defence, with previous managers highlighting his forward runs from full-back as a strength.

== Personal life ==
Smith is married.

== Career statistics ==
As of match played 21 November 2026

Appearances and goals by club, season and competition
Club	Season	League			FA Cup		EFL Cup		Other		Total	
Club	Season	Division	Apps	Goals	Apps	Goals	Apps	Goals	Apps	Goals	Apps	Goals
Hitchin Town	2014–15	SFL Premier Division	11	0	0	0	—		0	0	11	0
Hitchin Town	2015–16	SFL Premier Division	40	4	5	2	—		14 (Note: Four appearances and one goal in FA Trophy; one appearance in Herts Charity Cup; four appearances in Herts Senior Cup; four appearances in Southern Football League Cup; one appearance in 2016 Southern Football League play-offs)	1	59	7
Hitchin Town	2016–17	SFL Premier Division	39	3	3	0	—		11 (Note: Five appearances in FA Trophy; two appearances in the Herts Charity Cup; three appearances and one goal in Herts Senior Cup; one appearance in Southern Football League Cup)	1	53	4
Hitchin Town	Total		90	7	8	2	0	0	25	2	123	11
Boreham Wood	2017–18	National League	43	3	3	0	—		7 (Note: Four appearances and one goal in FA Trophy; two appearances in Herts Senior Cup; one appearance in 2018 National League play-offs)	1	53	4
Boreham Wood	2018–19	National League	3	0	0	0	—		0	0	3	0
Boreham Wood	2019–20	National League	32	3	1	0	—		3 (Note: One appearance in FA Trophy; two appearances and one goal in 2020 National League play-offs)	1	36	4
Boreham Wood	2020–21	National League	43	5	4	1	—		1 (Note: Appearance(s) in FA Trophy)	0	48	6
Boreham Wood	2021–22	National League	32	4	6	0	—		3	0	41	4
Boreham Wood	Total		153	15	14	1	0	0	14	2	181	18
Stevenage	2022–23	League Two	22	1	2	0	1	0	5 (Note: Appearance(s) in EFL Trophy)	0	30	1
Stevenage	2023–24	League One	11	0	1	0	1	0	2	0	15	0
Stevenage	2024–25	League One	14	0	2	0	1	0	5	0	22	0
Stevenage	Total		47	1	5	0	3	0	12	0	67	1
Barnet	2025–26	League Two	29	0	1	0	1	0	2	0	33	0
Barnet	2026–27	League Two	3	0	1	1	1	0	1	1	6	2
Barnet	Total		32	0	2	1	2	0	3	1	39	2
Career total			322	23	29	4	5	0	54	5	410	32

== Honours ==
Stevenage

- EFL League Two runner-up: 2022–23
