= Dylan Switters =

English association football player

Personal information
- Full name: Dylan James Joseph Switters
- Date of birth: 14 February 2001 (age 25)
- Place of birth: Stevenage, England
- Position: Central midfielder

Team information
- Current team: Glossop North End

Youth career
- 2016–2017: Norwich City
- 2017–2018: Stevenage

Senior career*
Years	Team	Apps	(Gls)
2018–2019	Stevenage	2	(0)
2018–2019	→ Great Yarmouth Town (loan)	5	(3)
2019	→ Kings Langley (loan)	7	(1)
2019–2020	Hayes & Yeading United	10	(1)
2020	Götene IF	1	(0)
2020–2022	Leiston	23	(2)
2022	→ St Neots Town (loan)	3	(0)
2022	Baldock Town	10	(3)
2023	Avro	4	(0)
2023–2024	Northwich Victoria	38	(4)
2024	Wythenshawe Town	1	(0)
2025–	Glossop North End	23	(6)
- * Club domestic league appearances and goals as of 23:29, 26 August 2026 (UTC)

Dylan James Joseph Switters (born 14 February 2001) is an English footballer who plays as a central midfielder for North West Counties Premier Division club Glossop North End.

A graduate of the Norwich City and Stevenage academies, Switters made his first-team debut for Stevenage in April 2018, making two senior appearances and spending time on loan with Great Yarmouth Town and Kings Langley. He joined Hayes & Yeading United in August 2019, remaining for four months before a brief spell with Swedish club Götene IF. Switters subsequently returned to England, playing non-League football with Leiston, Baldock Town, Avro, Northwich Victoria, Wythenshawe Town, before joining Glossop North End in September 2025.

== Early life ==
Born in Stevenage, Hertfordshire, Switters changed his surname by deed poll in July 2018. He was previously known as Dylan O'Donnell.

== Career ==
=== Stevenage ===
Switters began his career with Norwich City, where he was a regular for the club's under-18 team. In December 2017, he signed a one-and-a-half year academy scholarship with Stevenage, featuring in the under-18 team's run to the fourth round of the FA Youth Cup that season. He made his professional debut for Stevenage in a 3–1 League Two victory over Exeter City on 28 April 2018, appearing as a 90th-minute substitute.

Having not featured for the first team during the first half of the 2018–19 season, Switters joined Eastern Counties League Premier Division club Great Yarmouth Town on a one-month work-experience loan in December 2018. He scored three goals in five appearances, including one in a 2–0 home victory against local rivals Gorleston on 26 December 2018, for which he was named Man of the Match. In January 2019, he moved to Southern League Premier Division South club Kings Langley, making seven appearances and scoring once in a 3–0 victory over Beaconsfield Town.

=== Hayes & Yeading United ===
Switters spent the early part of pre-season ahead of the 2019–20 season on trial with Wealdstone of the National League South, featuring in a friendly against Hayes & Yeading United. He subsequently joined Hayes & Yeading on trial before signing for the club permanently ahead of the Southern League season. Switters made his debut in a 2–2 draw away at Tiverton Town on 10 August 2019 and went on to play 16 times for the club in all competitions, scoring twice, before leaving the club in December 2019.

=== Leiston and Baldock Town ===
Without a club, Switters enrolled in a player placement programme set up by the League Football Education, a three-month initiative offering former apprentices experience with European clubs. He joined Götene IF of the Swedish Västergötland Norra, though the placement was curtailed in March 2020 due to the COVID-19 pandemic. Ahead of the 2020–21 season, he trialled with Hendon before signing for Leiston of the Southern League Premier Division Central on 10 September 2020. Switters debuted two days later in a 5–0 FA Cup victory over Halstead Town and scored his first goal in a 2–2 draw with AFC Rushden & Diamonds on 6 October 2020. He made 14 appearances, scoring once, before the season was curtailed due to restrictions associated with the COVID-19 pandemic.

Switters remained with Leiston for the start of the 2021–22 season, making 20 appearances before joining Southern League Central club St Neots Town on loan in January 2022. He featured three times before a recurring foot injury ended his season, later undergoing surgery in April 2022. Switters left Leiston at the end of the campaign and trialled with FC United of Manchester in July 2022, although no transfer materialised.

=== Further spells in non-League ===
Switters spent the first half of the 2022–23 season at Baldock Town, scoring four goals in 15 appearances. He subsequently relocated to the north of England, joining North West Counties Football League Premier Division club Avro on 7 January 2023. He made his debut as a second-half substitute in a 2–2 draw with Bury A.F.C. on 11 January 2023 and made five appearances in all competitions as Avro earned promotion to the Northern Premier League.

At the start of the 2023–24 season, Switters signed for Midland League Premier Division club Northwich Victoria, where he scored four goals in 31 appearances. He extended his contract for a further year in July 2024, with manager Matt Barnes describing him as "the most naturally gifted footballer I've had the pleasure of managing". Switters left the club on 28 November 2024, later making one appearance for Wythenshawe Town the following month. He joined Glossop North End of the North West Counties Premier Division early in the 2025–26 season.

== Style of play ==
Described as a creative, dynamic central midfielder, Switters has also been utilised in defensive midfield.

== Career statistics ==
As of match played 22 August 2026

Appearances and goals by club, season and competition
Club	Season	League			FA Cup		League Cup		Other		Total	
Club	Season	Division	Apps	Goals	Apps	Goals	Apps	Goals	Apps	Goals	Apps	Goals
Stevenage	2017–18	League Two	2	0	0	0	0	0	0	0	2	0
Stevenage	2018–19	League Two	0	0	0	0	0	0	0	0	0	0
Stevenage	Total		2	0	0	0	0	0	0	0	2	0
Great Yarmouth Town (loan)	2018–19	Eastern Counties Premier Division	5	3	—		—		0	0	5	3
Kings Langley (loan)	2018–19	Southern Premier Division South	7	1	—		—		0	0	7	1
Hayes & Yeading United	2019–20	Southern Premier Division South	10	1	3	1	0	0	3 (Note: Two appearances in FA Trophy; one appearance in Southern League Cup)	0	16	2
Leiston	2020–21	Southern Premier Division Central	8	1	5	0	—		1 (Note: Appearance in FA Trophy)	0	14	1
Leiston	2021–22	Southern Premier Division Central	15	1	1	0	—		4 (Note: Three appearances in FA Trophy; one appearance in Southern League Cup)	0	20	1
Leiston	Total		23	2	6	0	0	0	5	0	34	2
St Neots Town (loan)	2021–22	Southern Premier Division Central	3	0	—		—		0	0	3	0
Baldock Town	2022–23	Spartan South Midland Premier Division	10	3	—		—		5 (Note: Three appearances and one goal in FA Vase; one appearance in Challenge Trophy; one appearance in Premier Division Cup)	1	15	4
Avro	2022–23	North West Counties Premier Division	4	0	—		—		1 (Note: Appearance in North West Counties Challenge Cup)	0	5	0
Northwich Victoria	2023–24	Midland League Premier Division	25	4	—		—		6 (Note: Three appearances in FA Vase; one appearance in Midland League Cup; one appearance in Cheshire Senior Cup; one appearance in Mid Cheshire Cup)	0	31	4
Northwich Victoria	2024–25	Midland League Premier Division	13	0	3	1	—		2 (Note: One appearance and one goal in FA Vase; one appearance in Cheshire Senior Cup)	1	18	2
Northwich Victoria	Total		38	4	3	1	0	0	8	1	49	6
Wythenshawe Town	2024–25	North West Counties Premier Division	1	0	—		—		0	0	1	0
Glossop North End	2025–26	North West Counties Premier Division	19	6	—		—		2 (Note: One appearance in North West Counties Challenge Cup; one appearance in Derbyshire Senior Cup)	0	21	6
Glossop North End	2026–27	North West Counties Premier Division	4	0	1	0	—		2 (Note: Appearances in FA Vase)	0	7	0
Glossop North End	Total		23	6	1	0	0	0	4	0	28	6
Career total			126	20	13	2	0	0	26	2	165	24
