= Dan Sweeney (footballer) =

English footballer (born 1994)

- Sweeney playing for AFC Wimbledon in 2026

Personal information
- Full name: Daniel Liam Sweeney
- Date of birth: 25 April 1994 (age 32)
- Place of birth: Kingston upon Thames, England
- Height: 1.91 m (6 ft 3 in)
- Position: Centre-back

Team information
- Current team: AFC Wimbledon
- Number: 26

Youth career
- –2012: AFC Wimbledon

Senior career*
Years	Team	Apps	(Gls)
2012–2013	AFC Wimbledon	0	(0)
2013–2015	Kingstonian	102	(10)
2015	Dulwich Hamlet	10	(6)
2015–2016	Maidstone United	44	(3)
2017–2020	Barnet	83	(1)
2017	→ Hampton & Richmond Borough (loan)	4	(0)
2020–2022	Forest Green Rovers	57	(1)
2022–2026	Stevenage	99	(6)
2026–	AFC Wimbledon	0	(0)

International career^{‡}
2016	England C	1	(0)
- * Club domestic league appearances and goals as of 29 December 2025 (UTC) ‡ National team caps and goals as of 25 December 2016

Daniel Liam Sweeney (born 25 April 1994) is an English professional footballer who plays as a centre-back for EFL League One club AFC Wimbledon.

== Club career ==
=== AFC Wimbledon ===
In July 2012, Sweeney was one of five academy prospects to be invited to train with the AFC Wimbledon first team and play for the development squad after the club pulled out of the Suburban League.

It is often claimed that Sweeney made a single appearance for the first team in February 2013, although this has proved untrue with Peter Sweeney instead featuring against Wycombe Wanderers.

=== Kingstonian ===
In March 2013, Sweeney joined tenants Kingstonian following his release from AFC Wimbledon. On 4 March, he made his debut in a 2–1 London Senior Cup victory over Hanwell Town. On 6 April, he scored his first goal for the club in a 3–2 Isthmian Premier Division defeat to Whitehawk.

In October 2013, Sweeney was offered a trial with the Championship side Ipswich Town and spent a week training with the club. He made a single appearance for the Reserve team.

On 15 June 2014, Sweeney signed a one-year contract to remain at Kingsmeadow. Despite being offered a contract ahead of the 2015–16 season, Sweeney rejected the offer and played for the K's on non-contract terms.

On 6 October 2015, he made his final appearance from the bench in the Alan Turvey Trophy in a 2–2 draw with Hendon. Taking the K's second penalty, Sweeney hit the crossbar but saw his side win 3–1 on penalties.

=== Dulwich Hamlet ===
On 9 October 2015, Sweeney joined Isthmian Premier Division side Dulwich Hamlet following a seven-day approach. On 10 October, he assisted and scored on his debut in a 4–1 victory at Farnborough. He also scored in the subsequent five fixtures, claiming the Man of the Match award on two occasions.

On 21 November, Sweeney recorded his second assist for the club in a 3–2 win at Bognor Regis Town. After his early goalscoring form, Sweeney attracted the attention of a number of Football League clubs. His final appearance came in a 1–0 defeat to Needham Market on 5 December.

=== Maidstone United ===
On 12 December 2015, Sweeney completed a move to National League South side Maidstone United. On 19 December, he made his debut in a 1–0 defeat at Hayes & Yeading United. He scored his first goal for the club four games later, opening the scoring inside three minutes in a 2–0 win against Bath City.

On 27 February 2016, he received the first dismissal of his career with a second yellow card during a 2–1 defeat at Havant & Waterlooville.

After finishing third in the league with 77 points, Maidstone earned a place in the play-offs. Sweeney featured in both legs of the semifinal 3–0 aggregate victory over Truro City, and came off the bench in the 87th minute of the play-off final at Ebbsfleet United. With the game tied at 2–2 after 120 minutes, Sweeney converted his team's fifth and final penalty to seal promotion to the National League.

On 8 April, the club announced Sweeney had agreed to sign a new deal ahead of the 2016–17 season.

Making 15 consecutive league appearances at the start of the season, Sweeney scored his first National League goal in a 4–2 victory over Solihull Moors on 1 October. On 17 December, he made his final appearance for the club in a 2–1 defeat to North Ferriby United.

=== Barnet ===
On 22 December 2016, it was announced Sweeney would join League Two club Barnet for an undisclosed fee. Joining up with the squad for training immediately, he officially joined on 1 January. He made his English Football League debut the following day as a substitute against Plymouth Argyle. Sweeney played only four times for the Bees between January and October and was loaned out to Hampton & Richmond Borough on 13 October 2017. Following his return from loan, Sweeney worked his way back into the team, and began playing in a centre-back role following the appointment of Graham Westley in January 2018. After Martin Allen took over two months later, Sweeney was made captain. He won the player of the season award for 2017–18, a feat he repeated the following season. Sweeney left Barnet following the expiration of his contract in June 2020.

=== Forest Green Rovers ===
Sweeney signed for League Two club Forest Green Rovers on 1 July 2020 on a two-year deal.

=== Stevenage ===
On 18 June 2022, Sweeney agreed to join Stevenage on a free transfer following a title-winning campaign with Forest Green Rovers. In the 2022–23 season, Sweeney made 55 appearances and scored 5 goals in all competitions, as the club won promotion from League Two. On 7 March 2024, Sweeney extended his contract with Stevenage. On 3 May, 2026, Sweeney scored a controversial 92nd minute winner for Stevenage to send them into the playoffs, they would end up losing the semi final 3-0 on aggregate to Stockport County. On 18 May 2026 Stevenage announced it would be releasing him.

=== AFC Wimbledon ===
On 23 June 2026 Sweeney signed for League One club AFC Wimbledon on a two year deal.

== International career ==
In June 2016, Sweeney was called up to the England C squad after initially being placed on a contingency list. On 5 June, he made his only appearance for the national team in a 4–3 International Challenge Trophy defeat to Slovakia U21s. Sweeney came off the bench in the 70th minute to replace Elliott Whitehouse.

== Personal life ==
Sweeney's brother Ryan (born 1997) was also in the academy at AFC Wimbledon.

== Career statistics ==
As of match played 11 February 2023

Appearances and goals by club, season and competition
Club	Season	League			FA Cup		League Cup		Other		Total	
Club	Season	Division	Apps	Goals	Apps	Goals	Apps	Goals	Apps	Goals	Apps	Goals
AFC Wimbledon	2012–13	League Two	0	0	0	0	0	0	0	0	0	0
Kingstonian	2012–13	Isthmian Premier Division	6	2	0	0	0	0	4 (Note: Four appearances in the London Senior Cup)	0	10	2
Kingstonian	2013–14	Isthmian Premier Division	42	5	1	0	3	0	4 (Note: One appearance in the FA Trophy, one appearance in the London Senior Cup and two appearances and one goal in the Surrey Senior Cup)	1	50	6
Kingstonian	2014–15	Isthmian Premier Division	42	2	1	0	4	0	1 (Note: One appearance in the FA Trophy)	0	48	2
Kingstonian	2015–16	Isthmian Premier Division	12	1	2	0	2	1	0	0	16	2
Kingstonian	Total		102	10	4	0	9	1	9	1	124	12
Dulwich Hamlet	2015–16	Isthmian Premier Division	10	6	0	0	0	0	2 (Note: Two appearances in the FA Trophy)	0	12	6
Maidstone United	2015–16	National League South	21	1	0	0	0	0	0	0	21	1
Maidstone United	2016–17	National League	23	2	2	0	0	0	2 (Note: Two appearances in the FA Trophy)	0	27	2
Maidstone United	Total		44	3	2	0	0	0	2	0	48	3
Barnet	2016–17	League Two	4	0	0	0	0	0	0	0	4	0
Barnet	2017–18	League Two	21	0	0	0	0	0	0	0	21	0
Barnet	2018–19	National League	41	1	7	0	0	0	5 (Note: Five appearances in the FA Trophy)	0	53	1
Barnet	2019–20	National League	17	0	2	0	0	0	3 (Note: Three appearances in the FA Trophy)	0	22	0
Barnet	Total		83	1	9	0	0	0	8	0	100	1
Hampton & Richmond Borough (loan)	2017–18	National League South	4	0	1	0	0	0	0	0	5	0
Forest Green Rovers	2020–21	League Two	21	0	1	0	1	0	5 (Note: Three appearances in EFL Trophy and two in EFL League Two play-offs)	0	28	0
Forest Green Rovers	2021–22	League Two	36	1	0	0	1	0	2 (Note: Appearance(s) in EFL Trophy)	0	39	1
Forest Green Rovers	Total		57	1	1	0	2	0	7	0	67	1
Stevenage	2022–23	League Two	27	4	4	0	3	0	4	1	38	5
Career total			323	25	20	0	14	1	32	2	390	28

== Honours ==
Forest Green Rovers

- EFL League Two: 2021–22

Stevenage

- EFL League Two runner-up: 2022–23
