= 2022–23 Stevenage F.C. season =

Stevenage
2022–23 season
- Chairman: Phil Wallace
- Manager: Steve Evans
- Stadium: Broadhall Way
- League Two: 2nd (promoted)
- FA Cup: Fourth round
- EFL Cup: Third round
- EFL Trophy: Round of 16
- Top goalscorer: League: Luke Norris; Jamie Reid; Jordan Roberts (10 each); All: Luke Norris; Jamie Reid (14 each)
Home colours

The 2022–23 season was Stevenage's ninth consecutive season in League Two and their 47th year in existence. In addition to the league, they also competed in the 2022–23 FA Cup, the 2022–23 EFL Cup and the 2022–23 EFL Trophy.

== Transfers ==
=== In ===
Date	Pos	Player	Transferred from	Fee	Ref
1 July 2022 (Note: The transfer was announced on 23 May, and would become official on July 1, once his Burton Albion contract expired)	CB	(England) Michael Bostwick	(England) Burton Albion	Free transfer	
1 July 2022 (Note: The transfer was announced on 23 May, and would become official on July 1, once his Gillingham contract expired)	GK	(England) Aaron Chapman	(England) Gillingham	Free transfer	
1 July 2022 (Note: The transfer was announced on 16 June, and would become official on July 1 once his Rochdale contract expired)	LB	(England) Max Clark	(England) Rochdale	Free transfer	
1 July 2022 (Note: The transfer was announced on 23 May, and would become official on July 1, once his Oldham Athletic contract expired)	CB	(England) Carl Piergianni	(England) Oldham Athletic	Free transfer	
1 July 2022 (Note: The transfer was announced on 17 May, and would become official on July 1, once his Motherwell contract expired)	LM	(England) Jordan Roberts	(Scotland) Motherwell	Free transfer	
1 July 2022 (Note: The transfer was announced on 25 May, and would become official on July 1, once his Northampton Town contract expired)	CF	(England) Danny Rose	(England) Northampton Town	Free transfer	
1 July 2022 (Note: The transfer was announced on 23 June, and would become official on July 1, once his Boreham Wood contract expired)	RB	(England) Kane Smith	(England) Boreham Wood	Free transfer	
1 July 2022 (Note: The transfer was announced on 18 June, and would become official on July 1, once his Forest Green Rovers contract expired)	CB	(England) Dan Sweeney	(England) Forest Green Rovers	Free transfer	
22 August 2022	RW	(England) David Amoo	(England) Port Vale	Free Transfer	
3 January 2023	CM	(England) Jake Forster-Caskey	(England) Charlton Athletic	Undisclosed	
30 January 2023	CF	(England) Josh March	(England) Forest Green Rovers	Undisclosed	
6 February 2023	GK	(Wales) Adam Przybek	(England) Walsall	Free Transfer	

=== Out ===
Date	Pos	Player	Transferred to	Fee	Ref
27 June 2022	GK	(England) Elyh Harrison	(England) Manchester United	Undisclosed	
30 June 2022	LW	(Portugal) Bruno Andrade	(England) Boreham Wood	Released	
30 June 2022	RB	(England) Bradley Barry	(England) Eastbourne Borough	Released	
30 June 2022	GK	(France) Sacha Bastien	Unattached	Released	
30 June 2022	AM	(England) Charlie Carter	(England) Eastleigh	Released	
30 June 2022	LB	(England) Ben Coker	(England) Solihull Moors	Released	
30 June 2022	CB	(Scotland) Scott Cuthbert	(England) Woking	Released	
30 June 2022	CF	(England) James Daly	(England) Woking	Released	
30 June 2022	CF	(England) Harry Draper	(England) Biggleswade Town	Released	
30 June 2022	CB	(England) Sam Dreyer	(England) Bedford Town	Released	
30 June 2022	CB	(England) Luis Fernandez	(England) Hampton & Richmond Borough	Released	
30 June 2022	CM	(England) Chris Lines	(England) Bath City	Released	
30 June 2022	RB	(England) Luke O'Neill	(England) Ebbsfleet United	Released	
30 June 2022	CB	(England) Luke Prosser	Unattached	Released	
30 June 2022	GK	(England) Timmy Smith	(England) Biggleswade Town	Released	
30 June 2022	CM	(England) Ed Upson	(England) Stowmarket Town	Released	
30 June 2022 (Note: The transfer was announced on 20 June, and would become official once his contract at the club expired)	GK	(England) Laurie Walker	(England) Barnet	Free transfer	
5 July 2022	CB	(England) Ross Marshall	(England) Torquay United	Undisclosed	
23 July 2022	CM	(England) Max Granville	(England) Biggleswade Town	Free Transfer	
3 January 2023	CM	(England) Arthur Read	(England) Colchester United	Undisclosed	
19 January 2023	RW	(England) David Amoo	(England) Crewe Alexandra	Undisclosed	
6 February 2023	GK	(England) Aaron Chapman	(England) Scunthorpe United	Undisclosed	

=== Loans in ===
Date	Pos	Player	Loaned from	On loan until	Ref
15 June 2022	DM	(Scotland) Dean Campbell	(Scotland) Aberdeen	End of Season	
23 June 2022	GK	(England) Taye Ashby-Hammond	(England) Fulham	End of Season	
11 July 2022	DM	(England) Saxon Earley	(England) Norwich City	2 January 2023 (Note: On 2 January, Earley returned to Norwich early, allowing him to move to Plymouth)	
1 September 2022	CM	(England) Alex Gilbey	(England) Charlton Athletic	End of Season	
5 January 2023	LM	(Republic of Ireland) Daryl Horgan	(England) Wycombe Wanderers	End of Season	
13 January 2023	CB	(United States) Jonathan Tomkinson	(England) Norwich City	End of Season	
31 January 2023	GK	(Iceland) Jökull Andrésson	(England) Reading	End of Season	
31 January 2023	LB	(Scotland) Josh Reid	(England) Coventry City	End of Season	
16 February 2023	GK	(England) Toby Savin	(England) Accrington Stanley	10 March 2023 (Note: On 24 February, Savin's emergency loan from Accrington was extended by another seven days. On 3 March another seven-days was added on to the loan deal)	
10 March 2023	GK	(Scotland) Jon McCracken	(England) Norwich City	17 March 2023	
6 April 2023	GK	(France) Thimothée Lo-Tutala	(England) Hull City	13 April 2023	

=== Loans out ===
Date	Pos	Player	Loaned to	On loan until	Ref
29 July 2022	MF	(England) Alfie Williams	(England) Hemel Hempstead Town	17 September 2022	(Note: On 17 September, Williams' loan at Hemel was cut short, allowing him to join Hayes & Yeading in a similar loan move.)
5 August 2022	CB	(England) Mackye Townsend-West	(England) St Albans City	9 December 2022 (Note: On 9 December, Townsend-West was recalled to join Royston Town on loan.)	
17 September 2022	MF	(England) Alfie Williams	(England) Hayes & Yeading United	1 January 2023	
23 September 2022	DM	(England) Jack Smith	(England) Dartford	22 October 2022	
9 December 2022	RB	(England) Owen Cochrane	(England) Potters Bar Town	9 January 2023	
9 December 2022	CB	(England) Mackye Townsend-West	(England) Royston Town	9 January 2023	

== Pre-season and friendlies ==
It was announced on 16 May 2022 that the club would travel to Jersey for a training camp and have a subsequent friendly on 2 July against Combined Counties League club Jersey Bulls. Then on 10 June, Stevenage confirmed a home pre-season friendly with Peterborough United along with three further away fixtures. A further home pre-season match was confirmed, against West Bromwich Albion. The seventh and final friendly to be announced was against Derby County.

Win Draw Loss Fixtures

2 July 2022 Friendly	Jersey Bulls	0–4	Stevenage	St Helier, Jersey
15:00		Report	List (?); Rose (?); Roberts (?); Sweeney (?)	Stadium: Springfield Stadium

5 July 2022 Friendly	Hitchin Town	0–3	Stevenage	Hitchin
19:00 BST		Report	Roberts 20'; Smith 38'; Sweeney 90'	Stadium: Top Field; Attendance: 680

9 July 2022 Friendly	Stevenage	2–0	West Bromwich Albion	Stevenage
15:00 BST	O'Shea 73' (o.g.); List 81'	Report		Stadium: The Lamex Stadium

13 July 2022 Friendly	Stevenage	1–1	Peterborough United	Stevenage
19:30 BST	Norris 18' (pen.)	Report	Clarke-Harris 49'	Stadium: The Lamex Stadium; Attendance: 830

16 July 2022 Friendly	St Albans City	0–2	Stevenage	St Albans
13:00 BST		Report	Taylor 36'; Sweeney 90+1'	Stadium: Clarence Park

19 July 2022 Friendly	Stevenage	1–0	Derby County	Stevenage
19:30 BST	List 30'	Report		Stadium: Lamex Stadium

23 July 2022 Friendly	Peterborough Sports	0–0	Stevenage	Peterborough
15:00 BST		Report		Stadium: Lincoln Road

26 July 2022 Friendly	Stamford	5–0	Stevenage	Stamford
19:30 BST		Report		Stadium: Zeeco Stadium

== Competitions ==
=== Overall record ===
Competition	First match	Last match	Starting round	Record							
Competition	First match	Last match	Starting round	Pld	W	D	L	GF	GA	GD	Win %
League Two	July 2022	May 2023	Matchday 1	0	0	0	0	0	0	+0	—
FA Cup	TBC	TBC	First round	0	0	0	0	0	0	+0	—
EFL Cup	TBC	TBC	First round	0	0	0	0	0	0	+0	—
EFL Trophy	TBC	TBC	Group stage	0	0	0	0	0	0	+0	—
Total				0	0	0	0	0	0	+0	—

Last updated: pre-season
Source: [ Soccerway]

=== League Two ===
==== League table ====
Pos	Team	Pld	W	D	L	GF	GA	GD	Pts	Promotion, qualification or relegation
1	Leyton Orient (C, P)	46	26	13	7	61	34	+27	91	Promotion to EFL League One
2	Stevenage (P)	46	24	13	9	61	39	+22	85	Promotion to EFL League One
3	Northampton Town (P)	46	23	14	9	62	42	+20	83	Promotion to EFL League One
4	Stockport County	46	22	13	11	65	37	+28	79	Qualification for League Two play-offs
5	Carlisle United (O, P)	46	20	16	10	66	43	+23	76	Qualification for League Two play-offs
6	Bradford City	46	20	16	10	61	43	+18	76	Qualification for League Two play-offs

Source: EFL Official Website
Rules for classification: 1) Points; 2) Goal difference; 3) Number of goals scored; 4) Head-to-head results; 5) Wins; 6) Away goals; 7) Penalty points (sec 9.5); 8) 12-point sending off offences
(C) Champions; (O) Play-off winners; (P) Promoted

==== Results summary ====
Overall								Home						Away					
Pld	W	D	L	GF	GA	GD	Pts	W	D	L	GF	GA	GD	W	D	L	GF	GA	GD
45	23	13	9	60	39	+21	82	17	2	4	40	16	+24	6	11	5	20	23	−3

Last updated: 29 April 2023.
Source: [ Soccerway]

==== Results by round ====
Round	1	2	3	4	5	6	7	8	9	10	11	12	13	14	15	16	17	18	19	20	21	22	23	24	25	26	27	28	29	30	31	32	33	34	35	36	37	38	39	40	41	42	43	44	45	46
Ground	A	H	A	H	H	A	A	H	A	H	A	H	H	A	H	A	A	H	A	H	H	A	H	H	A	H	A	H	A	A	H	A	A	H	H	A	H	A	H	A	H	H	A	A	H	A
Result	W	W	D	W	W	L	W	W	L	W	W	W	W	D	L	W	D	W	D	W	D	D	W	W	D	W	D	L	D	L	L	W	L	W	W	D	L	D	D	D	W	W	L	W	W	W
Position	9	5	5	4	2	5	2	2	4	3	3	2	1	1	2	2	2	2	2	2	2	2	2	2	2	2	2	2	2	2	3	2	3	3	2	2	3	3	4	5	3	3	3	3	2	2

Updated to match(es) played on 8 May 2023. Source: [ Soccerway]
A = Away; H = Home; W = Win; D = Draw; L = Loss; P = Postponed

==== Matches ====
Win Draw Loss Fixtures

On 23 June, the league fixtures were announced.

30 July 2022 1	Tranmere Rovers	1–2	Stevenage	Birkenhead
15:00 BST	Hemmings 51'; McAlear (yellow card) 90+5'	Report	List (yellow card) 28'; Reeves 40', (yellow card) 79'; Vancooten (yellow card) 57'; Roberts 84'	Stadium: Prenton Park; Attendance: 6,111; Referee: Jeremy Simpson

6 August 2022 2	Stevenage	2–1	Stockport County	Stevenage
15:00 BST	Rose (yellow card) 85'; Norris 88' (pen.); Reid 90+5'	Report	Palmer (yellow card) 10' (yellow-red card) 87'; Camps 58'; Horsfall (yellow card) 66'; Sarcevic (yellow card) 75'	Stadium: Lamex Stadium; Attendance: 2,973; Referee: Adam Herczeg

13 August 2022 3	Walsall	1–1	Stevenage	Bescot
15:00 BST	Johnson 13'; Knowles (yellow card) 70'; Evans (yellow card) 90+2'	Report	Roberts (yellow card) 90+5'; Rose 90+10', (yellow card) 90+1'	Stadium: Poundland Bescot Stadium; Attendance: 5,079; Referee: Charles Breakspear

16 August 2022 4	Stevenage	1–0	Rochdale	Stevenage
19:45 BST	Roberts (yellow card) 35'; Piergianni 41'	Report	Ball (yellow card) 66'; Seriki (yellow card) 81'	Stadium: Lamex Stadium; Attendance: 2,720; Referee: Tom Reeves

20 August 2022 5	Stevenage	2–1	Carlisle United	Stevenage
15:00 BST	Smith 16'; Clark 42'; Norris (yellow card) 89'; Ashby-Hammond (yellow card) 90+2'	Report	Dennis 45+2'; Harris (yellow card) 69'	Stadium: Lamex Stadium; Attendance: 2,514; Referee: Craig Hicks

27 August 2022 6	Salford City	1–0	Stevenage	Salford
15:00 BST	Watson 90'	Report	Piergianni (yellow card) 55'	Stadium: Moor Lane; Attendance: 2,023; Referee: Darren Drysdale

3 September 2022 7	Crewe Alexandra	1–2	Stevenage	Crewe
15:00 BST	Thomas (penalty missed) 19', (yellow card) 76'; McDonald 27'; King (yellow card) 41'; Baker-Richardson (yellow card) 82'	Report	Sweeney (yellow card) 37'; Reid 48', 67'; Reeves (yellow card) 85'	Stadium: Mornflake Stadium; Attendance: 3,669; Referee: Tom Nield

10 September 2022	Stevenage	Postponed	Sutton United	Stevenage
15:00 BST				Stadium: Lamex Stadium
Note: Fixture was postponed as a mark of respect following the passing of Queen Elizabeth II.

13 September 2022 8	Stevenage	1–0	Newport County	Stevenage
19:45 BST	Norris (yellow card) 6'; Roberts (yellow card) 39'; Gilbey 48'; Sweeney (yellow card) 56'	Report		Stadium: Lamex Stadium; Attendance: 2,109; Referee: Oliver Langford

17 September 2022 9	Bradford City	3–0	Stevenage	Bradford
15:00 BST	Cook 6', (yellow card) 51', (goal) 56'; Halliday (yellow card) 36' (yellow-red card) 89'; Wright 62'	Report	Roberts (yellow card) 81'	Stadium: University of Bradford Stadium; Attendance: 16,917; Referee: Lee Swabey

24 September 2022 10	Stevenage	1–0	Harrogate Town	Stevenage
15:00 BST	Vancooten (yellow card) 89'; Sweeney 90'	Report		Stadium: Lamex Stadium; Attendance: 2,547; Referee: Sam Allison

1 October 2022 11	Crawley Town	1–2	Stevenage	Crawley
15:00 BST	Craig (yellow card) 14'; Fellows (yellow card) 45+4'; Nadesan 47' (yellow card) 57'	Report	Roberts 23'; Norris 85' (pen.)	Stadium: Broadfield Stadium; Attendance: 2,732; Referee: Will Finnie

4 October 2022 12	Stevenage	3–0	Sutton United	Stevenage
19:45 BST	Sweeney 28' (yellow card) 64'; Norris 48' 70'; Gilbey (yellow card) 77'	Report	Eastmond (yellow card) 24'; Milson (yellow card) 52'; Barden (yellow card) 67'; John (yellow card) 74'; Thomas (yellow card) 90+5'	Stadium: Lamex Stadium; Attendance: 2,471; Referee: Ollie Yates

8 October 2022 13	Stevenage	2–0	Swindon Town	Stevenage
15:00 BST	Roberts 11' 60'; Piergianni (yellow card) 45+3'	Report	Baudry (yellow card) 59'; Clayton (yellow card) 88'	Stadium: Lamex Stadium; Attendance: 4,087; Referee: Scott Oldham

15 October 2022 14	Gillingham	1–1	Stevenage	Gillingham
15:00 BST	Baggott 40'; Adelakun (yellow card) 59'	Report	Rose 28' (yellow card) 39'; Roberts (yellow card) 55'; Earley (yellow card) 68'	Stadium: MEMS Priestfield Stadium; Attendance: 5,031; Referee: Ross Joyce

22 October 2022 15	Stevenage	2–3	Northampton Town	Stevenage
15:00 BST	Vancooten (yellow card) 1'; Rose 35'; Gilbey 85'	Report	Appéré 1' (pen.); Koiki (yellow card) 45+2'; Bowie (yellow card) 56' (goal) 82'; McWilliams 87'; Hylton (red card) 90+3'; Burge (yellow card) 90+5'	Stadium: Lamex Stadium; Attendance: 4,941; Referee: Geoff Eltringham

25 October 2022 16	Doncaster Rovers	0–1	Stevenage	Doncaster
19:45 BST	Anderson (yellow card) 76'; Clayton (yellow card) 90+4'	Report	Roberts 25'; James-Wildin (yellow card) 31'	Stadium: Eco-Power Stadium; Attendance: 5,690; Referee: Seb Stockbridge

29 October 2022 17	Colchester United	1–1	Stevenage	Colchester
15:00 BST	Marshall-Miranda 6' (yellow card) 72'	Report	Rose 17'; Piergianni (yellow card) 76'; James-Wildin (yellow card) 86'; Earley (yellow card) 90+2'	Stadium: JobServe Community Stadium; Attendance: 3,486; Referee: Ben Speedie

12 November 2022 18	Stevenage	1–0	Hartlepool United	Stevenage
15:00 GMT	Gilbey (yellow card) 42'; Rose 79'	Report	Umerah (yellow card) 27'; Hamilton (yellow card) 39'; Paterson (yellow card) 76'; Killip (yellow card) 78'	Stadium: Lamex Stadium; Attendance: 3,626; Referee: Carl Boyeson

19 November 2022 19	Grimsby Town	1–1	Stevenage	Cleethorpes
15:00 GMT	McAtee (penalty missed) 39'; Green (yellow card) 42'; Maher 90+1'	Report	Piergianni (yellow card) 49'; Reeves 79'; Earley (yellow card) 80'	Stadium: Blundell Park; Attendance: 6,022; Referee: Tom Reeves

2 December 2022 20	Stevenage	5–0	Barrow	Stevenage
19:45 GMT	Reeves 18'; Reid 50'; Gilbey (yellow card) 63'; James-Wildin (yellow card) 65'; Sweeney 75'; Norris 78' (pen.); Warren 86' (o.g.)	Report	Ray (yellow card) 40'	Stadium: Lamex Stadium; Attendance: 2,756; Referee: Matt Donohue

10 December 2022 21	Stevenage	0–0	Mansfield Town	Stevenage
15:00 GMT	Piergianni (yellow card) 29'	Report		Stadium: Lamex Stadium; Attendance: 3,301; Referee: Anthony Backhouse

17 December 2022	AFC Wimbledon	Postponed	Stevenage	Wimbledon
15:00 GMT				Stadium: The Cherry Red Records Stadium
Note: Fixture was postponed due to a frozen pitch.

27 December 2022 22	Leyton Orient	0–0	Stevenage	Leyton
12:00 GMT	El Mizouni (yellow card) 21'; Pratley (yellow card) 51'	Report	James-Wildin (yellow card) 45'; Rose (yellow card) 50'	Stadium: Brisbane Road; Attendance: 8,644; Referee: Charles Breakspear

30 December 2022 23	Stevenage	3–1	Crawley Town	Stevenage
19:45 GMT	Roberts 10'; Piergianni 40', 83'; Gilbey (yellow card) 85'	Report	Telford 89' (pen.)	Stadium: The Lamex Stadium; Attendance: 3,238; Referee: Robert Lewis

2 January 2023 24	Stevenage	1–0	Gillingham	Stevenage
15:00 GMT	Piergianni 23'; Sweeney (yellow card) 34'; Gilbey (yellow card) 64'; Rose (yellow card) 88'	Report	Wright (yellow card) 37'	Stadium: The Lamex Stadium; Attendance: 3,703; Referee: Sunny Gill

14 January 2023 25	Harrogate Town	1–1	Stevenage	Harrogate
15:00 GMT	Armstrong 77'	Report	Roberts (yellow card) 22'; Piergianni 60'	Stadium: The EnviroVent Stadium; Attendance: 2,314; Referee: Adam Herczeg

21 January 2023 26	Stevenage	3–0	Leyton Orient	Stevenage
15:00 GMT	Reid 6'; Roberts 11'; Vancooten (yellow card) 19'; Piergianni (yellow card) 70'; Norris 90+1'	Report	El Mizouni (yellow card) 36' (yellow-red card) 45'; Smith (yellow card) 48'	Stadium: The Lamex Stadium; Attendance: 6,989; Referee: Scott Oldham

24 January 2023	Swindon Town	Postponed	Stevenage	Swindon
19:45 GMT				Stadium: County Ground
Note: Fixture was postponed due to a frozen pitch.

4 February 2023 27	Sutton United	0–0	Stevenage	Sutton
15:00 GMT	Boldewijn (yellow card) 51'	Report	Roberts (yellow card) 1'; Forster-Caskey (yellow card) 90+1'	Stadium: VBS Community Stadium; Attendance: 3,167; Referee: Thomas Kirk

11 February 2023 28	Stevenage	2–3	Bradford City	Stevenage
15:00 GMT	Piergianni 26'; Reid (yellow card) 31'; Sweeney 73'	Report	Clayton (yellow card) 7'; Stubbs (yellow card) 34'; Derbyshire 49'; Cook 56' (pen.); Halliday (yellow card) 74'; Walker 86'; Kelly (yellow card) 90+4'; Nevers (yellow card) 90+8'	Stadium: The Lamex Stadium; Attendance: 5,037; Referee: Leigh Doughty

14 February 2023 29	Newport County	2–2	Stevenage	Newport
19:45 GMT	Bogle 43', 84' (pen.); Baker (yellow card) 86'	Report	Norris 3', (yellow card) 11'; Roberts 50'; Bostwick (yellow card) 83'; Reid (yellow card) 90'	Stadium: Rodney Parade; Attendance: 3,486; Referee: Ollie Yates

18 February 2023 30	Stockport County	2–0	Stevenage	Edgeley
15:00 GMT	Collar 34'; Rydel 90+5'	Report	Gilbey (yellow card) 57'; Sweeney (yellow card) 76'; Smith (yellow card) 78'	Stadium: Edgeley Park; Attendance: 9,412 (270 away); Referee: Bobby Madden

25 February 2023 31	Stevenage	0–1	Tranmere Rovers	Stevenage
15:00 GMT	Reid (yellow card) 77'; Reeves (yellow card) 78'	Report	Hendry (yellow card) 26'; Hawkes (yellow card) 58', (goal) 73' (pen.); Dacres-Cogley (yellow card) 77'; Davies (yellow card) 85'	Stadium: The Lamex Stadium; Attendance: 3,675; Referee: Martin Woods

28 February 2023 32	AFC Wimbledon	2–3	Stevenage	Wimbledon
19:45 GMT	Al-Hamadi 39', 74'; Marsh (yellow card) 53'; Kalambayi (yellow card) 60'	Report	Clark (yellow card) 43'; Piergianni 55'; Sweeney (yellow card) 60'; McAteer 61' (o.g.); Gilbey (yellow card) 70'; Roberts (yellow card) 80'; Norris 83'	Stadium: Cherry Red Records Stadium; Attendance: 6,936; Referee: Jeremy Simpson

5 March 2023 33	Rochdale	2–0	Stevenage	Rochdale
15:00 GMT	Rodney 7'; Lloyd 28'	Report	Clark (yellow card) 19'; Reeves (yellow card) 59'	Stadium: Crown Oil Arena; Attendance: 2,189; Referee: Seb Stockbridge

11 March 2023 34	Stevenage	3–1	Walsall	Stevenage
15:00 GMT	March 7', 36'; Norris 14'; Piergianni (yellow card) 62'; Reeves (yellow card) 66'; Gilbey (yellow card) 69'	Report	Monthé 29'; White (yellow card) 35'	Stadium: The Lamex Stadium; Attendance: 3,441 (including 364 away supporters); Referee: Carl Brook

14 March 2023 35	Stevenage	1–0	Crewe Alexandra	Stevenage
19:45 GMT	Reeves (yellow card) 52'; Reid 79'; Rose (yellow card) 85'	Report		Stadium: The Lamex Stadium; Attendance: 2,670; Referee: Alan Young

18 March 2023 36	Carlisle United	0–0	Stevenage	Carlisle
15:00 GMT	Feeney (yellow card) 43'; Mellish (yellow card) 53'	Report	Piergianni (yellow card) 43'; March (yellow card) 53'; Sweeney (yellow card) 70'	Stadium: Brunton Park; Attendance: 8,029; Referee: Tom Reeves

25 March 2023 37	Stevenage	1–3	Salford City	Stevenage
15:00 GMT	Norris (yellow card) 58', (goal) 90'; Roberts (yellow card) 82'	Report	Leak (yellow card) 42'; Mallan 65'; Cairns (yellow card) 80'; Hendry 80'; Smith 90+2'	Stadium: The Lamex Stadium; Attendance: 3,749 (120 away supporters); Referee: Darren Drysdale

1 April 2023 38	Northampton Town	1–1	Stevenage	Northampton
15:00 BST	Appéré 6'; Guthrie (yellow card) 60'; Pinnock (yellow card) 75'; Hondermarck (yellow card) 83'; Odimayo (yellow card) 90'; Yengi (yellow card) 90+3'	Report	McCracken (yellow card) 13'; Campbell (yellow card) 19'; Reid 72'; Rose (yellow card) 86'	Stadium: Sixfields Stadium; Attendance: 7,759 (956 away); Referee: Simon Mather

7 April 2023 39	Stevenage	1–1	Colchester United	Stevenage
15:00 BST	Gilbey 47'; Vancooten (yellow card) 80'; James-Wildin (yellow card) 83'	Report	Read (yellow card) 10'; Hall 18'; Chambers (yellow card) 90+8'	Stadium: The Lamex Stadium; Attendance: 4,763 (624 away supporters); Referee: James Oldham

10 April 2023 40	Hartlepool United	1–1	Stevenage	Hartlepool
15:00 BST	Murray (yellow card) 28'; Featherstone 46'	Report	Rose 25'; Vancooten (yellow card) 43'; Gilbey (yellow card) 57'; Forster-Caskey (yellow card) 90+1'	Stadium: The Suit Direct Stadium; Attendance: 5,687 (171 away supporters); Referee: Paul Howard

15 April 2023 41	Stevenage	2–1	AFC Wimbledon	Stevenage
15:00 BST	Roberts 4'; Reid 61'; Bostwick (yellow card) 90'; Rose (yellow card) 90+4'; Steve Evans (yellow card) off pitch'	Report	Al-Hamadi 11'; Nightingale (yellow card) 82'	Stadium: The Lamex Stadium; Attendance: 4,062 (694 away supporters); Referee: James Bell

18 April 2023 42	Stevenage	1–0	Doncaster Rovers	Stevenage
19:45 BST	Roberts 13'; James-Wildin (yellow card) 63'; Rose (yellow card) 84'; Reid (yellow card) 90+5'	Report	Faulkner (yellow card) 77'	Stadium: The Lamex Stadium; Attendance: 2,990 (179 away supporters); Referee: Craig Hicks

22 April 2023 43	Mansfield Town	1–0	Stevenage	Mansfield
15:00 BST	Keillor-Dunn 11'; Gale (yellow card) 13'	Report	Sweeney (yellow card) 15'	Stadium: One Call Stadium; Attendance: 6,863; Referee: James Linington

25 April 2023 44	Swindon Town	0–1	Stevenage	Swindon
19:45 BST		Report	Reid 25'; Clark (yellow card) 90+7'	Stadium: The County Ground; Attendance: 8,289 (including 311 away supporters); Referee: Ben Speedie

29 April 2023 45	Stevenage	2–0	Grimsby Town	Stevenage
15:00 BST	Reid 57'; James-Wildin 67'	Report	Holohan (yellow card) 58'	Stadium: The Lamex Stadium; Attendance: 6,533; Referee: Will Finnie

8 May 2023 46	Barrow	0–1	Stevenage	Barrow-in-Furness
12:30 BST	Farman (yellow card) 45+1'	Report	Reeves 25'; Forster-Caskey (yellow card) 45+1'	Stadium: SO Legal Stadium; Attendance: 4,034 (425 away); Referee: Andrew Kitchen

=== FA Cup ===
Stevenage were drawn away to Gateshead in the first round, King's Lynn Town in the second round, Aston Villa in the third round and Stoke City in the fourth round.

Win Draw Loss Fixtures

5 November 2022 First round	Gateshead	2–3	Stevenage	Gateshead
15:00 GMT	Harris 53'; Conteh 62'; Mills (yellow card) 82'	Report	Roberts 21' (red card) 82'; Richardson 34' (o.g.); Norris 72'; Gilbey (yellow card) 79'	Stadium: Gateshead International Stadium; Attendance: 1,059; Referee: Peter Wright

26 November 2022 Second round	King's Lynn Town	0–3	Stevenage	King's Lynn
12:45 GMT		Report	Norris 49', 51'; Reid 54'	Stadium: The Walks; Attendance: 4,203; Referee: Andrew Kitchen

7 January 2023 Third round	Aston Villa	1–2	Stevenage	Birmingham
15:00 GMT	Sanson 33'; Dendoncker (red card) 85'	Report	Reid 88' (pen.); Campbell 90'	Stadium: Villa Park; Attendance: 32,343; Referee: Graham Scott

29 January 2023 Fourth round	Stoke City	3–1	Stevenage	Stoke-on-Trent
14:00 GMT	Brown 3'; Smallbone (yellow card) 50'; Laurent 73'; Baker 80' (pen.)	Report	Reid 70'	Stadium: Bet365 Stadium; Attendance: 14,392; Referee: David Webb

=== EFL Cup ===
Win Draw Loss Fixtures

Stevenage were drawn away to Reading in the first round and at home to Peterborough United in the second round. For the first time in the club's history, Stevenage advanced to the third round of the EFL Cup, where they were defeated by Charlton Athletic on penalties.

9 August 2022 First round	Reading	1–2	Stevenage	Reading
20:00 BST	Abrefa (yellow card) 42'; Ehibhatiomhan 63', (yellow card) 90+1'	Report	Earley 10', (yellow card) 38'; Campbell (yellow card) 58'; Rose 89'	Stadium: Select Car Leasing Stadium; Attendance: 4,230; Referee: Carl Brook

23 August 2022 Second round	Stevenage	1–0	Peterborough United	Stevenage
19:45 BST	Taylor (yellow card) 70'; Reid 90+3'	Report	Knight (yellow card) 64'	Stadium: Lamex Stadium; Attendance: 2,292; Referee: Christopher Pollard

8 November 2022 Third round	Stevenage	1–1 (4–5 p)	Charlton Athletic	Stevenage
19:45 GMT	Norris 22' (pen.); Read (yellow card) 25'; Rose (yellow card) 31'	Report	Chin (yellow card) 21'; Aneke 87'; Clare (yellow card) 90+5'; Lavelle (yellow card) 90+6'	Stadium: Lamex Stadium; Attendance: 3,515; Referee: Tom Nield
	Penalties
	Rose (penalty scored); Campbell (penalty scored); Sweeney (penalty scored); Bostwick (penalty scored); Taylor (penalty missed)		Clare (penalty scored); Forster-Caskey (penalty scored); Rak Sakyi (penalty scored); Aneke (penalty scored); Fraser (penalty scored)

=== EFL Trophy ===
Pos	Div	Team	Pld	W	PW	PL	L	GF	GA	GD	Pts	Qualification
1	L2	Stevenage	3	3	0	0	0	6	1	+5	9	Advance to Round 2
2	L1	Peterborough United	3	1	0	1	1	5	3	+2	4	Advance to Round 2
3	L1	Wycombe Wanderers	3	0	2	0	1	1	4	−3	4	
4	ACA	Tottenham Hotspur U21	3	0	0	1	2	0	4	−4	1	

Source: EFL.com

Win Draw Loss Fixtures

30 August 2022 Group stage	Peterborough United	1–2	Stevenage	Peterborough
19:30 BST	Jones 9'; Knight (yellow card) 50'	Report	Taylor 18'; Reeves (yellow card) 32'; Earley (yellow card) 50'; Piergianni 84'	Stadium: Weston Homes Stadium; Attendance: 2,420; Referee: Robert Lewis

20 September 2022 Group stage	Stevenage	3–0	Wycombe Wanderers	Stevenage
19:00 BST	Rose 4', 56'; Taylor (yellow card) 62'; Gilbey (yellow card) 69'; Vancooten 81'; Campbell (yellow card) 83'; Clark (yellow card) 86'	Report		Stadium: Lamex Stadium; Attendance: 717; Referee: Sunny Gill

18 October 2022 Group stage	Stevenage	1–0	Tottenham Hotspur U21	Stevenage
19:00 BST	Roberts 23'	Report	John (yellow card) 48' (yellow-red card) 84'	Stadium: Lamex Stadium; Attendance: 1,449; Referee: Sam Barrott

22 November 2022 Second round	Stevenage	3–2	Arsenal U21	Stevenage
19:00 GMT	Reeves (yellow card) 24'; Amoo 51'; Sweeney 69'; Read 75'; Norris (yellow card) 90+5'	Report	Butler-Oyedeji 6'; Cozier-Duberry 74'; Foran (yellow card) 89'	Stadium: Lamex Stadium; Attendance: 2,236; Referee: Craig Hicks

13 December 2022 Third round	Portsmouth	3–0	Stevenage	Milton
19:00 GMT	Dale (yellow card) 18'; Mingi 37'; Koroma 59'; Oluwayemi (yellow card) 73'; Pigott 90+4'	Report		Stadium: Fratton Park; Attendance: 2,162; Referee: Neil Hair
