= Courtney Wildin =

Footballer (born 1996)

Personal information
- Full name: Courtney James Wildin
- Date of birth: 30 March 1996 (age 30)
- Place of birth: Crewe, England
- Height: 6 ft 1 in (1.85 m)
- Position: Left-back

Youth career
- –2015: Aston Villa

Senior career*
Years	Team	Apps	(Gls)
2015–2016	Sheffield Wednesday	0	(0)
2016	→ Gainsborough Trinity (loan)	5	(0)
2016	→ Lincoln City (loan)	4	(0)
2016–2017	Boston United	10	(0)
2016–2017	→ Hednesford Town (loan)	3	(0)
2017	→ Corby Town (loan)		
2017	Nuneaton Town	9	(0)
2017–2018	Nantwich Town	32	(1)
2018–2019	Coalville Town	10	(0)

International career^{‡}
2016–	Antigua and Barbuda	5	(0)
- * Club domestic league appearances and goals ‡ National team caps and goals as of 20:45, 1 March 2019 (UTC)

Courtney James Wildin (born 30 March 1996) is a footballer who most recently played as a left-back for Southern League Premier Central side Coalville Town. Born in England, he represents the Antigua and Barbuda national team at international level.

== Club career ==
=== Sheffield Wednesday ===
Wildin was a youth team player for Aston Villa, before joining Sheffield Wednesday as part of their development squad. In January 2016 he joined Gainsborough Trinity on loan.

In February 2016 he joined Lincoln City on loan before in March, he extended the loan until the end of the season.

He was then released by Sheffield Wednesday at the end of the season.

=== Boston United ===
After his release Wildin joined Boston United.

In December 2016 he joined Hednesford Town on loan before returning on completion of the month loan period. Wildin joined Corby Town on loan on 23 February 2017, and left the club again on 23 April.

=== Nuneaton Town ===
Wildin joined Nuneaton Town in May 2017 along with his brother, Luther Wildin In September he left the club when his contract was terminated by mutual consent.

=== Nantwich Town ===
In October he joined Nantwich Town.

=== Coalville Town ===
Wildin signed for Southern League Premier Central side Coalville Town on 9 June 2018.

In December 2018 he announced that he had been diagnosed with leukaemia.

== International career ==
Wildin was called up by Antigua and Barbuda for the first time in May 2016 and made his full international debut as a second-half substitute on 4 June 2016 for in a Caribbean Cup qualifier against Puerto Rico.

== Personal life ==
Wildin is the brother of Stevenage and fellow Antigua and Barbuda defender Luther Wildin. The beginning of December 2018 he was diagnosed with leukaemia.
