= Donovan Makoma =

French footballer (born 1999)

Personal information
- Date of birth: 1 February 1999 (age 27)
- Place of birth: Lille, France
- Height: 1.85 m (6 ft 1 in)
- Position: Midfielder

Team information
- Current team: Birkirkara
- Number: 59

Youth career
- Lens

Senior career*
Years	Team	Apps	(Gls)
2017–2018	Barrow	17	(1)
2018–2019	Stevenage	0	(0)
2018	→ Woking (loan)	2	(0)
2018–2019	→ Biggleswade Town (loan)	7	(0)
2019	→ Wingate & Finchley (loan)	8	(1)
2019–2020	Arras	7	(0)
2021–2022	UE Santa Coloma	25	(3)
2022–2024	FC Cosmos Koblenz	66	(6)
2024	FC Karbach	16	(1)
2025–	Birkirkara	44	(4)

International career
- France U16
- * Club domestic league appearances and goals as of 18 May 2026

Donovan Makoma (born 1 February 1999) is a French professional footballer who plays for Maltese Premier League club Birkirkara as a midfielder.

== Club career ==
Born in Lille, after playing with Lens, Makoma signed for English club Barrow in July 2017.

He moved to Stevenage in July 2018. He made his professional debut on 14 August 2018, in the EFL Cup.

On 12 October 2018, Makoma joined National League South club Woking on a 28-day loan.

On 21 December 2018, it was announced that Makoma would join Southern League side, Biggleswade Town on a one-month loan.

In February 2019, he joined Wingate & Finchley on loan until the end of the season.

He was made available for sale by Stevenage at the end of the 2018–19 season.

Following his release from Stevenage, Makoma returned to France to join Arras, before moving to Andorran club UE Santa Coloma.

== International career ==
He represented France at under-16 youth level.

== Career statistics ==
As of match played 29 February 2020

Club	Season	League			National Cup		League Cup		Other		Total	
Club	Season	Division	Apps	Goals	Apps	Goals	Apps	Goals	Apps	Goals	Apps	Goals
Barrow	2017–18	National League	17	1	0	0	—		3 (Note: Appearance(s) in FA Trophy.)	0	20	1
Stevenage	2018–19	League Two	0	0	0	0	1	0	2 (Note: Appearance(s) in EFL Trophy.)	0	3	0
Woking (loan)	2018–19	National League South	2	0	0	0	—		0	0	2	0
Biggleswade Town (loan)	2018–19	Southern League Premier Division Central	No data currently available									
Wingate & Finchley (loan)	2018–19	Isthmian League Premier Division	8	1	—		—		—		8	1
Arras	2019–20	Championnat National 3 Group I	7	0	0	0	—		—		7	0
Career total			34	2	0	0	1	0	5	0	40	2
