= 2018–19 Stevenage F.C. season =

Stevenage F.C.
2018–19 season
- Chairman: Phil Wallace
- Manager: Dino Maamria
- League Two: 10th
- FA Cup: First round
- EFL Cup: First round
- EFL Trophy: Group stage
- Top goalscorer: League: Kurtis Guthrie (11); All: Kurtis Guthrie (14)
Home colours	Away colours

The 2018–19 season was Stevenage's fifth consecutive season in League Two and their 43rd year in existence. Along with competing in League Two, the club participated in the FA Cup, EFL Cup and EFL Trophy.

The season covers the period from 1 July 2018 to 30 June 2019.

== Competitions ==
=== Friendlies ===
Stevenage announced pre-season fixtures with St Albans City, Portsmouth and St Neots Town on 15 May 2018.

10 July 2018 Friendly	St Albans City	1–3	Stevenage	St Albans
19:45 BST	Banton 54'	Report	Sonupe 5'; Trialist 57', 66'	Stadium: Clarence Park

14 July 2018 Friendly	Stevenage	3–2	Portsmouth	Stevenage
15:00 BST	Kennedy 30'; Georgiou 57', 70'	Report	Evans 20'; Chaplin 89'	Stadium: Broadhall Way

17 July 2018 Friendly	St Neots Town	0–3	Stevenage	St Neots
19:45 BST		Report	Revell 6' (pen.), 61'; Trialist 63'	Stadium: Rowley Park

21 July 2018 Friendly	Stevenage	2–0	Coventry City	Stevenage
14:00 BST	Ball 24'; Nugent 34'	Report		Stadium: Broadhall Way

24 July 2018 Friendly	Stevenage	1–2	Crystal Palace	Stevenage
19:45 BST	Reid 18'	Report	Williams 44'; Kaikai 89'	Stadium: Broadhall Way

27 July 2018 Friendly	Stevenage	0–1	Watford	Stevenage
19:30 BST		Report	Gray 88'	Stadium: Broadhall Way

=== League Two ===
==== League table ====
Pos	Team	Pld	W	D	L	GF	GA	GD	Pts
8	Colchester United	46	20	10	16	65	53	+12	70
9	Exeter City	46	19	13	14	60	49	+11	70
10	Stevenage	46	20	10	16	59	55	+4	70
11	Carlisle United	46	20	8	18	67	62	+5	68
12	Crewe Alexandra	46	19	8	19	60	59	+1	65

Source: EFL Official Website
Rules for classification: 1) Points; 2) Goal difference; 3) Number of goals scored; 4) Head-to-head results

==== Results summary ====
Overall								Home						Away					
Pld	W	D	L	GF	GA	GD	Pts	W	D	L	GF	GA	GD	W	D	L	GF	GA	GD
46	20	10	16	59	55	+4	70	12	3	8	28	23	+5	8	7	8	31	32	−1

Last updated: 4 May 2019.
Source: BBC Sport

==== Results by matchday ====
Matchday	1	2	3	4	5	6	7	8	9	10	11	12	13	14	15	16	17	18	19	20	21	22	23	24	25	26	27	28	29	30	31	32	33	34	35	36	37	38	39	40	41	42	43	44	45	46
Ground	H	A	H	A	A	H	H	A	H	A	A	H	A	H	H	A	H	A	H	A	H	A	H	A	A	H	A	H	A	H	H	A	A	H	A	H	H	A	A	H	A	H	A	H	A	H
Result	D	W	W	D	L	L	W	D	W	W	L	W	L	L	D	W	W	L	W	L	L	D	L	W	L	W	L	W	W	L	W	L	D	L	D	L	W	D	D	L	W	W	W	D	W	W
Position	11	6	3	4	9	13	11	13	9	4	7	5	7	10	10	8	7	9	8	9	10	11	12	10	12	11	11	10	9	9	9	10	9	10	11	11	10	10	11	12	12	11	10	10	11	10

Updated to match(es) played on 4 May 2019. Source: Statto.com
A = Away; H = Home; W = Win; D = Draw; L = Loss

==== Matches ====
On 21 June 2018, the League Two fixtures for the forthcoming season were announced.

4 August 2018 1	Stevenage	2–2	Tranmere Rovers	Stevenage
15:00 BST	Ball 20'; Byrom 27'; Hunt (red card) 74'	Report	Norwood 33', 55'; Harris (yellow card) 91'	Stadium: Broadhall Way; Attendance: 3,315; Referee: Charles Breakspear

11 August 2018 2	Crawley Town	1–3	Stevenage	Crawley
15:00 BST	Palmer 53'	Report	Reid 48'; Revell 88', 90+5'	Stadium: Broadfield Stadium; Attendance: 2,102; Referee: Peter Wright

18 August 2018 3	Stevenage	1–0	Morecambe	Stevenage
15:00 BST	Timlin 45'	Report		Stadium: Broadhall Way; Attendance: 2,030; Referee: Matt Donohue

21 August 2018 4	Forest Green Rovers	0–0	Stevenage	Nailsworth
19:45 BST		Report		Stadium: The New Lawn; Attendance: 1,834; Referee: Brett Huxtable

25 August 2018 5	Yeovil Town	2–0	Stevenage	Yeovil
15:00 BST	Fisher 24'; D'Almeida 42'	Report	Timlin (red card) 87'	Stadium: Huish Park; Attendance: 2,635; Referee: Tom Nield

1 September 2018 6	Stevenage	0–1	Cambridge United	Stevenage
15:00 BST		Report	Amoo 17'	Stadium: Broadhall Way; Attendance: 2,998; Referee: Paul Marsden

8 September 2018 7	Stevenage	1–0	Macclesfield Town	Stevenage
15:00 BST	Newton 41'	Report		Stadium: Broadhall Way; Attendance: 2,282; Referee: Seb Stockbridge

15 September 2018 8	Notts County	3–3	Stevenage	Nottingham
15:00 BST	Stead 22' (pen.); Boldewijn 43'; Hemmings 49'	Report	Kennedy 38'; Revell 45'; Newton 73'	Stadium: Meadow Lane; Attendance: 6,085; Referee: Ross Joyce

22 September 2018 9	Stevenage	1–0	Grimsby Town	Stevenage
15:00 BST	Seddon 83'	Report		Stadium: Broadhall Way; Attendance: 2,332; Referee: Lee Collins

29 September 2018 10	Carlisle United	0–1	Stevenage	Carlisle
15:00 BST		Report	Kennedy 56'	Stadium: Brunton Park; Attendance: 4,200; Referee: Scott Oldham

2 October 2018 11	Exeter City	1–0	Stevenage	Exeter
19:45 BST	Moxey 45+6'	Report	Wildin (red card) 83'	Stadium: St James Park; Attendance: 3,671; Referee: Antony Coggins

6 October 2018 12	Stevenage	3–1	Colchester United	Stevenage
15:00 BST	Guthrie 41'; Kennedy 82' (pen.); Sonupe 84'; Ball (yellow card) 33'; Guthrie (yellow card) 43'; Seddon (yellow card) 61'	Report	Szmodics 2'; Prosser (yellow card) 53'; Nouble (yellow card) 86'	Stadium: Broadhall Way; Attendance: 2,763; Referee: Nick Kinseley

13 October 2018 13	Newport County	2–1	Stevenage	Newport
15:00 BST (UTC+1)	Dolan 1'; Semenyo 90+8'	Report	Wildin 45+1'	Stadium: Rodney Parade; Attendance: 3,126; Referee: Keith Stroud

20 October 2018 14	Stevenage	0–1	Crewe Alexandra	Stevenage
15:00 BST	Nugent (red card) 12'	Report	Bowery 61'	Stadium: Broadhall Way; Attendance: 2,164; Referee: Craig Hicks

23 October 2018 15	Stevenage	0–0	Port Vale	Stevenage
19:45 BST		Report		Stadium: Broadhall Way; Attendance: 1,943; Referee: Charles Breakspear

27 October 2018 16	Cheltenham Town	0–2	Stevenage	Cheltenham
15:00 BST		Report	Guthrie 18'; Seddon 45+1'; Cuthbert (yellow card) 56'; Hunt (yellow card) 67'	Stadium: Whaddon Road; Attendance: 2,382; Referee: Matt Donohue

3 November 2018 17	Stevenage	3–2	Oldham Athletic	Stevenage
15:00 GMT	Byrom 22'; Timlin (yellow card) 40'; Guthrie 68'; Kennedy (yellow card) 80'; Newton 81'	Report	Miller 11'; Lang 63'	Stadium: Broadhall Way; Attendance: 2,583; Referee: Graham Scott

17 November 2018 18	Bury	4–0	Stevenage	Bury
15:00 GMT	O'Shea 63', 78'; Mayor 68'; O'Connell 83'	Report	Guthrie (red card) 41'	Stadium: Gigg Lane; Attendance: 3,385; Referee: Tom Nield

24 November 2018 19	Stevenage	3–2	Milton Keynes Dons	Stevenage
15:00 GMT	Seddon 21'; Cuthbert 84'; Kennedy 90'	Report	Healey 29'; Agard 68'	Stadium: Broadhall Way; Attendance: 3,263; Referee: Brett Huxtable

27 November 2018 20	Swindon Town	3–2	Stevenage	Swindon
19:45 GMT	Pryce 1', 45+2'; Twine 6'	Report	Cuthbert 14'; Reid 78'	Stadium: County Ground; Referee: Charles Breakspear

8 December 2018 21	Stevenage	0–1	Lincoln City	Stevenage
15:00 GMT		Report	Akinde 11' (pen.)	Stadium: Broadhall Way; Attendance: 3,552; Referee: Lee Collins

15 December 2018 22	Northampton Town	1–1	Stevenage	Northampton
15:00 GMT	Bowditch 45+2'	Report	Kennedy 75'; Timlin (yellow card) 89'	Stadium: Sixfields Stadium; Attendance: 4,756; Referee: Chris Sarginson

22 December 2018 23	Stevenage	1–3	Mansfield Town	Stevenage
15:00 GMT	Newton 45+2'; Iontton (yellow card) 66'	Report	Preston (yellow card) 19'; Mellis (yellow card) 50'; Sweeney 55'; Walker 77', 86'	Stadium: Broadhall Way; Attendance: 2,761; Referee: Dean Whitestone

26 December 2018 24	Colchester United	1–2	Stevenage	Colchester
15:00 GMT	Kent (yellow card) 39'; Prosser (yellow card) 56' (goal) 83'; Jackson (yellow card) 74'	Report	Gilmartin 5' (o.g.); Byrom (yellow card) 21'; Newton 36'; Vancooten (yellow card) 65'; Campbell-Ryce (yellow card) 85'; Farman (yellow card) 88'	Stadium: Colchester Community Stadium; Attendance: 5,032; Referee: Lee Collins

29 December 2018 25	Crewe Alexandra	1–0	Stevenage	Crewe
15:00 GMT	Porter 21' (pen.); Ray (yellow card) 60'	Report	Guthrie (yellow card) 74'; Reid (red card) 79'; Kennedy (yellow card) 79'	Stadium: Gresty Road; Attendance: 3,625; Referee: Anthony Backhouse

1 January 2019 26	Stevenage	1–0	Newport County	Stevenage
15:00 GMT	Guthrie (red card) 39'; Timlin (yellow card) 78'; Revell 85'	Report	Hornby-Forbes (yellow card) 60'; Franks (yellow card) 79'; Bennett (yellow card) 88'	Stadium: Broadhall Way; Attendance: 2,299; Referee: Andy Haines

5 January 2019 27	Cambridge United	2–0	Stevenage	Cambridge
15:00 GMT	Lewis (yellow card) 28'; Amoo 35'; Deegan (yellow card) 42'; Brown 45+2'	Report	Cuthbert (yellow card) 66'; Timlin (yellow card) 82'; Nugent (yellow card) 90+2'	Stadium: Abbey Stadium; Attendance: 4,235; Referee: Trevor Kettle

12 January 2019 28	Stevenage	2–1	Crawley Town	Stevenage
15:00 GMT	Ball 24', 40'	Report	Poleon 36'; Payne (yellow card) 42'	Stadium: Broadhall Way; Attendance: 2,347; Referee: Thomas Bramall

19 January 2019 29	Morecambe	1–2	Stevenage	Morecambe
15:00 GMT	Ellison 70'	Report	Kennedy 25' (pen.); Timlin (yellow card) 64'; Wilkinson 90+4'	Stadium: Globe Arena; Attendance: 1,422; Referee: Graham Salisbury

26 January 2019 30	Stevenage	0–2	Forest Green Rovers	Stevenage
15:00 GMT	Nugent (yellow card) 29'	Report	Shephard 13'; Montgomery (yellow card) 35'; Doidge 55'	Stadium: Broadhall Way; Attendance: 2,494; Referee: Darren Drysdale

2 February 2019 31	Stevenage	1–0	Yeovil Town	Stevenage
15:00 GMT	Revell 72'	Report		Stadium: Broadhall Way; Attendance: 2,157; Referee: John Busby

9 February 2019 32	Tranmere Rovers	2–0	Stevenage	Birkenhead
15:00 GMT	Morris 45+4'; Norwood 79'	Report	Byrom (yellow card) 42'; Nugent (yellow card) 49' (yellow-red card) 75'; Adebayo (red card) 90+3'	Stadium: Prenton Park; Attendance: 5,283; Referee: Eddie Ilderton

16 February 2019 33	Lincoln City	2–2	Stevenage	Lincoln
15:00 GMT	Andrade 48', 71'; Bolger (yellow card) 51'; Akinde (yellow card) 88'; Toffolo (yellow card) 89'	Report	Chair 87', 90+4'; Wildin (yellow card) 89'	Stadium: Sincil Bank; Attendance: 9,036; Referee: Jeremy Simpson

23 February 2019 34	Stevenage	1–2	Northampton Town	Stevenage
15:00 GMT	Timlin (yellow card) 51'; Revell 79'; Farman (yellow card) 90+3'	Report	Powell (yellow card) 14' (goal) 19'; Goode (yellow card) 47'; O'Toole (yellow card) 64'; Hoskins (yellow card) 87'; Foley (yellow card) 90+1'; Williams 90+1'	Stadium: Broadhall Way; Attendance: 3,540; Referee: Lee Swabey

2 March 2019 35	Oldham Athletic	1–1	Stevenage	Oldham
15:00 GMT	Baxter 47'	Report	Wilkinson (yellow card) 42'; Guthrie 90+1'	Stadium: Boundary Park; Attendance: 3,807; Referee: Christopher Sarginson

9 March 2019 36	Stevenage	0–1	Bury	Stevenage
15:00 GMT		Report	O'Connell (yellow card) 74'; Rossiter (yellow card) 87'; Maynard 90+5'	Stadium: Broadhall Way; Attendance: 3,530; Referee: John Busby

12 March 2019 37	Stevenage	2–0	Swindon Town	Stevenage
19:45 GMT	Revell 36'; Chair 90+5'	Report	Woolery (yellow card) 27'; Diagouraga (yellow card) 56'	Stadium: Broadhall Way; Attendance: 2,194; Referee: Craig Hicks

16 March 2019 38	Milton Keynes Dons	1–1	Stevenage	Denbigh
15:00 GMT	Aneke 83'	Report	Timlin (yellow card) 23'; Chair 30'; Revell (yellow card) 70'; Cuthbert (yellow card) 90+4'	Stadium: Stadium mk Attendance: 7,365; Referee: Martin Coy

23 March 2019 39	Macclesfield Town	2–2	Stevenage	Macclesfield
15:00 GMT	Durrell 42'; Stephens (yellow card) 61'; Rose (yellow card) 78'; Whitaker 90+3'	Report	Nugent 44'; Newton 52'	Stadium: Moss Rose; Attendance: 1,866; Referee: Dean Whitestone

30 March 2019 40	Stevenage	0–3	Notts County	Stevenage
15:00 GMT		Report	O'Brien 1'; Hemmings 21'; Boldewijn 45'	Stadium: Broadhall Way; Attendance: 2,860; Referee: Andy Haines

6 April 2019 41	Grimsby Town	0–2	Stevenage	Cleethorpes
15:00 BST	Clifton (yellow card) 54'	Report	Guthrie 23', 50'; Martin (yellow card) 45+2'	Stadium: Blundell Park; Attendance: 3,689; Referee: Trevor Kettle

13 April 2019 42	Stevenage	3–0	Carlisle United	Stevenage
15:00 BST	Iontton 16'; Guthrie 52', 62' (pen.)	Report	Miller (yellow card) 30'; Parkes (yellow card) 89'	Stadium: Broadhall Way; Attendance: 2,770; Referee: Carl Boyeson

19 April 2019 43	Port Vale	1–4	Stevenage	Burslem
15:00 BST	Montaño 67'	Report	Sonupe 12', 50'; Timlin (yellow card) 55'; Nugent (yellow card) 68'; Hunt (yellow card) 77'; Chair 84'; Farman (yellow card) 90+1'; Guthrie 90+5'	Stadium: Vale Park; Attendance: 4,088; Referee: Nick Kinseley

22 April 2019 44	Stevenage	1–1	Exeter City	Stevenage
15:00 BST	Guthrie 28'; Farman (yellow card) 88'	Report	Moxey (yellow card) 36'; Bowman 40' (yellow card) 90+5'	Stadium: Broadhall Way; Attendance: 3,195; Referee: Oliver Yates

27 April 2019 45	Mansfield Town	1–2	Stevenage	Mansfield
15:00 BST	Pearce (yellow card) 38'; Walker 83'	Report	Timlin (yellow card) 3'; Guthrie 71'; Chair 90+1'	Stadium: Field Mill; Attendance: 6,390; Referee: Darren Drysdale

4 May 2019 46	Stevenage	2–0	Cheltenham Town	Stevenage
15:00 BST	Martin 56'; Gibson 58'	Report	Maddox (yellow card) 69'	Stadium: Broadhall Way; Attendance: 3,071; Referee: Dean Whitestone

=== FA Cup ===
The first round draw was made live on BBC by Dennis Wise and Dion Dublin on 22 October.

10 November 2018 First round	Plymouth Argyle	1–0	Stevenage	Plymouth
15:00 GMT	Lameiras 90+4'	Report		Stadium: Home Park; Attendance: 5,719; Referee: Lee Collins

=== EFL Cup ===
On 15 June 2018, the draw for the first round was made in Vietnam.

14 August 2018 First round	Norwich City	3–1	Stevenage	Norwich
19:45 BST	Stiepermann 27'; Zimmermann 83'; Pukki 89'	Report	Ball 40'	Stadium: Carrow Road; Attendance: 11,687; Referee: Craig Hicks

=== EFL Trophy ===
On 13 July 2018, the initial group stage draw bar the U21 invited clubs was announced.

Pos	Lge	Team	Pld	W	PW	PL	L	GF	GA	GD	Pts	Qualification
1	ACA	Swansea City U21 (Q)	3	2	0	0	1	2	5	−3	6	Round 2
2	L1	AFC Wimbledon (Q)	3	1	1	0	1	6	3	+3	5	Round 2
3	L1	Charlton Athletic (E)	3	1	0	1	1	10	3	+7	4	
4	L2	Stevenage (E)	3	1	0	0	2	5	12	−7	3	

First match(es) will be played: 4 September 2018. Source: EFL.com
(E) Eliminated; (Q) Qualified to the phase indicated

28 August 2018 Group stages	Stevenage	5–0	Swansea City U21	Stevenage
19:45 BST	Kennedy 44' (pen.), 45+1'; Guthrie 69' (pen.), 81', 90+1'	Report		Stadium: Broadhall Way; Attendance: 470; Referee: Kevin Johnson

9 October 2018 Group stages	Stevenage	0–8	Charlton Athletic	Stevenage
19:45 BST		Report	Pratley 26'; Stevenson 27', 59', 74' (pen.); Ajose 34'; Vetokele 48'; Lapslie 57', 87'	Stadium: Broadhall Way; Attendance: 793

6 November 2018 Group stages	AFC Wimbledon	4–0	Stevenage	Norbiton
19:45 GMT	Appiah 1'; Wordsworth 28'; Garratt 68'; Egan 79'	Report		Stadium: Kingsmeadow; Referee: Gavin Ward

== Transfers ==
=== Transfers in ===
Date from	Position	Nationality	Name	From	Fee	Ref.
1 July 2018	CF	(England)	James Ball	Stockport County	Undisclosed	
1 July 2018	CM	(England)	Joel Byrom	Mansfield Town	Free transfer	
1 July 2018	RW	(Jamaica)	Jamal Campbell-Ryce	Carlisle United	Free transfer	
1 July 2018	CB	(Scotland)	Scott Cuthbert	Luton Town	Free transfer	
1 July 2018	GK	(England)	Paul Farman	Lincoln City	Undisclosed	
1 July 2018	LB	(England)	Johnny Hunt	Mansfield Town	Free transfer	
1 July 2018	RW	(England)	Emmanuel Sonupe	Kidderminster Harriers	Undisclosed	
1 July 2018	CM	(Republic of Ireland)	Michael Timlin	Southend United	Free transfer	
1 July 2018	DM	(Antigua and Barbuda)	Luther Wildin	Nuneaton Town	Undisclosed	
18 July 2018	CB	(England)	Ben Nugent	Gillingham	Free transfer	
19 July 2018	CF	(England)	Alex Reid	Fleetwood Town	Undisclosed	
24 July 2018	GK	(England)	Will Appleyard	Crewe Alexandra	Free transfer	
26 July 2018	CF	(England)	Kurtis Guthrie	Colchester United	Free transfer	
27 July 2018	DM	(France)	Donovan Makoma	Barrow	Undisclosed	
31 January 2019	GK	(England)	Oliver Byrne	Blackburn Rovers	Undisclosed	

=== Transfers out ===
Date from	Position	Nationality	Name	To	Fee	Ref.
1 July 2018	LM	(England)	Tom Conlon	Port Vale	Released	
1 July 2018	CB	(England)	Fraser Franks	(Wales) Newport County	Released	
1 July 2018	CF	(England)	Matt Godden	Peterborough United	Undisclosed	
1 July 2018	CM	(Northern Ireland)	Dale Gorman	Leyton Orient	Released	
1 July 2018	CF	(Republic of Ireland)	Jamie Gray	Free agent	Released	
1 July 2018	DM	(England)	Jack King	Ebbsfleet United	Released	
1 July 2018	CB	(England)	Kevin Lokko	Dover Athletic	Undisclosed	
1 July 2018	CF	(Wales)	Alex Samuel	Wycombe Wanderers	Released	
1 July 2018	RM	(England)	Chris Whelpdale	Chelmsford City	Released	
1 July 2018	CB	(England)	Ben Wilmot	Watford	Undisclosed	
2 July 2018	GK	(England)	Chris Day	Free agent	Mutual consent	
3 July 2018	RW	(England)	Claudio Ofosu	St Neots Town	Free transfer	
6 August 2018	CB	(England)	Ali Omar	Queens Park Rangers	Free transfer	
10 August 2018	FB	(England)	Macsen Fraser	Hitchin Town	Undisclosed	
8 November 2018	CM	(England)	Jonathan Smith	Chesterfield	Mutual consent	
1 January 2019	RB	(Republic of Ireland)	Luke Wade-Slater	(Republic of Ireland) Bohemian	Undisclosed	
4 January 2019	LB	(Northern Ireland)	Ryan Johnson	Kidderminster Harriers	Undisclosed	
18 January 2019	RW	(England)	John Goddard	Aldershot Town	Undisclosed	
28 March 2019	CM	(England)	James Ferry	Woking	Free transfer	

=== Loans in ===
Start date	Position	Nationality	Name	From	End date	Ref.
3 August 2018	GK	(Senegal)	Seny Dieng	Queens Park Rangers	1 January 2019	
30 August 2018	LB	(England)	Steve Seddon	Birmingham City	15 January 2019	
11 January 2019	CM	(England)	Moses Makasi	West Ham United	31 May 2019	
14 January 2019	GK	(England)	Oliver Byrne	Blackburn Rovers	30 January 2019	
31 January 2019	CF	(England)	Elijah Adebayo	Fulham	31 May 2019	
31 January 2019	DM	(Morocco)	Ilias Chair	Queens Park Rangers	31 May 2019	
31 January 2019	CF	(England)	Calum Dyson	Plymouth Argyle	31 May 2019	
31 January 2019	LW	(England)	Jordan Gibson	Bradford City	31 May 2019	

=== Loans out ===
Start date	Position	Nationality	Name	To	End date	Ref.
1 July 2018	LB	(Northern Ireland)	Ryan Johnson	Kidderminster Harriers	1 January 2019	
24 July 2018	CF	(England)	Joe White	Wealdstone	22 August 2018	
7 August 2018	GK	(England)	Will Appleyard	Royston Town	4 September 2018	
17 August 2018	RW	(England)	John Goddard	Bromley	2 January 2019	
29 August 2018	LB	(England)	Joe Martin	Bristol Rovers	1 January 2019	
18 September 2018	CM	(England)	Jonathan Smith	Chesterfield	7 November 2018	
19 September 2018	CF	(England)	Joe White	Biggleswade Town	31 May 2019	
12 October 2018	RB	(France)	Donovan Makoma	Woking	11 November 2018	
6 November 2018	RB	(Republic of Ireland)	Luke Wade-Slater	Kings Langley	31 December 2018	
15 December 2018	CM	(England)	James Ferry	FC Halifax Town	17 March 2019	
21 December 2018	RB	(France)	Donovan Makoma	Biggleswade Town	January 2019	
23 December 2018	CF	(England)	Harry Draper	Great Yarmouth Town	Work experience	
23 December 2018	MF	(England)	Dylan Switters	Great Yarmouth Town	Work experience	
18 January 2019	CF	(Cyprus)	Andronicos Georgiou	Kings Langley	31 May 2019	
19 January 2019	CF	(England)	Harry Draper	Hitchin Town	26 March 2019	
31 January 2019	CF	(Northern Ireland)	Ben Kennedy	(Wales) Newport County	31 May 2019	
8 February 2019	CF	(England)	Alex Reid	AFC Fylde	31 May 2019	
22 February 2019	RB	(France)	Donovan Makoma	Wingate & Finchley	31 May 2019	
27 March 2019	CF	(England)	Harry Draper	Biggleswade Town	31 May 2019	
29 March 2019	GK	(England)	Will Appleyard	Bedford Town	31 May 2019	
