= Joe White (footballer, born 1999) =

English footballer (born 1999)

Personal information
- Full name: Joseph Frederick White
- Date of birth: 16 January 1999 (age 27)
- Place of birth: Camden, London, England
- Positions: Attacking midfielder; centre-forward

Youth career
- 2014–2016: Dagenham & Redbridge

Senior career*
Years	Team	Apps	(Gls)
2016–2018	Dagenham & Redbridge	4	(1)
2017	→ Wealdstone (loan)	17	(6)
2018	→ Hendon (loan)	3	(1)
2018–2020	Stevenage	3	(0)
2018	→ Wealdstone (loan)	5	(1)
2018–2019	→ Biggleswade Town (loan)	29	(20)
2019	→ Biggleswade Town (loan)	14	(8)
2020–2024	Hendon	130	(54)
2024–2026	Hemel Hempstead Town	50	(11)
- * Club domestic league appearances and goals as of 09:43, 29 July 2026 (UTC)

Joseph Frederick White (born 16 January 1999) is an English professional footballer. Initially used solely as a centre-forward, White has been utilised in an attacking midfield role as his career has progressed.

White began his career in the Dagenham & Redbridge youth system, making his first-team debut in November 2016. He had loan spells at Wealdstone and Hendon before signing for Stevenage in January 2018. He subsequently returned to Wealdstone on loan at the start of the 2018–19 season, before spending the remainder of the season on loan at Biggleswade Town, where he was the club's top goalscorer. White rejoined Biggleswade Town on loan for the 2019–20 season, then signed permanently for Hendon in January 2020. Over five years at Hendon, he scored 67 goals in 168 appearances, leaving to join Hemel Hempstead Town in December 2024.

== Early life ==
White was born in Camden, London, and attended Holloway School in nearby Islington.

== Career ==
=== Dagenham & Redbridge ===
White began his career in the youth academy at Dagenham & Redbridge, where he was described as a "prolific goalscorer". He progressed through the club's youth system and was involved in several first-team matchday squads while still a second-year academy scholar. White made his senior debut in a 2–1 defeat to Halifax Town in the FA Cup on 15 November 2016, coming on as a 90th-minute substitute. The following month, he signed his first professional contract, a deal running until the summer of 2018.

After making three first-team appearances for Dagenham during the first half of the 2016–17 season, White joined National League South club Wealdstone on loan on 9 February 2017, in order to gain match experience. He made his Wealdstone debut two days later, playing the full 90 minutes in a 1–1 home draw with Oxford City. White scored his first goal for the club on 28 February 2017, opening the scoring from close range in a 3–0 away victory at St Albans City. The goal served as the catalyst for a run of five goals in seven matches, which included White scoring decisive goals in three successive 2–1 away wins. He made 21 appearances in all competitions during the loan agreement, scoring seven goals, before returning to Dagenham at the end of the season.

Having made two first-team appearances for Dagenham at the start of the 2017–18 season, White signed a new three-year contract extension on 31 August 2017. Dagenham manager John Still stated the contract extension was due to White's "rapid improvement" and described it as a reward for his hard work. In Dagenham's next match, White scored his first goal for the club in a 3–1 home victory over Gateshead on 2 September 2017. He did not feature for Dagenham again due to injury, and subsequently joined Isthmian League Premier Division club Hendon on a one-month loan on 9 January 2018 in a bid to regain match fitness. White made his competitive debut for Hendon in a 3–0 defeat to National League opposition Sutton United in the FA Trophy on 14 January 2018. In the club's next match, a Middlesex Senior Cup quarter-final, he scored five goals in a 9–1 home victory against Spelthorne Sports. He scored six times in six appearances during the loan spell before being recalled by Dagenham a week early ahead of a proposed transfer before the January transfer deadline.

=== Stevenage ===
White joined League Two club Stevenage on 31 January 2018, signing for an undisclosed fee and on a 2 1/2-year contract. Stevenage chairman Phil Wallace stated the club had previously attempted to sign White on several occasions and urged him to "learn his trade" from fellow striker Alex Revell. He made his Stevenage debut on 17 February 2018, coming on as a 90th-minute substitute in the club's 4–1 victory against Yeovil Town at Broadhall Way.

Ahead of the 2018–19 season, on 24 July 2018, White returned to Wealdstone on a 28-day loan deal. Having scored once in his opening five appearances at Wealdstone, the loan was extended for a further 28 days on 22 August 2018. White returned to Stevenage upon the expiration of the loan and subsequently joined Biggleswade Town of the Southern League Premier Division Central on 19 September 2018, on a three-month loan agreement. The loan agreement was extended for the remainder of the 2018–19 season in December 2018. White scored 23 goals in 34 appearances in all competitions during his time at Biggleswade, finishing as the club's leading goalscorer for the season. He rejoined Biggleswade on loan on 15 July 2019, scoring 13 times in 23 appearances during the first half of the 2019–20 season.

=== Hendon ===
White rejoined Southern League Premier Division South club Hendon for an undisclosed fee on 8 January 2020. The transfer meant White would be playing under manager Lee Allinson, who had managed him during his two loan spells at Biggleswade Town. He scored nine times in nine matches before Hendon's season was curtailed because of the COVID-19 pandemic in March 2020. After scoring five times in 13 appearances during the opening months of the 2020–21 season, the Southern Football League season was curtailed again because of restrictions associated with the COVID-19 pandemic. White signed a new one-year contract with Hendon on 6 May 2021, scoring 18 times in 35 appearances during the 2021–22 season.

He was made captain during Hendon's 2022–23 season and finished as the club's top goalscorer with 17 goals in 47 appearances. White signed a new one-year contract with the club on 4 May 2023 and was utilised in an attacking midfield role during the 2023–24 season, scoring 14 goals in 49 appearances. He departed Hendon on 12 December 2024, exercising a clause in his contract that permitted him to leave following the departure of manager Lee Allinson.

=== Hemel Hempstead Town ===
A day after leaving Hendon, White signed for National League South club Hemel Hempstead Town, once again reuniting with manager Allinson. Over two seasons, he made 55 appearances and scored 12 goals from midfield before departing at the end of the 2025–26 season.

== Style of play ==
White began his career as a centre-forward, a position he played throughout his youth career and during his first six years in senior football. Upon signing for Stevenage, he was characterised as an old-fashioned number 9 and encouraged to learn from fellow centre-forward Alex Revell. In April 2023, while Hendon's leading goalscorer, he was moved into a central midfield role, later stating that he had always felt his game was better suited to a deeper role. He featured primarily as an attacking midfielder during the 2023–24 season. He has also been the designated penalty taker at Biggleswade Town, Hendon and Hemel Hempstead.

== Career statistics ==
As of match played 28 April 2026

Appearances and goals by club, season and competition
Club	Season	League			FA Cup		League Cup		Other		Total	
Club	Season	Division	Apps	Goals	Apps	Goals	Apps	Goals	Apps	Goals	Apps	Goals
Dagenham & Redbridge	2016–17	National League	1	0	1	0	—		1 (Note: Appearance(s) in FA Trophy)	0	3	0
Dagenham & Redbridge	2017–18	National League	3	1	0	0	—		0	0	3	1
Dagenham & Redbridge	Total		4	1	1	0	0	0	1	0	6	1
Wealdstone (loan)	2016–17	National League South	17	6	—		—		4 (Note: Three appearances and one goal in Middlesex Senior Charity Cup; one appearance in Middlesex Senior Cup)	1	21	7
Hendon (loan)	2017–18	Isthmian League Premier Division	3	1	—		—		3 (Note: One appearance in Alan Turvey Trophy; one appearance and five goals in Middlesex Senior Cup; one appearance in FA Trophy)	5	6	6
Stevenage	2017–18	League Two	3	0	—		—		—		3	0
Stevenage	2018–19	League Two	0	0	0	0	0	0	0	0	0	0
Stevenage	2019–20	League Two	0	0	0	0	0	0	0	0	0	0
Stevenage	Total		3	0	0	0	0	0	0	0	3	0
Wealdstone (loan)	2018–19	National League South	5	1	0	0	—		0	0	5	1
Biggleswade Town (loan)	2018–19	Southern League Premier Division Central	29	20	0	0	—		5	3	34	23
Biggleswade Town (loan)	2019–20	Southern League Premier Division Central	14	8	3	0	—		6 (Note: One appearance and three goals in Bedfordshire Senior Cup; four appearances and two goals in FA Trophy; one appearance in Southern Football League Cup)	5	23	13
Biggleswade Town (loan)	Total		43	28	3	0	0	0	11	8	57	36
Hendon	2019–20	Southern League Premier Division South	9	9	—		—		0	0	9	9
Hendon	2020–21	Southern League Premier Division South	8	3	2	0	—		3 (Note: One appearance in FA Trophy; two appearances and two goals in London Senior Cup)	2	13	5
Hendon	2021–22	Southern League Premier Division South	31	17	0	0	—		4 (Note: Appearances and goal in London Senior Cup)	1	35	18
Hendon	2022–23	Southern League Premier Division South	37	13	5	3	—		5 (Note: One appearance in FA Trophy; three appearances and one goal in London Senior Cup; one appearance in Middlesex Senior Cup)	1	47	17
Hendon	2023–24	Southern League Premier Division South	35	8	1	0	—		13	6	49	14
Hendon	2024–25	Southern League Premier Division South	11	4	2	0	—		2	0	15	4
Hendon	Total		130	54	10	3	0	0	27	10	168	67
Hemel Hempstead Town	2024–25	National League South	23	5	—		—		0	0	23	5
Hemel Hempstead Town	2025–26	National League South	27	6	4	1	—		1	0	32	7
Hemel Hempstead Town	Total		50	11	4	1	0	0	1	0	55	12
Career total			255	102	18	4	0	0	47	24	320	130
