= Mackye Townsend-West =

English association football player

Personal information
- Full name: Mackye Dre Townsend West
- Date of birth: 1 August 2003 (age 23)
- Place of birth: Camden, England
- Position: Centre-back

Team information
- Current team: Enfield Town

Youth career
- 2019–2020: Stevenage

Senior career*
Years	Team	Apps	(Gls)
2020–2023	Stevenage	2	(0)
2022	→ St Albans City (loan)	4	(0)
2022–2023	→ Royston Town (loan)	12	(0)
2023–2024	Royston Town	10	(0)
2024–2025	Ware	29	(0)
2025–2026	Wingate & Finchley	30	(1)
2026–	Enfield Town	5	(0)

International career^{‡}
2024–	Montserrat	9	(0)
- * Club domestic league appearances and goals as of 12:07, 13 November 2026 (UTC) ‡ National team caps and goals as of 15:49, 13 November 2026 (UTC)

Mackye Dre Townsend West (born 1 August 2003) is a professional footballer who plays as a centre-back for Isthmian League Premier Division club Enfield Town. Born in England, he represents the Montserrat national team.

A graduate of the Stevenage academy, Townsend-West made his first-team debut for the club in October 2020. During his time at Stevenage, he had loan spells with St Albans City and Royston Town, the latter of which he joined permanently in July 2023. After one season at Royston, he signed for Ware, before joining Wingate & Finchley in July 2025.

== Career ==
=== Stevenage ===
Townsend-West joined the Stevenage academy in 2019 after impressing academy scouts during a trial match. He made his professional debut in the club's 3–2 EFL Trophy defeat against Milton Keynes Dons at Broadhall Way on 6 October 2020. Townsend-West signed his first professional contract with Stevenage on 15 October 2020. He made one appearance during the 2021–22 season, having missed eight months due to injury, and was retained by the club in May 2022.

Ahead of the 2022–23 season, Stevenage manager Steve Evans indicated that Townsend-West would be loaned out to gain first-team experience once he had recovered from a pre-season injury. He joined St Albans City of the National League South on 5 August 2022, on a loan agreement until January 2023, making five appearances. Townsend-West was recalled by Stevenage in December 2022 and subsequently loaned to Southern League Premier Division Central club Royston Town, where he made 12 appearances. He was released by Stevenage at the conclusion of the 2022–23 season.

=== Non-League ===
Townsend-West signed for Royston Town on a permanent basis on 25 July 2023, making 12 appearances during the 2023–24 season, which included the first red card of his senior career in a 1–1 draw away to Coalville Town. He spent the 2024–25 season with Ware of the Southern League Premier Division Central, making 31 appearances. In July 2025, Townsend-West joined Isthmian League Premier Division club Wingate & Finchley. In October 2026, he joined Enfield Town.

== International career ==
Born in England, Townsend-West is eligible to represent Montserrat through his descent. He received his first call-up to the Montserrat national team in October 2024, making his debut in a 1–0 victory against Bonaire on 10 October 2024.

== Style of play ==
Primarily a full-back during his time in the Stevenage academy, Townsend-West has played across all back four positions and as part of a back three. He was deployed as a centre-back at Ware, a position he has predominantly occupied for both club and country thereafter. Academy manager Robbie O'Keefe highlighted his pace and technical ability as key attributes.

== Career statistics ==
As of end of 2024–25 season

=== Club ===
Appearances and goals by club, season and competition
Club	Season	League			FA Cup		EFL Cup		Other		Total	
Club	Season	Division	Apps	Goals	Apps	Goals	Apps	Goals	Apps	Goals	Apps	Goals
Stevenage	2020–21	League Two	0	0	0	0	0	0	1 (Note: Appearance in EFL Trophy)	0	1	0
Stevenage	2021–22	League Two	0	0	0	0	0	0	1	0	1	0
Stevenage	2022–23	League Two	0	0	0	0	0	0	0	0	0	0
Stevenage	Total		0	0	0	0	0	0	2	0	2	0
St Albans City (loan)	2022–23	National League South	4	0	0	0	—		1	0	5	0
Royston Town (loan)	2022–23	Southern League Premier Division Central	12	0	—		—		0	0	12	0
Royston Town	2023–24	Southern League Premier Division Central	10	0	0	0	—		2 (Note: One appearance in Herts Charity Cup; one appearance in Herts Senior Cup)	0	12	0
Royston Town	Total		22	0	0	0	0	0	2	0	24	0
Ware	2024–25	Southern League Division One Central	29	0	1	0	—		1 (Note: Appearance(s) in FA Trophy)	0	31	0
Wingate & Finchley	2025–26	Isthmian League Premier Division	0	0	0	0	—		0	0	0	0
Career total			55	0	1	0	0	0	6	0	62	0

=== International ===
Appearances and goals by national team and year
National team	Season	Apps	Goals
Montserrat	2024	3	0
Montserrat	2025	2	0
Total		5	0
