= Luther James-Wildin =

Association football player

Personal information
- Full name: Luther Ash James-Wildin
- Date of birth: 3 December 1997 (age 28)
- Place of birth: Leicester, England
- Height: 5 ft 10 in (1.78 m)
- Position: Right-back

Team information
- Current team: Stevenage
- Number: 2

Youth career
- 2005–2014: Highfield Rangers
- 2014–2016: Notts County

Senior career*
Years	Team	Apps	(Gls)
2016–2017	Notts County	0	(0)
2016–2017	→ Grantham Town (loan)	35	(2)
2017–2018	Nuneaton Town	35	(2)
2018–	Stevenage	272	(8)

International career^{‡}
2016	Antigua and Barbuda U20	3	(1)
2018–	Antigua and Barbuda	4	(0)
- * Club domestic league appearances and goals as of 17:46, 6 September 2026 (UTC) ‡ National team caps and goals as of 16:20, 10 July 2025 (UTC)

Luther Ash James-Wildin (born 3 December 1997) is a professional footballer who plays as a right-back for EFL League One club Stevenage. Born in England, he represents the Antigua and Barbuda national team.

James-Wildin joined Notts County's academy in 2014, having previously played for Highfield Rangers in Leicester. He signed his first professional contract with Notts County in May 2016, and spent the 2016–17 season on loan at non-League Northern Premier League club Grantham Town. He was released by Notts County at the end of the season and subsequently joined Nuneaton Town of the National League North in July 2017, where he spent one season. James-Wildin joined Stevenage for an undisclosed fee in May 2018 and helped the club earn promotion to League One during the 2022–23 season.

== Early life ==
Born in Leicester, England, James-Wildin is of English and Antiguan heritage. He began playing football competitively at the age of seven with Sunday league youth team Highfield Rangers. James-Wildin stated he was part of a "very successful young side" at Highfield Rangers that remained together for nearly ten years. At the age of 14, he sought to play at a higher standard, having recognised that he was performing at a high level when playing for Highfield Rangers. Prior to playing professional football, he was in an orchestra and also performed in a jazz band, playing the trumpet to a Grade 8 level.

== Club career ==
=== Notts County ===
James-Wildin was offered trials at Nottingham Forest and Aston Villa, which were ultimately unsuccessful. He was scouted by Notts County whilst playing in an under-16 match in 2014. Following a successful one-week trial, he signed a two-year scholarship to join the club's academy. Despite not having made a first-team appearance, James-Wildin signed his first professional contract at Notts County in May 2016.

A month into the 2016–17 season, on 19 September 2016, James-Wildin joined Grantham Town of the Northern Premier League on an initial one-month loan agreement in order to gain first-team experience. The loan was subsequently extended until the end of the season. He made his debut for Grantham in a 4–0 victory over Stratford Town in the FA Trophy on 1 November 2016, coming on as a 77th-minute substitute in the match. He established himself as a first-team regular thereafter, scoring his first goal for the club when he gave Grantham the lead in an eventual 2–1 away victory over Coalville Town on 11 April 2017. James-Wildin made 42 appearances in all competitions during the loan spell, scoring twice.

=== Nuneaton Town ===
Whilst still on loan at Grantham Town, James-Wildin was informed that his one-year contract at Notts County would not be renewed, and he subsequently left the club at the end of the 2016–17 season. He signed for National League North club Nuneaton Town on 14 July 2017, joining the club alongside his brother, Courtney Wildin. He made his debut for Nuneaton in their 1–0 victory over Kidderminster Harriers on 8 August 2017. Whilst contracted to Nuneaton, James-Wildin became the first player to be signed up to Jamie Vardy's V9 Academy on 14 February 2018, a week-long programme held at the end of the season to help non-League footballers in progressing to the Football League. He scored his first goal for Nuneaton on 27 February 2018, his second-half strike proving decisive in a 2–1 away win against AFC Telford United. James-Wildin made 38 appearances during the season, scoring twice.

=== Stevenage ===
James-Wildin signed for League Two club Stevenage for an undisclosed fee on 16 May 2018. The transfer reunited James-Wildin with Stevenage manager Dino Maamria, who had previously managed him at Nuneaton. He made his Stevenage debut in the club's opening match of the 2018–19 season, a 2–2 draw against Tranmere Rovers at Broadhall Way. James-Wildin scored his first Stevenage goal in the club's 2–1 defeat away to Newport County on 13 October 2018. He was the club's first-choice right-back throughout the season, making 41 appearances in all competitions as Stevenage finished 10th in League Two, one point outside the play-off places.

Remaining at Stevenage for the 2019–20 season, James-Wildin scored with a shot from 30 yards (27 m) in Stevenage's 2–2 draw against Macclesfield Town on 31 August 2019. The goal won the EFL League Two Goal of the Month award. He made 29 appearances during the season, which was curtailed due to the COVID-19 pandemic in March 2020. He played 43 times during the 2020–21 season, scoring twice, with Stevenage finishing 14th place in League Two. James-Wildin signed a contract extension with Stevenage on 26 June 2021, and made 49 appearances during the 2021–22 season. He played 46 times under manager Steve Evans during the 2022–23 season, as Stevenage earned promotion to League One after finishing second in League Two. His first goal for two years helped clinch promotion in the club's 2–0 home victory against Grimsby Town on 29 April 2023. Out of contract at the end of the 2022–23 season, James-Wildin signed a further contract extension with Stevenage on 13 June 2023. Although initially undisclosed, Stevenage chairman Phil Wallace later confirmed the new contract was for two years.

James-Wildin signed a "new, improved and extended" contract with Stevenage on 11 April 2025. The following day, he made his 231st league appearance for the club, thereby becoming Stevenage's all-time English Football League appearance record holder.

== International career ==
James-Wildin qualified to represent Antigua and Barbuda through his ancestry. He was offered the opportunity to play for the national team after the Antigua and Barbuda Football Association (ABFA) asked his brother, Courtney, whether he had any brothers eligible to represent the country. A month later, James-Wildin was called up to represent the Antigua and Barbuda under-20 team for the 2016 CFU under-20 Tournament. He scored one goal and provided two assists in his three appearances.

In March 2018, he received a call-up to the Antigua and Barbuda senior team for a pair of friendlies against Bermuda and Jamaica. He made his senior international debut in a 3–2 home victory over Bermuda on 21 March 2018, entering the match as a substitute in the 72nd minute.

== Style of play ==
James-Wildin has predominantly been deployed as a right-back and right wing-back throughout his career. Initially utilised as a central midfielder during the early stages of his time at Grantham Town, he transitioned to right-back upon joining Nuneaton Town. He has been described as possessing "athleticism, pace, power and technique" and has also been commended for his temperament in matches. James-Wildin has stated he considers his defensive strengths to be one-versus-one defending and preventing crosses early, whilst his attacking strengths include providing overlapping runs.

== Career statistics ==
=== Club ===
As of match played 5 September 2026

Appearances and goals by club, season and competition
Club	Season	League			FA Cup		League Cup		Other		Total	
Club	Season	Division	Apps	Goals	Apps	Goals	Apps	Goals	Apps	Goals	Apps	Goals
Notts County	2016–17	League Two	0	0	0	0	0	0	0	0	0	0
Grantham Town (loan)	2016–17	NPL Premier Division	35	2	0	0	—		7 (Note: Two appearances in FA Trophy; five appearances in League Challenge Cup)	0	42	2
Nuneaton Town	2017–18	National League North	35	2	2	0	—		1 (Note: Appearance in FA Trophy)	0	38	2
Stevenage	2018–19	League Two	39	1	1	0	1	0	0	0	41	1
Stevenage	2019–20	League Two	21	1	0	0	1	0	1 (Note: Appearance(s) in EFL Trophy)	0	23	1
Stevenage	2020–21	League Two	39	2	2	0	1	0	1	0	43	2
Stevenage	2021–22	League Two	40	0	3	0	2	0	4	0	49	0
Stevenage	2022–23	League Two	36	1	4	0	3	0	3	0	46	1
Stevenage	2023–24	League One	31	2	3	0	1	0	2	0	37	2
Stevenage	2024–25	League One	29	0	1	0	0	0	3	0	33	0
Stevenage	2025–26	League One	33	1	0	0	0	0	1 (Note: Appearance in 2026 League One play-offs)	0	34	1
Stevenage	2026–27	League One	4	0	0	0	1	0	0	0	5	0
Stevenage	Total		272	8	14	0	10	0	15	0	311	8
Career total			342	12	16	0	10	0	23	0	391	12

=== International ===
Appearances and goals by national team and year
National team	Season	Apps	Goals
Antigua and Barbuda	2018	2	0
Antigua and Barbuda	2025	2	0
Total		4	0

== Honours ==
Stevenage

- EFL League Two runner-up: 2022–23
