= Will Appleyard =

English association football player

Personal information
- Full name: William Hugh Appleyard
- Date of birth: 26 December 1999 (age 26)
- Place of birth: Crewe, England
- Position: Goalkeeper

Team information
- Current team: Warrington Rylands 1906

Youth career
- 2008–2018: Crewe Alexandra

Senior career*
Years	Team	Apps	(Gls)
2018–2019	Stevenage	0	(0)
2018	→ Royston Town (loan)	4	(0)
2019	→ Bedford Town (loan)	0	(0)
2019–2020	FC Halifax Town	0	(0)
2020–	Tadcaster Albion	5	(0)
2022–	Warrington Rylands 1906		
- * Club domestic league appearances and goals as of 13 April 2019 (UTC)

William Hugh Appleyard (born 26 December 1999) is an English footballer who plays as a goalkeeper for Northern Premier League Division One North West club Warrington Rylands 1906. He peaked at a 49 rating on fifa 19 at the age of 18.

== Career ==
=== Stevenage ===
Appleyard began his career with hometown club Crewe Alexandra at the age of eight, signing a two-year scholarship with Crewe, aged 16. He then joined Stevenage on a "developmental contract" on 24 July 2018. Ahead of the 2018–19 season, on 7 August 2018, Appleyard was sent on a 28-day loan deal to Southern League Premier Division Central club Royston Town in order to gain first-team experience. He made his Royston debut in the club's opening game of the campaign, a 0–0 draw with Alvechurch on 11 August 2018. Appleyard went on to make four first-team appearances during his time with the club before returning to Stevenage upon the conclusion of the loan agreement.

On his return to Stevenage, he made his first-team debut in an 8–0 EFL Trophy group stage defeat to Charlton Athletic on 9 October 2018. Appleyard joined Southern League Division One Central club Bedford Town on loan for the remainder of the season on 29 March 2019. He did not make any appearances during the loan spell. Appleyard was released by Stevenage in May 2019.

=== FC Halifax Town ===
Following his departure from Stevenage, Appleyard signed for National League club FC Halifax Town on 8 July 2019. He spent the 2019–20 season at Halifax as their second-choice goalkeeper and did not make any first-team appearances for the club. Appleyard was included in Halifax's list of released players on 27 August 2020.

=== Tadcaster Albion ===
Appleyard joined Northern Premier League Division One North West club Tadcaster Albion on 3 October 2020. He made his debut on the same day, deputising for the injured Michael Ingham in the club's 1–1 draw with Mossley in the FA Cup. Tadcaster won the tie 4–3 on a penalty shootout, during which Appleyard saved a penalty. He went on to play seven times during the month before the Northern Premier League season was curtailed due to restrictions associated with the COVID-19 pandemic.

=== Warrington Rylands 1906 ===
In January 2022 he signed for Warrington Rylands 1906.

== Career statistics ==
As of match played 31 October 2020

Appearances and goals by club, season and competition
Club	Season	League			FA Cup		League Cup		Other		Total	
Club	Season	Division	Apps	Goals	Apps	Goals	Apps	Goals	Apps	Goals	Apps	Goals
Stevenage	2018–19	League Two	0	0	0	0	0	0	1 (Note: Appearance in EFL Trophy)	0	1	0
Royston Town (loan)	2018–19	SFL Premier Division Central	4	0	0	0	—		0	0	4	0
Bedford Town (loan)	2018–19	SFL Division One Central	0	0	—		—		0	0	0	0
FC Halifax Town	2019–20	National League	0	0	0	0	—		0	0	0	0
Tadcaster Albion	2020–21	NPL Division One North West	5	0	2	0	—		0	0	7	0
Career total			9	0	2	0	0	0	1	0	12	0
