= Sacha Bastien =

French association football player (born 1995)

Personal information
- Full name: Sacha Charles Julian Guy Bastien
- Date of birth: 22 January 1995 (age 31)
- Place of birth: Metz, France
- Height: 1.96 m (6 ft 5 in)
- Position: Goalkeeper

Senior career*
Years	Team	Apps	(Gls)
2012–2013	Sedan II	15	(0)
2013–2014	Reims II	6	(0)
2014–2015	Reims	1	(0)
2017–2018	Bastia-Borgo	3	(0)
2017–2018	Bastia-Borgo II	3	(0)
2018–2019	US Granville	10	(0)
2019–2020	Stevenage	1	(0)
2021	Gillingham	0	(0)
2021–2022	Stevenage	1	(0)
- * Club domestic league appearances and goals as of 15:53, 28 August 2021 (UTC)

Sacha Charles Julian Guy Bastien (born 22 January 1995) is a former French professional footballer who played as a goalkeeper.

Bastien started his career playing in the French Championnat National 3 for the respective reserve teams of CS Sedan Ardennes and Stade de Reims. He made his first-team debut for Reims in Ligue 1 in September 2014. He subsequently joined Bastia-Borgo at the start of the 2017–18 season, spending one year there before signing for US Granville of the Championnat National 2. Bastien signed for English League Two club Stevenage in August 2019 and spent the 2019–20 season there. He joined Gillingham of League One in January 2021 on a short-term contract, where he spent the remainder of the 2020–21 season. He returned to Stevenage in August 2021 and spent the 2021–22 season there.

== Club career ==
=== France ===
Bastien began his career playing for the CS Sedan Ardennes reserve team in the Championnat National 3. He made his debut, aged 17, in a 1–1 draw with Grande Synthe on 25 August 2012. He made 15 appearances for the club's reserves during the 2012–13 season. The following season, Bastien joined Stade de Reims on 5 September 2013, and he spent his first year there playing for Reims' reserve team. He started for the first team in their Ligue 1 match against his hometown club FC Metz on 27 September 2014. Bastien picked up a thigh strain in the match and was subsequently replaced by Cyriak Garel in the 22nd-minute of the match.

Ahead of the 2017–18 season, Bastien signed for Bastia-Borgo of the Championnat National 2. He made three first-team appearances during the season, as well as making three further appearances for the Bastia-Borgo II team. The following season, Bastien joined US Granville, also competing in the Championnat National 2, and made 10 appearances for the club's first team during the season.

=== Stevenage ===
Bastien joined League Two club Stevenage on a free transfer on 2 August 2019. He made his Stevenage debut in the club's 3–0 EFL Trophy defeat to Milton Keynes Dons at Broadhall Way on 3 September 2019. Bastien signed a contract extension to remain at Stevenage for the rest of the season on 20 January 2020. He was released by the club in June 2020 having made four appearances.

=== Gillingham ===
Having been without a club since leaving Stevenage, Bastien went on trial at League One club Gillingham at the end of 2020. He trained with the club for "many weeks", playing in a number of the club's behind closed doors training matches. Gillingham manager Steve Evans stated he had always planned on offering Bastien a full-time contract following the trial, but was waiting for confirmation of Joe Walsh's departure to Queens Park Rangers. Bastien subsequently signed a contract for the remainder of the 2020–21 season on 29 January 2021. He was released by Gillingham upon the expiry of his contract, having made no first-team appearances.

=== Return to Stevenage ===
Ahead of the 2021–22 season, Bastien returned to former club Stevenage on trial. He subsequently signed for the club on 2 August 2021. He made two appearances during the season, before being released upon the expiry of his contract in July 2022.

== Career statistics ==
As of match played 31 August 2021

Club	Season	League			FA Cup		League Cup		Other		Total	
Club	Season	Division	Apps	Goals	Apps	Goals	Apps	Goals	Apps	Goals	Apps	Goals
Sedan II	2012–13	Championnat National 3	15	0	0	0	0	0	0	0	15	0
Reims II	2013–14	Championnat National 3	6	0	0	0	0	0	0	0	6	0
Reims	2013–14	Ligue 1	0	0	0	0	0	0	0	0	0	0
Reims	2014–15	Ligue 1	1	0	0	0	0	0	0	0	1	0
Reims	Total		1	0	0	0	0	0	0	0	1	0
Bastia-Borgo	2017–18	Championnat National 3	3	0	0	0	0	0	0	0	3	0
Bastia-Borgo II	2017–18	Championnat National 2	3	0	0	0	0	0	0	0	3	0
US Granville	2018–19	Championnat National 2	10	0	0	0	0	0	0	0	10	0
Stevenage	2019–20	League Two	1	0	0	0	0	0	3 (Note: Appearance(s) in EFL Trophy)	0	4	0
Gillingham	2020–21	League One	0	0	0	0	0	0	0	0	0	0
Stevenage	2021–22	League Two	1	0	0	0	0	0	1	0	2	0
Career total			40	0	0	0	0	0	4	0	44	0
