= Luke Prosser =

English footballer (born 1988)

Personal information
- Full name: Luke Barrie Prosser
- Date of birth: 28 May 1988 (age 38)
- Place of birth: Enfield, London, England
- Height: 6 ft 3 in (1.91 m)
- Position: Defender

Youth career
- 1998–2004: Tottenham Hotspur
- 2004–2006: Port Vale

Senior career*
| Years | Team | Apps | (Gls) |
| 2006–2010 | Port Vale | 33 | (1) |
| 2008 | → Leigh RMI (loan) | 7 | (0) |
| 2009 | → Salisbury City (loan) | 10 | (0) |
| 2010 | → Kidderminster Harriers (loan) | 9 | (0) |
| 2010–2016 | Southend United | 131 | (7) |
| 2011 | → Rushden & Diamonds (loan) | 6 | (1) |
| 2016 | → Northampton Town (loan) | 8 | (0) |
| 2016–2020 | Colchester United | 103 | (6) |
| 2020–2022 | Stevenage | 57 | (2) |
| Total | | 364 | (17) |
- * Club domestic league appearances and goals

Luke Barrie Prosser (born 28 May 1988) is an English former professional footballer last played as a defender. He scored 17 goals in 426 league and cup appearances in a 15-year career.

A product of the Tottenham Hotspur youth academy, Prosser joined Port Vale in 2005. He spent five years at the club, also spending time on loan at Leigh RMI, Salisbury City, and Kidderminster Harriers. He moved on to Southend United in 2010, and was initially loaned out to Rushden & Diamonds. He played for Southend in the 2013 Football League Trophy final and was an unused substitute in the 2015 League Two play-off final victory. He was loaned out to Northampton Town in January 2016, and helped the club to win promotion as League Two champions in 2015–16. After being released by Southend, he joined Essex rivals Colchester United for a four-year stay starting in June 2016. He signed for Stevenage in August 2020 and stayed with the club for two seasons.

== Career ==
=== Port Vale ===
Prosser joined Tottenham Hotspur at the age of ten after being scouted playing in a soccer school run by Micky Hazard. He was signed by Port Vale after he was not offered a Youth Training Scheme contract at White Hart Lane in 2004. He played in the Vale youth setup as a trainee before signing a professional contract on 1 July 2006. Vale offered him a new six-month contract in May 2007. Prosser was loaned to Leigh RMI of the Northern Premier League Premier Division in 2008 to gain first-team experience, where he made seven league appearances. After returning from this loan spell, he made his debut for Port Vale in a 3–2 victory over Brighton & Hove Albion on 5 April 2008. He finished the 2007–08 season with five appearances for the club, after which he was offered a new contract.

Following an injury to Gareth Owen in March 2009, Prosser was allowed to affirm his place in the team and hoped to earn a new contract at the end of the 2008–09 season. He succeeded in this aim, signing a 12-month deal in June 2009. However, two months later he was transfer listed by new manager Micky Adams in August 2009 along with five other young players, having failed to impress in pre-season. He swiftly joined Conference Premier club Salisbury City on a one-month loan deal along with teammate Danny Glover. The pair made their debuts as substitutes in a 1–0 defeat to Mansfield Town at the Raymond McEnhill Stadium on 15 August 2009. After playing six games for Salisbury, Prosser's loan was extended for a further month on 8 September 2009. Adams recalled him in October 2009, though he had to settle for a place on the bench, behind the first choice centre-halves. Another injury to Gareth Owen allowed Prosser to return to the first XI for a league clash with Rotherham United on 14 November 2009. In an eventful first half, Prosser scored his first professional goal with a close ranger header, before being sent off for two bookable offences. In March 2010, he was informed that he would not be offered a new contract by Port Vale at the end of the season. He immediately joined Conference Premier club Kidderminster Harriers on loan until the end of the season, where he made nine appearances.

=== Southend United ===
In search of a new club, Prosser spent time on trial with Barnet and Lincoln City ahead of the 2010–11 season. With a transfer embargo in situ, he signed a pre-contract with Southend United following a trial in August 2010. Having played only 13 matches for Southend, Prosser was loaned to Rushden & Diamonds for three months on 7 January 2011. He was recalled from his loan on 18 February 2011, after playing six league games for the Conference club and scoring his second career goal. Back at Southend, Prosser earned a recall against his former club Port Vale on 9 April 2011, where his last-minute goal earned Southend a point. He signed a new one-year deal with the club the following month. Prosser made 27 appearances for Southend in all competitions during the 2011–12 season, as the club narrowly missed out on automatic promotion and failing in the play-offs. With his contract expiring, Southend activated a 12-month extension clause in Prosser's contract in June 2012. The following season, Prosser captained Southend in Chris Barker's absence during a 1–1 draw with Accrington Stanley on 9 February 2013. He featured for the club in the 2–0 Football League Trophy final defeat to Crewe Alexandra at Wembley Stadium on 7 April 2013. In June 2013, Prosser rejected an initial offer of a new contract from Southend. However, a week later, he agreed a new two-year deal with the club.

Prosser made 31 and 33 appearances, respectively, in the two following seasons as Southend twice reached the play-offs, faltering at the semi-final stage during the 2013–14 season but reaching the final in the 2014–15 campaign. During the season, he was knocked unconscious by a free kick from Cambridge United's Ryan Donaldson on 21 March 2015. He was an unused substitute in the play-off final as Southend beat Wycombe Wanderers to earn promotion to League One on 23 May 2015. Northampton Town were keen to sign Prosser ahead of the 2015–16 season, but had a transfer bid rejected in June 2015. Prosser was named in the Football League Team of the Week for his performance in a 1–0 win over former club Port Vale at Roots Hall on 10 October 2015. However, he found himself out of favour at Southend, and on 28 January 2016, he joined Northampton on loan until the end of the season. He helped Northampton to the League Two title as he made eight league appearances. He was not offered a new contract to remain with his parent club, and Southend released him in May 2016.

=== Colchester United ===
Prosser signed a two-year contract with League Two club Colchester United on 21 June 2016. He was named as captain by manager John McGreal ahead of the 2016–17 season. He made his competitive debut for the club in Colchester's 1–1 draw with Hartlepool United at Victoria Park on the opening day of the season. After making 17 appearances for the Colchester United first-team, Prosser was ruled out for the remainder of the 2016–17 season in November 2016 following surgery on his knee.

In July 2017, Prosser underwent a second operation on his knee that would leave him out of action for a further two months. He said that having a baby daughter to focus on helped during his injury layoff. Prosser made his first appearance since 5 November 2016 as a substitute in Colchester's 3–1 defeat at Wycombe Wanderers on 13 January 2018. He was named of the EFL Team of the Week after he helped the "U's" to keep a clean sheet in a 1–0 victory at Stevenage. He scored his first goal for the club in a 2–1 victory over Luton Town on 30 March 2018. McGreal credited him with the team's upturn in form following his return to fitness. After making 16 appearances during the 2017–18 season for Colchester, he signed a new two-year contract with the club. He made 41 appearances during the 2018–19 campaign and was named on the EFL Team of the Week for his performance in a 1–0 win over champions-elect Lincoln City on 27 October 2018.

He played in United's 0–0 draw with, and subsequent penalty shoot-out victory over, Tottenham Hotspur in the EFL Cup on 24 September 2019. They went on to advance to the quarter-finals, where they were beaten 3–0 by Manchester United at Old Trafford. Speaking in January, Prosser said that the club were aiming for automatic promotion. However, Colchester were in sixth-place when the season was suspended due to the COVID-19 pandemic in England, which led Prosser to comment that "there's so much to play for and we're desperate to get back out there with the boys". Chairman Robbie Cowling went on to confirm that Prosser would be offered a new contract by the end of June, admitting that he was one of a number of players that "under normal circumstances I would have been determined to re-sign". He went on to play in both of the club's play-off semi-final games before leaving the club, a 3–2 aggregate defeat to Exeter City.

=== Stevenage ===
Prosser signed with Stevenage on 10 August 2020, who had just been relegated into the National League out of the English Football League, citing the club's proximity to his family home as a major factor in making the move. The next day, Stevenage were reinstated into League Two due to a points deduction for Macclesfield Town. Manager Alex Revell said that Prosser would have "a huge responsibility every day to not only lead the squad with his experience but show the younger players what it takes to be a top professional". He scored on his home league debut at Broadhall Way, a 3–0 win over Oldham Athletic on 19 September 2020. Prosser was sent off in a 4–0 defeat at Carlisle United on 12 December 2020. He made 34 appearances throughout the 2020–21 season as Stevenage finished the campaign in 14th-place in League Two. He featured 32 times in the 2021–22 season and was released in the summer by new manager Steve Evans.

== Personal life ==
Born in Enfield, London, Prosser came from a Tottenham Hotspur supporting family. He has a younger sister, Abbie, who is also a footballer. She has represented England at under-20 level and had been capped 18 times at under-19 level. She played at club level for Arsenal, Barnet, and Doncaster Rovers Belles. He later joked that "It's funny when the chauffeur pulls up and your sister gets in and goes off with England and I'm sitting there thinking: 'Bloody hell, I'm at Port Vale here, where's my life going?'" He married in 2019.

== Career statistics ==
Appearances and goals by club, season and competition
| Club | Season | League | | | FA Cup | | League Cup | | Other | | Total | |
| Club | Season | Division | Apps | Goals | Apps | Goals | Apps | Goals | Apps | Goals | Apps | Goals |
|---|---|---|---|---|---|---|---|---|---|---|---|---|
| Port Vale | 2005–06 | League One | 0 | 0 | 0 | 0 | 0 | 0 | 0 | 0 | 0 | 0 |
| Port Vale | 2006–07 | League One | 0 | 0 | 0 | 0 | 0 | 0 | 0 | 0 | 0 | 0 |
| Port Vale | 2007–08 | League One | 5 | 0 | 0 | 0 | 0 | 0 | 0 | 0 | 5 | 0 |
| Port Vale | 2008–09 | League Two | 26 | 0 | 1 | 0 | 0 | 0 | 1 (Note: Appearance(s) in Football League Trophy) | 0 | 28 | 0 |
| Port Vale | 2009–10 | League Two | 2 | 1 | 1 | 0 | 0 | 0 | 0 | 0 | 3 | 1 |
| Port Vale | Total | | 33 | 1 | 2 | 0 | 0 | 0 | 1 | 0 | 36 | 1 |
| Leigh RMI (loan) | 2007–08 | NPL Premier Division | 7 | 0 | 0 | 0 | – | | 0 | 0 | 7 | 0 |
| Salisbury City (loan) | 2009–10 | Conference Premier | 10 | 0 | 0 | 0 | – | | 0 | 0 | 10 | 0 |
| Kidderminster Harriers (loan) | 2009–10 | Conference Premier | 9 | 0 | – | | – | | 0 | 0 | 9 | 0 |
| Southend United | 2010–11 | League Two | 17 | 1 | 2 | 0 | 1 | 0 | 1 | 0 | 21 | 1 |
| Southend United | 2011–12 | League Two | 21 | 1 | 1 | 0 | 1 | 0 | 4 (Note: Two appearances in Football League Trophy, two appearances in EFL League Two play-offs) | 0 | 27 | 1 |
| Southend United | 2012–13 | League Two | 25 | 0 | 4 | 0 | 1 | 0 | 6 | 0 | 36 | 0 |
| Southend United | 2013–14 | League Two | 25 | 3 | 4 | 0 | 1 | 0 | 1 | 0 | 31 | 3 |
| Southend United | 2014–15 | League Two | 30 | 0 | 1 | 0 | 1 | 0 | 1 | 0 | 33 | 0 |
| Southend United | 2015–16 | League One | 13 | 2 | 1 | 0 | 1 | 0 | 1 | 0 | 16 | 2 |
| Southend United | Total | | 131 | 7 | 13 | 0 | 6 | 0 | 14 | 0 | 164 | 7 |
| Rushden & Diamonds (loan) | 2010–11 | Conference Premier | 6 | 1 | – | | – | | 1 (Note: Appearance(s) in Northamptonshire Senior Cup) | 0 | 7 | 1 |
| Northampton Town (loan) | 2015–16 | League Two | 8 | 0 | – | | – | | – | | 8 | 0 |
| Colchester United | 2016–17 | League Two | 14 | 0 | 1 | 0 | 1 | 0 | 1 (Note: Appearance(s) in EFL Trophy) | 0 | 17 | 0 |
| Colchester United | 2017–18 | League Two | 16 | 1 | 0 | 0 | 0 | 0 | 0 | 0 | 16 | 1 |
| Colchester United | 2018–19 | League Two | 38 | 2 | 1 | 0 | 0 | 0 | 2 | 0 | 41 | 2 |
| Colchester United | 2019–20 | League Two | 35 | 3 | 1 | 0 | 5 | 0 | 4 (Note: Two appearances in EFL Trophy, two appearances in EFL League Two play-offs) | 0 | 45 | 3 |
| Colchester United | Total | | 103 | 6 | 3 | 0 | 6 | 0 | 7 | 0 | 119 | 6 |
| Stevenage | 2020–21 | League Two | 30 | 1 | 2 | 0 | 1 | 0 | 1 | 0 | 34 | 1 |
| Stevenage | 2021–22 | League Two | 27 | 1 | 2 | 0 | 1 | 0 | 2 | 0 | 32 | 1 |
| Stevenage | Total | | 57 | 2 | 4 | 0 | 2 | 0 | 3 | 0 | 66 | 2 |
| Career total | | | 364 | 17 | 22 | 0 | 14 | 0 | 26 | 0 | 426 | 17 |

== Honours ==
Southend United

- Football League Trophy runner-up: 2012–13
- Football League Two play-offs: 2015

Northampton Town

- Football League Two: 2015–16

Sporting positions
| Preceded by Owen Garvan | Colchester United captain 2016–2020 | Succeeded by Harry Pell |
