= 2021–22 Stevenage F.C. season =

Stevenage
2021–22 season
- Chairman: Phil Wallace
- Manager: Alex Revell (until 15 November); Paul Tisdale (between 28 November – 16 March); Steve Evans (from 16 March)
- Stadium: Broadhall Way
- League Two: 21st
- FA Cup: Second round
- EFL Cup: Second round
- EFL Trophy: Second round
- Top goalscorer: League: Elliott List (8); All: Elliott List (12)
| Home colours | Away colours | Third colours |

The 2021–22 season was Stevenage's eighth consecutive season in League Two and their 46th year in existence. Along with competing in League Two, the club are also participating in the FA Cup, the EFL Cup and the EFL Trophy. The season covers the period from 1 July 2021 to 30 June 2022. Manager Alex Revell left the club on 15 November 2021 with the club having won three of their opening 16 league matches. Academy manager Robbie O’Keefe was named as caretaker manager while the club looked for a replacement. Paul Tisdale was appointed as manager on 28 November 2021. Stevenage and Tisdale parted ways on 16 March 2022, with Steve Evans taking charge as manager.

== Pre-season friendlies ==
Stevenage announced they would play pre-season friendlies against Hitchin Town, St Albans City, Wycombe Wanderers, Ipswich Town, Crystal Palace under-23s, Watford and Dover Athletic as part of their pre-season preparations.

| 10 July 2021 Friendly | Hitchin Town | 0–1 | Stevenage | Hitchin |
| 15:00 BST | | Report | Draper 34' | Stadium: Top Field; Attendance: 761 |

| 14 July 2021 Friendly | St Albans City | 0–1 | Stevenage | St Albans |
| 19:30 BST | | Report | Draper 60' | Stadium: Clarence Park |

| 17 July 2021 Friendly | Wycombe Wanderers | 1–0 | Stevenage | Marlow |
| 15:00 BST | Kashket 43' | Report | | Stadium: Marlow Road Training Ground; Attendance: 0 (Behind-closed-doors) |

| 20 July 2021 Friendly | Stevenage | Cancelled | Ipswich Town | Needham Market |
| TBC BST | | | | Stadium: Bloomfields |
Note: Match was cancelled due to circumstances beyond the clubs control.

| 23 July 2021 Friendly | Stevenage | 1–0 | Crystal Palace U23 | Stevenage |
| 19:00 BST | 76' (o.g.) | Report | | Stadium: Lamex Stadium |

| 27 July 2021 Friendly | Stevenage | 1–1 | Watford | Stevenage |
| 19:45 BST | Reid 2' | Report | Sema 37' | Stadium: Lamex Stadium |

| 31 July 2021 Friendly | Dover Athletic | 0–2 | Stevenage | River |
| 12:00 BST | | Report | Reid 9'; Lines 59' | Stadium: Crabble Stadium |

== Competitions ==
=== League Two ===
==== League table ====
| Pos | Team | Pld | W | D | L | GF | GA | GD | Pts | Promotion, qualification or relegation |
|---|---|---|---|---|---|---|---|---|---|---|
| 18 | Rochdale | 46 | 12 | 17 | 17 | 51 | 59 | −8 | 53 | |
| 19 | Harrogate Town | 46 | 14 | 11 | 21 | 64 | 75 | −11 | 53 | |
| 20 | Carlisle United | 46 | 14 | 11 | 21 | 39 | 62 | −23 | 53 | |
| 21 | Stevenage | 46 | 11 | 14 | 21 | 45 | 68 | −23 | 47 | |
| 22 | Barrow | 46 | 10 | 14 | 22 | 44 | 57 | −13 | 44 | |
| 23 | Oldham Athletic (R) | 46 | 9 | 11 | 26 | 46 | 75 | −29 | 38 | Relegation to National League |
| 24 | Scunthorpe United (R) | 46 | 4 | 14 | 28 | 29 | 90 | −61 | 26 | Relegation to National League |

Source: EFL Official Website
Rules for classification: 1) Points; 2) Goal difference; 3) Number of goals scored; 4) Head-to-head results; 5) Wins; 6) Away goals; 7) Penalty points (sec 9.5); 8) 12-point sending off offences
(R) Relegated

==== Results summary ====
| Overall | | | | | | | | Home | | | | | | Away | | | | | |
| Pld | W | D | L | GF | GA | GD | Pts | W | D | L | GF | GA | GD | W | D | L | GF | GA | GD |
|---|---|---|---|---|---|---|---|---|---|---|---|---|---|---|---|---|---|---|---|
| 46 | 11 | 14 | 21 | 45 | 68 | −23 | 47 | 9 | 6 | 8 | 29 | 30 | −1 | 2 | 8 | 13 | 16 | 38 | −22 |

Last updated: 7 May 2022.

==== Results by matchday ====
| Matchday | 1 | 2 | 3 | 4 | 5 | 6 | 7 | 8 | 9 | 10 | 11 | 12 | 13 | 14 | 15 | 16 | 17 | 18 | 19 | 20 | 21 | 22 | 23 | 24 | 25 | 26 | 27 | 28 | 29 | 30 | 31 | 32 | 33 | 34 | 35 | 36 | 37 | 38 | 39 | 40 | 41 | 42 | 43 | 44 | 45 | 46 |
|---|---|---|---|---|---|---|---|---|---|---|---|---|---|---|---|---|---|---|---|---|---|---|---|---|---|---|---|---|---|---|---|---|---|---|---|---|---|---|---|---|---|---|---|---|---|---|
| Ground | H | A | A | H | A | H | A | H | A | H | H | A | A | H | A | H | H | A | H | H | A | A | A | H | H | H | A | H | A | A | H | A | H | A | A | H | H | A | H | A | H | A | H | A | A | H |
| Result | W | W | L | D | L | D | L | L | D | W | D | L | L | D | L | L | W | D | D | L | L | D | L | W | D | W | D | W | L | D | L | D | L | L | D | L | L | L | L | W | W | D | W | L | L | W |
| Position | 8 | 2 | 5 | 5 | 9 | 12 | 18 | 21 | 21 | 17 | 15 | 20 | 20 | 20 | 21 | 21 | 21 | 21 | 21 | 22 | 22 | 21 | 22 | 21 | 21 | 20 | 19 | 17 | 17 | 16 | 17 | 17 | 19 | 19 | 21 | 22 | 22 | 22 | 23 | 23 | 22 | 22 | 22 | 22 | 22 | 21 |

Updated to match(es) played on 7 May 2022. Source: Statto.com
A = Away; H = Home; W = Win; D = Draw; L = Loss

==== Matches ====
Stevenage's league fixtures were revealed on 24 June 2021.

| 7 August 2021 1 | Stevenage | 1–0 | Barrow | Stevenage |
| 15:00 BST | Lines (yellow card) 45+1'; Reeves 46'; Cuthbert (yellow card) 52'; Vancooten (yellow card) 55'; Taylor (yellow card) 90' | Report | Taylor (yellow card) 21'; Banks (yellow card) 22'; Platt (yellow card) 45+2'; Kay (yellow card) 51'; Ntlhe (yellow card) 68'; Devitt (yellow card) 79' | Stadium: Lamex Stadium; Attendance: 2,536; Referee: James Oldham |

| 14 August 2021 2 | Bristol Rovers | 0–2 | Stevenage | Horfield |
| 15:00 BST | Harries (yellow card) 50' | Report | Vancooten (yellow card) 52'; Lines 88'; Norris 90+6' | Stadium: Memorial Stadium; Attendance: 7,071; Referee: Neil Hair |

| 17 August 2021 3 | Bradford | 4–1 | Stevenage | Bradford |
| 19:45 BST | Cook 1'; Cousin-Dawson (yellow card) 13'; Angol (penalty missed); Cook 30'; Cook 38'; Cavanan 88' | Report | List 17' | Stadium: Valley Parade; Attendance: 14,257; Referee: Martin Coy |

| 21 August 2021 4 | Stevenage | 1–1 | Port Vale | Stevenage |
| 15:00 BST | Norris 33' | Report | Smith (yellow card) 13'; Rodney 20'; Wilson (yellow card) 30'; Walker (yellow card) 52' | Stadium: Lamex Stadium; Attendance: 2,727; Referee: Sam Purkiss |

| 28 August 2021 5 | Walsall | 1–0 | Stevenage | Bescot |
| 15:00 BST | Wilkinson 5'; Labadie (yellow card) 63' | Report | Vancooten (yellow card) 84' | Stadium: Banks's Stadium; Attendance: 4,257; Referee: Andrew Kitchen |

| 4 September 2021 6 | Stevenage | 1–1 | Swindon Town | Stevenage |
| 15:00 BST | Coker 54' | Report | Payne 90+5' (pen.) | Stadium: Lamex Stadium; Attendance: 3,589; Referee: John Brooks |

| 11 September 2021 7 | Sutton United | 2–1 | Stevenage | Sutton |
| 15:00 BST | John (yellow card) 38'; Bennett 58', 63' (pen.); Kizzi (yellow card) 89' | Report | Taylor (yellow card) 47'; List 55'; Vancooten (red card) 61'; Coker (yellow card) 90+4' | Stadium: VBS Community Stadium; Attendance: 2,427; Referee: Trevor Kettle |

| 18 September 2021 8 | Stevenage | 0–4 | Forest Green Rovers | Stevenage |
| 15:00 BST | Reeves (yellow card) 53'; Coker (yellow card) 59' | Report | Wilson 2'; Sweeney (yellow card) 43'; Hendry (yellow card) 45+1'; Stevens 50'; McGee (yellow card) 54'; Matt 58'; Stevenson (yellow card) 71'; Young 81' | Stadium: Lamex Stadium; Attendance: 3,111; Referee: Sam Allison |

| 25 September 2021 9 | Harrogate Town | 0–0 | Stevenage | Harrogate |
| 15:00 BST | Hall (yellow card) 64' | Report | Cuthbert (yellow card) 64'; Reeves (yellow card) 69'; James-Wildin (yellow card) 72' | Stadium: EnviroVent Stadium; Attendance: 1,667; Referee: Carl Boyeson |

| 2 October 2021 10 | Stevenage | 2–0 | Hartlepool United | Stevenage |
| 15:00 BST | Reid 21'; Taylor (yellow card) 44'; List 46'; Vancooten (yellow card) 58' | Report | | Stadium: Lamex Stadium; Attendance: 2,633; Referee: Ben Speedie |

| 9 October 2021 11 | Stevenage | 2–2 | Exeter City | Stevenage |
| 15:00 BST | List 23', 59'; Taylor (yellow card) 57'; Cuthbert (yellow card) 66' | Report | Nombe 10'; Sweeney (yellow card) 29'; Hartridge (yellow card) 44'; Ray (yellow card) 47'; Jay 50'; Atangana (yellow card) 84' | Stadium: Lamex Stadium; Attendance: 3,186; Referee: Christopher Pollard |

| 16 October 2021 12 | Oldham Athletic | 3–0 | Stevenage | Oldham |
| 15:00 BST | Keillor-Dunn 6', 17'; Bowden (yellow card) 38'; Bahamboula 58'; Piergianni (yellow card) 90+1' | Report | | Stadium: Boundary Park; Attendance: 3,492; Referee: Bobby Madley |

| 19 October 2021 13 | Northampton Town | 3–0 | Stevenage | Northampton |
| 19:45 BST | Etete 34'; Hoskins 43'; Horsfall 63'; Lewis (yellow card) 88' | Report | Reeves (yellow card) 12'; Vancooten (yellow card) 54'; Reid (yellow card) 56'; Coker (yellow card) 73' | Stadium: PTS Academy Stadium; Attendance: 4,123; Referee: Sam Barrott |

| 24 October 2021 14 | Stevenage | 0–0 | Leyton Orient | Stevenage |
| 15:00 BST | | Report | Archibald (yellow card) 32' | Stadium: Lamex Stadium; Attendance: 3,544; Referee: James Bell |

| 30 October 2021 15 | Newport County | 5–0 | Stevenage | Newport |
| 15:00 GMT | Telford 12', 28', 48'; Baker-Richardson 34'; Azaz 50' | Report | | Stadium: Rodney Parade; Attendance: 3,439; Referee: Will Finnie |

| 13 November 2021 16 | Stevenage | 1–2 | Mansfield Town | Stevenage |
| 15:00 GMT | Cuthbert 55'; Vancooten (yellow card) 85'; Norris (yellow card) 90+1' | Report | Hawkins (yellow card) 12'; O'Toole 19', (yellow card) 90+7'; Stirk 65', (yellow card) 90+4' | Stadium: Lamex Stadium; Attendance: 2,946; Referee: Chris Sarginson |

| 20 November 2021 17 | Stevenage | 1–0 | Colchester United | Stevenage |
| 15:00 GMT | Coker (yellow card) 25'; List 45+3' (pen.); James-Wildin (yellow card) 89' | Report | Dobra (yellow card) 38'; George (yellow card) 45+2'; Tchamadeu (yellow card) 59'; Jasper (yellow card) 83' | Stadium: Lamex Stadium; Attendance: 2,683; Referee: Trevor Kettle |

| 23 November 2021 18 | Rochdale | 2–2 | Stevenage | Spotland |
| 19:45 GMT | Beesley 4'; Andrews 35'; Kelly (yellow card) 90' | Report | List 27', 47'; Melbourne (yellow card) 74'; Read (yellow card) 89'; Cuthbert (yellow card) 90+4' | Stadium: Crown Oil Arena; Referee: Scott Oldham |

| 7 December 2021 19 | Stevenage | 1–1 | Scunthorpe United | Stevenage |
| 19:45 GMT | Norris 6'; Prosser (yellow card) 44' | Report | Hippolyte 14'; Rowe (yellow card) 39'; Pugh (yellow card) 83' | Stadium: Lamex Stadium; Attendance: 1,808; Referee: Brett Huxtable |

| 11 December 2021 20 | Stevenage | 0–2 | Carlisle United | Stevenage |
| 15:00 GMT | James-Wildin (yellow card) 72' | Report | Mellor (yellow card) 7'; Mellish 44'; Gibson 65' (pen.) | Stadium: Lamex Stadium; Attendance: 2,842; Referee: Declan Bourne |

| 18 December 2021 21 | Salford City | 1–0 | Stevenage | Salford |
| 15:00 GMT | Hunter (yellow card) 7'; Turnbull 34' | Report | Prosser (yellow card) 69'; Osborne (yellow card) 90+4' | Stadium: Peninsula Stadium; Attendance: 1,375; Referee: Tom Reeves |

| 29 December 2021 22 | Swindon Town | 0–0 | Stevenage | Swindon |
| 19:45 GMT | Reed (yellow card) 40'; Iandolo (yellow card) 79' | Report | Reeves (yellow card) 75' | Stadium: The Energy Check County Ground; Attendance: 8,131; Referee: John Busby |

| 1 January 2022 23 | Forest Green Rovers | 2–0 | Stevenage | Nailsworth |
| 15:00 GMT | Cadden (yellow card) 19'; March 57'; Matt 64' | Report | Lines (yellow card) 13' | Stadium: The Fully Charged New Lawn; Attendance: 2,454; Referee: Neil Hair |

| 8 January 2022 24 | Stevenage | 3–1 | Walsall | Stevenage |
| 15:00 GMT | Menayese 1' (o.g.); Lines 8'; Cuthbert (yellow card) 35'; Prosser (yellow card) 74'; Taylor 90+4' | Report | Menayese (yellow card) 27'; Kiernan 70'; Wilkinson (yellow card) 76' | Stadium: Lamex Stadium; Attendance: 2,167; Referee: James Oldham |

| 15 January 2022 25 | Stevenage | 3–3 | Sutton United | Stevenage |
| 15:00 GMT | Norris 34'; Reid 39', 64'; Prosser (yellow card) 55' | Report | Smith 58'; Milsom 66' (pen.); Bennett 90+8' | Stadium: Lamex Stadium; Attendance: 2,961; Referee: Paul Howard |

| 18 January 2022 26 | Stevenage | 2–1 | Crawley Town | Stevenage |
| 19:45 GMT | Taylor 29'; Norris 74' | Report | Nichols 45+1'; Tilley (yellow card) 68'; Frost (yellow card) 77' | Stadium: Lamex Stadium; Attendance: 1,942; Referee: Will Finnie |

| 22 January 2022 27 | Hartlepool United | 1–1 | Stevenage | Hartlepool |
| 15:00 GMT | Featherstone 77'; Molyneux (yellow card) 90+2' | Report | Norris 70' (pen.) | Stadium: The Suit Direct Stadium; Referee: Martin Coy |

| 29 January 2022 28 | Stevenage | 3–0 | Harrogate Town | Stevenage |
| 15:00 GMT | Reeves 9'; Norris 21'; Prosser (yellow card) 55'; Taylor 80' | Report | | Stadium: Lamex Stadium; Attendance: 2,935; Referee: Peter Wright |

| 1 February 2022 29 | Tranmere Rovers | 1–0 | Stevenage | Birkenhead |
| 19:45 GMT | Morris 48' | Report | Vancooten (yellow card) 15' | Stadium: Prenton Park; Referee: Anthony Backhouse |

| 5 February 2022 30 | Crawley Town | 2–2 | Stevenage | Crawley |
| 15:00 GMT | Nichols 34', 46'; Tilley (yellow card) 62' | Report | Clements (yellow card) 37'; Read 80'; Cuthbert 90+2' | Stadium: The People's Pension Stadium; Attendance: 2,214; Referee: Robert Lewis |

| 8 February 2022 31 | Stevenage | 0–1 | Bradford City | Stevenage |
| 19:45 GMT | Bostwick (yellow card) 66' | Report | Walker 55'; Hendrie (yellow card) 76'; Watt (yellow card) 78' | Stadium: Lamex Stadium; Attendance: 1,953; Referee: Gavin Ward |

| 12 February 2022 32 | Barrow | 0–0 | Stevenage | Barrow-in-Furness |
| 15:00 GMT | Amadi-Holloway (red card) 55' | Report | Prosser (yellow card) 65' (yellow-red card) 90+7' | Stadium: The Dune Hotel Stadium; Attendance: 3,001; Referee: Darren Handley |

| 19 February 2022 33 | Stevenage | 0–4 | Bristol Rovers | Stevenage |
| 15:00 GMT | Bostwick (yellow card) 25' | Report | Coutts (yellow card) 21'; Finley 36', (yellow card) 67'; E. Anderson 50', (yellow card) 90'; H. Anderson 54'; Collins 74' | Stadium: The Lamex Stadium; Attendance: 3,538; Referee: Andy Woolmer |

| 26 February 2022 34 | Port Vale | 2–0 | Stevenage | Burslem |
| 15:00 GMT | Walker (yellow card) 2'; O'Neill 6' (o.g.); Edmondson 12' | Report | Upson (yellow card) 84' | Stadium: Vale Park; Attendance: 5,157; Referee: Scott Oldham |

| 5 March 2022 35 | Leyton Orient | 2–2 | Stevenage | Leyton |
| 15:00 GMT | Sotiriou 30'; Coleman (yellow card) 85'; Archibald 90+4' | Report | Prosser 24'; Norris 32'; James-Wildin (yellow card) 77' | Stadium: Breyer Group Stadium; Attendance: 4,558; Referee: Darren Drysdale |

| 12 March 2022 36 | Stevenage | 0–2 | Newport County | Stevenage |
| 15:00 GMT | | Report | Street 47'; Haynes 70', (yellow card) 80' | Stadium: Lamex Stadium; Attendance: 2,733; Referee: Ben Toner |

| 15 March 2022 37 | Stevenage | 1–2 | Northampton Town | Stevenage |
| 19:45 GMT | Lines 82' | Report | McGowan 18'; Pinnock 50'; Hoskins (yellow card) 68'; Rose (yellow card) 78' | Stadium: The Lamex Stadium; Attendance: 2,362; Referee: Craig Hicks |

| 26 March 2022 38 | Exeter City | 2–1 | Stevenage | Exeter |
| 15:00 GMT | Stubbs 28', 44'; Key (yellow card) 69'; Sweeney (yellow card) 90' | Report | Cuthbert (yellow card) 18'; Norris 38'; Barry (yellow card) 90+4' | Stadium: St James Park; Attendance: 5,923; Referee: Carl Boyeson |

| 2 April 2022 39 | Stevenage | 0–1 | Oldham Athletic | Stevenage |
| 15:00 BST | James-Wildin (yellow card) 45+2'; Coker (yellow card) 90+4' | Report | Hopcutt 16'; Clarke (yellow card) 49'; Adams (yellow card) 68' | Stadium: The Lamex Stadium; Attendance: 4,642; Referee: Andy Davies |

| 9 April 2022 40 | Colchester United | 0–2 | Stevenage | Colchester |
| 15:00 BST | Sarpong-Wiredu (yellow card) 30'; Eastman (yellow card) 53'; Kenlock (yellow card) 90+3' | Report | Reid 45+6', (yellow card) 57'; Norris 49', (yellow card) 51' (yellow-red card) 84'; Coker (yellow card) 77'; Carter (yellow card) 90+1' | Stadium: JobServe Community Stadium; Attendance: 3,094; Referee: Sam Barrott |

| 15 April 2022 41 | Stevenage | 1–0 | Rochdale | Stevenage |
| 15:00 BST | Cuthbert 48'; Lines (yellow card) 87' | Report | O'Connell (yellow card) 90+1' | Stadium: Lamex Stadium; Attendance: 3,172; Referee: Robert Lewis |

| 18 April 2022 42 | Scunthorpe United | 1–1 | Stevenage | Scunthorpe |
| 15:00 BST | Rowe (yellow card) 12'; Delaney (yellow card) 47'; Bunn 75' | Report | Reid 53' | Stadium: Sands Venue Stadium; Attendance: 2,439; Referee: Seb Stockbridge |

| 23 April 2022 43 | Stevenage | 2–0 | Tranmere Rovers | Stevenage |
| 15:00 BST | Norris 23' (pen.), 67'; Reid (yellow card) 55'; Coker (yellow card) 65' | Report | Spearing (yellow card) 73' | Stadium: Lamex Stadium; Attendance: 2,969; Referee: Keith Stroud |

| 26 April 2022 44 | Mansfield Town | 2–0 | Stevenage | Mansfield |
| 19:45 BST | Perch (yellow card) 15'; Maris (yellow card) 21'; Lapslie 51'; Longstaff 90+3' | Report | Taylor (yellow card) 43'; Andrade (yellow card) 87' | Stadium: One Call Stadium; Attendance: 5,086; Referee: Chris Sarginson |

| 30 April 2022 45 | Carlisle United | 2–1 | Stevenage | Carlisle |
| 15:00 BST | Riley 52'; Alessandra 63' | Report | Taylor (yellow card) 33'; Norris 88' (pen.) | Stadium: Brunton Park; Attendance: 5,701; Referee: Darren Drysdale |

| 7 May 2022 46 | Stevenage | 4–2 | Salford City | Stevenage |
| 15:00 BST | Vassell 23' (o.g.); Reid 43'; Bostwick 49', (yellow card) 90+2'; List 80' | Report | Shephard 14'; Ndaba 67' | Stadium: The Lamex Stadium; Attendance: 3,558; Referee: Martin Coy |

=== FA Cup ===
Stevenage were drawn away to Milton Keynes Dons in the first round and Yeovil Town in the second round.

| 6 November 2021 First round | Milton Keynes Dons | 2–2 | Stevenage | Denbigh |
| 15:00 GMT | Darling 34'; Baldwin (yellow card) 36'; Watters 76' | Report | Taylor (yellow card) 40'; Barry 70'; List 73' | Stadium: Stadium MK; Attendance: 2,860; Referee: Simon Mather |

| 16 November 2021 First round replay | Stevenage | 2–1 (a.e.t.) | Milton Keynes Dons | Stevenage |
| 19:45 GMT | Taylor (yellow card) 51'; Reid 61'; Norris 120+1' (pen.); Smith (yellow card) 120+1' | Report | Darling (yellow card) 5' (yellow-red card) 119', (goal) 37'; Robson (yellow card) 11'; Boateng (yellow card) 34'; Martin (red card) 45+2'; Harvie (yellow card) 75'; Kasumu (yellow card) 112'; Baldwin (yellow card) 117' | Stadium: Lamex Stadium; Attendance: 1,876; Referee: Alan Young |

| 4 December 2021 Second round | Yeovil Town | 1–0 | Stevenage | Yeovil |
| 17:30 GMT | Staunton (yellow card) 31'; Wakefield 51'; Wilkinson (yellow card) 72' | Report | Reeves (yellow card) 10' | Stadium: Huish Park; Attendance: 2,754; Referee: Craig Hicks |

=== EFL Cup ===
Stevenage were drawn at home to Luton Town in the first round and Wycombe Wanderers in the second round.

| 10 August 2021 First round | Stevenage | 2–2 (3–0 p) | Luton Town | Stevenage |
| 19:45 BST | List 2'; Vancooten (yellow card) 4'; Coker 26' | Report | Jerome 5'; Muskwe 40'; Lansbury (yellow card) 44'; Osho (yellow card) 56'; Rea (yellow card) 58' | Stadium: Lamex Stadium; Attendance: 3,052; Referee: Andy Woolmer |
| | Penalties |
| | Lines (penalty scored); James-Wildin (penalty scored); Reeves (penalty scored) | | Cornick (penalty missed); Mendes Gomes (penalty missed); Pereira (penalty missed) |

| 24 August 2021 Second round | Stevenage | 2–2 (4–5 p) | Wycombe Wanderers | Stevenage |
| 19:45 BST | Reeves (yellow card) 46'; List 50'; Reid 77' | Report | Akinfenwa 23'; Jacobson (yellow card) 27'; Pendlebury (yellow card) 34'; Burley (yellow card) 60'; De Barr 90+4' | Stadium: Lamex Stadium; Attendance: 1,934; Referee: Declan Bourne |
| | Penalties |
| | Norris (penalty scored); James-Wildin (penalty missed); Reeves (penalty scored); Coker (penalty scored) | | Jacobson (penalty scored); Horgan (penalty scored); Pendlebury (penalty scored); Mehmeti (penalty scored); De Barr (penalty scored) |

=== EFL Trophy ===
Stevenage were drawn into Southern Group H alongside Cambridge United, Oxford United and Tottenham Hotspur under-21s. Dates for the group stage fixtures were announced on 7 July 2021.

| Pos | Div | Team | Pld | W | PW | PL | L | GF | GA | GD | Pts | Qualification |
|---|---|---|---|---|---|---|---|---|---|---|---|---|
| 1 | L1 | Cambridge United | 3 | 2 | 0 | 0 | 1 | 5 | 2 | +3 | 6 | Advance to Round 2 |
| 2 | L2 | Stevenage | 3 | 2 | 0 | 0 | 1 | 6 | 5 | +1 | 6 | Advance to Round 2 |
| 3 | ACA | Tottenham Hotspur U21 | 3 | 1 | 0 | 0 | 2 | 6 | 7 | −1 | 3 | |
| 4 | L1 | Oxford United | 3 | 1 | 0 | 0 | 2 | 5 | 8 | −3 | 3 | |

Source: EFL.com

| 31 August 2021 Group game 1 | Stevenage | 3–4 | Tottenham Hotspur U21s | Stevenage |
| 19:00 BST | | | | Stadium: The Lamex Stadium |

| 5 October 2021 Group game 2 | Oxford United | 1–2 | Stevenage | Littlemore |
| 19:45 BST | | | | Stadium: Kassam Stadium |

| 9 November 2021 Group game 3 | Stevenage | 1–0 | Cambridge United | Stevenage |
| 19:00 GMT | Vancooten (yellow card) 13'; Reeves (yellow card) 38'; List 40' | Report | Masterson (yellow card) 62'; Weir (yellow card) 90+2' | Stadium: Lamex Stadium; Referee: Charles Breakspear |

| 30 November 2021 Second round | Sutton United | 0–0 (4–3 p) | Stevenage | Sutton |
| 19:45 GMT | Eastmond (yellow card) 90+8' | Report | Lines (yellow card) 33'; Vancooten (yellow card) 38'; Marshall (yellow card) 81' | Stadium: Borough Sports Park; Attendance: 770; Referee: Sam Purkiss |
| | Penalties |
| | Eastmond (penalty scored); Davis (penalty scored); Milsom (penalty scored); Korboa (penalty missed); Olaofe (penalty missed); Goodliffe (penalty scored) | | Norris (penalty scored); Reeves (penalty scored); Reid (penalty scored); List (penalty missed); James-Wildin (penalty missed); Osborne (penalty missed) |

== Transfers ==
=== Transfers in ===
| Date | Position | Nationality | Name | From | Fee | Ref. |
|---|---|---|---|---|---|---|
| 1 July 2021 | CF | (England) | James Daly | (England) Bristol Rovers | Free transfer | |
| 1 July 2021 | CM | (England) | Arthur Read | (England) Brentford | Undisclosed | |
| 1 July 2021 | CM | (England) | Jake Reeves | (England) Notts County | Free transfer | |
| 1 July 2021 | CM | (Wales) | Jake Taylor | (England) Exeter City | Free transfer | |
| 8 July 2021 | RB | (England) | Bradley Barry | (England) Barrow | Free transfer | |
| 13 July 2021 | CF | (Northern Ireland) | Jamie Reid | (England) Mansfield Town | Undisclosed | |
| 2 August 2021 | GK | (France) | Sacha Bastien | (England) Gillingham | Free transfer | |
| 26 August 2021 | LW | (Portugal) | Bruno Andrade | (England) Salford City | Free transfer | |
| 23 October 2021 | GK | (England) | Adam Smith | (England) Forest Green Rovers | Free transfer | |
| 4 January 2022 | CM | (England) | Ed Upson | (Wales) Newport County | Undisclosed | |
| 6 January 2022 | GK | (England) | Laurie Walker | (England) Milton Keynes Dons | Undisclosed | |

=== Loans in ===
| Date from | Position | Nationality | Name | From | Date until | Ref. |
|---|---|---|---|---|---|---|
| 1 July 2021 | GK | (Ghana) | Joseph Anang | (England) West Ham United | End of season | |
| 31 August 2021 | LB | (England) | Max Melbourne | (England) Lincoln City | 1 January 2022 | |
| 3 January 2022 | GK | (England) | Christy Pym | (England) Peterborough United | End of season | |
| 4 January 2022 | CB | (England) | Michael Bostwick | (England) Burton Albion | End of season | |
| 17 January 2022 | CM | (England) | Zain Westbrooke | (England) Bristol Rovers | End of season | |
| 31 January 2022 | LB | (England) | Bailey Clements | (England) Ipswich Town | End of season | |

=== Loans out ===
| Date from | Position | Nationality | Name | To | Date until | Ref. |
|---|---|---|---|---|---|---|
| 12 July 2021 | CB | (England) | Luis Fernandez | (England) King's Lynn Town | End of season | |
| 2 August 2021 | FW | (England) | Harry Draper | (England) Royston Town | 1 January 2022 | |
| 10 September 2021 | DF | (England) | Sam Dreyer | (England) Hendon | 5 December 2021 | (Note: Sam Dreyer's loan at Hendon was extended by a further month on 8 October.) |
| 10 September 2021 | GK | (England) | Timmy Smith | (England) Biggleswade | 8 October 2021 | |
| 10 September 2021 | MF | (England) | Alfie Williams | (England) Kings Langley | 3 December 2021 | (Note: Alfie Williams' loan at Kings Langley was extended by a further month on 8 October.) |
| 19 November 2021 | GK | (England) | Timmy Smith | (England) Barton Rovers | 10 December 2021 | |
| 18 February 2022 | CB | (England) | Ross Marshall | (England) Barnet | End of season | |
| 18 February 2022 | DM | (England) | Jack Smith | (England) Kettering Town | End of season | |

=== Transfers out ===
| Date | Position | Nationality | Name | To | Fee | Ref. |
|---|---|---|---|---|---|---|
| 15 May 2021 | DM | (France) | Romain Vincelot | Retired | | |
| 1 June 2021 | MF | (England) | Leke Drake | (England) Manchester City | Undisclosed | |
| 10 June 2021 | CF | (England) | Marcus Dinanga | (England) Altrincham | Undisclosed | |
| 30 June 2021 | RW | (England) | Femi Akinwande | (England) Braintree Town | Released | |
| 30 June 2021 | CF | (England) | Jacob Bancroft | (England) Oxford City | Released | |
| 30 June 2021 | CF | (England) | Inih Effiong | (England) Woking | Released | |
| 30 June 2021 | CB | (England) | Jamie Fielding | (England) Tonbridge Angels | Released | |
| 30 June 2021 | DM | (England) | Arthur Iontton | (England) King's Lynn Town | Released | |
| 30 June 2021 | GK | (England) | Billy Johnson | (England) Braintree Town | Released | |
| 30 June 2021 | LB | (England) | Joe Martin | (England) Ebbsfleet United | Released | |
| 30 June 2021 | CF | (England) | Danny Newton | (England) Solihull Moors | Released | |
| 30 June 2021 | LM | (England) | Tom Pett | (England) Port Vale | Rejected contract | |
| 30 June 2021 | CF | (Northern Ireland) | Liam Smyth | (England) Wingate & Finchley | Released | |
| 14 August 2021 | RB | (England) | Jake Bunyan | (England) Hertford Town | Free transfer | |
| 6 January 2022 | AM | (England) | Elliot Osborne | (England) Altrincham | Free transfer | |
| 22 January 2022 | GK | (England) | Adam Smith | (England) Morecambe | Mutual consent | |

== Statistics ==
=== Appearances and goals ===
Last updated 31 August 2021.

| No. | Pos | Nat | Player | Total | | EFL League Two | | EFL Cup | | EFL Trophy | | FA Cup | |
| No. | Pos | Nat | Player | Apps | Goals | Apps | Goals | Apps | Goals | Apps | Goals | Apps | Goals |
Goalkeepers
| 1 | GK | (Ghana) GHA | Joseph Anang | 6 | 0 | 4+0 | 0 | 2+0 | 0 | 0 | 0 | 0 | 0 |
| 13 | GK | (France) FRA | Sacha Bastien | 2 | 0 | 1+0 | 0 | 0 | 0 | 1+0 | 0 | 0 | 0 |
| 31 | GK | (England) ENG | Timmy Smith | 0 | 0 | 0 | 0 | 0 | 0 | 0 | 0 | 0 | 0 |
Defenders
| 2 | DF | (Antigua and Barbuda) ANT | Luther James-Wildin | 8 | 0 | 5+0 | 0 | 2+0 | 0 | 0+1 | 0 | 0 | 0 |
| 3 | DF | (England) ENG | Ben Coker | 8 | 1 | 5+0 | 0 | 2+0 | 1 | 1+0 | 0 | 0 | 0 |
| 5 | DF | (Scotland) SCO | Scott Cuthbert | 5 | 0 | 3+0 | 0 | 1+0 | 0 | 1+0 | 0 | 0 | 0 |
| 6 | DF | (England) ENG | Luke Prosser | 4 | 0 | 2+1 | 0 | 1+0 | 0 | 0 | 0 | 0 | 0 |
| 15 | DF | (Guyana) GUY | Terence Vancooten | 7 | 0 | 5+0 | 0 | 1+1 | 0 | 0 | 0 | 0 | 0 |
| 24 | DF | (England) ENG | Ross Marshall | 4 | 1 | 0+2 | 0 | 1+0 | 0 | 1+0 | 1 | 0 | 0 |
| 25 | DF | (England) ENG | Mackye Townsend-West | 0 | 0 | 0 | 0 | 0 | 0 | 0 | 0 | 0 | 0 |
| 27 | DF | (England) ENG | Bradley Barry | 1 | 0 | 0 | 0 | 0 | 0 | 1+0 | 0 | 0 | 0 |
| 30 | DF | (England) ENG | Luis Fernandez (out on loan) | 0 | 0 | 0 | 0 | 0 | 0 | 0 | 0 | 0 | 0 |
Midfielders
| 4 | MF | (England) ENG | Jake Reeves | 7 | 1 | 5+0 | 1 | 2+0 | 0 | 0 | 0 | 0 | 0 |
| 7 | MF | (England) ENG | Elliott List | 6 | 3 | 3+1 | 1 | 2+0 | 2 | 0 | 0 | 0 | 0 |
| 8 | MF | (Wales) WAL | Jake Taylor | 8 | 0 | 5+0 | 0 | 2+0 | 0 | 0+1 | 0 | 0 | 0 |
| 10 | MF | (England) ENG | Charlie Carter | 4 | 0 | 1+2 | 0 | 1+0 | 0 | 0 | 0 | 0 | 0 |
| 11 | MF | (England) ENG | Elliot Osborne | 5 | 0 | 3+1 | 0 | 1+0 | 0 | 0 | 0 | 0 | 0 |
| 14 | MF | (England) ENG | Chris Lines | 6 | 1 | 3+1 | 1 | 0+1 | 0 | 1+0 | 0 | 0 | 0 |
| 19 | MF | (England) ENG | Arthur Read | 4 | 0 | 1+1 | 0 | 1+0 | 0 | 1+0 | 0 | 0 | 0 |
| 23 | MF | (England) ENG | Jack Smith | 4 | 0 | 1+0 | 0 | 1+1 | 0 | 1+0 | 0 | 0 | 0 |
| 26 | MF | (England) ENG | Alfie Williams | 0 | 0 | 0 | 0 | 0 | 0 | 0 | 0 | 0 | 0 |
Forwards
| 9 | FW | (England) ENG | Luke Norris | 8 | 2 | 4+1 | 2 | 0+2 | 0 | 1+0 | 0 | 0 | 0 |
| 12 | FW | (Portugal) POR | Bruno Andrade | 2 | 0 | 0+1 | 0 | 0 | 0 | 1+0 | 0 | 0 | 0 |
| 17 | FW | (England) ENG | James Daly | 5 | 1 | 0+3 | 0 | 0+1 | 0 | 1+0 | 1 | 0 | 0 |
| 20 | FW | (Northern Ireland) NIR | Jamie Reid | 8 | 1 | 4+1 | 0 | 2+0 | 1 | 0+1 | 0 | 0 | 0 |

=== Top scorers ===
Includes all competitive matches. The list is sorted by squad number when total goals are equal.

Last updated 31 August 2021.

| Rank | Position | Nationality | No. | Player | EFL League Two | EFL Cup | EFL Trophy | FA Cup | Total |
|---|---|---|---|---|---|---|---|---|---|
| 1 | MF | (England) | 7 | Elliott List | 1 | 2 | 0 | 0 | 3 |
| 2 | FW | (England) | 9 | Luke Norris | 2 | 0 | 0 | 0 | 2 |
| 3 | DF | (England) | 3 | Ben Coker | 0 | 1 | 0 | 0 | 1 |
| 3 | MF | (England) | 4 | Jake Reeves | 1 | 0 | 0 | 0 | 1 |
| 3 | MF | (England) | 14 | Chris Lines | 1 | 0 | 0 | 0 | 1 |
| 3 | FW | (England) | 17 | James Daly | 0 | 0 | 1 | 0 | 1 |
| 3 | FW | (Northern Ireland) | 20 | Jamie Reid | 0 | 1 | 0 | 0 | 1 |
| 3 | DF | (England) | 24 | Ross Marshall | 0 | 0 | 1 | 0 | 1 |
| | Own goals | | | | 0 | 0 | 1 | 0 | 1 |
| | TOTALS | | | | 5 | 4 | 3 | 0 | 12 |

=== Clean sheets ===
Includes all competitive matches. The list is sorted by squad number when total clean sheets are equal.

Last updated 31 August 2021.

| Rank | Position | Nationality | No. | Player | EFL League Two | EFL Cup | EFL Trophy | FA Cup | Total |
|---|---|---|---|---|---|---|---|---|---|
1
| 1 | GK | (Ghana) | 1 | Joseph Anang | 2 | 0 | 0 | 0 | 2 |
2
| 2 | GK | (France) | 13 | Sacha Bastien | 0 | 0 | 0 | 0 | 0 |
| TOTALS | | | | | 2 | 0 | 0 | 0 | 2 |

=== Disciplinary record ===
Includes all competitive matches.

Last updated 31 August 2021.

| Position | Nationality | Number | Name | League Two | | | EFL Cup | | | EFL Trophy | | | FA Cup | | | Total | | |
| Position | Nationality | Number | Name | Booked | (yellow card) (yellow-red card) | Sent off (straight red) | Booked | (yellow card) (yellow-red card) | Sent off (straight red) | Booked | (yellow card) (yellow-red card) | Sent off (straight red) | Booked | (yellow card) (yellow-red card) | Sent off (straight red) | Booked | (yellow card) (yellow-red card) | Sent off (straight red) |
| DF | (Guyana) | 15 | Terence Vancooten | 3 | 0 | 0 | 1 | 0 | 0 | 0 | 0 | 0 | 0 | 0 | 0 | 4 | 0 | 0 |
| MF | (England) | 14 | Chris Lines | 1 | 0 | 0 | 0 | 0 | 0 | 1 | 0 | 0 | 0 | 0 | 0 | 2 | 0 | 0 |
| DF | (England) | 3 | Ben Coker | 0 | 0 | 0 | 0 | 0 | 0 | 1 | 0 | 0 | 0 | 0 | 0 | 1 | 0 | 0 |
| MF | (England) | 4 | Jake Reeves | 0 | 0 | 0 | 1 | 0 | 0 | 0 | 0 | 0 | 0 | 0 | 0 | 1 | 0 | 0 |
| DF | (Scotland) | 5 | Scott Cuthbert | 1 | 0 | 0 | 0 | 0 | 0 | 0 | 0 | 0 | 0 | 0 | 0 | 1 | 0 | 0 |
| MF | (Wales) | 8 | Jake Taylor | 1 | 0 | 0 | 0 | 0 | 0 | 0 | 0 | 0 | 0 | 0 | 0 | 1 | 0 | 0 |
| | | | TOTALS | 6 | 0 | 0 | 2 | 0 | 0 | 2 | 0 | 0 | 0 | 0 | 0 | 10 | 0 | 0 |
