= Alfie Williams (footballer) =

English footballer (born 2003)

Personal information
- Full name: Alfie Keith Williams
- Date of birth: 20 April 2003 (age 23)
- Place of birth: Watford, England
- Position: Attacking midfielder

Team information
- Current team: Chesham United

Youth career
- 2014–2016: Tottenham Hotspur
- 2016–2020: Stevenage

Senior career*
Years	Team	Apps	(Gls)
2020–2023	Stevenage	1	(0)
2020	→ Biggleswade (loan)	2	(1)
2021	→ Kings Langley (loan)	17	(5)
2021–2022	→ Hemel Hempstead Town (loan)	8	(1)
2022	→ Kings Langley (loan)	7	(3)
2022	→ Hemel Hempstead Town (loan)	5	(0)
2022	→ Hayes & Yeading United (loan)	8	(0)
2022–2023	→ Royston Town (loan)	27	(1)
2023–2024	Royston Town	27	(4)
2024–2025	Hampton & Richmond Borough	43	(5)
2025–	Chesham United	8	(1)
- * Club domestic league appearances and goals as of 09:15, 12 October 2025 (UTC)

Alfie Keith Williams (born 20 April 2003) is an English professional footballer who plays as an attacking midfielder for National League South club Chesham United.

A graduate of the Stevenage academy, having joined following his release from Tottenham Hotspur at under-12 level, Williams made his first-team debut for Stevenage in May 2021. During his time at the club, he spent seven spells out on loan, including two each at Kings Langley and Hemel Hempstead Town. His final loan move was to Royston Town during the 2022–23 season, a transfer that was made permanent in July 2023. After one season with Royston, he signed for Hampton & Richmond Borough in July 2024, before joining Chesham United in June 2025.

== Career ==
=== Stevenage ===
Williams joined the Stevenage academy after being released by Tottenham Hotspur at under-12 level. As a second-year scholar at Stevenage, he joined Biggleswade of the Southern League Division One Central on loan in October 2020 to gain first-team experience. He made two appearances during the loan, scoring once, before returning to Stevenage when Biggleswade's season was suspended due to restrictions associated with the COVID-19 pandemic. Williams signed his first professional contract with Stevenage on 22 April 2021. Having been an unused substitute on three occasions, he made his professional debut in a 1–0 away victory over Scunthorpe United on 8 May 2021, appearing as an 83rd-minute substitute.

==== Loan spells ====
Williams joined Southern League Premier Division South club Kings Langley on a 28-day loan agreement on 10 September 2021. He made seven appearances during the initial spell, scoring once, before the loan was extended for a further two months on 8 October 2021. Williams scored his first senior hat-trick in Kings Langley's 5–0 victory against Hartley Wintney on 9 November 2021. He returned to Stevenage in December 2021 having scored six goals in 20 appearances in all competitions. Williams joined National League South club Hemel Hempstead Town on loan on 24 December 2021. He scored once in eight appearances before returning to Kings Langley on loan for the remainder of the 2021–22 season. During his second spell with the club, Williams scored three goals in seven matches, including one in a 2–0 win over Salisbury on the final day of the season, a result that ensured Kings Langley avoided relegation by a single point.

Ahead of the 2022–23 season, he rejoined Hemel Hempstead Town on loan until 1 January 2023. After making five appearances during the first month of the loan, Williams was recalled by Stevenage and subsequently loaned to Southern League Premier Division South club Hayes & Yeading United on 17 September 2022. He made 12 appearances in all competitions for Hayes & Yeading before joining Royston Town of the Southern League Premier Division Central on 11 November 2022, on loan for the remainder of the season. He was released by Stevenage upon the expiry of his contract in May 2023.

=== Royston Town ===
Williams joined Royston Town on a permanent basis on 25 July 2023, having scored once in 27 appearances during his loan spell in the 2022–23 season. He established himself as a regular starter during the opening months of the 2023–24 season before an injury ruled him out until the end of January 2024. Williams scored his first goal of the season in a 4–1 victory over Mickleover on 17 February 2024 and finished the campaign with four goals in 32 appearances in all competitions.

=== Hampton & Richmond Borough ===
Williams joined National League South club Hampton & Richmond Borough ahead of the 2024–25 season, signing in July 2024 after impressing manager Alan Julian during a trial period. He made his debut as a 60th-minute substitute in a 3–1 home defeat to Hornchurch on the opening day of the season, before scoring his first goal on his first start in a 1–1 draw with Chelmsford City on 17 August 2024. Williams made 47 appearances in all competitions during the season, scoring five goals and providing two assists, as Hampton & Richmond finished 18th in the league.

=== Chesham United ===
Williams signed for fellow National League South club Chesham United on 14 June 2025.

== Style of play ==
After signing his first professional contract with Stevenage, academy manager Robbie O'Keefe described Williams as "an offensive, flair-type player". A left-footed midfielder, he has been deployed both centrally and in advanced attacking roles. Upon signing for Chesham, the club stated that his performances against them in the previous season had impressed, citing his creativity and attacking intent.

== Career statistics ==
As of match played 11 October 2025

Appearances and goals by club, season and competition
Club	Season	League			FA Cup		EFL Cup		Other		Total	
Club	Season	Division	Apps	Goals	Apps	Goals	Apps	Goals	Apps	Goals	Apps	Goals
Stevenage	2020–21	League Two	1	0	0	0	0	0	0	0	1	0
Stevenage	2021–22	League Two	0	0	0	0	0	0	0	0	0	0
Stevenage	2022–23	League Two	0	0	0	0	0	0	0	0	0	0
Stevenage	Total		1	0	0	0	0	0	0	0	1	0
Biggleswade (loan)	2020–21	SFL Premier Division Central	2	1	0	0	—		0	0	2	1
Kings Langley (loan)	2021–22	SFL Premier Division South	17	5	2	0	—		1 (Note: Appearance(s) in FA Trophy)	1	20	6
Hemel Hempstead Town (loan)	2021–22	National League South	8	1	—		—		—		8	1
Kings Langley (loan)	2021–22	SFL Premier Division South	7	3	—		—		—		7	3
Hemel Hempstead Town (loan)	2022–23	National League South	5	0	—		—		0	0	5	0
Hayes & Yeading United (loan)	2022–23	SFL Premier Division South	8	0	2	0	—		2	0	12	0
Royston Town (loan)	2022–23	SFL Premier Division Central	27	1	0	0	—		0	0	27	1
Royston Town	2023–24	SFL Premier Division Central	27	4	2	0	—		3 (Note: One appearance in FA Trophy; one appearance in Herts Charity Cup; one appearance in Herts Senior Cup)	0	32	4
Royston Town	Total		54	5	2	0	0	0	3	0	59	5
Hampton & Richmond Borough	2024–25	National League South	43	5	1	0	—		3	0	47	5
Chesham United	2025–26	National League South	8	1	1	0	—		1 (Note: Appearance in Berks & Bucks Senior Cup)	0	10	1
Career total			153	21	8	0	0	0	10	1	171	22
