= Ross Marshall =

English association football player

Personal information
- Full name: Ross Steven Marshall
- Date of birth: 9 October 1999 (age 27)
- Place of birth: Norwich, England
- Height: 6 ft 3 in (1.91 m)
- Positions: Centre-back; defensive midfielder

Team information
- Current team: Bishop's Stortford

Youth career
- 2014: Broxbourne Borough
- 2014–2019: Ipswich Town

Senior career*
Years	Team	Apps	(Gls)
2018–2019	Ipswich Town	0	(0)
2018	→ Lowestoft Town (loan)	4	(0)
2019	→ Braintree Town (loan)	0	(0)
2019–2020	Maidstone United	21	(1)
2020–2022	Stevenage	20	(0)
2022	→ Barnet (loan)	16	(0)
2022–2024	Torquay United	61	(6)
2024–2025	Dulwich Hamlet	14	(0)
2025–	Bishop's Stortford	0	(0)
- * Club domestic league appearances and goals as of 00:36, 10 October 2025 (UTC)

Ross Steven Marshall (born 9 October 1999) is an English professional footballer who plays as a centre-back or defensive midfielder for Southern League Premier Division Central club Bishop's Stortford.

Marshall began his career at Broxbourne Borough before joining Ipswich Town in 2014. During his time in the Ipswich academy, he had loan spells with Lowestoft Town and Braintree Town. After leaving Ipswich in 2019, he signed for Maidstone United in the National League South. Marshall joined League Two club Stevenage in July 2020, before moving to Torquay United in July 2022, where he made 67 appearances across two seasons. He spent the 2024–25 season with Dulwich Hamlet in the Isthmian League Premier Division, joining Bishop's Stortford in July 2025.

== Career ==
=== Early career ===
Marshall began his career in the Broxbourne Borough academy, playing in the Eastern Junior Alliance, before joining Ipswich Town's youth system in July 2014. He became a full-time academy player upon signing a two-year scholarship with Ipswich in July 2016. During his time in the academy, he joined Lowestoft Town on a youth loan on 16 March 2018 for the remainder of the 2017–18 season. His scholarship was extended by a further year in July 2018, running until June 2019. In January 2019, he spent time on loan at National League club Braintree Town, although he did not make any first-team appearances. Marshall was released by Ipswich in June 2019.

=== Maidstone United and Stevenage ===
Following his release from Ipswich, Marshall signed a one-year deal with National League South club Maidstone United on 11 October 2019. The move reunited him with manager Hakan Hayrettin, who had previously managed him during his loan spell at Braintree Town. He made his debut the following day, playing the full match in a 1–1 draw away at Bath City. Marshall scored his first goal for Maidstone in a 4–1 home victory over Dulwich Hamlet on 28 December 2019, and went on to make 25 appearances in all competitions during the 2019–20 season, scoring once.

After one season at Maidstone, Marshall signed for League Two club Stevenage on 10 July 2020. He made his debut as an 87th-minute substitute in a 3–0 home victory over Oldham Athletic on 19 September 2020. He joined National League club Barnet on loan on 18 February 2022, on an agreement until the end of the 2021–22 season. He made 18 appearances during his loan at Barnet before returning to Stevenage, who subsequently made him available for transfer in May 2022.

=== Torquay United ===
Marshall signed for National League club Torquay United on 5 July 2022. He made his debut in a 0–0 draw with Oldham Athletic on 6 August 2022. During the opening month of his Torquay career, he received four yellow cards and one red card in his first four appearances, before scoring his first goal in his fifth match, a 3–1 defeat to Woking on 29 August 2022. Marshall made 29 appearances and scored twice during his first season, which ended in Torquay's relegation to the National League South. He was a regular in the 2023–24 season, making 38 appearances and scoring four goals. Torquay were deducted one point that season for fielding Marshall while he was suspended in a 1–1 draw with Weymouth on 2 March 2024; both the club and player were fined £250. He left Torquay at the end of his contract in June 2024.

=== Dulwich Hamlet and Bishop's Stortford ===
Marshall signed for Isthmian League Premier Division club Dulwich Hamlet on 8 August 2024, joining manager Hayrettin for a third time, despite interest from several other clubs. He sustained an injury in a 2–2 draw with Leatherhead, forcing his substitution after 24 minutes and ruling him out for three months. Marshall made 15 appearances during the season, before signing for Bishop's Stortford of the Southern League Premier Division Central on 16 July 2025.

== Style of play ==
Marshall has been deployed as both a centre-back and a defensive midfielder. Upon signing for Stevenage, manager Alex Revell characterised him as a "strong, combative defensive midfielder".

== Career statistics ==
As of match played 1 February 2025

Appearances and goals by club, season and competition
Club	Season	League			FA Cup		EFL Cup		Other		Total	
Club	Season	Division	Apps	Goals	Apps	Goals	Apps	Goals	Apps	Goals	Apps	Goals
Ipswich Town	2017–18	Championship	0	0	0	0	0	0	0	0	0	0
Ipswich Town	2018–19	Championship	0	0	0	0	0	0	0	0	0	0
Ipswich Town	Total		0	0	0	0	0	0	0	0	0	0
Lowestoft Town (loan)	2017–18	Isthmian League Premier Division	4	0	0	0	—		0	0	4	0
Braintree Town (loan)	2018–19	National League	0	0	0	0	—		0	0	0	0
Maidstone United	2019–20	National League South	21	1	2	0	—		1 (Note: Appearance(s) in FA Trophy)	0	24	1
Stevenage	2020–21	League Two	15	0	1	0	0	0	3 (Note: Appearances in EFL Trophy)	0	19	0
Stevenage	2021–22	League Two	5	0	0	0	1	0	2	1	8	1
Stevenage	Total		20	0	1	0	1	0	5	1	27	1
Barnet (loan)	2021–22	National League	16	0	—		—		2 (Note: Appearances in Middlesex Senior Cup)	0	18	0
Torquay United	2022–23	National League	27	2	0	0	—		2	0	29	2
Torquay United	2023–24	National League South	34	4	2	0	—		2	0	38	4
Torquay United	Total		61	6	2	0	0	0	4	0	67	6
Dulwich Hamlet	2024–25	Isthmian League Premier Division	14	0	1	0	—		0	0	15	0
Bishop's Stortford	2025–26	Southern League Premier Division Central	0	0	0	0	—		0	0	0	0
Career total			135	7	5	0	1	0	12	1	154	8
