= Ben Coker =

English footballer (born 1980)

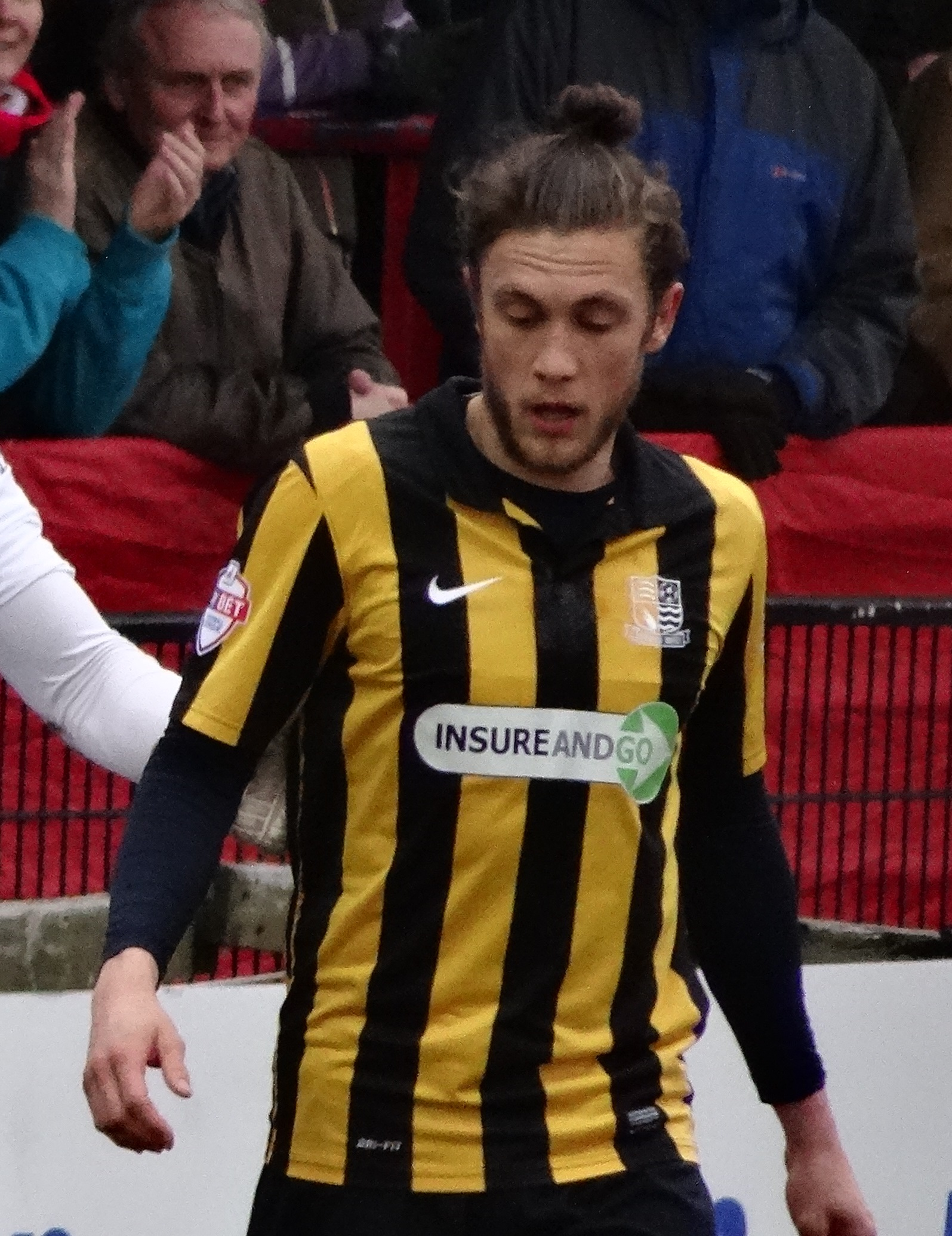
- Coker playing for Southend United in 2014

Personal information
- Full name: Ben Coker
- Date of birth: 17 June 1989 (age 37)
- Place of birth: Hatfield, England
- Height: 5 ft 11 in (1.80 m)
- Positions: Defender; winger

Team information
- Current team: Canvey Island (on loan from Chatham Town)

Youth career
- 2000–2005: Cambridge United
- 2005–2008: Northampton Town

Senior career*
Years	Team	Apps	(Gls)
2007	Ånge IF	6	(2)
2008	Histon	1	(0)
2008	Barton Rovers	2	(0)
2008–2010	Bury Town	66	(17)
2010–2013	Colchester United	41	(0)
2010	→ Chelmsford City (loan)	4	(0)
2012	→ Histon (loan)	5	(0)
2013	Histon	14	(0)
2013–2019	Southend United	186	(4)
2019–2020	Lincoln City	0	(0)
2020	→ Cambridge United (loan)	0	(0)
2020	→ Stevenage (loan)	0	(0)
2020–2022	Stevenage	74	(1)
2022–2023	Solihull Moors	28	(1)
2023–2025	Barnet	64	(2)
2025–2026	Ebbsfleet United	35	(0)
2026–	Chatham Town	8	(0)
2026–	→ Canvey Island (loan)	2	(0)
- * Club domestic league appearances and goals as of 09:44, 10 October 2026 (UTC)

Ben Coker (born 17 June 1989) is an English professional footballer who plays as a defender or midfielder for Canvey Island, on loan from Isthmian League Premier Division club Chatham Town.

== Career ==
In 2007, Coker spent time with sixth-tier Swedish club Ånge IF, scoring two goals.

Coker joined Bury Town in October 2008 from fellow Southern League side Barton Rovers. He was previously with Conference side Histon. He impressed on his debut for Bury, earning the sponsors man of the match award. Coker helped the Suffolk club win promotion to the Isthmian League.

=== Colchester United ===
In summer 2010, Coker joined Colchester United after he impressed in a trial period at the end of 2009–10 season, having done well for non-league Bury Town during the 2009–10 campaign. On 30 September 2010, Coker joined Chelmsford City on loan for a month. The loan was extended by a further month and was given permission to play in an FA Cup tie against Hendon.

On 14 January 2011, Coker made his debut for Colchester against Bournemouth in a 2–1 victory, providing assists for both goals. He was awarded the Colchester United Young Player of the Year award at the end of the 2010–11 season, his first with the club. On 15 May 2012, Coker signed a 12-month contract extension to see him through to summer 2013 with Colchester. On 12 October 2012, Coker was loaned to former club Histon on a month-long deal.

On 4 February 2013, Coker had his contract with Colchester cancelled by mutual consent having made only two first-team appearances in the 2012–13 season.

He returned to Histon permanently on 8 February 2013 following a loan spell earlier in the same season.

=== Southend United ===
Prior to the 2013–14 season, he played in three friendlies for Southend United, impressing sufficiently in the games he played to be offered a contract by manager Phil Brown. On 16 April 2014, Coker signed a new two-year deal at Southend United, keeping him contracted until June 2016, and on 7 August 2015 this was extended for another 3 years with an option for a further year.

On 27 October 2018 he suffered a serious knee injury whilst playing for Southend against Sunderland, and did not play any more games that season. His struggle to recover from the injury was the subject of a BBC documentary series entitled 'Coming Back'. He never played any more games for Southend, and was released by them at the end of the 2018–19 season.

=== Lincoln City ===
On 23 August 2019 it was announced that he had signed for Lincoln City. He only played one cup game before being loaned to Cambridge United in January 2020.

Coker signed a season-long loan at League Two club Stevenage on 7 August 2020.

=== Stevenage ===
On 16 October 2020, he made his season-long loan permanent at Stevenage. Coker was released at the end of the 2021–22 season.

=== Solihull Moors ===
On 4 August 2022, Coker signed for National League club Solihull Moors on a one-year deal. At the end of the 2022–23 season, Coker was one of eight players to be released by the club.

=== Barnet ===
Coker joined Barnet for the 2023-24 season. After winning the National League title in the 2024-25 season, Coker left the Bees after two goals in 71 appearances.

=== Ebbsfleet United ===
Coker joined Ebbsfleet United for the 2025-26 season.

=== Chatham Town ===
On 23 June 2026, Coker joined Isthmian League Premier Division club Chatham Town.

On 3 October 2026, Coker joined Isthmian League North Division side Canvey Island on a one-month loan deal.

== Personal life ==
Coker developed type 1 diabetes at the age of 15.

== Career statistics ==
As of end of 2025–26 season

Appearances and goals by club, season and competition
Club	Season	League			FA Cup		League Cup		Other		Total	
Club	Season	Division	Apps	Goals	Apps	Goals	Apps	Goals	Apps	Goals	Apps	Goals
Histon	2008–09	Conference Premier	1	0	0	0	—		0	0	1	0
Colchester United	2010–11	League One	20	0	0	0	0	0	0	0	20	0
Colchester United	2011–12	League One	20	0	2	1	1	0	0	0	23	1
Colchester United	2012–13	League One	1	0	0	0	0	0	1 (Note: Appearances in the Football League Trophy)	0	2	0
Colchester United	Total		41	0	2	1	1	0	1	0	45	1
Chelmsford City (loan)	2010–11	Conference South	4	0	2	0	—		0	0	6	0
Histon (loan)	2012–13	Conference North	5	0	0	0	—		0	0	5	0
Histon (loan)	2012–13	Conference North	11	0	0	0	—		0	0	11	0
Histon (loan)	Total		16	0	0	0	—		0	0	16	0
Southend United	2013–14	League Two	45	2	4	0	1	0	3 (Note: One appearance in the Football League Trophy and two in the League Two play-offs)	0	53	2
Southend United	2014–15	League Two	32	1	0	0	1	0	4 (Note: One appearance in the Football League Trophy and three in the League Two play-offs)	0	37	1
Southend United	2015–16	League One	40	1	1	0	1	0	3	0	45	1
Southend United	2016–17	League One	31	0	1	0	1	0	1 (Note: Appearance in the EFL Trophy)	0	34	0
Southend United	2017–18	League One	22	0	0	0	0	0	0	0	22	0
Southend United	2018–19	League One	16	0	0	0	1	0	0	0	17	0
Southend United	Total		186	4	6	0	5	0	11	0	207	4
Lincoln City	2019–20	League One	0	0	0	0	0	0	1	0	1	0
Cambridge United (loan)	2019–20	League Two	0	0	0	0	0	0	0	0	0	0
Stevenage (loan)	2020–21	League Two	0	0	0	0	1	0	1	0	2	0
Stevenage	2020–21	League Two	38	0	3	1	0	0	0	0	41	1
Stevenage	2021–22	League Two	36	1	2	0	2	1	1	0	41	1
Stevenage	Total		74	1	5	1	3	1	2	0	84	2
Solihull Moors	2022–23	National League	28	1	3	0	—		2 (Note: Appearance(s) in FA Trophy)	0	33	1
Barnet	2023–24	National League	33	0	1	0	—		5 (Note: Three appearances in FA Trophy, one appearance in Middlesex Senior Cup, one appearance in National League playoffs)	0	39	0
Barnet	2024–25	National League	31	2	2	0	—		1	0	34	2
Barnet	Total		64	2	3	0	0	0	6	0	73	2
Ebbsfleet United	2025–26	National League South	35	0	3	1	—		2	0	40	1
Career totals			449	8	24	3	9	1	25	0	506	12

== Honours ==
Southend United

- Football League Two play-offs: 2015

Barnet

- National League: 2024–25

Individual

- PFA Team of the Year: 2014–15 League Two
