= 2017–18 in French football =

Football in France
- Season: 2017–18

Men's football
- Ligue 1: Paris Saint-Germain
- Ligue 2: Reims
- Championnat National: Red Star
- Coupe de France: Paris Saint-Germain
- Coupe de la Ligue: Paris Saint-Germain
- Trophée des Champions: Paris Saint-Germain

Women's football
- Division 1: Lyon
- Coupe de France: Paris Saint-Germain

The following article is a summary of the 2017–18 football season in France, which was the 84th season of competitive football in the country and ran from July 2017 to June 2018.

== League tables ==
=== Ligue 1 ===
Pos	Team	Pld	W	D	L	GF	GA	GD	Pts	Qualification or relegation
1	Paris Saint-Germain (C)	38	29	6	3	108	29	+79	93	Qualification for the Champions League group stage
2	Monaco	38	24	8	6	85	45	+40	80	Qualification for the Champions League group stage
3	Lyon	38	23	9	6	87	43	+44	78	Qualification for the Champions League group stage
4	Marseille	38	22	11	5	80	47	+33	77	Qualification for the Europa League group stage (Note: Since the winners of the 2017–18 Coupe de France and the 2017–18 Coupe de la Ligue, Paris Saint-Germain, qualified for European competition based on league position, the spot awarded to the Coupe de France winners (Europa League group stage) was passed to the fourth-placed team and the spot awarded to the Coupe de la Ligue winners (Europa League third qualifying round) was passed to the sixth-placed team. The fifth-placed team received the spot in Europa League third qualifying round originally designated to the fourth-placed team.)
5	Rennes	38	16	10	12	50	44	+6	58	Qualification for the Europa League group stage
6	Bordeaux	38	16	7	15	53	48	+5	55	Qualification for the Europa League second qualifying round
7	Saint-Étienne	38	15	10	13	47	50	−3	55	
8	Nice	38	15	9	14	53	52	+1	54	
9	Nantes	38	14	10	14	36	41	−5	52	
10	Montpellier	38	11	18	9	36	33	+3	51	
11	Dijon	38	13	9	16	55	73	−18	48	
12	Guingamp	38	12	11	15	48	59	−11	47	
13	Amiens	38	12	9	17	37	42	−5	45	
14	Angers	38	9	14	15	42	52	−10	41	
15	Strasbourg	38	9	11	18	44	67	−23	38	
16	Caen	38	10	8	20	27	52	−25	38	
17	Lille	38	10	8	20	41	67	−26	38	
18	Toulouse (O)	38	9	10	19	38	54	−16	37	Qualification for the relegation play-off final
19	Troyes (R)	38	9	6	23	32	59	−27	33	Relegation to Ligue 2
20	Metz (R)	38	6	8	24	34	76	−42	26	Relegation to Ligue 2

Source: Ligue 1 and Soccerway
Rules for classification: 1) Points; 2) Goal difference; 3) Head-to-head points; 4) Head-to-head goal difference; 5) Head-to-head goals scored; 6) Head-to-head away goals; 7) Goals scored; 8) Away goals scored; 9) Most goals scored in one league match; 10) Fair-play points
(C) Champions; (O) Play-off winners; (R) Relegated

=== Ligue 2 ===
Pos	Team	Pld	W	D	L	GF	GA	GD	Pts	Promotion or Relegation
1	Reims (C, P)	38	28	4	6	74	24	+50	88	Promotion to Ligue 1
2	Nîmes (P)	38	22	7	9	75	37	+38	73	Promotion to Ligue 1
3	Ajaccio	38	20	8	10	62	43	+19	68	Qualification to promotion play-offs semi-final
4	Le Havre	38	19	9	10	53	34	+19	66	Qualification to promotion play-offs quarter-final
5	Brest	38	18	11	9	58	43	+15	65	Qualification to promotion play-offs quarter-final
6	Clermont	38	17	12	9	54	36	+18	63	
7	Lorient	38	18	8	12	61	46	+15	62	
8	Paris FC	38	16	13	9	46	36	+10	61	
9	Châteauroux	38	17	9	12	50	50	0	60	
10	Sochaux	38	15	8	15	51	62	−11	53	
11	Auxerre	38	13	8	17	51	55	−4	47	
12	Orléans	38	12	10	16	52	61	−9	46	
13	Valenciennes	38	12	9	17	50	64	−14	45	
14	Lens	38	11	10	17	48	49	−1	43	
15	Niort	38	11	9	18	47	60	−13	42	
16	Gazélec Ajaccio	38	11	8	19	35	60	−25	41	
17	Nancy	38	9	11	18	39	54	−15	38	
18	Bourg-Péronnas (R)	38	10	6	22	50	87	−37	36	Qualification to relegation play-offs
19	Quevilly-Rouen (R)	38	9	6	23	45	66	−21	33	Relegation to Championnat National
20	Tours (R)	38	5	8	25	34	68	−34	23	Relegation to Championnat National

Source: Ligue 2
Rules for classification: 1) Points; 2) Goal difference; 3) Head-to-head points; 4) Head-to-head goal difference; 5) Head-to-head goals scored; 6) Head-to-head away goals; 7) Goals scored; 8) Away goals scored; 9) Most goals scored in one league match; 10) Fair-play points
(C) Champions; (P) Promoted; (R) Relegated

=== Championnat National ===
Pos	Team	Pld	W	D	L	GF	GA	GD	Pts	Promotion or relegation
1	Red Star (C, P)	32	15	11	6	41	25	+16	56	Promotion to Ligue 2
2	Béziers (P)	32	13	13	6	41	29	+12	52	Promotion to Ligue 2
3	Grenoble (O, P)	32	13	12	7	33	23	+10	51	Qualification to promotion play-off
4	Rodez	32	12	9	11	33	33	0	45	
5	Avranches	32	11	10	11	39	42	−3	43	
6	Lyon-Duchère	32	10	12	10	30	33	−3	42	
7	Boulogne (Note: Boulogne were penalised for fielding a suspended player in the game against Créteil on 17 November 2017. The game originally ended 1–1. Créteil were awarded a 3–0 victory, and Boulogne were deducted a point.)	32	10	13	9	36	34	+2	42	
8	Laval	32	10	12	10	37	36	+1	42	
9	Dunkerque (Note: On 28 November 2017, the FFF announced that Dunkerque would be deducted three points due to breaking the financial rules of the league. Dunkerque appealed, but the decision was upheld.)	32	11	11	10	39	39	0	41	
10	Pau	32	9	13	10	43	37	+6	40	
11	L'Entente SSG	32	8	16	8	41	46	−5	40	
12	Chambly	32	10	10	12	36	32	+4	40	
13	Concarneau	32	9	13	10	38	38	0	40	
14	Cholet	32	10	9	13	49	53	−4	39	
15	Les Herbiers (R)	32	9	12	11	37	45	−8	39	Relegation to National 2
16	Marseille Consolat (R)	32	9	10	13	37	46	−9	37	Relegation to National 2
17	Créteil (R)	32	6	8	18	29	48	−19	26	Relegation to National 2

Source: FFF.fr
Rules for classification: 1) points; 2) head-to-head results; 3) head-to-head goal difference; 4) goal difference; 5) number of goals scored; 6) fair play points; 7) draw
(C) Champions; (O) Play-off winners; (P) Promoted; (R) Relegated

=== Championnat National 2 ===
Group A
Pos	Team	Pld	Pts
1	Marignane-Gignac (P)	30	57
2	Toulon	30	57
3	Colomiers	30	51
4	Bergerac	30	49
5	Fréjus Saint-Raphaël	30	49
6	Martigues	30	47
7	Sète	30	46
8	Monaco (res)	30	43
9	Grasse	30	39
10	Hyères	30	36
11	Nice (res)	30	35
12	Mont-de-Marsan	30	32
13	Stade Bordelais	30	31
14	Marseille (res)	30	28
15	Tarbes (R)	30	26
16	Paulhan-Pézenas (R)	30	21

Source: fff.fr
(P) Promoted;
(R) Relegated

Group B
Pos	Team	Pld	Pts
1	Villefranche (P)	30	58
2	Annecy	30	57
3	Andrézieux	30	52
4	Jura Sud	30	51
5	Schiltigheim	30	50
6	Yzeure	30	46
7	Épinal	30	41
8	Paris Saint-Germain (res)	30	40
9	Belfort	30	39
10	Le Puy	30	39
11	Lyon (res)	30	37
12	Chasselay MDA	30	37
13	Saint-Priest	30	35
14	St-Louis Neuweg (R)	30	34
15	Montceau (R)	30	33
16	Raon-l'Étape (R)	30	13

Source: fff.fr
(P) Promoted;
(R) Relegated

Group C
Pos	Team	Pld	Pts
1	Drancy (P)	30	59
2	Sedan	30	54
3	Sainte-Geneviève	30	54
4	Fleury	30	51
5	Arras FA	30	48
6	Saint-Maur	30	46
7	Bastia-Borgo	30	44
8	Poissy	30	40
9	Croix	30	36
10	Lens (res)	30	34
11	Lille (res)	30	34
12	Furiani-Agliani	30	34
13	Reims (res)	30	32
14	AC Amiens (R)	30	30
15	Viry-Châtillon (R)	30	25
16	Beauvais (R)	30	24

Source: fff.fr
(P) Promoted;
(R) Relegated

Group D
Pos	Team	Pld	Pts
1	Le Mans (P)	30	60
2	Saint-Brieuc	30	57
3	Saint-Malo	30	48
4	Lorient (res)	30	45
5	Romorantin	30	41
6	Saint-Pryvé	30	40
7	Chartres (M)	30	39
8	Le Havre (res)	30	38
9	Granville	30	37
10	Mantes	30	37
11	Vitré	30	36
12	Limoges (R)	30	34
13	Boulogne-Billancourt	30	34
14	Trélissac	30	33
15	Rennes (res) (R)	30	32
16	Fontenay (R)	30	25

Source: fff.fr
(M) Merged after the season;
(P) Promoted;
(R) Relegated

== Cup competitions ==
=== 2017–18 Coupe de France ===
==== Final ====
8 May 2018
21:05 CEST

Les Herbiers VF	0–2	Paris Saint-Germain
	Report	Lo Celso 26'; Cavani 74' (pen.)

Stade de France, Saint-Denis
Attendance: 73,772
Referee: Mikael Lesage

=== 2017–18 Coupe de la Ligue ===
==== Final ====
The final was held on 31 March 2018 at the Nouveau Stade de Bordeaux.

31 March 2018
21:05 CEST

Paris Saint-Germain	3–0	Monaco
Cavani 8' (pen.), 85'; Di María 21'	Report

Nouveau Stade de Bordeaux, Bordeaux
Attendance: 41,248
Referee: Clément Turpin

=== 2017 Trophée des Champions ===
29 July 2017
20:00 WEST

Monaco	1–2	Paris Saint-Germain
Sidibé 30'	Report	Dani Alves 51'; Rabiot 63'

Stade Ibn Batouta, Tangier
Attendance: 43,761
Referee: Noureddine El Jaafari (Morocco)
