= 2022 EFL Trophy final =

2022 EFL Trophy Final
- Event: 2021–22 EFL Trophy
Rotherham United	Sutton United
4	2
- After extra time
- Date: 3 April 2022
- Venue: Wembley Stadium, London
- Referee: Sebastian Stockbridge
- Attendance: 30,688

The 2022 EFL Trophy Final (known for sponsorship reasons as the 2022 Papa Johns Trophy) was a football match played at Wembley Stadium, London, on 3 April 2022. It decided the winners of the 2021–22 EFL Trophy, the 38th edition of the competition, a knock-out tournament for the 48 teams in League One and League Two and 16 category one academy sides. Rotherham United beat Sutton United 4–2 after extra time. Sutton led 2–1 going into injury time at the end of the second half before Jordi Osei-Tutu scored a 96th-minute equaliser; Chiedozie Ogbene and Michael Ihiekwe then scored in extra time to give Rotherham their second EFL Trophy title.

== Route to the final ==
=== Rotherham United ===
Pos	Div	Team	Pld	W	PW	PL	L	GF	GA	GD	Pts	Qualification
1	L1	Rotherham United	3	3	0	0	0	15	1	+14	9	Advance to Round 2
2	L1	Doncaster Rovers	3	2	0	0	1	5	9	−4	6	Advance to Round 2
3	ACA	Manchester City U21	3	1	0	0	2	4	7	−3	3	
4	L2	Scunthorpe United	3	0	0	0	3	3	10	−7	0	

Source: EFL.com

7 September 2021 Group Stage	Doncaster Rovers	0–6	Rotherham United	Doncaster
19:00 BST		Report	Miller 13'; Ladapo 15'; Jones 16' (o.g.); Grigg 49' Hull 67'; Mattock 85'	Stadium: Keepmoat Stadium; Attendance: 1,765; Referee: Ben Speedie

5 October 2021 Group Stage	Rotherham United	4–1	Scunthorpe United	Rotherham
19:00 BST	Grigg 8'; Ladapo 20'; Odoffin 82'; Smith 90+1'	Report	Loft 65'	Stadium: New York Stadium; Attendance: 1,439; Referee: Andrew Kitchen

26 October 2021 Group Stage	Rotherham United	5–0	Manchester City U21	Rotherham
19:00 BST	Grigg 51'; Sadlier 63' (pen.), 81', 90'; Hull 66'	Report		Stadium: New York Stadium; Attendance: 1,908; Referee: Sam Barrott

30 November 2021 Round 2	Rotherham United	1–1 (5–3 p)	Port Vale	Rotherham
19:00 GMT	Smith 56'	Report	Amoo 87'	Stadium: New York Stadium; Referee: Peter Wright
	Penalties
	Smith (penalty scored); Sadlier (penalty scored); Ferguson (penalty scored); Ladapo (penalty scored); Mattock (penalty scored)		Conlon (penalty scored); Walker (penalty scored); Rodney (penalty scored); Amoo (penalty missed)

4 January 2022 Round 3	Crewe Alexandra	2–4	Rotherham United	Crewe
19:00 GMT	Mandron 11'; Robertson 71'	Report	Sadlier 41'; Smith 57'; Kayode 82'; Ladapo 90+4'	Stadium: Gresty Road; Attendance: 771; Referee: Rebecca Welch

25 January 2022 Quarter-Final	Rotherham United	1–1 (7–6 p)	Cambridge United	Rotherham
19:00 GMT	Harding 9'	Report	Digby 40'	Stadium: New York Stadium; Attendance: 2,239; Referee: Martin Coy
	Penalties
	Ferguson (penalty scored); Ladapo (penalty scored); Miller (penalty scored); Wiles (penalty scored); Mattock (penalty scored); Lindsay (penalty scored); Ihiekwe (penalty scored)		Smith (penalty scored); Dunk (penalty scored); Brophy (penalty scored); Williams (penalty scored); Knibbs (penalty scored); Mitov (penalty scored); May (penalty missed)

9 March 2022 Semi-Final	Hartlepool United	2–2 (4–5 p)	Rotherham United	Hartlepool
19.45 GMT	Grey 29'; Molyneux 55'	Report	Smith 50', 63'	Stadium: Victoria Park; Referee: Bobby Madley
	Penalties
	Featherstone (penalty scored); Sterry (penalty scored); Shelton (penalty scored); Molyneux (penalty missed); Bogle (penalty scored); Crawford (penalty missed)		Smith (penalty scored); Ferguson (penalty scored); Barlaser (penalty scored); Wiles (penalty missed); MacDonald (penalty scored); Miller (penalty scored)

=== Sutton United ===
Pos	Div	Team	Pld	W	PW	PL	L	GF	GA	GD	Pts	Qualification
1	L2	Sutton United	3	3	0	0	0	6	0	+6	9	Advance to Round 2
2	L1	Portsmouth	3	1	0	0	2	6	7	−1	3	Advance to Round 2
3	L1	AFC Wimbledon	3	1	0	0	2	5	6	−1	3	
4	ACA	Crystal Palace U21	3	1	0	0	2	2	6	−4	3	

Source: EFL.com

31 August 2021 Group Stage	Sutton United	3–0	Crystal Palace U21	Sutton, London
19:30 BST	Sho-Silva 31'; Smith 52'; Korboa 81'	Report		Stadium: Gander Green Lane; Attendance: 1,504; Referee: David Rock

12 October 2021 Group Stage	Portsmouth	0–2	Sutton United	Portsmouth
19:45 BST		Report	Olaofe 55'; John 71'	Stadium: Fratton Park; Attendance: 2,490; Referee: Lee Swabey

9 November 2021 Group Stage	Sutton United	1–0	AFC Wimbledon	Sutton, London
19:45 GMT	Wilson 47'	Report		Stadium: Gander Green Lane; Attendance: 2,458; Referee: Neil Hair

30 November 2021 Round 2	Sutton United	0–0 (4–3 p)	Stevenage	Sutton, London
19:45 GMT		Report		Stadium: Gander Green Lane; Attendance: 770; Referee: Sam Purkiss
	Penalties
	Eastmond (penalty scored); Davis (penalty scored); Milsom (penalty scored); Korboa (penalty missed); Olaofe (penalty missed); Goodliffe (penalty scored)		Norris (penalty scored); Reeves (penalty scored); Reid (penalty scored); List (penalty missed); James-Wildin (penalty missed); Osborne (penalty missed)

4 January 2022 Round 3	Sutton United	2–1	Colchester United	Sutton, London
19:45 GMT	Turner 7' (o.g.); Wilson 52'	Report	Sears 45'	Stadium: Borough Sports Ground; Attendance: 977; Referee: Charles Breakspear

25 January 2022 Quarter-Final	Sutton United	1–0	Harrogate Town	Sutton, London
19:45 GMT	Eastmond 80'	Report		Stadium: Borough Sports Ground; Attendance: 1,499; Referee: Christopher Pollard

8 March 2022 Semi-Final	Wigan Athletic	1–1 (6–7 p)	Sutton United	Wigan
19.45 GMT	McClean 39'	Report	Randall 29'	Stadium: DW Stadium; Attendance: 6,547; Referee: James Bell
	Penalties
	Power (penalty missed); Shinnie (penalty scored); Keane (penalty scored); McClean (penalty scored); Magennis (penalty scored); Edwards (penalty scored); McGrath (penalty scored); Darikwa (penalty missed)		Eastmond (penalty scored); Beautyman (penalty missed); Milsom (penalty scored); Goodliffe (penalty scored); Bennett (penalty scored); Boldewijn (penalty scored); Bouzanis (penalty scored); John (penalty scored)

== Match ==
3 April 2022
15:00

Rotherham United	4–2 (a.e.t.)	Sutton United
Wiles 42'; Osei-Tutu 90+6'; Ogbene 96'; Ihiekwe 112'	Report	Wilson 30'; Eastmond 48'

Wembley Stadium, London
Attendance: 30,688
Referee: Seb Stockbridge

Rotherham United	Sutton United

GK	1	(Sweden) Viktor Johansson
CB	3	(England) Joe Mattock (substituted off) 80'
CB	20	(England) Michael Ihiekwe
CB	6	(England) Richard Wood (c)
DM	4	(England) Daniel Barlaser (substituted off) 90+4'
RM	11	(Republic of Ireland) Chiedozie Ogbene
CM	18	(England) Oliver Rathbone (substituted off) 61'
CM	8	(England) Ben Wiles (yellow card) 15'
LM	14	(England) Mickel Miller (substituted off) 80'
CF	19	(Republic of Ireland) Joshua Kayode (substituted off) 60'
CF	24	(England) Michael Smith
Substitutes:
GK	30	(England) Josh Chapman
DF	23	(England) Rarmani Edmonds-Green
DF	2	(Jamaica) Wes Harding (substituted on) 61'
MF	7	(England) Jordi Osei-Tutu (substituted on) 80'
MF	16	(Scotland) Jamie Lindsay (substituted on) 90+4'
MF	17	(Northern Ireland) Shane Ferguson (substituted on) 80'
FW	10	(England) Freddie Ladapo (substituted on) 60'
Manager
(England) Paul Warne

GK	1	(Australia) Dean Bouzanis
RB	22	(England) Joe Kizzi (yellow card) 92'
CB	6	(England) Louis John (yellow card) 86'
CB	5	(England) Ben Goodliffe (substituted off) 73'
LB	24	(England) Robert Milsom (substituted off) 82'
RM	7	(England) David Ajiboye
CM	15	(England) Craig Eastmond (substituted off) 82' (c)
CM	10	(England) Harry Beautyman
LM	11	(England) Will Randall
CF	9	(Lebanon) Omar Bugiel (substituted off) 82'
CF	25	(England) Donovan Wilson (substituted off) 67'
Substitutes:
GK	12	(England) Stuart Nelson
DF	4	(England) Coby Rowe (substituted on) 73'
DF	3	(England) Ben Wyatt (substituted on) 82'
MF	8	(England) Kenny Davis (substituted on) 82'
MF	20	(Netherlands) Enzio Boldewijn
FW	26	(England) Richie Bennett (substituted on) 82'
FW	16	(England) Isaac Olaofe (substituted on) 67'
Manager
(England) Matt Gray
