= 2021–22 Sutton United F.C. season =

Sutton United F.C.
2021–22 season
- Chairman: Bruce Elliott
- Manager: Matt Gray
- Ground: Gander Green Lane
- League Two: 8th
- FA Cup: Second round (eliminated by Bristol Rovers)
- EFL Cup: First round (eliminated by Cardiff City)
- EFL Trophy: Runners-up (eliminated by Rotherham United)
- Top goalscorer: League: David Ajiboye; Isaac Olaofe; Alistair Smith (8); All: Isaac Olaofe; Alistair Smith (9)
- Highest home attendance: 4,010 v Bradford City, 30 April 2022
- Lowest home attendance: 770 v Stevenage, 30 November 2021
- Average home league attendance: 3,089
- Biggest win: 4–0 v Carlisle United, 25 September 2021
- Biggest defeat: 1–4 v Leyton Orient, 20 November 2021; 1–4 v Bradford City, 30 April 2022
Home colours	Away colours	Third colours

The 2021–22 Sutton United F.C. season was the 95th edition of competitive association football and first season in the English Football League played by Sutton United Football Club, a professional football club based in Sutton in the London Borough of Sutton, England. They won, and were therefore promoted from, the National League in 2020–21 to earn entry into the EFL League Two. The club competed in this season's edition of the FA Cup; and for the first time, in the EFL Cup and EFL Trophy. The season ran from 1 July 2021 to 30 June 2022.

== Background ==
The 2020–21 season was Matt Gray's second full season as Sutton United manager, having taken over the role in May 2019. Sutton finished the season as champions of the 2020–21 National League to gain promotion out of non-League football for the first time in the club's 123-year history, and into League Two, the fourth tier of the English football league system.

As EFL rules require that all matches have to be played on grass surfaces, Sutton began work on tearing up their artificial pitch at Gander Green Lane in order to meet the requirements on 31 May 2020.

== Pre-season ==
Sutton United announced they would have friendlies against Brentford XI, Chesham United, Maidstone United, Haringey Borough, Aldershot Town, Dartford and Barnet as part of the club's pre-season preparations.

On 12 July, it was announced the scheduled friendly against Brentford XI was off due to players coming into contact with an individual testing positive for COVID-19, the club confirmed they would travel to face Chesham United instead. On 15 July, the upcoming game against Maidstone United was called off due to a positive COVID-19 test result in the Sutton squad.

13 July 2021 Friendly	Sutton United	P–P	Brentford XI	Farnborough
19:45 BST				Stadium: Cherrywood Road
Note: Match postponed due to COVID-19 positive result guideline

13 July 2021 Friendly	Chesham United	0–2	Sutton United	Chesham
19:30 BST		Report	Ajiboye 55'; Dundas 85'	Stadium: The Meadow; Attendance: 140

17 July 2021 Friendly	Maidstone United	P–P	Sutton United	Maidstone
15:00 BST				Stadium: Gallagher Stadium
Note: Match postponed due to COVID-19 positive result guideline

20 July 2021 Friendly	Haringey Borough	0–4	Sutton United	Tottenham
19:45 BST		Report	Trialist 10'; Boldewijn 19'; Kouassi 73'; Randall 80'	Stadium: Coles Park

22 July 2021 Friendly	Sutton United	6–0	Brighton & Hove Albion U23	Lancing
10:00 BST	Ajiboye 8', 30'; Randall 38'; Smith 62'; Wilson 68'; Goodliffe 77'	Report		Stadium: Culver Road; Attendance: 0 (Behind-closed-doors)

24 July 2021 Friendly	Sutton United	1–2	Aldershot Town	Farnborough
17:00 BST	Bugiel 4'	Report	Andrews 59'; Whittingham 83' (pen.)	Stadium: Cherrywood Road; Attendance: 269

27 July 2021 Friendly	Dartford	3–1	Sutton United	Dartford
19:45 BST	Robinson 15' (pen.); Allen 55'; Roberts 73'	Report	Kouassi 67'	Stadium: Princes Park; Referee: Tim Robinson

31 July 2021 Friendly	Sutton United	2–1	Barnet	Farnborough
12:00 BST	Bugiel 45'; Milsom 67' (pen.)	Report	Marriott 44'	Stadium: Cherrywood Road

== Competitions ==
=== Overall Record ===
Competition	First match	Last match	Starting round	Final position	Record							
Competition	First match	Last match	Starting round	Final position	Pld	W	D	L	GF	GA	GD	Win %
League Two	7 August 2021	7 May 2022	Matchday 1	8th	46	22	10	14	69	53	+16	47.83
FA Cup	6 November 2021	4 December 2021	First round	Second round	2	1	0	1	2	2	+0	50.00
EFL Cup	10 August 2021	10 August 2021	First round	First round	1	0	0	1	2	3	−1	0.00
EFL Trophy	31 August 2021	3 April 2022	Group stage	Runners-up	8	5	2	1	12	7	+5	62.50
Total					57	28	12	17	85	65	+20	49.12

Last updated: 7 May 2022
Source: Competitions

=== League Two ===
==== League table ====
Pos	Team	Pld	W	D	L	GF	GA	GD	Pts	Promotion, qualification or relegation
5	Port Vale (O, P)	46	22	12	12	67	46	+21	78	Qualification for League Two play-offs
6	Swindon Town	46	22	11	13	77	54	+23	77	Qualification for League Two play-offs
7	Mansfield Town	46	22	11	13	67	52	+15	77	Qualification for League Two play-offs
8	Sutton United	46	22	10	14	69	53	+16	76	
9	Tranmere Rovers	46	21	12	13	53	40	+13	75	
10	Salford City	46	19	13	14	60	46	+14	70	
11	Newport County	46	19	12	15	67	58	+9	69	

Source: EFL Official Website
Rules for classification: 1) Points; 2) Goal difference; 3) Number of goals scored; 4) Head-to-head results; 5) Wins; 6) Away goals; 7) Penalty points (sec 9.5); 8) 12-point sending off offences
(O) Play-off winners; (P) Promoted

==== Results summary ====
Overall								Home						Away					
Pld	W	D	L	GF	GA	GD	Pts	W	D	L	GF	GA	GD	W	D	L	GF	GA	GD
46	22	10	14	69	53	+16	76	14	5	4	38	20	+18	8	5	10	31	33	−2

Last updated: 7 May 2022.

==== Results by matchday ====
Matchday	1	2	3	4	5	6	7	8	9	10	11	12	13	14	15	16	17	18	19	20	21	22	23	24	25	26	27	28	29	30	31	32	33	34	35	36	37	38	39	40	41	42	43	44	45	46
Ground	A	A	A	H	H	H	A	H	A	H	A	H	A	A	H	A	A	H	H	A	A	H	H	A	H	H	A	H	H	H	A	A	H	H	A	A	H	A	A	H	A	H	A	H	H	A
Result	L	D	D	L	W	W	L	W	W	W	W	L	L	W	L	W	L	W	W	L	D	W	W	D	W	D	W	D	D	D	L	D	W	W	L	L	D	W	L	W	W	W	L	W	L	W
Position	18	16	21	24	23	15	18	14	11	7	5	8	10	6	9	8	9	7	6	6	6	3	3	5	3	3	4	3	4	5	5	5	5	3	7	8	9	8	10	10	7	6	7	7	8	8

Updated to match(es) played on 7 May 2022. Source:
A = Away; H = Home; W = Win; D = Draw; L = Loss

==== Matches ====
Sutton's full league fixture were released on 24 June 2021.

7 August 2021 1	Forest Green Rovers	2–1	Sutton United	Nailsworth
15:00 BST	Bernard (yellow card) 20'; Moore-Taylor (yellow card) 26'; Stevens 30'; Adams 90+1'; Matt (yellow card) 90+4'	Report	Bugiel 69'	Stadium: The New Lawn; Attendance: 1,883; Referee: James Bell

14 August 2021 2	Salford City	0–0	Sutton United	Salford
15:00 BST	McAleny (yellow card) 42'; Lowe (yellow card) 61'; Elliott (yellow card) 90+3'	Report	Davis (yellow card) 62'	Stadium: Peninsula Stadium; Attendance: 1,406; Referee: Sam Barrott

21 August 2021 3	Scunthorpe United	1–1	Sutton United	Scunthorpe
15:00 BST	Thompson (yellow card) 32'; Scrimshaw 51', (yellow card) 77'; Perry (yellow card) 71'	Report	Wilson 84'; Bugiel (yellow card) 90'	Stadium: Glanford Park; Attendance: 2,429; Referee: Ross Joyce

28 August 2021 4	Sutton United	1–2	Oldham Athletic	Sutton
15:00 BST	Ajiboye (yellow card) 51', (goal) 62'; Eastmond (yellow card) 80'	Report	Diarra (yellow card) 39'; Piergianni (yellow card) 73', (goal) 88'; Luamba (yellow card) 90+5', (goal) 90+6'	Stadium: Gander Green Lane; Attendance: 3,262; Referee: Darren Drysdale

11 September 2021 5	Sutton United	2–1	Stevenage	Sutton
15:00 BST	John (yellow card) 38'; Bennett 58', 63' (pen.); Kizzi (yellow card) 89'	Report	Taylor (yellow card) 47'; List 55'; Vancooten (red card) 61'; Coker (yellow card) 90+4'	Stadium: Gander Green Lane; Attendance: 2,427; Referee: Trevor Kettle

14 September 2021 6	Sutton United	1–0	Hartlepool United	Sutton
19:45 BST	Goodliffe 25'; Bugiel (yellow card) 74'; Milsom (yellow card) 90+1'	Report	Featherstone (yellow card) 70'; Byrne (yellow card) 74'; Cullen (yellow card) 86'	Stadium: Gander Green Lane; Attendance: 2,484; Referee: Simon Hooper

18 September 2021 7	Exeter City	2–0	Sutton United	Exeter
15:00 BST	Goodliffe 68' (o.g.); Nombe 84'	Report		Stadium: St James Park; Attendance: 4,511; Referee: Scott Oldham

25 September 2021 8	Sutton United	4–0	Carlisle United	Sutton
15:00 BST	Wilson 3'; Smith 37', 70'; Goodliffe (yellow card) 57'; Ajiboye 81'	Report	Mampala (yellow card) 56' (yellow-red card) 71'; Dickenson (yellow card) 56'	Stadium: Gander Green Lane; Attendance: 2,873; Referee: Simon Mather

2 October 2021 9	Northampton Town	0–2	Sutton United	Northampton
15:00 BST	McWilliams (yellow card) 37'; Rose (yellow card) 38'; Koiki (yellow card) 71'; Flores (yellow card) 85'	Report	Kizzi 41'; Wilson 46'; Bouzanis (yellow card) 89'	Stadium: Sixfields Stadium; Attendance: 4,789; Referee: Rebecca Welch

9 October 2021 10	Sutton United	4–3	Port Vale	Sutton
15:00 BST	Milsom 36'; Garrity 69' (o.g.); Randall 87'; Rowe 90+1'; Bouzanis (yellow card) 90+7'	Report	Smith 21', (yellow card) 42'; Proctor 28'; Gibbons (yellow card) 47'; Worrall (yellow card) 67'; Conlon 78'; Jones (yellow card) 81'; Lloyd (yellow card) 90'	Stadium: Gander Green Lane; Attendance: 3,905; Referee: Declan Bourne

16 October 2021 11	Crawley Town	0–1	Sutton United	Crawley
15:00 BST	Dallison (yellow card) 19'; Nichols (penalty missed) 75'; Francillette (yellow card) 83'	Report	John (yellow card) 75'; Milsom (yellow card) 75'; Bouzanis (yellow card) 76'; Olaofe 84'; Boldewijn (yellow card) 90+1'	Stadium: The People's Pension Stadium; Attendance: 3,572; Referee: Tom Nield

19 October 2021 12	Sutton United	1–2	Swindon Town	Sutton
19:45 BST	John (yellow card) 24'; Beautyman 39' (pen.); Bugiel (yellow card) 60'; Barden (yellow card) 90+6'	Report	Reed 17'; Williams 31'; McKirdy (yellow card) 87'; Crichlow (yellow card) 90+1'	Stadium: Gander Green Lane; Attendance: 3,443; Referee: Chris Sarginson

23 October 2021 13	Rochdale	3–2	Sutton United	Rochdale
15:00 BST	Newby 23'; Kelly 66'; Morley 90+5'	Report	Bennett (red card) 45+2'; Olaofe 82'; Smith 90'	Stadium: Spotland Stadium; Attendance: 2,248; Referee: Paul Howard

26 October 2021 14	Colchester United	1–3	Sutton United	Colchester
19:45 BST	Sears 2'; Hannant (yellow card) 5'; Tovide (red card) 27'; Smith (yellow card) 57'; Chilvers (yellow card) 82'	Report	Ajiboye 12'; Milsom 28' (pen.); Goodliffe (yellow card) 55', (goal) 61'	Stadium: JobServe Community Stadium; Attendance: 3,013; Referee: Bobby Madley

30 October 2021 15	Sutton United	0–1	Walsall	Sutton
15:00 BST		Report	Labadie (yellow card) 43'; Shade 66'; Perry (yellow card) 90+2'	Stadium: Gander Green Lane; Attendance: 3,319; Referee: Carl Boyeson

13 November 2021 16	Tranmere Rovers	0–1	Sutton United	Birkenhead
15:00 GMT	Spearing (yellow card) 2'; Knight-Percival (yellow card) 89'	Report	Goodliffe (yellow card) 66'; Olaofe 71'; Bennett (yellow card) 82'	Stadium: Prenton Park; Attendance: 6,452; Referee: Will Finnie

20 November 2021 17	Leyton Orient	4–1	Sutton United	Leyton
15:00 GMT	Archibald 30'; Smith 46', 82'; Ogie (yellow card) 68'; James 90+4'	Report	Olaofe 18'; Ajiboye (yellow card) 77'; Eastmond (yellow card) 88'	Stadium: Breyer Group Stadium; Attendance: 5,840; Referee: Scott Oldham

23 November 2021 18	Sutton United	2–0	Mansfield Town	Sutton
19:45 GMT	John 4'; Bugiel 69'	Report	Hawkins (yellow card) 5'; Stirk (yellow card) 32'; Clarke (yellow card) 72'	Stadium: Gander Green Lane; Attendance: 2,497; Referee: David Rock

27 November 2021 19	Sutton United	1–0	Barrow	Sutton
15:00 GMT	Goodliffe (yellow card) 13'; Ajiboye 16'; Bugiel (yellow card) 51'; Davis (yellow card) 82'; Bouzanis (yellow card) 89'	Report	Kay (yellow card) 45'; Banks (yellow card) 74'	Stadium: Gander Green Lane; Attendance: 2,678; Referee: Brett Huxtable

7 December 2021 20	Newport County	3–2	Sutton United	Newport
19:45 GMT	Collins 53'; Baker-Richardson 64'; Dolan 90+3' (pen.)	Report	Ajiboye 24', 42'; Eastmond (red card) 34'; Barden (yellow card) 72'	Stadium: Rodney Parade; Attendance: 3,368; Referee: Oliver Langford

11 December 2021 21	Bradford City	2–2	Sutton United	Bradford
15:00 GMT	Oscar Threlkeld (yellow card) 24'; Canavan (red card) 31'; Robinson 34'; Sutton (yellow card) 62'; Angol 81'; Cooke (yellow card) 88'	Report	Milsom 32' (pen.); John (yellow card) 41'; Smith 76'	Stadium: Utilita Energy Stadium; Attendance: 14,658; Referee: Peter Wright

18 December 2021 22	Sutton United	1–0	Harrogate Town	Sutton
15:00 GMT	Wilson 30'; Barden (yellow card) 32'; Bugiel (yellow card) 63'	Report		Stadium: Gander Green Lane; Attendance: 2,720; Referee: Josh Smith

1 January 2022 23	Sutton United	2–1	Exeter City	Sutton
15:00 GMT	Bugiel 8'; Barden (yellow card) 64'; Milsom 89' (pen.)	Report	Dieng 9'	Stadium: Gander Green Lane; Attendance: 3,278; Referee: Alan Young

15 January 2022 24	Stevenage	3–3	Sutton United	Stevenage
15:00 GMT	Norris 34'; Reid 39', 64'; Prosser (yellow card) 55'	Report	Smith 58'; Milsom 66' (pen.); Bennett 90+8'	Stadium: Lamex Stadium; Attendance: 2,961; Referee: Paul Howard

18 January 2022 25	Sutton United	3–2	Colchester United	Sutton
19:45 GMT	Olaofe 9', 64'; Smith (yellow card) 45+2'; Eastmond (yellow card) 57'; Randall 90+2'	Report	Edwards 3'; Dallison (yellow card) 21'; Sears 44' (pen.), (yellow card) 58'; Huws (yellow card) 75'; Smith (yellow card) 77'	Stadium: Gander Green Lane; Attendance: 2,542; Referee: Robert Lewis

22 January 2022 26	Sutton United	0–0	Northampton Town	Sutton
15:00 GMT	Eastmond (red card) 74'	Report	Lewis (yellow card) 56'; Horsfall (yellow card) 79'; Rose (yellow card) 80'	Stadium: Gander Green Lane; Attendance: 3,588; Referee: John Busby

29 January 2022 27	Carlisle United	0–2	Sutton United	Carlisle
15:00 GMT	Omotoye (yellow card) 52'	Report	Olaofe 23', (yellow card) 67'; Ajiboye 31'; Milsom (yellow card) 55'	Stadium: Brunton Park; Attendance: 4,399; Referee: Darren Handley

5 February 2022 28	Sutton United	1–1	Bristol Rovers	Sutton
15:00 GMT	Kizzi (yellow card) 7'; Bennett 19'; Bouzanis (yellow card) 31'; Davis (yellow card) 51'; Milsom (yellow card) 90+3'	Report	Connolly (yellow card) 18'; Evans 85' (pen.)	Stadium: Gander Green Lane; Attendance: 3,394; Referee: Bobby Madley

8 February 2022 29	Sutton United	0–0	Salford City	Sutton
19:45 GMT	John (yellow card) 52'; Milsom (yellow card) 84'	Report	Ndaba (yellow card) 86'	Stadium: Gander Green Lane; Attendance: 2,491; Referee: Lee Swabey

12 February 2022 30	Sutton United	1–1	Forest Green Rovers	Sutton
15:00 GMT	Davis 37'; Ajiboye (yellow card) 74'	Report	Wilson 60'	Stadium: Gander Green Lane; Attendance: 3,314; Referee: James Bell

15 February 2022 31	Bristol Rovers	2–0	Sutton United	Horfield
19:45 GMT	Anderson 4', (yellow card) 57'; Coutts (penalty missed) 45+2'; Collins 46'	Report	Davis (yellow card) 12'; Kizzi (yellow card) 56'; Rowe (yellow card) 65'	Stadium: Memorial Stadium; Attendance: 6,700; Referee: Christopher Pollard

19 February 2022 32	Hartlepool United	1–1	Sutton United	Hartlepool
15:00 GMT	Crawford 51'	Report	Kizzi 3'	Stadium: Suit Direct Stadium; Attendance: 5,487; Referee: Andrew Kitchen

26 February 2022 33	Sutton United	4–1	Scunthorpe United	Sutton
15:00 GMT	Milsom 29' (pen.); Randall 30', 62'; Kizzi 39'	Report	Nuttall (yellow card) 8'; Beautyman 79' (o.g.)	Stadium: Gander Green Lane; Attendance: 2,870; Referee: Simon Mather

5 March 2022 34	Sutton United	3–0	Rochdale	Sutton
15:00 GMT	Boldewijn 12', 45+2'; Kizzi 57'; Milsom (yellow card) 78'	Report	O'Connell (yellow card) 22'; Dorsett (yellow card) 41'	Stadium: Gander Green Lane; Attendance: 2,874; Referee: Ben Speedie

12 March 2022 35	Walsall	1–0	Sutton United	Bescot
15:00 GMT	Wilkinson 33' (pen.); Daniels (yellow card) 75'	Report	Milsom (yellow card) 62'; Wyatt (yellow card) 82'; Eastmond (yellow card) 88'	Stadium: Banks's Stadium; Attendance: 5,801; Referee: Scott Oldham

15 March 2022 36	Swindon Town	2–1	Sutton United	Swindon
19:45 GMT	Davison 14', (yellow card) 70'; Reed (yellow card) 35' (yellow-red card) 90+3'; McKirdy 49'; Iandolo (yellow card) 63'	Report	Kizzi 28'; Boldewijn (yellow card) 49'; Rowe (yellow card) 85'	Stadium: The County Ground; Attendance: 8,243; Referee: Carl Boyeson

19 March 2022 37	Sutton United	1–1	Tranmere Rovers	Sutton
15:00 GMT	Goodliffe 15'	Report	Nevitt (yellow card) 47'; Hawkes 68'	Stadium: Gander Green Lane; Attendance: 3,366; Referee: Will Finnie

22 March 2022 38	Oldham Athletic	1–3	Sutton United	Oldham
19:45 GMT	Sutton 81'	Report	Korboa 20', 49'; Beautyman 77' (pen.)	Stadium: Boundary Park; Attendance: 4,624; Referee: Marc Edwards

26 March 2022 39	Port Vale	2–0	Sutton United	Burslem
15:00 GMT	Wilson 7'; Proctor 23', (yellow card) 70'; Walker (yellow card) 53'	Report	John (yellow card) 66'	Stadium: Vale Park; Attendance: 6,362; Referee: Martin Coy

9 April 2022 40	Sutton United	1–0	Leyton Orient	Sutton
15:00 BST	Kizzi 21'; Bugiel (yellow card) 59'	Report	Kyprianou (yellow card) 41'; Archibald (yellow card) 85'; Khan (yellow card) 90+5'	Stadium: Gander Green Lane; Attendance: 3,152; Referee: Robert Lewis

15 April 2022 41	Mansfield Town	2–3	Sutton United	Mansfield
15:00 BST	Quinn (yellow card) 57'; Goodliffe 78' (o.g.); Longstaff 90+7'	Report	Bugiel 9'; Ajiboye 49'; Bennett 80'	Stadium: One Call Stadium; Attendance: 6,134; Referee: Neil Hair

18 April 2022 42	Sutton United	1–0	Newport County	Sutton
15:00 BST	Milsom 45' (pen.), (yellow card) 80'; Bennett (yellow card) 47'; Bouzanis (yellow card) 73'; John (yellow card) 85'; Boldewijn (yellow card) 90+1'	Report	Norman (yellow card) 80'; Dolan (yellow card) 90+4'	Stadium: Gander Green Lane; Attendance: 3,447; Referee: Ollie Yates

23 April 2022 43	Barrow	1–0	Sutton United	Barrow-in-Furness
15:00 BST	Kay (yellow card) 32' (yellow-red card) 68'; Rooney 68'; Brown (yellow card) 75'	Report	Ajiboye (yellow card) 67'; Milsom (penalty missed) 76'	Stadium: The Dune Hotel Stadium; Attendance: 3,019; Referee: Ben Toner

26 April 2022 44	Sutton United	3–0	Crawley Town	Sutton
19:45 BST	Smith 4', 85'; Bennett 7'; Barden (yellow card) 35'	Report	Davies (yellow card) 34'; Oteh (yellow card) 52'; Nadesan (yellow card) 90+2'	Stadium: Gander Green Lane; Attendance: 3,109; Referee: Sam Allison

30 April 2022 45	Sutton United	1–4	Bradford City	Sutton
15:00 BST	Smith 55'; Bugiel (yellow card) 45+3'; Goodliffe (yellow card) 71'	Report	Vernam 16', 77'; Angol (yellow card) 52'; Songo'o (yellow card) 54', (goal) 85'; Hendrie (yellow card) 64'; Cook 90+7'	Stadium: Gander Green Lane; Attendance: 4,010; Referee: Declan Bourne

7 May 2022 46	Harrogate Town	0–2	Sutton United	Harrogate
15:00 BST		Report	Eastmond 8'; Kizzi (yellow card) 63'; Olaofe 78'	Stadium: The EnviroVent Stadium; Attendance: 2,484; Referee: Oliver Langford

=== FA Cup ===
Sutton United were drawn away to Hayes & Yeading United in the first round.

6 November 2021 First round	Hayes & Yeading United	0–1	Sutton United	Hayes
15:00 GMT	Odelusi (yellow card) 43'; Emmanuel (yellow card) 60'	Report	Milsom (yellow card) 37'; Goodliffe (yellow card) 46'; Randall 71'	Stadium: Skyex Stadium; Attendance: 1,201; Referee: Sam Allison

4 December 2021 Second round	Bristol Rovers	2–1	Sutton United	Horfield
15:00 GMT	Evans (yellow card) 28'; Taylor (yellow card) 45+1'; Collins 57' (pen.); Anderton 60'	Report	Davis (yellow card) 22'; Randall 52'; Eastmond (yellow card) 72'	Stadium: Memorial Stadium; Attendance: 4,456; Referee: Darren Drysdale

=== EFL Cup ===
U's were drawn away to Cardiff City in the first round.

10 August 2021 First round	Cardiff City	3–2	Sutton United	Cardiff
19:00 BST	Watkins 44', 50'; Murphy 84'	Report	Wilson 4'; Milsom (yellow card) 21'; Eastmond (yellow card) 55'; Rowe 90'	Stadium: Cardiff City Stadium; Attendance: 3500; Referee: Josh Smith

=== EFL Trophy ===
United were drawn into the group stages alongside AFC Wimbledon, Crystal Palace U21s and Portsmouth. The group stage fixtures were announced on 15 July.

Pos	Div	Team	Pld	W	PW	PL	L	GF	GA	GD	Pts	Qualification
1	L2	Sutton United	3	3	0	0	0	6	0	+6	9	Advance to Round 2
2	L1	Portsmouth	3	1	0	0	2	6	7	−1	3	Advance to Round 2
3	L1	AFC Wimbledon	3	1	0	0	2	5	6	−1	3	
4	ACA	Crystal Palace U21	3	1	0	0	2	2	6	−4	3	

Source: EFL.com

31 August 2021 Group stage	Sutton United	3–0	Crystal Palace U21	Sutton
19:30 BST	Sho-Silva 31'; Smith 52'; Boldewijn (yellow card) 54'; Korboa (yellow card) 76', (goal) 81'	Report	D. Boateng (yellow card) 82'; Hannam (yellow card) 85'	Stadium: Gander Green Lane; Attendance: 1,504; Referee: David Rock

12 October 2021 Group stage	Portsmouth	0–2	Sutton United	Portsmouth
19:45 BST	Jacobs (yellow card) 86'	Report	Olaofe 55'; John 71'; Eastmond (yellow card) 83'	Stadium: Fratton Park; Attendance: 2,490; Referee: Lee Swabey

9 November 2021 Group stage	Sutton United	1–0	AFC Wimbledon	Sutton
19:45 GMT	Wilson 47'	Report	Guinness-Walker (yellow card) 71'	Stadium: Gander Green Lane; Attendance: 2,458; Referee: Neil Hair

30 November 2021 Second round	Sutton United	0–0 (4–3 p)	Stevenage	Sutton
19:45 GMT	Eastmond (yellow card) 90+8'	Report	Lines (yellow card) 33'; Vancooten (yellow card) 38'; Marshall (yellow card) 81'	Stadium: Gander Green Lane; Attendance: 770; Referee: Sam Purkiss
	Penalties
	Eastmond (penalty scored); Davis (penalty scored); Milsom (penalty scored); Korboa (penalty missed); Olaofe (penalty missed); Goodliffe (penalty scored)		Norris (penalty scored); Reeves (penalty scored); Reid (penalty scored); List (penalty missed); Wildin (penalty missed); Osborne (penalty missed)

4 January 2022 Third round	Sutton United	2–1	Colchester United	Sutton
19:45 GMT	Turner 7' (o.g.); Wilson 52'; Kizzi (yellow card) 57'	Report	Dobra (yellow card) 34'; Sears 45'; Coxe (yellow card) 57'; Sarpong-Wiredu (yellow card) 57'	Stadium: Gander Green Lane; Attendance: 977; Referee: Charles Breakspear

25 January 2022 Quarter-final	Sutton United	1–0	Harrogate Town	Sutton
19:45 GMT	Davis (yellow card) 4'; Smith (yellow card) 74'; Eastmond 80'	Report	Armstrong (yellow card) 4'; Page (yellow card) 29'; McArdle (yellow card) 71'	Stadium: Gander Green Lane; Attendance: 1,499; Referee: Christopher Pollard

8 March 2022 Semi-final	Wigan Athletic	1–1 (6–7 p)	Sutton United	Wigan
19:45 GMT	McClean 39'; Magennis (yellow card) 46'; Shinnie (yellow card) 65'	Report	Randall 29'; Ajiboye (yellow card) 69'	Stadium: DW Stadium; Attendance: 6,541; Referee: James Bell
	Penalties
	Power (penalty missed); Shinnie (penalty scored); Keane (penalty scored); McClean (penalty scored); Magennis (penalty scored); Edwards (penalty scored); McGrath (penalty scored); Darikwa (penalty missed)		Eastmond (penalty scored); Beautyman (penalty missed); Milsom (penalty scored); Goodliffe (penalty scored); Bennett (penalty scored); Boldewijn (penalty scored); Bouzanis (penalty scored); John (penalty scored)
Note: Live on Sky Sports

3 April 2022 Final	Rotherham United	4–2 (a.e.t.)	Sutton United	London
15:00 BST	Wiles (yellow card) 15', (goal) 42'; Osei-Tutu 90+6'; Ogbene 96'; Ihiekwe 112'	Report	Wilson 30'; Eastmond 48'; John (yellow card) 86'; Kizzi (yellow card) 92'	Stadium: Wembley Stadium; Attendance: 30,688; Referee: Seb Stockbridge
Note: Live on Sky Sports

== Transfers ==
=== Transfers in ===
Date	Position	Nationality	Name	From	Fee	Ref.
1 July 2021	RB	(England)	Joe Kizzi	(England) Bromley	Free transfer	
1 July 2021	LW	(England)	Ricky Korboa	(England) Northampton Town	Free transfer	
1 July 2021	CM	(England)	Alistair Smith	(England) Altrincham	Undisclosed	
1 July 2021	CF	(England)	Donovan Wilson	(England) Bath City	Undisclosed	
6 July 2021	RW	(Netherlands)	Enzio Boldewijn	(England) Notts County	Free transfer	
9 July 2021	CF	(England)	Richie Bennett	(England) Stockport County	Free transfer	
1 October 2021	GK	(England)	Harry Palmer	Unattached	Free transfer	
14 January 2022	GK	(England)	Stuart Nelson	(England) Dorking Wanderers	Free transfer	

=== Loans in ===
Date from	Position	Nationality	Name	From	Date until	Ref.
31 August 2021	CF	(England)	Isaac Olaofe	(England) Millwall	End of season	

=== Transfers out ===
Date	Position	Nationality	Name	To	Fee	Ref.
30 June 2021	AM	(England)	Wayne Brown	Retired	Released	
30 June 2021	RW	(Antigua and Barbuda)	Rhys Browne	(England) Wealdstone	Released	
30 June 2021	CF	(Australia)	Callum Kealy	(England) Dorking Wanderers	Released	
30 June 2021	RB	(England)	Jude Mason	(England) Merstham	Released	
30 June 2021	LM	(England)	Joash Nembhard	(England) Hemel Hempstead Town	Released	
30 June 2021	CB	(England)	Bradley Pearce	(England) Welling United	Released	
30 June 2021	RB	(England)	Aaron Simpson	(England) Hemel Hempstead Town	Released	
31 October 2021	GK	(England)	Harry Palmer	(England) Maidenhead United	Released	
31 January 2022	CF	(England)	Tobi Sho-Silva	(England) Carlisle United	Undisclosed	

=== Loans out ===
Start date	Position	Nationality	Name	To	Date until	Ref.
28 August 2021	CM	(England)	Adam Lovatt	(England) Tonbridge Angels	26 September 2021	
24 September 2021	CF	(England)	Kylian Kouassi	(England) Hampton & Richmond Borough	24 October 2021	
21 October 2021	CM	(England)	Adam Lovatt	(England) Tonbridge Angels	14 March 2022	
26 October 2021	CF	(England)	Kylian Kouassi	(England) Chesham United	4 March 2022	
2 November 2021	GK	(Poland)	Filip Chalupniczak	(England) Tooting & Mitcham United	1 December 2021	
15 January 2022	GK	(England)	Brad House	(England) Carshalton Athletic	31 January 2022	
3 March 2022	DF	(England)	Roman Charles-Cook	(England) South Park	31 March 2022	

== Squad statistics ==
=== Appearances ===
As of match played 7 May 2022

No.	Pos.	Nat.	Name	EFL League Two		EFL Cup		EFL Trophy		FA Cup		Total	
No.	Pos.	Nat.	Name	Apps	Starts	Apps	Starts	Apps	Starts	Apps	Starts	Apps	Starts
1	GK	(Australia)	Dean Bouzanis	44	44	1	1	6	5	2	2	53	52
2	DF	(England)	Jonathan Barden	21	18	1	1	3	3	1	1	26	23
3	DF	(England)	Ben Wyatt	16	13	0	0	7	6	1	1	24	20
4	DF	(England)	Coby Rowe	15	12	1	1	4	3	1	1	21	17
5	DF	(England)	Ben Goodliffe	43	43	1	1	7	7	2	2	53	53
6	DF	(England)	Louis John	36	36	0	0	6	6	1	1	43	43
7	FW	(England)	David Ajiboye	43	42	1	1	4	2	2	2	50	47
8	MF	(England)	Kenny Davis	20	12	1	1	4	3	1	1	26	17
9	FW	(Lebanon)	Omar Bugiel	39	27	1	1	4	2	2	2	46	32
10	MF	(England)	Harry Beautyman	19	12	1	1	3	3	0	0	23	16
11	MF	(England)	Will Randall	28	18	0	0	5	5	2	2	35	25
12	GK	(England)	Stuart Nelson	2	2	0	0	0	0	0	0	2	2
13	GK	(England)	Brad House	0	0	0	0	3	3	0	0	3	3
14	MF	(England)	Craig Dundas	4	0	0	0	1	0	0	0	5	0
15	MF	(England)	Craig Eastmond	31	31	1	1	6	4	1	1	39	37
16	FW	(England)	Isaac Olaofe	27	18	0	0	5	2	2	2	34	22
17	FW	(England)	Tobi Sho-Silva	7	4	0	0	4	2	1	0	12	6
18	MF	(England)	Adam Lovatt	3	3	0	0	0	0	0	0	3	3
19	FW	(England)	Ricky Korboa	14	3	0	0	5	4	1	0	20	7
20	MF	(Netherlands)	Enzio Boldewijn	39	27	1	0	7	4	2	0	49	31
22	DF	(England)	Joe Kizzi	32	31	0	0	7	7	1	1	40	39
23	GK	(England)	Harry Palmer	0	0	0	0	0	0	0	0	0	0
24	DF	(England)	Robert Milsom	38	37	1	1	5	2	2	2	46	42
25	FW	(England)	Donovan Wilson	38	23	1	1	7	6	2	0	48	30
26	FW	(England)	Richie Bennett	38	22	1	0	8	5	1	0	48	27
27	FW	(England)	Kylian Kouassi	4	0	0	0	0	0	0	0	4	0
29	MF	(England)	Alistair Smith	33	28	1	0	5	4	1	1	40	33
32	GK	(Poland)	Filip Chalupniczak	0	0	0	0	0	0	0	0	0	0
Total				46		1		8		2		57	

=== Goals ===
As of match played 7 May 2022

Rank	Pos.	No.	Player	EFL League Two	EFL Cup	EFL Trophy	FA Cup	Total
1	FW	16	(England) Isaac Olaofe	8	0	1	0	9
1	MF	29	(England) Alistair Smith	8	0	1	0	9
3	FW	7	(England) David Ajiboye	8	0	0	0	8
3	FW	25	(England) Donovan Wilson	4	1	3	0	8
5	MF	11	(England) Will Randall	4	0	1	2	7
5	DF	24	(England) Robert Milsom	7	0	0	0	7
7	DF	22	(England) Joe Kizzi	6	0	0	0	6
7	FW	26	(England) Richie Bennett	6	0	0	0	6
9	FW	9	(Lebanon) Omar Bugiel	4	0	0	0	4
10	DF	5	(England) Ben Goodliffe	3	0	0	0	3
10	MF	15	(England) Craig Eastmond	1	0	2	0	3
10	FW	19	(England) Ricky Korboa	2	0	1	0	3
13	DF	4	(England) Coby Rowe	1	1	0	0	2
13	DF	6	(England) Louis John	1	0	1	0	2
13	MF	10	(England) Harry Beautyman	2	0	0	0	2
13	MF	20	(Netherlands) Enzio Boldewijn	2	0	0	0	2
17	MF	8	(England) Kenny Davis	1	0	0	0	1
17	FW	17	(England) Tobi Sho-Silva	0	0	1	0	1
	Own goals			1	0	1	0	2
	Total			69	2	12	2	85

=== Assists ===
As of match played 7 May 2022

Rank	Pos.	No.	Player	EFL League Two	EFL Cup	EFL Trophy	FA Cup	Total
1	DF	24	(England) Robert Milsom	7	0	0	0	7
1	FW	25	(England) Donovan Wilson	4	0	1	2	7
3	FW	7	(England) David Ajiboye	5	1	0	0	6
3	MF	20	(Netherlands) Enzio Boldewijn	5	0	1	0	6
3	FW	26	(England) Richie Bennett	5	0	1	0	6
6	FW	9	(Lebanon) Omar Bugiel	4	0	0	0	4
7	DF	22	(England) Joe Kizzi	3	0	0	0	3
8	MF	8	(England) Kenny Davis	2	0	0	0	2
8	MF	29	(England) Alistair Smith	1	0	1	0	2
10	GK	1	(Australia) Dean Bouzanis	1	0	0	0	1
10	DF	5	(England) Ben Goodliffe	0	0	1	0	1
10	DF	6	(England) Louis John	1	0	0	0	1
10	MF	10	(England) Harry Beautyman	1	0	0	0	1
10	MF	11	(England) Will Randall	0	0	1	0	1
10	MF	15	(England) Craig Eastmond	1	0	0	0	1
10	FW	19	(England) Ricky Korboa	0	0	1	0	1
	Total			40	1	7	2	50

=== Clean sheets ===
As of match played 7 May 2022

No.	Player	EFL League Two	EFL Cup	EFL Trophy	FA Cup	Total
1	(Australia) Dean Bouzanis	17	0	3	1	21
13	(England) Brad House	0	0	3	0	3
	Total	17	0	5 (Note: Both Bouzanis and House featured in the game vs Stevenage so are both credited with a clean sheet.)	1	23

=== Disciplinary record ===
As of match played 7 May 2022

No.	Pos.	Name	EFL League Two		EFL Cup		EFL Trophy		FA Cup		Total	
No.	Pos.	Name	Booked	Sent off (straight red)	Booked	Sent off (straight red)	Booked	Sent off (straight red)	Booked	Sent off (straight red)	Booked	Sent off (straight red)
1	GK	(Australia) Dean Bouzanis	6	0	0	0	0	0	0	0	6	0
2	DF	(England) Jonathan Barden	5	0	0	0	0	0	0	0	5	0
3	DF	(England) Ben Wyatt	1	0	0	0	0	0	0	0	1	0
4	DF	(England) Coby Rowe	2	0	0	0	0	0	0	0	2	0
5	DF	(England) Ben Goodliffe	5	0	0	0	0	0	1	0	6	0
6	DF	(England) Louis John	7	0	0	0	1	0	0	0	8	0
7	FW	(England) David Ajiboye	4	0	0	0	1	0	0	0	5	0
8	MF	(England) Kenny Davis	4	0	0	0	1	0	1	0	6	0
9	MF	(Lebanon) Omar Bugiel	7	0	0	0	0	0	0	0	7	0
15	MF	(England) Craig Eastmond	4	2	1	0	2	0	1	0	8	2
16	FW	(England) Isaac Olaofe	1	0	0	0	0	0	0	0	1	0
19	FW	(England) Ricky Korboa	0	0	0	0	1	0	0	0	1	0
20	MF	(Netherlands) Enzio Boldewijn	3	0	0	0	1	0	0	0	4	0
22	DF	(England) Joe Kizzi	4	0	0	0	2	0	0	0	6	0
24	DF	(England) Robert Milsom	7	0	1	0	0	0	1	0	9	0
26	FW	(England) Richie Bennett	2	1	0	0	0	0	0	0	2	1
29	MF	(England) Alistair Smith	1	0	0	0	1	0	0	0	2	0
Total			63	3	2	0	10	0	4	0	79	3
