= Richie Bennett =

English footballer (born 1991)

Personal information
- Full name: Richard Thomas Bennett
- Date of birth: 23 March 1991 (age 35)
- Place of birth: Oldham, England
- Height: 6 ft 4 in (1.93 m)
- Position: Forward

Team information
- Current team: Spennymoor Town

Youth career
- Heyside Juniors
- 2001–2006: Oldham Athletic

Senior career*
| Years | Team | Apps | (Gls) |
| 2007–2008 | Springhead | | |
| 2008–2013 | Curzon Ashton | | |
| 2013–2014 | Mossley | | |
| 2014–2016 | Northwich Victoria | | |
| 2016–2017 | Barrow | 43 | (15) |
| 2017–2019 | Carlisle United | 59 | (10) |
| 2019 | → Morecambe (loan) | 16 | (5) |
| 2019–2020 | Port Vale | 26 | (6) |
| 2020–2021 | Stockport County | 32 | (3) |
| 2021 | → Hartlepool United (loan) | 4 | (5) |
| 2021–2022 | Sutton United | 38 | (6) |
| 2022–2023 | Barrow | 13 | (0) |
| 2023 | → Scunthorpe United (loan) | 9 | (1) |
| 2023–2024 | Scunthorpe United | 3 | (0) |
| 2023–2024 | → Southport (loan) | 26 | (8) |
| 2024–2026 | Scarborough Athletic | 78 | (14) |
| 2026– | Spennymoor Town | 0 | (0) |
- * Club domestic league appearances and goals as of 20:42, 23 June 2026 (UTC)

Richard Thomas Bennett (born 23 March 1991) is an English professional footballer who plays as a forward for National League North club Spennymoor Town.

Having left the youth team at Oldham Athletic at the age of 15, he began his career in non-League football with Springhead, Curzon Ashton, Mossley, Northwich Victoria and Barrow. His 22 goals in 53 appearances for Barrow during the 2016–17 season earned him a move to Carlisle United in July 2017, meaning he first entered the Football League at the age of 26. He was loaned out to Morecambe in January 2019 and left Carlisle for Port Vale in June 2019. He was sold to Stockport County in March 2020. He briefly joined Hartlepool United on loan in April 2021 and signed with Football League newcomers Sutton United three months later. He played for Sutton on the losing side in the 2022 EFL Trophy final and was sold to Barrow in June 2022. From Barrow, he was loaned out to Scunthorpe United in March 2023 before joining on a permanent deal six months later. From Scunthorpe, he was loaned out to Southport in November 2023. He signed with Scarborough Athletic in June 2024 and moved on to Spennymoor Town after two years.

== Career ==
=== Early career ===
Bennett joined the youth team at Oldham Athletic at the age of ten and left Boundary Park five years later. He went on to make his debut in the Manchester League for Springhead at the age of 16. He moved on to Curzon Ashton the next year, before being signed to Northern Premier League Division One North side Mossley in November 2013. He scored eight goals in 22 games during the second half of the 2013–14 season. He signed with Northwich Victoria, where he was christened "Richie" by manager Jim Gannon, having previously only been known as Richard or Rich. He scored 44 goals in two seasons with the "Vics" and helped them to win the 2014 Cheshire Senior Cup. During his time playing as an amateur and semi-professional he worked in customer sales for Marks & Spencer, in a call centre and also a spell as a care assistant working with dementia sufferers. He also became a father at the age of 17.

=== Barrow ===
On 17 May 2016, Bennett signed a two-year contract at National League club Barrow. It was reported that he opted to go to Holker Street ahead of competition from League Two clubs. He went on to score 22 goals in 53 games as Paul Cox's "Bluebirds" finished the 2016–17 season in seventh-position, just missing out on the play-offs.

=== Carlisle United ===
On 25 July 2017, 26-year-old Bennett signed for Football League side Carlisle United for an undisclosed fee (later reported to be £50,000) on a two-year contract. Bennett stated that "I think I'm ready for the step up... I've still got a lot to prove, a lot to learn but I'm more than willing to get my head down and do it." On 30 September, he was one of three players sent off in a 1–0 defeat at Crawley Town; he was shown a straight red card for elbowing defender Josh Yorwerth. It took him 15 games before he scored for the "Cumbrians", but credited the support of his teammates and manager Keith Curle in helping him to break his scoring duck. His first goal for the club came on 28 October, in a 2–2 draw at Chesterfield. On 4 November, he scored a brace in a 3–2 FA Cup victory over former club Oldham. He ended the 2017–18 season with eight goals in 47 appearances.

Having been limited to 13 league starts by new manager John Sheridan, Bennett signed for Morecambe on loan for the rest of the 2018–19 season on 17 January 2019; "Shrimps" boss Jim Bentley admitted he had been monitoring the player for some years. David Holdsworth, director of football at the "Blues", said that Carlisle would monitor his progress and still retained the option of extending his contract at Brunton Park in the summer. He scored five goals in 16 games at the Globe Arena, however, was not retained at the end of the season by new Carlisle manager Steven Pressley.

=== Port Vale ===
On 21 June 2019, Bennett signed a two-year contract with League Two side Port Vale. Manager John Askey said that he hoped having Bennett available to him would take pressure off star striker Tom Pope. He scored his first goal for the "Valiants" on 17 August, three minutes after coming on for Pope in a 1–1 draw at Salford City. Three days later he was given his first start for the club and this time scored after four minutes in what ended as a 2–1 victory over Forest Green Rovers at Vale Park. He lost his first-team spot in late-November to Pope and then Mark Cullen, before scoring a brace in a 3–1 home win over Exeter City on 28 January in what was his second league start in two months; despite this achievement Bennett admitted that "it probably wasn't my best performance. I have a lot to improve, I know that myself". He left the club mid-way through the 2019–20 season after scoring seven goals from 30 games.

=== Stockport County ===
On 12 March 2020, Bennett signed a two-and-a-half-year contract with Stockport County after being sold for an undisclosed fee, who were just outside the National League play-offs under former Northwich manager Jim Gannon. He found himself out of the team after Simon Rusk replaced Gannon as the manager in January 2021.

On 1 April 2021, Bennett signed on loan for National League rivals Hartlepool United until the end of the 2020–21 season. Bennett made his debut the following day as a substitute in a 2–1 win against Dagenham & Redbridge. Bennett scored his first goal for Hartlepool in the following match as a substitute in a 2–2 draw at Boreham Wood. Bennett earned a start for the next match against Notts County and scored his second goal for Hartlepool in a 2–0 win. The following week, Bennett scored a hat-trick in a 7–2 victory at Wealdstone. He was recalled to Stockport on 28 April. He played for Stockport against Hartlepool in the play-off semi-finals and had a late header saved in a 1–0 defeat at Edgeley Park. Hartlepool went on to win the play-off final and Bennett had his contract with Stockport cancelled in June.

=== Sutton United ===
On 9 July 2021, Bennett signed a contract of undisclosed length with newly-promoted League Two club Sutton United. He scored both the "U's" goals in a 2–1 win over Stevenage at Gander Green Lane on 11 September, which was Sutton's first victory in the English Football League. On 23 October, he was sent off for a stamp on Rochdale's Jake Beesley in a 3–2 away defeat. Matt Gray's "U's" finished the League Two campaign one place outside the play-offs, with Bennett scoring six league goals from 22 starts and 16 substitute appearances. He also played in all eight games of Sutton's run to the final of the EFL Trophy at Wembley Stadium, and scored a penalty in the shoot-out victory over Wigan Athletic in the semi-finals. He played in the final, coming on as an 82nd-minute substitute for Omar Bugiel with Sutton leading 2–1; however, Rotherham United equalised deep into stoppage time and won the match 4–2 in extra-time.

=== Return to Barrow ===
On 27 June 2022, Bennett returned to Barrow – now in League Two and managed by Pete Wild – on a two-year contract after being signed for an undisclosed fee. However, he picked up an injury during pre-season. He was sidelined until November. Bennett left Barrow by mutual consent on 31 July 2023.

=== Scunthorpe United ===
On 2 March 2023, Bennett joined National League club Scunthorpe United on loan until the end of the 2022–23 season. Scunthorpe had recently undergone a takeover and signed eleven new players. He scored one goal in nine games, his sole goal coming in a 2–0 win over Altrincham at Glanford Park, as Scunthorpe were relegated to the National League North.

On 4 September 2023, Bennett signed a contract with Scunthorpe to run until the end of the 2023–24 season. He said that he had a point to prove at the club and felt that there was a different vibe to the club. He made three appearances without scoring, though did score a goal in a further appearance against Buxton which was expunged following the game's abandonment. On 7 November 2023, he joined National League North rivals Southport on a three-month loan deal. He scored eight goals in 28 league games for Southport in the 2023–24 campaign. Scunthorpe released him at the end of the 2023–24 season.

=== Scarborough Athletic ===
On 25 June 2024, Bennett joined National League North side Scarborough Athletic. He scored 10 goals in 45 appearances across the 2024–25 campaign. He scored five goals from 26 league games in the 2025–26 campaign, including a stoppage-time equaliser against Southport. He was a substitute in the play-off quarter-final defeat to Buxton.

=== Spennymoor Town ===
On 23 June 2026, Bennett agreed to join fellow National League North club Spennymoor Town.

== Style of play ==
Standing at 1.93 m (6 ft 4 in), Bennett is a hard-working forward who is good in the air. Describing his own game, he said that "I would like to say I'm aggressive, quick - one of them annoying strikers that doesn't really give you time to think about what you are doing on the ball".

== Career statistics ==
As of match played 28 April 2026

Appearances and goals by club, season and competition
| Club | Season | League | | | FA Cup | | League Cup | | Other | | Total | |
| Club | Season | Division | Apps | Goals | Apps | Goals | Apps | Goals | Apps | Goals | Apps | Goals |
|---|---|---|---|---|---|---|---|---|---|---|---|---|
| Barrow | 2016–17 | National League | 43 | 15 | 5 | 2 | — | | 5 (Note: Appearances in the FA Trophy) | 5 | 53 | 22 |
| Carlisle United | 2017–18 | League Two | 38 | 6 | 5 | 2 | 2 | 0 | 2 (Note: Appearances in the EFL Trophy) | 0 | 47 | 8 |
| Carlisle United | 2018–19 | League Two | 21 | 4 | 2 | 0 | 1 | 0 | 2 | 0 | 26 | 4 |
| Carlisle United | Total | | 59 | 10 | 7 | 2 | 3 | 0 | 4 | 0 | 73 | 12 |
| Morecambe (loan) | 2018–19 | League Two | 16 | 5 | 0 | 0 | 0 | 0 | 0 | 0 | 16 | 5 |
| Port Vale | 2019–20 | League Two | 26 | 6 | 1 | 0 | 1 | 0 | 2 | 1 | 30 | 7 |
| Stockport County | 2019–20 | National League | 1 | 0 | 0 | 0 | — | | 0 | 0 | 1 | 0 |
| Stockport County | 2020–21 | National League | 31 | 3 | 3 | 1 | — | | 2 (Note: 1 appearances in the FA Trophy and 1 appearance in the play-offs) | 0 | 36 | 4 |
| Stockport County | Total | | 32 | 3 | 3 | 1 | 0 | 0 | 2 | 0 | 37 | 4 |
| Hartlepool United (loan) | 2020–21 | National League | 4 | 5 | 0 | 0 | — | | 0 | 0 | 4 | 5 |
| Sutton United | 2021–22 | League Two | 38 | 6 | 1 | 0 | 1 | 0 | 8 | 0 | 48 | 6 |
| Barrow | 2022–23 | League Two | 13 | 0 | 1 | 0 | 0 | 0 | 0 | 0 | 14 | 0 |
| Scunthorpe United (loan) | 2022–23 | National League | 9 | 1 | 0 | 0 | — | | 0 | 0 | 9 | 1 |
| Scunthorpe United | 2023–24 | National League North | 3 | 0 | 2 | 0 | — | | 0 | 0 | 5 | 0 |
| Scunthorpe United | Total | | 12 | 1 | 2 | 0 | — | | 0 | 0 | 14 | 1 |
| Southport (loan) | 2023–24 | National League North | 26 | 8 | 0 | 0 | — | | 2 | 1 | 28 | 9 |
| Scarborough Athletic | 2024–25 | National League North | 42 | 9 | 2 | 1 | — | | 1 | 0 | 45 | 10 |
| Scarborough Athletic | 2025–26 | National League North | 36 | 5 | 0 | 0 | — | | 1 (Note: Appearances in the play-offs) | 0 | 37 | 5 |
| Scarborough Athletic | Total | | 78 | 14 | 2 | 1 | — | | 2 | 0 | 82 | 15 |
| Spennymoor Town | 2026–27 | National League North | 0 | 0 | 0 | 0 | — | | 0 | 0 | 0 | 0 |
| Career total | | | 347 | 73 | 22 | 6 | 5 | 0 | 25 | 7 | 408 | 87 |

== Honours ==
Northwich Victoria

- Cheshire Senior Cup: 2013–14

Sutton United

- EFL Trophy runner-up: 2021–22
