= Tanto Olaofe =

English footballer (born 1999)

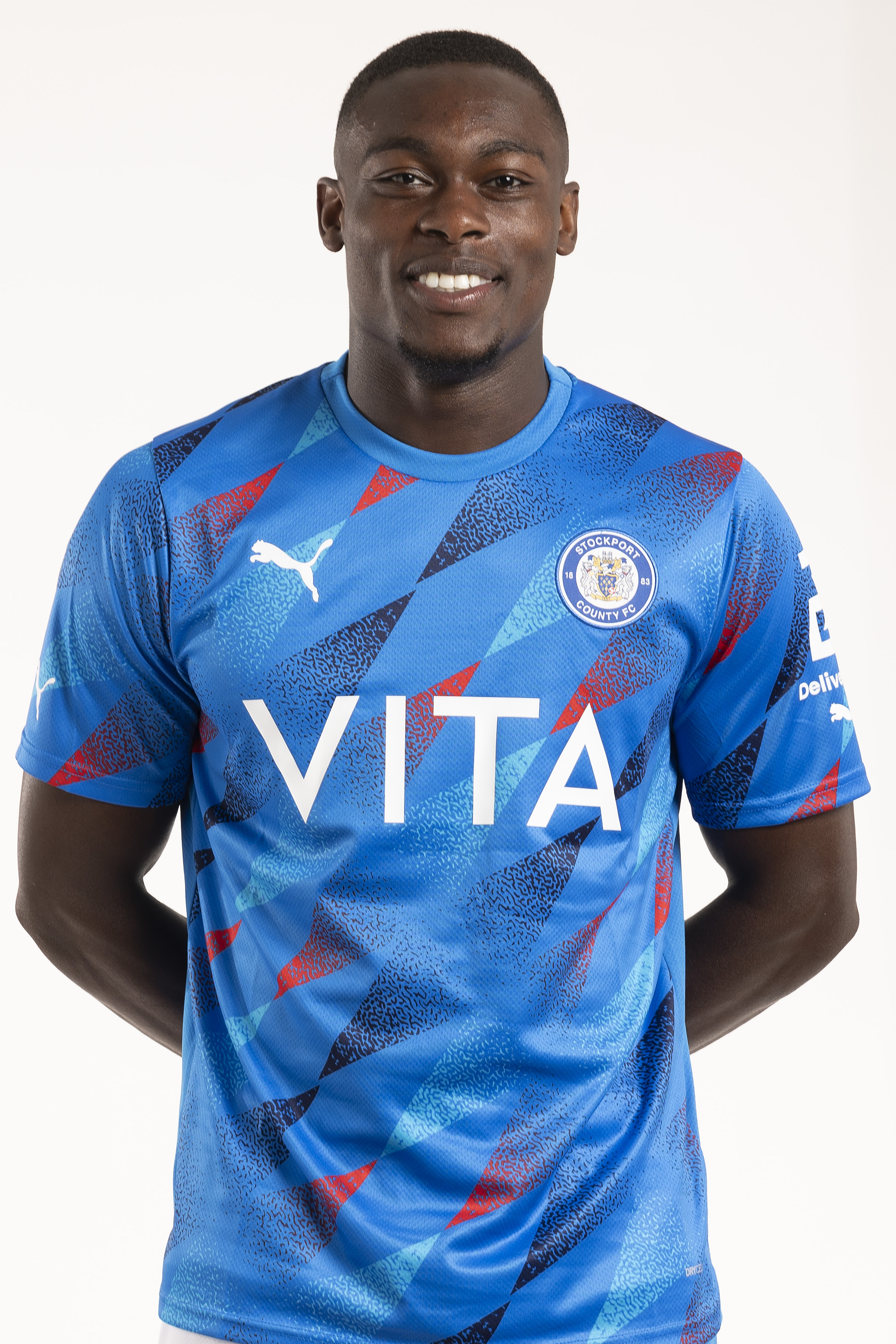
- Olaofe with Stockport County in 2023.

Personal information
- Full name: Isaac Tanitoluwaloba Aduraoluwatimileyin Olaofe
- Date of birth: 21 November 1999 (age 26)
- Place of birth: Lewisham, England
- Height: 1.81 m (5 ft 11 in)
- Position: Striker

Team information
- Current team: Lincoln City (on loan from Charlton Athletic)
- Number: 19

Youth career
- –2019: Millwall

Senior career*
Years	Team	Apps	(Gls)
2019–2023	Millwall	2	(0)
2020	→ Sutton United (loan)	5	(1)
2020	→ St Johnstone (loan)	2	(0)
2020–2021	→ Sutton United (loan)	37	(14)
2021–2022	→ Sutton United (loan)	27	(8)
2023–2025	Stockport County	103	(30)
2025–	Charlton Athletic	22	(1)
2026	→ Stockport County (loan)	16	(1)
2026–	→ Lincoln City (loan)	6	(0)
- * Club domestic league appearances and goals as of 17:10, 7 November 2026 (UTC)

Isaac Tanitoluwaloba Aduraoluwatimileyin "Tanto" Olaofe (born 21 November 1999) is an English professional footballer who plays for EFL Championship club Lincoln City on loan from EFL Championship club Charlton Athletic as a striker.

Olaofe came through the youth system of Millwall, and spent time on loan with Sutton United and St Johnstone. He returned to Sutton on loan for the 2020–21 season, and was the club's top scorer that season with 16 goals, helping them win the league to be promoted to the Football League for the first time in their history. He was once again loaned to Sutton the following season. After making his Millwall debut in 2022, he signed for Stockport County in 2023. He was the top scorer for Stockport with 20 goals in the 2023–24 season as they were crowned champions of League Two.

== Career ==
=== Millwall ===
==== Early career ====
Raised in Dartford, Olaofe played county football for Kent. He had trials with Crystal Palace and Millwall. He signed for Millwall after impressing in his six-week trial, joining at the age of 14. He signed his first professional contract in May 2018. He extended his contract in May 2019.

==== 2019–20 season: First loan to Sutton United ====
He moved on loan to Sutton United in February 2020. He made his debut on 22 February in a 2–2 home draw with Barrow, and scored his first goal in his final game for the club, a 1–1 draw with Hartlepool United on 14 March. He scored 1 goal in 5 league games for the club, although the season was ended prematurely due to the COVID-19 pandemic.

==== Loan to St Johnstone ====
After extending his contract with Millwall in June 2020, he moved on loan to Scottish club St Johnstone in July. He said he was looking forward to working with St Johnstone manager Callum Davidson, who had previously been the assistant manager at Millwall. He made his debut for the club in a 0–3 defeat away at Rangers on 12 August. On 5 October, Olaofe's loan was terminated by mutual consent, having only made two substitute appearances for the club, 41 minutes in total. St Johnstone captain Liam Gordon later said of him, "Maybe we didn't get the best out of Tanto but I can't speak highly enough of him. He's a great lad – a proper, genuine boy who gave everything. It's just wasn't the right place at the right time."

==== Second loan to Sutton United ====
Later that month he returned to Sutton United on loan, initially until January 2021. On 10 October, he made his debut in a 1–0 win over Weymouth. He scored his first goals back at the club with a hat-trick in a 5–1 defeat of King's Lynn Town on 14 November 2020. His loan was extended to the end of the season in January 2021, after scoring 5 goals in 14 games for Sutton. At the end of the season, Sutton were crowned champions and promoted to the Football League for the first time in their history. Olaofe was Sutton's top scorer for the season with 16 goals in all competitions, and won the Young Player of the Year award.

==== 2021–22 season: Third loan to Sutton United ====
In June 2021, Olaofe signed a new contract with Millwall. He returned to Sutton United on loan for the rest of the season on 31 August 2021. After sustaining a hip flexor injury in pre-season, he made his Football League debut on 25 September in a 4–0 win over Carlisle United. He scored his first goal in his second loan spell in a 2–0 victory over Portsmouth in the EFL Trophy on 12 October. His first league goal came on 16 October, scoring the winner in a 1–0 win over Crawley Town. He made a substitute appearance in the 2022 EFL Trophy final against Rotherham United on 3 April 2022, which ended in a 4–2 defeat. He ended the season with 9 goals in 34 appearances in all competitions. In total, he made 80 appearances and scored 26 times across his three loans for Sutton.

==== 2022–23 season: Final season with Millwall ====
In the summer of 2022, Olaofe was set to join League One club Barnsley on loan. However, Barnsley were unable to complete the paperwork in time, and the move fell through. He signed a new contract on 5 September 2022, stating he would remain at Millwall for the "foreseeable future". He made his competitive debut for Millwall on 2 August in a 1–0 defeat against Cambridge United in the EFL Cup. He made his Championship debut on 13 August in a 3–2 win over Coventry City. By December, Olaofe had only made two Championship appearances for Millwall and, with competition from Tom Bradshaw and Benik Afobe, manager Gary Rowett said Olaofe was free to leave in January 2023.

=== Stockport County ===
==== 2022–23 season ====
On 30 December 2022, it was announced that Olaofe would join Stockport County once the transfer window opened on 1 January 2023, for an undisclosed fee. He made his debut on 8 January in an FA Cup match against Walsall, which Stockport lost 2–1. His league debut came on 14 January in a 2–0 win over Northampton Town. On 11 February, he scored his first goal in a 3–1 win over Harrogate Town. At the end of the season, Olaofe started the play-off final on 28 May against Carlisle United, but lost 5–4 on penalties. He finished his debut season with Stockport with 3 goals in 22 appearances.

==== 2023–24 season ====
Olaofe started the season opener, a 1–0 defeat to Gillingham on 5 August 2023. His first goal of the season came on 15 August, in a 1–1 draw against Bradford City. On 23 September 2023, he scored his first Football League hat-trick in a 5–0 win over Wrexham. This also made him the first Stockport player to score a hat-trick in the Football League since Carl Baker in 2009. At the end of the season, Stockport were announced as League Two champions. Olaofe was Stockport's top scorer with 20 goals in 43 games, which also made him the first Stockport player since Luke Beckett in the 2002–03 season to score 20 goals in a Football League campaign.

==== 2024–25 season ====
Olaofe extended his contract by three years in June 2024. After going through a minor surgery, he scored in his first appearance of the season on 17 August in a 3–0 win over Blackpool.

=== Charlton Athletic ===
==== 2025–26 season and loan to Stockport ====
On 2 July 2025, Olaofe joined newly promoted Championship side Charlton Athletic on a three-year deal, for an undisclosed transfer fee. On 28 January 2026, Olaofe re-joined Stockport County on loan for the remainder of the season.

==== Loan to Lincoln City ====
On 7 August 2026, Olaofe joined Lincoln City on a season-long loan. He made his debut the following day, replacing Freddie Draper in the EFL Cup against Derby County.

== Personal life ==
Born in England, Olaofe is of Nigerian descent. He attended Wilmington Grammar School. While at Millwall, Olaofe was also studying for a Business Management degree at the Open University. His nickname "Tanto" is an abbreviated form of his middle name.

== Career statistics ==
As of match played 7 November 2026

Appearances and goals by club, season and competition
Club	Season	League			FA Cup		EFL Cup		Other		Total	
Club	Season	Division	Apps	Goals	Apps	Goals	Apps	Goals	Apps	Goals	Apps	Goals
Millwall	2019–20	Championship	0	0	0	0	0	0	—		0	0
Millwall	2020–21	Championship	0	0	0	0	0	0	—		0	0
Millwall	2021–22	Championship	0	0	0	0	0	0	—		0	0
Millwall	2022–23	Championship	2	0	0	0	1	0	—		3	0
Millwall	Total		2	0	0	0	1	0	0	0	3	0
Sutton United (loan)	2019–20	National League	5	1	0	0	—		—		5	1
St Johnstone (loan)	2020–21	Scottish Premiership	2	0	0	0	0	0	0	0	2	0
Sutton United (loan)	2020–21	National League	37	14	1	0	—		3 (Note: Appearances in FA Trophy)	2	41	16
Sutton United (loan)	2021–22	League Two	27	8	2	0	0	0	5 (Note: Appearances in EFL Trophy)	1	34	9
Stockport County	2022–23	League Two	18	2	1	0	0	0	3 (Note: Appearances in EFL League Two play-offs)	1	22	3
Stockport County	2023–24	League Two	43	20	2	0	1	0	2	1	48	21
Stockport County	2024–25	League One	42	9	3	1	0	0	6 (Note: Four appearances and two goals in the EFL Trophy and two appearances and one goal in the EFL League One play-offs)	3	51	13
Stockport County	Total		103	31	6	1	1	0	11	5	121	37
Charlton Athletic	2025–26	Championship	22	1	1	0	2	0	—		25	1
Charlton Athletic	2026–27	Championship	0	0	0	0	0	0	—		0	0
Charlton Athletic	Total		22	1	1	0	2	0	0	0	25	1
Stockport County (loan)	2025–26	League One	16	1	0	0	0	0	6 (Note: Three appearances in the EFL Trophy and three appearances in the EFL League One play-offs)	0	22	1
Lincoln City (loan)	2026–27	Championship	6	0	0	0	2	1	—		8	1
Career total			220	55	10	1	6	1	25	8	261	65

== Honours ==
Sutton United

- National League: 2020–21
- EFL Trophy runner-up: 2021–22

Stockport County

- EFL League Two: 2023–24
- EFL Trophy runner-up: 2025–26

Individual

- Sutton United Young Player of the Season: 2020–21
