= Ben Wyatt (footballer) =

English footballer (born 1996)

Personal information
- Full name: Benjamin Thomas Wyatt
- Date of birth: 4 February 1996 (age 30)
- Place of birth: Norwich, England
- Height: 5 ft 8 in (1.73 m)
- Position: Left back

Youth career
- 2006–2014: Norwich City
- 2014–2015: Ipswich Town

Senior career*
Years	Team	Apps	(Gls)
2015–2016	Maldon & Tiptree	41	(2)
2016–2017	Colchester United	0	(0)
2016–2017	→ Concord Rangers (loan)	23	(0)
2017–2018	Braintree Town	37	(3)
2018–2019	St Albans City	39	(2)
2019–2022	Sutton United	52	(0)
2022–2023	Torquay United	30	(0)
2023–2024	St Albans City	9	(0)
- * Club domestic league appearances and goals as of 16:09, 29 March 2025 (UTC)

Benjamin Thomas Wyatt (born 4 February 1996) is an English professional footballer who plays as a left back.

== Career ==
After playing youth football with Norwich City and Ipswich Town, and in non-league for Maldon & Tiptree, Wyatt signed a one-year professional contract with Colchester United in May 2016. He moved on loan to Concord Rangers in October 2016. He moved to Braintree Town in August 2017. After playing for St Albans City, he signed for Sutton United in September 2019. He was released by the club upon the expiry of his contract on 30 June 2022.

In July 2022 he signed for Torquay United. He was released at the end of the 2022–23 season following their relegation.

On 19 July 2023, Wyatt agreed to return to St Albans City following his release from Torquay.

== Career statistics ==
As of match played 9 September 2023

Appearances and goals by club, season and competition
Club	Season	League			FA Cup		EFL Cup		Other		Total	
Club	Season	Division	Apps	Goals	Apps	Goals	Apps	Goals	Apps	Goals	Apps	Goals
Maldon & Tiptree	2015–16	Isthmian League Division One North	41	2	1	0	—		3 (Note: Two appearances in the Alan Turvey Trophy, one in the FA Trophy)	0	45	2
Colchester United	2016–17	League Two	0	0	0	0	0	0	0	0	0	0
Concord Rangers (loan)	2016–17	National League South	23	0	—		—		0	0	23	0
Braintree Town	2017–18	National League South	37	3	1	0	—		6 (Note: Three appearances in the FA Trophy, three appearances in the National League South play-offs)	0	44	3
St Albans City	2018–19	National League South	39	2	3	0	—		2 (Note: Appearances in the FA Trophy)	0	44	2
Sutton United	2019–20	National League	19	0	0	0	—		1	0	20	0
Sutton United	2020–21	National League	17	0	1	0	—		2	0	20	0
Sutton United	2021–22	League Two	16	0	1	0	0	0	7 (Note: Appearances in EFL Trophy)	0	24	0
Sutton United	Total		52	0	2	0	0	0	10	0	64	0
Torquay United	2022–23	National League	30	0	1	0	—		2	0	33	0
St Albans City	2023–24	National League South	9	0	1	0	—		0	0	10	0
Career total			231	7	9	0	0	0	23	0	263	7

== Honours ==
Norwich City

- FA Youth Cup: 2012-13

Sutton United

- EFL Trophy runner-up: 2021–22
