= Joe Kizzi =

English footballer (born 1993)

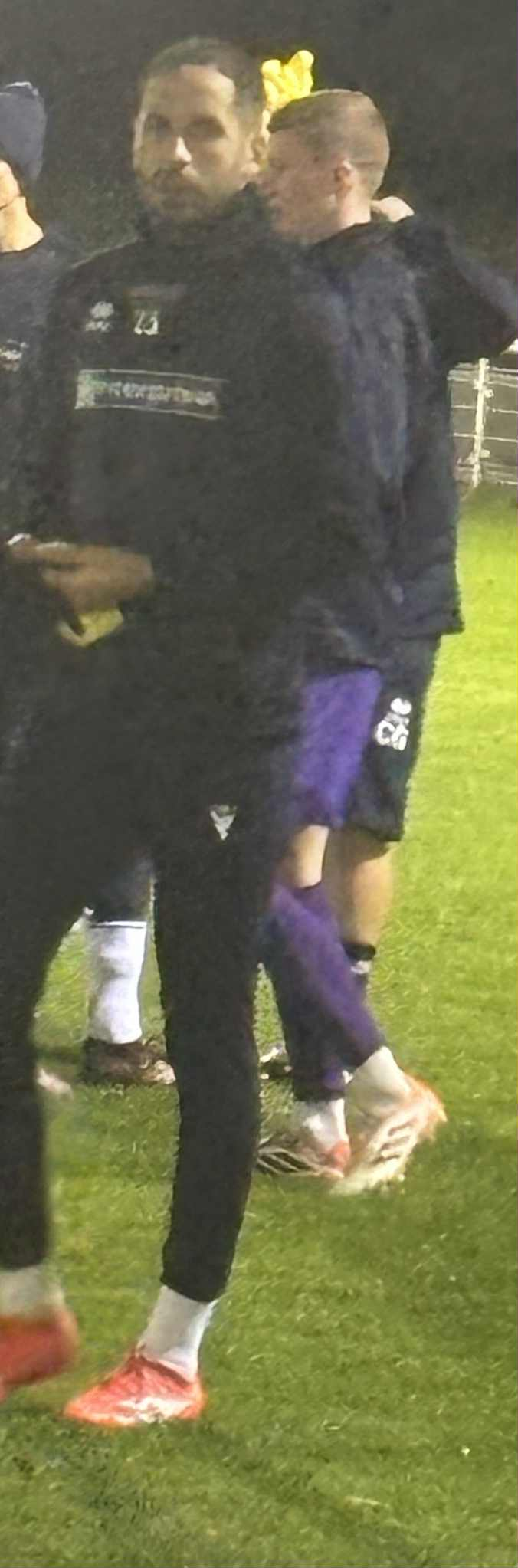
- Kizzi in 2025.

Personal information
- Full name: Joseph Mohamed Kizzi
- Date of birth: 24 June 1993 (age 33)
- Place of birth: Enfield, England
- Height: 6 ft 4 in (1.93 m)
- Position: Defender

Team information
- Current team: Hornchurch
- Number: 12

Youth career
- Ridgeway Rovers

Senior career*
Years	Team	Apps	(Gls)
- Eton Manor
–2014	Enfield 1893		
2014–2015	Waltham Abbey	40	(3)
2015–2017	Cheshunt	77	(6)
2017	Wingate & Finchley	10	(0)
2017–2019	Billericay Town	71	(6)
2019–2021	Bromley	75	(11)
2021–2024	Sutton United	124	(8)
2024–2026	Barnet	31	(2)
2025	→ Enfield Town (loan)	2	(0)
2026–	Hornchurch	0	(0)
- * Club domestic league appearances and goals as of 12:23, 16 June 2026 (UTC)

Joseph Kizzi (born 24 June 1993) is an English professional footballer who plays as a defender for Hornchurch.

== Career ==
Born in London, Kizzi played youth football for Ridgeway Rovers and non-league football for Eton Manor, Enfield 1893, Waltham Abbey, Cheshunt, Wingate & Finchley, Billericay Town and Bromley, before signing for newly promoted Football League club Sutton United on 1 July 2021.

On 24 May 2024, he joined Barnet for an undisclosed fee on a three-year contract. On 22 November 2025, he joined Enfield Town on a one month loan. On 1 January 2026, Kizzi scored his first goals for Barnet, scoring both goals in a 2-1 win at home to Crawley Town.

On 16 June 2026, Kizzi left Barnet by mutual consent. On the same day, he signed for Hornchurch.

== Honours ==
Sutton United

- EFL Trophy runner-up: 2021–22

Barnet

- National League: 2024–25

Individual

- National League South Team of the Year: 2018–19
- Sutton United Players' Player of the Year: 2021–22
- Sutton United Supporters' Club Player of the Year: 2022–23
