= Chiedozie Ogbene =

Irish footballer (born 1997)

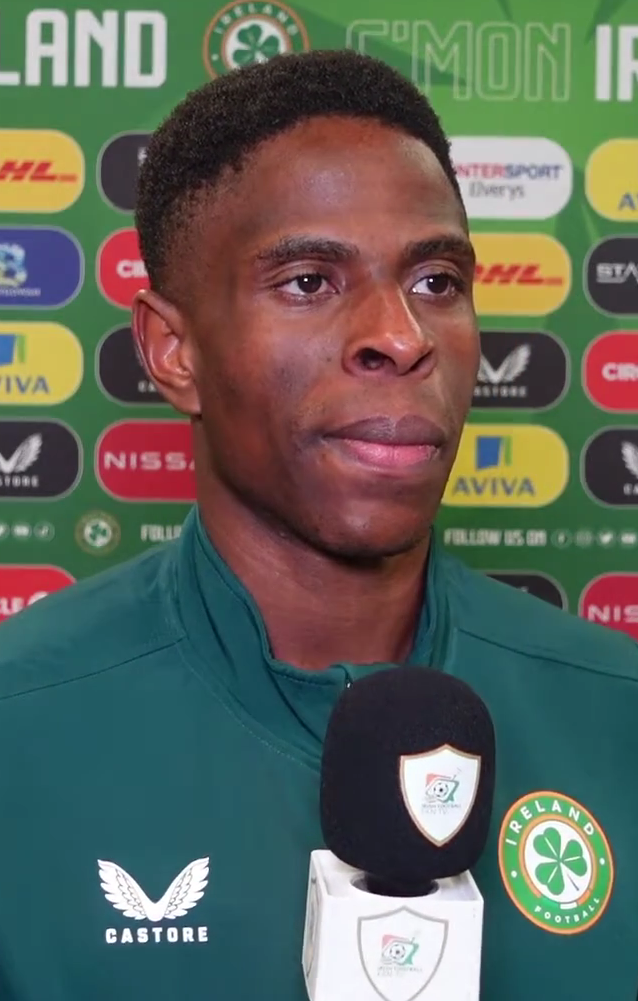
- Ogbene with the Republic of Ireland in 2023

Personal information
- Full name: Chiedozie Somkelechukwu Ogbene
- Date of birth: 1 May 1997 (age 29)
- Place of birth: Lagos, Nigeria
- Height: 1.81 m (5 ft 11 in)
- Position: Winger

Team information
- Current team: Lincoln City (on loan from Ipswich Town)
- Number: 27

Youth career
- Tramore Athletic
- College Corinthians
- Kilreen Celtic
- Everton

Senior career*
Years	Team	Apps	(Gls)
2015–2016	Cork City	9	(3)
2017	Limerick	32	(8)
2018–2019	Brentford	6	(0)
2018–2019	→ Exeter City (loan)	14	(0)
2019–2023	Rotherham United	120	(12)
2023–2024	Luton Town	34	(4)
2024–	Ipswich Town	7	(0)
2025–2026	→ Sheffield United (loan)	13	(1)
2026–	→ Lincoln City (loan)	11	(0)

International career^{‡}
2021–	Republic of Ireland	40	(5)
- * Club domestic league appearances and goals as of 17:05, 21 November 2026 (UTC) ‡ National team caps and goals as of 21:45, 17 November 2026 (UTC)

Chiedozie Somkelechukwu Ogbene (born 1 May 1997) is an Irish professional footballer who plays as a winger for EFL Championship club Lincoln City on loan from Premier League club Ipswich Town, and the Republic of Ireland national team.

Ogbene began his career in Ireland with Cork City and Limerick, before transferring to Brentford in 2018. After a loan spell with Exeter City he moved to Rotherham United in 2019, and then to Luton Town in 2023. After one season with Luton, he signed for Ipswich Town. In 2021, he became the first ever African-born player to represent the Republic of Ireland at senior level.

== Early and personal life ==
Born in Lagos, Nigeria, Ogbene moved with his family (including two brothers and two sisters) to Ireland in 2005, after his father got a job in the country, rejecting an offer of a job in Florida in the process. He grew up in the Grange area of Cork. He attended Bunscoil Chríost Rí as his primary school and Coláiste Chríost Rí as his secondary school. He is a supporter of Liverpool.

== Club career ==
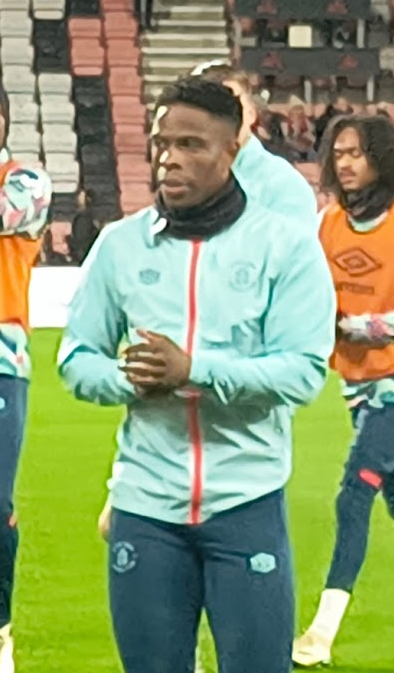
Ogbene with Luton in 2024

Ogbene played Gaelic football for Nemo Rangers and association football for Munster Senior League clubs Tramore Athletic, College Corinthians, Kilreen Celtic and Everton. He scored 1–2 and was awarded man of the match in an under-21 final for Nemo Rangers in 2015, his last appearance for the club. He quit Gaelic football to pursue his dream of playing Premier League football.

He signed for Cork City in August 2015. He won the Enda McGuill Cup with their under-19 youth team, and the 2016 FAI Cup with their senior team.

He signed for fellow League of Ireland club Limerick in January 2017. He was nominated three times for the League of Ireland Player of the Month award.

In November 2017 he was linked with a transfer to English club Aston Villa.

On 30 January 2018, Ogbene signed for English club Brentford on a three-and-a-half-year contract for an undisclosed fee. He made his league debut on 10 April 2018, making one further appearance that season. He moved on loan to Exeter City in August 2018.

On 29 August 2019, Ogbene joined League One club Rotherham United for an undisclosed fee, signing a three-year contract. In 2019–20, he played a central role in Rotherham's promotion-winning season, being described by manager Paul Warne as "unplayable" after he helped Rotherham beat Bristol Rovers by 3–0. He was injured between October 2020 and April 2021.

On 3 April 2022 he scored a goal as Rotherham won the EFL Trophy in a 4–2 victory over Sutton United.

On 27 June 2023, it was announced that Ogbene would join newly promoted Premier League side Luton Town on 1 July 2023 when his contract with Rotherham United came to an end.

In August 2024 he was linked with a transfer to newly promoted Premier League club Ipswich Town. He signed for the club later that month, on a four-year contract for an £8 million transfer fee. On 26 October 2024, Ogbene tore his Achilles in a 4–3 defeat away to his old club Brentford, ruling him out for the rest of the season. He later said that the nine months he spent out injured had made him wiser.

On 1 September 2025 he signed on loan for Sheffield United. He scored his first goal for the club in a 3–1 home victory against Oxford United.

On 1 September 2026, he signed for Championship club Lincoln City on loan until January. He made his debut against Southampton on 5 September, coming off the bench in a 1–1 draw.

== International career ==
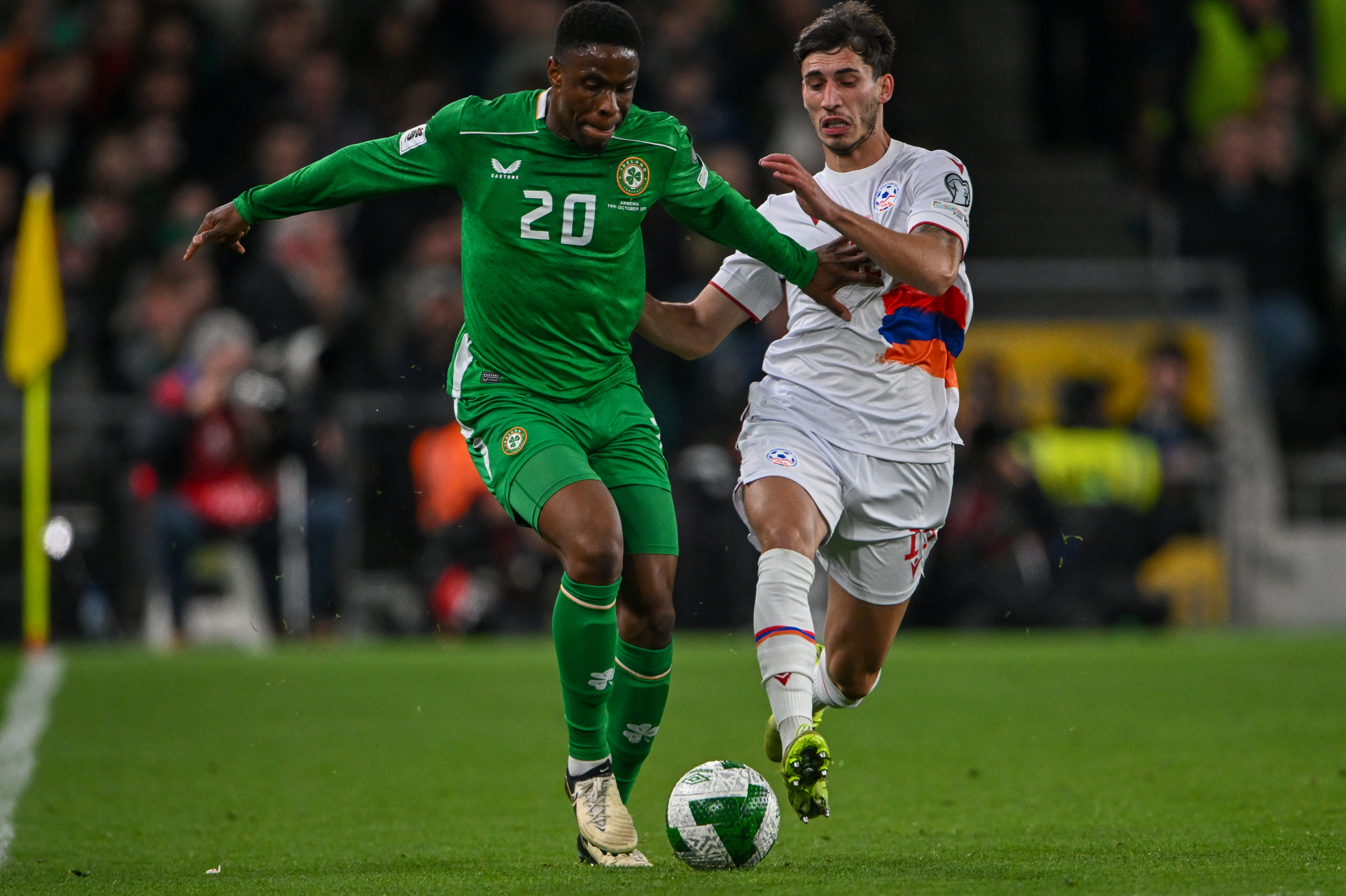
Ogbene with the Republic of Ireland in 2025

He was eligible to represent both Republic of Ireland and Nigeria at international level. In July 2020, Ogbene approached Republic of Ireland manager Stephen Kenny to declare his wish to play for the national team. On 24 May 2021, Ogbene received his first call up to the Republic of Ireland senior squad for the summer friendlies against Andorra and Hungary. He said he hoped to be a role model for other Irish players from a similar background. He made his debut on 8 June 2021 against Hungary, becoming the first African-born player to represent the Republic of Ireland. The Irish players had been booed by Hungarian fans prior to kick-off for taking the knee in a symbolic gesture against racism in the sport, which Ogbene asked UEFA to investigate.

Ogbene scored his first international goal on 9 October 2021 in a 2022 FIFA World Cup qualifier against Azerbaijan with a 90th-minute header in a 3–0 win at Baku Olympic Stadium.

He was named 2023 FAI Senior International Player of the Year for his performances for the international side.

== Career statistics ==
=== Club ===
As of match played 21 November 2026

Appearances and goals by club, season and competition
Club	Season	League			National cup (Note: Includes FAI Cup, FA Cup)		League cup (Note: Includes EFL Cup)		Other		Total	
Club	Season	Division	Apps	Goals	Apps	Goals	Apps	Goals	Apps	Goals	Apps	Goals
Cork City	2015	LOI Premier Division	1	0	0	0	0	0	0	0	1	0
Cork City	2016	LOI Premier Division	8	3	1	0	0	0	0	0	9	3
Cork City	Total		9	3	1	0	0	0	0	0	10	3
Limerick	2017	LOI Premier Division	32	8	2	0	0	0	0	0	34	8
Brentford	2017–18	Championship	2	0	0	0	0	0	—		2	0
Brentford	2018–19	Championship	4	0	2	0	1	0	—		7	0
Brentford	Total		6	0	2	0	1	0	0	0	9	0
Exeter City (loan)	2018–19	League Two	14	0	0	0	0	0	4 (Note: Appearance(s) in EFL Trophy)	0	18	0
Rotherham United	2019–20	League One	25	1	3	0	0	0	1	0	29	1
Rotherham United	2020–21	Championship	11	0	0	0	1	0	—		12	0
Rotherham United	2021–22	League One	45	3	3	0	1	0	4	1	53	4
Rotherham United	2022–23	Championship	39	8	1	0	2	1	—		42	9
Rotherham United	Total		120	12	7	0	4	1	5	1	136	14
Luton Town	2023–24	Premier League	30	4	4	1	2	0	—		36	5
Luton Town	2024–25	Championship	3	0	—		0	0	—		3	0
Luton Town	Total		33	4	4	1	2	0	0	0	39	5
Ipswich Town	2024–25	Premier League	5	0	0	0	1	0	—		6	0
Ipswich Town	2025–26	Championship	2	0	0	0	1	0	—		3	0
Ipswich Town	2026–27	Premier League	0	0	0	0	0	0	—		0	0
Ipswich Town	Total		7	0	0	0	2	0	0	0	9	0
Sheffield United (loan)	2025–26	Championship	13	1	0	0	0	0	—		13	1
Lincoln City (loan)	2026–27	Championship	11	0	0	0	1	0	—		12	0
Career total			245	28	16	1	10	1	9	1	280	31

=== International ===
As of match played 17 November 2026

Appearances and goals by national team and year
National team	Year	Apps	Goals
Republic of Ireland	2021	5	2
Republic of Ireland	2022	8	1
Republic of Ireland	2023	6	1
Republic of Ireland	2024	5	0
Republic of Ireland	2025	6	0
Republic of Ireland	2026	10	1
Total		40	5

Scores and results list the Republic of Ireland's goal tally first, score column indicates score after each Ogbene goal.

List of international goals scored by Chiedozie Ogbene
No.	Date	Venue	Opponent	Score	Result	Competition
1	9 October 2021	Bakı Olimpiya Stadionu, Baku, Azerbaijan	Azerbaijan	3–0	3–0	2022 FIFA World Cup qualification
2	14 November 2021	Stade de Luxembourg, Luxembourg City, Luxembourg	Luxembourg	2–0	3–0	2022 FIFA World Cup qualification
3	26 March 2022	Aviva Stadium, Dublin, Ireland	Belgium	1–1	2–2	Friendly
4	22 March 2023	Aviva Stadium, Dublin, Ireland	Latvia	3–2	3–2	Friendly
5	5 June 2026	Saputo Stadium, Montreal, Canada	Canada	1–1	1–1	Friendly

== Honours ==
=== Club ===
Cork City

- FAI Cup: 2016

Rotherham United

- EFL Trophy: 2021–22

=== Individual ===
- FAI Senior International Player of the Year: 2023
