= Enzio Boldewijn =

Dutch footballer (born 1992)

Personal information
- Full name: Enzio Imanuel Ruel Boldewijn
- Date of birth: 17 November 1992 (age 33)
- Place of birth: Almere, Netherlands
- Height: 1.85 m (6 ft 1 in)
- Positions: Winger; defender

Team information
- Current team: Bath City
- Number: 7

Youth career
- SC Voorland, SV Almere
- –2011: Utrecht

Senior career*
Years	Team	Apps	(Gls)
2011–2013	Utrecht	11	(0)
2012–2013	→ Den Bosch (loan)	31	(1)
2013–2016	Almere City	93	(16)
2016–2018	Crawley Town	91	(15)
2018–2021	Notts County	116	(19)
2021–2023	Sutton United	84	(3)
2023–2024	Eastleigh	42	(6)
2024–2026	Wealdstone	86	(7)
2026–	Bath City	6	(0)
- * Club domestic league appearances and goals as of 13:25, 6 September 2026 (UTC)

Enzio Imaniel Ruel Boldewijn (born 17 November 1992) is a Dutch professional footballer who plays as a winger or defender for Southern League Premier Division South club Bath City.

He started his career in his native Netherlands before moving to England in 2016 to join Crawley Town.

== Club career ==
=== Early career ===
Boldewijn began his career at SC Voorland in Amsterdam, before joining Utrecht. On 6 August 2011, Boldewijn made his Utrecht debut in a 0–0 draw against VVV-Venlo, in which he featured for 77 minutes before being replaced by Stefano Lilipaly.

On 1 July 2012, Boldewijn joined Eerste Divisie side FC Den Bosch on a season-long loan to gain first team experience. On 12 August 2012, Boldewijn made his FC Den Bosch debut in a 2–1 defeat against FC Oss, in which he featured up until the 80th minute before being replaced by Anthony van den Hurk. On 15 April 2013, Boldewijn scored his first FC Den Bosch goal in a 5–1 victory against Almere City, netting in the 63rd minute.

=== Almere City ===
On 1 July 2013, Boldewijn joined Almere City upon the expiry of his contract with Utrecht. On 3 August 2013, Boldewijn made his Almere City debut in a 3–2 defeat against FC Volendam. On 27 September 2013, Boldewijn scored his first Almere City goal in a 3–1 victory over Helmond Sport, in which he netted Almere City's third goal. Boldewijn started to impress between his two final years at Almere City, with an impressive tally of fourteen goals in over sixty games.

=== Crawley Town ===
On 16 May 2016, Boldewijn agreed a deal to join League Two side Crawley Town on 1 July, upon his release from Almere City. On 6 August 2016, Boldewijn made his Crawley debut in a 1–0 victory against Wycombe Wanderers. Three days later, Boldewijn scored his first goal for Crawley in a 2–1 EFL Cup loss against Wolverhampton Wanderers. He was offered a new contract by Crawley at the end of the 2017–18 season.

=== Notts County ===
On 4 July 2018, Boldewijn joined League Two side Notts County on a three-year deal for an undisclosed six-figure fee. He scored 22 goals in 128 appearances for the Magpies before being released at the end of the 2020–21 season.

=== Sutton United ===
On 6 July 2021, Boldewijn joined newly promoted League Two side Sutton United on a free transfer. He was part of the side that reached the 2022 EFL Trophy Final, scoring in Sutton's penalty shoot-out victory over Wigan Athletic in the semi-final, although he was an unused substitute in the final itself.

=== Eastleigh ===
In June 2023, Boldewijn joined National League side Eastleigh on a free transfer. In December 2023, he was linked to a return to former club Crawley Town, but reportedly opted to remain with Eastleigh. He departed the club upon the expiration of his contract at the end of the 2023–24 season.

=== Wealdstone ===
On 11 June 2024, Boldewijn joined National League side Wealdstone on a one-year deal with the option for a further twelve months. He scored his first goal for the club on 18 January 2025, scoring the equaliser in a 1–1 draw against Hartlepool United. In June 2025, it was announced that Boldewijn was contracted to Wealdstone for the 2025–26 season, ahead of which he was appointed as one of the club's vice-captains. He helped Wealdstone to reach the 2026 FA Trophy final, however missed the game through injury, before departing the club in May 2026.

=== Bath City ===
On 29 May 2026, Boldewijn joined Southern League Premier Division South club Bath City following their relegation the previous season.

== Personal life ==
Born in the Netherlands, Boldewijn is of Surinamese descent.

== Career statistics ==
As of match played 6 September 2026.

Appearances and goals by club, season and competition
Club	Season	League			National Cup		League Cup		Other		Total	
Club	Season	Division	Apps	Goals	Apps	Goals	Apps	Goals	Apps	Goals	Apps	Goals
Utrecht	2011–12	Eredivisie	11	0	1	0	—		—		12	0
Den Bosch (loan)	2012–13	Eerste Divisie	31	1	3	0	—		—		34	1
Almere City	2013–14	Eerste Divisie	27	2	1	0	—		—		28	2
Almere City	2014–15	Eerste Divisie	31	7	2	0	—		1 (Note: Appearance(s) in 2014–15 Eredivisie promotion play-offs)	0	34	7
Almere City	2015–16	Eerste Divisie	35	7	2	1	—		4 (Note: Appearance(s) in 2015–16 Eredivisie promotion play-offs)	1	41	9
Almere City	Total		93	16	5	1	—		5	1	103	18
Crawley Town	2016–17	League Two	46	5	2	0	1	1	3 (Note: Appearance(s) in EFL Trophy)	0	52	6
Crawley Town	2017–18	League Two	45	10	1	0	1	0	1	0	48	10
Crawley Town	Total		91	15	3	0	2	1	4	0	100	16
Notts County	2018–19	League Two	36	5	1	0	0	0	2	1	39	6
Notts County	2019–20	National League	39	8	3	1	0	0	4 (Note: Appearance(s) in FA Trophy)	0	46	9
Notts County	2020–21	National League	41	7	0	0	0	0	2	0	43	7
Notts County	Total		116	20	4	1	0	0	8	1	128	22
Sutton United	2021–22	League Two	39	2	2	0	1	0	7	0	49	2
Sutton United	2022–23	League Two	45	1	1	0	0	0	3	0	49	1
Sutton United	Total		84	3	3	0	1	0	10	0	98	3
Eastleigh	2023–24	National League	42	6	4	0	—		1	0	47	6
Wealdstone	2024–25	National League	45	2	3	0	—		3 (Note: Includes FA Trophy and National League Cup)	0	51	2
Wealdstone	2025–26	National League	41	5	3	0	—		7	1	51	6
Wealdstone	Total		86	7	6	0	0	0	10	1	102	8
Bath City	2026–27	Southern League; Premier Division South	6	0	1	0	—		0	0	7	0
Career total			560	68	30	2	3	1	38	3	631	74

== Honours ==
Sutton United

- EFL Trophy runner-up: 2021–22
