= Ricky Korboa =

English footballer

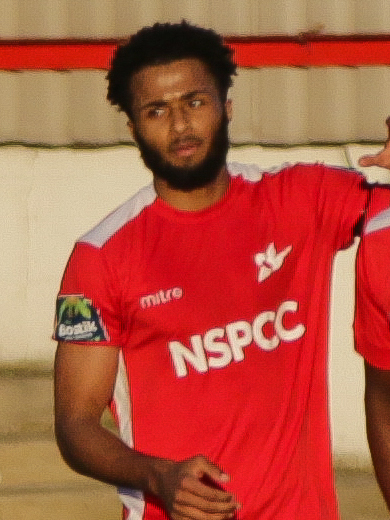
- Korboa in February 2019

Personal information
- Full name: Ricky Samuel Korboa
- Date of birth: 2 August 1996 (age 30)
- Place of birth: Liverpool, England
- Height: 5 ft 10 in (1.78 m)
- Positions: Winger; striker

Team information
- Current team: Tonbridge Angels
- Number: 7

Senior career*
Years	Team	Apps	(Gls)
2014–2020	Carshalton Athletic	168	(55)
2020–2021	Northampton Town	16	(2)
2021–2022	Sutton United	14	(2)
2022–2024	Woking	39	(8)
2024	Livingston	1	(0)
2025	Maidenhead United	5	(0)
2025	Carshalton Athletic	7	(1)
2025–	Tonbridge Angels	14	(3)
- * Club domestic league appearances and goals as of 17:46, 9 February 2026 (UTC)

Ricky Samuel Korboa (born 2 August 1996) is an English professional footballer who plays as a winger or striker for National League South club Tonbridge Angels.

== Career ==
=== Carshalton Athletic ===
Korboa made his debut for Carshalton Athletic in March 2014, and played for the Robins across seven seasons, scoring 55 goals in 168 games. He was an original attendee at the V9 Academy in 2017. Korboa was named in the Isthmian League Team of the Season for 2018–19, and won five of the club's seven player of the year awards that season.

=== Northampton Town ===
Korboa signed for Northampton Town on 1 September 2020 for an undisclosed fee on a one-year contract, with an option for a second year. He made his debut on 5 September 2020 in a 3–0 win against Cardiff City in the EFL Cup, providing assists for the second and third goals. He made his debut in the league a week later on 12 September 2020, in a 2–2 draw with AFC Wimbledon where he scored at the end of the first half to equal the match for the second time.

On 11 May 2021 it was announced that he would leave Northampton when his contract expired at the end of the season.

=== Sutton United ===
He signed for Sutton United on 1 July 2021. He was released by Sutton at the end of the 2021–22 season.

=== Woking ===
On 28 May 2022, it was announced that Korboa would join Woking, signing a two-year deal following the conclusion of his contract with Sutton in July. On 13 August 2022, he made his debut for the club during a 2–0 home victory over Dagenham & Redbridge, replacing Kyran Lofthouse with just over 10 minutes remaining. Two months later, he scored his first goal for the club during an FA Cup tie against Southend United, scoring the winner in the 82nd minute as a second-half substitute during the 2–1 win.

In the 2023–24 season Korboa scored seven times. Despite being offered a new deal, Korboa announced he would be leaving the club at the end of his contract in June 2024.

=== Livingston ===
In May 2024 it was announced that Korboa would join Scottish club Livingston for the 2024–25 season. After only four appearances, he left Livingston by mutual consent in December 2024.

=== Maidenhead United ===
On 24 December 2024, Maidenhead United announced that Korboa would be signing for the club on 1 January 2025. Korboa made six appearances for the Magpies before leaving the club at the end of the campaign after relegation.

=== Carshalton Athletic ===
In September 2025, Korboa returned to Isthmian League Premier Division club Carshalton Athletic.

=== Tonbridge Angels ===
On 23 October 2025, Korboa joined National League South club Tonbridge Angels.

== Personal life ==
Born in England, Korboa is of Ghanaian descent.

== Career statistics ==
As of match played 31 January 2026

Appearances and goals by club, season and competition
Club	Season	League			FA Cup		EFL Cup		Other		Total	
Club	Season	Division	Apps	Goals	Apps	Goals	Apps	Goals	Apps	Goals	Apps	Goals
Carshalton Athletic	2013–14	Isthmian League Premier Division	2	0	0	0	—		0	0	2	0
Carshalton Athletic	2014–15	Isthmian League Division One South	11	0	0	0	—		0	0	11	0
Carshalton Athletic	2015–16	Isthmian League Division One South	35	9	1	0	—		4 (Note: Two appearances in Alan Turvey Trophy, one appearance in FA Trophy, one appearance in Surrey Senior Cup)	0	40	9
Carshalton Athletic	2016–17	Isthmian League Division One South	31	15	3	2	—		3 (Note: Two appearances and two goals in FA Trophy, one appearance and one goal in Alan Turvey Trophy)	3	37	20
Carshalton Athletic	2017–18	Isthmian League Division One South	29	6	0	0	—		1 (Note: Appearance in FA Trophy)	0	30	6
Carshalton Athletic	2018–19	Isthmian League Premier Division	32	15	1	0	—		8 (Note: Six appearances in FA Trophy, one appearance in Surrey Senior Cup, one appearance in Isthmian League play-offs)	0	41	15
Carshalton Athletic	2019–20	Isthmian League Premier Division	28	10	5	3	—		4 (Note: Four appearances and one goal in FA Trophy)	1	37	14
Carshalton Athletic	Total		168	55	10	5	—		20	4	198	64
Northampton Town	2020–21	League One	16	2	1	0	1	0	4 (Note: Appearances in EFL Trophy)	0	22	2
Sutton United	2021–22	League Two	14	2	1	0	0	0	5	1	20	3
Woking	2022–23	National League	17	1	1	1	—		1	0	19	2
Woking	2023–24	National League	22	7	0	0	—		0	0	22	7
Woking	Total		39	8	1	1	—		1	0	42	9
Livingston	2024–25	Scottish Championship	1	0	0	0	3	0	0	0	4	0
Maidenhead United	2024–25	National League	5	0	0	0	—		1 (Note: Appearances in National League Cup)	0	6	0
Carshalton Athletic	2025–26	Isthmian League Premier Division	7	1	0	0	—		1	0	8	1
Tonbridge Angels	2025–26	National League South	14	3	—		—		—		14	3
Career total			264	71	13	6	4	0	32	5	313	82
