= Kenny Davis (footballer) =

English footballer

Personal information
- Full name: Kenny George Michael Davis
- Date of birth: 17 April 1988 (age 38)
- Place of birth: Camden, England
- Height: 5 ft 8 in (1.72 m)
- Position: Midfielder

Senior career*
Years	Team	Apps	(Gls)
2004–2005	Redbridge		
2005–2008	Harlow Town		
2008–2010	Grays Athletic	61	(2)
2010–2016	Braintree Town	241	(39)
2016–2017	Boreham Wood	42	(6)
2017–2022	Sutton United	145	(6)
2022	Farnborough	6	(0)
2022	→ Aldershot Town (loan)	4	(0)
- * Club domestic league appearances and goals as of 15:29, 19 April 2023 (UTC)

Kenny George Michael Davis (born 17 April 1988) is an English professional footballer who last played as a midfielder for Farnborough. He has played for Redbridge, Harlow Town, Grays Athletic, Braintree Town, Boreham Wood and Sutton United.

== Career ==
Davis spent his early career with Redbridge, Harlow Town, Grays Athletic and Braintree Town. He was captain of Braintree Town. He signed for Boreham Wood in May 2016, and Sutton United in May 2017. Davis was released by Sutton following their first season in the Football League at the end of the 2021–22 season.

On 2 July 2022, following his release from Sutton, Davis joined newly-promoted National League South side, Farnborough. In October 2022, Davis joined Aldershot Town on a one-month loan deal.

== Personal life ==
Upon Sutton's promotion to the Football League, Davis stated his commitment to retain his job as a black cab driver.

== Career statistics ==
As of match played 29 October 2022

Appearances and goals by club, season and competition
Club	Season	League			FA Cup		EFL Cup		Other		Total	
Club	Season	Division	Apps	Goals	Apps	Goals	Apps	Goals	Apps	Goals	Apps	Goals
Redbridge	2004–05	Conference South	No data currently available									
Harlow Town	2005–06	Southern League Eastern Division	No data currently available									
Harlow Town	2006–07	Isthmian League Division One North	No data currently available									
Harlow Town	2007–08	Isthmian League Premier Division	No data currently available									
Grays Athletic	2008–09	Conference Premier	25	0	1	0	—		0	0	26	0
Grays Athletic	2009–10	Conference Premier	36	2	1	0	—		0	0	37	2
Grays Athletic	Total		61	2	2	0	—		0	0	63	2
Braintree Town	2010–11	Conference South	41	4	0	0	—		1 (Note: Appearance(s) in the FA Trophy.)	0	42	4
Braintree Town	2011–12	Conference Premier	39	3	1	1	—		2	1	42	5
Braintree Town	2012–13	Conference Premier	39	11	2	0	—		1	0	42	11
Braintree Town	2013–14	Conference Premier	38	7	3	0	—		2	0	43	7
Braintree Town	2014–15	Conference Premier	40	8	1	0	—		4	2	45	10
Braintree Town	2015–16	National League	44	6	3	2	—		4 (Note: Two appearances in the FA Trophy, two appearances and one goal in the National League play-offs.)	1	51	9
Braintree Town	Total		241	39	10	3	—		14	4	265	46
Boreham Wood	2016–17	National League	42	6	3	0	—		6	3	51	9
Sutton United	2017–18	National League	41	2	2	0	—		1	0	44	2
Sutton United	2018–19	National League	31	3	2	0	—		4 (Note: Two appearances in the Scottish Challenge Cup, two in the FA Trophy.)	0	37	3
Sutton United	2019–20	National League	27	0	1	0	—		1	0	29	0
Sutton United	2020–21	National League	26	0	1	0	—		1	0	28	0
Sutton United	2021–22	League Two	20	1	1	0	1	0	4 (Note: Appearances in EFL Trophy)	0	26	1
Sutton United	Total		145	6	7	0	1	0	11	0	164	6
Farnborough	2022–23	National League South	6	0	—		—		0	0	6	0
Aldershot Town (loan)	2022–23	National League	4	0	1	0	—		0	0	5	0
Career total			499	53	23	3	1	0	31	7	554	63

== Honours ==
Sutton United

- EFL Trophy runner-up: 2021–22
