= Will Randall (footballer) =

English footballer (born 1997)

Personal information
- Full name: William Randall-Hurren
- Date of birth: 2 May 1997 (age 29)
- Place of birth: Swindon, England
- Height: 1.85 m (6 ft 1 in)
- Position: Winger

Team information
- Current team: Eastleigh

Youth career
- 2006–2014: Swindon Town

Senior career*
Years	Team	Apps	(Gls)
2014–2016	Swindon Town	9	(0)
2016–2019	Wolverhampton Wanderers	0	(0)
2017	→ Walsall (loan)	2	(0)
2017–2018	→ Forest Green Rovers (loan)	7	(0)
2018	→ FC Jumilla (loan)	8	(0)
2019	Newport County	1	(0)
2019–2023	Sutton United	111	(14)
2023–2024	Notts County	10	(0)
2024–2025	Ebbsfleet United	7	(0)
2024	→ Dorking Wanderers (loan)	6	(0)
2025	Wealdstone	11	(0)
2026–	Eastleigh	0	(0)
- * Club domestic league appearances and goals as of 17:14, 7 June 2026 (UTC)

William Randall-Hurren (born 2 May 1997) is an English professional footballer who plays as a winger for National League club Eastleigh.

== Playing career ==
=== Swindon Town ===
Randall became a scholar at Swindon Town in the summer of 2013. Will Randall made his professional football debut on the final day of the 2013–14 season as a second-half substitute against Rotherham United.

=== Wolverhampton Wanderers ===
On 12 January 2016 he moved to Championship team Wolverhampton Wanderers for an undisclosed fee in an 18-month deal.

On 31 January 2017, he signed for League One side Walsall on loan until the end of the season. He made two appearances for the club in all competitions, both as a substitute.

Randall signed a new deal with Wolves 29 August 2017 and on the same day he joined League Two newcomers Forest Green Rovers on loan until the end of the season. He was recalled from his loan spell on 1 January 2018 after making 8 appearances in all competitions for the club. Randall was released by Wolves on 15 January 2019.

=== Newport County ===
On 9 March 2019, Randall signed for Newport County until the end of the 2018–19 season. He made his debut for Newport the same day as a second-half substitute in the 3–0 League Two defeat to Colchester United. He was released by Newport at the end of the 2018–19 season.

=== Sutton United ===
On 17 July 2019, Randall signed for National League side Sutton United.

He was released by the club at the end of the 2022–23 season.

=== Notts County ===
On 2 June 2023 Randall signed for Notts County on a two-year deal following his release from Sutton United.

On 11 July 2024, he had his contract terminated by mutual consent.

=== Ebbsfleet United ===
On 7 September 2024, Randall joined National League side Ebbsfleet United.

On 7 November 2024, Randall joined National League South side Dorking Wanderers on loan until January 2025.

On 2 January 2025, Randall departed Ebbsfleet United following the expiry of his contract.

=== Wealdstone ===
On 17 January 2025, Randall signed for fellow National League side Wealdstone.

=== Eastleigh ===
On 30 June 2026, Randall returned to football having been without a club for the duration of the 2025–26 season, joining National League club Eastleigh.

== Career statistics ==
As of 5 May 2025

Appearances and goals by club, season and competition
Club	Season	League			FA Cup		League Cup		Other		Total	
Club	Season	Division	Apps	Goals	Apps	Goals	Apps	Goals	Apps	Goals	Apps	Goals
Swindon Town	2013–14	League One	1	0	0	0	0	0	0	0	1	0
Swindon Town	2014–15	League One	4	0	0	0	0	0	0	0	4	0
Swindon Town	2015–16	League One	4	0	0	0	1	0	1 (Note: Appearance in Football League Trophy)	0	6	0
Swindon Town	Total		9	0	0	0	1	0	1	0	11	0
Wolverhampton Wanderers	2016–17	Championship	0	0	0	0	0	0	—		0	0
Wolverhampton Wanderers	2017–18	Championship	0	0	0	0	0	0	—		0	0
Wolverhampton Wanderers	2018–19	Premier League	0	0	0	0	0	0	—		0	0
Wolverhampton Wanderers	Total		0	0	0	0	0	0	—		0	0
Wolverhampton Wanderers U23	2016–17	—			—		—		5 (Note: Appearance(s) in EFL Trophy)	0	5	0
Walsall (loan)	2016–17	League One	2	0	0	0	0	0	—		2	0
Forest Green Rovers (loan)	2017–18	League Two	7	0	0	0	0	0	1	0	8	0
FC Jumilla (loan)	2018–19	Segunda División B Group 4	8	0	—		—		—		8	0
Newport County	2018–19	League Two	1	0	0	0	0	0	0	0	1	0
Sutton United	2019–20	National League	23	2	1	0	—		2 (Note: Appearances in FA Trophy)	0	26	2
Sutton United	2020–21	National League	24	2	1	0	—		3	1	9	1
Sutton United	2021–22	League Two	28	4	2	2	0	0	5	1	35	5
Sutton United	2022–23	League Two	36	6	1	0	0	0	1	0	38	6
Sutton United	Total		111	14	5	2	0	0	11	2	127	18
Notts County	2023–24	League Two	10	0	1	0	0	0	2	0	13	0
Ebbsfleet United	2024–25	National League	7	0	0	0	—		1 (Note: Appearance(s) in National League Cup)	0	8	0
Dorking Wanderers (loan)	2024–25	National League South	6	0	0	0	—		1	0	7	0
Wealdstone	2024–25	National League	11	0	0	0	—		0	0	11	0
Career total			172	14	6	2	1	0	22	2	201	18

== Honours ==
Sutton United

- National League: 2020–21
- EFL Trophy runner-up: 2021–22
