= Louis John =

English footballer

Personal information
- Full name: Louis Tyler John
- Date of birth: 19 April 1994 (age 32)
- Place of birth: Croydon, England
- Height: 1.90 m (6 ft 3 in)
- Position: Central defender

Team information
- Current team: Ebbsfleet United
- Number: 6

Senior career*
Years	Team	Apps	(Gls)
2012–2014	Crawley Town	0	(0)
2012	→ Bognor Regis Town (loan)		
2014	→ Sutton United (loan)	16	(0)
2014–2018	Sutton United	74	(4)
2014	→ Lewes (loan)	5	(0)
2015	→ Metropolitan Police (loan)	7	(0)
2015–2016	→ Hemel Hempstead Town (loan)	6	(1)
2016	→ Hampton & Richmond Borough (loan)	4	(0)
2016–2017	→ Ebbsfleet United (loan)	1	(0)
2018–2020	Cambridge United	22	(0)
2019–2020	→ Sutton United (loan)	12	(0)
2020–2024	Sutton United	119	(9)
2024–	Ebbsfleet United	10	(0)

International career
2016–2017	England C	2	(2)
- * Club domestic league appearances and goals as of 11:56, 28 December 2024 (UTC)

Louis Tyler John (born 19 April 1994) is an English professional footballer who plays a central defender for National League South club Ebbsfleet United.

== Career ==
Born in Croydon, John began his career with Crawley Town, moving on loan to Bognor Regis Town in September 2012. He next played for Sutton United, initially on loan before the transfer was made permanent. While with Sutton he spent loan spells at Lewes, Metropolitan Police, Hemel Hempstead Town, Hampton & Richmond Borough and Ebbsfleet United. In May 2018 it was announced that John would turn professional with Cambridge United for the 2018–19 season. In November 2019 he returned to Sutton United on a two-month loan deal, before the deal was made permanent in January 2020.

In June 2024 he signed for Ebbsfleet United after his Sutton contract was cancelled by mutual consent.

== Career statistics ==
As of 5 May 2019

Appearances and goals by club, season and competition
Club	Season	League			FA Cup		League Cup		Other		Total	
Club	Season	Division	Apps	Goals	Apps	Goals	Apps	Goals	Apps	Goals	Apps	Goals
Crawley Town	2012–13	League One	0	0	0	0	0	0	0	0	0	0
Crawley Town	2013–14	League One	0	0	0	0	0	0	0	0	0	0
Crawley Town	Total		0	0	0	0	0	0	0	0	0	0
Sutton United (loan)	2013–14	Conference South	16	0	0	0	0	0	0	0	16	0
Sutton United	2014–15	Conference South	9	1	0	0	0	0	0	0	9	1
Sutton United	2015–16	National League South	14	1	0	0	0	0	0	0	14	1
Sutton United	2016–17	National League	15	0	0	0	0	0	0	0	15	0
Sutton United	2017–18	National League	36	2	2	1	0	0	2	0	40	3
Sutton United	Total		74	4	2	1	0	0	2	0	78	5
Lewes (loan)	2014–15	Isthmian League Premier Division	5	0	0	0	0	0	0	0	5	0
Hemel Hempstead Town (loan)	2015–16	National League South	6	1	0	0	0	0	0	0	6	1
Hampton & Richmond Borough (loan)	2016–17	National League South	4	0	0	0	0	0	0	0	4	0
Ebbsfleet United (loan)	2016–17	National League South	1	0	0	0	0	0	1 (Note: Appearance in the FA Trophy)	0	2	0
Cambridge United	2018–19	League Two	22	0	0	0	0	0	1	0	23	0
Career total			128	5	2	1	0	0	4	0	134	6

== Honours ==
Sutton United

- National League: 2020–21
- EFL Trophy runner-up: 2021–22
