= Matt Gray (footballer, born 1981) =

English football manager

Personal information
- Full name: Matthew Gray
- Date of birth: 16 September 1981 (age 45)
- Place of birth: London, England
- Position: Centre-back

Youth career
- Tottenham Hotspur
- Cardiff City

Senior career*
Years	Team	Apps	(Gls)
2001–2002	Barnet		
2002–2005	Hayes		
2005–2007	Havant & Waterlooville	12	(0)

Managerial career
- 2019–2023: Sutton United
- 2025: Eastbourne Borough
- 2026: Eastleigh
- * Club domestic league appearances and goals

Matthew Gray (born 16 September 1981) is an English professional football manager and former player.

== Playing career ==
A youth product of Tottenham Hotspur and Cardiff City, Gray had an unassuming senior career in the National League. He began his senior career at Barnet, with stints at Hayes, and Havant & Waterlooville where he was appointed the captain. He ended his playing career at 25, due to various injuries.

== Coaching career ==
=== Sutton United ===
After retiring as a footballer, Gray began coaching. His first stints were as the assistant manager at Eastleigh. He was also the assistant with EFL League Two clubs Aldershot Town and Crawley Town. In December 2018, he was appointed as one of the coaches at Sutton United.

On 22 April 2019, the long-term Sutton United manager Paul Doswell stepped down. Matt Gray was appointed interim manager for the last matchday that season in the National League alongside Ian Baird, and Micky Stephens. On 1 May 2019, he was formally appointed as the manager for the team. In the 2020–21 season, his second with Sutton United, Gray led the team to promotion into the English Football League for the first time in their 123-year history. He was named the National League manager of the year for the 2020–21 season.

In their first League Two season, Sutton finished 8th, missing out on the play-offs by one point, but also reaching the 2022 EFL Trophy final at Wembley Stadium, losing 4–2 after extra time against Rotherham United. Sutton finished 14th at the end of the 2022–23 season. The following season, on 19 December 2023, Gray was sacked from his role, with the club six points from safety following an 8–0 defeat at Stockport County.

=== Eastbourne Borough ===
On 23 May 2025, Gray was appointed head coach of National League South side Eastbourne Borough. Gray left Eastbourne Borough on 7 October 2025, having failed to win any of his first 10 league games in charge.

=== Eastleigh ===
On 14 May 2026, Gray was appointed manager of National League club Eastleigh having previously been assistant manager of the club fifteen years prior.

On 15 November 2026, following a 2–1 home defeat to AFC Fylde, Gray was sacked with the Spitfires eighteenth in the table.

== Managerial statistics ==
As of match played 14 November 2026

Managerial record by team and tenure
Team	From	To	Record				
Team	From	To	P	W	D	L	Win %
Sutton United	1 May 2019	19 December 2023	226	90	58	78	39.82
Eastbourne Borough	23 May 2025	7 October 2025	10	0	5	5	0.00
Eastleigh	14 May 2026	15 November 2026	19	6	4	9	31.58
Total			254	96	66	92	37.80

== Honours ==
=== Manager ===
Sutton United

- National League: 2020–21
- EFL Trophy runner-up: 2021–22

Individual

- National League Manager of the Year: 2020–21
