= Ben Goodliffe =

English footballer

Personal information
- Full name: Ben David Goodliffe
- Date of birth: 19 June 1999 (age 27)
- Place of birth: Watford, England
- Height: 6 ft 2 in (1.88 m)
- Position: Centre-back

Team information
- Current team: Southend United
- Number: 6

Youth career
- Tottenham Hotspur
- –2016: Boreham Wood

Senior career*
Years	Team	Apps	(Gls)
2016–2017	Boreham Wood	4	(0)
2017–2019	Wolverhampton Wanderers	0	(0)
2018–2019	→ Dagenham & Redbridge (loan)	33	(1)
2019–2024	Sutton United	155	(8)
2024–2025	Colchester United	11	(3)
2025–2025	→ Southend United (loan)	22	(3)
2025–	Southend United	46	(2)

International career^{‡}
- England Colleges
- * Club domestic league appearances and goals as of 24 September 2026 (UTC) ‡ National team caps and goals as of 12:30, 8 August 2021 (UTC)

Ben David Goodliffe (born 19 June 1999) is an English professional footballer who plays as a centre back for National League club Southend United.

== Club career ==
=== Early career ===
Born in Watford, Goodliffe played youth football for Tottenham Hotspur but was released at age 16 and joined Boreham Wood's academy. He made his senior debut on 7 February 2017 in a 5–0 FA Trophy win over Sutton United. He went on to make 4 further appearances for the club that season, all of which coming in the National League.

=== Wolverhampton Wanderers ===
In March 2017, it was announced that Goodliffe would join Wolverhampton Wanderers for an undisclosed fee on a two-year contract at the start of the summer transfer window. He scored once in 12 Premier League 2 appearances across the 2017–18 season. On 31 July 2018, Goodliffe joined National League side Dagenham & Redbridge on loan until January 2019. He made his debut on 4 August 2018 away to former club Boreham Wood, with Goodliffe sent off late on as Dagenham lost 1–0. He scored his first goal for the club on 1 December 2018 with a 90th-minute equaliser in a 2–1 win over Hartlepool United. In January 2019, his loan was extended until the end of the season. He scored once in 33 league matches during the 2018–19 National League. He was released by Wolves at the end of the 2018–19 season.

=== Sutton United ===
In July 2019, Goodliffe joined Sutton United of the National League. He scored twice in 35 league appearances during the 2019–20 campaign, which was ended prematurely due to the COVID-19 pandemic. Sutton United were promoted to EFL League Two as champions of the National League at the end of the 2020–21 season, with Goodliffe having made 34 appearances and scoring one goal. He was also included in the National League team of the season as number 5. On 29 June 2021, it was announced that Goodliffe had signed a new contract with the club, with his previous contract about to expire. He made his League Two debut on 7 August 2021 in a 2–1 defeat to Forest Green Rovers.

=== Colchester United ===
Goodliffe signed for Colchester United on 28 June 2024 on a two-year deal for an undisclosed fee.

On 10 August 2024, during Goodliffe's first league appearance for Colchester against Wimbledon, he scored twice in the first 10 minutes of the match before being forced off through injury after a coming together with a Wimbledon player. Colchester Manager Danny Cowley later confirmed that Goodliffe had dislodged three teeth and suffered two fractures in his mouth during the incident.

On 25 January 2025, Goodliffe joined National League side Southend United on loan for the remainder of the season.

=== Southend United ===
On 8 July 2025, Goodliffe signed for Southend United on a permanent basis for a free transfer signing a two-year deal with the club following his previous loan spell at the club during the second half of the prior season.

== International career ==
Goodliffe has captained the England Colleges team. In March 2020, Goodliffe was named in the England C squad for the first time.

== Personal life ==
He is the son of Jason Goodliffe, who played non-League football and was the interim manager of the first team at Sutton United. Goodliffe worked as a personal trainer whilst playing for Sutton United, prior to their promotion to League Two.

== Career statistics ==
As of match played 7 February 2026

Appearances and goals by club, season and competition
Club	Season	League			FA Cup		EFL Cup		Other		Total	
Club	Season	Division	Apps	Goals	Apps	Goals	Apps	Goals	Apps	Goals	Apps	Goals
Boreham Wood	2016–17	National League	4	0	0	0	—		1 (Note: Appearance(s) in the FA Trophy)	0	5	0
Wolverhampton Wanderers	2017–18	Championship	0	0	0	0	0	0	—		0	0
Wolverhampton Wanderers	2018–19	Premier League	0	0	—		—		—		0	0
Wolverhampton Wanderers	Total		4	0	0	0	0	0	—		0	0
Dagenham & Redbridge (loan)	2018–19	National League	33	1	2	0	—		2	0	37	1
Sutton United	2019–20	National League	35	2	2	0	—		2	0	39	2
Sutton United	2020–21	National League	34	1	1	0	—		3	0	38	1
Sutton United	2021–22	League Two	43	3	2	0	1	0	5 (Note: Appearance(s) in the EFL Trophy)	0	51	3
Sutton United	2022–23	League Two	23	0	0	0	0	0	0	0	23	0
Sutton United	2023–24	League Two	30	2	2	0	3	0	2	0	37	2
Sutton United	Total		198	9	9	0	4	0	14	0	225	9
Colchester United	2024–25	League Two	11	3	0	0	1	0	2	1	14	4
Southend United (loan)	2024–25	National League	19	2	0	0	–		4 (Note: 3 appearances and 1 goal in National League play-offs, 1 appearance in FA Trophy)	1	23	3
Southend United	2025–26	National League	23	2	1	0	–		1	0	25	2
Career total			255	16	10	0	5	0	22	2	292	18

== Honours ==
Sutton United

- National League: 2020–21
- EFL Trophy runner-up: 2021–22

Southend United

- FA Trophy: 2025–26

Individual

- National League Team of the Season: 2020–21
- Sutton United Player of the Season: 2021–22
