= List of English football transfers winter 2023–24 =

English football transfer window

The 2023–24 English football winter transfer window ran from 1 January to 1 February 2024. Players without a club could be signed at any time, clubs could sign players on loan dependent on their league's regulations, and clubs could sign a goalkeeper on an emergency loan if they had no registered senior goalkeeper available. This list includes transfers featuring at least one club from either the Premier League or the EFL that were completed after the end of the summer 2023 transfer window on 2 September 2023 and before the end of the 2024 winter window.

== Transfers ==
All players and clubs without a flag are English. While Cardiff City, Swansea City, Newport County and Wrexham are affiliated with the Football Association of Wales and thus take the Welsh flag, they play in the Championship and League Two respectively, and so their transfers are included here.

Date	Name	Moving from	Moving to	Fee
4 September 2023	(Northern Ireland) Cameron McGeehan	Unattached	Colchester United	Free
4 September 2023	(Republic of Ireland) Kieran Sadlier	Unattached	Wycombe Wanderers	Free
4 September 2023	(Colombia) Davinson Sánchez	Tottenham Hotspur	(Turkey) Galatasaray	£8.5m
5 September 2023	(Ivory Coast) Eric Bailly	Manchester United	(Turkey) Beşiktaş	Undisclosed
5 September 2023	(Mali) Moussa Djenepo	Southampton	(Belgium) Standard Liège	Undisclosed
5 September 2023	Jack Fitzwater	Unattached	Exeter City	Free
5 September 2023	(Switzerland) Andi Zeqiri	Brighton & Hove Albion	(Belgium) Genk	Undisclosed
7 September 2023	(Jamaica) Demarai Gray	Everton	(Saudi Arabia) Al-Ettifaq	£8m
8 September 2023	(Scotland) Steven Fletcher	Unattached	(Wales) Wrexham	Free
8 September 2023	(Ivory Coast) Nicolas Pépé	Arsenal	(Turkey) Trabzonspor	Free
8 September 2023	Axel Tuanzebe	Unattached	Ipswich Town	Free
8 September 2023	Connor Wood	Unattached	Tranmere Rovers	Free
9 September 2023	Callum Ainley	Unattached	Grimsby Town	Free
9 September 2023	Shaun MacDonald	Unattached	Exeter City	Free
9 September 2023	(Portugal) Joel Castro Pereira	Unattached	Reading	Free
14 September 2023	(Argentina) Franco Ravizzoli	Unattached	Wycombe Wanderers	Free
15 September 2023	(Australia) Caleb Watts	Unattached	Exeter City	Free
15 September 2023	(Suriname) Yanic Wildschut	Unattached	Exeter City	Free
18 September 2023	(France) Giulian Biancone	Nottingham Forest	(Greece) Olympiacos	Undisclosed
18 September 2023	Jesse Debrah	FC Halifax Town	Port Vale	Free
19 September 2023	(Namibia) Ryan Nyambe	Unattached	Derby County	Free
21 September 2023	Ben Heneghan	Unattached	Fleetwood Town	Free
26 September 2023	(United States) Reggie Cannon	Unattached	Queens Park Rangers	Free
27 September 2023	Chris Martin	Unattached	Bristol Rovers	Free
4 October 2023	Uche Ikpeazu	Unattached	Port Vale	Free
7 October 2023	Jordan Willis	Unattached	Northampton Town	Free
10 October 2023	(Republic of Ireland) Ciaran Clark	Unattached	Stoke City	Free
11 October 2023	Andros Townsend	Unattached	Luton Town	Free
13 October 2023	Ryan Sandford	Unattached	AFC Wimbledon	Free
14 October 2023	(Grenada) Aaron Pierre	Unattached	Shrewsbury Town	Free
16 October 2023	Sam Walker	Unattached	Charlton Athletic	Free
19 October 2023	Dominic Gape	Unattached	Sutton United	Free
20 October 2023	(Spain) Alex Rodríguez	Unattached	Oxford United	Free
27 October 2023	(Spain) Daniel Ayala	Unattached	Rotherham United	Free
2 November 2023	Tom Pett	Unattached	Cheltenham Town	Free
3 November 2023	Jonathan Mitchell	Unattached	Harrogate Town	Free
6 November 2023	Dan Gosling	Unattached	Notts County	Free
13 November 2023	Josh Martin	Unattached	Portsmouth	Free
16 November 2023	(Montserrat) Lyle Taylor	Unattached	Wycombe Wanderers	Free
23 November 2023	Josh Emmanuel	Unattached	Carlisle United	Free
27 November 2023	(Democratic Republic of the Congo) Yannick Bolasie	Unattached	(Wales) Swansea City	Free
30 November 2023	Joe Bennett	Unattached	Oxford United	Free
1 January 2024	Luke Armstrong	Harrogate Town	Carlisle United	Undisclosed
1 January 2024	(Republic of Ireland) Roland Idowu	(Republic of Ireland) Waterford	Shrewsbury Town	Undisclosed
1 January 2024	(Ivory Coast) Richard Kone	Athletic Newham	Wycombe Wanderers	Undisclosed
1 January 2024	(France) Hugo Lloris	Tottenham Hotspur	(United States) Los Angeles	Free
1 January 2024	(Scotland) Lewis Macari	Stoke City	Notts County	Undisclosed
1 January 2024	(Romania) Adrian Mazilu	(Romania) Farul Constanța	Brighton & Hove Albion	£2.5m
1 January 2024	(Republic of Ireland) Jack Moylan	(Republic of Ireland) Shelbourne	Lincoln City	Free
1 January 2024	(Brazil) Gustavo Scarpa	Nottingham Forest	(Brazil) Atlético Mineiro	£4m
1 January 2024	Billy Sharp	(United States) LA Galaxy	Hull City	Free
1 January 2024	(Iceland) Arnór Sigurðsson	(Russia) CSKA Moscow	Blackburn Rovers	Undisclosed
1 January 2024	(Republic of Ireland) Evan Weir	(Republic of Ireland) Drogheda United	Walsall	Undisclosed
1 January 2024	(Australia) Tete Yengi	Ipswich Town	(Scotland) Livingston	Undisclosed
3 January 2024	(Republic of Ireland) Ronan Coughlan	(Republic of Ireland) Waterford	Fleetwood Town	Free
3 January 2024	(Wales) Gwion Edwards	Unattached	Morecambe	Free
3 January 2024	(Republic of Ireland) Adam Murphy	(Republic of Ireland) St Patrick's Athletic	Bristol City	Undisclosed
3 January 2024	(Republic of Ireland) Conor Wilkinson	(Scotland) Motherwell	Colchester United	Undisclosed
4 January 2024	(Republic of Ireland) Jay McGrath	(Republic of Ireland) St Patrick's Athletic	Doncaster Rovers	Free
4 January 2024	Harrison Neal	Sheffield United	Carlisle United	Undisclosed
4 January 2024	Jed Steer	Unattached	Peterborough United	Free
4 January 2024	(United States) Zack Steffen	Manchester City	(United States) Colorado Rapids	Undisclosed
5 January 2024	(Republic of Ireland) Finn Azaz	Aston Villa	Middlesbrough	Undisclosed
5 January 2024	(Serbia) Bojan Radulović	(Finland) HJK	Huddersfield Town	Undisclosed
6 January 2024	Stephen Wearne	Gateshead	Milton Keynes Dons	Undisclosed
9 January 2024	Odin Bailey	Salford City	Stockport County	Undisclosed
9 January 2024	Ryan Sandford	Unattached	Crawley Town	Free
10 January 2024	(Wales) Joe Lewis	Stockport County	AFC Wimbledon	Undisclosed
11 January 2024	James Belshaw	Bristol Rovers	Harrogate Town	Undisclosed
11 January 2024	(Romania) Radu Drăgușin	(Italy) Genoa	Tottenham Hotspur	£25m
11 January 2024	Harry Lewis	Bradford City	Carlisle United	Undisclosed
11 January 2024	Ben Purrington	(Scotland) Ross County	Exeter City	Undisclosed
11 January 2024	(Denmark) Victor Torp	(Norway) Sarpsborg	Coventry City	Undisclosed
11 January 2024	Sam Walker	Charlton Athletic	Bradford City	Free
12 January 2024	Jack Bycroft	Southampton	Swindon Town	Undisclosed
12 January 2024	(Republic of Ireland) Conor Coventry	West Ham United	Charlton Athletic	Undisclosed
12 January 2024	Macaulay Gillesphey	Plymouth Argyle	Charlton Athletic	Undisclosed
12 January 2024	(Germany) Paul Glatzel	Liverpool	Swindon Town	Undisclosed
12 January 2024	Matt Macey	Unattached	Portsmouth	Free
12 January 2024	Josh Oluwayemi	Portsmouth	(Finland) Lahti	Undisclosed
12 January 2024	(Spain) Alex Rodríguez	Oxford United	Forest Green Rovers	Free
12 January 2024	(Montserrat) Lyle Taylor	Wycombe Wanderers	Cambridge United	Free
12 January 2024	Doug Tharme	Blackpool	Grimsby Town	Undisclosed
13 January 2024	(United States) Donovan Pines	(United States) D.C. United	Barnsley	Free
13 January 2024	(Scotland) Scott Robertson	Fleetwood Town	Notts County	Free
15 January 2024	Taylor Gardner-Hickman	West Bromwich Albion	Bristol City	Undisclosed
16 January 2024	(Wales) Brandon Cooper	(Wales) Swansea City	Leyton Orient	Undisclosed
16 January 2024	Kyle Edwards	Ipswich Town	Oxford United	Free
17 January 2024	Tom Holmes	Reading	Luton Town	Undisclosed
17 January 2024	Remeao Hutton	Swindon Town	Gillingham	Undisclosed
17 January 2024	Pharrell Johnson	Nottingham Forest	Swindon Town	Undisclosed
17 January 2024	Matthew Sorinola	Unattached	Plymouth Argyle	Free
18 January 2024	(Netherlands) Radinio Balker	(Netherlands) Groningen	Huddersfield Town	Undisclosed
18 January 2024	Brandon Barker	Unattached	Morecambe	Free
18 January 2024	(Grenada) Kayden Harrack	Queens Park Rangers	Morecambe	Free
18 January 2024	(Guyana) Deon Moore	Lewes	Sutton United	Undisclosed
18 January 2024	(Republic of Ireland) Emmanuel Osadebe	Bradford City	Forest Green Rovers	Undisclosed
19 January 2024	(Republic of Ireland) Ronan Curtis	Unattached	AFC Wimbledon	Free
19 January 2024	Rarmani Edmonds-Green	Huddersfield Town	Charlton Athletic	Undisclosed
19 January 2024	Adam Forshaw	Norwich City	Plymouth Argyle	Free
19 January 2024	Will Goodwin	Cheltenham Town	Oxford United	Undisclosed
19 January 2024	Rhys Healey	Watford	Huddersfield Town	Undisclosed
20 January 2024	(Argentina) Valentín Barco	(Argentina) Boca Juniors	Brighton & Hove Albion	£7.87m
22 January 2024	Josh Harrop	Unattached	Cheltenham Town	Free
22 January 2024	(Serbia) Kosta Nedeljković	(Serbia) Red Star Belgrade	Aston Villa	Undisclosed
22 January 2024	Josh Stokes	Aldershot Town	Bristol City	Undisclosed
22 January 2024	Lewis Ward	Swindon Town	Charlton Athletic	Free
23 January 2024	(Republic of Ireland) Ollie O'Neill	Fulham	Leyton Orient	Undisclosed
24 January 2024	Jez Davies	Burnley	Salford City	Free
24 January 2024	(Gibraltar) Tjay De Barr	Wycombe Wanderers	(Gibraltar) Lincoln Red Imps	Free
24 January 2024	(Australia) Kenny Dougall	Blackpool	(Thailand) Buriram United	Undisclosed
24 January 2024	(Republic of Ireland) Liam Kinsella	Swindon Town	Cheltenham Town	Undisclosed
24 January 2024	(Republic of Ireland) Connor O'Riordan	Crewe Alexandra	Blackburn Rovers	Undisclosed
25 January 2024	Nelson Abbey	Reading	(Greece) Olympiacos	Undisclosed
25 January 2024	(Republic of Ireland) Sam Curtis	(Republic of Ireland) St Patrick's Athletic	Sheffield United	Undisclosed
25 January 2024	(Argentina) Claudio Echeverri	(Argentina) River Plate	Manchester City	£12.5m
25 January 2024	Jamie Jellis	Tamworth	Walsall	Undisclosed
25 January 2024	(Wales) Luke Jephcott	(Scotland) St Johnstone	(Wales) Newport County	Free
25 January 2024	Josh Vela	Fleetwood Town	Carlisle United	Undisclosed
26 January 2024	(Sierra Leone) Kamil Conteh	Grimsby Town	Bristol Rovers	Undisclosed
26 January 2024	(Republic of Ireland) Charlie Cummins	(Republic of Ireland) Cobh Ramblers	Exeter City	Undisclosed
26 January 2024	(Croatia) Ivo Grbić	(Spain) Atlético Madrid	Sheffield United	Undisclosed
28 January 2024	(Switzerland) Michael Frey	(Belgium) Royal Antwerp	Queens Park Rangers	Undisclosed
29 January 2024	(Iraq) Ali Al-Hamadi	AFC Wimbledon	Ipswich Town	Undisclosed
29 January 2024	Callum Lang	Wigan Athletic	Portsmouth	Undisclosed
29 January 2024	(Belgium) Aaron Leya Iseka	Barnsley	(Greece) OFI Crete	Undisclosed
29 January 2024	(South Korea) Paik Seung-ho	(South Korea) Jeonbuk Hyundai Motors	Birmingham City	Undisclosed
29 January 2024	(Brazil) Ronald	(Brazil) Grêmio Anápolis	(Wales) Swansea City	Undisclosed
29 January 2024	(Wales) Jay Williams	Fulham	Sutton United	Undisclosed
30 January 2024	(Republic of Ireland) Millenic Alli	FC Halifax Town	Exeter City	Undisclosed
30 January 2024	(Japan) Daiki Hashioka	(Belgium) Sint-Truiden	Luton Town	Undisclosed
30 January 2024	(Norway) Leo Hjelde	Leeds United	Sunderland	Undisclosed
30 January 2024	(Democratic Republic of the Congo) Beryly Lubala	Burton Albion	Wycombe Wanderers	Free
30 January 2024	(Scotland) Tom McIntyre	Reading	Portsmouth	£75,000
30 January 2024	(Colombia) Daniel Muñoz	(Belgium) Genk	Crystal Palace	£6.8m
31 January 2024	Matt Butcher	Plymouth Argyle	Wycombe Wanderers	Free
31 January 2024	(Wales) Christian Doidge	(Scotland) Hibernian	Forest Green Rovers	Undisclosed
31 January 2024	Ryan Finnigan	Southampton	Blackpool	Undisclosed
31 January 2024	Adam Mayor	Morecambe	Millwall	Undisclosed
31 January 2024	Kyle McFadzean	Coventry City	Blackburn Rovers	Undisclosed
31 January 2024	(Iran) Allahyar Sayyadmanesh	Hull City	(Belgium) Westerlo	Undisclosed
1 February 2024	Josh Andrews	Birmingham City	Gillingham	Undisclosed
1 February 2024	Max Bird	Derby County	Bristol City	Undisclosed
1 February 2024	Luke Bolton	Salford City	(Wales) Wrexham	Undisclosed
1 February 2024	(Georgia (country)) Giorgi Chakvetadze	(Belgium) Gent	Watford	Undisclosed
1 February 2024	(Wales) Aaron Collins	Bristol Rovers	Bolton Wanderers	Undisclosed
1 February 2024	Owen Dale	Blackpool	Oxford United	Undisclosed
1 February 2024	(Republic of Ireland) Aaron Drinan	Leyton Orient	Swindon Town	Undisclosed
1 February 2024	Josh Earl	Fleetwood Town	Barnsley	Undisclosed
1 February 2024	(Jamaica) Niall Ennis	Blackburn Rovers	Stoke City	Undisclosed
1 February 2024	(Scotland) John Fleck	Sheffield United	Blackburn Rovers	Free
1 February 2024	(Australia) Joe Gauci	(Australia) Adelaide United	Aston Villa	Undisclosed
1 February 2024	Taylan Harris	Reading	Luton Town	Undisclosed
1 February 2024	(United States) Ethan Horvath	Nottingham Forest	(Wales) Cardiff City	Undisclosed
1 February 2024	Denver Hume	Portsmouth	Grimsby Town	Undisclosed
1 February 2024	(The Gambia) Alassana Jatta	(Denmark) Viborg	Notts County	Undisclosed
1 February 2024	(Republic of Ireland) Georgie Kelly	Rotherham United	Carlisle United	Undisclosed
1 February 2024	(Republic of Ireland) Tommy Lonergan	(Republic of Ireland) St Patrick's Athletic	Fleetwood Town	Undisclosed
1 February 2024	(Republic of Ireland) Calum Kavanagh	Middlesbrough	Bradford City	Undisclosed
1 February 2024	(United States) Jeremy Kelly	Unattached	Crawley Town	Free
1 February 2024	(Northern Ireland) Josh Kelly	Solihull Moors	AFC Wimbledon	Undisclosed
1 February 2024	(Netherlands) Million Manhoef	(Netherlands) Vitesse	Stoke City	Undisclosed
1 February 2024	Jack Marriott	Fleetwood Town	(Wales) Wrexham	Undisclosed
1 February 2024	Ephron Mason-Clark	Peterborough United	Coventry City	Undisclosed
1 February 2024	Sean McGurk	Leeds United	Swindon Town	Free
1 February 2024	(Scotland) Callan McKenna	(Scotland) Queen's Park	AFC Bournemouth	£300,000
1 February 2024	Owen Moxon	Carlisle United	Portsmouth	Undisclosed
1 February 2024	Romaine Mundle	(Belgium) Standard Liège	Sunderland	Undisclosed
1 February 2024	Tom Nichols	Gillingham	Mansfield Town	Undisclosed
1 February 2024	(Turkey) Abdülkadir Ömür	(Turkey) Trabzonspor	Hull City	Undisclosed
1 February 2024	(Poland) Przemysław Płacheta	Norwich City	(Wales) Swansea City	Free
1 February 2024	Finley Potter	Sheffield United	Fleetwood Town	Free
1 February 2024	Alex Pritchard	Sunderland	Birmingham City	Undisclosed
1 February 2024	Kayne Ramsay	Harrogate Town	Charlton Athletic	Undisclosed
1 February 2024	Morgan Rogers	Middlesbrough	Aston Villa	£8m
1 February 2024	Dan Sassi	Burnley	Blackpool	Undisclosed
1 February 2024	(Belgium) Matz Sels	(France) Strasbourg	Nottingham Forest	£5m
1 February 2024	Lino Sousa	Arsenal	Aston Villa	Undisclosed
1 February 2024	Matty Taylor	Forest Green Rovers	Cheltenham Town	Free
1 February 2024	Jordan Thomas	Bath City	Cheltenham Town	Undisclosed
1 February 2024	Curtis Thompson	Cheltenham Town	Grimsby Town	Free
1 February 2024	(Burkina Faso) Bertrand Traoré	Aston Villa	(Spain) Villarreal	Free
1 February 2024	(Scotland) David Turnbull	(Scotland) Celtic	(Wales) Cardiff City	Undisclosed
1 February 2024	Caylan Vickers	Reading	Brighton & Hove Albion	Undisclosed
1 February 2024	Adam Wharton	Blackburn Rovers	Crystal Palace	£18m

== Loans ==
Start date	End date	Name	Moving from	Moving to
4 September 2023	31 May 2024	(France) Tanguy Ndombele	Tottenham Hotpsur	(Turkey) Galatasaray
4 September 2023	31 May 2024	(Poland) Oliwier Zych	Aston Villa	(Poland) Puszcza Niepołomice
5 September 2023	31 May 2024	(Portugal) Daniel Podence	Wolverhampton Wanderers	(Greece) Olympiacos
7 September 2023	31 May 2024	(Nigeria) Samuel Kalu	Watford	(Switzerland) Lausanne
8 September 2023	31 May 2024	(Brazil) Philippe Coutinho	Aston Villa	(Qatar) Al-Duhail
11 September 2023	31 May 2024	(Nigeria) Paul Onuachu	Southampton	(Turkey) Trabzonspor
14 September 2023	31 May 2024	Jonjo Shelvey	Nottingham Forest	(Turkey) Çaykur Rizespor
15 September 2023	31 May 2024	(Democratic Republic of the Congo) Samuel Bastien	Burnley	(Turkey) Kasımpaşa
15 September 2023	24 January 2024	(Nigeria) Emmanuel Dennis	Nottingham Forest	(Turkey) İstanbul Başakşehir
21 September 2023	29 January 2024	(Belgium) Aaron Leya Iseka	Barnsley	(Israel) Hapoel Hadera
7 December 2023	14 December 2023	Joe Walsh	Queens Park Rangers	Accrington Stanley
15 December 2023	22 December 2023	James Belshaw	Bristol Rovers	Harrogate Town
1 January 2024	31 May 2024	(Saint Kitts and Nevis) Ethan Bristow	(United States) Minnesota United	Stockport County
1 January 2024	31 May 2024	(Portugal) Fábio Silva	Wolverhampton Wanderers	(Scotland) Rangers
1 January 2024	31 May 2024	(Netherlands) Donny van de Beek	Manchester United	(Germany) Eintracht Frankfurt
2 January 2024	31 May 2024	(Republic of Ireland) Dara Costelloe	Burnley	(Scotland) Dundee
2 January 2024	31 May 2024	(Scotland) Kerr Smith	Aston Villa	(Scotland) St Johnstone
3 January 2024	31 May 2024	(Republic of Ireland) Conor Carty	Bolton Wanderers	Doncaster Rovers
3 January 2024	31 May 2024	(Wales) Luke Harris	Fulham	Exeter City
3 January 2024	31 May 2024	(Ecuador) Jeremy Sarmiento	Brighton & Hove Albion	Ipswich Town
4 January 2024	31 May 2024	(Republic of Ireland) Emmanuel Adegboyega	Norwich City	Walsall
4 January 2024	31 May 2024	(Republic of Ireland) Seán Grehan	Crystal Palace	Carlisle United
4 January 2024	31 May 2024	Alex Matos	Chelsea	Huddersfield Town
4 January 2024	31 May 2024	(Ivory Coast) Bénie Traoré	Sheffield United	(France) Nantes
5 January 2024	31 May 2024	(Sweden) Yasin Ayari	Brighton & Hove Albion	Blackburn Rovers
5 January 2024	31 May 2024	Tyreeq Bakinson	Sheffield Wednesday	Charlton Athletic
5 January 2024	31 May 2024	(Chile) Ben Brereton Díaz	(Spain) Villarreal	Sheffield United
5 January 2024	31 May 2024	Ben Chrisene	Aston Villa	Blackburn Rovers
5 January 2024	31 May 2024	(Republic of Ireland) Dawson Devoy	Milton Keynes Dons	Swindon Town
5 January 2024	31 May 2024	(Scotland) Lewis Fiorini	Manchester City	Charlton Athletic
5 January 2024	31 May 2024	(Denmark) Daniel Iversen	Leicester City	Stoke City
5 January 2024	31 May 2024	(Germany) Thilo Kehrer	West Ham United	(France) Monaco
5 January 2024	31 May 2024	(Scotland) Archie Mair	Norwich City	Morecambe
5 January 2024	31 May 2024	(Brazil) Marcelo Pitaluga	Liverpool	(Republic of Ireland) St Patrick's Athletic
5 January 2024	31 May 2024	Lewis Travis	Blackburn Rovers	Ipswich Town
7 January 2024	31 May 2024	(Austria) Saša Kalajdžić	Wolverhampton Wanderers	(Germany) Eintracht Frankfurt
8 January 2024	31 May 2024	James Beadle	Brighton & Hove Albion	Sheffield Wednesday
8 January 2024	31 May 2024	Hayden Coulson	Middlesbrough	Blackpool
8 January 2024	31 May 2024	Lewis Leigh	Preston North End	Crewe Alexandra
8 January 2024	31 May 2024	Ashley Phillips	Tottenham Hotspur	Plymouth Argyle
9 January 2024	31 May 2024	(Wales) Eddie Beach	Chelsea	Gateshead
9 January 2024	31 May 2024	(Scotland) Matthew Craig	Tottenham Hotspur	Doncaster Rovers
9 January 2024	31 May 2024	Luke Cundle	Wolverhampton Wanderers	Stoke City
9 January 2024	31 May 2024	Kyran Lofthouse	Barnsley	Milton Keynes Dons
9 January 2024	31 May 2024	(Wales) Joe Taylor	Luton Town	Lincoln City
9 January 2024	31 May 2024	Jensen Weir	Brighton & Hove Albion	Port Vale
9 January 2024	31 May 2024	(Germany) Timo Werner	(Germany) RB Leipzig	Tottenham Hotspur
10 January 2024	31 May 2024	Luca Ashby-Hammond	Fulham	Notts County
10 January 2024	31 May 2024	Luke Ayling	Leeds United	Middlesbrough
10 January 2024	31 May 2024	Tyler Burey	(Denmark) Odense	Oxford United
10 January 2024	31 May 2024	(Portugal) Fábio Carvalho	Liverpool	Hull City
11 January 2024	31 May 2024	Joe Adams	Wigan Athletic	Morecambe
11 January 2024	31 May 2024	Jamie Cumming	Chelsea	Oxford United
11 January 2024	31 May 2024	Eric Dier	Tottenham Hotspur	(Germany) Bayern Munich
11 January 2024	31 May 2024	Josh Gordon	Burton Albion	Walsall
11 January 2024	31 May 2024	Charlie Lakin	Burton Albion	Sutton United
11 January 2024	31 May 2024	Jadon Sancho	Manchester United	(Germany) Borussia Dortmund
11 January 2024	31 May 2024	(Canada) Iké Ugbo	(France) Troyes	Sheffield Wednesday
11 January 2024	31 May 2024	Billy Waters	(Wales) Wrexham	Doncaster Rovers
12 January 2024	31 May 2024	(Scotland) Rob Apter	Blackpool	Tranmere Rovers
12 January 2024	31 May 2024	Harry Boyes	Sheffield United	Fleetwood Town
12 January 2024	31 May 2024	Luke Chambers	Liverpool	Wigan Athletic
12 January 2024	31 May 2024	Joe Hugill	Manchester United	Burton Albion
12 January 2024	31 May 2024	Gideon Kodua	West Ham United	Wycombe Wanderers
12 January 2024	31 May 2024	(Jamaica) Dexter Lembikisa	Wolverhampton Wanderers	(Scotland) Heart of Midlothian
12 January 2024	31 May 2024	(Netherlands) Ian Maatsen	Chelsea	(Germany) Borussia Dortmund
12 January 2024	31 May 2024	Justin Obikwu	Coventry City	Grimsby Town
12 January 2024	31 May 2024	Jayden Richardson	(Scotland) Aberdeen	Colchester United
12 January 2024	31 May 2024	Tommy Simkin	Stoke City	Forest Green Rovers
12 January 2024	31 May 2024	Dominic Thompson	Blackpool	Forest Green Rovers
12 January 2024	31 May 2024	Harry Wood	Hull City	Grimsby Town
13 January 2024	31 May 2024	(Ivory Coast) David Datro Fofana	Chelsea	Burnley
15 January 2024	31 May 2024	Nino Adom-Malaki	Millwall	Sutton United
15 January 2024	31 May 2024	(Tunisia) Hannibal Mejbri	Manchester United	(Spain) Sevilla
15 January 2024	31 May 2024	(The Gambia) Modou Faal	West Bromwich Albion	Walsall
15 January 2024	31 May 2024	(Wales) Eli King	(Wales) Cardiff City	(Scotland) Ross County
15 January 2024	31 May 2024	(Morocco) Imran Louza	Watford	(France) Lorient
15 January 2024	31 May 2024	Joe Rothwell	AFC Bournemouth	Southampton
15 January 2024	31 May 2024	Olly Sanderson	Fulham	Sutton United
15 January 2024	31 May 2024	(Republic of Ireland) Tony Springett	Norwich City	Northampton Town
15 January 2024	31 May 2024	Scott Twine	Burnley	Bristol City
15 January 2024	31 May 2024	(Austria) Andreas Weimann	Bristol City	West Bromwich Albion
15 January 2024	31 May 2024	(Republic of Ireland) Tyreik Wright	Plymouth Argyle	Bradford City
16 January 2024	31 May 2024	(Wales) Chem Campbell	Wolverhampton Wanderers	Wycombe Wanderers
16 January 2024	31 May 2024	Gerard Garner	Barrow	Morecambe
16 January 2024	31 May 2024	Louie Moulden	Wolverhampton Wanderers	Northampton Town
16 January 2024	31 May 2024	Rhys Williams	Liverpool	Port Vale
17 January 2024	31 May 2024	Alfie Devine	Tottenham Hotspur	Plymouth Argyle
17 January 2024	31 May 2024	(Spain) Álvaro Fernández	Manchester United	(Portugal) Benfica
17 January 2024	31 May 2024	John-Kymani Gordon	Crystal Palace	AFC Wimbledon
17 January 2024	31 May 2024	Tom Holmes	Luton Town	Reading
17 January 2024	31 May 2024	(Republic of Ireland) Conor McCarthy	Barnsley	Swindon Town
17 January 2024	31 May 2024	Vadaine Oliver	Bradford City	Stevenage
17 January 2024	31 May 2024	(Spain) Sergio Reguilón	Tottenham Hotspur	Brentford
17 January 2024	31 May 2024	Cole Stockton	Burton Albion	Barrow
17 January 2024	31 May 2024	(Ivory Coast) Hamed Traorè	AFC Bournemouth	(Italy) Napoli
18 January 2024	31 May 2024	Josh Austerfield	Huddersfield Town	Crewe Alexandra
18 January 2024	31 May 2024	(Scotland) Craig MacGillivray	Milton Keynes Dons	Stevenage
18 January 2024	31 May 2024	Rico Richards	Aston Villa	Stockport County
18 January 2024	31 May 2024	Japhet Tanganga	Tottenham Hotspur	Millwall
19 January 2024	31 May 2024	Lewis Bate	Leeds United	Milton Keynes Dons
19 January 2024	31 May 2024	Rhys Bennett	Manchester United	Stockport County
19 January 2024	31 May 2024	Owen Dodgson	Burnley	(Scotland) Dundee
19 January 2024	31 May 2024	Andre Dozzell	Queens Park Rangers	Birmingham City
19 January 2024	31 May 2024	Tyreece John-Jules	Arsenal	Derby County
19 January 2024	31 May 2024	Freddie Ladapo	Ipswich Town	Charlton Athletic
19 January 2024	31 May 2024	Filip Marschall	Aston Villa	Milton Keynes Dons
19 January 2024	31 May 2024	(Croatia) Ivan Perišić	Tottenham Hotspur	(Croatia) Hajduk Split
22 January 2024	31 May 2024	Hakeeb Adelakun	Lincoln City	Doncaster Rovers
22 January 2024	31 May 2024	Corey Blackett-Taylor	Charlton Athletic	Derby County
22 January 2024	31 May 2024	Charlie Goode	Brentford	Wigan Athletic
22 January 2024	31 May 2024	(Denmark) Emiliano Marcondes	AFC Bournemouth	(Scotland) Hibernian
22 January 2024	31 May 2024	(Romania) Adrian Mazilu	Brighton & Hove Albion	(Netherlands) Vitesse
22 January 2024	31 May 2024	(Serbia) Kosta Nedeljković	Aston Villa	(Serbia) Red Star Belgrade
22 January 2024	31 May 2024	Myles Peart-Harris	Brenford	Portsmouth
22 January 2024	31 May 2024	Jaden Warner	Norwich City	Notts County
23 January 2024	31 May 2024	Tolaji Bola	Rotherham United	Burton Albion
23 January 2024	31 May 2024	Dan Gore	Manchester United	Port Vale
23 January 2024	31 May 2024	Riley Harbottle	(Scotland) Hibernian	Colchester United
23 January 2024	31 May 2024	(Colombia) Yerson Mosquera	Wolverhampton Wanderers	(Spain) Villarreal
23 January 2024	31 May 2024	(Republic of Ireland) Michael Obafemi	Burnley	Millwall
24 January 2024	31 May 2024	(Nigeria) Emmanuel Dennis	Nottingham Forest	Watford
24 January 2024	31 May 2024	Alistair Smith	Lincoln City	Colchester United
25 January 2024	31 May 2024	Jack Diamond	Sunderland	Carlisle United
25 January 2024	31 May 2024	(Guyana) Stephen Duke-McKenna	Queens Park Rangers	Sutton United
25 January 2024	1 January 2025	(Argentina) Claudio Echeverri	Manchester City	(Argentina) River Plate
25 January 2024	31 May 2024	Teddy Jenks	Forest Green Rovers	(Scotland) Ross County
25 January 2024	31 May 2024	Ademola Ola-Adebomi	Crystal Palace	Burton Albion
25 January 2024	31 May 2024	(Czech Republic) Radek Vitek	Manchester United	Accrington Stanley
25 January 2024	31 May 2024	Josh Walker	Burton Albion	Gillingham
26 January 2024	31 May 2024	Harry Anderson	Stevenage	Colchester United
26 January 2024	31 May 2024	(Belgium) Leander Dendoncker	Aston Villa	(Italy) Napoli
26 January 2024	31 May 2024	(Northern Ireland) Callum Marshall	West Ham United	West Bromwich Albion
26 January 2024	31 May 2024	Jonathan Leko	Milton Keynes Dons	Burton Albion
26 January 2024	31 May 2024	Nathanael Ogbeta	(Wales) Swansea City	Bolton Wanderers
26 January 2024	31 May 2024	Kalvin Phillips	Manchester City	West Ham United
26 January 2024	31 May 2024	Luke Thomas	Leicester City	Middlesbrough
29 January 2024	31 May 2024	(Scotland) Calvin Ramsay	Liverpool	Bolton Wanderers
30 January 2024	31 May 2024	(Wales) Owen Beck	Liverpool	(Scotland) Dundee
30 January 2024	31 May 2024	(Costa Rica) Jewison Bennette	Sunderland	(Greece) Aris
30 January 2024	31 May 2024	(Wales) David Brooks	AFC Bournemouth	Southampton
30 January 2024	31 May 2024	(Sudan) Mohamed Eisa	Milton Keynes Dons	Exeter City
30 January 2024	31 May 2024	(Republic of Ireland) Zack Elbouzedi	(Sweden) AIK	Swindon Town
30 January 2024	31 May 2024	James Gibbons	Bristol Rovers	Cambridge United
30 January 2024	31 May 2024	Ryan Giles	Luton Town	Hull City
30 January 2024	31 May 2024	(Scotland) Scott McKenna	Nottingham Forest	(Denmark) Copenhagen
30 January 2024	31 May 2024	Michael Olakigbe	Brentford	Peterborough United
30 January 2024	31 May 2024	Nat Phillips	Liverpool	(Wales) Cardiff City
31 January 2024	31 May 2024	(The Gambia) Ebou Adams	(Wales) Cardiff City	Derby County
31 January 2024	31 May 2024	(Northern Ireland) Kofi Balmer	Crystal Palace	AFC Wimbledon
31 January 2024	31 May 2024	Charlie Colkett	Crewe Alexandra	Notts County
31 January 2024	31 May 2024	(Senegal) Famara Diédhiou	(Spain) Granada	(Wales) Cardiff City
31 January 2024	31 May 2024	Kyle Hudlin	Huddersfield Town	Burton Albion
31 January 2024	31 May 2024	(United States) Charlie Kelman	Queens Park Rangers	Wigan Athletic
31 January 2024	31 May 2024	(France) Noha Lemina	(France) Paris Saint-Germain	Wolverhampton Wanderers
31 January 2024	31 May 2024	(Democratic Republic of the Congo) Jason Lokilo	Hull City	(Portugal) Vizela
31 January 2024	31 May 2024	(Uruguay) Facundo Pellistri	Manchester United	(Spain) Granada
31 January 2024	31 May 2024	(United States) Giovanni Reyna	(Germany) Borussia Dortmund	Nottingham Forest
31 January 2024	31 May 2024	(Uzbekistan) Mukhammadali Urinboev	(Uzbekistan) Pakhtakor	Brentford
1 February 2024	31 May 2024	Derrick Abu	Southampton	Harrogate Town
1 February 2024	31 May 2024	Daniel Adu-Adjei	AFC Bournemouth	Leyton Orient
1 February 2024	31 May 2024	(Costa Rica) Brandon Aguilera	Nottingham Forest	Bristol Rovers
1 February 2024	31 May 2024	(France) Lorenz Assignon	(France) Rennes	Burnley
1 February 2024	31 May 2024	(Indonesia) Elkan Baggott	Ipswich Town	Bristol Rovers
1 February 2024	31 May 2024	(Wales) Owen Bevan	AFC Bournemouth	(Scotland) Hibernian
1 February 2024	31 May 2024	Jake Bickerstaff	(Wales) Wrexham	Accrington Stanley
1 February 2024	31 May 2024	Max Bird	Bristol City	Derby County
1 February 2024	31 May 2024	(Republic of Ireland) Tom Bloxham	Blackburn Rovers	Harrogate Town
1 February 2024	31 May 2024	(Zimbabwe) Macauley Bonne	Gillingham	Cambridge United
1 February 2024	31 May 2024	(Albania) Armando Broja	Chelsea	Fulham
1 February 2024	31 May 2024	(Scotland) George Byers	Sheffield Wednesday	Blackpool
1 February 2024	31 May 2024	(Colombia) Jorge Cabezas Hurtado	Watford	Gillingham
1 February 2024	31 May 2024	Elijah Campbell	Everton	Fleetwood Town
1 February 2024	31 May 2024	Lewis Cass	Port Vale	Stockport County
1 February 2024	31 May 2024	Daniel Chesters	West Ham United	Salford City
1 February 2024	31 May 2024	(Germany) Mahmoud Dahoud	Brighton & Hove Albion	(Germany) VfB Stuttgart
1 February 2024	31 May 2024	Saxon Earley	Plymouth Argyle	Wycombe Wanderers
1 February 2024	31 May 2024	Khayon Edwards	Arsenal	Leyton Orient
1 February 2024	31 May 2024	CJ Egan-Riley	Burnley	(Netherlands) PSV Eindhoven
1 February 2024	31 May 2024	(France) Maxime Estève	(France) Montpellier	Burnley
1 February 2024	31 May 2024	Josh Feeney	Aston Villa	(Spain) Real Unión
1 February 2024	31 May 2024	Antwoine Hackford	Sheffield United	Burton Albion
1 February 2024	31 May 2024	Isaac Hayden	Newcastle United	Queens Park Rangers
1 February 2024	31 May 2024	Jack Hinchy	Brighton & Hove Albion	Shrewsbury Town
1 February 2024	31 May 2024	(Republic of Ireland) Joe Hodge	Wolverhampton Wanderers	Queens Park Rangers
1 February 2024	31 May 2024	Mason Holgate	Everton	Sheffield United
1 February 2024	31 May 2024	(Republic of Ireland) Adam Idah	Norwich City	(Scotland) Celtic
1 February 2024	31 May 2024	(Republic of Ireland) Mikey Johnston	(Scotland) Celtic	West Bromwich Albion
1 February 2024	31 May 2024	(Malawi) Nelson Khumbeni	Bolton Wanderers	Morecambe
1 February 2024	31 May 2024	(Republic of Ireland) Gavin Kilkenny	AFC Bournemouth	Fleetwood Town
1 February 2024	31 May 2024	(France) Billy Koumetio	Liverpool	Blackburn Rovers
1 February 2024	31 May 2024	(Sweden) Julian Larsson	Nottingham Forest	Morecambe
1 February 2024	31 May 2024	(Netherlands) Nigel Lonwijk	Wolverhampton Wanderers	Wycombe Wanderers
1 February 2024	31 May 2024	(Poland) Kacper Łopata	Barnsley	Port Vale
1 February 2024	31 May 2024	(France) Thimothée Lo-Tutala	Hull City	Doncaster Rovers
1 February 2024	31 May 2024	(Belgium) Orel Mangala	Nottingham Forest	(France) Lyon
1 February 2024	31 May 2024	Jay Matete	Sunderland	Oxford United
1 February 2024	31 May 2024	Ephron Mason-Clark	Coventry City	Peterborough United
1 February 2024	31 May 2024	(Spain) Eliezer Mayenda	Sunderland	(Scotland) Hibernian
1 February 2024	31 May 2024	(Scotland) Jon McCracken	Norwich City	(Scotland) Dundee
1 February 2024	31 May 2024	(Scotland) Conor McGrandles	Charlton Athletic	Lincoln City
1 February 2024	31 May 2024	(United States) Duncan McGuire	(United States) Orlando City	Blackburn Rovers
1 February 2024	31 May 2024	Harry McKirdy	(Scotland) Hibernian	Swindon Town
1 February 2024	31 May 2024	(Scotland) Adedire Mebude	(Belgium) Westerlo	Bristol City
1 February 2024	31 May 2024	Alex Mighten	Nottingham Forest	Port Vale
1 February 2024	31 May 2024	Zane Monlouis	Arsenal	Reading
1 February 2024	31 May 2024	(Wales) Kieffer Moore	AFC Bournemouth	Ipswich Town
1 February 2024	31 May 2024	Joe Nuttall	Oldham Athletic	Cheltenham Town
1 February 2024	31 May 2024	Tommi O'Reilly	Aston Villa	(Spain) Real Unión
1 February 2024	31 May 2024	(Republic of Ireland) John-Joe O'Toole	Mansfield Town	AFC Wimbledon
1 February 2024	31 May 2024	(Denmark) Kristian Pedersen	(Wales) Swansea City	Sheffield Wednesday
1 February 2024	31 May 2024	(Colombia) Ian Poveda	Leeds United	Sheffield Wednesday
1 February 2024	31 May 2024	(Portugal) Rodrigo Ribeiro	(Portugal) Sporting CP	Nottingham Forest
1 February 2024	31 May 2024	(Zimbabwe) Andy Rinomhota	(Wales) Cardiff City	Rotherham United
1 February 2024	31 May 2024	(Wales) Connor Roberts	Burnley	Leeds United
1 February 2024	31 May 2024	Charles Sagoe Jr.	Arsenal	(Wales) Swansea City
1 February 2024	31 May 2024	Imari Samuels	Brighton & Hove Albion	Fleetwood Town
1 February 2024	31 May 2024	(Brazil) Andrey Santos	Chelsea	(France) Strasbourg
1 February 2024	31 May 2024	Femi Seriki	Sheffield United	Rotherham United
1 February 2024	31 May 2024	Jack Shepherd	Barnsley	Cheltenham Town
1 February 2024	31 May 2024	(Turkey) Doğukan Sinik	Hull City	(Turkey) Hatayspor
1 February 2024	31 May 2024	(Scotland) Liam Smith	Cheltenham Town	Grimsby Town
1 February 2024	31 May 2024	Lino Sousa	Aston Villa	Plymouth Argyle
1 February 2024	31 May 2024	(Hungary) Callum Styles	Barnsley	Sunderland
1 February 2024	31 May 2024	Caleb Taylor	West Bromwich Albion	Bolton Wanderers
1 February 2024	31 May 2024	Emre Tezgel	Stoke City	Milton Keynes Dons
1 February 2024	31 May 2024	(Australia) Nectarios Triantis	Sunderland	(Scotland) Hibernian
1 February 2024	31 May 2024	(Wales) Ed Turns	Brighton & Hove Albion	Crewe Alexandra
1 February 2024	31 May 2024	(Turkey) Enes Ünal	(Spain) Getafe	AFC Bournemouth
1 February 2024	31 May 2024	(Netherlands) Sydney van Hooijdonk	(Italy) Bologna	Norwich City
1 February 2024	31 May 2024	(Republic of Ireland) Harry Vaughan	Hull City	Bristol Rovers
1 February 2024	31 May 2024	(Argentina) Alejo Véliz	Tottenham Hotspur	(Spain) Sevilla
1 February 2024	31 May 2024	Josh Wilson-Esbrand	Manchester City	(Wales) Cardiff City
1 February 2024	31 May 2024	(Wales) Nathan Wood	(Wales) Newport County	(Republic of Ireland) Cork City
1 February 2024	31 May 2024	Ryan Woods	Hull City	Exeter City
1 February 2024	31 May 2024	Charlie Wyke	Wigan Athletic	Rotherham United
1 February 2024	31 May 2024	(Morocco) Anass Zaroury	Burnley	Hull City
