= 2023–24 Sutton United F.C. season =

97th season in existence of Sutton United FC

Sutton United
2023–24 season
- Chairman: Bruce Elliott
- Manager: Matt Gray (until 19 December); Steve Morison (from 6 January)
- Stadium: Gander Green Lane
- League Two: 23rd (relegated to National League)
- FA Cup: Third round (eliminated by Plymouth Argyle)
- EFL Cup: Third round (eliminated by Port Vale)
- EFL Trophy: Group stage
- Top goalscorer: League: Harry Smith (11); All: Harry Smith (14)
- Highest home attendance: 4,831 v Wrexham, 13 February 2024
- Lowest home attendance: 859 v Aston Villa F.C. Under-21s, 20 September 2023
- Average home league attendance: 3,302
- Biggest win: 5-1 v Notts County, 5 August 2023; 4-0 v Walsall, 7 October 2023
- Biggest defeat: 0-8 v Stockport County, 16 December 2023

The 2023–24 season is the 97th season in the history of Sutton United and their third consecutive season in League Two. The club are participating in League Two, the FA Cup, the EFL Cup, and the 2023–24 EFL Trophy.

== Current squad ==
As of 23 March 2024

No.	Name	Position	Nationality	Place of birth	Date of birth (age)	Previous club	Date signed	Fee	Contract end
Goalkeepers
1	Jack Rose	GK	(England)	Solihull	31 January 1995 (age 31)	Walsall	1 July 2022	Free	30 June 2024
13	Brad House	GK	(England)	Worthing	19 October 1998 (age 28)	West Bromwich Albion	23 September 2020	Free	30 June 2024
21	Dean Bouzanis	GK	(Australia)	Sydney	2 October 1990 (age 36)	Reading	1 September 2023	Loan	31 May 2024
25	Steve Arnold	GK	(England)	Welham Green	22 August 1989 (age 37)	Southend United	1 July 2023	Free	30 June 2024
Defenders
2	Jonathan Barden	RB	(England)	Harrow	9 November 1992 (age 34)	(United States) Saint Louis	18 June 2019	Free	30 June 2024
3	Nino Adom-Malaki	LB	(England)		24 February 2004 (age 22)	Millwall	15 January 2024	Loan	31 May 2024
4	Omar Sowunmi	CB	(England)	Colchester	7 November 1995 (age 31)	Bromley	1 July 2023	Free	30 June 2025
5	Ben Goodliffe	CB	(England)	Watford	19 June 1999 (age 27)	Wolverhampton Wanderers	12 July 2019	Free	30 June 2024
6	Louis John	CB	(England)	Croydon	19 April 1994 (age 32)	Cambridge United	23 January 2020	Undisclsoed	30 June 2024
22	Joe Kizzi	RB	(England)	Enfield	24 June 1993 (age 33)	Bromley	1 July 2021	Free	30 June 2024
23	Ryan Jackson	RB	(England)	Streatham	31 July 1990 (age 36)	Cheltenham Town	1 July 2023	Free	30 June 2024
24	Rob Milsom	LB	(England)	Redhill	2 January 1987 (age 39)	Notts County	1 August 2019	Free	30 June 2024
28	Oliver Khinda	RB	(England)		1 November 2004 (age 22)	Academy	—N/a	—N/a	30 June 2024
35	Jack Taylor	CB	(England)		8 September 2005 (age 21)	Academy	—N/a	—N/a	30 June 2024
39	Jay Williams	CB	(Wales)		26 February 2003 (age 23)	Fulham	29 January 2024	Undisclosed	30 June 2025
42	Sam Hart	LB	(England)	Bolton	10 September 1996 (age 30)	Oldham Athletic	1 July 2022	Free	30 June 2024
Midfielders
7	Josh Coley	AM	(England)	Stevenage	24 July 1998 (age 28)	Exeter City	1 July 2023	Undisclosed	30 June 2025
8	Christian N'Guessan	CM	(England)	Lewisham	20 October 1998 (age 28)	Ebbsfleet United	1 July 2023	Free	30 June 2025
10	Harry Beautyman	CM	(England)	Newham	1 April 1992 (age 34)	Stevenage	4 January 2018	Undisclosed	30 June 2024
14	Craig Dundas	CM	(England)	Lambeth	16 February 1981 (age 45)	Hampton & Richmond Borough	1 July 2019	Free	30 June 2024
15	Craig Eastmond	CM	(England)	Battersea	6 December 1990 (age 35)	Yeovil Town	9 September 2015	Free	30 June 2024
16	Craig Clay	CM	(England)	Nottingham	5 May 1992 (age 34)	Leyton Orient	1 July 2023	Free	30 June 2025
31	Charlie Lakin	CM	(England)	Solihull	8 May 1999 (age 27)	Burton Albion	11 January 2024	Loan	31 May 2024
37	Liam Moore	CM	(England)			Academy	20 November 2023	Trainee	30 June 2024
50	Stephen Duke-McKenna	RM	(Guyana)	(England) Liverpool	17 August 2000 (age 26)	Queens Park Rangers	25 January 2024	Loan	31 May 2024
Forwards
9	Harry Smith	CF	(England)	Chatham	18 May 1995 (age 31)	Leyton Orient	1 July 2023	Free	30 June 2025
11	Omari Patrick	LW	(England)	Slough	24 May 1996 (age 30)	Carlisle United	26 July 2023	Free	30 June 2025
19	Tope Fadahunsi	CF	(England)	Wandsworth	29 August 1999 (age 27)	Loughborough University	16 July 2022	Free	30 June 2024
20	Scott Kashket	RW	(England)	Chigwell	25 February 1996 (age 30)	Gillingham	25 July 2023	Free	30 June 2025
27	Deon Moore	CF	(Guyana)	(England) Croydon	14 May 1999 (age 27)	Lewes	18 January 2024	Free	30 June 2024
29	Hisham Kasimu	CF	(France)	Lagny-sur-Marne	28 July 1997 (age 29)	Farnborough	27 January 2023	Undisclosed	30 June 2024
38	Olly Sanderson	CF	(England)	Chichester	30 December 2003 (age 22)	Fulham	15 January 2024	Loan	31 May 2024
Out on Loan
12	Tobi Ogundega	CB	(England)		12 February 2004 (age 22)	Milton Keynes Dons	19 July 2022	Free	30 June 2024
30	Matt Kerbey	GK	(England)		27 June 2002 (age 24)	Academy	1 July 2022	—N/a	30 June 2024
33	Lee Angol	CF	(England)	Carshalton	4 August 1994 (age 32)	Bradford City	11 January 2023	Undisclosed	30 June 2024

== Transfers ==
=== In ===
Date	Pos	Player	Transferred from	Fee	Ref
30 June 2023	AM	Josh Coley (ENG)	Exeter City (ENG)	Undisclosed	
1 July 2023	GK	Steve Arnold (ENG)	Southend United (ENG)	Free transfer	
1 July 2023	CM	Craig Clay (ENG)	Leyton Orient (ENG)	Free transfer	
1 July 2023	RB	Ryan Jackson (ENG)	Cheltenham Town (ENG)	Free transfer	
1 July 2023	CM	Christian N'Guessan (ENG)	Ebbsfleet United (ENG)	Free transfer	
1 July 2023	CF	Harry Smith (ENG)	Leyton Orient (ENG)	Free transfer	
1 July 2023	CB	Omar Sowunmi (ENG)	Bromley (ENG)	Free transfer	
25 July 2023	RW	Scott Kashket (ENG)	Gillingham (ENG)	Free transfer	
26 July 2023	LW	Omari Patrick (ENG)	Carlisle United (ENG)	Free transfer	
19 October 2023	DM	Dominic Gape (ENG)	Free agent	—N/a	
18 January 2024	CF	Deon Moore (GUY)	Lewes (ENG)	Free transfer	
29 January 2024	CB	Jay Williams (WAL)	Fulham (ENG)	Undisclosed	

=== Out ===
Date	Pos	Player	To	Fee	Ref
30 June 2023	RW	Enzio Boldewijn (NED)	Eastleigh (ENG)	Rejected Contract	
30 June 2023	CF	Omar Bugiel (LBN)	AFC Wimbledon (ENG)	Released	
30 June 2023	GK	Filip Chalupniczak (POL)	Free agent	Released	
30 June 2023	RB	Roman Charles-Cook (GRN)	Free agent	Released	
30 June 2023	LW	Luke Gambin (MLT)	Free agent	Released	
30 June 2023	CF	Kylian Kouassi (ENG)	Blackpool (ENG)	Compensation	
30 June 2023	CM	Adam Lovatt (ENG)	Hastings United (ENG)	Released	
30 June 2023	LW	Will Randall (ENG)	Notts County (ENG)	Released	
30 June 2023	CB	Matt Ridley (ENG)	Free agent	Released	
30 June 2023	CB	Coby Rowe (ENG)	Aldershot Town (ENG)	Released	
30 June 2023	CM	Alistair Smith (ENG)	Lincoln City (ENG)	Rejected Contract	
30 June 2023	CF	Kwame Thomas (ENG)	Aldershot Town (ENG)	Released	
30 June 2023	CF	Donovan Wilson (ENG)	Grimsby Town (ENG)	Released	
2 August 2023	CM	Gucci Soulya-Osekanongo (ENG)	Enfield Town (ENG)	Free transfer	
11 January 2024	DM	Dominic Gape (ENG)	Free agent	Released	
1 March 2024	CF	Hisham Kasimu (FRA)	Farnborough (ENG)	Undisclosed	

=== Loaned in ===
Date	Pos	Player	Loaned from	Until	Ref
1 August 2023	CF	Aiden O'Brien (IRL)	Shrewsbury Town (ENG)	22 January 2024	
11 August 2023	CF	D'Mani Mellor (ENG)	Wycombe Wanderers (ENG)	31 December 2023	
1 September 2023	GK	Dean Bouzanis (AUS)	Reading (ENG)	End of Season (Note: On 23 January, Bouzanis' loan from Reading was extended until the end of season.)	
1 September 2023	LW	Dion Pereira (ATG)	Luton Town (ENG)	9 January 2024 (Note: On 9 January, Pereira returned to Luton early from his season-long loan.)	
11 January 2024	CM	Charlie Lakin (ENG)	Burton Albion (ENG)	End of season	
15 January 2024	LB	Nino Adom-Malaki (ENG)	Millwall (ENG)	End of season	
15 January 2024	CF	Olly Sanderson (ENG)	Fulham (ENG)	End of season	
25 January 2024	RM	Stephen Duke-McKenna (GUY)	Queens Park Rangers (ENG)	End of season	

=== Loaned out ===
Date	Pos	Player	Loaned to	Until	Ref
4 August 2023	GK	Matt Kerbey (ENG)	Hendon (ENG)	End of season	
31 August 2023	CB	Tobi Ogundega (ENG)	Bognor Regis Town (ENG)	28 September 2023	
8 December 2023	GK	Brad House (ENG)	Hendon (ENG)	8 January 2023	
20 December 2023	CB	Tobi Ogundega (ENG)	Merstham (ENG)		
19 January 2024	CF	Hisham Kasimu (FRA)	Farnborough (ENG)	1 March 2024 (Note: On 1 March, Kasimu's loan to Farnborough was made permanent.)	
23 January 2024	CF	Tope Fadahunsi (ENG)	Hampton & Richmond Borough (ENG)	20 February 2024	
23 March 2024	CF	Lee Angol (ENG)	Woking (ENG)	End of season	

== Pre-season and friendlies ==
On 15 May, Sutton United announced their first three pre-season friendlies, against Havant & Waterlooville, Farnborough and Woking. Three days later, a home friendly against Reading was confirmed. A further two friendlies were later added, against Millwall and Aldershot Town.

Win Draw Loss Fixtures

11 July 2023 Friendly	Havant & Waterlooville	2–3	Sutton United	Havant
19:45 BST	Fall 20'; Deacon 73'	Report	Trialist C 5'; Trialist E 64'; Coley 81'	Stadium: Westleigh Park

15 July 2023 Friendly	Sutton United	2–0	Reading	Sutton
15:00 BST	Trialist F 57'; Trialist C 60'	Report		Stadium: Gander Green Lane

18 July 2023 Friendly	Sutton United	0–3	Millwall	Sutton
19:45 BST		Report	Nisbet 57', 61' (pen.), 75'	Stadium: VBS Community Stadium

22 July 2023 Friendly	Farnborough	1–1	Sutton United	Farnborough
15:00 BST	Pavey 57'	Report	Kasimu 52'	Stadium: Cherrywood Road

25 July 2023 Friendly	Woking	2–0	Sutton United	Woking
19:45 BST	Kellermann 11'; Amond 89'	Report		Stadium: Kingfield Stadium

29 July 2023 Friendly	Sutton United	0–1	Aldershot Town	Sutton
15:00 BST		Report	Tolaj 23'	Stadium: Gander Green Lane

== Competitions ==
=== Overall record ===
Competition	First match	Last match	Starting round	Final position	Record							
Competition	First match	Last match	Starting round	Final position	Pld	W	D	L	GF	GA	GD	Win %
League Two	5 August 2023	May 2024	Matchday 1		46	9	15	22	59	84	−25	19.57
FA Cup	4 November 2023	6 January 2024	First round	Third round	3	2	0	1	6	4	+2	66.67
EFL Cup	8 August 2023	26 September 2023	First round	Third round	3	1	1	1	4	4	+0	33.33
EFL Trophy	19 September 2023	21 November 2023	Group stage	Group Stage	3	0	2	1	2	5	−3	0.00
Total					55	12	18	25	71	97	−26	21.82

Last updated: 27 April 2024
Source: Soccerway

=== League Two ===
==== League table ====
Pos	Team	Pld	W	D	L	GF	GA	GD	Pts	Promotion, qualification or relegation
19	Swindon Town	46	14	12	20	77	83	−6	54	
20	Salford City	46	13	12	21	66	82	−16	51	
21	Grimsby Town	46	11	16	19	57	74	−17	49	
22	Colchester United	46	11	12	23	59	80	−21	45	
23	Sutton United (R)	46	9	15	22	59	84	−25	42	Relegated to National League
24	Forest Green Rovers (R)	46	11	9	26	44	78	−34	42	Relegated to National League

Source: EFL Official Website
Rules for classification: 1) Points; 2) Goal difference; 3) Number of goals scored; 4) Head-to-head results; 5) Wins; 6) Away goals; 7) Penalty points (sec 9.5); 8) 12-point sending off offences
(R) Relegated

==== Results summary ====
Overall								Home						Away					
Pld	W	D	L	GF	GA	GD	Pts	W	D	L	GF	GA	GD	W	D	L	GF	GA	GD
46	9	15	22	59	84	−25	42	5	9	9	33	33	0	4	6	13	26	51	−25

Last updated: 27 April 2024.
Source: Soccerway

==== Results by round ====
Round	1	2	3	4	5	6	7	8	9	10	11	12	13	14	15	16	17	18	19	20	22	23	24	25	26	28	29	30	21^{1}	31	32	33	34	35	27^{2}	36	37	38	39	40	41	42	43	44	45	46
Ground	H	A	H	H	A	H	A	A	H	A	H	H	A	H	A	H	A	H	A	H	A	H	A	A	H	H	A	A	H	H	A	H	A	H	A	A	H	A	A	H	A	H	H	A	H	A
Result	W	L	L	L	L	L	L	L	D	L	L	W	L	L	L	W	D	D	D	D	L	L	W	L	D	D	D	D	L	D	L	L	L	D	W	L	D	L	W	W	W	W	L	D	D	D
Position	1	7	16	20	23	23	23	24	24	24	24	23	24	24	24	24	24	24	24	24	24	24	23	23	23	23	23	23	23	23	23	24	24	24	24	24	24	24	24	23	23	22	22	23	23	23
Points	3	3	3	3	3	3	3	3	4	4	4	7	7	7	7	10	11	12	13	14	14	14	17	17	18	19	20	21	21	22	22	22	22	23	26	26	27	27	30	33	36	39	39	40	41	42

Updated to match(es) played on 27 April 2024. Source: Soccerway
A = Away; H = Home; W = Win; D = Draw; L = Loss; P = Postponed
Notes:
- ^{1} Matchday 21 (vs Harrogate Town) was postponed due a waterlogged pitch.
- ^{2} Matchday 27 (vs Notts County) was postponed due to FA Cup involvement.

==== Matches ====
On 22 June, the EFL League Two fixtures were released.

Win Draw Loss Fixtures

5 August 2023 1	Sutton United	5–1	Notts County	Sutton
15:00 BST	Kizzi 2'; Eastmond (yellow card) 5'; Milsom (yellow card) 6'; Patrick 23', 50'; Goodliffe (yellow card) 45+3'; Beautyman 63'; Smith 78'	Report	Langstaff (yellow card) 5'; Stone (red card) 15'; Bostock (yellow card) 37'; McGoldrick 69'; Baldwin (yellow card) 74'	Stadium: Gander Green Lane; Attendance: 4,010; Referee: Sam Purkiss

12 August 2023 2	Barrow	2–1	Sutton United	Barrow-in-Furness
15:00 BST	Acquah 79'; Proctor 82'	Report	Smith (red card) 13'; Angol 33'; Rose (yellow card) 76'	Stadium: Holker Street; Attendance: 3,003; Referee: Martin Woods

15 August 2023 3	Sutton United	0–1	Gillingham	Sutton
19:45 BST	Angol (yellow card) 5'; Milsom (yellow card) 25'	Report	Nadesan 10'; Coleman (yellow card) 76'	Stadium: Gander Green Lane; Attendance: 3,714; Referee: Scott Tallis

19 August 2023 4	Sutton United	0–3	AFC Wimbledon	Sutton
15:00 BST	Beautyman (yellow card) 45+3'; Goodliffe (yellow card) 74'	Report	Johnson 64'; Al-Hamadi (yellow card) 65'; Pell 80'; Tilley 86'	Stadium: Gander Green Lane; Attendance: 4,719; Referee: David Rock

26 August 2023 5	Newport County	3–1	Sutton United	Newport
15:00 BST	Bennett (yellow card) 43'; Kizzi 70' (o.g.); Charsley 77'; Evans 87'	Report	Coley (yellow card) 45+2'; Angol (yellow card) 45+3'; Patrick 53'; Sowunmi (yellow card) 73'	Stadium: Rodney Parade; Attendance: 3,730; Referee: Matt Corlett

2 September 2023 6	Sutton United	0–1	Forest Green Rovers	Sutton
15:00 BST	Angol (yellow card) 82'	Report	Deeney (yellow card) 3'; Bunker (yellow card) 37', (goal) 63'	Stadium: Gander Green Lane; Attendance: 2,546; Referee: Scott Simpson

9 September 2023 7	Swindon Town	5–3	Sutton United	Swindon
15:00 BST	Young 5', 23'; Cain 16'; Kemp 65'; Godwin-Malife (yellow card) 85'; Hepburn-Murphy 87'	Report	Clay 34'; Goodliffe 39', (yellow card) 90+7'; Milsom (yellow card) 74'; Smith 77'	Stadium: County Ground; Attendance: 8,389; Referee: Ben Atkinson

16 September 2023 8	Accrington Stanley	4–1	Sutton United	Accrington
15:00 BST	Andrews (yellow card) 10'; Leigh 45+1' (pen.), 57'; Longelo (yellow card) 49', (goal) 63'; Savin (yellow card) 90'; Pritchard 90+5'	Report	Bouzanis (yellow card) 45'; Patrick 64'	Stadium: Crown Ground; Attendance: 2,036; Referee: Darren Drysdale

23 September 2023 9	Sutton United	1–1	Milton Keynes Dons	Sutton
15:00 BST	Sowunmi 37'	Report	Gilbey 53'; Williams (yellow card) 71'	Stadium: Gander Green Lane; Attendance: 3,288; Referee: Thomas Kirk

30 September 2023 10	Crawley Town	3–0	Sutton United	Crawley
15:00 BST	Campbell 6'; Maguire 53'; Orsi 66'; Kelly (yellow card) 86'	Report	O'Brien (yellow card) 65'; Eastmond (yellow card) 77'; Goodliffe (yellow card) 90+2'	Stadium: Broadfield Stadium; Attendance: 3,559; Referee: Paul Howard

3 October 2023 11	Sutton United	0–2	Salford City	Sutton
19:45 BST	Kizzi (yellow card) 12'	Report	Smith (yellow card) 23', (goal) 54'; Bolton (yellow card) 44'; N'Mai 65'; Lund (yellow card) 77'	Stadium: Gander Green Lane; Attendance: 2,031; Referee: Lee Swabey

7 October 2023 12	Sutton United	4–0	Walsall	Sutton
15:00 BST	Patrick 6'; Smith 12', 37'; Riley 27' (o.g.)	Report		Stadium: Gander Green Lane; Attendance: 3,009; Referee: Ed Duckworth

14 October 2023 13	Doncaster Rovers	4–1	Sutton United	Doncaster
15:00 BST	Ironside 17' (pen.), 52'; Rowe (yellow card) 56'; Westbrooke 63'; Faal 67'; Nixon (yellow card) 73'	Report	N'Guessan (yellow card) 29'; Kizzi (yellow card) 34'; Smith (yellow card) 90+5', (goal) 90+9'	Stadium: Eco-Power Stadium; Attendance: 6,473; Referee: Declan Bourne

21 October 2023 14	Sutton United	2–3	Morecambe	Sutton
15:00 BST	Coley (yellow card) 45'; Smith 45+5'; Goodliffe 62'	Report	Mellon 31' (pen.); Mayor 45+3'; Tutonda (yellow card) 72'; Senior 90+1'; Love (yellow card) 90+6'	Stadium: Gander Green Lane; Attendance: 2,603; Referee: Neil Hair

24 October 2023 15	Wrexham	2–1	Sutton United	Wrexham
19:45 BST	Mullin 14', (yellow card) 90+4'; Tunnicliffe (yellow card) 89'; Lee 89'; McClean (yellow card) 90+6'	Report	O'Brien 59'	Stadium: Racecourse Ground; Attendance: 10,190; Referee: Seb Stockbridge

28 October 2023 16	Sutton United	2–1	Bradford City	Sutton
15:00 BST	Coley 4'; Goodliffe (yellow card) 73'; Smith (yellow card) 81'; Beautyman 87'	Report	Cook 57', (yellow card) 66'	Stadium: Gander Green Lane; Attendance: 2,866; Referee: Oliver Langford

11 November 2023 17	Colchester United	1–1	Sutton United	Colchester
15:00 GMT	Dallison (yellow card) 74'; Read (yellow card) 78', (goal) 80'; McGeehan (yellow card) 90+4'	Report	Kizzi (yellow card) 20'; Smith (yellow card) 43'; Beautyman (yellow card) 44'; John (yellow card) 72'; Sowunmi 90+5'	Stadium: Colchester Community Stadium; Attendance: 3,732; Referee: Peter Wright

18 November 2023 18	Sutton United	1–1	Tranmere Rovers	Sutton
15:00 GMT	Smith (yellow card) 45+1'; Coley (yellow card) 82'; John 88'	Report	Goodliffe 17' (o.g.); Wood (yellow card) 66'	Stadium: Gander Green Lane; Attendance: 3,548; Referee: Lee Swabey

25 November 2023 19	Grimsby Town	1–1	Sutton United	Cleethorpes
15:00 GMT	Pyke 19'	Report	Smith 45+5'	Stadium: Blundell Park; Attendance: 5,456; Referee: Matt Corlett

28 November 2023 20	Sutton United	1–1	Crewe Alexandra	Sutton
19:45 GMT	John 28'; Coley (yellow card) 82'; Pereira (yellow card) 88'	Report	Baker-Richardson 17'; Cooney (yellow card) 45'	Stadium: Gander Green Lane; Attendance: 2,233; Referee: John Busby

16 December 2023 22	Stockport County	8–0	Sutton United	Stockport
15:00 GMT	Croasdale 6', 20'; Wootton 12'; Madden 23', 53', 90+3' (pen.); Cotterill 69'; Olaofe 86'	Report	Beautyman (yellow card) 15'	Stadium: Edgeley Park; Attendance: 8,703; Referee: Adam Herczeg

23 December 2023 23	Sutton United	0–2	Mansfield Town	Sutton
15:00 GMT	Hart (yellow card) 61'	Report	Quinn 25'; Akins 75'; Clarke (yellow card) 82'	Stadium: Gander Green Lane; Attendance: 2,762; Referee: Alex Chilowicz

26 December 2023 24	AFC Wimbledon	0–1	Sutton United	Wimbledon
15:00 GMT	Biler (yellow card) 33'; Bugiel (yellow card) 69'; Currie (yellow card) 76'	Report	Goodliffe (yellow card) 44'; Patrick (yellow card) 55'; Sowunmi 62'; Clay (yellow card) 79'	Stadium: Plough Lane; Attendance: 8,575; Referee: Sam Purkiss

29 December 2023 25	Gillingham	1–0	Sutton United	Gillingham
15:00 GMT	Coleman (yellow card) 36'; Malone 72'	Report	Goodliffe (yellow card) 9'; Smith (red card) 26'; Hart (yellow card) 83'; Clay (yellow card) 84'	Stadium: Priestfield Stadium; Attendance: 6,334; Referee: David Rock

1 January 2024 26	Sutton United	1–1	Newport County	Sutton
15:00 GMT	Coley (yellow card) 34'; Fadahunsi 90'	Report	McLoughlin 79'	Stadium: Gander Green Lane; Attendance: 2,737; Referee: Alan Young

13 January 2024 28	Sutton United	2–2	Barrow	Sutton
15:00 GMT	Beautyman (yellow card) 30' (goal) 44', 53'	Report	Whitfield 36'; Canavan 73'	Stadium: Gander Green Lane; Attendance: 2,940; Referee: Paul Howard

23 January 2024 29	Mansfield Town	1–1	Sutton United	Mansfield
19:45 GMT	Brunt (yellow card) 21'; Quinn (yellow card) 29'; Maris 35'	Report	Angol 8'; Kizzi (yellow card) 28'	Stadium: Field Mill; Attendance: 6,490; Referee: Edward Duckworth
Note: Fixture was initially scheduled for 20 January, but was postponed due to a frozen pitch.

27 January 2024 30	Walsall	1–1	Sutton United	Walsall
15:00 GMT	Okagbue (yellow card) 15'; Daniels 18'; Knowles (yellow card) 62'; Evans (yellow card) 69'; Hutchinson (yellow card) 80'; Comley (yellow card) 90+2'	Report	John (yellow card) 9'; Eastmond 23'; Beautyman (yellow card) 29'; N'Guessan (yellow card) 90+4'	Stadium: Bescot Stadium; Attendance: 5,094; Referee: Ross Joyce

30 January 2024 21	Sutton United	1–2	Harrogate Town	Sutton
19:45 GMT	Kizzi (yellow card) 81'; Jackson 87'	Report	Dooley (yellow card) 33'; Burrell (yellow card) 53'; Muldoon 58', 75'; Sutton (yellow card) 67'	Stadium: Gander Green Lane; Attendance: 2,482; Referee: Jacob Miles
Note: Fixture was originally scheduled for 9 December, but was postponed due to a waterlogged pitch.

3 February 2024 31	Sutton United	1–1	Doncaster Rovers	Sutton
15:00 GMT	Kizzi (yellow card) 39'; Eastmond 73'; Beautyman (yellow card) 90+5'	Report	Waters (yellow card) 1'; Wood (yellow card) 36'; Broadbent (yellow card) 65'; Ironside 90+6' (pen.)	Stadium: Gander Green Lane; Attendance: 3,021; Referee: Scott Simpson

10 February 2024 32	Morecambe	1–0	Sutton United	Morecambe
15:00 GMT	Garner 4' (yellow card) 24'; Stokes (yellow card) 45+3'; Senior (yellow card) 65'; Edwards (yellow card) 90+3'	Report	Adom-Malaki (yellow card) 28'; Angol (yellow card) 45+3'; Jackson (yellow card) 72'; Hart (yellow card) 90+3'	Stadium: Mazuma Stadium; Attendance: 4,045; Referee: Peter Wright

13 February 2024 33	Sutton United	1–2	Wrexham	Sutton
19:45 GMT	Adom-Malaki (yellow card) 8'; Eastmond (yellow card) 51'; Lakin 76'; Sanderson (yellow card) 78'	Report	Boyle 45+3'; Lee 85'	Stadium: Gander Green Lane; Attendance: 4,831; Referee: Daniel Middleton

17 February 2024 34	Bradford City	1–0	Sutton United	Bradford
15:00 GMT	Tomkinson (yellow card) 45+1'; Kavanagh 54'	Report	Angol (yellow card) 40'; Bouzanis (yellow card) 90'	Stadium: Valley Parade; Attendance: 16,697; Referee: Marc Edwards

24 February 2024 35	Sutton United	1–1	Colchester United	Sutton
15:00 GMT	Lakin 18'; Eastmond (yellow card) 32'; Smith (penalty missed) 80'; Goodliffe (yellow card) 88'	Report	McGeehan 7'; Richardson (yellow card) 36'; Read (yellow card) 75'; Iandolo (yellow card) 90+6'	Stadium: Gander Green Lane; Attendance: 3,472; Referee: Ben Speedie

27 February 2024 27	Notts County	3–4	Sutton United	Nottingham
19:45 GMT	Langstaff 13' (pen.); Crowley 33', 70'; O'Brien (yellow card) 68'	Report	Jackson 6'; Smith 16'; Adom-Malaki (yellow card) 22'; Goodliffe (yellow card) 31'; Sanderson 64'; Lakin (yellow card) 51', (goal) 77' (pen.); Hart (yellow card) 81'; Clay (yellow card) 90+3'	Stadium: Meadow Lane; Attendance: 7,776; Referee: Ollie Yates
Note: Fixture was originally scheduled for 6 January, but was postponed due to FA Cup involvement.

2 March 2024 36	Tranmere Rovers	1–0	Sutton United	Birkenhead
15:00 GMT	Walker (yellow card) 16'; Saunders (yellow card) 37'; Jennings (yellow card) 15', (penalty missed) 55'; Apter 87'	Report	Adom-Malaki (yellow card) 15'; Lakin (yellow card) 65'; Coley (yellow card) 69'	Stadium: Prenton Park; Attendance: 5,423; Referee: Ruebyn Ricardo

9 March 2024 37	Sutton United	1–1	Grimsby Town	Sutton
15:00 GMT	Eastmond (yellow card) 82'; Lakin 88' (pen.)	Report	Obikwu 44'; Thompson (yellow card) 54'; Rose (yellow card) 80'; Rodgers (yellow card) 82'	Stadium: Gander Green Lane; Attendance: 3,346; Referee: Alex Chilowicz

12 March 2024 38	Crewe Alexandra	1–0	Sutton United	Crewe
19:45 GMT	Nevitt 71'; Austerfeld (yellow card) 90+1'	Report	Sowunmi (yellow card) 42'; Beautyman (yellow card) 48'; Kizzi (yellow card) 77'; Duke-McKenna (yellow card) 90+1'	Stadium: Gresty Road; Attendance: 3,562; Referee: Andrew Humphries

16 March 2024 39	Forest Green Rovers	0–1	Sutton United	Nailsworth
15:00 GMT	Robson (yellow card) 57'	Report	Coley 39'	Stadium: The New Lawn; Attendance: 2,664; Referee: Ben Toner

23 March 2024 40	Sutton United	3–1	Accrington Stanley	Sutton
15:00 GMT	Smith 16', (yellow card) 32'; Sowunmi 68'; Adom-Malaki 74'	Report	Bickerstaff 85'; Adedoyin (yellow card) 90+1'	Stadium: Gander Green Lane; Attendance: 3,265; Referee: Tom Nield

29 March 2024 41	Salford City	1–2	Sutton United	Salford
15:00 GMT	Watson 50'; Vassell (yellow card) 90'	Report	Smith (yellow card) 20'; Sanderson 45+2', 63', (yellow card) 56'; N'Guessan (yellow card) 88'; Beautyman (yellow card) 90+4'	Stadium: Moor Lane; Attendance: 2,983; Referee: Paul Howard

1 April 2024 42	Sutton United	3–1	Swindon Town	Sutton
15:00 BST	Lakin 9'; Bycroft 48' (o.g.); Sowunmi (yellow card) 67'; Smith 70'; Patrick (yellow card) 81'	Report	Brewitt (yellow card) 25'; Glatzel 90+3'	Stadium: Gander Green Lane; Attendance: 3,630; Referee: Thomas Kirk

6 April 2024 43	Sutton United	1–3	Stockport County	Sutton
15:00 BST	Lakin 34' (pen.); Sowunmi (yellow card) 44'; Kizzi (yellow card) 45+5'; Hart (yellow card) 66'	Report	Madden 3', 30', 45+1'; Olaofe (yellow card) 25'; Touray (yellow card) 33'	Stadium: Gander Green Lane; Attendance: 3,852; Referee: Sunny Sukhvir Gill

13 April 2024 44	Harrogate Town	2–2	Sutton United	Harrogate
15:00 BST	Foulds (yellow card) 34'; Thomson 49'; Muldoon 80'	Report	Eastmond (yellow card) 20'; Beautyman 45+1'; Moore 87'; Hart (yellow card) 90+3'	Stadium: Wetherby Road; Attendance: 2,526; Referee: Adam Herczeg

20 April 2024 45	Sutton United	2–2	Crawley Town	Sutton
15:00 BST	Hart (yellow card) 17'; Lakin 48'; Sowunmi (yellow card) 77'; Sanderson 79'	Report	Kelly 42', (yellow card) 90+8'; Lolos 90+1'	Stadium: Gander Green Lane; Attendance: 4,675; Referee: Lewis Smith

27 April 2024 46	Milton Keynes Dons	4–4	Sutton United	Milton Keynes
15:00 BST	Payne 14'; Gilbey 41'; Tezgel 60'; O'Hora (yellow card) 67'; Harrison 70', (yellow card) 90+6'	Report	Lakin 62'; Eastmond (yellow card) 65'; Hart (yellow card) 67'; Duke-McKenna 50', 75'; Smith 90+1'	Stadium: Stadium MK; Attendance: 8,685; Referee: Thomas Parsons

=== FA Cup ===
Sutton were drawn at home to AFC Fylde in the first round and to either Barnsley or Horsham in the second round. On 14 November, Barnsley won their replay 3–0 and were confirmed as the opponents for the U's, However Barnsley were removed from the competition for fielding an ineligible player, therefore Horsham are now the second round visitors. In the third round, the U's were drawn away to Plymouth Argyle.

Win Draw Loss Fixtures

4 November 2023 First round	Sutton United	2–1	AFC Fylde	Sutton
15:00 GMT	Smith (yellow card) 55' (goal) 62', 67'	Report	Ustabasi 45+1'	Stadium: Gander Green Lane; Attendance: 1,262; Referee: James Durkin

2 December 2023 Second round	Sutton United	3–0	Horsham	Sutton
15:00 GMT	Clay (yellow card) 52'; Kizzi (yellow card) 60'; Pereira 64', 74'; Patrick 89'	Report		Stadium: Gander Green Lane; Attendance: 4,283; Referee: Scott Tallis

6 January 2024 Third round	Plymouth Argyle	3–1	Sutton United	Plymouth
15:00 GMT	Cundle 18'; Edwards (yellow card) 65'; Hardie 68' (pen.); Whittaker 90+1'	Report	Kizzi (yellow card) 34'; Angol 50'; Clay (yellow card) 60'	Stadium: Home Park; Attendance: 15,643; Referee: Will Finnie

=== EFL Cup ===
U's were drawn at home to Cambridge United in the first round, and away to Wycombe Wanderers in the second round and Port Vale in the third round.

Win Draw Loss Fixtures

8 August 2023 First round	Sutton United	2–2 (6–5 p)	Cambridge United	Sutton
19:45 BST	Smith 38'; Beautyman 82' (pen.)	Report	Okenabirhie 18', 60' (pen.)	Stadium: Gander Green Lane; Attendance: 1,761; Referee: Daniel Middleton
	Penalties
	Eastmond (penalty scored); Angol (penalty scored); Milsom (penalty scored); Goodliffe (penalty missed); Kashket (penalty scored); Patrick (penalty scored); O'Brien (penalty scored)		Ahadme (penalty scored); Lankester (penalty scored); Andrew (penalty scored); Thomas (penalty missed); Digby (penalty scored); Janneh (penalty scored); Dunk (penalty missed)

29 August 2023 Second round	Wycombe Wanderers	0–1	Sutton United	High Wycombe
19:45 BST	Low (yellow card) 39'; Leahy (yellow card) 50'	Report	O'Brien 19'; Coley (yellow card) 58'; Sowunmi (yellow card) 77'	Stadium: Adams Park; Attendance: 1,778; Referee: Christopher Pollard

26 September 2023 Third round	Port Vale	2–1	Sutton United	Stoke-on-Trent
19:45 BST	Thomas 49'; Ojo 83'; Chislett (yellow card) 90+5'	Report	Angol (yellow card) 6'; Kizzi (yellow card) 32'; Goodliffe (yellow card) 56'; Kasimu 70'; O'Brien (yellow card) 80'	Stadium: Vale Park; Attendance: 4,113; Referee: Will Finnie

=== EFL Trophy ===
In the group stage, Sutton were drawn in alongside Charlton Athletic, Crawley Town and Aston Villa U21.

Pos	Div	Team	Pld	W	PW	PL	L	GF	GA	GD	Pts	Qualification
1	L2	Crawley Town	3	2	0	1	0	7	5	+2	7	Advance to Round 2
2	L1	Charlton Athletic	3	2	0	0	1	10	6	+4	6	Advance to Round 2
3	L2	Sutton United	3	0	1	1	1	2	5	−3	3	
4	ACA	Aston Villa U21	3	0	1	0	2	6	9	−3	2	

Updated to match(es) played on 21 November 2023. Source: EFL.com

Win Draw Loss Fixtures

19 September 2023 Group stage	Sutton United	2–2 (4–5 p)	Aston Villa U21	Sutton
19:45 BST	Angol (yellow card) 28'; Pereira (yellow card) 39'; Sowunmi (yellow card) 54'; Kasimu 79'; Beautyman 90+10'	Report	O'Reilly 6' (pen.); Kellyman (yellow card) 56', (goal) 68'	Stadium: Gander Green Lane; Attendance: 859; Referee: Jacob Miles
	Penalties
	Beautyman (penalty scored); Aiden O'Brien (penalty scored); Milsom (penalty missed); N'Guessan (penalty scored); Patrick (penalty scored)		Munroe (penalty scored); Rowe (penalty scored); Patterson (penalty scored); Moore (penalty scored); Broggio (penalty scored)

10 October 2023 Group stage	Sutton United	0–0 (5–4 p)	Crawley Town	Sutton
19:45 BST	Angol (yellow card) 71'	Report	Khaleel (yellow card) 12'; Roles (yellow card) 76'	Stadium: Gander Green Lane; Attendance: 928; Referee: Kirsty Dowle
	Penalties
	N'Guessan (penalty scored); Angol (penalty scored); Beautyman (penalty scored); Fadahunsi (penalty scored); Coley (penalty scored)		Adeyemo (penalty scored); Roles (penalty scored); Henry (penalty scored); Wright (penalty scored); Forster (penalty missed)

21 November 2023 Group stage	Charlton Athletic	3–0	Sutton United	Charlton
19:00 GMT	Blackett-Taylor 11' (penalty missed) 45+2'; McGrandles 50'; May 68'	Report		Stadium: The Valley; Attendance: 1,377; Referee: Carl Brook

== Squad statistics ==
=== Appearances ===
As of match played 27 April 2024

No.	Pos.	Nat.	Name	EFL League Two		EFL Cup		EFL Trophy		FA Cup		Total	
No.	Pos.	Nat.	Name	Apps	Starts	Apps	Starts	Apps	Starts	Apps	Starts	Apps	Starts
1	GK	(England)	Jack Rose	8	7	3	2	1	1	0	0	12	10
3	DF	(England)	Nino Adom-Malaki	18	18	0	0	0	0	0	0	18	18
4	DF	(England)	Omar Sowunmi	35	30	3	2	2	2	2	2	42	36
5	DF	(England)	Ben Goodliffe	30	29	3	2	3	2	2	2	38	35
6	DF	(England)	Louis John	17	10	2	2	1	0	1	1	21	13
7	MF	(England)	Josh Coley	39	30	3	2	3	1	3	3	48	36
8	MF	(England)	Christian N'Guessan	35	20	2	2	3	1	3	2	43	25
9	FW	(England)	Harry Smith	37	34	2	2	1	1	2	2	42	39
10	MF	(England)	Harry Beautyman	41	30	3	2	3	2	3	3	50	37
11	MF	(England)	Omari Patrick	35	21	3	3	2	1	3	0	43	25
14	MF	(England)	Craig Dundas	0	0	0	0	2	0	1	0	3	0
15	MF	(England)	Craig Eastmond	23	18	2	1	0	0	1	0	26	19
16	MF	(England)	Craig Clay	27	19	2	2	2	2	3	3	34	26
17	FW	(England)	D'Mani Mellor	5	0	0	0	2	2	1	0	8	2
18	FW	(Antigua and Barbuda)	Dion Pereira	14	4	1	1	1	1	1	1	17	7
19	FW	(England)	Tope Fadahunsi	11	2	0	0	2	2	2	0	15	4
20	FW	(England)	Scott Kashket	7	4	2	0	1	1	0	0	10	5
21	GK	(Australia)	Dean Bouzanis	25	25	0	0	0	0	3	3	28	28
22	DF	(England)	Joe Kizzi	45	44	3	2	2	2	3	3	53	51
23	DF	(England)	Ryan Jackson	37	30	2	2	3	3	3	2	45	37
24	DF	(England)	Robert Milsom	17	12	2	2	3	2	2	2	24	18
25	GK	(England)	Steve Arnold	15	14	1	1	2	2	0	0	18	17
26	MF	(England)	Dominic Gape	4	4	0	0	1	1	2	1	7	6
27	FW	(Guyana)	Deon Moore	11	3	0	0	0	0	0	0	11	3
29	FW	(France)	Hisham Kasimu	6	1	1	0	2	2	1	0	10	3
31	MF	(England)	Charlie Lakin	21	19	0	0	0	0	0	0	21	19
33	FW	(England)	Lee Angol	26	14	3	1	2	2	3	1	34	18
35	DF	(England)	Jack Taylor	2	1	0	0	0	0	0	0	2	1
38	FW	(England)	Olly Sanderson	20	13	0	0	0	0	0	0	20	13
40	FW	(Republic of Ireland)	Aiden O'Brien	23	16	3	2	1	0	2	2	29	20
42	DF	(England)	Sam Hart	30	25	0	0	1	1	0	0	31	26
43	FW	(England)	Vinnie Tume	2	0	0	0	0	0	0	0	2	0
50	MF	(Guyana)	Stephen Duke-McKenna	16	6	0	0	0	0	0	0	16	6
Total				46		3		3		3		55	

=== Goals ===
As of match played 27 April 2024

Rank	Pos.	No.	Player	EFL League Two	EFL Cup	EFL Trophy	FA Cup	Total
1	FW	9	(England) Harry Smith	11	1	0	2	14
2	MF	31	(England) Charlie Lakin	8	0	0	0	8
3	MF	10	(England) Harry Beautyman	5	1	1	0	7
4	FW	11	(England) Omari Patrick	5	0	0	1	6
5	DF	4	(England) Omar Sowunmi	4	0	0	0	4
5	FW	38	(England) Olly Sanderson	4	0	0	0	4
7	FW	33	(England) Lee Angol	2	0	0	1	3
8	DF	5	(England) Ben Goodliffe	2	0	0	0	2
8	DF	6	(England) Louis John	2	0	0	0	2
8	MF	7	(England) Josh Coley	2	0	0	0	2
8	MF	15	(England) Craig Eastmond	2	0	0	0	2
8	FW	18	(Antigua and Barbuda) Dion Pereira	0	0	0	2	2
8	DF	23	(England) Ryan Jackson	2	0	0	0	2
8	FW	29	(France) Hisham Kasimu	0	1	1	0	2
8	FW	40	(Republic of Ireland) Aiden O'Brien	1	1	0	0	2
8	MF	50	(Guyana) Stephen Duke-McKenna	2	0	0	0	2
17	DF	3	(England) Nino Adom-Malaki	1	0	0	0	1
17	MF	16	(England) Craig Clay	1	0	0	0	1
17	FW	19	(England) Tope Fadahunsi	1	0	0	0	1
17	DF	22	(England) Joe Kizzi	1	0	0	0	1
17	FW	27	(Guyana) Deon Moore	1	0	0	0	1
	Own goals			2	0	0	0	2
	Total			59	4	2	6	71

=== Assists ===
As of match played 27 April 2024

Rank	Pos.	No.	Player	EFL League Two	EFL Cup	EFL Trophy	FA Cup	Total
1	MF	7	(England) Josh Coley	6	1	0	1	8
1	FW	40	(Republic of Ireland) Aiden O'Brien	5	0	1	2	8
3	FW	9	(England) Harry Smith	5	0	0	1	6
4	MF	31	(England) Charlie Lakin	5	0	0	0	5
4	DF	22	(England) Joe Kizzi	3	0	0	1	4
6	DF	4	(England) Omar Sowunmi	2	0	1	0	3
7	MF	16	(England) Craig Clay	2	0	0	0	2
7	DF	24	(England) Robert Milsom	2	0	0	0	2
7	MF	50	(Guyana) Stephen Duke-McKenna	2	0	0	0	2
10	MF	8	(England) Christian N'Guessan	1	0	0	0	1
10	MF	10	(England) Harry Beautyman	1	0	0	0	1
10	FW	11	(England) Omari Patrick	1	0	0	0	1
10	FW	19	(England) Tope Fadahunsi	1	0	0	0	1
10	FW	38	(England) Olly Sanderson	1	0	0	0	1
	Total			37	1	2	5	45

=== Clean sheets ===
As of match played 27 April 2024

No.	Player	EFL League Two	EFL Cup	EFL Trophy	FA Cup	Total
1	(England) Jack Rose	0	1	0	0	1
21	(Australia) Dean Bouzanis	2	0	0	1	3
25	(England) Steve Arnold	1	0	1	0	1
	Total	3	1	1	1	6

=== Disciplinary record ===
As of match played 27 April 2024

No.	Pos.	Name	EFL League Two			EFL Cup			EFL Trophy			FA Cup			Total		
No.	Pos.	Name	Yellow card	(yellow card) (yellow-red card)	Red card	Yellow card	(yellow card) (yellow-red card)	Red card	Yellow card	(yellow card) (yellow-red card)	Red card	Yellow card	(yellow card) (yellow-red card)	Red card	Yellow card	(yellow card) (yellow-red card)	Red card
1	GK	(England) Jack Rose	1	0	0	0	0	0	0	0	0	0	0	0	1	0	0
3	DF	(England) Nino Adom-Malaki	4	0	0	0	0	0	0	0	0	0	0	0	4	0	0
4	DF	(England) Omar Sowunmi	5	0	0	1	0	0	1	0	0	0	0	0	7	0	0
5	DF	(England) Ben Goodliffe	9	0	0	1	0	0	0	0	0	0	0	0	10	0	0
6	DF	(England) Louis John	2	0	0	0	0	0	0	0	0	0	0	0	2	0	0
7	MF	(England) Josh Coley	6	0	0	1	0	0	0	0	0	0	0	0	7	0	0
8	MF	(England) Christian N'Guessan	3	0	0	0	0	0	0	0	0	0	0	0	3	0	0
9	FW	(England) Harry Smith	6	0	2	0	0	0	0	0	0	1	0	0	7	0	2
10	MF	(England) Harry Beautyman	8	0	0	0	0	0	0	0	0	0	0	0	8	0	0
11	FW	(England) Omari Patrick	2	0	0	0	0	0	0	0	0	0	0	0	2	0	0
15	MF	(England) Craig Eastmond	7	0	0	0	0	0	0	0	0	0	0	0	7	0	0
16	MF	(England) Craig Clay	3	0	0	0	0	0	0	0	0	2	0	0	5	0	0
18	FW	(Antigua and Barbuda) Dion Pereira	1	0	0	0	0	0	1	0	0	0	0	0	2	0	0
21	GK	(Australia) Dean Bouzanis	2	0	0	0	0	0	0	0	0	0	0	0	2	0	0
22	DF	(England) Joe Kizzi	8	0	0	1	0	0	0	0	0	2	0	0	11	0	0
23	DF	(England) Ryan Jackson	1	0	0	0	0	0	0	0	0	0	0	0	1	0	0
24	DF	(England) Robert Milsom	3	0	0	0	0	0	0	0	0	0	0	0	3	0	0
31	MF	(England) Charlie Lakin	2	0	0	0	0	0	0	0	0	0	0	0	2	0	0
33	FW	(England) Lee Angol	5	0	0	1	0	0	2	0	0	0	0	0	8	0	0
38	FW	(England) Olly Sanderson	2	0	0	0	0	0	0	0	0	0	0	0	2	0	0
40	FW	(Republic of Ireland) Aiden O'Brien	1	0	0	1	0	0	0	0	0	0	0	0	2	0	0
42	DF	(England) Sam Hart	8	0	0	0	0	0	0	0	0	0	0	0	8	0	0
50	MF	(Guyana) Stephen Duke-McKenna	1	0	0	0	0	0	0	0	0	0	0	0	1	0	0
Total			88	0	2	6	0	0	4	0	1	4	0	0	103	0	2
