= Brad House =

English association football player (born 1998)

Personal information
- Full name: Bradley Roy House
- Date of birth: 19 October 1998 (age 28)
- Place of birth: Worthing, England
- Height: 1.88 m (6 ft 2 in)
- Position: Goalkeeper

Team information
- Current team: Chatham Town
- Number: 1

Youth career
- –2015: Arsenal
- 2015–2016: West Bromwich Albion

Senior career*
| Years | Team | Apps | (Gls) |
| 2016–2020 | West Bromwich Albion | 0 | (0) |
| 2016 | → Banbury United (loan) | 0 | (0) |
| 2018–2019 | → Chippenham Town (loan) | 16 | (0) |
| 2019 | → Chippenham Town (loan) | 3 | (0) |
| 2020–2024 | Sutton United | 2 | (0) |
| 2020 | → Horsham (dual-reg.) | 9 | (0) |
| 2022–2023 | → Havant & Waterlooville (loan) | 9 | (0) |
| 2023–2024 | → Hendon (loan) | 6 | (0) |
| 2024– | Chatham Town | 6 | (0) |
- * Club domestic league appearances and goals as of 14:21, 10 September 2024 (UTC)

Bradley Roy House (born 19 October 1998) is an English professional footballer who plays as a goalkeeper for Isthmian League Premier Division side Chatham Town.

== Career ==
=== West Bromwich Albion ===
House started his career at Arsenal before a move to West Bromwich Albion in the summer of 2015. In March 2016, he was sent out on a one-month youth loan to Banbury United, where he featured just twice, with both appearances coming in the Buckinghamshire Senior Charity Cup. During the 2018–19 campaign, House was once again sent out on loan, this time joining National League South side, Chippenham Town on a six-month deal. House left West Bromwich Albion in June 2020 following the expiry of his contract.

=== Sutton United ===
Following his release, House eventually joined National League club, Sutton United in September 2020 and immediately dual-registered with Horsham.

Ahead of the 2021–22 campaign, House signed a new one-year deal with the club. On 31 August 2021, House made his Sutton debut during an EFL Trophy group-stage tie against Crystal Palace U23s, keeping a clean sheet in the 3–0 victory.

He moved on loan to Havant & Waterlooville in November 2022, before being recalled in January 2023.

In December 2023, House joined Southern Premier Division South club Hendon on a one-month loan deal.

Following Sutton United's relegation at the end of the 2023–24 season, House was released at the end of his contract.

=== Non-League ===
On 6 August 2024, House joined Isthmian League Premier Division side Chatham Town.

== Career statistics ==
As of end of 2024-25 season

Appearances and goals by club, season and competition
| Club | Season | League | | | FA Cup | | EFL Cup | | Other | | Total | |
| Club | Season | Division | Apps | Goals | Apps | Goals | Apps | Goals | Apps | Goals | Apps | Goals |
|---|---|---|---|---|---|---|---|---|---|---|---|---|
| West Bromwich Albion | 2015–16 | Premier League | 0 | 0 | 0 | 0 | 0 | 0 | — | | 0 | 0 |
| West Bromwich Albion | 2016–17 | Premier League | 0 | 0 | 0 | 0 | 0 | 0 | — | | 0 | 0 |
| West Bromwich Albion | 2017–18 | Premier League | 0 | 0 | 0 | 0 | 0 | 0 | — | | 0 | 0 |
| West Bromwich Albion | 2018–19 | Championship | 0 | 0 | — | | 0 | 0 | 0 | 0 | 0 | 0 |
| West Bromwich Albion | 2019–20 | Championship | 0 | 0 | 0 | 0 | 0 | 0 | — | | 0 | 0 |
| West Bromwich Albion | Total | | 0 | 0 | 0 | 0 | 0 | 0 | 0 | 0 | 0 | 0 |
| Banbury United (loan) | 2015–16 | Southern League Division One South & West | 0 | 0 | — | | — | | 0 | 0 | 0 | 0 |
| Chippenham Town (loan) | 2018–19 | National League South | 19 | 0 | 4 | 0 | — | | 2 (Note: Appearances in the FA Trophy) | 0 | 25 | 0 |
| Sutton United | 2020–21 | National League | 0 | 0 | — | | — | | — | | 0 | 0 |
| Sutton United | 2021–22 | League Two | 0 | 0 | 0 | 0 | 0 | 0 | 3 (Note: Appearances in the EFL Trophy) | 0 | 3 | 0 |
| Sutton United | Total | | 0 | 0 | 0 | 0 | 0 | 0 | 3 | 0 | 3 | 0 |
| Horsham (dual-reg.) | 2020–21 | Isthmian League Premier Division | 9 | 0 | 2 | 0 | — | | 1 | 0 | 12 | 0 |
| Havant & Waterlooville (loan) | 2022–23 | National League South | 9 | 0 | 0 | 0 | — | | 1 | 0 | 10 | 0 |
| Hendon (loan) | 2023–24 | Southern League Premier Division South | 6 | 0 | 0 | 0 | — | | 2 | 0 | 8 | 0 |
| Chatham Town | 2024–25 | Isthmian League Premier Division | 6 | 0 | 2 | 0 | 0 | 0 | 0 | 0 | 6 | 0 |
| Hemel Hempstead Town | 2024–25 | National League South | 10 | 0 | 0 | 0 | 0 | 0 | 0 | 0 | 10 | 0 |
| Career total | | | 59 | 0 | 6 | 0 | 0 | 0 | 9 | 0 | 74 | 0 |
