= Hisham Kasimu =

French footballer (born 1997)

Personal information
- Full name: Hisham Kasimu
- Date of birth: 28 July 1997 (age 29)
- Place of birth: France
- Position: Forward

Team information
- Current team: Chesham United
- Number: 9

Youth career
- Brentwood Town

Senior career*
Years	Team	Apps	(Gls)
2017–2019	Team Solent	57	(62)
2018–2019	→ Blackfield & Langley (dual-registration)		
2019–2020	Blackfield & Langley	29	(8)
2020–2022	AFC Totton	38	(24)
2022–2023	Farnborough	20	(9)
2023–2024	Sutton United	6	(0)
2024	→ Farnborough (loan)	14	(1)
2024	Enfield Town	6	(1)
2024–2025	Farnborough	9	(1)
2025	Enfield Town	15	(1)
2025–2026	AFC Totton	13	(2)
2026	→ Gosport Borough (dual-registration)	19	(8)
2026–	Chesham United	0	(0)
- * Club domestic league appearances and goals as of 17:04, 15 July 2026 (UTC)

Hisham Kasimu (born 28 July 1997) is a French professional footballer who plays as a forward for National League South club Chesham United.

== Career ==
Kasimu began his career at Brentwood Town before opting to go study at Solent University. During this period, he also featured for the university's football side, Team Solent in the Wessex League, scoring 62 goals in 57 games in the league between 2017 and 2019. Kasimu signed for Blackfield & Langley permanently after spending a large duration of the 2018–19 campaign at the club on a dual-registration basis in between his studies. During the club's debut season in the Southern League Premier Division South campaign, he scored 12 goals in 38 appearances, before making the move to AFC Totton ahead of the 2021–22 season following Blackfield & Langley's resignation back to the Wessex League. Kasimu spent two years at AFC Totton, scoring 31 times in all competitions, before moving to newly-promoted Farnborough of the National League South in May 2022.

He signed for English Football League club Sutton United in January 2023. On 15 August 2023, Kasimu made his long-awaited debut, featuring for the final 15 minutes during Sutton's 1–0 home defeat to Gillingham. In January 2024, he returned to Farnborough on loan until the end of the season.

On 9 August 2024, Kasimu joined newly promoted National League South side Enfield Town. In September 2024, he returned to Farnborough. He departed Farnborough in January 2025. A few weeks later, Kasimu returned to Enfield Town following his release from Farnborough.

In August 2025, Kasimu rejoined AFC Totton in time for their first ever season in the National League South, following promotion via the Southern League Premier Division South playoffs the previous season. He scored on his second debut for The Stags, bagging the third goal in their first home game of the season as they beat Tonbridge Angels 3-0.

After a spell dual-registered with Gosport Borough in the second half of the 2025–26 season, Kasimu agreed to join Chesham United in June 2026.

== Career statistics ==
As of match played 25 April 2026

Appearances and goals by club, season and competition
Club	Season	League			FA Cup		EFL Cup		Other		Total	
Club	Season	Division	Apps	Goals	Apps	Goals	Apps	Goals	Apps	Goals	Apps	Goals
Team Solent	2017–18	Wessex League Premier Division	26	32	0	0	—		0	0	26	32
Team Solent	2018–19	Wessex League Premier Division	31	30	1	0	—		0	0	32	30
Team Solent	Total		57	62	1	0	—		0	0	58	62
Blackfield & Langley (dual-reg.)	2018–19	Southern League Division One South	No data currently available									
Blackfield & Langley	2019–20	Southern League Premier Division South	29	8	4	2	—		5 (Note: Two appearances in the Southern League Cup, three appearances and two goals in the FA Trophy)	2	38	12
AFC Totton	2020–21	Southern League Division One South	5	3	0	0	—		1 (Note: Appearance(s) in the FA Trophy.)	0	6	3
AFC Totton	2021–22	Southern League Division One South	33	21	1	0	—		5	7	39	28
AFC Totton	Total		38	24	1	0	—		6	7	45	31
Farnborough	2022–23	National League South	20	9	6	2	—		2	1	28	12
Sutton United	2022–23	League Two	0	0	—		—		—		0	0
Sutton United	2023–24	League Two	6	0	1	0	1	1	2 (Note: Appearance(s) in the EFL Trophy.)	1	10	2
Sutton United	Total		6	0	1	0	1	1	2	1	10	2
Farnborough (loan)	2023–24	National League South	14	1	—		—		—		14	1
Enfield Town	2024–25	National League South	6	1	—		—		—		6	1
Farnborough	2024–25	National League South	9	1	1	0	—		0	0	10	1
Enfield Town	2024–25	National League South	15	1	—		—		—		15	1
AFC Totton	2025–26	National League South	13	2	2	0	—		1	0	16	2
Gosport Borough (dual-reg.)	2025–26	Southern League Premier Division South	19	8	—		—		—		19	8
Chesham United	2026–27	National League South	0	0	0	0	—		0	0	0	0
Career total			226	117	16	4	1	1	16	11	259	133
