= Tope Fadahunsi =

English association football player

Personal information
- Full name: Olusanya Temitope Fadahunsi
- Date of birth: 29 August 1999 (age 27)
- Place of birth: Wandsworth, England
- Position: Forward

Team information
- Current team: Carshalton Athletic

Youth career
- 2007–2015: Watford
- 2016–2017: Tooting & Mitcham United

Senior career*
Years	Team	Apps	(Gls)
2017–2019	Tooting & Mitcham United	27	(1)
2019	PS Kemi		
2019–2022	Loughborough University		
2022–2024	Sutton United	27	(3)
2023	→ Torquay United (loan)	11	(2)
2024	→ Hampton & Richmond Borough (loan)	13	(2)
2024–2025	Prishtina		
2025	Hendon	8	(5)
2025–2026	Chatham Town	37	(11)
2026–	Carshalton Athletic	0	(0)
- * Club domestic league appearances and goals as of 18:50, 16 June 2026 (UTC)

Olusanya Temitope "Tope" Fadahunsi (born 29 August 1999) is an English professional footballer who plays as a forward for Isthmian League Premier Division club Carshalton Athletic.

== Club career ==
Originally starting his career with Watford, Fadahunsi went onto have spells with Tooting & Mitcham United where he played as a right back and Finnish side, PS Kemi before opting to study at Loughborough University, whilst featuring for their first-team.

On 20 July 2022, following a successful trial period, Fadahunsi joined League Two side, Sutton United. On 13 August 2022, he made his debut for the club, making an instant impact, coming off the substitutes bench to score the winner in their 1–0 victory over Barrow. During that same month, he went onto score twice more in all competitions, netting against Mansfield Town and Chelsea U21s. In January 2023, he joined Torquay United on loan until the end of the season. On 23 January 2024, he joined National League South side, Hampton & Richmond Borough on a one-month loan before returning to Sutton United on 20 February 2024 Following Sutton United's relegation at the end of the 2023–24 season, Fadahunsi was released upon the expiration of his contract.

On 15 July 2024, Fadahunsi joined Kosovo Superleague club Prishtina. He returned to England in February 2025, joining Hendon.

In June 2025, Fadahunsi joined Isthmian League Premier Division side Chatham Town. In June 2026, he joined Carshalton Athletic.

== Personal life ==
Born in England, Fadahunsi is of Nigerian and Ghanaian descent.

== Career statistics ==
As of end of 2025–26 season

Appearances and goals by club, season and competition
Club	Season	League			National Cup		League Cup		Other		Total	
Club	Season	Division	Apps	Goals	Apps	Goals	Apps	Goals	Apps	Goals	Apps	Goals
Tooting & Mitcham United	2017–18	Isthmian League Premier Division	13	0	0	0	—		1 (Note: Appearances in the Alan Turvey Trophy)	0	14	0
Tooting & Mitcham United	2018–19	Isthmian League South Central Division	14	1	3	0	—		2	0	19	1
Tooting & Mitcham United	Total		27	1	3	0	—		3	0	33	1
PS Kemi	2019	Kolmonen	No data currently available									
Loughborough University	2019–20	United Counties League Premier Division	No data currently available									
Loughborough University	2020–21	United Counties League Premier Division	12	5	1	0	—		3 (Note: Appearances in the FA Vase)	4	16	9
Loughborough University	2021–22	United Counties League Premier Division North	29	17	2	2	—		7	5	38	24
Loughborough University	Total		41	22	3	2	—		10	9	54	33
Sutton United	2022–23	League Two	16	2	0	0	—		3 (Note: Appearance in the EFL Trophy)	1	19	3
Sutton United	2023–24	League Two	11	1	2	0	0	0	2	0	15	1
Sutton United	Total		27	3	2	0	0	0	5	1	34	4
Torquay United (loan)	2022–23	National League	11	2	—		—		1 (Note: Appearance in the FA Trophy)	0	12	2
Hampton & Richmond Borough (loan)	2023–24	National League South	13	2	—		—		—		13	2
Hendon	2024–25	Isthmian League Premier Division	8	5	0	0	—		1	1	9	6
Chatham Town	2025–26	Isthmian League Premier Division	37	11	5	6	—		9 (Note: Five appearances in FA Trophy, two appearances in Kent Senior Cup, one appearance in Alan Turvey Trophy, one appearance in Isthmian League Premier Division play-offs)	0	51	17
Career total			161	46	13	8	0	0	29	11	203	65
