= Christian N'Guessan =

English footballer

Personal information
- Full name: Christian Dashiell Ruhemann N'Guessan
- Date of birth: 20 October 1998 (age 28)
- Place of birth: Lewisham, England
- Height: 1.86 m (6 ft 1 in)
- Position: Midfielder

Team information
- Current team: Maidenhead United
- Number: 4

Youth career
- –2016: Blackpool

Senior career*
Years	Team	Apps	(Gls)
2016–2017	Blackpool	0	(0)
2016–2017	→ Bamber Bridge (loan)		
2017–2020	Burnley	0	(0)
2020	→ Oldham Athletic (loan)	8	(0)
2021–2023	Ebbsfleet United	67	(0)
2023–2024	Sutton United	35	(0)
2024–2026	Dagenham & Redbridge	71	(1)
2026–	Maidenhead United	0	(0)
- * Club domestic league appearances and goals as of 10:34, 25 March 2026 (UTC)

Christian Dashiell Ruhemann N'Guessan (born 20 October 1998) is an English professional footballer who plays for National League South club Maidenhead United, as a midfielder.

He is the brother of former professional footballer Joseph N'Guessan.

== Club career ==
N'Guessan began his career with Blackpool where he went on to win the North-West Youth Alliance title and Lancashire FA Youth Cup in the 2016–17 season. On 6 December 2016, he made the bench for the first team for an EFL Trophy defeat to Doncaster Rovers on penalties. On 9 December 2016, he signed for Northern Premier League Division One North side Bamber Bridge on a work experience loan.

In July 2017, he signed for Burnley on a two-year deal with the option of a further year, and was placed into the Development Squad. On 2 January 2020, he signed for EFL League Two side Oldham Athletic on loan for the remainder of the season.

In May 2021, N'Guessan joined National League South side Ebbsfleet United after impressing on trial. The 2022–23 season saw Ebbsfleet lift the National League South title, N'Guessan being named in the Team of the Season. On 16 June 2023, it was confirmed that he would be leaving Ebbsfleet to join a Football League club.

On 16 June 2023, N'Guessan signed for League Two club Sutton United. He departed the club following relegation at the end of the 2023–24 season.

On 2 July 2024, N'Guessan joined National League side Dagenham & Redbridge on a two-year deal. He played 83 times for the Daggers in his two years with the club.

In June 2026, Maidenhead United announced the signing of N'Guessan for the 2026-27 season.

== Career statistics ==
As of match played 21 March 2026

Appearances and goals by club, season and competition
Club	Season	League			FA Cup		EFL Cup		Other		Total	
Club	Season	Division	Apps	Goals	Apps	Goals	Apps	Goals	Apps	Goals	Apps	Goals
Blackpool	2016–17	League Two	0	0	0	0	0	0	0	0	0	0
Oldham Athletic (loan)	2019–20	League Two	8	0	—		—		—		8	0
Ebbsfleet United	2021–22	National League South	28	0	0	0	—		2 (Note: Appearance(s) in National League South play-offs)	0	30	0
Ebbsfleet United	2022–23	National League South	39	0	2	0	—		1 (Note: Appearance(s) in FA Trophy)	0	42	0
Ebbsfleet United	Total		67	0	2	0	0	0	3	0	72	0
Sutton United	2023–24	League Two	35	0	3	0	2	0	3 (Note: Appearance(s) in EFL Trophy)	0	43	0
Dagenham & Redbridge	2024–25	National League	40	1	4	0	—		3 (Note: One appearance in FA Trophy, two in National League Cup)	0	47	1
Dagenham & Redbridge	2025–26	National League South	31	0	3	0	—		2	0	36	0
Dagenham & Redbridge	Total		71	1	7	0	—		5	0	83	1
Career total			181	1	12	0	2	0	11	0	205	1

== Honours ==
Ebbsfleet United

- National League South Champions: 2022–23

Individual

- National League South Team of the Season: 2022–23
