= Craig Dundas =

English footballer

Personal information
- Full name: Craig Charles Dundas
- Date of birth: 16 February 1981 (age 45)
- Place of birth: Lambeth, London
- Height: 1.88 m (6 ft 2 in)
- Position: Forward

Team information
- Current team: Epsom & Ewell

Senior career*
Years	Team	Apps	(Gls)
1998–2004	Croydon		
2004–2005	APEP		
2005	Dulwich Hamlet		
2005–2007	Carshalton Athletic		
2007–2009	Sutton United	67	(17)
2009–2010	Hampton & Richmond Borough	41	(6)
2010–2018	Sutton United	298	(64)
2016	→ Tonbridge Angels (loan)		
2018	Hampton & Richmond Borough	15	(3)
2018	Sutton United	4	(0)
2018–2019	Hampton & Richmond Borough	21	(1)
2019–2024	Sutton United	43	(1)
2024–	Epsom & Ewell	48	(6)
- * Club domestic league appearances and goals as of 18:32, 25 April 2026 (UTC)

Craig Charles Dundas (born 16 February 1981) is an English footballer who plays for Epsom & Ewell in the Combined Counties League. He plays as a forward.

== Career ==
Dundas began his career at Croydon, spending six years in the first team before moving on to Dulwich Hamlet and then Carshalton Athletic. He started his first spell with Sutton United in 2007, moving to Hampton & Richmond Borough two years later before returning to Sutton after a season. Dundas then spent eight seasons with Sutton, including a brief loan spell with Tonbridge Angels at the start of the 2016–17 season. He returned to Hampton & Richmond at the start of the 2018–19 season, but briefly returned to Sutton in November before returning to the Beveree the following month.

He returned to Sutton United for a fourth spell at the end of the 2018–19 season. Dundas made his English Football League debut on 11 September 2021 against Stevenage at the age of 40, becoming the oldest player to make their EFL debut since the Second World War. Following Sutton's relegation back to non-league, Dundas departed the club at the end of the 2023–24 season.

At the beginning of the 2024–25 season, aged 43, Dundas dropped down five divisions to join Epsom & Ewell in the Combined Counties League Premier Division South; he made his league debut for the club in a 4–1 defeat at Sandhurst Town on 17 August 2024, a game in which he scored Epsom & Ewell's only goal.

== Coaching career ==
Dundas is a member of the coaching team at Ballers Football Academy in South London, a renowned football development programme established to nurture young football talent.
