= Charlie Lakin =

English footballer (born 1999)

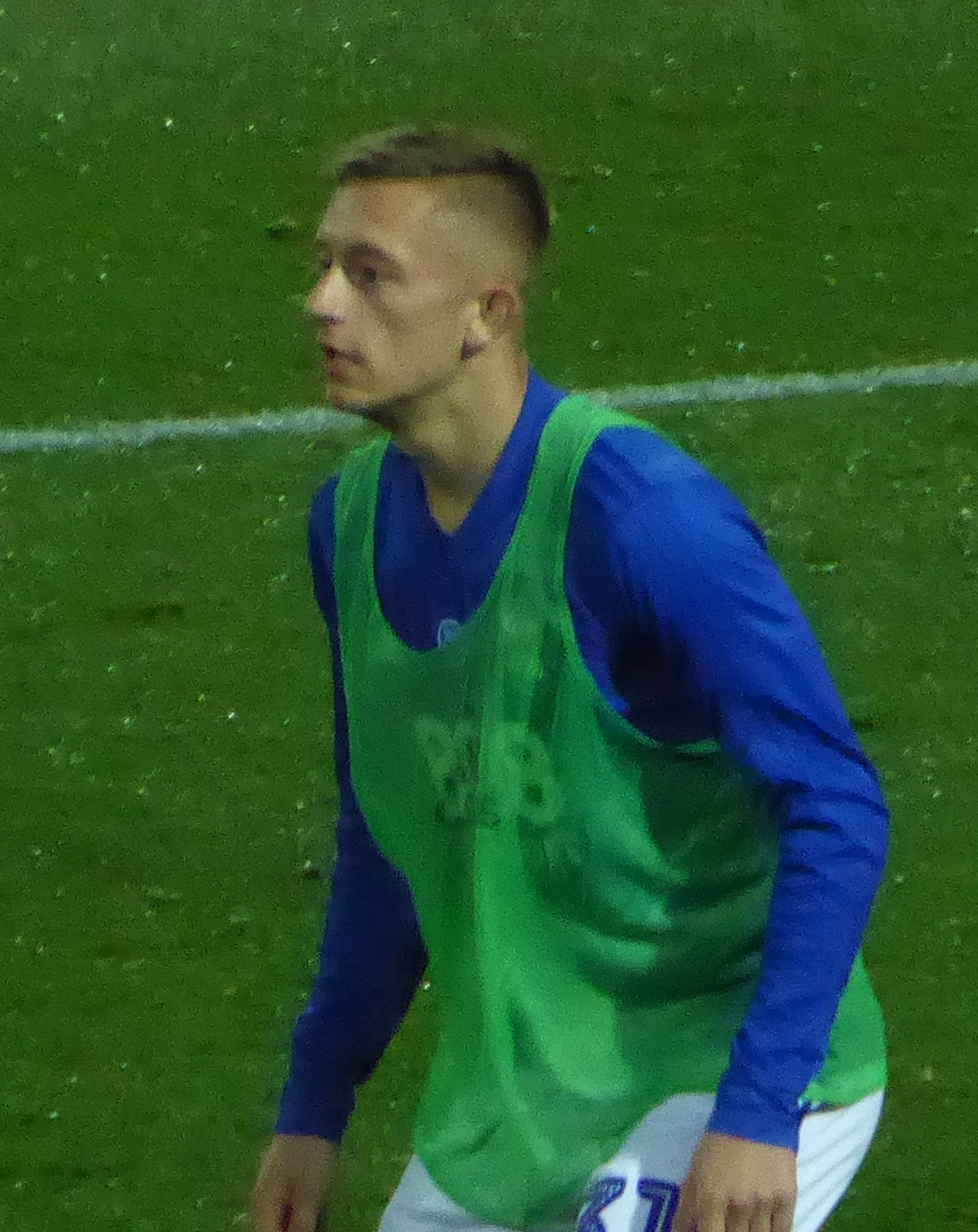
- Lakin pictured in October 2018

Personal information
- Full name: Charlie James Lakin
- Date of birth: 8 May 1999 (age 27)
- Place of birth: Solihull, England
- Height: 6 ft 0 in (1.83 m)
- Position: Midfielder

Team information
- Current team: Barnet
- Number: 8

Youth career
- 200?–2008: Walsall
- 2008–2017: Birmingham City

Senior career*
Years	Team	Apps	(Gls)
2017–2021	Birmingham City	10	(0)
2019–2020	→ Stevenage (loan)	20	(2)
2020–2021	→ Ross County (loan)	19	(3)
2021–2024	Burton Albion	29	(1)
2023	→ Doncaster Rovers (loan)	10	(0)
2023–2024	→ AFC Wimbledon (loan)	6	(0)
2024	→ Sutton United (loan)	21	(7)
2024–2026	Walsall	80	(3)
2026–	Barnet	7	(6)
- * Club domestic league appearances and goals as of 19:11, 19 September 2026 (UTC)

Charlie James Lakin (born 8 May 1999) is an English professional footballer who plays as a midfielder for EFL League Two club Barnet.

He joined Birmingham City as a nine-year-old, went on to make his senior debut for the club in the 2017–18 FA Cup, and played ten times in the 2018–19 Championship. Despite missing two months with injury, Lakin managed 25 appearances on loan at League Two club Stevenage before the 2019–20 season ended prematurely because of the COVID-19 pandemic. He spent the 2020–21 season on loan to Scottish Premiership club Ross County, before leaving Birmingham on a permanent basis for Burton Albion in August 2021. He had loan spells at Doncaster Rovers and AFC Wimbledon in 2023 and Sutton United in 2024.

== Club career ==
=== Birmingham City ===
Lakin was born in Solihull where he attended Langley School. He joined Birmingham City's Academy from Walsall's under-nine team, and took up a scholarship with the club in July 2015. In his first season, he featured regularly for Birmingham's under-18 team. Speaking in January 2017, Academy manager Kristjaan Speakman described Lakin as "a left-sided midfielder [who] has played in a more central position for the Under-18s over the course of this season. He has real box-to-box energy. He can be creative with the ball but also really robust defensively." He finished the season with two goals from 13 appearances in the under-23 team, and signed his first professional contract, of one year, at the end of the 2016–17 season. Lakin was a regular in the under-23s in the 2017–18 season, and was one of two players selected to train with UE Cornellà's first team in October 2017 as part of a proposed relationship between Birmingham City and the Spanish Segunda División B (third-tier) club.

His involvement with Birmingham's first team increased, and on 27 January 2018, he was given a squad number and included among the substitutes for the FA Cup fourth-round visit to Premier League club Huddersfield Town. He remained unused as Birmingham drew the match, but made his senior debut in the replay ten days later. Use of a fourth substitute during extra time of an FA Cup tie, trialled in the later rounds of the 2016–17 edition, was permitted from the first round in 2017–18. Lakin became the first Birmingham player to be used under that arrangement when he replaced Jason Lowe after 101 minutes with his team already 3–1 down; the match finished as a 4–1 defeat. According to the Birmingham Mail, on his first involvement in the match, "he gathered possession on the edge of his own area, surged through his half and threaded a superb pass to Jota which set Blues away on the counter", showing the "sort of technical ability which has made him such a big hit in his first full season at Under 23 level." Two weeks later, Lakin signed a new contract to run until 2020, with a further one-year option in the club's favour.

Lakin made his next appearance in the defeat to Reading in the 2018–19 EFL Cup, and his Football League debut in the next match, replacing Gary Gardner towards the end of a goalless draw at home to Swansea City. His first league start came in a goalless draw away to Sheffield United on 19 September, partnering Gardner in central midfield; the Birmingham Mail marked him 7.5 out of 10, and said he "gave his first pass away – but that was virtually his last mistake. He was as good without the ball as with it and looks to have given [the manager] another option in the middle." He was a regular in the matchday squad until the turn of the year, when a thigh injury kept him out of consideration until March 2019, during which time the appearance-based one-year extension to his contract was ratified.

==== Stevenage ====
Having made one EFL Cup appearance for Birmingham in 2019–20, Lakin joined EFL League Two club Stevenage on 22 August 2019 on loan for the rest of the season. He went straight into the starting eleven for the league visit to Mansfield Town two days later, and played the whole 90 minutes as the match ended goalless. A thigh injury suffered during his debut kept him out for two months: he returned to action on 26 October in a 1–0 win at home to fellow strugglers Morecambe. He scored his first senior goal on 18 January 2020 to round off a 4–0 win away to Cambridge United. He had made 25 appearances in all competitions by the time the League Two season was first suspended and then ended early because of the COVID-19 pandemic.

==== Ross County ====
Lakin started in the opening fixture of Birmingham's 2020–21 season, a 1–0 defeat at home to fourth-tier Cambridge United in the EFL Cup. With several midfielders ahead of him in new head coach Aitor Karanka's pecking order, he was not included in the squad for any Championship matches, and on 5 October 2020, he joined Scottish Premiership club Ross County on 5 October 2020 on loan for the season. He made his debut as a second-half substitute in the Scottish League Cup away to Montrose, who had been 3–0 down but had just pegged the score back to 3–2. Montrose scored again to take the tie to penalties; Lakin converted Ross County's fifth penalty but Montrose's fifth player missed his, so Ross County took the bonus point.

=== Burton Albion ===
On 31 August 2021, Lakin signed a three-year deal with League One club Burton Albion. He went straight into the starting eleven, and marked his third appearance, away to Crewe Alexandra, by being sent off for a second yellow card. He finished the season with 28 appearances, of which about half were as a starter, but in the first half of the 2022–23 campaign, he played in the cups but only rarely in the league.

In January 2023, he joined Doncaster Rovers of League Two on loan for the rest of the season.

Lakin joined another League Two club, AFC Wimbledon, on 1 September 2023 on loan until January 2024. He made ten appearances – six in the league and four in the EFL Trophy – before returning to his parent club on 4 January 2024.

A week later, he returned to League Two on loan to Sutton United until the end of the season. He was a regular in the starting eleven throughout his loan spell, scored eight goals from 21 league appearances, and, according to the club website, "[played] a huge part in keeping our fight against relegation going to the final week of the season." Despite being with Sutton for only half the season, his performances earned both Club and Players' Player of the Season awards.

=== Return to Walsall ===
On 25 June 2024, Lakin agreed to re-join Walsall on a two-year contract, to begin on 1 July after his Burton Albion contract expired. He scored his first goal on 3 September in the EFL Trophy against Birmingham City, his former club; the match ended 1–1, and Walsall won the penalty shoot-out to secure the extra point.

On 6 May 2026, the club announced the player would be leaving in the summer when his contract expired.

=== Barnet ===
In June 2026, Lakin agreed to join fellow League Two club Barnet alongside Walsall teammate Brandon Comley.

== Career statistics ==
As of 19 September 2026

Appearances and goals by club, season and competition
Club	Season	League			National cup (Note: Includes FA Cup, Scottish Cup)		League cup (Note: Includes EFL Cup, Scottish League Cup)		Other		Total	
Club	Season	Division	Apps	Goals	Apps	Goals	Apps	Goals	Apps	Goals	Apps	Goals
Birmingham City	2017–18	Championship	0	0	1	0	0	0	—		1	0
Birmingham City	2018–19	Championship	10	0	0	0	1	0	—		11	0
Birmingham City	2019–20	Championship	0	0	0	0	1	0	—		1	0
Birmingham City	2020–21	Championship	0	0	0	0	1	0	—		1	0
Birmingham City	2021–22	Championship	0	0	0	0	2	0	—		2	0
Birmingham City	Total		10	0	1	0	5	0	—		16	0
Stevenage (loan)	2019–20	League Two	20	2	2	0	—		3 (Note: Appearance(s) in EFL Trophy)	0	25	2
Ross County (loan)	2020–21	Scottish Premiership	19	3	1	0	4	1	—		24	4
Burton Albion	2021–22	League One	27	1	0	0	—		1	1	28	2
Burton Albion	2022–23	League One	2	0	1	0	1	0	4	0	8	0
Burton Albion	2023–24	League One	0	0	—		0	0	—		0	0
Burton Albion	Total		29	1	1	0	1	0	5	1	36	2
Doncaster Rovers (loan)	2022–23	League Two	10	0	—		—		—		10	0
AFC Wimbledon (loan)	2023–24	League Two	6	0	0	0	—		4	0	10	0
Sutton United (loan)	2023–24	League Two	21	8	—		—		—		21	8
Walsall	2024–25	League Two	36	2	2	0	3	0	8 (Note: Five appearances and one goal in EFL Trophy, three appearances and one goal in EFL League Two play-offs)	2	49	4
Walsall	2025–26	League Two	44	1	3	0	0	0	1	0	46	1
Walsall	Total		80	3	5	0	3	0	9	2	97	5
Barnet	2026–27	League Two	7	6	0	0	1	0	0	0	8	6
Career total			202	23	10	0	14	1	21	3	245	27

== Honours ==
Individual

- Sutton United Club Player of the Season: 2023–24
- Sutton United Players' Player of the Season: 2023–24
