= Nino Adom-Malaki =

English footballer (born 2004)

Personal information
- Full name: Sashiel Nino Junior Adom-Malaki
- Date of birth: 24 February 2004 (age 22)
- Height: 1.76 m (5 ft 9 in)
- Position: Left back

Team information
- Current team: Aldershot Town
- Number: 18

Youth career
- Kinetic Academy
- 2021–2023: Millwall

Senior career*
Years	Team	Apps	(Gls)
2023–2025	Millwall	0	(0)
2024	→ Sutton United (loan)	18	(1)
2025–2026	Enfield Town	43	(2)
2026–	Aldershot Town	4	(0)
- * Club domestic league appearances and goals as of 20:50, 28 August 2026 (UTC)

Sashiel Nino Junior Adom-Malaki (born 24 February 2004) is an English footballer who plays as a left back for National League club Aldershot Town.

== Career ==
=== Millwall ===
After playing for the Kinetic Academy, Adom-Malaki began his career with Millwall in 2021, signing a new contract in October 2023, before moving on loan to Sutton United in January 2024, with Millwall manager Joe Edwards saying that Adom-Malaki was ready to play first-team football.

Following his return from Sutton United, he featured for the Millwall first-team during pre-season. In a friendly with Real Murcia, Adom-Malaki suffered a serious injury after landing awkwardly on his knee, the injury requiring him to undergo surgery. He departed the club upon the expiry of his contract at the end of the 2024–25 season.

=== Non-League ===
In August 2025, Adom-Malaki joined newly promoted National League South club Enfield Town following a successful trial period.

On 5 May 2026, Adom-Malaki joined National League club Aldershot Town.

== Career statistics ==
As of match played 28 August 2026

Appearances and goals by club, season and competition
Club	Season	League			National Cup		League Cup		Other		Total	
Club	Season	Division	Apps	Goals	Apps	Goals	Apps	Goals	Apps	Goals	Apps	Goals
Millwall	2023–24	Championship	0	0	0	0	0	0	—		0	0
Millwall	2024–25	Championship	0	0	0	0	0	0	—		0	0
Sutton United (loan)	2023–24	League Two	18	1	0	0	0	0	0	0	18	1
Enfield Town	2025–26	National League South	43	2	0	0	—		0	0	43	2
Aldershot Town	2026–27	National League	4	0	—		—		1 (Note: Appearance(s) in National League Cup)	0	5	0
Career total			65	3	0	0	0	0	1	0	66	3
