= Deon Moore =

Guyanese footballer (born 1999)

Personal information
- Full name: Deon Ryan Moore
- Date of birth: 14 May 1999 (age 27)
- Place of birth: Croydon, England
- Position: Forward

Team information
- Current team: Torquay United

Youth career
- 2011–2015: Carshalton Athletic
- 2015–2016: Peterborough United

Senior career*
Years	Team	Apps	(Gls)
2016–2017	Peterborough United	4	(0)
2018	Merstham	7	(0)
2018–2020	Bristol Rovers	1	(0)
2018–2019	→ Bath City (loan)	2	(0)
2019	→ Billericay Town (loan)	3	(0)
2020	Hemel Hempstead Town	8	(0)
2020–2022	Dulwich Hamlet	21	(2)
2021	→ Lewes (loan)	5	(0)
2021	→ Carshalton Athletic (loan)	2	(0)
2022	→ Chelmsford City (loan)	7	(1)
2022–2024	Lewes	51	(12)
2024	Sutton United	12	(1)
2024	Woking	10	(0)
2025	Dulwich Hamlet	3	(0)
2025	Welling United	11	(1)
2025–2026	Maidstone United	36	(7)
2026–	Torquay United	8	(4)

International career^{‡}
2023–	Guyana	17	(5)
- * Club domestic league appearances and goals as of 18:00, 2 May 2026 (UTC) ‡ National team caps and goals as of 18:00, 2 May 2026 (UTC)

Deon Ryan Moore (born 14 May 1999) is a professional footballer who plays as a forward for National League South club Torquay United. Born in England, he plays for the Guyana national team.

== Club career ==
Born in the London Borough of Croydon, Moore started his career with the youth side at Carshalton Athletic in 2011 at under-13 age level, staying with the club four years until under-16 level. In the summer of 2015, he signed a two-year scholarship with Peterborough United. In August 2016, despite still a scholar he was promoted to the first team, making his debut as a 17-year-old in the 6–1 defeat to Norwich City U23 in the EFL Trophy, replacing Shaq Coulthirst as a substitute.

After spending time on trial at Sheffield Wednesday and Hull City, Moore joined Isthmian League side Merstham in March 2018.

=== Bristol Rovers ===
On 24 August 2018, Moore joined League One side Bristol Rovers, making his debut two months later as a late substitute in a 2–0 win over Yeovil Town in the EFL Trophy. On 16 November 2018, he joined National League South side Bath City on a one-month loan deal.

He was offered a new contract by Bristol Rovers at the end of the 2018–19 season and after a successful start to pre-season, signed an extension on 19 July 2019.

=== Hemel Hempstead Town ===
In January 2020, Moore joined National League South side Hemel Hempstead Town, making his debut on 7 January against Chippenham Town.

=== Dulwich Hamlet ===
Moore joined National League South side Dulwich Hamlet ahead of the start of the 2020–21 season, making his debut against Corinthian-Casuals in the FA Cup second qualifying on 5 October 2020, scoring an 88th-minute equaliser as Dulwich Hamlet won on penalties. In October 2021, he joined Isthmian League Premier Division side Lewes on a one-month loan deal. He made six appearances in all competitions during his loan spell. On 27 November 2021, Moore moved on loan to again to fellow Isthmian League Premier Division side Carshalton Athletic. On 19 March 2022, Moore was loaned to Chelmsford City.

=== Lewes ===
On 10 August 2022, Moore returned to Lewes on a permanent basis having previously spent time with the club on loan.

=== Sutton United ===
On 18 January 2024, Moore signed for League Two club Sutton United. The move came about after impressing new manager Steve Morison when playing against Morison's former side Hornchurch. Following the club's relegation, Moore departed the club at the end of the 2023–24 season.

=== Woking ===
On 8 August 2024, following a successful trial period, Moore joined National League side, Woking. He departed the club following the expiry of his contract on 31 December 2024.

=== Welling United ===
On 22 February 2025, Moore joined National League South side Welling United following a short spell with Dulwich Hamlet.

=== Maidstone United ===
In July 2025, Moore returned to the National League South following Welling United's relegation, joining Maidstone United.

=== Torquay United ===
On 20 March 2026, Moore joined fellow National League South club Torquay United on a short-term deal until the end of the season.

On 1 July 2026, Moore signed a two year contract with Torquay United.

== International career ==
In May 2023, Moore was selected for a training camp for Guyana, for their 2023 CONCACAF Gold Cup qualification game against Grenada. He made his international debut on 17 June 2023 in a Gold Cup Qualification match against Grenada, where Guyana won 5–3 on penalties.

His first international goal came on 14 October 2023, scoring against Puerto Rico in a CONCACAF Nations League match.

== Career statistics ==
=== Club ===
As of 2 May 2026

Appearances and goals by club, season and competition
Club	Season	League			FA Cup		League Cup		Other		Total	
Club	Season	Division	Apps	Goals	Apps	Goals	Apps	Goals	Apps	Goals	Apps	Goals
Peterborough United	2016–17	League One	4	0	0	0	0	0	2 (Note: Appearances in EFL Trophy)	0	6	0
Bristol Rovers	2018–19	League One	1	0	0	0	0	0	1	0	2	0
Bath City (loan)	2018-19	National League South	4	0	0	0	—		2 (Note: Appearance(s) in FA Trophy)	0	6	0
Lewes	2022–23	Isthmian League Premier Division	33	8	4	0	—		1	1	38	9
Lewes	2023–24	Isthmian League Premier Division	18	4	3	0	—		2	0	23	4
Lewes	Total		51	12	7	0	0	0	3	1	61	13
Sutton United	2023–24	League Two	12	1	0	0	0	0	0	0	12	1
Woking	2024–25	National League	10	0	1	0	—		1 (Note: Appearance(s) in National League Cup)	0	12	0
Dulwich Hamlet	2024–25	Isthmian League Premier Division	3	0	0	0	—		0	0	3	0
Welling United	2024–25	National League South	11	1	0	0	—		0	0	11	1
Maidstone United	2025–26	National League South	36	7	1	0	—		3 (Note: One appearance in FA Trophy, two appearances and four goals in Kent Senior Cup)	4	40	11
Torquay United	2025–26	National League South	8	4	—		—		1 (Note: Appearance in National League South play-offs)	2	9	6
Career total			140	25	9	0	0	0	13	7	162	32

=== International ===
As of match played 18 November 2025

Appearances and goals by national team and year
National team	Year	Apps	Goals
Guyana	2023	8	3
Guyana	2024	7	2
Guyana	2025	2	0
Total		17	5

As of match played 18 November 2025
Guyana score listed first, score column indicates score after each Moore goal

List of international goals scored by Deon Moore
No.	Date	Venue	Cap	Opponent	Score	Result	Competition
1	14 October 2023	SKNFA Technical Center, Basseterre, Saint Kitts and Nevis	6	Puerto Rico	3–1	3–1	2023–24 CONCACAF Nations League B
2	17 October 2023	SKNFA Technical Center, Basseterre, Saint Kitts and Nevis	7	Puerto Rico	2–1	3–1	2023–24 CONCACAF Nations League B
3	21 November 2023	Félix Sánchez Olympic Stadium, Santo Domingo, Dominican Republic	8	Antigua and Barbuda	6–0	6–0	2023–24 CONCACAF Nations League B
4	11 June 2024	Wildey Turf, Wildey, Barbados	12	Belize	1–0	3–1	2026 FIFA World Cup qualification
5	11 June 2024	Wildey Turf, Wildey, Barbados	12	Belize	3–0	3–1	2026 FIFA World Cup qualification
