= Olly Sanderson =

English footballer (born 2003)

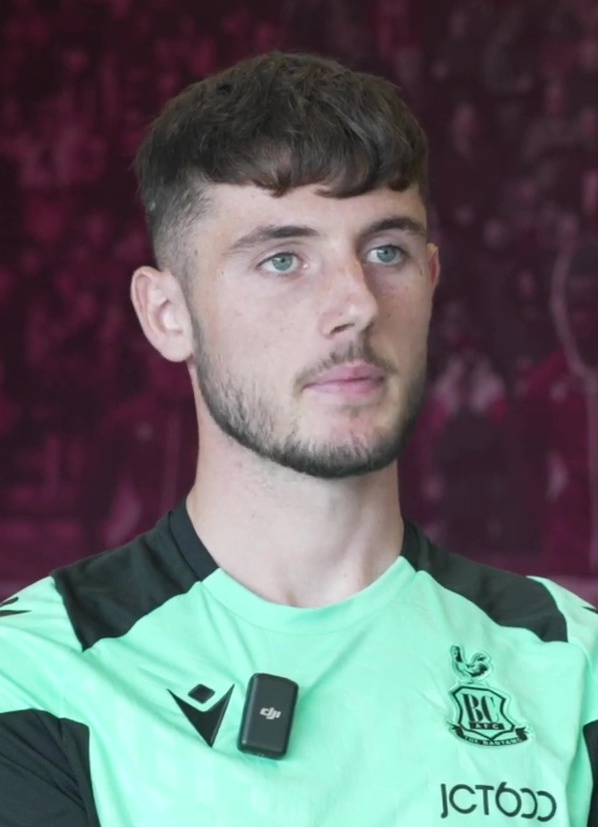

Personal information
- Full name: Oliver Sanderson
- Date of birth: 30 December 2003 (age 22)
- Place of birth: Chichester, England
- Height: 1.86 m (6 ft 1 in)
- Position: Forward

Team information
- Current team: Stevenage
- Number: 18

Youth career
- 2012–2022: Fulham

Senior career*
| Years | Team | Apps | (Gls) |
| 2022–2026 | Fulham | 0 | (0) |
| 2022–2023 | → Oxford City (loan) | 6 | (4) |
| 2023–2024 | → Oxford City (loan) | 22 | (9) |
| 2024 | → Sutton United (loan) | 20 | (4) |
| 2024–2025 | → Bradford City (loan) | 13 | (2) |
| 2025 | → Harrogate Town (loan) | 8 | (0) |
| 2025–2026 | → Woking (loan) | 40 | (17) |
| 2026– | Stevenage | 13 | (3) |
- * Club domestic league appearances and goals as of 12:27, 22 November 2026 (UTC)

Oliver Sanderson (born 30 December 2003) is an English professional footballer who plays as a forward for EFL League One club Stevenage.

Beginning his career with Fulham, Sanderson has spent time on loan at Oxford City, Sutton United, Bradford City, Harrogate Town and Woking.

== Career ==
=== Fulham ===
Born in Chichester, Sanderson joined Fulham at under-9 level. He had two loan spells at non-league Oxford City, scoring on his debut on his first spell in September 2022. He recalled by Fulham in January 2024, moving on loan to Sutton United later that month.

On 8 August 2024, he signed a new two-year deal with Fulham with the option for a further season. Four days later, he joined League Two side Bradford City on a season-long loan. He says he knew City player Kevin McDonald from his time at Fulham. After making his Bradford debut as a substitute, he said he was pushing for a starting place. After breaking into the first-team, he scored 3 goals in 4 games. However, by October 2024 he was dropped from the starting XI due to competition in the squad, with Bradford City manager Graham Alexander later denying there had been any falling out. Sanderson's loan was terminated by Bradford City in January 2025. Alexander later apologised for mis-managing Sanderson at Bradford City.

Later that month, he signed on loan for Harrogate Town.

On 8 August 2025, Sanderson joined National League club Woking on a season-long loan.

=== Stevenage ===
After the expiry of his contract with Fulham, Sanderson agreed terms with Stevenage to join the club from 1 July 2026.

== Career statistics ==
As of match played on 21 November 2026

Appearances and goals by club, season and competition
| Club | Season | League | | | FA Cup | | EFL Cup | | Other | | Total | |
| Club | Season | Division | Apps | Goals | Apps | Goals | Apps | Goals | Apps | Goals | Apps | Goals |
|---|---|---|---|---|---|---|---|---|---|---|---|---|
| Fulham | 2022–23 | Premier League | 0 | 0 | — | | 0 | 0 | 0 | 0 | 0 | 0 |
| Fulham | 2023–24 | Premier League | 0 | 0 | 0 | 0 | 0 | 0 | 0 | 0 | 0 | 0 |
| Fulham | 2024–25 | Premier League | 0 | 0 | 0 | 0 | 0 | 0 | 0 | 0 | 0 | 0 |
| Fulham | 2025–26 | Premier League | 0 | 0 | 0 | 0 | 0 | 0 | 0 | 0 | 0 | 0 |
| Fulham | Total | | 0 | 0 | 0 | 0 | 0 | 0 | 0 | 0 | 0 | 0 |
| Oxford City (loan) | 2022–23 | National League South | 6 | 4 | 2 | 1 | — | | 0 | 0 | 8 | 5 |
| Oxford City (loan) | 2023–24 | National League | 22 | 9 | 2 | 1 | — | | 1 (Note: Appearance in the FA Trophy) | 0 | 25 | 10 |
| Sutton United (loan) | 2023–24 | League Two | 20 | 4 | — | | — | | — | | 20 | 4 |
| Bradford City (loan) | 2024–25 | League Two | 13 | 2 | 2 | 0 | 0 | 0 | 3 (Note: Appearances in the EFL Trophy) | 1 | 18 | 3 |
| Harrogate Town (loan) | 2024–25 | League Two | 8 | 0 | — | | — | | — | | 8 | 0 |
| Woking (loan) | 2025–26 | National League | 40 | 17 | 2 | 0 | — | | 4 (Note: One appearance in National League Cup, three appearances in FA Trophy) | 2 | 46 | 19 |
| Stevenage | 2026–27 | League One | 13 | 3 | 1 | 0 | 2 | 0 | 2 | 1 | 18 | 4 |
| Career total | | | 128 | 39 | 9 | 2 | 2 | 0 | 10 | 4 | 149 | 45 |
