= 2017–18 Southampton F.C. season =

Southampton F.C.
2017–18 season
- Chairman: Ralph Krueger
- Manager: Mauricio Pellegrino (until 12 March 2018); Mark Hughes (from 14 March 2018)
- Stadium: St Mary's Stadium
- Premier League: 17th
- FA Cup: Semi-finals
- EFL Cup: Second round
- Top goalscorer: League: Charlie Austin (7); All: Charlie Austin (7); Dušan Tadić (7)
- Highest home attendance: 31,930 v Manchester United (23 September 2017)
- Lowest home attendance: 17,931 v Wolverhampton Wanderers (23 August 2017)
- Average home league attendance: 30,793
Home colours	Away colours	Third colours

The 2017–18 Southampton F.C. season was the club's 19th season in the Premier League and their 41st in the top division of English football. In addition to the Premier League, the club also competed in the FA Cup and the EFL Cup. Southampton finished 17th in the Premier League table with seven wins, 15 draws and 16 losses. They were knocked out of the EFL Cup in the second round by Championship side Wolverhampton Wanderers, and were knocked out of the semi-finals of the FA Cup by Chelsea. The season was Southampton's first and only campaign with manager Mauricio Pellegrino, who replaced Claude Puel after one season in charge on 23 June 2017. Pellegrino was sacked with eight league games remaining on 12 March 2018, with the club in 17th position in the table, one point above the relegation zone. Mark Hughes, who played for the club between 1998 and 2000, was appointed as his replacement two days later.

Following the end of the 2016–17 season, Southampton released Martín Cáceres, Lloyd Isgrove, Cuco Martina and Harley Willard. They also sold Jason McCarthy to Barnsley for an undisclosed fee, Jay Rodriguez to West Bromwich Albion for £12 million, and Paulo Gazzaniga to Tottenham Hotspur for an undisclosed fee. Five players were sent out on season-long loans – Harrison Reed to Norwich City, Harry Lewis to Dundee United, Ryan Seager to Milton Keynes Dons, Sam Gallagher to Birmingham City, and Jordy Clasie to Club Brugge – while Olufela Olomola joined Yeovil Town on loan until January.

Southampton's first signing of the summer transfer window was Polish centre-back Jan Bednarek, who joined from Lech Poznań for £5 million on 1 July. The club's second signing followed on 8 August, when Gabonese defensive midfielder Mario Lemina joined from Italian club Juventus for an initial fee of £15.4 million, which could increase to a club record £18.1 million based on performance. On 14 August, Southampton signed free agent goalkeeper Jack Rose, who had most recently played for West Bromwich Albion. The following week, the club signed Dutch centre-back Wesley Hoedt from Italian side Lazio for £15 million.

When the transfer window reopened in January 2018, Dutch centre-back Virgil van Dijk joined Liverpool for £75 million, a world record fee for a defender. Young striker Marcus Barnes joined Yeovil Town on loan for the rest of the season on 5 January, while left-back Matt Target joined Championship side Fulham on loan for the rest of the season on 22 January. On 25 January, the club signed Argentine striker Guido Carrillo from French side AS Monaco for a club record fee of £19 million. Seager was recalled from his loan at Milton Keynes Dons on 26 January, and instead joined Yeovil Town until the end of the season.

== Pre-season ==
Southampton played their first pre-season friendly against Swiss club St. Gallen on 15 July 2017. The game ended in a goalless draw, with Saints coming close to scoring in the first half through Dušan Tadić and Nathan Tella, and in the second half through Steven Davis and Manolo Gabbiadini. A week later, the club drew 2–2 with Championship side Brentford, with both goals scored by striker Charlie Austin shortly after the half-time break. On 29 July the Saints beat French side Saint-Étienne 3–0, with two goals in two minutes scored by Manolo Gabbiadini and James Ward-Prowse, followed by a late header from Maya Yoshida. Southampton lost their first friendly of the season at St Mary's Stadium on 2 August, when they were beaten 4–0 by German side Augsburg. Three days later the club won their final pre-season friendly of the summer against Spanish side Sevilla, with goals coming from Jack Stephens in the first half and Manolo Gabbiadini in the second.

15 July 2017 Friendly	St. Gallen	0–0	Southampton	Goldach, Switzerland
15:30 BST		Report		Stadium: Sportanlage Kellen

22 July 2017 Friendly	Brentford	2–2	Southampton	London
15:00 BST	Vibe 40'; Clarke 82'	Report	Austin 52', 60'	Stadium: Griffin Park

29 July 2017 Friendly	Saint-Étienne	0–3	Southampton	Chambéry, France
17:00 BST		Report	Gabbiadini 64'; Ward-Prowse 66'; Yoshida 86'	Stadium: Stade Municipal de Chambéry

2 August 2017 Friendly	Southampton	0–4	Augsburg	Southampton
19:45 BST		Report	Gregoritsch 35', 39'; Koo Ja-cheol 67'; Framberger 82'	Stadium: St Mary's Stadium

5 August 2017 Friendly	Southampton	2–0	Sevilla	Southampton
15:00 BST	Stephens 26'; Gabbiadini 82'	Report		Stadium: St Mary's Stadium

== Premier League ==
=== August–October 2017 ===
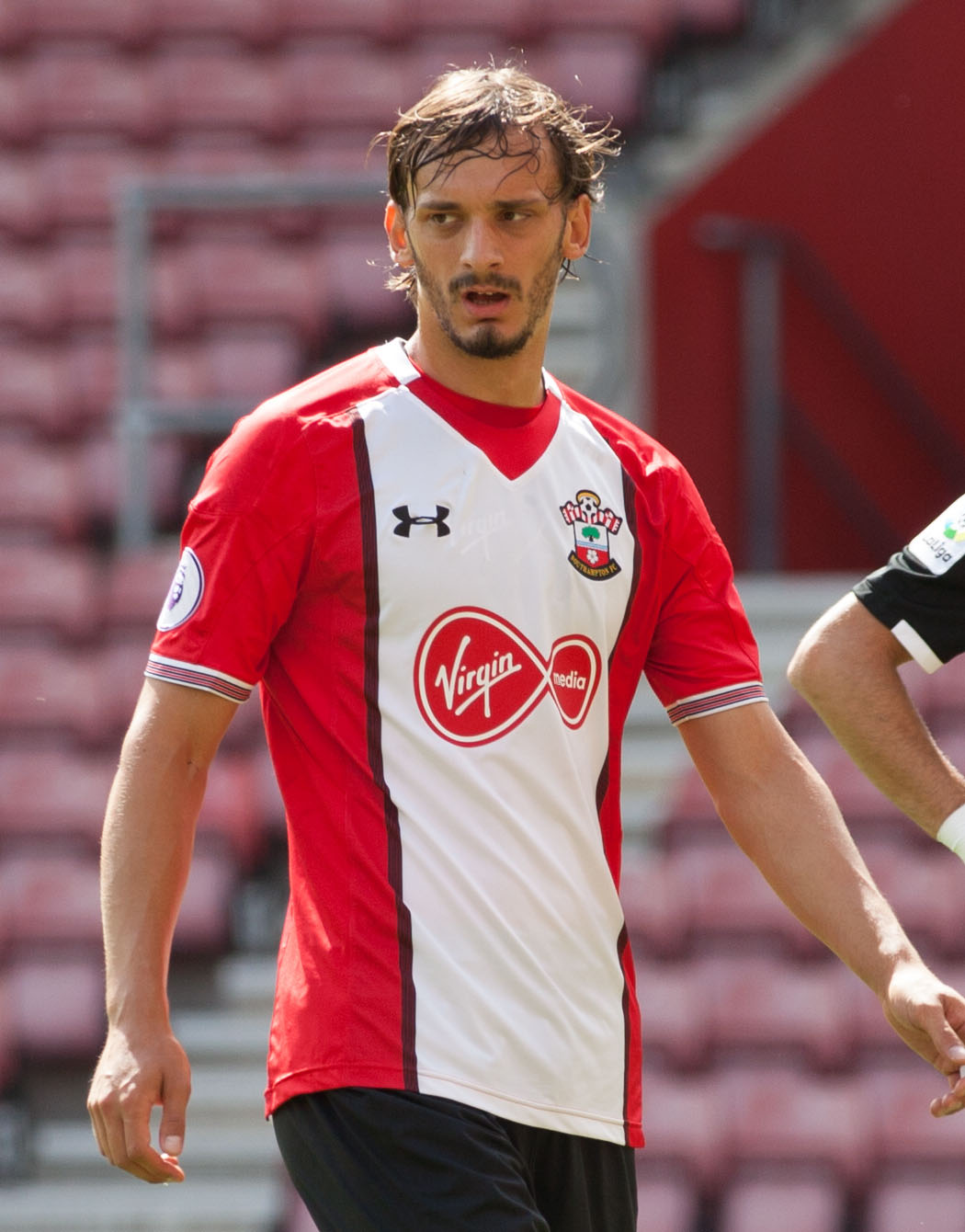
Manolo Gabbiadini scored the club's first goal of the season in their second match, against West Ham United.

In their opening game of the season, Southampton were held to a goalless draw at home by Swansea City. The Saints enjoyed the majority of chances on goal, with Dušan Tadić, Manolo Gabbiadini and Maya Yoshida coming closest to scoring. The following week, Southampton beat West Ham United 3–2 to move up to fifth in the league table. Gabbiadini converted in the 11th minute with the club's first home goal since April, before Marko Arnautović was sent off for the visitors 12 minutes before half-time. Tadić doubled the hosts' lead with a penalty given away by former Saints defender José Fonte five minutes after the red card, before Javier Hernández brought one back for the Hammers on the stroke of half-time. Hernández equalised for West Ham in the second half, but a second penalty for the home side was scored by substitute Charlie Austin in the final minute of the game. The side's next match, away at Huddersfield Town, ended goalless. Nathan Redmond came close for the Saints in both halves, although the hosts enjoyed more chances on goal. Ryan Bertrand almost scored in injury time at the end of the game, but his header was cleared off the line by defender Tommy Smith.

After a two-week international break, Southampton suffered their first loss of the season when Watford beat them 2–0 at St Mary's. Abdoulaye Doucouré opened the scoring for the visitors shortly before half-time with a 25-yard volley, before substitute Daryl Janmaat doubled his side's lead in the 66th minute with a 30-yard shot. The Saints had only one shot on target the whole match, in injury time at the end of the game. The following week, Southampton beat Crystal Palace 1–0 at Selhurst Park. Steven Davis opened the scoring within six minutes, converting a Dušan Tadić cross from close range. The home side came close either side of half-time, with Fraser Forster saving shots from Christian Benteke and Jason Puncheon. On 23 September, Southampton hosted Manchester United and lost by a single goal. Romelu Lukaku opened the scoring after 20 minutes, following up after his header from a cross was saved. The hosts almost equalised several times later on, with Oriol Romeu coming closest on two occasions, one of which was headed off the line by Marouane Fellaini. Southampton lost again the following week at Stoke City. The hosts opened the scoring before half-time through a Mame Biram Diouf header, with Forster saving a Saido Berahino penalty a few minutes later. The Saints increased the pressure after the break, with Maya Yoshida scoring a volley in the 75th minute to equalise. Former Southampton striker Peter Crouch scored ten minutes later to secure the win.

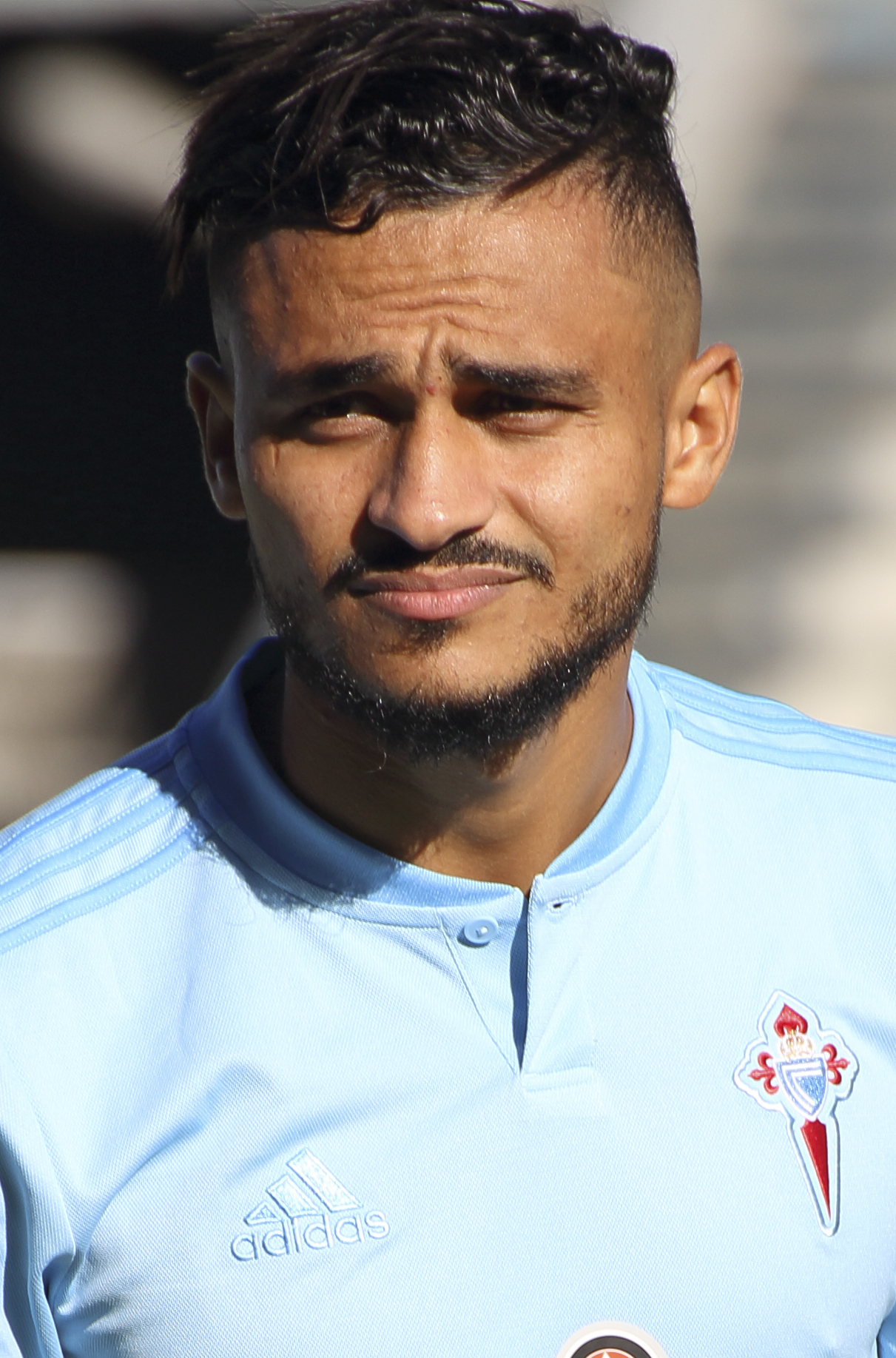
Sofiane Boufal scored his first goal of the season in a 1–0 win over West Bromwich Albion in October.

Southampton drew 2–2 at home with Newcastle United on 15 October. Isaac Hayden opened the scoring in the 20th minute with a long-range shot following an earlier effort that was saved, and Joselu almost made it two before half-time when he hit the crossbar. Shortly after the break, Manolo Gabbiadini equalised for the hosts from close range, but within a minute and a half the visitors had regained the lead through Ayoze Pérez. The Saints were awarded a penalty later on for a foul on Shane Long, which Gabbiadini converted to secure a point for his side. The next week, the club beat West Bromwich Albion by a single late goal. The Saints enjoyed a number of chances to open the scoring, with Ryan Bertrand hitting the crossbar from a free kick and Shane Long missing from close range in the first half. Former Southampton striker Jay Rodriguez almost scored for the Baggies later on, but a solo effort from Sofiane Boufal in the 85th minute proved the only break of the game. Visiting Brighton & Hove Albion in their tenth game of the season, Southampton drew 1–1 and moved up to ninth in the table. Steven Davis opened the scoring after seven minutes with his second goal of the campaign, converting a rebound from James Ward-Prowse's free-kick. Glenn Murray equalised for the hosts after the break, with the deadlock held for the rest of the game.

=== November–December 2017 ===
Southampton hosted Burnley on 4 November, losing 1–0 and dropping to 13th in the Premier League table. The hosts came close to scoring in the first half and early in the second through Sofiane Boufal, Nathan Redmond and Maya Yoshida, all of whom were denied by saves by goalkeeper Nick Pope. Sam Vokes scored the only goal of the match in the last ten minutes, heading in a cross. Two weeks later, the Saints lost again as Liverpool picked up a 3–0 win at Anfield. Mohamed Salah scored the first two goals for the hosts late in the first half, the first following a defensive error by the visitors and the second after a setup from Philippe Coutinho. The Brazilian midfielder scored the third goal himself in the second half. The club picked up their first win by more than a single goal of the season the following week, beating Everton 4–1 at home. The Saints dominated possession throughout the game, with Dušan Tadić opened the scoring in the 18th minute. Gylfi Sigurðsson equalised just before half-time, but a brace from Charlie Austin shortly after the break put the hosts back ahead. Steven Davis scored the fourth goal late on, as Southampton moved up to the top half of the league table. The team faced league leaders Manchester City in midweek, losing 2–1 late on. Maya Yoshida missed a close range volley in the visitors' best first-half chance, before Kevin De Bruyne opened the scoring for the hosts shortly after half time. Oriol Romeu equalised with his first goal of the season in the 75th minute, but Raheem Sterling won the game for City in the final minute of injury time at the end of the match.

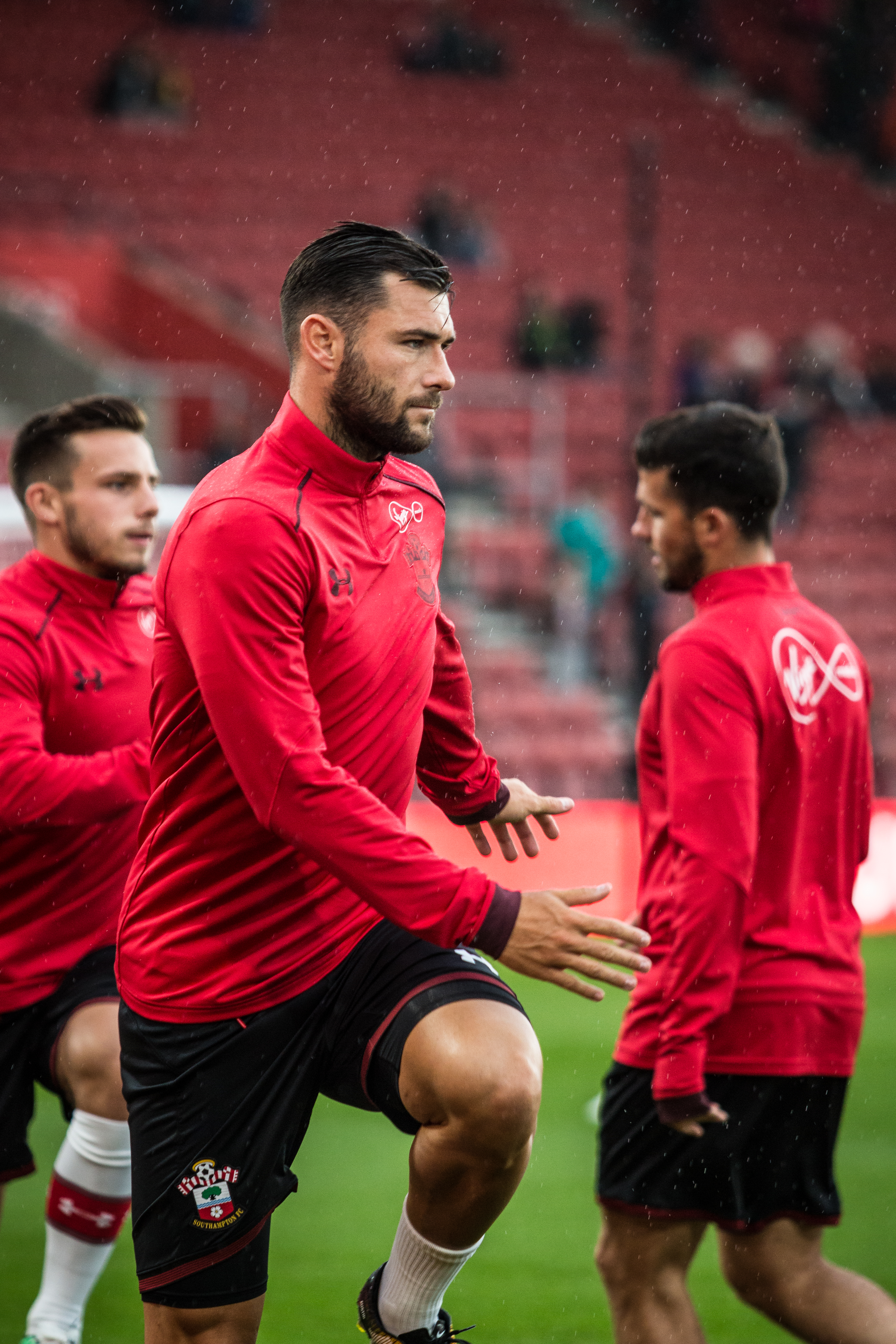
Charlie Austin scored five goals during November and December to take over as the club's top scorer for the season.

On 3 December, Southampton travelled to nearby rivals Bournemouth, sharing the points in a 1–1 draw. Both teams had a number of chances on goal, but it was the hosts who opened the scoring through winger Ryan Fraser just before half-time, following a defensive error by Wesley Hoedt. Shortly after the hour mark, Charlie Austin scored his fourth goal of the season to bring the visitors level. Numerous chances for each side followed, but it ended level as the Saints moved back up to 11th in the table. The following week, the club hosted Arsenal in another 1–1 draw. Austin opened the scoring in the third minute, and came close to scoring more early on but for a number of offside decisions. The visitors dominated possession, but struggled to pressure Southampton's goal until two minutes from the end of the game, when Olivier Giroud headed in an equaliser for the Gunners. Southampton hosted Leicester City three days later in a midweek fixture, succumbing to a 4–1 loss to former manager Claude Puel's side. The Foxes opened the scoring after eleven minutes through Riyad Mahrez, with Shinji Okazaki doubling the lead just over 20 minutes later. Andy King added a third before half-time, Yoshida scored a consolation goal for the hosts just after the hour mark, and Leicester added a fourth through Okazaki's second.

The club lost again in their next match at league champions Chelsea. Marcos Alonso scored the only goal on the stroke of half-time, with the hosts continuing to dominate for the rest of the match. The following week, Southampton drew 1–1 at home with promoted side Huddersfield Town. Charlie Austin opened the scoring in the 24th minute as the result of a corner, with Laurent Depoitre equalising for the visitors in the second half. Maya Yoshida came close to winning the game for the home side in stoppage time at the end of the match, but his header hit the post. After the game, Austin was charged with violent conduct and banned for three matches, after kicking goalkeeper Jonas Lössl in the face. The club lost 5–2 at Tottenham Hotspur the following week, dropping a place in the table. Harry Kane scored two in the first half from close range, with his first breaking the record for most Premier League goals in a calendar year, previously held by Alan Shearer. Delle Alli scored a third for Spurs just after the break, with Son Heung-min adding a fourth two minutes later. Sofiane Boufal brought one back for the visitors after the hour mark, but Kane completed his hat-trick minutes later. Dušan Tadić scored a second for the Saints late on. In their last game of 2017, the Saints held Manchester United to a goalless draw at Old Trafford.

=== January–March 2018 ===
In their first game of 2018, Southampton lost 2–1 to Crystal Palace. Shane Long scored his first goal since February 2017 to put the hosts up in the first half, but second-half goals from James McArthur and Luka Milivojević gave Palace the win. The club's next game, at Watford, ended in a 2–2 draw. The Saints were 2–0 up by half-time, with James Ward-Prowse scoring his first two league goals of the season before the break. Andre Gray brought a goal back for the hosts in the second half, before Watford secured a point in controversial circumstances when Abdoulaye Doucouré scored in the final minute of normal time after using his hand. The following week, Southampton hosted Tottenham Hotspur and drew 1–1. After a lot of pressure in the opening exchanges, the Saints went 1–0 up in the 15th minute when defender Davinson Sánchez turned a cross from Ryan Bertrand into his own goal. Three minutes later, however, Spurs were equal through a Harry Kane header from a corner. Jack Stephens almost scored a second for the hosts before half-time, and both chances enjoyed numerous chances to score a winner after the break, but it ended level and Southampton remained in the relegation zone. The club drew 1–1 again in their following game, at home to Brighton & Hove Albion. Glenn Murray opened the scoring with a 14th-minute penalty, after a foul by Wesley Hoedt, with Jack Stephens equalising in the second half from a James Ward-Prowse corner.

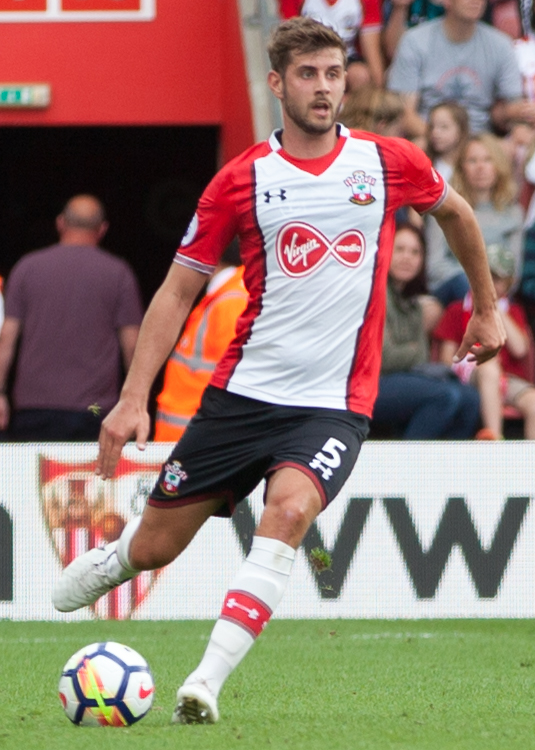
Jack Stephens scored his first two goals for the club to help temporarily lift them out of the relegation zone.

Southampton picked up their first win in 13 games on 3 February 2018, beating bottom side West Bromwich Albion 3–2. The Baggies opened the scoring within five minutes when Ahmed Hegazi headed in a corner from Chris Brunt, but the Saints increased the pressure and dominated much of the rest of the first half. Shortly before the break, Mario Lemina scored his first goal for the club from outside the penalty area and Jack Stephens scored his third goal in as many games to put the visitors ahead. Ten minutes into the second half, James Ward-Prowse added a third from a free-kick, before Salomón Rondón pulled back a second for the hosts later on. The following week, the Saints hosted Liverpool and lost 2–0. Roberto Firmino opened the scoring in the sixth minute, after being set up by Mohamed Salah. The hosts came close to equalising on a number of occasions, but it was the visitors who struck again just before half-time, as Salah scored a goal of his own. On 24 February, Southampton drew 1–1 with Burnley at Turf Moor. Neither side mounted many challenges on goal in the first half, with the hosts opening the scoring 20 minutes into the second half courtesy of Ashley Barnes. The Saints almost scored through substitute Josh Sims but for a save by Nick Pope, before Manolo Gabbiadini scored his first goal since October in the final minute of the game to save a point for the visitors and keep them out of the relegation zone.

On 3 March, Southampton were held to a goalless draw by Stoke City at home, dropping to 17th in the table as a result. The visitors came close to scoring at the end of the first half through Badou Ndiaye, with goalkeeper Alex McCarthy making a save from his header. The hosts had a number of chances in the second half through Josh Sims, Cédric Soares and substitute Sofiane Boufal, but were unable to convert and were held at 0–0. The following week, on 10 March, Southampton lost 3–0 to Newcastle United at St James' Park. Brazilian loanee Kenedy opened the scoring for the hosts within the minute of play, and scored a second in the 29th minute to double Newcastle's advantage. The visitors offered little goal threat, with only two shots on target from the Saints in the second half. Matt Ritchie scored a third for the home side after 57 minutes, wrapping up the three points in convincing style and condemning Southampton to yet another defeat. It would spell the end of Mauricio Pellegrino's tenure as Southampton manager, as he was sacked on 12 March with the club one point above the relegation zone and having won just once in 17 matches. On 14 March, former Southampton player Mark Hughes was appointed as first team manager until the end of the campaign.

After a break for international fixtures, Hughes took charge of his first Southampton league match on 31 March, which saw the Saints lose 3–0 at West Ham United. João Mário opened the scoring for the home side after just 13 minutes, with Marko Arnautović doubling the Hammers' lead a few minutes later. Southampton offered little in terms of goalscoring opportunities, and before half-time Arnautović scored his second and West Ham's third to secure the win, which saw the visitors drop back into the relegation zone.

=== April–May 2018 ===
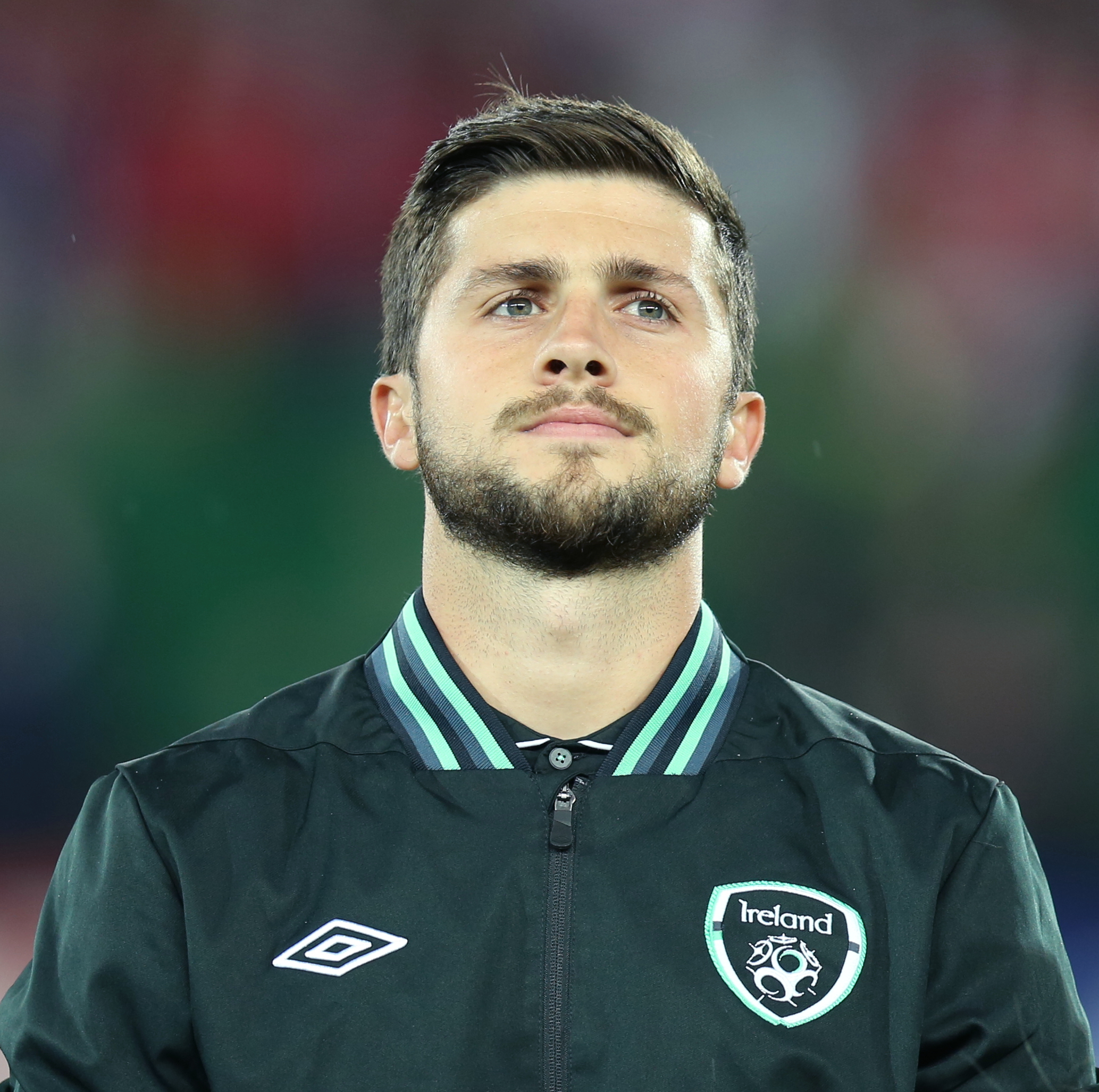
Shane Long scored his first goal since January against Arsenal on 8 April.

The side remained in the relegation zone the following week, after a 3–2 defeat away to Arsenal. After a promising start to the game, Southampton opened the scoring when Shane Long beat Shkodran Mustafi at the near post. However, ten minutes later Pierre-Emerick Aubameyang equalised before Danny Welbeck put the Gunners ahead before half-time. Charlie Austin equalised for Southampton in the 73rd minute just after coming on as a substitute, but Welbeck scored a second to put Arsenal ahead once again. In injury time at the end of the game, Jack Stephens was sent off following an altercation with Jack Wilshere, before Mohamed Elneny was also dismissed. The next week, Southampton were on the receiving end of another 3–2 loss against Chelsea. The home side opened the scoring after 21 minutes, when Dušan Tadić tapped in his fourth goal of the season from a Ryan Bertrand cross. After continuing to enjoy the majority of chances on goal, the Saints doubled their lead shortly after half-time when Premier League debutant Jan Bednarek scored from James Ward-Prowse's free-kick. However, Chelsea took the lead during an eight-minute period in which they scored three times – first, substitute Olivier Giroud headed in from Marcos Alonso's cross, then Eden Hazard scored, followed by a second for Giroud.

The following week, Southampton were held to a goalless draw at Leicester City. The game included very few chances on goal, with Shane Long and Jamie Vardy coming closest to breaking the deadlock for either side in the second half. On 28 April, Southampton picked up their first home win since November when they beat local rivals Bournemouth 2–1 at St Mary's. The Cherries started the stronger of the sides, but the Saints opened the scoring after 25 minutes when Dušan Tadić scored after a counter-attack which was set up from a Bournemouth corner. Despite enjoying the majority of pressure throughout the rest of the half, the hosts conceded on the stroke of half-time when Joshua King scored a volley from a corner. The visitors started the second half with the stronger approach, but it was the hosts who scored next ten minutes after the break as Tadić doubled his tally to put his side ahead. Charlie Austin and Shane Long came close to scoring a third, before Bournemouth increased the pressure towards the end and almost equalised through Ryan Fraser in stoppage time, but for a save by Alex McCarthy.

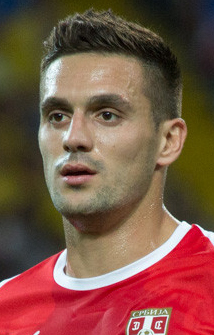
Dušan Tadić scored both goals in the 2–1 win over A.F.C. Bournemouth to increase his league tally to six.

Southampton drew their next match against Everton to move out of the relegation zone for the first time in five matches. After a first half with very few chances for either side, substitute Nathan Redmond opened the scoring for the Saints when he converted from a Cédric Soares setup. Maya Yoshida was sent off five minutes before the end of the game. The hosts equalised in the last minute of added time at the end of the match, shortly after goalkeeper Alex McCarthy denied Leighton Baines, when a shot from Tom Davies deflected off Wesley Hoedt. In their penultimate game of the season, Southampton edged out Swansea City to all but secure their place in the next season's Premier League. The visiting Saints opened the scoring in the second half again, with substitute Manolo Gabbiadini scoring his first goal since February from a corner. Charlie Austin had several chances on goal throughout both halves but failed to convert any, although Southampton still held on for the win to move up to 16th in the league table ahead of Huddersfield Town on goal difference.

In their final game of the season, Southampton hosted new Premier League champions Manchester City on 13 May. The Saints went into the game almost guaranteed of safety, with Swansea City needing to beat Stoke City by a large margin in order to survive, although a point for the South Coast club would secure at least 17th position. The hosts arguably enjoyed more chances on goal than the champions, with centre-backs Jack Stephens and Wesley Hoedt both almost scoring early in the first half – the former after a long run through the middle of the pitch, and the latter with a header which hit the crossbar. After the half-time break, City increased the pressure as Raheem Sterling beat Alex McCarthy with a shot that hit the post, and John Stones came close with a header that the Saints goalkeeper tipped over the crossbar. Dušan Tadić saw a shot cleared off the line later in the game, but it was the visitors who scored the only goal with one of the final touches of the game, when Gabriel Jesus chipped McCarthy in the fourth minute of added time, helping the club set new Premier League season records of 100 points, 16 away wins and 106 goals.

=== League table ===
Pos	Team	Pld	W	D	L	GF	GA	GD	Pts	Qualification or relegation
15	Brighton & Hove Albion	38	9	13	16	34	54	−20	40	
16	Huddersfield Town	38	9	10	19	28	58	−30	37	
17	Southampton	38	7	15	16	37	56	−19	36	
18	Swansea City (R)	38	8	9	21	28	56	−28	33	Relegation to EFL Championship
19	Stoke City (R)	38	7	12	19	35	68	−33	33	Relegation to EFL Championship

Source: Premier League
Rules for classification: 1) Points; 2) Goal difference; 3) Goals scored. 4) Play-offs (only if needed to decide champion, teams for relegation or teams for UEFA competitions).
(R) Relegated

=== Results by matchday ===
Matchday	1	2	3	4	5	6	7	8	9	10	11	12	13	14	15	16	17	18	19	20	21	22	23	24	25	26	27	28	29	30	31	32	33	34	35	36	37	38
Ground	H	H	A	H	A	H	A	H	H	A	H	A	H	A	A	H	H	A	H	A	A	H	A	H	H	A	H	A	H	A	A	A	H	A	H	A	A	H
Result	D	W	D	L	W	L	L	D	W	D	L	L	W	L	D	D	L	L	D	L	D	L	D	D	D	W	L	D	D	L	L	L	L	D	W	D	W	L
Position	9	5	6	10	9	11	12	10	10	9	13	14	10	11	11	11	11	12	13	14	13	17	17	18	18	14	18	16	17	17	18	18	18	18	18	17	17	17

Updated to match(es) played on 13 May 2018. Source: BBC Sport
A = Away; H = Home; W = Win; D = Draw; L = Loss

=== Match reports ===
12 August 2017 1	Southampton	0–0	Swansea City	Southampton
15:00 BST		Report		Stadium: St Mary's Stadium; Attendance: 31,447; Referee: Mike Jones

19 August 2017 2	Southampton	3–2	West Ham United	Southampton
15:00 BST	Gabbiadini 11'; Tadić 38' (pen.); Austin 90+1' (pen.)	Report	Hernández 45', 74'	Stadium: St Mary's Stadium; Attendance: 31,424; Referee: Lee Mason

26 August 2017 3	Huddersfield Town	0–0	Southampton	Huddersfield
15:00 BST		Report		Stadium: Kirklees Stadium; Attendance: 23,548; Referee: Stuart Attwell

9 September 2017 4	Southampton	0–2	Watford	Southampton
15:00 BST		Report	Doucouré 38'; Janmaat 66'	Stadium: St Mary's Stadium; Attendance: 31,435; Referee: Lee Probert

16 September 2017 5	Crystal Palace	0–1	Southampton	London
12:30 BST		Report	Davis 6'	Stadium: Selhurst Park; Attendance: 24,199; Referee: Bobby Madley

23 September 2017 6	Southampton	0–1	Manchester United	Southampton
15:00 BST		Report	Lukaku 20'	Stadium: St Mary's Stadium; Attendance: 31,930; Referee: Craig Pawson

30 September 2017 7	Stoke City	2–1	Southampton	Stoke-on-Trent
15:00 BST	Diouf 40'; Crouch 85'		Yoshida 75'	Stadium: bet365 Stadium; Attendance: 29,285; Referee: Mike Jones

15 October 2017 8	Southampton	2–2	Newcastle United	Southampton
16:00 BST	Gabbiadini 49', 75' (pen.)	Report	Hayden 20'; Pérez 51'	Stadium: St Mary's Stadium; Attendance: 31,437; Referee: Kevin Friend

21 October 2017 9	Southampton	1–0	West Bromwich Albion	Southampton
17:30 BST	Boufal 85'	Report		Stadium: St Mary's Stadium; Attendance: 29,947; Referee: Graham Scott

29 October 2017 10	Brighton & Hove Albion	1–1	Southampton	Brighton and Hove
13:30 BST	Murray 52'	Report	Davis 7'	Stadium: Falmer Stadium; Attendance: 30,564; Referee: Neil Swarbrick

4 November 2017 11	Southampton	0–1	Burnley	Southampton
15:00 GMT		Report	Vokes 81'	Stadium: St Mary's Stadium; Attendance: 30,491; Referee: Lee Probert

18 November 2017 12	Liverpool	3–0	Southampton	Liverpool
15:00 GMT	Salah 31', 41'; Coutinho 68'	Report		Stadium: Anfield; Attendance: 53,256; Referee: Mike Jones

26 November 2017 13	Southampton	4–1	Everton	Southampton
13:30 GMT	Tadić 18'; Austin 52', 58'; Davis 87'	Report	Sigurðsson 45'	Stadium: St Mary's Stadium; Attendance: 30,461; Referee: Kevin Friend

29 November 2017 14	Manchester City	2–1	Southampton	Manchester
20:00 GMT	De Bruyne 47'; Sterling 90+6'	Report	Romeu 75'	Stadium: City of Manchester Stadium; Attendance: 53,407; Referee: Paul Tierney

3 December 2017 15	Bournemouth	1–1	Southampton	Bournemouth
13:30 GMT	Fraser 42'	Report	Austin 61'	Stadium: Dean Court; Attendance: 10,764; Referee: Jonathan Moss

10 December 2017 16	Southampton	1–1	Arsenal	Southampton
12:00 GMT	Austin 3'	Report	Giroud 88'	Stadium: St Mary's Stadium; Attendance: 31,643; Referee: Bobby Madley

13 December 2017 17	Southampton	1–4	Leicester City	Southampton
19:45 GMT	Yoshida 61'	Report	Mahrez 11'; Okazaki 31', 69'; King 38'	Stadium: St Mary's Stadium; Attendance: 27,714; Referee: Chris Kavanagh

16 December 2017 18	Chelsea	1–0	Southampton	London
15:00 GMT	Alonso 45+3'	Report		Stadium: Stamford Bridge; Attendance: 41,562; Referee: Roger East

23 December 2017 19	Southampton	1–1	Huddersfield Town	Southampton
15:00 GMT	Austin 24'	Report	Depoitre 64'	Stadium: St Mary's Stadium; Attendance: 29,675; Referee: Lee Probert

26 December 2017 20	Tottenham Hotspur	5–2	Southampton	London
12:30 GMT	Kane 22', 39', 67'; Alli 49'; Son 51'	Report	Boufal 64'; Tadić 82'	Stadium: Wembley Stadium; Attendance: 55,412; Referee: Graham Scott

30 December 2017 21	Manchester United	0–0	Southampton	Manchester
17:30 GMT		Report		Stadium: Old Trafford; Attendance: 75,051; Referee: Craig Pawson

2 January 2018 22	Southampton	1–2	Crystal Palace	Southampton
19:45 GMT	Long 17'	Report	McArthur 69'; Milivojević 80'	Stadium: St Mary's Stadium; Attendance: 28,411; Referee: Stuart Attwell

13 January 2018 23	Watford	2–2	Southampton	Watford
15:00 GMT	Gray 58'; Doucouré 90'	Report	Ward-Prowse 20', 44'	Stadium: Vicarage Road; Attendance: 20,018; Referee: Roger East

21 January 2018 24	Southampton	1–1	Tottenham Hotspur	Southampton
16:00 GMT	Sánchez 15' (o.g.)	Report	Kane 18'	Stadium: St Mary's Stadium; Attendance: 31,361; Referee: Kevin Friend

31 January 2018 25	Southampton	1–1	Brighton & Hove Albion	Southampton
19:45 GMT	Stephens 64'	Report	Murray 14' (pen.)	Stadium: St Mary's Stadium; Attendance: 30,034; Referee: Mike Dean

3 February 2018 26	West Bromwich Albion	2–3	Southampton	West Bromwich
15:00 GMT	Hegazi 4'; Rondón 72'	Report	Lemina 40'; Stephens 43'; Ward-Prowse 55'	Stadium: The Hawthorns; Attendance: 25,911; Referee: Michael Olver

11 February 2018 27	Southampton	0–2	Liverpool	Southampton
16:30 GMT		Report	Firmino 6'; Salah 42'	Stadium: St Mary's Stadium; Attendance: 31,915; Referee: Martin Atkinson

24 February 2018 28	Burnley	1–1	Southampton	Burnley
15:00 GMT	Barnes 67'	Report	Gabbiadini 90'	Stadium: Turf Moor; Referee: Bobby Madley

3 March 2018 29	Southampton	0–0	Stoke City	Southampton
15:00 GMT		Report		Stadium: St Mary's Stadium; Attendance: 30,335; Referee: Anthony Taylor

10 March 2018 30	Newcastle United	3–0	Southampton	Newcastle upon Tyne
15:00 GMT	Kenedy 2', 29'; Ritchie 57'	Report		Stadium: St. James' Park; Attendance: 52,246; Referee: Andre Marriner

31 March 2018 31	West Ham United	3–0	Southampton	London
15:00 BST	João Mário 13'; Arnautović 17', 45+4'	Report		Stadium: Olympic Stadium; Attendance: 56,882; Referee: Jonathan Moss

8 April 2018 32	Arsenal	3–2	Southampton	London
14:15 BST	Aubameyang 28'; Welbeck 38', 81'	Report	Long 17'; Austin 73'	Stadium: Emirates Stadium; Attendance: 59,374; Referee: Andre Marriner

14 April 2018 33	Southampton	2–3	Chelsea	Southampton
12:30 BST	Tadić 21'; Bednarek 60'	Report	Giroud 70', 78'; Hazard 75'	Stadium: St Mary's Stadium; Attendance: 31,764; Referee: Mike Dean

19 April 2018 34	Leicester City	0–0	Southampton	Leicester
19:45 BST		Report		Stadium: King Power Stadium; Attendance: 31,160; Referee: Roger East

28 April 2018 35	Southampton	2–1	Bournemouth	Southampton
15:00 BST	Tadić 25', 54'	Report	King 45+1'	Stadium: St Mary's Stadium; Attendance: 31,778; Referee: Anthony Taylor

5 May 2018 36	Everton	1–1	Southampton	Liverpool
17:30 BST	Davies 90+6'	Report	Redmond 56'	Stadium: Goodison Park; Attendance: 38,225; Referee: Jonathan Moss

8 May 2018 37	Swansea City	0–1	Southampton	Swansea
19:45 BST		Report	Gabbiadini 72'	Stadium: Liberty Stadium; Attendance: 20,858; Referee: Michael Oliver

13 May 2018 38	Southampton	0–1	Manchester City	Southampton
15:00 BST			Gabriel Jesus 90+5'	Stadium: St Mary's Stadium; Attendance: 31,882; Referee: Andre Marriner

== FA Cup ==
Southampton entered the 2017–18 FA Cup in the third round, beating Championship side Fulham by a single goal. James Ward-Prowse set up a number of goalscoring opportunities early in the game, before himself opening the scoring in the 29th minute. The visitors could have doubled their lead on many occasions in the second half, with Pierre-Emile Højbjerg coming close to scoring shortly after the break. The hosts threatened the Southampton goal a number of times, but the Saints came closest to scoring the next goal as Jack Stephens hit the crossbar with a close-range header later on.

The club hosted fellow Premier League side Watford in the fourth round of the tournament on 27 January, again winning 1–0 to advance to the fifth round for the first time since the 2013–14 season. The home side opened the scoring early on, when centre-back Jack Stephens scored his first goal for the club in the fourth minute, converting after Shane Long's shot was saved. The Saints had many more chances to score in the first half, but were unable to double their lead. Watford almost equalised late on, but Southampton held on for the win. Guido Carrillo made his debut for the club as a late substitute.

In the fifth round, Southampton beat West Bromwich Albion 2–1 to advance to the quarter-finals for the first time since the 2004–05 season. Centre-back Wesley Hoedt opened the scoring in the eleventh minute with his first goal for the club, converting from James Ward-Prowse's corner. The Saints dominated the rest of the first half, and eventually scored a second ten minutes after the break through Dušan Tadić, who chipped goalkeeper Ben Foster after a counter-attack from his side's own half. Salomón Rondón scored for the hosts a minute later, but the visitors held on until the end to reach the quarter-finals.

On 18 March, Southampton beat League One side Wigan Athletic 2–0 to advance to the semi-finals for the first time since the 2002–03 season. The first half was largely dominated by the lower league hosts, who had three clear chances to score but failed to convert any. The Saints came out strong after half-time, with Manolo Gabbiadini missing a one-on-one with goalkeeper Christian Walton early on. Pierre-Emile Højbjerg later opened the scoring after 62 minutes with his first goal for the club, converting from a corner. Gabbiadini had another chance to score for his side from the penalty spot ten minutes later, but saw his effort saved by Walton again. Cédric Soares finally doubled Southampton's lead in injury time to send them through to the penultimate round of the tournament.

Southampton faced Chelsea in the semi-final of the FA Cup at Wembley Stadium on 22 April 2018. The Saints held off pressure from Chelsea in the first half to go into the break goalless, with Willian hitting the crossbar in the best chance of the first period. However, Olivier Giroud opened the scoring less than a minute after the restart, beating several defenders and goalkeeper Alex McCarthy after being put through in the box by Eden Hazard. Shane Long missed a one-on-one chance with Chelsea goalkeeper Willy Caballero, while Charlie Austin saw several chances on goal save or go wide of the posts. Chelsea doubled their lead late on after bringing on Alvaro Morata, who headed in a cross from César Azpilicueta to secure a place in the final and send Southampton out of the tournament.

6 January 2018 Round 3	Fulham	0–1	Southampton	London
15:00 GMT		Report	Ward-Prowse 29'	Stadium: Craven Cottage; Attendance: 17,327; Referee: Michael Oliver

27 January 2018 Round 4	Southampton	1–0	Watford	Southampton
15:00	Stephens 4'	Report		Stadium: St Mary's Stadium; Attendance: 25,195; Referee: Bobby Madley

17 February 2018 Round 5	West Bromwich Albion	1–2	Southampton	West Bromwich
15:00 GMT	Rondón 58'	Report	Hoedt 11'; Tadić 56'	Stadium: The Hawthorns; Attendance: 17,600; Referee: Chris Kavanagh

18 March 2018 Quarter-Final	Wigan Athletic	0–2	Southampton	Wigan
13:30 GMT		Report	Højbjerg 62'; Soares 90+1'	Stadium: DW Stadium; Attendance: 17,110; Referee: Michael Oliver

22 April 2018 Semi-Final	Chelsea	2–0	Southampton	London
15:00 BST	Giroud 46'; Morata 82'	Report		Stadium: Wembley Stadium; Attendance: 73,416; Referee: Martin Atkinson

== EFL Cup ==
Southampton were knocked out of the 2017–18 EFL Cup in their first match of the tournament, losing 2–0 in the second round to Championship club Wolverhampton Wanderers. Wolves almost opened the scoring within ten minutes through Nouha Dicko, with Southampton's best chance of the first half coming just before the break as shots from Jan Bednarek and Jérémy Pied were saved by Will Norris, before Dušan Tadić shot wide. Danny Batth opened the scoring for the visitors in the 67th minute when he headed in a corner, before Donovan Wilson doubled the lead 20 minutes later to secure the third round for the Championship side.

23 August 2017 Round 2	Southampton	0–2	Wolverhampton Wanderers	Southampton
19:45 BST		Report	Batth 67'; Wilson 87'	Stadium: St Mary's Stadium; Attendance: 17,931; Referee: James Linington

== Squad statistics ==
No.	Pos.	Nat.	Name	League		FA Cup		EFL Cup		Total		Discipline	
No.	Pos.	Nat.	Name	Apps.	Goals	Apps.	Goals	Apps.	Goals	Apps.	Goals	Yellow card	Red card
2	DF	(Portugal)	Cédric Soares	32	0	4	1	0	0	36	1	3	0
3	DF	(Japan)	Maya Yoshida	23(1)	2	2(1)	0	1	0	26(2)	2	3	1
5	DF	(England)	Jack Stephens	22	2	4	1	1	0	27	3	6	1
6	DF	(Netherlands)	Wesley Hoedt	28	0	4	1	0	0	32	1	8	0
7	FW	(Republic of Ireland)	Shane Long	15(15)	2	3(1)	0	0(1)	0	18(17)	2	6	0
8	MF	(Northern Ireland)	Steven Davis	17(6)	3	2	0	0	0	19(6)	3	0	0
9	FW	(Argentina)	Guido Carrillo	5(2)	0	2(1)	0	0	0	7(3)	0	1	0
10	FW	(England)	Charlie Austin	10(14)	7	1	0	1	0	12(14)	7	3	0
11	MF	(Serbia)	Dušan Tadić	34(2)	6	3(1)	1	1	0	38(3)	7	4	0
13	GK	(England)	Alex McCarthy	18	0	5	0	0	0	23	0	2	0
14	MF	(Spain)	Oriol Romeu	34	1	3(2)	0	1	0	38(2)	1	13	0
16	MF	(England)	James Ward-Prowse	20(10)	3	2	1	1	0	23(10)	4	3	0
18	MF	(Gabon)	Mario Lemina	20(5)	1	3(1)	0	0	0	23(6)	1	4	0
19	MF	(Morocco)	Sofiane Boufal	11(15)	2	3	0	1	0	15(15)	2	1	0
20	FW	(Italy)	Manolo Gabbiadini	11(17)	5	1(3)	0	0(1)	0	12(21)	5	2	0
21	DF	(England)	Ryan Bertrand	35	0	5	0	0	0	40	0	2	0
22	MF	(England)	Nathan Redmond	22(9)	1	1(3)	0	0(1)	0	23(13)	1	3	0
23	MF	(Denmark)	Pierre-Emile Højbjerg	19(4)	0	5	1	0	0	24(4)	1	5	0
26	DF	(France)	Jérémy Pied	2	0	0(1)	0	1	0	3(1)	0	0	0
28	GK	(England)	Stuart Taylor	0	0	0	0	0	0	0	0	0	0
30	DF	(England)	Will Wood	0	0	0	0	0	0	0	0	0	0
32	DF	(England)	Alfie Jones	0	0	0	0	0	0	0	0	0	0
34	MF	(England)	Jake Flannigan	0	0	0	0	0	0	0	0	0	0
35	DF	(Poland)	Jan Bednarek	5	1	2	0	1	0	8	1	2	0
38	DF	(England)	Sam McQueen	1(6)	0	0	0	1	0	2(6)	0	0	0
39	MF	(England)	Josh Sims	1(5)	0	0(1)	0	0	0	1(6)	0	0	0
42	MF	(England)	Jake Hesketh	0	0	0	0	0	0	0	0	1	0
43	DF	(France)	Yan Valery	0	0	0	0	0	0	0	0	0	0
44	GK	(England)	Fraser Forster	20	0	0	0	1	0	21	0	0	0
61	FW	(Republic of Ireland)	Michael Obafemi	0(1)	0	0	0	0	0	0(1)	0	0	0
Players with appearances who left during the season
17	DF	(Netherlands)	Virgil van Dijk	11(1)	0	0	0	0	0	11(1)	0	0	0
Players with appearances who ended the season on loan
33	DF	(England)	Matt Targett	2	0	0	0	0	0	2	0	0	0

=== Most appearances ===
#	Pos.	Nat.	Name	League		FA Cup		EFL Cup		Total		
#	Pos.	Nat.	Name	Starts	Subs	Starts	Subs	Starts	Subs	Starts	Subs	Total
1	MF	(Serbia)	Dušan Tadić	34	2	3	1	1	0	38	3	41
2	DF	(England)	Ryan Bertrand	35	0	5	0	0	0	40	0	40
2	MF	(Spain)	Oriol Romeu	34	0	3	2	1	0	38	2	40
4	DF	(Portugal)	Cédric Soares	32	0	4	0	0	0	36	0	36
4	MF	(England)	Nathan Redmond	22	9	1	3	0	1	23	13	36
6	FW	(Republic of Ireland)	Shane Long	15	15	3	1	0	1	18	17	35
7	MF	(England)	James Ward-Prowse	20	10	2	0	1	0	23	10	33
7	FW	(Italy)	Manolo Gabbiadini	11	17	1	3	0	1	12	21	33
9	DF	(Netherlands)	Wesley Hoedt	28	0	4	0	0	0	32	0	32
10	MF	(Morocco)	Sofiane Boufal	11	15	3	0	1	0	15	15	30

=== Top goalscorers ===
#	Pos.	Nat.	Name	League		FA Cup		EFL Cup		Total		
#	Pos.	Nat.	Name	Goals	Apps.	Goals	Apps.	Goals	Apps.	Goals	Apps.	GPG
1	FW	(England)	Charlie Austin	7	24	0	1	0	1	7	26	0.26
1	MF	(Serbia)	Dušan Tadić	6	36	1	4	0	1	7	41	0.17
3	FW	(Italy)	Manolo Gabbiadini	5	28	0	4	0	1	5	33	0.15
4	MF	(England)	James Ward-Prowse	3	30	1	2	0	1	4	33	0.12
5	MF	(Northern Ireland)	Steven Davis	3	23	0	2	0	0	3	25	0.12
5	DF	(England)	Jack Stephens	2	22	1	4	0	1	3	27	0.11
7	DF	(Japan)	Maya Yoshida	2	23	0	3	0	1	2	27	0.07
7	MF	(Morocco)	Sofiane Boufal	2	26	0	3	0	1	2	30	0.06
7	FW	(Republic of Ireland)	Shane Long	2	30	0	4	0	1	2	35	0.05
10	DF	(Poland)	Jan Bednarek	1	5	0	2	0	1	1	8	0.12
10	MF	(Denmark)	Pierre-Emile Højbjerg	0	23	1	5	0	0	1	28	0.03
10	MF	(Gabon)	Mario Lemina	1	25	0	4	0	0	1	29	0.03
10	DF	(Portugal)	Cédric Soares	0	32	1	4	0	0	1	36	0.02
10	MF	(England)	Nathan Redmond	1	32	0	4	0	1	1	37	0.02
10	MF	(Spain)	Oriol Romeu	1	34	0	5	0	1	1	40	0.02

== Transfers ==
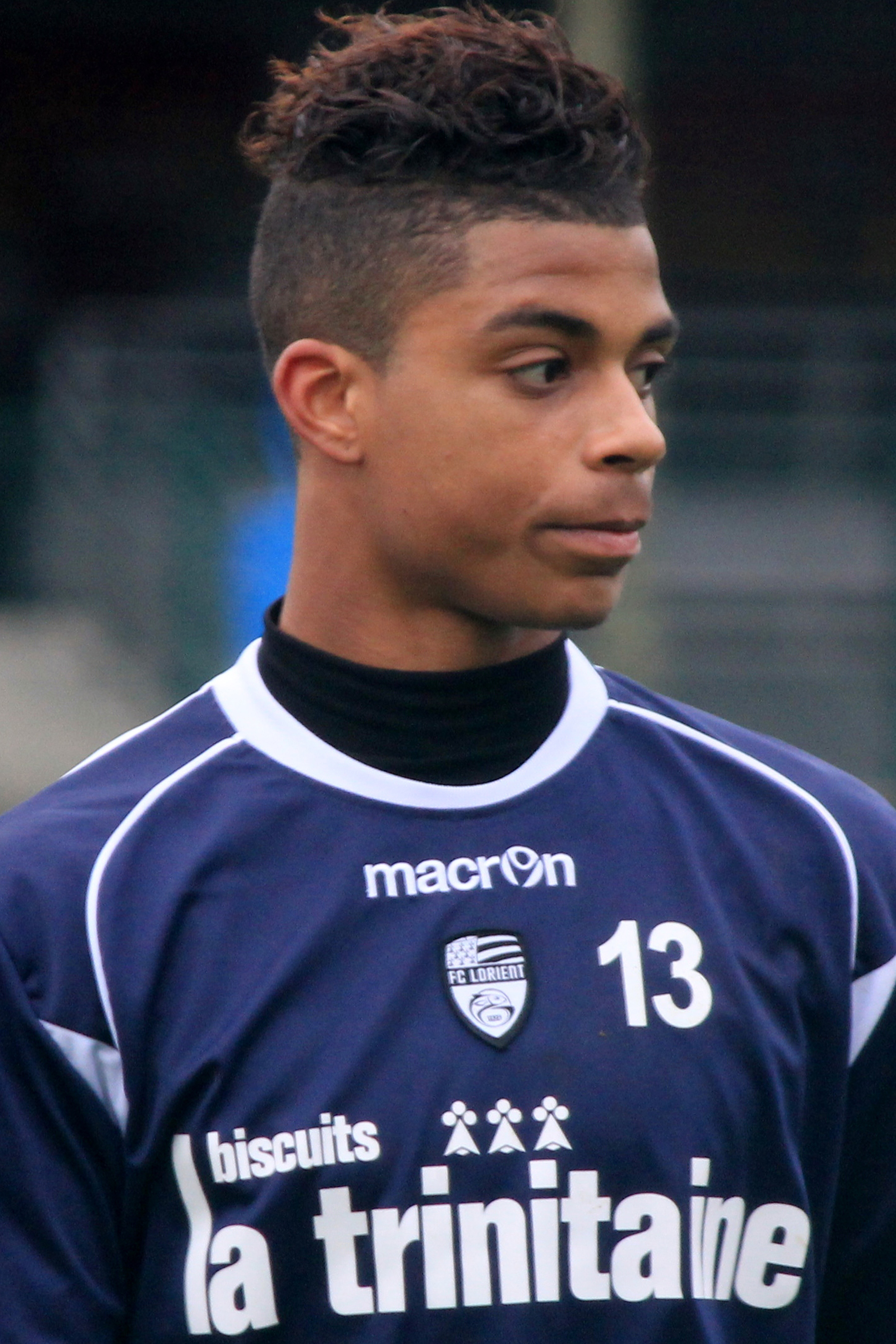
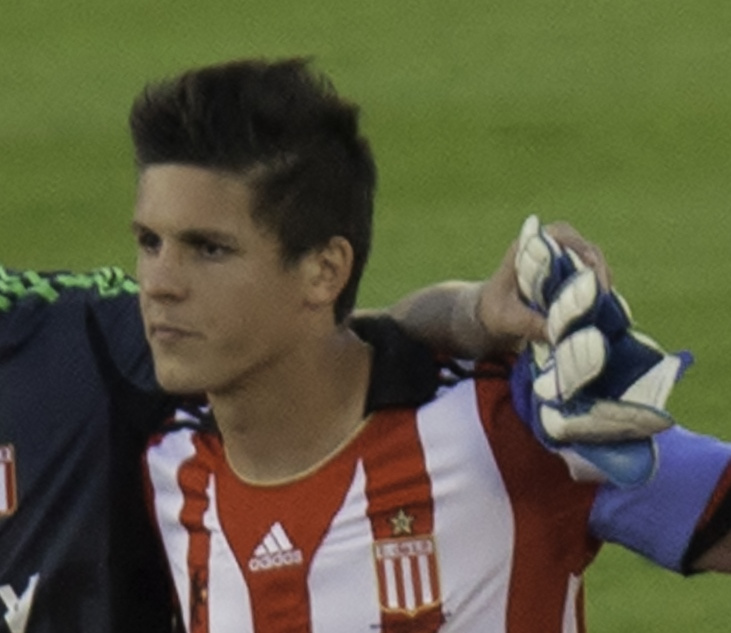
Southampton broke their club record transfer fee twice in the 2017–18 season, first with the £15.4 million purchase of midfielder Mario Lemina in August 2017, and later with the £19 million purchase of striker Guido Carrillo in January 2018.

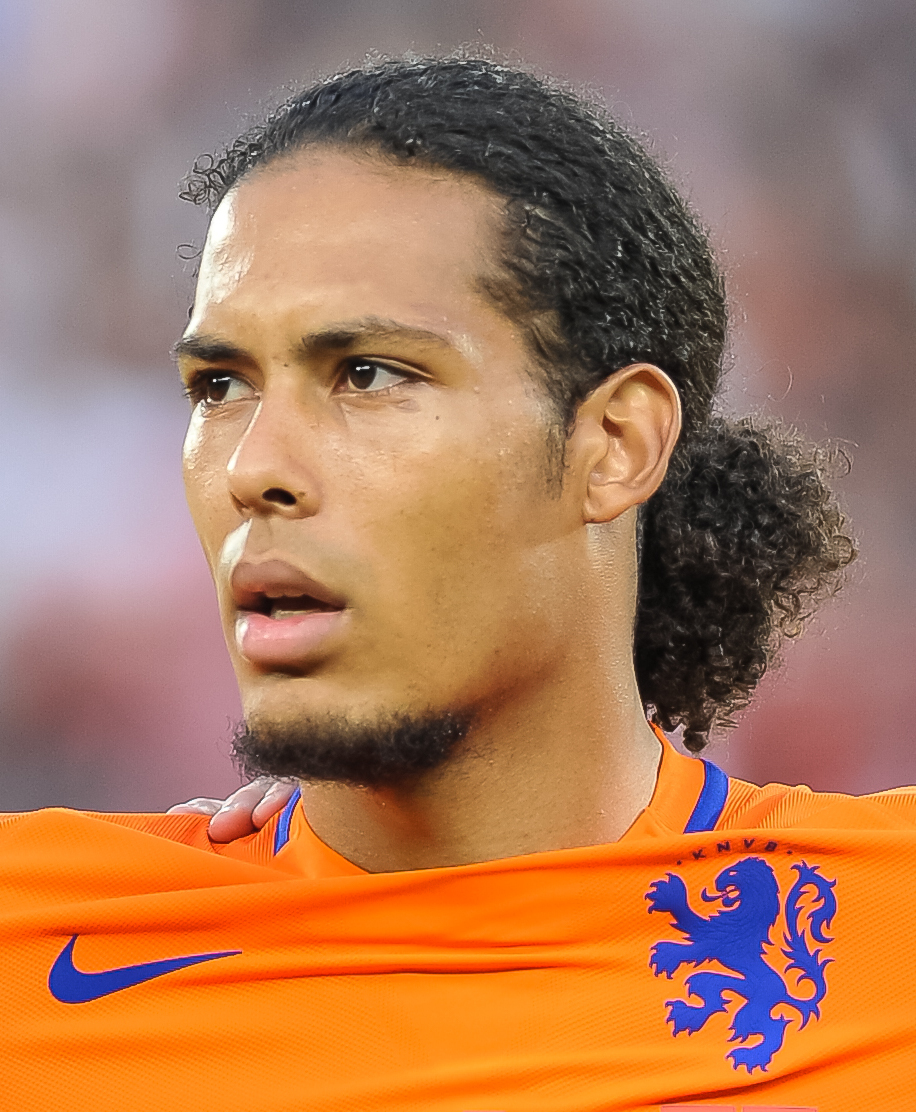
Centre-back Virgil van Dijk left the club to join Liverpool in January for £75 million, a world record fee for a defender.

Players transferred in

Date	Pos.	Name	Club	Fee	Ref.
1 July 2017	DF	(Poland) Jan Bednarek	(Poland) Lech Poznań	£5 million	
8 August 2017	MF	(Gabon) Mario Lemina	(Italy) Juventus	£15.4 million	
14 August 2017	GK	(England) Jack Rose	None (free agent)		
22 August 2017	DF	(Netherlands) Wesley Hoedt	(Italy) Lazio	£15 million	
25 January 2018	FW	(Argentina) Guido Carrillo	(France) AS Monaco	£19 million	

Players transferred out

Date	Pos.	Name	Club	Fee	Ref.
13 June 2017	DF	(England) Jason McCarthy	(England) Barnsley	Undisclosed	
2 July 2017	FW	(England) Jay Rodriguez	(England) West Bromwich Albion	£12 million	
23 August 2017	GK	(Argentina) Paulo Gazzaniga	(England) Tottenham Hotspur	Undisclosed	
1 January 2018	DF	(Netherlands) Virgil van Dijk	(England) Liverpool	£75 million	

Players loaned out

Start date	Pos.	Name	Club	End date	Ref.
5 July 2017	MF	(England) Harrison Reed	(England) Norwich City	End of season	
9 July 2017	FW	(England) Olufela Olomola	(England) Yeovil Town	3 January 2018	
14 July 2017	GK	(England) Harry Lewis	(Scotland) Dundee United	End of season	
21 July 2017	FW	(England) Ryan Seager	(England) Milton Keynes Dons	26 January 2018	
21 August 2017	FW	(England) Sam Gallagher	(England) Birmingham City	End of season	
30 August 2017	MF	(Netherlands) Jordy Clasie	(Belgium) Club Brugge	End of season	
5 January 2018	FW	(England) Marcus Barnes	(England) Yeovil Town	End of season	
22 January 2018	DF	(England) Matt Targett	(England) Fulham	End of season	
26 January 2018	FW	(England) Ryan Seager	(England) Yeovil Town	End of season	
31 January 2018	DF	(England) Ollie Cook	(England) Barrow	End of season	
19 February 2018	DF	(Romania) Florin Gardoș	(Romania) Universitatea Craiova	End of season	

Players released

Date	Pos.	Name	Subsequent club	Join date	Ref.
30 June 2017	MF	(Wales) Lloyd Isgrove	(England) Barnsley	2 July 2017	
30 June 2017	DF	(Curaçao) Cuco Martina	(England) Everton	17 July 2017	
30 June 2017	MF	(Scotland) Harley Willard	(England) Maidstone United	21 July 2017	
30 June 2017	DF	(Uruguay) Martín Cáceres	(Italy) Hellas Verona	4 August 2017	
