= Adam Lovatt =

English footballer (born 1999)

Personal information
- Date of birth: 11 May 1999 (age 27)
- Place of birth: England
- Height: 1.80 m (5 ft 11 in)
- Position: Midfielder

Team information
- Current team: Folkestone Invicta

Youth career
- 2015–2016: Eastbourne Town
- 2016: Eastbourne Borough

Senior career*
| Years | Team | Apps | (Gls) |
| 2016–2017 | Eastbourne Borough | 0 | (0) |
| 2016–2017 | → Hailsham Town (loan) | ? | (?) |
| 2017–2020 | Hastings United | 80 | (0) |
| 2020–2023 | Sutton United | 13 | (0) |
| 2021 | → Tonbridge Angels (loan) | 2 | (0) |
| 2021 | → Tonbridge Angels (loan) | 4 | (0) |
| 2021–2022 | → Tonbridge Angels (loan) | 17 | (0) |
| 2022 | → Dartford (loan) | 4 | (0) |
| 2023 | → Farnborough (loan) | 13 | (0) |
| 2023–2025 | Hastings United | 74 | (1) |
| 2025 | Wingate & Finchley | 4 | (0) |
| 2025 | Hashtag United | 7 | (1) |
| 2025– | Folkestone Invicta | 0 | (0) |
- * Club domestic league appearances and goals as of 20:01, 30 October 2025 (UTC)

Adam Lovatt (born 11 May 1999) is an English professional footballer who plays as a midfielder for National League South club Folkestone Invicta.

== Career ==
=== Early career ===
Lovatt began his career with Eastbourne Town before eventually switching to Eastbourne Borough in 2016. Prior to signing first-team terms in May 2017, Lovatt spent time out on loan at the local side, Hailsham Town in the campaign prior. His spell at Eastbourne Borough was short-lived however, joining Isthmian League side, Hastings United a few months into the 2017–18 campaign.

=== Sutton United ===
Over a three-year stint, Lovatt went onto feature in over 100 games for the Sussex-based side, before earning a move to National League (at the time), Sutton United in November 2020. Prior to making his debut for Sutton in May 2021 in a 2–0 away defeat to Barnet, the midfielder enjoyed a brief loan spell with Tonbridge Angels in January, featuring twice in a disrupted campaign due to the COVID-19 pandemic.

Following Sutton's promotion to League Two, Lovatt signed a new one-year deal and was subsequently sent back to Tonbridge Angels on loan, featuring over 20 times for the National League South side over two spells before returning to his parent club in March 2022. That month, he made his EFL debut during a 2–1 away defeat to Swindon Town, featuring for the full 90 minutes.

On 26 August 2022, Lovatt joined Dartford on an initial three-month loan. However, on 23 September 2022, it was confirmed that Lovatt had been recalled by Sutton United after just a month.

In March 2023, Lovatt joined Farnborough until the end of the season. He was released by Sutton at the end of the 2022–23 season.

=== Return to non-league ===
On 5 August 2023, Lovatt signed for Isthmian League Premier Division club Hastings United.

On 30 July 2025, Lovatt returned to the Isthmian League Premier Division following Hastings' relegation, joining Wingate & Finchley.

In September 2025, Lovatt returned to Isthmian League Premier Division club Hashtag United having previously represented the club's academy. In October 2025, he joined Folkestone Invicta.

== Career statistics ==
As of match played 18 October 2025

Appearances and goals by club, season and competition
| Club | Season | League | | | FA Cup | | League cup | | Other | | Total | |
| Club | Season | Division | Apps | Goals | Apps | Goals | Apps | Goals | Apps | Goals | Apps | Goals |
|---|---|---|---|---|---|---|---|---|---|---|---|---|
| Eastbourne Borough | 2016–17 | National League South | 0 | 0 | 0 | 0 | — | | 0 | 0 | 0 | 0 |
| Hailsham Town (loan) | 2016–17 | Southern Combination League; Premier Division | No data currently available | | | | | | | | | |
| Hastings United | 2017–18 | Isthmian League; South Division | 28 | 0 | 0 | 0 | — | | 2 (Note: Appearances in FA Trophy) | 0 | 30 | 0 |
| Hastings United | 2018–19 | Isthmian League; South East Division | 32 | 0 | 4 | 0 | — | | 4 (Note: One appearance in Alan Turvey Trophy; two appearances in FA Trophy; one appearance in Isthmian League South East Division play-offs) | 0 | 40 | 0 |
| Hastings United | 2019–20 | Isthmian League; South East Division | 20 | 0 | 3 | 0 | — | | 8 (Note: Four appearances in Alan Turvey Trophy; four appearances in FA Trophy) | 0 | 31 | 0 |
| Hastings United | Total | | 80 | 0 | 7 | 0 | 0 | 0 | 14 | 0 | 101 | 0 |
| Sutton United | 2020–21 | National League | 1 | 0 | 0 | 0 | — | | 0 | 0 | 1 | 0 |
| Sutton United | 2021–22 | League Two | 3 | 0 | — | | 0 | 0 | 0 | 0 | 3 | 0 |
| Sutton United | 2022–23 | League Two | 9 | 0 | — | | 0 | 0 | 2 (Note: Appearances in EFL Trophy) | 0 | 11 | 0 |
| Sutton United | Total | | 13 | 0 | 0 | 0 | 0 | 0 | 2 | 0 | 15 | 0 |
| Tonbridge Angels (loan) | 2020–21 | National League South | 2 | 0 | — | | — | | — | | 2 | 0 |
| Tonbridge Angels (loan) | 2021–22 | National League South | 21 | 0 | 1 | 0 | — | | 3 | 0 | 25 | 0 |
| Tonbridge Angels (loan) | Total | | 23 | 0 | 1 | 0 | 0 | 0 | 3 | 0 | 27 | 0 |
| Dartford (loan) | 2022–23 | National League South | 4 | 0 | 1 | 0 | — | | 0 | 0 | 5 | 0 |
| Farnborough (loan) | 2022–23 | National League South | 13 | 0 | 0 | 0 | — | | 0 | 0 | 13 | 0 |
| Hastings United | 2023–24 | Isthmian League; Premier Division | 38 | 1 | 2 | 0 | — | | 7 (Note: One appearance in FA Trophy; four appearances in Sussex Senior Cup; two appearances in Alan Turvey Trophy) | 0 | 47 | 1 |
| Hastings United | 2024–25 | Isthmian League; Premier Division | 36 | 0 | 3 | 0 | — | | 4 (Note: One appearance in FA Trophy; one appearance in Sussex Senior Cup; two appearances, one goal in Alan Turvey Trophy) | 1 | 43 | 1 |
| Hastings United | Total | | 74 | 1 | 5 | 0 | 0 | 0 | 11 | 1 | 90 | 2 |
| Wingate & Finchley | 2025–26 | Isthmian League; Premier Division | 4 | 0 | 0 | 0 | — | | 0 | 0 | 4 | 0 |
| Hashtag United | 2025–26 | Isthmian League; Premier Division | 7 | 1 | 0 | 0 | — | | 0 | 0 | 7 | 1 |
| Career total | | | 218 | 2 | 14 | 0 | 0 | 0 | 30 | 1 | 262 | 3 |
