= 2022–23 Sutton United F.C. season =

Sutton United
2022–23 season
- Chairman: Bruce Elliott
- Manager: Matt Gray
- Stadium: Gander Green Lane
- League Two: 14th
- FA Cup: First round (eliminated by Farnborough)
- EFL Cup: First round (eliminated by Milton Keynes Dons)
- EFL Trophy: Second round (eliminated by AFC Wimbledon)
- Top goalscorer: League: Omar Bugiel; Will Randall (6); All: Omar Bugiel; Will Randall (6)
- Highest home attendance: 5,049 v AFC Wimbledon, 1 January 2023
- Lowest home attendance: 971 v Oxford United, 18 October 2022
- Average home league attendance: 3,254
- Biggest win: 3-0 v Crawley Town, 7 March 2023
- Biggest defeat: 0-3 v Stevenage, 4 October 2022; 0-3 v Stockport County, 29 October 2022
Home colours	Away colours

The 2022–23 season is the 96th season in the existence of Sutton United Football Club and the club's second consecutive season in League Two. In addition to the league, they will also compete in the 2022–23 FA Cup, the 2022–23 EFL Cup and the 2022–23 EFL Trophy.

== Pre-season and friendlies ==
On 27 May Sutton United announced their first two pre-season friendlies, against Dorking Wanderers and Havant & Waterlooville. Four days later, a home fixture against Woking was added to the calendar. On 1 June a home friendly against Bromley was announced. A third home friendly, against Charlton Athletic was also scheduled for the U's. The sixth and final friendly to be confirmed was against Dulwich Hamlet.

Win Draw Loss Fixtures

5 July 2022 Friendly	Dorking Wanderers	1–2	Sutton United	Dorking
19:45 BST	Barden 8' (o.g.)	Report	Wilson 11'; Rowe (yellow card) 67'; Randall 73'	Stadium: Meadowbank

9 July 2022 Friendly	Havant & Waterlooville	1–2	Sutton United	Havant
15:00 BST	Prior 20'	Report	Thomas 48'; Beautyman 57' (pen.)	Stadium: West Leigh Park

12 July 2022 Friendly	Dulwich Hamlet	0–2	Sutton United	East Dulwich
19:30 BST		Report	Smith 7'; Trialist 15'	Stadium: Champion Hill

16 July 2022 Friendly	Sutton United	0–0	Charlton Athletic	Sutton
15:00 BST		Report		Stadium: VBS Community Stadium; Attendance: 1,245

19 July 2022 Friendly	Sutton United	0–1	Woking	Sutton
19:45 BST		Report	Amond 68'	Stadium: VBS Community Stadium

23 July 2022 Friendly	Sutton United	3–2	Bromley	Sutton
15:00 BST	Smith 50'; Randall 75'; Milsom 81' (pen.)	Report	Reynolds 13'; Krauhaus 84'	Stadium: VBS Community Stadium

== Competitions ==
=== Overall record ===
Competition	First match	Last match	Starting round	Final position	Record							
Competition	First match	Last match	Starting round	Final position	Pld	W	D	L	GF	GA	GD	Win %
League Two	30 July 2022	8 May 2023	Matchday 1	14th	46	15	13	18	46	58	−12	32.61
FA Cup	5 November 2022	5 November 2022	First round	First round	1	0	0	1	0	2	−2	0.00
EFL Cup	9 August 2022	9 August 2022	First round	First round	1	0	0	1	0	1	−1	0.00
EFL Trophy	31 August 2022	22 November 2022	Group stage	Second round	4	2	0	2	4	4	+0	50.00
Total					52	17	13	22	50	65	−15	32.69

Last updated: 8 May 2023
Source: Competitions

=== League Two ===
==== League table ====
Pos	Team	Pld	W	D	L	GF	GA	GD	Pts
11	Grimsby Town	46	16	13	17	49	56	−7	61
12	Tranmere Rovers	46	15	13	18	45	48	−3	58
13	Crewe Alexandra	46	14	16	16	48	60	−12	58
14	Sutton United	46	15	13	18	46	58	−12	58
15	Newport County	46	14	15	17	53	56	−3	57
16	Walsall	46	12	19	15	46	49	−3	55
17	Gillingham	46	14	13	19	36	49	−13	55

Source: EFL Official Website
Rules for classification: 1) Points; 2) Goal difference; 3) Number of goals scored; 4) Head-to-head results; 5) Wins; 6) Away goals; 7) Penalty points (sec 9.5); 8) 12-point sending off offences

==== Results summary ====
Overall								Home						Away					
Pld	W	D	L	GF	GA	GD	Pts	W	D	L	GF	GA	GD	W	D	L	GF	GA	GD
46	15	13	18	46	58	−12	58	11	5	7	26	21	+5	4	8	11	20	37	−17

Last updated: 8 May 2023.

==== Results by round ====
Round	1	2	3	4	5	6	7	8	9	10	11	12	13	14	15	16	17	18	19	20	21	22	23	24	25	26	27	28	29	30	31	32	33	34	35	36	37	38	39	40	41	42	43	44	45	46
Ground	H	A	H	A	A	H	H	A	H	H	A	A	H	A	H	A	A	H	H	A	H	A	A	H	H	A	A	A	H	A	H	H	A	H	H	A	H	A	A	H	A	H	H	A	A	H
Result	D	L	W	L	D	W	W	L	W	L	L	L	L	W	D	D	L	L	W	D	W	L	W	W	W	D	L	W	D	D	W	W	W	D	W	D	L	D	D	L	L	L	L	L	L	D
Position	12	16	13	16	15	13	11	12	10	13	14	14	15	14	14	15	17	17	17	17	16	16	15	15	12	12	14	11	11	13	10	9	9	9	9	9	9	9	10	10	10	10	10	12	13	14

Updated to match(es) played on 29 April 2023. Source:
A = Away; H = Home; W = Win; D = Draw; L = Loss; P = Postponed

==== Matches ====
Win Draw Loss Fixtures

On 23 June, the league fixtures were announced.

30 July 2022 1	Sutton United	1–1	Newport County	Sutton
15:00 BST	Goodliffe (yellow card) 10'; Bugiel 24', (yellow card) 56'; Rowe (yellow card) 89'	Report	Norman (yellow card) 10'; Bogle 38'; Bowen (yellow card) 72'; Bennett (yellow card) 74'	Stadium: VBS Community Stadium; Attendance: 3,169 (483 away); Referee: Sam Purkiss

6 August 2022 2	Doncaster Rovers	2–1	Sutton United	Doncaster
15:00 BST	Clayton (yellow card) 59'; Miller 90+2'; Agard 90+4'	Report	Wilson 16'; Kizzi (yellow card) 45'; Smith (yellow card) 67'; Bugiel (yellow card) 75'	Stadium: Eco-Power Stadium; Attendance: 5,720 (204 away); Referee: Ben Speedie

13 August 2022 3	Sutton United	1–0	Barrow	Sutton
15:00 BST	Fadahunsi 79'	Report	Stevens (yellow card) 88'	Stadium: VBS Community Stadium; Attendance: 2,276 (126 away); Referee: Andy Davies

16 August 2022 4	Crewe Alexandra	1–0	Sutton United	Crewe
19:45 BST	Baker-Richardson 12'; Uwakwe (yellow card) 87'	Report	Eastmond (yellow card) 38'; Beautyman (yellow card) 58'	Stadium: Mornflake Stadium; Attendance: 3,452 (117 away); Referee: Thomas Parsons

20 August 2022 5	Grimsby Town	0–0	Sutton United	Grimsby
15:00 BST	Waterfall (yellow card) 42'; Holohan (yellow card) 47'; Green (yellow card) 86'	Report	John (yellow card) 34'; Boldewijn (yellow card) 86'	Stadium: Blundell Park; Attendance: 6,239 (105 away); Referee: Martin Woods

27 August 2022 6	Sutton United	2–1	Mansfield Town	Sutton
15:00 BST	Rowe (yellow card) 15'; Kizzi (yellow card) 37'; Neufville 44'; Thomas (yellow card) 56'; Fadahunsi 82'	Report	O'Toole (yellow card) 28'; Quinn (yellow card) 68'; Hawkins 75'	Stadium: VBS Community Stadium; Attendance: 2,664 (372 away); Referee: Lee Swabey

3 September 2022 7	Sutton United	2–1	Harrogate Town	Sutton
15:00 BST	Beautyman 21'; Kouassi 70'; Rose (yellow card) 90+5'	Report	Richards (yellow card) 26'; Armstrong 45+2' (pen.); Austerfeld (yellow card) 48'; Horbury (red card) 73'	Stadium: VBS Community Stadium; Attendance: 2,402 (69 away); Referee: Neil Hair

10 September 2022	Stevenage	Postponed	Sutton United	Stevenage
15:00 BST				Stadium: Lamex Stadium
Note: Fixture was postponed as a mark of respect following the passing of Queen Elizabeth II.

13 September 2022 8	Swindon Town	3–2	Sutton United	Swindon
19:45 BST	Clayton (yellow card) 27'; Shade 35'; Williams 38'; Lavinier (yellow card) 68'; Wakeling 90+2'	Report	Randall 4', 42'; Bugiel (yellow card) 31'; Barden (yellow card) 81'	Stadium: The County Ground; Attendance: 7,589 (85 away); Referee: Darren Handley

17 September 2022 9	Sutton United	2–0	Hartlepool United	Sutton
15:00 BST	Randall 53'; Beautyman 66'	Report	Crawford (yellow card) 66'	Stadium: VBS Community Stadium; Attendance: 2,766 (162 away); Referee: Will Finnie

24 September 2022 10	Sutton United	1–2	Salford City	Sutton
15:00 BST	Neufville 62'; Wilson (red card) 68'; Beautyman (yellow card) 90+7'	Report	Watt (yellow card) 44'; Vassell (yellow card) 68'; Lund 80'; Watson 87'; Hendry (yellow card) 90+5'	Stadium: VBS Community Stadium; Attendance: 3,404 (116 away); Referee: Robert Lewis

1 October 2022 11	Gillingham	1–0	Sutton United	Gillingham
15:00 BST	MacDonald 90+1'	Report	John (yellow card) 58'; Eastmond (yellow card) 74'	Stadium: Priestfield Stadium; Attendance: 4,153 (255 away); Referee: David Rock

4 October 2022 12	Stevenage	3–0	Sutton United	Stevenage
19:45 BST	Sweeney 28', (yellow card) 64'; Norris 48', 70'; Gilbey (yellow card) 77'	Report	Eastmond (yellow card) 24'; Milsom (yellow card) 52'; Barden (yellow card) 67'; John (yellow card) 74'; Thomas (yellow card) 90+5'	Stadium: Lamex Stadium; Attendance: 2,471 (160 away); Referee: Ollie Yates

8 October 2022 13	Sutton United	0–2	Tranmere Rovers	Sutton
15:00 BST	Craig Eastmond (yellow card) 36'	Report	Hemmings 19' (pen.); Merrie (yellow card) 22'; Lewis 45+4'; Hawkes (yellow card) 59'	Stadium: VBS Community Stadium; Attendance: 3,007 (356 away); Referee: Darren Drysdale

15 October 2022 14	AFC Wimbledon	0–1	Sutton United	Wimbledon
15:00 BST	Pell (yellow card) 13'; Maghoma (yellow card) 71'	Report	Eastmond 30'; Bugiel (yellow card) 55'; Randall (yellow card) 77'; Milsom (yellow card) 84'	Stadium: Cherry Red Records Stadium; Attendance: 8,568 (1,200 away); Referee: Carl Brook

22 October 2022 15	Sutton United	1–1	Walsall	Sutton
15:00 BST	Randall (yellow card) 45+9'; Milsom 72' (pen.)	Report	White (yellow card) 7'; Comley (yellow card) 17' (yellow-red card) 26'; Maddox 86'	Stadium: VBS Community Stadium; Attendance: 2,773 (349 away); Referee: Paul Howard

25 October 2022 16	Northampton Town	2–2	Sutton United	Northampton
19:45 BST	Leonard 15'; Pinnock 37'; Hoskins (yellow card) 73'	Report	Milsom (yellow card) 24'; Hart (yellow card) 39'; Bugiel 47'; Wilson 61'	Stadium: Sixfields Stadium; Attendance: 4,800 (159 away); Referee: Ross Joyce

29 October 2022 17	Stockport County	3–0	Sutton United	Edgeley
15:00 BST	Brown (yellow card) 1'; Wootton 19'; Madden 57'; Collar 72'	Report	Bugiel (red card) 3'; John (yellow card) 38'; Hart (yellow card) 90+2'	Stadium: Edgeley Park; Attendance: 8,091 (129 away); Referee: Simon Mather

12 November 2022 18	Sutton United	0–2	Bradford City	Sutton
15:00 GMT		Report	Cook (yellow card) 3', (goal) 37'; Songo'o (yellow card) 12'; Banks 51'; Chapman (yellow card) 73'	Stadium: VBS Community Stadium; Attendance: 3,323 (755 away); Referee: James Oldham

19 November 2022 19	Sutton United	1–0	Rochdale	Sutton
15:00 GMT	Randall 38'	Report		Stadium: VBS Community Stadium; Attendance: 2,954 (241 away); Referee: Sam Allison

3 December 2022 20	Carlisle United	1–1	Sutton United	Carlisle
13:00 GMT	Edmondson 30'; Guy (yellow card) 45+3'; Whelan (yellow card) 90+3'	Report	Randall 45'; Eastmond (yellow card) 71'; Hart (yellow card) 90+3'; Kizzi (yellow card) 90+4'	Stadium: Brunton Park; Attendance: 4,752 (70 away); Referee: Lewis Smith

10 December 2022 21	Sutton United	1–0	Colchester United	Sutton
15:00 GMT	Milsom 45+9' (pen.); Boldewijn (yellow card) 67'; Randall (yellow card) 69'; Kizzi (yellow card) 90+5'	Report	Smith (yellow card) 18'; Ashley (yellow card) 45+1' (yellow-red card) 52'; Tchamadeu (yellow card) 69'; Tovide (yellow card) 90+5'	Stadium: VBS Community Stadium; Attendance: 2,528 (275 away); Referee: Peter Wright

17 December 2022 22	Leyton Orient	2–0	Sutton United	Leyton
15:00 GMT	El Mizouni (yellow card) 2'; Smyth 62'; Smith 79' (o.g.); Archibald (yellow card) 89'	Report	John (yellow card) 32'	Stadium: Brisbane Road; Attendance: 8,069 (562 away); Referee: Bobby Madden

26 December 2022 23	Crawley Town	1–2	Sutton United	Crawley
15:00 GMT	Craig (yellow card) 69'; Oteh 90+5'	Report	Kizzi 61'; Milsom 70' (pen.); Randall (yellow card) 83'; Boldewijn (yellow card) 84'	Stadium: The People's Pension Stadium; Attendance: 2,926 (404 away); Referee: Neil Hair

29 December 2022 24	Sutton United	2–1	Gillingham	Sutton
19:45 GMT	Baggott 43' (o.g.); Eastmond (yellow card) 54', (goal) 90+3'; Bugiel (yellow card) 71'	Report	Jeffries (yellow card) 14'; McKenzie 78'	Stadium: VBS Community Stadium; Attendance: 3,316 (774 away); Referee: Thomas Parsons

1 January 2023 25	Sutton United	2–1	AFC Wimbledon	Sutton
15:00 GMT	Randall 13'; Bugiel (yellow card) 62', (goal) 69'	Report	Woodyard (yellow card) 9'; Davison 40'	Stadium: VBS Community Stadium; Attendance: 5,049 (1,491 away); Referee: Will Finnie

7 January 2023 26	Tranmere Rovers	2–2	Sutton United	Birkenhead
15:00 GMT	Hawkes 39'; Mumbongo (yellow card) 42'; Hemmings 58', (yellow card) 64'; Morris (yellow card) 64'; O'Connor (yellow card) 90+6'	Report	Smith 11', 61'; Eastmond (yellow card) 64'; Bugiel (yellow card) 77'	Stadium: Prenton Park; Attendance: 5,348 (118 away); Referee: Marc Edwards

14 January 2023 27	Salford City	2–0	Sutton United	Salford
15:00 GMT	McAleny 9', 45+1'; Smith (yellow card) 61'; Leak (yellow card) 65'; Touray (yellow card) 89'	Report	Milsom (penalty missed) 70'; Eastmond (yellow card) 76'; Bugiel (yellow card) 89'	Stadium: The Peninsula Stadium; Attendance: 2,228 (120 away); Referee: Lee Swabey

21 January 2023	Sutton United	Postponed	Crawley Town	Sutton
15:00 GMT				Stadium: VBS Community Stadium
Note: Fixture was postponed due to a frozen pitch.

28 January 2023 28	Harrogate Town	0–1	Sutton United	Harrogate
15:00 GMT	Folarin (yellow card) 11'	Report	Ajiboye 8'; Goodliffe (yellow card) 58'	Stadium: EnviroVent Stadium; Attendance: 2,356 (141 away); Referee: Anthony Backhouse

4 February 2023 29	Sutton United	0–0	Stevenage	Sutton
15:00 GMT	Boldewijn (yellow card) 51'	Report	Roberts (yellow card) 1'; Forster-Caskey (yellow card) 90+1'	Stadium: VBS Community Stadium; Attendance: 3,167 (539 away); Referee: Thomas Kirk

11 February 2023 30	Hartlepool United	2–2	Sutton United	Hartlepool
15:00 GMT	Finney (yellow card) 13'; Kemp 43'; Dodds 45+3'; Ferguson (yellow card) 73'	Report	Ajiboye 18'; Angol 31'; Eastmond (yellow card) 34' (yellow-red card) 37'; Bugiel (yellow card) 58'; Kizzi (yellow card) 81'	Stadium: Suit Direct Stadium; Attendance: 4,385 (98 away); Referee: Andy Haines

14 February 2023 31	Sutton United	2–1	Swindon Town	Sutton
19:45 GMT	Rowe (yellow card) 41'; Bugiel (yellow card) 59'; Angol 85'; Smith 88'	Report	Austin 14'; McEachran (yellow card) 31'; Iandolo (yellow card) 86'; Blake-Tracy (yellow card) 87'	Stadium: VBS Community Stadium; Attendance: 2,928 (608 away); Referee: David Rock

18 February 2023 32	Sutton United	2–0	Doncaster Rovers	Sutton
15:00 GMT	Rowe 49'; Dennis (yellow card) 81'; Ajiboye 88'	Report	Nelson (yellow card) 80'	Stadium: VBS Community Stadium; Attendance: 3,163 (501 away); Referee: Darren Drysdale

25 February 2023 33	Newport County	0–2	Sutton United	Newport
15:00 GMT		Report	Rowe 9'; Smith 65'; Angol (yellow card) 79'	Stadium: Rodney Parade; Attendance: 3,968 (223 away); Referee: Tom Nield

4 March 2023 34	Sutton United	1–1	Crewe Alexandra	Sutton
15:00 GMT	Eastmond (yellow card) 82'; Rowe 90+3'	Report	Tabiner (yellow card) 20'; Agyei 33'; Finnigan (yellow card) 35'; McDonald (red card) 63'	Stadium: VBS Community Stadium; Attendance: 3,594 (372 away); Referee: Daniel Middleton

7 March 2023 35	Sutton United	3–0	Crawley Town	Sutton
19:45 GMT	Bugiel 40', 47'; Angol 88'	Report	Mutch (yellow card) 38'; Lynch (yellow card) 72' (yellow-red card) 82'	Stadium: VBS Community Stadium; Attendance: 3,253 (496 away); Referee: Tom Reeves

11 March 2023 36	Barrow	0–0	Sutton United	Barrow-in-Furness
15:00 GMT	Neal (yellow card) 20'	Report		Stadium: Holker Street; Attendance: 3,696 (61 away); Referee: Oliver Langford

14 March 2023 37	Sutton United	0–1	Grimsby Town	Sutton
19:45 GMT	Milsom (yellow card) 12'; Beautyman (yellow card) 79'; Rowe (yellow card) 90+7'; Kizzi (yellow card) 90+7'	Report	Efete 34'; Amos (yellow card) 38'; Clifton (yellow card) 66'	Stadium: VBS Community Stadium; Attendance: 2,751 (273 away); Referee: Andy Davies

25 March 2023 38	Mansfield Town	0–0	Sutton United	Mansfield
15:00 GMT	Gale (yellow card) 47'	Report	Bugiel (yellow card) 40'; Kizzi (yellow card) 70'; Randall (yellow card) 77'; Beautyman (yellow card) 79'	Stadium: One Call Stadium; Attendance: 6,288 (196 away); Referee: Simon Mather

1 April 2023 39	Walsall	1–1	Sutton United	Bescot
15:00 BST	Labadie (yellow card) 78'; Matt (yellow card) 90'; Hutchinson 90+5'	Report	Bugiel (yellow card) 27'; Smith 31'; Kizzi (yellow card) 90+4'	Stadium: Poundland Bescot Stadium; Attendance: 4,809 (201 away); Referee: Thomas Parsons

7 April 2023 40	Sutton United	0–1	Stockport County	Sutton
15:00 BST	Smith (yellow card) 29'; Hart (yellow card) 83'	Report	Croasdale (yellow card) 28'; Stretton 53'; Collar (yellow card) 65'; Hippolyte (yellow card) 85'	Stadium: VBS Community Stadium; Attendance: 4,258 (702 away); Referee: Neil Hair

10 April 2023 41	Bradford City	3–1	Sutton United	Bradford
15:00 BST	Banks 12', (yellow card) 43'; Ridehalgh (yellow card) 35'; Chapman 63'; Cook 71'	Report	Angol (penalty missed) 31', (yellow card) 40'; Bugiel 80'; Rowe (yellow card) 84'	Stadium: Valley Parade; Attendance: 17,769 (147 away); Referee: Ross Joyce

15 April 2023 42	Sutton United	0–2	Leyton Orient	Sutton
15:00 BST	Angol (yellow card) 22'	Report	Sadlier 14'; James 26', (yellow card) 57'; Sotiriou (yellow card) 73'	Stadium: VBS Community Stadium; Attendance: 4,828 (1,493 away); Referee: James Oldham

18 April 2023 43	Sutton United	1–2	Northampton Town	Sutton
19:45 BST	Randall (yellow card) 26'; Wilson 45+3'; Rowe (yellow card) 50'; Bugiel (yellow card) 84'	Report	Appéré 32'; Pinnock 50'; Leonard (yellow card) 87'; Hylton (yellow card) 90+3'	Stadium: VBS Community Stadium; Attendance: 2,760 (625 away); Referee: David Rock

22 April 2023 44	Colchester United	4–1	Sutton United	Colchester
15:00 BST	Chambers 19'; Akinde 26'; Tchamadeu 41'; Chilvers 63'	Report	Ajiboye 11'; Boldewijn (yellow card) 66'	Stadium: JobServe Community Stadium; Attendance: 3,851 (275 away); Referee: Carl Brook

29 April 2023 45	Rochdale	4–1	Sutton United	Rochdale
15:00 BST	Rodney 8', 56'; Brierley 25'; Keohane 50'; Odoh (yellow card) 90'	Report	House (red card) 29'; Wilson 38'; Beautyman (yellow card) 64'; Smith (yellow card) 83'	Stadium: Crown Oil Arena; Attendance: 3,148 (112 away); Referee: Ben Toner

8 May 2023 46	Sutton United	1–1	Carlisle United	Sutton
12:30 BST	Kouassi 17'	Report	Robinson (yellow card) 46'; Kizzi 85' (o.g.)	Stadium: VBS Community Stadium; Attendance: 4,771 (1,366 away); Referee: Darren Drysdale

=== FA Cup ===
The U's were drawn at home to Farnborough in the first round.

Win Draw Loss Fixtures

5 November 2022 First round	Sutton United	0–2	Farnborough	Sutton
15:00 GMT	Boldewijn (yellow card) 53'; Gambin (yellow card) 89'; Kouassi (yellow card) 90+3'	Report	Fernandez 86'; Amartey 90+6'	Stadium: VBS Community Stadium; Attendance: 1,929 (510 away); Referee: Alan Young

=== EFL Cup ===
Sutton were drawn away to Milton Keynes Dons in the first round.

Win Draw Loss Fixtures

9 August 2022 First round	Milton Keynes Dons	1–0	Sutton United	Denbigh
19:45 BST	Grant 41'	Report		Stadium: Stadium MK; Attendance: 2,263 (273 away); Referee: Charles Breakspear

=== EFL Trophy ===
On 20 June, the initial Group stage draw was made, grouping Sutton United with Oxford United and Leyton Orient. Three days later, Chelsea U21s joined Southern Group G. In the second round, Sutton were drawn away to AFC Wimbledon.

Pos	Div	Team	Pld	W	PW	PL	L	GF	GA	GD	Pts	Qualification
1	ACA	Chelsea U21	3	2	0	0	1	5	4	+1	6	Advance to Round 2
2	L2	Sutton United	3	2	0	0	1	4	3	+1	6	Advance to Round 2
3	L1	Oxford United	3	1	0	0	2	6	4	+2	3	
4	L2	Leyton Orient	3	1	0	0	2	5	9	−4	3	

Source: EFL.com

Win Draw Loss Fixtures

31 August 2022 Group stage	Sutton United	1–0	Chelsea U21	Sutton
19:45 BST	Fadahunsi 5'; Milsom (yellow card) 86'; Smith (yellow card) 90+1'	Report	Brooking (yellow card) 11'; Casadei (yellow card) 76' (yellow-red card) 85'; Gilchrist (yellow card) 90+5'	Stadium: VBS Community Stadium; Attendance: 2,189 (348 away); Referee: Alan Young

20 September 2022 Group stage	Leyton Orient	3–1	Sutton United	Leyton
19:00 BST	Wareham 5', 10'; Sotiriou (yellow card) 60'; James (yellow card) 80', (goal) 90+1'; Sargeant (yellow card) 83'	Report	Kouassi 12'; Eastmond (yellow card) 52' (yellow-red card) 90'; Barden (yellow card) 82'	Stadium: Breyer Group Stadium; Attendance: 1,073 (161 away); Referee: Sam Allison

18 October 2022 Group stage	Sutton United	2–0	Oxford United	Sutton
19:45 BST	Rowe 48'; Kouassi 64' (pen.); Lovatt (yellow card) 67'; Bugiel (yellow card) 74'	Report		Stadium: VBS Community Stadium; Attendance: 971 (217 away); Referee: Sunny Gill

22 November 2022 Second round	AFC Wimbledon	1–0	Sutton United	Wimbledon
19:45 GMT	Hudlin 17', (yellow card) 61'; Biler (yellow card) 87'; Broome (yellow card) 90+6'	Report	Bugiel (yellow card) 56'; John (yellow card) 90+6'	Stadium: The Cherry Red Records Stadium; Attendance: 1,854; Referee: Sam Purkiss

== Transfers ==
=== Transfers in ===
Date	Position	Nationality	Name	From	Fee	Ref.
1 July 2022 (Note: The transfer was announced on 28 June, and would become official on 1 July, once his Oldham Athletic contract expired)	LB	(England)	Sam Hart	(England) Oldham Athletic	Free transfer	
1 July 2022	GK	(England)	Jack Rose	(England) Walsall	Free transfer	
1 July 2022	CF	(England)	Kwame Thomas	(Wales) Wrexham	Free transfer	
16 July 2022	CF	(England)	Tope Fadahunsi	(England) Loughborough University	Free transfer	
16 July 2022	LW	(Malta)	Luke Gambin	(Malta) Ħamrun Spartans	Free transfer	
16 July 2022	CB	(England)	Matt Ridley	(England) Whitby Town	Free transfer	
19 July 2022	CB	(England)	Tobi Ogundega	(England) Milton Keynes Dons	Free transfer	
29 August 2022	CB	(Grenada)	Aaron Pierre	(England) Shrewsbury Town	Free transfer	
1 September 2022	GK	(England)	Lewis Ward	(England) Swindon Town	Undisclosed	
11 January 2023	CF	(England)	Lee Angol	(England) Bradford City	Undisclosed	
27 January 2023	CF	(France)	Hisham Kasimu	(England) Farnborough	Undisclosed	

=== Loans in ===
Date from	Position	Nationality	Name	From	Date until	Ref.
9 July 2022	RW	(England)	Josh Neufville	(England) Luton Town	End of season	
30 August 2022	CF	(England)	Charley Kendall	(England) Lincoln City	4 January 2023 (Note: On 4 January, Kendall was recalled to Lincoln)	
1 January 2023 (Note: The loan was announced on 30 December, and would become active on 1 January, once the transfer window re-opened)	RW	(England)	David Ajiboye	(England) Peterborough United	End of season	
27 January 2023	CF	(England)	Matthew Dennis	(England) Milton Keynes Dons	End of season	
31 January 2023	GK	(England)	Tyla Dickinson	(England) Wycombe Wanderers	End of season	

=== Transfers out ===
Date	Position	Nationality	Name	To	Fee	Ref.
22 June 2022	RW	(England)	David Ajiboye	(England) Peterborough United	Undisclosed	
23 June 2022	CF	(England)	Richie Bennett	(England) Barrow	Undisclosed	
30 June 2022	GK	(Australia)	Dean Bouzanis	(England) Reading	Released	
30 June 2022	CM	(England)	Kenny Davis	(England) Farnborough	Released	
30 June 2022	LW	(England)	Ricky Korboa	(England) Woking	Released	
30 June 2022	GK	(England)	Stuart Nelson	(England) Dover Athletic	Released	
30 June 2022	LB	(England)	Ben Wyatt	(England) Torquay United	Released	
5 September 2022	FW	(England)	Jonas Mukuna	(England) Walsall	Free Transfer	
31 January 2023	GK	(England)	Lewis Ward		Released	
31 January 2023	CB	(Grenada)	Aaron Pierre	(England) AFC Wimbledon	Undisclosed	

=== Loans out ===
Start date	Position	Nationality	Name	To	Date until	Ref.
31 July 2022	CB	(England)	Tobi Ogundega	(England) Kingstonian		
26 August 2022	RB	(England)	Roman Charles-Cook	(England) Cray Wanderers	17 October 2022	
26 August 2022	CM	(England)	Adam Lovatt	(England) Dartford	23 September 2022	
26 August 2022	CB	(England)	Matt Ridley	(England) Chesham United	4 November 2022	
5 November 2022	CM	(England)	Gucci Soulya-Osekanongo	(England) Corinthian-Casuals		
5 November 2022	CF	(England)	Kai Tanner	(England) Corinthian-Casuals		
7 November 2022	GK	(England)	Brad House	(England) Havant & Waterlooville	13 January 2023 (Note: On 13 January, House was recalled by Sutton)	
19 January 2023	CF	(England)	Tope Fadahunsi	(England) Torquay United	End of season	
19 January 2023	CF	(England)	Kwame Thomas	(Scotland) Dundee	End of season	
31 January 2023	CB	(England)	Tobi Ogundega	(England) Salisbury	End of season	
10 March 2023	CB	(England)	Matt Ridley	(England) Chesham United	End of Season	
14 March 2023	CM	(England)	Adam Lovatt	(England) Farnborough	End of Season	

== Squad statistics ==
=== Appearances ===
No.	Pos.	Nat.	Name	EFL League Two		EFL Cup		EFL Trophy		FA Cup		Total	
No.	Pos.	Nat.	Name	Apps	Starts	Apps	Starts	Apps	Starts	Apps	Starts	Apps	Starts
1	GK	(England)	Jack Rose	37	36	1	1	1	1	0	0	39	38
2	DF	(England)	Jonathan Barden	7	4	1	0	2	2	0	0	10	6
3	DF	(England)	Sam Hart	20	13	0	0	3	3	1	1	24	17
4	DF	(England)	Coby Rowe	29	28	1	1	3	2	1	1	34	32
5	DF	(England)	Ben Goodliffe	23	23	0	0	0	0	0	0	23	23
6	DF	(England)	Louis John	26	26	1	1	3	2	1	1	31	30
7	MF	(Netherlands)	Enzio Boldewijn	45	29	1	1	3	3	1	1	50	34
8	MF	(England)	Alistair Smith	35	27	1	1	2	2	0	0	38	30
9	FW	(Lebanon)	Omar Bugiel	35	35	1	1	3	1	0	0	39	37
10	MF	(England)	Harry Beautyman	33	22	1	0	2	2	0	0	36	24
11	MF	(England)	Will Randall	36	34	0	0	1	1	1	1	38	36
12	DF	(England)	Tobi Ogundega	0	0	0	0	0	0	0	0	0	0
13	GK	(England)	Brad House	2	1	0	0	3	3	0	0	5	4
14	FW	(England)	Craig Dundas	1	0	0	0	1	0	1	0	3	0
15	MF	(England)	Craig Eastmond	34	34	1	1	3	1	1	1	39	37
16	FW	(England)	David Ajiboye	21	19	0	0	0	0	0	0	21	19
17	DF	(England)	Matt Ridley	0	0	0	0	0	0	0	0	0	0
18	MF	(England)	Adam Lovatt	9	8	0	0	2	2	0	0	11	10
19	FW	(England)	Tope Fadahunsi	16	0	0	0	3	2	0	0	19	2
20	FW	(England)	Josh Neufville	30	23	1	1	4	2	0	0	35	26
21	MF	(Malta)	Luke Gambin	5	0	1	0	3	3	1	0	10	3
22	DF	(England)	Joe Kizzi	46	46	1	1	4	4	1	1	52	52
23	FW	(England)	Charley Kendall	7	2	0	0	3	2	1	0	11	4
24	DF	(England)	Robert Milsom	36	34	1	1	3	1	1	1	41	37
25	FW	(England)	Donovan Wilson	36	32	1	1	3	0	1	1	41	34
26	DF	(Grenada)	Aaron Pierre	2	0	0	0	1	1	0	0	3	1
27	FW	(England)	Kylian Kouassi	36	5	1	0	4	3	1	1	42	9
28	DF	(England)	Roman Charles-Cook	0	0	0	0	0	0	0	0	0	0
29	FW	(France)	Hisham Kasimu	0	0	0	0	0	0	0	0	0	0
30	GK	(Poland)	Filip Chalupniczak	0	0	0	0	0	0	0	0	0	0
31	GK	(England)	Matt Kerbey	0	0	0	0	0	0	0	0	0	0
33	FW	(England)	Lee Angol	17	9	0	0	0	0	0	0	17	9
34	GK	(England)	Lewis Ward	9	9	0	0	0	0	1	1	10	10
35	FW	(England)	Matthew Dennis	10	2	0	0	0	0	0	0	10	2
39	FW	(England)	Kwame Thomas	11	4	1	0	1	1	0	0	13	5
Total				46		1		4		1		52	

=== Goals ===
Rank	Pos.	No.	Player	EFL League Two	EFL Cup	EFL Trophy	FA Cup	Total
1	FW	9	(Lebanon) Omar Bugiel	6	0	0	0	6
1	MF	11	(England) Will Randall	6	0	0	0	6
3	MF	8	(England) Alistair Smith	5	0	0	0	5
4	DF	4	(England) Coby Rowe	3	0	1	0	4
4	FW	16	(England) David Ajiboye	4	0	0	0	4
4	FW	25	(England) Donovan Wilson	4	0	0	0	4
4	FW	27	(England) Kylian Kouassi	2	0	2	0	4
8	FW	19	(England) Tope Fadahunsi	2	0	1	0	3
8	DF	24	(England) Robert Milsom	3	0	0	0	3
8	FW	33	(England) Lee Angol	3	0	0	0	3
11	MF	10	(England) Harry Beautyman	2	0	0	0	2
11	MF	15	(England) Craig Eastmond	2	0	0	0	2
11	FW	20	(England) Josh Neufville	2	0	0	0	2
14	DF	22	(England) Joe Kizzi	1	0	0	0	1
	Own goals			1	0	0	0	1
	Total			46	0	4	0	50

=== Assists ===
Rank	Pos.	No.	Player	EFL League Two	EFL Cup	EFL Trophy	FA Cup	Total
1	FW	16	(England) David Ajiboye	4	0	0	0	4
2	MF	7	(Netherlands) Enzio Boldewijn	3	0	0	0	3
2	MF	8	(England) Alistair Smith	3	0	0	0	3
2	MF	15	(England) Craig Eastmond	3	0	0	0	3
5	GK	1	(England) Jack Rose	2	0	0	0	2
5	FW	9	(Lebanon) Omar Bugiel	2	0	0	0	2
5	MF	11	(England) Will Randall	2	0	0	0	2
5	DF	22	(England) Joe Kizzi	2	0	0	0	2
5	DF	24	(England) Robert Milsom	1	0	1	0	2
5	FW	25	(England) Donovan Wilson	2	0	0	0	2
5	FW	27	(England) Kylian Kouassi	1	0	1	0	2
12	DF	3	(England) Sam Hart	1	0	0	0	1
12	DF	5	(England) Ben Goodliffe	1	0	0	0	1
12	FW	19	(England) Tope Fadahunsi	1	0	0	0	1
	Total			25	0	2	0	27

=== Clean sheets ===
No.	Player	EFL League Two	EFL Cup	EFL Trophy	FA Cup	Total
1	(England) Jack Rose	12	0	0	0	12
13	(England) Brad House	1	0	2	0	3
34	(England) Lewis Ward	1	0	0	0	1
	Total	13 (Note: Both Rose and House featured in the home game vs Barrow so are both credited with a clean sheet.)	0	2	0	15

=== Disciplinary record ===
No.	Pos.	Name	EFL League Two			EFL Cup			EFL Trophy			FA Cup			Total		
No.	Pos.	Name	Yellow card	(yellow card) (yellow-red card)	Red card	Yellow card	(yellow card) (yellow-red card)	Red card	Yellow card	(yellow card) (yellow-red card)	Red card	Yellow card	(yellow card) (yellow-red card)	Red card	Yellow card	(yellow card) (yellow-red card)	Red card
1	GK	(England) Jack Rose	1	0	0	0	0	0	0	0	0	0	0	0	1	0	0
2	DF	(England) Jonathan Barden	2	0	0	0	0	0	1	0	0	0	0	0	3	0	0
3	DF	(England) Sam Hart	4	0	0	0	0	0	0	0	0	0	0	0	4	0	0
4	DF	(England) Coby Rowe	6	0	0	0	0	0	0	0	0	0	0	0	6	0	0
5	DF	(England) Ben Goodliffe	2	0	0	0	0	0	0	0	0	0	0	0	2	0	0
6	DF	(England) Louis John	5	0	0	0	0	0	1	0	0	0	0	0	6	0	0
7	MF	(England) Enzio Boldewijn	5	0	0	0	0	0	0	0	0	1	0	0	6	0	0
8	MF	(England) Alistair Smith	3	0	0	0	0	0	1	0	0	0	0	0	4	0	0
9	FW	(Lebanon) Omar Bugiel	13	0	1	0	0	0	2	0	0	0	0	0	15	0	1
10	MF	(England) Harry Beautyman	5	0	0	0	0	0	0	0	0	0	0	0	5	0	0
11	MF	(England) Will Randall	6	0	0	0	0	0	0	0	0	0	0	0	6	0	0
13	GK	(England) Brad House	0	0	1	0	0	0	0	0	0	0	0	0	0	0	1
15	MF	(England) Craig Eastmond	9	1	0	0	0	0	0	1	0	0	0	0	9	2	0
18	MF	(England) Adam Lovatt	0	0	0	0	0	0	1	0	0	0	0	0	1	0	0
21	MF	(Malta) Luke Gambin	0	0	0	0	0	0	0	0	0	1	0	0	1	0	0
22	DF	(England) Joe Kizzi	8	0	0	0	0	0	0	0	0	0	0	0	8	0	0
24	DF	(England) Robert Milsom	4	0	0	0	0	0	1	0	0	0	0	0	5	0	0
25	FW	(England) Donovan Wilson	0	0	1	0	0	0	0	0	0	0	0	0	0	0	1
27	FW	(England) Kylian Kouassi	0	0	0	0	0	0	0	0	0	1	0	0	1	0	0
33	FW	(England) Lee Angol	3	0	0	0	0	0	0	0	0	0	0	0	3	0	0
35	FW	(England) Matthew Dennis	1	0	0	0	0	0	0	0	0	0	0	0	1	0	0
39	FW	(England) Kwame Thomas	2	0	0	0	0	0	0	0	0	0	0	0	2	0	0
Total			79	1	3	0	0	0	7	1	0	3	0	0	89	2	3
