= Coby Rowe =

English footballer

Personal information
- Full name: Coby Jake Rowe
- Date of birth: 2 October 1995 (age 31)
- Place of birth: Waltham Forest, England
- Position: Defender

Senior career*
Years	Team	Apps	(Gls)
2014–2015	Hillingdon Borough	1	(1)
2015–2016	Wingate & Finchley	1	(0)
2016–2020	Haringey Borough	67	(13)
2020–2023	Sutton United	57	(4)
2023–2024	Aldershot Town	22	(2)
- * Club domestic league appearances and goals as of 18:11, 13 June 2024 (UTC)

Coby Jake Rowe (born 2 October 1995) is an English professional footballer who plays as a defender.

== Career ==
Rowe played for Hillingdon Borough during the 2014–15 season, before signing for Wingate & Finchley. He later played for Haringey Borough and he was injured between October 2020 and April 2021 after rupturing a kidney during a match. He signed a new contract with Sutton in June 2021. He was released by Sutton at the end of the 2022–23 season.

On 6 July 2023, following his departure from Sutton, Rowe joined Aldershot Town on a one-year deal. Having been offered a new contract at the end of the season, Rowe opted to depart the club.

== Career statistics ==
As of end of 2023–24 season

Appearances and goals by club, season and competition
Club	Season	League			FA Cup		EFL Cup		Other		Total	
Club	Season	Division	Apps	Goals	Apps	Goals	Apps	Goals	Apps	Goals	Apps	Goals
Hillingdon Borough	2014–15	Spartan South Midlands League Premier Division	1	1	0	0	—		1 (Note: Appearance in the FA Vase)	0	2	1
Wingate & Finchley	2014–15	Isthmian League Premier Division	1	0	—		—		—		1	0
Wingate & Finchley	2015–16	Isthmian League Premier Division	0	0	1	0	—		0	0	1	0
Wingate & Finchley	Total		1	0	1	0	—		0	0	2	0
Haringey Borough	2015–16	Isthmian League Division One North	11	1	—		—		—		11	1
Haringey Borough	2016–17	Isthmian League Division One North	8	1	0	0	—		1 (Note: Appearance in the Isthmian League Division One North play-offs)	0	9	1
Haringey Borough	2017–18	Isthmian League North Division	12	2	0	0	—		0	0	12	2
Haringey Borough	2018–19	Isthmian League Premier Division	22	8	2	0	—		3 (Note: One appearance in the Alan Turvey Trophy, one in the FA Trophy, one in the Isthmian League Premier Division play-offs)	0	27	8
Haringey Borough	2019–20	Isthmian League Premier Division	14	1	3	0	—		2 (Note: Appearances in the FA Trophy)	0	19	1
Haringey Borough	Total		67	13	5	0	—		6	0	78	13
Sutton United	2019–20	National League	3	0	—		—		—		3	0
Sutton United	2020–21	National League	10	0	1	0	—		0	0	11	0
Sutton United	2021–22	League Two	15	1	1	0	1	1	4 (Note: Appearances in the EFL Trophy)	0	21	2
Sutton United	2022–23	League Two	29	3	1	0	1	0	3	1	34	4
Sutton United	Total		57	4	3	0	2	1	7	1	69	6
Aldershot Town	2023–24	National League	22	2	4	0	—		2	0	28	2
Career total			148	20	13	0	2	1	16	1	179	22

== Honours ==
Sutton United

- EFL Trophy runner-up: 2021–22
