= Jack Rose (footballer) =

English footballer (born 1995)

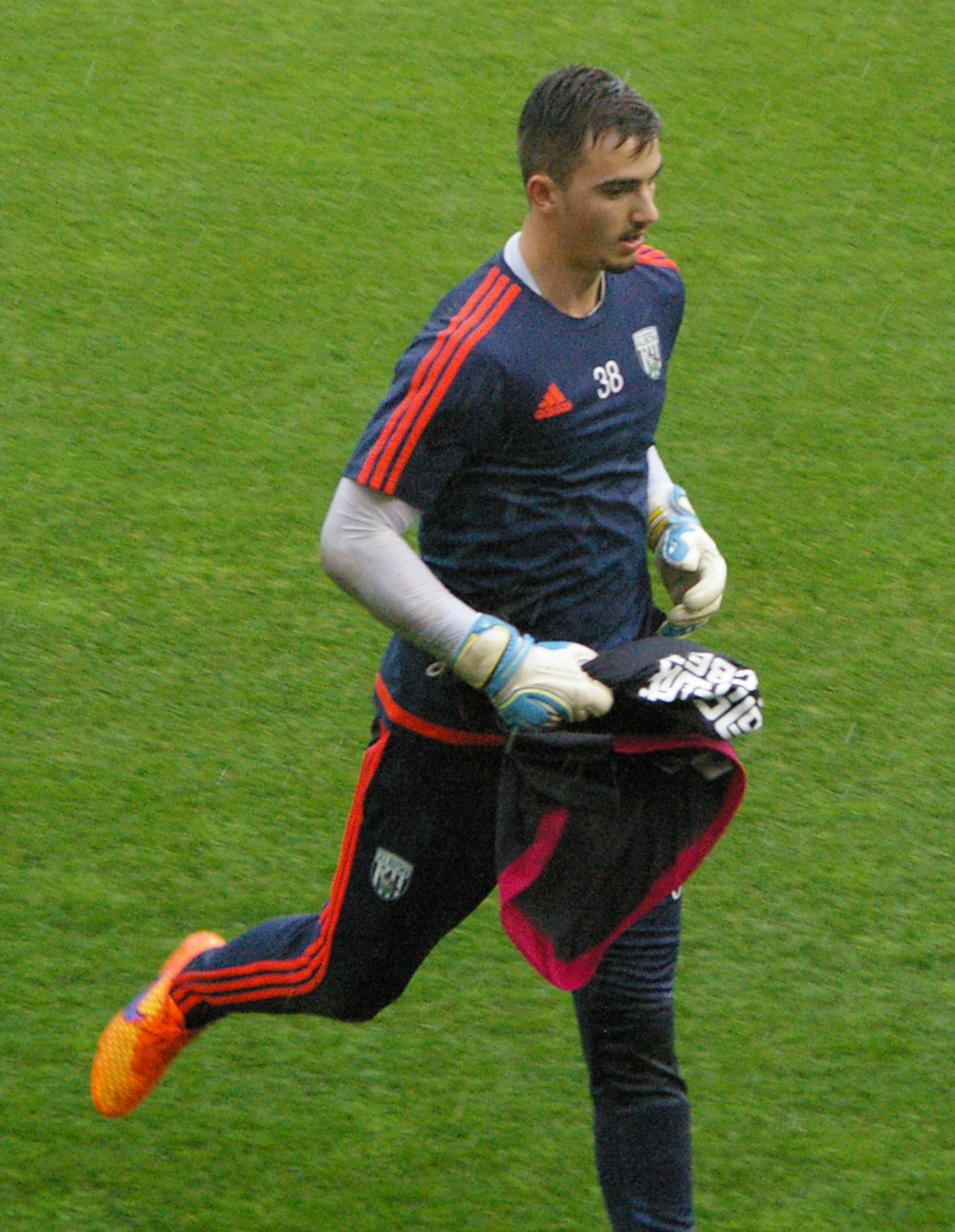
- Rose in July 2015

Personal information
- Full name: Jack Joseph Rose
- Date of birth: 31 January 1995 (age 31)
- Place of birth: Solihull, England
- Height: 6 ft 3 in (1.90 m)
- Position: Goalkeeper

Team information
- Current team: Sutton United

Youth career
- 2005–2013: West Bromwich Albion

Senior career*
Years	Team	Apps	(Gls)
2013–2017	West Bromwich Albion	0	(0)
2014–2015	→ Accrington Stanley (loan)	4	(0)
2016	→ Crawley Town (loan)	5	(0)
2017–2020	Southampton	0	(0)
2019–2020	→ Walsall (loan)	4	(0)
2020–2022	Walsall	18	(0)
2022–	Sutton United	45	(0)
2024	→ Hednesford Town (loan)	0	(0)
- * Club domestic league appearances and goals as of 11:03, 2 August 2024 (UTC)

Jack Joseph Rose (born 31 January 1995) is an English professional footballer who plays as a goalkeeper for National League club Sutton United.

== Career ==
=== West Bromwich Albion ===
Rose started his career with West Bromwich Albion, rising through the youth system and signing his first professional contract in June 2013.

In November 2014, Rose signed for Accrington Stanley on a month's loan after injuries to fellow loanees Aaron Chapman and Jesse Joronen, making his debut on 9 November in the FA Cup against Notts County, keeping a clean sheet in the 0–0 draw. He made his football league debut on 15 November against Carlisle United.

Rose signed for Crawley Town in March 2016 on loan for the rest of the season. He played five league games for the Sussex-based club.

Rose was released from West Brom on 30 June 2017.

=== Southampton ===
Rose joined Southampton in August 2017 on a one-year deal and signed a new two-year contract in June 2018.

He joined Walsall on a season long loan deal on 8 July 2019.

=== Walsall ===
In September 2020, Rose signed a permanent contract at Walsall. Rose was released at the end of the 2021–22 season.

=== Sutton United ===
On 1 July 2022, Rose joined League Two club Sutton United after his departure from Walsall.

On 1 August 2024, Rose joined Northern Premier League Division One West club Hednesford Town on a season-long loan deal.

== Career statistics ==
As of end of 2023–24 season

Appearances and goals by club, season and competition
Club	Season	League			FA Cup		League Cup		Other		Total	
Club	Season	Division	Apps	Goals	Apps	Goals	Apps	Goals	Apps	Goals	Apps	Goals
West Bromwich Albion	2014–15	Premier League	0	0	0	0	0	0	0	0	0	0
West Bromwich Albion	2015–16	Premier League	0	0	0	0	0	0	0	0	0	0
West Bromwich Albion	2016–17	Premier League	0	0	0	0	0	0	0	0	0	0
West Bromwich Albion	Total		0	0	0	0	0	0	0	0	0	0
West Bromwich Albion U23s	2016–17 EFL Trophy		—		—		—		1 (Note: Appearance(s) in EFL Trophy)	0	1	0
Accrington Stanley (loan)	2014–15	League Two	4	0	4	0	0	0	0	0	8	0
Crawley Town (loan)	2015–16	League Two	5	0	0	0	0	0	0	0	5	0
Southampton	2017–18	Premier League	0	0	0	0	0	0	0	0	0	0
Southampton	2018–19	Premier League	0	0	0	0	0	0	0	0	0	0
Southampton	2019–20	Premier League	0	0	0	0	0	0	0	0	0	0
Southampton	Total		0	0	0	0	0	0	0	0	0	0
Walsall (loan)	2019–20	League Two	4	0	1	0	0	0	1	0	6	0
Walsall	2020–21	League Two	15	0	0	0	0	0	3	0	18	0
Walsall	2021–22	League Two	3	0	0	0	0	0	4	0	7	0
Walsall	Total		22	0	1	0	0	0	8	0	31	0
Sutton United	2022–23	League Two	37	0	0	0	1	0	1	0	39	0
Sutton United	2023–24	League Two	8	0	0	0	3	0	1	0	12	0
Sutton United	2024–25	National League	0	0	0	0	—		0	0	0	0
Sutton United	Total		45	0	0	0	4	0	2	0	51	0
Career total			76	0	5	0	4	0	10	0	95	0

== Honours ==
Hednesford Town

- Northern Premier League Division One West play-offs: 2025
