= Donovan Wilson (footballer) =

English footballer (born 1997)

Personal information
- Full name: Donovan Junior Wilson
- Date of birth: 14 March 1997 (age 29)
- Place of birth: Yate, England
- Height: 1.80 m (5 ft 11 in)
- Position: Forward

Team information
- Current team: Bath City
- Number: 25

Youth career
- 200?–2004: Bradley Stoke United
- 2004–2014: Bristol Rovers

Senior career*
Years	Team	Apps	(Gls)
2014–2015	Bristol Rovers	0	(0)
2014–2015	→ Wolverhampton Wanderers (loan)	0	(0)
2015–2019	Wolverhampton Wanderers	1	(0)
2018	→ Port Vale (loan)	8	(1)
2018–2019	→ Jumilla (loan)	16	(6)
2019	→ Exeter City (loan)	10	(0)
2019–2020	Burgos	19	(1)
2020	Macclesfield Town	5	(0)
2020–2021	Bath City	9	(6)
2021	→ Sutton United (loan)	16	(7)
2021–2023	Sutton United	74	(8)
2023–2025	Grimsby Town	39	(9)
2025–2026	Dagenham & Redbridge	16	(2)
2026	→ Bath City (loan)	12	(3)
2026–	Bath City	1	(0)
- * Club domestic league appearances and goals as of 14:43, 9 August 2026 (UTC)

Donovan Junior Wilson (born 14 March 1997) is an English footballer who plays as a forward for Southern League Premier Division South club Bath City.

Wilson joined Wolverhampton Wanderers from Bristol Rovers in January 2015 following a brief loan spell. He made his first-team debut for Wolves in February 2017. He spent the second half of the 2017–18 season on loan at Port Vale. He spent the first half of the 2018–19 season on loan at Spanish club Jumilla and joined Exeter City on loan for the second half of the season. He returned to Spain to sign with Burgos in July 2019 before joining the English side Macclesfield Town in February 2020. He signed with Bath City in September 2020 and was loaned out to Sutton United in March 2021, and joined the club permanently after helping Sutton to win the National League title at the end of the 2020–21 season. He played on the losing side in the 2022 EFL Trophy final. He signed with Grimsby Town in June 2023, where he remained for two seasons. He returned to non-League football with Dagenham & Redbridge in June 2025 and rejoined Bath City the following year after a period on loan.

== Career ==
=== Bristol Rovers ===
Wilson began his career at Bristol Rovers, signing a one-year deal at 17 in May 2014; he had spent ten years at the club's academy after signing from Bradley Stoke United at the age of seven. He made the bench at the Memorial Stadium during the 2014–15 Conference Premier promotion winning season, but did not make it onto the pitch for the "Pirates". Manager Darrell Clarke reportedly had planned to give him his debut in one match before realising he had already made his three allotted substitutions.

=== Wolverhampton Wanderers ===
Wilson initially joined Wolverhampton Wanderers in a loan deal in November 2014, before a permanent transfer for an undisclosed fee was finalised once the January transfer window opened. He played three EFL Trophy matches for the under-23 team in the 2016–17 season, and scored in the 4–0 win over Accrington Stanley at the Crown Ground on 8 November. He signed a new 18-month contract in December 2016. He made his first-team debut for Wolves in the FA Cup on 18 February 2017, coming on as a 76th-minute substitute for Andreas Weimann in a 2–0 defeat to Chelsea at Molineux. Manager Paul Lambert said that he had put Wilson on the bench because of his pace, though he remained behind fellow youngsters Bright Enobakhare, Connor Ronan and Morgan Gibbs-White in the first-team pecking order. Wilson made his EFL Championship debut on 14 April, coming on as a 76th-minute substitute for Jón Daði Böðvarsson in a 2–0 home defeat to Brighton & Hove Albion.

He scored his first senior goal on 23 August 2017, in a 2–0 victory over Premier League club Southampton at St Mary's in the second round of the EFL Cup. He signed a new three-year contract two months later. On 11 January 2018, he joined EFL League Two side Port Vale on loan until the end of the 2017–18 season. The "Valiants" had previously attempted to sign Wilson on loan the previous summer. Manager Neil Aspin said there had been competition from others clubs to sign the youngster. On 17 March, Wilson scored his first goal in the English Football League in a 2–2 draw with Stevenage at Vale Park.

On 31 August 2018, Wilson joined Segunda División B club Jumilla on loan, along with eight Wolves teammates. He scored six goals in 16 league games for the club and was praised by manager Leonel Pontes. Wilson said that "over here I've been playing game after game, and I'm pleased that I'm getting more minutes into my legs, getting me fitter, stronger, so it's been a really good experience." On 31 January 2019, he returned to England and joined League Two side Exeter City on loan until the end of the 2018–19 season, replacing departing loanee striker Tristan Abrahams. He made three starts and seven substitute appearances for Matt Taylor's "Grecians", failing to score a goal. He did however, enjoy the passing style of play and close proximity to his home in Bristol.

=== Burgos ===
On 22 July 2019, Wilson returned to Spain to sign a permanent deal with Segunda División B side Burgos. He scored one goal in seven starts and 12 substitute appearances in the first half of the 2019–20 season.

=== Macclesfield Town ===
Wilson returned to England to sign for League Two side Macclesfield Town on 7 February 2020. He made five appearances for the "Silkmen", before the 2019–20 season was curtailed due to the COVID-19 pandemic in England; he was not retained by Mark Kennedy and departed Moss Rose in the summer.

=== Bath City ===
On 12 September 2020, Wilson joined National League South side Bath City. He scored on his league debut for the "Romans", in a 2–1 defeat at Slough Town on 31 October. The National League South was declared null and void on 18 February.

=== Sutton United ===
On 3 March 2021, Wilson joined National League side Sutton United on loan for the remainder of the 2020–21 season. He made his debut three days later, coming on as a substitute in the 80' minute of a 0–0 draw with Wrexham as Sutton missed the opportunity to move to the top of the league. A week later, Wilson opened his account for the club when he scored the only goal of the game as Sutton moved four points clear of second place with a 1–0 win over King's Lynn Town. He scored seven goals from 16 appearances, helping Sutton to secure promotion into the Football League as champions of the National League. On 11 June 2021, he made his move to Sutton a permanent deal. He ended the 2021–22 season with seven goals in 48 appearances for Matt Gray's "U's. This tally included goals in wins over AFC Wimbledon and Sutton United at Gander Green Lane that helped Sutton reach the final at Wembley Stadium. He opened the scoring in the final, however, Rotherham United came from behind to win the match 4–2 after extra-time. On 24 September 2022, Wilson was sent off following an off the ball incident involving Theo Vassell during a 2–1 home defeat to Salford City. He scored four goals in forty games in the 2022–23 campaign, before being released upon the expiry of his contract.

=== Grimsby Town ===
On 9 June 2023, Wilson signed a two-year deal with League Two side Grimsby Town after having been tracked by manager Paul Hurst since his time at Wolves. He picked up an injury in pre-season and was protected by Hurst in the first half of the 2023–24 season. He ended the campaign with eight goals in 30 appearances. He struggled with persistent injuries under Hurst's successor, David Artell, who expressed frustration with Wilson's ongoing issues and only played him on two occasions in the final two-thirds of the 2024–25 season before releasing him upon the expiry of his contract.

=== Later career ===
On 17 June 2025, Wilson signed for National League South side Dagenham & Redbridge on a one-year deal; manager Lee Bradbury commented that "he's in his prime and he'll bring a lot of experience and nous to the front line and the team". In February 2026, Wilson returned to divisional rivals Bath City on loan for the remainder of the 2025–26 season. He scored a brace in a 4–2 win over Chesham United. Bath City were relegated at the end of the campaign. He joined Bath City (now in the Southern League Premier Division South) on a permanent deal on 17 July, signing a two-year contract.

== Personal life ==
Wilson was born in England and is of Jamaican descent.

== Style of play ==
Wilson is a pacey forward.

== Career statistics ==
As of match played 8 August 2026

Appearances and goals by club, season and competition
Club	Season	League			National cup (Note: Includes FA Cup, Copa del Rey)		League cup (Note: Includes EFL Cup)		Other		Total	
Club	Season	Division	Apps	Goals	Apps	Goals	Apps	Goals	Apps	Goals	Apps	Goals
Bristol Rovers	2014–15	Conference Premier	0	0	0	0	—		0	0	0	0
Wolverhampton Wanderers	2014–15	Championship	0	0	0	0	0	0	—		0	0
Wolverhampton Wanderers	2015–16	Championship	0	0	0	0	0	0	—		0	0
Wolverhampton Wanderers	2016–17	Championship	1	0	1	0	0	0	—		2	0
Wolverhampton Wanderers	2017–18	Championship	0	0	0	0	2	1	—		2	1
Wolverhampton Wanderers	2018–19	Premier League	0	0	0	0	0	0	—		0	0
Wolverhampton Wanderers	2019–20	Premier League	0	0	0	0	0	0	0	0	0	0
Wolverhampton Wanderers	Total		1	0	1	0	2	1	0	0	4	1
Wolverhampton Wanderers U23	2016–17	—			—		—		3 (Note: Appearance(s) in the EFL Trophy)	1	3	1
Port Vale (loan)	2017–18	League Two	8	1	—		—		—		8	1
Jumilla (loan)	2018–19	Segunda División B – Group 4	16	6	0	0	0	0	0	0	16	6
Exeter City (loan)	2018–19	League Two	10	0	—		—		—		10	0
Burgos (loan)	2019–20	Segunda División B – Group 2	19	1	0	0	0	0	0	0	19	1
Macclesfield Town	2019–20	League Two	5	0	0	0	0	0	0	0	5	0
Bath City	2020–21	National League South	9	6	1	0	—		0	0	10	6
Sutton United (loan)	2020–21	National League	16	7	—		—		0	0	16	7
Sutton United	2021–22	League Two	38	4	2	0	1	1	7	3	48	8
Sutton United	2022–23	League Two	36	4	1	0	1	0	2	0	40	4
Sutton United	Total		90	15	3	0	2	1	9	3	104	19
Grimsby Town	2023–24	League Two	27	8	3	0	0	0	0	0	30	8
Grimsby Town	2024–25	League Two	12	1	0	0	2	1	1	0	15	2
Grimsby Town	Total		39	9	3	0	2	1	1	0	45	10
Dagenham & Redbridge	2025–26	National League South	16	2	3	1	—		2 (Note: Appearances in FA Trophy)	0	21	3
Bath City (loan)	2025–26	National League South	12	3	—		—		—		12	3
Bath City	2026–27	Southern League; Premier Division South	1	0	0	0	—		0	0	1	0
Career total			226	43	11	1	6	3	15	4	258	51

== Honours ==
Sutton United

- National League: 2020–21
- EFL Trophy runner-up: 2021–22
