= 2026–27 Burton Albion F.C. season =

77th season in existence of Burton Albion FC

Burton Albion
2026–27 season
- Owner: Nordic Football Group
- Chairman: Wouter Gudde (Interim)
- Manager: Gary Bowyer
- Stadium: Pirelli Stadium

The 2026–27 season is the 77th season in the history of Burton Albion Football Club and their ninth consecutive season being in League One. In addition to the domestic league, the club would also participate in the FA Cup, the EFL Cup, and the EFL Trophy.

== Transfers and contracts ==
=== In ===
Date	Pos.	Player	From	Fee	Ref.
29 June 2026	CB	(Jamaica) Curtis Tilt	(England) Bradford City	Undisclosed	
4 July 2026	CF	(England) Matthew Dennis	(England) Notts County	Undisclosed	
18 July 2026	CF	(Republic of Ireland) Gbemi Arubi	(Republic of Ireland) Dundalk	Undisclosed	
22 July 2026	CB	(England) Harvey Araujo	(England) Fulham	Undisclosed	
30 August 2026	CB	(Wales) Joe Lewis	(England) AFC Wimbledon	Free	
1 September 2026	RW	(England) Caylan Vickers	(England) Brighton & Hove Albion	Undisclosed	

=== Loaned in ===
Date	Pos.	Player	From	Loaned until	Ref.
15 July 2026	GK	(Jamaica) Corey Addai	(England) Stockport County	End of Season	
14 August 2026	CM	(England) Will Collar	(England) Milton Keynes Dons	End of Season	
18 August 2026	LB	(England) Emeka Adiele	(Netherlands) Utrecht	End of Season	
1 September 2026	CF	(Republic of Ireland) Mark O'Mahony	(England) Brighton & Hove Albion	End of Season	
2 September 2026	LW	(Australia) Raphael Borges Rodrigues	(England) Coventry City	End of Season	

=== Loaned out ===
Date	Pos.	Player	To	Loaned until	Ref.
7 September 2026	CM	(England) Jack Willow	(England) Redditch United	5 October 2026	
10 September 2026	CF	(England) Millar Matthews-Lewis	(England) AFC Fylde	8 December 2026	
29 September 2026	GK	(Wales) Lucas Joubert	(England) Kidsgrove Athletic	29 October 2026	

=== Out ===
Date	Pos.	Player	To	Fee	Ref.
15 June 2026 (Note: The transfer was announced on 2 June, and would become official on June 15 once the transfer window opened.)	CF	(England) Jake Beesley	(England) Bradford City	Undisclosed	
30 June 2026	CB	(England) Udoka Godwin-Malife	(England) Reading	Undisclosed	
7 July 2026 (Note: The transfer was announced on 15 June, and would become official on July 7 once the Allsvenskan transfer window opened.)	CF	(Sweden) Julian Larsson	(Sweden) Helsingborg	Undisclosed	
13 July 2026	CF	(Sweden) Jack Cooper-Love	(Netherlands) Emmen	Free transfer	
20 July 2026	LB	(England) Dylan Williams	(Scotland) Motherwell	Undisclosed	
25 July 2026	CB	(Guyana) Terence Vancooten	(England) Stevenage	Undisclosed	
1 September 2026	RW	(Saint Kitts and Nevis) Tyrese Shade	(England) Portsmouth	£1,800,000 (Note: A potential further £400,000 in add-ons.)	

=== Released / Out of Contract ===
Date	Pos.	Player	Subsequent club	Joined date	Ref.
30 June 2026	GK	(Ghana) Jordan Amissah	(Scotland) Dundee United	1 July 2026	
30 June 2026	CB	(England) Alex Hartridge	(England) Plymouth Argyle	1 July 2026	
30 June 2026	CB	(England) Jasper Moon	(England) Port Vale	1 July 2026	
30 June 2026	CF	(Portugal) Fábio Tavares	(England) Rotherham United	1 July 2026	
30 June 2026	CDM	(Albania) Geraldo Bajrami	(Albania) KF Teuta	2 July 2026	
30 June 2026	CB	(Scotland) Alex Bannon	(Northern Ireland) Cliftonville	17 July 2026	
30 June 2026	CF	(England) Jack Newall	(England) Stoke City	28 July 2026	
30 June 2026	LB	(Wales) Josh Taroni	(England) Worcester City	5 August 2026	
30 June 2026	CM	(Scotland) James Jones	(England) Crewe Alexandra	4 November 2026	
13 July 2026	RB	(United States) Nick Akoto	(England) Eastleigh	13 July 2026	
2 September 2026	LW	(Lithuania) Tomas Kalinauskas	(Israel) Maccabi Bnei Reineh	19 October 2026	

=== New Contract ===
Date	Pos.	Player	Contract expiry	Ref.
8 May 2026	LB	(Scotland) Jack Armer	30 June 2027	
8 May 2026	CDM	(England) George Evans	30 June 2027	
1 July 2026 (Note: The contract was announced on 10 June, and would come into effect on July 1.)	CF	(England) Zac Scutt	30 June 2027 (Note: First professional contract) (Note: Includes an option of an additional year)	
12 October 2026	CB	(England) Finn Delap	30 June 2029	
23 October 2026	GK	(Poland) Kamil Dudek	30 June 2029	

== Pre-season and friendlies ==
On 21 May, The Brewers announced their first pre-season fixture against Solihull Moors. Eleven days later, a second opposition was confirmed in Alfreton Town. For the annual Bass Charity Vase, Derby County was confirmed as this season's opponents. On 12 June, a home friendly against Leicester City was added. Four days later, a third home friendly was confirmed against Birmingham City.

Win Draw Loss Fixtures

11 July 2026 Friendly	Alfreton Town	0–0	Burton Albion	Alfreton
14:00 BST		Report		Stadium: Solana Stadium; Attendance: 408

18 July 2026 Friendly	Burton Albion	0–3	Leicester City	Burton upon Trent
13:00 BST	Armer (yellow card) 3'	Report	Otchere 45+3'; Alves 65'; Opoku 80'	Stadium: Pirelli Stadium

22 July 2026 Friendly	Burton Albion	0–1	Birmingham City	Burton upon Trent
19:30 BST		Report	Priske 29'	Stadium: Pirelli Stadium; Attendance: 2,282

28 July 2026 Friendly	Solihull Moors	1–1	Burton Albion	Solihull
19:00 BST	Worman 36'	Report	Lofthouse 8'	Stadium: Damson Park

1 August 2026 Bass Charity Vase	Burton Albion	1–0	Derby County	Burton upon Trent
15:00 BST	Shade 11' (pen.)	Report		Stadium: Pirelli Stadium

== Competitions ==
=== League One ===
==== League table ====
Pos	Team	Pld	W	D	L	GF	GA	GD	Pts
14	Stevenage	13	5	4	4	18	13	+5	19
15	Wycombe Wanderers	14	4	6	4	24	27	−3	18
16	Burton Albion	16	4	5	7	21	29	−8	17
17	Wigan Athletic	16	5	2	9	15	24	−9	17
18	AFC Wimbledon	15	4	4	7	11	25	−14	16

Updated to match(es) played on 21 November 2026. Source: EFL Official Website
Rules for classification: 1) Points; 2) Goal difference; 3) Number of goals scored; 4) Head-to-head results; 5) Wins; 6) Away goals; 7) Penalty points (sec 9.5); 8) 12-point sending off offences

==== Results summary ====
Overall								Home						Away					
Pld	W	D	L	GF	GA	GD	Pts	W	D	L	GF	GA	GD	W	D	L	GF	GA	GD
15	4	5	6	20	27	−7	17	2	4	1	12	10	+2	2	1	5	8	17	−9

Last updated: 14 November 2026.
Source: Soccerway

==== Results by round ====
Round	1	2	3	4	5	6	7	8	9	10	11	12	13	14	15	16	17	18	19	20	21	22	23	24
Ground	H	A	A	H	H	A	H	A	H	A	A	H	H	A	A	H	A	H	H	A	H	A	A	H
Result	D	W	L	W	D	L	D	W	L	L	D	D	W	L	L									
Position	12	7	11	4	5	11	12	7	8	10	10	14	12	15	15									
Points	1	4	4	7	8	8	9	12	12	12	13	14	17	17	17									

Source: Soccerway
A = Away; H = Home; W = Win; D = Draw; L = Loss; P = Postponed

==== Matches ====
On 25 June, the League One fixtures were revealed.

Win Draw Loss Fixtures

15 August 2026 1	Burton Albion	1–1	Stevenage	Burton upon Trent
15:00 BST	Armer 74'	Report	Sanderson 90+1'	Stadium: Pirelli Stadium; Attendance: 3,001; Referee: Martin Coy

22 August 2026 2	Leicester City	1–2	Burton Albion	Leicester
15:00 BST	Skipp (red card) 29'; Burns 42'; De Cordova-Reid (yellow card) 83'	Report	Dennis 5'; Tilt (yellow card) 17'; Chauke 25'; Krubally (yellow card) 63'; Lofthouse (yellow card) 74'	Stadium: King Power Stadium; Attendance: 27,744; Referee: Ben Toner

29 August 2026 3	Notts County	2–1	Burton Albion	Nottingham
15:00 BST	Finneran (yellow card) 36'; Smyth 78', 84' (pen.)	Report	Delap 22'; Tilt (yellow card) 34' (yellow-red card) 83'; Armer (yellow card) 51'; Krubally (yellow card) 52'; Evans (yellow card) 65'	Stadium: Meadow Lane; Attendance: 11,701 (1,138 away); Referee: Kirsty Dowle

2 September 2026 4	Burton Albion	4–1	AFC Wimbledon	Burton upon Trent
19:45 BST	Evans 28'; Smith 34' (o.g.); Webster 46'; Vickers 76'; Armer (yellow card) 83'	Report	Stockley 18'; Yiadom (yellow card) 72'	Stadium: Pirelli Stadium; Attendance: 2,733; Referee: Declan Brown
Note: Fixture was initially scheduled for 1 September, but was pushed back 24 hours to accommodate EFL Cup fixture changes.

5 September 2026 5	Burton Albion	2–2	Cambridge United	Burton upon Trent
15:00 BST	Delap 19'; Krubally (yellow card) 31'; Tilt 90'	Report	Ball (yellow card) 16'; Ahadme 43', 65'; Perry (yellow card) 90+2'	Stadium: Pirelli Stadium; Referee: Elliot Swallow

12 September 2026 6	Oxford United	3–0	Burton Albion	Littlemore
15:00 BST	McDonnell (yellow card) 38'; Dembélé 76'; Sibley 90'; O'Donkor 90+4'		Lewis (yellow card) 23'	Stadium: The Kassam Stadium; Referee: William Davis

19 September 2026 7	Burton Albion	2–2	Mansfield Town	Burton upon Trent
12:30 BST	Oshilaja 16' (o.g.); Armer 28'; Collar (yellow card) 39'		Hewitt (yellow card) 21'; Sweeney (yellow card) 23'; Smith 40', (yellow card) 59'; Reed (yellow card) 49'; Akins 70'; Blake-Tracy (yellow card) 90+3'	Stadium: Pirelli Stadium; Referee: Oliver Mackey
Note: Fixture was initially scheduled for a 15:00 kick-off, but was brought forward for live Sky Sports.

26 September 2026 8	Plymouth Argyle	0–1	Burton Albion	Plymouth
15:00 BST	Evans (yellow card) 56'; Curtis (yellow card) 60'; Ross (yellow card) 86'	Report	Tilt (yellow card) 23'; Dennis (yellow card) 65'; Armer 70'; Krubally (yellow card) 84'	Stadium: Home Park; Attendance: 15,372 (159 away); Referee: Simon Mather

3 October 2026 9	Burton Albion	1–3	Huddersfield Town	Burton upon Trent
15:00 BST	Delap 33', (yellow card) 58'	Report	Wallace (yellow card) 6'; Sanches Fernandes 22'; Mumba 39'; Fletcher 69'	Stadium: Pirelli Stadium; Attendance: 4,992; Referee: Neil Hair

10 October 2026 10	Doncaster Rovers	1–0	Burton Albion	Doncaster
15:00 BST	Bailey (yellow card) 41'; Ayinde 45+2'; Gotts (yellow card) 70'; Adelakun (yellow card) 90'	Report	Dennis (yellow card) 39'; Araujo (yellow card) 84'	Stadium: Club Doncaster Sports Village; Attendance: 7,400 (413 away); Referee: Harrison Blair

17 October 2026 11	Peterborough United	2–2	Burton Albion	Peterborough
12:30 BST	Edwards 2'; Johnston (yellow card) 77'; Khela (yellow card) 79'; Garbett 90+6'	Report	Webster 30'; Borges Rodrigues (yellow card) 78'; Arubi 89'	Stadium: Weston Homes Stadium; Attendance: 7,584 (224 away); Referee: Craig Hicks
Note: Fixture was initially scheduled for a 15:00 kick-off, but was brought forward for live Sky Sports broadcasting.

20 October 2026 12	Burton Albion	0–0	Bradford City	Burton upon Trent
19:45 BST	Rodrigues (yellow card) 44'; Tilt (yellow card) 51'; Sibbick (yellow card) 81'; Krubally (yellow card) 88'	Report	Sarcevic (yellow card) 52'; Touray (yellow card) 90+4'	Stadium: Pirelli Stadium; Attendance: 3,574; Referee: Sunny Singh Gill

24 October 2026 13	Burton Albion	2–1	Leyton Orient	Burton upon Trent
15:00 BST	O'Mahony (yellow card) 32'; Chauke 56'; Collar 86'	Report	Gilbert 34'	Stadium: Pirelli Stadium; Attendance: 3,223; Referee: Richard Eley

31 October 2026 14	Wycombe Wanderers	2–0	Burton Albion	High Wycombe
15:00 GMT	Harvie (yellow card) 12'; Wareham 21'; Mothersille (yellow card) 38'; Woodrow 54'	Report	Sibbick (yellow card) 38'	Stadium: Adams Park; Referee: Thomas Parsons

14 November 2026 15	Milton Keynes Dons	6–2	Burton Albion	Denbigh
15:00 GMT	Crowley 9'; Nombe 39', 67'; Sanders 51'; Araujo 56' (o.g.); Wiles 78'	Report	Adiele 54'; Adom 81'; Araujo (yellow card) 83'	Stadium: Stadium MK; Attendance: 7,550 (504 away); Referee: Edward Duckworth

21 November 2026 16	Burton Albion	1–2	Luton Town	Burton upon Trent
15:00 GMT	Adiele 20'; Krubally (yellow card) 56'; Sraha (yellow card) 90+7'	Report	Wells 31' (pen.), 76', (yellow card) 78'	Stadium: Pirelli Stadium; Attendance: 4,222; Referee: Dean Whitestone

28 November 2026 17	Bromley	v	Burton Albion	Bromley
15:00 GMT				Stadium: Copperjax Community Stadium

1 December 2026 18	Burton Albion	v	Wigan Athletic	Burton upon Trent
19:45 GMT				Stadium: Pirelli Stadium

12 December 2026 19	Burton Albion	v	Reading	Burton upon Trent
12:30 GMT				Stadium: Pirelli Stadium
Note: Fixture was initially scheduled for a 15:00 kick-off, but was brought forward for live Sky Sports broadcasting.

19 December 2026 20	Blackpool	v	Burton Albion	Blackpool
15:00 GMT				Stadium: Bloomfield Road

26 December 2026 21	Burton Albion	v	Sheffield Wednesday	Burton upon Trent
15:00 GMT				Stadium: Pirelli Stadium

29 December 2026 22	Barnsley	v	Burton Albion	Barnsley
19:45 GMT				Stadium: Oakwell

2 January 2027 23	Stockport County	v	Burton Albion	Edgeley
15:00 GMT				Stadium: Edgeley Park
Note: Fixture was initially scheduled for 1 January, but was rescheduled after both clubs were in agreement to push back 24 hours.

8 January 2027 24	Burton Albion	v	Blackpool	Burton upon Trent
20:00 GMT				Stadium: Pirelli Stadium
Note: Fixture was initially scheduled for 9 January, but was brought forward to the night before for live Sky Sports broadcasting.

=== FA Cup ===
Burton were drawn at home to AFC Rushden & Diamonds in the first round and away to Shrewsbury Town in the second round.

Win Draw Loss Fixtures

7 November 2026 First round	Burton Albion	4–0	AFC Rushden & Diamonds	Burton upon Trent
15:00 GMT	O'Mahony 23', (yellow card) 42'; Borges Rodrigues 35', (yellow card) 55'; Collar (yellow card) 51'; Webster 75'; Scutt 90+5'	Report	Prickett-Reed (yellow card) 45+2'; Nketia (yellow card) 59'; Daldy (yellow card) 80'	Stadium: Pirelli Stadium; Attendance: 4,086; Referee: Gareth Thomas

5 December 2026 Second round	Shrewsbury Town	v	Burton Albion	Shrewsbury
15:00 GMT				Stadium: Croud Meadow

=== EFL Cup ===
Burton were drawn at home to Blackburn Rovers in the first round.

Win Draw Loss Fixtures

8 August 2026 First round	Burton Albion	1–2	Blackburn Rovers	Burton upon Trent
15:00 BST	Scutt 14'; Delap (yellow card) 28'; Dennis (yellow card) 56'	Report	Cantwell (yellow card) 32'; Guðjohnsen 81'; Fevrier 88'	Stadium: Pirelli Stadium; Attendance: 2,839; Referee: Andrew Humphries

=== EFL Trophy ===
==== Group stage ====
Burton were drawn against Grimsby Town, Notts County and Nottingham Forest U21 into Northern Group F.

Pos	Div	Team	Pld	W	PW	PL	L	GF	GA	GD	Pts	Qualification
1	L1	Notts County	3	3	0	0	0	10	2	+8	9	Advance to Round 2
2	ACA	Nottingham Forest U21	3	1	1	0	1	5	6	−1	5	Advance to Round 2
3	L1	Burton Albion	3	0	1	1	1	1	4	−3	3	
4	L2	Grimsby Town	3	0	0	1	2	1	5	−4	1	

Source: EFL

22 September 2026 Group stage	Burton Albion	1–1 (3–4 p)	Nottingham Forest U21	Burton upon Trent
19:00 BST	Adiele 25'	Report	Clarke 54'	Stadium: Pirelli Stadium; Attendance: 595; Referee: Richard Aspinall
	Penalties
	Scutt (penalty scored); Adom (penalty scored); Adiele (penalty scored); Krubally (penalty missed); Henry (penalty missed)		Smith (penalty scored); Whitehall (penalty scored); Nolan (penalty scored); Newton (penalty scored)

6 October 2026 Group stage	Grimsby Town	0–0 (2–4 p)	Burton Albion	Cleethorpes
19:00 BST	Cartwright (yellow card) 12'; Kacurri (yellow card) 59'	Report	Adiele (yellow card) 82'	Stadium: Blundell Park; Attendance: 539 (30 away); Referee: Aaron Bannister
	Penalties
	Green (penalty missed); Vernam (penalty scored); Finch (penalty missed); Foulkes (penalty scored)		Sraha (penalty scored); Adiele (penalty scored); Scutt (penalty scored); Jones (penalty scored)

10 November 2026 Group stage	Burton Albion	0–3	Notts County	Burton upon Trent
19:00 GMT		Report	Campbell 20'; Sanders (yellow card) 36', (goal) 75'; Smyth 71'	Stadium: Pirelli Stadium; Attendance: 1,016; Referee: Isaac Searle

== Statistics ==
=== Appearances and goals ===
As of match played 14 November 2026

Players with no appearances are not included on the list; italics indicate loaned in player

No.	Pos	Nat	Player	Total		League One		FA Cup		EFL Cup		EFL Trophy	
No.	Pos	Nat	Player	Apps	Goals	Apps	Goals	Apps	Goals	Apps	Goals	Apps	Goals
3	DF	(Scotland) SCO	Jack Armer	12	3	11+0	3	0+0	0	1+0	0	0+0	0
4	MF	(South Africa) RSA	Kegs Chauke	17	2	15+0	2	1+0	0	1+0	0	0+0	0
6	DF	(Uganda) UGA	Toby Sibbick	14	0	11+1	0	1+0	0	1+0	0	0+0	0
8	MF	(England) ENG	Charlie Webster	16	3	15+0	2	1+0	1	0+0	0	0+0	0
9	FW	(Republic of Ireland) IRL	Gbemi Arubi	6	1	2+3	1	0+1	0	0+0	0	0+0	0
10	FW	(Republic of Ireland) IRL	Mark O'Mahony	5	1	3+1	0	1+0	1	0+0	0	0+0	0
12	MF	(England) ENG	George Evans	10	1	9+0	1	0+0	0	1+0	0	0+0	0
14	MF	(England) ENG	Will Collar	16	1	7+6	1	1+0	0	0+0	0	2+0	0
15	DF	(England) ENG	Kyran Lofthouse	8	0	7+0	0	0+0	0	1+0	0	0+0	0
16	DF	(Jamaica) JAM	Curtis Tilt	16	1	14+0	1	1+0	0	1+0	0	0+0	0
17	MF	(Australia) AUS	Raphael Borges Rodrigues	13	1	11+0	0	1+0	1	0+0	0	1+0	0
18	FW	(England) ENG	Caylan Vickers	11	1	10+0	1	0+0	0	0+0	0	1+0	0
19	FW	(England) ENG	Matthew Dennis	13	1	4+5	1	1+0	0	1+0	0	2+0	0
20	DF	(England) ENG	Jason Sraha	9	0	3+2	0	0+1	0	0+0	0	3+0	0
23	DF	(England) ENG	Emeka Adiele	10	2	1+5	1	1+0	0	0+0	0	3+0	1
24	DF	(England) ENG	Harvey Araujo	13	0	5+5	0	0+1	0	0+0	0	1+1	0
26	DF	(England) ENG	Finn Delap	11	3	9+0	3	0+0	0	1+0	0	1+0	0
27	GK	(Poland) POL	Kamil Dudek	2	0	0+0	0	0+0	0	0+0	0	2+0	0
28	MF	(England) ENG	Millar Matthews-Lewis	1	0	0+0	0	0+0	0	0+1	0	0+0	0
29	FW	(England) ENG	Kain Adom	14	1	3+7	1	0+1	0	0+0	0	2+1	0
31	DF	(Wales) WAL	Joe Lewis	6	0	1+3	0	1+0	0	0+0	0	1+0	0
34	GK	(Jamaica) JAM	Corey Addai	18	0	15+0	0	1+0	0	1+0	0	1+0	0
40	FW	(England) ENG	Zac Scutt	11	2	1+5	0	0+1	1	1+0	1	3+0	0
41	MF	(Spain) ESP	Sulyman Krubally	17	0	8+5	0	0+0	0	1+0	0	3+0	0
50	MF	(England) ENG	Jack Willow	3	0	0+0	0	0+0	0	0+1	0	2+0	0
52	DF	(England) ENG	Miles Henry	5	0	0+1	0	0+0	0	0+1	0	1+2	0
53	MF	(England) ENG	Caden Gilbert	2	0	0+0	0	0+0	0	0+0	0	1+1	0
54	FW	(England) ENG	Robbie Meakin	2	0	0+0	0	0+0	0	0+0	0	0+2	0
55	MF	(England) ENG	Kairo Piper	2	0	0+0	0	0+0	0	0+0	0	1+1	0
56	DF	(England) ENG	William Earley	4	0	0+1	0	0+0	0	0+0	0	2+1	0
57	FW	(England) ENG	Will Hetheridge	1	0	0+0	0	0+0	0	0+0	0	0+1	0
59	DF	(England) ENG	Daniel Jones	1	0	0+0	0	0+0	0	0+0	0	0+1	0
60	MF	(England) ENG	Samuel Oyemade	1	0	0+1	0	0+0	0	0+0	0	0+0	0
Players who featured but departed the club permanently during the season:
10	FW	(Saint Kitts and Nevis) SKN	Tyrese Shade	1	0	0+1	0	0	0	0	0	0	0

== Awards ==
=== Player awards ===
==== EFL League One Goal of the Month ====
Month	Player	Opposition	Result	Ref.
October	(Republic of Ireland) Gbemi Arubi	v. Peterborough United	Nominated	

=== Manager awards ===
==== EFL League One Manager of the Month ====
Month	Manager	Result	Ref.
September	(England) Gary Bowyer	Nominated	
