= 2026–27 Roda JC Kerkrade season =

Roda JC Kerkrade
2026–27 season
- Stadium: Parkstad Limburg Stadion
- Eerste Divisie: Pre-season
- KNVB Cup: Pre-season

The 2026–27 season is the 65th season in the history of Roda Juliana Combinatie Kerkrade and their ninth consecutive season in the Eerste Divisie, the Dutch second division. They will also compete in the KNVB Cup.

== Transfers ==
=== In ===
Pos.	Player	Transferred to	Fee	Date	Source
DF	(Netherlands) Bram Marsman	(Netherlands) SC Cambuur	Undisclosed	1 July 2026	
DF	(Netherlands) Xander van den Berg	(Netherlands) Quick Boys		1 July 2026	

=== Out ===
Pos.	Player	Transferred to	Fee	Date	Source
FW	(Sweden) Jack Cooper-Love	(England) Burton Albion	Loan return	30 June 2026	
MF	(Lithuania) Tomas Kalinauskas	(England) Burton Albion	Loan return	30 June 2026	
GK	(Germany) Ben Zich	(Germany) Fortuna Düsseldorf	Loan return	30 June 2026	
MF	(Netherlands) Michael Breij	(Netherlands) FC Emmen	End of contract	1 July 2026	
MF	(Sweden) Rasmus Wiedesheim-Paul	(Sweden) Örebro SK	Free	7 July 2026	

== Pre-season and friendlies ==
30 June 2026 Friendly	V.V. Chevremont (Netherlands)	0–10	(Netherlands) Roda JC
19:00

3 July 2026 Friendly	Vitesse (Netherlands)	1–1	(Netherlands) Roda JC
14:00	45'		15'

1 August 2026 Friendly	Roda JC (Netherlands)	2–4	(Germany) Alemannia Aachen	Kerkrade
18:00				Stadium: Parkstad Limburg Stadium

== Competitions ==
=== Overall record ===
Competition	Starting round	Record							
Competition	Starting round	Pld	W	D	L	GF	GA	GD	Win %
Eerste Divisie	Matchday 1	0	0	0	0	0	0	+0	—
KNVB Cup		0	0	0	0	0	0	+0	—
Total		0	0	0	0	0	0	+0	—

Source: Competitions

=== Eerste Divisie ===
7 August 2026 1	Emmen	v	Roda JC
20:00
