= 2024–25 Burton Albion F.C. season =

75th season in existence of Burton Albion FC

Burton Albion
2024–25 season
- Owner: Nordic Football Group
- Chairman: Ole Jakob Strandhagen
- Head Coach: Mark Robinson (until 23 October); Tom Hounsell (interim basis); Gary Bowyer (from 17 December)
- Stadium: Pirelli Stadium
- League One: 20th
- FA Cup: Second round
- EFL Cup: First round
- EFL Trophy: Round of 32
- Top goalscorer: League: Rumarn Burrell (11 goals); All: Rumarn Burrell (11 goals)
- Average home league attendance: 3,254

The 2024–25 season was the 75th season in the history of Burton Albion Football Club and their seventh consecutive season in League One. In addition to the domestic league, the club would also participate in the FA Cup, the EFL Cup, and the EFL Trophy.

== Transfers ==
=== In ===
Date	Pos.	Player	From	Fee	Ref.
14 June 2024	CB	Jason Sraha (ENG)	Shrewsbury Town (ENG)	Undisclosed	
20 June 2024	CF	Julian Larsson (SWE)	Nottingham Forest (ENG)	Undisclosed	
21 June 2024	CM	Charlie Webster (ENG)	Chelsea (ENG)	Undisclosed	
24 June 2024	CM	Alex Bannon (SCO)	Queen's Park (SCO)	Undisclosed	
25 June 2024	CB	Udoka Godwin-Malife (ENG)	Swindon Town (ENG)	Undisclosed	
26 June 2024	CF	Danilo Orsi (ENG)	Crawley Town (ENG)	Undisclosed	
1 July 2024 (Note: The transfer was announced on 13 June, and would become official on July 1 once his Notts County contract expired)	CB	Geraldo Bajrami (ALB)	Notts County (ENG)	Free	
1 July 2024 (Note: The transfer was announced on 26 June, and would become official on July 1 once his Cove Rangers contract expired)	CF	Rumarn Burrell (JAM)	Cove Rangers (SCO)	Free	
1 July 2024 (Note: The transfer was announced on 14 June, and would become official on July 1 once his Den Bosch contract expired)	LW	Tomas Kalinauskas (LTU)	Den Bosch (NED)	Free	
1 July 2024 (Note: The transfer was announced on 12 June, and would become official on July 1 once his Salford City contract expired)	DM	Elliot Watt (SCO)	Salford City (ENG)	Free	
1 July 2024 (Note: The transfer was announced on 18 June, and would become official on July 1 once his Barrow contract expired)	CM	Ben Whitfield (ENG)	Barrow (ENG)	Free	
8 July 2024	LB	Jack Armer (SCO)	Carlisle United (ENG)	Undisclosed	
8 July 2024	RW	Billy Bodin (WAL)	Oxford United (ENG)	Free	
12 July 2024	CF	Jack Hazlehurst (ENG)	Chorley (ENG)	Undisclosed	
16 July 2024	CF	Jack Cooper-Love (SWE)	Elfsborg (SWE)	Undisclosed	
20 July 2024	LB	Ivan Inzoudine (FRA)	Chambly Oise (FRA)	Undisclosed	
24 July 2024	RB	Nick Akoto (USA)	Tormenta (USA)	Undisclosed	
25 July 2024	CB	Terence Vancooten (GUY)	Stevenage (ENG)	Undisclosed	
27 July 2024	GK	Harry Isted (ENG)	Charlton Athletic (ENG)	Undisclosed	
16 January 2025	CF	Jón Daði Böðvarsson (ISL)	Wrexham (WAL)	Free	
31 January 2025	CM	James Jones (SCO)	Wrexham (WAL)	Undisclosed	
20 February 2025	RM	Anthony Forde (IRL)	Wrexham (WAL)	Free	
28 February 2025	CF	Jack Stretton (SCO)	Stockport County (ENG)	Free	

=== Out ===
Date	Pos.	Player	To	Fee	Ref.
14 June 2024 (Note: The transfer was announced on 7 June, and would become official on June 14 once the transfer window re-opened)	CF	Cole Stockton (ENG)	Salford City (ENG)	Undisclosed	
1 July 2024	CF	Josh Gordon (ENG)	Walsall (ENG)	Free	
8 July 2024	CF	Josh Walker (ENG)	Southend United (ENG)	Undisclosed	
19 July 2024	RB	Tom Hamer (ENG)	Lincoln City (ENG)	Undisclosed	
25 July 2024	CM	Mark Helm (ENG)	Fleetwood Town (ENG)	Undisclosed	
13 August 2024	CB	William Tamen (ENG)	Everton (ENG)	Undisclosed	

=== Loaned in ===
Date	Pos	Player	From	Date until	Ref
3 July 2024	LB	Dylan Williams (ENG)	Chelsea (ENG)	End of Season	
30 August 2024	RW	Romelle Donovan (ENG)	Birmingham City (ENG)	6 December 2024 (Note: On 6 December, Donovan was recalled early from his season-long loan from Birmingham.)	
30 August 2024	CF	Ronnie Stutter (ENG)	Chelsea (ENG)	1 January 2025 (Note: On 1 January, Stutter was recalled early from his season-long loan from Chelsea.)	
5 September 2024	CM	Alejandro Bran (CRC)	Minnesota United (USA)	5 January 2025 (Note: On 5 January, Bran was recalled early from his season-long loan from Minnesota.)	
9 January 2025	LB	Owen Dodgson (ENG)	Burnley (ENG)	End of Season	
10 January 2025	CM	JJ McKiernan (NIR)	Lincoln City (ENG)	End of Season	
31 January 2025	CF	Fábio Tavares (POR)	Coventry City (ENG)	End of Season	
3 February 2025	RB	Kyran Lofthouse (ENG)	Barnsley (ENG)	End of Season	

=== Loaned out ===
Date	Pos.	Player	To	Date until	Ref.
20 July 2024	LB	Ivan Inzoudine (FRA)	Kalmar (SWE)	1 January 2025	
7 August 2024	GK	Kamil Dudek (POL)	Alvechurch (ENG)	1 November 2024	
9 August 2024	CF	Dylan Scott (ENG)	Mickleover (ENG)	7 September 2024	
30 August 2024	CB	Jasper Moon (ENG)	Harrogate Town (ENG)	End of Season	
24 January 2025	AM	Jack Hazlehurst (ENG)	Marine (ENG)	End of Season	
31 January 2025	DM	Elliot Watt (SCO)	St Johnstone (SCO)	End of Season	
3 February 2025	CM	Alex Bannon (SCO)	Airdrieonians (SCO)	End of Season	
3 February 2025	RW	Billy Bodin (WAL)	Reading (ENG)	End of Season	
3 February 2025	CM	Ben Whitfield (ENG)	Barrow (ENG)	End of Season	
4 February 2025	CF	Jack Cooper-Love (SWE)	De Graafschap (NED)	End of Season	
4 February 2025	CF	Danilo Orsi (ENG)	Milton Keynes Dons (ENG)	End of Season	

=== Released / Out of Contract ===
Date	Pos.	Player	Subsequent club	Join date	Ref.
30 June 2024	CB	Sam Hughes (ENG)	Stockport County (ENG)	1 July 2024	
30 June 2024	CM	Charlie Lakin (ENG)	Walsall (ENG)	1 July 2024	
30 June 2024	CB	Aristote Nsiala (COD)	Shrewsbury Town (ENG)	1 July 2024	
30 June 2024	CM	Deji Oshilaja (ENG)	Mansfield Town (ENG)	1 July 2024	
30 June 2024	AM	Joe Powell (ENG)	Rotherham United (ENG)	1 July 2024	
30 June 2024	CF	Bobby Kamwa (CMR)	Newport County (WAL)	2 August 2024	
30 June 2024	RB	Jake Caprice (ENG)	Oldham Athletic (ENG)	7 August 2024	
30 June 2024	LW	Mustapha Carayol (GAM)	Exeter City (ENG)	20 September 2024	
30 August 2024	CM	Rekeem Harper (ENG)	Port Vale (ENG)	1 November 2024	
30 June 2024	GK	Jamal Blackman (ENG)	Shrewsbury Town (ENG)	21 December 2024	
3 February 2025	LB	Ivan Inzoudine (FRA)			

== Pre-season and friendlies ==
On 3 July, the Brewers announced their pre-season schedule, with friendly matches against Port Vale, Buxton and Morecambe.

Win Draw Loss Fixtures

27 July 2024 Friendly	Burton Albion	2–0	Port Vale	Burton upon Trent
15:00 BST	Bodin 9'; Godwin-Malife 70'	Report		Stadium: Pirelli Stadium; Attendance: 1,680; Referee: Tom Reeves

30 July 2024 Friendly	Buxton	Cancelled	Burton Albion	Buxton
19:30 BST				Stadium: The Silverlands
Note: Fixture was cancelled, following the Brewers withdrawing from the fixture.

3 August 2024 Friendly	Burton Albion	2–2	Morecambe	Burton upon Trent
15:00 BST	Bodin 70'; Burrell 90+4'	Report	Tollitt 34', 45'	Stadium: Pirelli Stadium; Referee: Ross Joyce

== Competitions ==
=== League One ===
==== League table ====
Pos	Team	Pld	W	D	L	GF	GA	GD	Pts	Promotion, qualification or relegation
18	Peterborough United	46	13	12	21	68	81	−13	51	
19	Northampton Town	46	12	15	19	48	66	−18	51	
20	Burton Albion	46	11	14	21	49	66	−17	47	
21	Crawley Town (R)	46	12	10	24	57	83	−26	46	Relegation to EFL League Two
22	Bristol Rovers (R)	46	12	7	27	44	76	−32	43	Relegation to EFL League Two

Source: EFL Official Website
Rules for classification: 1) Points; 2) Goal difference; 3) Number of goals scored; 4) Head-to-head results; 5) Wins; 6) Away goals; 7) Penalty points (sec 9.5); 8) 12-point sending off offences
(R) Relegated

==== Results summary ====
Overall								Home						Away					
Pld	W	D	L	GF	GA	GD	Pts	W	D	L	GF	GA	GD	W	D	L	GF	GA	GD
44	11	13	20	47	62	−15	46	6	5	11	29	33	−4	5	8	9	18	29	−11

Last updated: 26 April 2025.
Source: Soccerway

==== Results by round ====
Round	1	2	3	4	6	7	8	9	10	12	13	14	5^{1}	15	17	11^{2}	18	19	20	21	22	23	24	25	27	16^{3}	28	29	30	31	32	26^{4}	33	34	35	36	37	39	40	41	42	43	44	45	38^{5}	46
Ground	H	A	H	A	A	H	A	A	H	A	H	A	H	H	H	H	A	H	A	H	A	A	H	H	A	A	H	H	A	H	A	A	A	H	A	H	A	A	H	A	H	A	H	H	H	A
Result	L	D	D	D	D	L	L	L	L	L	L	L	D	W	L	L	W	L	D	L	L	D	D	L	D	W	W	W	D	D	L	W	W	D	L	L	W	L	W	L	W	D	L	W	D	L
Position	15	17	19	19	20	22	22	22	23	24	24	24	24	23	24	24	23	23	23	23	24	24	24	24	24	23	21	21	21	21	23	21	21	21	21	21	21	21	21	21	20	20	20	20	20	20

Source: Soccerway
A = Away; H = Home; W = Win; D = Draw; L = Loss; P = Postponed
Notes:
- ^{1} Matchday 5 (vs Crawley Town) was postponed due to the international call-ups.
- ^{2} Matchday 11 (vs Charlton Athletic) was postponed due to the international call-ups.
- ^{3} Matchday 16 (vs Wigan Athletic) was postponed due to the international call-ups.
- ^{4} Matchday 26 (vs Stevenage) was postponed due to a frozen pitch.
- ^{5} Matchday 38 (vs Wigan Athletic) was postponed due to international call-ups.

==== Matches ====
On 26 June, the League One fixtures were announced.

Win Draw Loss Fixtures

10 August 2024 1	Burton Albion	2–3	Lincoln City	Burton upon Trent
17:30 BST	Godwin-Malife 5', (yellow card) 43'; Bodin 41'	Report	O'Connor 9', 86'; Darikwa 22'; Duffy (yellow card) 43'; Erhahon (yellow card) 90'	Stadium: Pirelli Stadium; Attendance: 5,027; Referee: Edward Duckworth

17 August 2024 2	Mansfield Town	3–3	Burton Albion	Mansfield
15:00 BST	Evans 4'; Armer 45+1' (o.g.); Reed (yellow card) 72'; Gregory 90+7' (pen.)	Report	Bodin 7', 81'; Armer (yellow card) 9'; Whitfield 69'; Vancooten (yellow card) 78'; Bajrami (yellow card) 90+6'	Stadium: Field Mill; Attendance: 7,781; Referee: Sam Purkiss

24 August 2024 3	Burton Albion	0–0	Stevenage	Burton upon Trent
12:30 BST	Godwin-Malife (yellow card) 34'; Gilligan (yellow card) 67'; Watt (yellow card) 90'	Report	Sweeney (yellow card) 7'; Thompson (yellow card) 34'; Roberts (yellow card) 34'; Simpson (yellow card) 50'; Smith (yellow card) 83'	Stadium: Pirelli Stadium; Attendance: 2,378; Referee: Charles Breakspear
Note: Fixture was initially scheduled for a 15:00 kick-off, but was moved for live Sky Sports broadcast.

31 August 2024 4	Northampton Town	0–0	Burton Albion	Northampton
15:00 BST	Hondermarck (yellow card) 26'; McGeehan (yellow card) 34'; Chouchane (yellow card) 54'	Report	Kalinauskas (yellow card) 33'; Watt (yellow card) 34'; Orsi (yellow card) 43'	Stadium: Sixfields Stadium; Attendance: 5,909; Referee: Ben Atkinson

14 September 2024 6	Rotherham United	2–2	Burton Albion	Rotherham
15:00 BST	Clarke-Harris 39'; Humphreys 57'; Odoffin (yellow card) 74'	Report	Orsi 25'; Vancooten (yellow card) 54'; Cooper Love 71'	Stadium: New York Stadium; Attendance: 8,704; Referee: Ben Speedie

21 September 2024 7	Burton Albion	1–2	Barnsley	Burton upon Trent
15:00 BST	Vancooten (yellow card) 67'; Cooper Love 88'; Akoto (yellow card) 90+6'	Report	Earl (yellow card) 3'; De Gevigney (yellow card) 20'; Connell 36'; Humphrys 90'	Stadium: Pirelli Stadium; Attendance: 3,711; Referee: Dean Whitestone

28 September 2024 8	Blackpool	3–0	Burton Albion	Blackpool
15:00 BST	Offiah 19'; Apter 50'; Evans 75'	Report	Orsi (yellow card) 37'	Stadium: Bloomfield Road; Attendance: 9,168; Referee: Geoff Eltringham

1 October 2024 9	Reading	3–1	Burton Albion	Reading
20:00 BST	Campbell 23', 42'; Ehibhatiomhan (yellow card) 50'; Smith 82'; Savage (yellow card) 85'	Report	Williams (yellow card) 41'; Watt (yellow card) 81'; Orsi 84'	Stadium: Madejski Stadium; Attendance: 8,774; Referee: Alex Chilowicz
Note: Fixture was initially scheduled for a 19:45 kick-off, but was pushed back fifteen minutes following agreement between both clubs.

5 October 2024 10	Burton Albion	1–3	Bristol Rovers	Burton upon Trent
15:00 BST	Orsi 15'; Kalinauskas (yellow card) 39'; Webster (yellow card) 45+1'; Vancooten (red card) 82'; Cooper Love (yellow card) 88'	Report	Conteh (yellow card) 45'; Forde 52'; Mola 59'; O'Donkor (yellow card) 85'; Ward 90+3'	Stadium: Pirelli Stadium; Attendance: 2,832; Referee: Alan Young

19 October 2024 12	Bolton Wanderers	2–1	Burton Albion	Bolton
15:00 BST	Johnston (yellow card) 47'; Collins 61', (yellow card) 85'; Williams 63'	Report	Bennett (yellow card) 24'; Orsi 66'; Whitfield (yellow card) 86'; Sweeney (yellow card) 90+1'	Stadium: Toughsheet Community Stadium; Attendance: 19,540; Referee: Martin Coy

22 October 2024 13	Burton Albion	2–3	Wycombe Wanderers	Burton upon Trent
19:45 BST	Sweeney (yellow card) 7'; Orsi 34'; Webster 63'	Report	Scowen (yellow card) 12'; Kodua 16', (yellow card) 49'; Taylor (yellow card) 52'; Leahy 53'; Onyedinma (yellow card) 80'; Udoh 81'	Stadium: Pirelli Stadium; Attendance: 1,993; Referee: Aaron Bannister

26 October 2024 14	Cambridge United	1–0	Burton Albion	Cambridge
15:00 BST	Bennett (yellow card) 39'; Cousins 84'; Andrew (yellow card) 90+3'	Report	Bennett (yellow card) 5'; Watt (yellow card) 23'; Bodin (yellow card) 34'	Stadium: Abbey Stadium; Attendance: 6,706; Referee: Declan Bourne

5 November 2024 5	Burton Albion	0–0	Crawley Town	Burton upon Trent
19:45 GMT	Webster (yellow card) 38'; Armer (yellow card) 69'; Bannon (yellow card) 90+1'	Report	Forster (yellow card) 40'	Stadium: Pirelli Stadium; Attendance: 1,810; Referee: Scott Oldham
Note: Fixture was originally scheduled for 7 September, but was postponed due to international call-ups.

9 November 2024 15	Burton Albion	2–0	Shrewsbury Town	Burton upon Trent
12:30 GMT	Kalinauskas 10'; Webster (yellow card) 19'; Orsi 51'	Report	Lloyd (yellow card) 86'	Stadium: Pirelli Stadium; Attendance: 2,935; Referee: Jacob Miles
Note: Fixture was initially scheduled for a 15:00 kick-off, but was moved for live Sky Sports broadcast.

23 November 2024 17	Burton Albion	0–3	Stockport County	Burton upon Trent
15:00 GMT	Bennett (yellow card) 10'; Watt (yellow card) 24'; Armer (yellow card) 61'	Report	Bate 30'; Barry 42', 59'; Norwood (yellow card) 61'; Horsfall (yellow card) 63'; Wootton (yellow card) 64'	Stadium: Pirelli Stadium; Attendance: 3,564; Referee: Ben Atkinson

26 November 2024 11	Burton Albion	0–1	Charlton Athletic	Burton upon Trent
19:45 GMT	Webster (red card) 68'	Report	Ahadme (yellow card) 8'; Edmonds-Green (yellow card) 32'; Taylor (yellow card) 68'; Campbell (yellow card) 69'; Coventry 82'; Berry (yellow card) 89'; Small (yellow card) 90+1'	Stadium: Pirelli Stadium; Attendance: 1,749; Referee: Elliot Bell
Note: Fixture was originally scheduled for 12 October, but was postponed due to international call-ups.

4 December 2024 18	Peterborough United	0–1	Burton Albion	Peterborough
19:45 GMT		Report	Bennett 64'	Stadium: London Road Stadium; Attendance: 6,043; Referee: Darren Drysdale
Note: Fixture was initially scheduled for 3 December, but was moved back a day due to Burton playing on the preceding Sunday.

7 December 2024 19	Burton Albion	0–1	Wrexham	Burton upon Trent
15:00 GMT	Sraha (yellow card) 34'	Report	Lee 65'	Stadium: Pirelli Stadium; Attendance: 3,644; Referee: Zac Kennard-Kettle

14 December 2024 20	Leyton Orient	0–0	Burton Albion	Leyton
12:30 GMT	Ball (yellow card) 77'	Report	Gilligan (yellow card) 58'; Bennett (yellow card) 71'	Stadium: Brisbane Road; Attendance: 7,267; Referee: Martin Woods
Note: Fixture was initially scheduled for a 15:00 kick-off, but was moved for live Sky Sports broadcast.

21 December 2024 21	Burton Albion	1–2	Exeter City	Burton upon Trent
15:00 GMT	Bodin 8'; Watt (yellow card) 21'; Sraha (yellow card) 59'; Gilligan (yellow card) 69'; Vancooten (yellow card) 78'	Report	Woods (yellow card) 13'; McDonald (yellow card) 43'; Magennis 45+2'; Alli 71', (yellow card) 81'; J. Richards (yellow card) 85'	Stadium: Pirelli Stadium; Attendance: 2,690; Referee: Sebastien Stockbridge

26 December 2024 22	Birmingham City	2–0	Burton Albion	Birmingham
15:00 GMT	Stansfield 26'; Crocombe 56' (o.g.)	Report	Godwin-Malife (yellow card) 45+1'; Crocombe (yellow card) 48'	Stadium: St Andrew's; Attendance: 27,524; Referee: Simon Mather

29 December 2024 23	Huddersfield Town	1–1	Burton Albion	Huddersfield
15:00 GMT	Kasumu (yellow card) 38'; Helik 88'	Report	Webster 13'; Crocombe (yellow card) 71'; Vancooten (yellow card) 73' (yellow-red card) 90+3'	Stadium: Kirklees Stadium; Attendance: 18,842; Referee: Ben Toner

1 January 2025 24	Burton Albion	2–2	Peterborough United	Burton upon Trent
15:00 GMT	Chauke 6'; Burrell 26'; Crocombe (yellow card) 77'; Williams (yellow card) 78'; Kalinauskas (yellow card) 87'	Report	Collins 42'; Fernandez 77'; Conn-Clarke (yellow card) 80'	Stadium: Pirelli Stadium; Attendance: 2,821; Referee: Matthew Corlett

4 January 2025 25	Burton Albion	0–1	Northampton Town	Burton upon Trent
12:30 GMT	Webster (yellow card) 17'	Report	Hoskins (yellow card) 84', (goal) 86'	Stadium: Pirelli Stadium; Attendance: 2,837; Referee: Ross Joyce
Note: Fixture was initially scheduled for a 15:00 kick-off, but was moved for live Sky Sports broadcast.

18 January 2025 27	Crawley Town	1–1	Burton Albion	Crawley
15:00 GMT	Radcliffe (yellow card) 50'; Ibrahim (yellow card) 70'; Showunmi 72'; Conroy (yellow card) 73'; Camará (yellow card) 81'; Barker (yellow card) 86'	Report	Burrell 25'; Dodgson (yellow card) 55'; Vancooten (yellow card) 90+4'	Stadium: Broadfield Stadium; Attendance: 3,521; Referee: Ollie Yates

21 January 2025 16	Wigan Athletic	1–2	Burton Albion	Wigan
19:45 GMT	S. Smith (yellow card) 28'; Aasgaard 32'; Norburn (yellow card) 45'	Report	Dodgson (yellow card) 4'; Webster (yellow card) 8'; Böðvarsson 34'; Burrell 59'; Watt (yellow card) 78'	Stadium: Brick Community Stadium; Attendance: 7,553
Note: Fixture was originally scheduled for 16 November, but was postponed due to international call-ups.

25 January 2025 28	Burton Albion	4–2	Rotherham United	Burton upon Trent
15:00 GMT	Böðvarsson 8', 41'; McKiernan (yellow card) 27', (goal) 47'; Sweeney 39'; Armer (yellow card) 67'	Report	Sibley 2'; Green 61'	Stadium: Pirelli Stadium; Attendance: 3,733; Referee: Tom Reeves

28 January 2025 29	Burton Albion	3–2	Reading	Burton upon Trent
19:45 GMT	Burrell 10', 90+2'; Böðvarsson 29'	Report	Ehibhatiomhan (yellow card) 36'; Garcia (yellow card) 44'; Craig 69'; Smith 71'	Stadium: Pirelli Stadium; Attendance: 2,358; Referee: Will Finnie

1 February 2025 30	Barnsley	0–0	Burton Albion	Barnsley
12:30 GMT	de Gevigney (yellow card) 81'	Report	Armer (yellow card) 82'; McKiernan (yellow card) 90+2'	Stadium: Oakwell; Attendance: 10,555; Referee: Sunny Singh Gill
Note: Fixture was initially scheduled for a 15:00 kick-off, but was moved for live Sky Sports broadcasting.

8 February 2025 31	Burton Albion	1–1	Blackpool	Burton upon Trent
15:00 GMT	Burrell 19'; Dodgson (yellow card) 76'; Crocombe (yellow card) 89'	Report	Morgan 90+4'	Stadium: Pirelli Stadium; Attendance: 2,965; Referee: Carl Brook

15 February 2025 32	Bristol Rovers	3–1	Burton Albion	Bristol
15:00 GMT	Martin 13', (yellow card) 35'; Thomas (yellow card) 69', (goal) 87'; Hutchinson 90+9'	Report	Chauke (yellow card) 66'; Tavares 82'; Bennett (yellow card) 90+5'	Stadium: Memorial Stadium; Attendance: 7,938; Referee: Thomas Kirk

18 February 2025 26	Stevenage	0–1	Burton Albion	Stevenage
19:45 GMT	Reid (penalty missed) 56'	Report	Webster 45'; Vancooten (red card) 57'; Dodgson (yellow card) 79'; Crocombe (yellow card) 90'; Godwin-Malife (yellow card) 90+2'	Stadium: Broadhall Way; Attendance: 2,801; Referee: James Durkin
Note: Fixture was originally scheduled for 11 January, but was postponed due to a frozen pitch.

22 February 2025 33	Lincoln City	0–1	Burton Albion	Lincoln
15:00 GMT		Report	Webster 90+2'	Stadium: Sincil Bank; Attendance: 8,507; Referee: Ruebyn Ricardo

1 March 2025 34	Burton Albion	1–1	Mansfield Town	Burton upon Trent
15:00 GMT	Dodgson 13'; McKiernan (yellow card) 81'; Jones (yellow card) 89'	Report	Hewitt (yellow card) 43'; Sweeney 52' (o.g.); McLaughlin (yellow card) 55'; Akins (penalty missed) 89'	Stadium: Pirelli Stadium; Attendance: 5,007; Referee: Matthew Russell

4 March 2025 35	Wycombe Wanderers	2–0	Burton Albion	High Wycombe
20:00 GMT	Udoh 16'; Kone (yellow card) 44'; Armer 59' (o.g.)	Report	Dodgson (yellow card) 90+2'	Stadium: Adams Park; Attendance: 3,456; Referee: Alex Chilowicz
Note: Fixture was initially scheduled for a 15:00 kick-off, but was moved for live Sky Sports broadcasting.

8 March 2025 36	Burton Albion	1–2	Bolton Wanderers	Burton upon Trent
15:00 GMT	McKiernan (yellow card) 29'; Armer (yellow card) 42'; Sweeney 53'; Lofthouse (yellow card) 59'; Bennett (yellow card) 79'	Report	Morley 22'; Sheehan (yellow card) 47', (goal) 60'; Murphy (yellow card) 76'	Stadium: Pirelli Stadium; Attendance: 4,172; Referee: Lee Swabey

15 March 2025 37	Shrewsbury Town	0–2	Burton Albion	Shrewsbury
15:00 GMT	Gape (yellow card) 62'; Gilliead (yellow card) 82'	Report	Dodgson (yellow card) 27'; Burrell 72'; Vancooten 86'	Stadium: New Meadow; Attendance: 5,807; Referee: Declan Bourne

29 March 2025 39	Stockport County	2–1	Burton Albion	Edgeley
12:30 GMT	Wootton 8'; Touray (yellow card) 24'; Fevrier (yellow card) 45+3'; Pye (yellow card) 53' (yellow-red card) 90+4'; Olaofe 76'	Report	McKiernan (yellow card) 27'; Lofthouse (yellow card) 45+2'; Sweeney (yellow card) 55'; Larsson 89'	Stadium: Edgeley Park; Attendance: 9,554; Referee: Elliot Bell
Note: Fixture was initially scheduled for a 15:00 kick-off, but was moved for live Sky Sports broadcasting.

1 April 2025 40	Burton Albion	2–1	Leyton Orient	Burton upon Trent
19:45 BST		Report		Stadium: Pirelli Stadium

5 April 2025 41	Wrexham	3–0	Burton Albion	Wrexham
12:30 BST	Rathbone (yellow card) 33'; Fletcher 71' (pen.); Smith 74'; Marriott 87'	Report	Webster (red card) 10'; Dodgson (yellow card) 49'; Crocombe (yellow card) 90'	Stadium: Racecourse Ground; Attendance: 12,829; Referee: Seb Stockbridge
Note: Fixture was initially scheduled for a 15:00 kick-off, but was moved for live Sky Sports broadcasting.

12 April 2025 42	Burton Albion	3–0	Huddersfield Town	Burton upon Trent
15:00 BST	Burrell 9', 55'; Dodgson (yellow card) 20'; Larsson 45'; Williams (yellow card) 71'	Report	Balker (yellow card) 51'; Hogg (yellow card) 53'; Evans (yellow card) 70'	Stadium: Pirelli Stadium; Attendance: 4,278; Referee: Scott Jackson

18 April 2025 43	Exeter City	0–0	Burton Albion	Exeter
13:00 BST	McDonald (yellow card) 27'; Turns (yellow card) 55'; MacDonald (yellow card) 88'	Report	Sweeney (yellow card) 33'; Lofthouse (yellow card) 64'; Chauke (yellow card) 86'	Stadium: St James Park; Attendance: 6,972; Referee: Jacob Miles
Note: Fixture was initially scheduled for a 15:00 kick-off, but was brought forward two hours following agreement between both clubs.

21 April 2025 44	Burton Albion	1–2	Birmingham City	Burton upon Trent
15:00 BST	Delap (yellow card) 84'; Tavares 90+4'	Report	Sampsted 44'; Stansfield 45+2'; Anderson (yellow card) 89'; Klarer (yellow card) 90+5'	Stadium: Pirelli Stadium; Attendance: 4,928; Referee: Matt Corlett

26 April 2025 45	Burton Albion	2–1	Cambridge United	Burton upon Trent
15:00 BST	McKiernan (yellow card) 27' (yellow-red card) 45+4'; Böðvarsson 48'; Williams 90+3'	Report	Kaikai (yellow card) 33'; Loft (red card) 45+3'; Kachunga 84'	Stadium: Pirelli Stadium; Attendance: 3,540; Referee: Will Finnie

29 April 2025 38	Burton Albion	1–1	Wigan Athletic	Burton upon Trent
19:45 BST	Burrell 57'; Bennett (yellow card) 60'	Report	Darcy 90+6'	Stadium: Pirelli Stadium; Attendance: Darren Drysdale; Referee: 3,506
Note: Fixture was initially scheduled for 22 March, but was rearranged due to international call-ups.

3 May 2025 46	Charlton Athletic	3-1	Burton Albion	Charlton
15:00 BST	Maynard-Brewer (yellow card) 12'			Stadium: The Valley

=== FA Cup ===
Burton Albion were drawn at home to Scarborough Athletic in the first round and then to Tamworth in the second round.

Win Draw Loss Fixtures

2 November 2024 First round	Burton Albion	1–0	Scarborough Athletic	Burton upon Trent
15:00 GMT	Cooper Love (penalty missed) 27'; Sweeney (yellow card) 62'; Kalinauskas 69'; Orsi (yellow card) 74'; Williams (yellow card) 90+1'	Report	Gooda (yellow card) 27'; Tear (yellow card) 50'; Mulhern (yellow card) 90+6'	Stadium: Pirelli Stadium; Attendance: 3,066; Referee: Simon Mather

1 December 2024 Second round	Burton Albion	1–1 (a.e.t.) (3–4 p)	Tamworth	Burton upon Trent
14:00 GMT	Godwin-Malife (yellow card) 41'; Armer (yellow card) 56'; Watt (yellow card) 64'; Larsson (yellow card) 90+8'; Bennett 92'; Whitfield (yellow card) 116'	Report	Cullinane-Liburd (yellow card) 25'; Williams (yellow card) 52'; Maher 94'; Fletcher (yellow card) 110'; Crompton (yellow card) 118'; Enoru (yellow card) 120+2'	Stadium: Pirelli Stadium; Attendance: 4,393; Referee: Thomas Kirk
	Penalties
	Orsi (penalty missed); Bennett (penalty scored); Whitfield (penalty missed); Watt (penalty scored); Sweeney (penalty scored)		(penalty scored) Milnes; (penalty scored) Fletcher; (penalty missed) Crompton; (penalty scored) Morrison; (penalty scored) Hollis

=== EFL Cup ===
On 27 June, the draw for the first round was made, with Burton being drawn at home against Blackpool.

Win Draw Loss Fixtures

13 August 2024 First round	Burton Albion	0–4	Blackpool	Burton upon Trent
19:45 BST	Sweeney (red card) 11'; Chauke (yellow card) 48'	Report	Fletcher (penalty missed) 13'; Finnigan 69'; Pennington 76', 81'; Evans 90+1'	Stadium: Pirelli Stadium; Attendance: 1,522; Referee: Matthew Corlett

=== EFL Trophy ===
In the group stage, Burton were drawn into Southern Group F alongside Northampton Town, Notts County and Leicester City. In the round of 32, Burton were drawn at home against Stevenage.

==== Group stage ====
Pos	Div	Team	Pld	W	PW	PL	L	GF	GA	GD	Pts	Qualification
1	L1	Burton Albion	3	2	0	0	1	9	5	+4	6	Advance to Round 2
2	L1	Northampton Town	3	2	0	0	1	7	5	+2	6	Advance to Round 2
3	L2	Notts County	3	2	0	0	1	3	3	0	6	
4	ACA	Leicester City U21	3	0	0	0	3	1	7	−6	0	

Source: EFL

Win Draw Loss Fixtures

20 August 2024 Group stage	Burton Albion	3–1	Leicester City U21	Burton upon Trent
19:00 BST	Gilligan (yellow card) 29'; Delap (yellow card) 32'; Bennett (yellow card) 46', (goal) 68'; Sweeney 83'; Orsi 84'	Report	Richards 57'; Wormleighton (yellow card) 64'	Stadium: Pirelli Stadium; Attendance: 473; Referee: Martin Woods

24 September 2024 Group stage	Burton Albion	1–2	Notts County	Burton upon Trent
19:00 BST	Gilligan (yellow card) 18'; Whitfield 87'; Orsi (yellow card) 88'	Report	Gordon 29', (yellow card) 39'; Austin 54'; Cisse (yellow card) 58'	Stadium: Pirelli Stadium; Referee: Elliot Bell
Note: Fixture was initially scheduled for 3 September, but was pushed back three weeks.

12 November 2024 Group stage	Northampton Town	2–5	Burton Albion	Northampton
19:00 GMT	Dobson 2'; Waghorn (yellow card) 34', (goal) 47'	Report	Akoto 13'; Williams 36'; Webster 39'; Donovan 49'; Whitfield 66'	Stadium: Sixfields Stadium; Attendance: 778; Referee: James Durkin

==== Knockout stages ====
10 December 2024 Round of 32	Burton Albion	0–4	Stevenage	Burton upon Trent
19:00 GMT	Bran (yellow card) 2'; Williams (yellow card) 20'; Gilligan (yellow card) 72'; Whitfield (yellow card) 74'	Report	Freestone 6'; Simpson 54'; Piergianni (yellow card) 62'; Aboh 78'; White 83'	Stadium: Pirelli Stadium; Attendance: 321; Referee: Richard Eley

== Statistics ==
=== Appearances and goals ===
As of match played 26 April 2025

Players with no appearances are not included on the list
Italics indicate a loaned in player

No.	Pos	Nat	Player	Total		League One		FA Cup		EFL Cup		EFL Trophy	
No.	Pos	Nat	Player	Apps	Goals	Apps	Goals	Apps	Goals	Apps	Goals	Apps	Goals
1	GK	(New Zealand) NZL	Max Crocombe	43	0	41+0	0	1+0	0	1+0	0	0+0	0
2	DF	(England) ENG	Udoka Godwin-Malife	44	1	37+3	1	1+1	0	0+0	0	1+1	0
3	DF	(England) ENG	Owen Dodgson	20	1	20+0	1	0+0	0	0+0	0	0+0	0
4	MF	(Scotland) SCO	Elliot Watt	30	0	24+1	0	2+0	0	1+0	0	0+2	0
5	DF	(Albania) ALB	Geraldo Bajrami	2	0	0+1	0	0+0	0	0+0	0	1+0	0
6	DF	(Republic of Ireland) IRL	Ryan Sweeney	45	3	41+0	2	2+0	0	1+0	0	1+0	1
7	FW	(Lithuania) LTU	Tomas Kalinauskas	42	2	18+20	1	1+1	1	1+0	0	1+0	0
8	FW	(England) ENG	Charlie Webster	33	6	24+6	5	1+0	0	0+0	0	2+0	1
9	FW	(England) ENG	Danilo Orsi	32	7	18+9	6	1+1	0	0+0	0	2+1	1
10	FW	(Iceland) ISL	Jón Daði Böðvarsson	12	5	10+2	5	0+0	0	0+0	0	0+0	0
11	FW	(Wales) WAL	Billy Bodin	15	4	7+5	4	1+0	0	0+1	0	1+0	0
12	MF	(England) ENG	Jack Hazlehurst	3	0	1+1	0	0+0	0	0+0	0	1+0	0
13	GK	(England) ENG	Harry Isted	8	0	3+0	0	1+0	0	0+0	0	4+0	0
14	DF	(United States) USA	Nick Akoto	20	1	6+8	0	1+0	0	1+0	0	4+0	1
15	DF	(Guyana) GUY	Terence Vancooten	34	1	29+1	1	2+0	0	1+0	0	0+1	0
16	FW	(Sweden) SWE	Jack Cooper-Love	21	2	6+8	2	2+0	0	0+1	0	2+2	0
17	DF	(Scotland) SCO	Jack Armer	40	0	31+5	0	1+0	0	1+0	0	0+2	0
18	FW	(Jamaica) JAM	Rumarn Burrell	33	10	25+4	10	0+0	0	0+1	0	3+0	0
19	DF	(England) ENG	Dylan Williams	31	2	13+11	1	1+1	0	1+0	0	4+0	1
20	DF	(England) ENG	Jason Sraha	17	0	11+3	0	0+0	0	0+0	0	3+0	0
21	MF	(Scotland) SCO	Alex Bannon	12	0	9+0	0	0+0	0	0+0	0	3+0	0
22	FW	(Sweden) SWE	Julian Larsson	13	2	5+5	2	0+1	0	0+0	0	1+1	0
23	FW	(Portugal) POR	Fábio Tavares	8	2	0+8	2	0+0	0	0+0	0	0+0	0
24	MF	(Northern Ireland) NIR	JJ McKiernan	19	1	19+0	1	0+0	0	0+0	0	0+0	0
25	MF	(Republic of Ireland) IRL	Ciaran Gilligan	16	0	8+4	0	0+1	0	0+0	0	2+1	0
26	DF	(England) ENG	Finn Delap	4	0	1+2	0	0+0	0	0+0	0	1+0	0
29	DF	(England) ENG	Toby Oakes	1	0	0+0	0	0+0	0	0+0	0	0+1	0
32	FW	(England) ENG	Mason Bennett	35	3	14+18	1	0+1	1	1+0	0	1+0	1
33	MF	(South Africa) RSA	Kegs Chauke	40	1	31+6	1	1+0	0	1+0	0	0+1	0
34	MF	(England) ENG	Ben Whitfield	30	3	13+10	1	1+1	0	1+0	0	2+2	2
35	MF	(Scotland) SCO	James Jones	4	0	1+3	0	0+0	0	0+0	0	0+0	0
36	DF	(England) ENG	Kyran Lofthouse	15	0	13+2	0	0+0	0	0+0	0	0+0	0
38	FW	(England) ENG	Jack Newall	1	0	0+0	0	0+0	0	0+0	0	0+1	0
39	DF	(England) ENG	Josh Taroni	3	0	0+1	0	0+0	0	0+0	0	0+2	0
44	MF	(Republic of Ireland) IRL	Anthony Forde	9	0	3+6	0	0+0	0	0+0	0	0+0	0
47	FW	(Scotland) SCO	Jack Stretton	3	0	0+3	0	0+0	0	0+0	0	0+0	0
Player(s) who featured whilst on loan but returned to parent club during the season:
23	MF	(Costa Rica) CRC	Alejandro Bran	4	0	0+1	0	1+0	0	0+0	0	2+0	0
24	FW	(England) ENG	Ronnie Stutter	1	0	0+1	0	0+0	0	0+0	0	0+0	0
49	FW	(England) ENG	Romelle Donovan	9	1	1+5	0	1+0	0	0+0	0	2+0	1
