= Owen Dodgson =

English footballer (born 2003)

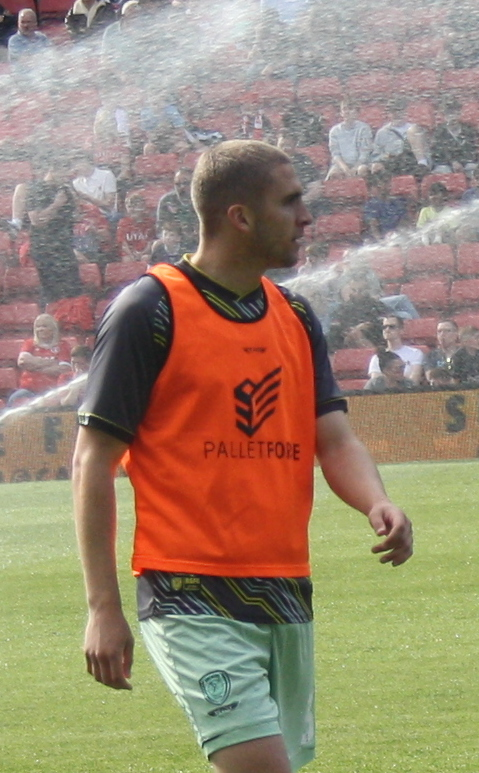
- Dodgson in 2025

Personal information
- Full name: Owen Joel Dodgson
- Date of birth: 19 March 2003 (age 23)
- Place of birth: Lancaster, England
- Height: 5 ft 10 in (1.78 m)
- Positions: Left-back; left wing-back

Team information
- Current team: Mansfield Town (on loan from Stockport County)
- Number: 39

Youth career
- –2020: Manchester United
- 2020–2021: Burnley

Senior career*
Years	Team	Apps	(Gls)
2021–2026	Burnley	0	(0)
2023	→ Rochdale (loan)	18	(1)
2023–2024	→ Barnsley (loan)	10	(0)
2024	→ Dundee (loan)	16	(0)
2025	→ Burton Albion (loan)	22	(1)
2025–2026	→ Stockport County (loan)	16	(0)
2026–	Stockport County	0	(0)
2026–	→ Mansfield Town (loan)	3	(0)
- * Club domestic league appearances and goals as of 23:41, 2 September 2026 (UTC)

Owen Joel Dodgson (born 19 March 2003) is an English footballer who plays as a left-back or left wing-back for EFL League One club Mansfield Town, on loan from EFL League One club Stockport County.

== Career ==
Born in Lancaster, Lancashire, Dodgson started his career in the academy at Manchester United eventually progressing to play for the under-18 side after he was offered a two-year scholarship in July 2019. He joined Premier League side Burnley in November 2020 following a successful trial along with Calen Gallagher-Allison, opting to leave Manchester United, stating that the first team pathway at Turf Moor was part of his decision making. On 7 July 2021, he signed his first professional contract for the club along with six other youngsters. His first introduction to senior football was when he was named as an unused substitute for the 2–0 defeat at Anfield to Liverpool on 21 August 2021. Dodgson started to train regularly with the senior squad, impressing with his left footed delivery after also making an impact with the under-23 squad. He made his professional debut on 8 January 2022, when he replaced Dale Stephens as a late substitute in the 2–1 defeat to Huddersfield Town in the FA Cup third round. On 7 July 2022, he signed a new three-year deal with the club having also appeared on the bench five times in the Premier League.

On 27 January 2023, Dodgson joined League Two club Rochdale on loan until the end of the season.

On 1 September 2023, Dodgson joined League One side Barnsley on loan until the end of the season. He scored on his debut on 5 September, in a 2–0 victory over Grimsby Town in the EFL Trophy. Dodgson was recalled by Burnley on 1 January 2024.

On 19 January 2024, Dodgson joined Scottish Premiership club Dundee on loan until the end of the season. He made his debut for the Dark Blues the following day as substitute in a Scottish Cup game away to Kilmarnock. On 21 May 2024, Burnley said the player would be returning once the loan ended.

On 3 July 2024, Dodgson penned a new deal with Burnley, keeping him with the Clarets until 2027. On 9 January 2025, he joined League One side Burton Albion on loan for the remainder of the season. On 1 March 2025, Dodgson scored his first goal for the Brewers in a home draw against Mansfield Town.

On 31 July 2025, Dodgson joined League One side Stockport County on loan until the end of the season with a view to a permanent move next summer. In May 2026, the deal was made permanent after the club triggered the buy clause in the loan deal. On 11 August, Dodgson joined fellow League One side Mansfield Town on a season-long loan.

== Career statistics ==
As of match played 2 September 2026

Appearances and goals by club, season and competition
Club	Season	League			National Cup (Note: Includes FA Cup, Scottish Cup)		League Cup		Other		Total	
Club	Season	Division	Apps	Goals	Apps	Goals	Apps	Goals	Apps	Goals	Apps	Goals
Burnley	2021–22	Premier League	0	0	1	0	0	0	—		1	0
Burnley	2022–23	Championship	0	0	0	0	0	0	—		0	0
Burnley	2024–25	Championship	0	0	0	0	0	0	—		0	0
Burnley	Total		0	0	1	0	0	0	—		1	0
Rochdale (loan)	2022–23	League Two	18	1	—		—		—		18	1
Barnsley (loan)	2023–24	League One	10	0	2	0	—		3 (Note: Appearances in EFL Trophy)	1	15	1
Dundee (loan)	2023–24	Scottish Premiership	16	0	1	0	—		—		17	0
Burton Albion (loan)	2024–25	League One	22	1	—		—		0	0	22	1
Stockport County (loan)	2025–26	League One	16	0	2	0	2	0	5	0	25	0
Stockport County	2026–27	League One	0	0	0	0	0	0	0	0	0	0
Mansfield Town (loan)	2026–27	League One	3	0	0	0	0	0	1	0	4	0
Career total			85	2	6	0	2	0	9	1	102	3

== Honours ==
Stockport County

- EFL Trophy runner-up: 2025–26
