= Jack Hazlehurst =

English footballer (born 1999)

Personal information
- Full name: Jack Thomas Hazlehurst
- Date of birth: 25 November 1999 (age 26)
- Place of birth: Liverpool, England
- Height: 1.73 m (5 ft 8 in)
- Position: Midfielder

Team information
- Current team: Chorley

Senior career*
Years	Team	Apps	(Gls)
2017–2023	City of Liverpool		
2023–2024	Chorley	36	(10)
2024–2026	Burton Albion	3	(0)
2025	→ Marine (loan)	16	(2)
2026	Marine	10	(1)
2026–	Chorley	0	(0)
- * Club domestic league appearances and goals as of 12:48, 3 July 2026 (UTC)

Jack Thomas Hazlehurst (born 25 November 1999) is an English semi-professional footballer who plays as a midfielder for National League North club Chorley.

== Career ==
In 2017, Hazlehurst joined North West Counties Football League Premier Division side City of Liverpool from Liverpool Football College. During his time at the club, he earned the nickname of the Purple Messi for his scoring exploits in the club's purple kit.

In June 2023, Hazlehurst signed for National League North side Chorley for an undisclosed fee. Following an impressive start to his time at the club, he signed a new long-term contract in December 2023.

=== Burton Albion ===
On 12 July 2024, Hazlehurst signed for League One club Burton Albion for an undisclosed fee, signing a three-year deal with the club. Due to injury, he had to wait until 23 November 2024 to make his debut for the club, appearing as a half-time substitute in a 3–0 home defeat to Stockport County.

On 24 January 2025, Hazlehurst joined National League North side Marine on loan for the remainder of the season.

=== Marine ===
In February 2026, he was released by Burton Albion, and subsequently joined Marine again.

=== Return to Chorley ===
In July 2026, Hazlehurst returned to Chorley on a permanent deal.

== Career statistics ==
As of 2 February 2026

Appearances and goals by club, season and competition
Club	Season	League			FA Cup		League Cup		Other		Total	
Club	Season	Division	Apps	Goals	Apps	Goals	Apps	Goals	Apps	Goals	Apps	Goals
City of Liverpool	2019–20	Northern Premier League Division One West	18	2	4	4	—		4 (Note: Two appearances in FA Trophy, one appearance in Northern Premier League Cup, one appearance in Liverpool Senior Cup)	0	26	6
City of Liverpool	2020–21	Northern Premier League Division One West	7	2	2	1	—		3 (Note: Appearance(s) in FA Trophy)	3	12	6
City of Liverpool	2021–22	Northern Premier League Division One West	31	14	2	0	—		1	0	34	14
City of Liverpool	2022–23	Northern Premier League Division One West	22	7	1	0	—		2 (Note: One appearance in FA Trophy, one appearance in Liverpool Senior Cup)	0	25	7
City of Liverpool	Total		78	25	9	5	0	0	10	3	97	33
Chorley	2023–24	National League North	34	10	3	1	—		6 (Note: Four appearances and one goal in FA Trophy, two appearances in National League North play-offs)	1	43	12
Burton Albion	2024–25	League One	2	0	0	0	0	0	1 (Note: Appearance(s) in EFL Trophy)	0	3	0
Burton Albion	2025–26	League One	1	0	0	0	0	0	1	0	2	0
Burton Albion	Total		3	0	0	0	0	0	2	0	5	0
Marine (loan)	2024–25	National League North	16	2	0	0	—		0	0	16	2
Career total			131	37	12	6	0	0	18	4	161	47

== Personal life ==
Before turning professional, Hazlehurst worked in a primary school.
