= Romelle Donovan =

English footballer (born 2006)

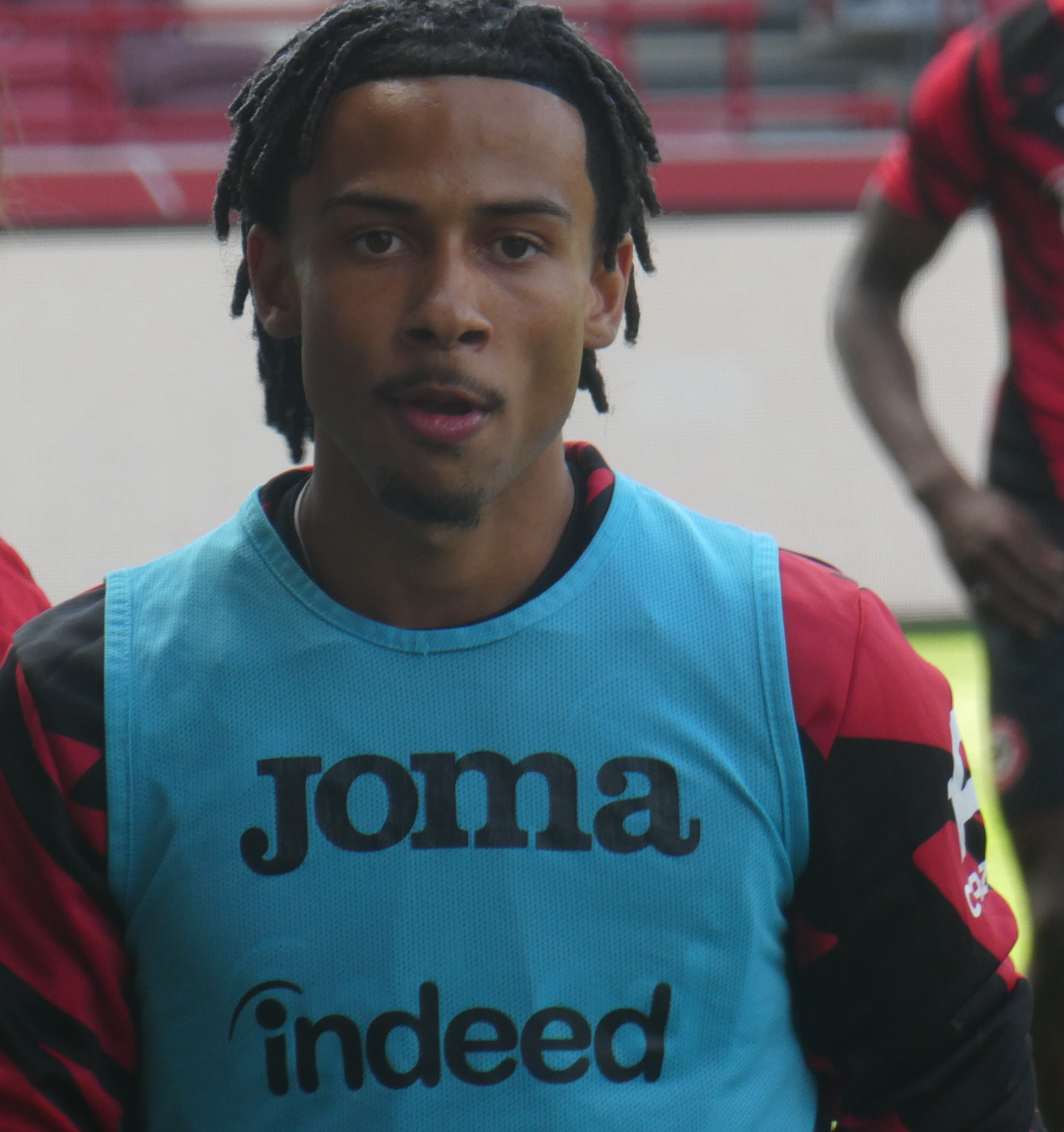
- Donovan in 2026

Personal information
- Full name: Romelle Troy Donovan
- Date of birth: 30 November 2006 (age 19)
- Place of birth: Birmingham, England
- Height: 1.71 m (5 ft 7 in)
- Position: Attacking midfielder

Team information
- Current team: Sheffield United (on loan from Brentford)
- Number: 11

Youth career
- 2013–2023: Birmingham City

Senior career*
Years	Team	Apps	(Gls)
2023–2025	Birmingham City	7	(0)
2024	→ Burton Albion (loan)	6	(0)
2025	→ Brentford (loan)	0	(0)
2025–	Brentford	4	(0)
2026–	→ Sheffield United (loan)	14	(1)

International career^{‡}
2024	England U18	2	(1)
2024	England U19	2	(0)
2025–	England U20	1	(0)
- * Club domestic league appearances and goals as of 22:28, 21 November 2026 (UTC) ‡ National team caps and goals as of 13:38, 9 October 2025 (UTC)

Romelle Troy Donovan (born 30 November 2006) is an English professional footballer who plays as an attacking midfielder or winger for EFL Championship club Sheffield United, on loan from Premier League club Brentford.

He made his Football League debut for Birmingham City as a 16-year-old, and spent time loan at Burton Albion before joining Brentford on loan with the expectation of playing for their B team. Internationally, he has represented England at under-18 and under-19 level.

== Club career ==
=== Birmingham City ===
Donovan was born in Birmingham, and joined Birmingham City's youth system at the pre-academy stage. In early 2023, first-team head coach John Eustace included Donovan in the matchday squads for all three of Birmingham's FA Cup ties, but did not use him. Had he taken the field, he would have become the club's second youngest debutant, behind Jude Bellingham but ahead of Jude's brother Jobe.

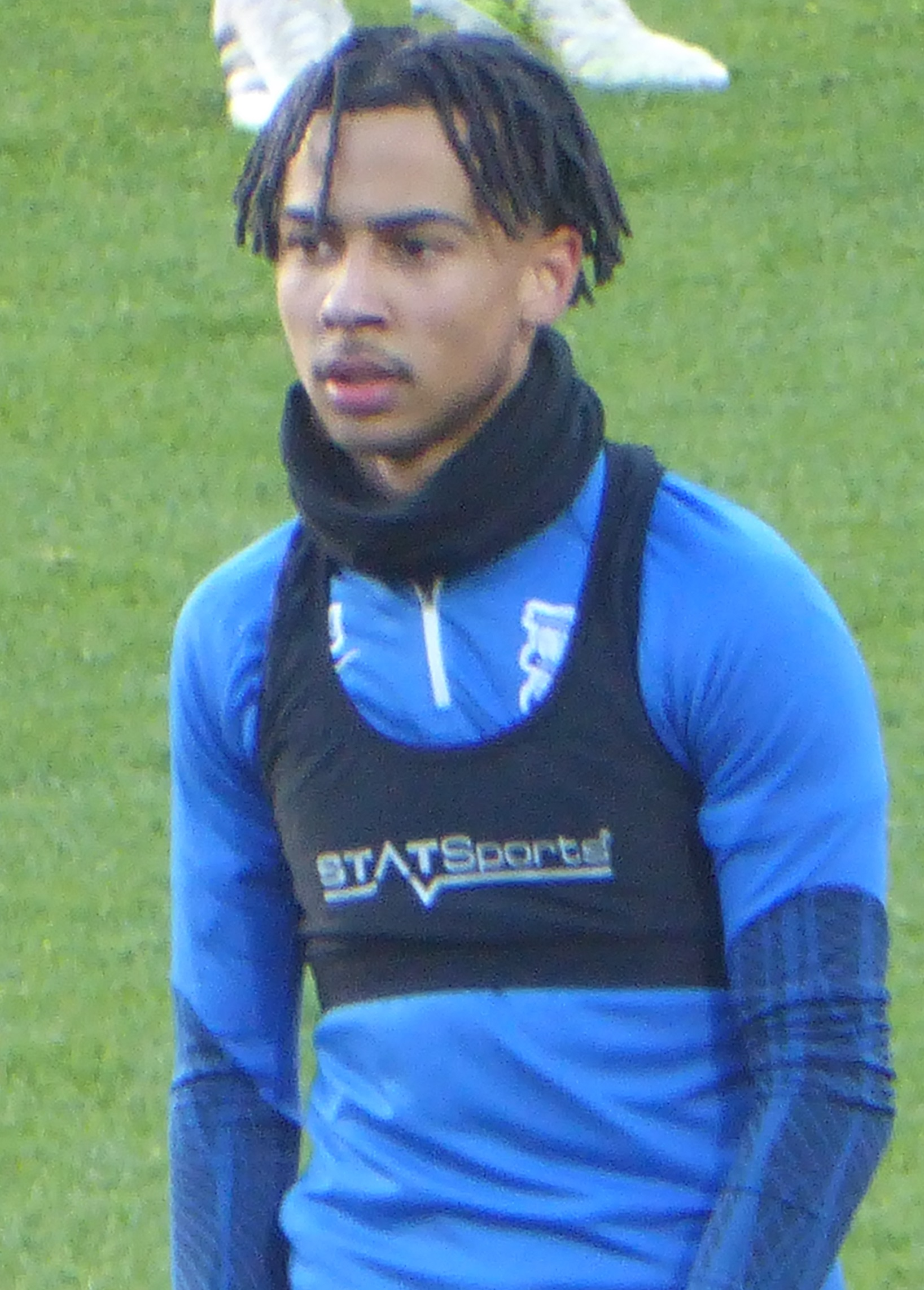
Donovan in 2023

Donovan took up a two-year scholarship with Birmingham City ahead of the 2023–24 season. Under-18s coach Martyn Olorenshaw described him as "a creative midfield player with a strong left foot [who] loves scoring from distance with a strong playing personality." He was included in the party for the first-team's pre-season training camp in Spain in July 2023. Still only 16, he began the season as a regular in Birmingham's under-21 team, whose coach, Steve Spooner, said: "With Romelle, when you play him wide he is a danger but if he doesn't see too much of the ball you want him on the ball. We put him in the ten role and he starts creating things and makes things happen", but he needed "to get better disciplined when the ball changes hands." Eustace named Donovan among the substitutes for both of Birmingham's 2023–24 EFL Cup matches, but again he remained unused.

When Wayne Rooney took over as manager in mid-October 2023, he brought Donovan in to train with the first team and named him on the bench for his first match in charge, away to Middlesbrough. Again, Donovan was unused, but he made his Championship debut four days later, replacing Oliver Burke for the last few minutes of a 2–0 defeat at home to Hull City. On 30 November 2023, his 17th birthday, Donovan signed his first professional contract, to run until June 2026. He finished the season with ten appearances, of which seven were in league matches.

==== Loan spells ====
Donovan joined League One rivals Burton Albion on 24 August 2024 on loan for the remainder of the season. In early December, however, he was recalled early by his parent club.

On deadline day, he signed for Brentford on loan for the remainder of the 2024–25 season, with the expectation of playing for Brentford B. The deal included an option to purchase.

=== Brentford ===
On 2 June 2025, it was announced that Donovan had signed permanently for Brentford. The 18 year-old joined on a five-year deal with an option to extend for an additional year.

On 8 July 2026, Donovan joined Sheffield United on a season-long loan.

== International career ==
Born in England and of Kittitian descent, Donovan holds dual-citizenship. On 22 May 2024, Donovan made a goalscoring debut for the England U18s during a 4–2 win over Northern Ireland at St George's Park. He received his first call-up to the England U19s for friendly matches in Croatia in early September. He made his debut for that age group in the starting eleven for the opening match, a 2–2 draw with Italy on 4 September in which he played the first hour and crossed the ball for Ethan Nwaneri to make the score 1–2. He appeared as a substitute in the second game, a 1–1 draw against Croatia three days later, and remained unused in the third.

On 5 September 2025, Donovan made his U20 debut as a substitute during a 2–1 defeat to Italy at the SMH Group Stadium.

== Career statistics ==
As of 8 September 2026

Appearances and goals by club, season and competition
Club	Season	League			FA Cup		EFL Cup		Other		Total	
Club	Season	Division	Apps	Goals	Apps	Goals	Apps	Goals	Apps	Goals	Apps	Goals
Birmingham City	2022–23	Championship	0	0	0	0	0	0	—		0	0
Birmingham City	2023–24	Championship	7	0	3	0	0	0	—		10	0
Birmingham City	2024–25	League One	0	0	0	0	0	0	0	0	0	0
Birmingham City	Total		7	0	3	0	0	0	0	0	10	0
Burton Albion (loan)	2024–25	League One	6	0	1	0	—		2 (Note: Appearances in EFL Trophy)	1	9	1
Brentford	2025–26	Premier League	4	0	3	0	2	0	—		9	0
Brentford	2026–27	Premier League	0	0	0	0	0	0	0	0	0	0
Brentford	Total		4	0	3	0	2	0	0	0	9	0
Sheffield United (loan)	2026–27	Championship	5	1	0	0	2	1	—		7	2
Career total			22	1	7	0	4	1	2	1	35	3
