= Ivan Inzoudine =

French footballer (born 1996)

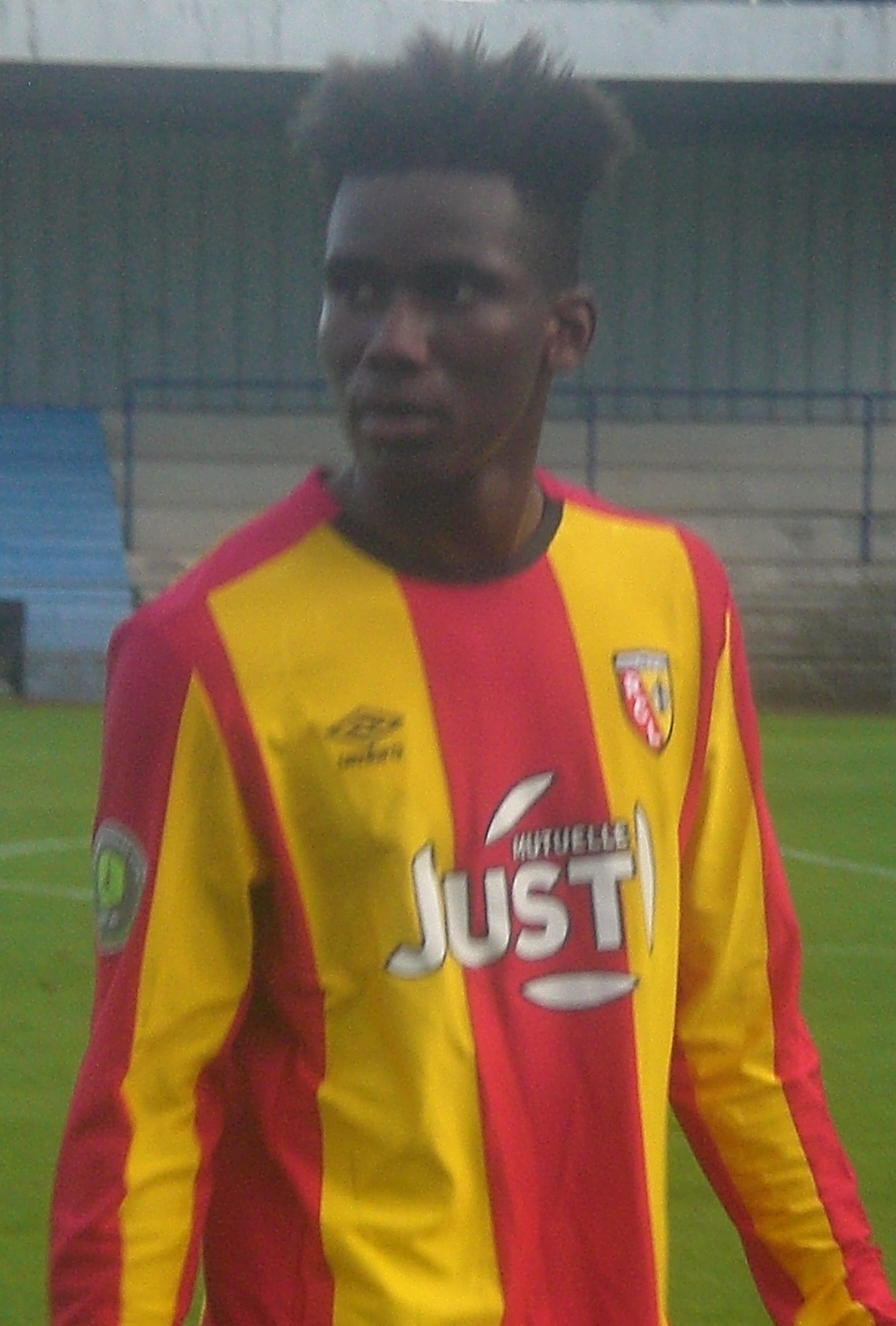
- Inzoudine with Lens B in 2015

Personal information
- Date of birth: 10 December 1996 (age 29)
- Place of birth: Bobigny, France
- Height: 1.74 m (5 ft 9 in)
- Position: Left-back

Team information
- Current team: Hamrun Spartans
- Number: 93

Youth career
- AF Bobigny
- Lens

Senior career*
Years	Team	Apps	(Gls)
2014–2016	Lens B	29	(0)
2016–2017	Guingamp B	19	(1)
2017	Guingamp	0	(0)
2018	Messina	9	(0)
2018–2019	Cavese	13	(0)
2019–2020	Marsala	9	(0)
2021	Marina di Ragusa	11	(0)
2021–2022	Saint-Malo	25	(1)
2022–2024	Chambly	34	(0)
2024–2025	Burton Albion	0	(0)
2024	→ Kalmar FF (loan)	4	(0)
2026–	Hamrun Spartans	5	(0)
- * Club domestic league appearances and goals as of 7 May 2026

Ivan Inzoudine (born 10 December 1996) is a French professional footballer who plays as a left-back for Maltese Premier League club Hamrun Spartans.

== Career ==
=== Lens ===
Inzoudine is a product of AF Bobigny and later joined Lens as a U14 player. He made his debut for the club's B-team in the Championnat National 2 in August 2014 and played a total of 29 games for the team. However, after struggling to get through to the first team, he left the club in the summer 2016.

=== Guingamp ===
After a successful trial, including a friendly game against Brest, Inzoudine joined Guingamp on 17 July 2016, where he was registered for the club's B-team. Inzoudine was a regular starter for the club's B-team in the Championnat National 3, which also earned him a spot on the bench for two first team games: The first one in Coupe de France on 1 March 2017 and the second one two days later in Ligue 1. However, he never made his first team debut before leaving the club at the end of the season.

=== Messina ===
Inzoudine moved to Italy and joined Serie D club Messina in January 2018. He made nine appearances in Serie D for the club.

=== Cavese ===
In the summer 2018, Inzoudine moved to Serie C club Cavese with his manager from Messina, Giacomo Modica, who had been appointed new manager of Cavese. He made 15 appearances for Cavese, 13 of them in the Serie C, before the club announced on 31 January 2019, that his contract had been terminated by mutual consent.

=== Marsala ===
Having been without a club since January 2019, Inzoudine joined Serie D club Marsala on 17 December 2019.

=== Marina di Ragusa ===
After about seven months as a free agent, Inzoudine returned to the Italian Serie D by signing with ASD Marina di Ragusa in mid-February 2021.

=== Return to France ===
After three years in Italy, Inzoudine returned to France when he on 6 June 2021 signed with Championnat National 2 club Saint-Malo. On 5 June 2022 it was confirmed, that Inzoudine had signed with fellow league club Chambly.

=== Burton Albion and loan at Kalmar FF ===
On 20 July 2024, English League One club Burton Albion confirmed that they had bought Inzoudine, and he immediately moved to Swedish Allsvenskan club Kalmar FF on a loan until January 2025. However, Inzoudine only made four brief appearances and Kalmar confirmed in November 2024 that the full-back would return to Burton Albion ahead of 2025. Inzoudine's contract with Burton was terminated on 3 February 2025, with him not making a single appearance for the club.

== Career statistics ==
As of match played 10 November 2024

Appearances and goals by club, season and competition
Club	Season	League			National cup (Note: Includes Coupe de France, Coppa Italia, Svenska Cupen, FA Cup)		League cup (Note: Includes Coupe de la Ligue, EFL Cup)		Other		Total	
Club	Season	Division	Apps	Goals	Apps	Goals	Apps	Goals	Apps	Goals	Apps	Goals
Lens B	2014–15	Championnat de France Amateur	13	0	0	0	–		0	0	13	0
Lens B	2015–16	Championnat de France Amateur	16	0	0	0	–		0	0	16	0
Lens B	Total		29	0	0	0	–		0	0	29	0
Guingamp	2016–17	Ligue 1	0	0	0	0	0	0	0	0	0	0
Guingamp B	2016–17	Championnat de France Amateur 2	19	1	0	0	–		0	0	19	1
Guingamp B	2017–18	Championnat National 3	0	0	0	0	–		0	0	0	0
Guingamp B	Total		19	1	0	0	–		0	0	19	1
Messina	2017–18	Serie D	9	0	0	0	–		0	0	9	0
Cavese	2018–19	Serie C	13	0	0	0	–		0	0	13	0
Marsala	2019–20	Serie D	9	0	0	0	–		0	0	9	0
Marina di Ragusa	2020–21	Serie D	11	0	0	0	–		0	0	11	0
Saint-Malo	2021–22	Championnat National 2	25	1	2	1	–		0	0	27	2
Chambly	2022–23	Championnat National 2	15	0	1	0	–		0	0	16	0
Chambly	2023–24	Championnat National 2	19	0	2	0	–		0	0	21	0
Chambly	Total		36	0	3	0	–		0	0	39	0
Burton Albion	2024–25	EFL League One	0	0	0	0	0	0	0	0	0	0
Kalmar FF (loan)	2024	Allsvenskan	4	0	1	0	–		0	0	5	0
Career total			153	2	6	1	0	0	0	0	159	3
