= Charlie Webster (footballer) =

English footballer (born 2004)

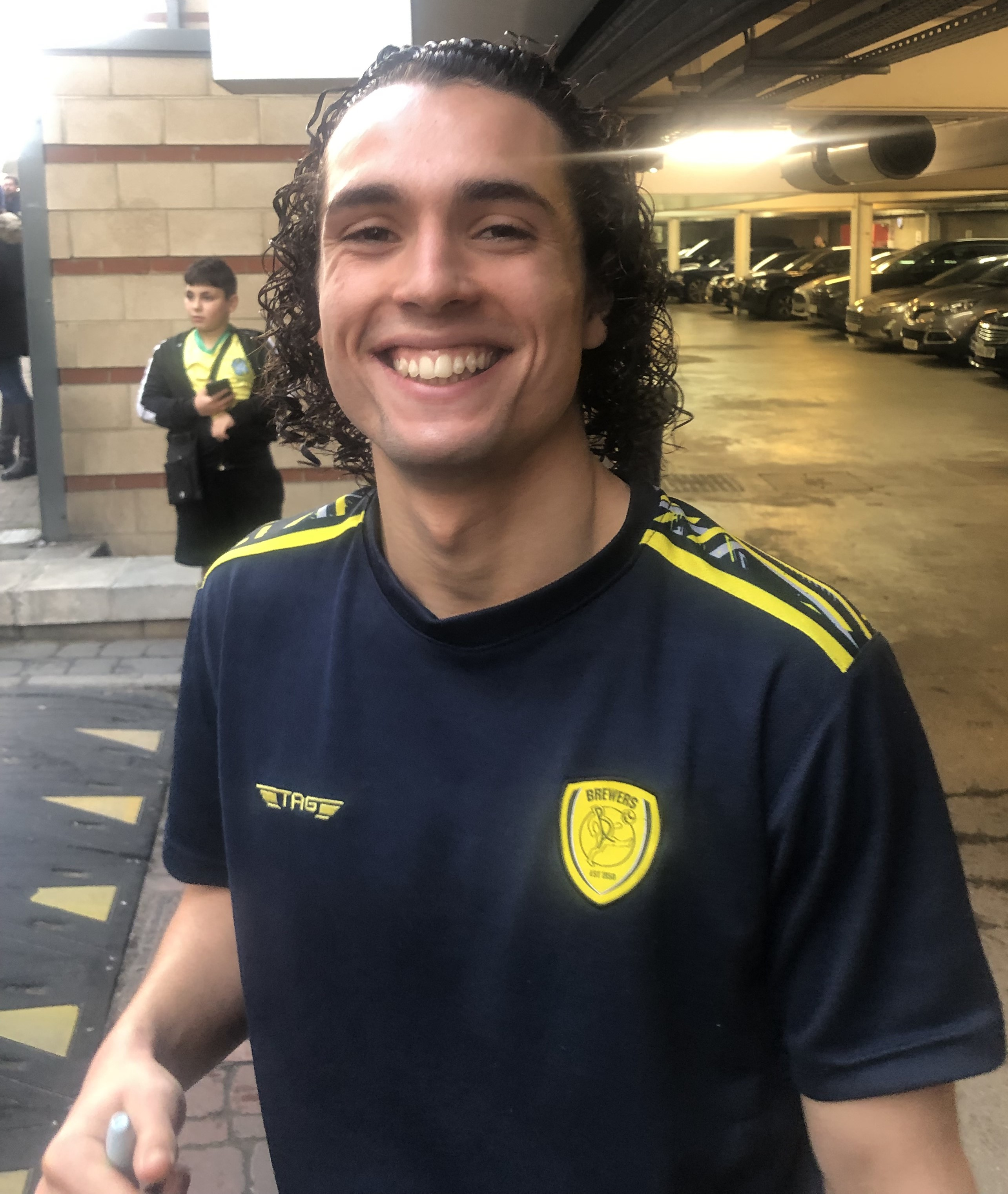
- Webster in 2024

Personal information
- Full name: Charles Clive Webster
- Date of birth: 31 January 2004 (age 22)
- Place of birth: Kingston upon Thames, England
- Height: 1.75 m (5 ft 9 in)
- Position: Midfielder

Team information
- Current team: Burton Albion
- Number: 8

Youth career
- Pezzaz Street Soccer
- 2013–2023: Chelsea

Senior career*
Years	Team	Apps	(Gls)
2023–2024	Chelsea	0	(0)
2023–2024	→ Heerenveen (loan)	13	(1)
2024–	Burton Albion	52	(10)

International career^{‡}
2019–2021	England U16	9	(1)
2021–2022	England U18	5	(0)
2021–2023	England U19	4	(1)
2023	England U20	3	(1)
- * Club domestic league appearances and goals as of 16 April 2026 ‡ National team caps and goals as of 15:07, 24 November 2023 (UTC)

Charles Clive Webster (born 31 January 2004) is an English professional footballer who plays as a midfielder for EFL League One club Burton Albion. Webster came through the Chelsea academy but never made a first team appearance.

== Early life ==
Born in Kingston upon Thames and raised in Broughton, Webster started his career at the Pezzaz Street Soccer academy, before joining Chelsea at under-10 level.

== Club career ==
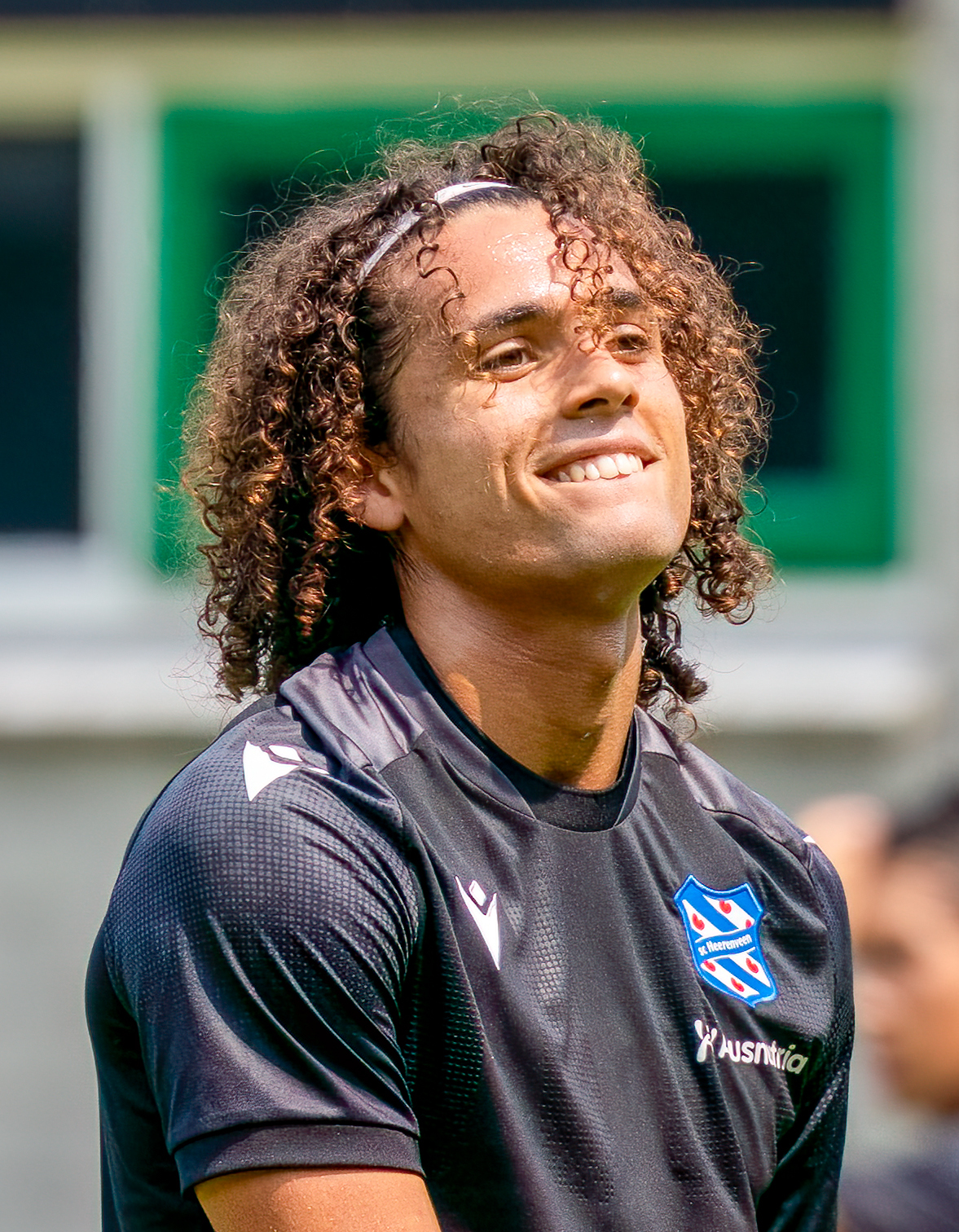
Webster with Heerenveen in 2023

Following good performances for Chelsea's youth teams, Webster was linked with a move to German side Borussia Dortmund in 2020. However, he signed a new contract with The Blues when he turned 17 in 2021.

He was included in The Guardian's "Next Generation" 2020 list, as one of the best young players emerging from Premier League sides.

At the age of 17, he was playing regularly for Chelsea's under-23 squad, and is seen as one of Chelsea's best young players.

Webster was handed a place on the bench for the Chelsea senior team for the first time in their 2–0 EFL Cup victory to Brentford on 22 December 2021. In January 2023, Webster signed a new contract with Chelsea, extending his deal until the summer of 2024.

On 30 June 2023, Webster agreed to join Eredivisie side, Heerenveen on a season-long loan. He scored his first goal for the club in his second match before he was sent off with a red card later in the game. The game against Go Ahead Eagles was lost 3–2.

On 21 June 2024, Webster signed a three-year contract with League One side Burton Albion on a permanent deal.

== International career ==
Webster has represented England at under-16 level.

On 7 October 2021, Webster made his debut for the England U18s as a substitute during a 2–1 defeat to Norway in Marbella.

On 16 November 2021, Webster made his debut for the England U19s in a 2–0 victory over Sweden in a 2022 UEFA European Under-19 Championship qualification match.

On 12 October 2023, Webster made his England U20 debut during a 2–0 away defeat to Romania.

== Career statistics ==
=== Club ===
As of 3 May 2025

Appearances and goals by club, season and competition
Club	Season	League			National cup		League cup		Europe		Other		Total	
Club	Season	Division	Apps	Goals	Apps	Goals	Apps	Goals	Apps	Goals	Apps	Goals	Apps	Goals
Chelsea U23	2021–22	—			—		—		—		2 (Note: Appearances in the EFL Trophy)	0	2	0
Chelsea U23	2022–23	—			—		—		—		2	0	2	0
Chelsea U23	Total		—		—		—		—		4	0	4	0
Chelsea	2023–24	Premier League	0	0	0	0	0	0	—		—		0	0
Heerenveen (loan)	2023–24	Eredivisie	13	1	0	0	—		—		—		13	1
Burton Albion	2024–25	League One	32	5	1	0	0	0	0	0	2	1	35	6
Career total			45	6	1	0	0	0	0	0	6	1	52	7
