= Julian Larsson =

Swedish footballer (born 2001)

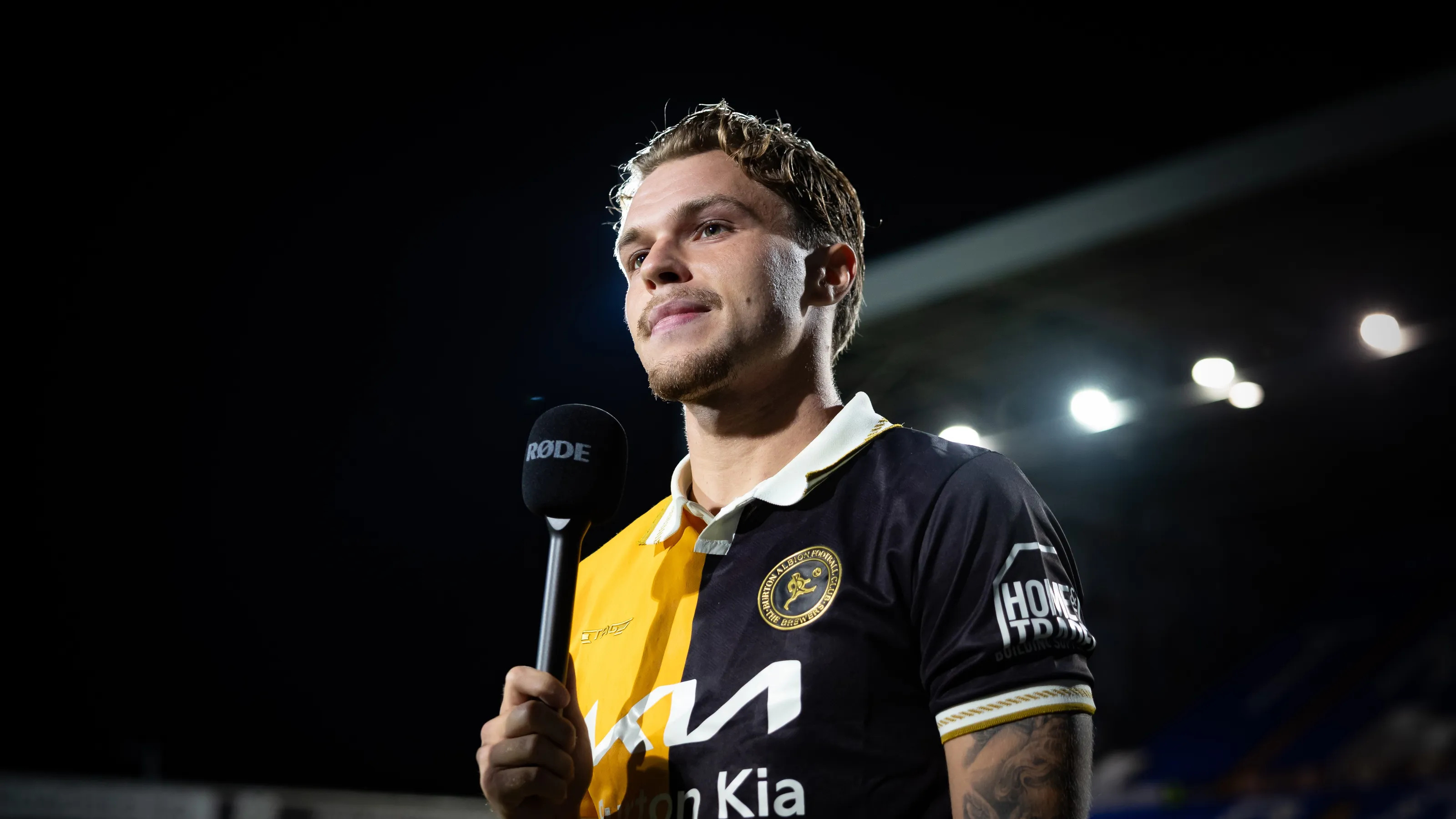
- Larsson with Burton Albion.

Personal information
- Full name: Julian Hunter Larsson
- Date of birth: 21 April 2001 (age 25)
- Position: Forward

Team information
- Current team: Helsingborg
- Number: 21

Youth career
- AIK
- 2020–2023: Nottingham Forest

Senior career*
Years	Team	Apps	(Gls)
2023–2024	Nottingham Forest	0	(0)
2024	→ Morecambe (loan)	13	(0)
2024–2026	Burton Albion	31	(2)
2026–	Helsingborg	16	(1)

International career
2017–2018	Sweden U17	8	(3)
2019–2021	Sweden U19	9	(0)
- * Club domestic league appearances and goals as of 12 November 2026

Julian Hunter Larsson (born 21 April 2001) is a Swedish professional footballer who plays as a forward for Helsingborg.

== Club career ==
After playing for AIK, Larsson signed for English club Nottingham Forest in January 2020. In April 2022, Larsson signed a deal with Forest to keep him at the club until the summer of 2025. Larsson moved on loan to Morecambe in February 2024. He made his professional debut on 3 February 2024, starting in a 2–1 win over Crawley Town.

In June 2024 he signed for Burton Albion for an undisclosed fee. In June 2026 he returned to Sweden, signing with Helsingborg.

== International career ==
Larsson was a Swedish youth international, playing for them at the U17 European Championships. He also represented Sweden at under-19 level.

== Career statistics ==
As of match played 6 April 2026

Appearances and goals by club, season and competition
Club	Season	League			FA Cup		League Cup		Other		Total	
Club	Season	Division	Apps	Goals	Apps	Goals	Apps	Goals	Apps	Goals	Apps	Goals
Nottingham Forest	2023–24	Premier League	0	0	0	0	0	0	0	0	0	0
Morecambe (loan)	2023–24	League Two	13	0	0	0	0	0	0	0	13	0
Burton Albion	2024–25	League One	11	2	1	0	0	0	2 (Note: Appearance(s) in the EFL Trophy.)	0	14	2
Burton Albion	2025–26	League One	20	0	3	0	2	0	2	1	27	1
Burton Albion	Total		31	2	4	0	2	0	4	1	41	3
Career total			44	2	4	0	1	0	4	1	54	3
