= Terence Vancooten =

Association football player

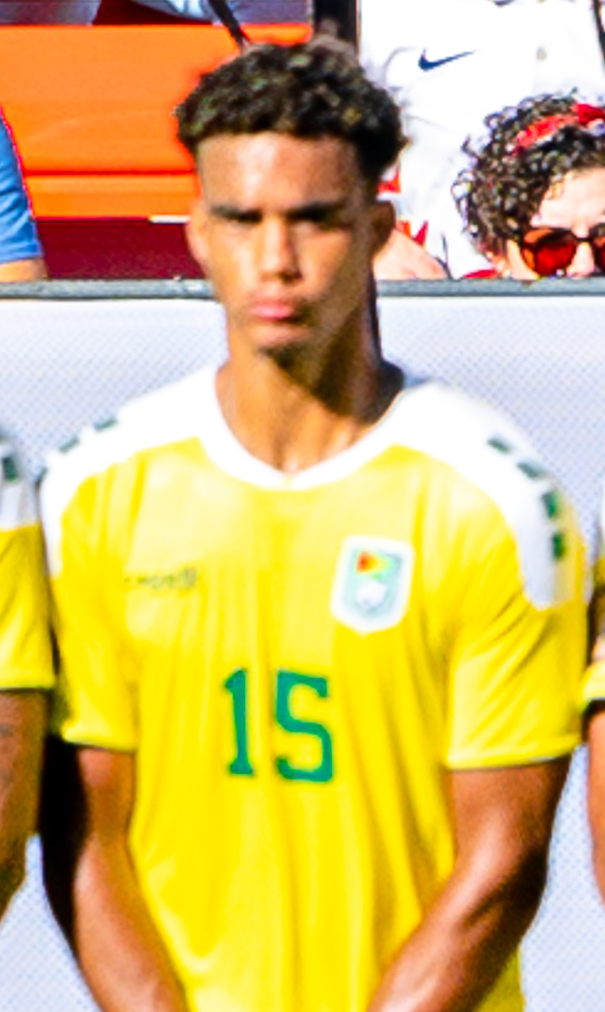
- Vancooten with Guyana at the 2019 CONCACAF Gold Cup

Personal information
- Full name: Terence Owen Vancooten
- Date of birth: 29 December 1997 (age 28)
- Place of birth: Kingston upon Thames, England
- Height: 6 ft 4 in (1.93 m)
- Position: Defender

Team information
- Current team: Stevenage
- Number: 15

Youth career
- 2013: Hampton & Richmond Borough
- 2013–2014: Leatherhead
- 2014: Brentford
- 2014–2015: Staines Town

Senior career*
| Years | Team | Apps | (Gls) |
| 2015–2016 | Staines Town | 9 | (0) |
| 2016–2017 | Reading | 0 | (0) |
| 2016 | → Billericay Town (loan) | 5 | (0) |
| 2017 | → Basingstoke Town (loan) | 9 | (0) |
| 2017–2024 | Stevenage | 176 | (2) |
| 2024–2026 | Burton Albion | 50 | (2) |
| 2026– | Stevenage | 5 | (1) |

International career^{‡}
| 2017– | Guyana | 21 | (1) |
- * Club domestic league appearances and goals as of 18:11, 6 September 2026 (UTC) ‡ National team caps and goals as of 23:36, 10 July 2025 (UTC)

Terence Owen Vancooten (born 29 December 1997) is a professional footballer who plays as a defender for EFL League One club Stevenage. Born in England, he represents the Guyana national team.

Following youth spells at four clubs, Vancooten joined Staines Town in 2014 and established himself in the first team during the 2015–16 season. He signed for Championship club Reading in the summer of 2016, during which he spent time on loan at Billericay Town and Basingstoke Town. In July 2017, he signed for Stevenage and helped the club achieve promotion to League One during the 2022–23 season. Vancooten made 214 appearances during his seven years at Stevenage before signing for Burton Albion for an undisclosed fee in July 2024. After two years at Burton, he rejoined Stevenage in July 2026.

== Early life ==
Born in Kingston upon Thames, England, Vancooten is of Guyanese descent. He attended Christ's School in Richmond, London.

== Club career ==
=== Early career ===
Vancooten began his career at Hampton & Richmond Borough, before joining Leatherhead's youth system, competing in the West Surrey Under-16 League. He was scouted by Brentford while at Leatherhead, and joined the west London club in 2014 following a successful trial. After a brief spell at Brentford, he joined Staines Town at academy level, where he also represented the Middlesex FA. He played regularly in the club's academy and subsequently began to play for the first team during the 2015–16 season, making 10 appearances in all competitions.

He signed for Championship club Reading ahead of the 2016–17 season, and was assigned to the club's under-23 development squad for the season. After making three appearances for the under-23 team, Vancooten joined Billericay Town on loan in November 2016 for the remainder of the year. He made five appearances during his time at Billericay before returning to his parent club. Vancooten was loaned out once again on 25 February 2017, this time joining Southern League Premier Division club Basingstoke Town for the remainder of the 2016–17 season. He made nine appearances for Basingstoke. At the end of the season, Vancooten was released by Reading.

=== Stevenage ===
Following his release from Reading, Vancooten spent several weeks on trial at League Two club Stevenage, featuring in all of the club's early pre-season fixtures. The trial proved successful, and he signed a one-year contract, with the option for a further year, on 18 July 2017. Upon joining the club, Vancooten stated he was eager to develop as a player and felt confident Stevenage was the right environment for his growth. He made his professional Football League debut on 26 August 2017, coming on as an 83rd-minute substitute in a 1–0 away victory at local rivals Barnet. After establishing himself in the first team over the following two months, Vancooten signed an "improved and extended" contract in October 2017. He made 24 appearances during the 2017–18 season.

Vancooten played just nine times during the first half of the 2018–19 season. After over three months out of the first team, he returned to the starting line-up for Stevenage's 2–0 victory at Grimsby Town on 6 April 2019 and went on to play every minute of the club's last six matches of the season, of which they won five and drew one. Stevenage ultimately finished in 10th position, missing out on the play-offs by one point. He made 15 appearances that season, and was recognised with a PFA Community award in April 2019 for his contribution to the local community in Stevenage. He signed a new contract with Stevenage on 13 August 2019, with the agreement running until 2022. Vancooten made 20 appearances during the 2019–20 season before it was curtailed in March 2020 due to the COVID-19 pandemic. Vancooten played a further 33 times throughout the 2020–21 season as Stevenage finished 14th in League Two. He signed a further two-year contract extension with Stevenage on 5 August 2021.

Vancooten scored his first goal in senior club football in Stevenage's 3–0 victory against Wycombe Wanderers in the EFL Trophy on 20 September 2022. A regular in central defence under manager Steve Evans during the first half of the 2022–23 season, Vancooten sustained a hamstring injury during Stevenage's FA Cup fourth round tie against Stoke City on 21 January 2023, restricting him to three further appearances throughout the remainder of the season. He returned to the first team in April 2023 and made 38 appearances in all competitions that season as Stevenage earned promotion into League One after finishing in second place in League Two. Out of contract at the end of the 2022–23 season, Vancooten signed a new two-year contract extension with the club on 15 June 2023. He made 38 appearances and scored twice during the 2023–24 season. At the end of the season, Stevenage chairman Phil Wallace stated that Vancooten had rejected an improved contract offer and indicated his intention to leave upon the expiry of his deal. Vancooten made 214 appearances during his seven years at the club.

=== Burton Albion ===
Vancooten signed for League One club Burton Albion for a "significant undisclosed fee" on 25 July 2024. He made his debut for Burton in the club's opening match of the 2024–25 season, a 3–2 home defeat to Lincoln City. Vancooten was sent off three times during the season, including against former club Stevenage in a 1–0 victory. He scored his first goal for the club in a 2–0 away victory at Shrewsbury Town on 15 March 2025. Following that match, he did not feature again, with manager Gary Bowyer stating he sustained an injury that would keep him out for the remainder of the season. Vancooten made 34 appearances and scored once in his debut season as Burton avoided relegation following an improved second half of the season. After reopening the wound that ended his previous season, Vancooten missed the opening three months of the 2025–26 campaign. He returned in November 2025 and made 23 appearances that season, scoring once.

=== Return to Stevenage ===
Vancooten rejoined Stevenage for an undisclosed fee on 25 July 2026, signing a two-year contract with an option for a further year.

== International career ==
In October 2017, Vancooten was called up to play for Guyana in a friendly away at Grenada. He started the match, on 7 October 2017, which ended in a 1–0 defeat. Vancooten was named in Guyana's 23-man squad for the 2019 CONCACAF Gold Cup, the country's first appearance at a major international tournament, and featured in all three group stage matches as Guyana finished third in their group. Vancooten scored his first international goal, and first in senior football, in a 4–0 home victory over Bahamas during a 2022 FIFA World Cup qualifier on 30 March 2021.

== Style of play ==
Vancooten has played in every position across the defence. Initially deployed as a defensive midfielder in the early stages of his career, he has later been utilised as a defender. This firstly involved playing as a full-back, before playing regularly as a centre-back for Stevenage. Vancooten's speed and composure on the ball have been highlighted as key attributes, with a noted tendency to carry the ball out from defence.

== Career statistics ==
=== Club ===
As of match played 5 September 2026

Appearances and goals by club, season and competition
| Club | Season | League | | | FA Cup | | EFL Cup | | Other | | Total | |
| Club | Season | Division | Apps | Goals | Apps | Goals | Apps | Goals | Apps | Goals | Apps | Goals |
|---|---|---|---|---|---|---|---|---|---|---|---|---|
| Staines Town | 2015–16 | Isthmian League Premier Division | 9 | 0 | 1 | 0 | — | | 0 | 0 | 10 | 0 |
| Reading | 2016–17 | Championship | 0 | 0 | 0 | 0 | — | | 0 | 0 | 0 | 0 |
| Billericay Town (loan) | 2016–17 | Isthmian League Premier Division | 5 | 0 | 0 | 0 | — | | 0 | 0 | 5 | 0 |
| Basingstoke Town (loan) | 2016–17 | Southern League Premier Division | 9 | 0 | 0 | 0 | — | | 0 | 0 | 9 | 0 |
| Stevenage | 2017–18 | League Two | 22 | 0 | 0 | 0 | 0 | 0 | 2 (Note: Appearance(s) in EFL Trophy) | 0 | 24 | 0 |
| Stevenage | 2018–19 | League Two | 12 | 0 | 0 | 0 | 0 | 0 | 3 | 0 | 15 | 0 |
| Stevenage | 2019–20 | League Two | 16 | 0 | 1 | 0 | 1 | 0 | 2 | 0 | 20 | 0 |
| Stevenage | 2020–21 | League Two | 29 | 0 | 2 | 0 | 0 | 0 | 2 | 0 | 33 | 0 |
| Stevenage | 2021–22 | League Two | 38 | 0 | 3 | 0 | 2 | 0 | 3 | 0 | 46 | 0 |
| Stevenage | 2022–23 | League Two | 27 | 0 | 4 | 0 | 3 | 0 | 4 | 1 | 38 | 1 |
| Stevenage | 2023–24 | League One | 32 | 2 | 4 | 0 | 0 | 0 | 2 | 0 | 38 | 2 |
| Stevenage | Total | | 176 | 2 | 14 | 0 | 6 | 0 | 18 | 1 | 214 | 3 |
| Burton Albion | 2024–25 | League One | 30 | 1 | 2 | 0 | 1 | 0 | 1 | 0 | 34 | 1 |
| Burton Albion | 2025–26 | League One | 20 | 1 | 3 | 0 | 0 | 0 | 0 | 0 | 23 | 1 |
| Burton Albion | Total | | 50 | 2 | 5 | 0 | 1 | 0 | 1 | 0 | 57 | 2 |
| Stevenage | 2026–27 | League One | 5 | 1 | 0 | 0 | 2 | 0 | 0 | 0 | 7 | 1 |
| Career total | | | 254 | 5 | 20 | 0 | 9 | 0 | 19 | 1 | 302 | 6 |

=== International ===
Appearances and goals by national team and year
| National team | Year | Apps | Goals |
|---|---|---|---|
| Guyana | 2017 | 2 | 0 |
| Guyana | 2018 | 1 | 0 |
| Guyana | 2019 | 8 | 0 |
| Guyana | 2021 | 5 | 1 |
| Guyana | 2024 | 5 | 0 |
| Total | | 21 | 1 |

== Honours ==
Stevenage

- EFL League Two runner-up: 2022–23
