= Tomas Kalinauskas =

Lithuanian footballer (born 2000)

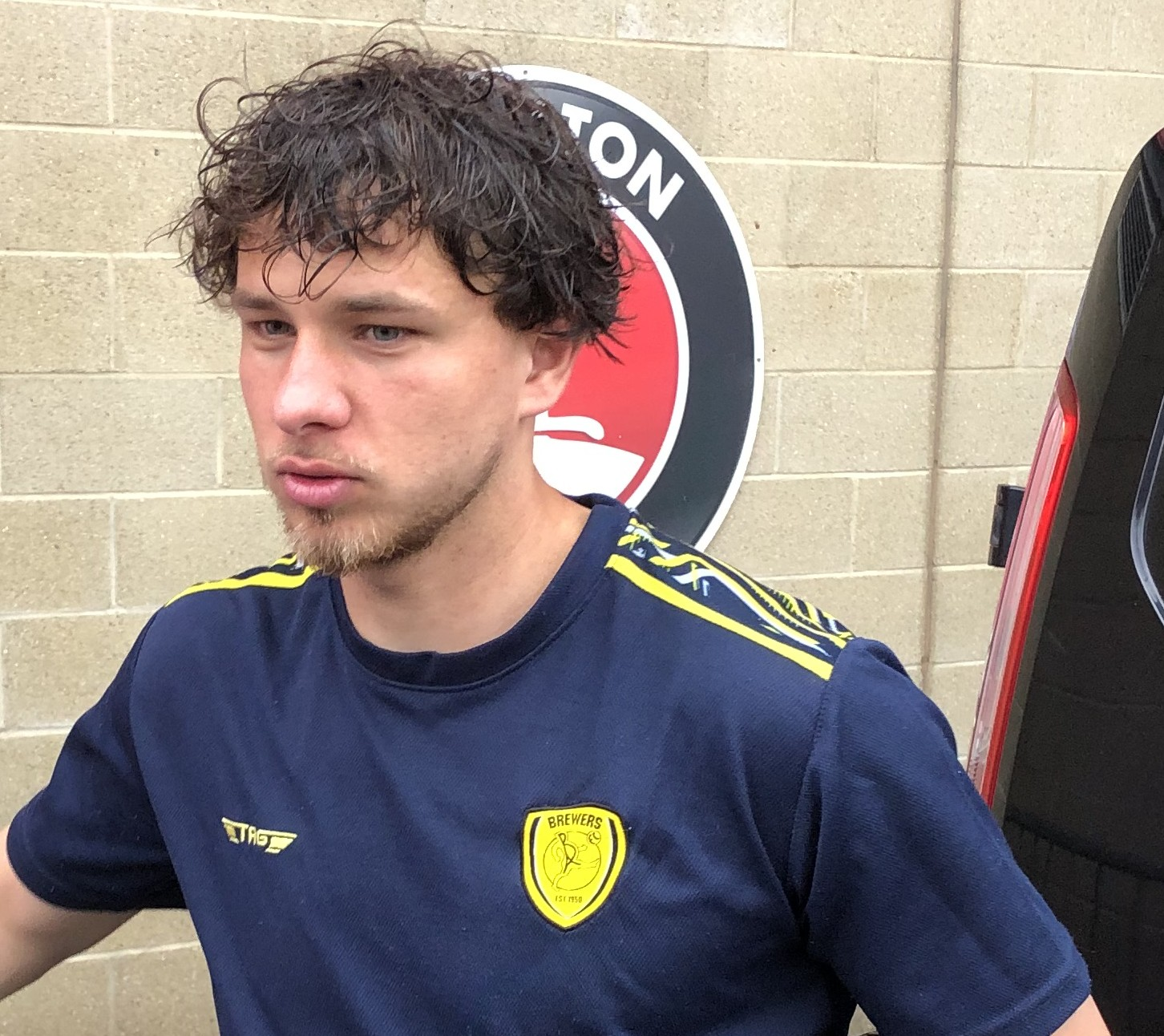
- Kalinauskas in 2025 with Burton Albion

Personal information
- Full name: Tomas Kalinauskas
- Date of birth: 27 April 2000 (age 26)
- Place of birth: Marijampolė, Lithuania
- Height: 1.78 m (5 ft 10 in)
- Position: Attacking midfielder

Youth career
- 2014–2019: Conquest Football Academy

Senior career*
Years	Team	Apps	(Gls)
2019–2020	Windsor	10	(5)
2020	Hayes & Yeading United	0	(0)
2020	Farnborough	1	(0)
2021–2023	Barnsley	0	(0)
2022	→ AFC Wimbledon (loan)	2	(0)
2022	→ Havant & Waterlooville (loan)	5	(1)
2023–2024	Den Bosch	33	(1)
2024–2026	Burton Albion	40	(1)
2025	→ Kalmar FF (loan)	14	(5)
2026	→ Roda JC Kerkrade (loan)	8	(2)

International career^{‡}
2018–2019	Lithuania U19	3	(0)
2021–2022	Lithuania U21	8	(1)
2022–	Lithuania	6	(0)
- * Club domestic league appearances and goals as of 25 April 2026 ‡ National team caps and goals as of 4 September 2025 (UTC)

Tomas Kalinauskas (born 27 April 2000) is a Lithuanian professional footballer who plays as an attacking midfielder for the Lithuania national team.

== Club career ==
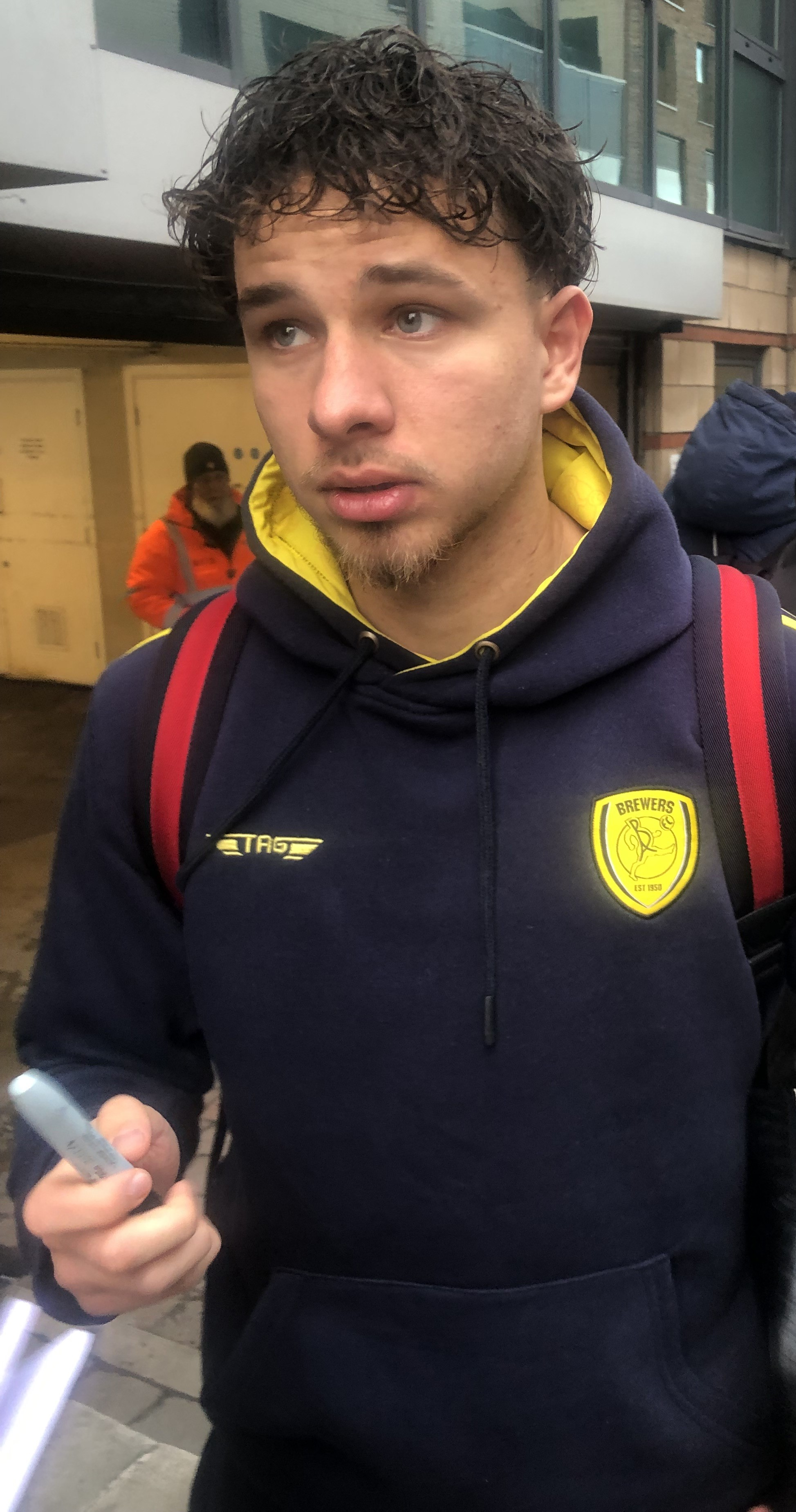
Kalinauskas in 2024 with Burton Albion

Kalinauskas spent seven years with the Conquest Football Academy in London before turning professional in July 2021 with Barnsley. He also spent time in non-league football alongside his time at Conquest, playing with Windsor, Hayes & Yeading United and Farnborough. He moved on loan to AFC Wimbledon in January 2022, and on loan to Havant & Waterlooville in August 2022.

On 17 January 2023, he signed for Dutch Eerste Divisie club FC Den Bosch.

On 13 June 2024, Kalinauskas returned to England to join League One club Burton Albion on a three-year contract. On 31 July 2025, Kalinauskas joined Superettan side Kalmar FF on loan until the end of the season.

On 4 February 2026, Kalinauskas moved on loan to Roda JC.

He left Burton by mutual consent in September 2026.

== International career ==
Kalinauskas is a Lithuanian youth international, representing them at under-19 and under-21 levels.

He made his debut for the Lithuania national football team on 25 September 2022 in a Nations League game against Luxembourg.

== Personal life ==
Kalinauskas was born in Marijampolė before moving to west London with his mother and brother at the age of 8.

== Career statistics ==
=== Club ===
As of 21 March 2026

Appearances and goals by club, season and competition
Club	Season	League			National cup (Note: Includes FA Cup)		League cup (Note: Includes EFL Cup)		Other		Total	
Club	Season	Division	Apps	Goals	Apps	Goals	Apps	Goals	Apps	Goals	Apps	Goals
Windsor	2019–20	Hellenic League Premier Division	10	5	—		—		1 (Note: Appearance in Hellenic League Floodlit Challenge Cup)	0	11	5
Hayes & Yeading United	2020–21	Southern League Premier Division South	0	0	1	0	—		0	0	1	0
Farnborough	2020–21	Southern League Premier Division South	1	0	—		—		1 (Note: Appearance in FA Trophy)	0	2	0
Barnsley	2021–22	Championship	0	0	0	0	0	0	—		0	0
Barnsley	2022–23	League One	0	0	0	0	0	0	0	0	0	0
Barnsley	Total		0	0	0	0	0	0	0	0	0	0
AFC Wimbledon (loan)	2021–22	League One	2	0	0	0	0	0	0	0	2	0
Havant & Waterlooville (loan)	2022–23	National League South	5	1	3	1	—		0	0	8	2
Den Bosch	2022–23	Eerste Divisie	17	1	0	0	—		—		17	1
Den Bosch	2023–24	Eerste Divisie	16	0	0	0	—		—		16	0
Den Bosch	Total		33	1	0	0	0	0	0	0	33	1
Burton Albion	2024–25	League One	39	1	2	1	1	0	1 (Note: Appearance in EFL Trophy)	0	43	2
Burton Albion	2025–26	League One	1	0	0	0	0	0	0	0	1	0
Burton Albion	Total		40	1	2	1	1	0	1	0	44	2
Kalmar FF (loan)	2025	Superettan	14	5	0	0	0	0	0	0	14	5
Roda JC Kerkrade (loan)	2025–26	Eerste Divisie	7	2	0	0	0	0	0	0	7	2
Career total			112	15	6	2	1	0	3	0	123	17

=== International ===
As of match played 4 September 2025

Appearances and goals by national team and year
National team	Year	Apps	Goals
Lithuania
Lithuania	2023	2	0
Lithuania	2024	3	0
Lithuania	2025	1	0
Total		6	0
