= Jack Cooper-Love =

Swedish footballer (born 2001)

Jack Cooper Love
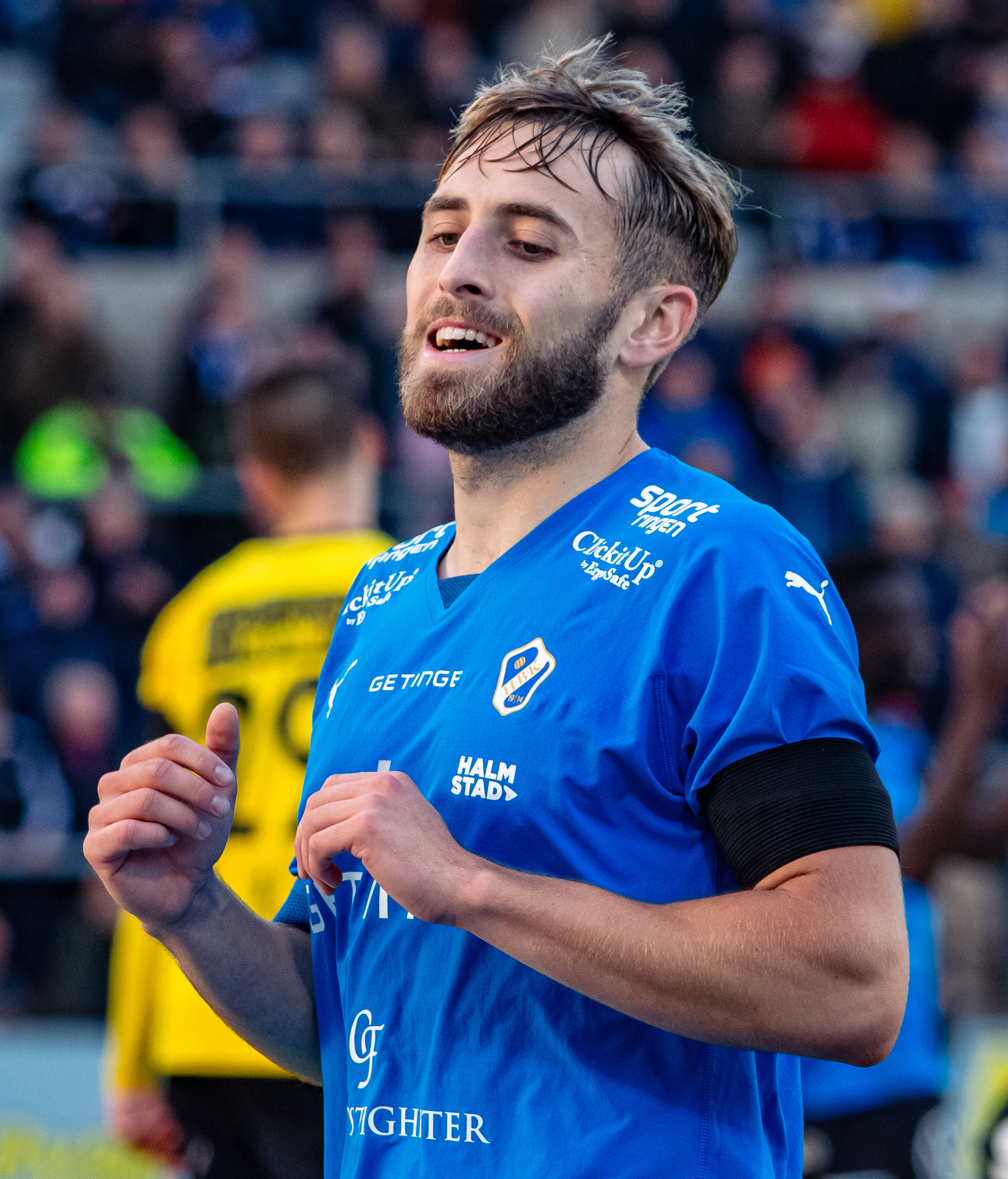

Personal information
- Date of birth: 25 December 2001 (age 24)
- Place of birth: Aneby, Sweden
- Height: 1.83 m (6 ft 0 in)
- Position: Forward

Team information
- Current team: Emmen
- Number: 9

Youth career
- –2017: Aneby SK
- 2017–2021: Elfsborg

Senior career*
Years	Team	Apps	(Gls)
2016–2017	Aneby SK	21	(10)
2021–2024	Elfsborg	19	(1)
2021	→ Örgryte (loan)	9	(0)
2022	→ Skövde AIK (loan)	27	(14)
2023	→ Halmstads BK (loan)	16	(2)
2024	→ GAIS (loan)	9	(4)
2024–2026	Burton Albion	14	(2)
2025	→ De Graafschap (loan)	10	(5)
2025–2026	→ Roda JC (loan)	34	(7)
2026–	Emmen	0	(0)
- * Club domestic league appearances and goals as of 25 April 2026

Jack Cooper Love (born 25 December 2001) is a Swedish professional footballer who plays as a forward for Eerste Divisie club Emmen.

== Club career ==
Cooper Love started his career with Aneby SK, playing for their senior side in Division 4 during 2016 and 2017. In 2017, he joined Elfsborg, making his senior debut for the club in February 2021 as a substitute in the Svenska Cupen. Two months later, he made his Allsvenskan debut, appearing as a late substitute in a 3–1 win over Varbergs BoIS. On 13 September 2021, Cooper Love signed a new contract with Elfsborg and subsequently joined Superettan side Örgryte on loan for the rest of the season.

On 24 February 2022, Cooper Love returned to Superettan and joined Skövde AIK.

In July 2023, Cooper Love joined Allsvenskan side Halmstads BK on loan until the end of the season.

In January 2024, Cooper Love joined newly-promoted Allsvenskan side GAIS on a season-long loan deal.

On 16 July 2024, Cooper Love signed for League One club Burton Albion on a three-year deal.

On 5 February 2025, Cooper Love joined Eerste Divisie side De Graafschap on loan until the end of the season.

In August 2025, Cooper Love returned on loan to the Eerste Divisie, this time joining Roda JC with an option to buy.

For the 2026–27 season, Cooper Love remained in the same league, signing a two-season contract with Emmen.

== Personal life ==
Cooper Love was born in Sweden to English parents from Bury.

== Honours ==
Individual

- Superettan Young Player of the Year: 2022
