= List of Burton Albion F.C. records and statistics =

Burton Albion Football Club are a professional football club from Burton Upon Trent, Staffordshire. They were formed in 1950. They turned professional in 1950. In early 1950 they were elected into the Birmingham & District League where they remained until the end of the 1957-58 season. In the 1958-59 they moved into the Southern League. Before the 1979-80 they joined the Northern Premier League and in the 1987-88 they re-joined the Southern League. For the 2000-01 season they joined they re-joined the Northern Premier League then they joined the Football Conference and in the 2008-09 season they earned promotion to the Football League Two.

== Honours and achievements ==
- Football League One (Level 3)
  - Runners-Up: 2015-16
- Football League Two (Level 4)
  - Winners (1): 2014-15
- Football Conference (Level 5)
  - Winners (1): 2008-09
- Northern Premier League (Level 6)
  - Winners (1): 2001-02
- Southern League Premier Division (Level 6)
  - Runners-Up (2): 1999-2000, 2000–01
- FA Trophy
  - Runners-Up (1): 1986-87
- Southern League Cup
  - Winners (3): 1963-64, 1996–97, 1999–2000
  - Runners-Up (1): 1988-89
- Northern Premier League Challenge Cup
  - Winners (1): 1982-83
  - Runners-Up (1): 1986-87
- Northern League President's Cup
  - Runners-Up (2): 1982-83, 1985–86
- Staffordshire Senior Cup
  - Winners (1): 1955-56
  - Runners-Up (1): 1976-77
- Birmingham Senior Cup
  - Winners (2): 1953-54, 1996–97
  - Runners-Up (4): 1969-70, 1970–71, 1986–87, 2007–08
- Bass Charity Vase
  - Winners (15): 1954, 1961, 1970, 1971, 1981, 1986, 1997, 2006, 2007, 2008, 2009, 2011, 2013, 2014, 2016
  - Runners-Up (12): 1952, 1957, 1973, 1980, 1982, 1983, 1984, 2002, 2003, 2004, 2005, 2010

== Player records ==
=== Appearances ===
#	Name	Career	Apps	Goals	Source
1	(England) Darren Stride	1993–2010	646	124	
2	(England) Aaron Webster	1998–2013	588	100	
3	(England) Phil Annable	1970–80, 1981–83	567	70	
4	(England) Nigel Simms	1981-93	535	11	
5	(England) Nick Goodwin	1988-95, 1997–99	508	0	

== Goalscorers ==
=== Top Goalscorers ===
#	Name	Career	Goals	Apps	Average	Source
1	(England) Richie Barker	1960-62, 1963–67	159	270	0.58	
2	(England) Stan Round	1963-67	149	199	0.75	
3	(England) Darren Stride	1993–2010	124	646	0.19	
4	(England) Aaron Webster	1998–2013	101	588	0.17	
5	(England) Simon Redfern	1987-97	86	457	0.19	

== Managerial Records ==
- First Manager: Reg Weston managed club for 338 games, from June 1950 to July 1957
- Longest serving Manager: Nigel Clough managed club for 742 games, from October 1998 to January 2009 and since December 2015. At total of 11 years.

== Club Records ==
=== Matches ===
- First Football League match: Shrewsbury Town 3–1 Burton Albion, 8 August 2009
- First League Cup match: Reading 5–1 Burton Albion, 11 August 2009
- First Football League Trophy match: Burton Albion 1–5 Chesterfield, 1 September 2009
- First match at Pirelli Stadium: Burton Albion 2–2 Chester City, 16 July 2005

=== Record wins ===
- Record win: 12–1 v Coalville Town, Birmingham Senior Cup, 6 September 1954
- Record Football League win: 6–1 v Aldershot Town, Football League Two, 12 December 2009
- Record FA Cup win: 6–0 v St Albans City, 1 November 2025
- Record League Cup win: 4–0 v Morcambe, 27 August 2019
- Record EFL Trophy win: 5–0 vs. Wycombe Wanderers, 9 November 2021

=== Record defeats ===
- Record defeat: 0–10 v Barnet, Southern League Premier Division, 7 February 1970
- Record Football League defeat:

1–7 v Bristol Rovers, Football League Two, 14 April 2012
1–7 v Port Vale, Football League Two, 5 April 2012
0–6 v Fulham, Championship, 20 January 2018

- Record FA Cup:

0–7 v Charlton Athletic, 1952

- Record League Cup:

0–9 v Manchester City, 9 January 2019
