= 2025–26 Burton Albion F.C. season =

76th season in existence of Burton Albion FC

Burton Albion
2025–26 season
- Owner: Nordic Football Group
- Chairman: Wouter Gudde (Interim)
- Manager: Gary Bowyer
- Stadium: Pirelli Stadium
- League One: 17th
- FA Cup: Fourth round (Eliminated by West Ham United)
- EFL Cup: Second round (Eliminated by Lincoln City)
- EFL Trophy: Group stage
- Top goalscorer: League: Jake Beesley (13); All: Tyrese Shade (14)
- Highest home attendance: 6,514 v West Ham United (14 Feb 2026, FA Cup)
- Lowest home attendance: 791 v Crewe Alexandra (11 Nov 2025, EFL Trophy)
- Average home league attendance: 3,995
- Biggest win: 6–0 v St Albans City (Home, 1 Nov 2025, FA Cup)
- Biggest defeat: 0–4 v Plymouth Argyle (Home, 27 Sept 2025, League One); 0–4 v Leyton Orient (Home, 29 Nov 2025, League One)
Home colours	Away colours	Third colours

The 2025–26 season was the 76th season in the history of Burton Albion Football Club and their eighth consecutive season in League One. In addition to the domestic league, the club also participated in the FA Cup, the EFL Cup, and the EFL Trophy.

== Transfers and contracts ==
=== In ===
Date	Pos.	Player	From	Fee	Ref.
25 June 2025	CF	(England) Jake Beesley	(England) Blackpool	Undisclosed	
30 June 2025	GK	(Germany) Jordan Amissah	(Scotland) Ross County	Undisclosed	
1 July 2025 (Note: The transfer was announced on 21 May, but would become official on July 1 once his contract at Coventry had ended)	CF	(Portugal) Fábio Tavares	(England) Coventry City	Free	
1 July 2025 (Note: The transfer was announced on 2 May, but would become official on July 1 once his contract at Chelsea had ended)	LB	(England) Dylan Williams	(England) Chelsea	Free	
10 July 2025	CB	(Uganda) Toby Sibbick	(England) Wigan Athletic	Undisclosed	
25 July 2025	RB	(England) Kyran Lofthouse	(England) Barnsley	Undisclosed	
30 July 2025	RW	(Saint Kitts and Nevis) Tyrese Shade	(England) Eastleigh	Undisclosed	
1 September 2025	CDM	(England) George Evans	(England) Wrexham	Free	
1 September 2025	CB	(England) Alex Hartridge	(England) Wycombe Wanderers	Undisclosed	
9 January 2026	RW	(England) Kain Adom	(England) Gateshead	Undisclosed	
2 February 2026	CF	(England) Millar Matthews-Lewis	(England) Hemel Hempstead Town	Undisclosed	

=== Out ===
Date	Pos.	Player	To	Fee	Ref.
26 July 2025	CF	(Jamaica) Rumarn Burrell	(England) Queens Park Rangers	Undisclosed	
30 July 2025	CF	(England) Danilo Orsi	(England) AFC Wimbledon	Undisclosed	

=== Loaned in ===
Date	Pos.	Player	From	Date until	Ref.
23 June 2025	CM	(Northern Ireland) JJ McKiernan	(England) Lincoln City	31 May 2026	
13 August 2025	LB	(England) Sebastian Revan	(Wales) Wrexham	31 May 2026	
29 August 2025	GK	(England) Bradley Collins	(England) Coventry City	31 May 2026	
26 January 2026	CM	(England) Andy Cannon	(Wales) Wrexham	31 May 2026	

=== Loaned out ===
Date	Pos.	Player	To	Date until	Ref.
2 July 2025	CB	(Scotland) Alex Bannon	(Republic of Ireland) Derry City	30 June 2026	
31 July 2025	LW	(Lithuania) Tomas Kalinauskas	(Sweden) Kalmar	30 November 2025	
2 August 2025	CF	(Sweden) Jack Cooper-Love	(Netherlands) Roda JC Kerkrade	31 May 2026	
22 August 2025	CB	(Albania) Geraldo Bajrami	(England) Crawley Town	31 May 2026	
17 October 2025	CM	(Republic of Ireland) Ciaran Gilligan	(England) Aldershot Town	31 May 2026	
31 January 2026	CF	(England) Jack Newall	(England) Stourbridge	28 February 2026	
3 February 2026	CF	(England) Zac Scutt	(England) Spennymoor Town	3 March 2026	
4 February 2026	LW	(Lithuania) Tomas Kalinauskas	(Netherlands) Roda JC	31 May 2026	
13 February 2026	LB	(England) Josh Taroni	(England) Spalding United	31 May 2026	
20 February 2026	CB	(England) Bodi Thistleton	(England) Kettering Town	20 March 2026	
13 March 2026	CF	(England) Millar Matthews-Lewis	(England) Yeovil Town	31 May 2026	
23 March 2026	CF	(England) Jack Newall	(England) Alfreton Town	31 May 2026	

=== Released / Out of Contract ===
Date	Pos.	Player	Subsequent club	Join date	Ref.
30 June 2025	LW	(England) Mason Bennett	(England) Harrogate Town	1 July 2025	
30 June 2025	CF	(Iceland) Jón Daði Böðvarsson	(Iceland) Selfoss	1 July 2025	
30 June 2025	GK	(New Zealand) Max Crocombe	(England) Millwall	1 July 2025	
30 June 2025	CF	(England) Dylan Scott	(England) Stalybridge Celtic	1 July 2025	
30 June 2025	CF	(Scotland) Jack Stretton	(England) Morecambe	1 July 2025	
30 June 2025	CB	(Republic of Ireland) Ryan Sweeney	(England) Mansfield Town	1 July 2025	
30 June 2025	CDM	(Scotland) Elliot Watt	(Scotland) Motherwell	1 July 2025	
30 June 2025	CB	(England) Cameron Gilbert	(England) Coleshill Town	30 July 2025	
30 June 2025	RM	(Republic of Ireland) Anthony Forde	(England) Altrincham	13 January 2026	
30 June 2025	CB	(England) Toby Oakes			
21 July 2025	RW	(Wales) Billy Bodin	(England) Swindon Town	21 July 2025	
22 August 2025	CM	(England) Ben Whitfield	(England) Barrow	22 August 2025	
7 November 2025	GK	(England) Harry Isted	(England) Forest Green Rovers	7 November 2025	
2 February 2026	CAM	(England) Jack Hazlehurst	(England) Marine	6 February 2026	

=== New Contract ===
Date	Pos.	Player	Contract until	Ref.
18 June 2025	CM	(South Africa) Kegs Chauke	30 June 2027	
19 June 2025	CB	(England) Finn Delap	30 June 2027	
24 June 2025	GK	(Poland) Kamil Dudek	30 June 2027	
22 October 2025	CF	(Spain) Sulyman Krubally	30 June 2027 (Note: First professional contract) (Note: Option of an additional year)	

== Pre-season and friendlies ==
On 9 June, Burton Albion announced their first pre-season fixture, against Derby County for the Bass Charity Vase. A day later, two further friendlies were confirmed against Alfreton Town and Sheffield United. A fourth fixture was shortly added after, against Birmingham City. On 17 June, a fifth friendly was confirmed, against Chesterfield.

Win Draw Loss Fixtures

8 July 2025 Friendly	Chesterfield	5–0	Burton Albion	Chesterfield
19:00 BST	Grigg 32' (pen.), 35'; Colclough 45'; Bonis 59'; Lewis 64'	Report		Stadium: SMH Group Stadium; Attendance: 2,295 (216 away)

12 July 2025 Friendly	Alfreton Town	0–1	Burton Albion	Alfreton
15:00 BST		Report	Webster 31'	Stadium: North Street; Attendance: 431; Referee: Harry Jones

19 July 2025 Friendly	Burton Albion	1–0	Birmingham City	Burton upon Trent
15:00 BST	Tavares 5'	Report		Stadium: Pirelli Stadium

22 July 2025 John Brayford testimonial	Burton Albion	1–2	Sheffield United	Burton upon Trent
19:45 BST	Beesley 19'	Report	Oné 50'; Moore 90'	Stadium: Pirelli Stadium; Attendance: 2,106; Referee: Ross Joyce

26 July 2025 Bass Charity Vase	Burton Albion	2–1	Derby County	Burton upon Trent
15:00 BST	Beesley 9', 83'	Report	Blackett-Taylor 64'	Stadium: Pirelli Stadium; Attendance: 4,013; Referee: Tom Reeves

== Competitions ==
=== League One ===
==== League table ====
Pos	Team	Pld	W	D	L	GF	GA	GD	Pts
15	Barnsley	46	15	14	17	68	73	−5	59
16	Wigan Athletic	46	14	14	18	49	58	−9	56
17	Burton Albion	46	13	15	18	50	60	−10	54
18	Peterborough United	46	15	8	23	64	68	−4	53
19	AFC Wimbledon	46	15	8	23	51	72	−21	53

Source: EFL Official Website
Rules for classification: 1) Points; 2) Goal difference; 3) Number of goals scored; 4) Head-to-head results; 5) Wins; 6) Away goals; 7) Penalty points (sec 9.5); 8) 12-point sending off offences

==== Results summary ====
Overall								Home						Away					
Pld	W	D	L	GF	GA	GD	Pts	W	D	L	GF	GA	GD	W	D	L	GF	GA	GD
46	13	15	18	50	60	−10	54	9	5	9	27	28	−1	4	10	9	23	32	−9

Last updated: complete.
Source: Soccerway

==== Results by round ====
Round	1	2	3	5	6	8	9	10	7^{2}	11	12	13	14	4^{1}	15	16	18	19	20	21	22	23	24	25	27	28	29	30	26^{4}	31	33	34	32^{5}	35	17^{3}	36	37	38	39	40	41	42	43	44	45	46
Ground	H	A	H	A	H	H	A	H	A	A	H	H	A	A	A	H	H	A	H	A	H	H	A	A	H	A	A	H	H	A	H	A	H	A	A	H	A	H	H	A	H	A	H	A	H	A
Result	W	L	D	L	L	L	D	L	W	D	W	L	W	D	W	W	L	L	D	D	W	L	L	L	W	L	L	D	L	D	W	D	W	L	D	L	W	L	W	L	D	D	W	D	D	D
Position	7	11	12	16	18	22	24	24	22	21	20	21	20	19	15	12	19	19	17	19	15	18	20	21	19	20	20	21	22	21	19	20	17	17	17	17	16	18	18	18	19	19	17	18	17	17
Points	3	3	4	4	4	4	5	5	8	9	12	12	15	16	19	22	22	22	23	24	27	27	27	27	30	30	30	31	31	32	35	36	39	39	40	40	43	43	46	46	47	48	51	52	53	54

Source: Soccerway
A = Away; H = Home; W = Win; D = Draw; L = Loss; P = Postponed
Notes:
- ^{1} Matchday 4 (vs Rotherham United) was postponed due to the EFL Cup first round tie being rescheduled.
- ^{2} Matchday 7 (vs Cardiff City) was postponed due to the international call-ups.
- ^{3} Matchday 17 (vs Exeter City) was postponed following a recent fire that damaged areas of the stadium.
- ^{4} Matchday 26 (vs Doncaster Rovers) was postponed due to FA Cup progression.
- ^{5} Matchday 32 (vs Stockport County) was postponed due to FA Cup progression.

==== Matches ====
On 26 June, the League One fixtures were announced.

Win Draw Loss Fixtures

2 August 2025 1	Burton Albion	2–1	Mansfield Town	Burton upon Trent
15:00 BST	Webster 22', 50'; Moon (yellow card) 49'; Godwin-Malife (yellow card) 76'	Report	McLaughlin (yellow card) 64'; Cargill 76'; Maris (yellow card) 90'	Stadium: Pirelli Stadium; Attendance: 5,170; Referee: Edward Duckworth

9 August 2025 2	Barnsley	3–2	Burton Albion	Barnsley
15:00 BST	Earl (yellow card) 45+3'; Vickers 55'; Keillor-Dunn 63'; Kelly (yellow card) 86'; McGoldrick 90+3'	Report	Beesley 4' (pen.); Tavares 35'; McKiernan (yellow card) 82'	Stadium: Oakwell; Attendance: 12,456 (435 away); Referee: David Rock

16 August 2025 3	Burton Albion	0–0	Port Vale	Burton upon Trent
12:30 BST	Delap (yellow card) 34'; Armer (yellow card) 43'; Beesley (yellow card) 45+1'; Lofthouse (yellow card) 50'	Report	Byers (red card) 15'; Clark (yellow card) 90+10'	Stadium: Pirelli Stadium; Attendance: 4,404; Referee: Scott Oldham
Note: Fixture was originally scheduled for a 15:00 kick-off, but was moved live Sky Sports broadcasting.

23 August 2025 5	Stockport County	2–1	Burton Albion	Edgeley
15:00 BST	Hills (red card) 31'; Fevrier (yellow card) 54'; Pye (yellow card) 58'; Diamond 69'; Norwood 77'; Moxon (yellow card) 90+1'	Report	Godwin-Malife 24'	Stadium: Edgeley Park; Attendance: 8,649; Referee: Seb Stockbridge

30 August 2025 6	Burton Albion	0–3	Luton Town	Burton upon Trent
15:00 BST		Report	Nordås 18'; Nelson (yellow card) 31', (goal) 59'; Alli 45'	Stadium: Pirelli Stadium; Attendance: 4,487; Referee: Peter Wright

13 September 2025 8	Burton Albion	0–1	Lincoln City	Burton upon Trent
15:00 BST	Lofthouse (yellow card) 90+5'; Webster (yellow card) 90+6'	Report	Bradley 22'; McGrandles (yellow card) 36'; Jackson (yellow card) 45'; House (yellow card) 77'	Stadium: Pirelli Stadium; Attendance: 3,392; Referee: Matt Corlett

20 September 2025 9	Huddersfield Town	0–0	Burton Albion	Huddersfield
15:00 BST		Report	Evans (yellow card) 26'	Stadium: Kirklees Stadium; Attendance: 15,654; Referee: Andrew Humphries

27 September 2025 10	Burton Albion	0–4	Plymouth Argyle	Burton upon Trent
15:00 BST		Report	Ibrahim (yellow card) 3'; Tolaj 31', 55'; Oseni 45'; Pepple 81'	Stadium: Pirelli Stadium; Attendance: 4,271; Referee: Tom Reeves

30 September 2025 7	Cardiff City	0–1	Burton Albion	Leckwith
19:45 BST	Kpakio (yellow card) 90+1'; Salech (yellow card) 90+5'	Report	McKiernan (yellow card) 21'; Evans (yellow card) 38'; Revan (yellow card) 69'; Webster 82'; Godwin-Malife (yellow card) 90+11'	Stadium: Cardiff City Stadium; Attendance: 15,814; Referee: Jacob Miles
Note: Fixture was originally scheduled for 6 September, but was postponed due to international call-ups.

4 October 2025 11	Doncaster Rovers	1–1	Burton Albion	Doncaster
12:30 BST	Pearson 31'; Sbarra (yellow card) 72'		Hartridge (yellow card) 33'; Shade 69'	Stadium: Eco-Power Stadium; Attendance: 7,435; Referee: Thomas Parsons
Note: Fixture was originally scheduled for a 15:00 kick-off, but was rescheduled for live Sky Sports broadcasting.

11 October 2025 12	Burton Albion	3–0	Bolton Wanderers	Burton upon Trent
15:00 BST	Beesley 27' (pen.), 90+4'; Godwin-Malife (yellow card) 45+2'; Tavares 48'	Report	Cissoko (yellow card) 42'; Forss (yellow card) 90+9'	Stadium: Pirelli Stadium; Attendance: 4,725; Referee: Neil Hair

18 October 2025 13	Burton Albion	0–1	Peterborough United	Burton upon Trent
12:30 BST	Delap (yellow card) 55'; Armer (yellow card) 59'	Report	Morgan (yellow card) 25'; Lees (yellow card) 35' (yellow-red card) 81'; O'Connor (yellow card) 42'; Collins 65'	Stadium: Pirelli Stadium; Attendance: 3,786; Referee: Elliot Bell
Note: Fixture was originally scheduled for a 15:00 kick-off, but was rescheduled for live Sky Sports broadcasting.

25 October 2025 14	AFC Wimbledon	0–1	Burton Albion	Wimbledon
15:00 BST	Bugiel (penalty missed) 34', (yellow card) 48'; Johnson (yellow card) 72'	Report	Hartridge 51', (yellow card) 72'; Collins (yellow card) 79'; Godwin-Malife (yellow card) 90+3'	Stadium: Plough Lane; Attendance: 8,361; Referee: Ben Atkinson

4 November 2025 4	Rotherham United	2–2	Burton Albion	Rotherham
19:45 GMT	Sibbick 69' (o.g.); Douglas 90+4'	Report	Lofthouse 51', (yellow card) 69'; Shade 63', (yellow card) 76'; Collins (yellow card) 84'	Stadium: New York Stadium; Attendance: 7,228; Referee: Ross Joyce
Note: Fixture was originally scheduled for 19 August, but was postponed due the EFL Cup first round tie being rescheduled.

8 November 2025 15	Bradford City	1–2	Burton Albion	Bradford
15:00 GMT	Pennington (yellow card) 32'; Pointon (yellow card) 45+3', (goal) 76' (pen.)	Report	Beesley 4', (yellow card) 84'; Armer (yellow card) 35'; Webster 45+1'; Hartridge (yellow card) 75'; Chauke (yellow card) 90+1'	Stadium: Valley Parade; Attendance: 20,408; Referee: Craig Hicks

15 November 2025 16	Burton Albion	1–0	Blackpool	Burton upon Trent
15:00 GMT	Beesley 65'; Godwin-Malife (yellow card) 67'; McKiernan (yellow card) 80'; Collins (yellow card) 81'	Report	Evans (yellow card) 58'; Fletcher (yellow card) 60'; Bloxham (yellow card) 67'; Casey (yellow card) 74'	Stadium: Pirelli Stadium; Attendance: 4,054; Referee: Lee Swabey

29 November 2025 18	Burton Albion	0–4	Leyton Orient	Burton upon Trent
15:00 GMT	Evans (yellow card) 29'; Chauke (yellow card) 61'; Lofthouse (yellow card) 90+6'	Report	Connolly 12'; Ballard 26'; Abdulai 65'; Wellens 75'	Stadium: Pirelli Stadium; Attendance: 3,264; Referee: Paul Howard

2 December 2025 19	Wigan Athletic	1–0	Burton Albion	Wigan
19:45 GMT	Mullin 41'; Weir (yellow card) 70'	Report	Moon (yellow card) 36'	Stadium: Brick Community Stadium; Attendance: 7,343; Referee: Martin Woods
Note: Fixture was initially scheduled for 9 December, but was rescheduled due to Burton's FA Cup fixture being moved to 8 December for TV Coverage.

13 December 2025 20	Burton Albion	0–0	Wycombe Wanderers	Burton upon Trent
15:00 GMT		Report	Casey (yellow card) 49'	Stadium: Pirelli Stadium; Attendance: 2,844; Referee: Neil Hair and Richie Watkins

20 December 2025 21	Stevenage	2–2	Burton Albion	Stevenage
12:30 GMT	Reid 46'; Armer 60' (o.g.); Earley (yellow card) 76'	Report	Shade 22'; Beesley 67'; Williams (yellow card) 68'	Stadium: Broadhall Way; Attendance: 3,282; Referee: Scott Oldham
Note: Fixture was originally scheduled for a 15:00 kick-off, but was rescheduled for live Sky Sports broadcasting.

26 December 2025 22	Burton Albion	5–1	Northampton Town	Burton upon Trent
15:00 GMT	Beesley 3' (pen.); Armer 23'; Dyche 28' (o.g.); Shade 44', 84'; Williams (yellow card) 56'; Vancooten (yellow card) 59'; Evans (yellow card) 77'	Report	Eaves 39'; Wheatley (yellow card) 51'; Burroughs (yellow card) 75'	Stadium: Pirelli Stadium; Attendance: 4,704; Referee: Sam Mulhall

29 December 2025 23	Burton Albion	0–2	Wigan Athletic	Burton upon Trent
19:45 GMT		Report	Wright (yellow card) 41'; Bettoni 64'; Costelloe 87'	Stadium: Pirelli Stadium; Attendance: 3,696; Referee: Richie Watkins

1 January 2026 24	Reading	2–0	Burton Albion	Reading
15:00 GMT	Marriott 18'; Kyerewaa 37'	Report		Stadium: Madejski Stadium; Attendance: 12,104; Referee: Tom Reeves

4 January 2026 25	Plymouth Argyle	3–0	Burton Albion	Plymouth
15:00 GMT	Galloway 21'; Ross 63'; Tolaj (yellow card) 66', (goal) 77' (pen.); Mumba (yellow card) 67'	Report	Lofthouse (yellow card) 79'; Tavares (yellow card) 79'	Stadium: Home Park; Attendance: 14,662 (257 away); Referee: Ollie Yates

17 January 2026 27	Burton Albion	3–1	Huddersfield Town	Burton upon Trent
15:00 GMT	Vancooten 4'; Beesley 57'; McKiernan 78'	Report	May 28'	Stadium: Pirelli Stadium; Attendance: 4,318; Referee: Simon Mather

22 January 2026 28	Lincoln City	2–1	Burton Albion	Lincoln
20:00 GMT	Moylan 35', 55'; Hamer (yellow card) 85'; Lloyd (yellow card) 89'; Darikwa (yellow card) 90'	Report	Beesley 37'	Stadium: Sincil Bank; Attendance: 9,514 (302 away); Referee: Matt Corlett
Note: Fixture was originally scheduled for 24 January, but was rescheduled for live Sky Sports broadcasting.

27 January 2026 29	Bolton Wanderers	2–1	Burton Albion	Bolton
19:45 GMT	Dalby 50', 90+3', (yellow card) 66'; Christie (yellow card) 54'; Osei-Tutu (yellow card) 86'	Report	Armer 69'; Godwin-Malife (yellow card) 81'	Stadium: Toughsheet Community Stadium; Attendance: 18,820 (158 away); Referee: Thomas Parsons

31 January 2026 30	Burton Albion	2–2	Cardiff City	Burton upon Trent
15:00 GMT	Beesley 11'; McKiernan (yellow card) 30'; Williams (yellow card) 32'; Lofthouse 78'	Report	Kpakio (yellow card) 17'; Robertson 46', 63'	Stadium: Pirelli Stadium; Attendance: 4,864; Referee: Martin Coy

3 February 2026 26	Burton Albion	1–2	Doncaster Rovers	Burton upon Trent
19:45 GMT	Lofthouse 74'; Beesley (yellow card) 78'	Report	Molyneux 2' (pen.); Bailey 12'; Gotts (yellow card) 29'; Senior (yellow card) 45+1'	Stadium: Pirelli Stadium; Attendance: 3,069; Referee: Charles Breakspear
Note: Fixture was originally scheduled for 10 January, but it was postponed due to FA Cup progression.

7 February 2026 31	Port Vale	2–2	Burton Albion	Burslem
12:30 GMT	Archer 6'; Waine 29'; G. Hall (yellow card) 40'; C. Hall (yellow card) 61'	Report	Godwin-Malife (yellow card) 5'; Beesley 26', 52'; Vancooten (yellow card) 36'; Krubally (yellow card) 55'	Stadium: Vale Park; Attendance: 6,232 (602 away); Referee: Will Finnie
Note: Fixture was originally scheduled for 24 January, but was rescheduled for live Sky Sports broadcasting.

17 February 2026 33	Burton Albion	1–0	Rotherham United	Burton upon Trent
19:45 GMT	Shade 23'; Vancooten (yellow card) 54'	Report	Yearwood (yellow card) 36'; Jules (yellow card) 45+1'	Stadium: Pirelli Stadium; Attendance: 3,405 (796 away); Referee: Abigail Byrne

21 February 2026 34	Luton Town	1–1	Burton Albion	Luton
15:00 GMT	Wells 13'; Palmer (yellow card) 36'; Keeley (yellow card) 82'; van den Berg (yellow card) 89'	Report	Evans (yellow card) 29'; Lofthouse (yellow card) 74'; Cannon (yellow card) 89'; Tavares 90+2'	Stadium: Kenilworth Road; Attendance: 10,364; Referee: Seb Stockbridge

24 February 2026 32	Burton Albion	3–0	Stockport County	Burton upon Trent
19:45 GMT	Shade 47', 64'; Evans 55'; Lofthouse (yellow card) 83'	Report	Hills (yellow card) 23'; Pye (yellow card) 61'; Sidibeh (yellow card) 70'; Bate (yellow card) 81'	Stadium: Pirelli Stadium; Attendance: 3,224; Referee: Stephen Parkinson
Note: Fixture was initially scheduled for 14 February, but was rearranged due to FA Cup fourth round involvements.

28 February 2026 35	Wycombe Wanderers	3–0	Burton Albion	High Wycombe
15:00 GMT	Boyd-Munce 15'; Henderson (yellow card) 20'; Harris (yellow card) 45+2', (goal) 81'; Norris (yellow card) 55'; Lowe 82'	Report	Cannon (yellow card) 45+2'; Sibbick (yellow card) 85'	Stadium: Adams Park; Attendance: 4,797; Referee: Alex Chilowicz

3 March 2026 17	Exeter City	1–1	Burton Albion	Exeter
19:45 GMT	Wareham (yellow card) 43'; Magennis 73'	Report	Godwin-Malife 64'; McKiernan (yellow card) 74'; Evans (yellow card) 87'	Stadium: St James Park; Attendance: 5,221 (79 away); Referee: Paul Howard
Note: Fixture was originally scheduled for 22 November, but was postponed due to a recent fire causing damage to the stadium.

7 March 2026 36	Burton Albion	0–1	Stevenage	Burton upon Trent
15:00 GMT	Beesley (yellow card) 72'	Report	Reid 44'; White (yellow card) 49'; Piergianni (yellow card) 69'; Houghton (yellow card) 90+4'	Stadium: Pirelli Stadium; Attendance: 3,198; Referee: Craig Hicks

14 March 2026 37	Northampton Town	0–2	Burton Albion	Northampton
15:00 GMT	Taylor (yellow card) 13'; McGeehan (yellow card) 20'	Report	Beesley 32'; Collins (yellow card) 70'; Chauke (yellow card) 86'; Lofthouse 89'	Stadium: Sixfields Stadium; Attendance: 6,450 (433 away); Referee: Lee Swabey

17 March 2026 38	Burton Albion	1–2	Reading	Burton upon Trent
19:45 GMT	Evans 25'; Beesley (yellow card) 90+6'	Report	Doyle 33'; Wing (yellow card) 77'; Ehibhatiomhan 88'	Stadium: Pirelli Stadium; Attendance: 2,902; Referee: Edward Duckworth

21 March 2026 39	Burton Albion	2–1	Bradford City	Burton upon Trent
15:00 GMT	Hartridge 41'; Shade 58'; Collins (yellow card) 90+9'	Report	Pointin (yellow card) 18'; Baldwin (yellow card) 41'; Wheatley (yellow card) 76'; Metcalfe (yellow card) 77'; Wright 90+2'; Pennington (yellow card) 90+7'	Stadium: Pirelli Stadium; Attendance: 4,522 (1,594 away); Referee: Carl Brook

28 March 2026 40	Blackpool	1–0	Burton Albion	Blackpool
15:00 GMT	Brown (yellow card) 15'; Fletcher (yellow card) 56'; Horsfall (yellow card) 64'; Hamilton 90+1'; Clarkson (yellow card) 90+6'; Honeyman (yellow card) 90+7'	Report	Hartridge (yellow card) 22'; Chauke (yellow card) 68'; Lofthouse (yellow card) 90+8'	Stadium: Bloomfield Road; Attendance: 11,060; Referee: Martin Coy

3 April 2026 41	Burton Albion	1–1	Barnsley	Burton upon Trent
15:00 BST	Webster 60'; Hartridge (yellow card) 76'	Report	Connell (yellow card) 11'; Farrell (yellow card) 86'; McGoldrick 90'; Roberts (yellow card) 90+5'	Stadium: Pirelli Stadium; Attendance: 4,203; Referee: Kirsty Dowle

6 April 2026 42	Mansfield Town	0–0	Burton Albion	Mansfield
15:00 BST	Hendry (yellow card) 28'; Reed (yellow card) 38'; McLaughlin (yellow card) 52'	Report	Shade (yellow card) 61'	Stadium: Field Mill; Attendance: 8,049 (747 away); Referee: Matthew Russell

11 April 2026 43	Burton Albion	1–0	AFC Wimbledon	Burton upon Trent
15:00 BST	Lofthouse 55'; Webster (yellow card) 76'	Report		Stadium: Pirelli Stadium; Attendance: 3,654 (582 away); Referee: Martin Woods

19 April 2026 44	Peterborough United	1–1	Burton Albion	Peterborough
13:00 BST	Garbett (yellow card) 51'; Leonard 60'	Report	Chauke (yellow card) 14'; Webster 44'; Collins (yellow card) 90+8'	Stadium: Weston Homes Stadium; Attendance: 7,731 (343 away); Referee: Steven Copeland
Note: Fixture was initially scheduled for 18 April, but was pushed back a day due to Peterborough also playing on the preceding Thursday.

25 April 2026 45	Burton Albion	1–1	Exeter City	Burton upon Trent
15:00 BST	Moon 61'	Report	Niskanen 14'; Woodhouse (yellow card) 88'	Stadium: Pirelli Stadium; Attendance: 5,719; Referee: Elliot Bell

2 May 2026 46	Leyton Orient	2–2	Burton Albion	Leyton
15:00 BST	Forrester 2'; Ballard 51'; Morris (yellow card) 54'	Report	Tavares 34'; Evans (yellow card) 55'; Hartridge 58'	Stadium: Brisbane Road; Referee: Paul Howard

=== FA Cup ===
Burton were drawn at home to St Albans City in the first round, away to Brackley Town in the second round, away to Boreham Wood in the third round and at home to West Ham United in the fourth round.

Win Draw Loss Fixtures

1 November 2025 First round	Burton Albion	6–0	St Albans City	Burton upon Trent
15:00 GMT	Shade 1', 80'; Webster 47', 56'; Tavares 83', 90+6'	Report	James (yellow card) 34'; Page (yellow card) 41'; Dyer (yellow card) 76'; Perez-Duah (yellow card) 87'	Stadium: Pirelli Stadium; Attendance: 2,523; Referee: Declan Brown

8 December 2025 Second round	Brackley Town	1–3	Burton Albion	Brackley
19:30 GMT	Nottingham 25'	Report	Shade 13', 73', 88'; Sibbick (yellow card) 45+1'; Vancooten (yellow card) 49'	Stadium: St James Park; Attendance: 2,978; Referee: Alex Chilowicz

10 January 2026 Third round	Boreham Wood	0–5	Burton Albion	Borehamwood
15:00 GMT	Robinson (yellow card) 75'; Rush (yellow card) 77'	Report	Chauke (yellow card) 28'; Krubally (yellow card) 32'; Lofthouse 35'; O'Connell 41' (o.g.); Williams (yellow card) 57', (goal) 83'; Tavares 67'; Armer (yellow card) 87'; McKiernan 90+2'	Stadium: Meadow Park; Attendance: 2,201 (447 away); Referee: Andrew Humphries

14 February 2026 Fourth round	Burton Albion	0–1 (a.e.t.)	West Ham United	Burton upon Trent
12:15 GMT	Godwin-Malife (yellow card) 120+3'; Adom (yellow card) 120+3'	Report	Summerville 95'; Potts (red card) 101'; Walker-Peters (yellow card) 120+2'	Stadium: Pirelli Stadium; Attendance: 6,514; Referee: Lewis Smith

=== EFL Cup ===
Burton were drawn away to Tranmere Rovers in the first round and at home to Lincoln City in the second round.

Win Draw Loss Fixtures

19 August 2025 First round	Tranmere Rovers	1–1 (4–5 p)	Burton Albion	Birkenhead
19:45 BST	Whitaker 37'; Jennings (yellow card) 41'	Report	Whitfield 10'; Newall (yellow card) 72'; Sibbick (yellow card) 90+7'	Stadium: Prenton Park; Attendance: 3,524; Referee: Simon Mather
	Penalties
	Patrick (penalty scored); Lowe (penalty scored); Harris (penalty scored); Blacker (penalty missed); O'Connor (penalty missed); Norman (penalty scored); Davison (penalty missed)		(penalty missed) Whitfield; (penalty scored) Revan; (penalty scored) Larsson; (penalty missed) Tavares; (penalty scored) Williams; (penalty scored) Akoto; (penalty scored) Delap
Note: Fixture was originally scheduled for 12 August, but was postponed due to a major power outage.

26 August 2025 Second round	Burton Albion	0–1	Lincoln City	Burton upon Trent
19:45 BST	Larsson (yellow card) 11'; Newall (yellow card) 57'; Tavares (yellow card) 88'	Report	Varfolomeyev (yellow card) 72'; Jackson (yellow card) 73'; House 89'	Stadium: Pirelli Stadium; Attendance: 1,837; Referee: Oliver Mackey

=== EFL Trophy ===
Burton were drawn against Chesterfield, Crewe Alexandra and Liverpool U21 in the group stage.

Pos	Div	Team	Pld	W	PW	PL	L	GF	GA	GD	Pts	Qualification
1	L2	Crewe Alexandra	3	3	0	0	0	12	2	+10	9	Advance to Round 2
2	L2	Chesterfield	3	1	0	1	1	4	9	−5	4	Advance to Round 2
3	L1	Burton Albion	3	1	0	0	2	3	4	−1	3	
4	ACA	Liverpool U21	3	0	1	0	2	2	6	−4	2	

Source: EFL

2 September 2025 North Group H	Burton Albion	2–0	Liverpool U21	Burton upon Trent
19:00 BST	Tavares 37'; Hartridge (yellow card) 53'; Delap (yellow card) 64'; Larsson 67'	Report	Morrison (yellow card) 83'; Figueroa (yellow card) 87'; Onanuga (yellow card) 89'	Stadium: Pirelli Stadium; Attendance: 973; Referee: Richard Aspinall

7 October 2025 North Group H	Chesterfield	1–0	Burton Albion	Chesterfield
19:00 BST	Naylor (yellow card) 33'; Bonis 79'	Report		Stadium: SMH Group Stadium; Attendance: 1,229; Referee: Alex Chilowicz

11 November 2025 North Group H	Burton Albion	1–3	Crewe Alexandra	Burton upon Trent
19:00 GMT	Scutt 50'; Tavares (penalty missed) 58'	Report	Bogle 10', 19'; Holíček (yellow card) 25'; Hodkin 48'; Mingi (yellow card) 88'	Stadium: Pirelli Stadium; Attendance: 791; Referee: Peter Wright

== Statistics ==
=== Appearances and goals ===
Players with no appearances are not included on the list; italics indicate loaned in player

No.	Pos	Nat	Player	Total		League One		FA Cup		EFL Cup		EFL Trophy	
No.	Pos	Nat	Player	Apps	Goals	Apps	Goals	Apps	Goals	Apps	Goals	Apps	Goals
2	DF	(England) ENG	Udoka Godwin-Malife	42	2	37+1	2	2+0	0	0+0	0	1+1	0
3	DF	(Scotland) SCO	Jack Armer	42	2	31+4	2	3+1	0	1+0	0	1+1	0
4	MF	(South Africa) RSA	Kegs Chauke	44	0	35+3	0	2+2	0	0+0	0	2+0	0
5	DF	(Guyana) GUY	Terence Vancooten	23	1	15+5	1	3+0	0	0+0	0	0+0	0
6	DF	(Uganda) UGA	Toby Sibbick	42	0	28+8	0	3+1	0	0+2	0	0+0	0
7	MF	(Northern Ireland) NIR	JJ McKiernan	35	2	17+14	1	1+1	1	0+0	0	2+0	0
8	MF	(England) ENG	Charlie Webster	25	8	21+2	6	1+0	2	1+0	0	0+0	0
9	FW	(England) ENG	Jake Beesley	47	13	45+0	13	2+0	0	0+0	0	0+0	0
10	FW	(Saint Kitts and Nevis) SKN	Tyrese Shade	44	14	30+8	9	3+0	5	1+1	0	0+1	0
11	FW	(Portugal) POR	Fábio Tavares	35	8	10+17	4	1+2	3	1+1	0	3+0	1
12	MF	(England) ENG	George Evans	37	2	31+2	2	4+0	0	0+0	0	0+0	0
14	DF	(United States) USA	Nick Akoto	13	0	0+7	0	1+1	0	2+0	0	2+0	0
15	DF	(England) ENG	Kyran Lofthouse	51	6	45+0	5	4+0	1	0+1	0	1+0	0
16	DF	(England) ENG	Alex Hartridge	43	3	38+1	3	2+0	0	0+0	0	1+1	0
18	DF	(England) ENG	Jasper Moon	24	1	16+5	1	0+2	0	1+0	0	0+0	0
19	DF	(England) ENG	Dylan Williams	31	1	15+11	0	1+1	1	2+0	0	1+0	0
20	DF	(England) ENG	Jason Sraha	4	0	0+3	0	0+0	0	0+0	0	1+0	0
21	GK	(Ghana) GHA	Jordan Amissah	6	0	5+0	0	0+0	0	0+0	0	1+0	0
22	FW	(Sweden) SWE	Julian Larsson	28	1	8+13	0	2+1	0	2+0	0	2+0	1
23	DF	(England) ENG	Sebastian Revan	18	0	9+6	0	1+0	0	0+1	0	0+1	0
24	GK	(England) ENG	Bradley Collins	42	0	40+0	0	2+0	0	0+0	0	0+0	0
25	MF	(Republic of Ireland) IRL	Ciaran Gilligan	3	0	0+1	0	0+0	0	1+0	0	1+0	0
26	DF	(England) ENG	Finn Delap	12	0	6+2	0	0+0	0	2+0	0	2+0	0
27	GK	(Poland) POL	Kamil Dudek	7	0	1+0	0	2+0	0	2+0	0	2+0	0
29	FW	(England) ENG	Kain Adom	15	0	6+7	0	1+1	0	0+0	0	0+0	0
33	DF	(Albania) ALB	Geraldo Bajrami	1	0	0+0	0	0+0	0	1+0	0	0+0	0
34	MF	(England) ENG	Ben Whitfield	1	1	0+0	0	0+0	0	1+0	1	0+0	0
37	FW	(Lithuania) LTU	Tomas Kalinauskas	1	0	0+1	0	0+0	0	0+0	0	0+0	0
38	FW	(England) ENG	Jack Newall	14	0	0+7	0	0+3	0	2+0	0	1+1	0
39	DF	(England) ENG	Josh Taroni	13	0	0+6	0	1+1	0	2+0	0	3+0	0
40	DF	(England) ENG	Bodi Thistleton	1	0	0+0	0	0+0	0	0+0	0	1+0	0
41	MF	(Spain) ESP	Sulyman Krubally	28	0	8+12	0	2+2	0	0+1	0	1+2	0
42	MF	(England) ENG	Andy Cannon	17	0	9+7	0	0+1	0	0+0	0	0+0	0
48	MF	(England) ENG	Daniel Matthews	2	0	0+0	0	0+0	0	0+0	0	1+1	0
49	MF	(England) ENG	Matty Lay	2	0	0+0	0	0+0	0	0+0	0	0+2	0
50	FW	(England) ENG	Jamal Williamson	4	0	0+3	0	0+0	0	0+0	0	0+1	0
52	DF	(England) ENG	William Earley	1	0	0+0	0	0+0	0	0+0	0	1+0	0
53	FW	(England) ENG	Robbie Meakin	1	0	0+0	0	0+0	0	0+0	0	0+1	0
54	MF	(England) ENG	Samuel Oyemade	1	0	0+0	0	0+0	0	0+0	0	0+1	0
55	MF	(England) ENG	Kairo Piper	1	0	0+0	0	0+0	0	0+0	0	0+1	0
56	FW	(England) ENG	Zac Scutt	5	1	0+3	0	0+1	0	0+0	0	1+0	1
Players who featured but departed the club during the season:
17	MF	(England) ENG	Jack Hazlehurst	2	0	0+1	0	0+0	0	0+0	0	1+0	0
