= Jack Newall =

English footballer (born 2007)

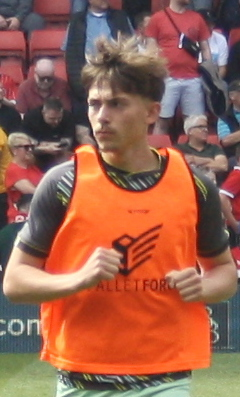
- Newall with Burton Albion in 2025

Personal information
- Full name: Jack John Newall
- Date of birth: 15 March 2007 (age 19)
- Place of birth: Stafford, England
- Position: Striker

Team information
- Current team: Stoke City

Youth career
- –2022: Derby County
- 2022–2023: West Bromwich Albion
- 2023–2024: Burton Albion

Senior career*
Years	Team	Apps	(Gls)
2024–2026	Burton Albion	8	(0)
2024	→ Carlton Town (loan)	6	(4)
2024–2025	→ Bromsgrove Sporting (loan)	17	(2)
2026	→ Stourbridge (loan)	1	(0)
2026	→ Alfreton Town (loan)	7	(0)
2026–	Stoke City	0	(0)
- * Club domestic league appearances and goals as of 22:39, 31 July 2026 (UTC)

Jack John Newall (born 15 March 2007) is an English professional footballer who plays as a striker for Stoke City.

== Club career ==
=== Burton Albion ===
A youth product of Derby County, West Bromwich Albion and Burton Albion, Newall signed as a first year scholar with Burton Albion on 25 July 2023. On 9 August 2024, Newall joined Carlton Town on loan in the Northern Premier League. On 29 October 2024, Bromsgrove Sporting announced he joined the club on a work experience loan in the Southern Football League. He made his senior and professional debut with Burton Albion in a 5–2 EFL Cup win over Northampton Town on 12 November 2024. On 13 May 2025, Newall was promoted to Burton Albion's senior team. In January 2026, he joined Stourbridge on an initial one-month loan. On 12 May 2026, Burton said the player would leave in the summer once his contract expired.

=== Stoke City ===
Newall joined EFL Championship side Stoke City in July 2026, linking up with their U21 squad.

== Career statistics ==
As of end of 2025–26 season

Appearances and goals by club, season and competition
Club	Season	League			FA Cup		League Cup		Other		Total	
Club	Season	Division	Apps	Goals	Apps	Goals	Apps	Goals	Apps	Goals	Apps	Goals
Burton Albion	2024–25	League One	1	0	0	0	0	0	1 (Note: Appearance(s) in EFL Trophy)	0	2	0
Burton Albion	2025–26	League One	7	0	3	0	2	0	2	0	14	0
Burton Albion	Total		8	0	3	0	2	0	3	0	16	0
Carlton Town (loan)	2024–25	Northern Premier League Division One East	6	4	0	0	—		1 (Note: Appearance(s) in FA Trophy)	0	7	4
Bromsgrove Sporting (loan)	2024–25	Southern League Premier Division Central	17	2	0	0	—		0	0	17	2
Stourbridge (loan)	2025–26	Southern League Premier Division Central	1	0	0	0	—		0	0	1	0
Alfreton Town (loan)	2025–26	National League North	7	0	0	0	—		—		7	0
Stoke City	2026–27	Championship	0	0	0	0	0	0	—		0	0
Career total			39	6	3	0	2	0	4	0	48	6
