= Udoka Godwin-Malife =

English footballer (born 2000)

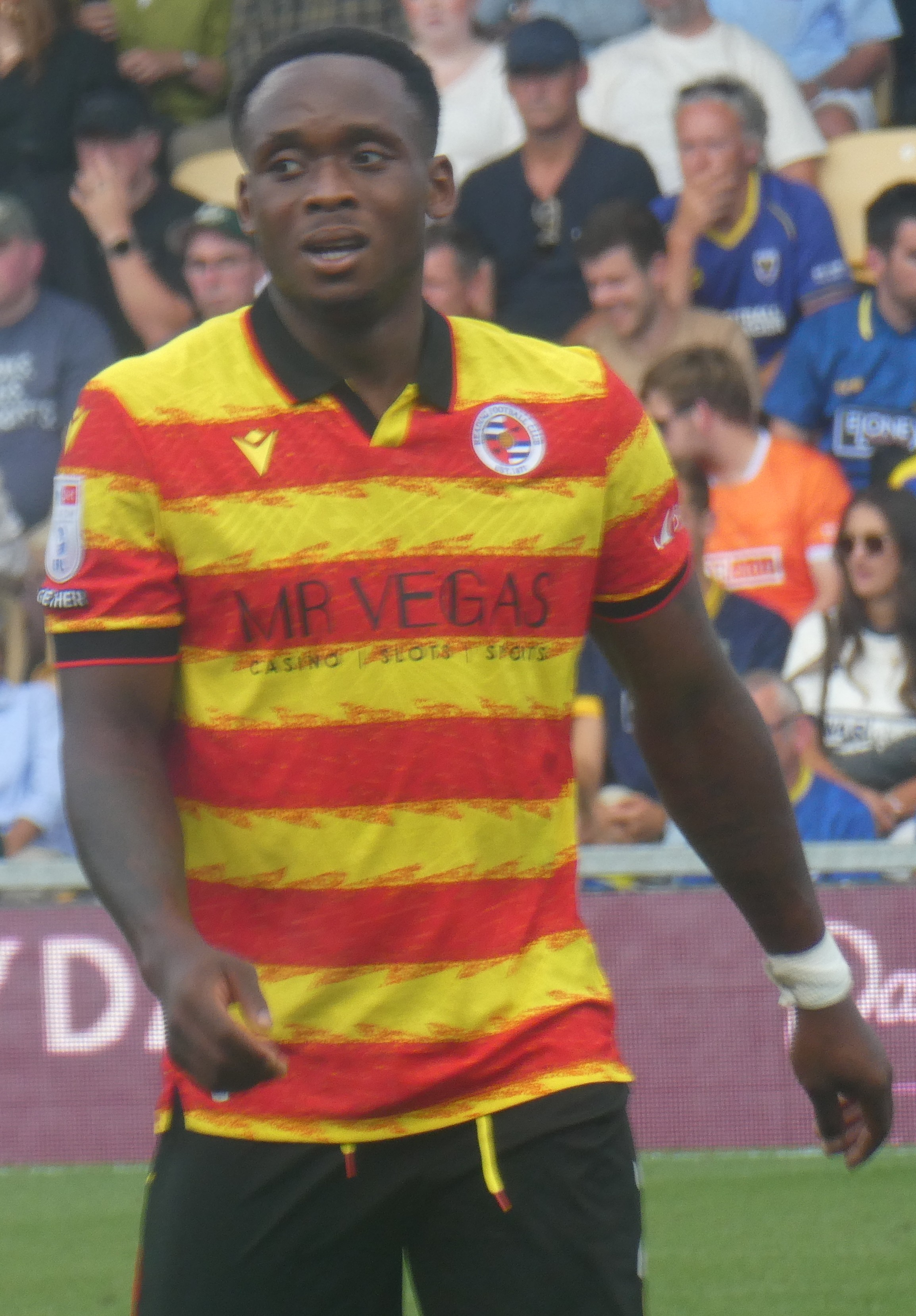
- Godwin-Malife with Reading in 2026

Personal information
- Full name: Udoka Favour Godwin-Malife
- Date of birth: 9 May 2000 (age 26)
- Place of birth: Oxford, England
- Height: 5 ft 11 in (1.80 m)
- Position: Defender

Team information
- Current team: Reading
- Number: 2

Youth career
- Littlemore
- Oxford City

Senior career*
Years	Team	Apps	(Gls)
2017–2018	Oxford City Nomads	18	(3)
2017–2019	Oxford City	32	(0)
2019–2023	Forest Green Rovers	112	(0)
2020	→ Eastleigh (loan)	4	(0)
2023–2024	Swindon Town	42	(1)
2024–2026	Burton Albion	80	(3)
2026–	Reading	16	(1)
- * Club domestic league appearances and goals as of 11:19, 22 November 2026 (UTC)

Udoka Favour Godwin-Malife (born 9 May 2000) is an English professional footballer who plays as a defender for EFL League One club Reading.

== Career ==
Godwin-Malife initially began his career playing for local side Littlemore, before signing for hometown club Oxford City at the age of 16 after previously playing for the club during his schoolyears. Godwin-Malife initially played for the club's reserve side, Oxford City Nomads, in the Hellenic League, before making his first team debut for Oxford City in a 1–1 draw against St Albans City on 9 December 2017.

In January 2019, Godwin-Malife signed for Forest Green Rovers. He moved on loan to Eastleigh in January 2020.

In June 2021 he signed a new two-year contract with Forest Green.

In August 2023 he signed for Swindon Town for an undisclosed fee.

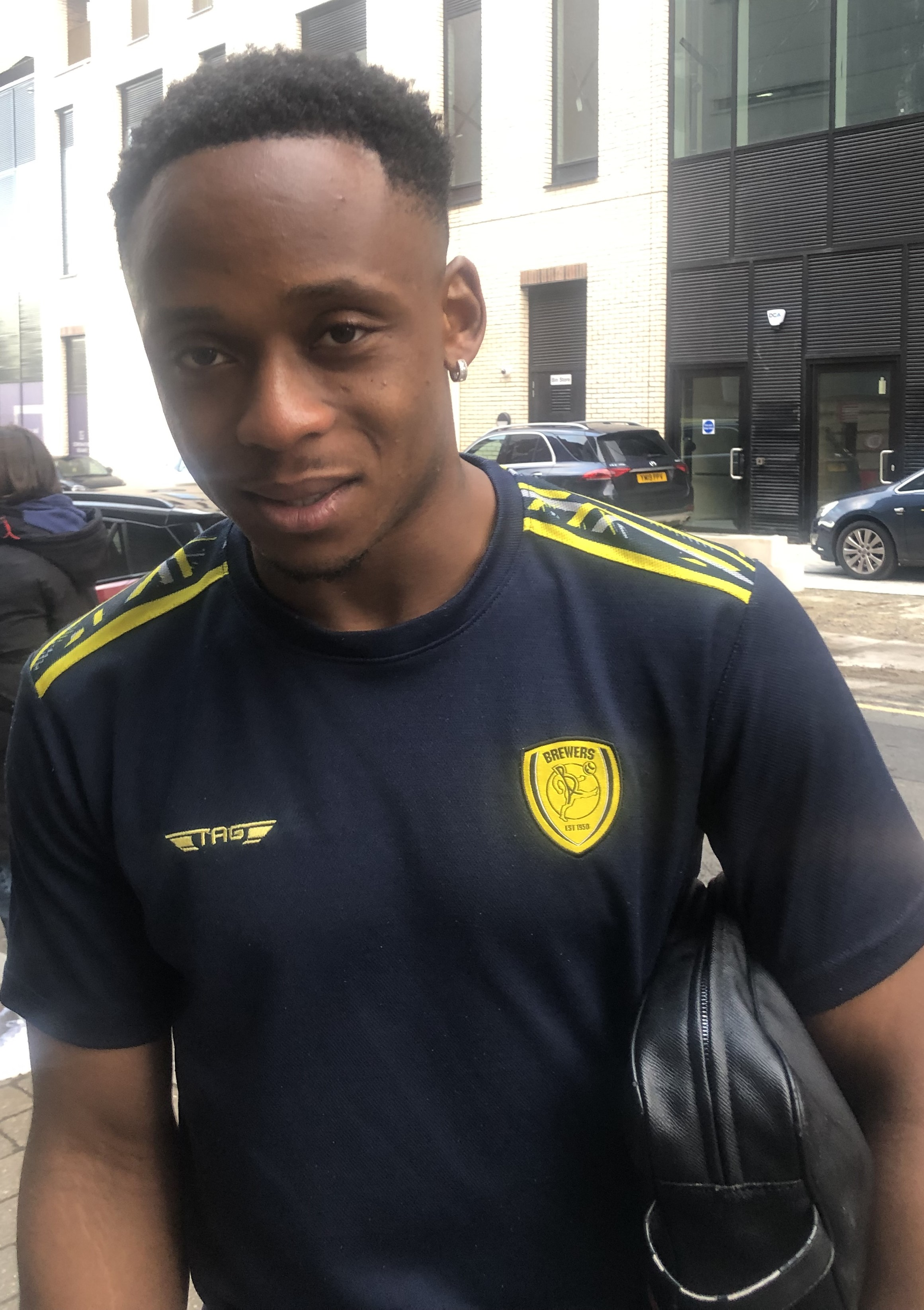
Godwin-Malife with Burton Albion in 2024

He moved to Burton Albion in June 2024 for an undisclosed fee, signing a three-year contract.

=== Reading ===
On 30 June 2026, Reading announced the signing of Godwin-Malife from Burton Albion for an undisclosed fee, on a contract until the summer of 2029.

== Personal life ==
Godwin-Malife is of Nigerian descent.

== Career statistics ==
As of match played 21 November 2026

Appearances and goals by club, season and competition
Club	Season	League			FA Cup		League Cup		Other		Total	
Club	Season	Division	Apps	Goals	Apps	Goals	Apps	Goals	Apps	Goals	Apps	Goals
Oxford City Nomads	2017–18	Hellenic League Premier Division	18	3	—		—		5 (Note: One appearance in FA Vase, two appearances one goal in Hellenic League Floodlit Cup, two appearances in Oxfordshire Senior Cup)	1	23	4
Oxford City	2017–18	National League South	8	0	0	0	—		0	0	8	0
Oxford City	2018–19	National League South	24	0	6	0	—		3 (Note: Appearance(s) in the FA Trophy)	0	33	0
Oxford City	Total		32	0	6	0	0	0	3	0	41	0
Forest Green Rovers	2018–19	League Two	5	0	0	0	0	0	0	0	5	0
Forest Green Rovers	2019–20	League Two	12	0	1	0	2	0	3 (Note: Appearance(s) in the Football League Trophy)	0	18	0
Forest Green Rovers	2020–21	League Two	44	0	1	0	1	0	4 (Note: Two appearances in the EFL Trophy; two appearances in League Two play-offs)	0	50	0
Forest Green Rovers	2021–22	League Two	26	0	1	0	1	0	2	0	30	0
Forest Green Rovers	2022–23	League One	25	0	0	0	0	0	0	0	25	0
Forest Green Rovers	Total		112	0	3	0	4	0	9	0	128	0
Eastleigh (loan)	2019–20	National League	4	0	0	0	—		1	0	5	0
Swindon Town	2023–24	League Two	42	1	1	0	1	0	0	0	44	1
Burton Albion	2024–25	League One	42	1	2	0	0	0	2	0	46	1
Burton Albion	2025–26	League One	38	2	2	0	0	0	2	0	42	2
Burton Albion	Total		80	3	4	0	0	0	4	0	88	3
Reading	2026–27	League One	16	1	1	0	1	0	0	0	18	1
Career total			304	8	15	0	6	0	22	1	347	9

== Honours ==
Forest Green Rovers

- EFL League Two: 2021–22
