= JJ McKiernan =

Footballer (born 2002)

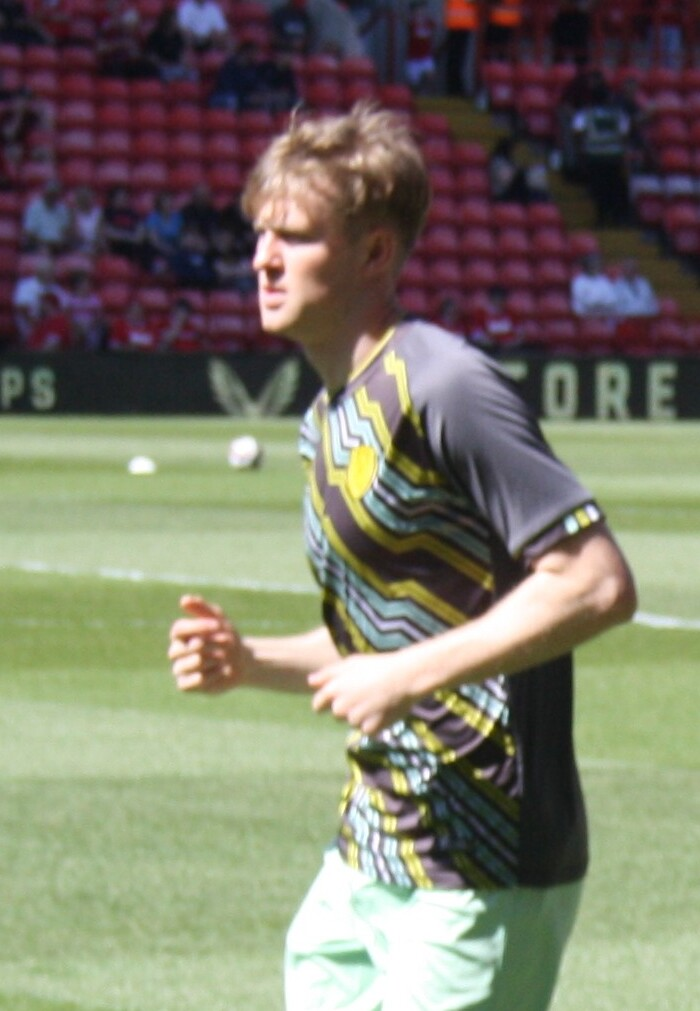
- McKiernan in 2025

Personal information
- Full name: John Joshua McKiernan
- Date of birth: 18 January 2002 (age 24)
- Place of birth: Southampton, England
- Height: 1.84 m (6 ft 0 in)
- Position: Attacking midfielder

Team information
- Current team: Bromley
- Number: 28

Youth career
- –2018: Andover Town
- 2018–2022: Watford

Senior career*
Years	Team	Apps	(Gls)
2022–2023	Watford	0	(0)
2022	→ Bohemians (loan)	1	(0)
2022–2023	→ Eastleigh (loan)	41	(4)
2023–2024	Morecambe	28	(7)
2024–2026	Lincoln City	12	(0)
2025–2026	→ Burton Albion (loan)	50	(2)
2026–	Bromley	13	(3)

International career
2020–2024	Northern Ireland U21	11	(1)
- * Club domestic league appearances and goals as of 14:31, 21 November 2026 (UTC)

John Joshua "JJ" McKiernan (born 18 January 2002) is a professional footballer who plays as an attacking midfielder for EFL League One club Bromley. Born in England, he has represented Northern Ireland at youth international level.

== Club career ==
Born in Southampton, McKiernan was part of the Hampshire side which won the English Schools' Football Association under-16 Inter County Trophy in July 2018, scoring the winner in the final at the Bet365 Stadium. He joined Watford at U18 level in December 2018 having previously played for non-league Andover Town in the FA Youth Cup. He signed his professional contract in July 2021 and has been given squad number 43.

McKiernan moved to Bohemians on loan in January 2022 and made one appearance before returning to Watford to attend pre-season training camp in Austria, including an appearance against Panathinaikos. McKiernan joined National League team Eastleigh in August 2022 on loan. He was released from Watford at the end of the 2022–23 season.

On 1 July 2023, McKiernan signed for League Two club Morecambe on a one-year deal. On 7 October McKiernan made history at Morecambe with the club's first ever away hat-trick against Colchester United in a 3–1 win, two of the goals scored after going down to a ten man team.

On 1 July 2024, McKiernan joined Lincoln City on a four-year deal. He made his debut on 10 August, in a 3–2 win against Burton Albion where he started the game. His first goal came in the EFL Trophy against Manchester City U21 on 13 November 2024.

On 10 January 2025, McKiernan joined Burton Albion on loan for the remainder of the season.

On 23 June 2025, McKiernan rejoined Burton Albion on loan for the 2025–26 season. He made his second debut on the opening day of the season, starting the game against Mansfield Town which finised 2–1 to Burton.

On 27 July 2026, McKiernan signed for League One club Bromley for an undisclosed fee, with Lincoln holding a significant future interest in the player.

== International career ==
McKiernan is eligible to represent England and Northern Ireland at international level. He chose to represent Northern Ireland at international level, qualifying through his paternal grandparents. He was selected at 18 to make his debut with Andy Crosby's U21 squad against Finland, obtaining a yellow card in the 21st minute. During the 2023–24 season, McKiernan was called up again for the Northern Ireland U21 2025 Euro Qualifiers.

== Career statistics ==
As of 21 November 2026

Appearances and goals by club, season and competition
Club	Season	League			National cup (Note: Includes FA Cup)		League cup (Note: Includes EFL Cup)		Other		Total	
Club	Season	Division	Apps	Goals	Apps	Goals	Apps	Goals	Apps	Goals	Apps	Goals
Watford	2018–19	Premier League	0	0	0	0	0	0	0	0	0	0
Watford	2019–20	Premier League	0	0	0	0	0	0	0	0	0	0
Watford	2020–21	Championship	0	0	0	0	0	0	0	0	0	0
Watford	2021–22	Premier League	0	0	0	0	0	0	0	0	0	0
Watford	Total		0	0	0	0	0	0	0	0	0	0
Bohemians (loan)	2022	League of Ireland Premier Division	1	0	0	0	—		—		1	0
Eastleigh (loan)	2022–23	National League	41	4	2	0	—		2	1	45	5
Morecambe	2023–24	League Two	28	7	2	0	1	0	2 (Note: Appearance(s) in EFL Trophy)	0	33	7
Lincoln City	2024–25	League One	12	0	2	0	1	0	2	1	17	1
Lincoln City	2025–26	League One	0	0	0	0	0	0	0	0	0	0
Lincoln City	Total		12	0	2	0	1	0	2	1	17	1
Burton Albion (loan)	2024–25	League One	19	1	—		—		—		19	1
Burton Albion (loan)	2025–26	League One	31	1	2	1	0	0	2	0	35	2
Burton Albion (loan)	Total		50	2	2	1	0	0	2	0	54	3
Bromley	2026–27	League One	13	3	1	0	1	0	1	0	16	3
Career total			145	16	9	1	3	0	9	2	166	19
