= Tyrese Shade =

Kittitian footballer (born 2000)

Personal information
- Full name: Tyrese James Shade
- Date of birth: 9 June 2000 (age 26)
- Place of birth: Birmingham, England
- Height: 1.83 m (6 ft 0 in)
- Position: Winger

Team information
- Current team: Portsmouth
- Number: 17

Senior career*
Years	Team	Apps	(Gls)
2016–2017	Solihull Moors	2	(0)
2017–2022	Leicester City	0	(0)
2021–2022	→ Walsall (loan)	39	(2)
2022–2024	Swindon Town	63	(6)
2024	→ Solihull Moors (loan)	12	(2)
2024–2025	Eastleigh	43	(14)
2025–2026	Burton Albion	39	(9)
2026–	Portsmouth	11	(1)

International career^{‡}
- Saint Kitts and Nevis U20
2023–	Saint Kitts and Nevis	9	(0)
- * Club domestic league appearances and goals as of 09:15, 22 November 2026 (UTC) ‡ National team caps and goals as of 16:34, 18 November 2024 (UTC)

Tyrese James Shade (born 9 June 2000) is a professional footballer who plays as a winger for EFL Championship club Portsmouth. Born in England, he represents the Saint Kitts and Nevis national team.

== Club career ==
=== Leicester City ===
Born in Birmingham, Shade began his career with Solihull Moors before joining Leicester City in 2017.

In August 2021, he moved on loan to League Two side Walsall. Shade made his first-team debut on 7 August 2021 in a League Two match against Tranmere Rovers during a 1–0 defeat. He scored his first goal for the club on 18 September 2021, in a 2–1 defeat to Newport County.

In May 2022 he announced that he would be leaving Leicester at the end of his contract in June 2022.

=== Swindon Town ===
In June 2022, it was announced that he would sign for League Two side Swindon Town on 1 July 2022. He made his debut for the club on 30 July 2022, in a 3–0 defeat to Harrogate Town. He scored his first goal for the club on 13 September 2022, in a 3–2 win against Sutton United.

In February 2024, Shade re-joined Solihull Moors on loan for the remainder of the 2023–24 season.

He was released by Swindon at the end of the 2023–24 season.

=== Eastleigh ===
On 30 June 2024, Shade joined National League side Eastleigh. He made his debut for the club on 10 August 2024, in a 2–0 win against Maidenhead United. He scored his first goal for the club on 24 September 2024, in a 2–2 draw with Woking.

=== Burton Albion ===
On 30 July 2025, Shade signed for League One club Burton Albion on an initial two-year deal for an undisclosed fee, a club-record fee received for Eastleigh. He made his debut for the club on 2 August 2025, in a 2–1 win against Mansfield Town. He scored his first goal for the club on 4 October 2025, in a 1–1 draw with Doncaster Rovers.

=== Portsmouth ===
He signed for Portsmouth on 1 September 2026.

== International career ==
Shade is a Saint Kitts and Nevis under-20 international player. He made five appearances for Saint Kitts and Nevis in the 2018 CONCACAF U-20 Championship, scoring three goals. Shade was called up by the Saint Kitts senior team in March 2023, and made his full international debut on 23 March 2023, starting in a 3–1 win over Saint Martin in the CONCACAF Nations League.

== Career statistics ==
=== Club ===
As of match played 21 November 2026

Appearances and goals by club, season and competition
Club	Season	League			FA Cup		EFL Cup		Other		Total	
Club	Season	Division	Apps	Goals	Apps	Goals	Apps	Goals	Apps	Goals	Apps	Goals
Solihull Moors	2016–17	National League	2	0	0	0	—		0	0	2	0
Leicester City U21	2017–18	—			—		—		2 (Note: Appearance(s) in EFL Trophy)	0	2	0
Leicester City U21	2018–19	—			—		—		1	1	1	1
Leicester City U21	2019–20	—			—		—		1	0	1	0
Leicester City U21	2020–21	—			—		—		2	0	2	0
Leicester City U21	Total		—		—		—		6	1	6	1
Leicester City	2021–22	Premier League	0	0	0	0	0	0	0	0	0	0
Walsall (loan)	2021–22	League Two	39	2	2	0	1	0	4	0	46	2
Swindon Town	2022–23	League Two	39	4	1	0	1	0	3	0	44	4
Swindon Town	2023–24	League Two	24	2	1	0	0	0	2	0	27	2
Swindon Town	Total		63	6	2	0	1	0	5	0	71	6
Solihull Moors (loan)	2023–24	National League	12	2	0	0	—		4 (Note: Three appearances in National League play-offs, One appearance in FA Trophy)	0	16	2
Eastleigh	2024–25	National League	43	14	0	0	—		0	0	43	14
Burton Albion	2025–26	League One	38	9	3	5	2	0	1	0	44	14
Burton Albion	2026–27	League One	1	0	0	0	0	0	0	0	1	0
Burton Albion	Total		39	9	3	5	2	0	1	0	45	14
Portsmouth	2026–27	Championship	11	1	0	0	0	0	0	0	11	1
Career total			209	34	7	5	4	0	20	1	240	40

=== International ===
As of match played 18 November 2024

Appearances and goals by national team and year
National team	Year	Apps	Goals
Saint Kitts and Nevis	2023	4	0
Saint Kitts and Nevis	2024	5	0
Total		9	0

== Honours ==
Solihull Moors

- FA Trophy runner-up: 2023–24
