= Kegs Chauke =

South African soccer player (born 2003)

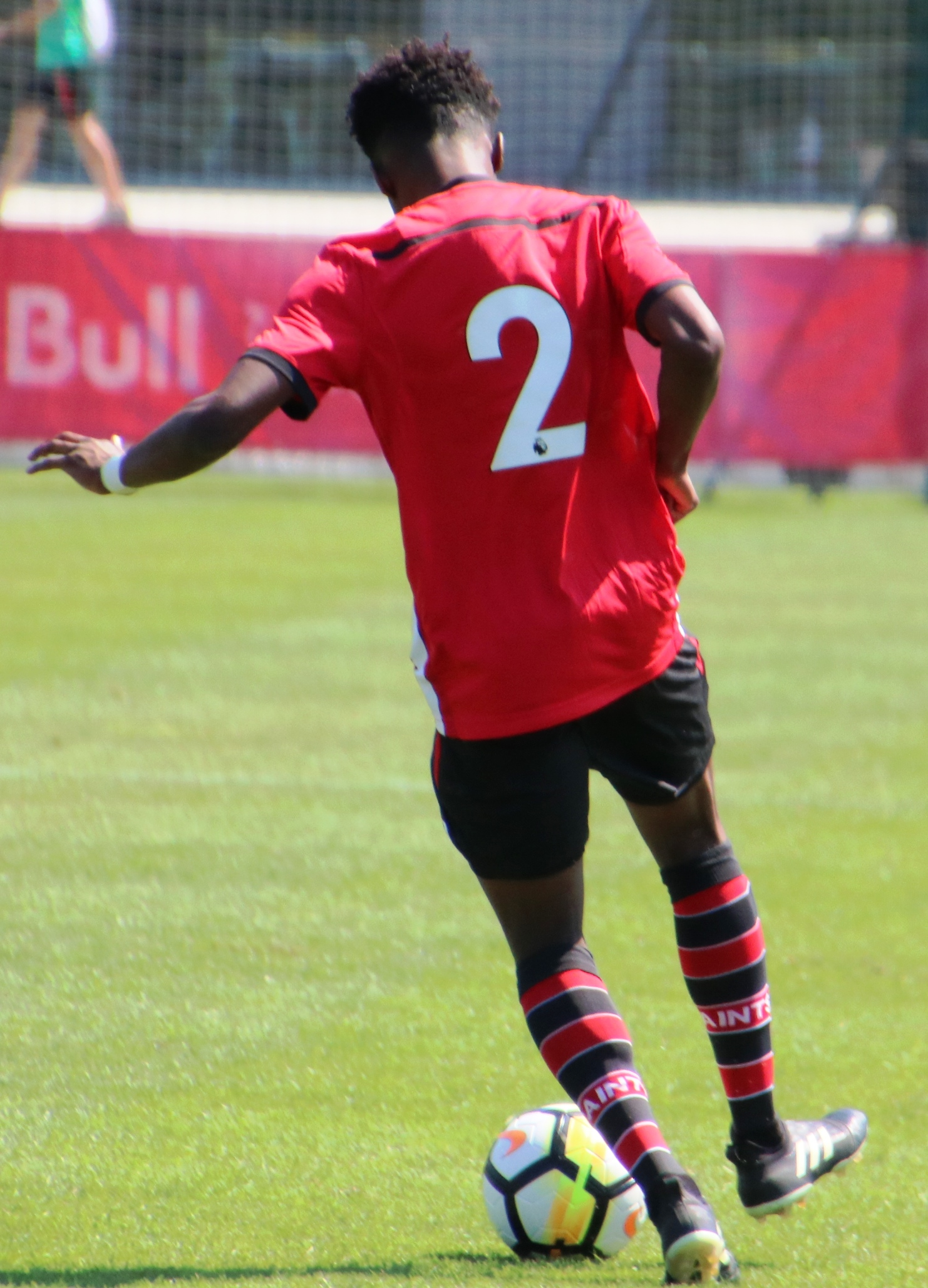
- Kegs Chauke pictured during his time at Southampton's academy

Personal information
- Full name: Kgaogelo Chauke
- Date of birth: 8 January 2003 (age 23)
- Place of birth: Pretoria, South Africa
- Height: 1.77 m (5 ft 10 in)
- Position: Midfielder

Team information
- Current team: Burton Albion
- Number: 4

Youth career
- –2017: Thatcham Town
- 2017–2021: Southampton

Senior career*
Years	Team	Apps	(Gls)
2021–2023	Southampton	0	(0)
2022–2023	→ Exeter City (loan)	20	(0)
2023–	Burton Albion	96	(3)

International career^{‡}
2023	South Africa U23	1	(0)
- * Club domestic league appearances and goals as of 06:47, 17 November 2026 (UTC) ‡ National team caps and goals as of 27 March 2023

Kgaogelo "Kegs" Chauke (born 8 January 2003) is a South African professional soccer player who plays as a midfielder for EFL League One club Burton Albion.

== Club career ==
=== Southampton ===
Having joined Southampton from Thatcham Town in 2017, Chauke signed his first professional contract in January 2020. On 19 January 2021, he made his first professional appearance in a 2–0 victory against Shrewsbury Town in the FA Cup.

==== Loan to Exeter City ====
On 26 July 2022, Chauke signed for EFL League One club Exeter City after impressing as a trialist on a season-long loan deal. He made his debut for the club on 6 August 2022 in a 4–0 victory against Port Vale. On 30 August 2022, Chauke scored his first goal for the club in a 2–1 home defeat to Newport County.

=== Burton Albion ===
On 29 June 2023, Chauke signed a two-year contract with Burton Albion for an undisclosed fee. He made his debut for the club on 9 August 2023 in a 2–0 home defeat against Leicester City in the EFL Cup. During his first season at the club, he made only eight senior appearances.

On 1 January 2025, Chauke scored his first goal for the club in a 2–2 draw against Peterborough United.

On 18 June 2025, Chauke signed a new two-year deal with Burton.

== International career ==
Chauke was born in South Africa and is eligible to represent both South Africa and England internationally. He was named in the England under-18 squad for a training camp in November 2020. In February 2021, Chauke was named in a 78-man preliminary squad representing South Africa at the 2020 Tokyo Olympic games. He was, however, left out of the final squad of 22. He was called up to play for the South Africa U23s for 2023 U-23 Africa Cup of Nations qualification matches in March 2023.

== Career statistics ==
=== Club ===
As of match played 14 November 2026

Appearances and goals by club, season and competition
Club	Season	League			FA Cup		League Cup		Other		Total	
Club	Season	Division	Apps	Goals	Apps	Goals	Apps	Goals	Apps	Goals	Apps	Goals
Southampton	2020–21	Premier League	0	0	1	0	0	0	0	0	1	0
Exeter City (loan)	2022–23	League One	20	0	1	0	2	0	3 (Note: Appearances in EFL Trophy)	2	26	2
Burton Albion	2023–24	League One	5	0	0	0	1	0	2	0	8	0
Burton Albion	2024–25	League One	38	1	1	0	1	0	1	0	41	1
Burton Albion	2025–26	League One	38	0	4	0	0	0	2	0	44	0
Burton Albion	2026–27	League One	15	2	1	0	1	0	0	0	17	2
Burton Albion	Total		96	3	6	0	3	0	5	0	111	3
Career total			116	3	8	0	5	0	8	2	137	5
