= Jack Armer =

Scottish footballer (born 2001)

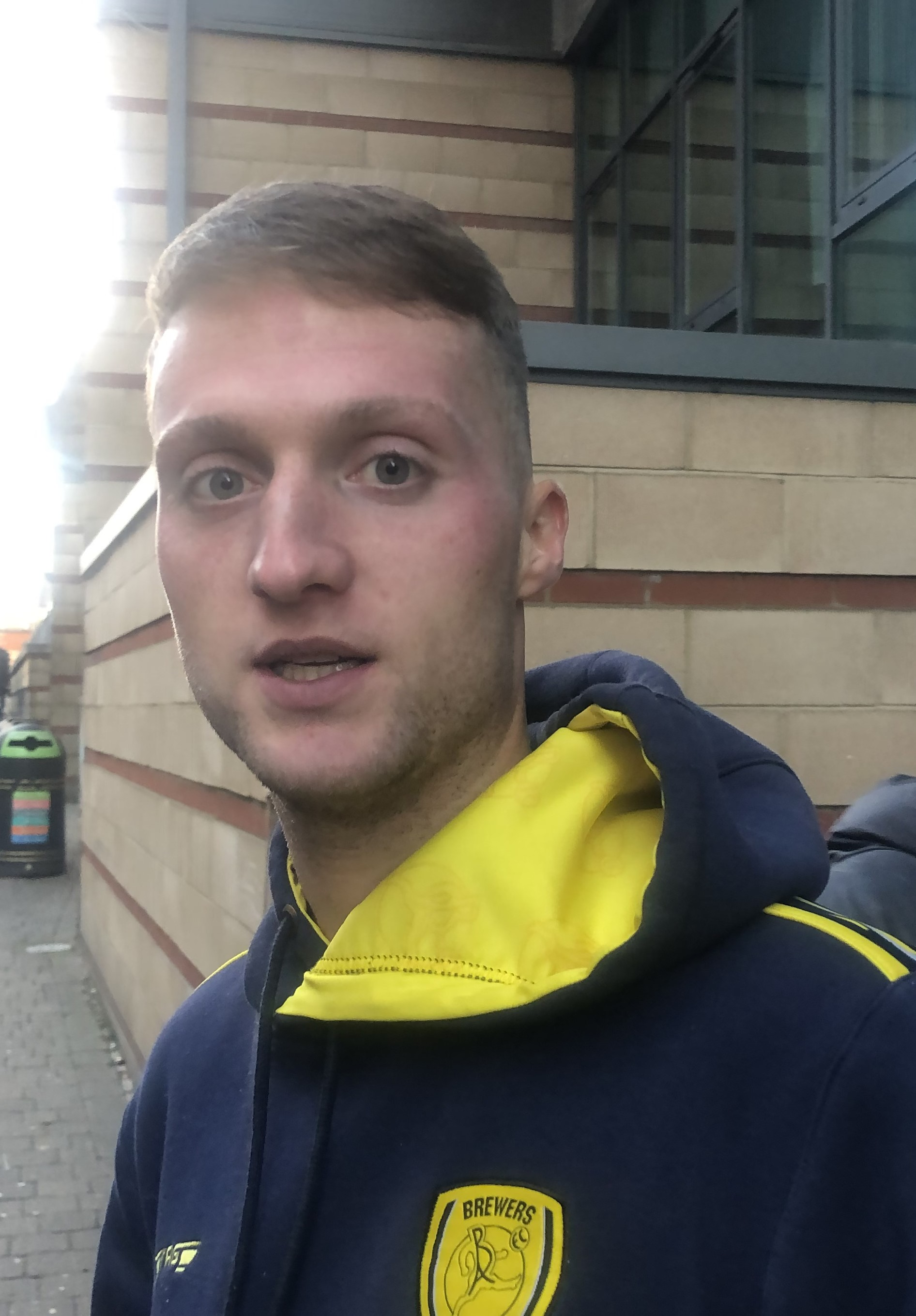
- Armer in 2024.

Personal information
- Full name: Jack Alfred Armer
- Date of birth: 16 April 2001 (age 25)
- Place of birth: Preston, England
- Height: 1.85 m (6 ft 1 in)
- Position: Defender

Team information
- Current team: Burton Albion
- Number: 3

Youth career
- 2008–2019: Preston North End

Senior career*
Years	Team	Apps	(Gls)
2019–2020	Preston North End	0	(0)
2019	→ Lancaster City (loan)	15	(1)
2020	→ Lancaster City (loan)	8	(0)
2020–2024	Carlisle United	152	(4)
2024–	Burton Albion	85	(5)

International career^{‡}
2017–2018	Scotland U17	7	(0)
2018	Scotland U18	1	(0)
2020	Scotland U19	1	(0)
- * Club domestic league appearances and goals as of 16:35, 1 November 2026 (UTC) ‡ National team caps and goals as of 11:41, 6 August 2020 (UTC)

Jack Alfred Armer (born 16 April 2001) is a professional footballer who plays for EFL League One club Burton Albion as a defender. Born in England, he has represented Scotland at youth international level.

== Early and personal life ==
Born in Preston, Armer is from Penwortham and has Scottish descent on his mother's side of the family.

== Club career ==
Armer joined Preston North End at the age of seven and turned professional in May 2019. He moved on loan to Lancaster City in August 2019. After the loan ended in December 2019, he returned to the club for a second loan spell in January 2020.

He was released by Preston at the end of the 2019–20 season, and signed for Carlisle United in August 2020.

On 8 July 2024, Armer joined League One side Burton Albion for an undisclosed fee on a two-year deal with the option for a further season.

On 8 May 2026, the club announced a new one-year deal for the player.

== International career ==
he was called-up but the Scotland under-19 team in February 2020. He had previously played for Scotland at under-17 and under-18 levels.

== Career statistics ==
As of match played 31 October 2026

Appearances and goals by club, season and competition
Club	Season	League			FA Cup		League Cup		Other		Total	
Club	Season	Division	Apps	Goals	Apps	Goals	Apps	Goals	Apps	Goals	Apps	Goals
Preston North End	2019–20	Championship	0	0	0	0	0	0	0	0	0	0
Lancaster City (loan)	2019–20	Northern Premier League Premier Division	23	1	1	0	0	0	3 (Note: Two appearances and one goal in the Lancashire FA Challenge Trophy, and one appearance in the FA Trophy.)	1	27	2
Carlisle United	2020–21	League Two	24	1	1	0	1	0	2	0	28	1
Carlisle United	2021–22	League Two	41	0	2	0	1	0	4	1	48	1
Carlisle United	2022–23	League Two	46	2	2	0	1	0	4	0	53	2
Carlisle United	2023–24	League One	41	1	0	0	1	0	1	0	43	1
Carlisle United	Total		152	4	5	0	4	0	11	1	172	5
Burton Albion	2024–25	League One	38	0	1	0	1	0	2	0	42	0
Burton Albion	2025–26	League One	36	2	4	0	1	0	2	0	43	2
Burton Albion	2026–27	League One	11	3	0	0	1	0	0	0	12	3
Burton Albion	Total		85	5	5	0	3	0	4	0	97	5
Career total			260	10	10	0	7	0	18	2	296	12

== Honours ==
Carlisle United

- EFL League Two play-offs: 2023
