= Finn Delap =

English footballer (born 2005)

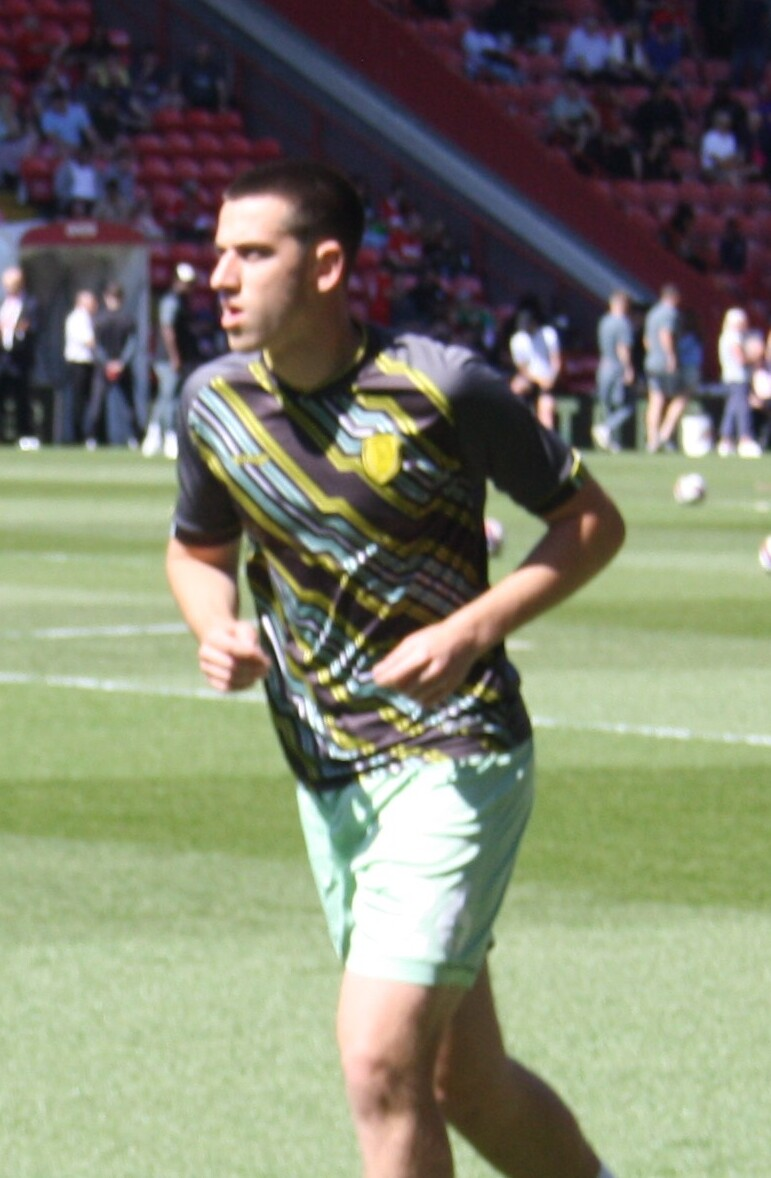
- Delap in 2025

Personal information
- Full name: Finn Anthony Delap
- Date of birth: 9 March 2005 (age 21)
- Place of birth: Winchester, England
- Height: 1.90 m (6 ft 3 in)
- Position: Defender

Team information
- Current team: Burton Albion
- Number: 26

Youth career
- –2021: Derby County
- 2021–2022: Burton Albion

Senior career*
Years	Team	Apps	(Gls)
2022–	Burton Albion	19	(2)
2022–2023	→ Ilkeston Town (loan)	24	(1)
2023–2024	→ Mickleover (loan)	22	(0)
2024	→ Woking (loan)	3	(0)
2024	→ Buxton (loan)	8	(0)
- * Club domestic league appearances and goals as of 12:07, 6 September 2026 (UTC)

Finn Anthony Delap (born 10 June 2005) is an English footballer who plays as a defender for EFL League One club Burton Albion.

== Career ==
Delap joined the Burton Albion academy following his release from Derby County, signing a scholarship in July 2021. He spent time on loan with Southern League Premier Division Central club Ilkeston Town in the 2022–23 season, signing a new contract upon his return to Burton.

In August 2023, Delap joined Mickleover, returning to the club in February 2024, where he signed a new one-year deal. On 10 February 2024, he made his senior debut for the club, coming off of the bench in a victory away at Bristol Rovers. On 12 March 2024, he joined National League side, Woking on loan for the remainder of the campaign. On 7 September 2024, Delap joined National League North side, Buxton on a two-month loan deal. He went onto feature thirteen times in all competitions before returning to Burton Albion in December later that year.

On 19 June 2025, Burton said the player had signed a new two-year deal.

In October 2025, Delap suffered a serious knee injury in a 1–0 away victory over AFC Wimbledon.

== Personal life ==
Delap is the son of former professional footballer Rory Delap, who represented the Republic of Ireland national team. His brother is Nottingham Forest forward Liam Delap.

== Career statistics ==
As of match played 5 September 2026

Appearances and goals by club, season and competition
Club	Season	League			FA Cup		League Cup		Other		Total	
Club	Season	Division	Apps	Goals	Apps	Goals	Apps	Goals	Apps	Goals	Apps	Goals
Burton Albion	2022–23	League One	0	0	0	0	0	0	0	0	0	0
Burton Albion	2023–24	League One	2	0	0	0	0	0	0	0	2	0
Burton Albion	2024–25	League One	5	0	0	0	0	0	1 (Note: Appearance(s) in EFL Trophy)	0	6	0
Burton Albion	2025–26	League One	7	0	0	0	2	0	2	0	11	0
Burton Albion	2026–27	League One	5	2	0	0	1	0	0	0	6	2
Burton Albion	Total		19	2	0	0	3	0	3	0	25	2
Ilkeston Town (loan)	2022–23	Southern League Premier Division Central	24	1	0	0	—		0	0	24	1
Mickleover (loan)	2023–24	Southern League Premier Division Central	22	0	3	1	—		4 (Note: Appearance(s) in FA Trophy)	0	29	1
Woking (loan)	2023–24	National League	3	0	—		—		—		3	0
Buxton (loan)	2024–25	National League North	8	0	4	0	—		1	0	13	0
Career total			75	3	7	1	3	0	8	0	92	4
