= Kyran Lofthouse =

English footballer (born 2000)

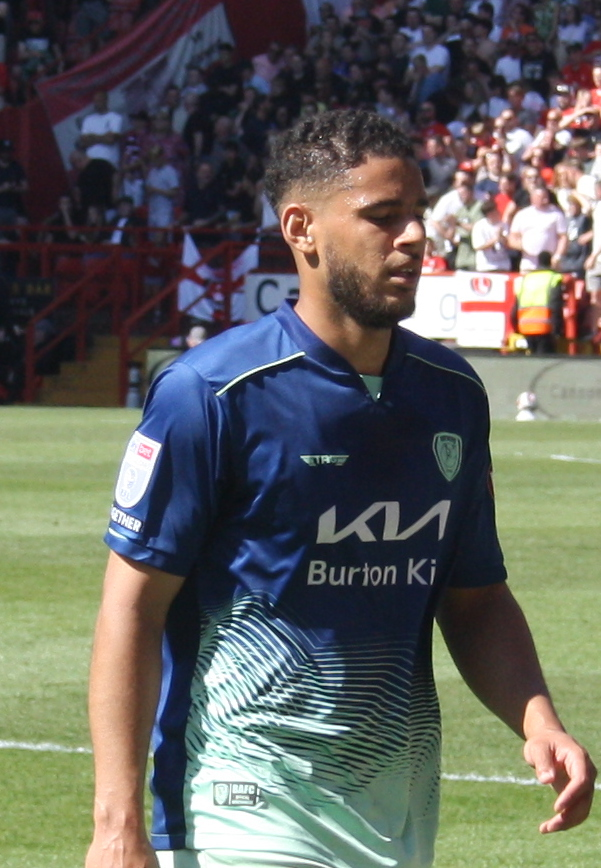
- Lofthouse in 2025

Personal information
- Full name: Kyran Aiden Lofthouse
- Date of birth: 15 September 2000 (age 26)
- Place of birth: Oxford, England
- Height: 6 ft 3 in (1.90 m)
- Positions: Right-back; right midfielder

Team information
- Current team: Burton Albion
- Number: 15

Youth career
- –2019: Oxford United

Senior career*
Years	Team	Apps	(Gls)
2019–2021	Oxford United	0	(0)
2019–2020	→ Oxford City (loan)	15	(3)
2020–2021	→ Woking (loan)	36	(1)
2021–2023	Woking	61	(5)
2023–2025	Barnsley	19	(0)
2023	→ Gateshead (loan)	13	(1)
2024	→ Milton Keynes Dons (loan)	21	(1)
2025	→ Burton Albion (loan)	16	(0)
2025–	Burton Albion	42	(5)
- * Club domestic league appearances and goals as of 16 April 2026 (UTC)

Kyran Aiden Lofthouse (born 15 September 2000) is an English professional footballer who plays as a right-back or right midfielder for EFL League One club Burton Albion.

== Career ==
=== Oxford United ===
Born in Oxford, Lofthouse started his career with Oxford United, making his senior debut in a 2–1 EFL Trophy victory over Norwich City U21 on 3 September 2019.

He joined Oxford City on a one-month loan in November 2019, before his loan was extended by a further two months in December 2019. He returned to the club on another one-month loan in February 2020 after the previous deal expired. He appeared in 15 league matches for City in total, scoring three goals.

In May 2020, he was offered a new one-year contract by Oxford United.

On 26 October 2020, Lofthouse joined National League side Woking on a month-long loan, A day later, he went onto make his debut during a 1–0 away defeat to Boreham Wood, starting the fixture before being replaced by Max Kretzschmar in the 68th minute. His loan was subsequently extended by a further month in December and then again, in January 2021, until the end of the 2020–21 season. Proceeding this, just six days later, Lofthouse went onto score the winning penalty for the Cards during their FA Trophy fourth round penalty shootout triumph over Bromley. On 16 March 2021, Lofthouse registered his first goal for the club in a 1–1 home draw against Altrincham, putting the Cards ahead in the 18th minute before a late equaliser from Josh Hancock in the 92nd minute.

=== Woking ===
On 6 July 2021, Lofthouse returned to Woking on a permanent basis for an undisclosed fee, agreeing to a two-year deal. He made his first appearance of the 2021–22 campaign, during the Cards' 2–1 victory at Wealdstone, featuring for the full 90 minutes. Similarly to his first Woking goal, Lofthouse once again netted against Altrincham this time in February 2022 with a long range effort (which was eventually awarded as the club's goal of the season) to give The Cards a 2–0 lead, with the game ultimately finishing in a 2–2 draw. Within the same month and subsequently manager's, Alan Dowson final game in charge with the Surrey-based side, Lofthouse was forced off with a season-ending injury during their 2–0 defeat to Notts County. On 11 May 2022, Lofthouse was announced as The Woking News and Mail Young Player of the Year for the 2021–22 campaign.

=== Barnsley ===
On 28 July 2023, following his departure from Woking, Lofthouse agreed to join League One club Barnsley on a three-year deal. He made his debut during an EFL Cup tie in early August in a 2–2 draw with Tranmere Rovers.

On 22 September 2023, Lofthouse joined Gateshead on loan until January 2024. On 9 January 2024, he joined League Two club Milton Keynes Dons on loan until the end of the season, linking up again with head coach Mike Williamson who had brought him to Gateshead.

=== Burton Albion ===
On 3 February 2025, Lofthouse joined fellow League One side Burton Albion on loan for the remainder of the season.

On 25 July 2025, Lofthouse returned to the Brewers on a permanent deal for an undisclosed fee, signing an initial two-year deal.

== Career statistics ==
As of 10 January 2026

Appearances and goals by club, season and competition
Club	Season	League			FA Cup		EFL Cup		Other		Total		
Club	Season	Division	Apps	Goals	Apps	Goals	Apps	Goals	Apps	Goals	Apps	Goals	
Oxford United	2019–20	League One	0	0	0	0	0	0	1 (Note: Appearance in the EFL Trophy)	0	1	0	
Oxford United	2020–21	League One	0	0	0	0	1	0	1	0	2	0	
Oxford United	Total		0	0	0	0	1	0	2	0	3	0	
Oxford City (loan)	2019–20	National League South	15	3	—		—		2 (Note: Appearances in the FA Trophy)	0	17	3	
Woking (loan)	2020–21	National League	36	1	0	0	—		5	0	41	1	
Woking	2021–22	National League	29	1	1	0	—		0	0	30	1	
Woking	2022–23	National League	36	4	2	0	—		2 (Note: Appearances in FA Trophy, and 2022–23 National League play-offs)	0	40	4	
Woking	Total		65	5	3	0	—		2	0	70	5	
Barnsley	2023–24	League One	1	0	0	0	1	0	1	0	3	0	
Barnsley	2024–25	League One	18	0	1	0	3	0	3	0	25	0	
Barnsley	Total			19	0	1	0	4	0	4	0	28	0
Gateshead (loan)	2023–24	National League	13	1	2	0	—		1	0	16	1	
Milton Keynes Dons (loan)	2023–24	League Two	21	1	—		—		2 (Note: Appearances in 2023–24 EFL League Two play-offs)	0	23	1	
Burton Albion (loan)	2024–25	League One	16	0	0	0	0	0	0	0	16	0	
Burton Albion	2025–26	League One	23	1	3	1	1	0	1	0	28	2	
Career total			208	12	9	1	6	0	19	0	242	13	
