= Kain Adom =

English footballer (born 2001)

Personal information
- Full name: Kain James Kofi Adom
- Date of birth: 7 September 2001 (age 25)
- Place of birth: Kensington and Chelsea, England
- Height: 1.86 m (6 ft 1 in)
- Position: Forward

Team information
- Current team: Burton Albion
- Number: 29

Senior career*
Years	Team	Apps	(Gls)
2020–2021	Staines Town	7	(2)
2022	Ashford Town	15	(1)
2022–2023	Hanwell Town	36	(11)
2023–2024	Welling United	23	(7)
2024–2026	Gateshead	65	(13)
2025	→ AFC Fylde (loan)	5	(0)
2025	→ Sutton United (loan)	7	(0)
2026–	Burton Albion	27	(1)
- * Club domestic league appearances and goals as of 16:10, Thursday November 19th 2026 (GMT)

Kain James Kofi Adom (born 7 September 2001) is an English professional footballer who plays as a forward for EFL League One club Burton Albion.

== Career ==
Adom started his non-league career with Staines Town and Ashford Town, before an impressive 2022–23 season with Hanwell Town. In July 2023, Adom joined National League South side Welling United on non-contract terms following a successful trial period.

=== Gateshead ===
In January 2024, Adom joined National League club Gateshead.

In February 2025, he joined fellow National League side AFC Fylde on loan for the remainder of the season. The following month, his loan was terminated to allow him to be loaned out to Sutton United for the remainder of the season.

Adom started the 2025–26 season in impressive form, being named the club's player of the month for August following four goals in eight games. Having struggled to find consistent game-time under previous managers, often deployed at right wing-back, he continued to impress manager Alun Armstrong in a more attacking role.

=== Burton Albion ===
On 9 January 2026, Adom signed for League One club Burton Albion on an initial eighteen-month contract for an undisclosed fee. He made his debut the following day, assisting his side's first goal in a 5–0 FA Cup Third Round thrashing of Boreham Wood.

== Career statistics ==
As of match played 10 January 2026

Appearances and goals by club, season and competition
Club	Season	League			FA Cup		League Cup		Other		Total	
Club	Season	Division	Apps	Goals	Apps	Goals	Apps	Goals	Apps	Goals	Apps	Goals
Staines Town	2020–21	Isthmian League South Central Division	7	2	1	0	—		1 (Note: Appearance(s) in FA Trophy)	0	9	2
Ashford Town	2021–22	Isthmian League South Central Division	15	1	0	0	—		2 (Note: Appearance(s) in Surrey Senior Cup)	3	17	4
Hanwell Town	2022–23	Southern League Premier Division South	36	11	1	1	—		5 (Note: Three appearances in FA Trophy, one appearance in Middlesex Senior Cup, one appearance in Middlesex Senior Charity Cup)	0	42	12
Welling United	2023–24	National League South	23	7	3	1	—		2	1	28	9
Gateshead	2023–24	National League	20	2	0	0	—		0	0	20	2
Gateshead	2024–25	National League	22	1	2	0	—		0	0	24	1
Gateshead	2025–26	National League	23	10	2	1	—		1	0	26	11
Gateshead	Total		65	13	4	1	0	0	1	0	70	14
AFC Fylde (loan)	2024–25	National League	5	0	0	0	—		0	0	5	0
Sutton United (loan)	2024–25	National League	7	0	0	0	—		0	0	7	0
Burton Albion	2025–26	League One	0	0	1	0	0	0	0	0	1	0
Career total			158	34	10	3	0	0	11	4	179	41
