= Wouter Gudde =

Dutch footballer

Personal information
- Full name: Wouter Henricus Gudde
- Date of birth: 5 August 1984 (age 42)
- Place of birth: Schiedam, Netherlands
- Height: 1.86 m (6 ft 1 in)
- Position: Defender

Team information
- Current team: Burton Albion (chairman)

Youth career
- Excelsior Maassluis
- Feyenoord

Senior career*
Years	Team	Apps	(Gls)
2004–2007	Sparta	73	(1)
2008–2010	RKC	69	(3)
2010–2011	Excelsior	17	(1)
Total		159	(5)
- * Club domestic league appearances and goals as of 13 July 2016

Wouter Gudde (born 5 August 1984) is a Dutch football executive and retired player. He is the interim chairman at English third-tier club Burton Albion.

== Playing career ==
Gudde is a defender who was born in Schiedam and raised in Maassluis and made his debut in professional football, being part of the Sparta Rotterdam squad in the 2004–05 season. He had played for amateur side Excelsior Maassluis before joining Sparta. He joined RKC in 2008. He finished his playing career in 2011 at Excelsior where injury cut short his career.

== Executive career ==
After retiring as a player, Gudde became commercial director at former club Excelsior. He left his position in April 2019 to become Managing Director at FC Groningen. He left the club in 2024.

In May 2025, Gudde was named temporary chairman and CEO at Burton Albion.

== Personal life ==
His father Eric Gudde was for 10 years the head coach at Excelsior Maassluis and 10 years general manager at Feyenoord.
