= Sulyman Krubally =

Spanish footballer (born 2008)

Personal information
- Full name: Sulyman Krubally Sankareh
- Date of birth: 29 August 2008 (age 18)
- Place of birth: Spain
- Height: 1.79 m (5 ft 10 in)
- Position: Midfielder

Team information
- Current team: Burton Albion
- Number: 41

Youth career
- 2020–2025: Burton Albion

Senior career*
Years	Team	Apps	(Gls)
2025–	Burton Albion	19	(0)
- * Club domestic league appearances and goals as of 13:52, 15 April 2026 (UTC)

Sulyman Krubally Sankareh (born 29 August 2008) is a Spanish professional footballer who plays as a midfielder for EFL League One club Burton Albion.

== Club career ==
Krubally is a youth product of Burton Albion since the under-13's. At 16 years and 355 days old, he became Burton Albion's youngest ever competitive debutant in a 1–1 (5–4) EFL Cup penalty shootout win over Tranmere Rovers on 19 August 2025. He made his league debut with Burton Albion as a substitute in a 2–1 EFL League One loss to Stockport County on 23 August 2025. He signed his first professional contract with the club on 22 October 2025 until 2027, with an option to extend for another year. On 20 April 2026, he was the 2026 League One Apprentice of the Season.

== Honours ==
Individual

- EFL League One Apprentice of the Season: 2026
