= Darren Stride =

English footballer

Personal information
- Full name: Darren Stride
- Date of birth: 28 September 1975 (age 51)
- Place of birth: Burton upon Trent, England
- Position: Utility player

Senior career*
Years	Team	Apps	(Gls)
1993–2010	Burton Albion	654	(124)
2010–2011	Alfreton Town	16	(0)
2011–2012	Chasetown	23	(1)
Total		693	(125)
- * Club domestic league appearances and goals

Darren Stride (born 28 September 1975) is an English former professional association football footballer.

Playing as a central defender or in other utility roles including centre forward, Stride captained the Burton Albion side for 12 years.

Stride has recently completed his coaching qualifications and is looking to move into management.

== Career ==
Stride had been part of the first team since progressing from the Burton youth team, and had subsequently become the club's record holder for most appearances. He had also played in every single position during his time at the club, including as an emergency goalkeeper.

Stride was released at the end of the 2009–10 after 17 years with the club. He subsequently joined Alfreton Town on a one-year deal in August 2010. Stride captained Alfreton on his debut, a 1–0 win against Hinckley United. Stride and Alfreton Town went on to win the Conference North however he was released at the end of the season, after which he signed for Chasetown.

Stride made 23 appearances for Chasetown, scoring one goal, before leaving the club in 2012.

== Honours ==
with Burton Albion

- Northern Premier League: 2002
- Conference National: 2009

with Alfreton Town

- Conference North: 2011
