= Reg Weston =

English footballer and manager

Personal information
- Full name: Reginald Harold Weston
- Date of birth: 16 January 1918
- Place of birth: Greenhithe, England
- Date of death: 17 February 1998 (aged 80)
- Place of death: Burton-on-Trent, England
- Position: Centre half

Senior career*
Years	Team	Apps	(Gls)
- Northfleet
1946–1952	Swansea Town	229	(1)
1952	Derby County		

International career
	Wales		(1)
- * Club domestic league appearances and goals

Reginald Weston (16 January 1918 – 17 February 1998) was an English professional footballer who played as a centre half for Northfleet and Swansea Town. He also appeared for the Wales national football team, and managed Burton Albion.
