= Burton Albion F.C. =

Association football club in England

Burton Albion
- Full name: Burton Albion Football Club
- Nicknames: The Brewers; The Yellow and Black Army
- Founded: 6 July 1950; 76 years ago
- Ground: Pirelli Stadium
- Capacity: 6,912
- Owner: Nordic Football Group
- Chairman: Wouter Gudde (Interim)
- Manager: Gary Bowyer
- League: EFL League One
- 2025–26: EFL League One, 17th of 24
- Website: burtonalbionfc.co.uk
Home colours	Away colours	Third colours

Burton Albion Football Club is a professional association football club in the town of Burton upon Trent, Staffordshire, England. The team competes in League One, the third level of the English football league system. The club moved its home ground in 2005 to the Pirelli Stadium from Eton Park. The club's nickname, The Brewers, evokes the brewing heritage of Burton upon Trent.

Burton Albion were formed in 1950 and initially joined the Birmingham & District League before switching to the Southern League eight years later. They were promoted from the Southern League Division One in 1965–66, 1971–72 and 1973–74 and were relegated from the Southern League Premier Division in 1970, 1973 and 1977. Burton spent 1979 to 1987 in the Northern Premier League, before reverting to the Southern League Premier Division. The club rejoined the Northern Premier League in 2001 and were promoted to the Conference as Northern Premier League champions in 2001–02.

Nigel Clough spent seven seasons as the club's player-manager in the Conference and then led them into the Football League as champions of the Conference in 2008–09. They lost the 2014 League Two play-off final, but went on to win the League Two title in 2014–15 and were promoted from League One in 2015–16. Burton spent two seasons in the Championship until relegation in 2018.

== History ==
=== 1950–1998: early years ===
Burton Albion were formed in 1950, and joined the Birmingham & District League. They finished the 1953–54 season as runners-up, and in 1958–59 joined the Southern League North Western zone. In 1965–66, Burton missed out on the runners-up place on goal difference, but were still promoted to the Southern League Premier Division. They avoided relegation in 1968, due to Stevenage Town folding, but were relegated to Division One after an unsuccessful 1969–70 season.

Burton missed out on promotion on goal average in 1970–71, but finished as runners-up the following season and were promoted back to the Premier Division. The next two seasons saw them relegated, and then promoted back to the Premier Division again. They stayed in the same division until being relegated once more at the end of 1976–77. League rearrangements saw Burton moved to the Northern Premier League, because of their location in the central Midlands, and then back to the Southern League in 1987–88, the season after losing in a replayed FA Trophy Final to Kidderminster Harriers.

=== Into the new millennium ===
In October 1998, Nigel Clough was appointed as player-manager and he led the club to two successive runners-up spots, in 1999–2000 and 2000–01. Burton were again moved to the Northern Premier League Premier Division in 2001–02, which they won by a margin of 15 points, scoring 106 goals in the process. The club were promoted to the Football Conference for the first time.

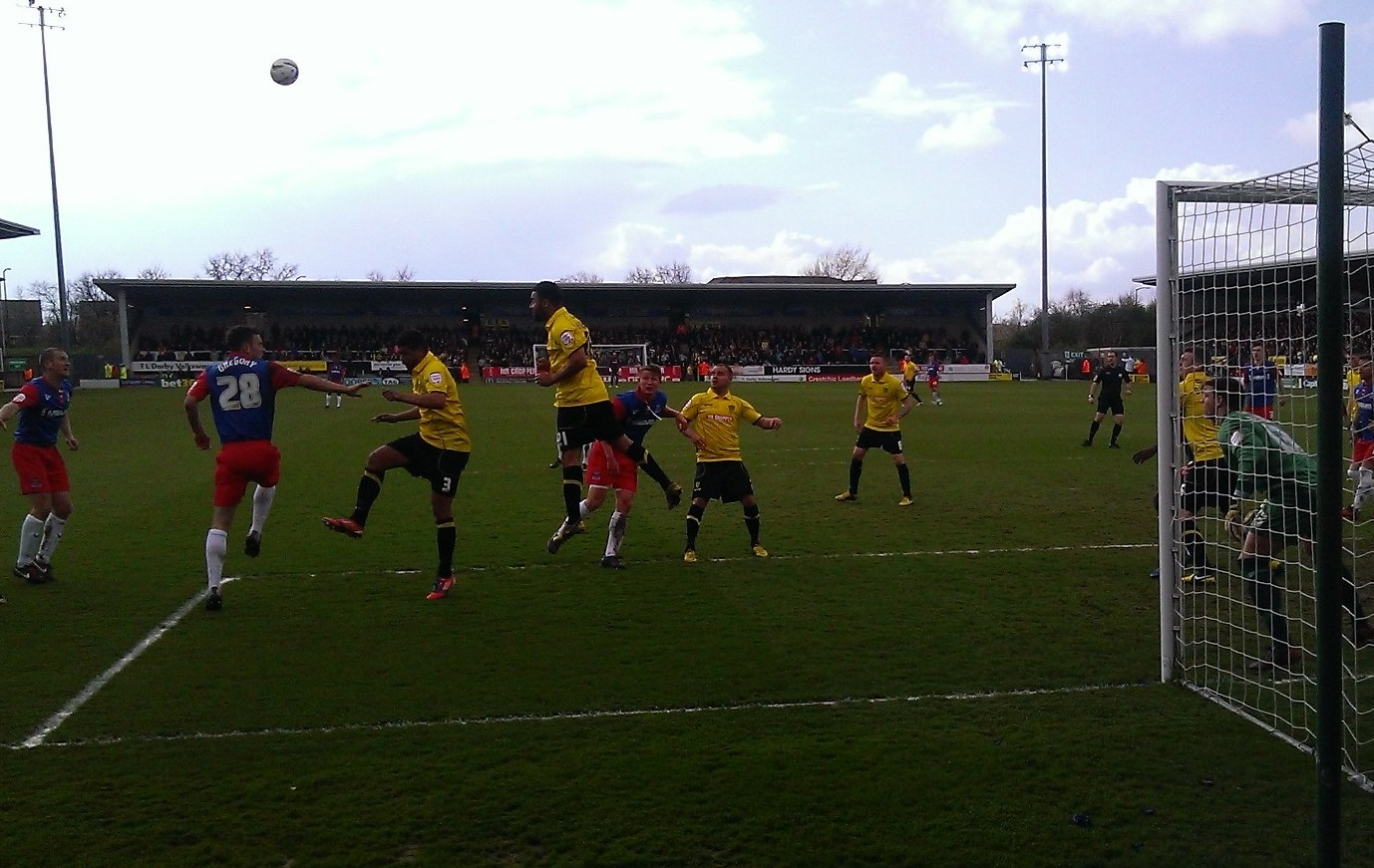
Albion in action against Gillingham in the final match of the 2012–13 season

The club was brought to national attention when they were drawn at home against eleven-times winners Manchester United in the third round of the 2005–06 FA Cup. The Brewers held the Premier League team to a 0–0 draw at home, but lost the replay 5–0 in front of over 11,000 Burton fans, setting a record for number of away fans at Old Trafford.

=== 2009–present: Football League ===
In January 2009, with Burton 13 points clear at the top of the table, Clough left the club to become the manager of Derby County, with Roy McFarland installed as caretaker manager until the end of the season. Despite this managerial change, Burton went on to set a league record for the most consecutive wins, and in February 2009, when the team was 19 points clear at the top of the table, Conference sponsors Blue Square declared Burton the winners of the 2008–09 title in a public relations stunt, in which they paid out all bets. Following that announcement, the club saw their lead reduced week by week, but secured promotion to the Football League in the final game of the season, despite losing 2–1 away to Torquay United, when Cambridge United could only manage a goalless draw to Altrincham. At the end of the season Roy McFarland left the club and was replaced by Paul Peschisolido, with Gary Rowett acting as his assistant.

Burton's first win in the Football League was 5–2 against Morecambe at the Pirelli Stadium, and they finished 13th in their first campaign in the Football League. In their second season, Burton claimed a notable scalp in the FA Cup third round when they knocked out championship team Middlesbrough 2–1 at the Pirelli Stadium. In the league, Burton experienced a 17-game winless run and fell from fifth place on Boxing Day to 17th place at the end of the 2011–12 season, which led to the sacking of Peschisolido.

Chart of yearly table positions of Burton Albion in the football league.

Gary Rowett was appointed as the new manager of Burton in May 2012. In his first full season in charge, he led Burton to a fourth-place finish and the play-offs, missing out on automatic promotion by two points. Burton lost their play-off semi-final 4–5 on aggregate to Bradford City despite winning the first leg 3–2 at Valley Parade. In the 2013–14 season, Burton finished sixth, reaching the play-off final in which they lost 1–0 against Fleetwood Town.

During the 2014–15 season, Rowett left to join Birmingham City, and was replaced by Jimmy Floyd Hasselbaink. Under Hasselbaink, the Brewers won League Two and were promoted to League One for the first time in their history. Hasselbaink left by mutual consent in December 2015 to join Queens Park Rangers as manager. Clough returned to Burton to replace him for his second spell as manager and led the club to a second-place finish in the league, earning promotion to the Football League Championship, another first for Burton.

The Brewers opened their first season in the championship with a 4–3 loss to local rivals Nottingham Forest. Burton went on a six-match streak without losing between 18 February and 18 March, beginning with a 2–1 win at home to ex-Premier League opponents Norwich City and culminating in a 3–5 defeat to Brentford and including a 1–0 win over Nottingham Forest in the reverse fixture. Burton secured their championship status on 29 April 2017 after a 1–1 draw with Barnsley. Burton spent much of their second season in the championship in the relegation zone. three wins in the late stage of the season boosted their chances of survival, including a 2–1 win over relegation rivals Sunderland. However, following a 2–1 defeat to Preston North End on the final day of the season, Burton were relegated back to League One.

In 2018–19, in spite of being in mid-table in League One, they made the semi-finals of the EFL Cup, after wins over Shrewsbury Town, Aston Villa, Burnley, Nottingham Forest and Middlesbrough. Facing Manchester City, Burton lost the first leg 9–0 at the Etihad Stadium, eventually losing 10–0 on aggregate.

2019–20 saw Burton reach the fourth round of the EFL Cup, defeating Premier League club AFC Bournemouth before losing 3–1 at home to Leicester City. The final nine games of the season would be permanently suspended due to the COVID-19 pandemic, with Burton finishing the season in 12th place. The summer of 2020 saw significant change with Nigel Clough stepping down as manager, bringing to an end a 228-game long second spell at the club and surpassing 900 games in total with the Brewers. His successor, Jake Buxton, struggled to fill the void and was sacked on 29 December 2020 after winning just two of his 21 league matches, and with Burton sat six points from safety at the bottom of the League One table. The club would soon respond by announcing the return of Jimmy Floyd Hasselbaink as manager. Tasked with securing survival, the new management team completed a remarkable turnaround, climbing out of the relegation zone by the start of March and finishing 16th, 10 points above the bottom four. The turnaround included a club-record run of six consecutive EFL victories.

After a disastrous start to 2022–23, Hasselbaink resigned as Burton Albion manager. Dino Maamria took over the reins of a club that had just one point after seven matches, successfully guiding the club to survival in 15th place.

Dino Maamria's tenure as manager would end in December 2023, and was succeeded by Martin Paterson. The Brewers ultimately avoided relegation on the final day of the season, however, Paterson would depart the club at the end of the season. with first team coaches Gary Mills and John Dreyer also departing the same day.

In June 2024, Chairman Ben Robinson sold the entire majority stake in the football club to the Nordic Football Group (NFG). NFG's acquisition of Burton Albion includes a large group of investors from the Nordic countries. The following day, NFG made their first appointment, announcing the arrival of Chelsea U21 head coach Mark Robinson. After a poor start of 11 league games without a win, Robinson was sacked and replaced with interim boss Tom Hounsell, who picked up the clubs first league win of the season at the 14th attempt and after 3 months of trying

The 2025–26 season saw Burton reach the fourth round of the FA Cup for just the second time in their history, rewarding them a tie at home to West Ham United.

== Stadium ==
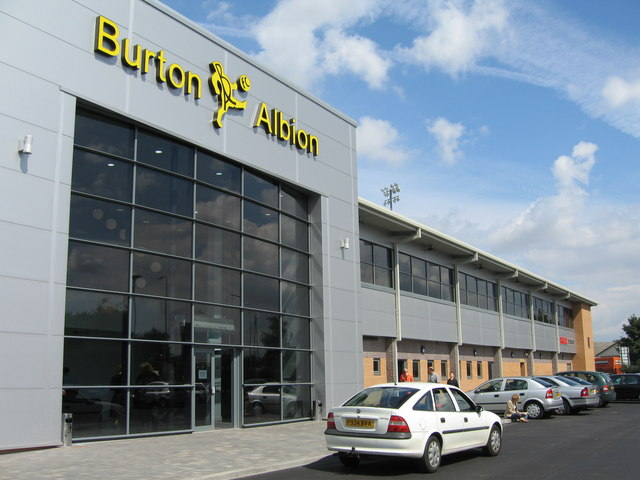
Pirelli Stadium

Albion began life at the Lloyds Foundry ground on Wellington Street, but high attendances meant that the club quickly searched for a more suitable home. Eton Park was built off Derby Road and officially opened on 20 September 1958, coinciding with the club's promotion to the Southern League. Until its demolition in 2005, the Brewers played all their home games at Eton Park.

The Pirelli Stadium on Princess Way was built in 2005 and is the current home of the Brewers, replacing Eton Park, also on the same road, which was demolished and developed into housing. The ground cost £7.2 million to build, and was built on the former site of the Pirelli UK Tyres Ltd Sports & Social Club. The land was donated to the club by Pirelli in return for naming rights.

The ground was designed by architect Jon Hawkeye, and has served as the inspiration for numerous newer grounds, including Morecambe's Globe Arena and the proposed Hayes & Yeading stadium. It gained its most recent safety certificate from Staffordshire County Council on 12 July 2010, having been subject to crowd trouble on 8 May 2010 at the hands of Grimsby Town fans following their relegation from Football League Two.

The Pirelli Stadium has seen minor capacity changes since its construction, and the current capacity is 6,912, with 2,034 being seated in the South (Main) Stand. The current record attendance for the stadium stands at 6,746 for an EFL Championship match against Derby County on 26 August 2016. Previous records include 6,192 for a Conference National 1–0 defeat against Oxford United, during the club's title-winning season, and 6,191 for an FA Cup third-round match on 8 January 2006 against Manchester United.

The stadium also hosts the National ISFA Under-13 tournament final.

== Rivalries ==
In their non-League days the Brewers' local rivals were Gresley Rovers, Nuneaton Borough, Stafford Rangers and Tamworth. However, since the club's rise to the Football League these rivalries have become less intense.

Following promotion to the Football League, local rivalries with Port Vale, Notts County, Chesterfield and Walsall have arisen. Except for Notts County, all these clubs had been rivals to Albion's predecessor club, Burton United, in the early 1900s. There is also a largely friendly rivalry with near neighbours Derby County, partly because of the shared fanbase, but particularly following the transfer of manager Nigel Clough to the championship club in 2009 and the arrival of several ex-Derby players during the Paul Peschisolido era.

Their 2016 promotion into the championship resulted in matches with local big clubs Aston Villa, Birmingham City, Nottingham Forest and Wolverhampton Wanderers.

== Players ==
As of 2 September 2026

=== First-team squad ===
Note: Flags indicate national team as defined under FIFA eligibility rules; some limited exceptions apply. Players may hold more than one non-FIFA nationality.

No.	Pos.	Nation	Player
3	DF	SCO	Jack Armer
4	MF	RSA	Kegs Chauke
6	DF	UGA	Toby Sibbick
8	MF	ENG	Charlie Webster
9	FW	IRL	Gbemi Arubi
10	FW	IRL	Mark O'Mahony (on loan from Brighton & Hove Albion)
12	MF	ENG	George Evans
14	MF	ENG	Will Collar (on loan from Milton Keynes Dons)
15	DF	ENG	Kyran Lofthouse
16	DF	JAM	Curtis Tilt (captain)
17	FW	AUS	Raphael Borges Rodrigues (on loan from Coventry City)
18	FW	ENG	Caylan Vickers
19	FW	ENG	Matthew Dennis

No.	Pos.	Nation	Player
20	DF	ENG	Jason Sraha
23	DF	ENG	Emeka Adiele (on loan from Utrecht)
24	DF	ENG	Harvey Araujo
25	MF	IRL	Ciaran Gilligan
26	DF	ENG	Finn Delap
27	GK	POL	Kamil Dudek
28	FW	ENG	Millar Matthews-Lewis
29	FW	ENG	Kain Adom
31	DF	WAL	Joe Lewis
34	GK	ENG	Corey Addai (on loan from Stockport County)
40	FW	ENG	Zac Scutt
41	MF	ESP	Sulyman Krubally

=== U18 squad ===
Note: Flags indicate national team as defined under FIFA eligibility rules; some limited exceptions apply. Players may hold more than one non-FIFA nationality.

No.	Pos.	Nation	Player
50	MF	ENG	Jack Willow
52	MF	ENG	Miles Henry
53	MF	ENG	Caden Gilbert
54	FW	ENG	Robbie Meakin
55	MF	ENG	Kairo Piper
56	DF	ENG	William Earley

No.	Pos.	Nation	Player
57	FW	ENG	Will Hetheridge
58	GK	ENG	James Oliver
59	DF	ENG	Daniel Jones
60	MF	ENG	Samuel Oyemade
61	MF	ENG	Reuben Kelle

=== Player of the Year ===
As voted for by supporters of the club.

- 1971 (England) Bobby Goodwin
- 1972 (England) Phil Annable
- 1973 (England) John Beresford
- 1974 (England) Frank Gregg
- 1975 (England) Phil Annable
- 1976 (Jamaica) Brendon Phillips
- 1977 (England) Phil Annable
- 1978 (England) Barry Alcock
- 1979 (England) Phil Annable
- 1980 (England) Ken Blair
- 1981 (England) Bryan Kent
- 1982 (England) Bob Gauden
- 1983 (England) Clive Arthur
- 1984 (England) Paul Evans
- 1985 (England) Doug Newton
- 1986 (England) Alan Kamara
- 1987 (England) Alan Kamara
- 1988 (England) Ian Straw
- 1989 (England) Nick Goodwin
- 1990 (England) Nick Goodwin
- 1991 (England) Mark Owen
- 1992 (England) Nick Goodwin
- 1993 (Scotland) Alan Kurila
- 1994 (England) Nicholas Harlow
- 1995 (England) Darren Acton
- 1996 (England) Matt Smith
- 1997 (England) Simon Redfern
- 1998 (England) Mark Blount
- 1999 (England) Mark Blount
- 2000 (England) Darren Stride
- 2001 (England) Darren Wassall
- 2002 (England) Darren Stride
- 2003 (England) Matt Duke^{1}
- 2003 (England) Christian Moore^{1}
- 2004 (England) Aaron Webster
- 2005 (England) Andrew Corbett
- 2006 (Wales) Darren Tinson
- 2007 (England) Kevin Poole
- 2008 (Republic of Ireland) John McGrath
- 2009 (England) Jake Buxton
- 2010 (Wales) Tony James
- 2011 (England) Adam Legzdins
- 2012 (Democratic Republic of the Congo) Calvin Zola
- 2013 (England) Lee Bell
- 2014 (England) Ian Sharps
- 2015 (England) Stuart Beavon
- 2016 (England) Stuart Beavon
- 2017 (Australia) Jackson Irvine
- 2018 (England) Lucas Akins
- 2019 (England) Lucas Akins
- 2021 (Australia) Ryan Edwards
- 2022 (England) John Brayford
- 2023 (England) Sam Hughes
- 2024 (New Zealand) Max Crocombe
- 2025 (Republic of Ireland) Ryan Sweeney
- 2026 (England) Kyran Lofthouse

^{1} Matt Duke and Christian Moore joint recipients of 2003 award.

== Backroom staff ==
=== Club officials ===
Position	Staff
Interim Chairman	(Netherlands) Wouter Gudde
Sporting Director	(Wales) Richie Dorman
Chief Operating Officer	(Northern Ireland) Tom Mahon
Chief Financial Officer	(China) Henry Pu
Head of Football Operations	(England) Baillie Coupland
Head of Ticketing	(England) Jodie Carter
Head of Stadium Operations	(England) Paul Calladine
Head of Communications	(England) Chris Deacon
Head of Community	(England) Dominic Anderson
Head of Sales	(England) Jordan Worthington

Position	Name
Manager	(England) Gary Bowyer
Assistant Manager	(England) Pat Lyons
First Team Coach	(England) John Brayford
Head of Goalkeeping	(England) Jake Kean
Head of Sports Science	(England) Alfie O’neill
Sports Scientist	(England) Thomas Reddy
Analyst	(England) Jacob Shakles
Analyst	(England) Ollie Elliott
Head of Medical	(England) Theo Elson
Sports Therapist	(England) Kade Gerrard
Sports Therapist	(England) Roman Morgan
Kit Manager	(England) Harry Bryan

== Records and statistics ==
=== Appearance records ===
Most appearances

As of 15 June 2012 (competitive matches only):

#	Name	Career	Apps	Goals	Source
1	(England) Darren Stride	1993–2010	646	124	
2	(England) Aaron Webster	1998–2013	588	100	
3	(England) Phil Annable	1970–80, 1981–83	567	70	
4	(England) Nigel Simms	1981–1993	535	11	
5	(England) Nick Goodwin	1988–95, 1997–99	508	0	

Most Football League appearances

As of 23 April 2020. (Football League matches only):

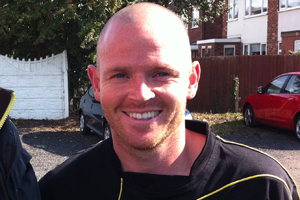
John McGrath, 123 Football League appearances.

#	Name	Career	Apps	Goals
1	(England) Lucas Akins	2014–2022	307	65
2	(Republic of Ireland) Damian McCrory	2012–2019	196	10
3	(Northern Ireland) Robbie Weir	2012–2016	160	7
4	(Democratic Republic of the Congo) Jacques Maghoma	2009–2013	155	26
5	(Scotland) Jon Mclaughlin	2014–2017	113	0
6	(Republic of Ireland) John McGrath	2007–2013	123	4
7	(England) Andrew Corbett	2003–2013	123	2
8	(England) Jimmy Phillips	2009–2015	121	5
9	(England) John Mousinho	2014–2017	118	2
10	(England) Aaron Webster	1998–2013	108	18

Appearances and goals count for Football League only.
Source: Burton Albion, Football League

=== Goalscoring records ===
Top goalscorers

As of 20 September 2010 (competitive matches only):

#	Name	Career	Goals	Apps	Average	Source
1	(England) Richie Barker	1960–62, 1963–67	159	270	0.58	
2	(England) Stan Round	1963–67	149	199	0.75	
3	(England) Darren Stride	1993–2010	124	646	0.19	
4	(England) Aaron Webster	1998–2013	101	588	0.17	
5	(England) Simon Redfern	1987–97	86	457	0.19	

Top Football League goalscorers

As of 16 July 2022, goals not appearances, they are since 23 April 2017 (Football League matches only):

#	Name	Career	Apps	Goals
1	(England) Lucas Akins	2014–2022	307	65
2	(Northern Ireland) Billy Kee	2011–2014	95	39
3	(England) Shaun Harrad	2005–2011	62	31
4	(Democratic Republic of the Congo) Jacques Maghoma	2009–2013	155	26
5	(Democratic Republic of the Congo) Calvin Zola	2010–2013	79	25
6	(England) Greg Pearson	2008–2012	89	19
7	(England) Aaron Webster	1998–2013	108	18
8	(Northern Ireland) Adam McGurk	2013–2015	71	15
9	(England) Stuart Beavon	2014–2017	97	13
10	(England) Justin Richards	2011–2013	48	12

Appearances and goals count for Football League only.
Source: Burton Albion, The Football League

Other goalscoring records

- Most goals in a season: Stan Round – 59 (1965–66)
- Most goals in Football League season – Shaun Harrad – 21 (2009–10)
- Most hat-tricks: Stan Round – 12
- Most Football League hat-tricks – Greg Pearson, Shaun Harrad, Billy Kee, Lucas Akins – 1

=== Transfer records ===
- Highest transfer fee paid: Liam Boyce – £500,000
- Highest transfer fee received: Jackson Irvine – £2,000,000

=== Full international players ===
Burton Albion players who have represented their country while contracted to the club.

- DR Congo – Jacques Maghoma (2010)
- Luxembourg – Aurélien Joachim (2015)
- Australia – Jackson Irvine (2016)
- Jamaica – Lee Williamson (2016)
- Northern Ireland – Jamie Ward (2016)
- Northern Ireland – Tom Flanagan (2017)
- Northern Ireland – Matthew Lund (2017)
- Northern Ireland – Liam Boyce (2018)
- Ireland – Kieran O'Hara (2019)
- Jamaica – Adrian Mariappa (2022)
- New Zealand – Max Crocombe (2023)

=== Club records ===
- Best League position: 20th Football League Championship (level 2) – equivalent to 40th overall (2016–17)
- Best FA Cup performance: 4th round
  - 2010–11 (vs. Burnley)
  - 2025–26 (vs. West Ham United)
- Best League Cup performance: semi-final
  - 2018–19 (vs. Manchester City)
- Best Football League Trophy performance: 3rd round
  - 2022–23 (vs. Accrington Stanley)
  - 2023–24 (vs. Blackpool)
- Best FA Trophy performance: final
  - 1986–87 (after replay) (vs. Kidderminster Harriers)
- Biggest win: 12–1 vs. Coalville Town – Birmingham Senior Cup, 6 September 1954
- Heaviest defeat: 10–0 vs. Barnet – Southern League Premier Division, 7 February 1970
- Biggest Football League win: 6–1 vs. Aldershot Town – Football League Two, 12 December 2009
- Biggest Football League defeat:
  - 1–7 vs. Bristol Rovers – Football League Two, 14 April 2012
  - 1–7 vs. Port Vale – Football League Two, 5 April 2013
  - 0–6 vs. Fulham – Football League Championship, 20 January 2018
- Biggest FA Cup win: 6-0 vs. St Albans City, 1 November 2025
- Biggest FA Cup defeat: 8–0 vs. Bournemouth, 17 November 1956
- Biggest League Cup win: 4–0 vs. Morecambe, 27 August 2019
- Biggest League Cup defeat: 0–9 vs. Manchester City, 9 January 2019
- Biggest League Trophy defeat: 5–1 vs. Chesterfield, 1 September 2009
- Highest scoring Football League game: 5–6 vs. Cheltenham Town – Football League Two, 13 March 2010

^{1}Before re-arrangement of non-League pyramid to include Conference North/South.
Source: Burton Albion | Club | History | Honours | Club Honours

=== Managers ===
As of 4 June 2024

Name	From	To	Record				
Name	From	To	G	W	D	L	Win %
Donald MacPhail	1950	1951					
Billy Wrigglesworth	1951	1952					
Tally Sneddon	1952	April 1953					
Reg Weston	1953	April 1957					
Sammy Crooks	1 June 1957	13 November 1957					
Jackie Stamps	13 November 1957	28 October 1959					
Bill Townsend	1959	October 1962					
Peter Taylor	1962	1965					
Alex Tait	November 1965	1968					
Ian King	1968	1969					
Richie Norman	1970	1973					
Ken Gutteridge	1973	1975					
Harold Bodle	1975	February 1976					
Mick Walker	1976	1977					
Phil Waller	1977	1978					
Ian Storey-Moore	1978	1981					
Neil Warnock	January 1981	February 1986					
Brian Fidler	1986	1988					
Vic Halom	1988	1988					
Bobby Hope	1988	1988					
Chris Wright	1988	1989					
Ken Blair	1989	1990					
Frank Upton (caretaker)	1990	1990					
Steve Powell	1990	1991					
Brian Fidler	1991	1992					
Brian Kenning	1992	1994					
John Barton	1994	September 1998					
Nigel Clough	October 1998	6 January 2009	709	310	101	298	43.72
Roy McFarland	6 January 2009	18 May 2009	22	9	3	10	40.91
Paul Peschisolido	18 May 2009	17 March 2012	102	33	26	43	32.35
Gary Rowett	17 March 2012	27 October 2014	142	63	34	45	44.37
Jimmy Floyd Hasselbaink	13 November 2014	4 December 2015	54	33	11	10	61.11
Nigel Clough	7 December 2015	18 May 2020	228	78	57	93	34.21
Jake Buxton	18 May 2020	29 December 2020	21	2	7	12	9.52
Chris Beardsley (Caretaker)	30 December 2020	2 January 2021	1	0	0	1	0.00
Jimmy Floyd Hasselbaink	2 January 2021	5 September 2022	85	30	18	37	35.29
Dino Maamria	5 September 2022	9 December 2023	46	19	11	16	41.30
Gary Mills (Caretaker)	11 December 2023	11 January 2024	7	2	2	3	28.57
Martin Paterson	11 January 2024	24 May 2024	20	5	3	12	25.00
Mark Robinson	4 June 2024	23 October 2024	14	1	4	9	7.14

== Honours ==
League

- League One (level 3)
  - Runners-up: 2015–16
- League Two (level 4)
  - Champions: 2014–15
- Conference (level 5)
  - Champions: 2008–09
- Northern Premier League (level 6)
  - Champions: 2001–02
- Southern Football League Premier Division
  - Runners-up: 1999–2000, 2000–01

Cup

- FA Trophy
  - Runners-up: 1986–87
- Southern League Cup
  - Winners: 1963–64, 1996–97, 1999–2000
  - Runners-up: 1988–89
- Northern Premier League Challenge Cup
  - Winners: 1982–83
- Staffordshire Senior Cup
  - Winners: 1955–56
- Birmingham Senior Cup
  - Winners: 1953–54, 1996–97
