= 2018–19 Walsall F.C. season =

Walsall
2018–19 season
- Chairman: Jeff Bonser
- Manager: Dean Keates (until 6 April)
- Stadium: Bescot Stadium
- League One: 22nd (relegated)
- FA Cup: Third round
- EFL Cup: Second round
- EFL Trophy: Second round
- Top goalscorer: League: Andy Cook (13); All: Andy Cook (17)
- Highest home attendance: League/All: 7,868 (24 Nov 2018 vs. Sunderland)
- Lowest home attendance: League: 3,287 (12 Feb 2019 vs. AFC Wimbledon); All: 702 (9 October 2018 vs. EFL Trophy)
- Average home league attendance: 4,927
- Biggest win: 3–0 (19 Jan 2019 at Gillingham) (27 Apr 2019 vs. Peterborough United)
- Biggest defeat: 0–4 (15 Dec 2018 at Bradford City)
Home colours	Away colours	Third colours

The 2018–19 season was Walsall's 131st season in their existence and their 12th consecutive season in League One. Along with competing in League One, the club participated in the FA Cup, League Cup and EFL Trophy.

The season covers the period from 1 July 2018 to 30 June 2019.

== Competitions ==
=== Pre-season friendlies ===
The Saddlers pre-season schedule includes matches against Rushall Olympic, Stoke City, Aston Villa, Ajax and Cheltenham Town.

6 July 2018 Friendly	Rushall Olympic	2–1	Walsall	Rushall
19:30 BST	Richards 39'; Devlin 82' (o.g.)	Report	Trialist 72'	Stadium: Dales Lane

14 July 2018 Friendly	Walsall	0–3	Stoke City	Bescot
15:00 BST		Report	Bojan 3'; Afellay 5'; Crouch 60'	Stadium: Bescot Stadium; Attendance: 1,869

17 July 2018 Friendly	Walsall	1–4	Aston Villa	Bescot
19:45 BST	Guthrie 68'	Report	Hourihane 4', 23', 54'; Whelan 39'	Stadium: Bescot Stadium; Attendance: 3,501

19 July 2018 Friendly	Walsall	2–0	Ajax	Bescot
19:45 BST	Cook 27', 70'	Report		Stadium: Bescot Stadium; Attendance: 2,449

28 July 2018 Friendly	Cheltenham Town	1–2	Walsall	Cheltenham
15:00 BST	Graham 89' (pen.)	Report	Devlin 45+1'; Cook 80'	Stadium: Whaddon Road; Attendance: 1,130

=== League One ===
==== League table ====
Pos	Team	Pld	W	D	L	GF	GA	GD	Pts	Promotion, qualification or relegation
20	AFC Wimbledon	46	13	11	22	42	63	−21	50	
21	Plymouth Argyle (R)	46	13	11	22	56	80	−24	50	Relegation to EFL League Two
22	Walsall (R)	46	12	11	23	49	71	−22	47	Relegation to EFL League Two
23	Scunthorpe United (R)	46	12	10	24	53	83	−30	46	Relegation to EFL League Two
24	Bradford City (R)	46	11	8	27	49	77	−28	41	Relegation to EFL League Two

Source: EFL Official Website
Rules for classification: 1) Points; 2) Goal difference; 3) Number of goals scored; 4) Head-to-head results
(R) Relegated

==== Results summary ====
Overall								Home						Away					
Pld	W	D	L	GF	GA	GD	Pts	W	D	L	GF	GA	GD	W	D	L	GF	GA	GD
46	12	11	23	49	71	−22	47	7	5	11	30	37	−7	5	6	12	19	34	−15

Last updated: 4 May 2019.
Source: BBC

==== Results by matchday ====
Matchday	1	2	3	4	5	6	7	8	9	10	11	12	13	14	15	16	17	18	19	20	21	22	23	24	25	26	27	28	29	30	31	32	33	34	35	36	37	38	39	40	41	42	43	44	45	46
Ground	H	A	H	A	A	H	A	H	A	H	H	A	A	A	H	H	H	A	H	A	H	A	A	H	H	A	H	A	A	H	A	H	A	H	A	H	H	A	H	A	H	A	H	A	H	A
Result	W	D	W	W	W	D	D	L	W	L	D	W	L	L	W	L	L	D	D	L	W	L	D	L	D	L	L	W	L	L	L	L	L	W	D	W	L	L	L	L	L	L	D	L	W	D
Position	8	8	4	4	4	5	5	6	5	7	7	5	7	12	9	10	11	11	11	13	10	11	11	14	14	15	16	15	15	17	17	17	18	18	20	16	19	21	21	21	22	23	23	23	22	22

Updated to match(es) played on 4 May 2019. Source: Statto.com
A = Away; H = Home; W = Win; D = Draw; L = Loss

==== Matches ====
On 21 June 2018, the League One fixtures for the forthcoming season were announced.

4 August 2018 1	Walsall	2–1	Plymouth Argyle	Walsall
15:00 BST	Cook 45+1'; Leahy 64'	Report	Edwards 40'	Stadium: Bescot Stadium; Attendance: 5,755; Referee: Andy Haines

11 August 2018 2	Scunthorpe United	1–1	Walsall	Scunthorpe
15:00 BST	Novak 48'	Report	Ismail 64' (pen.)	Stadium: Glanford Park; Attendance: 4,331; Referee: Dean Whitestone

18 August 2018 3	Walsall	2–1	Gillingham	Walsall
15:00 BST	Ferrier 12'; Osbourne 42'	Report	Eaves 90+3'	Stadium: Bescot Stadium; Attendance: 4,361; Referee: Trevor Kettle

21 August 2018 4	AFC Wimbledon	1–3	Walsall	Norbiton
19:45 BST	Appiah 87'	Report	Morris 16'; Nightingale 70' (o.g.); Cook 79'	Stadium: Kingsmeadow; Attendance: 3,887; Referee: Tom Nield

25 August 2018 5	Rochdale	1–2	Walsall	Rochdale
15:00 BST	Camps 79'	Report	Ginnelly 32'; Ismail 77' (yellow card) 70' (yellow-red card) 86'	Stadium: Spotland Stadium; Attendance: 3,080; Referee: Graham Salisbury

1 September 2018 6	Walsall	0–0	Blackpool	Walsall
15:00 BST		Report		Stadium: Bescot Stadium; Attendance: 4,762; Referee: Lee Swabey

8 September 2018 7	Barnsley	1–1	Walsall	Barnsley
15:00 BST	Adeboyejo 55'	Report	Cook 88'	Stadium: Oakwell; Attendance: 11,468; Referee: Craig Hicks

15 September 2018 8	Walsall	1–4	Doncaster Rovers	Walsall
15:00 BST	Ferrier 17'	Report	Marquis 33' (pen.); Wilks 58'; Coppinger 66'; Blair 90+2'	Stadium: Bescot Stadium; Attendance: 4,546; Referee: Antony Coggins

22 September 2018 9	Oxford United	1–2	Walsall	Oxford
15:00 BST	Henry 87'	Report	Ferrier 24'; Ismail 58'	Stadium: Kassam Stadium; Attendance: 6,080; Referee: Alan Young

29 September 2018 10	Walsall	0–1	Accrington Stanley	Walsall
15:00 BST		Report	Kee 7' (pen.)	Stadium: Bescot Stadium; Attendance: 4,257; Referee: Charles Breakspear

2 October 2018 11	Walsall	0–0	Shrewsbury Town	Walsall
19:45 BST		Report		Stadium: Bescot Stadium; Attendance: 4,555; Referee: Graham Salisbury

6 October 2018 12	Bristol Rovers	0–1	Walsall	Horfield
15:00 BST		Report	Leahy (yellow card) 8'; Ginnelly (yellow card) 43'; Morris 90+4'	Stadium: Memorial Stadium; Attendance: 7,768; Referee: Lee Swabey

20 October 2018 13	Luton Town	2–0	Walsall	Luton
15:00 BST	Rea 20'; Grant 55'	Report		Stadium: Kenilworth Road; Attendance: 8,953; Referee: Andy Woolmer

23 October 2018 14	Southend United	3–0	Walsall	Southend-on-Sea
19:45 BST	Bunn 23', 82'; Dieng 76'	Report		Stadium: Roots Hall; Referee: Alan Young

27 October 2018 15	Walsall	3–2	Wycombe Wanderers	Walsall
15:00 BST	Cook 36'; Osbourne 52'; Wilson (yellow card) 68'; Gape 84' (o.g.)	Report	Leahy 80' (o.g.); Samuel 90+3'	Stadium: Bescot Stadium; Attendance: 4,265; Referee: Neil Hair

3 November 2018 16	Walsall	1–3	Burton Albion	Walsall
15:00 GMT	Cook 77'	Report	Allen 13'; Cole 25'; Fraser 47'	Stadium: Bescot Stadium; Attendance: 5,297; Referee: Kevin Johnson

6 November 2018 17	Walsall	0–2	Charlton Athletic	Walsall
15:00 GMT		Report	Taylor 6' (pen.); Bielik 51'	Stadium: Bescot Stadium; Attendance: 3,719; Referee: Tom Nield

17 November 2018 18	Fleetwood Town	0–0	Walsall	Fleetwood
12:00 GMT		Report	Martin (yellow card) 73'	Stadium: Highbury Stadium; Attendance: 3,090; Referee: Ross Joyce

24 November 2018 19	Walsall	2–2	Sunderland	Walsall
15:00 GMT	Gordon 46'; Ginnelly 52'	Report	Power (red card) 23'; McGeady 62'; Gooch 89'	Stadium: Bescot Stadium; Attendance: 7,868; Referee: Craig Hicks

27 November 2018 20	Portsmouth	2–0	Walsall	Portsmouth
19:45 GMT	Hawkins 25'; Curtis 49'	Report		Stadium: Fratton Park; Attendance: 16,794; Referee: Alan Young

8 December 2018 21	Walsall	2–1	Coventry City	Walsall
15:00 GMT	Osbourne (yellow card) 45+2'; Devlin (yellow card) 45+2'; Leahy	Report	Thomas 18'	Stadium: Bescot Stadium; Attendance: 5,926; Referee: David Coote

15 December 2018 22	Bradford City	4–0	Walsall	Bradford
15:00 GMT	Caddis 34'; Ball 52', 61'; Doyle 83'	Report		Stadium: Valley Parade; Attendance: 15,314; Referee: Ben Toner

22 December 2018 23	Peterborough United	1–1	Walsall	Peterborough
15:00 GMT	Toney 47'; Maddison (yellow card) 73'; O'Malley (yellow card) 89'	Report	Cook (yellow card) 36'; Osbourne 45+1'; Leahy (penalty missed) 90'	Stadium: London Road Stadium; Attendance: 7,243; Referee: Paul Marsden

26 December 2018 24	Walsall	1–3	Bristol Rovers	Walsall
15:00 GMT	Gordon 45'; Leahy (yellow card) 72'	Report	Lockyer 7'; Rodman 10'; Holmes-Dennis (yellow card) 40' (goal) 52'; Reilly (yellow card) 43'	Stadium: Bescot Stadium; Attendance: 5,069; Referee: Robert Lewis

29 December 2018 25	Walsall	2–2	Luton Town	Walsall
15:00 GMT	Ferrier 28' (pen.); Gordon (yellow card) 55'; Cook 67'; Guthrie (yellow card) 90+3'	Report	McCormack (yellow card) 60'; Hylton (yellow card) 60'; Collins 72' (yellow card) 90+4'; LuaLua 90+4'	Stadium: Bescot Stadium; Attendance: 5,739; Referee: Ollie Yates

1 January 2019 26	Charlton Athletic	2–1	Walsall	Charlton
15:00 GMT	Ahearne-Grant 6'; Taylor 9' (pen.)	Report	Fitzwater (yellow card) 8'; Edwards (yellow card) 44'; Cook 47'; Leahy (yellow card) 66'; Gordon (yellow card) 69'	Stadium: The Valley; Attendance: 10,421; Referee: Ross Joyce

12 January 2019 27	Walsall	1–2	Scunthorpe United	Walsall
15:00 GMT	Gordon (yellow card) 41'; Devlin 53'; Leahy (yellow card) 75'	Report	Ojo 12'; Perch (yellow card) 43'; Novak 68'	Stadium: Bescot Stadium; Attendance: 3,984; Referee: Matt Donohue

19 January 2019 28	Gillingham	0–3	Walsall	Gillingham
		Report	Cook 9', 19', 47'	Stadium: Priestfield Stadium; Attendance: 3,975; Referee: Darren Drysdale

22 January 2019 29	Plymouth Argyle	2–1	Walsall	Plymouth
19:45 GMT	Edwards 54'; Canavan 65'; Songo'o (yellow card) 90'	Report	Osbourne (yellow card) 26'; Gordon (yellow card) 57'; Cook 82'	Stadium: Home Park; Attendance: 8,446; Referee: John Busby

2 February 2019 30	Walsall	1–2	Rochdale	Walsall
15:00 GMT	Edwards 36'; Devlin (yellow card) 43'; Cook (yellow card) 83'	Report	Ebanks-Landell 4'; Hamilton 60' (yellow card) 78'; Henderson (yellow card) 90+6'	Stadium: Bescot Stadium; Attendance: 4,021; Referee: Scott Oldham

9 February 2019 31	Blackpool	2–0	Walsall	Blackpool
15:00 GMT	Long 14'; Pritchard 88'; Bola (yellow card) 90'	Report	Jarvis (penalty missed) 67'; Cook (yellow card) 73'	Stadium: Bloomfield Road; Attendance: 3,252; Referee: Thomas Bramall

12 February 2019 32	Walsall	0–1	AFC Wimbledon	Walsall
19:45 GMT	Cook (yellow card) 81'; Scarr (yellow card) 90+3'	Report	Hartigan (yellow card) 3'; Oshilaja (yellow card) 15'; Seddon 48' (yellow card) 49'	Stadium: Bescot Stadium; Attendance: 3,287; Referee: Chris Sarginson

16 February 2019 33	Coventry City	3–0	Walsall	Coventry
15:00 GMT	Bakayoko 29'; Enobakhare (yellow card) 36' (goal) 73' (pen.); Hiwula 36'	Report		Stadium: Ricoh Arena; Attendance: 10,646; Referee: Anthony Backhouse

23 February 2019 34	Walsall	3–2	Bradford City	Walsall
15:00 GMT	Cook (red card) 6'; Devlin (yellow card) 24'; Gordon 42', 62'; Edwards 47'; Jarvis (yellow card) 53'	Report	Doyle 12'; O'Brien (yellow card) 34'; O'Connor 53'; Butterfield (yellow card) 74'	Stadium: Bescot Stadium; Attendance: 5,503; Referee: Brett Huxtable

2 March 2019 35	Burton Albion	0–0	Walsall	Burton upon Trent
15:00 GMT	Harness (yellow card) 45'	Report	Gordon (yellow card) 41'	Stadium: Pirelli Stadium; Attendance: 3,924; Referee: Paul Marsden

9 March 2019 36	Walsall	2–0	Fleetwood Town	Walsall
15:00 GMT	Ferrier 54'; Scarr 67'; Devlin (yellow card) 74'	Report		Stadium: Bescot Stadium; Attendance: 4,986; Referee: Eddie Ilderton

12 March 2019 37	Walsall	2–3	Portsmouth	Walsall
19:45 GMT	Kinsella (yellow card) 37'; Gordon (yellow card) 72'; Guthrie 75', 90+4'; Ferrier (yellow card) 76'	Report	Pitman 13' (pen.); Clarke (yellow card) 16'; Bogle 25'; Solomon-Otabor 68'	Stadium: Bescot Stadium; Attendance: 4,097; Referee: Trevor Kettle

16 March 2019 38	Sunderland	2–1	Walsall	Sunderland
15:00 GMT	Cattermole 33' (yellow card) 49'; Leadbitter (yellow card) 35'; Grigg 71'; Gooch (yellow card) 90+5'	Report	Gordon 4' (yellow card) 56'; Guthrie (yellow card) 38'	Stadium: Stadium of Light; Attendance: 34,647; Referee: Alan Young

23 March 2019 39	Walsall	0–1	Barnsley	Walsall
12:00 GMT	Dobson (yellow card) 82'	Report	Lindsay (yellow card) 41'; Green (yellow card) 89'; Brown 90+2' (yellow card) 90+3'	Stadium: Bescot Stadium; Attendance: 4,969; Referee: Ben Toner

30 March 2019 40	Doncaster Rovers	3–1	Walsall	Doncaster
15:00 GMT	Marquis 3' (pen.); Wilks 4'; Andrew 39'	Report	Gordon 14'; Leahy (yellow card) 90+4'	Stadium: Keepmoat Stadium; Attendance: 7,630; Referee: Graham Salisbury

6 April 2019 41	Walsall	1–3	Oxford United	Walsall
15:00 BST	Gordon (yellow card) 17'; Cook 26' (yellow card) 90+4'; Dobson (yellow card) 39'	Report	Kashi (yellow card) 16' (yellow-red card) 90+7'; Dickie 21'; Browne (red card) 45+8'; Garbutt 63'; Sinclair 90+5' (yellow card) 90+6'; Graham (yellow card) 90+7'	Stadium: Bescot Stadium; Attendance: 6,339; Referee: David Webb

13 April 2019 42	Accrington Stanley	2–1	Walsall	Accrington
15:00 BST	Sykes 11', 69'; Finley (yellow card) 37'	Report	Devlin 33'; Kinsella (yellow card) 45+1'; Scarr (yellow card) 80'; Gordon (yellow card) 81' (yellow-red card) 84'; Cook (yellow card) 84'; Leahy (yellow card) 88'	Stadium: Crown Ground; Attendance: 2,662; Referee: Eddie Ilderton

19 April 2019 43	Walsall	1–1	Southend United	Walsall
15:00 BST	Johnson (yellow card) 76'; Oteh (yellow card) 90+4' (goal) 90+4' (pen.)	Report	Cox 43'; Hart (yellow card) 53'; White (yellow card) 81'; Oxley (yellow card) 90+4'; Turner (yellow card) 90+4'	Stadium: Bescot Stadium; Attendance: 4,624; Referee: Ross Joyce

22 April 2019 44	Wycombe Wanderers	1–0	Walsall	High Wycombe
15:00 BST	McCarthy 54'; Bloomfield (yellow card) 70'	Report	Johnson (yellow card) 13'; Laird (yellow card) 90+3'	Stadium: Adams Park; Attendance: 5,595; Referee: Charles Breakspear

27 April 2019 45	Walsall	3–0	Peterborough United	Walsall
15:00 BST	Cook 45+2'; Dobson (yellow card) 48'; Lafferty 57' (o.g.); Gordon 74'	Report	Woodyard (yellow card) 61'	Stadium: Bescot Stadium; Attendance: 5,400; Referee: Martin Coy

4 May 2019 46	Shrewsbury Town	0–0	Walsall	Shrewsbury
17:30 BST	Bolton (yellow card) 43'	Report	Dobson (yellow card) 46'	Stadium: New Meadow; Attendance: 9,635; Referee: Sebastian Stockbridge

=== FA Cup ===
The first round draw was made live on BBC by Dennis Wise and Dion Dublin on 22 October. The draw for the second round was made live on BBC and BT by Mark Schwarzer and Glenn Murray on 12 November. The third round draw was made live on BBC by Ruud Gullit and Paul Ince from Stamford Bridge on 3 December 2018.

10 November 2018 First round	Walsall	3–2	Coventry City	Walsall
15:00 GMT	Cook 12'; Ginnelly 28'; Devlin 77'	Report	Clarke-Harris 33'; Thomas 56'	Stadium: Bescot Stadium; Attendance: 4,760; Referee: Thomas Bramall

1 December 2018 Second round	Walsall	1–1	Sunderland	Walsall
15:00 GMT	Cook 53'	Report	McGeady 37'	Stadium: Bescot Stadium; Attendance: 3,140; Referee: Carl Boyeson

11 December 2018 Second round replay	Sunderland	0–1	Walsall	Sunderland
19:45 GMT		Report	Kinsella 52'	Stadium: Stadium of Light; Attendance: 8,212

5 January 2019 Third round	Bolton Wanderers	5–2	Walsall	Bolton
15:00 GMT	Magennis (yellow card) 40' (goal) 61', 80', 87'; Donaldson (yellow card) 55' (goal) 58'; Guthrie 63' (o.g.)	Report	Cook 19'; Beevers 68' (o.g.); Ferrier (yellow card) 84'	Stadium: University of Bolton Stadium; Attendance: 5,506; Referee: Darren England

=== EFL Cup ===
On 15 June 2018, the draw for the first round was made in Vietnam. The second round draw was made from the Stadium of Light on 16 August.

14 August 2018 First round	Tranmere Rovers	1–3	Walsall	Birkenhead
19:45 BST	Cole 80'	Report	Ferrier 29'; Ginnelly 64'; Ismail 68'	Stadium: Prenton Park; Attendance: 3,817; Referee: Michael Salisbury

28 August 2018 Second round	Walsall	3–3 (1–3 p)	Macclesfield Town	Walsall
19:45 BST	Morris 33'; Cook 63'; Gordon 64'	Report	Grimes 10'; Smith 25'; Marsh 90+1'	Stadium: Bescot Stadium; Attendance: 2,352; Referee: Darren Drysdale
	Penalties
	Cook (penalty missed); Leahy (penalty missed); Kouhyar (penalty scored); Morris (penalty missed)		Whitaker (penalty scored); Smith (penalty scored); Fitzpatrick (penalty scored)

=== EFL Trophy ===
On 13 July 2018, the initial group stage draw bar the U21 invited clubs was announced. The draw for the second round was made live on Talksport by Leon Britton and Steve Claridge on 16 November.

Pos	Lge	Team	Pld	W	PW	PL	L	GF	GA	GD	Pts	Qualification
1	L2	Port Vale	3	3	0	0	0	5	1	+4	9	Round 2
2	L1	Walsall	3	2	0	0	1	6	4	+2	6	Round 2
3	ACA	Middlesbrough U21	3	1	0	0	2	2	5	−3	3	
4	L1	Burton Albion	3	0	0	0	3	1	4	−3	0	

Source: EFL.com

4 September 2018 Group stages	Burton Albion	1–2	Walsall	Burton upon Trent
19:45 BST	Harness 89'	Report	Morris 10'; Gordon 28'	Stadium: Pirelli Stadium; Attendance: 724; Referee: Robert Lewis

9 October 2018 Group stages	Walsall	3–1	Middlesbrough U21	Walsall
19:00 BST	Fitzwater 26'; Kouhyar 31'; Cook 89'	Report	Ward 67'	Stadium: Bescot Stadium; Attendance: 702

13 November 2018 Group stages	Walsall	1–2	Port Vale	Walsall
19:00 GMT	Johnson 45+1' (yellow card) 26' (yellow-red card) 50'	Report	Quigley 4'; Pugh 65'	Stadium: Bescot Stadium; Attendance: 878

5 December 2018 Second round	Shrewsbury Town	2–1	Walsall	Shrewsbury
19:30 GMT	Gilliead 24'; Loft 72'	Report	Morris 77'	Stadium: New Meadow; Attendance: 1,857

== Transfers ==
=== Transfers in ===
Date from	Position	Nationality	Name	From	Fee	Ref.
1 July 2018	CF	(England)	Andy Cook	Tranmere Rovers	Free transfer	
1 July 2018	GK	(England)	Chris Dunn	(Wales) Wrexham	Free transfer	
1 July 2018	LW	(England)	Josh Ginnelly	Burnley	Free transfer	
1 July 2018	RM	(England)	Zeli Ismail	Bury	Free transfer	
1 July 2018	GK	(England)	Joe Slinn	Port Vale	Free transfer	
3 August 2018	CF	(England)	Morgan Ferrier	Boreham Wood	Undisclosed	
9 August 2018	CF	(England)	Josh Gordon	Leicester City	Undisclosed	
9 August 2018	DM	(England)	Isaiah Osbourne	Forest Green Rovers	Free transfer	
19 October 2018	CB	(Scotland)	Russell Martin	Norwich City	Free transfer	
31 October 2018	RB	(England)	Ben Purkiss	Swindon Town	Free transfer	
2 January 2019	MF	(Belgium)	Omar Mussa	(Belgium) Mechelen	Compensation	
18 January 2019	RB	(England)	Cameron Norman	Oxford United	Undisclosed	
21 January 2019	CB	(England)	Dan Scarr	Birmingham City	Undisclosed	

=== Transfers out ===
Date from	Position	Nationality	Name	To	Fee	Ref.
1 July 2018	DM	(Bermuda)	Milan Butterfield	Free agent	Released	
1 July 2018	CM	(Belgium)	Florent Cuvelier	Morecambe	Released	
1 July 2018	CM	(England)	Reece Flanagan	Free agent	Released	
1 July 2018	GK	(England)	Mark Gillespie	(Scotland) Motherwell	Free transfer	
1 July 2018	CF	(Canada)	Simeon Jackson	(Scotland) St Mirren	Released	
1 July 2018	AM	(England)	Erhun Oztumer	Bolton Wanderers	Free transfer	
1 July 2018	LB	(England)	Joshveer Shergill	Leeds United	Undisclosed	
1 July 2018	LM	(England)	Will Shorrock	Free agent	Released	
7 August 2018	CF	(Sierra Leone)	Amadou Bakayoko	Coventry City	Undisclosed	
15 August 2018	CF	(England)	Joseph Cairns	(Sweden) Gottne	Free transfer	
1 January 2019	LW	(England)	Josh Ginnelly	Preston North End	Undisclosed	
12 January 2019	CB	(Scotland)	Russell Martin	Milton Keynes Dons	Mutual consent	

=== Loans in ===
Start date	Position	Nationality	Name	From	End date	Ref.
3 August 2018	CB	(England)	Jack Fitzwater	West Bromwich Albion	3 January 2019	
3 August 2018	RB	(England)	Kane Wilson	West Bromwich Albion	3 January 2019	
31 August 2018	CB	(England)	Connor Johnson	Wolverhampton Wanderers	31 May 2019	
31 August 2018	CM	(Republic of Ireland)	Connor Ronan	Wolverhampton Wanderers	1 January 2019	
1 January 2019	LW	(England)	Matt Jarvis	Norwich City	31 May 2019	
17 January 2019	LB	(England)	Scott Laird	Forest Green Rovers	31 May 2019	
30 January 2019	CF	(England)	Aramide Oteh	Queens Park Rangers	31 May 2019	
31 January 2019	RW	(England)	Corey Blackett-Taylor	Aston Villa	31 May 2019	
31 January 2019	CB	(England)	Jack Fitzwater	West Bromwich Albion	31 May 2019	

=== Loans out ===
Start date	Position	Nationality	Name	To	End date	Ref.
1 August 2018	GK	(England)	Joe Slinn	Rushall Olympic	31 May 2019	
16 August 2018	FW	(England)	Cameron Peters	Bromsgrove Sporting	November 2018	
31 August 2018	FW	(England)	Mitchel Candlin	Blackburn Rovers	14 January 2019	
31 August 2018	DF	(England)	Dan Vann	Matlock Town	September 2018	
12 September 2018	MF	(England)	Jordan Sangha	Ashton United	January 2019	
15 September 2018	LB	(Republic of Ireland)	Callum Cockerill-Mollett	AFC Telford United	October 2019	
29 September 2018	MF	(England)	Tobias Hayles-Docherty	Halesowen Town	3 November 2018	
2 November 2018	LB	(Republic of Ireland)	Callum Cockerill-Mollett	Chasetown	February 2019	
2 November 2018	DF	(England)	Dan Vann	Chasetown	February 2019	
1 January 2019	FW	(England)	Dylan Parker	Rushall Olympic	13 March 2019	
3 January 2019	FW	(England)	Cameron Peters	Bromsgrove Sporting	31 May 2019	
28 January 2019	LW	(England)	Kieron Morris	Tranmere Rovers	31 May 2019	
13 February 2019	MF	(England)	Jordan Sangha	Hednesford Town	31 May 2019	
15 February 2019	WG	(England)	Tobias Hayles-Docherty	Walsall Wood	17 April 2019	
14 March 2019	FW	(England)	Dylan Parker	Leamington	31 May 2019	
