= 2017–18 Walsall F.C. season =

Walsall
2017–18 season
- Chairman: Jeff Bonser
- Manager: Jon Whitney (until 12 March 2018); Ian Sharps (caretaker, from 12 March 2018 until 16 March 2018); Dean Keates (from 16 March 2018)
- Stadium: Bescot Stadium
- League One: 19th
- FA Cup: First round
- EFL Cup: First round
- EFL Trophy: Second round
- Top goalscorer: League: Erhun Oztumer (15); All: Erhun Oztumer (17)
Home colours	Away colours	Third colours

The 2017–18 season was Walsall's 130th season in their existence and their eleventh consecutive season in League One. Along with competing in League One, the club participated in the FA Cup, League Cup and EFL Trophy.

The season covers the period from 1 July 2017 to 30 June 2018.

== Competitions ==
=== Friendlies ===
Pre-season match details
Date	Opponents	Venue	Result	Score F–A	Scorers	Attendance	Ref
8 July 2017	Kidderminster Harriers XI	H	W	2–0	Peters, Bakayoko	0	
15 July 2017	Solihull Moors	A	L	2–3	Kouhyar, Edwards	647	
18 July 2017	Aston Villa	H	D	0–0		7,022	
19 July 2017	Stafford Rangers	A	L	2–3	Candlin (2)	323	
22 July 2017	Chester	A	W	2–1	Leahy, Candlin	888	
26 July 2017	West Bromwich Albion	H	L	1–2	Bakayoko		
27 July 2017	Chasetown	A	W	5–1	Hayles-Docherty, Fisher, Candlin (3)		
29 July 2017	Lincoln City	A	L	1–2	Jackson	2,376	
1 August 2017	Rushall Olympic	A	D	2–2	Sangha, Peters		

=== League One ===
League One match details
Date	League position	Opponents	Venue	Result	Score F–A	Scorers	Attendance	Ref
5 August 2017	21st	Bury	A	L	0–1		4,240	
12 August 2017	12th	Oldham Athletic	H	W	2–1	Edwards, Oztumer	4,419	
19 August 2017	12th	Portsmouth	A	D	1–1	Leahy	17,198	
26 August 2017	13th	Bradford City	H	D	3–3	Leahy, T. Roberts, Bakayoko	4,817	
2 September 2017	10th	Plymouth Argyle	H	W	2–1	Agyei, Oztumer	5,495	
9 September 2017	13th	Bristol Rovers	A	L	1–2	Wilson	8,544	
12 September 2017	14th	Rotherham United	A	L	1–5	Bakayoko	7,330	
16 September 2017	14th	Peterborough United	H	D	1–1	Oztumer	4,453	
23 September 2017	13th	Oxford United	A	W	2–1	Edwards, T. Roberts	6,895	
26 September 2017	13th	Charlton Athletic	H	D	2–2	T. Roberts, Agyei	3,712	
30 September 2017	16th	Wigan Athletic	A	L	0–2		8,107	
7 October 2017	16th	Shrewsbury Town	H	D	1–1	Agyei	5,971	
14 October 2017	16th	Blackpool	H	D	1–1	Oztumer	4,503	
17 October 2017	16th	Milton Keynes Dons	A	D	1–1	T. Roberts (pen)	7,258	
21 October 2017	14th	Doncaster Rovers	A	W	3–0	Oztumer (2), Morris	7,391	
28 October 2017	15th	Southend United	H	L	0–1		4,145	
18 November 2017	18th	Gillingham	H	L	0–1		4,917	
21 November 2017	15th	Fleetwood Town	H	W	4–2	Oztumer, Ismail, T. Roberts, Agyei	3,225	
25 November 2017	13th	AFC Wimbledon	A	W	2–1	Oztumer, Bakayoko	4,130	
9 December 2017	11th	Scunthorpe United	H	W	1–0	Morris	3,865	
16 December 2017	11th	Northampton Town	A	L	1–2	Oztumer	5,055	
23 December 2017	11th	Rochdale	A	D	1–1	Kouhyar	2,702	
26 December 2017	12th	Bristol Rovers	H	D	0–0		5,759	
30 December 2017	14th	Rotherham United	H	L	1–2	Edwards	4,685	
1 January 2018	18th	Plymouth Argyle	A	L	0–1		10,432	
13 January 2018	15th	Oxford United	H	W	2–1	Oztumer, Bakayoko	4,569	
20 January 2018	16th	Charlton Athletic	A	L	1–3	Oztumer	10,140	
30 January 2018	18th	Blackburn Rovers	A	L	1–3	Edwards	11,241	
3 February 2018	16th	Milton Keynes Dons	H	W	1–0	Ngoy	4,009	
10 February 2018	16th	Blackpool	A	D	2–2	Edwards, Guthrie	3,404	
13 February 2018	15th	Doncaster Rovers	H	W	4–2	Edwards (2), Morris, Bakayoko	3,514	
17 February 2018	16th	Gillingham	A	D	0–0		4,682	
24 February 2018	17th	Blackburn Rovers	H	L	1–2	Fitzwater	6,893	
27 February 2018	17th	Peterborough United	A	L	1–2	Ngoy	2,531	
3 March 2018	13th	Southend United	A	W	3–0	Oztumer (3)	6,413	
6 March 2018	13th	Rochdale	H	L	0–3		3,505	
10 March 2018	14th	Shrewsbury Town	A	L	0–2		7,633	
21 March 2018	17th	Wigan Athletic	H	L	0–3		4,477	
31 March 2018	18th	Portsmouth	H	L	0–1		5,159	
7 April 2018	18th	Bury	H	W	1–0	Thompson (og)	3,807	
11 April 2018	18th	Oldham Athletic	A	D	1–1	Fitzwater	3,424	
14 April 2018	19th	AFC Wimbledon	H	L	2–3	Fitzwater, Ngoy	4,663	
21 April 2018	19th	Scunthorpe United	A	L	0–1		4,083	
28 April 2018	18th	Northampton Town	H	W	1–0	Dobson	8,919	
1 May 2018	18th	Bradford City	A	D	1–1	Oztumer	18,976	
5 May 2018	19th	Fleetwood Town	A	L	0–2		3,644	

==== League table ====
Pos	Team	Pld	W	D	L	GF	GA	GD	Pts	Promotion, qualification or relegation
17	Gillingham	46	13	17	16	50	55	−5	56	
18	AFC Wimbledon	46	13	14	19	47	58	−11	53	
19	Walsall	46	13	13	20	53	66	−13	52	
20	Rochdale	46	11	18	17	49	57	−8	51	
21	Oldham Athletic (R)	46	11	17	18	58	75	−17	50	Relegation to EFL League Two

Source: BBC Sport
Rules for classification: 1) Points; 2) Goal difference; 3) Number of goals scored
(R) Relegated

=== FA Cup ===
FA Cup match details
Round	Date	Opponents	Venue	Result	Score F–A	Scorers	Attendance	Ref
First round	4 November 2017	Newport County	A	L	1–2	Bakayoko	2,701	

=== EFL Cup ===
EFL Cup match details
Round	Date	Opponents	Venue	Result	Score F–A	Scorers	Attendance	Ref
First round	9 August 2017	Sheffield United	A	L	2–3	Bakayoko, Oztumer (pen)	5,210	

=== EFL Trophy ===
Pos	Lge	Team	Pld	W	PW	PL	L	GF	GA	GD	Pts	Qualification
1	L1	Walsall (Q)	3	2	0	1	0	6	3	+3	7	Round 2
2	L1	Shrewsbury Town (Q)	3	2	0	0	1	6	3	+3	6	Round 2
3	L2	Coventry City (E)	3	1	1	0	1	6	6	0	5	
4	ACA	West Bromwich Albion U21 (E)	3	0	0	0	3	2	8	−6	0	

Updated to match(es) played on 3 October 2017. Source: EFL.com
(E) Eliminated; (Q) Qualified to the phase indicated

EFL Trophy match details
Round	Date	Opponents	Venue	Result	Score F–A	Scorers	Attendance	Ref
Northern Group E	19 September 2017	West Bromwich Albion U21s	H	W	3–1	Flanagan, Ismail, Leahy	1,055	
Northern Group E	3 October 2017	Coventry City	H	D	2–2^{[A]}	Ismail, Agyei	1,517	
Northern Group E	7 November 2017	Shrewsbury Town	A	W	1–0	Bakayoko	1,701	
Second round	2 December 2017	Bury	H	L	1–2	Oztumer	1,065	

== Transfers ==
=== In ===
Date	Name	From	Fee	Ref
1 July 2017	Nicky Devlin	Ayr United	Free	
1 July 2017	Mark Gillespie	Carlisle United	Free	
1 July 2017	Jon Guthrie	Crewe Alexandra	Free	
1 July 2017	Luke Leahy	Falkirk	Free (released)	
3 January 2018	George Dobson	Sparta Rotterdam	Undisclosed	

=== Out ===
Date	Name	To	Fee	Ref
13 June 2017	Andreas Makris	APOEL Nicosia	Undisclosed	
30 June 2017	Bradley Caswell	Stafford Rangers	Released	
30 June 2017	Lezion Cela	Smethwick	Released	
30 June 2017	Craig MacGillivray	Shrewsbury Town	Released	
30 June 2017	Ashley Maddocks	Unattached	Released	
30 June 2017	Franck Moussa	Gillingham	Released	
30 June 2017	Isaiah Osbourne	Forest Green Rovers	Released	
30 June 2017	Theo Vassell	Gateshead	Released	
30 June 2017	Neil Etheridge	Cardiff City	Rejected new contract	
30 June 2017	Matt Preston	Swindon Town	Rejected new contract	
31 August 2017	James O'Connor	Kidderminster Harriers	Contract terminated by mutual consent	
29 December 2017	Rory Oliver	Unattached	Released	
29 December 2017	Sam Tonks	Unattached	Released	

=== Loan in ===
Date	Name	From	End date	Ref
17 July 2017	James Wilson	Sheffield United	11 January 2018	
11 August 2017	Shaun Donnellan	West Bromwich Albion	1 January 2018	
25 August 2017	Tyler Roberts	West Bromwich Albion	26 January 2018	
31 August 2017	Dan Agyei	Burnley	4 January 2018	
31 August 2017	Zeli Ismail	Bury	4 January 2018	
29 January 2018	Justin Shaibu	Brentford	6 May 2018	
31 January 2018	Krystian Bielik	Arsenal	6 May 2018	
31 January 2018	Jack Fitzwater	West Bromwich Albion	6 May 2018	
31 January 2018	Julien Ngoy	Stoke City	6 May 2018	

=== Loan out ===
Date	Name	To	End date	Ref
8 August 2017	Milan Butterfield	Leamington	5 September 2017	
20 October 2017	Milan Butterfield	Rushall Olympic	28 April 2018	
20 October 2017	Jordan Sangha	Rushall Olympic	22 March 2018	
31 January 2018	Simeon Jackson	Grimsby Town	6 May 2018	
22 March 2018	Jordan Sangha	Leamington	28 April 2018	

== Squad statistics ==
Numbers in parentheses denote appearances as substitute.
Players with squad numbers struck through and marked † left the club during the playing season.
Players with names in italics and marked * were on loan from another club for the whole of their season with Walsall.
Players listed with no appearances have been in the matchday squad but only as unused substitutes.
Key to positions: GK – Goalkeeper; DF – Defender; MF – Midfielder; FW – Forward

No.	Pos.	Nat.	Name	Apps	Goals	Apps	Goals	Apps	Goals	Apps	Goals	Apps	Goals	Yellow card	Red card
No.	Pos.	Nat.	Name	League		FA Cup		EFL Cup		EFL Trophy		Total		Discipline	
1	GK	ENG	Mark Gillespie	23	0	1	0	1	0	0	0	25	0	1	0
2	MF	ENG	Joe Edwards	29 (1)	7	1	0	1	0	1 (1)	0	32 (2)	7	5	0
3	DF	ENG	Luke Leahy	46	2	1	0	1	0	4	1	52	3	4	0
4	MF	ENG	George Dobson	19 (2)	1	0	0	0	0	0	0	19 (2)	1	3	0
5	DF	ENG	Jon Guthrie	46	1	1	0	1	0	4	0	52	1	4	0
6	DF	SCO	Nicky Devlin	30 (3)	0	0	0	1	0	1 (1)	0	32 (4)	0	3	0
7	MF	ENG	Adam Chambers	43	0	1	0	1	0	2	0	47	0	8	0
8	MF	BEL	Florent Cuvelier	10 (13)	0	0	0	0	0	0	0	10 (13)	0	0	0
9	FW	CAN	Simeon Jackson	1 (7)	0	0	0	0 (1)	0	0 (1)	0	1 (9)	0	0	0
10	MF	ENG	Erhun Oztumer	41 (4)	15	1	0	1	1	1 (2)	1	44 (6)	17	3	0
11	MF	ENG	Kieron Morris	35 (7)	3	1	0	1	0	4	0	41 (7)	3	1	0
13	GK	ENG	Liam Roberts	23 (1)	0	0	0	0	0	4	0	27 (1)	0	0	0
~~14~~ †	DF	WAL	James Wilson *	19	1	0	0	0	0	1	0	20	1	5	0
15	MF	IRL	Liam Kinsella	17 (2)	0	1	0	1	0	3	0	22 (2)	0	2	0
16	FW	DEN	Justin Shaibu *	3 (11)	0	0	0	0	0	0	0	3 (11)	0	0	0
17	MF	ENG	Reece Flanagan	3 (6)	0	0	0	0	0	3 (1)	1	6 (7)	1	1	0
~~18~~ †	FW	WAL	Tyler Roberts *	11 (6)	5	1	0	0	0	1	0	13 (6)	5	1	0
18	FW	BEL	Julien Ngoy *	9 (4)	3	0	0	0	0	0	0	9 (4)	3	1	0
~~19~~ †	MF	ENG	Zeli Ismail *	12 (4)	1	1	0	0	0	3	2	16 (4)	3	2	0
20	FW	SLE	Amadou Bakayoko	33 (8)	5	0 (1)	1	1	1	3 (1)	1	37 (10)	8	8	1
22	MF	ENG	Jordan Sangha	0	0	0	0	0	0	0 (1)	0	0 (1)	0	0	0
~~23~~ †	DF	IRL	Shaun Donnellan *	7 (3)	0	1	0	0	0	0	0	8 (3)	0	1	0
23	DF	ENG	Jack Fitzwater *	16	3	0	0	0	0	0	0	16	3	2	0
24	DF	ENG	Kory Roberts	17 (3)	0	0	0	1	0	3	0	21 (3)	0	1	0
25	MF	AFG	Maziar Kouhyar	5 (10)	1	0 (1)	0	0 (1)	0	4	0	9 (12)	1	0	0
~~26~~ †	MF	ENG	Rory Oliver	0	0	0	0	0	0	0	0	0	0	0	0
27	MF	ENG	Daniel O'Sullivan	0	0	0	0	0	0	0	0	0	0	0	0
28	DF	IRL	Callum Cockerill-Mollett	1	0	0	0	0	0	0	0	1	0	0	0
29	MF	ENG	Will Shorrock	0 (1)	0	0	0	0	0	0 (1)	0	0 (2)	0	0	0
~~32~~ †	FW	ENG	Dan Agyei *	7 (11)	4	0	0	0	0	2 (1)	1	9 (12)	5	2	0
33	MF	ENG	Stefan Mason	0	0	0	0	0	0	0	0	0	0	0	0
34	DF	ENG	Dan Vann	0	0	0	0	0	0	0	0	0	0	0	0
35	MF	ENG	Tobias Hayles-Docherty	0	0	0	0	0	0	0	0	0	0	0	0
36	FW	ENG	Mitchel Candlin	0 (3)	0	0	0	0	0	0 (1)	0	0 (4)	0	0	0
37	GK	ENG	Brandon Ganley	0	0	0	0	0	0	0	0	0	0	0	0
38	FW	ENG	Joe Cairns	0	0	0	0	0	0	0	0	0	0	0	0

Players not included in matchday squads
No.	Pos.	Nat.	Name
~~4~~ †	DF	ENG	James O'Connor
14	DF	POL	Krystian Bielik *
21	MF	BER	Milan Butterfield
30	FW	ENG	Cameron Peters
~~31~~ †	DF	ENG	Sam Tonks
