= Kory Roberts =

English footballer

Personal information
- Full name: Kory Paul Roberts
- Date of birth: 17 December 1997 (age 28)
- Place of birth: Birmingham, England
- Height: 6 ft 0 in (1.84 m)
- Position: Defender

Team information
- Current team: Stratford Town

Youth career
- 2014–2016: Walsall

Senior career*
Years	Team	Apps	(Gls)
2016–2020	Walsall	26	(0)
2020–2022	Bromley	22	(1)
2021	→ AFC Telford United (loan)	5	(0)
2021–2022	→ Rushall Olympic (loan)	6	(1)
2022	→ Dartford (loan)	18	(2)
2022–2023	Hemel Hempstead Town	38	(2)
2024	Rushall Olympic	7	(0)
2024–2025	Hednesford Town	23	(0)
2025–	Stratford Town	0	(0)
- * Club domestic league appearances and goals as of 10:12, 2 August 2025 (UTC)

Kory Paul Roberts (born 17 December 1997) is an English professional footballer who plays as a defender for Southern League Premier Division Central club Stratford Town.

== Career ==
Roberts was born in Birmingham, West Midlands. He joined the Walsall academy at the age of 16 from Birmingham's Sunday football scene, after a failed trial at Birmingham City. He signed his first professional contract with Walsall in May 2016. On 31 December 2016, Roberts made his Football League debut against Oxford United in a 0–0 draw.

He signed a new contract with Walsall in October 2018, running until June 2020.

Following his release from Walsall, he signed for Bromley in September 2020. On 29 September 2021, he signed for National League North side AFC Telford United on a two-month loan deal. On 26 November 2021, he was on the move again, this time to a level below when he signed for Southern Football League Premier Division Central side Rushall Olympic on loan until January 2022.

On 28 January 2022, Roberts joined Dartford on loan.

On 31 May 2022, it was confirmed that Roberts would leave Bromley following the end of his contract.

On 22 July 2022, Roberts signed for Hemel Hempstead Town.

In March 2024, Roberts returned to National League North side Rushall Olympic on a permanent deal having previously enjoyed a loan spell with the club.

On 22 June 2024, Roberts joined Northern Premier League Division One West side Hednesford Town.

On 1 August 2025, Roberts joined Southern League Premier Division Central club Stratford Town.

== Honours ==
Hednesford Town

- Northern Premier League Division One West play-offs: 2025

== Career statistics ==
As of match played 20 April 2024

Appearances and goals by club, season and competition
Club	Season	League			FA Cup		EFL Cup		Other		Total	
Club	Season	Division	Apps	Goals	Apps	Goals	Apps	Goals	Apps	Goals	Apps	Goals
Walsall	2016–17	League One	4	0	0	0	0	0	0	0	4	0
Walsall	2017–18	League One	20	0	0	0	1	0	3 (Note: Three appearances in EFL Trophy)	0	24	0
Walsall	2018–19	League One	0	0	0	0	0	0	0	0	0	0
Walsall	2019–20	League Two	2	0	0	0	0	0	2 (Note: Two appearances in EFL Trophy)	0	4	0
Walsall	Total		26	0	0	0	1	0	5	0	32	0
Bromley	2020–21	National League	22	1	2	0	—		2 (Note: Two appearances in FA Trophy)	0	26	1
Bromley	2021–22	National League	0	0	0	0	—		0	0	0	0
Bromley	Total		22	1	2	0	—		2	0	26	1
AFC Telford United (loan)	2021–22	National League North	5	0	—		—		—		5	0
Rushall Olympic (loan)	2021–22	SL Premier Division Central	6	1	—		—		4 (Note: Two appearances in the Southern League Cup, one in the Staffordshire Senior Cup and one appearance the Walsall Senior Cup)	1	10	2
Dartford (loan)	2021–22	National League South	18	2	—		—		4 (Note: One appearance in the FA Trophy) (Note: One appearance in the London Senior Cup) (Note: One appearance in the Kent Senior Cup) (Note: One appearance in the National League South Play-Offs)	0	22	2
Hemel Hempstead Town	2022–23	National League South	38	2	0	0	—		1 (Note: One appearance in the FA Trophy)	0	39	2
Rushall Olympic	2023–24	National League North	7	0	0	0	—		0	0	7	0
Hednesford Town	2024–25	Northern Premier League Division One West	23	0	10	2	—		6 (Note: Two appearances in FA Trophy, two appearances in Walsall Senior Cup, two appearances in Staffordshire Senior Cup)	0	39	2
Career total			145	6	12	2	1	0	22	1	180	9
