= Jordan Sangha =

English footballer

Personal information
- Full name: Jordan Phillip John Sangha
- Date of birth: 4 January 1998 (age 28)
- Place of birth: West Bromwich, England
- Position: Midfielder

Team information
- Current team: Gornal Athletic

Youth career
- 2006–2016: Walsall

Senior career*
Years	Team	Apps	(Gls)
2016–2019	Walsall	0	(0)
2016–2017	→ A.F.C. Telford United (loan)	4	(0)
2017	→ Rushall Olympic (loan)		
2018	→ Leamington (loan)	2	(0)
2018	→ Ashton United (loan)	4	(0)
2019	Evesham United		
2019–2020	Wrens Nest		
2020–	Gornal Athletic		
- * Club domestic league appearances and goals as of 12:35, 27 September 2020 (UTC)

Jordan Sangha (born 4 January 1998) is an English former professional footballer and current semi-professional footballer who plays as a midfielder for Gornal Athletic.

== Playing career ==
Sangha was born in West Bromwich, and joined the Walsall youth-team at the age of eight. He was named as Apprentice of the Season for the 2015–16 season. On 22 September 2016, he joined National League North side A.F.C. Telford United on a one-month loan deal. He made his senior debut two days later, in a 0–0 draw with Chorley at the New Bucks Head, coming on as a 75th-minute substitute for David Hibbert. He made three further appearances for the "Bucks". On 8 November, he made his first-team debut for Walsall after coming on as a 78th-minute substitute for Amadou Bakayoko in a 1–0 victory over Leicester City U23 at the King Power Stadium. He signed a new contract with the "Saddlers" in March 2017.

On 20 October 2017, he joined Rushall Olympic of the Northern Premier League Premier Division on a one-month loan deal. On 22 March 2018, he returned to the National League North on a one-month loan at Leamington. He made just two appearances for the "Brakes", featuring for a total of just 26 minutes.

On 11 September 2018, he joined National League North side Ashton United on loan, and made his debut for the "Robins" four days later in a 2–0 win at Hereford.

He was released by Walsall at the end of the 2018–19 season and moved into non-league football with Evesham United, Wrens Nest and Gornal Athletic.

== Statistics ==
Club	Season	League			FA Cup		EFL Cup		Other		Total	
Club	Season	Division	Apps	Goals	Apps	Goals	Apps	Goals	Apps	Goals	Apps	Goals
Walsall	2016–17	EFL League One	0	0	0	0	0	0	1 (Note: Appearance/s in the EFL Trophy)	0	1	0
Walsall	2017–18	EFL League One	0	0	0	0	0	0	1	0	1	0
Walsall	2018–19	EFL League One	0	0	0	0	0	0	1	0	1	0
Walsall	Total		0	0	0	0	0	0	3	0	3	0
A.F.C. Telford United (loan)	2016–17	National League North	4	0	0	0	0	0	0	0	4	0
Leamington (loan)	2017–18	National League North	2	0	0	0	0	0	0	0	2	0
Ashton United (loan)	2018–19	National League North	4	0	1	0	0	0	0	0	5	0
Career total (Note: Statistics for Rushall Olympic, Evesham United, Wrens Nest and Gornal Athletic not known)			10	0	1	0	0	0	3	0	14	0
