= Tobias Hayles-Docherty =

English footballer

Personal information
- Full name: Tobias Martin Hayles-Docherty
- Date of birth: 30 January 1999 (age 27)
- Place of birth: Birmingham, England
- Height: 1.78 m (5 ft 10 in)
- Position: Midfielder

Youth career
- –2017: Walsall

Senior career*
| Years | Team | Apps | (Gls) |
| 2017–2019 | Walsall | 1 | (0) |
| 2018 | → Halesowen Town (loan) | 2 | (2) |
- * Club domestic league appearances and goals as of 14:23, 12 January 2020 (UTC)

Tobias Martin Hayles-Docherty (born 30 January 1999) is an English professional footballer who last played as a midfielder for Walsall.

== Playing career ==
Hayles-Docherty came through the Walsall youth team to first make the first team bench in April 2017. He made his EFL League One debut as a 68th-minute substitute for Maziar Kouhyar in a 1–0 defeat to Port Vale at the Bescot Stadium on 25 April 2017.

On 28 September 2018, Hayles-Docherty was sent out on a one-month loan deal at Halesowen Town until 3 November.

He was released by Walsall at the end of the 2018–19 season.

== Career statistics ==
As of match played 30 January 2018

Appearances and goals by club, season and competition
| Club | Season | Division | League | | FA Cup | | EFL Cup | | Other | | Total | |
| Club | Season | Division | Apps | Goals | Apps | Goals | Apps | Goals | Apps | Goals | Apps | Goals |
|---|---|---|---|---|---|---|---|---|---|---|---|---|
| Walsall | 2016–17 | League One | 1 | 0 | 0 | 0 | 0 | 0 | 0 | 0 | 1 | 0 |
| Walsall | 2017–18 | League One | 0 | 0 | 0 | 0 | 0 | 0 | 0 | 0 | 0 | 0 |
| Career total | | | 1 | 0 | 0 | 0 | 0 | 0 | 0 | 0 | 1 | 0 |
