= Callum Cockerill-Mollett =

Irish association football player

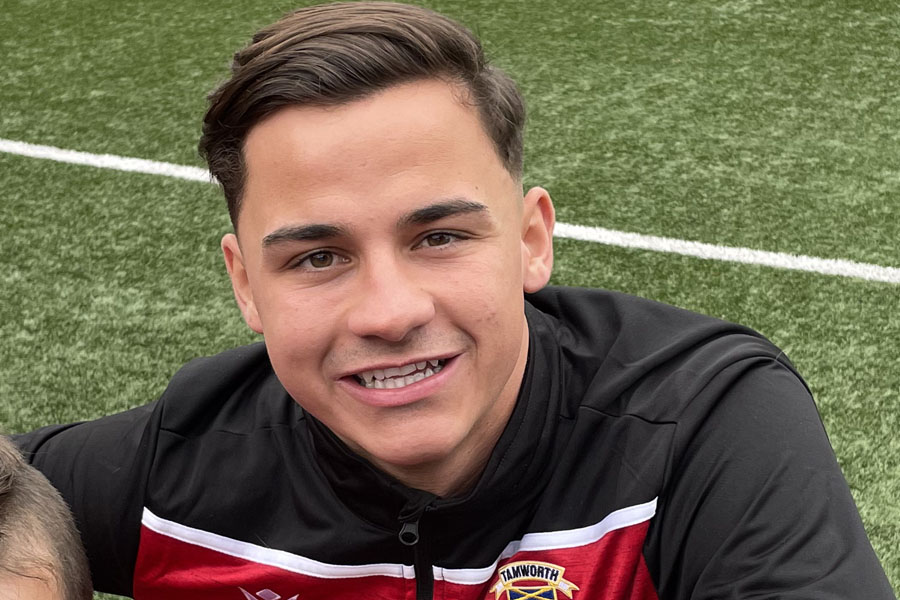
- Cockerill-Mollett in October 2021

Personal information
- Full name: Callum David Cockerill-Mollett
- Date of birth: 15 January 1999 (age 27)
- Place of birth: Leicester, England
- Height: 1.78 m (5 ft 10 in)
- Position: Defender

Team information
- Current team: Leamington
- Number: 3

Youth career
- 2014–2016: Walsall

Senior career*
| Years | Team | Apps | (Gls) |
| 2016–2021 | Walsall | 21 | (0) |
| 2018 | → AFC Telford United (loan) | 2 | (0) |
| 2018–2019 | → Chasetown (loan) | 25 | (2) |
| 2021–2026 | Tamworth | 89 | (3) |
| 2026– | Leamington | 0 | (0) |

International career^{‡}
| 2017 | Republic of Ireland U18 | 4 | (0) |
| 2017 | Republic of Ireland U19 | 2 | (0) |
- * Club domestic league appearances and goals as of 18:00, 10 June 2026 (UTC) ‡ National team caps and goals as of 18:00, 10 June 2026 (UTC)

Callum David Cockerill-Mollett (born 15 January 1999) is an Irish footballer who plays as a defender for Southern League Premier Division Central side Leamington. Cockerill-Mollett was born in England and has represented the Republic of Ireland at U18 level and U19 level.

== Playing career ==
=== Walsall ===
Cockerill-Mollett came through the Walsall youth team and signed a two-year professional contract in August 2016. He made his first team debut in a 5–2 win over Grimsby Town in an EFL Trophy group stage match at Bescot Stadium on 30 August 2016.

At the end of the 2016–17 season, Cockerill-Mollett was shortlisted for the League One Apprentice of the Year award but lost out to Scunthorpe United's Lewis Butroid. He was, however, named Walsall's Apprentice of the Year and helped the club's Development Squad win the Walsall Senior Cup and Central League North West Division title.

On 15 September 2018, Cockerill-Mollett joined Telford United on a one-month youth loan.

Cockerill-Mollett subsequently joined Chasetown on a 3-month loan deal. and scored on his league debut.

His contract was extended for 12 months by Walsall at the end of the 2018–19 season.

Cockerill-Mollett was released by the club at the end of the 2020–21 season.

=== Tamworth ===
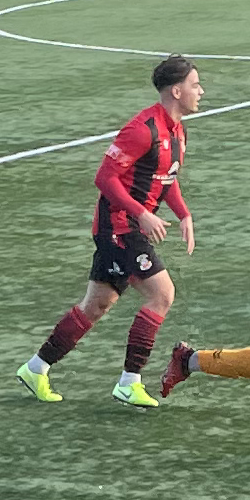
Cockerill-Mollett playing for Tamworth in January 2022.

On 11 October 2021, it was confirmed that Cockerill-Mollett had signed for Southern League Premier Division Central side Tamworth.

After a period of matches on the bench, Cockerill-Mollett made his Tamworth debut on 30 October 2021, in an FA Trophy 3rd qualifying round fixture away at Spalding United. He played for 81 minutes, before being replaced by Cameron Howkins. The match finished 1-1, with Tamworth winning the tie 4-2 on penalties.

Cockerill-Mollett made his Southern League Premier Division Central debut for Tamworth in an away fixture with Needham Market on 20 November 2021, but it was a debut to forget as the player was substituted in the 28th minute for after going down with an injury, he was replaced by Martin Riley. Tamworth lost the match 1-0.

Following a long lay off Cockerill-Mollett returned to first team action in a Southern League Premier Division Central fixture away at high flying Coalville Town on 15 January 2022. Cockerill-Mollett joined the action in the 75th minute in place of Jack Concannon, with Tamworth succumbing to a 4-0 defeat.

Following the departures of Gary Smith and Thomas Baillie, and with Scott Rickards in caretaker charge, Cockerill-Mollett was named in the starting lineup for the Southern League Premier Division Central home match against Alvechurch on 12 February 2022. Cockerill-Mollett was withdrawn at half time for Jordan Clement, after the player picked up an injury, and it was Clement who helped Tamworth salvage a 1-1 draw, with a 92nd minute goal.

On 17 June 2022, it was confirmed via a club newsletter that Cockerill-Mollett would return to pre-season with Tamworth for the 2022–23 season. On 2 August 2022, Tamworth confirmed that following an impressive showing in pre-season, Cockerill-Mollett had signed a deal to remain with the club for the 2022–23 season.

Cockerill-Mollett made his first appearance for Tamworth of the 2022–23 season on 16 August 2022 at home to Rushall Olympic, and also scored his first goal for the club, netting on the 55th minute to put Tamworth into a 2–1 lead, with Tamworth going on to win the match 3–1. He went on to make 42 appearances for The Lambs as they secured the Southern League Premier Division Central title and promotion to National League North.

=== Leamington ===
Following his departure from Tamworth, Cockerill-Mollett signed for newly relegated Southern League Premier Division Central side Leamington on 10 June 2026.

== International career ==
=== Republic of Ireland ===
Cockerill-Mollett was called up to the Republic of Ireland U18s squad for the first time for the Slovakia Cup Tournament in April 2017. He made four appearances in the competition, making his debut as a substitute against the Czech Republic before starting against Russia and Turkey and coming off the bench for their defeat to host-nation Slovakia.

== Career statistics ==
As of end of 2025–26 season

| Club | Season | Division | League | | FA Cup | | EFL Cup | | Other | | Total | |
| Club | Season | Division | Apps | Goals | Apps | Goals | Apps | Goals | Apps | Goals | Apps | Goals |
|---|---|---|---|---|---|---|---|---|---|---|---|---|
| Walsall | 2016–17 | League One | 0 | 0 | 0 | 0 | 0 | 0 | 2 (Note: Appearance(s) in EFL Trophy) | 0 | 2 | 0 |
| Walsall | 2017–18 | League One | 1 | 0 | 0 | 0 | 0 | 0 | 0 | 0 | 1 | 0 |
| Walsall | 2018–19 | League One | 0 | 0 | 0 | 0 | 0 | 0 | 1 | 0 | 1 | 0 |
| Walsall | 2019–20 | League Two | 9 | 0 | 2 | 0 | 1 | 0 | 3 | 0 | 15 | 0 |
| Walsall | 2020–21 | League Two | 11 | 0 | 1 | 0 | 0 | 0 | 1 | 0 | 13 | 0 |
| Walsall | Total | | 21 | 0 | 3 | 0 | 1 | 0 | 7 | 0 | 32 | 0 |
| AFC Telford United (loan) | 2018–19 | National League North | 2 | 0 | — | | — | | — | | 2 | 0 |
| Chasetown (loan) | 2018–19 | Northern Premier League; Division One West | 25 | 2 | — | | — | | 1 (Note: Appearance in Staffordshire Senior Cup.) | 0 | 26 | 2 |
| Tamworth | 2021–22 | Southern League; Premier Central | 4 | 0 | 0 | 0 | — | | 3 (Note: One appearance in FA Trophy and two appearances in Birmingham Senior Cup) | 0 | 7 | 0 |
| Tamworth | 2022–23 | Southern League; Premier Central | 36 | 3 | 1 | 0 | — | | 5 (Note: Four appearances in FA Trophy and one appearance in Birmingham Senior Cup) | 1 | 42 | 4 |
| Tamworth | 2023–24 | National League North | 21 | 0 | 3 | 0 | — | | 0 | 0 | 24 | 0 |
| Tamworth | 2024–25 | National League | 20 | 0 | 1 | 0 | — | | 3 (Note: Appearances in National League Cup) | 1 | 24 | 1 |
| Tamworth | 2025–26 | National League | 8 | 0 | 0 | 0 | — | | 4 | 0 | 12 | 0 |
| Tamworth | Total | | 89 | 3 | 5 | 0 | — | | 15 | 2 | 109 | 5 |
| Leamington | 2026–27 | Southern League; Premier Central | 0 | 0 | 0 | 0 | — | | 0 | 0 | 0 | 0 |
| Career total | | | 137 | 5 | 8 | 0 | 1 | 0 | 23 | 2 | 169 | 7 |

== Honors ==
Tamworth

- Southern League Premier Division Central: 2022–23
- National League North: 2023–24
