= Florent Cuvelier =

Belgian footballer

Personal information
- Full name: Florent Paul Pierre Christian Cuvelier
- Date of birth: 12 September 1992 (age 34)
- Place of birth: Anderlecht, Belgium
- Height: 6 ft 0 in (1.83 m)
- Position: Midfielder

Youth career
- 1998–2000: Excelsior Biévène
- 2000–2002: La Louvière
- 2002–2008: Mouscron
- 2008–2010: Portsmouth
- 2010–2011: Stoke City

Senior career*
Years	Team	Apps	(Gls)
2011–2013	Stoke City	0	(0)
2012	→ Walsall (loan)	18	(4)
2012	→ Walsall (loan)	15	(2)
2013	→ Peterborough United (loan)	1	(0)
2013–2016	Sheffield United	19	(0)
2014	→ Port Vale (loan)	1	(0)
2015	→ Burton Albion (loan)	1	(1)
2016–2018	Walsall	45	(0)
2018–2019	Morecambe	0	(0)
Total		100	(7)

International career
2008	Belgium U16	4	(0)
2008–2009	Belgium U17	12	(0)
2009–2010	Belgium U18	10	(0)
2010–2011	Belgium U19	18	(2)
2010–2012	Belgium U20	3	(0)
2012	Belgium U21	1	(0)
- * Club domestic league appearances and goals

Florent Paul Pierre Christian Cuvelier (born 12 September 1992) is a Belgian former professional footballer who played as a midfielder.

Cuvelier began his career with Mouscron before joining the Academy of English side Portsmouth. Due to Portsmouth's financial demise, Cuvelier signed for Stoke City in the summer of 2010. At Stoke, he has spent time out on loan at Walsall and Peterborough United. He joined Sheffield United in September 2013 for an undisclosed fee. He joined Port Vale on loan in January 2014 and picked up a serious injury during the loan spell. After returning to fitness, he was loaned to Burton Albion in March 2015. He signed with Walsall in June 2016 and played there for two seasons. He joined Morecambe for a brief spell in October 2018.

== Career ==
=== Stoke City ===
Cuvelier started playing football for his local side Mouscron before moving to England to play for Portsmouth's youth team. He spent just a year on the south coast before joining Stoke City in July 2010. He rejected contract offers from Manchester City, Tottenham Hotspur and Fulham. Cuvelier spent the 2010–11 season with the academy before becoming a regular with the reserves.

On 27 January 2012 Cuvelier joined League One side Walsall on a month-long loan. He made his professional debut four days later against Notts County. He scored his first professional goal against Oldham Athletic in a 2–1 defeat at Boundary Park. After impressing "Saddlers" manager Dean Smith, Cuvelier extended his loan until the end of the 2011–12 season. He was nominated for the League One Player of the Month award for his performances in March 2012. He returned to Stoke after playing 18 matches for Walsall, scoring four goals. He signed a new two-year contract with Stoke in May 2012.

Cuvelier returned to Walsall on a six-month loan in July 2012. He scored against his old club Portsmouth on 15 September 2012 in a 2–1 win. In total he played 17 times in his second spell at the Bescot Stadium, scoring three goals. On 27 March 2013, Cuvelier joined Championship side Peterborough United on loan until the end of the 2012–13 season. He played once for Peterborough before returning to Stoke where he appeared on the bench for the first time against Southampton in the final match of the 2012–13 season.

=== Sheffield United ===
On 2 September 2013, Cuvelier joined League One side Sheffield United on a three-year contract for an undisclosed fee. He started six games at the start of the 2013–14 campaign under manager David Weir but lost his first-team place after Nigel Clough took charge in October; Clough stated that Cuvelier was available to go out on loan during the January transfer window. On 16 January 2014, he joined league rivals Port Vale on loan until the end of the season. Manager Micky Adams stated that "He's had very little football at Sheffield United so if there is one worry it is that maybe he might need four or five games to get himself up to full speed. Really we can't afford four or five games, we need him to hit the floor running if he possibly can." He made his debut at Vale Park three days later. He was forced to leave the pitch on a stretcher on 36 minutes after picking up a knee injury. He was later ruled out for the rest of the season after it was found that he had torn his anterior cruciate ligament (ACL).

He returned to full fitness in November 2014. He returned to first-team action on 6 December as a late substitute in a 3–0 FA Cup victory over Plymouth Argyle and provided the assist for the third goal. He joined Burton Albion on loan for the remainder of the 2014–15 season on 6 March 2015. The next day he came off the bench to score the only goal of the game at Hartlepool United. Impressed by manager Jimmy Floyd Hasselbaink and living just ten minutes drive from the Pirelli Stadium, Cuvelier stated that he would be interested in making his stay with Burton permanent. However, he was unable to recover from a hamstring injury picked up during his appearance against Hartlepool and played no further part in Burton's title-winning season.

He made nine appearances in the 2015–16 campaign. He was publicly praised by manager Nigel Adkins in November and February for his "first class attitude". He was released by new manager Chris Wilder in May 2016.

=== Walsall ===
In June 2016, Cuvelier returned to Walsall, signing a one-year contract. He struggled with an ankle knock and ear infection in the first half of the 2016–17 season, before going on to struggle with a calf injury. Despite these setbacks he signed a new one-year contract in March 2017, with manager Jon Whitney saying "he's the type of person you can build your team around." He was restricted to 23 appearances across the 2017–18 season due to the form of George Dobson. Speaking in April he stated that the appointment of new manager Dean Keates had the players "buzzing" as Cuvelier also made a return to the starting eleven at the Bescot Stadium under the new manager. However, he was released by Walsall at the end of the 2017–18 season.

=== Morecambe ===
On 26 October 2018, Cuvelier joined Morecambe on a three-month contract and said that "the last couple of months have been difficult, they've been a roller coaster and I was delivering pizza just to get some money coming in". Manager Jim Bentley had brought Cuvelier to the Globe Arena after injuries to James Sinclair, Lamin Jagne, Alex Kenyon, Andrew Tutte, Andrew Fleming and Aaron Wildig. However, he featured in only one EFL Trophy game for the "Shrimps" before his contract expired on 25 January.

== International career ==
Cuvelier has progressed through Belgium's youth team and was captain of the Belgium U19 squad.

== Style of play ==
Speaking in January 2014, Walsall Advertiser reporter Michael Beardmore described Cuvelier as "a creative, energetic attacking midfielder and... for such a young player he had a really mature head on his shoulders.

== Career statistics ==
Appearances and goals by club, season and competition
Club	Season	League			FA Cup		EFL Cup		Other		Total	
Club	Season	Division	Apps	Goals	Apps	Goals	Apps	Goals	Apps	Goals	Apps	Goals
Stoke City	2011–12	Premier League	0	0	0	0	0	0	0	0	0	0
Stoke City	2012–13	Premier League	0	0	0	0	0	0	0	0	0	0
Stoke City	Total		0	0	0	0	0	0	0	0	0	0
Walsall (loan)	2011–12	League One	18	4	—		—		—		18	4
Walsall (loan)	2012–13	League One	15	2	0	0	2	0	1 (Note: Appearance(s) in the Football League Trophy / EFL Trophy.)	1	17	3
Walsall (loan)	Total		33	6	0	0	2	0	1	1	36	7
Peterborough United (loan)	2012–13	Championship	1	0	—		—		—		1	0
Sheffield United	2013–14	League One	7	0	0	0	—		1	0	8	0
Sheffield United	2014–15	League One	3	0	1	0	1	0	0	0	5	0
Sheffield United	2015–16	League One	9	0	0	0	0	0	0	0	9	0
Sheffield United	Total		19	0	1	0	1	0	1	0	22	0
Port Vale (loan)	2013–14	League One	1	0	—		—		—		1	0
Burton Albion (loan)	2014–15	League Two	1	1	—		—		—		1	1
Walsall	2016–17	League One	22	0	0	0	0	0	1	0	23	0
Walsall	2017–18	League One	23	0	0	0	0	0	0	0	23	0
Walsall	2018–19	League One	0	0	0	0	0	0	0	0	0	0
Walsall	Total		45	0	0	0	0	0	1	0	46	0
Morecambe	2018–19	League Two	0	0	0	0	—		1	0	1	0
Career total			100	7	1	0	3	0	4	1	108	8
