= 2016–17 Walsall F.C. season =

Walsall
2016–17 season
- Chairman: Jeff Bonser
- Manager: Jon Whitney
- Stadium: Bescot Stadium
- League One: 14th
- FA Cup: First round (vs. Macclesfield Town)
- EFL Cup: First round (vs. Yeovil Town)
- EFL Trophy: Second round (vs. Oldham Athletic)
- Top goalscorer: League: Erhun Oztumer (15); All: Erhun Oztumer (15)
Home colours	Away colours

The 2016–17 season was Walsall's 129th season in their existence and their tenth consecutive season in League One. Along with competing in League One, the club participated in the FA Cup, League Cup and EFL Trophy.

The season covers the period from 1 July 2016 to 30 June 2017.

== Transfers ==
=== In ===
Date from	Position	Nationality	Name	From	Fee	Ref.
1 July 2016	CM	(Bermuda)	Milan Butterfield	Robin Hood	Free transfer	
1 July 2016	CM	(Belgium)	Florent Cuvelier	Sheffield United	Free transfer	
1 July 2016	DM	(England)	Joe Edwards	Colchester United	Free transfer	
1 July 2016	AM	(England)	Erhun Oztumer	Peterborough United	Free transfer	
8 July 2016	CB	(England)	Theo Vassell	Oldham Athletic	Free transfer	
11 July 2016	AM	(Belgium)	Franck Moussa	Southend United	Free transfer	
18 July 2016	CF	(Canada)	Simeon Jackson	Blackburn Rovers	Free transfer	
1 August 2016	RW	(Cyprus)	Andreas Makris	Anorthosis Famagusta	£250,000	

=== Out ===
Date from	Position	Nationality	Name	To	Fee	Ref.
1 July 2016	RB	(Cyprus)	Jason Demetriou	Southend United (Note: Following Demetriou turning down a new contract, he signed for Southend United.)	Rejected contract	
1 July 2016	CB	(England)	Paul Downing	Milton Keynes Dons (Note: Following Downing turning down a new contract, he signed for Milton Keynes Dons.)	Rejected contract	
1 July 2016	LW	(Republic of Ireland)	Anthony Forde	Rotherham United	Undisclosed	
1 July 2016	LW	(Slovakia)	Milan Lalkovič	Portsmouth (Note: Following Lalkovič turning down a new contract, he signed for Portsmouth.)	Rejected contract	
1 July 2016	CM	(England)	Sam Mantom	Scunthorpe United	Rejected contract	
1 July 2016	LW	(England)	Jordan Murphy	Free agent	Released	
1 July 2016	AM	(England)	Levi Rowley	Free agent	Released	
1 July 2016	AM	(Saint Kitts and Nevis)	Romaine Sawyers	Brentford (Note: Following Sawyers turning down a new contract, he signed for Brentford.)	Rejected contract	
1 July 2016	LB	(England)	Andy Taylor	Blackpool	Rejected contract	
5 July 2016	SS	(England)	Jordan Cook	Luton Town	Rejected contract	
14 July 2016	CF	(Wales)	Tom Bradshaw	Barnsley	Undisclosed	
31 August 2016	LB	(England)	Rico Henry	Brentford	£1,500,000	

=== Loans in ===
Date from	Position	Nationality	Name	From	Date until	Ref.
1 July 2016	CB	(England)	George Dobson	West Ham United	End of season	
1 July 2016	CB	(England)	Jason McCarthy	Southampton	End of season	(Note: On 1 January 2017, Jason McCarthy's loan from Southampton was extended until the end of the season.)
28 July 2016	LW	(England)	Josh Ginnelly	Burnley	3 January 2017	
26 August 2016	CB	(Republic of Ireland)	Kevin Toner	Aston Villa	3 January 2017	
31 August 2016	LB	(England)	Scott Laird	Scunthorpe United	3 January 2017	
12 January 2017	LB	(England)	Scott Laird	Scunthorpe United	End of season	
12 January 2017	CB	(Republic of Ireland)	Eoghan O'Connell	Celtic	End of season	
31 January 2017	LW	(England)	Will Randall	Wolverhampton Wanderers	End of season	

=== Loans out ===
Date from	Position	Nationality	Name	To	Date until	Ref.
4 July 2016	GK	(England)	Liam Roberts	Chester	End of season	
11 July 2016	RB	(England)	Theo Vassell	Chester	1 January	
17 January 2017	RB	(England)	Theo Vassell	Chester	End of season	

== Competitions ==
=== Pre-season friendlies ===
Win Draw Loss

9 July 2016	Walsall	1–2	Norwich City	St George's Park, Burton upon Trent
13:00	Vassell 56'	Report	Bennett 24'; Jerome 60'

16 July 2016	Solihull Moors	0–5	Walsall	Damson Park, Solihull
15:00		Report	Cuvelier 5'; Bakayoko 8' 83'; Oztumer 23' 37'	Attendance: 415; Referee: Ollie Yates

19 July 2016	Walsall	1–1	Birmingham City	Bescot Stadium, Walsall
19:45	Bakayoko 53' (pen.)	Report	Caddis 80'

23 July 2016	Walsall	0–2	Derby County	Bescot Stadium, Walsall
15:00		Report	Bent 35'; Hendrick 72'

26 July 2016	Notts County	3–2	Walsall	Meadow Lane, Nottingham
19:45	Hollis 10'; Forte 11'; Stead 66'	Report	Bakayoko 71', 85'

30 July 2016	Luton Town	0–1	Walsall	Kenilworth Road, Luton
15:00

=== League One ===
==== League table ====
Pos	Team	Pld	W	D	L	GF	GA	GD	Pts
12	Milton Keynes Dons	46	16	13	17	60	58	+2	61
13	Charlton Athletic	46	14	18	14	60	53	+7	60
14	Walsall	46	14	16	16	51	58	−7	58
15	AFC Wimbledon	46	13	18	15	52	55	−3	57
16	Northampton Town	46	14	11	21	60	73	−13	53

Source: BBC Sport
Rules for classification: 1) Points; 2) Goal difference; 3) Number of goals scored

==== Matches ====
6 August 2016 1	Walsall	3–1	AFC Wimbledon	Bescot
15:00 BST	Oztumer 7'; Jackson 38', 72'; Moussa (yellow card) 80'; Henry (yellow card) 90'	Report	Robinson (yellow card) 37'; Taylor 90'; Parrett (yellow card) 90+2'	Stadium: Bescot Stadium; Attendance: 5,845 (1,049 Wimbledon supporters); Referee: Charles Breakspear

13 August 2016 2	Oldham Athletic	0–0	Walsall	Oldham
15:00 BST	Law (yellow card) 87'	Report	Osbourne (yellow card) 89'	Stadium: Boundary Park; Attendance: 3,914; Referee: David Webb

16 August 2016 3	Chesterfield	2–0	Walsall	Chesterfield
19:45 BST	Nolan (yellow card) 37'; Evans 75', 79'	Report		Stadium: Proact Stadium; Attendance: 5,406 (478 Walsall supporters); Referee: Graham Salisbury

20 August 2016 4	Walsall	1–2	Charlton Athletic	Bescot
15:00 BST	O'Connor (yellow card) 68'; Morris 72'	Report	Ajose 42', 74'; Solly (yellow card) 67'	Stadium: Bescot Stadium; Attendance: 4,586 (739 Charlton supporters); Referee: Christopher Sarginson

27 August 2016 5	Walsall	3–3	Bury	Bescot
15:00 BST	Morris 6'; Oztumer 14'; Jackson 32'; Edwards (yellow card) 48'; Dobson (yellow card) 60'	Report	Barnett 47'; Vaughan 49' (yellow card) 65'; Mayor 66' (yellow card) 67'; Soares (yellow card) 88'	Stadium: Bescot Stadium; Attendance: 4,393 (310 Bury supporters); Referee: Seb Stockbridge

10 September 2016 6	Northampton Town	2–0	Walsall	Northampton
15:00 BST	Taylor 23'; Gorré (yellow card) 44'; Revell 78' (pen.); Moloney (yellow card) 90+3'	Report	McCarthy (yellow card) 78'; Bakayoko (yellow card) 90+2'	Stadium: Sixfields Stadium; Attendance: 5,538 (601 Walsall supporters); Referee: Gavin Ward

13 September 2016 7	Bristol Rovers	1–1	Walsall	Bristol
19:45 BST	Taylor 27' (pen.); Sinclair (yellow card) 70'	Report	Oztumer 16' (yellow card) 33'; Moussa (yellow card) 47'	Stadium: Memorial Stadium; Attendance: 7,805 (170 Walsall supporters)

17 September 2016 8	Walsall	1–0	Bolton Wanderers	Walsall
15:00 BST	Edwards (red card) 16'; McCarthy 25'; Etheridge (yellow card) 76'	Report	Taylor (yellow card) 60'; Anderson (yellow card) 65' (yellow-red card) 90+4'; Beevers (yellow card) 86'; Moxey (yellow card) 89'	Stadium: The Banks's Stadium; Attendance: 5,962; Referee: Trevor Kettle

24 September 2016 9	Peterborough United	1–1	Walsall	Peterborough
15:00 BST	Maddison 27'; Nichols (yellow card) 31'	Report	Jackson 17'; Osbourne (yellow card) 84'	Stadium: ABAX Stadium; Attendance: 4,906 (314 Walsall supporters); Referee: Ben Toner

27 September 2016 10	Walsall	1–4	Scunthorpe United	Walsall
19:45 BST	Kinsella (yellow card) 10'; Oztumer 45'; Makris (yellow card) 90+2'	Report	Morris 11' (pen.), 13', 82'; Bishop 47'	Stadium: The Banks's Stadium; Attendance: 3,970; Referee: Michael Salisbury

1 October 2016 11	Walsall	2–1	Millwall	Walsall
15:00 BST	Jackson 17'; Moussa 49'	Report	Onyedinma 22'	Stadium: The Banks's Stadium; Attendance: 4,474; Referee: Lee Probert

15 October 2016 12	Walsall	3–2	Shrewsbury Town	Walsall
15:00 BST	Bakayoko 23' (yellow card) 66' (yellow-red card) 90'; Morris 42'; O'Connor (yellow card) 70'; Oztumer 88'	Report	Lancashire 30'; Waring (yellow card) 46'; McGivern (yellow card) 50' (yellow-red card) 65'; Grimmer (yellow card) 56'; Ogogo (yellow card) 56'; Brown 58'; Black (yellow card) 75'	Stadium: The Banks's Stadium; Attendance: 4,759; Referee: Nick Kinseley

18 October 2016 13	Gillingham	1–1	Walsall	Gillingham
19:45 BST	McDonald 25'; Wright (yellow card) 45'; Oshilaja (yellow card) 82'; Knott (yellow card) 89'	Report	Moussa 59'; O'Connor (yellow card) 80'	Stadium: MEMS Priestfield Stadium; Attendance: 5,542; Referee: Charles Breakspear

22 October 2016 14	Swindon Town	0–2	Walsall	Swindon
15:00 BST	Barry (yellow card) 50'	Report	Oztumer 17', 51'; Toner (yellow card) 60'; Bakayoko (yellow card) 90+2'	Stadium: County Ground; Attendance: 6,655; Referee: Darren England

29 October 2016 15	Walsall	1–1	Coventry City	Walsall
15:00 BST	Edwards (yellow card) 1'; Laird (yellow card) 40'; Oztumer (yellow card) 67' (goal) 76'	Report	Rose 36'; Bigirimana (yellow card) 44'; Turnbull (yellow card) 72'; Page (yellow card) 85'	Stadium: The Banks's Stadium; Attendance: 6,719; Referee: Dean Whitestone

12 November 2016 16	Milton Keynes Dons	1–1	Walsall	Milton Keynes
15:00 GMT	Carruthers (yellow card) 41'; Downing (yellow card) 58'; Bowditch 90'	Report	Laird 28'; Preston (yellow card) 42'	Stadium: Stadium mk Attendance: 8,188; Referee: Trevor Kettle

19 November 2016 17	Walsall	1–2	Gillingham	Walsall
15:00 GMT	McCarthy 9'	Report	McDonald 2'; Ehmer (yellow card) 72'; Emmanuel-Thomas 84'	Stadium: The Banks's Stadium; Attendance: 5,420; Referee: John Busby

22 November 2016 18	Rochdale	4–0	Walsall	Rochdale
19:45 GMT	Rathbone 32'; Noble-Lazarus 41'; Davies 76' (pen.), 90+1'	Report	Edwards (yellow card) 52'	Stadium: Crown Oil Arena; Attendance: 1,907; Referee: Andy Haines

26 November 2016 19	Walsall	0–0	Southend United	Walsall
15:00 GMT	Chambers (yellow card) 24'; Laird (yellow card) 90+5'	Report	Timlin (yellow card) 15'; Cox (yellow card) 45'; Ferdinand (yellow card) 90+5'	Stadium: The Banks's Stadium; Attendance: 4,342; Referee: Carl Boyeson

29 November 2016 20	Sheffield United	0–1	Walsall	Sheffield
19:45 GMT		Report	Bakayoko 42'; Preston (yellow card) 62'; Laird (yellow card) 86'	Stadium: Bramall Lane; Attendance: 18,343; Referee: Darren England

10 December 2016 21	Fleetwood Town	2–1	Walsall	Fleetwood
15:00 GMT	McLaughlin (yellow card) 13'; Hunter 42'; Grant 67'	Report	Chambers (yellow card) 8'; Dobson 76'; Preston (yellow card) 90+2'	Stadium: Highbury Stadium; Attendance: 2,708; Referee: Rob Lewis

17 December 2016 22	Walsall	1–1	Bradford City	Walsall
15:00 GMT	Osbourne 49'	Report	Hiwula 53'; Vincelot (yellow card) 90+1'	Stadium: The Banks's Stadium; Attendance: 5,148; Referee: Ben Toner

26 December 2016 23	Port Vale	0–1	Walsall	Stoke-on-Trent
15:00 GMT	Jones (yellow card) 23'	Report	Laird 27'; Osbourne (yellow card) 59'	Stadium: Vale Park; Attendance: 5,854; Referee: Darren Deadman

31 December 2016 24	Oxford United	0–0	Walsall	Oxford
15:00 GMT	Dunkley (yellow card) 40'	Report	Laird (yellow card) 69'	Stadium: The Kassam Stadium; Attendance: 8,340; Referee: Charles Breakspear

2 January 2017 25	Walsall	0–2	Rochdale	Walsall
15:00 GMT	Morris (yellow card) 25'; Etheridge (yellow card) 35'	Report	Henderson 23' (yellow card) 52'; Andrew (yellow card) 55'; Keane (yellow card) 57'; Thompson 74'	Stadium: The Banks's Stadium; Attendance: 4,667; Referee: Seb Stockbridge

14 January 2017 26	Walsall	4–1	Sheffield United	Walsall
15:00 GMT	Bakayoko 5' (yellow card) 61'; McCarthy (yellow card) 44' (goal) 58'; Edwards 67'; Oztumer 76' (pen.)	Report	O'Connell 10'; Done (yellow card) 33'; Fleck (yellow card) 87'	Stadium: The Banks's Stadium; Attendance: 6,899; Referee: Richard Clark

21 January 2017 27	Walsall	3–1	Bristol Rovers	Walsall
15:00 GMT	O'Connell 45'; Jackson 68'; Edwards 73'	Report	Brown (yellow card) 22'; Taylor 82'	Stadium: The Banks's Stadium; Attendance: 6,029; Referee: Nigel Miller

28 January 2017 28	Bury	3–3	Walsall	Bury
15:00 GMT	Vaughan 22'; Burgess (yellow card) 38'; Brown 45' (yellow card) 70'; Soares 90+1'	Report	Preston (yellow card) 59'; Oztumer 71'; McCarthy 76', 79'	Stadium: Gigg Lane; Attendance: 3,280; Referee: Carl Boyeson

1 February 2017 29	Millwall	0–0	Walsall	Bermondsey, London
19:45 GMT		Report	Osbourne (yellow card) 25'; Edwards (yellow card) 75'	Stadium: The Den; Attendance: 7,392; Referee: Darren Deadman

4 February 2017 30	Walsall	2–1	Northampton Town	Walsall
15:00 GMT	Preston 64'; Oztumer 69'; Dobson (yellow card) 90+4'	Report	O'Toole 23'; Richards (yellow card) 36' (penalty missed) 90+5'; Buchanan (yellow card) 87'	Stadium: Bescot Stadium; Attendance: 4,954; Referee: Robert Jones

11 February 2017 31	Bolton Wanderers	4–1	Walsall	Bolton
15:00 GMT	Madine 15'; O'Connor 26' (o.g.); Trotter 30'; Taylor (yellow card) 57'; Spearing (yellow card) 83'; Long 87'	Report	Oztumer 4'; Chambers (yellow card) 79'; Cuvelier (yellow card) 81'	Stadium: Macron Stadium; Attendance: 13,610; Referee: Darren Drysdale

14 February 2017 32	Scunthorpe United	0–0	Walsall	Scunthorpe
19:45 GMT	Ness (yellow card) 18'	Report	Chambers (yellow card) 27'; McCarthy (yellow card) 64'; Edwards (yellow card) 67'	Stadium: Glanford Park; Attendance: 3,168; Referee: Graham Salisbury

18 February 2017 33	Walsall	2–0	Peterborough United	Walsall
15:00 GMT	Chambers (yellow card) 50'; Jackson (yellow card) 64'; Bakayoko (yellow card) 79'; Oztumer 90+2'; Dobson (yellow card) 90+5'; Morris 90+7'	Report	Grant (yellow card) 34'; McGee (yellow card) 90+4'; Forrester (red card) 90+4'	Stadium: The Banks's Stadium; Attendance: 4,759; Referee: Mark Haywood

25 February 2017 34	AFC Wimbledon	1–0	Walsall	Kingston upon Thames, London
15:00 GMT	Reeves (yellow card) 64'; Taylor 68'	Report	Osbourne (yellow card) 76'	Stadium: Kingsmeadow; Attendance: 4,586; Referee: John Busby

4 March 2017 35	Walsall	2–0	Oldham Athletic	Walsall
15:00 GMT	Etheridge (yellow card) 59'; Oztumer 79' (pen.); Bakayoko (yellow card) 82' (goal) 90+2'	Report	Croft (red card) 16'; Wilson (yellow card) 39' (yellow-red card) 82'; Clarke (yellow card) 78'	Stadium: The Banks's Stadium; Attendance: 6,003; Referee: John Brooks

7 March 2017 36	Walsall	1–0	Chesterfield	Walsall
19:45 GMT	Laird 53'	Report	Grimshaw (yellow card) 81'	Stadium: The Banks's Stadium; Attendance: 3,963; Referee: Robert Lewis

11 March 2017 37	Charlton Athletic	1–1	Walsall	Charlton, London
15:00 GMT	Watt 61'; Byrne (yellow card) 76'; Jackson (yellow card) 84'	Report	Jackson 44'; Osbourne (yellow card) 69'	Stadium: The Valley; Attendance: 9,900; Referee: Nick Kinseley

14 March 2017 38	Walsall	0–1	Fleetwood Town	Walsall
19:45 GMT		Report	Bolger 22'	Stadium: The Banks's Stadium; Attendance: 3,890; Referee: Trevor Kettle

18 March 2017 39	Southend United	3–2	Walsall	Southend-on-Sea
15:00 GMT	Inniss (yellow card) 49'; Ranger 63'; Ferdinand 76'; Cox 83'; Coker (yellow card) 84'	Report	Moussa 18', 25'; O'Connor (yellow card) 82'	Stadium: Roots Hall; Attendance: 6,756; Referee: Robert Jones

1 April 2017 40	Bradford City	1–0	Walsall	Bradford
15:00 GMT	Vincelot (yellow card) 12'; Clarke 58' (yellow card) 66'	Report	Makris (yellow card) 20'	Stadium: Valley Parade; Attendance: 17,880; Referee: Michael Salisbury

8 April 2017 41	Walsall	1–1	Oxford United	Walsall
15:00 BST	McCarthy (yellow card) 35'; Makris 48'	Report	Carroll (yellow card) 38'; Maguire 74'	Stadium: Bescot Stadium; Attendance: 5,417; Referee: Darren Handley

14 April 2017 42	Shrewsbury Town	1–1	Walsall	Shrewsbury
15:00 BST	Deegan (yellow card) 55'; Payne 70'	Report	Morris 35'	Stadium: New Meadow; Attendance: 6,801; Referee: Nigel Miller

17 April 2017 43	Walsall	1–0	Swindon Town	Walsall
15:00 BST	O'Connor (yellow card) 56'; Edwards 85'	Report		Stadium: The Banks's Stadium; Attendance: 5,196; Referee: Ross Joyce

22 April 2017 44	Coventry City	1–0	Walsall	Coventry
15:00	Thomas 39'	Report	O'Connell (yellow card) 54' (yellow-red card) 70'	Stadium: Ricoh Arena; Attendance: 9,284; Referee: Darren Drysdale

25 April 2017 45	Walsall	0–1	Port Vale	Walsall
19:45 BST	Roberts (yellow card) 32'	Report	Eagles 85'; Bikey (yellow card) 90+2'	Stadium: The Banks's Stadium; Attendance: 4,266; Referee: John Busby

30 April 2017 46	Walsall	1–4	Milton Keynes Dons	Walsall
12:00 BST	Oztumer 84'	Report	Muirhead 11'; Reeves 32'; O'Keefe 71'; Barnes 85'	Stadium: The Banks's Stadium; Attendance: 5,004; Referee: Mark Brown

=== FA Cup ===
5 November 2016 First round	Walsall	0–1	Macclesfield Town	Walsall
15:00 GMT	Etheridge (yellow card) 23'	Report	McCombe 23'; Sampson (yellow card) 25'	Stadium: The Banks's Stadium; Attendance: 2,334; Referee: Brett Huxtable

=== EFL Cup ===
9 August 2016 First round	Walsall	0–2 (a.e.t.)	Yeovil Town	Walsall
19:45 BST	Preston (yellow card) 79'; Henry (yellow card) 90+4'; Edwards (yellow card) 106'	Report	Dawson (yellow card) 41'; Campbell 103'; Dolan 111' (yellow card) 112'; Eaves (yellow card) 114'	Stadium: Bescot Stadium; Attendance: 2,699; Referee: Rob Jones

=== EFL Trophy ===
Pos	Div	Team	Pld	W	PW	PL	L	GF	GA	GD	Pts	Qualification
1	L1	Walsall	3	3	0	0	0	8	3	+5	9	Advance to Round 2
2	ACA	Leicester City U21	3	1	1	0	1	1	1	0	5	Advance to Round 2
3	L1	Sheffield United	3	1	0	1	1	5	4	+1	4	
4	L2	Grimsby Town	3	0	0	0	3	4	10	−6	0	

Source: Sky Sports

30 August 2016 Group stage 1	Walsall	5–2	Grimsby Town	Bescot
19:45 BST	Bakayoko 18', 39', 43'; Morris 61'; Kouhyar 71'; Preston (yellow card) 90'		Boyce 5'; Summerfield 67'; Andrew (yellow card) 67'	Stadium: Bescot Stadium

4 October 2016 Group stage 2	Sheffield United	1–2	Walsall	Sheffield
19:45 BST	Duffy (yellow card) 45+1'; Coutts 78'	Report	Laird 16'; Toner (yellow card) 54'; Bakayoko 66'; Shorrock (yellow card) 90'	Stadium: Bramall Lane; Attendance: 2,619; Referee: Mark Heywood

8 November 2016 Group stage 3	Leicester City U23	0–1	Walsall	Leicester
19:45 GMT		Report	Bakayoko 58'	Stadium: King Power Stadium; Referee: Mark Haywood

13 December 2016 Second round	Walsall	1–3	Oldham Athletic	Walsall
19:45 GMT	Bakayoko 44'	Report	Croft 69'; Burgess 73'; Dunne (yellow card) 86'; Erwin 89'	Stadium: The Banks's Stadium; Attendance: 925; Referee: Nigel Miller

== Squad statistics ==
Numbers in parentheses denote appearances as substitute.
Players with squad numbers struck through and marked † left the club during the playing season.
Players with names in italics and marked * were on loan from another club for the whole of their season with Walsall.
Players listed with no appearances have been in the matchday squad but only as unused substitutes.
Key to positions: GK – Goalkeeper; DF – Defender; MF – Midfielder; FW – Forward

No.	Pos.	Nat.	Name	Apps	Goals	Apps	Goals	Apps	Goals	Apps	Goals	Apps	Goals	Yellow card	Red card
No.	Pos.	Nat.	Name	League		FA Cup		EFL Cup		EFL Trophy		Total		Discipline	
1	GK	PHI	Neil Etheridge	41	0	1	0	1	0	0	0	47	0	4	0
2	MF	ENG	Joe Edwards	43	3	1	0	1	0	2 (1)	0	47 (1)	3	6	1
~~3~~ †	DF	ENG	Rico Henry	2	0	0	0	1	0	0	0	3	0	2	0
3	DF	ENG	Scott Laird *	26 (2)	3	1	0	0	0	2	1	29 (2)	4	4	0
4	DF	ENG	James O'Connor	40	0	0	0	0	0	0	0	40	0	5	0
5	DF	ENG	Jason McCarthy *	46	5	1	0	1	0	4	0	52	5	5	0
6	MF	ENG	George Dobson *	9 (12)	1	0	0	1	0	4	0	14 (12)	1	3	0
7	MF	ENG	Adam Chambers	43	0	1	0	1	0	0 (1)	0	45 (1)	0	5	0
8	MF	BEL	Florent Cuvelier	15 (7)	0	0	0	0	0	1	0	16 (7)	0	1	0
9	FW	CAN	Simeon Jackson	24 (14)	7	1	0	1	0	1	0	27 (14)	7	1	0
10	MF	ENG	Erhun Oztumer	34 (7)	15	1	0	1	0	2	0	38 (7)	15	2	0
11	MF	ENG	Kieron Morris	28 (7)	5	0	0	1	0	1	1	30 (7)	6	1	0
13	GK	ENG	Craig MacGillivray	5	0	0	0	0	0	4	0	9	0	0	0
14	MF	ENG	Isaiah Osbourne	27 (3)	1	0	0	0	0	2	0	29 (3)	1	6	0
15	MF	IRL	Liam Kinsella	5 (3)	0	0	0	0 (1)	0	3	0	8 (4)	0	1	0
16	DF	ENG	Matt Preston	25 (5)	1	1	0	1	0	4	0	31 (5)	1	7	0
~~18~~ †	MF	ENG	Josh Ginnelly *	4 (5)	0	1	0	1	0	2 (1)	0	8 (6)	0	0	0
18	MF	ENG	Will Randall *	0 (2)	0	0	0	0	0	0	0	0 (2)	0	0	0
20	FW	SLE	Amadou Bakayoko	18 (21)	4	0 (1)	0	0 (1)	0	4	6	22 (23)	10	6	1
21	MF	BER	Milan Butterfield	0	0	0	0	0	0	0	0	0	0	0	0
22	MF	ENG	Jordan Sangha	0	0	0	0	0	0	0 (1)	0	0 (1)	0	0	0
24	DF	ENG	Kory Roberts	4	0	0	0	0	0	0	0	4	0	1	0
25	MF	AFG	Maziar Kouhyar	2 (4)	0	0	0	0	0	1	1	3 (4)	1	0	0
27	GK	ENG	Chandler Hallwood	0	0	0	0	0	0	0	0	0	0	0	0
28	DF	IRL	Callum Cockerill-Mollett	0	0	0	0	0	0	2	0	2	0	0	0
29	MF	ENG	Will Shorrock	0	0	0	0	0	0	0 (2)	0	0 (2)	0	0	0
30	FW	ENG	Cameron Peters	0	0	0	0	0	0	0	0	0	0	0	0
31	DF	ENG	Sam Tonks	0	0	0	0	0	0	0	0	0	0	0	0
~~32~~ †	DF	IRL	Kevin Toner *	16	0	1	0	0	0	3	0	20	0	2	0
32	DF	IRL	Eoghan O'Connell *	17	1	0	0	0	0	0	0	17	1	1	1
33	FW	CYP	Andreas Makris	17 (15)	1	0 (1)	0	0 (1)	0	0 (1)	0	17 (18)	1	2	0
34	DF	ENG	Dan Vann	0	0	0	0	0	0	0	0	0	0	0	0
35	DF	ENG	Tobias Hayles-Docherty	0 (1)	0	0	0	0	0	0	0	0 (1)	0	0	0
36	FW	ENG	Mitchel Candlin	1 (4)	0	0	0	0	0	0	0	1 (4)	0	0	0
37	GK	ENG	Brandon Ganley	0	0	0	0	0	0	0	0	0	0	0	0
44	MF	BEL	Franck Moussa	14 (8)	4	1	0	0	0	2 (1)	0	17 (9)	4	2	0

Players not included in matchday squads
No.	Pos.	Nat.	Name
17	MF	ENG	Reece Flanagan
19	DF	ENG	Theo Vassell
23	GK	ENG	Liam Roberts
26	MF	ENG	Rory Oliver
