= Zeli Ismail =

Albanian-born English footballer

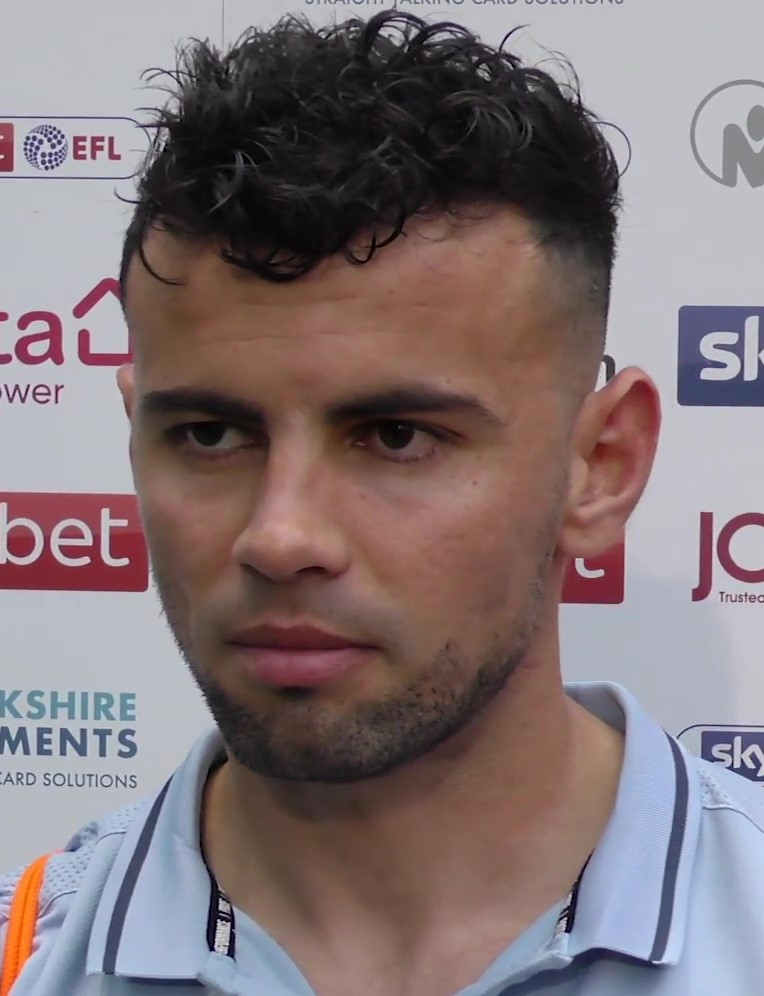
- Ismail in 2019

Personal information
- Full name: Zeli Ismail
- Date of birth: 12 December 1993 (age 32)
- Place of birth: Kukës, Albania
- Height: 5 ft 8 in (1.73 m)
- Positions: Attacking midfielder; winger

Team information
- Current team: Shifnal Town

Youth career
- 2004–2012: Wolverhampton Wanderers

Senior career*
Years	Team	Apps	(Gls)
2012–2016	Wolverhampton Wanderers	9	(0)
2012–2013	→ Milton Keynes Dons (loan)	7	(0)
2014	→ Burton Albion (loan)	15	(3)
2014	→ Notts County (loan)	14	(4)
2015–2016	→ Burton Albion (loan)	3	(0)
2016	→ Oxford United (loan)	5	(0)
2016	→ Cambridge United (loan)	11	(1)
2016–2018	Bury	37	(3)
2017–2018	→ Walsall (loan)	16	(1)
2018–2019	Walsall	32	(3)
2019–2021	Bradford City	14	(1)
2021–2022	Hereford	11	(0)
2022–2025	Newtown	60	(10)
2025–2026	Connah's Quay Nomads	19	(0)
2026–	Shifnal Town	0	(0)

International career
2008	England U16	3	(0)
2009	England U17	3	(0)
- * Club domestic league appearances and goals as of 14:34, 5 August 2026 (UTC)

Zeli Ismail (born 12 December 1993) is a professional footballer who plays as a right midfielder for Northern Premier League Division One West club Shifnal Town. Born in Albania, he has represented England at both under-16 and under-17 level.

== Career ==
Born in Kukës, Ismail is a product of Wolverhampton Wanderers' academy, which he joined at the age of 10. The midfielder signed his first professional contract in 2010, and made his senior debut on 25 September 2012 as a substitute in a 6–0 defeat at Chelsea in the League Cup under Ståle Solbakken.

In November 2012 he joined League One side Milton Keynes Dons on loan until 2 January 2013. Here, he made his league debut on 24 November 2012 as a substitute in a 5–1 win over Colchester. Upon the end of his initial loan period he was immediately re-loaned for the remainder of the campaign, but this was ended after a month as Ismail failed to establish himself in their first team.

Following Wolves' relegation to League One at the end of the 2012–13 campaign, Ismail was cited by new manager Kenny Jackett as being part of his plans for the first team. He made his first league appearance for Wolves on 10 August 2013 when he started a 4–0 win against Gillingham, in what was the first of nine league appearances.

Despite these games, Ismail did not hold down a regular place in the Wolves' team and, after not gaining any playing time at all during December 2013, he was loaned to League Two club Burton Albion in January 2014 in a one-month loan deal. He scored his first senior goal on 8 February 2014 to earn a 1–0 victory at Morecambe. His loan stay was subsequently extended until the end of the season, allowing Ismail to play in the League Two Play-off Final for the Brewers, where they lost 1–0 to Fleetwood.

In July 2014, Ismail signed a six-month loan deal with League One Notts County. He scored four times in sixteen appearances before suffering a knee injury against Accrington in November 2014 that meant he had to return to his parent club and undergo surgery.

On 29 July 2015, it was announced that Ismail would return to former club Burton Albion on loan until January. This spell was however hampered by an ankle injury. Having recovered, he joined Oxford United in February 2016 on a month's loan, during which time he made 6 substitute appearances (5 of them in League matches). Ismail was almost immediately loaned out again; this time joining another League Two side, Cambridge United, until the end of the 2015–16 season, where he made 11 appearances, scoring once against Morecambe.

At the conclusion of the campaign his parent club announced they would not be taking up the option of offering Ismail a new contract. He made 12 appearances in total for the club, but none above League One level.

On 25 June 2016 he signed for Bury. He scored his first goal for Bury in an EFL Trophy tie against Morecambe on 30 August 2016.

On 31 August 2017, Ismail joined fellow League One club Walsall on loan until January 2018. Ismail scored his first goal for Walsall in an EFL Trophy tie against West Bromwich Albion Under-23s on 19 September 2017.

He was released by Bury at the end of the 2017–18 season.

After making sixteen league appearances on loan for the club, Ismail joined Walsall permanently on 26 June 2018, signing a one-year deal.

He was released by Walsall at the end of the 2018–19 season.

In June 2019 it was announced that he would sign for Bradford City on 1 July 2019, after signing a one-year contract with the club. He made his debut for the club on 3 September 2019 in an EFL Trophy match against Bolton Wanderers and made his league debut for the club on 7 September 2019 in a 2–1 win against Northampton Town, where he was also sent off.

On 12 May 2021 he was one of nine players that Bradford City announced would leave the club on 30 June 2021 when their contracts expire. He subsequently joined National League North club Hereford.

On 31 January 2022, Ismail signed for Cymru Premier side Newtown.

In May 2025 he moved to Connah's Quay Nomads. He departed from the club in August 2026.

On 4 August 2026, Ismail joined Northern Premier League Division One West club Shifnal Town.

== Career statistics ==
As of match played 19 August 2020

Appearances and goals by club, season and competition
Club	Season	League			FA Cup		League Cup		Other		Total	
Club	Season	Division	Apps	Goals	Apps	Goals	Apps	Goals	Apps	Goals	Apps	Goals
Wolverhampton Wanderers	2012–13	Championship	0	0	0	0	1	0	—		1	0
Wolverhampton Wanderers	2013–14	League One	9	0	1	0	1	0	0	0	11	0
Wolverhampton Wanderers	2014–15	Championship	0	0	—		0	0	—		0	0
Wolverhampton Wanderers	2015–16	Championship	0	0	0	0	0	0	—		0	0
Wolverhampton Wanderers	Total		9	0	1	0	2	0	0	0	12	0
Milton Keynes Dons (loan)	2012–13	League One	7	0	2	0	—		0	0	9	0
Burton Albion (loan)	2013–14	League Two	15	3	—		—		2 (Note: Appearances in League Two play-offs)	0	17	3
Notts County (loan)	2014–15	League One	14	4	1	0	0	0	1 (Note: Appearance in Football League Trophy)	0	16	4
Burton Albion (loan)	2015–16	League One	3	0	0	0	0	0	—		3	0
Oxford United (loan)	2015–16	League Two	5	0	0	0	0	0	1	0	6	0
Cambridge United (loan)	2015–16	League Two	11	1	0	0	0	0	—		11	1
Bury	2016–17	League One	16	3	1	0	1	0	1 (Note: Appearance(s) in EFL Trophy)	1	19	4
Bury	2017–18	League One	21	0	—		1	0	—		22	0
Bury	Total		37	3	1	0	2	0	1	1	41	4
Walsall (loan)	2017–18	League One	16	1	1	0	—		3	2	20	3
Walsall	2018–19	League One	32	3	2	0	1	1	3	0	38	4
Walsall	Total		48	4	3	0	1	1	6	2	58	7
Bradford City	2019–20	League Two	11	1	0	0	0	0	1	0	12	1
Newtown	2021–22	Cymru Premier	12	0	0	0	0	0	0	0	12	0
Career total			172	16	8	0	5	1	12	3	197	20
