= Mitchel Candlin =

English footballer

Personal information
- Full name: Mitchel James Candlin
- Date of birth: 8 June 2000 (age 26)
- Place of birth: Stafford, England
- Position: Striker

Team information
- Current team: Bedworth United

Youth career
- –2017: Walsall

Senior career*
| Years | Team | Apps | (Gls) |
| 2017–2020 | Walsall | 8 | (0) |
| 2018–2019 | → Blackburn Rovers (loan) | 0 | (0) |
| 2019–2020 | → Nuneaton Borough (loan) | 8 | (2) |
| 2020 | → Alvechurch (loan) | 1 | (0) |
| 2020–2021 | Stafford Rangers | | |
| 2021 | Hyde United | 6 | (0) |
| 2021–2022 | Alvechurch | 8 | (0) |
| 2022 | Bromsgrove Sporting | 12 | (0) |
| 2022–2023 | Chasetown | 2 | (0) |
| 2023 | → Wolverhampton Casuals (loan) | | |
| 2023–2024 | Quorn | | |
| 2024 | Stafford Rangers | 1 | (0) |
| 2024– | Bedworth United | 3 | (1) |
- * Club domestic league appearances and goals as of 14:07, 10 October 2024 (UTC)

Mitchel James Candlin (born 8 June 2000) is an English professional footballer who plays as a striker for Bedworth United.

== Playing career ==
=== Walsall ===
Candlin made his Walsall debut as an 84th minute substitute for Adam Chambers in a 1–0 defeat to Bradford City at Valley Parade on 1 April 2017 and made four further appearances as a sixteen-year-old before the end of the season.

He scored his first first-team goal for Walsall in a 2–1 pre-season friendly win against Chester in July 2017. Despite a promising pre-season, Candlin managed only four further first team appearances in the 2017–18 season.

On the final day of the August transfer window in 2018, Candlin signed on loan with Blackburn Rovers with a view to making the move permanent on 1 January 2019. However, after failing to make a first-team appearance and only limited game time for the club's U23 side, Rovers opted not to complete the transfer and Candlin returned to Walsall in January 2019.

In September 2019 he joined Nuneaton Borough on a short-term loan deal. He scored his first goal for Nuneaton in a 4–0 home win against Stourbridge on 17 September and went on to make 11 appearances and score 3 goals. He was recalled by Walsall in January 2020 due to a number of injuries to first-team players.

On 2 March 2020, Candlin moved to Alvechurch on a youth loan.

He signed for Northern Premier League Premier League side Hyde United on a free transfer in September 2021. In November 2021, he signed for Southern League Premier Division Central side Alvechurch, where he had previously spent time on loan. In January 2022, he was on the move again, signing for divisional rivals Bromsgrove Sporting.

In September 2024, Candlin joined Bedworth United.

== Career statistics ==
| Club | Season | Division | League | | FA Cup | | EFL Cup | | Other | | Total | |
| Club | Season | Division | Apps | Goals | Apps | Goals | Apps | Goals | Apps | Goals | Apps | Goals |
|---|---|---|---|---|---|---|---|---|---|---|---|---|
| Walsall | 2016–17 | League One | 5 | 0 | 0 | 0 | 0 | 0 | 0 | 0 | 5 | 0 |
| Walsall | 2017–18 | League One | 3 | 0 | 0 | 0 | 0 | 0 | 1 (Note: Appearance in EFL Trophy) | 0 | 4 | 0 |
| Walsall | 2018–19 | League One | 0 | 0 | 0 | 0 | 0 | 0 | 0 | 0 | 0 | 0 |
| Walsall | 2019–20 | League Two | 0 | 0 | 0 | 0 | 0 | 0 | 0 | 0 | 0 | 0 |
| Walsall | Total | | 8 | 0 | 0 | 0 | 0 | 0 | 1 | 0 | 9 | 0 |
| Blackburn Rovers (loan) | 2018–19 | Championship | 0 | 0 | 0 | 0 | 0 | 0 | — | | 0 | 0 |
| Nuneaton Borough (loan) | 2019–20 | Southern League Premier | 8 | 2 | 0 | 0 | — | | 3 (Note: Appearances in Southern League Cup) | 1 | 11 | 3 |
| Alvechurch (loan) | 2019–20 | Southern League Premier | 1 | 0 | 0 | 0 | — | | 0 | 0 | 1 | 0 |
| Career total | | | 17 | 2 | 0 | 0 | 0 | 0 | 4 | 1 | 21 | 3 |
