= Jason McCarthy =

English footballer (born 1995)

Personal information
- Full name: Jason Sean McCarthy
- Date of birth: 7 November 1995 (age 31)
- Place of birth: Southampton, England
- Height: 6 ft 1 in (1.86 m)
- Position: Right-back

Youth career
- 2002–2014: Southampton

Senior career*
Years	Team	Apps	(Gls)
2014–2017	Southampton	1	(0)
2015–2016	→ Wycombe Wanderers (loan)	35	(2)
2016–2017	→ Walsall (loan)	46	(5)
2017–2018	Barnsley	21	(0)
2018–2019	Wycombe Wanderers	44	(2)
2019–2020	Millwall	2	(0)
2020	→ Wycombe Wanderers (loan)	9	(1)
2020–2024	Wycombe Wanderers	106	(4)
- * Club domestic league appearances and goals as of 19:58, 17 December 2024 (UTC)

Jason Sean McCarthy (born 7 November 1995) is an English former professional footballer who played as a defender.

== Club career ==
=== Southampton ===
McCarthy is a youth product of the Southampton F.C. Academy and captained the club's under-21 side. He made his professional debut and only Premier League appearance on 26 December 2014 against Crystal Palace, when he replaced Nathaniel Clyne after 87 minutes in a 3–1 away victory.

==== Wycombe Wanderers (loan) ====
In October 2015, McCarthy signed a loan deal until February with Wycombe Wanderers, with the deal later extended until the end of the season. At the end of the season, he was voted Supporters' Player of the Year.

==== Walsall (loan) ====
On 28 June 2016, McCarthy was sent out on loan to Walsall for the first half of the season. He scored his first goal for Walsall in a 1–0 win over Bolton Wanderers on 17 September 2016.

On 1 January 2017, McCarthy's loan to Walsall was extended until the end of the 2016–17 season.

At the end of the season, he was crowned the Fans Player of the Season after playing every minute of every game in the 2016–17 season for the Saddlers.

=== Barnsley ===
On 13 June 2017, he joined Barnsley for an undisclosed fee on a three-year deal.

=== Wycombe Wanderers ===
On 9 August 2018, McCarthy returned to Wycombe Wanderers where he had previously been on loan, signing for an undisclosed fee on a three-year deal. McCarthy won the Supporters' Player of the Year Award for the 2018–19 season.

=== Millwall ===
On 30 July 2019, he was transferred to Millwall for an undisclosed fee on a three-year deal.

==== Wycombe Wanderers (second loan) ====
On 18 January 2020, McCarthy once again rejoined Wycombe Wanderers on loan until the end of the 2019–20 season.

=== Wycombe Wanderers (second permanent spell) ===
On 25 August 2020, McCarthy rejoined Wycombe Wanderers for a fourth time, signing a three-year contract for an undisclosed fee.

On 17 December 2024, McCarthy departed the club by mutual consent.

== Coaching career ==
In January 2025, following his retirement from professional football, McCarthy joined the Under-21s coaching staff at Premier League club Brighton & Hove Albion as assistant to Head Coach Shannon Ruth.

== Personal life ==
McCarthy is a Christian.

== Career statistics ==
As of 17 December 2024

Appearances and goals by club, season and competition
Club	Season	League			FA Cup		League Cup		Other		Total	
Club	Season	Division	Apps	Goals	Apps	Goals	Apps	Goals	Apps	Goals	Apps	Goals
Southampton	2014–15	Premier League	1	0	0	0	0	0	0	0	1	0
Wycombe Wanderers (loan)	2015–16	League Two	35	2	4	0	0	0	0	0	39	2
Walsall (loan)	2016–17	League One	46	5	1	0	1	0	4	0	52	5
Barnsley	2017–18	Championship	21	0	1	0	2	0	0	0	24	0
Wycombe Wanderers	2018–19	League One	44	2	1	0	3	0	1	0	49	2
Millwall	2019–20	Championship	2	0	1	0	2	0	0	0	5	0
Wycombe Wanderers (loan)	2019–20	League One	9	1	0	0	0	0	0	0	9	1
Wycombe Wanderers	2020–21	Championship	24	2	2	0	0	0	0	0	26	2
Wycombe Wanderers	2021–22	League One	34	1	2	0	2	0	1	0	39	1
Wycombe Wanderers	2022–23	League One	36	1	1	0	1	0	1	0	39	1
Wycombe Wanderers	2023–24	League One	10	0	0	0	0	0	1	0	11	0
Wycombe Wanderers	2024–25	League One	2	0	1	0	1	0	3	0	7	0
Wycombe Wanderers		Total	106	4	6	0	4	0	6	0	121	4
Career total			264	14	14	0	12	0	11	0	301	14

== Honours ==
Southampton

- U21 Premier League Cup: 2014–15

Wycombe Wanderers

- EFL Trophy runner-up: 2023–24

Individual

- Walsall Player of the Year: 2016–17
