= Dylan Parker =

English footballer (born 1999)

Personal information
- Date of birth: 11 October 1999 (age 27)
- Position: Striker

Team information
- Current team: Rugby Town

Youth career
- Stratford Town
- 2017–2018: Walsall

Senior career*
Years	Team	Apps	(Gls)
2018–2019	Walsall	0	(0)
2019	→ Rushall Olympic (loan)		
2019	→ Leamington (loan)		
2019	Stratford Town		
2019–	Rugby Town		
- * Club domestic league appearances and goals as of 19:29, 19 July 2021 (UTC)

Dylan Parker (born 11 October 1999) is an English professional footballer who plays for Rugby Town as a striker.

== Career ==
Parker joined Stratford Town at the age of five. He moved to Walsall in October 2017, turning professional in July 2018. He made his senior debut on 28 August 2018 in the EFL Cup. After a further two EFL Trophy cup appearances, he moved on loan to Rushall Olympic on 1 January 2019. He made his debut for Rushall the next day, and "put in an impressive display". He moved on loan to Leamington in March 2019. After leaving Walsall, he returned to Stratford Town, before moving to Rugby Town in September 2019.
