= Reece Flanagan =

English footballer (born 1994)

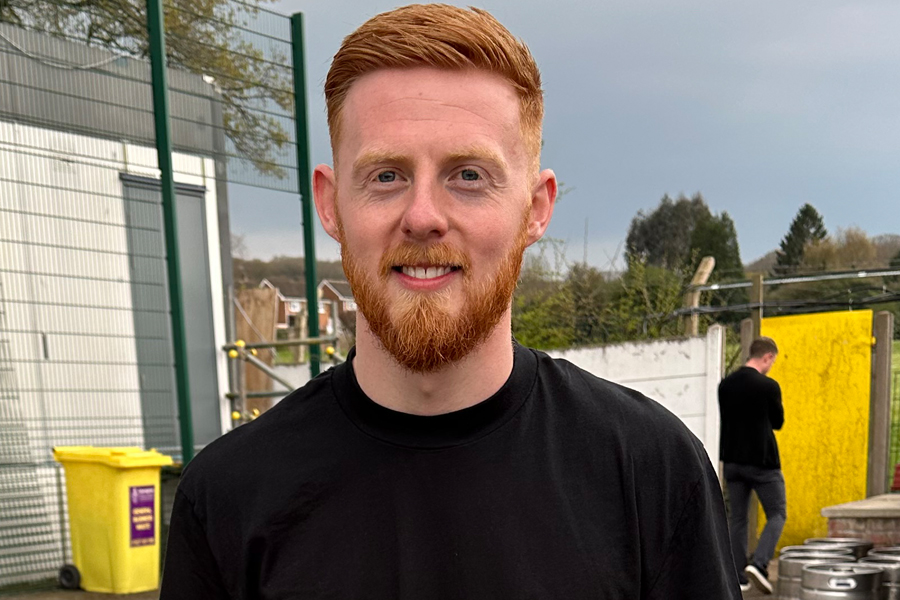
- Flanagan with Redditch United in April 2023

Personal information
- Full name: Reece James Flanagan
- Date of birth: 19 October 1994 (age 32)
- Place of birth: Birmingham, England
- Height: 1.80 m (5 ft 11 in)
- Position: Midfielder

Team information
- Current team: Redditch United

Youth career
- –2013: Walsall

Senior career*
Years	Team	Apps	(Gls)
2013–2018	Walsall	39	(0)
2014	→ Leamington (loan)	8	(2)
2018–2019	Leamington	31	(1)
2019–2020	Rushall Olympic	4	(0)
2020	Stratford Town	9	(1)
2020–2022	Hednesford Town	40	(9)
2022–2024	Redditch United	73	(26)
2024–2025	Halesown Town	17	(1)
2025–	Redditch United	0	(0)
- * Club domestic league appearances and goals as of 18:50, 23 June 2025 (UTC)

Reece James Flanagan (born 19 October 1994) is an English footballer who plays as a midfielder for Southern League Premier Division Central club Redditch United.

== Playing career ==
=== Walsall ===
Flanagan scored his first goal for Walsall in an EFL Trophy tie against West Bromwich Albion Under-23s on 19 September 2017.

He was released by Walsall at the end of the 2017–18 season.

On 17 and 18 July 2018, Flanagan played for Grimsby Town on trial in their pre-season game with Sunderland and their Lincolnshire Senior Cup game with Cleethorpes Town.

=== Non League ===
On 15 October 2019, Flanagan signed for Rushall Olympic.

It was confirmed on 11 January 2020, that Reece had signed for fellow Southern League Premier Division Central side Stratford Town.

On 16 October 2020, he signed for fellow Southern League Premier Division side Hednesford Town on a free transfer.

On 2 June 2022, he was on the move again to join fellow Southern League Premier Division Central side Redditch United, joining his brother Calum who also joined the club months earlier in January. Matt Clarke, Redditch manager at the time, described it as "a huge signing for the club".

In June 2025, Flanagan returned to Redditch United following a season with Halesowen Town.

== Career statistics ==
As of end of 2024–25 season

Appearances and goals by club, season and competition
Club	Season	League			FA Cup		League Cup		Other		Total	
Club	Season	Division	Apps	Goals	Apps	Goals	Apps	Goals	Apps	Goals	Apps	Goals
Walsall	2013–14	League One	0	0	0	0	0	0	0	0	0	0
Walsall	2014–15	League One	16	0	0	0	1	0	1 (Note: Appearance in Football League Trophy)	0	18	0
Walsall	2015–16	League One	14	0	0	0	3	0	0	0	17	0
Walsall	2016–17	League One	0	0	0	0	0	0	0	0	0	0
Walsall	2017–18	League One	9	0	0	0	0	0	4 (Note: Appearances in EFL Trophy)	1	13	1
Walsall	Total		39	0	0	0	4	0	5	1	48	1
Leamington (loan)	2013–14	Conference North	8	2	—		—		—		8	2
Leamington	2018–19	National League North	30	1	—		—		2 (Note: Appearances in FA Trophy)	0	32	1
Leamington	2019–20	National League North	1	0	0	0	—		—		1	0
Leamington	Total		39	3	0	0	—		2	0	41	3
Rushall Olympic	2019–20	SL Premier Division Central	4	0	—		—		1	1	5	1
Stratford Town	2019–20	SL Premier Division Central	7	1	—		—		—		7	1
Stratford Town	2020–21	SL Premier Division Central	2	0	0	0	—		—		2	0
Stratford Town	Total		9	1	0	0	—		—		9	1
Hednesford Town	2020–21	SL Premier Division Central	3	0	—		—		2	0	5	0
Hednesford Town	2021–22	SL Premier Division Central	37	9	0	0	—		4 (Note: One appearance and one goal in FA Trophy, one in Southern League Cup, one in Birmingham Senior Cup, one in Staffordshire Senior Cup)	1	41	10
Hednesford Town	Total		40	9	0	0	—		6	1	46	10
Redditch United	2022–23	SL Premier Division Central	38	9	3	0	—		8 (Note: Three appearances and one goal in FA Trophy, three appearances and three goals in Birmingham Senior Cup, two appearances in Worcestershire Senior Cup)	4	49	13
Redditch United	2023–24	SL Premier Division Central	35	17	3	3	—		6 (Note: Four appearances and two goals in FA Trophy, one appearance in Birmingham Senior Cup, one appearance and one goal in Worcestershire Senior Cup)	3	44	23
Redditch United	Total		73	26	6	3	0	0	14	7	93	36
Halesowen Town	2024–25	SL Premier Division Central	17	1	0	0	—		1 (Note: Appearance(s) in Southern League Premier Division Central play-offs)	0	18	1
Career total			221	40	6	3	4	0	29	10	260	53

== Honours ==
Walsall

- Football League Trophy runner-up: 2014–15
