= Will Shorrock =

English association football player

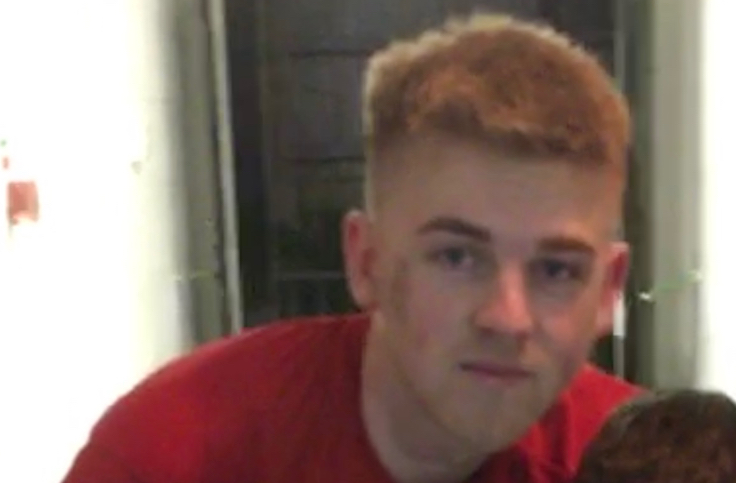
- Shorrock in January 2020

Personal information
- Full name: William John Shorrock
- Date of birth: 30 January 1999 (age 27)
- Place of birth: Stockport, England
- Height: 1.68 m (5 ft 6 in)
- Position: Midfielder

Team information
- Current team: Leamington

Youth career
- –2016: Walsall

Senior career*
Years	Team	Apps	(Gls)
2016–2018	Walsall	3	(0)
2018–2022	Bromsgrove Sporting	67	(20)
2022–2023	Rushall Olympic	35	(14)
2023–	Leamington	20	(4)
- * Club domestic league appearances and goals as of 13:17, 20 October 2023 (UTC)

William John Shorrock (born 30 January 1999) is an English footballer who plays for Southern League Premier Division Central side Leamington, where he plays as a midfielder.

== Playing career ==
=== Walsall ===
Shorrock made his first-team debut for Walsall as a 74th-minute substitute for Josh Ginnelly in a 2–1 victory over Sheffield United in an EFL Trophy group stage game at Bramall Lane on 4 October 2016.

He was released by Walsall at the end of the 2017–18 season.

=== Bromsgrove Sporting ===
On 25 July 2018, Shorrock joined up with Southern League Division One Central side Bromsgrove Sporting for pre-season. It was confirmed on 15 August 2018, that following some impressive displays in a pre-season game against Alvechurch, capped by goals against Stourbridge and Evesham United, Shorrock had signed for the club on a one-year deal.

Shorrock was named in the Bromsgrove Sporting retained list in preparation for the 2020–21 Southern League Premier Central season on 7 July 2020.

=== Rushall Olympic ===
On 3 June 2022, it was confirmed that Shorrock had signed for fellow Southern League Premier Central side Rushall Olympic for the 2022–23 season. The season ended in success for Shorrock and the Pics as they were promoted to the National League North for the first time in the club's history.

=== Leamington ===
In October 2023, Shorrock returned to the Southern League Premier Central with Leamington.

== Career statistics ==
As of match played 30 September 2023

Appearances and goals by club, season and competition
Club	Season	League			FA Cup		League Cup		Other		Total	
Club	Season	Division	Apps	Goals	Apps	Goals	Apps	Goals	Apps	Goals	Apps	Goals
Walsall	2016–17	League One	0	0	0	0	0	0	2 (Note: Appearance(s) in the EFL Trophy)	0	2	0
Walsall	2017–18	League One	1	0	0	0	0	0	1	0	2	0
Walsall	Walsall		1	0	0	0	0	0	3	0	4	0
Bromsgrove Sporting	2018–19	Southern League Division One Central	19	4	1	0	—		6 (Note: One appearance in FA Trophy, one appearance in Southern League Cup, two appearances and two goals in Worcestershire Senior Cup, two appearances in Southern League play-offs)	2	26	6
Bromsgrove Sporting	2019–20	Southern League Premier Division Central	28	5	2	0	—		5 (Note: One appearance in FA Trophy, two appearances in Southern League Cup, two appearances and one goal in Worcestershire Senior Cup)	1	35	6
Bromsgrove Sporting	2020–21	Southern League Premier Division Central	0	0	0	0	—		0	0	0	0
Bromsgrove Sporting	2021–22	Southern League Premier Division Central	29	4	4	1	—		4 (Note: One appearance in FA Trophy, two appearances in Southern League Cup, one appearance in Worcestershire Senior Cup)	0	37	5
Bromsgrove Sporting	Total		76	13	8	1	—		15	3	99	17
Rushall Olympic	2022–23	Southern League Premier Division Central	32	12	0	—		5 (Note: One appearance, one goal in FA Trophy, two appearances, one goal in Worcestershire Senior Cup, one appearance in Southern League Cup and one appearance in Southern League Premier Division Central play-offs)	2	38	8	
Rushall Olympic	2023–24	National League North	2	0	1	0	—		0	0	3	0
Rushall Olympic	Total		34	6	2	0	0	0	5	2	41	8
Career total			125	38	10	1	0	0	23	5	144	25
