= Erhun Oztumer =

English footballer (born 1991)

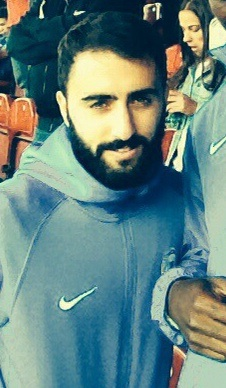
- Oztumer in 2014

Personal information
- Full name: Erhun Aksel Oztumer
- Date of birth: 29 May 1991 (age 35)
- Place of birth: Greenwich, England
- Height: 5 ft 3 in (1.60 m)
- Position: Midfielder

Team information
- Current team: Mağusa Türk Gücü

Youth career
- 1999–2007: Charlton Athletic
- 2007–2008: Fisher Athletic
- 2008–2009: Manisaspor

Senior career*
Years	Team	Apps	(Gls)
2009–2011	Sivasspor	0	(0)
2011–2012	Anadolu Üsküdar	34	(5)
2012–2014	Dulwich Hamlet	78	(49)
2014–2016	Peterborough United	50	(7)
2016–2018	Walsall	86	(30)
2018–2019	Bolton Wanderers	18	(0)
2019–2021	Charlton Athletic	16	(0)
2020–2021	→ Bristol Rovers (loan)	22	(0)
2021–2022	Fatih Karagümrük	18	(0)
2022–2023	Adana Demirspor	11	(1)
2023–	Mağusa Türk Gücü	30	(13)

International career
2026–	Northern Cyprus	3	(4)
- * Club domestic league appearances and goals as of 20:13, 31 August 2024 (UTC)

Erhun Aksel Oztumer (born 29 May 1991) is an English professional footballer who plays as a midfielder for Mağusa Türk Gücü.

== Club career ==
=== Early career and Turkey ===
Following nine years in the youth set up at Charlton Athletic, and a season with Fisher Athletic, 16-year-old Oztumer joined Manisaspor in 2008, who at the time were in the Turkish Süper Lig. Despite featuring mainly for the Manisaspor youth team, in 2009 he earned a move to Sivasspor, also of the Turkish Süper Lig, where he signed his first professional contract. Oztumer never played for the first team at Sivasspor, but played 29 times for the reserve team in A2 Ligi, scoring eight goals. In 2011, Oztumer left Sivasspor to join Anadolu Üsküdar in the TFF Third League, the fourth tier of Turkish football, where he played senior football for the first time, playing 34 league games in 16 months, scoring five goals.

=== Dulwich Hamlet ===
Before the start of the 2012–13 season, Oztumer returned to England, joining Isthmian League side Dulwich Hamlet. He went on to score over 60 goals from midfield in all competitions over two seasons, during which time Dulwich won promotion to the Isthmian League Premier Division.

=== Peterborough United ===
In June 2014, he moved back into the professional game, joining Peterborough United for an undisclosed fee, leaving with the best wishes of Dulwich Hamlet manager Gavin Rose.

He played one friendly in pre-season, scoring a free kick against St Neots Town, before suffering an injury which kept him out of the early part of the 2014–15 season. He made his Peterborough debut as a substitute in a 2–2 draw with Oldham Athletic on 4 October 2014. He made his first start for the club on 13 December 2014, scoring the winning goal away to Leyton Orient.

=== Walsall ===
On 17 June 2016, Oztumer signed for Football League One side Walsall on a two-year contract upon the expiry of his contract at Peterborough. He scored on his debut in a 3–1 win over AFC Wimbledon on 6 August 2016.

At the end of the 2017–18 season he announced his decision to leave Walsall due to his contract expiring.

=== Bolton Wanderers ===
On 13 June 2018, Oztumer signed for EFL Championship team Bolton Wanderers on a two-year deal. He scored on his debut, in a 1–2 defeat to Leeds United in the EFL Cup on 14 August. On 15 August 2019 he left the club after handing in his notice due to the club's ongoing financial problems.

=== Charlton Athletic ===
On 16 August 2019, Oztumer was announced as a free signing for Charlton Athletic on a two-year deal. He scored his first goal for Charlton in an EFL Trophy tie against AFC Wimbledon on 1 September 2020.

On 18 May 2021, it was announced that Oztumer would leave Charlton Athletic at the end of his contract.

==== Bristol Rovers (loan) ====
On 15 October 2020, Oztumter joined Bristol Rovers on a season-long loan. The following day Oztumer came off the bench in the 83 minute of a 1-1 draw with Burton Albion to make his debut. He made his full debut on 7 November against former club Walsall in an FA Cup victory. He scored his first goal with the fourth in a 6–0 thrashing of Darlington in the second round of the FA Cup. In December 2020, it was reported that Oztumer had tested positive for COVID-19 along with teammate Zain Westbrooke.

=== Fatih Karagümrük ===
On 1 July 2021, Oztumer moved to Turkey to join Süper Lig side Fatih Karagümrük.

=== Adana Demirspor ===
On 27 January 2022, Oztumer joined Adana Demirspor on a contract until June 2023 with the option for a further year.

=== Mağusa Türk Gücü ===
In July 2023, Oztumer signed for Mağusa Türk Gücü, reigning champions of the top division of Northern Cyprus.

== International career ==
In June 2026, Oztumer represented Northern Cyprus at the 2026 CONIFA European Football Cup. On 6 June 2026, Oztumer scored four goals in a 22 minute period as Northern Cyprus beat Padania 6–1 in the final.

== Personal life ==
Oztumer is of Turkish Cypriot descent.

== Career statistics ==
As of end of 2023-24 season

Appearances and goals by club, season and competition
Club	Season	League			National cup (Note: Includes FA Cup, Turkish Cup)		League cup (Note: Includes EFL Cup)		Other		Total	
Club	Season	Division	Apps	Goals	Apps	Goals	Apps	Goals	Apps	Goals	Apps	Goals
Üsküdar Anadolu S.K.	2010–11	TFF Third League	9	4			—				9	4
Üsküdar Anadolu S.K.	2011–12	TFF Third League	25	1			—				25	1
Üsküdar Anadolu S.K.	Total		34	5			—				34	5
Dulwich Hamlet	2012–13	Isthmian League Division One South	36	21	3	1	—		8 (Note: One appearance in FA Trophy, six appearances and three goals in Isthmian League Cup, one appearance and two goals in London Senior Cup)	5	47	27
Dulwich Hamlet	2013–14	Isthmian League Premier Division	42	28	3	3	—		4 (Note: Appearances in FA Trophy)	2	49	33
Dulwich Hamlet	Total		78	49	6	4	—		12	7	96	60
Peterborough United	2014–15	League One	20	1	2	0	0	0	0	0	22	1
Peterborough United	2015–16	League One	30	6	5	0	0	0	0	0	35	6
Peterborough United	Total		50	7	7	0	0	0	0	0	57	7
Walsall	2016–17	League One	41	15	1	0	1	0	2 (Note: Appearances in EFL Trophy)	0	45	15
Walsall	2017–18	League One	45	15	1	0	1	1	3	1	50	17
Walsall	Total		86	30	2	0	2	1	5	1	95	32
Bolton Wanderers	2018–19	Championship	17	0	0	0	1	1	—		18	1
Bolton Wanderers	2019–20	League One	1	0	0	0	0	0	0	0	1	0
Bolton Wanderers	Total		18	0	0	0	1	1	0	0	19	1
Charlton Athletic	2019–20	Championship	14	0	0	0	0	0	—		14	0
Charlton Athletic	2020–21	League One	2	0	0	0	2	0	1	1	5	1
Charlton Athletic	Total		16	0	0	0	2	0	1	1	19	1
Bristol Rovers (loan)	2020–21	League One	22	0	3	1	0	0	0	0	25	1
Fatih Karagümrük	2021–22	Süper Lig	18	0	2	0	—		—		20	0
Adana Demirspor	2021–22	Süper Lig	7	1	1	1	—		—		8	2
Adana Demirspor	2022–23	Süper Lig	4	0	3	3	—		—		7	3
Adana Demirspor	Total		11	1	4	4	0	0	0	0	15	5
Mağusa Türk Gücü	2023–24	KTFF Süper Lig	30	13	7	3	—		1 (Note: Appearance in KTFF Super Cup)	0	38	16
Career total			363	105	31	12	5	2	19	9	418	128

== Honours ==
Individual

- PFA Team of the Year: 2016–17 League One, 2017–18 League One
