= Maziar Kouhyar =

Afghan footballer (born 1997)

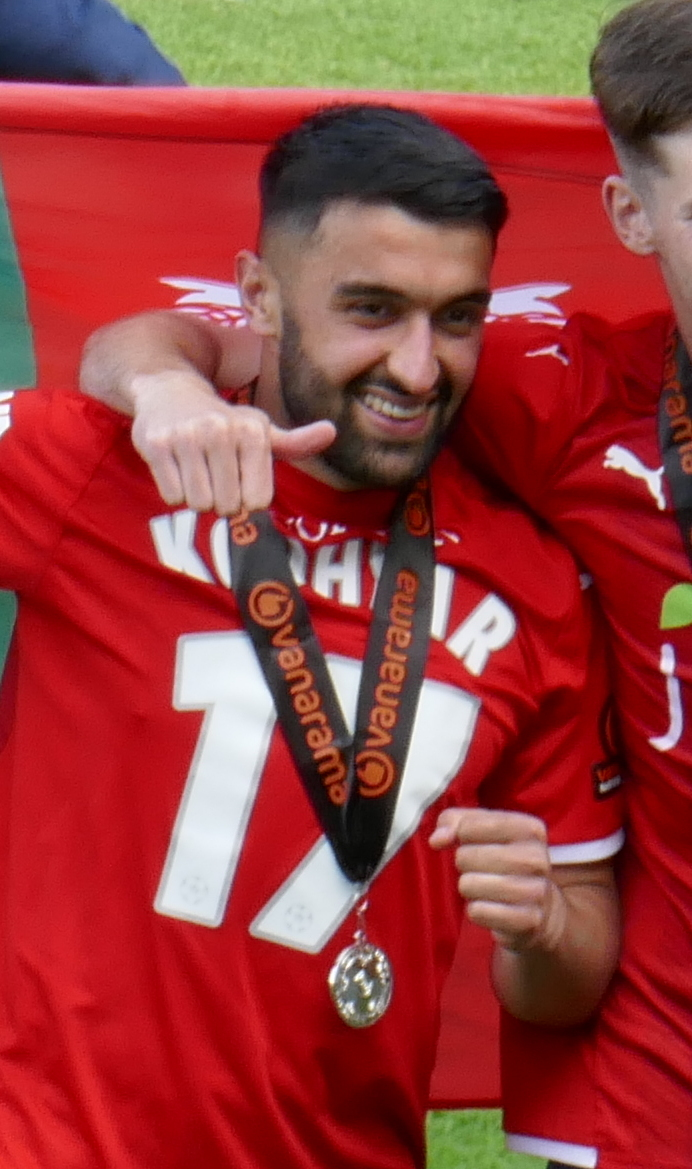
- Kouhyar with York City in 2022

Personal information
- Full name: Qamaruddin Maziar Kouhyar
- Date of birth: 30 September 1997 (age 29)
- Place of birth: Badakhshan Province, Afghanistan
- Height: 1.80 m (5 ft 11 in)
- Position: Right midfielder

Team information
- Current team: Notts County
- Number: 17

Youth career
- 2008–2013: Coventry City
- 2013–2016: Walsall

Senior career*
Years	Team	Apps	(Gls)
2016–2019	Walsall	21	(1)
2021–2022	Hereford	25	(4)
2022–2025	York City	66	(7)
2024	→ Hereford (loan)	5	(0)
2024–2025	→ Kidderminster Harriers (loan)	39	(12)
2025–	Notts County	34	(0)

International career^{‡}
2017–	Afghanistan	12	(0)
- * Club domestic league appearances and goals as of 06:58, 13 August 2025 (UTC) ‡ National team caps and goals as of 14:41, 16 July 2024 (UTC)

Qamaruddin Maziar Kouhyar (Dari: مازیار كوهيار; born 30 September 1997) is an Afghan professional footballer who plays as a right midfielder for EFL League One club Notts County, and the Afghanistan national team. He is the first Afghan to play professionally in Great Britain.

== Club career ==
Born in Badakhshan Province in Afghanistan, Kouhyar moved to England as a two-year-old due to conflict in his home country. His parents settled in Handsworth suburb of Birmingham and his father worked as a pizza delivery driver, before returning to Afghanistan to work as an interpreter, leaving his mother to bring up the four children. At the age of eleven he was spotted by a Coventry City scout after attending a Saturday football session with his cousin, and joined the club's youth system.

=== Walsall ===
After being released from Coventry at the age of sixteen, he played in Sunday league football, before being spotted by a Walsall scout whilst playing in a local Powerleague. After a trial, he subsequently joined the club. He went on to sign a two-year scholarship with the club, progressing to sign his first professional deal in February 2016, on a one-year contract with the option of a further year. He made his professional debut in August 2016, in a 2–0 defeat to Chesterfield, replacing Kieron Morris as a substitute. He scored his first goal for Walsall in an EFL Trophy tie against Grimsby Town on 30 August 2016. On 9 December 2016 he signed a new contract with Walsall until the summer of 2019.

He left Walsall due to a knee injury, and began working in a fried chicken shop.

In a November 2020 interview following his departure from the club, Kouhyar spoke out against abuse he had received during his time with the club in which he had been labelled a "terrorist" by a teammate.

=== Hereford ===
In March 2021, Kouhyar signed for National League North club Hereford having been away from football for eighteen months with an ACL injury. Despite the early cancellation of the season, Kouhyar was part of the Hereford team that made it to the 2021 FA Trophy final, defeated 3–1 by league below Hornchurch.

After scoring three goals and registering an assist as his team pushed for the play-offs, Kouhyar was awarded the National League North Player of the Month award for February 2022. This award came after reported interest from Football League scouts.

=== York City ===
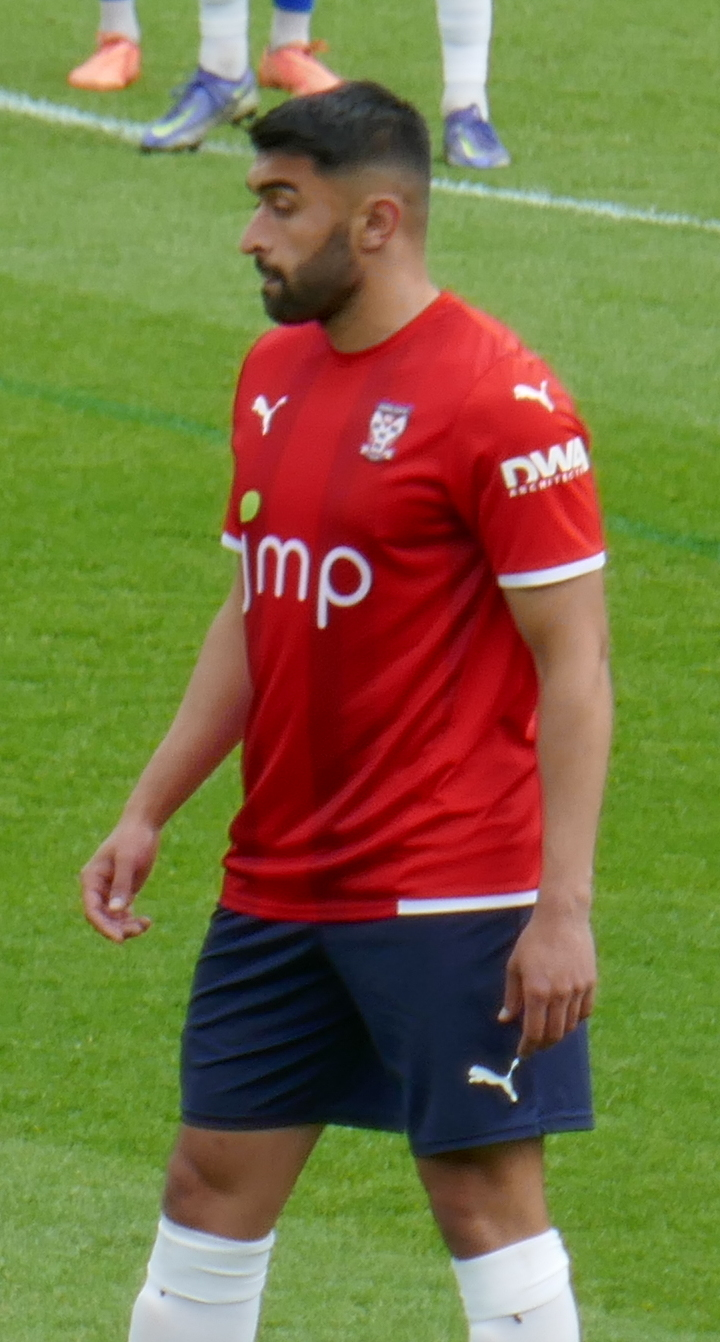
Kouhyar playing for York City in 2022

On 22 March 2022, Kouhyar signed for National League North club York City on a free transfer. On 15 April, Kouhyar scored his first goal for York in a 1–0 National League North victory over Spennymoor Town. The season ended in success for Kouhyar and York as they secured promotion to the National League through the play-offs, Kouhyar scoring the second goal in a 2–0 final victory over Boston United.

On 23 January 2024, Kouhyar joined former club Hereford on a one-month loan.

In July 2024, Kouhyar joined National League North club Kidderminster Harriers on a season-long loan. He was released by York at the end of the 2024–25 season.

=== Notts County ===
On 16 June 2025, Kouhyar agreed to join League Two side Notts County on an initial one-year deal with the option for a further year.

== International career ==
In October 2016, he received his first call-up to the Afghanistan national team for the friendly against Malaysia. While he was on international duty with the national team, he picked up an injury which cost him three months without playtime and required knee surgery. Kouhyar made his formal debut for Afghanistan in a friendly 2–0 loss to Oman on 30 August 2017. In 2018 he rejected a call-up for a home match against Palestine as his family did not want him to travel to Kabul.

Kouhyar scored for Afghanistan U23 in March 2022, scoring the first goal in an eventual 3–0 friendly victory over Kuwait Under-23.

== Personal life ==
Outside of football, Kouhyar attends an accountancy evening course.

== Career statistics ==
=== Club ===
As of match played 12 August 2025

Appearances and goals by club, season and competition
Club	Season	League			FA Cup		EFL Cup		Other		Total	
Club	Season	Division	Apps	Goals	Apps	Goals	Apps	Goals	Apps	Goals	Apps	Goals
Walsall	2015–16	League One	0	0	0	0	0	0	0	0	0	0
Walsall	2016–17	League One	6	0	0	0	0	0	1 (Note: Appearance(s) in EFL Trophy)	1	7	1
Walsall	2017–18	League One	15	1	1	0	1	0	4	0	21	1
Walsall	2018–19	League One	0	0	1	0	1	0	3	1	5	1
Walsall	Total		21	1	2	0	2	0	8	2	33	3
Hereford	2020–21	National League North	— (Note: League season was declared null and void before Kouhyar joined Hereford)		—		—		2 (Note: Appearance(s) in FA Trophy)	0	2	0
Hereford	2021–22	National League North	25	4	4	1	—		1	0	30	5
Hereford	Total		25	4	4	1	—		3	0	32	5
York City	2021–22	National League North	10	1	—		—		3 (Note: Appearance(s) in National League North play-offs)	1	13	2
York City	2022–23	National League	31	1	2	0	—		0	0	33	1
York City	2023–24	National League	25	5	1	0	—		1	0	27	5
York City	Total		66	7	3	0	—		4	1	73	8
Hereford (loan)	2023–24	National League North	5	0	—		—		—		5	0
Kidderminster Harriers (loan)	2024–25	National League North	39	12	3	0	—		3	1	45	13
Notts County	2025–26	League Two	34	0	1	0	1	0	5	0	2	0
Career total			190	24	13	1	3	0	23	4	229	29

=== International ===
As of match played 10 June 2025

Appearances and goals by national team and year
National team	Year	Apps	Goals
Afghanistan	2017	1	0
Afghanistan	2018	3	0
Afghanistan	2019	2	0
Afghanistan	2020	0	0
Afghanistan	2021	1	0
Afghanistan	2022	4	0
Afghanistan	2025	1	0
Total		12	0

== Honours ==
Hereford

- FA Trophy runner-up: 2020–21

York City

- National League North play-offs: 2022

Notts County

- EFL League Two play-offs: 2026

Individual

- National League North Player of the Month: February 2022
