= Milan Butterfield =

Bermudian footballer (born 1998)

Personal information
- Full name: Kacy Milan Butterfield
- Date of birth: 24 January 1998 (age 28)
- Place of birth: Hamilton, Bermuda
- Height: 1.93 m (6 ft 4 in)
- Position: Midfielder

Team information
- Current team: Halesowen Town (on loan from Basford United)

Youth career
- Robin Hood

Senior career*
Years	Team	Apps	(Gls)
2016–2018	Walsall	0	(0)
2017	→ Leamington (loan)	5	(0)
2017–2018	→ Rushall (loan)	14	(0)
2018–2020	Kidderminster Harriers	46	(3)
2020–2021	Chesterfield	7	(0)
2020	→ Guiseley (loan)	2	(0)
2021–2023	Alfreton Town	27	(0)
2023–2024	Nuneaton Borough	18	(1)
2024	Stourbridge	15	(0)
2024–	Basford United	25	(0)
2025–	→ Halesowen Town (loan)	1	(0)

International career^{‡}
- Bermuda U17
2017–2019	Bermuda U20	3	(0)
2019–	Bermuda	6	(0)
- * Club domestic league appearances and goals as of 18:44, 15 January 2025 (UTC) ‡ National team caps and goals as of 21 June 2019

Kacy Milan Butterfield (born 24 January 1998) is a Bermudian professional footballer who plays for Halesowen Town on loan from Northern Premier League Division One Midlands club Basford United. Butterfield also plays for the Bermuda national football team.

A youth product of the Bermudian club Robin Hood, Butterfield signed a 1-year contract with Walsall on 14 June 2016. He spent his stint with Walsall on loan to Leamington Spa and Rushall. Butterfield signed his first professional contract on 13 February 2019 with Kidderminster Harriers.

On 19 August 2020, Butterfield signed for Chesterfield from Kidderminster Harriers On 12 December 2020, he joined National League North side Guiseley on loan for a month. Butterfield returned to Chesterfield on 19 January 2021. Butterfield was released at the end of the 2020–21 season.

In June 2023, Butterfield joined Nuneaton Borough. In January 2024, he joined Stourbridge.

In May 2024, Butterfield signed for Northern Premier League Premier Division side Basford United. In January 2025, he joined Halesowen Town on loan for the remainder of the season.

== International career ==
Butterfield made his senior debut with the Bermuda national football team in a 2–2 friendly tie with Cuba on 22 February 2019.
