= 2019–20 Walsall F.C. season =

Walsall
2019–20 season
- Chairman: Leigh Pomlett
- Manager: Darrell Clarke
- Stadium: Bescot Stadium
- League Two: 12th
- FA Cup: Second round
- EFL Cup: First round
- EFL Trophy: Third round
- Top goalscorer: League: Josh Gordon (9); All: Josh Gordon (12)
Home colours	Away colours	Third colours

The 2019–20 season was Walsall's 132nd season in their existence and first back in League Two following the club's relegation in the 2018-19 season. Along with competing in League Two, the club participated in the FA Cup, League Cup and EFL Trophy.

The season covers the period from 1 July 2019 indefinitely due to the COVID-19 pandemic.

== Pre-season ==
The Saddlers announced pre-season fixtures against Alfreton Town, Leamington, Nuneaton Borough, Notts County, Aston Villa and Tranmere Rovers.

6 July 2019 Friendly	Alfreton Town	2–1	Walsall	Alfreton
15:00 BST	Clackstone 39'; Brough 88'	Report	Adebayo 6'	Stadium: North Street

9 July 2019 Friendly	Leamington	1–1	Walsall	Leamington Spa
19:45 BST	Bishop 64'	Report	Trialist 76'	Stadium: New Windmill Ground

13 July 2019 Friendly	Nuneaton Borough	1–4	Walsall	Nuneaton
15:00 BST	Benbow 54'	Report	Kinsella 22'; Trialist 48'; Adebayo 66'; Kiersey 86'	Stadium: Liberty Way

20 July 2019 Friendly	Notts County	2–1	Walsall	Nottingham
15:00 BST	Boldewijn 66', 84'	Report	Scarr 40'	Stadium: Meadow Lane

24 July 2019 Friendly	Walsall	1–5	Aston Villa	Bescot
19:45 BST	Sinclair 26'	Report	Guilbert 7'; Wesley 9', 25' (pen.); Jota 42'; Grealish 59'	Stadium: Bescot Stadium; Attendance: 8,400

27 July 2019 Friendly	Tranmere Rovers	0–0	Walsall	Birkenhead
15:00 BST		Report		Stadium: Prenton Park

== Competitions ==
=== League Two ===
==== League table ====
Pos	Team	Pld	W	D	L	GF	GA	GD	Pts	PPG
8	Port Vale	37	14	15	8	50	44	+6	57	1.54
9	Bradford City	37	14	12	11	44	40	+4	54	1.46
10	Forest Green Rovers	36	13	10	13	43	40	+3	49	1.36
11	Salford City	37	13	11	13	49	46	+3	50	1.35
12	Walsall	36	13	8	15	40	49	−9	47	1.31
13	Crawley Town	37	11	15	11	51	47	+4	48	1.30
14	Newport County	36	12	10	14	32	39	−7	46	1.28
15	Grimsby Town	37	12	11	14	45	51	−6	47	1.27
16	Cambridge United	37	12	9	16	40	48	−8	45	1.22

Source: EFL Official Website
Rules for classification: 1) Points per game; 2) Goal difference; 3) Number of goals scored; 4) Head-to-head results; 5) Wins; 6) Away goals; 7) Penalty points (sec 9.5); 8) 12-point sending off offences

==== Results summary ====
Overall								Home						Away					
Pld	W	D	L	GF	GA	GD	Pts	W	D	L	GF	GA	GD	W	D	L	GF	GA	GD
36	13	8	15	40	49	−9	47	6	5	8	21	26	−5	7	3	7	19	23	−4

Last updated: 7 March 2020.
Source: BBC

==== Results by matchday ====
Matchday	1	2	3	4	5	6	7	8	9	10	11	12	13	14	15	16	17	18	19	20	21	22	23	24	25	26	27	28	29	30	31	32	33	34	35	36
Ground	A	H	A	H	A	H	A	H	A	H	A	H	A	H	A	H	A	H	H	A	H	A	A	H	H	A	A	H	A	H	H	A	A	H	H	H
Result	W	D	L	D	L	L	D	L	W	W	W	L	L	L	L	L	L	W	D	W	D	D	W	L	W	W	L	W	L	L	L	W	D	W	D	W
Position	9	6	15	16	19	21	21	21	20	16	14	15	19	19	19	21	22	21	22	17	17	16	15	16	15	11	12	12	13	14	15	14	15	13	14	15

Updated to match(es) played on 7 March 2020. Source: Statto.com
A = Away; H = Home; W = Win; D = Draw; L = Loss

==== Matches ====
On Thursday, 20 June 2019, the EFL League Two fixtures were revealed.

3 August 2019 1	Northampton Town	0–1	Walsall	Sixfields
15:00 BST	McCormack (yellow card) 56'; Hall-Johnson (yellow card) 67'	Report	Clarke 13'; Adebayo (yellow card) 38'; Kinsella (yellow card) 72'; Scarr (yellow card) 76'; Gordon (yellow card) 80'	Stadium: Sixfields Stadium; Attendance: 6,260; Referee: Nick Kinseley

10 August 2019 2	Walsall	1–1	Forest Green Rovers	Walsall
15:00 BST	Norman (yellow card) 53'; Scarr (yellow card) 75'; Hardy 86'	Report	Collins (yellow card) 28'; J. Mills 45+6' (pen.) (yellow card) 45+6'; M. Mills (yellow card) 71'	Stadium: Bescot Stadium; Attendance: 5,205; Referee: Robert Lewis

17 August 2019 3	Crewe Alexandra	1–0	Walsall	Crewe
15:00 BST	Nolan 61'; Lancashire (yellow card) 73' (yellow-red card) 90'; Ng (yellow card) 78'	Report	Pring (yellow card) 90+2'; Scarr (yellow card) 90+4'	Stadium: Gresty Road; Attendance: 4,629; Referee: Alan Young

20 August 2019 4	Walsall	0–0	Newport County	Walsall
19:45 BST	Norman (yellow card) 13'; Kinsella (yellow card) 67'	Report	Haynes (yellow card) 32'; Abrahams (yellow card) 63'; Sheehan (yellow card) 66'; Howkins (yellow card) 88'	Stadium: Bescot Stadium; Attendance: 4,337; Referee: Darren Handley

24 August 2019 5	Plymouth Argyle	3–0	Walsall	Plymouth
15:00 BST	Taylor 13', 89'; Sawyer (yellow card) 37'; Sarcevic 82' (red card) 85'	Report	Norman (yellow card) 65'; Liddle (yellow card) 77'; Scarr (yellow card) 80'; Hardy (yellow card) 90+2'	Stadium: Home Park; Attendance: 9,337; Referee: Josh Smith

31 August 2019 6	Walsall	1–3	Grimsby Town	Walsall
15:00 BST	Lavery 5'; Pring (yellow card) 80'	Report	Öhman (yellow card) 20'; Whitehouse 41'; Hanson 68', 81' (pen.)	Stadium: Bescot Stadium; Attendance: 4,812; Referee: David Rock

7 September 2019 7	Colchester United	0–0	Walsall	Colchester
15:00 BST		Report	Liddle (yellow card) 55'; Kinsella (yellow card) 78'	Stadium: Colchester Community Stadium; Attendance: 3,265; Referee: Brett Huxtable

14 September 2019 8	Walsall	0–1	Bradford City	Bescot
15:00 BST	Jules (yellow card) 10'	Report	Mellor (yellow card) 29'; Vaughan (penalty missed) 76'; Kinsella 83' (o.g.)	Stadium: Bescot Stadium; Attendance: 4,649; Referee: Anthony Backhouse

17 September 2019 9	Morecambe	0–1	Walsall	Morecambe
19:45 BST	Old (yellow card) 79'	Report	Sinclair 4'; Liddle (yellow card) 54'	Stadium: Globe Arena; Attendance: 1,616; Referee: James Oldham

21 September 2019 10	Walsall	1–0	Scunthorpe United	Bescot
15:00 BST	Guthrie (yellow card) 36'; Holden (yellow card) 61'; Clarke 65'	Report	Colclough (yellow card) 64'	Stadium: Bescot Stadium; Attendance: 4,037; Referee: Marc Edwards

28 September 2019 11	Crawley Town	2–3	Walsall	Crawley
15:00 BST	Nathaniel-George 42' (pen.); Sesay (yellow card) 66'; Payne 90+3'	Report	Clarke 14'; Adebayo 27'; McDonald 44'; Holden (yellow card) 60'; Kinsella (yellow card) 90+4'	Stadium: Broadfield Stadium; Attendance: 2,275; Referee: Sam Purkiss

5 October 2019 12	Walsall	0–3	Salford City	Bescot
15:00 BST		Report	Armstrong 21'; Rooney (yellow card) 29'; Jervis 49'; Jones (yellow card) 65'; Touray 72'; Burgess (yellow card) 90+3'	Stadium: Bescot Stadium; Attendance: 4,751; Referee: Trevor Kettle

12 October 2019 13	Leyton Orient	3–1	Walsall	Leyton
15:00 BST	Harrold (yellow card) 33' (goal) 60'; Widdowson 48'; Happe (yellow card) 59'; Wilkinson 75' (red card) 80'	Report	Jules (yellow card) 15'; Sinclair 21'; Scarr (yellow card) 80'	Stadium: Brisbane Road; Attendance: 6,951; Referee: Ben Toner

19 October 2019 14	Walsall	1–2	Cheltenham Town	Bescot
15:00 BST	Gordon 52' (pen.); Kinsella (yellow card) 66'; Clarke (yellow card) 77'	Report	Broom (yellow card) 30'; Tozer 35'; Varney 58'; Flinders (yellow card) 81'	Stadium: Bescot Stadium; Attendance: 4,494; Referee: Darren Drysdale

22 October 2019 15	Oldham Athletic	2–0	Walsall	Oldham
19:45 BST	Wilson 55'; Azankpo 69'; Iacovitti (yellow card) 80'	Report	Sadler (red card) 52'	Stadium: Boundary Park; Attendance: 2,438; Referee: Oliver Yates

26 October 2019 16	Walsall	1–2	Mansfield Town	Bescot
15:00 BST	Sinclair (yellow card) 37'; Adebayo 45'	Report	MacDonald (yellow card) 17' (goal) 68'; Cook 30'	Stadium: Bescot Stadium; Attendance: 4,521; Referee: Andy Haines

2 November 2019 17	Swindon Town	2–1	Walsall	Swindon
15:00 GMT	Doyle 5'; Jaiyesimi 47'	Report	Gaffney 54'	Stadium: County Ground; Attendance: 7,014; Referee: Josh Smith

16 November 2019 18	Walsall	2–1	Cambridge United	Bescot
15:00 GMT	Gordon 1'; Sadler 10'; Holden (yellow card) 84'	Report	Roles (yellow card) 64'; Knibbs 90+2'	Stadium: Bescot Stadium; Attendance: 5,429; Referee: Paul Marsden

23 November 2019 19	Walsall	0–0	Stevenage	Bescot
15:00 GMT	Scarr (yellow card) 68'	Report	Cowley (yellow card) 43'; Fernandez (yellow card) 90+2'	Stadium: Bescot Stadium; Attendance: 4,938; Referee: Lee Swabey

7 December 2019 20	Port Vale	0–1	Walsall	Burslem
15:00 GMT	Conlon (red card) 82'	Report	Adebayo 46'; Gordon (yellow card) 66'	Stadium: Vale Park; Attendance: 5,079; Referee: Andy Haines

14 December 2019 21	Walsall	1–1	Macclesfield Town	Bescot
15:00 GMT	McDonald 74'; Gordon (yellow card) 83'	Report	Welch-Hayes 8'; Evans (yellow card) 11'; Gnahoua (yellow card) 22'	Stadium: Bescot Stadium; Attendance: 3,846; Referee: James Oldham

21 December 2019 22	Exeter City	3–3	Walsall	Exeter
15:00 GMT	Bowman 32', 41'; L. Martin 64'; A. Martin (yellow card) 80'	Report	Sweeney 13' (o.g.); Lavery 18'; Gordon 31' (yellow card) 68'; Guthrie (yellow card) 67'	Stadium: St James Park; Attendance: 4,323; Referee: David Rock

26 December 2019 23	Scunthorpe United	0–2	Walsall	Scunthorpe
15:00 GMT		Report	McDonald 43'; Kinsella (yellow card) 78'; Bates 84'	Stadium: Glanford Park; Attendance: 3,842; Referee: Carl Boyeson

29 December 2019 24	Walsall	1–2	Carlisle United	Bescot
15:00 GMT	Adebayo 70'; Clarke (red card) 77'; Cockerill-Mollett (yellow card) 84'	Report	Hayden (yellow card) 48'; Thomas 52'; McKirdy 90+4'	Stadium: Bescot Stadium; Attendance: 4,794; Referee: Ben Toner

1 January 2020 25	Walsall	1–0	Leyton Orient	Bescot
15:00 GMT	Gordon 43' (yellow card) 62'; Pring (yellow card) 56' (yellow-red card) 66'; Kinsella (yellow card) 73'; Roberts (yellow card) 90+1'	Report	Judd (yellow card) 23'	Stadium: Bescot Stadium; Attendance: 4,263; Referee: Darren Handley

4 January 2020 26	Salford City	1–2	Walsall	Salford
15:00 GMT	Thomas-Asante 62'; Hogan (yellow card) 71'; Touray (yellow card) 81'	Report	Lavery 27'; Gordon 51'	Stadium: Moor Lane; Attendance: 3,173; Referee: Christopher Pollard

11 January 2020 27	Cheltenham Town	3–1	Walsall	Cheltenham
15:00 GMT	Sheaf 18' (yellow card) 52'; Thomas 48'; May 72' (yellow card) 72'	Report	Clarke (yellow card) 57'; Adebayo 78'	Stadium: Whaddon Road; Attendance: 3,868; Referee: Paul Marsden

18 January 2020 28	Walsall	2–1	Crawley Town	Bescot
15:00 GMT	Gordon 72'; McDonald 88'	Report	Camará 27' (yellow card) 82'; Dacres-Cogley (yellow card) 66'; Lubala (yellow card) 76'	Stadium: Bescot Stadium; Attendance: 4,011; Referee: Sebastian Stocksbridge

25 January 2020 29	Carlisle United	2–1	Walsall	Carlisle
15:00 GMT	Anderton 21'; Jones (yellow card) 34'; Webster (yellow card) 36'; Roberts 43' (o.g.); Scougall (yellow card) 75'	Report	Sadler 50'	Stadium: Brunton Park; Attendance: 4,097; Referee: James Oldham

28 January 2020 30	Walsall	0–2	Morecambe	Bescot
19:45 GMT	McDonald (penalty missed) 23'; Gordon (yellow card) 45'	Report	Slew (yellow card) 45'; Old 68'; Mendes Gomes (yellow card) 77' (goal) 90+6'; Mbulu (yellow card) 89'	Stadium: Bescot Stadium; Attendance: 3,554; Referee: Ross Joyce

1 February 2020 31	Walsall	1–2	Crewe Alexandra	Bescot
15:00 GMT	Lavery 15' (yellow card) 88'; Kinsella (yellow card) 64'; Facey (yellow card) 79'	Report	Powell 50'; Finney 68'	Stadium: Bescot Stadium; Attendance: 4,610; Referee: Lee Swabey

8 February 2020 32	Forest Green Rovers	1–2	Walsall	Nailsworth
15:00 GMT	Collins 87'	Report	Gordon (yellow card) 39' (goal) 52' (pen.); McDonald 73'; Sheron (yellow card) 77'	Stadium: The New Lawn; Attendance: 3,136; Referee: Antony Coggins

11 February 2020 33	Newport County	0–0	Walsall	Newport
19:45 GMT	Willmott (yellow card) 87'	Report	Gordon (yellow card) 36'; Adebayo (yellow card) 87'	Stadium: Rodney Parade; Attendance: 3,049; Referee: Brett Huxtable

15 February 2020 34	Walsall	3–2	Northampton Town	Bescot
15:00 GMT	Gordon 55'; Guthrie 77'; Holden 90+3'	Report	Morton 21', 39'; Turnbull (yellow card) 68'; Jones (yellow card) 76'; Hoskins (yellow card) 90+5'	Stadium: Bescot Stadium; Attendance: 4,541; Referee: Ben Toner

22 February 2020 35	Walsall	2–2	Port Vale	Bescot
15:00 GMT	Adebayo 15'; Gordon 58'	Report	Legge 12'; Burgess 36'	Stadium: Bescot Stadium; Attendance: 6,301; Referee: Anthony Backhouse

29 February 2020	Stevenage	v	Walsall	Stevenage
15:00 GMT		Report		Stadium: Broadhall Way
Note: Match was postponed due to a waterlogged pitch.

7 March 2020 36	Walsall	3–1	Exeter City	Bescot
15:00 GMT	Holden 3'; Adebayo 71', 90+2'; Guthrie (yellow card) 75'; Gordon (yellow card) 87'	Report	Richardson (yellow card) 33'; Bowman 51' (yellow card) 90+3'	Stadium: Bescot Stadium; Attendance: 5,521; Referee: Tom Nield

14 March 2020	Macclesfield Town	v	Walsall	Macclesfield
15:00 GMT				Stadium: Moss Rose
Note: Season was suspended until 3 April 2020, due to the COVID-19 pandemic.

17 March 2020	Walsall	v	Oldham Athletic	Bescot
19:45 GMT				Stadium: Bescot Stadium
Note: Season was suspended until 3 April 2020, due to the COVID-19 pandemic.

21 March 2020	Mansfield Town	v	Walsall	Mansfield
15:00 GMT				Stadium: Field Mill
Note: Season was suspended until 3 April 2020, due to the COVID-19 pandemic.

28 March 2020	Walsall	v	Swindon Town	Bescot
15:00 GMT				Stadium: Bescot Stadium
Note: Season was suspended until 3 April 2020, due to the COVID-19 pandemic.

4 April 2020	Cambridge United	v	Walsall	Cambridge
15:00 BST				Stadium: Abbey Stadium
Note: On 3 April, the English Football League decided to postpone all football until safe to do so due to the COVID-19 pandemic.

10 April 2020	Walsall	v	Plymouth Argyle	Bescot
15:00 BST				Stadium: Bescot Stadium
Note: On 3 April, the English Football League decided to postpone all football until safe to do so due to the COVID-19 pandemic.

13 April 2020	Grimsby Town	v	Walsall	Cleethorpes
13:00 BST				Stadium: Blundell Park
Note: On 3 April, the English Football League decided to postpone all football until safe to do so due to the COVID-19 pandemic.

18 April 2020	Walsall	v	Colchester United	Bescot
15:00 BST				Stadium: Bescot Stadium
Note: On 3 April, the English Football League decided to postpone all football until safe to do so due to the COVID-19 pandemic.

25 April 2020	Bradford City	v	Walsall	Bradford
15:00 BST				Stadium: Valley Parade
Note: On 3 April, the English Football League decided to postpone all football until safe to do so due to the COVID-19 pandemic.

=== FA Cup ===
The first round draw was made on 21 October 2019. The second round draw was made live on 11 November from Chichester City's stadium, Oaklands Park.

9 November 2019 First round	Walsall	2–2	Darlington	Bescot
15:00 GMT	Pring (yellow card) 12'; Scarr (yellow card) 70' (yellow-red card) 82'; Lavery 86'; Bates 89' (yellow card) 90+2'; Adebayo (yellow card) 90'	Report	Holness 17'; Hatfield (yellow card) 42'; Hedley (yellow card) 68' (yellow-red card) 90'; Rivers 90+7'; Connell (yellow card) 90+7'	Stadium: Bescot Stadium; Attendance: 2,882; Referee: Adrian Quelch

20 November 2019 First round replay	Darlington	0–1	Walsall	Darlington
19:45 GMT	Holness (yellow card) 89'	Report	Lavery 69'; Clarke (yellow card) 71'; Holden (yellow card) 90+2'	Stadium: Blackwell Meadows; Attendance: 3,106; Referee: Scott Oldham

30 November 2019 Second round	Walsall	0–1	Oxford United	Bescot
15:00 GMT	Cockerill-Mollett (yellow card) 25'; Kinsella (yellow card) 41'	Report	Dickie (yellow card) 19'; Henry 84'; Hall (yellow card) 90+1'	Stadium: Bescot Stadium; Attendance: 3,224; Referee: Leigh Doughty

=== EFL Cup ===
The first round draw was made on 20 June.

13 August 2019 First round	Walsall	2–3	Crawley Town	Bescot
19:45 BST	Lavery 54' (pen.), 71'	Report	Morais 21'; Dallison 48', (yellow card) 76'; Nadesan 56'	Stadium: Bescot Stadium; Attendance: 2,451; Referee: Carl Boyeson

=== EFL Trophy ===
On 9 July 2019, the pre-determined group stage draw was announced with Invited clubs to be drawn on 12 July 2019. The draw for the second round was made on 16 November 2019 live on Sky Sports. The third round draw was confirmed on 5 December 2019.

Pos	Div	Team	Pld	W	PW	PL	L	GF	GA	GD	Pts	Qualification
1	L2	Walsall	3	2	0	1	0	7	0	+7	7	Advance to Round 2
2	L1	Coventry City	3	1	1	1	0	3	2	+1	6	Advance to Round 2
3	L2	Forest Green Rovers	3	1	1	0	1	3	8	−5	5	
4	ACA	Southampton U21	3	0	0	0	3	4	7	−3	0	

Source: EFL.com

3 September 2019 Group stage	Coventry City	0–0 (5–4 p)	Walsall	Bordesley
19:45 BST	Watson (yellow card) 25'; Bapaga (yellow card) 90+1'	Report	Bates (yellow card) 38'; Pring (yellow card) 62'	Stadium: St Andrew's; Attendance: 1,005; Referee: Will Finnie
	Penalties
	Biamou (penalty scored); Bakayoko (penalty missed); McFadzean (penalty missed); Eccles (penalty scored); Bapaga (penalty scored); McCallum (penalty scored); Watson (penalty scored)		Gaffney (penalty missed); Norman (penalty scored); Adebayo (penalty missed); Hardy (penalty scored); Liddle (penalty scored); Bates (penalty scored); Kinsella (penalty missed)

1 October 2019 Group stage	Walsall	1–0	Southampton U21	Bescot
19:00 BST	Scarr 45'	Report	O'Driscoll (yellow card) 81'; Klarer (yellow card) 89'	Stadium: Bescot Stadium; Attendance: 732; Referee: Peter Wright

12 November 2019 Group stage	Walsall	6-0	Forest Green Rovers	Bescot
19:00 GMT	Gordon 23', 33', 50' (pen.); McDonald 72'; Kinsella 74' (yellow card) 87'; Norman 90'	Report	Collins (red card) 51'	Stadium: Bescot Stadium; Attendance: 621; Referee: Tom Nield

3 December 2019 Second round	Walsall	3–2	Chelsea U21	Bescot
19:45 GMT	Lavery 52' (pen.); McDonald 79'; Scarr 90+4'	Report	Lamptey 3', 10'; Guehi (yellow card) 90'	Stadium: Bescot Stadium; Attendance: 941; Referee: Antony Coggins

7 January 2020 Third round	Walsall	1–2	Portsmouth	Bescot
19:45 GMT	Perry (yellow card) 37'; Adebayo (penalty missed) 45+2'; Lavery 86' (pen.)	Report	Marquis 23'; Hackett-Fairchild (yellow card) 44'; Harrison 82'	Stadium: Bescot Stadium; Attendance: 1,082; Referee: Anthony Backhouse

== Transfers ==
=== Transfers in ===
Date from	Position	Nationality	Name	From	Fee	Ref.
1 July 2019	CF	(England)	Elijah Adebayo	(England) Fulham	Free transfer	
1 July 2019	CB	(England)	James Clarke	(England) Bristol Rovers	Free transfer	
1 July 2019	AM	(England)	James Hardy	(England) AFC Fylde	Free transfer	
1 July 2019	CM	(England)	Jack Kiersey	(England) Everton	Free transfer	
1 July 2019	CM	(England)	Stuart Sinclair	(England) Bristol Rovers	Free transfer	
2 July 2019	RB	(England)	Shay Facey	(England) Northampton Town	Free transfer	
11 July 2019	CM	(England)	Danny Guthrie	Free agent	Free transfer	
11 July 2019	CB	(England)	Mat Sadler	(England) Shrewsbury Town	Free transfer	
11 July 2019	RW	(England)	Wes McDonald	Free agent	Free transfer	
26 July 2019	DM	(England)	Gary Liddle	(England) Carlisle United	Free transfer	
26 July 2019	CB	(Scotland)	Zak Jules	(England) Macclesfield Town	Undisclosed	
6 August 2019	CF	(Northern Ireland)	Caolan Lavery	(England) Sheffield United	Free transfer	
16 January 2020	LW	(England)	Jack Nolan	(England) Reading	Undisclosed	

=== Loans in ===
Date from	Position	Nationality	Name	From	Date until	Ref.
3 July 2019	LB	(England)	Cameron Pring	(England) Bristol City	30 June 2020	
8 July 2019	GK	(England)	Jack Rose	(England) Southampton	30 June 2020	
26 July 2019	CF	(Northern Ireland)	Rory Holden	(England) Bristol City	30 June 2020	
31 August 2019	CF	(Republic of Ireland)	Rory Gaffney	(England) Salford City	24 February 2020	
21 January 2020	CB	(England)	Nathan Sheron	(England) Fleetwood Town	30 June 2020	

=== Loans out ===
Date from	Position	Nationality	Name	To	Date until	Ref.
13 September 2019	CF	(England)	Mitchel Candlin	(England) Nuneaton Borough	7 January 2020	
10 October 2019	CB	(England)	Tom Leak	(England) Salisbury	November 2019	
25 October 2019	RB	(England)	Luke Little	(England) Tamworth	25 November 2019	
29 November 2019	CB	(England)	Tom Leak	(England) Salisbury	March 2020	
19 December 2019	DM	(England)	Gary Liddle	(England) Hartlepool United	30 June 2020	
13 February 2020	MF	(England)	Joe Willis	(England) Salisbury	March 2020	

=== Transfers out ===
Date from	Position	Nationality	Name	To	Fee	Ref.
1 July 2019	CF	(England)	Andy Cook	(England) Mansfield Town	Undisclosed	
1 July 2019	RB	(Scotland)	Nicky Devlin	(Scotland) Livingston	Free transfer	
1 July 2019	GK	(England)	Chris Dunn	(England) Maidenhead United	Released	
1 July 2019	CM	(England)	Joe Edwards	(England) Plymouth Argyle	Released	
1 July 2019	CB	(England)	Jon Guthrie	(Scotland) Livingston	Released	
1 July 2019	MF	(England)	Tobias Hayles-Docherty	Free agent	Released	
1 July 2019	RM	(England)	Zeli Ismail	(England) Bradford City	Released	
1 July 2019	LB	(England)	Luke Leahy	(England) Bristol Rovers	Released	
1 July 2019	LW	(England)	Kieron Morris	(England) Tranmere Rovers	Released	
1 July 2019	AM	(Belgium)	Omar Mussa	Free agent	Released	
1 July 2019	DM	(England)	Isaiah Osbourne	(England) Nuneaton Borough	Released	
1 July 2019	FW	(England)	Cameron Peters	(England) Bromsgrove Sporting	Released	
1 July 2019	MF	(England)	Jordan Sangha	(England) Evesham United	Released	
25 July 2019	DM	(England)	George Dobson	(England) Sunderland	Undisclosed	
1 August 2019	CF	(England)	Morgan Ferrier	(England) Tranmere Rovers	Undisclosed	
8 September 2019	GK	(England)	Joe Slinn	(England) Atherton Collieries	Free transfer	
1 January 2020	RB	(England)	Luke Little	(England) Tamworth	Free transfer	

== Player statistics ==
=== Appearances and goals ===
As of 28 May 2020

No.	Pos	Nat	Player	Total		League Two		FA Cup		EFL Cup		EFL Trophy	
No.	Pos	Nat	Player	Apps	Goals	Apps	Goals	Apps	Goals	Apps	Goals	Apps	Goals
1	GK	(England) ENG	Liam Roberts	39	0	32	0	2	0	1	0	4	0
2	DF	(England) ENG	Cameron Norman	24	1	12+6	0	1	0	1	0	3+1	1
3	DF	(England) ENG	Cameron Pring	24	0	20+1	0	1	0	0	0	2	0
4	DF	(England) ENG	Mat Sadler	32	2	24+3	2	3	0	1	0	1	0
5	DF	(England) ENG	James Clarke	32	3	27	3	2	0	1	0	2	0
6	DF	(England) ENG	Dan Scarr	40	2	32+1	0	1+2	0	0	0	4	2
7	MF	(England) ENG	Stuart Sinclair	27	2	22+4	2	0	0	1	0	0	0
8	MF	(Republic of Ireland) IRL	Liam Kinsella	40	1	28+3	0	3	0	1	0	5	1
9	FW	(Northern Ireland) NIR	Caolan Lavery	34	10	22+5	4	2+1	2	0+1	2	2+1	2
10	FW	(England) ENG	Josh Gordon	40	12	26+8	9	2	0	1	0	3	3
11	FW	(England) ENG	Elijah Adebayo	37	8	15+15	8	1+1	0	1	0	2+2	0
13	GK	(England) ENG	Jack Rose	6	0	4	0	1	0	0	0	1	0
14	DF	(England) ENG	Kory Roberts	4	0	1+1	0	0	0	0	0	0+2	0
15	FW	(Northern Ireland) NIR	Rory Holden	36	2	23+6	2	3	0	0	0	4	0
16	MF	(England) ENG	Danny Guthrie	28	1	17+8	1	0+1	0	0	0	2	0
17	MF	(England) ENG	James Hardy	16	1	2+9	1	0+1	0	0+1	0	0+3	0
18	MF	(England) ENG	Jack Kiersey	3	0	1+1	0	0	0	0	0	0+1	0
19	FW	(England) ENG	Mitchel Candlin	0	0	0	0	0	0	0	0	0	0
20	MF	(England) ENG	Alfie Bates	21	2	9+4	1	2+1	1	1	0	3+1	0
21	DF	(Republic of Ireland) IRL	Callum Cockerill-Mollett	15	0	6+3	0	2	0	1	0	3	0
22	DF	(England) ENG	Luke Little	0	0	0	0	0	0	0	0	0	0
22	DF	(England) ENG	Joe Foulkes	0	0	0	0	0	0	0	0	0	0
23	DF	(England) ENG	Tom Leak	0	0	0	0	0	0	0	0	0	0
24	DF	(England) ENG	Shay Facey	17	0	12+1	0	2	0	0	0	2	0
25	MF	(England) ENG	Wes McDonald	35	7	21+7	5	1+1	0	0+1	0	2+2	2
26	MF	(England) ENG	Gary Liddle	16	0	10+2	0	1	0	0	0	3	0
27	MF	(England) ENG	Joe Willis	1	0	0	0	0	0	0	0	0+1	0
28	FW	(England) ENG	Luke Pearce	0	0	0	0	0	0	0	0	0	0
29	MF	(England) ENG	Jack Nolan	4	0	0+4	0	0	0	0	0	0	0
30	FW	(Republic of Ireland) IRL	Rory Gaffney	22	1	11+4	1	2+1	0	0	0	3+1	0
31	GK	(England) ENG	Dominic Rogerson	0	0	0	0	0	0	0	0	0	0
32	MF	(England) ENG	Sam Perry	1	0	0	0	0	0	0	0	1	0
33	DF	(Scotland) SCO	Zak Jules	22	0	13+4	0	1	0	1	0	3	0
34	MF	(England) ENG	Nathan Sheron	7	0	6+1	0	0	0	0	0	0	0
