= Tom Leak =

English footballer

Personal information
- Full name: Thomas Leak
- Date of birth: 31 October 2000 (age 26)
- Place of birth: Burton upon Trent, England
- Height: 6 ft 2 in (1.88 m)
- Position: Defender

Team information
- Current team: Kettering Town

Youth career
- 2015–2019: Walsall

Senior career*
Years	Team	Apps	(Gls)
2019–2022	Walsall	12	(0)
2019	→ Salisbury (loan)	4	(1)
2019–2020	→ Salisbury (loan)	12	(1)
2020	→ Bath City (loan)	5	(0)
2022–2023	Kidderminster Harriers	10	(1)
2022–2023	→ Alfreton Town (loan)	0	(0)
2023–2025	Boston United	46	(3)
2025	→ Chester (loan)	9	(0)
2025–2026	Chester	32	(1)
2026–	Kettering Town	12	(0)
- * Club domestic league appearances and goals as of 13:01, 2 November 2026 (UTC)

Thomas Leak (born 31 October 2000) is an English professional footballer who plays as a defender for Kettering Town.

== Career ==
=== Walsall ===
Born in Burton upon Trent, Leak joined Walsall's youth set-up in April 2015. After signing his first professional contract with the club in summer 2019, he joined Salisbury on a one-month loan on 10 October 2019. He scored once in six appearances on loan at the club. He returned to Salisbury in late November 2019 on a loan until 11 January 2020. In January 2020, his loan was extended until March. He returned to Walsall in March 2020, having scored once in 15 appearances in his second loan spell at the club.

In July 2020, Leak signed a new contract with Walsall. On 6 October 2020, he joined Bath City on a one-month youth loan. He made 5 league appearances on loan at the club. On 23 March 2020, Leak made his Walsall debut, starting in a 0–0 League Two draw away to Southend United, with Walsall manager Brian Dutton describing Leak's performance as "outstanding". He made 6 appearances during the 2020–21 season.

Leak was released by the club at the end of the 2021–22 season.

=== Kidderminster Harriers ===
On 10 June 2022, Leak agreed to join National League North club Kidderminster Harriers upon the expiration of his Walsall contract.

He joined Alfreton Town on a one-month loan on 29 December 2022.

On 18 May 2023, it was announced that Tom would be released upon the conclusion of his contract following the club's promotion.

=== Boston United ===
On 26 May 2023 it was announced that Leak had signed for the National League North side for the 2023–24 season.

In February 2025, Leak joined National League North side Chester on loan for the remainder of the season. In summer 2025, he joined the club on a permanent basis. He was released at the end of his contract in May 2026.

He signed for Kettering Town in June 2026.

== Personal life ==
Leak is the brother of fellow footballer Ryan who plays for EFL League Two team, Walsall.

== Career statistics ==
As of 21 February 2025

Appearances and goals by club, season and competition
Club	Season	League			FA Cup		EFL Cup		Other		Total	
Club	Season	Division	Apps	Goals	Apps	Goals	Apps	Goals	Apps	Goals	Apps	Goals
Walsall	2019–20	League Two	0	0	0	0	0	0	0	0	0	0
Walsall	2020–21	League Two	6	0	0	0	0	0	0	0	6	0
Walsall	2021–22	League Two	6	0	0	0	1	0	2 (Note: Appearance(s) in EFL Trophy)	0	9	0
Walsall	Total		12	0	0	0	1	0	2	0	15	0
Salisbury (loan)	2019–20	Southern League Premier Division South	16	2	0	0	—		5 (Note: Appearance(s) in FA Trophy)	0	21	2
Bath City (loan)	2020–21	National League South	5	0	2	0	—		0	0	7	0
Kidderminster Harriers	2022–23	National League North	10	1	0	0	—		0	0	10	1
Alfreton Town (loan)	2022–23	National League North	0	0	0	0	—		0	0	0	0
Boston United	2023–24	National League North	29	3	0	0	—		1	0	30	3
Boston United	2024–25	National League	17	0	2	0	—		6 (Note: Two appearances in FA Trophy, four appearances in National League Cup)	25	0	
Boston United	Total		46	3	2	0	0	0	7	0	55	3
Career total			89	6	4	0	1	0	14	0	108	6

== Honours ==
Kidderminster Harriers

- National League North play-offs: 2023

Boston United

- National League North play-offs: 2024
