= Brian Dutton =

English footballer (born 1985)

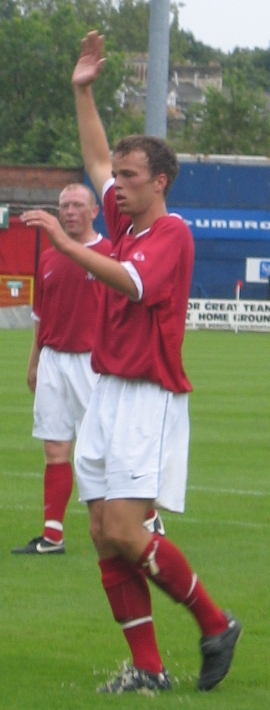

Personal information
- Date of birth: 12 April 1985 (age 41)
- Place of birth: Malton, England
- Positions: Defender; midfielder; forward

Team information
- Current team: Salisbury (manager)

Senior career*
Years	Team	Apps	(Gls)
2001–2003	Pickering Town		
2003–2004	Cambridge United	3	(0)
2004–2005	Pickering Town		
2005–2006	Weymouth	28	(5)
2006–2007	Eastleigh	10	(1)
2007	Weymouth	19	(0)
2007	Mangotsfield United	5	(0)
2007	Dorchester Town	2	(0)
2008	Pickering Town		
2008–2009	Salisbury City	27	(2)
2009–2010	Harrogate Town	16	(2)
2010	Northwich Victoria	20	(5)
2010–2014	Salisbury City	140	(9)
2014–2016	Havant & Waterlooville	52	(2)
2016–2017	Eastbourne Borough	20	(2)
2017	Salisbury		
Total		342+	(28+)

Managerial career
- 2021: Walsall
- 2022–: Salisbury
- * Club domestic league appearances and goals

Brian Dutton (born 12 April 1985) is an English professional football coach and former player who currently manages National League South club Salisbury.

In a 16-year-long playing career, Dutton was a versatile player who was often fielded in a variety of positions in defence, midfield and attack. Apart from a short spell in the Third Division with Cambridge United he spent his entire career playing non-league football, most notably for Salisbury City where he earned two promotions as club captain.

After retiring as a player he went into coaching at Bristol Rovers, joining up with former Salisbury City manager Darrell Clarke. He originally worked with the U21 squad and focused on player recruitment before being promoted to first team duties in December 2017.

He followed Clarke to Walsall in the summer of 2019 as his assistant manager, before taking over as interim head coach himself when Clarke left the club in February 2021. After the season was concluded, Walsall parted ways with Dutton in May 2021.

== Playing career ==
=== Early career ===
Born in Malton, North Yorkshire, Dutton played for his local team Brooklyn as a child, and was invited to join the Scarborough School of Excellence. He also had a trial with Swindon Town. He joined his first senior side, Pickering Town, at the age of 16. He originally played as a striker but was also capable of dropping back into midfield.

He had just broken into Pickering's first team when he was spotted by a Cambridge United scout and was invited for a trial in November 2003. He only played for 30 minutes but was offered a contract on the spot. Here he settled into a midfield role.

Dutton was released by Cambridge and returned to Pickering Town for the start of the 2004–05 season.

Brian Dutton was invited to go on trial with Weymouth manager Steve Johnson signing Dutton, who had decided he wanted to return to the game. He then had his contract extended for another year during which he scored the winning goal in the local derby with Dorchester Town. Dutton was offered a new contract by the club at the end of the 2005–06 season but turned it down and was released.

Dutton started the 2006–07 with Eastleigh but an injury kept out of the game for three months.

Dutton rejoined Weymouth in January 2007. He left at the end of the 2006–07 season and went on trial with York City.

He joined Mangotsfield United to keep match fitness and signed for Dorchester Town in September 2007. He left the club in October.

In March 2008 he re-signed for Pickering Town.

=== Salisbury City ===
He joined Salisbury City in the Conference National on a one-year contract in August 2008 after a successful trial spell.

After only one year and 27 appearances, he moved to Conference North side Harrogate Town on 23 July 2009. After spending half a season at Harrogate Town, he was signed by Northwich Victoria until the end of the 2009–10 season. At the end of the season Brian was offered an improved contract from Northwich but decided to turn it down and to rejoin his former teammate, and now manager, Darrell Clarke, at Salisbury City.

He became a utility player for the club, playing in a variety of places all over the pitch, before featuring on a regular basis at centre back – making the position his own. After the temporary departure of captain Chris Giles, manager Darrell Clarke gave the honour of club captain to Dutton, who led Salisbury to the Conference South after a play-off final victory against Hednesford Town on penalties.

He was rewarded with a new contract and club captaincy full-time and went on to help Salisbury to yet another promotion, once again via the playoffs, the final this time was against Chris Kinnear's Dover Athletic. Salisbury won the final in extra time, which meant Salisbury had earned promotion to the Conference National, the league they had been thrown out of three seasons earlier and Dutton had managed two promotions in the two seasons he was captain at the club.

=== Later career ===
In June 2014, Dutton left Salisbury City to sign for Havant & Waterlooville.

Dutton signed for Eastbourne Borough on 6 July 2016.

In February 2017, Dutton re-joined Salisbury under new manager Steve Claridge. Alongside playing he worked towards his coaching badges, earning a UEFA A Licence and set up Salisbury soccer schools, providing coaching to children throughout Wiltshire and Hampshire.

== Coaching career ==
=== Bristol Rovers ===
In March 2017, Dutton was appointed under-23 assistant coach and overseas scout at League One club Bristol Rovers.

The 2017–18 season saw Dutton promoted to first team duties in late December 2017, standing in for long-time first team coach Steve Yates.

The 2018–19 season saw Dutton continue with his first team duties, mainly focussing on attacking set pieces. The attacking set piece conversion rate improved vastly in comparison to the 2017–18 season, with Bristol Rovers doubling their conversion rate from corners after only 16 games of the season.

In December 2018, long-time Bristol Rovers manager Darrell Clarke and his assistant Marcus Stewart left the club, being replaced by interim manager Graham Coughlan, assisted by Dutton and Chris Hargreaves.

=== Walsall ===
In May 2019, Dutton was announced to have left Bristol Rovers before he was appointed assistant manager at Walsall a week later where he would again be working alongside Darrell Clarke and Marcus Stewart. He became Walsall's head coach in February 2021 after Clarke joined Port Vale. His first match in charge, at home to Cheltenham Town, resulted in a 1–2 defeat. Dutton inherited the most inexperienced squad in all four English divisions but was particularly commended for the courage he showed by blooding many youngsters into the Walsall team. He gave league debuts to Sam Perry, Tom Leak and Joe Willis.

High-profile former Walsall players such as Elijah Adebayo paid tribute to Dutton and his ability to nurture and develop. Adebayo was quoted saying "Dutton brought me to the football club and Dutts was the main figurehead, not only in training but off the field stuff, checking up on me, giving me little bits of advice, and telling me how I can make the next step up." Adebayo spoke of Dutton being a mentor as well as a coach during his time at Walsall.

Many aspects of Walsall's game improved under Dutton. Defensively the team's clean sheet ratio went from 1 in 9 games to 1 in 3 games and their goals conceded per game ratio reduced significantly. The lack of firepower from the inexperienced squad was a major issue and eventually cost Dutton his job despite the improvements. On 10 May 2021 Walsall parted company with Dutton with Walsall's Chairman Leigh Pomlett saying, "Chairmen often say, 'I made that decision with a heavy heart' and I'm never absolutely convinced they always mean it, on this occasion I can assure you I do, because Brian stepped up to the plate when he didn't need to when Darrell left. He pretty much achieved a lot of the things I wanted him to achieve, particularly with the young players coming through. With the way he dealt with the players, with the courage he showed and the resilience he showed. A lot of the qualities I looks for in human beings that are part of this football club, Brian Dutton has got. Brian did all that he could possibly do at this football club in the few months that he was here, I have nothing but praise for him and I wish him all the best wherever he goes, and I suspect one day he might surface as quite a force and I certainly hope that he does, we all owe him a debt of gratitude." On 10 May 2021, after the season was concluded, Walsall announced that they were parting ways with Dutton.

=== Bristol Rovers Return ===
On 17 March 2022, Dutton returned to League Two side Bristol Rovers in the role of Academy Manager following the departure of Chris Hargreaves. In July 2022, Dutton left the club for family reasons.

=== Salisbury ===
On 14 October 2022, Dutton was appointed manager of one of his former clubs Salisbury following the departure of long-serving manager Steve Claridge. Dutton oversaw the remainder of the season with largely the same squad inherited from Claridge, finishing in fifteenth position. In his first full season in charge, the club finished in third position, defeating AFC Totton on penalties in the play-off final to earn promotion to the National League South, their first season at the level since the club's reformation.

== Personal life ==
Dutton attended Norton College prior to pursuing a national certificate in sport at York College. Brian was halfway through completing a National Diploma in Sport at York college before he decided to postpone the qualification and become the first ever footballer from York College Academy to sign professional terms with a league football club. His father is the former jockey Dave Dutton who won the 1981 Scottish Grand National.

== Managerial statistics ==
As of match played 14 November 2026

Managerial record by team and tenure
Team	From	To	Record					Ref.
Team	From	To	P	W	D	L	Win %	Ref.
Walsall	15 February 2021	10 May 2021	20	3	8	9	15.00	
Salisbury	14 October 2022	Present	197	74	50	73	37.56	
Total			217	77	58	82	35.48	

== Honours ==
=== As a player ===
Salisbury City

- Southern Football League Premier Division play-offs: 2010–11
- Conference South play-offs: 2012–13

=== As a manager ===
Salisbury

- Southern Football League Premier Division South play-offs: 2023–24
