= Rory Holden =

Northern Irish footballer

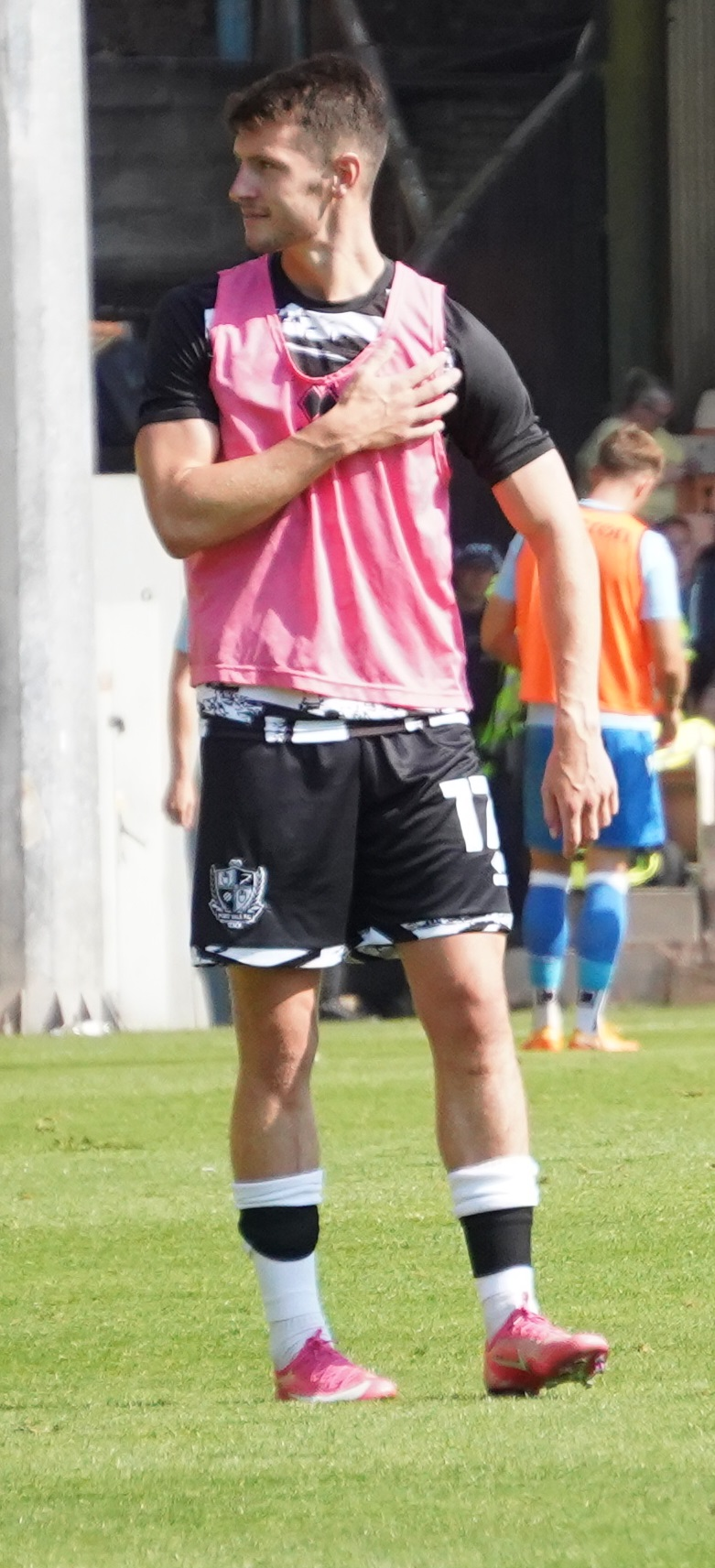
- Holden playing for Port Vale (August 2022)

Personal information
- Full name: Rory Holden
- Date of birth: 23 August 1997 (age 29)
- Place of birth: Derry, Northern Ireland
- Height: 1.65 m (5 ft 5 in)
- Position: Midfielder

Team information
- Current team: The New Saints
- Number: 18

Youth career
- 2012–2016: Derry City

Senior career*
Years	Team	Apps	(Gls)
2016–2017	Derry City	13	(1)
2017–2020	Bristol City	0	(0)
2018	→ Barrow (loan)	5	(0)
2019	→ Rochdale (loan)	6	(0)
2019–2020	→ Walsall (loan)	29	(2)
2020–2022	Walsall	21	(4)
2022–2023	Port Vale	11	(0)
2023–	The New Saints	83	(17)

International career
2018	Northern Ireland U21	3	(1)
- * Club domestic league appearances and goals as of 15:36, 5 November 2026 (UTC)

Rory Holden (born 23 August 1997) is a Northern Irish professional footballer who plays as a midfielder for Cymru Premier club The New Saints.

A Northern Ireland under-21 international, he began his career at Derry City, making his first-team debut in May 2016. He was sold to English club Bristol City in August 2017, and from there he was loaned out to Barrow and Rochdale in the 2018–19 season. He spent the 2019–20 campaign on loan at Walsall and joined the club permanently in August 2020. However, four months later, he got a long-term knee injury and missed much of the 2020–21 season and the 2021–22 campaign. He spent the 2022–23 season with Port Vale before joining Cymru Premier club The New Saints in July 2023. He won the Cymru Premier and Welsh League Cup in the 2023–24 season and helped the club to complete a treble the following season as they also won the Welsh Cup.

== Club career ==
=== Derry City ===
Holden began his career with Derry City, first joining as a 14-year-old. He made his first-team debut on 29 May 2016 when he came on as an 81st-minute substitute for Keith Ward in a 2–0 win over Bray Wanderers at the Brandywell Stadium. He was given a three-year professional contract by manager Kenny Shiels. He earned his first start on 28 October, in a 2–0 victory at St Patrick's Athletic. Having featured four times in the 2016 season, he played another nine League of Ireland Premier Division games in the 2017 season, and scored his first senior goal in a 4–0 home win over Sligo Rovers on 9 July.

=== Bristol City ===
On 30 August 2017, Holden signed with English Championship club Bristol City after a successful trial spell. He had impressed manager Lee Johnson in two trials and the "Robins" agreed to a transfer-deadline day deal worth up to €300,000. However, he never played a first-team game at Ashton Gate.

He joined Barrow on a one-month loan, starting on 14 September 2018. He played five National League games for Ian Evatt's "Bluebirds". He joined League Two club Rochdale on loan for the rest of the 2018–19 season on 3 January 2019. Manager Keith Hill said that "it's important we get players in who have the right mentality and who have the right game brain and intelligent energy, and Rory fits the bill". He played seven matches for Rochdale. He signed a new two-year contract with City in June 2019, with the club retaining a further 12-month option.

=== Walsall ===
On 26 July 2019, he joined League Two club Walsall on a season-long loan following a trial period. He made 36 appearances in the 2019–20 season, and though he played in a variety of positions he particularly impressed in an advanced midfield role. He scored his first goal in English football on 15 February 2020, with his 93rd-minute strike securing a 3–2 victory over Northampton Town at the Bescot Stadium.

On 11 August 2020, he re-joined Walsall on a permanent deal for an undisclosed fee. He made a good start to the 2020–21 season, playing on the right-wing and equalling his season-high goals tally of two by mid-October as the "Saddlers" put together a 12-game unbeaten run in the league. However, he suffered a knee injury before a game at Salford City in December 2020, and though he made a brief return to action the following April in which he was described as a "a breath of fresh air" by interim head coach Brian Dutton, he would then suffer a further setback and was ruled out for the entirety of the 2021–22 campaign, with head coach Matt Taylor stating that he had to undergo another procedure after seeing "the best knee specialist in the country". He left Walsall upon the expiry of his contract in June 2022.

=== Port Vale ===
In June 2022, he began training with League One side Port Vale, who were managed by Darrell Clarke, Holden's former boss at Walsall. The club reportedly offered to pay his medical costs as he continued his recovery from long-term absence. Holden signed for Port Vale on 29 July 2022. He made his debut for the club the following day, though dropped out of the team in mid-August and missed some weeks of the season due to a "minor setback" of an injury. He recovered and contributed with an assist during a 2–1 win over Barnsley in the EFL Trophy Round of 32 on 23 November. David Flitcroft, the club's director of football, confirmed that the player's contract would not be renewed beyond June 2023.

=== The New Saints ===
In June 2023, it was announced that he would sign for Cymru Premier club The New Saints on 1 July 2023, with the manager Craig Harrison emphasising the player's EFL experience and talent. He played 22 league games as TNS were crowned unbeaten league champions in the 2023–24 campaign. He also played in three cup finals as TNS won the 2023–24 Welsh League Cup with a victory over Swansea City U21 and were beaten in the Welsh Cup final by Connah's Quay Nomads. TNS also played in the final of the Scottish Challenge Cup, where they were beaten by Airdrieonians.

The New Saints completed a treble in the 2024–25 campaign, winning the Cymru Premier, Welsh Cup and Welsh League Cup. Holden scored in the Welsh Cup final win over Connah's Quay Nomads. On 7 February 2026, he scored a hat-trick in a 6–0 win over Penybont. The New Saints again won the Cymru Premier in 2025–26, whilst finishing as runners-up of the League Cup following defeat to Barry Town United.

== International career ==
In 2018, Holden won three caps for the Northern Ireland under-21 team in victories against Luxembourg, Spain and Iceland; he scored the only goal of the game against Luxembourg.

== Style of play ==
Holden is a left-footed midfielder with high energy and intelligence levels.

== Career statistics ==
As of match played 3 April 2026

Appearances and goals by club, season and competition
Club	Season	League			National cup (Note: Includes FAI Cup, FA Cup, Welsh Cup)		League cup (Note: Includes League of Ireland Cup, EFL Cup, Welsh League Cup)		Other		Total	
Club	Season	Division	Apps	Goals	Apps	Goals	Apps	Goals	Apps	Goals	Apps	Goals
Derry City	2016	LOI Premier Division	4	0	0	0	0	0	—		4	0
Derry City	2017	LOI Premier Division	9	1	0	0	0	0	2 (Note: Appearances in UEFA Europa League)	0	11	1
Derry City	Total		13	1	0	0	0	0	2	0	15	1
Bristol City	2017–18	Championship	0	0	0	0	0	0	—		0	0
Bristol City	2018–19	Championship	0	0	0	0	0	0	—		0	0
Bristol City	2019–20	Championship	0	0	0	0	0	0	—		0	0
Bristol City	Total		0	0	0	0	0	0	—		0	0
Barrow (loan)	2018–19	National League	5	0	—		—		—		5	0
Rochdale (loan)	2018–19	League Two	6	0	—		—		1 (Note: Appearance(s) in EFL Trophy)	0	7	0
Walsall (loan)	2019–20	League Two	29	2	3	0	0	0	4	0	36	2
Walsall	2020–21	League Two	21	4	1	0	1	0	3	0	26	4
Walsall	2021–22	League Two	0	0	0	0	0	0	0	0	0	0
Walsall	Total		21	4	1	0	1	0	3	0	26	4
Port Vale	2022–23	League One	11	0	1	0	1	0	3	0	16	0
The New Saints	2023–24	Cymru Premier	22	4	3	1	2	0	8 (Note: 4 appearances in Scottish Challenge Cup, 2 appearances in the UEFA Champions League, 2 appearances and 1 goal in the UEFA Conference League)	1	35	6
The New Saints	2024–25	Cymru Premier	25	0	3	2	2	0	14 (Note: 4 appearances in the UEFA Champions League, 8 appearances and 2 goals in the UEFA Conference League, 2 appearances in the UEFA Europa League)	2	44	4
The New Saints	2025–26	Cymru Premier	22	7	0	0	3	2	4 (Note: 2 appearances in the UEFA Champions League, 2 appearances in the UEFA Conference League)	0	29	9
The New Saints	2026–27	Cymru Premier	0	0	0	0	0	0	0	0	0	0
The New Saints	Total		69	11	6	3	7	2	26	3	108	19
Career total			154	18	11	3	9	2	39	3	213	26

== Honours ==
The New Saints

- Cymru Premier: 2023–24, 2024–25 2025–26
- Welsh Cup: 2025; runner-up: 2024
- Welsh League Cup: 2024, 2025; runner-up: 2026
- Scottish Challenge Cup runner-up: 2024
