= Wes McDonald =

English footballer (born 1997)

Personal information
- Full name: Wesley Nurettin McDonald
- Date of birth: 4 May 1997 (age 29)
- Place of birth: Lambeth, England
- Height: 5 ft 9 in (1.74 m)
- Positions: Winger; attacking midfielder

Team information
- Current team: Karşıyaka

Youth career
- 20??–2009: Crystal Palace
- 2009–2013: Fulham
- 2013–2015: Birmingham City

Senior career*
Years	Team	Apps	(Gls)
2015–2018	Birmingham City	0	(0)
2016	→ Nuneaton Town (loan)	4	(0)
2018	→ Solihull Moors (loan)	5	(0)
2018–2019	Yeovil Town	9	(0)
2019–2021	Walsall	69	(7)
2021–2022	Morecambe	17	(0)
2022–2023	Hartlepool United	31	(3)
2023–2024	Partick Thistle	4	(0)
2024	Eastleigh	6	(0)
2025–2026	Mağusa Türk Gücü	7	(0)
2026–	Karşıyaka	0	(0)
- * Club domestic league appearances and goals as of 01:04, 22 May 2026 (UTC)

Wesley Nurettin McDonald (born 4 May 1997) is an English professional footballer who plays as a winger or attacking midfielder for KTFF Süper Lig side Karşıyaka.

McDonald joined Birmingham City from Fulham as a 16-year-old. He spent a month on loan at National League South club Nuneaton Town in 2016, and a month at Solihull Moors of the National League in 2018, but never appeared for Birmingham's first team, and was released at the end of the 2017–18 season. He spent the first half of the following season with League Two club Yeovil Town, joined another League Two club, Walsall, in July 2019, and spent the 2021–22 season with Morecambe of League One. After one season with Hartlepool United of League Two, McDonald signed for Scottish Championship club Partick Thistle in August 2023 and left in January 2024. He returned to the National League with Eastleigh later that year.

== Club career ==
=== Early life and career ===
McDonald was born in London, and joined Fulham's academy from Crystal Palace as a 12-year-old. Through an arrangement with the club, he attended Coombe Boys' School in New Malden, Surrey. He was a member of the England under-16 training squad ahead of the 2012 Victory Shield, but a serious knee injury prevented his participation and kept him out until the following summer, when he took up a scholarship with Fulham. Their academy director described him as "a central midfield player who always looks to break the play up and get us moving forward [and who] can chip in with a goal or two as well."

=== Birmingham City ===
Later that year, he transferred to Birmingham City where he continued his scholarship. At the time, academy coach Steve Spooner described him as "only small" but "a really powerful boy who has an eye for goal [and] likes to take people on". Interviewed a couple of months later, McDonald himself felt his best qualities were strength on the ball, ability to run with it, and goalscoring, but he needed to improve his heading. In late 2014, McDonald suffered a knee ligament injury that restricted his progress, despite which he was given his first professional contract, of two years, in May 2015. He was by then playing in a more advanced role: according to Spooner, he could "play on either flank or off the top. He has good levels of skill, he's very powerful and possesses a great engine. He has pace and scores goals as well."

In his first senior season, McDonald played regularly for the club's under-21 team. On 12 February 2016, he joined National League South (sixth-tier) club Nuneaton Town on a one-month youth loan, following Birmingham teammate Kyle McFarlane whose loan expired the same day. He went straight into the starting eleven for the next day's visit to Brackley Town, and provided the assist for Elliot Whitehouse's goal that secured the team's first win of 2016, before being replaced after 87 minutes. He made four appearances, all starts, during his month. After his return to Birmingham, he appeared as a substitute for the reserve team that lost the 2016 Birmingham Senior Cup final to National League North champions Solihull Moors. He played regularly for Birmingham's under-23 team. In February 2017, coach Richard Beale commented that over the previous few months, McDonald had "really twigged that you have to work really hard without the ball as well", and his development was such that the club confirmed their intention to extend his contract. Towards the end of the 2016–17 season, after McDonald had produced a scoring streak of six goals in five matches for the under-23 team, manager Gianfranco Zola named him as one of the younger players – others named were Corey O'Keeffe and Jack Storer – who would be given a chance of first-team football once the team were sure of avoiding relegation to League One. He finished the season as top scorer for the under-23s, but Birmingham's failure to avoid relegation until the final match meant any first-team debut remained on hold.

The club took up the one-year option on McDonald's contract for the 2017–18 season, and in September, he spent a month on loan at Solihull Moors, where he played five National League matches and one in the Birmingham Senior Cup. He was unable to break into Birmingham's senior squad, and in February 2018, the club confirmed that he would be released. In March, he had a trial with Queens Park Rangers which came to nothing.

=== Yeovil Town ===
On 3 August 2018, McDonald signed a short-term contract with League Two club Yeovil Town, to run until January 2019. He was an unused substitute on the opening day of the season, and made his Football League debut a week later, starting and playing the whole of a 2–2 draw at home to Mansfield Town. On 3 January 2019, having failed to agree a new contract with Yeovil, McDonald was released upon the expiry of his short-term contract.

=== Walsall ===
McDonald signed a short-term contract with recently relegated League Two club Walsall in July 2019. Away to Crawley Town on 28 September, McDonald supplied the cross for Elijah Adebayo to put Walsall 2–0 ahead and then "cut in from the left-wing and curled a beautiful effort into the far corner" for the first goal of his senior career to make the score 3–1; Walsall won the match 3–2.

His deal at Walsall was extended until the summer of 2021 on 7 January 2020. He was released at the end of the 2020–21 season.

=== Morecambe ===
On 22 June 2021, McDonald signed a two-year contract with newly promoted League One club Morecambe. He played the first hour of the opening-day fixture away to Ipswich Town, which Morecambe led 2–1 before the hosts equalised in stoppage time. He played regularly in the first few months of the season, but gradually dropped out of favour, and made the last of his 23 appearances in January 2022.

=== Hartlepool United ===
He left Morecambe by mutual consent on 12 August 2022, and signed for League Two club Hartlepool United later that day. On 16 August, McDonald made his debut in a goalless draw with Tranmere Rovers. Two weeks later, he "showed excellent composure and quick feet to advance his way into the area and find the bottom corner" to tie the scores away to Leyton Orient, but the hosts went on to win 4–2. On 4 October 2022, McDonald scored an 85th-minute winner in a 2–1 win against Doncaster Rovers which was Hartlepool's first league win of the season. McDonald was released by Pools at the end of the 2022–23 season.

=== Partick Thistle ===
McDonald signed a one-year contract with Partick Thistle of the Scottish Championship on 10 August 2023. He made only four league appearances, all from the bench, and left the club by mutual consent on 1 January 2024.

=== Eastleigh ===
McDonald returned to National League football on 6 September 2024 when he joined Eastleigh on a short-term contract. On 18 November 2024, he left the club following the expiration on his contract.

In July 2025, McDonald headed abroad for the first time to join KTFF Süper Lig side Mağusa Türk Gücü. The following summer, McDonald joined league rivals Karşıyaka.

== Career statistics ==
As of match played 25 October 2025

Appearances and goals by club, season and competition
Club	Season	League			National cup (Note: Includes FA Cup, Scottish Cup)		League cup (Note: Includes EFL Cup, Scottish League Cup)		Other		Total	
Club	Season	Division	Apps	Goals	Apps	Goals	Apps	Goals	Apps	Goals	Apps	Goals
Birmingham City	2015–16	Championship	0	0	0	0	0	0	—		0	0
Birmingham City	2016–17	Championship	0	0	0	0	0	0	—		0	0
Birmingham City	2017–18	Championship	0	0	0	0	0	0	—		0	0
Birmingham City	Total		0	0	0	0	0	0	—		0	0
Nuneaton Town (loan)	2015–16	National League North	4	0	—		—		0	0	4	0
Solihull Moors (loan)	2017–18	National League	5	0	0	0	—		1 (Note: Appearance in Birmingham Senior Cup)	0	6	0
Yeovil Town	2018–19	League Two	9	0	1	0	1	0	1 (Note: Appearance(s) in EFL Trophy)	0	12	0
Walsall	2019–20	League Two	28	5	2	0	1	0	4	2	35	7
Walsall	2020–21	League Two	41	2	1	0	1	0	3	1	46	3
Walsall	Total		69	7	3	0	2	0	7	3	81	10
Morecambe	2021–22	League One	17	0	1	0	2	0	3	0	23	0
Morecambe	2022–23	League One	0	0	—		0	0	—		0	0
Morecambe	Total		17	0	1	0	2	0	3	0	23	0
Hartlepool United	2022–23	League Two	31	3	2	0	—		2	0	35	3
Partick Thistle	2023–24	Scottish Championship	4	0	1	0	0	0	1 (Note: Appearance in Scottish Challenge Cup)	0	6	0
Eastleigh	2024–25	National League	6	0	0	0	—		0	0	6	0
Mağusa Türk Gücü	2025–26	KTFF Süper Lig	7	0	0	0	0	0	0	0	7	0
Career total			152	10	8	0	5	0	15	3	180	13
