= 2020–21 Walsall F.C. season =

Walsall
2020–21 season
- Chairman: Leigh Pomlett
- Manager: Darrell Clarke (until 15 February); Brian Dutton (from 15 February)
- Stadium: Bescot Stadium
- League Two: 19th
- FA Cup: First round
- EFL Cup: First round
- EFL Trophy: Group stage
- Top goalscorer: League: Elijah Adebayo (10); All: Elijah Adebayo (10)
Home colours	Away colours	Third colours

The 2020–21 Walsall F.C. season was the club's 133rd season in their history and the second consecutive season in EFL League Two, Along with League Two, the club participated in the FA Cup, EFL Cup and EFL Trophy.

The season covers the period from 1 July 2020 to 30 June 2021.

== Transfers ==
=== Transfers in ===
Date	Position	Nationality	Name	From	Fee	Ref.
11 August 2020	CF	(Northern Ireland)	Rory Holden	(England) Bristol City	Undisclosed	
3 September 2020	RM	(Republic of Ireland)	Emmanuel Osadebe	Free agent	Free transfer	
3 September 2020	GK	(England)	Jack Rose	(England) Southampton	Free transfer	
3 September 2020	RB	(England)	Hayden White	(England) Mansfield Town	Free transfer	

=== Loans in ===
Date from	Position	Nationality	Name	To	Date until	Ref.
7 August 2020	LB	(England)	George Nurse	(England) Bristol City	End of season	
16 October 2020	CF	(England)	Adan George	(England) Birmingham City	End of season	
16 October 2020	CF	(England)	Jake Scrimshaw	(England) Bournemouth	January 2021	
13 January 2021	RW	(Republic of Ireland)	Tyreik Wright	(England) Aston Villa	End of season	
18 January 2021	CF	(England)	Jayden Reid	(England) Birmingham City	27 March 2021 (Note: It was mutually agreed for Jayden to return to Birmingham City)	
20 January 2021	LM	(England)	Frank Vincent	(England) Bournemouth	End of season	
1 February 2021	LB	(England)	Max Melbourne	(England) Lincoln City	End of season	
1 February 2021	CF	(France)	Derick Osei	(England) Oxford United	End of season	

=== Loans out ===
Date from	Position	Nationality	Name	To	Date until	Ref.
6 October 2020	CB	(England)	Tom Leak	(England) Bath City	November 2020	

=== Transfers out ===
Date	Position	Nationality	Name	To	Fee	Ref.
1 July 2020	CF	(England)	Mitchel Candlin	(England) Stafford Rangers	Released	
1 July 2020	MF	(England)	Danny Coogan	Unattached	Released	
1 July 2020	RB	(England)	Shay Facey	Unattached	Released	
1 July 2020	AM	(England)	James Hardy	(England) AFC Telford United	Released	
1 July 2020	DM	(England)	Gary Liddle	(England) Hartlepool United	Released	
1 July 2020	CF	(England)	Alex McSkeane	Unattached	Released	
1 July 2020	CB	(England)	Kory Roberts	(England) Bromley	Released	
11 August 2020	FW	(England)	Luke Pearce	(England) Southampton	Undisclosed	
1 February 2021	CF	(England)	Elijah Adebayo	(England) Luton Town	Undisclosed	
1 February 2021	CM	(England)	Danny Guthrie	Unattached	Mutual consent	
1 February 2021	CB	(Scotland)	Zak Jules	(England) Milton Keynes Dons	Undisclosed	

== Pre-season ==
15 August 2020 Friendly	Crewe Alexandra	2–0	Walsall	Nantwich
15:00 BST	Ainley 1'; Powell 43'	Report		Stadium: Crewe Academy Training Ground; Attendance: 0

18 August 2020 Friendly	Wolverhampton Wanderers Under-23s	0–0	Walsall	Wellington
18:00 BST		Report		Stadium: New Bucks Head; Attendance: 0

21 August 2020 Friendly	Shrewsbury Town	0–1	Walsall	Wellington
12:00 BST		Report	Kinsella 81'	Stadium: New Bucks Head; Attendance: 0

29 August 2020 Friendly	Walsall	1–1	Burton Albion	Bescot
15:00 BST	Gordon 10'	Report	Brayford 14'	Stadium: Bescot Stadium; Attendance: 0

1 September 2020 Friendly	Birmingham City	3–0	Walsall	Kings Norton
15:00 BST	Agus Medina 44'; Miller 56'; Bailey 87'			Stadium: Wast Hills Training Complex; Attendance: 0

== Competitions ==
=== EFL League Two ===
==== League table ====
Pos	Team	Pld	W	D	L	GF	GA	GD	Pts	Promotion, qualification or relegation
15	Bradford City	46	16	11	19	48	53	−5	59	
16	Mansfield Town	46	13	19	14	57	55	+2	58	
17	Harrogate Town	46	16	9	21	52	61	−9	57	
18	Oldham Athletic	46	15	9	22	72	81	−9	54	
19	Walsall	46	11	20	15	45	53	−8	53	
20	Colchester United	46	11	18	17	44	61	−17	51	
21	Barrow	46	13	11	22	53	59	−6	50	
22	Scunthorpe United	46	13	9	24	41	64	−23	48	
23	Southend United (R)	46	10	15	21	29	58	−29	45	Relegation to National League

Updated to match(es) played on 31 May 2021. Source: EFL Official Website
Rules for classification: 1) Points; 2) Goal difference; 3) Number of goals scored; 4) Head-to-head results; 5) Wins; 6) Away goals; 7) Penalty points (sec 9.5); 8) 12-point sending off offences
(R) Relegated

==== Results summary ====
Overall								Home						Away					
Pld	W	D	L	GF	GA	GD	Pts	W	D	L	GF	GA	GD	W	D	L	GF	GA	GD
46	11	20	15	45	53	−8	53	7	6	10	20	27	−7	4	14	5	25	26	−1

Last updated: 8 May 2021.
Source: BBC

==== Results by matchday ====
Matchday	1	2	3	4	5	6	7	8	9	10	11	12	13	14	15	16	17	18	19	20	21	22	23	24	25	26	27	28	29	30	31	32	33	34	35	36	37	38	39	40	41	42	43	44	45	46
Ground	H	A	A	H	H	H	A	A	H	A	H	H	A	A	H	A	H	A	H	A	H	A	H	A	A	H	H	A	H	H	A	A	H	A	A	A	A	H	A	H	H	A	H	A	H	A
Result	W	D	D	D	W	D	D	D	L	D	W	L	L	D	D	W	W	W	W	L	L	L	D	D	W	D	L	D	L	L	D	L	L	D	L	D	D	D	D	W	W	L	L	W	L	D
Position	7	10	13	12	7	10	10	12	14	15	12	13	15	16	16	14	11	11	8	9	11	11	11	12	10	11	12	14	15	17	15	18	19	19	20	20	20	20	20	20	18	19	19	19	19	19

Updated to match(es) played on 8 May 2021. Source: 11v11 for league tables and fixtures
A = Away; H = Home; W = Win; D = Draw; L = Loss

==== Matches ====
Win Draw Loss Postponed

The 2020–21 season fixtures were released on 21 August 2020.

12 September 2020 1	Walsall	1–0	Grimsby Town	Bescot
15:00 BST	Cockerill-Mollett (yellow card) 44'; Adebayo 60'	Report	Edwards (yellow card) 44'; Idehen (yellow card) 69'	Stadium: Bescot Stadium; Attendance: 0 Referee: Lee Swabey

19 September 2020 2	Harrogate Town	2–2	Walsall	Doncaster
15:00 BST	Martin 32'; Muldoon 42'; Fallowfield (yellow card) 90+3'	Report	Holden 4'; Guthrie (yellow card) 58' (yellow-red card) 86'; Gordon (penalty missed) 81' 81'	Stadium: Keepmoat Stadium; Attendance: 0 Referee: James Adcock

3 October 2020 3	Forest Green Rovers	1–1	Walsall	Nailsworth
15:00 BST	Matt 61'; Kitching (yellow card) 75'	Report	Lavery 14'; Holden (yellow card) 36'; Jules (yellow card) 77'	Stadium: The New Lawn; Attendance: 0 Referee: Antony Coggins

10 October 2020 4	Walsall	1–1	Colchester United	Bescot
15:00 BST	Norman (yellow card) 45'; Adebayo 53' (yellow card) 85'; Kinsella (yellow card) 90+1'	Report	Harriott 24'; Senior (yellow card) 45'; Norris (yellow card) 66'; Eastman (yellow card) 71'; Brown (yellow card) 76'	Stadium: Bescot Stadium; Attendance: 0 Referee: Declan Bourne

13 October 2020 5	Walsall	2–1	Leyton Orient	Bescot
19:00 BST	Holden 25' (yellow card) 89'; Lavery (penalty missed) 34'; Adebayo 61'; Guthrie (yellow card) 67'; Kinsella (yellow card) 79'; McDonald (yellow card) 90+4'; Osadebe (yellow card) 90+6'	Report	Johnson 15'; Widdowson (yellow card) 90+6'; Vigouroux (yellow card) 90+6'	Stadium: Bescot Stadium; Attendance: 0 Referee: Christopher Pollard

17 October 2020 6	Walsall	0–0	Exeter City	Bescot
15:00 BST		Report	Sweeney (yellow card) 61'	Stadium: Bescot Stadium; Attendance: 0 Referee: Ben Speedie

20 October 2020 7	Bradford City	1–1	Walsall	Bradford
19:45 BST	Wood (yellow card) 73'; Clarke 76' (pen.)	Report	Nurse 23'; White (yellow card) 77'	Stadium: Valley Parade; Attendance: 0 Referee: Andy Haines

24 October 2020 8	Barrow	2–2	Walsall	Barrow-in-Furness
15:00 BST	Jones (yellow card) 20'; Angus 25' (pen.) (yellow card) 26'; James 50'; Kay (yellow card) 57'	Report	Lavery 45+1', 58' (pen.) (yellow card) 63'; Jules (yellow card) 84'	Stadium: Holker Street; Attendance: 0 Referee: Bobby Madley

27 October 2020 9	Walsall	0–2	Cambridge United	Bescot
19:00 GMT	Kinsella (yellow card) 55'; McDonald (yellow card) 64'	Report	Mullin 9' (pen.); Boateng (yellow card) 23'; Ironside 80' (pen.)	Stadium: Bescot Stadium; Attendance: 0 Referee: Anthony Backhouse

31 October 2020 10	Mansfield Town	1–1	Walsall	Mansfield
15:00 GMT	Maynard 33' (yellow card) 80'; Perch (yellow card) 62'	Report	Adebayo 49'; White (yellow card) 50'; Lavery (yellow card) 90+2'	Stadium: Field Mill; Attendance: 0 Referee: Alan Young

3 November 2020 11	Walsall	1–0	Crawley Town	Bescot
19:00 GMT	Sadler (yellow card) 18' (goal) 74'; Holden (yellow card) 90+6'	Report	Nichols (yellow card) 38'	Stadium: Bescot Stadium; Attendance: 0 Referee: Sam Barrott

14 November 2020 12	Walsall	0–1	Southend United	Bescot
15:00 GMT	Bates (yellow card) 83' (yellow-red card) 90+3'	Report	Lennon (yellow card) 43'; Acquah 88'	Stadium: Bescot Stadium; Attendance: 0 Referee: Craig Hicks

21 November 2020 13	Cheltenham Town	3–0	Walsall	Cheltenham
15:00 GMT	Scarr 50' (o.g.); Blair 58'; May (yellow card) 86'; Tozer 88'	Report	Kinsella (yellow card) 10'; Holden (yellow card) 44'; Lavery (yellow card) 81'; Jules (yellow card) 86'	Stadium: Whaddon Road; Attendance: 0 Referee: Sam Purkiss

24 November 2020 14	Newport County	1–1	Walsall	Newport
19:00 GMT	Twine 23'; Cooper (yellow card) 27'; Demetriou (yellow card) 41'	Report	Adebayo 21'; Clarke (yellow card) 54'; Holden (yellow card) 88'	Stadium: Rodney Parade; Attendance: 0 Referee: Charles Breakspear

2 December 2020 15	Walsall	1–1	Stevenage	Bescot
19:00 GMT	Gordon 90+1' (pen.)	Report	Oteh 50' (pen.); Hutton (yellow card) 67'; Prosser (yellow card) 90+1'; Newton (yellow card) 90+3'	Stadium: Bescot Stadium; Attendance: 0 Referee: Marc Edwards

5 December 2020 16	Tranmere Rovers	1–3	Walsall	Birkenhead
15:00 GMT	Feeney 31'	Report	Adebayo 19'; McDonald 48'; Scarr 67'	Stadium: Prenton Park; Attendance: 2,000; Referee: Martin Coy

12 December 2020 17	Walsall	2–1	Bolton Wanderers	Bescot
15:00 GMT	Adebayo 44'; Holden 57'; Gordon (yellow card) 74'	Report	Doyle 13'; Delaney (yellow card) 56'; Santos (yellow card) 77'	Stadium: Bescot Stadium; Attendance: 0 Referee: Michael Salisbury

15 December 2020 18	Oldham Athletic	2–3	Walsall	Oldham
19:00 GMT	Piergianni (yellow card) 24' (goal) 68'; Fage 55'; Garrity (yellow card) 90+3'	Report	Gordon 23' (pen.); Piergianni 52' (o.g.); Adebayo 73'; Clarke (yellow card) 90+4'	Stadium: Boundary Park; Attendance: 0 Referee: James Bell

19 December 2020 19	Walsall	4–3	Port Vale	Bescot
15:00 GMT	Scrimshaw 52', 80'; Scarr 56', 82'; White (yellow card) 77'	Report	Joyce (yellow card) 16'; Mills (yellow card) 30'; Pope 37'; Conlon 44'; Rodney (yellow card) 45+1' (goal) 75'	Stadium: Bescot Stadium; Attendance: 0 Referee: Anthony Backhouse

26 December 2020 20	Salford City	2–0	Walsall	Salford
15:00 GMT	Wilson 16'; Hunter (yellow card) 49'; Touray (yellow card) 54'; Burgess 87'	Report		Stadium: Moor Lane; Attendance: 0 Referee: Scott Oldham

29 December 2020 21	Walsall	1–2	Scunthorpe United	Bescot
19:00 GMT	McDonald 55'; Gordon (penalty missed) 61'	Report	Loft (yellow card) 20'; Hippolyte 27'; Gilliead 69'	Stadium: Bescot Stadium; Attendance: 0 Referee: Trevor Kettle

2 January 2021 22	Walsall	0–2	Carlisle United	Bescot
15:00 GMT	Gordon (yellow card) 52'; Bates (yellow card) 59'	Report	Patrick 26'; Charters (yellow card) 27'; Armer (yellow card) 57'; Kayode 78'; Hayden (yellow card) 80'	Stadium: Bescot Stadium; Attendance: 0 Referee: James Oldham

16 January 2021 23	Walsall	1–1	Oldham Athletic	Bescot
15:00 GMT	Jules 45'; Scarr (yellow card) 71'	Report	Hamer (yellow card) 44'; Clarke (yellow card) 61'; Borthwick-Jackson (yellow card) 70'; Keillor-Dunn 75'	Stadium: Bescot Stadium; Attendance: 0 Referee: Christopher Pollard

19 January 2021 24	Morecambe	1–1	Walsall	Morecambe
19:00 GMT	Stockton (yellow card) 40'; Lavelle (yellow card) 79'; Mendes Gomes 80'; Hendrie (yellow card) 88' Derek Adams (red card)	Report	Gordon 37'; Jules (yellow card) 40'	Stadium: Globe Arena; Attendance: 0 Referee: Graham Salisbury

23 January 2021 25	Port Vale	1–3	Walsall	Burslem
15:00 GMT	Conlon 33', (yellow card) 60'; Smith (yellow card) 75'	Report	Adebayo 6', 55'; Fitzpatrick 68' (o.g.); Gordon (yellow card) 71'; Kinsella (yellow card) 79'	Stadium: Vale Park; Attendance: 0 Referee: Lee Swabey

9 February 2021 26	Walsall	1–1	Mansfield Town	Bescot
18:45 GMT	Melbourne 23'; Wright (yellow card) 29'; Kinsella (yellow card) 61'	Report	Quinn (yellow card) 26'; Clarke 31'; Gordon (yellow card) 86'	Stadium: Bescot Stadium; Attendance: 0 Referee: Alan Young

16 February 2021 27	Walsall	1–2	Cheltenham Town	Bescot
19:00 GMT	Lavery 3'; Norman (yellow card) 75'; Bates (yellow card) 79'	Report	Smith 35'; Wright 43'	Stadium: Bescot Stadium; Attendance: 0 Referee: David Webb

20 February 2021 28	Stevenage	1–1	Walsall	Stevenage
15:00 GMT	List 70'; Vancooten (yellow card) 72'	Report	Lavery 1'; Kinsella (red card) 56'; White (yellow card) 66'	Stadium: Broadhall Way; Attendance: 0 Referee: Antony Coggins

24 February 2021 29	Walsall	0–1	Newport County	Bescot
17:30 GMT	Gordon (yellow card) 8'; Vincent (yellow card) 53'	Report	Labadie 71'	Stadium: Bescot Stadium; Attendance: 0 Referee: Sam Allison

27 February 2021 30	Walsall	1–2	Bradford City	Bescot
15:00 GMT	Perry (yellow card) 4'; White (yellow card) 53'; Gordon (yellow card) 69'; Scarr 77'	Report	O'Connor (yellow card) 19'; Sutton 43'; Cook 66'	Stadium: Bescot Stadium; Attendance: 0 Referee: Scott Oldham

2 March 2021 31	Exeter City	0–0	Walsall	Exeter
19:00 GMT	McArdle (yellow card) 63'	Report	Melbourne (yellow card) 49'	Stadium: St James Park; Attendance: 0 Referee: John Busby

6 March 2021 32	Cambridge United	1–0	Walsall	Cambridge
15:00 GMT	Mullin 90+4'	Report		Stadium: Abbey Stadium; Attendance: 0 Referee: Ben Toner

12 March 2021 33	Walsall	0–1	Barrow	Bescot
19:00 GMT	Scarr (yellow card) 29'; Osadebe (yellow card) 45'; Sadler (yellow card) 80'	Report	Kay 87'; Quigley (yellow card) 90+4'	Stadium: Bescot Stadium; Attendance: 0 Referee: Carl Brook

16 March 2021 34	Crawley Town	1–1	Walsall	Crawley
19:00 GMT	Tunnicliffe (yellow card) 55'; McNerney (yellow card) 63'; Tsaroulla (yellow card) 90+1'; Nichols 90+7' (pen.)	Report	Clarke (yellow card) 40'; Osadebe 55' (pen.); Roberts (yellow card) 90+6'	Stadium: Broadfield Stadium; Attendance: 0 Referee: Tim Robinson

20 March 2021 35	Bolton Wanderers	2–1	Walsall	Horwich
15:00 GMT	Lee 67'; Doyle 80' (pen.); John (yellow card) 86'	Report	Perry 28'; Clarke (yellow card) 45'; White (red card) 73'; Norman (yellow card) 90+2'	Stadium: University of Bolton Stadium; Attendance: 0 Referee: Seb Stockbridge

23 March 2021 36	Southend United	0–0	Walsall	Southend-on-Sea
19:00 GMT	McCormack (yellow card) 4'; White (yellow card) 36'; Hart (red card) 67'	Report	Gordon (yellow card) 31'; Lavery (yellow card) 36'; Clarke (yellow card) 82'; Leak (yellow card) 83'; Osei (yellow card) 90'	Stadium: Roots Hall; Attendance: 0 Referee: David Rock

27 March 2021 37	Grimsby Town	1–1	Walsall	Cleethorpes
15:00 GMT	Hanson 9'; Payne (yellow card) 12'	Report	Lavery 45+1'; Clarke (yellow card) 88'	Stadium: Blundell Park; Attendance: 0 Referee: Sam Barrott

2 April 2021 38	Walsall	0–0	Harrogate Town	Bescot
15:00 BST		Report		Stadium: Bescot Stadium; Attendance: 0 Referee: Will Finnie

5 April 2021 39	Leyton Orient	0–0	Walsall	Leyton
15:00 BST	Widdowson (yellow card) 52'; Wilkinson (yellow card) 90+2'	Report	Melbourne (yellow card) 23'	Stadium: Brisbane Road; Attendance: 0 Referee: Paul Howard

10 April 2021 40	Walsall	2–1	Forest Green Rovers	Bescot
15:00 BST	Holden 6'; Clarke 65', (yellow card) 86'; Gordon (yellow card) 78'; Sadler (yellow card) 90+6'	Report	Cargill (yellow card) 60'; Bailey (yellow card) 70'; Moore-Taylor 72'	Stadium: Bescot Stadium; Attendance: 0 Referee: Ross Joyce

13 April 2021 41	Walsall	1–0	Tranmere Rovers	Bescot
19:00 BST	Osadebe 70'	Report	Spearing (yellow card) 49' (yellow-red card) 74'; Lewis (yellow card) 78'; Vaughan (yellow card) 90+4'	Stadium: Bescot Stadium; Attendance: 0 Referee: Ollie Yates

17 April 2021 42	Colchester United	2–1	Walsall	Colchester
17:30 BST	Pell (yellow card) 27'; Folivi 37'; Clampin 45+4'; Sarpong-Wiredu (yellow card) 50'; George (yellow card) 62'	Report	Clarke 20'; Wright (yellow card) 45+1'	Stadium: Colchester Community Stadium; Attendance: 0 Referee: Carl Boyeson

20 April 2021 43	Walsall	0–2	Salford City	Bescot
19:00 BST		Report	Henderson 19'; Turnbull 57'; Gotts (yellow card) 90+5'; Thomas-Asante (yellow card) 90+5'	Stadium: Bescot Stadium; Attendance: 0 Referee: Peter Wright

24 April 2021 44	Scunthorpe United	0–2	Walsall	Scunthorpe
15:00 BST	Beestin (yellow card) 67'	Report	Osadebe 13'; Gordon 23'; Clarke (yellow card) 90+1'	Stadium: Glanford Park; Attendance: 0 Referee: James Adcock

1 May 2021 45	Walsall	0–2	Morecambe	Bescot
15:00 BST		Report	Stockton 45+2'; Songo'o (yellow card) 58', (goal) 76'	Stadium: Bescot Stadium; Attendance: 0 Referee: Lee Swabey

8 May 2021 46	Carlisle United	0–0	Walsall	Carlisle
15:00 BST		Report		Stadium: Brunton Park; Attendance: 0 Referee: Marc Edwards

=== FA Cup ===
The draw for the first round was made on Monday 26, October.

Win Draw Loss

7 November 2020 First round	Walsall	1–2	Bristol Rovers	Bescot
15:00 GMT	Jules (yellow card) 4'; Bates (yellow card) 47'; Lavery 87'	Report	Baldwin 33'; Hanlan 39'; Kilgour (yellow card) 47'; Jaakkola (yellow card) 90+4'	Stadium: Bescot Stadium; Attendance: 0 Referee: Ross Joyce

=== EFL Cup ===
Win Draw Loss

The first round draw was made on 18 August, live on Sky Sports, by Paul Merson.

5 September 2020 First round	Walsall	0–0 (2–4 p)	Sheffield Wednesday	Bescot
14:15 BST		Report	Bannan (yellow card) 40'; Börner (yellow card) 55'	Stadium: Bescot Stadium; Attendance: 0 Referee: Peter Wright
	Penalties
	Holden (penalty scored); Gordon (penalty missed); Adebayo (penalty scored); Bates (penalty missed)		Bannan (penalty scored); Windass (penalty scored); Harris (penalty scored); Brown (penalty scored)

=== EFL Trophy ===
Win Draw Loss

The regional group stage draw was confirmed on 18 August.

Pos	Div	Team	Pld	W	PW	PL	L	GF	GA	GD	Pts	Qualification
1	L1	Oxford United	3	2	1	0	0	4	2	+2	8	Advance to Round 2
2	L1	Bristol Rovers	3	1	0	2	0	7	6	+1	5	Advance to Round 2
3	L2	Walsall	3	0	1	1	1	3	4	−1	3	
4	ACA	Chelsea U21	3	0	1	0	2	5	7	−2	2	

Source: EFL.com

8 September 2020 Group stage	Bristol Rovers	2–2 (2–4 p)	Walsall	Horfield
19:45 BST	Mehew 16' (yellow card) 60'; Baldwin (yellow card) 33'; Ayunga 71'; Kelly (yellow card) 82'	Report	Jules 29'; Nurse (yellow card) 32'; Kinsella (yellow card) 37'; Osadebe (yellow card) 57'; Gordon 64'	Stadium: Memorial Stadium; Attendance: 0 Referee: Brett Huxtable
	Penalties
	Kelly (penalty missed); Harries (penalty missed); Hare (penalty scored); Ayunga (penalty scored)		Norman (penalty scored); McDonald (penalty scored); Holden (penalty missed); Lavery (penalty scored); Gordon (penalty scored)

29 September 2020 Group stage	Walsall	1–1 (3–5 p)	Chelsea U21	Bescot
19:00 BST	Nurse (yellow card) 32'; McDonald 53'	Report	Nunn (yellow card) 33'; Simeu 69'	Stadium: Bescot Stadium; Attendance: 0 Referee: Brett Huxtable
	Penalties
	Norman (penalty missed); Holden (penalty scored); Adebayo (penalty scored); Lavery (penalty scored)		Russell (penalty scored); Fiabema (penalty scored); Ballo (penalty scored); Simeu (penalty scored); Maatsen (penalty scored)

10 November 2020 Group stage	Walsall	0–1	Oxford United	Bescot
19:00 GMT	Cockerill-Mollett (yellow card) 55'; Osadebe (yellow card) 76'	Report	Cooper (yellow card) 35'; Osei 87'	Stadium: Bescot Stadium; Attendance: 0 Referee: Carl Brook
