= Joe Willis (English footballer) =

English footballer

Personal information
- Full name: Joseph Alan Willis
- Date of birth: 3 October 2001 (age 25)
- Place of birth: Walsall, England
- Height: 5 ft 11 in (1.80 m)
- Position: Midfielder

Team information
- Current team: Hereford
- Number: 6

Youth career
- –2019: Walsall

Senior career*
| Years | Team | Apps | (Gls) |
| 2019–2022 | Walsall | 2 | (0) |
| 2020 | → Salisbury (loan) | 2 | (0) |
| 2021 | → Leamington (loan) | 4 | (0) |
| 2021–2022 | → Bromsgrove Sporting (loan) | 26 | (0) |
| 2022–2024 | Stafford Rangers | 72 | (1) |
| 2024–2026 | Alvechurch | 73 | (6) |
| 2026– | Hereford | 3 | (0) |
- * Club domestic league appearances and goals as of 20:16, 21 November 2026 (UTC)

Joseph Alan Willis (born 3 October 2001) is an English footballer who plays as a midfielder for National League North club Hereford.

== Career ==
=== Early career ===
Born in Walsall, Willis started his career at Walsall and made his debut for the club on 7 January 2020, coming on as a second-half substitute in a 2–1 EFL Trophy defeat at home to Portsmouth. On 13 February 2020, he joined Salisbury on a one-month loan, and made two appearances for the club. He was offered his first professional contract for Walsall in May 2020, and signed his first professional contract with the club in July 2020. He made his league debut for Walsall on 24 April 2021 as a late substitute in a 2–0 victory away to Scunthorpe United, and made his second appearance of the season as a substitute in the final match of the season against Carlisle United.

In October 2021, Willis joined National League North side Leamington on a month-long youth loan. On 19 November 2021, Willis was recalled from his loan spell by parent club Walsall. On the same day Willis was loaned out to Southern League Premier Central side Bromsgrove Sporting. Willis made a total of 26 appearances whilst on loan with Bromsgrove Sporting.

=== Non-League career ===
Willis was released by Walsall at the end of the 2021–22 season. Upon his release, Willis joined Northern Premier League Premier Division club Stafford Rangers, spending two seasons with the club before joining Southern League Premier Division Central club Alvechurch in summer 2024.

On 2 June 2026, Willis signed for National League North club Hereford.

== Career statistics ==
As of match played 21 November 2026

Appearances and goals by club, season and competition
| Club | Season | League | | | FA Cup | | EFL Cup | | Other | | Total | |
| Club | Season | Division | Apps | Goals | Apps | Goals | Apps | Goals | Apps | Goals | Apps | Goals |
|---|---|---|---|---|---|---|---|---|---|---|---|---|
| Walsall | 2019–20 | League Two | 0 | 0 | 0 | 0 | 0 | 0 | 1 (Note: Appearance in EFL Trophy) | 0 | 1 | 0 |
| Walsall | 2020–21 | League Two | 2 | 0 | 0 | 0 | 0 | 0 | 0 | 0 | 2 | 0 |
| Walsall | 2021–22 | League Two | 0 | 0 | 0 | 0 | 0 | 0 | 1 | 0 | 1 | 0 |
| Walsall | Total | | 2 | 0 | 0 | 0 | 0 | 0 | 2 | 0 | 4 | 0 |
| Salisbury (loan) | 2019–20 | SL Premier Division South | 2 | 0 | 0 | 0 | — | | 0 | 0 | 2 | 0 |
| Leamington (loan) | 2021–22 | National League North | 4 | 0 | 0 | 0 | — | | 0 | 0 | 4 | 0 |
| Bromsgrove Sporting (loan) | 2021–22 | SL Premier Division Central | 26 | 0 | 0 | 0 | — | | 1 (Note: Appearance in Southern League Cup) | 0 | 27 | 0 |
| Stafford Rangers | 2022–23 | NPL Premier Division | 32 | 0 | 0 | 0 | — | | 3 (Note: One appearance in FA Trophy; two appearances in Staffordshire Senior Cup) | 0 | 35 | 0 |
| Stafford Rangers | 2023–24 | NPL Premier Division | 40 | 1 | 2 | 0 | — | | 3 (Note: Appearance(s) in FA Trophy) | 0 | 45 | 1 |
| Stafford Rangers | Total | | 72 | 1 | 2 | 0 | 0 | 0 | 6 | 0 | 80 | 1 |
| Alvechurch | 2024–25 | SL Premier Division Central | 41 | 5 | 1 | 0 | — | | 7 (Note: Three appearances in FA Trophy; one appearance in Birmingham Senior Cup; three appearances, one goal in Worcestershire Senior Cup) | 1 | 49 | 6 |
| Alvechurch | 2025–26 | SL Premier Division Central | 32 | 1 | 1 | 0 | — | | 6 (Note: Four appearances in FA Trophy, one appearance in Birmingham Senior Cup, one appearance in Worcestershire Senior Cup) | 0 | 39 | 1 |
| Alvechurch | Total | | 73 | 6 | 2 | 0 | 0 | 0 | 13 | 1 | 88 | 7 |
| Hereford | 2026–27 | National League North | 3 | 0 | 0 | 0 | — | | 1 | 0 | 4 | 0 |
| Career total | | | 182 | 7 | 4 | 0 | 0 | 0 | 23 | 1 | 209 | 8 |
