= Sam Perry (footballer) =

English footballer

Personal information
- Full name: Samuel Paul Perry
- Date of birth: 29 December 2001 (age 24)
- Place of birth: Walsall, England
- Height: 6 ft 0 in (1.84 m)
- Position: Midfielder

Team information
- Current team: Alvechurch

Youth career
- –2019: Aston Villa
- 2019–2020: Walsall

Senior career*
Years	Team	Apps	(Gls)
2020–2023	Walsall	36	(2)
2022–2023	→ Yeovil Town (loan)	12	(0)
2023	→ Leamington (loan)	20	(0)
2023	Waterford	14	(1)
2023–2024	Salisbury	8	(1)
2024	Macclesfield	11	(1)
2024–	Alvechurch	0	(0)
- * Club domestic league appearances and goals as of 12:23, 29 May 2024 (UTC)

Samuel Paul Perry (born 29 December 2001) is an English professional footballer who plays as a midfielder for Southern League Premier Division Central club Alvechurch.

== Career ==
Born in Walsall, Perry started his career at the academy of Aston Villa before joining Walsall in 2019. He made his debut for Walsall on 7 January 2020 in a 2–1 EFL Trophy defeat at home to Portsmouth. He was offered his first professional contract in May 2020, which he signed in July of that year. He made his league debut for Walsall on 27 February 2021, starting in a 2–1 League Two defeat at home to Bradford City. He scored the first goal of his career the following month with a weak-footed half-volley into the bottom right corner in the 28th minute of a 2–1 defeat away to Bolton Wanderers on 20 March 2021. On 12 April 2021, he signed a new contract with the club of undisclosed length. He made 16 appearances across the 2020–21 season, scoring one goal.

On 12 July 2022, Perry joined National League side Yeovil Town on loan until the end of the 2022–23 season.

On 3 February 2023, Perry joined National League North side Leamington on loan until the end of the 2022–23 season.

On 4 July 2023, Perry signed for League of Ireland First Division side Waterford. In December 2023, he returned to England with Salisbury. In February 2024, he joined Northern Premier League Premier Division club Macclesfield.

In May 2024, Perry joined Southern Premier Division Central club Alvechurch.

== Career statistics ==
As of match played 29 April 2023

Appearances and goals by club, season and competition
Club	Season	League			FA Cup		EFL Cup		Other		Total	
Club	Season	Division	Apps	Goals	Apps	Goals	Apps	Goals	Apps	Goals	Apps	Goals
Walsall	2019–20	League Two	0	0	0	0	0	0	1 (Note: Appearance(s) in EFL Trophy)	0	1	0
Walsall	2020–21	League Two	16	1	0	0	0	0	0	0	16	1
Walsall	2021–22	League Two	20	1	1	0	0	0	4	0	25	1
Walsall	2022–23	League Two	0	0	0	0	0	0	0	0	0	0
Walsall	Total		36	2	1	0	0	0	5	0	42	2
Yeovil Town (loan)	2022–23	National League	12	0	1	0	—		0	0	13	0
Leamington (loan)	2022–23	National League North	20	0	—		—		—		20	0
Career total			68	2	2	0	0	0	5	0	75	2
