= Liam Kinsella =

Footballer (born 1996)

Personal information
- Full name: Liam Mark Kinsella
- Date of birth: 23 February 1996 (age 30)
- Place of birth: Colchester, England
- Height: 1.75 m (5 ft 9 in)
- Position: Midfielder

Team information
- Current team: Hednesford Town
- Number: 16

Youth career
- 2004–2014: Walsall

Senior career*
Years	Team	Apps	(Gls)
2014–2023	Walsall	212	(2)
2023–2024	Swindon Town	22	(0)
2024–2026	Cheltenham Town	78	(0)
2026–	Hednesford Town	10	(0)

International career^{‡}
2015	Republic of Ireland U19	2	(0)
2017–2018	Republic of Ireland U21	5	(0)
- * Club domestic league appearances and goals as of 20:39, 30 September 2026 (UTC) ‡ National team caps and goals as of 00:00, 28 December 2016 (UTC)

Liam Mark Kinsella (born 23 February 1996) is a professional footballer who plays as a midfielder for National League North club Hednesford Town. He has represented the Republic of Ireland at U19 level and U21 level.

== Club career ==
=== Walsall ===
Kinsella signed for Walsall as an eight-year-old and worked his way through various youth levels before signing his first professional contract in March 2014. He made his senior debut against Bradford City on 16 August 2014, and was named man of the match in a 0–0 draw.

He scored his first senior goal in a 2–0 win over Burton Albion in October 2015, to help Walsall leapfrog the Brewers to the top of the League One table. Kinsella described the goal as "one of the best moments of my career so far".

He was offered a new contract by Walsall at the end of the 2018–19 season. In January 2021, he signed a new two-year contract.

Kinsella was named as the club's Player of the Season in 2020–21 and 2021–22.

He departed the club upon the expiration of his contract at the end of the 2022–23 season.

=== Swindon Town ===
Kinsella signed for Swindon Town on 28 July 2023, linking up again his former manager at Walsall, Michael Flynn.

=== Cheltenham Town ===
On 24 January 2024, Kinsella joined League One club Cheltenham Town on an eighteen-month contract, reuniting with former Walsall manager Darrell Clarke.

On 2 June 2025, Kinsella signed a new one-year contract at Cheltenham, with the option of an additional year.

On 22 January 2026, Kinsella departed the club by mutual consent.

=== Hednesford Town ===
On 22 January 2026, Kinsella joined Northern Premier League Premier Division club Hednesford Town.

== International career ==
Kinsella made his Republic of Ireland U19s debut on 25 February 2015, in a friendly match against Azerbaijan Under 19s. He was named in the starting eleven for the match at Tallaght Stadium. His second appearance came just two days later in a 2–0 win against the same opposition at the same venue.

He earned his first call-up to the Republic of Ireland U21s in September 2016, and made his debut 12 months later against Azerbaijan U21s.

== Personal life ==
His father is former Republic of Ireland international footballer Mark Kinsella. His younger sister is Olympic gymnastics bronze medallist, Alice Kinsella.

== Career statistics ==
As of match played 26 September 2026

Appearances and goals by club, season and competition
Club	Season	League			FA Cup		League Cup		Other		Total	
Club	Season	Division	Apps	Goals	Apps	Goals	Apps	Goals	Apps	Goals	Apps	Goals
Walsall	2014–15	League One	4	0	0	0	1	0	0	0	5	0
Walsall	2015–16	League One	7	1	1	0	0	0	1 (Note: Appearance(s) in Football League Trophy/EFL Trophy)	0	9	1
Walsall	2016–17	League One	8	0	0	0	1	0	3	0	12	0
Walsall	2017–18	League One	19	0	1	0	1	0	3	0	24	0
Walsall	2018–19	League One	31	0	4	1	2	0	2	0	39	1
Walsall	2019–20	League Two	31	0	3	0	1	0	5	1	40	1
Walsall	2020–21	League Two	43	0	1	0	1	0	1	0	46	0
Walsall	2021–22	League Two	32	0	1	0	1	0	1	0	35	0
Walsall	2022–23	League Two	37	1	3	0	1	0	2	0	43	1
Walsall	Total		212	2	14	1	9	0	18	1	253	4
Swindon Town	2023–24	League Two	22	0	1	0	1	0	3	0	27	0
Cheltenham Town	2023–24	League One	20	0	0	0	0	0	0	0	20	0
Cheltenham Town	2024–25	League Two	37	0	2	0	0	0	4	0	43	0
Cheltenham Town	2025–26	League Two	21	0	2	0	1	0	2	0	26	0
Cheltenham Town	Total		78	0	4	0	1	0	6	0	89	0
Hednesford Town	2025–26	Northern Premier League Premier Division	?	?	?	?	—		?	?	?	?
Hednesford Town	2026–27	National League North	10	0	0	0	—		0	0	10	0
Career total			322	2	19	1	11	0	27	1	379	4

== Honours ==
Hednesford Town

- Northern Premier League Play Offs: 2025-26

Individual

- Walsall Player of the Year: 2020–21, 2021–22
