= James Clarke (footballer, born 1989) =

English footballer (born 1989)

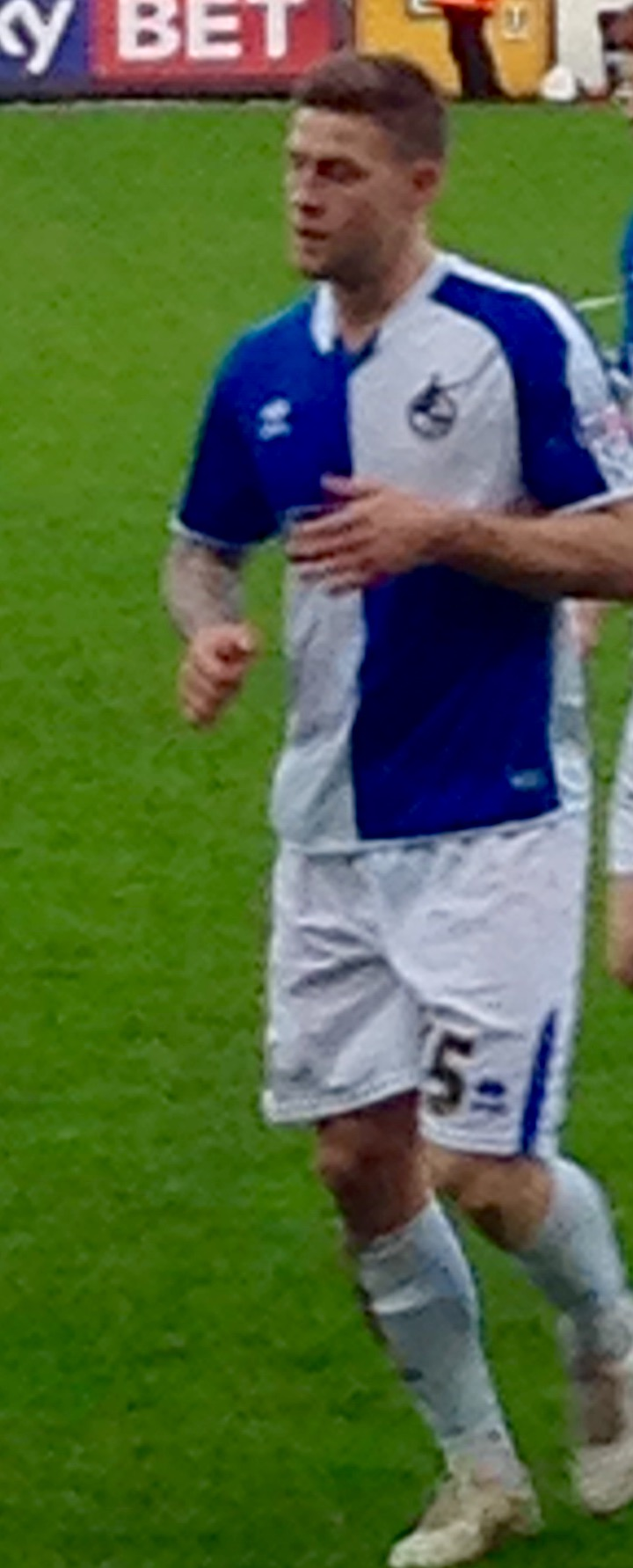
- Clarke playing for Bristol Rovers in 2015

Personal information
- Full name: James Anthony John Clarke
- Date of birth: 17 November 1989 (age 36)
- Place of birth: Aylesbury, England
- Height: 6 ft 0 in (1.83 m)
- Position: Defender

Team information
- Current team: Cardiff Met (player-coach)
- Number: 5

Youth career
- 2000–2006: Watford

Senior career*
| Years | Team | Apps | (Gls) |
| 2007–2009 | Oxford United | 32 | (0) |
| 2009–2012 | Oxford City | 151 | (0) |
| 2012–2014 | Salisbury City | 74 | (0) |
| 2014–2015 | Woking | 30 | (0) |
| 2015–2019 | Bristol Rovers | 112 | (2) |
| 2019–2021 | Walsall | 58 | (5) |
| 2021–2026 | Newport County | 119 | (2) |
| 2026– | Cardiff Met | 14 | (2) |
- * Club domestic league appearances and goals as of 07:50, 8 November 2026 (UTC)

James Anthony John Clarke (born 17 November 1989) is an English footballer who plays as a centre back for Cymru Premier club Cardiff Met, where he is player-coach.

== Career ==
Clarke began his career at Oxford United, making his debut by playing the full 90 minutes in a 2–0 Conference win at Kidderminster Harriers on 24 November 2007. He made 18 league appearances in his first season, and was sent off for two bookings in a 0–3 home defeat to Burton Albion on 8 March 2008.

He played 14 league matches in the ensuing campaign, but received a straight red card in the opening game, a 3–0 defeat at Barrow on 8 August 2008. On 27 February 2009, with his contract terminated by mutual consent, he joined Southern Football League Premier Division team Oxford City for the rest of their 2009 campaign, and from 2012 to 2014 he signed for Salisbury City after an unsuccessful trial at League one side Yeovil Town.

With Salisbury in financial distress, Clarke left for Woking, also of the Conference, on an undisclosed contract. He made his debut on 9 August as they opened the season with a 3–1 win at Alfreton Town, and made 30 appearances across the campaign.

=== Bristol Rovers ===
On 11 June 2015, with his contract expired, he signed for Bristol Rovers, newly promoted back into The Football League. He made his debut for the club on 8 August, as they began the League Two season with a 0–1 home defeat to Northampton Town. Clarke ended the season with several first-team appearances as he provided a helpful role in Rovers' 3rd-place finish to achieve promotion into the Football League One. In the same summer, Clarke signed a contract extension along with several other teammates.

Clarke scored his first professional goal in a 2–1 victory over Wycombe Wanderers at the start of the 2018–19 season and his second with a 95-minute winner in a 2–1 victory over Fleetwood Town.

=== Walsall ===
Clarke was offered a new contract at Bristol Rovers at the end of the 2018–19 season but, despite being offered an improved two-year contract, opted to follow former boss Darrell Clarke to Walsall (under whom he had worked at Salisbury and Rovers) on a deal worth £104,000 per year. Clarke made his debut on the opening day of the season, scoring the only goal as Darrell Clarke got off to a winning start against Northampton Town. His impressive start with the club continued and after scoring two goals in the month, he was awarded the League Two Player of the Month award for September 2019. One of these goals was a 30-yard screamer against Crawley Town that won him the league's Goal of the Month award.

At the end of the 2020–21 season, Clarke was one of eight players to not be offered a new contract and departed the club at the expiration of his contract.

=== Newport County ===
In June 2021 he joined Newport County on a one-year deal. He made his debut for Newport on 7 August 2021 as a first-half substitute in the 1–0 League Two win against Oldham Athletic. On 18 September 2021, Clarke scored his first goal for the club with an 87th-minute winner against former club Walsall, assisted by another former Walsall teammate Cameron Norman. In May 2022 Clarke's contract at Newport was extended until the end of the 2022–23 season. He signed a new two-year contract in May 2023. In June 2025 Clarke extended his Newport contract for a further year.

On 22 January 2026, Clarke announced his retirement with immediate effect.

=== Cardiff Met ===
On 16 February it was announced he had joined Cardiff Met on an 18 month deal as player-coach.

== Personal life ==
Clarke suffers from a severe nut allergy. During a fixture against Bury in 2017 whilst playing for Bristol Rovers, he suffered a severe allergic reaction that left him struggling to breathe.

== Career statistics ==
As of 22 January 2026

Appearances and goals by club, season and competition
| Club | Season | League | | | FA Cup | | League Cup | | Other | | Total | |
| Club | Season | Division | Apps | Goals | Apps | Goals | Apps | Goals | Apps | Goals | Apps | Goals |
|---|---|---|---|---|---|---|---|---|---|---|---|---|
| Oxford United | 2007–08 | Conference Premier | 18 | 0 | 2 | 0 | — | | 0 | 0 | 20 | 0 |
| Oxford United | 2008–09 | Conference Premier | 14 | 0 | 2 | 0 | — | | 0 | 0 | 16 | 0 |
| Oxford United | Total | | 32 | 0 | 4 | 0 | — | | 0 | 0 | 36 | 0 |
| Oxford City | Total | | 151 | 0 | — | | — | | — | | 151 | 0 |
| Salisbury City | 2012–13 | Conference South | 37 | 0 | 0 | 0 | — | | 3 (Note: One appearance in FA Trophy, two appearances in Conference South play-offs) | 0 | 40 | 0 |
| Salisbury City | 2013–14 | Conference Premier | 37 | 0 | 3 | 0 | — | | 1 (Note: Appearances in FA Trophy) | 0 | 41 | 0 |
| Salisbury City | Total | | 74 | 0 | 3 | 0 | — | | 4 | 0 | 82 | 0 |
| Woking | 2014–15 | Conference Premier | 30 | 0 | 2 | 0 | — | | 5 | 0 | 37 | 0 |
| Bristol Rovers | 2015–16 | League Two | 37 | 0 | 1 | 0 | 1 | 0 | 1 (Note: Appearance in Football League Trophy) | 0 | 40 | 0 |
| Bristol Rovers | 2016–17 | League One | 22 | 0 | 1 | 0 | 1 | 0 | 2 (Note: Appearances in EFL Trophy) | 0 | 26 | 0 |
| Bristol Rovers | 2017–18 | League One | 11 | 0 | 0 | 0 | 0 | 0 | 0 | 0 | 11 | 0 |
| Bristol Rovers | 2018–19 | League One | 42 | 2 | 2 | 0 | 2 | 0 | 3 | 0 | 49 | 2 |
| Bristol Rovers | Total | | 112 | 2 | 4 | 0 | 4 | 0 | 6 | 0 | 126 | 2 |
| Walsall | 2019–20 | League Two | 27 | 3 | 2 | 0 | 1 | 0 | 2 | 0 | 32 | 3 |
| Walsall | 2020–21 | League Two | 31 | 2 | 0 | 0 | 1 | 0 | 1 | 0 | 33 | 2 |
| Walsall | Total | | 58 | 5 | 2 | 0 | 2 | 0 | 3 | 0 | 65 | 5 |
| Newport County | 2021–22 | League Two | 35 | 1 | 1 | 0 | 2 | 0 | 0 | 0 | 38 | 1 |
| Newport County | 2022–23 | League Two | 23 | 0 | 1 | 0 | 0 | 0 | 2 | 0 | 26 | 0 |
| Newport County | 2023–24 | League Two | 25 | 0 | 5 | 2 | 1 | 0 | 1 | 0 | 32 | 2 |
| Newport County | 2024–25 | League Two | 24 | 1 | 0 | 0 | 1 | 1 | 1 | 0 | 26 | 2 |
| Newport County | 2025–26 | League Two | 12 | 0 | 1 | 0 | 2 | 0 | 1 | 0 | 16 | 0 |
| Newport County | Total | | 119 | 2 | 8 | 2 | 6 | 1 | 5 | 0 | 138 | 5 |
| Career total | | | 576 | 9 | 23 | 2 | 12 | 1 | 23 | 0 | 634 | 12 |

== Honours ==
Individual

- EFL League Two Player of the Month: September 2019
