= Alfie Bates =

English footballer

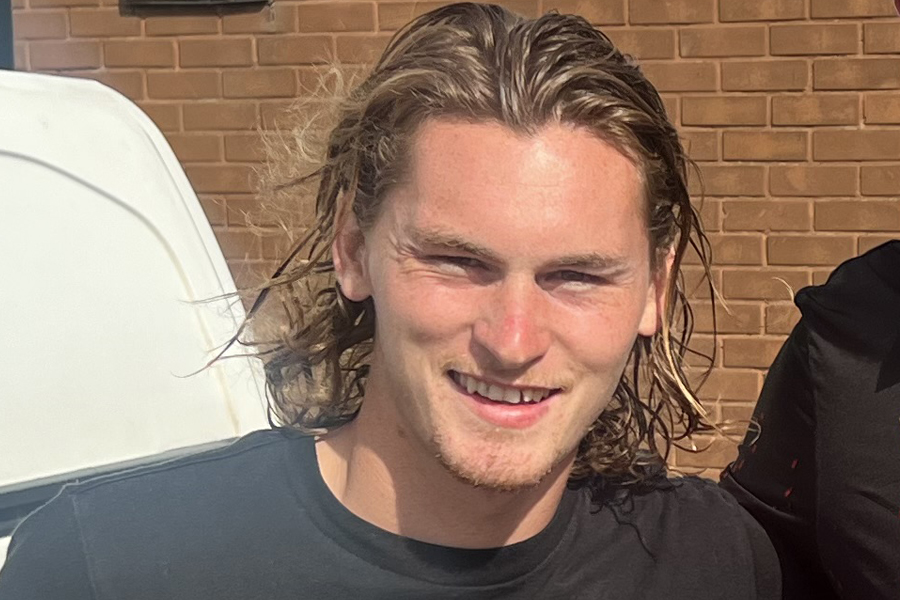
- Bates in July 2025

Personal information
- Full name: Alfie Bates
- Date of birth: 3 May 2001 (age 25)
- Place of birth: Coventry, England
- Height: 1.70 m (5 ft 7 in)
- Position: Midfielder

Team information
- Current team: Drogheda United
- Number: 15

Youth career
- Coundon Court Juniors
- 2008: Coventry City
- 2008–2016: Birmingham City
- 2017–2018: Walsall

Senior career*
Years	Team	Apps	(Gls)
2018–2022	Walsall	49	(1)
2022	SJK	13	(0)
2022	SJK Akatemia	1	(0)
2023–2025	Brackley Town	89	(5)
2025–2026	Tamworth	37	(1)
2026–	Drogheda United	11	(0)
- * Club domestic league appearances and goals as of 18:11, 10 November 2026 (UTC)

Alfie Bates (born 3 May 2001) is an English professional footballer who plays as a midfielder for League of Ireland First Division club Drogheda United.

== Career ==
Bates was born in Coventry and joined the Academy at Coventry City at the age of seven after leaving Coundon Court Juniors. He went on to endure a difficult start to his career, losing his mother to cancer in 2013 and then being released by Birmingham City at the age of 15. He signed for Walsall in March 2017 and scored on his youth-team debut against Morecambe, before featuring in 28 under-18 and six Development Squad matches during the 2017–18 season. He made his first-team debut for the "Saddlers" on 9 October 2018, in a 3–1 victory over Middlesbrough U21 in an EFL Trophy group stage match at the Bescot Stadium.

On 23 February 2022, Bates joined Veikkausliiga club SJK on a long-term deal. In December 2022, he terminated his contract in order to return to England. On 12 January 2023, Bates joined National League North side Brackley Town.

In June 2025, Bates joined National League side Tamworth.

On 24 July 2026, Bates signed for League of Ireland Premier Division club Drogheda United until the end of their season in November. He made 14 appearances in all competitions by the end of the season, as the club was relegated following a 2–1 defeat to UCD in the Promotion/Relegation Playoff.

== Career statistics ==
As of match played on 7 November 2026

Appearances and goals by club, season and competition
Club	Season	League			National Cup		League Cup		Other		Total	
Club	Season	Division	Apps	Goals	Apps	Goals	Apps	Goals	Apps	Goals	Apps	Goals
Walsall	2018–19	League One	0	0	0	0	0	0	2 (Note: Appearances in EFL Trophy)	0	2	0
Walsall	2019–20	League Two	13	1	3	1	1	0	4	0	21	2
Walsall	2020–21	League Two	36	0	1	0	1	0	3	0	41	0
Walsall	2021–22	League Two	0	0	0	0	0	0	4	0	4	0
Walsall	Total		49	1	4	1	2	0	13	0	68	2
SJK	2022	Veikkausliiga	13	0	0	0	2	0	2 (Note: Appearances in UEFA Europa Conference League)	0	17	0
SJK Akatemia	2022	Ykkönen	1	0	0	0	—		0	0	1	0
Brackley Town	2022–23	National League North	16	2	0	0	—		3 (Note: Appearance(s) in National League North play-offs)	0	19	2
Brackley Town	2023–24	National League North	31	2	3	0	—		1	0	35	2
Brackley Town	2024–25	National League North	42	1	6	0	—		1 (Note: Appearance(s) in FA Trophy)	0	49	1
Brackley Town	Total		89	5	9	0	0	0	5	0	103	5
Tamworth	2025–26	National League	37	1	1	0	4	1	0	0	42	2
Drogheda United	2026	LOI Premier Division	11	0	2	0	—		1 (Note: Appearance in the 2026 League of Ireland play-offs)	0	14	0
Career total			200	7	16	1	8	1	21	0	245	9

== Honours ==
Brackley Town:

- National League North: 2024–25
