= Caolan Lavery =

Canadian-born Northern Irish footballer

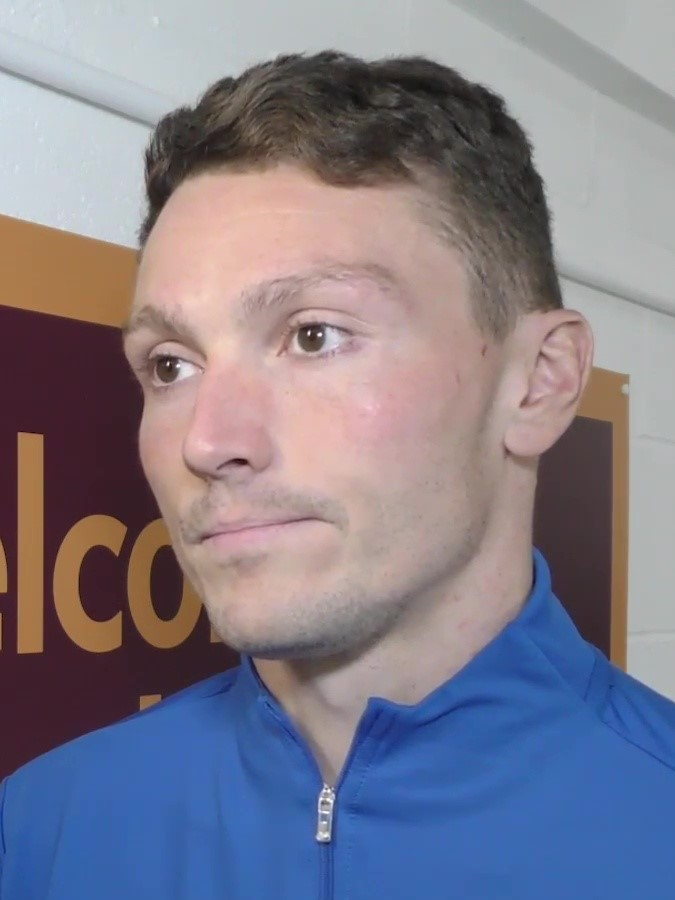

Personal information
- Full name: Caolan Owen Lavery
- Date of birth: 22 October 1992 (age 34)
- Place of birth: Red Deer, Alberta, Canada
- Height: 1.80 m (5 ft 11 in)
- Position: Forward

Youth career
- Red Deer Renegades
- Goodyear
- 2009–2011: Ipswich Town
- 2012–2013: Sheffield Wednesday

Senior career*
Years	Team	Apps	(Gls)
2012–2016	Sheffield Wednesday	34	(6)
2013	→ Southend United (loan)	3	(0)
2013–2014	→ Plymouth Argyle (loan)	8	(3)
2015	→ Chesterfield (loan)	8	(3)
2015–2016	→ Portsmouth (loan)	13	(4)
2016–2019	Sheffield United	30	(4)
2018	→ Rotherham United (loan)	14	(2)
2018–2019	→ Bury (loan)	23	(5)
2019–2021	Walsall	64	(10)
2021–2022	Bradford City	19	(1)
2022–2023	Scunthorpe United	18	(8)
2023–2024	Doncaster Rovers	12	(1)
Total		246	(47)

International career
2008	Canada U17	1	(0)
2009	Northern Ireland U19	5	(0)
2010–2014	Northern Ireland U21	7	(0)
- * Club domestic league appearances and goals

Caolan Owen Lavery (born 22 October 1992) is a former professional footballer who last played as a forward for Doncaster Rovers.

He also previously played in the English Football League for Sheffield Wednesday, Sheffield United, Walsall, Bradford City and Scunthorpe United, as well as on loan at Southend United, Plymouth Argyle, Chesterfield, Portsmouth, Rotherham and Bury.

He has represented both Canada and Northern Ireland at youth international level and is one of only a small number of footballers to have played for both Sheffield clubs.

== Club career ==
=== Early career ===
Lavery started his youth career in Canada, playing for the Red Deer Renegades. He then played with Northern Irish youth side Goodyear while having trials at Tottenham Hotspur, Portsmouth and Charlton Athletic. A successful trial at Ipswich Town saw him spend two years at the club before rejecting the offer of a new deal in late 2011 and leaving the club after his academy scholarship expired. He went on to have trials at Sunderland and Leicester City in November. In December 2011 Lavery was reported to be in talks with League Two club Bradford City.

=== Sheffield Wednesday ===
==== 2012–13 season ====
Finally, in the summer of 2012, Lavery signed for Sheffield Wednesday to join their development squad. On 28 August 2012, Lavery was included in Sheffield Wednesday's first-team squad as an unused substitute for the League Cup tie against Premier League Fulham. A 1–0 win saw Sheffield Wednesday enter the third round of the competition, but Lavery failed to get on the pitch for that game, against Premier League outfit Southampton.

After continuing success in Sheffield Wednesday's development squad, Lavery was targeted by clubs for a possible loan deal and, on 25 January 2013, he signed for League Two side Southend United. He made his professional debut a week later on 2 February when Southend hosted Oxford United.

==== 2013–14 season ====
On 10 August 2013, Lavery was named on the bench for Wednesday for the home Football League Championship game against Burnley. This was the second game of the season and Wednesday's first home game. In the second half, with Wednesday trailing 2–1, Lavery made his debut for the club but was unable to help his side to salvage a point. In November 2013, he joined League Two club Plymouth Argyle on loan until the start of January 2014. Lavery made his debut against Dagenham & Redbridge the next day, and scored the first senior goal of his career during his first start against Bury on 21 December. Five days later, he opened a 3–2 win at former club Oxford with a goal in the first minute of the second half. The loan was then extended for a month after he scored his third goal in four starts on New Year's Day against Torquay United, but he was recalled less than a week later.

Upon his return to Sheffield Wednesday, Lavery was used as a second-half substitute against Leeds United on 11 January 2014. He scored two goals, his first professional goals for Sheffield Wednesday, in their 6–0 home victory against their Yorkshire rivals. He scored a further brace for the Owls in a 4–1 win over Birmingham City on 15 March 2014.

==== 2014–15 season ====
On 2 February 2015, Lavery was loaned to League One team Chesterfield until 7 March, replacing Cardiff City-bound Eoin Doyle. On 9 March, having scored three goals in seven games including a last-minute winner at Milton Keynes Dons, he extended his loan until the end of the season, but was recalled by Wednesday only six days later, due to an injury to Will Keane.

He scored his first Wednesday goal of the season on 21 March, as they came from behind to win 3–2 at South Yorkshire rivals Rotherham United. On 11 April he added a second, opening a 1–1 home draw against Charlton with a volley from Lewis Buxton's cross.

=== Sheffield United ===
On 30 August 2016, Lavery joined Sheffield United after turning down a new contract offer from city rivals Wednesday. His first goal for them was in a 4–0 home win against Swindon Town. On 29 January 2018, Lavery moved to South Yorkshire neighbours Rotherham United, on loan until the end of the 2017–18 season. He was transfer-listed by Sheffield United at the end of the 2017–18 season. Lavery joined Bury on a season-long loan on 31 August 2018. He scored his first goal for Bury in a 2-1 EFL Trophy loss against Rochdale on 4 September 2018.

He was released by Sheffield United at the end of the 2018–19 season.

=== Walsall ===
On 6 August 2019, Lavery signed an undisclosed-length contract with Walsall.

=== Bradford City ===
He signed for Bradford City on 2 August 2021. Lavery was released by the club after one season.

=== Scunthorpe United ===
On 22 September 2022, Lavery signed for National League club Scunthorpe United on a deal until January 2023. He made his debut for the club two days later, scoring his side's first goal to start a comeback as Scunthorpe came back from 2–0 down to defeat Dorking Wanderers 3–2. Lavery scored a hat-trick in Scunthorpe's 3–0 victory over Maidenhead United on 7 January 2023, but was reported likely to leave the club by 22 January due to its financial difficulties, something confirmed at the end of his contract.

=== Doncaster Rovers ===
On 24 January 2023, Lavery signed for League Two club Doncaster Rovers on an eighteen-month deal. On 15 May 2024, the club announced he would be released in the summer when his contract expired.

Lavery retired on 5 August 2024 because of injury.

== International career ==
Lavery is eligible to play for his country of birth Canada and, as both his parents were born there, either Northern Ireland or the Republic of Ireland. Before Lavery's move to England he played for Canada U-17 in warm-up games in preparation to qualifiers for the 2009 FIFA U-17 World Cup. However, after playing time in Northern Ireland for Goodyear and then his move to Ipswich Town, he switched to the Northern Ireland national side. He made his debut for Northern Ireland U-21 on 17 November 2010 in a 3–1 loss against Scotland. He has also made three appearances for the Northern Ireland U-19 team.

On 21 May 2015, Lavery was given his first call-up to the senior Northern Ireland team ahead of a friendly with Qatar and a UEFA Euro 2016 qualifying match against Romania. Manager Michael O'Neill had wanted him to feature the previous Summer in a tour of South America, but Lavery was unavailable as he was the best man in his brother's wedding.

== Career statistics ==
As of 25 March 2023

Appearances and goals by club, season and competition
Club	Season	League			FA Cup		League Cup		Other		Total	
Club	Season	Division	Apps	Goals	Apps	Goals	Apps	Goals	Apps	Goals	Apps	Goals
Sheffield Wednesday	2012–13	Championship	0	0	0	0	0	0	0	0	0	0
Sheffield Wednesday	2013–14	Championship	21	4	2	0	0	0	0	0	23	4
Sheffield Wednesday	2014–15	Championship	13	2	1	0	0	0	0	0	14	2
Sheffield Wednesday	2015–16	Championship	0	0	0	0	2	0	0	0	2	0
Sheffield Wednesday	Total		34	6	3	0	2	0	0	0	39	6
Southend United (loan)	2012–13	League Two	3	0	0	0	0	0	1 (Note: Appearance(s) in Football League Trophy)	0	4	0
Plymouth Argyle (loan)	2013–14	League Two	8	3	0	0	0	0	0	0	8	3
Chesterfield (loan)	2014–15	League One	8	3	0	0	0	0	0	0	8	3
Portsmouth (loan)	2015–16	League Two	13	4	0	0	0	0	0	0	13	4
Sheffield United	2016–17	League One	27	4	2	0	0	0	1	0	30	4
Sheffield United	2017–18	Championship	3	0	1	0	2	1	0	0	6	1
Sheffield United	2018–19	Championship	0	0	0	0	0	0	0	0	0	0
Sheffield United	Total		30	4	3	0	2	1	1	0	36	5
Rotherham United (loan)	2017–18	League One	14	2	0	0	0	0	1 (Note: Appearance(s) in EFL League One play-offs)	0	15	2
Bury (loan)	2018–19	League Two	23	5	1	0	0	0	5	1	29	6
Walsall	2019–20	League Two	27	4	3	2	1	2	3	2	34	10
Walsall	2020–21	League Two	37	6	1	1	1	0	3	0	42	7
Walsall	Total		64	10	4	3	2	2	6	2	76	17
Bradford City	2021–22	League Two	19	1	0	0	0	0	1	0	20	1
Scunthorpe United	2022–23	National League	18	8	1	0	—		1 (Note: Appearance in FA Trophy)	1	20	9
Doncaster Rovers	2022–23	League Two	12	1	0	0	0	0	0	0	12	1
Career total			246	47	12	3	6	3	16	4	280	57

== Honours ==
Sheffield United

- EFL League One: 2016–17

Rotherham United

- EFL League One play-offs: 2018

Bury

- EFL League Two runner-up: 2018–19
