= Callum Hart =

Welsh footballer

Personal information
- Date of birth: 21 December 1985 (age 40)
- Place of birth: Cardiff, Wales
- Position: Defender

Team information
- Current team: Salisbury (assistant manager)

Senior career*
Years	Team	Apps	(Gls)
2004–2005	Bristol City	0	(0)
2005–2007	AFC Bournemouth	45	(0)
2007–2009	Weymouth	9	(0)
2009	Farnborough	1	(0)
2009	Bath City	0	(0)
2009–2010	Weston-super-Mare	19	(0)
2010–2011	Bath City	3	(0)
2011–2014	Salisbury City	59	(0)
2014–2015	Sutton United	16	(0)
2015–2018	Salisbury	4	(0)
- * Club domestic league appearances and goals

Callum Hart (born 21 December 1985) is a Welsh former footballer who is assistant manager of Salisbury.

== Career ==
Born in Cardiff, Hart grew up in the Penylan area. He began his career at Bristol City as a youth team player, but after failing to impress enough to gain a professional contract, was released by the club in 2005. He spent the summer working as a labourer and wrote to numerous clubs in The Football League, eventually being offered a trial with AFC Bournemouth. After impressing during the pre-season friendlies, he was offered a short-term contract and found himself in the first-team soon after, making his debut in the first round of the Football League Cup during a 4–3 penalty shoot-out win over Torquay United on 24 August 2005, and then was rewarded with his first start against Chesterfield.

His fine displays were rewarded in February 2006 when he earned a call-up to the Wales under-21 side against Paraguay. Unfortunately, he was unable to play as the south coast club were once again hit with an injury crisis.

Hart was released by Bournemouth on 7 May 2007 and joined Weymouth on non-contract terms in November. He left Weymouth in February 2009. He left Weymouth in February 2009 to join Farnborough. He played just 37 minutes for Boro during a 1–0 win over Banbury United before deciding to seek a professional contract elsewhere.

Hart joined Bath City in October 2009 on non-contract terms. However, he soon left the club and instead signed for Conference South side Weston-super-Mare. He rejoined Bath City prior to the start of the 2010–11 season but then moved on to Salisbury City on 14 March 2011.

After being dogged by injury for the closing months of the season, Hart signed non-contract terms with Salisbury ahead of the 2011–12 season to prove his fitness to the club. After some outstanding performances, and being voted player of the month for August by the Whites fans, he was offered a one-year deal by the club. However, shortly after doing so, he suffered a serious knee injury, ruling him out for the rest of the season.

He returned the following season, and was once again invited to prove his fitness ahead of the season, and was signed on non-contract terms to start with, before being offered a full contract after a successful pre-season period. The 2012–13 season saw Hart feature regularly in the first team, and he started the majority of matches for Salisbury. He signed a new contract ahead of the 2013–14 season.
