= Jack Kiersey =

English footballer

Personal information
- Full name: Jack Alexander Kiersey
- Date of birth: 26 June 1998 (age 28)
- Place of birth: Manchester, England
- Position: Midfielder

Team information
- Current team: Walsall
- Number: 18

Youth career
- 2008–2019: Everton

Senior career*
Years	Team	Apps	(Gls)
2019–2020	Walsall	2	(0)
- * Club domestic league appearances and goals as of 11:56, 21 August 2019 (UTC)

Jack Alexander Kiersey (born 26 September 1998) is an English professional footballer who plays as a midfielder most recently for Walsall.

== Career ==
Born in Manchester, Kiersey signed for Everton at the age of 10, turning professional in May 2017. He signed for Walsall in July 2019. His contract with the club expired in January 2020, and he left the club, although he continued to train with them. In June 2020, Walsall manager Darrell Clarke said he would consider giving Kiersey another chance if he overcame injury problems.

He is eligible to represent both England and the Republic of Ireland at international level.
