= James Hardy (footballer) =

English footballer (born 1996)

Personal information
- Full name: James Paul Hardy
- Date of birth: 11 May 1996 (age 30)
- Place of birth: Stockport, England
- Position: Midfielder

Team information
- Current team: Ashton United

Youth career
- 2005–2011: Oldham Athletic
- 2012–2015: Manchester City

Senior career*
Years	Team	Apps	(Gls)
2015–2019	AFC Fylde	89	(16)
2019	→ FC Halifax Town (loan)	6	(0)
2019–2020	Walsall	11	(1)
2020–2021	AFC Telford United	17	(1)
2021	Altrincham	11	(1)
2021–2022	Chester	10	(2)
2022	→ Buxton (loan)	5	(0)
2022–2023	Buxton	6	(0)
2022–2023	→ Macclesfield (loan)	8	(1)
2023	Macclesfield	16	(1)
2023	→ Ashton United (loan)	5	(2)
2023–	Ashton United	4	(1)

International career
2016–2019	England C	5	(0)
- * Club domestic league appearances and goals as of 02:28, 23 December 2023 (UTC)

James Paul Hardy (born 11 May 1996) is an English professional footballer who plays as a midfielder for Ashton United.

== Club career ==
Born in Stockport, Hardy signed for Oldham Athletic as a nine-year-old and spent six years with the club before being released in 2011. Following his release, Hardy was offered a trial by boyhood club Manchester City and signed a contract with the club in May 2012.

Hardy joined AFC Fylde in October 2015 and quickly became one of the brightest prospects in non-league football. He scored eight goals to help Fylde to the National League North title in 2016–17 but faced injury problems throughout the 2017–18 and 2018–19 seasons, limiting his game time. A hernia injury ruled Hardy out for four months in the 2018–19 season. On his return he joined FC Halifax Town on loan for a month in February 2019. Hardy played six times for the Shaymen before returning to Fylde. In total Hardy made 91 league appearances for Fylde, scoring 16 goals.

Hardy signed for Walsall in June 2019 after his contract expired at Fylde. He scored a late equaliser on his professional debut in a 1–1 draw against Forest Green on 10 August 2019.

He was released by the club at the end of the 2019–20 season, and signed for AFC Telford United in August 2020. On 20 February 2021, Hardy left the club by mutual consent.

On 22 February 2021, Hardy signed for National League side Altrincham.

On 15 June 2021, Hardy joined Chester on a one-year deal.

On 18 March 2022, Hardy joined Northern Premier League Premier Division side Buxton on loan for the remainder of the 2021–22 season. On 19 June 2022, Hardy joined the club on a permanent basis following their promotion.

In October 2022, Hardy joined Northern Premier League Division One West club Macclesfield on an initial one-month loan deal. This was later extended until the 8 January, becoming permanent upon the end of this extension. During his time at the club he was a part of the squad that won the 2022–23 Division One West title. In September 2023, he joined Ashton United on an initial one-month loan deal. He returned to Ashton United on a permanent basis in November 2023.

== International career ==
Hardy made his England C debut in November 2016, providing the assists for both goals in a 2–1 win against Estonia U23s.

He was awarded FA England C Player of the Year at the National Game Awards in May 2019 and earned five caps in total before entering the professional game.
