= Elijah Adebayo =

English footballer (born 1998)

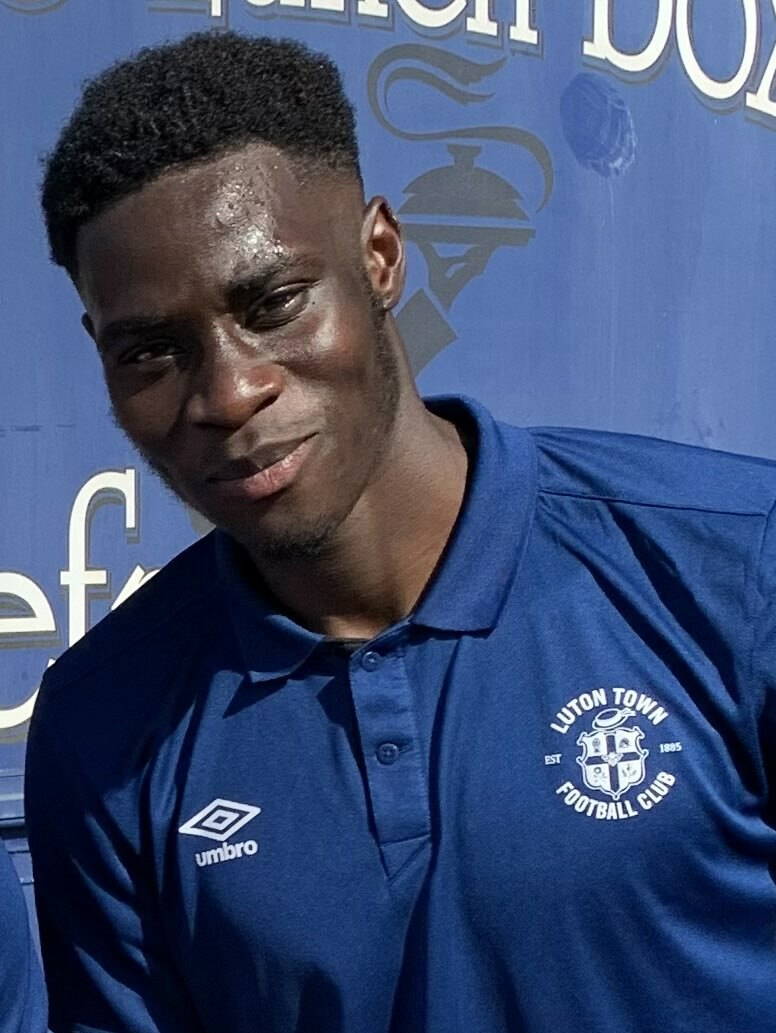
- Adebayo with Luton Town in 2021

Personal information
- Full name: Elijah Anuoluwapo Oluwaferanmi Oluwatomi Oluwalana Ayomikulehin Adebayo
- Date of birth: 7 January 1998 (age 28)
- Place of birth: Brent, England
- Height: 6 ft 4 in (1.93 m)
- Position: Forward

Team information
- Current team: Bristol City
- Number: 45

Youth career
- 2007–2016: Fulham

Senior career*
Years	Team	Apps	(Gls)
2016–2019	Fulham	0	(0)
2016	→ Slough Town (loan)	6	(1)
2017	→ Bognor Regis Town (loan)	6	(5)
2018	→ Cheltenham Town (loan)	7	(2)
2018–2019	→ Swindon Town (loan)	25	(5)
2019	→ Stevenage (loan)	2	(0)
2019–2021	Walsall	55	(18)
2021–2026	Luton Town	168	(43)
2026–	Bristol City	7	(0)
- * Club domestic league appearances and goals as of 13:26, 8 November 2026 (UTC)

Elijah Anuoluwapo Oluwaferanmi Oluwatomi Oluwalana Ayomikulehin Adebayo (born 7 January 1998) is an English professional footballer who plays as a forward for EFL Championship club Bristol City.

== Career ==
=== Fulham ===
==== Early career and non-league loans ====
Adebayo joined Fulham at under-nine level, and signed a scholarship in August 2014. He signed a one-year professional contract in July 2015.

He was sent on a one-month loan to Slough Town at the end of October 2016, and scored a hat-trick on his competitive debut in a 4–1 FA Trophy win over Bognor Regis Town on 29 October. In November, his loan was extended to January 2017. He returned to Fulham following six goals in 11 appearances for Slough.

Adebayo then moved on loan to Bognor Regis Town later that season, on 9 January 2017. He made his debut on 10 January in a 3–1 victory over Shoreham in a Sussex Senior Challenge Cup match. His league debut came on 14 January against Enfield Town; the match finished 1–1 with Adebayo scoring the equaliser. He scored a second-half hat-trick in a 5–0 win over Canvey Island on 21 January. He finished his loan with 5 goals in 7 appearances. Adebayo extended his contract with Fulham for another year in July 2017.

==== Cheltenham Town (loan) ====
After extending his Fulham contract by 18 months, Adebayo moved on loan to League Two side Cheltenham Town in January 2018. He made his debut on 13 January in a 2–0 defeat to Accrington Stanley. He scored on 20 January in a 3–2 defeat to Mansfield Town after coming on for injured Mohamed Eisa. Adebayo scored twice in 7 appearances before his loan ended.

==== Swindon Town (loan) ====
On 7 July 2018, Adebayo joined League Two side Swindon Town on a season-long loan. He started his debut on 4 August in a 3–2 win over Macclesfield Town. He scored his first goal in a 3–2 victory against Tranmere Rovers on 19 August. Adebayo had a promising start at Swindon, scoring 4 goals in his first 12 appearances; however this was followed by 1 goal in 14 games. Adebayo was subsequently recalled by Fulham in January 2019, with manager Richie Wellens stating, "I was disappointed that he turned up late several times and didn't perform to the level I expected."

==== Stevenage (loan) ====
On 31 January 2019 Adebayo moved on loan to Stevenage for the rest of the season. He faced a straight red card on his debut for elbowing an opposition player in a 2–0 defeat to Tranmere. Adebayo finished his loan with only 2 appearances for Stevenage.

He was released by Fulham at the end of the 2018–19 season.

=== Walsall ===
Following his release from Fulham, Adebayo signed for League Two club Walsall in June 2019. He made his debut on 3 August, starting in a 1–0 win over Northampton Town. He scored his first goal of the season on 28 September in a 3–2 win over Crawley Town. He finished his debut Walsall season with 8 goals in 37 appearances. The season was ended early because of the COVID-19 pandemic.

Adebayo extended his contract by one year in June 2020. He scored the winner in Walsall's first league match of the season, a 1–0 victory against Grimsby Town on 12 September. In January 2021, following rumours that Scottish side Heart of Midlothian had agreed terms with Adebayo, Walsall released a statement denying the claims.

=== Luton Town ===
On 1 February 2021, Adebayo signed for Championship side Luton Town for an undisclosed fee. He scored on his first start in a 1–1 draw against Millwall on 23 February 2021. In October 2022 he took time away due to off-field problems. He suffered racist abuse in October 2022, the third time in 12 months, and again in October 2023.

On 30 January 2024, Adebayo became the first Luton Town player to score a hat-trick in the Premier League in a 4–0 win over Brighton & Hove Albion.

After picking up an injury in February, Adebayo scored on his return to the team on 3 May 2024, at home to Everton.

Adebayo suffered an ACL injury in April 2025. In November 2025 he stated that he had restarted light training. He returned to the squad on 14 March 2026 as a substitute against Wycombe Wanderers, but suffered a hip injury shortly after. On 24 March 2026, he was ruled out for the rest of the 2025–26 season. He left the club at the end of the season.

=== Bristol City ===
He signed for Bristol City in August 2026.

== Personal life ==
Adebayo was born in England and is of Nigerian descent.

== Style of play ==
Primarily a forward, Adebayo has also played as a central defender.

== Career statistics ==
As of match played 7 November 2026

Appearances and goals by club, season and competition
Club	Season	League			FA Cup		EFL Cup		Other		Total	
Club	Season	Division	Apps	Goals	Apps	Goals	Apps	Goals	Apps	Goals	Apps	Goals
Fulham	2016–17	Championship	0	0	0	0	0	0	—		0	0
Fulham	2017–18	Championship	0	0	0	0	0	0	—		0	0
Fulham	2018–19	Premier League	0	0	0	0	0	0	—		0	0
Fulham	Total		0	0	0	0	0	0	0	0	0	0
Slough Town (loan)	2016–17	Southern League Premier Division	6	1	0	0	—		5 (Note: Four appearances and three goals in FA Trophy, one appearance and two goals in Berks & Bucks Senior Cup)	5	11	6
Bognor Regis Town (loan)	2016–17	Isthmian League Premier Division	6	5	—		—		—		6	5
Cheltenham Town (loan)	2017–18	League Two	7	2	0	0	0	0	0	0	7	2
Swindon Town (loan)	2018–19	League Two	25	5	2	0	1	0	2 (Note: Appearance(s) in EFL Trophy)	0	30	5
Stevenage (loan)	2018–19	League Two	2	0	0	0	0	0	0	0	2	0
Walsall	2019–20	League Two	30	8	2	0	1	0	4	0	37	8
Walsall	2020–21	League Two	25	10	1	0	1	0	1	0	28	10
Walsall	Total		55	18	3	0	2	0	5	0	65	18
Luton Town	2020–21	Championship	18	5	—		—		—		18	5
Luton Town	2021–22	Championship	40	16	1	1	0	0	1 (Note: Appearance(s) in Championship play-offs)	0	42	17
Luton Town	2022–23	Championship	42	7	4	2	0	0	3	1	49	10
Luton Town	2023–24	Premier League	27	10	3	0	2	0	—		32	10
Luton Town	2024–25	Championship	39	5	1	0	1	0	—		41	5
Luton Town	2025–26	League One	2	0	0	0	0	0	0	0	2	0
Luton Town	Total		168	43	9	3	3	0	4	1	184	47
Bristol City	2026–27	Championship	7	0	0	0	0	0	—		7	0
Career total			276	74	14	3	6	0	16	6	312	83

== Honours ==
Luton Town

- EFL Championship play-offs: 2023
