= Salisbury F.C. =

Association football club in England

Salisbury
- Full name: Salisbury Football Club
- Nickname: The Whites
- Founded: 2015; 11 years ago
- Ground: The Raymond McEnhill Stadium, Salisbury
- Capacity: 4,000 (500 seated)
- Chairman: Ali Alhamad
- Manager: Brian Dutton
- League: National League South
- 2025–26: National League South, 17th of 24
- Website: salisburyfc.co.uk
Home colours	Away colours

Salisbury Football Club is an English football club based in Salisbury, Wiltshire. Formed in 2015 after the liquidation of Salisbury City, the club currently plays in the National League South, the sixth tier of the English football league system, under the management of Brian Dutton.

== History ==
In June 2025, the club announced a change in ownership following new investment from Kuwaiti businessman Ali Alhamad.

== Ground ==
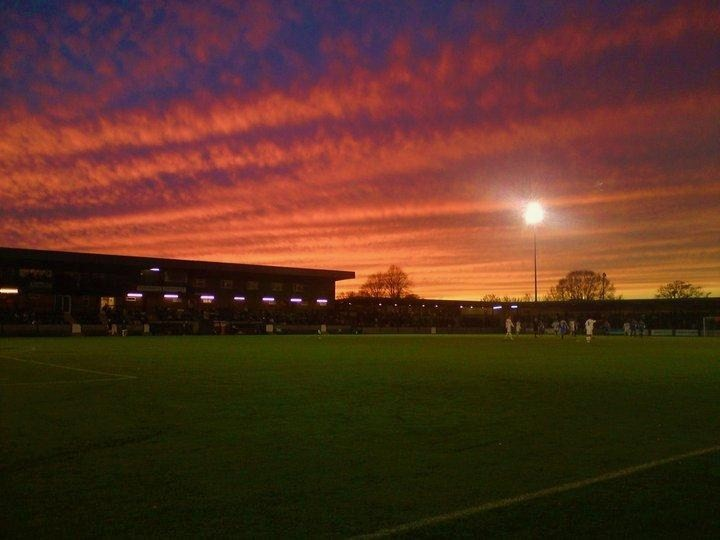
The Raymond McEnhill Stadium

The club play their home games at the Raymond McEnhill Stadium, often referred to as the "Ray Mac". The stadium's capacity officially stands at 4,000 (although it is technically able to hold 5,000), with covered accommodation for 2,247 fans.

== Players ==
As of 7 October 2026

Note: Flags indicate national team as defined under FIFA eligibility rules; some limited exceptions apply. Players may hold more than one non-FIFA nationality.

No.	Pos.	Nation	Player
1	GK	ENG	Will Henry
3	DF	ENG	Josh Sommerton (captain)
4	DF	ENG	Dan Ellison (on loan from Yeovil Town)
5	MF	ENG	Malachi Ogunleye
6	MF	ENG	Yacou Traore
7	MF	ITA	Mo Dabre
8	MF	ENG	Luke Russe
9	FW	ENG	Nathan Odokonyero
10	MF	ENG	Jordan Alonge
11	FW	ENG	Jeremy Sivi

No.	Pos.	Nation	Player
12	MF	ENG	Robbie Gallagher
13	GK	ENG	Zak Beard
14	MF	ENG	Josh Hedges
15	DF	ENG	Harry Thomas
16	MF	ENG	Caine Bradbury
20	MF	ENG	Rashawn Scott
24	DF	ENG	Dominic Revan
29	FW	GIB	Jaiden Bartolo
32	DF	ENG	Richard McIntyre
33	DF	ENG	Ollie Morgan

== Non-playing staff ==
- Manager: Brian Dutton
- Assistant Manager: Callum Hart
- Coach: Theo Lewis
- Strength and Conditioning Coach: Daniel Young
- Sports Physiotherapist: Harry Vickery
- Chairman: Ali Alhamad
- President: Ian Hammond
- Chief Operating Officer: Barak Almeshaan
- Football Development Officer: Matthew Hale
- Groundsman: Pete Robinson

== Managerial history ==
- 2015-2022 (England) Steve Claridge
- 2022- (England) Brian Dutton

== Honours ==
- Southern League Premier Division South
  - Play-Off Winners (1): 2023–24
- Southern League Division One West
  - Runners-up (1): 2017–18
- Wessex League Premier Division
  - Winners (1): 2015–16
- Wiltshire County Cup
  - Runners-up (2): 2018–19, 2024–2025
- Salisbury Hospital Cup
  - Winners (1): 2016–17
