= 2018–19 Morecambe F.C. season =

Morecambe F.C.
2018–19 season
- Chairmen: Peter McGuigan (up to 30 October 2018); Graham Howse & Rod Taylor (co-chairmen from 10 November 2018)
- Manager: Jim Bentley
- Stadium: Globe Arena
- League Two: 18th
- FA Cup: First round
- EFL Cup: First round
- EFL Trophy: Group Stage (4th)
- Top goalscorer: Aaron Collins (8)
- Highest home attendance: 3,749 v Carlisle United; 1 January 2019
- Lowest home attendance: 512 v Stoke City U23; 9 October 2018
- Average home league attendance: 2,033
- Biggest win: Morecambe 4–0 Cheltenham Town; 22 April 2019
- Biggest defeat: Crewe Alexandra 6–0 Morecambe; 4 August 2018
| Home colours | Away colours |
- All statistics correct as of match played 4 May 2019.

The 2018–19 season was Morecambe's 12th consecutive season in League Two, the fourth tier of English football. They finished 18th in League Two, and also competed in the FA Cup, EFL Cup and EFL Trophy. They were eliminated in the first round of the FA Cup and the EFL Cup, and in the Group stage of the EFL Trophy.

The season page covers the period between 1 July 2018 and 30 June 2019.

== Competitions ==
=== Pre-season friendlies ===
Morecambe revealed pre-season friendlies against Bamber Bridge, Alfreton Town, Chorley, Chester and Fleetwood Town.

| 10 July 2018 Friendly | Bamber Bridge | 1–2 | Morecambe | Bamber Bridge |
| 15:00 BST | Linney 49' (pen.) | Report | Ellison 10'; Campbell 46' | Stadium: Sir Tom Finney Stadium |

| 13 July 2018 Friendly | Alfreton Town | 2–3 | Morecambe | Alfreton |
| 19:45 BST | Shiels 32'; Denton 39' | Report | Campbell 21', 55'; Mendes Gomes 88' | Stadium: Impact Arnea |

| 17 July 2018 Friendly | Bolton Wanderers | 0–0 | Morecambe | Lostock |
| 13:30 BST | | Report | | Stadium: Eddie Davies Academy; Attendance: 0 |

| 21 July 2018 Friendly | Chorley | 0–5 | Morecambe | Chorley |
| 14:00 BST | | | | Stadium: Chorley Group Victory Park Stadium |

| 24 July 2018 Friendly | Chester | 2–2 | Morecambe | Chester |
| 19:45 BST | Howson 25'; Roberts 87' (pen.) | Report | Fleming 24'; Oswell 82' (pen.) | Stadium: Deva Stadium |

| 28 July 2018 Friendly | Morecambe | 1–3 | Fleetwood Town | Morecambe |
| 15:00 BST | Fleming 53' | Report | McAleny 22'; Burns 42'; Grant 66' | Stadium: Globe Arena |

=== League Two ===
==== League table ====
| Pos | Team | Pld | W | D | L | GF | GA | GD | Pts |
|---|---|---|---|---|---|---|---|---|---|
| 16 | Cheltenham Town | 46 | 15 | 12 | 19 | 57 | 68 | −11 | 57 |
| 17 | Grimsby Town | 46 | 16 | 8 | 22 | 45 | 56 | −11 | 56 |
| 18 | Morecambe | 46 | 14 | 12 | 20 | 54 | 70 | −16 | 54 |
| 19 | Crawley Town | 46 | 15 | 8 | 23 | 51 | 68 | −17 | 53 |
| 20 | Port Vale | 46 | 12 | 13 | 21 | 39 | 55 | −16 | 49 |

Source: EFL Official Website
Rules for classification: 1) Points; 2) Goal difference; 3) Number of goals scored; 4) Head-to-head results

==== Results summary ====
| Overall | | | | | | | | Home | | | | | | Away | | | | | |
| Pld | W | D | L | GF | GA | GD | Pts | W | D | L | GF | GA | GD | W | D | L | GF | GA | GD |
|---|---|---|---|---|---|---|---|---|---|---|---|---|---|---|---|---|---|---|---|
| 46 | 14 | 12 | 20 | 54 | 70 | −16 | 54 | 8 | 5 | 10 | 33 | 31 | +2 | 6 | 7 | 10 | 21 | 39 | −18 |

Last updated: 4 May 2019.
Source: BBC

==== Results by matchday ====
| Matchday | 1 | 2 | 3 | 4 | 5 | 6 | 7 | 8 | 9 | 10 | 11 | 12 | 13 | 14 | 15 | 16 | 17 | 18 | 19 | 20 | 21 | 22 | 23 | 24 | 25 | 26 | 27 | 28 | 29 | 30 | 31 | 32 | 33 | 34 | 35 | 36 | 37 | 38 | 39 | 40 | 41 | 42 | 43 | 44 | 45 | 46 |
|---|---|---|---|---|---|---|---|---|---|---|---|---|---|---|---|---|---|---|---|---|---|---|---|---|---|---|---|---|---|---|---|---|---|---|---|---|---|---|---|---|---|---|---|---|---|---|
| Ground | A | H | A | H | H | A | H | A | H | A | A | H | A | H | H | A | H | A | H | A | H | A | H | A | A | H | H | A | H | A | H | A | A | H | A | H | H | A | A | H | A | H | A | H | A | H |
| Result | L | L | L | W | L | L | L | L | W | W | D | L | W | L | L | D | W | W | D | L | D | L | W | L | D | L | D | D | L | D | L | W | W | L | L | W | W | D | L | W | D | D | L | W | W | D |
| Position | 24 | 24 | 24 | 20 | 22 | 22 | 22 | 22 | 21 | 17 | 18 | 20 | 17 | 18 | 20 | 21 | 20 | 19 | 19 | 20 | 19 | 20 | 19 | 20 | 20 | 20 | 20 | 21 | 22 | 22 | 22 | 21 | 20 | 20 | 21 | 20 | 19 | 19 | 19 | 18 | 19 | 19 | 20 | 18 | 18 | 18 |

Updated to match(es) played on 4 May 2019. Source: Statto.com
A = Away; H = Home; W = Win; D = Draw; L = Loss

==== Matches ====
On 21 June 2018, the League Two fixtures for the forthcoming season were announced.

| 4 August 2018 1 | Crewe Alexandra | 6–0 | Morecambe | Crewe |
| 15:00 BST | Kirk 6'; Nicholls 10', 63' (yellow card) 50'; Jones 72', 90+1'; Porter 87' | Report | Fleming (yellow card) 56'; Wildig (yellow card) 65' | Stadium: Gresty Road; Attendance: 3,559; Referee: Alan Young |

| 11 August 2018 2 | Morecambe | 0–2 | Exeter City | Morecambe |
| 15:00 BST | | Report | Sweeney 43' (pen.); Stockley 66' | Stadium: Globe Arena; Attendance: 1,654; Referee: Thomas Bramall |

| 18 August 2018 3 | Stevenage | 1–0 | Morecambe | Stevenage |
| 15:00 BST | Timlin 45'; Wildin (yellow card) 88' | Report | Yarney (yellow card) 45+4'; Fleming (yellow card) 71' | Stadium: Lamex Stadium; Attendance: 2,030; Referee: Matt Donohue |

| 21 August 2018 4 | Morecambe | 1–0 | Northampton Town | Morecambe |
| 19:45 BST | Mandeville (yellow card) 10'; Old (yellow card) 44'; Leitch-Smith 45+2'; Yarney (yellow card) 55'; Kenyon (yellow card) 78'; Roche (red card) 86' | Report | Bowditch (yellow card) 55'; Barnett (yellow card) 56' | Stadium: Globe Arena; Attendance: 1,594; Referee: Mark Heywood |

| 25 August 2018 5 | Morecambe | 0–2 | Oldham Athletic | Morecambe |
| 15:00 BST | | Report | Gardner (yellow card) 16'; O'Grady 27'; Nepomuceno 29'; Iversen (yellow card) 68'; Clarke (yellow card) 70'; Missilou (yellow card) 71' | Stadium: Globe Arena; Attendance: 3,050; Referee: Martin Coy |

| 1 September 2018 6 | Bury | 3–2 | Morecambe | Bury |
| 15:00 BST | Thompson 29'; Telford 44', 86' | Report | Oates 38'; Mandeville 90+2'; Wildig (yellow card) 90+6' | Stadium: Gigg Lane; Attendance: 3,242; Referee: Ben Toner |

| 8 September 2018 7 | Morecambe | 0–1 | Swindon Town | Morecambe |
| 15:00 BST | Old (yellow card) 78' | Report | Adebayo 26'; Knoyle (red card) 35'; McCourt (yellow card) 78' | Stadium: Globe Arena; Attendance: 1,559; Referee: Paul Marsden |

| 15 September 2018 8 | Crawley Town | 2–0 | Morecambe | Crawley |
| 15:00 BST | Bulman (yellow card) 28'; Connolly (yellow card) 35'; Nathaniel-George 52'; Camará 55' (yellow card) 88' | Report | Yarney (yellow card) 23'; Piggott (yellow card) 50'; Cranston (yellow card) 79' | Stadium: Broadfield Stadium; Attendance: 1,895; Referee: Alan Young |

| 22 September 2018 9 | Morecambe | 2–1 | Macclesfield Town | Morecambe |
| 15:00 BST | Lavelle (yellow card) 23'; Leitch-Smith 61'; Fleming 77' | Report | Rose (red card) 38'; Whitaker 72' | Stadium: Globe Arena; Attendance: 1,622; Referee: Geoff Eltringham |

| 29 September 2018 10 | Grimsby Town | 1–2 | Morecambe | Cleethorpes |
| 15:00 BST | Embleton 9'; Collins (yellow card) 14'; Cook (yellow card) 51' | Report | Oates 61'; Mandeville 65' | Stadium: Blundell Park; Attendance: 3,972; Referee: Chris Sarginson |

| 2 October 2018 11 | Cheltenham Town | 2–2 | Morecambe | Cheltenham |
| 19:45 BST | Varney 44', 90+4' | Report | Cranston 32'; Oates 54' | Stadium: Jonny-Rocks Stadium; Attendance: 2,095; Referee: Neil Hair |

| 6 October 2018 12 | Morecambe | 3–4 | Tranmere Rovers | Morecambe |
| 15:00 BST | Oates 13' (yellow card) 23'; Oliver 73'; Leitch-Smith 80' | Report | Banks 28'; Gilmour 41', 89'; Smith 54'; Jennings (yellow card) 72'; Buxton (yellow card) 80'; McCullough (yellow card) 90+5' | Stadium: Globe Arena; Attendance: 2,793; Referee: Trevor Kettle |

| 13 October 2018 13 | Carlisle United | 0–2 | Morecambe | Carlisle |
| 15:00 BST | | Report | Leitch-Smith 14'; Oliver 26' | Stadium: Brunton Park; Attendance: 4,569; Referee: Seb Stockbridge |

| 20 October 2018 14 | Morecambe | 0–1 | Colchester United | Morecambe |
| 15:00 BST | Cranston (yellow card) 52'; Ellison (yellow card) 86' | Report | Senior 45'; Pell (yellow card) 61'; Dickenson (yellow card) 81' | Stadium: Globe Arena; Attendance: 1,839; Referee: Andy Haines |

| 23 October 2018 15 | Morecambe | 0–1 | Mansfield Town | Morecambe |
| 19:45 BST | Ellison (yellow card) 21'; Oliver (yellow card) 56'; Conlan (yellow card) 72' | Report | Bishop 36'; Khan (yellow card) 72'; Pearce (yellow card) 72'; Preston (yellow card) 82' | Stadium: Globe Arena; Attendance: 1,355; Referee: Robert Lewis |

| 27 October 2018 16 | Newport County | 1–1 | Morecambe | Newport |
| 15:00 BST | Amond 1'; O'Brien (yellow card) 8'; Matt (yellow card) 59' | Report | Ellison 77' (yellow card) 86' | Stadium: Rodney Parade; Attendance: 3,206; Referee: Ollie Yates |

| 3 November 2018 17 | Morecambe | 2–1 | Yeovil Town | Morecambe |
| 15:00 GMT | Leitch-Smith 23'; Oates 48'; Lavelle (yellow card) 58'; Cranston (yellow card) 90' | Report | Olomola (yellow card) 10' (goal) 68'; James (yellow card) 16'; Zoko (yellow card) 78' | Stadium: Globe Arena; Attendance: 1,406; Referee: Peter Wright |

| 17 November 2018 18 | Forest Green Rovers | 0–1 | Morecambe | Nailsworth |
| 15:00 GMT | Archibald (yellow card) 45'; Digby (yellow card) 90+2' | Report | Wildig 86'; Leitch-Smith (yellow card) 90+2' | Stadium: The New Lawn; Attendance: 3,085; Referee: Ben Toner |

| 24 November 2018 19 | Morecambe | 1–1 | Notts County | Morecambe |
| 15:00 GMT | Ellison 88' | Report | Dennis 52'; Husin (yellow card) 71' | Stadium: Globe Arena; Attendance: 1,658; Referee: Dean Whitestone |

| 27 November 2018 20 | Milton Keynes Dons | 2–0 | Morecambe | Denbigh |
| 19:45 GMT | Gilbey 58', 84' | Report | Oswell (yellow card) 59' | Stadium: Stadium MK; Attendance: 5,726; Referee: John Busby |

| 8 December 2018 21 | Morecambe | 2–2 | Port Vale | Morecambe |
| 15:00 GMT | Leitch-Smith 27'; Oswell 40'; Ellison (yellow card) 83'; Mandeville (yellow card) 90+3' | Report | Montaño (yellow card) 49'; Kay 83'; Rawlinson (yellow card) 85'; Pope 87' | Stadium: Globe Arena; Attendance: 1,769; Referee: Andy Haines |

| 15 December 2018 22 | Lincoln City | 3–1 | Morecambe | Lincoln |
| 15:00 GMT | Anderson 7'; Akinde 33' (pen.); Shackell 37'; O'Connor (yellow card) 55' | Report | Conlan (yellow card) 61'; Ellison 80'; Lavelle (yellow card) 87' | Stadium: Sincil Bank; Attendance: 7,975; Referee: Seb Stockbridge |

| 22 December 2018 23 | Morecambe | 3–0 | Cambridge United | Morecambe |
| 15:00 GMT | Yarney (yellow card) 37'; Oliver 66'; Cranston (yellow card) 74'; Tutte 87' (yellow card) 87'; Ellison 90+1' | Report | Darling (yellow card) 33' | Stadium: Globe Arena; Attendance: 1,439; Referee: Eddie Ilderton |

| 26 December 2018 24 | Tranmere Rovers | 3–1 | Morecambe | Birkenhead |
| 15:00 GMT | Stockton 3' (yellow card) 37'; Norwood 29'; Harris 45'; Ellis (yellow card) 86' | Report | Wildig (yellow card) 57'; Mills (yellow card) 65'; Cranston 66' | Stadium: Prenton Park; Attendance: 7,483; Referee: Scott Oldham |

| 29 December 2018 25 | Colchester United | 0–0 | Morecambe | Colchester |
| 15:00 GMT | | Report | Mendes Gomes (yellow card) 63' | Stadium: Colchester Community Stadium; Attendance: 3,653; Referee: John Busby |

| 1 January 2019 26 | Morecambe | 0–2 | Carlisle United | Morecambe |
| 15:00 GMT | Oliver (yellow card) 89'; Cranston (yellow card) 89' | Report | Devitt 15'; Etuhu (yellow card) 40'; Sowerby 76'; Gerrard (yellow card) 89' | Stadium: Globe Arena; Attendance: 3,749; Referee: Ben Toner |

| 5 January 2019 27 | Morecambe | 2–2 | Crewe Alexandra | Morecambe |
| 15:00 GMT | Oates (yellow card) 55'; Tutte 63'; Mandeville (yellow card) 75'; Ellison 84'; Cranston (yellow card) 90+2' | Report | Jones 27'; Porter 90+4' (pen.) | Stadium: Globe Arena; Attendance: 1,662; Referee: Carl Boyeson |

| 12 January 2019 28 | Exeter City | 0–0 | Morecambe | Exeter |
| 15:00 GMT | Moxey (yellow card) 53'; Law (yellow card) 68' | Report | Ellison (yellow card) 90+2' | Stadium: St James Park; Attendance: 4,113; Referee: Brett Huxtable |

| 19 January 2019 29 | Morecambe | 1–2 | Stevenage | Morecambe |
| 15:00 GMT | Ellison 70' | Report | Kennedy 25' (pen.); Timlin (yellow card) 64'; Wilkinson 90+4' | Stadium: Globe Arena; Attendance: 1,422; Referee: Graham Salisbury |

| 26 January 2019 30 | Northampton Town | 1–1 | Morecambe | Northampton |
| 14:00 GMT | Pierre (yellow card) 15'; Elšnik 22' | Report | Lavelle (yellow card) 36'; Bennett 52' | Stadium: Sixfields Stadium; Attendance: 4,512; Referee: Lee Collins |

| 2 February 2019 P | Oldham Athletic | P–P | Morecambe | Oldham |
| 15:00 GMT | | Report | | Stadium: Boundary Park |
Note: Fixture postponed due to pitch unplayable.

| 9 February 2019 31 | Morecambe | 2–3 | Bury | Morecambe |
| 15:00 GMT | Mills (yellow card) 58'; Bennett 65' (yellow card) 89'; Old 69' | Report | Mayor 17'; O'Shea 45+4', 59' (yellow card) 60' | Stadium: Globe Arena; Attendance: 2,665; Referee: Anthony Backhouse |

| 16 February 2019 32 | Port Vale | 0–1 | Morecambe | Burslem |
| 15:00 GMT | Pope (penalty missed) 20'; Kay (yellow card) 68'; Hannant (yellow card) 72' | Report | Kenyon (yellow card) 31'; Mendes Gomes (yellow card) 63'; Cranston (yellow card) 72'; Collins 75' | Stadium: Vale Park; Attendance: 4,147; Referee: John Busby |

| 19 February 2019 33 | Oldham Athletic | 1–2 | Morecambe | Oldham |
| 19:45 GMT | Clarke (yellow card) 68'; Baxter 76' | Report | Cranston 4' (yellow card) 74'; Collins 90' (yellow card) 90+1' | Stadium: Boundary Park; Attendance: 4,218; Referee: Andy Haines |

| 23 February 2019 34 | Morecambe | 0–2 | Lincoln City | Morecambe |
| 15:00 GMT | Conlan (yellow card) 67' | Report | Andrade 10', 57'; Bostwick (yellow card) 77' | Stadium: Globe Arena; Attendance: 2,352; Referee: Martin Coy |

| 2 March 2019 35 | Yeovil Town | 3–2 | Morecambe | Yeovil |
| 15:00 GMT | Santos (yellow card) 42'; Abrahams 58', 62'; Seager 87'; Zoko (yellow card) 90+2' | Report | Bennett 22'; Kenyon (yellow card) 47'; Sutton (yellow card) 57'; Old 83'; Halstead (yellow card) 89'; Cranston (yellow card) 90+1'; Ellison (yellow card) 90+2' | Stadium: Huish Park; Attendance: 2,521; Referee: Antony Coggins |

| 9 March 2019 36 | Morecambe | 3–0 | Forest Green Rovers | Morecambe |
| 15:00 GMT | Oates 6'; Collins 35'; Kenyon 71' | Report | | Stadium: Globe Arena; Attendance: 1,528; Referee: Carl Boyeson |

| 12 March 2019 37 | Morecambe | 4–2 | Milton Keynes Dons | Morecambe |
| 19:45 GMT | Bennett 21', 57'; Cissé 41' (o.g.); Collins 86' | Report | Hesketh (yellow card) 40'; Cissé (yellow card) 45'; Agard 70', 76'; Aneke (yellow card) 90+1' | Stadium: Globe Arena; Attendance: 1,460; Referee: Ross Joyce |

| 16 March 2019 38 | Notts County | 0–0 | Morecambe | Nottingham |
| 15:00 GMT | Rose (yellow card) 50'; Doyle (yellow card) 90+5' | Report | Bennett (yellow card) 14'; Mingoia (yellow card) 33'; Cranston (yellow card) 67'; Fleming (yellow card) 86'; Halstead (yellow card) 90+5' | Stadium: Meadow Lane; Attendance: 5,813; Referee: Kevin Johnson |

| 23 March 2019 39 | Swindon Town | 4–0 | Morecambe | Swindon |
| 15:00 GMT | Robinson 10'; Woolery 42'; Conroy 66'; Bennett (yellow card) 80' (goal) 81' | Report | Kenyon (yellow card) 36' | Stadium: County Ground; Attendance: 5,707; Referee: Nick Kinseley |

| 30 March 2019 40 | Morecambe | 1–0 | Crawley Town | Morecambe |
| 15:00 GMT | Mandeville 82' | Report | McNerney (yellow card) 66' | Stadium: Globe Arena; Attendance: 2,445; Referee: Eddie Ilderton |

| 6 April 2019 41 | Macclesfield Town | 1–1 | Morecambe | Macclesfield |
| 15:00 BST | Durrell 33' | Report | Mills 26' | Stadium: Moss Rose; Attendance: 2,072; Referee: Lee Probert |

| 13 April 2019 42 | Morecambe | 1–1 | Grimsby Town | Morecambe |
| 15:00 BST | Collins 80' (pen.) | Report | Vernam 88' | Stadium: Globe Arena; Attendance: 1,897; Referee: Scott Oldham |

| 19 April 2019 43 | Mansfield Town | 4–0 | Morecambe | Mansfield |
| 15:00 BST | Mellis 30'; Pearce (yellow card) 45' (goal) 70'; Sweeney (yellow card) 54'; Hamilton 73'; Benning 85' | Report | Fleming (yellow card) 28'; Kenyon (yellow card) 36'; Mills (yellow card) 50' | Stadium: Field Mill; Attendance: 5,177; Referee: Trevor Kettle |

| 22 April 2019 44 | Morecambe | 4–0 | Cheltenham Town | Morecambe |
| 15:00 BST | Oliver 49'; Ellison 53'; Lavelle 81'; Collins 85' | Report | Thomas (yellow card) 75'; Bingham (yellow card) 80' | Stadium: Globe Arena; Attendance: 3,066; Referee: Jarred Gillett |

| 27 April 2019 45 | Cambridge United | 1–2 | Morecambe | Cambridge |
| 15:00 BST | Deegan (yellow card) 85'; Knowles 90+2' | Report | Collins 9'; Lavelle (yellow card) 33'; Cranston (yellow card) 83' (goal) 87' | Stadium: Abbey Stadium; Attendance: 4,083; Referee: Nick Kinseley |

| 4 May 2019 46 | Morecambe | 1–1 | Newport County | Morecambe |
| 15:00 BST | Collins 20'; Oliver (yellow card) 42'; Fleming (yellow card) 63'; Lavelle (yellow card) 90' | Report | O'Brien (yellow card) 55'; Matt 87' | Stadium: Globe Arena; Attendance: 2,776; Referee: Neil Hair |

=== FA Cup ===
The first round draw was made live on BBC by Dennis Wise and Dion Dublin on 22 October.

| 10 November 2018 First round | Morecambe | 0–0 | FC Halifax Town | Morecambe |
| 15:00 GMT | | Report | Skarz (yellow card) 25'; Odelusi (yellow card) 56'; Maher (yellow card) 73' | Stadium: Globe Arena; Attendance: 1,736; Referee: Darren Drysdale |

| 20 November 2018 First round replay | FC Halifax Town | 1–0 | Morecambe | Halifax |
| 19:45 GMT | King 12'; Clarke (yellow card) 19'; Kosylo (yellow card) 69' | Report | Cranston (yellow card) 54'; Leitch-Smith (yellow card) 64' | Stadium: The Shay; Attendance: 1,218; Referee: Martin Coy |

=== EFL Cup ===
On 15 June 2018, the draw for the first round was made in Vietnam.

| 14 August 2018 First round | Preston North End | 3–1 | Morecambe | Preston |
| 19:45 BST | Barker 14'; Moult 33'; Fisher (yellow card) 45+1'; Burke 58' | Report | Mandeville 45+2' | Stadium: Deepdale; Attendance: 6,077; Referee: Tom Nield |

=== EFL Trophy ===
On 13 July 2018, the initial group stage draw bar the U21 invited clubs was announced.

| Pos | Lge | Team | Pld | W | PW | PL | L | GF | GA | GD | Pts | Qualification |
|---|---|---|---|---|---|---|---|---|---|---|---|---|
| 1 | L1 | Sunderland | 3 | 2 | 1 | 0 | 0 | 4 | 1 | +3 | 8 | Round 2 |
| 2 | ACA | Stoke City U21 | 3 | 1 | 1 | 1 | 0 | 3 | 2 | +1 | 6 | Round 2 |
| 3 | L2 | Carlisle United | 3 | 1 | 0 | 1 | 1 | 5 | 6 | −1 | 4 | |
| 4 | L2 | Morecambe | 3 | 0 | 0 | 0 | 3 | 3 | 6 | −3 | 0 | |

Source: EFL.com

| 4 September 2018 Group Stage | Carlisle United | 3–2 | Morecambe | Carlisle |
| 19:45 BST | Glendon 13'; Gillesphey 38'; Yates 76' | Report | Oliver 6'; Piggott 24'; Jagne (yellow card) 33' | Stadium: Brunton Park; Attendance: 1,213; Referee: Andy Haines |

| 9 October 2018 Group Stage | Morecambe | 1–2 | Stoke City U23 | Morecambe |
| 19:45 BST | Oswell 26'; Conlan (yellow card) 59' | Report | Shenton 9'; Campbell 57'; Tymon (yellow card) 65'; Pemberton (yellow card) 90+1' | Stadium: Globe Arena; Attendance: 512; Referee: Anthony Backhouse |

| 13 November 2018 Group Stage | Morecambe | 0–1 | Sunderland | Morecambe |
| 19:45 GMT | Kenyon (yellow card) 35'; Cuvelier (yellow card) 45+2'; Thompson (yellow card) 54' | Report | Maja 90+1' | Stadium: Globe Arena; Attendance: 2,377; Referee: Paul Marsden |

== Transfers ==
=== Transfers in ===
| Date from | Position | Nationality | Name | From | Fee | Ref. |
|---|---|---|---|---|---|---|
| 1 July 2018 | CM | ENG | Lamin Jagne | Free agent | —N/a | |
| 1 July 2018 | CF | ESP | Carlos Mendes Gomes | West Didsbury & Chorlton | Free transfer | |
| 1 July 2018 | RB | ENG | Zak Mills | Grimsby Town | Free transfer | |
| 1 July 2018 | LW | ENG | Rhys Oates | Hartlepool United | Free transfer | |
| 1 July 2018 | CF | ENG | Jason Oswell | Stockport County | Undisclosed | |
| 1 July 2018 | RB | ENG | James Sinclair | (Sweden) GAIS | Free transfer | |
| 1 July 2018 | CM | ENG | Andrew Tutte | Bury | Free transfer | |
| 3 July 2018 | LB | WAL | Jordan Cranston | Cheltenham Town | Free transfer | |
| 9 July 2018 | GK | ENG | Mark Halstead | Southport | Free transfer | |
| 23 July 2018 | GK | POL | Dawid Szczepaniak | (Wales) Airbus UK Broughton | Free transfer | |
| 8 August 2018 | CF | ENG | A-Jay Leitch-Smith | Shrewsbury Town | Free transfer | |
| 26 October 2018 | CM | BEL | Florent Cuvelier | Walsall | Free transfer | |
| 9 January 2019 | CB | ENG | Ritchie Sutton | Tranmere Rovers | Free transfer | |
| 9 February 2019 | RW | WAL | Aaron Collins | Wolverhampton Wanderers | Free transfer | |

=== Transfers out ===
| Date from | Position | Nationality | Name | To | Fee | Ref. |
|---|---|---|---|---|---|---|
| 1 July 2018 | LB | ENG | Patrick Brough | (Scotland) Falkirk | Released | |
| 1 July 2018 | CF | WAL | Reece Deakin | Free agent | Released | |
| 1 July 2018 | CF | ENG | Luke Jordan | Chester | Released | |
| 1 July 2018 | RB | ENG | Aaron McGowan | (Scotland) Hamilton Academical | Free transfer | |
| 1 July 2018 | CF | NIR | Adam McGurk | Nuneaton Town | Released | |
| 1 July 2018 | GK | AUS | Danijel Nizic | (Australia) Western Sydney Wanderers | Mutual consent | |
| 1 July 2018 | DM | ENG | Michael Rose | Macclesfield Town | Released | |
| 1 July 2018 | CF | ENG | Rhys Turner | Barrow | Released | |
| 1 July 2018 | CB | ENG | Dean Winnard | Southport | Released | |
| 1 July 2018 | LM | ENG | Steven Yawson | Free agent | Released | |
| 4 July 2018 | LB | ENG | Leif Davis | Leeds United | Undisclosed | |
| 2 January 2019 | RW | ENG | Garry Thompson | Workington | Released | |
| 5 January 2019 | CF | ENG | Jason Oswell | (Wales) Wrexham | Undisclosed | |

=== Loans in ===
| Start date | Position | Nationality | Name | From | End date | Ref. |
|---|---|---|---|---|---|---|
| 12 July 2018 | CF | ENG | Liam Mandeville | Doncaster Rovers | 31 May 2019 | |
| 10 August 2018 | CB | ENG | Josef Yarney | Newcastle United | 10 January 2019 | |
| 31 August 2018 | CF | ENG | Joe Piggott | Wigan Athletic | 1 January 2019 | |
| 4 January 2019 | CB | SCO | Paul McKay | (Wales) Cardiff City | 31 May 2019 | |
| 17 January 2019 | CF | ENG | Richie Bennett | Morecambe | 31 May 2019 | |
| 31 January 2019 | CF | ENG | Sam Dalby | Leeds United | 31 May 2019 | |
| 31 January 2019 | RM | ENG | Piero Mingoia | Accrington Stanley | 31 May 2019 | |

=== Loans out ===
| Start date | Position | Nationality | Name | To | End date | Ref. |
|---|---|---|---|---|---|---|
| 20 July 2018 | RW | PHI | Gilmàr | (Philippines) Global Cebu | 31 December 2018 | |
| 3 August 2018 | SS | ENG | Adam Campbell | Carlisle United | 1 January 2019 | |
| 17 August 2018 | DM | ENG | Tyler Brownsword | Skelmersdale United | September 2018 | |
| 17 August 2018 | CF | ENG | Kyle Hawley | Skelmersdale United | September 2018 | |
