= 2004–05 Yeovil Town F.C. season =

Yeovil Town
2004–05 season
- Chairman: John Fry
- Manager: Gary Johnson
- Stadium: Huish Park
- League Two: 1st (promoted)
- FA Cup: Fourth round
- League Cup: Second round
- FL Trophy: First round
- Top goalscorer: League: Phil Jevons (27); All: Phil Jevons (29)
- Highest home attendance: 9,153 (12 February vs. Bristol Rovers, League Two)
- Lowest home attendance: 4,639 (7 December vs. Kidderminster Harriers, League Two)
- Average home league attendance: 6,320
Home colours	Away colours

The 2004–05 season was Yeovil Town Football Club's second season in the Football League. It was also the season in which they gained promotion to the third tier of English football for the first time in their history.

== Season summary ==
The 2004–05 season was the club's second season in the Football League and manager Gary Johnson's fourth season in charge. Although they lost their first game of the season away to Bury, they started the season fairly well and were top of League Two with 10 games played. Despite going the next 5 league games without a win, a run of 10 league wins out of a possible 11 left them top of the table and 8 points clear of 4th placed Southend United. Yeovil also had some success in the FA Cup, setting up a 4th round tie away to Charlton Athletic, after defeating Darlington, Histon and Rotherham United in earlier rounds. Town were defeated 3–2 by Charlton in a close contest where Yeovil had a shot cleared off the line in the later stages of the game. Yeovil picked up 31 points from a possible 60 after this point, but it was enough for them to secure the title, finishing five points above 4th placed Southend United. The Glovers scored 90 goals, 21 more than any other team whilst Striker Phil Jevons was League Two's top scorer. At the end of the season, the club released five players including Latvian international Andrejs Štolcers while Polish striker Bartosz Tarachulski rejected the club's offer of a new contract.

== Transfers ==
=== In ===
Date	Name	From	Fee	Ref
1 July 2004	Phil Jevons	Grimsby Town	Free	
1 July 2004	Adrian Caceres	Perth Glory	£20,000	
1 July 2004	Michael Rose	Hereford United	Free (released)	
22 July 2004	Nicolas Mirza	Paris Saint-Germain	Free (released)	
22 July 2004	Bartosz Tarachulski	Polonia Warsaw	Free (released)	
27 July 2004	Kezie Ibe	Staines Town	Free	
27 July 2004	Yemi Odubade	Eastbourne Town	Free	
2 September 2004	Andrejs Štolcers	Fulham	Free (released)	
16 December 2004	Arron Davies	Southampton	Undisclosed	
23 March 2005	Marcus Richardson	Lincoln City	Free (released)	
23 March 2005	Efe Sodje	Huddersfield Town	Free	
24 March 2005	Kevin Amankwaah	Bristol City	Undisclosed (~ £10,000)	
25 March 2005	Marvin Brown	Bristol City	Free (released)	

=== Out ===
Date	Name	To	Fee	Ref
13 September 2004	Simon Weatherstone	Hornchurch	Undisclosed	
8 December 2004	Gavin Williams	West Ham United	£250,000	
1 February 2005	Roy O'Brien	Weymouth	Free	
9 February 2005	Yemi Odubade	Eastbourne Borough	Free	
21 February 2005	Adrian Caceres	Aldershot Town	Contract terminated by mutual consent	
30 June 2005	Marvin Brown	Weston-super-Mare	Released	
30 June 2005	Kezie Ibe	Canvey Island	Released	
30 June 2005	Nicolas Mirza	Pacy Vallée-d'Eure	Released	
30 June 2005	Marcus Richardson	Chester City	Released	
30 June 2005	Andrejs Štolcers	FK Baku	Released	
30 June 2005	Bartosz Tarachulski	Dunfermline Athletic	Rejected new contract	

=== Loan in ===
Date	Name	From	End date	Ref
13 August 2004	Liam Fontaine	Fulham	6 November 2004	
3 February 2005	Kevin Amankwaah	Bristol City	24 March 2005	
22 February 2005	Rory Fallon	Swindon Town	21 March 2005	
21 March 2005	David Woozley	Oxford United	10 May 2005	

== Match results ==
=== League Two ===
League Two match details
Date	League position	Opponents	Venue	Result	Score F–A	Scorers	Attendance	Ref
7 August 2004	19th	Bury	A	L	1–3	Caceres	3,171	
10 August 2004	17th	Darlington	H	D	1–1	Jevons	5,116	
14 August 2004	9th	Boston United	H	W	2–0	Jevons, Tarachulski	5,178	
21 August 2004	5th	Notts County	A	W	2–1	Terry, Jevons	5,024	
28 August 2004	4th	Rushden & Diamonds	H	W	3–1	Johnson, Tarachulski, Jevons	5,088	
30 August 2004	8th	Mansfield Town	A	L	1–4	Skiverton	3,826	
4 September 2004	4th	Swansea City	H	W	1–0	G. Williams (pen)	5,826	
11 September 2004	6th	Cheltenham Town	A	D	1–1	Way	3,966	
18 September 2004	2nd	Oxford United	H	W	6–1	Štolcers (2), Jevons (3), Gall	5,467	
25 September 2004	1st	Shrewsbury Town	A	W	2–1	Johnson, Tarachulski	4,196	
2 October 2004	1st	Northampton Town	H	D	1–1	Jevons	5,944	
8 October 2004	3rd	Rochdale	A	L	1–2	Jevons	2,402	
16 October 2004	5th	Macclesfield Town	H	L	1–2	Way	5,313	
19 October 2004	4th	Bristol Rovers	A	D	2–2	Terry, G. Williams	9,295	
23 October 2004	8th	Scunthorpe United	A	L	0–1		4,470	
30 October 2004	4th	Chester City	H	W	4–1	Jevons (3, 2 pen), Caceres	5,741	
6 November 2004	3rd	Wycombe Wanderers	A	W	1–0	Tarachulski	5,453	
20 November 2004	3rd	Southend United	H	W	3–1	Jevons, Guyett, Tarachulski	5,839	
27 November 2004	3rd	Lincoln City	A	L	1–3	Skiverton	4,714	
7 December 2004	2nd	Kidderminster Harriers	H	W	2–1	Lindegaard, Štolcers	4,639	
11 December 2004	2nd	Grimsby Town	H	W	2–1	Johnson, Tarachulski	5,733	
18 December 2004	2nd	Leyton Orient	A	W	3–2	Tarachulski, Terry, Davies	3,867	
26 December 2004	2nd	Cheltenham Town	H	W	4–1	Gall, Jevons, Davies, Terry	7,320	
28 December 2004	2nd	Cambridge United	A	W	5–3	Jevons (2 pen), Way, Johnson, Štolcers	3,828	
1 January 2005	2nd	Swansea City	A	W	2–0	Štolcers, Jevons	11,225	
3 January 2005	1st	Shrewsbury Town	H	W	4–2	Way, Terry, Caceres, Gall	7,250	
15 January 2005	1st	Oxford United	A	L	1–2	Guyett	6,778	
22 January 2005	1st	Cambridge United	H	W	2–1	Terry, Jevons (pen)	6,204	
25 January 2005	1st	Rochdale	H	D	2–2	Tarachulski, Johnson (pen)	5,180	
5 February 2005	1st	Macclesfield Town	A	L	1–3	Whitaker (og)	2,471	
12 February 2005	1st	Bristol Rovers	H	W	4–2	Jevons (3, 1 pen), Tarachulski	9,153	
19 February 2005	1st	Chester City	A	W	2–0	Davies, Jevons (pen)	3,072	
22 February 2005	1st	Scunthorpe United	H	W	4–3	Tarachulski, Johnson, Fallon, Davies	7,598	
26 February 2005	1st	Grimsby Town	A	L	1–2	Davies	4,414	
1 March 2005	1st	Northampton Town	A	D	1–1	Davies	5,630	
5 March 2005	1st	Leyton Orient	H	W	1–0	Jevons (pen)	6,545	
12 March 2005	1st	Darlington	A	L	1–2	Way	4,121	
19 March 2005	1st	Bury	H	L	0–1		6,269	
26 March 2005	1st	Boston United	A	W	2–1	Skiverton (2)	3,069	
29 March 2005	1st	Notts County	H	L	1–3	Jevons (pen)	7,221	
2 April 2005	2nd	Rushden & Diamonds	A	L	0–2		3,726	
9 April 2005	1st	Mansfield Town	H	W	5–2	Davies, Way (2), Rose, Jevons	6,471	
16 April 2005	1st	Kidderminster Harriers	A	D	1–1	Davies	4,014	
23 April 2005	1st	Wycombe Wanderers	H	D	1–1	Johnson	7,421	
30 April 2005	1st	Southend United	A	W	1–0	Jevons	11,735	
7 May 2005	1st	Lincoln City	H	W	3–0	Sodje (2), Jevons (pen)	8,855	

==== League table ====
Pos	Team	Pld	W	D	L	GF	GA	GD	Pts	Promotion or relegation
1	Yeovil Town (C, P)	46	25	8	13	90	65	+25	83	Promotion to League One
2	Scunthorpe United (P)	46	22	14	10	69	42	+27	80	Promotion to League One
3	Swansea City (P)	46	24	8	14	62	43	+19	80	Promotion to League One
4	Southend United (O, P)	46	22	12	12	65	46	+19	78	Qualification for League Two play-offs
5	Macclesfield Town	46	22	9	15	60	49	+11	75	Qualification for League Two play-offs

Updated to match(es) played on 15 September 2009. Source: 2004–05 League Two
Rules for classification: 1) points; 2) goal difference; 3) number of goals scored.
(C) Champions; (O) Play-off winners; (P) Promoted

=== FA Cup ===
FA Cup match details
Round	Date	Opponents	Venue	Result	Score F–A	Scorers	Attendance	Ref
First round	13 November 2004	Darlington	A	D	3–3	Miles, Tarachulski (2)	3,698	
First round replay	23 November 2004	Darlington	H	W	1–0	Way	5,365	
Second round	4 December 2004	Histon	A	W	3–1	Jevons (pen), Johnson, Odubade	2,564	
Third round	8 January 2005	Rotherham United	A	W	3–0	Jevons (pen), Way, Štolcers	5,397	
Fourth round	29 January 2005	Charlton Athletic	A	L	2–3	Terry, Davies	22,873	

=== League Cup ===
League Cup match details
Round	Date	Opponents	Venue	Result	Score F–A	Scorers	Attendance	Ref
First round	24 August 2004	Plymouth Argyle	H	W	3–2^{[A]}	Johnson (3)	6,217	
Second round	21 September 2004	Bolton Wanderers	H	L	0–2		8,047	

=== Football League Trophy ===
Football League Trophy match details
Round	Date	Opponents	Venue	Result	Score F–A	Scorers	Attendance	Ref
First round	28 September 2004	Torquay United	A	L	3–4^{[B]}	Štolcers, Caceres, Tarachulski	1,610	

== Squad statistics ==
Numbers in parentheses denote appearances as substitute.
Players with squad numbers struck through and marked † left the club during the playing season.
Players with names in italics and marked * were on loan from another club for the whole of their season with Yeovil.
Players listed with no appearances have been in the matchday squad but only as unused substitutes.
Key to positions: GK – Goalkeeper; DF – Defender; MF – Midfielder; FW – Forward

No.	Pos.	Nat.	Name	Apps	Goals	Apps	Goals	Apps	Goals	Apps	Goals	Apps	Goals	Yellow card	Red card
No.	Pos.	Nat.	Name	League		FA Cup		League Cup		FL Trophy		Total		Discipline	
1	GK	ENG	Chris Weale	37 (1)	0	5	0	2	0	0	0	44 (1)	0	1	0
2	DF	ENG	Adam Lockwood	6 (4)	0	0	0	1	0	0	0	7 (4)	0	0	0
3	DF	ENG	Michael Rose	37 (4)	1	3 (1)	0	2	0	0 (1)	0	43 (5)	1	2	0
4	DF	ENG	Terry Skiverton	36 (2)	4	3	0	2	0	0	0	41 (2)	4	6	0
5	DF	ENG	Colin Miles	20 (1)	0	3	1	0	0	0	0	23 (1)	1	4	1
6	MF	ENG	Darren Way	45	7	5	2	2	0	0	0	52	9	4	0
7	MF	ENG	Paul Terry	35 (4)	6	4	1	1 (1)	0	1	0	41 (5)	7	4	0
8	MF	ENG	Lee Johnson	44	7	5	1	2	3	0 (1)	0	51 (1)	11	7	0
9	FW	WAL	Kevin Gall	30 (14)	3	4 (1)	0	1 (1)	0	1	0	36 (16)	3	0	0
~~10~~ †	MF	AUS	Adrian Caceres	7 (14)	3	0 (2)	0	2	0	1	1	10 (16)	4	1	0
~~10~~ †	FW	NZL	Rory Fallon *	2 (4)	1	0	0	0	0	0	0	2 (4)	1	0	0
10	FW	ENG	Marcus Richardson	2 (2)	0	0	0	0	0	0	0	2 (2)	0	0	0
11	FW	ENG	Phil Jevons	45 (1)	27	4	2	2	0	0	0	51 (1)	29	4	0
~~12~~ †	MF	ENG	Simon Weatherstone	0 (6)	0	0	0	0 (1)	0	0	0	0 (7)	0	0	0
12	DF	ENG	Kevin Amankwaah	10 (5)	0	0	0	0	0	0	0	10 (5)	0	1	0
13	GK	ENG	Steve Collis	9	0	0	0	0	0	1	0	10	0	0	0
~~14~~ †	DF	IRL	Roy O'Brien	10 (4)	0	0 (1)	0	1 (1)	0	1	0	12 (6)	0	1	0
14	DF	NGA	Efe Sodje	6	2	0	0	0	0	0	0	6	2	2	0
15	DF	ENG	Stephen Reed	1 (2)	0	0	0	0	0	0	0	0	0	0	0
16	MF	ENG	Andy Lindegaard	19 (10)	1	3 (1)	0	0	0	1	0	23 (11)	1	5	0
17	DF	AUS	Scott Guyett	13 (5)	2	5	0	0	0	0	0	18 (5)	2	2	0
18	FW	POL	Bartosz Tarachulski	27 (15)	10	5	2	1 (1)	0	1	1	34 (16)	13	8	0
19	FW	WAL	Dale Williams	0	0	0	0	0	0	0	0	0	0	0	0
~~20~~ †	MF	WAL	Gavin Williams	12 (1)	2	2	0	0 (1)	0	0	0	14 (2)	2	1	1
22	FW	ENG	Kezie Ibe	0 (3)	0	0	0	0	0	0	0	0 (3)	0	0	0
23	MF	FRA	Nicolas Mirza	0 (3)	0	0	0	0	0	1	0	1 (3)	0	0	0
~~24~~ †	FW	NGA	Yemi Odubade	0 (4)	0	0 (1)	1	0	0	0 (1)	0	0 (6)	1	0	0
~~25~~ †	DF	ENG	Liam Fontaine *	15	0	0	0	2	0	1	0	18	0	0	0
25	MF	WAL	Arron Davies	15 (7)	8	0 (2)	1	0	0	0	0	15 (9)	9	0	0
26	DF	ENG	David Woozley *	0 (1)	0	0	0	0	0	0	0	0 (1)	0	0	0
27	MF	LAT	Andrejs Štolcers	23 (13)	5	4 (1)	1	1	0	1	1	29 (14)	7	4	0
28	FW	ENG	Marvin Brown	0 (2)	0	0	0	0	0	0	0	0 (2)	0	0	0

Players not included in matchday squads
No.	Pos.	Nat.	Name
21	MF	ENG	Steve Thompson

== Footnotes ==
A. Yeovil Town won 3–2 after extra time.
B. Torquay United won 4–3 after extra time.

== See also ==
- 2004–05 in English football
- List of Yeovil Town F.C. seasons
