= Ben Hedley =

English footballer (born 1998)

Personal information
- Full name: Ben Hedley
- Date of birth: 18 October 1998 (age 28)
- Place of birth: Gateshead, England
- Position: Midfielder

Team information
- Current team: Darlington
- Number: 2

Youth career
- –2017: Morecambe

Senior career*
Years	Team	Apps	(Gls)
2017–2019	Morecambe	2	(0)
2017	→ Witton Albion (loan)	17	(1)
2019	Bradford (Park Avenue)	7	(0)
2019–	Darlington	181	(1)
- * Club domestic league appearances and goals as of 18:28, 29 November 2025 (UTC)

Ben Hedley (born 18 October 1998) is an English professional footballer who plays as a midfielder for National League North club Darlington. He previously played in the Football League for Morecambe, as well as in non-league football for Witton Albion and Bradford (Park Avenue).

== Playing career ==
Hedley came through the Morecambe Academy to make his first-team debut on 6 May 2017, coming on as an 88th-minute substitute for Aaron Wildig in a 3–1 defeat at Luton Town. He signed his first professional contract with the club the following month.

On 15 August 2017, he joined Northern Premier League Premier Division club Witton Albion on an initial one-month loan; "Shrimps" manager Jim Bentley said that "he'll be in good hands at Witton with the management (Carl MacCauley and Gary Martindale) who are both good football people that I trust to do right by Ben". His loan spell was extended into a second month after he impressed in his first eight starts for the club, and was extended a second time. He scored his first senior goal on 14 October in a 5–2 victory over Coalville Town at Wincham Park, and finished the loan spell with 19 appearances in all competitions.

Hedley was named Morecambe's Reserve Team Player of the Year for 2017–18. In 2018–19, he featured twice in the EFL Trophy, and made his first Football League start on 23 October 2018 in a 1–0 defeat at home to Mansfield Town; the Lancashire Post described it as a "solid debut". Despite being named as a substitute on 38 occasions, he made no more league appearances and was released at the end of the season.

On 7 June 2019, Hedley joined National League North club Bradford (Park Avenue), managed by Garry Thompson with whom he had played at Morecambe. Thompson was dismissed just two matches into the season, and Hedley played in seven before leaving for another National League North club, Darlington, in early September.

== Career statistics ==
As of end of 2024–25 season

Appearances and goals by club, season and competition
Club	Season	League			FA Cup		League cup (Note: Includes EFL Cup, Northern League Challenge Cup)		Other		Total	
Club	Season	Division	Apps	Goals	Apps	Goals	Apps	Goals	Apps	Goals	Apps	Goals
Morecambe	2016–17	League Two	1	0	0	0	0	0	0	0	1	0
Morecambe	2017–18	League Two	0	0	0	0	0	0	0	0	0	0
Morecambe	2018–19	League Two	1	0	0	0	0	0	2 (Note: Appearances in EFL Trophy)	0	3	0
Morecambe	Total		2	0	0	0	0	0	2	0	4	0
Witton Albion (loan)	2017–18	NPL Premier Division	17	1	0	0	1	0	1 (Note: Appearance(s) in FA Trophy)	0	19	1
Bradford (Park Avenue)	2019–20	National League North	7	0	—		—		—		7	0
Darlington	2019–20	National League North	22	0	5	0	—		4	0	31	0
Darlington	2020–21	National League North	5	0	3	0	—		2	0	10	0
Darlington	2021–22	National League North	34	0	1	0	—		1	0	36	0
Darlington	2022–23	National League North	40	0	2	0	—		3	1	45	1
Darlington	2023–24	National League North	34	0	2	0	—		1	0	37	0
Darlington	2024–25	National League North	30	0	0	0	—		0	0	30	0
Darlington	Total		165	0	13	0	—		11	1	189	1
Career total			191	1	13	0	1	0	14	1	219	2
