= Yawson =

Yawson is a Ghanaian surname. Notable people with the surname include:

- Helen Yawson (born 1967), Ghanaian gospel singer
- Janet Yawson (born 1967), Ghanaian long jumper
- Steven Yawson (born 1999), English footballer
- Prince Yawson (1957–2022), Ghanaian actor and comedian
- John Nketia Yawson, Ghanaian footballer
