= 2021–22 Walsall F.C. season =

Walsall
2021–22 season
- Chairman: Leigh Pomlett
- Head Coach: Matthew Taylor (until 9 February); Michael Flynn (from 15 February)
- Stadium: Bescot Stadium
- League Two: 16th
- FA Cup: Second round
- EFL Cup: First round
- EFL Trophy: Second round
- Top goalscorer: League: George Miller (12); All: George Miller (12)
Home colours	Away colours	Third colours

The 2021–22 season was Walsall's 134th year in their history and third consecutive season in League Two. Along with the league, the club competed in the FA Cup, the EFL Cup and the EFL Trophy. The season covers the period from 1 July 2021 to 30 June 2022.

== Pre-season friendlies ==
Walsall announced they would play friendlies against Leamington, Crystal Palace, Aston Villa, Kidderminster Harriers, West Bromwich Albion and Cheltenham Town as part of the pre-season preparations.

17 July 2021 Friendly	Walsall	0–1	Crystal Palace	Bescot
13:00 BST		Report	Zaha 41'	Stadium: Bescot Stadium

21 July 2021 Friendly	Walsall	0–4	Aston Villa	Bescot
19:30 BST		Report	Watkins 26', 38'; Philogene 51'; Ramsey 58'	Stadium: Bescot Stadium; Attendance: 6,562

24 July 2021 Friendly	Kidderminster Harriers	0–5	Walsall	Kidderminster
15:00 BST		Report	Osadebe 38', 45'; Wilkinson 47'; Phillips 57'; Kiernan 78'	Stadium: Aggborough Stadium

27 July 2021 Friendly	Walsall	Postponed	West Bromwich Albion	Bescot
19:30 BST				Stadium: Bescot Stadium
Note: Match postponed due to a waterlogged pitch that was deemed unsafe to play.

31 July 2021 Friendly	Cheltenham Town	2–0	Walsall	Cheltenham
15:00 BST	Blair 50'; Raglan 67'	Report		Stadium: Whaddon Road

== Competitions ==
=== League Two ===
==== League table ====
Pos	Team	Pld	W	D	L	GF	GA	GD	Pts
13	Leyton Orient	46	14	16	16	62	47	+15	58
14	Bradford City	46	14	16	16	53	55	−2	58
15	Colchester United	46	14	13	19	48	60	−12	55
16	Walsall	46	14	12	20	47	60	−13	54
17	Hartlepool United	46	14	12	20	44	64	−20	54
18	Rochdale	46	12	17	17	51	59	−8	53
19	Harrogate Town	46	14	11	21	64	75	−11	53

Source: EFL Official Website
Rules for classification: 1) Points; 2) Goal difference; 3) Number of goals scored; 4) Head-to-head results; 5) Wins; 6) Away goals; 7) Penalty points (sec 9.5); 8) 12-point sending off offences

==== Results summary ====
Overall								Home						Away					
Pld	W	D	L	GF	GA	GD	Pts	W	D	L	GF	GA	GD	W	D	L	GF	GA	GD
46	14	12	20	47	60	−13	54	10	5	8	30	29	+1	4	7	12	17	31	−14

Last updated: 7 May 2022.

==== Results by matchday ====
Matchday	1	2	3	4	5	6	7	8	9	10	11	12	13	14	15	16	17	18	19	20	21	22	23	24	25	26	27	28	29	30	31	32	33	34	35	36	37	38	39	40	41	42	43	44	45	46
Ground	A	H	H	A	H	A	H	A	H	A	H	A	A	H	A	H	H	A	A	H	H	H	A	A	H	H	A	H	A	H	A	A	H	A	A	H	H	A	A	H	A	H	A	H	A	H
Result	L	L	D	L	W	D	W	L	L	D	W	D	W	D	W	L	D	W	L	D	W	D	L	L	L	L	L	L	L	W	W	L	W	D	D	W	W	D	L	L	L	W	L	W	D	L
Position	23	24	23	23	21	21	16	19	22	21	19	18	16	14	14	15	15	11	14	12	12	13	15	15	17	17	19	21	21	18	16	17	17	16	16	16	14	14	16	17	18	15	16	14	15	16

Updated to match(es) played on 7 May 2022. Source: Statto.com
A = Away; H = Home; W = Win; D = Draw; L = Loss

==== Matches ====
The Saddlers league fixtures were released on 24 June 2021.

7 August 2021 1	Tranmere Rovers	1–0	Walsall	Birkenhead
15:00 BST	McManaman (yellow card) 42', (goal) 73'; Davies (yellow card) 67'; Merrie (red card) 86'; Murphy (yellow card) 87'	Report	Taylor (yellow card) 15'; Labadie (yellow card) 90+2'	Stadium: Prenton Park; Attendance: 7,728; Referee: Carl Brook

14 August 2021 2	Walsall	1–3	Forest Green Rovers	Bescot
15:00 BST	Wilkinson (yellow card) 77'; Kiernan 90+2'	Report	Stevens 20', 45+3' (pen.); Bernard (yellow card) 31'; Cadden (yellow card) 31'; Matt 43'; Hendry (yellow card) 45'	Stadium: Bescot Stadium; Attendance: 4,310; Referee: Simon Mather

17 August 2021 3	Walsall	1–1	Scunthorpe United	Bescot
19:45 BST	White (yellow card) 33'; Phillips 47'	Report	Pugh (yellow card) 79'; Beestin 90', (yellow card) 90+1'	Stadium: Bescot Stadium; Attendance: 4,009; Referee: Craig Hicks

21 August 2021 4	Hartlepool United	2–0	Walsall	Hartlepool
15:00 BST	Burey 23'; Featherstone 57' (pen.); Francis-Angol (yellow card) 68'; Goodwin (yellow card) 85'; Liddle (yellow card) 90'	Report	Menayese (yellow card) 32'	Stadium: Victoria Park; Attendance: 4,677; Referee: Declan Bourne

28 August 2021 5	Walsall	1–0	Stevenage	Bescot
15:00 BST	Wilkinson 5'; Labadie (yellow card) 63'	Report	Vancooten (yellow card) 84'	Stadium: Bescot Stadium; Attendance: 4,257; Referee: Andrew Kitchen

4 September 2021 6	Bradford City	1–1	Walsall	Bradford
15:00 BST	Watt 14'	Report	Earing 42'; Labadie (red card) 43'; White (yellow card) 81'	Stadium: Valley Parade; Attendance: 15,822; Referee: Ben Toner

11 September 2021 7	Walsall	3–1	Mansfield Town	Bescot
15:00 BST	Miller 6', 48'; Taylor 22'; Monthé (yellow card) 83'	Report	Hewitt (yellow card) 44'; Hawkins (yellow card) 83'; Johnson 84'	Stadium: Bescot Stadium; Attendance: 5,203; Referee: David Rock

18 September 2021 8	Newport County	2–1	Walsall	Newport
15:00 BST	Demetriou 9'; Upson (yellow card) 18'; Dolan (penalty missed) 45+1'; Clarke 87'	Report	Shade 45+2'	Stadium: Rodney Parade; Attendance: 3,825; Referee: Lee Swabey

25 September 2021 9	Walsall	1–2	Bristol Rovers	Bescot
15:00 BST	Earing (yellow card) 26'; Phillips 32'; White (yellow card) 85'	Report	Taylor (yellow card) 57', (goal) 79'; Harries (yellow card) 66'; Spence 90+1'	Stadium: Bescot Stadium; Attendance: 5,434; Referee: Seb Stockbridge

2 October 2021 10	Exeter City	2–2	Walsall	Exeter
15:00 BST	Dieng 5', (yellow card) 59'; Jay (penalty missed) 49'; Nombe 61'	Report	Miller 37' (pen.), 70'; Ward (yellow card) 90'	Stadium: St James Park; Attendance: 4,839; Referee: Peter Wright

9 October 2021 11	Walsall	2–1	Salford City	Bescot
15:00 BST	Phillips 1'; Labadie (yellow card) 31'; Wilkinson 90+5'; Menayese (yellow card) 90+6'	Report	Lund (yellow card) 73'; Eastham 78'; Hunter (yellow card) 79'	Stadium: Bescot Stadium; Attendance: 5,005; Referee: Trevor Kettle

16 October 2021 12	Leyton Orient	0–0	Walsall	Leyton
15:00 BST	Smith (yellow card) 67'; Smyth (yellow card) 84'	Report		Stadium: Brisbane Road; Attendance: 5,826; Referee: Ollie Yates

19 October 2021 13	Oldham Athletic	1–3	Walsall	Oldham
19:45 GMT	Bowden (yellow card) 27'; Hope 67'; Whelan (yellow card) 76'	Report	Labadie (yellow card) 9'; Earing 33'; Miller 43'; Osadebe 85'	Stadium: Boundary Park; Attendance: 3,762; Referee: Ross Joyce

23 October 2021 14	Walsall	2–2	Barrow	Bescot
15:00 BST	Miller 4', 62', (yellow card) 90+3'; White (yellow card) 90+2'	Report	Banks (yellow card) 24'; Grayson (yellow card) 29'; Brough (yellow card) 32'; Williams 36'; Stevens (yellow card) 53'; Kay (yellow card) 63'; Gordon 90+6'	Stadium: Bescot Stadium; Attendance: 4,508; Referee: Andy Haines

30 October 2021 15	Sutton United	0–1	Walsall	Sutton
15:00 BST		Report	Labadie (yellow card) 43'; Shade 66'; Perry (yellow card) 90+2'	Stadium: Gander Green Lane; Attendance: 3,319; Referee: Carl Boyeson

13 November 2021 16	Walsall	1–3	Harrogate Town	Bescot
15:00 GMT	White (yellow card) 73'; Phillips 88'	Report	Falkingham (yellow card) 17'; Power 20'; Diamond 61'; Armstrong 82'	Stadium: Bescot Stadium; Attendance: 4,651; Referee: Marc Edwards

20 November 2021 17	Walsall	0–0	Rochdale	Bescot
15:00 GMT	Monthé (yellow card) 54'	Report	Dorsett (yellow card) 51'	Stadium: Bescot Stadium; Attendance: 6,144; Referee: Sam Purkiss

23 November 2021 18	Port Vale	0–1	Walsall	Burslem
19:45 GMT	Gibbons (yellow card) 52'; Conlon (yellow card) 53' (yellow-red card) 72'; Smith (yellow card) 90+1'	Report	Menayese (yellow card) 11'; Kiernan 29'; White (yellow card) 52'; Earing (yellow card) 68'; Shade (yellow card) 90+2'	Stadium: Vale Park; Attendance: 6,248; Referee: Simon Mather

27 November 2021 19	Carlisle United	1–0	Walsall	Carlisle
15:00 GMT	Guy (yellow card) 70'; Armer (yellow card) 75'; Abrahams 88'	Report	Menayese (yellow card) 88'	Stadium: Brunton Park; Attendance: 3,795; Referee: Scott Oldham

7 December 2021 20	Walsall	1–1	Crawley Town	Bescot
19:45 GMT	Labadie (yellow card) 39'; Kiernan 41'; Menayese (yellow card) 51'; Kinsella (yellow card) 81'	Report	Craig (yellow card) 11'; Nichols 45+1'	Stadium: Bescot Stadium; Attendance: 3,609; Referee: James Bell

11 December 2021 21	Walsall	3–0	Colchester United	Bescot
15:00 GMT	Khan 22', 32'; Earing 66'; Ward (yellow card) 78'	Report		Stadium: Bescot Stadium; Attendance: 4,065; Referee: Martin Coy

1 January 2022 22	Walsall	3–3	Newport County	Bescot
15:00 GMT	Wilkinson 53', 90+5'; Labadie (yellow card) 64'; Dolan 65' (o.g.)	Report	Telford 4', 66'; Wilkinson 56' (o.g.); Baker-Richardson (yellow card) 59'	Stadium: Bescot Stadium; Attendance: 4,946; Referee: Rebecca Welch

8 January 2022 23	Stevenage	3–1	Walsall	Stevenage
15:00 GMT	Menayese 1' (o.g.); Lines 8'; Cuthbert (yellow card) 35'; Prosser (yellow card) 74'; Taylor 90+4'	Report	Menayese (yellow card) 27'; Kiernan 70'; Wilkinson (yellow card) 76'	Stadium: Broadhall Way; Attendance: 2,167; Referee: James Oldham

15 January 2022 24	Mansfield Town	2–0	Walsall	Mansfield
15:00 GMT	Hawkins (yellow card) 45+1'; Charsley 58', 89'	Report		Stadium: Field Mill; Attendance: 5,728; Referee: Ross Joyce

22 January 2022 25	Walsall	0–2	Exeter City	Bescot
15:00 GMT	Menayese (yellow card) 45+3' (yellow-red card) 50'; White (yellow card) 76'	Report	Dieng 44'; Stubbs (yellow card) 46'; Diabate 84', (yellow card) 85'	Stadium: Bescot Stadium; Attendance: 4,750; Referee: Darren Handley

25 January 2022 26	Walsall	1–2	Bradford City	Bescot
19:45 GMT	Kinsella (yellow card) 30'; Miller 57'; White (yellow card) 86'; Mills (yellow card) 87'; Wilkinson (yellow card) 87'	Report	Daly 37'; Walker (yellow card) 56'; Songo'o (yellow card) 62'; Cook 88' (pen.)	Stadium: Bescot Stadium; Attendance: 4,097; Referee: Ben Speedie

29 January 2022 27	Bristol Rovers	1–0	Walsall	Horfield
15:00 GMT	Hoole (yellow card) 34' (yellow-red card) 38'; Coutts (yellow card) 57'; Collins 90'	Report	White (yellow card) 5'; Wilkinson (yellow card) 34'; Labadie (yellow card) 60'; Kiernan (yellow card) 63'; Osadebe (yellow card) 90+8'	Stadium: Memorial Stadium; Attendance: 8,003; Referee: Keith Stroud

5 February 2022 28	Walsall	0–1	Northampton Town	Bescot
15:00 GMT	Kinsella (yellow card) 66'; Labadie (yellow card) 88'	Report	Appéré 10', (yellow card) 65'; McWilliams (yellow card) 88'	Stadium: Bescot Stadium; Attendance: 5,315; Referee: Seb Stockbridge

8 February 2022 29	Scunthorpe United	1–0	Walsall	Scunthorpe
19:45 GMT	Pugh (yellow card) 29' (yellow-red card) 53'; Rowe 34'	Report	Labadie (yellow card) 81'	Stadium: Glanford Park; Attendance: 2,123; Referee: Tom Nield

12 February 2022 30	Walsall	1–0	Tranmere Rovers	Bescot
15:00 GMT	Kinsella (yellow card) 24'; Miller (yellow card) 28'; Wilkinson 85' (pen.)	Report	Warrington (yellow card) 47'	Stadium: Bescot Stadium; Attendance: 5,440; Referee: Sam Allison

19 February 2022 31	Forest Green Rovers	0–1	Walsall	Nailsworth
15:00 GMT	Adams (yellow card) 17'; Cargill (yellow card) 81'; Cadden (yellow card) 90'	Report	Miller 12'; Kinsella (yellow card) 21'; Menayese (yellow card) 45+1'	Stadium: The New Lawn; Attendance: 3,122; Referee: Alan Young

22 February 2022 32	Swindon Town	5–0	Walsall	Swindon
19:45 GMT	Barry 36', 63'; Aguiar 45+2', 56'; Williams 71'	Report	Menayese (yellow card) 55'; Monthé (yellow card) 87'	Stadium: The County Ground; Attendance: 9,840; Referee: Brett Huxtable

26 February 2022 33	Walsall	3–1	Hartlepool United	Bescot
15:00 GMT	Miller 13', 67'; Wilkinson 26'	Report	Bogle 63'	Stadium: Bescot Stadium; Attendance: 4,760; Referee: Lee Swabey

1 March 2022 34	Northampton Town	1–1	Walsall	Northampton
19:45 GMT	Pinnock 4'; Magloire (yellow card) 48'; Mills (yellow card) 62'; Lewis (yellow card) 70'	Report	Labadie (yellow card) 29'; Wilkinson 50'	Stadium: Sixfields Stadium; Attendance: 4,861; Referee: Paul Howard

5 March 2022 35	Barrow	1–1	Walsall	Barrow-in-Furness
15:00 GMT	Rooney 35'; Platt (yellow card) 82'	Report	Monthé (yellow card) 19'; Tomlin (yellow card) 20'; Daniels 67'	Stadium: Holker Street; Attendance: 3,439; Referee: Leigh Doughty

12 March 2022 36	Walsall	1–0	Sutton United	Bescot
15:00 GMT	Wilkinson 33' (pen.); Daniels (yellow card) 75'	Report	Milsom (yellow card) 62'; Wyatt (yellow card) 82'; Eastmond (yellow card) 88'	Stadium: Bescot Stadium; Attendance: 5,801; Referee: Scott Oldham

15 March 2022 37	Walsall	2–1	Oldham Athletic	Bescot
19:45 GMT	Osadebe 32'; Labadie (yellow card) 61'; Wilkinson 73', (yellow card) 89'; Rushworth (yellow card) 90+3'	Report	Sutton 21', (yellow card) 82'; Piergianni (yellow card) 75'	Stadium: Bescot Stadium; Attendance: 4,339; Referee: Ollie Yates

19 March 2022 38	Harrogate Town	1–1	Walsall	Harrogate
15:00 GMT	Sheron (yellow card) 9'; Richards (yellow card) 69'; Diamond (yellow card) 80'; Thomson (yellow card) 90+2'; Kavanagh 90+4'	Report	Kinsella (yellow card) 23'; Wilkinson 60' (pen.), (yellow card) 87'; White (yellow card) 77'; Rodney (yellow card) 88'	Stadium: Wetherby Road; Attendance: 2,570; Referee: Declan Bourne

26 March 2022 39	Salford City	2–1	Walsall	Salford
15:00 GMT	Turnbull (yellow card) 33'; Smith 45'; Watson 66' (pen.)	Report	Menayese 34'; Rodney (yellow card) 55'; Kinsella (yellow card) 72'; Monthé (yellow card) 83'	Stadium: Moor Lane; Attendance: 2,584; Referee: Anthony Backhouse

2 April 2022 40	Walsall	0–2	Leyton Orient	Bescot
15:00 BST		Report	Smith 10', (yellow card) 40'; Khan 16'; Beckles (yellow card) 63'; Sotiriou (yellow card) 73'	Stadium: Bescot Stadium; Attendance: 4,849; Referee: Andy Haines

9 April 2022 41	Rochdale	1–0	Walsall	Rochdale
15:00 BST	Grant 55'	Report	Perry (yellow card) 45+1'; Labadie (yellow card) 73'; Wilkinson (yellow card) 86'	Stadium: Spotland Stadium; Attendance: 2,437; Referee: Adam Herczeg

15 April 2022 42	Walsall	1–0	Carlisle United	Bescot
15:00 BST	White (yellow card) 11'; Earing 45+2'; Kiernan (yellow card) 61'; Rushworth (yellow card) 90+6'	Report	Simeu (yellow card) 7'	Stadium: Bescot Stadium; Attendance: 5,114; Referee: Martin Woods

18 April 2022 43	Crawley Town	1–0	Walsall	Crawley
15:00 BST	Hutchinson 69'	Report		Stadium: Broadfield Stadium; Attendance: 2,258; Referee: Peter Wright

23 April 2022 44	Walsall	2–0	Port Vale	Bescot
15:00 BST	White (yellow card) 45+3'; Perry 67'; Menayese (yellow card) 83'; Osadebe 90+3'	Report	Smith (yellow card) 52'	Stadium: Bescot Stadium; Attendance: 6,840; Referee: Tom Nield

30 April 2022 45	Colchester United	2–2	Walsall	Colchester
15:00 BST	Sears 24', 56' (pen.)	Report	Kiernan 39'; Miller 48'; Monthé (yellow card) 83'	Stadium: Colchester Community Stadium; Attendance: 3,520; Referee: Dean Whitestone

7 May 2022 46	Walsall	0–3	Swindon Town	Bescot
15:00 BST	Daniels (yellow card) 45+2'; Monthé (yellow card) 73'	Report	McKirdy 3'; Payne 25', 45+3' (pen.); Williams (yellow card) 53'; Reed (yellow card) 70'	Stadium: Bescot Stadium; Attendance: 9,089; Referee: Sam Barrott

=== FA Cup ===
Walsall were drawn away to King's Lynn Town in the first round and at home to Swindon Town in the second round.

6 November 2021 First round	King's Lynn Town	0–1	Walsall	King's Lynn
15:00 GMT	Barrows (yellow card) 18'; Fernandez (yellow card) 39'	Report	Kiernan 15', (yellow card) 38'	Stadium: The Walks; Attendance: 1,934; Referee: Robert Lewis

4 December 2021 Second round	Walsall	1–2	Swindon Town	Bescot
15:00 GMT	Osadebe 37'; White (yellow card) 42'; Monthé (yellow card) 56'; Khan (yellow card) 89'	Report	Simpson 16'; McKirdy (yellow card) 48'; Reed (yellow card) 50'; Kesler Hayden 67'	Stadium: Bescot Stadium; Attendance: 4,331; Referee: Peter Wright

=== EFL Cup ===
10 August 2021 First round	Walsall	0–0 (3–4 p)	Doncaster Rovers	Bescot
19:45 BST	Osadebe (yellow card) 60'	Report	Close (yellow card) 36'; Greaves (red card) 88'	Stadium: Bescot Stadium; Attendance: 2,384; Referee: John Busby
	Penalties
	Wilkinson (penalty scored); Phillips (penalty scored); Osadebe (penalty missed); Earing (penalty missed); Kiernan (penalty missed); Ward (penalty scored); Kinsella (penalty missed)		Gardner (penalty missed); Close (penalty scored); Cukur (penalty missed); Williams (penalty missed); Barlow (penalty scored); Anderson (penalty scored); Knoyle (penalty scored)

=== EFL Trophy ===
Saddlers were drawn into Southern Group D alongside Forest Green Rovers and Northampton Town. Group stage ties were confirmed on 1 July.

Pos	Div	Team	Pld	W	PW	PL	L	GF	GA	GD	Pts	Qualification
1	L2	Forest Green Rovers	3	1	1	1	0	5	3	+2	6	Advance to Round 2
2	L2	Walsall	3	1	1	0	1	2	3	−1	5	Advance to Round 2
3	ACA	Brighton & Hove Albion U21	3	1	0	1	1	4	4	0	4	
4	L2	Northampton Town	3	0	1	1	1	3	4	−1	3	

Source: EFL.com

14 September 2021 Group game 1	Walsall	1–0	Brighton & Hove Albion U21	Bescot
19:00 BST	Phillips 44'	Report	Dicker (red card) 60'	Stadium: Bescot Stadium; Attendance: 1,229; Referee: Antony Coggins

5 October 2021 Group game 2	Northampton Town	1–1 (2–4 p)	Walsall	Northampton
19:00 BST	Horsfall (yellow card) 63'; Connolly 72' (pen.); Flores (yellow card) 73'; Ashley-Seal (yellow card) 82'; McWilliams (yellow card) 88'	Report	Osadebe 4'; Monthé (yellow card) 10'; Mills (yellow card) 19'; Bates (yellow card) 35'; Menayese (yellow card) 81'	Stadium: Sixfields Stadium; Attendance: 1,285; Referee: Charles Breakspear
	Penalties
	Pinnock (penalty missed); Connolly (penalty scored); Etete (penalty missed); Flores (penalty scored)		Earing (penalty scored); Shade (penalty scored); Labadie (penalty scored); Phillips (penalty scored)

9 November 2021 Group game 3	Walsall	0–2	Forest Green Rovers	Bescot
19:00 GMT	Khan (yellow card) 60'; Labadie (yellow card) 82'; Menayese (yellow card) 86'	Report	Stevens 15'; Bunker (yellow card) 36'; Evans (yellow card) 77'; Hendry (yellow card) 81'; Young 88'	Stadium: Bescot Stadium; Attendance: 1,778; Referee: Tom Reeves

30 November 2021 Second round	Cambridge United	2–0	Walsall	Cambridge
19:00 GMT	Smith 18' (pen.); Iredale (yellow card) 55'; Simper (yellow card) 69'; Tracey 80'	Report	Monthé (yellow card) 17'; White (yellow card) 21'; Phillips (penalty missed) 34'	Stadium: Abbey Stadium; Attendance: 780; Referee: Will Finnie

== Transfers ==
=== Transfers in ===
Date	Position	Nationality	Name	From	Fee	Ref.
18 June 2021	CM	(England)	Jack Earing	(England) FC Halifax Town	Compensation	
1 July 2021	RB	(England)	Danny Coogan	(England) Rushall Olympic	Free transfer	
1 July 2021	RM	(England)	Brendan Kiernan	(England) Harrogate Town	Free transfer	
1 July 2021	CM	(England)	Joss Labadie	(Wales) Newport County	Free transfer	
1 July 2021	CB	(Cameroon)	Manny Monthé	(England) Tranmere Rovers	Free transfer	
1 July 2021	CF	(Republic of Ireland)	Conor Wilkinson	(England) Leyton Orient	Free transfer	
7 July 2021	CB	(Wales)	Ash Taylor	(Scotland) Aberdeen	Free transfer	
8 July 2021	RB	(England)	Zak Mills	(England) Port Vale	Free transfer	
9 July 2021	LB	(Republic of Ireland)	Stephen Ward	(England) Ipswich Town	Free transfer	
18 October 2021	LW	(England)	Otis Khan	(England) Tranmere Rovers	Free transfer	
4 January 2022	CB	(Wales)	Rollin Menayese	(England) Mansfield Town	Undisclosed	
24 January 2022	CB	(Montserrat)	Donervon Daniels	(England) Crewe Alexandra	Free transfer	
28 January 2022	RW	(England)	Devante Rodney	(England) Port Vale	Undisclosed	
25 February 2022	SS	(England)	Lee Tomlin	(Wales) Cardiff City	Free transfer	

=== Loans in ===
Date from	Position	Nationality	Name	From	Date until	Ref.
12 July 2021	CF	(England)	Kieran Phillips	(England) Huddersfield Town	28 January 2021	(Note: On 28 January 2022, despite initially signing on a season long loan, Kieran Phillips was recalled early by his parent club Huddersfield Town.)
14 July 2021	GK	(England)	Carl Rushworth	(England) Brighton & Hove Albion	End of season	
16 July 2021	CB	(Wales)	Rollin Menayese	(England) Mansfield Town	4 January 2022	(Note: On 4 January 2022, Rollin Menayese joined from Mansfield Town on a permanent basis.)
3 August 2021	CF	(Saint Kitts and Nevis)	Tyrese Shade	(England) Leicester City	End of season	
31 August 2021	CF	(England)	George Miller	(England) Barnsley	End of season	
28 January 2022	LB	(England)	Reece Devine	(England) Manchester United	End of season	

=== Loans out ===
Date from	Position	Nationality	Name	To	Date until	Ref.
30 July 2021	RB	(England)	Joe Foulkes	(England) Kidderminster Harriers	End of season	(Note: On 5 January 2022, Foulkes' loan stay at Kidderminster was extended until the season ends.)
7 October 2021	CM	(England)	Joe Willis	(England) Leamington	November 2021	
19 November 2021	CM	(England)	Joe Willis	(England) Bromsgrove Sporting	9 January 2022	

=== Transfers out ===
Date	Position	Nationality	Name	To	Fee	Ref.
22 June 2021	GK	(England)	Liam Roberts	(England) Northampton Town	Compensation	
30 June 2021	CB	(England)	James Clarke	(Wales) Newport County	Released	
30 June 2021	LB	(Republic of Ireland)	Callum Cockerill-Mollett	(England) Tamworth	Released	
30 June 2021	CF	(England)	Josh Gordon	(England) Barrow	Released	
30 June 2021	CF	(Northern Ireland)	Caolan Lavery	(England) Bradford City	Released	
30 June 2021	RW	(England)	Wes McDonald	(England) Morecambe	Released	
30 June 2021	LW	(England)	Jack Nolan	(England) Accrington Stanley	Released	
30 June 2021	RB	(England)	Cameron Norman	(Wales) Newport County	Released	
30 June 2021	CB	(England)	Dan Scarr	(England) Plymouth Argyle	Free transfer	
30 June 2021	CM	(England)	Stuart Sinclair		Released	
13 August 2021	LB	(England)	Jack Lynch	(England) Coleshill Town	Free transfer	
19 August 2021	CF	(England)	Ade Francis	(Gibraltar) Europa Point	Free transfer	
3 October 2021	DM	(England)	Ben Dallaywaters	(Gibraltar) Europa Point	Free transfer	
23 October 2021	RB	(England)	Danny Coogan	(England) Halesowen Town	Free transfer	
14 January 2022	CB	(Wales)	Ash Taylor	(Scotland) Kilmarnock	Mutual consent	
19 January 2022	LW	(England)	Otis Khan	(England) Leyton Orient	Contract expiry	
29 January 2022	DF	(England)	Alex Worley	(Wales) Haverfordwest County	Free transfer	
22 February 2022	CM	(England)	Alfie Bates	(Finland) SJK Seinäjoki	Undisclosed	
