= Jason Oswell =

English footballer (born 1992)

Personal information
- Date of birth: 7 October 1992 (age 34)
- Place of birth: Northwich, England
- Height: 6 ft 2 in (1.88 m)
- Position: Striker

Youth career
- Crewe Alexandra

Senior career*
Years	Team	Apps	(Gls)
2011–2012	Crewe Alexandra	0	(0)
2011	→ Market Drayton Town (loan)		
2011	→ Nantwich Town (loan)		
2011–2012	→ Rhyl (loan)		
2012–2013	Inverness Caledonian Thistle	2	(0)
2013	Nantwich Town		
2013	Witton Albion		
2013	APIA Leichhardt Tigers	13	(4)
2013–2014	Rhyl	14	(3)
2014	Airbus UK Broughton	5	(0)
2014–2017	Newtown	94	(50)
2017–2018	Stockport County	40	(25)
2018–2019	Morecambe	17	(1)
2019–2020	Wrexham	35	(3)
2020–2023	A.F.C. Telford United	62	(18)
2023–2025	Newtown	55	(14)
2025–2026	Connah's Quay Nomads	16	(2)
Total		353+	(120+)
- * Club domestic league appearances and goals as of 16:46, 20 July 2026 (UTC)

Jason Oswell (born 7 October 1992) is an English former footballer who played as a striker.

Following successful loan spells with Market Drayton Town and Nantwich Town, he turned professional at Crewe Alexandra in summer 2011. He spent the first half of the 2011–12 season on loan at Rhyl, before he was allowed to move on to Inverness Caledonian Thistle in June 2012. He failed to establish himself in the first-team and left the club in January 2013, ending the 2012–13 season at non-league sides Nantwich Town and Witton Albion. He spent four months in Australia with APIA Leichhardt Tigers from May 2013, where he won the Waratah Cup. He then returned to Wales and signed with Rhyl, though ended the 2013–14 season with Welsh Premier League runners-up Airbus UK Broughton. He joined Newtown in June 2014, and went on to enjoy a highly successful three seasons with the club, being named as Welsh Premier League Player of the Season in 2016–17 after scoring 22 goals in 31 league games. He also played on the losing side in the 2015 Welsh Cup final and was twice named in the Welsh Premier League Team of the Year. He signed with Stockport County in June 2017 and was named as the club's Player of the Season in 2017–18 after scoring 28 goals from 47 appearances. He returned to League football with Morecambe in June 2018.

== Playing career ==
=== Crewe Alexandra ===
Born in Northwich, Oswell began his career at Crewe Alexandra. Alongside club-mate Ollie Turton, he joined Northern Premier League Division One South side Market Drayton Town on loan in February 2011, making his competitive debut in a 3–0 victory over Spalding United on 5 February. Having scored six goals for the "Gingerbread Men", he went on to end the 2010–11 season on loan in the Northern Premier League Premier Division with Nantwich Town, scoring three goals in eight appearances for the "Dabbers".

Oswell was handed a one-year professional contract at Gresty Road and sent out on loan to Welsh club Rhyl for the first half of the 2011–12 season. After a strong start during his spell at Belle Vue, scoring six goals in his first ten appearances, he was named as Cymru Alliance player of the month for October. He went on to score a total of 19 goals in 20 appearances for the "Lilywhites".

=== Inverness to Broughton ===
On 28 June 2012, Oswell joined Scottish Premier League side Inverness Caledonian Thistle, who were managed by former England international Terry Butcher. He made his "Caley Thistle" debut on 11 August, in a 1–1 draw with Kilmarnock at the Caledonian Stadium. He featured in just one further game before leaving the club by mutual consent in January 2013. He re-signed for former club Nantwich Town in February 2013, before moving to Witton Albion in March 2013. He helped Albion to qualify for the play-offs, though left Wincham Park before their play-off semi-final tie with F.C. United of Manchester.

Oswell signed for Australian National Premier Leagues NSW club APIA Leichhardt Tigers in May 2013, making his debut later that month against the Rockdale City Suns. He helped the Tigers to win the 2013 edition of the Waratah Cup, scoring a hat-trick against the Central Coast Mariners Academy in the quarter-finals, and then the opening goal in the 3–0 victory over Sutherland Sharks in the grand final at Seymour Shaw Park. He returned to Wales in September 2013 after rejoining Rhyl, who now were playing in the Welsh Premier League. He scored three goals in 15 appearances for Rhyl, before ending the 2013–14 campaign by playing six games for eventual runners-up Airbus UK Broughton.

=== Newtown ===
Oswell signed with Newtown in June 2014. He finished as the club's top scorer in the 2014–15 season after scoring 20 goals in 37 appearances, and was named on the Welsh Premier League Team of the Year. The "Robins" finished sixth in the league, but made it to the next season's UEFA Europa League qualification stage after beating Aberystwyth Town 2–1 in the Europa League play-off final at Park Avenue. They also reached the final of the Welsh Cup, but were beaten 2–0 by The New Saints. He scored 13 goals in 34 games across the 2015–16 campaign, including a hat-trick in a 3–2 win over Connah's Quay Nomads on 16 April. His tally also included two goals against Maltese side Valletta in what was the club's first ever victory in the Europa League. However Newtown failed to qualify for Europe for the next season after losing 2–1 to Airbus UK Broughton in the play-off semi-finals at Latham Park. He scored 25 goals in 37 appearances during the 2016–17 season, earning himself the Welsh Premier League golden boot and a place on the Welsh Premier League Team of the Year, as well as the overall Welsh Premier League Player of the Season award. However Newtown could only manage a seventh-place finish, and were beaten 3–2 by Bangor City in the Europa League play-off semi-final at Nantporth. Oswell scored three hat-tricks during the season, against Rhyl, Aberystwyth Town and Airbus UK Broughton.

=== Stockport County ===
Oswell signed for Stockport County in June 2017. Manager Jim Gannon said he thought goalscoring centre-forwards were hard to find in non-league football so had instead looked at the Welsh league in order to find a front-man to lead the "Hatters". It proved to be an astute signing, as Oswell scored 28 goals in 47 games, including hat-tricks against Leamington, North Ferriby United and Spennymoor Town. County qualified for the National League North play-offs with a fifth-place finish, but were beaten 1–0 by Chorley at Edgeley Park at the semi-final stage. Oswell was named as the club's Player of the Season.

=== Morecambe ===
He returned to League football with Morecambe in June 2018.

=== Wrexham ===
In January 2019 he was bought by Wrexham for an undisclosed fee, signing an 18-month contract.

=== Telford ===
In July 2020, Oswell signed for A.F.C. Telford United.

=== Return to Newtown ===
On 31 May 2023 he re-signed for Newtown.

=== Connnah's Quay Nomads ===
In May 2025 he joined Connah's Quay Nomads.

=== Retirement ===
On 19 July 2026, Oswell announced his retirement from football.

== Style of play ==
Oswell is a striker with good aerial ability and hold-up play.

== Personal life ==
Whilst playing semi-professionally, Oswell worked as a physiotherapy assistant within the National Health Service and studied physiotherapy at university. As part of his final placement for university, Oswell travelled to Uganda with a charity group to help children with neurological conditions. He graduated from the University of Salford in July 2017.

== Career statistics ==
As of match played 7 March 2020.

Appearances and goals by club, season and competition
Club	Season	League			National Cup		League Cup		Other		Total	
Club	Season	Division	Apps	Goals	Apps	Goals	Apps	Goals	Apps	Goals	Apps	Goals
Crewe Alexandra	2011–12	League Two	0	0	0	0	0	0	—		0	0
Inverness Caledonian Thistle	2012–13	Scottish Premier League	2	0	0	0	0	0	—		2	0
Rhyl	2013–14	Welsh Premier League	14	3	0	0	1	0	—		15	3
Airbus UK Broughton	2013–14	Welsh Premier League	5	0	1	0	0	0	—		6	0
Newtown	2014–15	Welsh Premier League	34	18	3	2	0	0	—		37	20
Newtown	2015–16	Welsh Premier League	29	10	1	1	0	0	4 (Note: Appearances in UEFA Europa League)	2	34	13
Newtown	2016–17	Welsh Premier League	31	22	0	0	2	1	—		33	23
Newtown	Total		94	50	4	3	2	1	4	2	104	56
Stockport County	2017–18	National League North	40	25	0	0	—		7 (Note: Appearances in FA Trophy)	3	47	28
Morecambe	2018–19	League Two	17	1	2	0	1	0	3	1	23	2
Wrexham	2018–19	National League	14	1	0	0	0	0	2	0	16	1
Wrexham	2019–20	National League	20	2	0	0	0	0	2	0	22	2
Wrexham	Total		34	3	0	0	0	0	4	0	38	3
Career total			206	82	7	3	4	1	18	6	235	92

== Honours ==
APIA Leichhardt Tigers

- Waratah Cup winner: 2013

Airbus UK Broughton

- Welsh Premier League runner-up: 2013–14

Newtown

- Welsh Cup runner-up: 2015

Individual

- Welsh Premier League Player of the Season: 2016–17
- Welsh Premier League Team of the Year: 2014–15, 2016–17
- Stockport County F.C. Player of the Season: 2017–18
