= Zak Mills =

English footballer

Personal information
- Full name: Zachary Louvaine Mills
- Date of birth: 28 May 1992 (age 34)
- Place of birth: Peterborough, England
- Height: 1.83 m (6 ft 0 in)
- Position: Right-back

Team information
- Current team: King's Lynn Town

Youth career
- Boston United

Senior career*
Years	Team	Apps	(Gls)
2010–2014	Histon	116	(4)
2014–2016	Boston United	71	(6)
2016–2018	Grimsby Town	58	(0)
2018–2019	Morecambe	38	(1)
2019–2020	Oldham Athletic	25	(1)
2020–2021	Port Vale	21	(0)
2021–2022	Walsall	9	(0)
2022–2026	Boston United	107	(9)
2026–	King's Lynn Town	0	(0)
- * Club domestic league appearances and goals as of 21:48, 29 April 2026 (UTC)

Zachary Louvaine Mills (born 28 May 1992) is an English professional footballer who plays as a right-back for National League North club King's Lynn Town.

Mills began his career at Histon, establishing himself in the first team as they were relegated out of the Conference Premier at the end of the 2010–11 season. He played 124 games for the club before moving on to Boston United in March 2014. He spent just over two seasons with Boston before moving up to the English Football League with Grimsby Town in June 2016. He spent two seasons with Grimsby and then moved on to Morecambe in June 2018. He won the club's Player of the Year award at the end of the 2018–19 campaign and switched to Oldham Athletic in June 2019. He was released after one season with Oldham and moved on to Port Vale in July 2020. He was released from Port Vale at the end of the 2020–21 season and subsequently signed with Walsall. Released at the end of the 2021–22 season, he rejoined Boston United in August 2022. He won promotion from the National League North with Boston via the play-offs in 2024 and was named as the club's Player of the Year for the 2024–25 season. He joined King's Lynn Town in June 2026.

== Career ==
=== Histon ===
Born in Peterborough, Mills played youth football with Boston United, and began his senior career at Histon. He made his debut for the club on 14 August 2010, in a 3–1 win over Barrow at Bridge Road; assistant manager Dean Greygoose said that "It was an unbelievable win, especially given we went a goal down and our young players showed a lot of bottle". He went on to feature 40 times in the 2010–11 season, which ended in relegation out of the Conference Premier for Histon. He scored his first career goal on 29 August 2011, in a 2–0 win at Solihull Moors. The "Stutes" went on to finish the 2011–12 season in 16th-place in the Conference North, with Mills playing 31 games. He made 39 appearances in the 2012–13 campaign as Histon finished above the relegation after finishing above 20th-placed Corby Town due to a superior goal difference of just one goal. He scored three goals in 14 matches in the 2013–14 season, which ended in relegation for the club after his departure.

=== Boston United ===
He signed with Boston United in March 2014; the move was familiar to the player as manager Dennis Greene had previously been in charge in Histon, whilst Mills had previously spent time at Boston's Centre of Excellence. He scored one goal in six games towards the end of the 2013–14 season, which saw Boston miss out on the Conference North play-offs by six points. He established himself in the first team during the 2014–15 campaign, featuring in 44 games as the "Pilgrims" posted a third-place finish. Boston were eliminated from the play-off semi-finals by Chorley, losing a penalty shoot-out at York Street following a 2–2 draw; Mills converted his penalty, whilst Rene Steer missed the crucial spot-kick as the shoot-out went to sudden death. Boston again qualified for the play-offs at the end of the 2015–16 season, and Mills scored the second goal of a 2–0 home win over North Ferriby United in the first leg of the play-off semi-finals, though North Ferriby won the return fixture 3–0 to eliminate Boston from the play-offs.

=== Grimsby Town ===
On 15 June 2016, Mills stepped up two divisions into the English Football League to join League Two club Grimsby Town on a two-year deal. He faced a difficult task in dislodging the experienced Ben Davies at right-back. He made his debut for the "Mariners" in the EFL Trophy on 30 August, after suffering a hamstring injury in pre-season. He played 34 games in the 2016–17 season, which Grimsby ended in 14th-place after going through three managers in Paul Hurst, Marcus Bignot and Russell Slade. He was linked to a move to Shrewsbury Town in May 2017, managed by Paul Hurst, who signed him at Grimsby.

He was sent off for the first time in his career on the opening day of the 2017–18 season, in a 3–1 defeat at Chesterfield on 5 August, having received a second yellow card in the game following a clash with Kristian Dennis. The next month he was sidelined for five league games after picking up a hamstring injury. During that time, Davies performed well in his absence. He next started a league game in November, after Davies moved to left-back to cover for the suspended Paul Dixon. He was released by Grimsby after playing 32 games in the 2017–18 season. The Grimsby Telegraph reported that his name was one of the biggest surprises on Michael Jolley's 11 strong released list, as Davies was also let go to leave Reece Hall-Johnson as the only right-back remaining at Blundell Park.

=== Morecambe ===
On 21 June 2018, Mills signed a one-year contract with Morecambe. Manager Jim Bentley said that "we see him as a player who can get even better". He scored his first goal in the EFL on 6 April, securing an important point in a 1–1 draw with relegation rivals Macclesfield Town. At the end of the 2018–19 season, Mills won three awards at the end of the season awards at the Globe Arena, including Player of the Year.

=== Oldham Athletic ===
On 21 June 2019, after turning down a new contract at Morecambe, Mills signed a one-year contract with Oldham Athletic. On 21 September, he provided two assists in a 3–1 win over former club Morecambe at Boundary Park, in what was Dino Maamria's first game in charge following the sacking of Laurent Banide. The "Latics" finished the 2019–20 season in 19th-place and Mills was released in July 2020.

=== Port Vale ===
On 16 July 2020, he signed a one-year contract with Port Vale. Assistant manager Dave Kevan said that he was brought in to provide competition for James Gibbons. Manager John Askey had reportedly tried to sign him the previous year, but lost out to Oldham. He scored on his debut for the club, a volleyed goal in an 2–1 win at Scunthorpe United in an EFL Cup game on 5 September. However, he was ruled out of action for four weeks after picking up a grade two tear in his hamstring in a 0–0 draw with Harrogate Town on 26 September; the game had seen Mills help the "Valiants" to keep their third consecutive clean sheet in the league. He then had to isolate after testing positive for COVID-19, leaving him unable to play again until the start of December. On 31 March, he was deregistered from the squad to make space for Harry McKirdy, after Mills picked up an injury which would keep him out of action for the rest of the 2020–21 season. On 10 May 2021 it was announced that he would leave Port Vale when his contract expired at the end of the season.

=== Walsall ===
He signed a one-year contract with Walsall on 8 July 2021, after which manager Matthew Taylor praised his character and versatility. Mills featured 14 times for the club, including just twice after Michael Flynn took charge in February. Mills left the Bescot Stadium after being released at the end of the 2021–22 season.

=== Return to Boston United ===
On 5 August 2022, Mills returned to Boston United in the National League North, with manager Paul Cox saying "it was a no-brainer to bring him in". He made 26 league appearances in the 2022–23 campaign, scoring two goals. He played 29 league games in the 2023–24 season. Boston secured promotion through the play-offs after beating Brackley Town 2–1 in the final. He signed a new contract in June 2024. He scored six goals in 44 appearances across the 2024–25 campaign, and won the club's Player of the Year award. Speaking in October 2025, manager Graham Coughlan said that Mills was a key influence on the team, praising "the importance of him as a person, as a leader, a character and as a player". He played 15 games in the 2025–26 campaign, missing from November onwards with a long-term hamstring injury, and was released upon the season's conclusion.

=== King's Lynn Town ===
On 2 June 2026, Mills joined National League North club King's Lynn Town, where manager Paul Caddis was looking to build a more experienced team. He was named on the National League North Team of the Week for the weekend of 12 September 2026 for his performance against Chorley.

== Style of play ==
Mills plays primarily as a right-back but can also play elsewhere in defence or midfield. He has good athleticism, allowing him to join the play going forward from the full-back role. He describes himself as "an all rounder".

== Career statistics ==
As of match played 25 April 2026

Appearances and goals by club, season and competition
Club	Season	League			FA Cup		EFL Cup		Other		Total	
Club	Season	Division	Apps	Goals	Apps	Goals	Apps	Goals	Apps	Goals	Apps	Goals
Histon	2010–11	Conference Premier	39	0 (Note: Soccerway incorrectly attributes Danny Mills goal against Altrincham to Zak Mills.)	1	0	—		—		40	0
Histon	2011–12	Conference North	28	1	0	0	—		3	0	31	1
Histon	2012–13	Conference North	35	0	0	0	—		4	0	39	0
Histon	2013–14	Conference North	14	3	0	0	—		—		14	3
Histon	Total		116	4	1	0	—		7	0	124	4
Boston United	2013–14	Conference North	6	1	0	0	—		—		6	1
Boston United	2014–15	Conference North	36	3	2	1	—		6 (Note: 3 appearances in the FA Trophy, 2 appearances in the play-offs and 1 appearance in the Lincolnshire Senior Cup.)	0	44	4
Boston United	2015–16	National League North	29	2	1	0	—		4 (Note: 2 appearances and 1 goal in the play-offs, 1 appearance in the FA Trophy and 1 appearance in the Lincolnshire Senior Cup.)	1	34	3
Boston United	Total		71	6	3	1	—		10	1	84	8
Grimsby Town	2016–17	League Two	30	0	1	0	0	0	3 (Note: Appearance(s) in the EFL Trophy.)	0	34	0
Grimsby Town	2017–18	League Two	28	0	0	0	1	0	3	0	32	0
Grimsby Town	Total		58	0	1	0	1	0	6	0	66	0
Morecambe	2018–19	League Two	38	1	2	0	0	0	0	0	40	1
Oldham Athletic	2019–20	League Two	25	1	2	0	1	0	1	0	29	1
Port Vale	2020–21	League Two	21	0	0	0	2	1	2	1	25	2
Walsall	2021–22	League Two	9	0	1	0	1	0	3	0	14	0
Boston United	2022–23	National League North	26	2	3	0	—		1 (Note: Appearance(s) in the Lincolnshire Senior Cup.)	0	30	2
Boston United	2023–24	National League North	29	0	0	0	—		4 (Note: 1 appearance in the Lincolnshire Senior Cup and 3 appearances in the play-offs)	0	33	0
Boston United	2024–25	National League	39	6	2	0	—		3 (Note: 1 appearance in the FA Trophy and 2 appearances in the National League Cup)	0	44	6
Boston United	2025–26	National League	13	1	0	0	—		2 (Note: Appearance(s) in the National League Cup.)	0	15	1
Boston United	Total		107	9	5	0	0	0	10	0	122	9
King's Lynn Town	2026–27	National League North	0	0	0	0	—		0	0	0	0
Career total			445	21	15	1	5	1	39	2	504	25

== Honours ==
Boston United

- National League North play-offs: 2024

Individual

- Morecambe Player of the Year: 2018–19
- Boston United Player of the Year: 2024–25
