= Nicolas Mirza =

French footballer (born 1984)

Personal information
- Full name: Nicolas Hugues Mirza
- Date of birth: 18 November 1984 (age 41)
- Place of birth: Épinay-sur-Seine, France
- Height: 1.87 m (6 ft 2 in)
- Position: Midfielder

Youth career
- Red Star
- 2002–2004: Paris Saint-Germain

Senior career*
Years	Team	Apps	(Gls)
2003–2004	Paris Saint-Germain	0	(0)
2004–2005	Yeovil Town	3	(0)
2004	→ Forest Green Rovers (loan)	0	(0)
2005	→ Weymouth (loan)	?	(?)
2005–2009	Pacy Vallée-d'Eure	?	(?)
2009–2012	Paris FC	68	(4)
2012–2013	US Quevilly	27	(1)
2014–2015	UJA Maccabi Paris Métropole	10	(2)

International career
2012	Martinique	3	(0)
- * Club domestic league appearances and goals

Nicolas Hugues Mirza (born 18 November 1984) is a French former professional footballer who played as a midfielder.

== Career ==
Mirza played a number of games in the European Youth Cup for Paris Saint-Germain.

He went on to sign a two-year contract for Yeovil Town from Paris Saint-Germain following his release on a free transfer on 22 July 2004. Yeovil manager, Gary Johnson commented on the new signing saying; "Nicolas is a good athlete and a good footballer and he's got that French bit of class about him". He made his debut for Yeovil Town against Bury in the 3–1 away defeat in the League Two match, replacing Lee Johnson as a substitute in the 80th minute. Mirza made two more appearances for Yeovil in League Two and one in the Football League Trophy. In October, he signed on loan for Conference National club Forest Green Rovers. He was sent out on loan to Conference South side Weymouth in January 2005, where Yeovil manager Gary Johnson's brother, Steve was manager. Steve Johnson cancelled Mirza and Kezie Ibe's loan spell early in March stating; "They still had two weeks of their current loan spells left but I have sent them back because, although they are both good players, they weren't doing enough for me". On his return to Yeovil, he was transfer listed.

Mirza moved Pacy Vallée-d'Eure, before joining Paris FC in 2009.
