= Reece Deakin =

Welsh footballer

Personal information
- Date of birth: 12 December 1996 (age 29)
- Height: 1.91 m (6 ft 3 in)
- Position: Forward

Youth career
- Crystal Palace

Senior career*
Years	Team	Apps	(Gls)
2015–2016	Cray Wanderers		
2016–2017	Conwy Borough		
2017	Airbus UK Broughton	8	(1)
2017–2018	Morecambe	0	(0)
- * Club domestic league appearances and goals as of 08:52, 10 May 2018 (UTC)

Reece Deakin (born 12 December 1996) is a Welsh professional footballer who plays as a forward.

== Career ==
Deakin played youth football for Crystal Palace and spent time with Cray Wanderers, before signing for Conwy Borough in October 2016. He moved to Airbus UK Broughton in January 2017, before turning professional with Morecambe in July 2017. He was released by Morecambe at the end of the 2017–18 season, having made three cup appearances for them.

== Career statistics ==
As of 10 May 2018

Appearances and goals by club, season and competition
Club	Season	League			National Cup		League Cup		Other		Total	
Club	Season	Division	Apps	Goals	Apps	Goals	Apps	Goals	Apps	Goals	Apps	Goals
Airbus UK Broughton	2016–17	Welsh Premier League	8	1	0	0	0	0	0	0	8	1
Morecambe	2017–18	League Two	0	0	0	0	1	0	2	0	3	0
Career total			8	1	0	0	1	0	2	0	11	1
