= Michael Rose (footballer, born 1982) =

English footballer

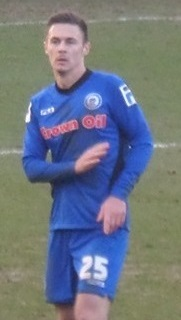
- Rose playing for Rochdale in 2015

Personal information
- Full name: Michael Charles Rose
- Date of birth: 28 July 1982 (age 44)
- Place of birth: Salford, England
- Height: 5 ft 10 in (1.78 m)
- Positions: Defender; midfielder

Youth career
- 1998–2001: Manchester United

Senior career*
| Years | Team | Apps | (Gls) |
| 2001–2002 | Chester City | 35 | (4) |
| 2002–2004 | Hereford United | 83 | (6) |
| 2004–2006 | Yeovil Town | 41 | (1) |
| 2005 | → Cheltenham Town (loan) | 3 | (0) |
| 2006 | → Scunthorpe United (loan) | 15 | (0) |
| 2006–2010 | Stockport County | 107 | (8) |
| 2010 | → Norwich City (loan) | 12 | (1) |
| 2010–2011 | Swindon Town | 35 | (3) |
| 2011–2013 | Colchester United | 36 | (2) |
| 2013–2016 | Rochdale | 118 | (8) |
| 2016–2018 | Morecambe | 85 | (9) |
| 2018–2020 | Macclesfield Town | 41 | (5) |
| 2020 | Warrington Town | | |

International career^{‡}
| 2002–2003 | England C | 5 | (0) |
- * Club domestic league appearances and goals as of 18:05, 23 May 2021 (UTC) ‡ National team caps and goals as of 17:00, 24 May 2003 (UTC)

Michael Charles Rose (born 28 July 1982) is an English professional footballer who last played for Warrington Town. A defender, he has made 454 appearances in the Football League, including 107 for Stockport County.

Rose came up through the Manchester United Academy before moving to Chester City in 2001. Further spells followed at Hereford United, Yeovil Town, Cheltenham Town (loan) and Scunthorpe United (loan), before Rose joined Stockport County in time for the 2006–07 campaign. He went on to play 107 games for Stockport and helped them to promotion at Rochdale's expense in the 2008 League Two play-off final, but spent the final six months of his time at Stockport on loan at Norwich City. Rose moved south to join Swindon Town in August 2010, but following their relegation from League One nine months later, he joined Colchester United. Rose joined Rochdale on an initial short-term contract in February 2013, after being released by Colchester. After being released in the summer of 2016 by Rochdale, Rose signed for Morecambe on a one-year contract.

He has represented England at semi-professional level.

== Club career ==
=== Manchester United ===
Born in Salford, Greater Manchester, Rose progressed through the youth ranks at Manchester United and he signed a trainee contract on 6 July 1998. On 12 September, he scored against Derby playing for United's under-17 side as they won 4–0 in the FA Premier Academy League. His first involvement with the reserves side came in December when he was an unused substitute against Sunderland. Rose featured in the NIVEA Junior Football Tournament in April 1999 as United finished as runners-up. Throughout the season, he helped the under-17s achieve a 21-game unbeaten run in the league as they finished top of their group to qualify for the play-offs. He scored in the play-off games against Leicester and Sunderland before United lost to Blackburn Rovers in the semi-final.

The following season, Rose began to play for United's under-19 side. He featured in multiple friendlies in pre-season before making his first competitive appearance in the 2–0 league defeat versus Sunderland at the beginning of September. On 2 December, he played the full 90-minutes as United got knocked out of the FA Youth Cup following a 2–1 defeat against Nottingham Forest at Gigg Lane. Rose scored his first goals of the season in March 2000 when he got a brace in the league win against Birmingham City. He played 20 league games and scored two goals that ultimately helped United to a third place finish in their group and earned them a spot in the play-offs. During the play-offs, Rose played in the 6–1 win against Leeds United but didn't feature as United were knocked out in next round against West Ham. On 5 April, Rose started for the reserves in the Manchester Senior Cup as they lost versus Oldham Athletic at The Cliff. Post season he was part of the squad that took part in the International Youth Tournament hosted by Real Sociedad. He played in all three group games against Sevilla, Osasuna, and Real Sociedad, managing to score a goal in the draw against Osasuna, but United failed to qualify for the final.

On 1 August, Rose signed on as a professional at the club. A few days later, he played in the Bayern Munich Centenary Youth Tournament as United finished in third place. He continue to play for the under-19s' team as the new season got underway but as the season progressed he'd get more game time for the reserves. His first goal of the season came on 28 October when he opened the scoring in the under-19s league match against local rivals Manchester City. He featured 12 times throughout the season as United finished fifth in their group meaning they missed out on the play-offs. On 23 April 2001, Rose played for the reserves as they won their final group game against Oldham in the Manchester Senior Cup. Three days later, he made his last appearance for United in the 2–1 reserve league win versus Manchester City. On 30 June, he was released from the club without making a first-team appearance.

=== Chester City ===
Rose joined Football Conference side Chester City after his release, he signed on the same day as his brother, Stephen. On 18 August, Rose made his debut for Chester in the opening game of the season; he played the full 90-minutes as Chester lost 2–0 against Woking at the Deva Stadium. Three days later, he was sent off in the 3–2 defeat at Southport. He scored his first goal for the club on 13 October when he opened the scoring with a superb free-kick as City ran out 3–0 winners versus Morecambe. On 9 February 2002, Rose received his second red card of the season when he was sent off in the 0–0 draw against Margate at Hartsdown Park. He was subsequently banned for two games. On his return to the side Rose scored two free-kicks as Chester won 3–1 at Nuneaton Borough. Overall he made 35 league appearances and scored four goals for Chester as they finished 14th in the league table. Rose was released by the club at the end of the season.

=== Hereford United ===
On 4 July 2002, Rose joined fellow Conference club Hereford United on a free transfer. He made his debut on the opening day of the season as he helped Hereford kick off their league campaign with a win against Farnborough Town. His first goal for the club came in the 2–0 win at Stevenage Borough on 21 September; he floated a 30-yard free-kick into the top corner to double United's lead on 31 minutes. Rose played in the defeats to Second Division sides Northampton Town and Wigan Athletic as Hereford fell at the first hurdle in both the Football League Trophy and the FA Cup, respectively. On 14 December, he scored two goals as United thrashed Woking 5–0 in the league game at Edgar Street. He scored his fourth goal of the season, a 30-yard strike to open the scoring, in the win versus Margate in February 2003. In March, he signed a one-year contract extension with the club. Rose would only miss one league game throughout the season as Hereford finished sixth in the league just one place outside of the play-offs. His performances earned him call-up to the England National Game XI squad for the Four Nations tournament and also a spot in the Conference team of the year as voted for by the league's managers.

At the start of the 2003–04 season, Rose scored two goals as Hereford went eight matches unbeaten to establish a three-point lead at the top of the Conference league table. On 8 November, he played the whole game as United were knocked out of the FA Cup in the first round against Second Division club Peterborough United. He was sent off for two bookable offences in the 2–2 draw with Morecambe in January 2004. On 27 February, Rose played in the 9–0 win versus Dagenham & Redbridge which was broadcast live on Sky Sports. The result equalled the record for the biggest win in the Conference. He received his tenth yellow card of the season in the win against Shrewsbury Town at the end of March, and was subsequently suspended for two matches. He played in the final league game of the season as Hereford beat Chester 2–1 to secure a second place finish in the league, meaning they qualified for the play-offs. On 29 April, Rose played the full 90-minutes as United drew 1–1 with Aldershot Town in the play-off semi-final first leg at the Recreation Ground. Four days later in the second leg, he played the whole game again as the match finished 0–0 after extra time and Hereford lost 4–2 on penalties to be eliminated. This would be his last game for the club.

=== Yeovil Town ===
Rose signed for League Two club Yeovil Town on 7 May 2004. He signed a two-year deal with the club with Hereford receiving a compensatory fee for his services. He made his debut as Yeovil lost 3–1 at Bury on 7 August. He made his first career appearance in the Football League Cup as Town beat Championship side Plymouth Argyle in the first round. He would feature again in the second round as Yeovil were eliminated by Premier League club Bolton Wanderers on 21 September. Rose had to wait until April 2005 to get his first goal for the club when he scored a free-kick in the 5–2 win versus Mansfield Town at Huish Park. On 7 May, he played in final game of the season as Yeovil beat Lincoln to clinch the League Two title and gain promotion to League One. He was named in the League Two PFA Team of the Year for his efforts throughout the season. Rose would conclude his season with more silverware when he was part of the Yeovil side that beat Odd Down to win the Somerset Premier Cup on 11 May.

Rose didn't feature in the first team at the start of the 2005–06 season so, at the end of August, he was allowed to join Cheltenham Town on a month's loan to get some competitive football under his belt. He was not offered a new contract with Yeovil following the expiration of his deal and was subsequently released.

=== Cheltenham Town (loan) ===
"I was disappointed not to be playing. I went on loan to get games and I didn't play at Wrexham, which was very disappointing. I was disappointed more to miss a second game in a row. I'm travelling up to Cheltenham from Yeovil to train every day and obviously I want to be playing. I've really enjoyed my time at Cheltenham. John Ward is great, the set-up is great, and the lads are brilliant."

— Rose commenting on his time on loan at Cheltenham in September 2005.

Rose made his debut for Cheltenham on 27 August; he played 58 minutes of the 1–1 draw with Leyton Orient before being replaced by Brian Wilson at Whaddon Road. He played twice more over the next six days but wouldn't appear again for The Robins before his loan deal was cut short and he returned to Yeovil. Rose would later comment that he was disappointed to not be playing considering he was travelling from Yeovil each day to train.

=== Scunthorpe United (loan) ===
Scunthorpe United took Rose on loan on 2 January 2006 for an initial month-long loan deal. Having impressed Scunthorpe manager Brian Laws, Rose's loan was extended until the end of the season, making a total of 15 appearances.

=== Stockport County ===
On 15 June 2006, Rose signed a two-year contract with Stockport County. After missing the first few months of the 2007–08 season through injury, Rose penned an extension with the club for a further year in summer 2008, with the option of a further year. However, he was set to leave the club in the summer of 2009 after falling out with manager Jim Gannon, and had agreed to join Hartlepool United, but with Stockport in administration and a takeover looming, Gannon was made redundant and Rose decided to stay. In January 2010, Norwich City signed Rose on loan until the end of the season as a replacement to the injured Adam Drury who had torn a thigh muscle. He went straight into the Canaries squad in a game against Hartlepool. He scored on his debut with the game finishing 2–1 to Norwich and keeping the club at the top of the League One table.

=== Swindon Town ===
Having helped Norwich win promotion to the Championship, Rose signed for League One side Swindon Town on 30 June 2010 on a free transfer from Stockport on a two-year deal. Rose started the first five games of the season for the club, but was then dropped for Callum Kennedy and then Alan Sheehan, coming on for the latter and scoring an equaliser in a game against Plymouth Argyle, eventually losing the game 3–2.

=== Colchester United ===
In May 2011, Rose joined Colchester United on a two-year deal after Swindon were relegated and his contract there was terminated. He started Colchester's opening five games following his switch, but he was dropped by manager John Ward following some poor performances and had to wait nearly four months for his next start, making Colchester's starting line-up only seven further times in the 2011–12 season. He began the 2012–13 season as a regular starter. He scored his first goal for the club on 21 August 2012 in a 2–2 draw with Portsmouth, equalising on the stroke of half-time with a left-footed strike from more than 30 yards. This goal would later win him the 'Goal of the Year' award at the end of season awards at the club. On 31 January 2013, his contract with Colchester was cancelled by mutual consent.

=== Rochdale ===
On 14 February 2013, Rose joined Rochdale in League Two having been a free agent since his release by Colchester United. On 15 May 2013, he agreed a new deal that would keep him at Spotland for two further seasons. On 1 July 2014, Rose agreed a one-year extension to his current deal, committing himself to the summer of 2016.

=== Morecambe ===
Rose joined Morecambe at the start of the 2016–17 season, but was released after two years at the end of the 2017–18 season.

=== Macclesfield Town ===
In July 2018, Rose joined Macclesfield Town, taking the squad number 24.

=== Warrington Town ===
In September 2020, he joined Warrington Town.

== International career ==
Rose has been capped five times for the England National Game XI, which represents England at semi-professional level, making his debut in a 3–2 defeat to Italy. In May 2003, he played every game as England won the Four Nations tournament hosted in Wales.

== Career statistics ==
As of match played 1 February 2020

Appearances and goals by club, season and competition
| Club | Season | League | | | FA Cup | | League Cup | | Other | | Total | |
| Club | Season | Division | Apps | Goals | Apps | Goals | Apps | Goals | Apps | Goals | Apps | Goals |
|---|---|---|---|---|---|---|---|---|---|---|---|---|
| Chester City | 2001–02 | Conference Premier | 35 | 4 | 1 | 0 | — | | 2 (Note: One appearance in the FA Trophy and one in the Conference League Cup) | 0 | 38 | 4 |
| Hereford United | 2002–03 | Conference Premier | 41 | 4 | 2 | 0 | — | | 1 (Note: Appearances in the Football League Trophy) | 0 | 44 | 4 |
| Hereford United | 2003–04 | Conference Premier | 42 | 2 | 2 | 0 | — | | 1 | 0 | 45 | 2 |
| Hereford United | Total | | 83 | 6 | 4 | 0 | — | | 2 | 0 | 89 | 6 |
| Yeovil Town | 2004–05 | League Two | 40 | 1 | 4 | 0 | 2 | 0 | 1 | 0 | 47 | 1 |
| Yeovil Town | 2005–06 | League One | 1 | 0 | 0 | 0 | 0 | 0 | 0 | 0 | 1 | 0 |
| Yeovil Town | Total | | 41 | 1 | 4 | 0 | 2 | 0 | 1 | 0 | 48 | 1 |
| Cheltenham Town (loan) | 2005–06 | League Two | 3 | 0 | 0 | 0 | 0 | 0 | 0 | 0 | 3 | 0 |
| Scunthorpe United (loan) | 2005–06 | League One | 15 | 0 | 1 | 0 | 0 | 0 | 0 | 0 | 16 | 0 |
| Stockport County | 2006–07 | League Two | 25 | 3 | 2 | 0 | 1 | 0 | 2 | 0 | 30 | 3 |
| Stockport County | 2007–08 | League Two | 31 | 3 | 2 | 0 | 0 | 0 | 2 | 0 | 35 | 3 |
| Stockport County | 2008–09 | League One | 26 | 0 | 1 | 1 | 0 | 0 | 2 | 0 | 29 | 1 |
| Stockport County | 2009–10 | League One | 24 | 2 | 1 | 0 | 1 | 0 | 2 | 0 | 28 | 2 |
| Stockport County | Total | | 107 | 8 | 6 | 1 | 2 | 0 | 8 | 0 | 123 | 9 |
| Norwich City (loan) | 2009–10 | League One | 12 | 1 | 0 | 0 | 0 | 0 | 0 | 0 | 12 | 1 |
| Swindon Town | 2010–11 | League One | 35 | 3 | 3 | 0 | 1 | 0 | 2 | 0 | 41 | 3 |
| Colchester United | 2011–12 | League One | 14 | 0 | 0 | 0 | 1 | 0 | 1 | 0 | 16 | 0 |
| Colchester United | 2012–13 | League One | 22 | 2 | 1 | 1 | 1 | 0 | 0 | 0 | 24 | 3 |
| Colchester United | Total | | 36 | 2 | 1 | 1 | 2 | 0 | 1 | 0 | 40 | 3 |
| Rochdale | 2012–13 | League Two | 14 | 2 | 0 | 0 | 0 | 0 | 0 | 0 | 14 | 2 |
| Rochdale | 2013–14 | League Two | 42 | 4 | 3 | 1 | 0 | 0 | 2 | 0 | 47 | 5 |
| Rochdale | 2014–15 | League One | 32 | 1 | 4 | 0 | 1 | 0 | 0 | 0 | 37 | 1 |
| Rochdale | 2015–16 | League One | 30 | 1 | 2 | 0 | 1 | 0 | 1 | 0 | 34 | 1 |
| Rochdale | Total | | 118 | 8 | 9 | 1 | 2 | 0 | 3 | 0 | 132 | 9 |
| Morecambe | 2016–17 | League Two | 43 | 7 | 2 | 0 | 2 | 0 | 3 | 0 | 50 | 7 |
| Morecambe | 2017–18 | League Two | 42 | 2 | 1 | 0 | 1 | 1 | 2 | 0 | 46 | 3 |
| Morecambe | Total | | 85 | 9 | 3 | 0 | 3 | 1 | 5 | 0 | 96 | 10 |
| Macclesfield Town | 2018–19 | League Two | 40 | 5 | 1 | 0 | 1 | 0 | 3 | 2 | 45 | 7 |
| Macclesfield Town | 2019–20 | League Two | 1 | 0 | 0 | 0 | 0 | 0 | 3 | 0 | 4 | 0 |
| Macclesfield Town | Total | | 41 | 5 | 1 | 0 | 1 | 0 | 6 | 2 | 49 | 7 |
| Career totals | | | 610 | 47 | 33 | 3 | 13 | 1 | 30 | 2 | 686 | 53 |

== Honours ==
Yeovil Town

- Football League Two: 2004–05
- Somerset Premier Cup: 2004–05

Stockport County

- Football League Two play-offs: 2008

England C

- Four Nations: 2003

Individual

- Football Conference Team of the Year: 2002–03
- PFA Team of the Year: 2004–05 League Two, 2013–14 League Two
