= Steven Yawson =

English footballer (born 1999)

Personal information
- Full name: Steven Yawson
- Date of birth: 31 August 1999 (age 27)
- Position: Forward

Team information
- Current team: Lancaster City

Youth career
- Morecambe

Senior career*
Years	Team	Apps	(Gls)
2016–2018	Morecambe	2	(0)
2017	→ Kendal Town (loan)	5	(5)
2018—2019	→ Kendal Town	3	(2)
2019-2020	Prescot Cables	7	(0)
2020-2022	Milnthorpe Corinthians	28	(28)
2022-	→ Kendal Town	47	(18)
- * Club domestic league appearances and goals as of 18 June 2023

Steven Yawson (born 31 August 1999) is an English professional footballer who plays as a forward for Northern Premier League side Lancaster City.

== Career ==
Yawson came through the Morecambe Academy, and joined Kendal Town of the Northern Premier League Division One North on work experience on 24 January 2017. He scored a hat-trick on his debut four days later in a 5–0 win over Droylsden at Parkside Road. His loan proved to be more successful as he scored five goals in his first five games for the "Mintcakes", before manager David Foster extended his loan spell until the end of the 2016–17 season. He returned to Morecambe to make his first-team debut on 29 April 2017, coming on as a 77th-minute substitute for Paul Mullin in a 1–1 draw with Wycombe Wanderers at the Globe Arena. Yawson was loaned out to Kendal Town once again on 26 February 2018 for one month.

He was released by Morecambe at the end of the 2017–18 season. Which led to Yawson signing for Kendal Town on 22 August 2018. On 28 March 2019, Yawson signed for Prescot Cables who claim he is "a 19-year-old who is comfortable on the flanks and will add additional pace to the squad" He signed for West Lancs side Milnthorpe Corinthians in 2019–20 season and won the Westmorland County cup in his 1st season, becoming the club's top goalscorer with 28 goals scored.

In June 2022, Yawson was resigned to his former club, Kendal Town. Becoming a "fan favourite" that season, Yawson amassed 18 goals in 47 matches and was one of the first players to sign a new contract to the 2023/24 season.

== Career statistics ==
As of match played 1 January 2018

Appearances and goals by club, season and competition
Club	Season	League			FA Cup		League Cup		Other		Total	
Club	Season	Division	Apps	Goals	Apps	Goals	Apps	Goals	Apps	Goals	Apps	Goals
Morecambe	2016–17	League Two	1	0	0	0	0	0	0	0	1	0
Morecambe	2017–18	League Two	0	0	0	0	0	0	1 (Note: Appearance in the EFL Trophy)	0	1	0
Career total (Note: Statistics for Kendal Town not recorded.)			1	0	0	0	0	0	1	0	2	0
