= 2017–18 Morecambe F.C. season =

Morecambe
2017–18 season
- Chairman: Peter McGuigan
- Manager: Jim Bentley
- Stadium: Globe Arena
- League Two: 22nd
- FA Cup: Second round
- EFL Cup: First round
- EFL Trophy: Group stage (4th)
- Biggest win: Morecambe 3–0 Hartlepool United; 4 November 2017
- Biggest defeat: Exeter City 4–1 Morecambe; 30 September 2017; Morecambe 0–3 Port Vale; 17 October 2017; Morecambe 1–4 Notts County; 26 December 2017; Cheltenham Town 3–0 Morecambe; 7 April 2018
| Home colours | Away colours | Third colours |
- All statistics correct as of match played 5 May 2018.

The 2017–18 season was Morecambe's eleventh consecutive season in League Two, the fourth tier of English football. They finished 22nd in League Two, and also competed in the FA Cup, EFL Cup and EFL Trophy, where they were eliminated in the second round, first round and group stage respectively.

The season page covers the period between 1 July 2017 and 30 June 2018.

== Competitions ==
=== Friendlies ===
As of 26 June 2017, Morecambe have announced six pre-season friendlies against Preston North End, Rochdale, Blackburn Rovers, AFC Fylde, Bamber Bridge and Lancaster City.

| 11 July 2017 | Bamber Bridge | 1–2 | Morecambe | Bamber Bridge |
| 19:30 BST | Carsley 14' | Report | Hedley 23'; Thompson 49' | Stadium: Irongate |

| 15 July 2017 Bay Trophy | Morecambe | 1–0 | Lancaster City | Morecambe |
| 15:00 BST | Fleming 90' | Report | | Stadium: Globe Arena |

| 18 July 2017 | Morecambe | 0–2 | Preston North End | Morecambe |
| 19:30 BST | | Report | Barkhuizen 36'; Pearson 56' | Stadium: Globe Arena |

| 21 July 2017 | Morecambe | 1–2 | Blackburn Rovers | Morecambe |
| 19:30 BST | Turner 38' | Report | Graham 10'; Bennett 31' | Stadium: Globe Arena |

| 25 July 2017 | AFC Fylde | 2–1 | Morecambe | Medlar-with-Wesham |
| 19:30 BST | Rowe 9'; Lund 57' (o.g.) | Report | Turner 67' | Stadium: Mill Farm; Referee: David Underwood |

| 29 July 2017 | Morecambe | 0–1 | Rochdale | Morecambe |
| 15:00 BST | | Report | Davies 53' | Stadium: Globe Arena; Referee: Graham Salisbury |

=== League Two ===
==== League table ====
| Pos | Team | Pld | W | D | L | GF | GA | GD | Pts | Promotion, qualification or relegation |
|---|---|---|---|---|---|---|---|---|---|---|
| 20 | Port Vale | 46 | 11 | 14 | 21 | 49 | 67 | −18 | 47 | |
| 21 | Forest Green Rovers | 46 | 13 | 8 | 25 | 54 | 77 | −23 | 47 | |
| 22 | Morecambe | 46 | 9 | 19 | 18 | 41 | 56 | −15 | 46 | |
| 23 | Barnet (R) | 46 | 12 | 10 | 24 | 46 | 65 | −19 | 46 | Relegation to the National League |
| 24 | Chesterfield (R) | 46 | 10 | 8 | 28 | 47 | 83 | −36 | 38 | Relegation to the National League |

Source: BBC Sport
Rules for classification: 1) Points; 2) Goal difference; 3) Number of goals scored
(R) Relegated

==== Result summary ====
| Overall | | | | | | | | Home | | | | | | Away | | | | | |
| Pld | W | D | L | GF | GA | GD | Pts | W | D | L | GF | GA | GD | W | D | L | GF | GA | GD |
|---|---|---|---|---|---|---|---|---|---|---|---|---|---|---|---|---|---|---|---|
| 46 | 9 | 19 | 18 | 41 | 56 | −15 | 46 | 6 | 9 | 8 | 22 | 27 | −5 | 3 | 10 | 10 | 19 | 29 | −10 |

Last updated: 5 May 2018.

==== Results by matchday ====
| Matchday | 1 | 2 | 3 | 4 | 5 | 6 | 7 | 8 | 9 | 10 | 11 | 12 | 13 | 14 | 15 | 16 | 17 | 18 | 19 | 20 | 21 | 22 | 23 | 24 | 25 | 26 | 27 | 28 | 29 | 30 | 31 | 32 | 33 | 34 | 35 | 36 | 37 | 38 | 39 | 40 | 41 | 42 |
|---|---|---|---|---|---|---|---|---|---|---|---|---|---|---|---|---|---|---|---|---|---|---|---|---|---|---|---|---|---|---|---|---|---|---|---|---|---|---|---|---|---|---|
| Ground | H | A | H | A | H | A | A | H | A | H | A | H | A | H | H | A | H | A | H | A | H | A | A | H | H | A | H | A | A | H | A | H | H | A | | | | | | | | |
| Result | W | D | L | D | L | L | D | W | L | D | L | L | W | L | D | L | W | D | L | D | W | L | L | L | W | W | D | L | D | L | D | | | | | | | | | | | |
| Position | 6 | 5 | 13 | 15 | 19 | 20 | 20 | 16 | 19 | 20 | 21 | 21 | 20 | 21 | 22 | 23 | 19 | 20 | 22 | 21 | 18 | 19 | 19 | 19 | 19 | 19 | 19 | 20 | 20 | 20 | 20 | | | | | | | | | | | |

Updated to match(es) played on 3 February 2018. Source: Statto.com
A = Away; H = Home; W = Win; D = Draw; L = Loss

==== Matches ====
On 21 June 2017, the league fixtures were announced.

| 5 August 2017 1 | Morecambe | 2–1 | Cheltenham Town | Morecambe |
| 15:00 BST | Thompson 55', 90+1'; Wildig (yellow card) 85' | Report | Eisa 43'; Atangana (yellow card) 52' | Stadium: Globe Arena; Attendance: 1,450; Referee: Anthony Coggins |

| 12 August 2017 2 | Lincoln City | 1–1 | Morecambe | Lincoln |
| 15:00 BST | Green 70' | Report | Wildig 53' | Stadium: Sincil Bank; Attendance: 8,060; Referee: Gavin Ward |

| 19 August 2017 3 | Morecambe | 0–1 | Swindon Town | Morecambe |
| 15:00 BST | Rose (yellow card) 36' | Report | McDermott 13'; Mullin (yellow card) 80' | Stadium: Globe Arena; Attendance: 1,655; Referee: Mark Heywood |

| 26 August 2017 4 | Cambridge United | 0–0 | Morecambe | Cambridge |
| 15:00 BST | | Report | Lund (yellow card) 34'; Conlan (yellow card) 49' | Stadium: Abbey Stadium; Attendance: 4,573; Referee: Graham Horwood |

| 2 September 2017 5 | Morecambe | 1–2 | Accrington Stanley | Morecambe |
| 15:00 BST | Oliver (red card) 57'; Brough (yellow card) 60'; Campbell (yellow card) 62'; Müller (yellow card) 76'; Ellison 90+5' | Report | Kee 31'; Jackson (yellow card) 63'; Clark 90' | Stadium: Globe Arena; Attendance: 2,059; Referee: Peter Bankes |

| 9 September 2017 6 | Notts County | 2–0 | Morecambe | Nottingham |
| 15:00 BST | Jones 27'; Hewitt (yellow card) 65'; Forte 85' | Report | Rose (yellow card) 26'; Müller (yellow card) 88' | Stadium: Meadow Lane; Attendance: 5,305; Referee: Richard Clark |

| 12 September 2017 7 | Yeovil Town | 2–2 | Morecambe | Yeovil |
| 19:45 BST | Zoko 37'; Krysiak (yellow card) 58'; Surridge 65' | Report | Old (yellow card) 17'; McGurk 66'; Ellison 77'; Brough (yellow card) 90+2' | Stadium: Huish Park; Attendance: 2,205; Referee: Craig Hicks |

| 16 September 2017 8 | Morecambe | 2–1 | Newport County | Morecambe |
| 15:00 BST | Ellison 34', 80'; McGurk (yellow card) 85'; McGowan (yellow card) 90' | Report | Bennett 36'; Demetriou (yellow card) 42' | Stadium: Globe Arena; Attendance: 1,189; Referee: Darren Drysdale |

| 23 September 2017 9 | Stevenage | 2–1 | Morecambe | Stevenage |
| 15:00 BST | Godden 27'; Wootton 66'; Gorman (yellow card) 90' | Report | Old 36'; Thompson (yellow card) 75' | Stadium: Broadhall Way; Attendance: 1,996; Referee: John Busby |

| 26 September 2017 10 | Morecambe | 0–0 | Luton Town | Morecambe |
| 19:45 BST | | Report | Lee (yellow card) 50' | Stadium: Globe Arena; Attendance: 1,354; Referee: Darren Handley |

| 30 September 2017 11 | Exeter City | 4–1 | Morecambe | Exeter |
| 15:00 BST | Brown 4'; Stockley 24', 45+6'; Croll (yellow card) 45+1'; Moxey 48' (yellow card) 55'; Pym (yellow card) 81' | Report | Lund (yellow card) 34'; Oliver 38'; Thompson (yellow card) 73'; Müller (yellow card) 90+4' | Stadium: St James Park; Attendance: 3,651; Referee: Brett Huxtable |

| 7 October 2017 12 | Morecambe | 0–1 | Crawley Town | Morecambe |
| 15:00 BST | Campbell (yellow card) 29'; Ellison (red card) 34' | Report | Clifford 18'; Sanoh (yellow card) 36'; Roberts (yellow card) 45+2'; McNerney (yellow card) 87' | Stadium: Globe Arena; Attendance: 1,222; Referee: Anthony Backhouse |

| 14 October 2017 13 | Chesterfield | 0–2 | Morecambe | Chesterfield |
| 15:00 BST | Weir (yellow card) 31' | Report | McGurk 17'; Kenyon (yellow card) 19'; Thompson 47'; Oliver (yellow card) 90+2' | Stadium: Proact Stadium; Attendance: 4,489; Referee: Darren Drysdale |

| 17 October 2017 14 | Morecambe | 0–3 | Port Vale | Morecambe |
| 19:45 BST | | Report | Pope 18', 67'; Anderson (yellow card) 34'; Montaño 90+2' | Stadium: Globe Arena; Attendance: 1,241; Referee: Ross Joyce |

| 21 October 2017 15 | Morecambe | 0–0 | Grimsby Town | Morecambe |
| 15:00 BST | Wildig (yellow card) 73' | Report | Jones (yellow card) 35' | Stadium: Globe Arena; Attendance: 1,525; Referee: Ben Toner |

| 28 October 2017 16 | Forest Green Rovers | 2–0 | Morecambe | Nailsworth |
| 15:00 BST | Marsh-Brown 30'; Laird 64' | Report | Conlan (yellow card) 45+3'; McGurk (yellow card) 85' | Stadium: The New Lawn; Attendance: 2,515; Referee: Charles Breakspear |

| 11 November 2017 17 | Morecambe | 2–1 | Wycombe Wanderers | Morecambe |
| 15:00 GMT | Old 27'; McGurk 43' | Report | Saunders (yellow card) 26'; Akinfenwa 82'; Stewart (yellow card) 90' | Stadium: Globe Arena; Attendance: 1,472; Referee: Andy Haines |

| 18 November 2017 18 | Colchester United | 0–0 | Morecambe | Colchester |
| 15:00 GMT | | Report | | Stadium: Colchester Community Stadium; Attendance: 2,872; Referee: Lee Collins |

| 21 November 2017 19 | Morecambe | 0–1 | Crewe Alexandra | Morecambe |
| 19:45 GMT | | Report | Ng (yellow card) 61' (goal) 85' | Stadium: Globe Arena; Attendance: 927; Referee: Scott Oldham |

| 25 November 2017 20 | Carlisle United | 1–1 | Morecambe | Carlisle |
| 15:00 GMT | Etuhu 51'; Lambe (yellow card) 77' | Report | Old (yellow card) 7'; Thompson 72' | Stadium: Brunton Park; Attendance: 5,010; Referee: Darren Handley |

| 9 December 2017 21 | Morecambe | 2–0 | Coventry City | Morecambe |
| 15:00 GMT | McGurk (yellow card) 10'; Oliver 36'; Lang 69'; Fleming (yellow card) 72'; Rose (yellow card) 84' | Report | | Stadium: Globe Arena; Attendance: 1,773; Referee: Robert Lewis |

| 16 December 2017 22 | Barnet | 2–1 | Morecambe | Canons Park |
| 15:00 GMT | Campbell-Ryce 30'; Taylor 34'; Coulthirst (yellow card) 62' | Report | Müller (yellow card) 45+1'; Campbell 72' | Stadium: The Hive Stadium; Attendance: 1,123; Referee: (England) Dean Whitestone |

| 23 December 2017 23 | Mansfield Town | 2–1 | Morecambe | Mansfield |
| 15:00 GMT | Hemmings 8'; Hamilton (yellow card) 59'; Rose 88' (yellow card) 90+5'; White (yellow card) 90+3' | Report | Lang 50'; Ellison (yellow card) 87'; Roche (yellow card) 90+5' | Stadium: Field Mill; Attendance: 3,058; Referee: (England) Ross Joyce |

| 26 December 2017 24 | Morecambe | 1–4 | Notts County | Morecambe |
| 15:00 GMT | Lang 89' | Report | Grant 13' 59'; Alessandra 21' 86' | Stadium: Globe Arena; Attendance: 1,947; Referee: (England) Seb Stockbridge |

| 29 December 2017 25 | Morecambe | 4–3 | Yeovil Town | Morecambe |
| 19:45 GMT | Müller (yellow card) 27'; Oliver 72'; Lang 79' 85'; Ellison 90+2' (yellow card) 90+3'; Rose (yellow card) 90+5' | Report | Gray 1'; Khan 17'; Smith (yellow card) 63'; Krysiak (yellow card) 79'; Sowunmi 84' | Stadium: Globe Arena; Attendance: 1,124; Referee: (England) Darren Handley |

| 6 January 2018 26 | Grimsby Town | 0–2 | Morecambe | Cleethorpes |
| 15:00 GMT | Summerfield (yellow card) 34' | Report | Ellison 10'; Lavelle (yellow card) 37'; Kenyon (yellow card) 38'; Old 41' | Stadium: Blundell Park; Attendance: 3,104; Referee: (England) Anthony Backhouse |

| 13 January 2018 27 | Morecambe | 1–1 | Stevenage | Morecambe |
| 15:00 | Ellison 23'; Rose (yellow card) 34'; Wildig (yellow card) 60'; Old (yellow card) 79' | Report | Smith (yellow card) 25'; Newton (yellow card) 65'; Franks 89' | Stadium: Globe Arena; Attendance: 1,268; Referee: (England) Tom Nield |

| 20 January 2018 28 | Luton Town | 1–0 | Morecambe | Luton |
| 15:00 | Mullins 64' | Report | Conlan (yellow card) 45'; Fleming (yellow card) 63' | Stadium: Kenilworth Road; Attendance: 8,476; Referee: (England) Trevor Kettle |

| 23 January 2018 29 | Newport County | 1–1 | Morecambe | Newport |
| 19:45 GMT | Tozer 14'; Bennett (yellow card) 22'; Willmott (yellow card) 90+3' | Report | McGurk (yellow card) 31'; Rose 77' (pen.) | Stadium: Rodney Parade; Attendance: 2,754; Referee: (England) Kevin Johnson |

| 27 January 2018 30 | Morecambe | 1–2 | Mansfield Town | Morecambe |
| 15:00 | Lavelle (yellow card) 22'; Lang 31'; McGowan (yellow card) 52' | Report | Diamond (yellow card) 40'; Rose 70'; Byrom (yellow card) 71'; Spencer 90+4' | Stadium: Globe Arena; Attendance: 1,416; Referee: (England) Seb Stockbridge |

| 3 February 2018 31 | Port Vale | 0–0 | Morecambe | Stoke-on-Trent |
| 15:00 | Kay (yellow card) 57' | Report | | Stadium: Vale Park; Attendance: 3,968; Referee: (England) Ben Toner |

| 10 February 2018 | Morecambe | Postponed | Chesterfield | Morecambe |
| 15:00 | | | | Stadium: Globe Arena |

| 17 February 2018 32 | Morecambe | 1–1 | Forest Green Rovers | Morecambe |
| 15:00 | McGowan (yellow card) 59'; Winnard (yellow card) 67'; Rose (yellow card) 84'; Conlan (yellow card) 89'; Wylde 90' | Report | Clements 13'; Grubb (yellow card) 78' | Stadium: Globe Arena; Attendance: 1,447; Referee: Anthony Backhouse |

| 24 February 2018 33 | Wycombe Wanderers | 2–4 | Morecambe | High Wycombe |
| 15:00 GMT | Freeman 65'; O'Nien 84' | Report | McGurk 3'; Ellison 26', (yellow card) 27', (goal) 38'; Wylde 52' | Stadium: Adams Park; Attendance: 4,672; Referee: Craig Hicks |

| 6 March 2018 34 | Accrington Stanley | 1–0 | Morecambe | Accrington |
| 19:45 GMT | Kee 45+2' (pen.); Brown (yellow card) 63'; Jackson (yellow card) 67' | Report | Rose (yellow card) 73'; Old (yellow card) 85' | Stadium: Crown Ground; Attendance: 1,769; Referee: Eddie Ilderton |

| 10 March 2018 35 | Crawley Town | 1–1 | Morecambe | Crawley |
| 15:00 GMT | Payne (yellow card) 69'; Connolly (yellow card) 83'; Yorwerth (yellow card) 90'; Ahearne-Grant 90+3' | Report | Lavelle (yellow card) 59'; Lang 90+1', (yellow card) 90+2' | Stadium: Broadfield Stadium; Attendance: 1,642; Referee: Brendan Malone |

| 17 March 2018 36 | Morecambe | 2–1 | Exeter City | Morecambe |
| 15:00 GMT | McGowan (yellow card) 36'; Lavelle 43'; Rose 78' | Report | Sweeney 37'; Moxey (yellow card) 45+2' | Stadium: Globe Arena; Attendance: 1,056; Referee: Carl Boyeson |

| 20 March 2018 37 | Morecambe | 0–0 | Colchester United | Morecambe |
| 19:45 GMT | McGurk (yellow card) 67'; Rose (yellow card) 70' | Report | Mandron (yellow card) 71' | Stadium: Globe Arena; Attendance: 893; Referee: Richard Clark |

| 24 March 2018 38 | Morecambe | 0–0 | Lincoln City | Morecambe |
| | | Report | Rowe (yellow card) 85' | Stadium: Globe Arena; Attendance: 1,883; Referee: Eddie Ilderton |

| 30 March 2018 39 | Swindon Town | 1–1 | Morecambe | Swindon |
| 15:00 BST | Norris 55' (pen.); Hussey (yellow card) 60' | Report | Lang 43' | Stadium: County Ground; Attendance: 6,328; Referee: Kevin Johnson |

| 7 April 2018 40 | Cheltenham Town | 3–0 | Morecambe | Cheltenham |
| 15:00 BST | Sellars 58'; Boyle 65'; Pell 73' | Report | Wylde (yellow card) 55'; Winnard (yellow card) 90' | Stadium: LCI Rail Stadium; Attendance: 2,420; Referee: Lee Swabey |

| 10 April 2018 41 | Morecambe | 2–2 | Chesterfield | Morecambe |
| 19:45 BST | Thompson 16' (yellow card) 26'; Kenyon (yellow card) 26'; Lang 33' | Report | Dennis 55'; Kellett 74'; Brown (yellow card) 76' | Stadium: Globe Arena; Attendance: 1,042; Referee: Martin Coy |

| 14 April 2018 42 | Morecambe | 1–1 | Carlisle United | Morecambe |
| 15:00 BST | Conlan (yellow card) 13'; Lang 29' | Report | Devitt 14', (yellow card) 69' | Stadium: Globe Arena; Attendance: 3,319; Referee: John Brooks |

| 21 April 2018 43 | Crewe Alexandra | 1–0 | Morecambe | Crewe |
| 15:00 BST | Miller 88' | Report | McGurk (yellow card) 34' | Stadium: Gresty Road; Attendance: 3,942; Referee: Charles Breakspear |

| 24 April 2018 44 | Morecambe | 0–0 | Cambridge United | Morecambe |
| 19:45 BST | Lavelle (yellow card) 56'; Kenyon (yellow card) 78' | Report | Carroll (yellow card) 55' | Stadium: Globe Arena; Attendance: 992; Referee: Ross Joyce |

| 28 April 2018 45 | Morecambe | 0–1 | Barnet | Morecambe |
| 15:00 BST | Oliver (yellow card) 77' | Report | Brindley (yellow card) 38'; Nicholls 79' | Stadium: Globe Arena; Attendance: 2,073; Referee: Geoff Eltringham |

| 5 May 2018 46 | Coventry City | 0–0 | Morecambe | Coventry |
| 15:00 BST | Grimmer (yellow card) 40' | Report | | Stadium: Ricoh Arena; Attendance: 15,874; Referee: Andy Davies |

=== FA Cup ===
On 16 October 2017, Morecambe were drawn at home against Hartlepool United in the first round. An away fixture against Shrewsbury Town was confirmed for the second round.

| 4 November 2017 First round | Morecambe | 3–0 | Hartlepool United | Morecambe |
| 15:00 GMT | Ellison 4'; Fleming 67'; Loach 85' (o.g.) | Report | Donnelly (yellow card) 8'; Featherstone (yellow card) 79' | Stadium: Globe Arena; Attendance: 2,004; Referee: Tom Nield |

| 2 December 2017 Second round | Shrewsbury Town | 2–0 | Morecambe | Shrewsbury |
| 15:00 GMT | Rodman 32'; Whalley 37' (pen.); Payne (yellow card) 39' | Report | Roche (yellow card) 36'; Wildig (yellow card) 69' | Stadium: New Meadow; Attendance: 3,184; Referee: Craig Hicks |

=== EFL Cup ===
On 16 June 2017, Morecambe were drawn away to Barnsley in the first round.

| 8 August 2017 First round | Barnsley | 4–3 | Morecambe | Barnsley |
| 19:45 BST | Bradshaw 2', 46'; Ugbo 22'; Potts (yellow card) 71'; Yiadom (yellow card) 81'; Hedges 90+5' | Report | Campbell (yellow card) 36'; Lavelle 45+1' (yellow card) 65'; Rose 49' (pen.); Thompson (yellow card) 76'; Oliver 82' | Stadium: Oakwell; Referee: Darren Bond |

=== EFL Trophy ===
On 12 July 2017, the group stage draw was completed with Morecambe facing Carlisle United, Leicester City U23s and Fleetwood Town in Northern Group A.

| Pos | Lge | Team | Pld | W | PW | PL | L | GF | GA | GD | Pts | Qualification |
|---|---|---|---|---|---|---|---|---|---|---|---|---|
| 1 | L1 | Fleetwood Town (Q) | 3 | 3 | 0 | 0 | 0 | 7 | 2 | +5 | 9 | Round 2 |
| 2 | ACA | Leicester City U21 (Q) | 3 | 1 | 0 | 1 | 1 | 3 | 5 | −2 | 4 | Round 2 |
| 3 | L2 | Carlisle United (E) | 3 | 1 | 0 | 0 | 2 | 3 | 3 | 0 | 3 | |
| 4 | L2 | Morecambe (E) | 3 | 0 | 1 | 0 | 2 | 3 | 6 | −3 | 2 | |

Updated to match(es) played on 8 November 2017. Source: EFL.com
(E) Eliminated; (Q) Qualified to the phase indicated

| 29 August 2017 | Morecambe | 0–2 | Carlisle United | Morecambe |
| 19:45 BST | Fleming (yellow card) 82' | Report | Hope 1'; Kennedy 44' | Stadium: Globe Arena; Attendance: 1,228 |

| 3 October 2017 | Fleetwood Town | 2–1 | Morecambe | Fleetwood |
| 19:45 BST | Burns 25'; McGowan 72' (o.g.); Ekpolo (yellow card) 90+4' | Report | Ekpolo 51' (o.g.) | Stadium: Highbury Stadium; Attendance: 768; Referee: Eddie Ilderton |

| 7 November 2017 | Morecambe | 2–2 (4–2 p) | Leicester City U21s | Morecambe |
| 19:45 GMT | Thompson 8'; Osborne 90' | Report | Ndukwu 25'; Knight 85' | Stadium: Globe Arena; Attendance: 432; Referee: Robert Jones |
| | Penalties |
| | Rose (penalty scored); Turner (penalty missed); Lavelle (penalty scored); Osborne (penalty scored); Campbell (penalty scored) | | Choudhury (penalty scored); Knight (penalty missed); Gordon (penalty missed); Uche (penalty scored) |

== Transfers ==
=== Transfers in ===
| Date from | Position | Nationality | Name | From | Fee | Ref. |
|---|---|---|---|---|---|---|
| 1 July 2017 | LB | ENG | Patrick Brough | Carlisle United | Free | |
| 1 July 2017 | CF | ENG | Adam Campbell | Notts County | Free | |
| 1 July 2017 | CF | ENG | Vadaine Oliver | York City | Free | |
| 1 July 2017 | RW | ENG | Garry Thompson | Wycombe Wanderers | Free | |
| 22 July 2017 | ST | WAL | Reece Deakin | Airbus UK Broughton | Free | |
| 27 July 2017 | CB | NZL | Steven Old | GAIS | Free | |
| 1 August 2017 | CB | SCO | Samuel Lavelle | Bolton Wanderers | Free | |
| 31 August 2017 | CF | NIR | Adam McGurk | Cambridge United | Free | |

=== Transfers out ===
| Date from | Position | Nationality | Name | To | Fee | Ref. |
|---|---|---|---|---|---|---|
| 1 July 2017 | CB | ENG | Ryan Edwards | Plymouth Argyle | Undisclosed | |
| 1 July 2017 | LM | ENG | Lee Molyneux | Guiseley A.F.C. | Released | |
| 1 July 2017 | CF | ENG | Paul Mullin | Swindon Town | Undisclosed | |
| 1 July 2017 | DM | ENG | Peter Murphy | Retired | —N/a | |
| 1 July 2017 | CB | ENG | Liam Wakefield | Boston Utd | Released | |

=== Loans in ===
| Start date | Position | Nationality | Name | From | End date | Ref. |
|---|---|---|---|---|---|---|
| 3 July 2017 | RB | ENG | Mitchell Lund | Doncaster Rovers | End of Season | |
| 9 August 2017 | CM | ENG | Elliot Osborne | Fleetwood Town | January 2018 | |
| 22 August 2017 | CB | GER | Max Müller | Wycombe Wanderers | End of Season | |
| 31 August 2017 | CF | ENG | Callum Lang | Wigan Athletic | End of Season | |
| January 2018 | MF | ENG | Gregg Wylde | Plymouth Argyle | End of Season | |

=== Loans out ===
| Start date | Position | Nationality | Name | To | End date | Ref. |
|---|---|---|---|---|---|---|
| 15 August 2017 | MF | ENG | Ben Hedley | Witton Albion | 12 September 2017 | |
| 24 August 2017 | GK | ENG | Niall Maher | Halesowen Town | 21 September 2017 | |
