= Kezie Ibe =

English footballer

Personal information
- Full name: Kezieh Ibe
- Date of birth: 6 December 1982 (age 43)
- Place of birth: Camden, England
- Position: Striker

Team information
- Current team: Enfield Town

Youth career
- 1993–1997: Arsenal
- 1997–2000: Bournemouth

Senior career*
Years	Team	Apps	(Gls)
2001	Leatherhead		
2001–2002	Hampton & Richmond Borough	18	(2)
2002–2003	Aylesbury United	38	(6)
2003–2004	Staines Town	63	(30)
2004–2005	Yeovil Town	3	(0)
2004	→ Tiverton Town (loan)	7	(4)
2004–2005	→ Exeter City (loan)	4	(1)
2005	→ Weymouth (loan)	3	(1)
2005	→ St Albans City (loan)	7	(3)
2005–2006	Canvey Island	33	(6)
2006–2008	Chelmsford City	75	(28)
2008–2009	Ebbsfleet United	26	(4)
2009	→ AFC Wimbledon (loan)	5	(1)
2009–2011	Farnborough	40	(15)
2011–2012	Chelmsford City	37	(7)
2012–2013	Sutton United	8	(0)
2012–2013	→ Eastbourne Borough (loan)	6	(1)
2013	Eastbourne Borough	3	(0)
2013–2014	Basingstoke Town	19	(5)
2014–2017	Hendon	130	(30)
2017–2018	Harlow Town	7	(0)
2018	Beaconsfield Town	9	(4)
2018–2019	Egham Town	15	(3)
2019–	Enfield Town	1	(0)
- * Club domestic league appearances and goals as of 22:43, 17 January 2019 (UTC)

Kezieh Ibe (born 6 December 1982) is an English footballer who plays for Enfield Town as a striker.

He has previously played for Yeovil Town in the Football League, and several non-League clubs including Ebbsfleet United, Farnborough and twice for Chelmsford City.

His most recent transfer was from Egham Town of the Isthmian League South Central Division to Enfield Town of the Premier Division, in January 2019.
