= 2020–21 Morecambe F.C. season =

Morecambe
2020–21 season
- Co-chairmen: Graham Howse & Rod Taylor
- Manager: Derek Adams
- Stadium: Mazuma Stadium
- League Two: 4th
- Play-offs: Winners
- FA Cup: Third round
- EFL Cup: Third round
- EFL Trophy: Group Stage (4th)
- Top goalscorer: League: Carlos Mendes Gomes (15); All: Carlos Mendes Gomes (16)
- Average home league attendance: 0 (Note: Entire regular season played behind closed doors due to the COVID-19 pandemic, however approximately 1,500 did attend the home leg of the Play-off semi-final.)
- Biggest win: Morecambe 4–0 Manchester United U23; 18 November 2020
- Biggest defeat: Morecambe 0–7 Newcastle United; 23 September 2020
Home colours	Away colours
- All statistics correct as of match played 31 May 2021.

The 2020–21 season was Morecambe's 100th season since formation and their 14th consecutive season in League Two, the fourth tier of English football. It ended with the club being promoted to League One for the first time in their history, following playoff wins against Tranmere Rovers and, in the final, Newport County. They also competed in the FA Cup, EFL Cup and EFL Trophy.

The season was severely disrupted by the COVID-19 pandemic, with all matches except the play-offs taking place behind closed doors.

== Pre-season ==
Due to the late start to the season, and lack of preparation time, Morecambe's pre-season was limited to just three matches against Manchester United U23s, Workington and Everton U23s.

22 August 2020 Friendly	Manchester United U23	1–1	Morecambe	Carrington
	Galbraith		Mendes Gomes	Stadium: Aon Training Complex; Attendance: 0

25 August 2020 Friendly	Morecambe	1–0	Workington	Morecambe
19:45 BST	Stockton 54'	Report		Stadium: Mazuma Stadium; Attendance: 0 Referee: Darren Handley

29 August 2020 Friendly	Everton U23	0–1	Morecambe	Halewood
15:00 BST			Stockton 12'	Stadium: USM Finch Farm; Attendance: 0

== Competitions ==
=== EFL League Two ===
==== League table ====
Pos	Team	Pld	W	D	L	GF	GA	GD	Pts	Promotion, qualification or relegation
1	Cheltenham Town (C, P)	46	24	10	12	61	39	+22	82	Promotion to the EFL League One
2	Cambridge United (P)	46	24	8	14	73	49	+24	80	Promotion to the EFL League One
3	Bolton Wanderers (P)	46	23	10	13	59	50	+9	79	Promotion to the EFL League One
4	Morecambe (O, P)	46	23	9	14	69	58	+11	78	Qualification for League Two play-offs
5	Newport County	46	20	13	13	57	42	+15	73	Qualification for League Two play-offs
6	Forest Green Rovers	46	20	13	13	59	51	+8	73	Qualification for League Two play-offs
7	Tranmere Rovers	46	20	13	13	55	50	+5	73	Qualification for League Two play-offs
8	Salford City	46	19	14	13	54	34	+20	71	

Updated to match(es) played on 31 May 2021. Source: EFL Official Website
Rules for classification: 1) Points; 2) Goal difference; 3) Number of goals scored; 4) Head-to-head results; 5) Wins; 6) Away goals; 7) Penalty points (sec 9.5); 8) 12-point sending off offences
(C) Champions; (O) Play-off winners; (P) Promoted

==== Results summary ====
Overall								Home						Away					
Pld	W	D	L	GF	GA	GD	Pts	W	D	L	GF	GA	GD	W	D	L	GF	GA	GD
46	23	9	14	69	58	+11	78	13	5	5	38	27	+11	10	4	9	31	31	0

Last updated: 8 May 2021.
Source: BBC

==== Results by matchday ====
Matchday	1	2	3	4	5	6	7	8	9	10	11	12	13	14	15	16	17	18	19	20	21	22	23	24	25	26	27	28	29	30	31	32	33	34	35	36	37	38	39	40	41	42	43	44	45	46
Ground	A	H	A	H	A	A	H	H	A	A	H	H	A	A	H	A	H	H	A	H	A	H	H	A	H	A	A	A	A	H	A	H	H	A	H	A	H	A	H	A	H	H	A	H	A	H
Result	W	L	W	W	W	L	D	L	L	W	D	D	D	L	W	L	W	W	W	W	L	D	W	W	L	D	D	L	W	W	L	W	W	D	L	W	W	L	D	L	W	W	W	L	W	W
Position	4	14	5	2	1	6	6	11	12	10	9	10	10	14	11	12	10	8	5	5	9	8	6	3	6	7	6	8	4	4	5	5	4	5	7	6	6	6	5	5	4	4	4	4	4	4

Updated to match(es) played on 8 May 2021. Source: 11v11 for league tables and fixtures
A = Away; H = Home; W = Win; D = Draw; L = Loss

==== Matches ====
The 2020–21 season fixtures were released on 21 August.

12 September 2020 1	Cheltenham Town	1–2	Morecambe	Cheltenham
15:00 BST	May 28'	Report	Davis (yellow card) 40'; Phillips 78' (pen.); Mendes Gomes 90+1'	Stadium: Jonny-Rocks Stadium; Attendance: 0 Referee: Carl Brook

19 September 2020 2	Morecambe	0–5	Cambridge United	Morecambe
15:00 BST	Diagouraga (yellow card) 58'; Mendes Gomes (yellow card) 60'	Report	Hoolahan 29'; Turner 34' (o.g.); May 37'; Mullin 54', 64'	Stadium: Mazuma Stadium; Attendance: 0 Referee: Ben Speedie

26 September 2020 3	Southend United	1–2	Morecambe	Southend-on-Sea
15:00 BST	Gibson 5' (o.g.); Taylor (yellow card) 15'; Demetriou (yellow card) 37'	Report	Phillips (yellow card) 33' (goal) 73'; Kenyon (yellow card) 37'; Wildig 55'	Stadium: Roots Hall; Attendance: 0 Referee: Charles Breakspear

3 October 2020 4	Morecambe	1–0	Port Vale	Morecambe
15:00 BST	Phillips 76' (pen.); Gibson (yellow card) 85'; O'Sullivan (yellow card) 90+5'	Report	Legge (yellow card) 77'	Stadium: Mazuma Stadium; Attendance: 0 Referee: Bobby Madley

10 October 2020 5	Oldham Athletic	2–3	Morecambe	Oldham
15:00 BST	McAleny 52', 90'	Report	Wildig 42'; Gibson (yellow card) 57'; Kenyon 59'; Stockton 66'	Stadium: Boundary Park; Attendance: 0 Referee: Josh Smith

17 October 2020 6	Crawley Town	4–0	Morecambe	Crawley
15:00 BST	Francomb 52' (yellow card) 54'; Watters 67', 71'; Frost 77'	Report		Stadium: The People's Pension Stadium; Attendance: 0 Referee: John Busby

20 October 2020 7	Morecambe	1–1	Mansfield Town	Morecambe
18:30 BST	Phillips 3' (yellow card) 35'; Lavelle (yellow card) 50'; Cooney (yellow card) 82'	Report	Charsley 26'; McLaughlin (yellow card) 29'	Stadium: Mazuma Stadium; Attendance: 0 Referee: Marc Edwards

24 October 2020 8	Morecambe	1–2	Forest Green Rovers	Morecambe
15:00 BST	Leitch-Smith 19'; Lavelle (yellow card) 21'; Hendrie (yellow card) 64'; Wildig (yellow card) 74'; Knight-Percival (yellow card) 87'	Report	Godwin-Malife (yellow card) 74'; Young 79'; Matt 83' (yellow card) 87'	Stadium: Mazuma Stadium; Attendance: 0 Referee: Michael Salisbury

27 October 2020 9	Carlisle United	3–1	Morecambe	Carlisle
19:00 GMT	Songo'o 1' (o.g.); Mellish 3'; Riley (yellow card) 37'; Tanner 87'; Reilly (yellow card) 89'	Report	O'Sullivan (yellow card) 50'; Songo'o 79' (yellow card) 81'	Stadium: Brunton Park; Attendance: 0 Referee: Ross Joyce

31 October 2020 10	Tranmere Rovers	0–1	Morecambe	Birkenhead
15:00 GMT	Khan (yellow card) 50'	Report	Phillips 57' (pen.)	Stadium: Prenton Park; Attendance: 0 Referee: Craig Hicks

3 November 2020 11	Morecambe	2–2	Exeter City	Morecambe
18:30 GMT	Mendes Gomes 41'; Hendrie 45+1'	Report	Randall 33' (yellow card) 65'; Taylor 72'	Stadium: Mazuma Stadium; Attendance: 0 Referee: Ollie Yates

14 November 2020 12	Morecambe	1–1	Stevenage	Morecambe
15:00 GMT	Knight-Percival (yellow card) 8'; Slew 80'; Mendes Gomes (yellow card) 87'	Report	Oteh 27' (pen.) (yellow card) 77'; Hutton (yellow card) 59'	Stadium: Mazuma Stadium; Attendance: 0 Referee: Tom Nield

21 November 2020 13	Scunthorpe United	1–1	Morecambe	Scunthorpe
15:00 GMT	Onariase 80'; Rowe (yellow card) 90+5'	Report	Wildig 90+3'; Cooney (yellow card) 90+5'	Stadium: Sands Venue Stadium; Attendance: 0 Referee: Peter Wright

24 November 2020 14	Salford City	2–1	Morecambe	Salford
19:00 GMT	Denny (yellow card) 6'; Smith (yellow card) 10'; Henderson (yellow card) 28'; Andrade (yellow card) 36'; Hunter 41', 44'; Elliott (yellow card) 86'	Report	Lavelle (yellow card) 40'; Stockton 54'; Songo'o (yellow card) 60'; Cooney (yellow card) 90+3'	Stadium: Moor Lane; Attendance: 0 Referee: Neil Hair

1 December 2020 15	Morecambe	1–0	Barrow	Morecambe
18:30 GMT	Mendes Gomes 12'; Davis (yellow card) 25'; Songo'o (yellow card) 70'	Report	Hird (red card) 15'	Stadium: Mazuma Stadium; Attendance: 0 Referee: Thomas Bramall

5 December 2020 16	Newport County	2–1	Morecambe	Newport
15:00 GMT	Amond 11'; Dolan 83' (pen.)	Report	Davis (yellow card) 30'; Mendes Gomes 32'; Hendrie (yellow card) 34'; Phillips (yellow card) 68' (yellow-red card) 82'	Stadium: Rodney Parade; Attendance: 0 Referee: Sam Purkiss

12 December 2020 17	Morecambe	1–0	Harrogate Town	Morecambe
15:00 GMT	Wildig 56' (yellow card) 84'; Halstead (yellow card) 89'	Report		Stadium: Mazuma Stadium; Attendance: 0 Referee: Ollie Yates

15 December 2020 18	Morecambe	2–1	Leyton Orient	Morecambe
18:30 GMT	Davis (yellow card) 11'; Lavelle 56' (yellow card) 78'; Mendes Gomes 73'; Songo'o (yellow card) 86'; Leitch-Smith (yellow card) 90+3'	Report	Johnson 18'; Angol (yellow card) 44'; Clay (yellow card) 68'; Sotiriou (yellow card) 86'; Vigouroux (yellow card) 89'	Stadium: Mazuma Stadium; Attendance: 0

19 December 2020 19	Colchester United	1–2	Morecambe	Colchester
15:00 GMT	Stockton 24' (o.g.)	Report	O'Sullivan 8'; Cooney (yellow card) 23'; Songo'o 61'; Mendes Gomes (yellow card) 90+2'	Stadium: JobServe Community Stadium; Attendance: 1,094; Referee: Sam Allison

26 December 2020 20	Morecambe	3–1	Grimsby Town	Morecambe
15:00 GMT	Stockton (yellow card) 45'; Songo'o (yellow card) 56'; Mendes Gomes 58', 71'; Phillips 90+3'	Report	Pollock 21'	Stadium: Mazuma Stadium; Attendance: 0 Referee: Declan Bourne

16 January 2021 21	Leyton Orient	2–0	Morecambe	Leyton
15:00 GMT	Sotiriou (yellow card) 60'; Angol (yellow card) 83', (goal) 90+2'; Knight-Percival 88' (o.g.)	Report	Lyons (yellow card) 90+1'	Stadium: Breyer Group Stadium; Attendance: 0 Referee: Brett Huxtable

19 January 2021 22	Morecambe	1–1	Walsall	Morecambe
19:00 GMT	Stockton (yellow card) 40'; Lavelle (yellow card) 79'; Mendes Gomes 80'; Hendrie (yellow card) 88' Derek Adams (red card)	Report	Gordon 37'; Jules (yellow card) 40'	Stadium: Mazuma Stadium; Attendance: 0 Referee: Graham Salisbury

23 January 2021 23	Morecambe	3–0	Colchester United	Morecambe
15:00 GMT	Phillips 46'; Hendrie (yellow card) 55'; Diagouraga 58'; O'Sullivan 80'	Report	Pell (red card) 60'	Stadium: Mazuma Stadium; Attendance: 0 Referee: Robert Lewis

26 January 2021 24	Exeter City	0–2	Morecambe	Exeter
18:00 GMT	Maxted (yellow card) 8'	Report	Phillips 9' (pen.), (yellow card) 56'; Stockton 66'; Diagouraga (yellow card) 85'; Cooney (yellow card) 90+2'	Stadium: St James Park; Attendance: 0 Referee: Craig Hicks

30 January 2021 25	Morecambe	0–1	Tranmere Rovers	Morecambe
15:00 GMT	Phillips (penalty missed) 38'; Songo'o (red card) 45'; Cooney (yellow card) 62'; Hendrie (yellow card) 90+3'	Report	Spearing (yellow card) 65'; Woolery 74'	Stadium: Mazuma Stadium; Attendance: 0 Referee: Paul Howard

6 February 2021 26	Stevenage	2–2	Morecambe	Stevenage
15:00 GMT	List 8'; Norris 81'	Report	Diagouraga 28'; Stockton 32'; Cooney (yellow card) 90+1'	Stadium: Lamex Stadium; Attendance: 0 Referee: James Oldham

9 February 2021 27	Bolton Wanderers	1–1	Morecambe	Horwich
19:00 GMT	Doyle 43'; Maddison (red card) 73'; Williams (yellow card) 80'	Report	Lyons 83'	Stadium: University of Bolton Stadium; Attendance: Behind closed doors Referee: Oliver Langford

16 February 2021 28	Bradford City	2–1	Morecambe	Bradford
19:00 GMT	O'Connor 28'; Vernam 63'; Rowe (yellow card) 90+2'	Report	O'Sullivan 9', (yellow card) 65'; Gibson (yellow card) 45'; Wildig (yellow card) 57'	Stadium: Utilita Energy Stadium; Attendance: 0 Referee: Alan Young

20 February 2021 29	Barrow	1–2	Morecambe	Barrow-in-Furness
15:00 GMT	Banks (yellow card) 21'; Jones (yellow card) 26'; Quigley 65'	Report	Wildig 24'; Lavelle (yellow card) 52'; Songo'o (yellow card) 63'; Mellor 66'	Stadium: Progression Solicitors Stadium; Attendance: 0 Referee: Thomas Bramall

23 February 2021 30	Morecambe	2–1	Salford City	Morecambe
18:30 GMT	Songo'o (yellow card) 49'; Lavelle (yellow card) 90'; Mendes Gomes 90+4'; Wildig 90+6'	Report	Thomas-Asante 45+1'; Threlkeld (yellow card) 90+2'; Turnbull (yellow card) 90+5'; Hladký (yellow card) 90+9'	Stadium: Mazuma Stadium; Attendance: 0 Referee: Seb Stockbridge

27 February 2021 31	Mansfield Town	1–0	Morecambe	Mansfield
15:00 GMT	Sweeney (yellow card) 21'; Bowery 41'	Report	Gibson (yellow card) 20'; Lavelle (yellow card) 45'; Mellor (yellow card) 72'	Stadium: One Call Stadium; Attendance: 0 Referee: Anthony Backhouse

2 March 2021 32	Morecambe	3–1	Crawley Town	Morecambe
18:30 GMT	Stockton 5'; Mendes Gomes 59', 88'	Report	Nadesan 13'	Stadium: Mazuma Stadium; Attendance: 0 Referee: Oliver Langford

6 March 2021 33	Morecambe	3–1	Carlisle United	Morecambe
15:00 GMT	Lavelle (yellow card) 12'; Wildig 32'; Diagouraga 37'; Mellor (yellow card) 45+2'; Stockton 53'	Report	Alessandra (yellow card) 39'; Hayden 79'	Stadium: Mazuma Stadium; Attendance: 0 Referee: Sam Allison

9 March 2021 34	Forest Green Rovers	2–2	Morecambe	Nailsworth
19:00 GMT	Collins 10'; Stokes (yellow card) 23'; Bernard (yellow card) 38'; Matt 79'	Report	Stockton 22'; O'Sullivan (yellow card) 38'; Gibson (yellow card) 45+4'; Mendes Gomes 90+4'	Stadium: The innocent New Lawn; Attendance: 0 Referee: Trevor Kettle

13 March 2021 35	Morecambe	1–3	Newport County	Morecambe
15:00 GMT	Songo'o 20'; Lavelle (red card) 38'	Report	Dolan 8' (pen.); Sheehan 45+1'; Ellison 79'	Stadium: Mazuma Stadium; Attendance: 0 Referee: Andy Haines

20 March 2021 36	Harrogate Town	0–1	Morecambe	Harrogate
15:00 GMT	Jones (yellow card) 72'	Report	Smith 1' (o.g.); Knight-Percival (yellow card) 39' (yellow-red card) 75'; Stockton (yellow card) 45'; Gibson (yellow card) 89'; O'Sullivan (yellow card) 90+4'	Stadium: EnviroVent Stadium; Attendance: 0 Referee: Josh Smith

27 March 2021 37	Morecambe	1–0	Cheltenham Town	Morecambe
15:00 GMT	McAlinden 20'	Report		Stadium: Mazuma Stadium; Attendance: 0 Referee: Marc Edwards

2 April 2021 38	Cambridge United	2–1	Morecambe	Cambridge
15:00 BST	Mullin 18', 81' (pen.); Taylor (yellow card) 83'; Ironside (yellow card) 87'; Digby (yellow card) 90+3'; Burton (yellow card) 90+4'	Report	Mendes Gomes (yellow card) 51'; Gibson (red card) 55'; Wildig (yellow card) 82'; Price 88'	Stadium: Abbey Stadium; Attendance: 0 Referee: David Rock

6 April 2021 39	Morecambe	1–1	Southend United	Morecambe
18:30 BST	Stockton 56'	Report	Dieng 18'; Demetriou (yellow card) 68'	Stadium: Mazuma Stadium; Attendance: 0 Referee: Scott Oldham

10 April 2021 40	Port Vale	1–0	Morecambe	Burslem
15:00 BST	Oyeleke (yellow card) 14'; Brisley (yellow card) 26'; Smith 34'; Rodney (yellow card) 89'	Report	Lavelle (yellow card) 34'	Stadium: Vale Park; Attendance: 0 Referee: Antony Coggins

13 April 2021 41	Morecambe	4–1	Scunthorpe United	Morecambe
18:30 BST	Stockton 25'; Mendes Gomes 37'; Bedeau 49' (o.g.); Songo'o 60' (yellow card) 78'	Report	Howe (yellow card) 29'; Beestin 83'	Stadium: Mazuma Stadium; Attendance: 0 Referee: Declan Bourne

17 April 2021 42	Morecambe	4–3	Oldham Athletic	Morecambe
12:30 BST	Mendes Gomes 5', 53'; Wildig 42'; Stockton 45+1'	Report	McAleny 39'; Borthwick-Jackson 78'; Jameson 88'	Stadium: Mazuma Stadium; Attendance: 0 Referee: Michael Salisbury
Note: Kick-off brought forward from 15:00 to avoid clashing with the funeral of Prince Philip, Duke of Edinburgh.

20 April 2021 43	Grimsby Town	0–3	Morecambe	Cleethorpes
19:00 BST	Clifton (yellow card) 83'	Report	Stockton 22'; Songo'o 28'; Waterfall 81' (o.g.)	Stadium: Blundell Park; Attendance: 0 Referee: Paul Howard

24 April 2021 44	Morecambe	0–1	Bolton Wanderers	Morecambe
15:00 BST	Mellor (red card) 23'; Price (yellow card) 49'	Report	Afolayan (yellow card) 40'; Jackson 45+3'	Stadium: Mazuma Stadium; Attendance: 0 Referee: Carl Boyeson

1 May 2021 45	Walsall	0–2	Morecambe	Walsall
15:00 BST		Report	Stockton 45+2'; Songo'o (yellow card) 58' (goal) 76'	Stadium: Banks's Stadium; Attendance: 0 Referee: Lee Swabey

8 May 2021 46	Morecambe	2–0	Bradford City	Morecambe
15:00 BST	McAlinden 28'; Songo'o (yellow card) 38'; Stockton 57'; Diagouraga (yellow card) 79'	Report	Watt (yellow card) 62'	Stadium: Mazuma Stadium; Attendance: 0 Referee: Craig Hicks

==== Play-offs ====
Morecambe's 4th-place finish in the league saw them qualify for the play-offs for the first time in 11 years. They played 7th place Tranmere Rovers over two legs and edged the Merseysiders out 3–2 on aggregate to reach the final for the first time in their history.

20 May 2021 Semi-final 1st Leg	Tranmere Rovers	1–2	Morecambe	Birkenhead
18:00 BST	Clarke 19'; Spearing (yellow card) 54'; Vaughan (yellow card) 78'; Lloyd (yellow card) 83'; O'Connor (yellow card) 89'	Report	Knight-Percival 15'; McAlinden 45+1'; Lyons (yellow card) 87'; Mendes Gomes (yellow card) 89'	Stadium: Prenton Park; Attendance: 3,400; Referee: Darren Drysdale

23 May 2021 Semi-final 2nd Leg	Morecambe	1–1 (3–2 agg.)	Tranmere Rovers	Morecambe
12:30 BST	Wildig 9'; Cooney (yellow card) 76'	Report	Vaughan 53', (yellow card) 81'	Stadium: Mazuma Stadium; Attendance: 1,558; Referee: Thomas Bramall

==== Play-off Final ====
The semi-final victory over Tranmere saw Morecambe book their third trip to Wembley, after the 1974 FA Trophy Final and the 2007 Conference Play-off Final.

They played Welsh side Newport County for a place in League One, and prevailed thanks to a penalty from Carlos Mendes Gomes in the second period of extra time.

31 May 2021 Final	Morecambe	1–0 (a.e.t.)	Newport County	London
15:00 BST	Mendes Gomes 107' (pen.), (yellow card) 108'; O'Sullivan (yellow card) 112'	Report	Labadie (yellow card) 96'; Demetriou (yellow card) 120'	Stadium: Wembley Stadium; Attendance: 9,083; Referee: Bobby Madley

=== FA Cup ===
The draw for the first round proper was made on 26 October 2020 by Grant Holt. Morecambe were handed an away tie at eighth tier Maldon & Tiptree.

The draw for the second round proper was made on 9 November 2020 by Danny Cowley, with Morecambe drawn at home to Solihull Moors of the National League.

Robbie Savage drew the teams for the third round proper on 30 November 2020, with Morecambe being drawn away to Premier League giants (and eventual runners-up in the competition) Chelsea.

All draws were broadcast live on the BBC.

8 November 2020 First round	Maldon & Tiptree	0–1	Morecambe	Maldon
12:45 GMT	McNamara (yellow card) 42'; Stokes (yellow card) 90+1'	Report	Phillips 43' (pen.); Knight-Percival (yellow card) 69'	Stadium: Wallace Binder; Attendance: 0 Referee: Will Finnie

28 November 2020 Second round	Morecambe	4–2 (a.e.t.)	Solihull Moors	Morecambe
12:30 GMT	Wildig (yellow card) 22'; Lavelle (yellow card) 49'; Stockton 53', 59', 107'; O'Sullivan 95' (yellow card) 106'; Songo'o (yellow card) 100'; Davis (yellow card) 102'	Report	Hudlin 19'; Hancox (yellow card) 45+3'; Gleeson (yellow card) 49'; Cranston 69'; Williams (yellow card) 73'; Ward (yellow card) 90+3'; Coxe (yellow card) 107'	Stadium: Mazuma Stadium; Attendance: 0 Referee: Ben Speedie

10 January 2021 Third round	Chelsea	4–0	Morecambe	Fulham
13:30 GMT	Mount 18'; Werner 44'; Hudson-Odoi 49'; Havertz 85'	Report	Gibson (yellow card) 78'	Stadium: Stamford Bridge; Attendance: 0 Referee: Darren England

=== EFL Cup ===
The first round draw was made on 18 August, live on Sky Sports, by Paul Merson. The draw for both the second and third round were confirmed on 6 September, live on Sky Sports by Phil Babb.

5 September 2020 First round	Grimsby Town	1–1 (3–4 p)	Morecambe	Cleethorpes
15:00 BST	Green 34'	Report	Phillips 7'; Slew (yellow card) 44'	Stadium: Blundell Park; Attendance: 0 Referee: Graham Salisbury
	Penalties
	Pollock (penalty scored); Tilley (penalty missed); Preston (penalty scored); Edwards (penalty scored); McKeown (penalty missed)		Kenyon (penalty missed); McAlinden (penalty scored); Hendrie (penalty scored); Pringle (penalty scored); O'Sullivan (penalty scored)

15 September 2020 Second round	Morecambe	1–0	Oldham Athletic	Morecambe
19:45 BST	Wildig 22'; Kenyon (yellow card) 30'	Report	Badan (yellow card) 38'; Hamer (yellow card) 60'; Garrity (yellow card) 62'; Whelan (yellow card) 73'; Grant (yellow card) 90'	Stadium: Mazuma Stadium; Attendance: 0 Referee: Ben Toner

23 September 2020 Third round	Morecambe	0–7	Newcastle United	Morecambe
19:45 BST	Diagouraga (red card) 33'	Report	Joelinton 5', 31'; Almirón 20'; Murphy 27'; Hayden 45+2'; Lascelles 51'; Lavelle 90+1' (o.g.)	Stadium: Mazuma Stadium; Attendance: 0 Referee: Darren Drysdale

=== EFL Trophy ===
The regional group stage draw was confirmed on 18 August.

Pos	Div	Team	Pld	W	PW	PL	L	GF	GA	GD	Pts	Qualification
1	L2	Salford City	3	2	0	0	1	4	7	−3	6	Advance to Round 2
2	ACA	Manchester United U21	3	1	1	0	1	6	4	+2	5	Advance to Round 2
3	L1	Rochdale	3	1	0	1	1	3	3	0	4	
4	L2	Morecambe	3	1	0	0	2	5	4	+1	3	

Source: EFL.com

8 September 2020 Group stage	Morecambe	1–2	Rochdale	Morecambe
19:45 BST	Lavelle 23' (yellow card) 55'; O'Sullivan (yellow card) 62'	Report	Tavares 86'; Newby 90+3'	Stadium: Mazuma Stadium; Attendance: 0 Referee: Sam Barrott

29 September 2020 Group stage	Salford City	2–0	Morecambe	Salford
19:45 BST	Wilson 44'; Thomas-Asante (yellow card) 75'; Touray (yellow card) 79'; Hunter 90+2'	Report	Knight-Percival (yellow card) 1'; Hendrie (yellow card) 43'	Stadium: Moor Lane; Attendance: 0 Referee: James Bell

18 November 2020 Group stage	Morecambe	4–0	Manchester United U21	Morecambe
18:30 GMT	Cooney 24', 28'; Davis 34'; Price 62'; Hendrie (yellow card) 90+4'	Report		Stadium: Mazuma Stadium; Attendance: 0 Referee: Anthony Backhouse

== Transfers ==
=== Transfers in ===
Date	Position	Nationality	Name	From	Fee	Ref.
1 August 2020	LB	SCO	Stephen Hendrie	(Scotland) Kilmarnock	Free transfer	
2 August 2020	CB	ENG	Harry Davis	(England) Grimsby Town	Free transfer	
3 August 2020	CB	ENG	Nathaniel Knight-Percival	(England) Carlisle United	Free transfer	
4 August 2020	CF	IRE	Liam McAlinden	(England) Stockport County	Free transfer	
10 August 2020	LM	ENG	Ben Pringle	(England) Gillingham	Free transfer	
13 August 2020	RB	ENG	Kelvin Mellor	(England) Bradford City	Free transfer	
22 September 2020	LB	ENG	Liam Gibson	(England) Newcastle United	Free transfer	
23 September 2020	CB	CMR	Yann Songo'o	(England) Scunthorpe United	Free transfer	
26 January 2021	GK	WAL	Kyle Letheren	(England) Chesterfield	Free transfer	

=== Loans in ===
Date from	Position	Nationality	Name	From	Date until	Ref.
5 August 2020	GK	ENG	Jake Turner	(England) Newcastle United	Recalled Jan 2021	
11 August 2020	RB	ENG	Ryan Cooney	(England) Burnley	30 June 2021	
12 August 2020	DM	ENG	Adam Phillips	(England) Burnley	1 February 2021	
6 January 2021	CM	NIR	Brad Lyons	(England) Blackburn Rovers	30 June 2021	
22 January 2021	GK	ISL	Jökull Andrésson	(England) Reading	29 January 2021	
1 February 2021	DM	ENG	Alex Denny	(England) Salford City	End of season	

=== Transfers out ===
Date	Position	Nationality	Name	To	Fee	Ref.
1 July 2020	CB	ENG	Tom Brewitt	(United States) Tacoma Defiance	Released	
1 July 2020	RB	ENG	Adam Buxton	(Wales) Prestatyn Town	Released	
1 July 2020	LW	ENG	Kevin Ellison	(Wales) Newport County	Released	
1 July 2020	CF	ENG	Kyle Hawley	(England) Stalybridge Celtic	Released	
1 July 2020	CF	ENG	Michael Howard	(England) Marine	Released	
1 July 2020	CM	ENG	Lamin Jagne	Unattached	Released	
1 July 2020	CF	ENG	Rhys Oates	(England) Hartlepool United	Released	
1 July 2020	CB	NZL	Steven Old	(Scotland) East Kilbride	Rejected contract	
1 July 2020	GK	IRL	Barry Roche	Retired		
1 July 2020	CB	ENG	Ritchie Sutton	(England) Altrincham	Released	
1 July 2020	CM	ENG	Andrew Tutte	(England) Bolton Wanderers	Released	
7 August 2020	LB	WAL	Jordan Cranston	(England) Solihull Moors	Undisclosed	
11 September 2020	LB	NIR	Luke Conlan	(England) AFC Fylde	Undisclosed	
