= 2019–20 Morecambe F.C. season =

Morecambe
2019–20 season
- Co-chairmen: Graham Howse & Rod Taylor
- Managers: Jim Bentley (up to 28 October 2019); Derek Adams (from 7 November 2019) (Note: Kevin Ellison and Barry Roche served as joint caretaker player managers in the intervening period, and also took charge of the FA Cup tie at Blackpool on 9 November 2019.)
- Stadium: Globe Arena
- League Two: 22nd
- FA Cup: First round
- EFL Cup: Second round
- EFL Trophy: Group Stage (3rd)
- Top goalscorer: League: Cole Stockton (5); Lewis Alessandra (5); All: Cole Stockton (6)
- Highest home attendance: 3,899 v Bradford City; 12 October 2019
- Lowest home attendance: 514 v Wolverhampton Wanderers U23; 1 October 2019
- Average home league attendance: 2,264
- Biggest win: Morecambe 3–1 Carlisle United; 12 November 2019; Walsall 0–2 Morecambe; 28 January 2020; Morecambe 2–0 Macclesfield Town; 11 February 2020
- Biggest defeat: Crewe Alexandra 5–0 Morecambe; 23 November 2019
Home colours	Away colours
- All statistics correct as of match played 7 March 2020.

The 2019–20 season was Morecambe's 96th season since formation and their 13th consecutive season in League Two, the fourth tier of English football. They finished 22nd in League Two, and also competed in the FA Cup, EFL Cup and EFL Trophy, where they were eliminated in the first round, second round and group stage respectively.

== Pre-season ==
The Shrimps have announced they will face FC United of Manchester, Bamber Bridge, Barrow, Everton U23s, Marine and Accrington Stanley as part of their pre-season preparations.

9 July 2019 Friendly	F.C. United of Manchester	3–0	Morecambe	Moston
19:45 BST	Myers 38'; Ennis 68'; Sharp 86'	Report		Stadium: Broadhurst Park; Attendance: 536; Referee: Leigh Edmunds

13 July 2019 Friendly	Bamber Bridge	0–2	Morecambe	Bamber Bridge
15:00 BST		Report	Stockton 26', 53'	Stadium: Sir Tom Finney Stadium; Attendance: 360; Referee: Dean Watson

16 July 2019 Friendly	Barrow	2–0	Morecambe	Barrow-in-Furness
19:45 BST	Roche 61' (o.g.); Kay 84'	Report		Stadium: Progression Solicitors Stadium; Attendance: 704; Referee: Marc Edwards

20 July 2019 Friendly	Everton U23	1–3	Morecambe	Halewood
15:00 BST	Mampala	Report	Cranston; Oates	Stadium: USM Finch Farm; Attendance: 0

25 July 2019 Friendly	Marine	0–4	Morecambe	Crosby
19:30 BST		Report	Alessandra 35'; O'Sullivan 83' (pen.); Jagne 88'; Ellison 90'	Stadium: Marine Travel Arena; Attendance: 213; Referee: Ben Atkinson

27 July 2019 Friendly	Accrington Stanley	2–0	Morecambe	Leyland
15:00 BST	Bishop 57'; McConville 64'	Report		Stadium: County Ground; Attendance: 448; Referee: Jeremy Simpson

== Competitions ==
=== League Two ===
==== League table ====
Pos	Team	Pld	W	D	L	GF	GA	GD	Pts	PPG	Promotion, qualification or relegation
17	Leyton Orient	36	10	12	14	47	55	−8	42	1.17	
18	Carlisle United	37	10	12	15	39	56	−17	42	1.14	
19	Oldham Athletic	37	9	14	14	44	57	−13	41	1.11	
20	Scunthorpe United	37	10	10	17	44	56	−12	40	1.08	
21	Mansfield Town	36	9	11	16	48	55	−7	38	1.06	
22	Morecambe	37	7	11	19	35	60	−25	32	0.86	
23	Stevenage	36	3	13	20	24	50	−26	22	0.61	Reprieved from relegation (Note: As a result of Bury's expulsion from League One, only one team is relegated to maintain League Two at 24 teams.)
24	Macclesfield Town (R)	37	7	15	15	32	47	−15	19 (Note: Macclesfield Town were deducted a total of 17 points for various infractions. They were deducted six points for failing to both pay their players' wages and to fulfil a fixture, reduced to four points after appeal. A further seven-point deduction was given for failing to play December's match against Plymouth Argyle. A further two-point deduction was given for breaches of regulations over non-payment of wages. On 3 July the EFL appealed against the independent disciplinary panel's sanctions, and a further four points were deducted on 11 August 2020, resulting in Macclesfield Town being relegated.)	0.51	Relegation to the National League

Source: EFL Official Website
Rules for classification: 1) Points per game; 2) Goal difference; 3) Number of goals scored; 4) Head-to-head results; 5) Wins; 6) Away goals; 7) Penalty points (sec 9.5); 8) 12-point sending off offences
(R) Relegated

==== Results summary ====
Overall								Home						Away					
Pld	W	D	L	GF	GA	GD	Pts	W	D	L	GF	GA	GD	W	D	L	GF	GA	GD
37	7	11	19	35	60	−25	32	4	8	6	20	23	−3	3	3	13	15	37	−22

Last updated: 7 March 2020.
Source: BBC

==== Results by matchday ====
Matchday	1	2	3	4	5	6	7	8	9	10	11	12	13	14	15	16	17	18	19	20	21	22	23	24	25	26	27	28	29	30	31	32	33	34	35	36	37	38	39	40	41	42	43	44	45	46
Ground	H	A	H	A	H	A	H	A	H	A	H	A	H	A	H	A	H	A	A	H	A	H	H	A	A	H	H	A	H	A	A	H	H	A	A	H	A	H	A	H	A	H	A	H	A	H
Result	L	D	D	W	L	L	D	L	L	L	D	L	L	W	L	L	W	D	L	D	L	W	L	L	L	D	W	L	D	W	L	D	W	L	D	D	L	V	V	V	V	V	V	V	V	V
Position	21	21	19	17	18	20	20	22	22	22	22	23	24	23	23	24	24	23	24	24	24	23	23	23	23	23	23	24	23	23	23	23	22	22	22	22	22	22	22	22	22	22	22	22	22	22

Updated to match(es) played on 7 March 2020. Source: Statto.com
A = Away; H = Home; W = Win; D = Draw; L = Loss; V = Void

==== Matches ====
On Thursday, 20 June 2019, the EFL League Two fixtures were revealed.

3 August 2019 1	Morecambe	0–2	Grimsby Town	Morecambe
15:00 BST	Old (yellow card) 56'; Kenyon (yellow card) 59'; Alessandra (yellow card) 73'	Report	Green (yellow card) 58'; Whitehouse 68'; Clifton (yellow card) 74'; Wright 90+7'	Stadium: Globe Arena; Attendance: 2,872; Referee: Darren Handley

10 August 2019 2	Mansfield Town	2–2	Morecambe	Mansfield
15:00 BST	Preston (yellow card) 36' (red card) 82'; Maynard 39'; Rose 72'; Cook (yellow card) 90+3'	Report	Lavelle 4'; Alessandra 21'; Tutte (yellow card) 28'; Buxton (yellow card) 50'	Stadium: One Call Stadium; Attendance: 4,465; Referee: Christopher Pollard

17 August 2019 3	Morecambe	0–0	Cheltenham Town	Morecambe
15:00 BST	Roche (yellow card) 79'	Report	Long (yellow card) 58'	Stadium: Globe Arena; Attendance: 1,692; Referee: David Rock

20 August 2019 4	Macclesfield Town	0–1	Morecambe	Macclesfield
19:45 BST	Welch-Hayes (yellow card) 58'; Vassell (yellow card) 82'	Report	Alessandra (yellow card) 52'; Sutton 65'; O'Sullivan (yellow card) 70'; Brewitt (yellow card) 85'	Stadium: Moss Rose; Attendance: 1,862; Referee: Paul Marsden

24 August 2019 5	Morecambe	2–3	Exeter City	Morecambe
15:00 BST	Alessandra 45+4', 63'; Lavelle (yellow card) 80' (yellow-red card) 90+1'	Report	Taylor 21'; Martin 25'; Law 85'	Stadium: Globe Arena; Attendance: 1,517; Referee: Tom Nield

31 August 2019 6	Swindon Town	3–1	Morecambe	Swindon
15:00 BST	Doyle 5', 21'; Yates 17'	Report	Alessandra 13'	Stadium: The Energy Check County Ground; Attendance: 6,877; Referee: Darren Drysdale

7 September 2019 7	Morecambe	2–2	Salford City	Morecambe
15:00 BST	Miller 48'; Alessandra 50'; Conlan (yellow card) 61'	Report	Lloyd 15', 66'	Stadium: Globe Arena; Attendance: 2,778; Referee: Josh Smith

14 September 2019 8	Scunthorpe United	3–0	Morecambe	Scunthorpe
15:00 BST	Brown (yellow card) 8'; Proctor 25'; van Veen 33'; Lund 41'	Report		Stadium: Sands Venue Stadium; Attendance: 3,017; Referee: Nick Kinseley

17 September 2019 9	Morecambe	0–1	Walsall	Morecambe
19:45 BST	Old (yellow card) 79'	Report	Sinclair 4'; Liddle (yellow card) 54'	Stadium: Globe Arena; Attendance: 1,616; Referee: James Oldham

21 September 2019 10	Oldham Athletic	3–1	Morecambe	Oldham
15:00 BST	Maouche 33'; Segbé Azankpo 51'; Smith 89'	Report	Miller 78'	Stadium: Boundary Park; Attendance: 3,305; Referee: Leigh Doughty

28 September 2019 11	Morecambe	2–2	Northampton Town	Morecambe
15:00 BST	Tanner (yellow card) 30'; Buxton 72'; Ellison 90+3' (yellow card) 90+3'	Report	Turnbull 21', 37' (yellow card) 86'; Goode (yellow card) 29'; Hoskins (yellow card) 79'	Stadium: Globe Arena; Attendance: 2,245; Referee: Martin Coy

5 October 2019 12	Port Vale	3–1	Morecambe	Burslem
15:00 BST	Joyce 49'; Pope 68', 90'; Crookes (yellow card) 73'	Report	O'Sullivan 18'; Cranston (red card) 32'; Brewitt (yellow card) 45+1'; Alessandra (yellow card) 48'; Lavelle (yellow card) 76'	Stadium: Vale Park; Attendance: 4,485; Referee: Charles Breakspear

12 October 2019 13	Morecambe	1–2	Bradford City	Morecambe
15:00 BST	Brewitt 90+4'	Report	Akpan 47'; Oteh 78'	Stadium: Globe Arena; Attendance: 3,899; Referee: Christopher Sarginson

19 October 2019 14	Colchester United	0–1	Morecambe	Colchester
15:00 BST	Nouble (yellow card) 85'; Jackson (yellow card) 90+6'	Report	Brewitt (yellow card) 48'; Stockton 66'; Ellison (yellow card) 90+6'	Stadium: JobServe Community Stadium; Attendance: 3,011; Referee: Trevor Kettle

22 October 2019 15	Morecambe	0–2	Forest Green Rovers	Morecambe
19:45 BST	Alessandra (yellow card) 69' (yellow-red card) 90'	Report	Aitchison 75'; Shephard (yellow card) 87' (goal) 90+4'	Stadium: Globe Arena; Attendance: 1,658; Referee: Matt Donohue

26 October 2019 16	Stevenage	1–0	Morecambe	Stevenage
15:00 BST	Vancooten (yellow card) 69'; Cuthbert 82'; Watts (yellow card) 85'	Report	Brewitt (yellow card) 51'; Lavelle (yellow card) 87'	Stadium: The Lamex Stadium; Attendance: 2,288; Referee: Kevin Johnson

2 November 2019 17	Morecambe	1–0	Leyton Orient	Morecambe
15:00 GMT	Tutte (yellow card) 60'; Leitch-Smith 74'; Wildig (yellow card) 79'; Alessandra (yellow card) 90'	Report	Happe (yellow card) 61'	Stadium: Globe Arena; Attendance: 2,691; Referee: Paul Marsden

16 November 2019 18	Crawley Town	1–1	Morecambe	Crawley
15:00 GMT	Lubala 44' (pen.)	Report	Stockton (yellow card) 42' (goal) 81'; Conlan (yellow card) 72'	Stadium: The People's Pension Stadium; Attendance: 2,079; Referee: Antony Coggins

23 November 2019 19	Crewe Alexandra	5–0	Morecambe	Crewe
15:00 GMT	Finney 22', 90+1'; Lowery 31'; Kirk 38'; Wintle 58'	Report	Lavelle (red card) 34'	Stadium: Alexandra Stadium; Attendance: 4,149; Referee: Martin Coy

7 December 2019 20	Morecambe	1–1	Carlisle United	Morecambe
15:00 GMT	Alessandra (yellow card) 33'; O'Sullivan 50'; Conlan (yellow card) 57'	Report	Hope (yellow card) 29' (goal) 47'; Branthwaite (yellow card) 61'	Stadium: Globe Arena; Attendance: 3,126; Referee: Darren Handley

14 December 2019 21	Plymouth Argyle	3–0	Morecambe	Plymouth
15:00 GMT	J. Grant (yellow card) 19'; Cooper 44'; Sarcevic 45+2' (pen.); C. Grant 90+1'	Report	Brewitt (yellow card) 9'; Sutton (red card) 42'	Stadium: Home Park; Attendance: 9,174; Referee: Brett Huxtable

21 December 2019 22	Morecambe	2–1	Newport County	Morecambe
15:00 GMT	O'Sullivan (yellow card) 41' (goal) 80'; Stockton 68'	Report	Labadie 14'; McNamara (yellow card) 45+4'	Stadium: Globe Arena; Attendance: 2,161; Referee: Paul Marsden

26 December 2019 23	Morecambe	1–2	Oldham Athletic	Morecambe
15:00 GMT	Mendes Gomes 47'	Report	Segbé Azankpo 30'; Sylla 75'; McCann (yellow card) 90+6'	Stadium: Globe Arena; Attendance: 2,797; Referee: Anthony Backhouse

29 December 2019 24	Cambridge United	1–0	Morecambe	Cambridge
15:00 GMT	Roles 57'	Report	Kenyon (yellow card) 54'	Stadium: Abbey Stadium; Attendance: 4,086; Referee: Will Finnie

1 January 2020 25	Bradford City	1–0	Morecambe	Bradford
15:00 GMT	O'Connor (yellow card) 68'; Vaughan (yellow card) 72'; Oteh 80'	Report	Conlan (yellow card) 45+2'	Stadium: The Utilita Energy Stadium; Attendance: 14,111; Referee: Andy Haines

11 January 2020 26	Morecambe	1–1	Colchester United	Morecambe
15:00 GMT	Phillips 69'; Diagouraga (yellow card) 73'	Report	Clampin (yellow card) 21'; Nouble 35'; Poku (yellow card) 60'; Jackson (yellow card) 75' (yellow-red card) 83'; Pell (yellow card) 90'	Stadium: Globe Arena; Attendance: 1,593; Referee: Robert Lewis

14 January 2020 27	Morecambe	2–1	Port Vale	Morecambe
19:45 GMT	Old 6'; Stockton 12'; Kenyon (yellow card) 76'	Report	Legge (yellow card) 28'; Gibbons 71'	Stadium: Globe Arena; Attendance: 1,639; Referee: Marc Edwards

18 January 2020 28	Northampton Town	4–1	Morecambe	Sixfields
15:00 GMT	Anderson 28'; Watson 45+1'; Adams 55'; Lines 75'	Report	Phillips 64'	Stadium: The PTS Academy Stadium; Attendance: 4,761; Referee: Graham Salisbury

25 January 2020 29	Morecambe	1–1	Cambridge United	Morecambe
15:00 GMT	Phillips 46' (yellow card) 55'; Slew (yellow card) 59'; Cooney (yellow card) 90+2'	Report	Lewis (yellow card) 25'; Maris (yellow card) 36'; Knibbs 68'	Stadium: Globe Arena; Attendance: 2,019; Referee: Carl Boyeson

28 January 2020 30	Walsall	0–2	Morecambe	Walsall
19:45 GMT	Gordon (yellow card) 45'	Report	Slew (yellow card) 45'; Old 68'; Mendes Gomes (yellow card) 77' (goal) 90+6'; Mbulu (yellow card) 89'	Stadium: Banks's Stadium; Attendance: 3,554; Referee: Ross Joyce

1 February 2020 31	Cheltenham Town	2–1	Morecambe	Cheltenham
15:00 GMT	Thomas 32' (pen.); May 35'; Raglan (yellow card) 44'; Varney (yellow card) 64'; Broom (yellow card) 90+2'; Doyle-Hayes (yellow card) 90+6'	Report	Kenyon (yellow card) 71'; Leitch-Smith 84'; Wildig (yellow card) 87'; Stockton (yellow card) 90+8'	Stadium: Jonny-Rocks Stadium; Attendance: 3,044; Referee: David Rock

8 February 2020 32	Morecambe	1–1	Mansfield Town	Morecambe
15:00 GMT	Kenyon 85'	Report	Watts (yellow card) 49'; Riley 60'	Stadium: Globe Arena; Attendance: 1,965; Referee: Scott Oldham

11 February 2020 33	Morecambe	2–0	Macclesfield Town	Morecambe
19:45 GMT	Diagouraga 18'; Wildig 35'	Report		Stadium: Globe Arena; Attendance: 1,611; Referee: Michael Salisbury

15 February 2020 34	Grimsby Town	2–1	Morecambe	Cleethorpes
15:00 GMT	Hanson 69'; Benson 86'	Report	Phillips 90+2'	Stadium: Blundell Park; Attendance: 4,704; Referee: Trevor Kettle

22 February 2020 35	Carlisle United	2–2	Morecambe	Carlisle
15:00 GMT	Patrick 45'; Watt (yellow card) 51'; Anderton (yellow card) 59'; Hayden 65'; Webster (yellow card) 90+5'	Report	Stockton 18'; Wildig 24'; Cranston (yellow card) 85'	Stadium: Brunton Park; Attendance: 4,679; Referee: Peter Wright

29 February 2020 36	Morecambe	1–1	Crewe Alexandra	Morecambe
15:00 GMT	Wildig (yellow card) 55' (goal) 68'; Phillips (red card) 90+4'	Report	Ng 47'	Stadium: Globe Arena; Attendance: 2,872; Referee: Graham Salisbury

7 March 2020 37	Newport County	1–0	Morecambe	Newport
15:00 GMT	Gorman (yellow card) 26' (goal) 69'; Dolan (yellow card) 90+5'	Report	Slew (yellow card) 26'; Bradbury (yellow card) 90+7'	Stadium: Rodney Parade; Attendance: 3,048; Referee: Neil Hair

===== Coronavirus Suspension =====
On 13 March 2020, all professional football in England was suspended until at least 3 April 2020 due to the COVID-19 pandemic. Six days later, the suspension was extended to at least 30 April 2020. On 3 April 2020, the suspension was extended indefinitely.

On 11 May 2020, the Government released a document that stated that sport would not be able to resume before 1 June 2020 at the earliest, and only behind closed doors.

On 15 May 2020, the League Two clubs voted to end the season early, a decision that was ratified on 9 June.

This left Morecambe in 22nd place on 0.86 points per game, and safe to take their place in League Two for the 2020–21 season.

14 March 2020 38	Morecambe	Void	Plymouth Argyle	Morecambe
15:00 GMT				Stadium: Globe Arena

17 March 2020 39	Forest Green Rovers	Void	Morecambe	Nailsworth
19:45 GMT				Stadium: The New Lawn

21 March 2020 40	Morecambe	Void	Stevenage	Morecambe
15:00 GMT				Stadium: Globe Arena

28 March 2020 41	Leyton Orient	Void	Morecambe	Leyton
15:00 GMT				Stadium: The Breyer Group Stadium

4 April 2020 42	Morecambe	Void	Crawley Town	Morecambe
15:00 BST				Stadium: Globe Arena

10 April 2020 43	Exeter City	Void	Morecambe	Exeter
15:00 BST				Stadium: St James Park

13 April 2020 44	Morecambe	Void	Swindon Town	Morecambe
15:00 BST				Stadium: Globe Arena

18 April 2020 45	Salford City	Void	Morecambe	Salford
15:00 BST				Stadium: The Peninsula Stadium

25 April 2020 46	Morecambe	Void	Scunthorpe United	Morecambe
15:00 BST				Stadium: Globe Arena

=== FA Cup ===
The draw for the first round proper was made on 21 October 2019 by Karen Carney (home teams) and Jermaine Beckford (away teams).

9 November 2019 First round	Blackpool	4–1	Morecambe	Blackpool
15:00 GMT	Delfouneso 9'; Gnanduillet 24'; Virtue-Thick 45'; Kaikai 84'	Report	O'Sullivan (yellow card) 27'; Conlan (yellow card) 35'; Stockton 45+2'; Tanner (yellow card) 49'; Wildig (yellow card) 53'	Stadium: Bloomfield Road; Attendance: 5,371; Referee: Ross Joyce

=== EFL Cup ===
The first round draw was made on 20 June. The second round draw was made on 13 August 2019 following the conclusion of all but one first-round matches.

13 August 2019 First round	Mansfield Town	2–2 (5–6 p)	Morecambe	Mansfield
19:45 BST	Smith (yellow card) 5'; Pearce 57'; Sterling-James 68'; Rose (yellow card) 81'	Report	Oates (yellow card) 7'; Old 18', 59'; Conlan (red card) 22'; Tanner (yellow card) 32'; Halstead (yellow card) 79'	Stadium: One Call Stadium; Attendance: 1,884; Referee: Robert Lewis
	Penalties
	Khan (penalty missed); Sterling-James (penalty missed); Benning (penalty scored); Rose (penalty scored); Pearce (penalty scored); Tomlinson (penalty scored); Smith (penalty scored); Sweeney (penalty missed)		(penalty missed) Miller; (penalty scored) Cranston; (penalty scored) O'Sullivan; (penalty missed) Lavelle; (penalty scored) Buxton; (penalty scored) Kenyon; (penalty scored) Brewitt; (penalty scored) Old
Note: Morecambe went first in the shootout.

27 August 2019 Second round	Burton Albion	4–0	Morecambe	Burton upon Trent
19:45 BST	Daniel (yellow card) 19'; Boyce 34', 45+2', 74'; Edwards 51'	Report	Brewitt (yellow card) 58'	Stadium: Pirelli Stadium; Attendance: 1,500; Referee: Seb Stockbridge

=== EFL Trophy ===
On 9 July 2019, the pre-determined group stage draw was announced with Invited clubs to be drawn on 12 July 2019.

Pos	Div	Team	Pld	W	PW	PL	L	GF	GA	GD	Pts	Qualification
1	L1	Blackpool	3	2	0	0	1	7	3	+4	6	Advance to Round 2
2	ACA	Wolverhampton Wanderers U21	3	1	1	0	1	6	5	+1	5	Advance to Round 2
3	L2	Morecambe	3	1	0	1	1	6	8	−2	4	
4	L2	Carlisle United	3	1	0	0	2	5	8	−3	3	

Source: EFL.com

3 September 2019 Group Stage	Blackpool	5–1	Morecambe	Blackpool
19:30 BST	Heneghan 4'; Nottingham 45+1'; Hardie 51'; Kaikai 89'; Nuttall 90+1'	Report	Ellison 22'; Sutton (yellow card) 84'	Stadium: Bloomfield Road; Attendance: 2,319; Referee: Marc Edwards

1 October 2019 Group Stage	Morecambe	2–2 (4–5 p)	Wolverhampton Wanderers U23	Morecambe
19:45 BST	Brewitt 25'; Buxton (yellow card) 62'; Oates (yellow card) 77'; Howard 81'	Report	Watt 23'; Samuels 29'; Taylor (yellow card) 37'; Buur (yellow card) 68'	Stadium: Globe Arena; Attendance: 514; Referee: Ross Joyce
	Penalties
	Cranston (penalty scored); Buxton (penalty scored); O'Sullivan (penalty scored); Old (penalty scored); Howard (penalty missed); Mendes Gomes (penalty missed)		Watt (penalty missed); Perry (penalty scored); Sanderson (penalty scored); Dai Wai-tsun (penalty scored); Samuels (penalty scored) (penalty scored)

12 November 2019 Group Stage	Morecambe	3–1	Carlisle United	Morecambe
19:45 GMT	Tutte 61' (pen.); Wildig 67'; Conlan 90+1'	Report	Branthwaite 26'	Stadium: Globe Arena; Attendance: 802; Referee: Graham Salisbury

== Transfers ==
=== Transfers in ===
Date	Position	Nationality	Name	From	Fee	Ref.
1 July 2019	CB	ENG	Tom Brewitt	(England) AFC Fylde	Free transfer	
1 July 2019	RB	ENG	Adam Buxton	(England) Tranmere Rovers	Free transfer	
1 July 2019	CF	ENG	Michael Howard	(England) Preston North End	Free transfer	
1 July 2019	CF	ENG	Cole Stockton	(England) Tranmere Rovers	Free transfer	
2 July 2019	RM	IRL	John O'Sullivan	(England) Blackpool	Free transfer	
25 July 2019	RW	ENG	Lewis Alessandra	(England) Notts County	Free transfer	
25 July 2019	AM	ENG	Joe Lynch	(England) Crewe Alexandra	Free transfer	
2 January 2020	DM	FRA	Toumani Diagouraga	(England) Swindon Town	Free transfer	
2 January 2020	CF	ENG	Jordan Slew	(England) Ashton United	Free transfer	
24 January 2020	CB	ENG	Christian Mbulu	(England) Crewe Alexandra	Free transfer	

=== Loans in ===
Date	Position	Nationality	Name	From	Date until	Ref.
24 July 2019	CF	ENG	Shaun Miller	(England) Crewe Alexandra	30 June 2020	
12 August 2019	RB	ENG	George Tanner	(England) Manchester United	24 January 2020	
2 January 2020	RB	ENG	Ryan Cooney	(England) Burnley	30 June 2020	
2 January 2020	DM	ENG	Adam Phillips	(England) Burnley	30 June 2020	
15 January 2020	GK	CGO	Christoffer Mafoumbi	(England) Blackpool	30 June 2020	
31 January 2020	CF	ENG	Harvey Bradbury	(England) Millwall	30 June 2020	

=== Loans out ===
Date	Position	Nationality	Name	To	Date until	Ref.
30 December 2019	DM	ENG	Tyler Brownsword	(England) Colne	30 January 2020	
11 January 2020	CF	ENG	Kyle Hawley	(England) FC United of Manchester	February 2020	
14 February 2020	CF	ENG	Michael Howard	(England) Marine	30 June 2020	
3 March 2020	RB	ENG	Adam Buxton	(England) York City	30 June 2020	

=== Transfers out ===
Date	Position	Nationality	Name	To	Fee	Ref.
1 July 2019	SS	ENG	Adam Campbell	(England) Darlington	Released	
1 July 2019	RW	WAL	Aaron Collins	(England) Forest Green Rovers	Free transfer	
1 July 2019	CM	ENG	Ben Hedley	(England) Bradford (Park Avenue)	Released	
1 July 2019	RB	ENG	Zak Mills	(England) Oldham Athletic	Free transfer	
1 July 2019	CF	ENG	Vadaine Oliver	(England) Northampton Town	Released	
1 July 2019	RB	ENG	James Sinclair	(Sweden) Oskarshamn	Released	
1 July 2019	GK	POL	Dawid Szczepaniak	(Wales) Wrexham	Released	
5 July 2019	FW	ENG	Kai Herbert	(England) Huddersfield Town	Undisclosed	
10 January 2020	AM	ENG	Joe Lynch	Free agent	Mutual consent	
23 January 2020	RW	ENG	Lewis Alessandra	(England) Carlisle United	Mutual consent	
