= Brownsword =

Brownsword is a surname. Notable people with the surname include:

- Andrew Brownsword (born 1947), English businessman
- Jack Brownsword (1923–2009), English footballer
- Tyler Brownsword (born 1999), English footballer
