= Freddie Price =

English footballer

Personal information
- Full name: Freddie Connor Burrows Price
- Date of birth: 12 May 2002 (age 24)
- Place of birth: Stafford, England
- Height: 1.81 m (5 ft 11 in)
- Position: Midfielder

Team information
- Current team: Marine

Youth career
- –2020: Morecambe

Senior career*
| Years | Team | Apps | (Gls) |
| 2020–2022 | Morecambe | 14 | (1) |
| 2022– | Marine | 4 | (0) |
- * Club domestic league appearances and goals as of 08:24, 2 February 2023 (UTC)

Freddie Connor Burrows Price (born 12 May 2002) is an English footballer who plays as a midfielder for Marine.

== Career ==
Having come through the youth system at Morecambe, Price made his senior debut for the club on 8 September 2020 as a substitute in a 2–1 EFL Trophy defeat to Rochdale. Price made his league debut on 27 October, again as a substitute in a 3–1 defeat to Carlisle United. On 18 November 2020, Price scored a first senior goal with the fourth in a 4–0 thrashing of Manchester United U21s. Following Morecambe's promotion to League One, a one-year contract extension was activated for Price by new manager Stephen Robinson.

Price was released by the club at the end of the 2021–22 season. He signed for Marine in October 2022.

== Career statistics ==
=== Club ===
As of match played 2 April 2021

Appearances and goals by club, season and competition
| Club | Season | League | | | National Cup | | League Cup | | Other | | Total | |
| Club | Season | Division | Apps | Goals | Apps | Goals | Apps | Goals | Apps | Goals | Apps | Goals |
|---|---|---|---|---|---|---|---|---|---|---|---|---|
| Morecambe | 2020–21 | League Two | 11 | 1 | 0 | 0 | 0 | 0 | 3 (Note: Appearance(s) in the Football League Trophy) | 1 | 14 | 2 |
| Morecambe | 2021–22 | League One | 3 | 0 | 0 | 0 | 0 | 0 | 2 | 0 | 5 | 0 |
| Morecambe | Career total | | 14 | 1 | 0 | 0 | 0 | 0 | 5 | 1 | 19 | 2 |
