= John O'Sullivan (footballer, born 1993) =

Irish footballer (born 1993)

Personal information
- Full name: John Anthony James O'Sullivan
- Date of birth: 18 September 1993 (age 33)
- Place of birth: Dublin, Ireland
- Height: 5 ft 11 in (1.81 m)
- Position: Midfielder

Youth career
- –2009: Belvedere
- 2009–2013: Blackburn Rovers

Senior career*
Years	Team	Apps	(Gls)
2013–2017	Blackburn Rovers	6	(0)
2014	→ Southport (loan)	21	(5)
2014	→ Accrington Stanley (loan)	13	(4)
2015	→ Barnsley (loan)	8	(0)
2015–2016	→ Rochdale (loan)	3	(0)
2016	→ Bury (loan)	19	(0)
2016–2017	→ Accrington Stanley (loan)	19	(3)
2017–2018	Carlisle United	35	(4)
2018–2019	Blackpool	13	(0)
2019	→ Dundee (loan)	11	(0)
2019–2021	Morecambe	72	(7)
2021–2022	Accrington Stanley	25	(2)
2022–2023	Bohemians	27	(2)
2024–2025	Shelbourne	36	(1)
Total		308	(28)

International career
2011–2012	Republic of Ireland U19	13	(1)
2012–2013	Republic of Ireland U21	4	(0)
- * Club domestic league appearances and goals

John Anthony James O'Sullivan (born 18 September 1993) is a retired Irish professional footballer who played as a midfielder.

== Club career ==
In the summer of 2009, O'Sullivan, aged 15, joined Premier League side Blackburn Rovers from Dublin-based Belvedere, a youth club that's well known for its youth system which has successfully produced dozens of players who have gone on to play football throughout the United Kingdom and Ireland.

Working his way through the ranks at Rovers, from the academy to the Reserves, O'Sullivan begun to be featured in match day squads as an unused substitute during the 2012–13 Football League Championship campaign, the club's first season return in the second tier of English football having been relegated from the Premier League in May 2012.

On 4 May 2013, O'Sullivan made his senior professional debut for Rovers in their final game of the season, coming on as a second-half substitute against Birmingham City.

On 9 January 2014, O'Sullivan joined Conference Premier side Southport on a one-month loan deal. On 2 February, the loan was extended until the end of the season. He scored his first goal for Southport on 22 February 2014 in a 3–1 away defeat against Forest Green Rovers.

On 19 September 2014, O'Sullivan joined League Two outfit Accrington Stanley on a one-month loan deal. On 20 October 2014, the loan was extended until 20 December 2014. O'Sullivan scored 4 goals in 13 appearances.

He joined League One club Barnsley on a one-month loan deal on 19 February 2015, and made 8 appearances on loan at the club.

On 26 November 2015, O'Sullivan joined Rochdale on loan until 3 January. He made 3 appearances while on loan at Rochdale, including being shown a straight red card in the 12th minute of his final game for the club, a 2–1 defeat to Swindon Town on 12 December. On 15 January 2016, he joined Bury on a 28-day loan. He made his debut for the club the following day as a 37th-minute substitute in a 3–2 defeat at home to Walsall. His loan was extended until the end of the season on 1 February, having already made three appearances for the club. He made 19 appearances for Bury across his loan spell at the club.

On 8 August 2016, he returned to Accrington Stanley on a six-month loan deal. He scored once in 25 matches across all competitions during this loan.

In January 2017, it was announced that O'Sullivan and Blackburn Rovers had agreed to mutually terminate the player's contract, ending his eight-year association with the Lancashire outfit. In total, O'Sullivan made six first-team appearances for Rovers, having spent a majority of his last three-years with the club out on-loan at Southport, Accrington Stanley, Barnsley, Rochdale and Bury.

In the same month, following his release from Blackburn Rovers, O'Sullivan signed for League Two side Carlisle United on an 18-month-deal. He was released by Carlisle at the end of the 2017–18 season, having made 35 league appearances for the Cumbrian club, finding the net on two occasions.

In June 2018, O'Sullivan linked up once again with former Rovers academy and first-team manager Gary Bowyer at League One Blackpool, signing a one-year deal with the Tangerines.

On 4 September, O'Sullivan scored his first goal for Blackpool in a 3–3 draw against Macclesfield Town in the EFL Trophy.

In late January 2019, O'Sullivan, joined Scottish Premiership club Dundee on loan until the end-of-the-season. He left Blackpool at the end of the season, following the expiration of his contract with the Seasiders. Blackpool had opted against activating the clause in O'Sullivan's contract to extend his stay by a further year.

On 2 July 2019, O'Sullivan joined League Two outfit Morecambe, agreeing to a two-year deal with the side.

On 17 June 2021, it was announced that O'Sullivan had agreed to join League One side Accrington Stanley on a three-year deal upon the expiration of his contract with newly promoted Morecambe, having turned down an offer from Morecambe to join rivals Stanley. It meant that the move was to be the first time O'Sullivan had linked up with Stanley on a permanent basis, having previously had two loan-spells with the club.

On 10 June 2022, John returned home to Dublin to sign for League of Ireland Premier Division side Bohemians.

On 8 December 2023, O'Sullivan would join Bohemian's rivals Shelbourne for the 2024 season. O'Sullivan would win the League of Ireland Premier Division with the Shels at the end of the 2024 season. On 22 December 2025, it was announced that he had departed the club.

== International career ==
O'Sullivan made his debut for the Ireland national under 15 team in 2008, he won international u16 player of the year. He has been called up at all age groups to the Republic of Ireland U21s. In 2011, he featured in all the games for Ireland u19 team that reached the semi-final of the euro finals.

== Career statistics ==
As of match played 23 July 2025

Appearances and goals by club, season and competition
Club	Season	League			National Cup		League Cup		Other		Total	
Club	Season	Division	Apps	Goals	Apps	Goals	Apps	Goals	Apps	Goals	Apps	Goals
Blackburn Rovers	2012–13	Championship	1	0	0	0	0	0	0	0	1	0
Blackburn Rovers	2013–14	Championship	0	0	0	0	0	0	0	0	0	0
Blackburn Rovers	2014–15	Championship	2	0	0	0	0	0	0	0	2	0
Blackburn Rovers	2015–16	Championship	2	0	0	0	1	0	0	0	3	0
Blackburn Rovers	Total		5	0	0	0	1	0	0	0	6	0
Southport (loan)	2013–14	Conference Premier	21	3	0	0	–		0	0	21	3
Accrington Stanley (loan)	2014–15	League Two	13	4	0	0	0	0	0	0	13	4
Barnsley (loan)	2014–15	League One	8	0	0	0	0	0	0	0	8	0
Rochdale (loan)	2015–16	League One	2	0	1	0	0	0	0	0	3	0
Bury (loan)	2015–16	League One	19	0	0	0	0	0	0	0	19	0
Accrington Stanley (loan)	2016–17	League Two	19	1	2	1	3	0	1 (Note: Appearance(s) in EFL Trophy)	0	25	2
Carlisle United	2016–17	League Two	17	1	0	0	0	0	2 (Note: Appearances in League Two play-offs)	2	19	3
Carlisle United	2017–18	League Two	18	1	4	0	0	0	1	0	23	1
Carlisle United	Total		35	2	4	0	0	0	3	2	42	4
Blackpool	2018–19	League One	13	0	2	0	4	0	3	1	22	1
Dundee	2018–19	Scottish Premiership	11	0	0	0	0	0	0	0	11	0
Morecambe	2019–20	League Two	34	3	1	0	1	0	3	0	39	3
Morecambe	2020–21	League Two	38	4	3	1	3	0	3 (Note: Appearances in the Football League Trophy and the League Two play-offs)	0	47	5
Morecambe	Total		72	7	4	1	4	0	6	0	86	8
Accrington Stanley	2021–22	League One	24	2	1	0	0	0	1	1	26	3
Bohemians	2022	LOI Premier Division	8	1	3	0	–		–		11	1
Bohemians	2023	LOI Premier Division	19	1	5	0	–		2 (Note: Appearance(s) in the Leinster Senior Cup)	1	26	2
Bohemians	Total		27	2	8	0	–		2	1	37	3
Shelbourne	2024	LOI Premier Division	24	1	2	0	–		3 (Note: Appearance(s) in UEFA Conference League)	0	29	1
Shelbourne	2025	LOI Premier Division	12	0	1	0	–		1 (Note: Appearance(s) in UEFA Champions League)	0	14	0
Shelbourne	Total		36	1	3	0	–		4	0	43	1
Career total			305	22	25	2	12	0	20	5	362	29

== Honours ==
Morecambe

- EFL League Two play-offs: 2021

Bohemians

- Leinster Senior Cup: 2022–23

Shelbourne

- League of Ireland Premier Division: 2024
- President of Ireland's Cup: 2025
