= Jordan Slew =

British footballer (born 1992)

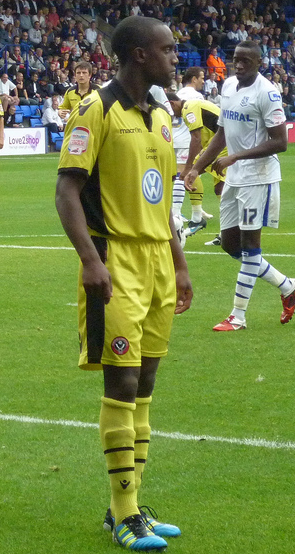
- Slew playing for Sheffield United in 2012.

Personal information
- Full name: Jordan Michael Slew
- Date of birth: 7 September 1992 (age 34)
- Place of birth: Gleadless, England
- Height: 6 ft 3 in (1.91 m)
- Position: Striker

Team information
- Current team: Southport

Youth career
- 2006–2010: Sheffield United

Senior career*
Years	Team	Apps	(Gls)
2010–2011	Sheffield United	11	(3)
2011–2015	Blackburn Rovers	1	(0)
2012	→ Stevenage (loan)	9	(0)
2012	→ Oldham Athletic (loan)	3	(0)
2013	→ Rotherham United (loan)	7	(0)
2014	→ Ross County (loan)	20	(1)
2014	→ Port Vale (loan)	9	(2)
2015–2016	Cambridge United	23	(1)
2016	Chesterfield	7	(0)
2016–2017	Plymouth Argyle	32	(4)
2017–2018	Rochdale	5	(0)
2018	Radcliffe Borough	2	(0)
2018–2019	Boston United	13	(2)
2019–2020	Ashton United	6	(2)
2020–2021	Morecambe	28	(1)
2021–2023	FC Halifax Town	56	(12)
2023–2025	Morecambe	75	(9)
2025–	Southport	41	(10)

International career
2011	England U19	2	(0)
- * Club domestic league appearances and goals as of 18:44, 1 May 2026 (UTC)

Jordan Michael Slew (born 7 September 1992) is an English professional footballer who plays as a striker for National League North club Southport.

Born in Sheffield, Slew began his footballing career at Sheffield United's academy in 2006, joining the club at the age of 11. After making his first-team debut in 2010, he attracted the interest of several clubs, including Blackburn Rovers, for whom he signed in September 2011 for a £1.1 million fee. Slew also made two appearances for the England U19s in 2011. He subsequently spent time on loan at Stevenage, Oldham Athletic, Rotherham United, Ross County, and Port Vale. He joined Cambridge United in February 2015 and stayed with the club for 12 months. He signed with Chesterfield in February 2016 and then joined Plymouth Argyle four months later. He helped Plymouth to win promotion out of EFL League Two in 2016–17. He joined Rochdale in September 2017 before dropping into non-League football with Radcliffe four months later. He joined Boston United in October 2018 and moved to Ashton United 12 months later. He returned to the EFL with Morecambe in January 2020, dropping back into the National League with FC Halifax Town in August 2021. He rejoined Morecambe for a two-year stay beginning in July 2023. He signed with Southport in July 2025.

== Club career ==
=== Sheffield United ===
Having started his career as a youngster with the Sheffield United academy, Slew made his first-team debut at the start of October 2010, coming on as an 86th-minute substitute in a 1–0 home defeat to Watford. He then signed his first senior professional contract with Sheffield United at the start of November, a deal designed to tie him to the club until the summer of 2012. After two further late-substitute appearances, he made his first start for Sheffield United in April 2011, playing the whole game and scoring in a 3–1 defeat to Preston North End at Deepdale. He made eight appearances in total for the club during the 2010–11 campaign, scoring twice. As well as his breakthrough into the first-team, Slew also played an instrumental part in Sheffield United's run in the 2010–11 FA Youth Cup, where they reached the final before losing to Manchester United's Academy side over two legs. Slew scored three goals during the cup run, including a goal in the first leg of the final.

By May 2011, several Premier League and Championship teams had enquired about acquiring Slew's services, with United turning down a £500,000 offer from Fulham. Shortly after, Slew agreed an improved two-year deal to keep him at Bramall Lane until 2014. He began the 2011–12 season as a first-team regular, playing in all of United's games during that August, scoring once.

=== Blackburn Rovers ===
Despite having only recently signed an extended deal with Sheffield United, Slew signed for Premier League side Blackburn Rovers on August transfer deadline day 2011. Blackburn paid a fee of £1.1 million for the player, with Slew signing a four-year contract. Arriving as a squad player, Slew had to wait until December 2011 to make his debut for Blackburn, coming on as an 89th-minute substitute against Manchester United at Old Trafford. Unable to achieve a regular place in the Blackburn first-team, Slew joined League One side Stevenage on loan in March 2012, agreeing a deal to run until the end of the 2011–12 season. He made his debut for Stevenage a day after joining the club, playing in a 1–1 away draw against Exeter City. During his fifth appearance for Stevenage, Slew received a straight red card for "inexplicably raising his arms" to Colchester United midfielder Anthony Wordsworth. Slew returned to Ewood Park having played nine games for Stevenage, but failed to score a goal.

With Blackburn now in the Championship, Slew was still unable to make the break into the first-team and was instead loaned to League One side Oldham Athletic for six months in August 2012. Slew scored on his Oldham debut, netting in a 2–4 League Cup loss to Sheffield Wednesday a week after signing. After only four appearances for his temporary club, Slew suffered a stress fracture to his back and was sidelined for over three months, returning to Blackburn Rovers for treatment, and effectively ending his loan spell. Having recovered from his injury, Slew signed a six-week loan deal with League Two side Rotherham United at the end of January 2013. Slew's first appearance for Rotherham came just two days later, in a 3–1 win against promotion rivals Northampton Town, and he played regularly for the duration of his loan spell, making seven appearances in total. Despite Rotherham hoping to retain Slew's services until the end of the season, they were unable to agree a deal with Blackburn Rovers, and Slew returned to Ewood Park once more.

The following season, Slew failed to make a first-team appearance for Blackburn and on 1 January 2014, he joined Scottish Premiership side Ross County on loan until the end of the season. He made his debut that same day in the Highland derby with Inverness Caledonian Thistle at Caledonian Stadium, helping Derek Adams's "Staggies" to a 2–1 win. He went on to make 20 appearances during his time at Victoria Park and scored one goal in his final appearance, a 3–2 win over Partick Thistle on 10 May.

After being transfer-listed at Blackburn, Slew agreed on a loan move to Port Vale in the summer of 2014. However, manager Micky Adams stated it was "a frustrating chase" as Rovers manager Gary Bowyer refused to sanction the loan agreement until he was sure that a permanent offer would not be made for the player. A loan deal lasting until January 2015 was eventually agreed on 29 August, and Slew scored his first goal for the Valiants on 6 September, netting a late consolation goal in a 3–1 defeat at Peterborough United. On 4 October he was sent off in a 1–0 defeat at Fleetwood Town after striking an opposition player. He failed to win back his first-team spot after returning from suspension and his loan deal was not extended by manager Rob Page. He had his contract with Blackburn terminated by mutual consent in January 2015.

=== Cambridge United ===
In February 2015, Slew signed an 18-month contract with League Two side Cambridge United. He scored one goal in 13 games in the second half of the 2014–15 season and was transfer listed in May by manager Richard Money after Slew admitted he was playing "nowhere near his best". He failed to score in 12 appearances during the 2015–16 season and his contract with the club was cancelled by mutual consent on 1 February.

=== Chesterfield ===
Slew joined League One side Chesterfield on a short-term deal in February 2016, after manager Danny Wilson needed cover for injured strikers Sylvan Ebanks-Blake and Lee Novak. He was released at the end of the 2015–16 season, having made just seven substitute appearances for the club.

=== Plymouth Argyle ===
In July 2016, Slew signed a one-year contract with League Two club Plymouth Argyle. He scored his first goal for Plymouth in a 4–1 win over Newport County in an EFL Trophy match on 30 August 2016. He went on to score six goals in 40 appearances across the 2016–17 campaign as the "Pilgrims" secured promotion with a second-place finish; despite this, however, he was released in May 2017.

=== Rochdale ===
On 12 September 2017, Slew joined League One club Rochdale on a short-term deal after spending what he called "a rough couple of months" without a club. He made his debut later the same day as a second-half substitute in a 2–1 victory over Doncaster Rovers at Spotland Stadium. Slew left Rochdale in January 2018 when his contract expired.

=== Non-League ===
Slew joined Northern Premier League Division One North club Radcliffe Borough in January 2018. He made his "Boro" debut in a 1–1 draw with Atherton Collieries on 5 February. Radcliffe finished the 2017–18 season in 20th-place under the stewardship of Jon Macken. After a break from the game, Slew joined Boston United of the National League North in October 2018, making his debut for the club in a 4–0 win over Blyth Spartans at York Street the following day. He scored two goals in 13 league appearances, before being released at the end of the 2018–19 season. On 1 October 2019, he joined Ashton United of the Northern Premier League Premier Division.

=== Morecambe ===
On 2 January 2020, Slew secured a return to the English Football League after signing for League Two side Morecambe; he was one of Derek Adams's first signings as "Shrimps" manager. He featured 11 times before the 2019–20 season was curtailed early due to the COVID-19 pandemic in England. He went on to agree to a new deal to keep him at the Globe Arena for another year. He scored one goal from 25 appearances in the 2020–21 season after fracturing his fibula in March and was forced to watch his teammates win the play-offs in his absence. He was released at the end of his contract.

=== Halifax Town ===
On 3 August 2021, Slew signed with FC Halifax Town in the National League. He scored his first goal for the club in a 2–0 win against Altrincham on 30 August. He scored 11 goals from 45 games in the 2021–22 campaign, finishing as the club's third-highest scorer after Billy Waters and Matty Warburton. Pete Wild's "Shaymen" qualified for the play-offs with a fourth-place finish, which Slew said was a "huge achievement". However, they were beaten 2–1 by Chesterfield in the play-off quarter-finals. He made just nine league starts in the 2022–23 season, with two goals in a total of twenty appearances. He was told he could find a new club in March, and his departure from the club was announced on 15 April.

=== Return to Morecambe ===
On 7 July 2023, he returned to Morecambe on a one-year deal; it was the fourth time Derek Adams signed him. He ended the 2023–24 season with eight goals in 51 games and was released upon the expiry of his contract. He was re-signed on a one-year deal, however, after the club had a transfer embargo lifted. He scored in both FA Cup victories that led to a third round tie against Premier League club Chelsea. However, Morecambe were relegated out of the Football League at the end of the 2024–25 season, which he described as a "major low". He was released upon the expiry of his contract.

=== Southport ===
On 26 July 2025, Slew joined National League North club Southport on a one-year deal. He scored ten goals in 41 league games throughout the 2025–26 season, two of which came in a 2–2 draw with Kidderminster Harriers and another brace came in a 5–1 win over Hereford. He was one of three players tied on 12 goals overall, along with Chris Sze and Arthur Gnahoua.

== International career ==
Slew made his international debut for the England U19 side in a 1–0 defeat to Germany on 8 February 2011, replacing Connor Wickham after 60 minutes. He earned his second cap against the Netherlands on 29 March 2011, coming on as a 72nd-minute substitute in a 3–0 defeat.

== Personal life ==
Born in Sheffield Slew is a lifelong supporter of his first club, Sheffield United. He enjoys classical music and when interviewed by radio station Classic FM, Slew described himself as "...like an old man in a young man's body!" After revealing this, he said he listened to the station while driving.

In March 2015, he was caught by police speeding at 156 miles per hour (251 km/h) in his BMW M4 on the Cambridgeshire section of the A1, in what was the fastest recorded speed on a public road in the UK for more than three years; he was banned from driving for six months and handed a £1,400 fine.

== Career statistics ==
As of match played 25 April 2026

Appearances and goals by club, season and competition
Club	Season	League			FA Cup		League Cup		Other		Total	
Club	Season	Division	Apps	Goals	Apps	Goals	Apps	Goals	Apps	Goals	Apps	Goals
Sheffield United	2010–11	Championship	7	2	1	0	0	0	—		8	2
Sheffield United	2011–12	League One	4	1	0	0	1	0	1 (Note: Appearances in Football League Trophy / EFL Trophy)	0	6	1
Sheffield United	Total		11	3	1	0	1	0	1	0	14	3
Blackburn Rovers	2011–12	Premier League	1	0	1	0	0	0	—		2	0
Blackburn Rovers	2012–13	Championship	0	0	0	0	0	0	—		0	0
Blackburn Rovers	2013–14	Championship	0	0	0	0	0	0	—		0	0
Blackburn Rovers	2014–15	Championship	0	0	0	0	0	0	—		0	0
Blackburn Rovers	Total		1	0	1	0	0	0	—		2	0
Stevenage (loan)	2011–12	League One	9	0	0	0	—		0	0	9	0
Oldham Athletic (loan)	2012–13	League One	3	0	0	0	1	1	0	0	4	1
Rotherham United (loan)	2012–13	League Two	7	0	—		—		—		7	0
Ross County (loan)	2013–14	Scottish Premiership	20	1	—		—		—		20	1
Port Vale (loan)	2014–15	League One	9	2	0	0	—		0	0	9	2
Cambridge United	2014–15	League Two	13	1	—		—		—		13	1
Cambridge United	2015–16	League Two	10	0	0	0	1	0	1	0	12	0
Cambridge United	Total		23	1	0	0	1	0	1	0	25	1
Chesterfield	2015–16	League One	7	0	—		—		—		7	0
Plymouth Argyle	2016–17	League Two	32	4	4	1	1	0	3	1	40	6
Rochdale	2017–18	League One	5	0	1	0	—		3	1	9	1
Radcliffe Borough	2017–18	Northern Premier League; Division One North	2	0	0	0	—		0	0	2	0
Boston United	2018–19	National League North	13	2	0	0	—		2 (Note: Appearances in FA Trophy)	0	15	2
Ashton United	2019–20	Northern Premier League; Premier Division	6	2	1	0	—		4 (Note: Two appearances in FA Trophy, one appearance in Northern Premier League Challenge Cup, one appearance in Manchester Premier Cup)	0	11	2
Morecambe	2019–20	League Two	11	0	—		—		—		11	0
Morecambe	2020–21	League Two	17	1	3	0	3	0	2	0	25	1
Morecambe	Total		28	1	3	0	3	0	2	0	36	1
FC Halifax Town	2021–22	National League	38	10	4	1	—		3 (Note: Two appearances in FA Trophy, one appearance in National League play-offs)	0	45	11
FC Halifax Town	2022–23	National League	18	2	1	0	—		1	0	20	2
FC Halifax Town	Total		56	12	5	1	—		4	0	65	13
Morecambe	2023–24	League Two	44	8	3	0	1	0	3	0	51	8
Morecambe	2024–25	League Two	31	1	3	2	1	0	4	0	39	3
Morecambe	Total		75	9	6	2	2	0	7	0	90	11
Southport	2025–26	National League North	41	10	0	0	—		1	0	42	10
Southport	2026–27	National League North	0	0	0	0	—		0	0	0	0
Southport	Total		41	10	0	0	0	0	1	0	42	10
Career total			348	47	22	4	9	1	28	2	407	54

== Honours ==
Plymouth Argyle

- EFL League Two second-place promotion: 2016–17
