= Ryan Cooney =

English footballer (born 2000)

Personal information
- Full name: Ryan Thomas Cooney
- Date of birth: 26 February 2000 (age 26)
- Place of birth: Manchester, England
- Height: 5 ft 10 in (1.79 m)
- Position: Right-back

Team information
- Current team: Glentoran
- Number: 2

Youth career
- –2016: Bury

Senior career*
Years	Team	Apps	(Gls)
2016–2019	Bury	21	(0)
2019–2021	Burnley	0	(0)
2020–2021	→ Morecambe (loan)	47	(0)
2021–2023	Morecambe	59	(0)
2023–2025	Crewe Alexandra	76	(3)
2025–	Glentoran	34	(3)
- * Club domestic league appearances and goals as of 29 April 2026

Ryan Thomas Cooney (born 26 February 2000) is an English professional footballer who plays as a defender for NIFL Premiership side Glentoran.

== Career ==
=== Bury ===
Cooney was born in Manchester. He joined Bury at the age of nine, progressing through the club's youth academy and being made captain of the youth team. Cooney was promoted to the first-team squad in the 2016–17 season while still a scholar because of injuries. He made his debut on 26 August 2017, playing against Rochdale in a League One match which ended 0–0. He signed a two-year professional contract with the club in October 2018. He made a total of 29 appearances in all competitions having been given the opportunity of first team football by manager Ryan Lowe. He got used to spending time around older, more experienced players and he adapted on and off the pitch. Despite gaining promotion from EFL League Two in the 2018–19 season, Bury's future looked bleak amid financial problems and Cooney was hoping for a move.

=== Burnley ===
Cooney signed for Premier League club Burnley on 15 July 2019 on a one-year contract with the option of a further year, initially joining the under-23 team. In the first half of the season he was a regular part of Steve Stone's side and contributed towards a 17-match unbeaten run. He became a part of Burnley's first-team bubble until the end of the 2019–20 season, along with a number of youngsters, following the return to football post-lockdown. He was rewarded with a new one-year contract in June 2020.

==== Morecambe (loan spells) ====
On 2 January 2020, he was sent out on loan for the first time when he joined League Two side Morecambe until the end of the season along with Adam Phillips. There was frustration in March 2020, as COVID-19 brought the loan to an abrupt halt as Cooney had been beginning to settle in and was playing and performing consistently. Cooney and Phillips spoke during the lockdown and agreed that they would return to Morecambe if the opportunity arose in the following season, describing manager Derek Adams as a big influence. On 11 August 2020, Cooney re-joined Morecambe on loan until the end of the season along with Phillips. Morecambe made a good start to the season and were top of the league after five games with four wins.

=== Morecambe ===
On 24 June 2021, it was announced that Cooney had signed for Morecambe on a free transfer on a two-year deal after turning down the offer of a new contract at Burnley. In May 2023, Cooney was one of 14 players released by Morecambe following their relegation to League Two.

=== Crewe Alexandra ===
On 23 June 2023, League Two side Crewe Alexandra announced the signing of Cooney on a two-year deal. He made his Crewe debut at Gresty Road on 5 August 2023, coming on as an 81st minute substitute for Zac Williams in a 2–2 draw with Mansfield Town. Cooney was sent off after a second yellow card in Crewe's 1–0 defeat at Port Vale in an EFL Trophy tie on 5 September 2023. He scored his first Crewe goal (a penalty) in a 5–1 defeat of Liverpool U21s in an EFL Trophy group game at Gresty Road on 27 August 2024. On 14 May 2025, the club announced Cooney would be leaving in June when his contract expired.

=== Glentoran ===
On 14 July 2025, Cooney joined Belfast-based NIFL Premiership side Glentoran on a two-year deal. He made his club debut in a 1–0 win at Portadown on 9 August 2025, and scored his first goal a week later, securing a 1–0 win over Bangor. On 3 January 2026, Cooney provided six assists, helping team-mate Pat Hoban score a double hat-trick in a 7–0 win over Carrick Rangers.

== Career statistics ==
As of match played 3 February 2026

Appearances and goals by club, season and competition
Club	Season	League			FA Cup		EFL Cup		Other		Total	
Club	Season	Division	Apps	Goals	Apps	Goals	Apps	Goals	Apps	Goals	Apps	Goals
Bury	2016–17	League One	0	0	0	0	0	0	0	0	0	0
Bury	2017–18	League One	12	0	0	0	0	0	2 (Note: Appearance(s) in EFL Trophy)	0	14	0
Bury	2018–19	League Two	9	0	0	0	0	0	6	0	15	0
Bury	Total		21	0	0	0	0	0	8	0	29	0
Burnley	2019–20	Premier League	0	0	0	0	0	0	—		0	0
Burnley	2020–21	Premier League	0	0	—		—		—		0	0
Burnley	Total		0	0	0	0	0	0	—		0	0
Morecambe (loan)	2019–20	League Two	11	0	—		—		—		11	0
Morecambe (loan)	2020–21	League Two	36	0	3	0	2	0	5 (Note: Two appearances and two goals in EFL Trophy; three appearances in EFL League Two play-offs)	2	45	2
Morecambe	2021–22	League One	32	0	2	0	1	0	3	0	38	0
Morecambe	2022–23	League One	27	0	1	0	1	0	4	0	33	0
Morecambe	Total		59	0	3	0	2	0	7	0	71	0
Crewe Alexandra	2023–24	League Two	38	0	3	0	2	0	4 (Note: Two appearances in EFL Trophy; two appearances in EFL League Two play-offs)	0	47	0
Crewe Alexandra	2024–25	League Two	38	3	0	0	1	0	4	1	43	4
Crewe Alexandra	Total		76	3	3	0	3	0	8	1	90	4
Glentoran	2025–26	NIFL Premiership	21	3	0	0	0	0	2 (Note: Appearances in Irish League Cup)	0	23	3
Career total			224	6	9	0	7	0	30	3	270	9

== Honours ==
Bury

- EFL League Two runner-up: 2018–19

Morecambe

- EFL League Two play-offs: 2021
