= Tyler Brownsword =

English footballer

Personal information
- Full name: Tyler Shawn Brownsword
- Date of birth: 31 December 1999 (age 26)
- Place of birth: South Shields, England
- Position: Midfielder

Team information
- Current team: Chester-le-Street Town

Youth career
- Morecambe

Senior career*
| Years | Team | Apps | (Gls) |
| 2018–2020 | Morecambe | 1 | (0) |
| 2024–2025 | Hebburn Town | 0 | (0) |
| 2025– | Chester-le-Street Town | | |
- * Club domestic league appearances and goals as of 12:23, 2 July 2025 (UTC)

Tyler Shawn Brownsword (born 31 December 1999) is an English professional footballer who plays as a midfielder for Northern League Division Two club Chester-le-Street Town.

== Career ==
Brownsword came through the Morecambe youth-team to make his debut in the English Football League on 23 March 2019, coming on as a 71st-minute substitute for Sam Lavelle in a 4–0 defeat at Swindon Town.

In July 2024, Brownsword was registered to play for Hebburn Town first-team, having joined the club's reserve side that summer where he was appointed vice-captain.

In June 2025, Brownsword joined Northern League Division Two side Chester-le-Street Town.

== Statistics ==
As of 27 September 2019

Appearances and goals by club, season and competition
| Club | Season | League | | | FA Cup | | EFL Cup | | Other | | Total | |
| Club | Season | Division | Apps | Goals | Apps | Goals | Apps | Goals | Apps | Goals | Apps | Goals |
|---|---|---|---|---|---|---|---|---|---|---|---|---|
| Morecambe | 2018–19 | EFL League Two | 1 | 0 | 0 | 0 | 0 | 0 | 0 | 0 | 1 | 0 |
| Morecambe | 2019–20 | EFL League Two | 0 | 0 | 0 | 0 | 0 | 0 | 0 | 0 | 0 | 0 |
| Morecambe | Total | | 1 | 0 | 0 | 0 | 0 | 0 | 0 | 0 | 1 | 0 |
| Career total | | | 1 | 0 | 0 | 0 | 0 | 0 | 0 | 0 | 1 | 0 |
