= Carlos Mendes Gomes =

Bissau-Guinean footballer (born 1998)

Personal information
- Full name: Carlos Mendes Gomes
- Date of birth: 14 November 1998 (age 27)
- Place of birth: Yeumbeul, Senegal
- Height: 1.78 m (5 ft 10 in)
- Positions: Left winger; attacking midfielder

Youth career
- Lanzarote
- Getafe
- Atlético Madrid

Senior career*
| Years | Team | Apps | (Gls) |
| 2016–2018 | West Didsbury & Chorlton | | |
| 2018–2021 | Morecambe | 74 | (17) |
| 2021–2023 | Luton Town | 9 | (0) |
| 2022–2023 | → Fleetwood Town (loan) | 32 | (7) |
| 2023–2026 | Bolton Wanderers | 28 | (2) |
| 2025–2026 | → Exeter City (loan) | 21 | (1) |

International career^{‡}
| 2023– | Guinea-Bissau | 5 | (0) |
- * Club domestic league appearances and goals as of 17:28, 2 May 2026 (UTC) ‡ National team caps and goals as of 22:15, 19 February 2025 (UTC)

Carlos Mendes Gomes (born 14 November 1998) is a professional footballer who last played as a left winger or attacking midfielder for EFL Championship club Bolton Wanderers. Born in Senegal, he plays for the Guinea-Bissau national team.

== Early life ==
Born in Yeumbeul, Dakar Region, to a family of Bissau-Guinean and Gambian descent, Mendes Gomes and his family moved to Spain when he was a child, after his father Carlos sought work in construction. The family moved to Lanzarote. He is the cousin of the Gambian footballer Jacob Mendy. He was naturalized as a Spanish citizen.

== Club career ==
=== Early career ===
After spending 10 years at UD Lanzarote, Mendes Gomes moved on his own to Madrid aged 15, where he began playing for Getafe. A season later he signed for Atlético Madrid's youth teams.

His family then moved to England, after his father thought it was better for the children's education, with the family relocating to Salford. Mendes Gomes could not speak any English and did not play football for a year. He then began playing for West Didsbury & Chorlton, scoring seven league goals in 50 games in all competitions during his two-season spell.

=== Morecambe ===
In May 2018, Mendes Gomes signed for Morecambe alongside Lamin Jagne, after being scouted whilst studying at The Manchester College and playing for their football academy. He made his professional debut on 14 August 2018, replacing Rhys Oates in a 3–1 EFL Cup away loss against Preston North End. He made 19 appearances for the club across the 2018–19 season, with 15 appearances coming in League Two. A one-year contract option was exercised by Morecambe at the end of the 2018–19 season.

Mendes Gomes scored his first goal for Morecambe in a 2–1 defeat at home to Oldham Athletic on 26 December 2019. He was offered a new contract at the end of the 2019–20 season.

In April 2021 he was linked with a transfer away from the club following a series of strong performances, which attracted praise from Morecambe manager Derek Adams. In May 2021 he was voted the Supporters' Player Of The Season. On 31 May 2021, he scored a 107th-minute penalty in the League Two play-off final, securing a 1–0 win against Newport County and Morecambe's first ever promotion to the third tier of English football. In June 2021 the club activated an extension to his contract. He was the club's top scorer in the 2020–21 season, with 15 goals.

=== Luton Town ===
On 26 June 2021, Mendes Gomes signed for Championship side Luton Town for an undisclosed fee. In January 2022 he assisted Luton teammate Dion Pereira secure a loan move to Bradford City, who were managed by Derek Adams, who had managed Mendes Gomes at Morecambe.

He moved on loan to Fleetwood Town in August 2022.

=== Bolton Wanderers ===
On 24 July 2023 he signed for Bolton Wanderers for an undisclosed fee. The transfer was reported to be around £300,000 by The Bolton News.

On 1 September 2025 he joined Exeter City on loan. On 26 May 2026, Bolton confirmed that Mendes Gomes would leave at the end of his contract.

== International career ==
Mendes Gomes was born in Senegal and is of Bissau-Guinean and Gambian descent, and raised in Spain. On 3 November 2023, he was called up to the Guinea-Bissau national football team. He debuted with Guinea-Bissau in a 1–0 win over Djibouti on 20 November 2023.

== Career statistics ==
=== Club ===
As of match played 2 May 2026

Appearances and goals by club, season and competition
| Club | Season | League | | | FA Cup | | League Cup | | Other | | Total | |
| Club | Season | Division | Apps | Goals | Apps | Goals | Apps | Goals | Apps | Goals | Apps | Goals |
|---|---|---|---|---|---|---|---|---|---|---|---|---|
| Morecambe | 2018–19 | League Two | 15 | 0 | 0 | 0 | 1 | 0 | 3 (Note: Appearance(s) in the EFL Trophy.) | 0 | 19 | 0 |
| Morecambe | 2019–20 | League Two | 16 | 2 | 0 | 0 | 0 | 0 | 2 | 0 | 18 | 2 |
| Morecambe | 2020–21 | League Two | 43 | 15 | 3 | 0 | 3 | 0 | 5 (Note: 2 appearances in the EFL Trophy; 3 appearances and 1 goal in the Play-Offs.) | 1 | 54 | 16 |
| Morecambe | Total | | 74 | 17 | 3 | 0 | 4 | 0 | 10 | 1 | 91 | 18 |
| Luton Town | 2021–22 | Championship | 9 | 0 | 3 | 1 | 1 | 0 | 1 | 0 | 14 | 1 |
| Luton Town | 2022–23 | Championship | 0 | 0 | 0 | 0 | 1 | 1 | 0 | 0 | 1 | 1 |
| Luton Town | Total | | 9 | 0 | 3 | 1 | 2 | 1 | 1 | 0 | 15 | 2 |
| Fleetwood Town (loan) | 2022–23 | League One | 32 | 7 | 3 | 1 | 0 | 0 | 2 | 1 | 37 | 9 |
| Bolton Wanderers | 2023–24 | League One | 16 | 2 | 2 | 0 | 2 | 0 | 3 | 2 | 23 | 4 |
| Bolton Wanderers | 2024–25 | League One | 11 | 0 | 0 | 0 | 0 | 0 | 1 | 0 | 12 | 0 |
| Bolton Wanderers | 2025–26 | League One | 1 | 0 | 0 | 0 | 1 | 0 | 0 | 0 | 2 | 0 |
| Bolton Wanderers | Total | | 28 | 2 | 2 | 0 | 3 | 0 | 4 | 2 | 37 | 4 |
| Exeter City (loan) | 2025–26 | League One | 21 | 1 | 1 | 0 | 0 | 0 | 0 | 0 | 22 | 1 |
| Career Total | | | 164 | 27 | 12 | 2 | 9 | 1 | 17 | 4 | 202 | 34 |

=== International ===
As of match played 22 January 2024

Appearances and goals by national team and year
| National team | Year | Apps | Goals |
|---|---|---|---|
| Guinea-Bissau | 2023 | 1 | 0 |
| Guinea-Bissau | 2024 | 4 | 0 |
| Total | | 5 | 0 |

== Honours ==
Morecambe

- EFL League Two play-offs: 2021
