= Joe Lynch (footballer) =

English footballer (born 1999)

Personal information
- Full name: Joseph Steven Lynch
- Date of birth: 11 October 1999 (age 27)
- Place of birth: Whiston, England
- Height: 1.81 m (5 ft 11 in)
- Position: Midfielder

Team information
- Current team: Runcorn Linnets

Youth career
- Crewe Alexandra

Senior career*
Years	Team	Apps	(Gls)
2019–2020	Morecambe	0	(0)
2020–2021	Lower Breck	4	(5)
2021–2022	Runcorn Linnets	31	(5)
2022–2023	Chester	23	(2)
2023–	Runcorn Linnets	21	(2)
- * Club domestic league appearances and goals as of 22:01, 18 March 2024 (UTC)~

Joseph Steven Lynch is an English professional footballer who plays as a midfielder for Runcorn Linnets.

== Career ==
After playing for Crewe Alexandra, Lynch signed for Morecambe on non-contract terms in July 2019. He made his first-team debut on 3 September 2019 in the EFL Trophy. He left the club in January 2020. He signed for Lower Breck in September 2020. He moved to Runcorn Linnets in May 2021. Lynch followed manager Calum McIntyre to National League North club Chester in June 2022. He returned to Runcorn Linnets after one season with Chester.

== Career statistics ==
As of 18 March 2024

Appearances and goals by club, season and competition
Club	Season	League			FA Cup		League Cup		Other		Total	
Club	Season	Division	Apps	Goals	Apps	Goals	Apps	Goals	Apps	Goals	Apps	Goals
Morecambe	2019–20	League Two	0	0	0	0	0	0	1 (Note: Appearance in the Football League Trophy)	0	1	0
Lower Breck	2020–21	NWCFL Division One North	4	5	0	0	—		2 (Note: Appearance(s) in FA Vase)	2	6	7
Runcorn Linnets	2021–22	NPL Division One West	31	5	5	0	—		2 (Note: Appearance(s) in FA Trophy)	0	38	5
Chester	2022–23	National League North	23	2	4	0	—		3 (Note: Two appearances in FA Trophy, one appearance and one goal in Cheshire Senior Cup)	1	30	3
Runcorn Linnets	2023–24	NPL Division One West	21	2	4	1	—		4 (Note: One appearance in FA Trophy, two appearances and three goals in Liverpool Senior Cup, one appearance in Cheshire Senior Cup)	3	29	6
Career total			79	14	13	1	0	0	12	6	104	21
