= Adam Phillips (footballer) =

English footballer (born 1998)

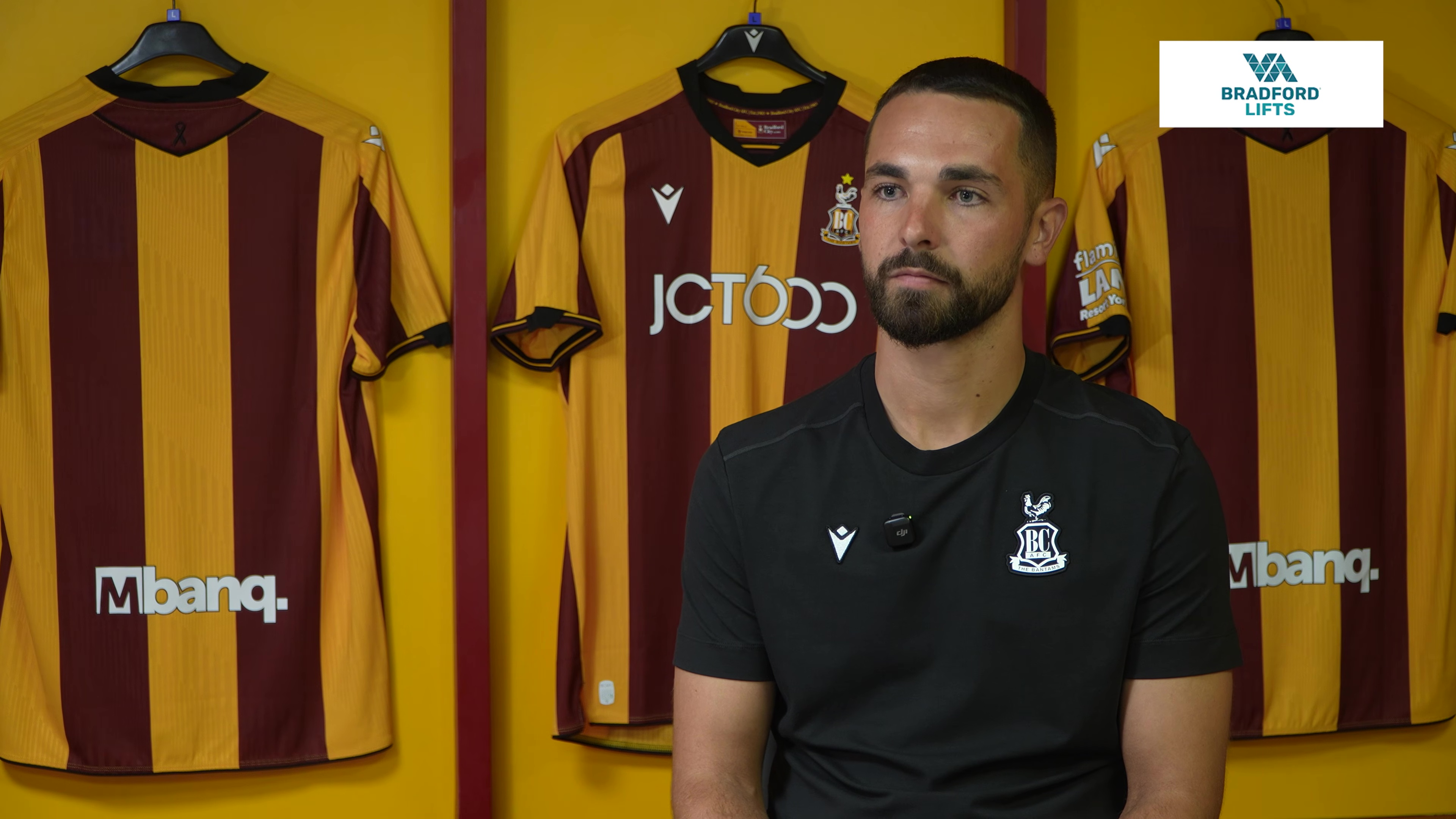
- Phillips training with Bradford City in 2026

Personal information
- Full name: Adam Lee Phillips
- Date of birth: 15 January 1998 (age 28)
- Place of birth: Garstang, England
- Height: 5 ft 11 in (1.80 m)
- Position: Midfielder

Team information
- Current team: Bradford City
- Number: 8

Youth career
- –2009: Blackburn Rovers
- 2009–2017: Liverpool

Senior career*
Years	Team	Apps	(Gls)
2017–2019	Norwich City	0	(0)
2018	→ Cambridge United (loan)	4	(0)
2018	→ Hamilton Academical (loan)	0	(0)
2019–2022	Burnley	0	(0)
2020	→ Morecambe (loan)	11	(4)
2020–2021	→ Morecambe (loan)	25	(8)
2021	→ Accrington Stanley (loan)	22	(2)
2021–2022	→ Morecambe (loan)	38	(6)
2022–2026	Barnsley	156	(37)
2026–	Bradford City	12	(0)

International career
2013	England U16	2	(0)
2014	England U17	3	(1)
- * Club domestic league appearances and goals as of 7 November 2026 (UTC)

Adam Lee Phillips (born 15 January 1998) is an English professional footballer who plays as a midfielder for EFL League One club Bradford City.

== Playing career ==
=== Liverpool ===
Phillips joined the Liverpool Academy from the Blackburn Rovers Academy at the age of 11 in 2009, and would spend the next eight years with the club. At the age of 16 he appeared as a substitute in a pre-season friendly with Brøndby IF under Brendan Rodgers in July 2014, but later struggled with a recurrent back injury.

=== Norwich City ===
He was released in May 2017, and signed a two-year contract with EFL Championship club Norwich City two months later following a trial period. On 4 February 2019, Norwich City announced that Phillips contract had been cancelled by mutual consent.

==== Cambridge United (loan) ====
On 3 January 2018, he joined EFL League Two side Cambridge United on loan until the end of the 2017–18 season, a move which Norwich under-23 manager Matthew Gill described as "the next step on his path". He made his debut in the English Football League for the "Us" on 13 January, in "an uneventful goalless draw" with Mansfield Town at the Abbey Stadium. He featured in three further matches before dropping out of the first-team picture as manager Shaun Derry lost his job; however Gill stated that "a manager change is one of those real-life scenarios so I think what he's getting exposed to now is fantastic".

==== Hamilton Academical (loan) ====
He moved on loan to Hamilton Academical in July 2018. The loan was cancelled in August 2018, after Phillips had made two cup appearances.

=== Burnley ===
In August 2019, he joined Burnley on a one-year contract following a successful trial.

==== Morecambe (loan) ====
On 2 January 2020, Phillips joined Morecambe on loan until the end of the season, alongside fellow Burnley player Ryan Cooney. On 29 February, he received the first straight red card of his career after a late tackle on Crewe's Perry Ng in the 94th minute. He contributed with 4 goals and 3 assists in 11 League Two matches.

On 12 August 2020, Phillips rejoined Morecambe on loan until the end of the season.

==== Accrington Stanley (loan) ====
On 1 February 2021, Phillips joined League One side Accrington Stanley on loan for the remainder of the 2020–21 season.

==== Return to Morecambe (loan) ====
On 27 July 2021, Phillips went again to Morecambe on loan.

=== Barnsley ===
In September 2022, Phillips joined Barnsley on a three-year contract for an undisclosed fee .

Phillips was awarded the EFL League One Player of the Month award for February 2024 having scored four goals in five matches, assisting a further three.

On 12 January 2026, Phillips scored against boyhood club Liverpool FC in a 4-1 defeat in the 3rd Round of the FA Cup.

=== Bradford City ===
On 19 June 2026, Phillips joined EFL League One side Bradford City on a three-year deal for an undisclosed fee.

== Career statistics ==
As of 27 October 2026

Appearances and goals by club, season and competition
Club	Season	League			National cup (Note: Includes FA Cup, Scottish Cup)		League cup (Note: Includes EFL Cup, Scottish League Cup)		Other		Total	
Club	Season	Division	Apps	Goals	Apps	Goals	Apps	Goals	Apps	Goals	Apps	Goals
Norwich City	2017–18	Championship	0	0	0	0	0	0	—		0	0
Norwich City	2018–19	Championship	0	0	0	0	0	0	—		0	0
Norwich City	Total		0	0	0	0	0	0	—		0	0
Cambridge United (loan)	2017–18	League Two	4	0	—		—		—		4	0
Hamilton Academical (loan)	2018–19	Scottish Premiership	0	0	0	0	2	0	1 (Note: Appearance in Scottish Challenge Cup for the Under-21s team)	0	3	0
Burnley	2019–20	Premier League	0	0	0	0	0	0	—		0	0
Burnley	2020–21	Premier League	0	0	—		—		—		0	0
Burnley	2021–22	Premier League	0	0	—		—		—		0	0
Burnley	2022–23	Championship	0	0	0	0	0	0	—		0	0
Burnley	Total		0	0	0	0	0	0	0	0	0	0
Morecambe (loan)	2019–20	League Two	11	4	—		—		—		11	4
Morecambe (loan)	2020–21	League Two	25	8	3	1	3	1	2 (Note: Appearance(s) in EFL Trophy)	0	33	10
Accrington Stanley (loan)	2020–21	League One	22	2	—		—		—		22	2
Morecambe (loan)	2021–22	League One	38	6	1	0	2	1	1	0	42	7
Barnsley	2022–23	League One	35	8	3	2	0	0	6 (Note: Three appearances in EFL Trophy, three appearances in EFL League One Play-Offs)	0	44	10
Barnsley	2023–24	League One	42	11	2	0	0	0	1	0	45	11
Barnsley	2024–25	League One	36	9	2	1	3	0	0	0	41	10
Barnsley	2025–26	League One	43	9	2	1	2	1	3	0	50	11
Barnsley	Total		156	37	9	4	5	1	10	0	180	42
Bradford City	2026–27	League One	11	0	0	0	4	1	2	0	17	1
Career total			267	57	13	5	16	4	16	0	312	66

== Honours ==
Individual

- EFL League One Player of the Month: February 2024
- Barnsley Player of the Season: 2023–24
