= Jordan Cranston =

Footballer (born 1993)

Personal information
- Full name: Jordan Christopher Cranston
- Date of birth: 11 November 1993 (age 33)
- Place of birth: Wednesfield, England
- Position: Left-back

Team information
- Current team: AFC Telford United

Senior career*
Years	Team	Apps	(Gls)
2013–2014	Wolverhampton Wanderers	0	(0)
2014	→ Nuneaton Town (loan)	7	(0)
2014	Hednesford Town	0	(0)
2014	Nuneaton Town	1	(0)
2014–2015	Notts County	9	(0)
2015	→ Lincoln City (loan)	11	(0)
2015–2016	Gateshead	23	(1)
2016–2018	Cheltenham Town	75	(0)
2018–2020	Morecambe	59	(4)
2020–2022	Solihull Moors	62	(1)
2022–2023	AFC Fylde	23	(0)
2023–2024	Hereford	13	(1)
2024	→ Redditch United (loan)	17	(0)
2024	Redditch United	11	(3)
2024–	AFC Telford United	16	(0)

International career^{‡}
2011	Wales U19	2	(0)
- * Club domestic league appearances and goals as of 10:59, 20 February 2025 (UTC) ‡ National team caps and goals as of 23:14, 21 October 2023 (UTC)

Jordan Christopher Cranston (born 11 November 1993) is a footballer who plays as a left-back for National League North club AFC Telford United. Born in England, he made two appearances for the Wales U19 national team.

== Club career ==
Cranston spent his early career with Wolverhampton Wanderers before signing his first professional contract, a one-year deal with a further year's option.

In March 2014, Cranston joined Conference Premier side Nuneaton Town on loan until the end of the season. Upon his return from a loan spell at Nuneaton Town, having made seven appearances, Cranston was released by Wolverhampton Wanderers management upon expiry of his contract.

After being released by Wolves, Cranston joined Hednesford Town on a free transfer. However, only seven days at the club, Cranston re-joined Nuneaton Town.

After one appearance on his return to Nuneaton Town, Cranston signed for Notts County on 1 September 2014, with the club's official website stating the contract was a short-term deal. On 2 September 2014, Cranston made his professional debut for Notts County in a 2–0 Football League Trophy victory against Mansfield Town. Cranston made his league debut for the club, playing as a left-back, in a 0–0 draw against Peterborough United eleven days later after making his debut. Having made eight appearances between September and October, Cranston was awarded an 18-month contract, keeping him until January 2016.

He joined Lincoln City on loan in February 2015, before being recalled in April 2015.

In July 2015 he went on trial with Gateshead, and later that month Cranston left Notts County by mutual consent. He signed a one-year contract with Gateshead in August 2015. Cranston joined National League rivals Cheltenham Town for an undisclosed fee on 30 January 2016, being given the number 21 shirt. On 10 May 2018, it was announced that Cranston would leave Cheltenham at the end of his current deal in June 2018. He signed for Morecambe in July 2018.

In May 2019, following the end of the 2018–19 season, Cranston's goal was voted 'Goal of the Season' at Morecambe's end of the season awards. In June 2019 he signed a new two-year contract with Morecambe.

In August 2020, Cranston joined Solihull Moors for an undisclosed fee on a two-year deal. Cranston was released on 6 June 2022, the following day from defeat in the 2022 National League play-off final.

On 20 June 2022, Cranston joined National League North club AFC Fylde on a one-year deal. His contract was not renewed at the end of the season.

After leaving AFC Fylde, on 28 June 2023, Cranston joined Hereford. On 13 January 2024, Cranston joined Southern League Premier Division Central club Redditch United on a one-month loan. On 12 February, it was announced that his loan would be extended until the end of the season. He left Hereford after just one season at the club.

On 6 June 2024, Cranston returned to Redditch United on a permanent deal. On 1 November 2024, he joined AFC Telford United.

== International career ==
Cranston made two appearances for Wales under-19s in 2011.

== Career statistics ==
As of match played 8 February 2025

Appearances and goals by club, season and competition
Club	Season	League			FA Cup		League Cup		Other		Total	
Club	Season	Division	Apps	Goals	Apps	Goals	Apps	Goals	Apps	Goals	Apps	Goals
Wolverhampton Wanderers	2013–14	League One	0	0	0	0	0	0	0	0	0	0
Nuneaton Town (loan)	2013–14	Conference Premier	7	0	0	0	—		0	0	7	0
Hednesford Town	2014–15	National League North	0	0	0	0	—		0	0	0	0
Nuneaton Town	2014–15	National League	1	0	0	0	—		0	0	1	0
Notts County	2014–15	League One	9	0	1	0	0	0	2 (Note: Appearance(s) in Football League Trophy)	0	12	0
Lincoln City (loan)	2014–15	National League	11	0	—		—		0	0	11	0
Gateshead	2015–16	National League	23	1	1	0	—		1 (Note: Appearance(s) in FA Trophy)	0	25	1
Cheltenham Town	2015–16	National League	15	0	—		—		—		15	0
Cheltenham Town	2016–17	League Two	38	0	2	0	2	0	4	0	46	0
Cheltenham Town	2017–18	League Two	22	0	1	0	2	0	2	0	27	0
Cheltenham Town	Total		75	0	3	0	4	0	6	0	88	0
Morecambe	2018–19	League Two	35	4	2	0	0	0	3	0	40	4
Morecambe	2019–20	League Two	24	0	1	0	1	0	2	0	28	0
Morecambe	Total		59	4	3	0	1	0	5	0	68	4
Solihull Moors	2020–21	National League	41	1	3	1	—		2	0	46	2
Solihull Moors	2021–22	National League	21	0	1	0	—		2	0	24	0
Solihull Moors	Total		62	1	4	1	—		4	0	70	2
AFC Fylde	2022–23	National League North	23	0	0	0	—		2	0	25	0
Hereford	2023–24	National League North	13	1	3	0	—		1	0	17	1
Redditch United (loan)	2023–24	Southern Premier Central	17	0	—		—		2 (Note: Appearance(s) in Worcestershire Senior Cup)	0	19	0
Redditch United	2024–25	Southern Premier Central	11	3	3	0	—		2 (Note: One appearance in FA Trophy, one appearance in Worcestershire Senior Cup)	0	16	3
Redditch United	Total		28	3	3	0	—		4	0	35	3
AFC Telford United	2024–25	Southern Premier Central	16	0	—		—		0	0	16	0
Career total			327	10	18	1	5	0	25	0	375	11

== Honours ==
Cheltenham Town

- National League: 2015–16
