= Samuel Lavelle =

Footballer (born 1996)

Sam Lavelle
Personal information
- Full name: Samuel Mark Lavelle
- Date of birth: 3 October 1996 (age 30)
- Place of birth: Blackpool, England
- Height: 1.88 m (6 ft 2 in)
- Position: Centre-back

Team information
- Current team: Hartlepool United (on loan from Grimsby Town)
- Number: 55

Youth career
- 2004–2015: Blackburn Rovers

Senior career*
Years	Team	Apps	(Gls)
2015–2016	Blackburn Rovers	0	(0)
2016–2017	Bolton Wanderers	0	(0)
2017–2021	Morecambe	139	(4)
2021–2023	Charlton Athletic	32	(2)
2023	→ Burton Albion (loan)	2	(0)
2023–2025	Carlisle United	83	(7)
2025–	Grimsby Town	6	(0)
2026–	→ Hartlepool United (loan)	4	(0)

International career
2013–2014	Scotland U18	2	(0)
2014–2015	Scotland U19	2	(0)
- * Club domestic league appearances and goals as of 23:23, 21 November 2026 (UTC)

Samuel Mark Lavelle (born 3 October 1996) is a professional footballer who plays as a centre-back for National League club Hartlepool United on loan from EFL League Two club Grimsby Town. Born in England, he represented Scotland at youth international level.

== Club career ==
=== Early career ===
Lavelle began his career with Blackburn Rovers, leaving at the end of the 2015–16 season.

He signed for Bolton Wanderers for the 2016–17 season. He was not retained for the 2017–18 season due to the club's transfer embargo; he spoke about how he felt he had been left "hung out to dry" and that the EFL "[were] punishing a young English player instead of Bolton Wanderers."

=== Morecambe ===
On 1 August 2017, he signed for Morecambe, being assigned the number 16 shirt until the expiry of his contract on 30 June 2018. Lavelle made his debut as a 93rd minute substitute for the League Two club, on 5 August, in the first competitive game of the season against Cheltenham Town in a 2–1 home win. He scored his first goal for Morecambe in a 4-3 EFL Cup defeat at Barnsley on 8 August 2017.

In November 2017 he received a two-match ban for "deception" after falsely winning a penalty. Lavelle signed a new contract with the club in April 2018, and then a further one in October 2019.

In recent times Sam Lavelle acquired the captain's armband for the Shrimps. On 31 May 2021, Lavelle captained Morecambe in their League Two play-off final victory, in doing so securing promotion to League One for the Shrimps for the first time in the club's history. This resulted in many supporters regarding him as one of the clubs' all-time greats.

=== Charlton Athletic ===
On 31 August 2021, Lavelle signed for Charlton Athletic on a three-year deal for a fee of around £300,000 with add ons. He scored his first Charlton goal in his second appearance for the club in a 2-1 League One defeat at Wycombe Wanderers on 18 September.

==== Burton Albion (loan) ====
On 31 January 2023, Lavelle joined Burton Albion on loan until the end of the 2022–23 season. Lavelle's loan spell was cut short due to a shoulder injury.

=== Carlisle United ===
On 7 July 2023, Lavelle joined Carlisle United.

On 16 May 2025, the club announced he would be leaving on 30 June 2025 when his contract expired.

=== Grimsby Town ===
On 25 July 2025, Lavelle signed a two-year deal with Grimsby Town.

Lavelle made his competitive debut for the club on 12 August 2025, starting a 3–1 victory over Shrewsbury Town in the first round of the EFL Cup. He was substituted at half-time after sustaining a calf injury, with manager David Artell subsequently confirming that a scan had shown he would be unavailable for several weeks. Following his recovery, Lavelle made his first League Two appearance for Grimsby on 18 October, starting a 1–0 home victory over Gillingham.

Lavelle suffered another calf problem in February 2026, causing him to miss Grimsby's draw with Newport County. In April, Artell said that Lavelle had sustained a further injury and would undergo a surgical assessment to determine whether an operation was required. He finished his first season with 12 appearances in all competitions, including six in League Two.

On 19 May 2026, Grimsby announced that Lavelle, who remained under contract for the following season, had been made available for transfer. His only appearance for Grimsby during the opening months of the 2026–27 season came in the EFL Trophy.

==== Hartlepool United (loan) ====
On 13 October 2026, Lavelle joined National League club Hartlepool United on an initial 28-day loan. He made his Hartlepool debut four days later, starting a 2–0 home defeat by Marine in the fourth qualifying round of the FA Cup. On 9 November 2026, the loan was extended for a further month.

== Career statistics ==
As of match played 21 November 2026

Appearances and goals by club, season and competition
Club	Season	League			FA Cup		League Cup		Other		Total	
Club	Season	Division	Apps	Goals	Apps	Goals	Apps	Goals	Apps	Goals	Apps	Goals
Blackburn Rovers	2015–16	Championship	0	0	0	0	0	0	—		0	0
Bolton Wanderers	2016–17	League One	0	0	0	0	0	0	0	0	0	0
Morecambe	2017–18	League Two	27	1	0	0	1	1	3 (Note: Three appearances in the Football League Trophy)	0	31	2
Morecambe	2018–19	League Two	31	1	2	0	0	0	3	0	36	1
Morecambe	2019–20	League Two	31	1	1	0	1	0	3	0	36	1
Morecambe	2020–21	League Two	45	1	2	0	2	0	6 (Note: Three appearances in the EFL League Two Play-offs)	1	55	2
Morecambe	2021–22	League One	5	0	0	0	2	0	0	0	7	0
Morecambe	Total		139	4	5	0	6	1	15	1	165	6
Charlton Athletic	2021–22	League One	19	2	0	0	0	0	0	0	19	2
Charlton Athletic	2022–23	League One	13	0	3	0	4	0	2 (Note: Two appearances in the EFL Trophy)	1	22	1
Charlton Athletic	Total		32	2	3	0	4	0	2	1	41	3
Burton Albion (loan)	2022–23	League One	2	0	0	0	0	0	0	0	2	0
Carlisle United	2023–24	League One	46	3	1	0	1	0	1 (Note: One appearance in the EFL Trophy)	0	49	3
Carlisle United	2024–25	League Two	37	4	1	0	1	0	1 (Note: One appearance in the EFL Trophy)	0	40	4
Carlisle United	Total		83	7	2	0	2	0	2	0	89	7
Grimsby Town	2025–26	League Two	6	0	2	0	2	0	2 (Note: Two appearances in the EFL Trophy)	0	12	0
Grimsby Town	2026–27	League Two	0	0	0	0	0	0	1 (Note: One appearance in the EFL Trophy)	0	1	0
Grimsby Town	Total		6	0	2	0	2	0	3	0	13	0
Hartlepool United (loan)	2026–27	National League	4	0	1	0	0	0	1	0	6	0
Career total			266	14	12	0	14	1	23	2	316	16

== Honours ==
Morecambe

- EFL League Two play-offs: 2021
