= Ritchie Sutton =

English footballer (born 1986)

Personal information
- Full name: Ritchie Aidan Sutton
- Date of birth: 29 April 1986 (age 40)
- Place of birth: Burslem, Stoke-on-Trent, England
- Height: 6 ft 0 in (1.83 m)
- Position: Defender

Youth career
- 1997–2005: Crewe Alexandra

Senior career*
Years	Team	Apps	(Gls)
2005–2007	Crewe Alexandra	0	(0)
2005	→ Leek Town (loan)	9	(0)
2005–2006	→ Leek Town (loan)	7	(0)
2006	→ Stafford Rangers (loan)	2	(0)
2006–2007	→ Stafford Rangers (loan)	37	(0)
2007–2008	Stafford Rangers	40	(0)
2008–2009	Northwich Victoria	4	(0)
2008	→ FC Halifax Town (loan)		
2009	FC Halifax Town		
2009–2010	Nantwich Town		
2010–2011	Port Vale	11	(0)
2011–2015	Mansfield Town	136	(0)
2015–2019	Tranmere Rovers	98	(7)
2016	→ Barrow (loan)	10	(0)
2019–2020	Morecambe	29	(1)
2020–2022	Altrincham	21	(1)
2021–2022	→ Alfreton Town (loan)	3	(0)
2021–2022	→ Alfreton Town (loan)	23	(1)
2022–2023	Nantwich Town	4	(0)
2023	Whitchurch Alport		
2023–2024	Hednesford Town	15	(1)
2024	Bootle	12	(2)
2024–2025	Kidsgrove Athletic	26	(2)
Total		487	(16)

Managerial career
- 2022–2023: Nantwich Town (joint-manager)
- * Club domestic league appearances and goals

Ritchie Aidan Sutton (born 29 April 1986) is an English former football player and manager who played as a defender.

Beginning his career at Crewe Alexandra, he never made the first team. Instead, he enjoyed loan spells at non-League Leek Town and Stafford Rangers. He was released by Crewe in 2007. He returned to the non-League scene with Northwich Victoria, FC Halifax Town and Nantwich Town. In the summer of 2010, he signed with Port Vale before making the switch to Mansfield Town the following year. He won the Conference National title with Mansfield in 2012–13 and won the club's Player of the Season award in 2014–15. He moved to Tranmere Rovers in May 2015 and was loaned to Barrow in March 2016. He helped Tranmere to win promotion back into the English Football League with victory in the National League play-off final in 2018, before he was allowed to join Morecambe in January 2019. He returned to non-League football with Altrincham in August 2020. He was loaned out to Alfreton Town for the 2021–22 season and joined Nantwich Town as a player-coach in July 2022.

Sutton was appointed joint manager at Nantwich Town in September 2022 alongside Gary Taylor-Fletcher. He later resumed his playing career with Whitchurch Alport, Hednesford Town, Bootle and Kidsgrove Athletic.

== Playing career ==
=== Early career ===
Sutton started as a youth team player at Crewe Alexandra, turning professional in the summer of 2005. His first season was spent on two separate loan spells at local side Leek Town, of the Northern Premier League Premier Division. He made his senior debut on 29 January 2005, in a 3–2 victory at Farsley Celtic. He made a total of 19 appearances across the two loan spells. In March 2006, he joined another local non-League side, Stafford Rangers, on loan. Rangers achieved promotion from the Conference North through the play-offs at the end of the season.

In May 2006 he was offered a new one-year contract by manager Dario Gradi. At the start of the 2006–07 season he was sent out on loan back to Stafford Rangers, now in the Conference National. The loan deal was initially only a month long, but ended up being extended to the end of the season, despite Sutton spending a month out to undergo knee surgery. However, when he returned to Gresty Road he was informed that he would not be offered a new contract, at which point he signed with Rangers permanently. By the end of the season, he was an occasional captain. He made 79 Conference appearances for the club over all his spells.

In the summer of 2008, he moved on to Conference club Northwich Victoria, though joined FC Halifax Town of the Northern Premier League Division One North on loan in December of that year. In January 2009, he joined Halifax permanently, though would only remain at the club for the rest of the season.

He signed for Nantwich Town in June 2009, and had to turn down an offer of a trial at Football League club Port Vale in the summer of 2009 because of this contract. Manager Pete Hall felt Sutton could play professionally again, but warned of the player's disciplinary record. He made forty appearances for the "Dabbers" in 2009–10; signing a new, more flexible contract in summer 2010. During the season he saw four red cards. Throughout the season he also worked at a Crewe-based accident management company.

=== Port Vale ===
In July 2010, he had a successful trial at League Two Port Vale, and was offered a short-term deal. This meant a return to professional football, as he gave up a full-time job to join the Vale. He was suspended for the opening six games of the season due to his record of four red cards in the previous season (this suspension included a previously unserved three match ban). He made his debut in the Football League Trophy on 31 August 2010, in a 2–1 win over Rochdale at Vale Park. In December he signed an extension to keep him at the club until the end of the season, despite having made just five appearances, manager Micky Adams felt Sutton performed well when called upon. Sutton had also shed 2 stone (28 lb; 13 kg) within six months.

=== Mansfield Town ===
In June 2011, he was unveiled at Conference club Mansfield Town, having signed a one-year contract a free transfer. Manager Paul Cox said that "I've had my eye on Ritchie since his days at Crewe. He is a big strong 'unit' who will hopefully be a good acquisition for the club." He was one of three Mansfield players injured in a pre-season friendly with Ilkeston, and so missed the start of the season. He made his debut from the bench on 27 August, in a 3–0 home win over Kettering Town, before he was given his first start in a 1–0 win against Stockport County two days later. He played the next twenty consecutive league and FA Cup games until a second yellow card picked up in a 3–1 defeat at Southport saw him suspended for one game. The "Stags" reached the play-off semi-finals; however, Sutton was sent off at Field Mill for a late challenge on York City's Matty Blair, and watched from the sidelines as his team were knocked out of the play-offs in extra time. Mansfield won promotion into the Football League as Conference champions in 2012–13. However, Sutton was largely confined to the bench following the arrival of James Jennings in January. His contract was extended by a further year in the summer.

He made 39 appearances during the 2013–14 campaign, and became a key feature of the club's 3-5-2 formation. During the 2014–15 season he was asked to play as an attacking right-back by manager Adam Murray. He adapted well to the role, and was named as the club's Player of the Season.

=== Tranmere Rovers ===
Sutton signed a two-year contract with Tranmere Rovers, newly-relegated into the Conference Premier, in May 2015 after impressing manager Gary Brabin with his "no-nonsense" defending. He was sent off in a 1–1 draw at Welling United on 5 September, though had the red card overturned on appeal. He made 24 appearances in the first half of the campaign, before losing his first-team place after Steve McNulty and Michael Ihiekwe formed a centre-back partnership in December. Sutton joined Barrow on loan until the end of the 2015–16 season on 4 March 2016. His loan spell at Holker Street was ended early after he suffered a slight hamstring tear in his tenth appearances for the club. Speaking in December 2016, Sutton said new Tranmere boss Micky Mellon had improved his game after playing Sutton in a centre-back partnership alongside Steve McNulty as Tranmere conceded only 16 goals in a run of 24 games. Having scored four goals in 27 games during the 2016–17 season, a season cut short due to an Achilles injury, he signed a new two-year contract in May 2017.

He scored five goals in 49 appearances as Rovers won promotion back into the English Football League at the end of the 2017–18 season. He was taken off at half-time of the play-off final victory over Boreham Wood at Wembley Stadium after picking up an injury.

=== Morecambe ===
On 9 January 2019, Sutton signed with League Two side Morecambe; "Shrimps" manager Jim Bentley said that "he's an out and out honest, solid defender who enjoys defending and will certainly add to our squad". He went on to play 14 games by the end of the 2018–19 season and remained under contract for the following campaign. On 14 December 2019, he was sent off for a foul on Dom Telford in a 3–0 defeat at Plymouth Argyle. He made 19 appearances throughout the 2019–20 season and was released by manager Derek Adams at the end of his contract.

=== Altrincham ===
On 12 August 2020, Sutton signed a two-year contract with recently promoted National League side Altrincham. He became a part-time professional at Moss Lane, which as a father suited his family commitments. Manager Phil Parkinson said that Sutton could be a good mentor for the younger players. He played 18 games in the 2020–21 season, scoring one goal.

On 10 September 2021, Sutton joined National League North side Alfreton Town on an initial one-month loan deal. In November 2021, he rejoined the club on loan until the end of the 2021–22 season. He featured 28 times in total during his two spells at North Street. Altrincham released him at the end of his contract.

=== Later career ===
Sutton joined Whitchurch Alport in the Midland League Premier Division, before signing with Northern Premier League Division One West side Hednesford Town in September 2023. He ended the 2023–24 season at divisional rivals Bootle. He began the 2024–25 campaign with Kidsgrove Athletic.

== Style of play ==
Sutton is a defender who plays primarily as an intelligent and physical centre-half, though he has also played as an attacking right-back.

== Management career ==
=== Nantwich Town ===
On 3 July 2022, Sutton returned to Northern Premier League Premier Division side Nantwich Town on a player-coach basis. Following a spell as interim manager, Sutton was given the role permanently on 21 September 2022, alongside Gary Taylor-Fletcher. The duo were sacked by the club in February 2023 with Nantwich sitting in the relegation zone, three points from safety.

== Personal life ==
Sutton supports Port Vale and has been a season-ticket holder at the club. He spent the first six years of his life in Burslem before his family relocated to Crewe. In June 2011, he was studying to complete a degree in Professional Sports Writing and Broadcasting at Staffordshire University, alongside former Port Vale teammates Gareth Owen, Adam Yates, and Justin Richards.

== Career statistics ==
Appearances and goals by club, season and competition
Club	Season	League			FA Cup		League Cup		Other		Total	
Club	Season	Division	Apps	Goals	Apps	Goals	Apps	Goals	Apps	Goals	Apps	Goals
Crewe Alexandra	2005–06	Championship	0	0	0	0	0	0	0	0	0	0
Crewe Alexandra	2006–07	League One	0	0	0	0	0	0	0	0	0	0
Crewe Alexandra	2007–08	League One	0	0	0	0	0	0	0	0	0	0
Crewe Alexandra	Total		0	0	0	0	0	0	0	0	0	0
Leek Town (loan)	2004–05	Northern Premier League; Premier Division	9	0	0	0	0	0	3	0	12	0
Leek Town (loan)	2005–06	Northern Premier League; Premier Division	7	0	0	0	2	0	0	0	9	0
Leek Town (loan)	Total		16	0	0	0	2	0	3	0	21	0
Stafford Rangers (loan)	2005–06	Conference North	2	0	0	0	—		0	0	2	0
Stafford Rangers (loan)	2006–07	Conference National	37	0	3	0	—		0	0	40	0
Stafford Rangers	2007–08	Conference National	40	0	0	0	—		0	0	40	0
Stafford Rangers	Total		79	0	3	0	0	0	0	0	82	0
Northwich Victoria	2008–09	Conference National	4	0	0	0	—		0	0	4	0
Port Vale	2010–11	League Two	11	0	0	0	0	0	2 (Note: Appearance(s) in the Football League Trophy / EFL Trophy.)	0	13	0
Mansfield Town	2011–12	Conference National	41	0	2	0	—		3 (Note: 1 Appearance in the play-offs and 2 appearances in the FA Trophy.)	0	46	0
Mansfield Town	2012–13	Conference National	25	0	3	0	—		2 (Note: Appearance(s) in the FA Trophy.)	0	30	0
Mansfield Town	2013–14	League Two	36	0	1	0	1	0	1	0	39	0
Mansfield Town	2014–15	League Two	34	0	2	0	1	0	1	0	38	0
Mansfield Town	Total		136	0	8	0	2	0	7	0	153	0
Tranmere Rovers	2015–16	National League	25	1	1	0	—		1	0	27	1
Tranmere Rovers	2016–17	National League	21	1	1	0	—		5 (Note: Appearance(s) in the play-offs.)	3	27	4
Tranmere Rovers	2017–18	National League	43	5	3	0	—		3	0	49	5
Tranmere Rovers	2018–19	League Two	9	1	1	0	0	0	2	0	12	1
Tranmere Rovers	Total		98	8	6	0	0	0	11	3	115	11
Barrow (loan)	2015–16	National League	10	0	0	0	—		0	0	10	0
Morecambe	2018–19	League Two	14	0	—		—		—		14	0
Morecambe	2019–20	League Two	15	1	0	0	2	0	2	0	19	1
Morecambe	Total		29	1	0	0	2	0	2	0	33	1
Altrincham	2020–21	National League	17	1	1	0	—		0	0	18	1
Altrincham	2021–22	National League	4	0	0	0	—		0	0	4	0
Altrincham	Total		21	1	1	0	0	0	0	0	22	1
Alfreton Town (loan)	2021–22	National League North	26	1	0	0	—		2	0	28	1
Nantwich Town	2022–23	Northern Premier League; Premier Division	4	0	1	0	—		0	0	5	0
Hednesford Town	2023–24	Northern Premier League; Division One West	15	1	0	0	—		2 (Note: Appearance(s) in the Staffordshire Senior Cup.)	0	17	1
Bootle	2023–24	Northern Premier League; Division One West	12	2	0	0	—		1	0	13	2
Kidsgrove Athletic	2024–25	Northern Premier League; Division One West	26	2	2	0	—		2	0	30	2
Kidsgrove Athletic	2025–26	Northern Premier League; Division One West	0	0	1	0	—		0	0	1	0
Kidsgrove Athletic	Total		26	2	3	0	0	0	2	0	31	2
Total (Note: Statistics for spells with FC Halifax Town, Nantwich Town and Whitchurch Alport unavailable.)			487	16	22	0	6	0	32	3	547	19

== Honours ==
Individual

- Mansfield Town F.C. Player of the Season: 2014–15

Stafford Rangers

- Conference North play-offs: 2006

Mansfield Town

- Conference National: 2012–13

Tranmere Rovers

- National League play-offs: 2018
