= Alex Kenyon =

English footballer

Personal information
- Full name: Alexander George Kenyon
- Date of birth: 17 July 1992 (age 34)
- Place of birth: Preston, England
- Height: 6 ft 0 in (1.82 m)
- Position: Midfielder

Team information
- Current team: AFC Fylde (assistant head coach)

Youth career
- Everton

Senior career*
Years	Team	Apps	(Gls)
2008–2009	Chorley		
2009–2012	Lancaster City	46	(10)
2012–2013	Stockport County	39	(3)
2013–2021	Morecambe	239	(9)
2021–2022	Scunthorpe United	7	(0)
2022	Ayr United	3	(0)
2022–2023	Chester	24	(1)
2023–2024	Curzon Ashton	31	(4)
2024–2025	Bamber Bridge	23	(1)
Total		412	(28)
- * Club domestic league appearances and goals as of 19:52, 22 June 2025 (UTC)

Alexander George Kenyon (born 17 July 1992) is an English former footballer who played as a midfielder. He is currently assistant head coach of National League club AFC Fylde.

== Career ==
Kenyon began his career with Everton before being released in the summer of 2008 and he then joined non-league Chorley. Kenyon then joined Lancaster City in the summer of 2009 before signing for Conference Premier side Stockport County in May 2012. After suffering relegation with County in 2012–13 he joined League Two side Morecambe on 27 June 2013.

He made his Football League debut on 10 August 2013 in a 1–1 draw with Torquay United. He signed a new contract in February 2014 which runs through to June 2016. On 28 June 2016 Kenyon signed a new 12-month deal with the club. In July 2019 he signed a new one-year contract with Morecambe.

Morecambe did not renew Kenyon's contract, making him a free agent in 2021. Scunthorpe United then signed him on a one-year deal.

Kenyon left Scunthorpe United on 28 January 2022 by mutual consent.

In March 2022, Kenyon signed for Scottish Championship side Ayr United.

In July 2022, Kenyon returned to England to join National League North club Chester.

In July 2023, Kenyon signed for Curzon Ashton.

In August 2024, Kenyon joined Northern Premier League Premier Division side Bamber Bridge.

== Coaching career ==
On 17 June 2025, Kenyon announced his retirement from football to take up the role of assistant head coach with National League North side AFC Fylde.

== Honours ==
Morecambe

- EFL League Two play-offs: 2021
