= Michael Howard (footballer, born 1999) =

English footballer

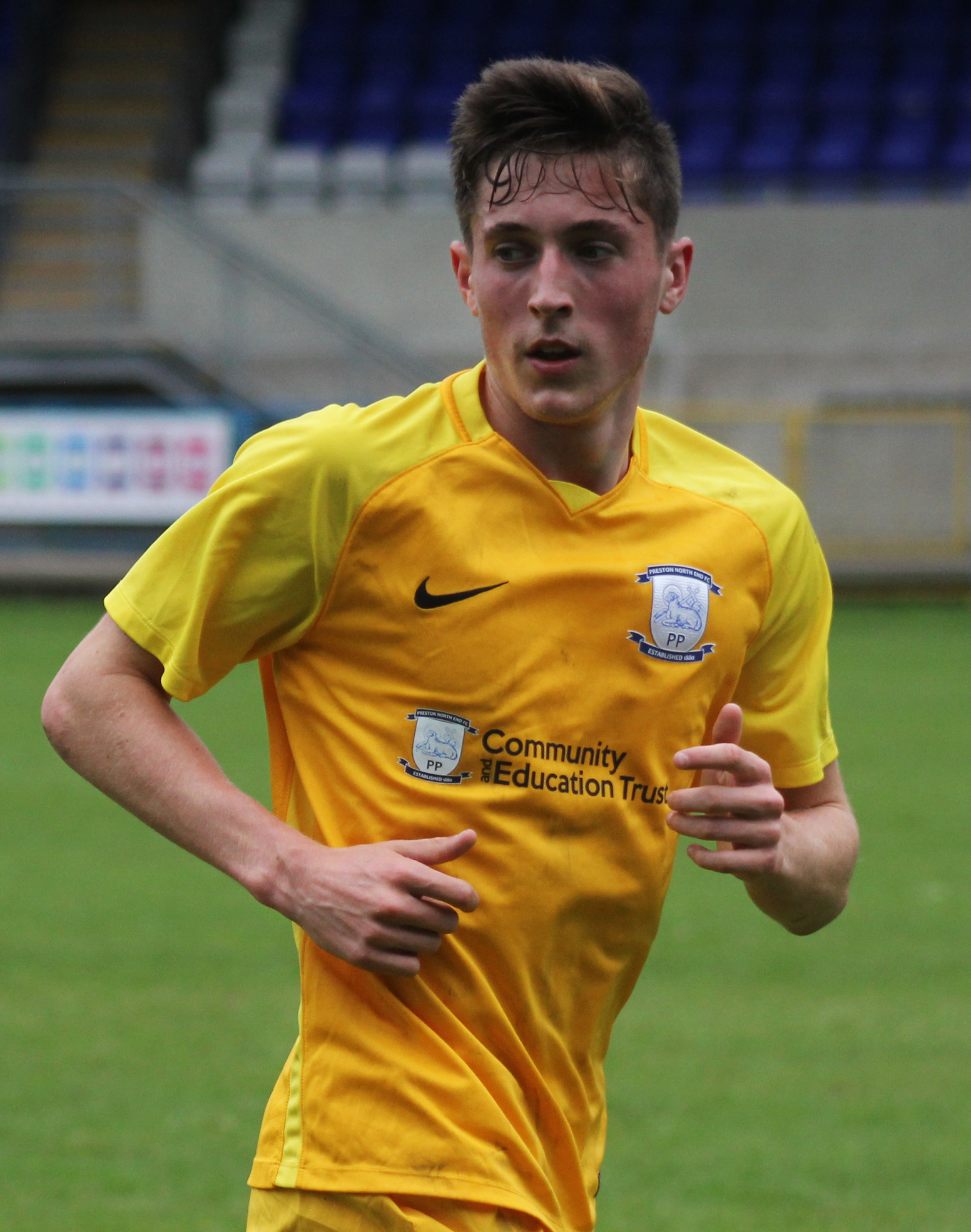
- Howard playing for Preston North End U18s in October 2017

Personal information
- Full name: Michael Leslie Howard
- Date of birth: 17 October 1999 (age 27)
- Place of birth: Southport, England
- Position: Striker

Team information
- Current team: Warrington Town

Youth career
- 2010–2017: Preston North End

Senior career*
Years	Team	Apps	(Gls)
2017–2019	Preston North End	0	(0)
2018	→ Cork City (loan)	6	(0)
2018–2019	→ Hednesford Town (loan)	19	(12)
2019	→ Stalybridge Celtic	12	(1)
2019–2020	Morecambe	3	(1)
2020	→ Marine (loan)	3	(1)
2020–2021	Marine	4	(0)
2021–2022	Skelmersdale United	26	(20)
2022–2024	Warrington Town	10	(0)
2024	→ Ashton Town (loan)		
2024–2025	City of Liverpool	20	(5)
2025–	Ashton Town		
- * Club domestic league appearances and goals as of 15:22, 11 June 2025 (UTC)

Michael Leslie Howard (born 17 October 1999) is an English professional footballer who plays as a striker for Ashton Town.

== Club career ==
=== Preston North End ===
Howard joined Preston North End at the age of 11 and progressed through the ranks up to the Under-18s.

On 28 November 2017, he featured in a 2–1 defeat to Bury in the Lancashire Senior Cup quarter-final.

In February 2018, Howard signed an 18-month professional contract with the option of a further year, and was immediately loaned out.

==== Cork City ====
On 20 February 2018, League of Ireland Premier Division club Cork City announced the signing of Howard on loan for the remainder of the season. He said he was influenced to make the move by several teammates who had previously played for the club, most notably Daryl Horgan.

On 24 February, Howard made his league debut as an 88th minute substitute for Kieran Sadlier in a 2–0 win against Waterford.

He was released by Preston at the end of the 2018–19 season.

=== Morecambe ===
Howard signed for EFL League Two club Morecambe on 28 May 2019. His first goal came against Wolverhampton Wanderers in the EFL Trophy, just two games into his spell at the club.

In February 2020 he joined Marine on loan until the end of the 2019–20 season.

Howard was released at the end of the 2019–20 season.

=== Non-League ===
In March 2022 he signed for Northern Premier League club Warrington Town on dual registration terms, having played a key role in Skelmersdale United's push for promotion in the North West Counties League Premier Division, firing 27 goals in 47 appearances in all competitions.

== Career statistics ==
As of match played 26 January 2018

Appearances and goals by club, season and competition
Club	Season	League			FA Cup		League Cup		Other		Total	
Club	Season	Division	Apps	Goals	Apps	Goals	Apps	Goals	Apps	Goals	Apps	Goals
Preston North End	2017–18	EFL Championship	0	0	0	0	0	0	1 (Note: One appearance in the Lancashire Senior Cup.)	0	1	0
Cork City (loan)	2018	League of Ireland Premier Division	1	0	0	0	0	0	0	0	1	0
Hednesford Town (Loan)	2018	Northern Premier League	8	5	2	1	1	0	0	0	11	6
Career total			9	5	2	1	1	0	1	0	13	6
