= Jordan Graham (footballer, born 1997) =

English footballer (born 1997)

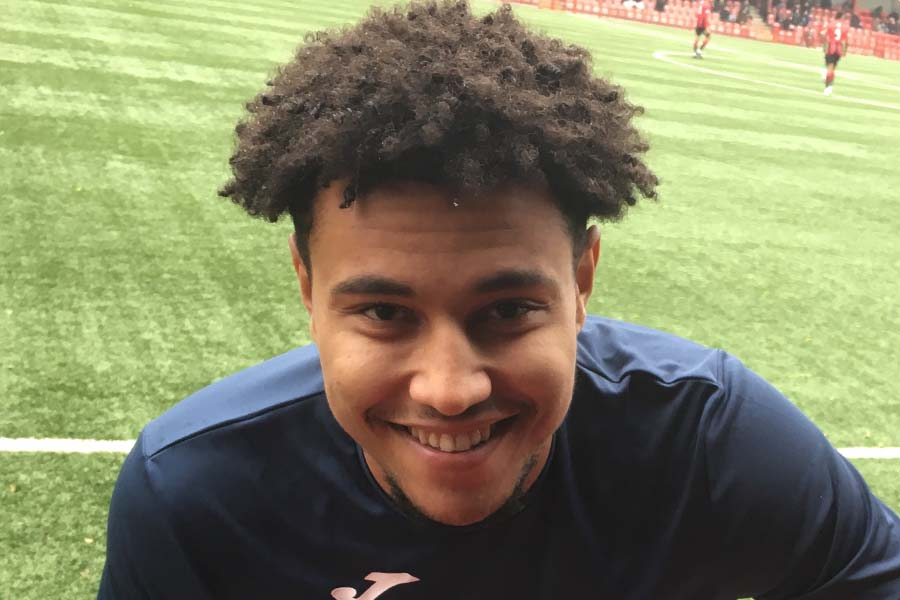
- Graham in 2020

Personal information
- Full name: Jordan Owen Graham
- Date of birth: 30 December 1997 (age 28)
- Place of birth: Peterborough, England
- Height: 1.88 m (6 ft 2 in)
- Position: Forward

Team information
- Current team: Spalding United

Youth career
- 2014–2015: Leicester City

Senior career*
| Years | Team | Apps | (Gls) |
| 2015–2017 | Oxford United | 0 | (0) |
| 2016 | → Didcot Town (loan) | 4 | (0) |
| 2017 | → Farnborough (loan) | 8 | (0) |
| 2017–2020 | Mansfield Town | 8 | (0) |
| 2017–2018 | → Hednesford Town (loan) | 33 | (10) |
| 2020 | Tamworth | 4 | (1) |
| 2022 | AFC Rushden & Diamonds | 5 | (3) |
| 2022–2023 | Kettering Town | 13 | (1) |
| 2023–2024 | Spalding United | 37 | (12) |
| 2024–2025 | Wellingborough Town | 1 | (0) |
| 2025- | AFC Rushden & Diamonds | 22 | (0) |
- * Club domestic league appearances and goals as of 21 January 2026

Jordan Owen Graham (born 30 December 1997) is an English footballer who plays as a forward for Northern Premier League Division One Midlands club AFC Rushden & Diamonds.

== Career ==
=== Leicester City ===
Graham was born in Peterborough and began his career with Leicester City, where he played for eight years in the club's academy.

=== Oxford United ===
Graham joined Oxford United in 2015, where he remained for two seasons, although he didn't play for the club, he did enjoy loan spells at non-league level with Didcot Town and Farnborough.

=== Mansfield Town ===
Graham signed for Mansfield Town in 2017, and was loaned out for the majority of the 2017–18 season at Hednesford Town, where he made 33 appearances and scored ten goals. Graham made his English Football League debut on 4 August 2018 against Newport County.

On 21 January 2019, Graham signed an 18-month contract with Mansfield Town, seeing him contracted to the club until the end of the 2019–20 season. Mansfield Town confirmed their retained list on 18 May 2020, with the club confirming new contract discussions were underway with Graham, but no new contract materialised, and he departed the club at the expiry of his contract.

=== Tamworth ===
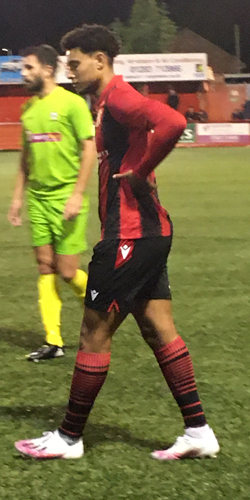
Graham playing for Tamworth in September 2020.

On 19 September 2020, Jordan signed for Southern League Premier Division Central side Tamworth following a successful trial period.

Graham made his debut for Tamworth on 22 September 2020, and had a debut to remember. He came on as a 70th-minute substitute for Lindon Meikle in an FA Cup first round fixture at home to Stourbridge. With Tamworth trailing 2-1 upon Graham's introduction, the score line went to 3–1 in the favour of Stourbridge on the 75th minute, but Graham scored a brace, with goals in the 80th and 89th minute to force the tie to penalties, with Graham converting his spot kick as Tamworth triumphed 5–4 on penalties.

Graham scored his first goal in the Southern League Premier Division Central on 26 September 2020, adding the third goal, as Tamworth defeated St Ives Town 4–2.

Following the curtailment of the 2020–21 season, Graham was not retained by Tamworth.

=== AFC Rushden & Diamonds ===
On 18 March 2022, Graham signed for Southern League Premier Division Central side AFC Rushden & Diamonds.

=== Kettering Town ===
In June 2022, Graham joined National League North club Kettering Town.

=== Spalding United ===
In May 2023, Graham joined Northern Premier League Division One Midlands club Spalding United. During his first season with the club, he helped them win promotion to the Southern League Premier Division Central as champions.

=== Wellingborough Town ===
In October 2024, Graham joined Northern Premier League Division One Midlands side Wellingborough Town.

== Career statistics ==
As of match played 10 September 2024

| Club | Season | League | | | FA Cup | | League Cup | | Other | | Total | |
| Club | Season | Division | Apps | Goals | Apps | Goals | Apps | Goals | Apps | Goals | Apps | Goals |
|---|---|---|---|---|---|---|---|---|---|---|---|---|
| Oxford United | 2015–16 | EFL League Two | 0 | 0 | 0 | 0 | 0 | 0 | 0 | 0 | 0 | 0 |
| Oxford United | 2016–17 | EFL League One | 0 | 0 | 0 | 0 | 0 | 0 | 0 | 0 | 0 | 0 |
| Didcot Town (loan) | 2016–17 | Southern League Division One South & West | 4 | 0 | 0 | 0 | — | | 1 (Note: One appearance in Berks & Bucks Senior Cup) | 0 | 5 | 0 |
| Farnborough (loan) | 2016–17 | Southern League Division One Central | 8 | 0 | 0 | 0 | — | | 0 | 0 | 8 | 0 |
| Mansfield Town | 2017–18 | EFL League Two | 0 | 0 | 0 | 0 | 0 | 0 | 0 | 0 | 0 | 0 |
| Mansfield Town | 2018–19 | EFL League Two | 8 | 0 | 2 | 0 | 1 | 0 | 2 (Note: Two appearances in EFL Trophy) | 0 | 13 | 0 |
| Mansfield Town | 2019–20 | EFL League Two | 0 | 0 | 0 | 0 | 0 | 0 | 1 (Note: One appearance in EFL Trophy) | 0 | 1 | 0 |
| Mansfield Town | Total | | 8 | 0 | 2 | 0 | 1 | 0 | 3 | 0 | 14 | 0 |
| Hednesford Town (loan) | 2017–18 | Northern Premier League Premier Division | 33 | 10 | 0 | 0 | — | | 0 | 0 | 33 | 10 |
| Tamworth | 2020–21 | Southern League Premier Division Central | 4 | 1 | 3 | 2 | — | | 0 | 0 | 7 | 3 |
| AFC Rushden & Diamonds | 2021–22 | Southern League Premier Division Central | 5 | 3 | 0 | 0 | — | | 0 | 0 | 5 | 3 |
| Kettering Town | 2022–23 | National League North | 13 | 1 | 1 | 0 | — | | 0 | 0 | 14 | 1 |
| Spalding United | 2023–24 | Northern Premier League Division One Midlands | 31 | 12 | 3 | 2 | — | | 5 (Note: One appearance and one goal in FA Trophy, four appearances in Lincolnshire Senior Cup) | 1 | 39 | 15 |
| Spalding United | 2024–25 | Southern League Premier Division Central | 6 | 0 | 2 | 0 | — | | 0 | 0 | 8 | 0 |
| Spalding United | Total | | 37 | 12 | 5 | 2 | 0 | 0 | 5 | 1 | 47 | 15 |
| Career total | | | 112 | 27 | 11 | 4 | 1 | 0 | 9 | 1 | 133 | 32 |
