= 2019–20 Mansfield Town F.C. season =

Mansfield Town F.C.
2019–20 season
- Owner: John Radford
- Chief Executive: Carolyn Radford
- Manager: John Dempster (until 14 December); Graham Coughlan (from 17 December)
- Stadium: Field Mill
- League Two: 21st (on PPG)
- FA Cup: Second round
- EFL Cup: First round
- EFL Trophy: Second round
- Top goalscorer: League: Nicky Maynard (14); All: Nicky Maynard (15)
Home colours	Away colours	Third colours

The 2019–20 season was the 123rd season in the history of Mansfield Town and their seventh consecutive season in the League Two. Along with League Two, the club also participated in the FA Cup, EFL Cup, and EFL Trophy.

== Pre-season ==
The Stags announced pre-season friendlies against Swansea City, Bradford (Park Avenue), Alfreton Town, Blackburn Rovers, Hull City, and Nottingham Forest.

6 July 2019 Friendly	Mansfield Town	1–2	Swansea City	Vila Real de Santo António, Portugal
12:00 WEST	Maynard 35'	Report	Routledge 45+3'; McKay 90'	Stadium: Complexo Desportivo

11 July 2019 Friendly	Bradford (Park Avenue)	2–4	Mansfield Town	Bradford
19:30 BST	Thompson 13'; Holmes 74'	Report	Sterling-James 50'; Rose 56'; Maynard 60', 83'	Stadium: Horsfall Stadium; Attendance: 246; Referee: Sam Barrott

13 July 2019 Friendly	Alfreton Town	0–1	Mansfield Town	Alfreton
15:00 BST		Report	Smith 82'	Stadium: Impact Arena; Attendance: 1,054; Referee: Danny Middleton

17 July 2019 Friendly	Mansfield Town	1–3	Blackburn Rovers	Mansfield
19:30 BST	Pearce 53'	Report	Magloire 10'; Buckley 52'; Armstrong 85'	Stadium: Field Mill; Attendance: 1,701; Referee: John Brooks

20 July 2019 Friendly	Mansfield Town	2–2	Hull City	Mansfield
15:00 BST	Bishop 44'; Hamilton 54'	Report	Bowen 27'; Dicko 46'	Stadium: Field Mill; Attendance: 1,799; Referee: Michael Salisbury

23 July 2019 Friendly	Mansfield Town	2–1	Nottingham Forest	Mansfield
19:45 BST	Stewart 33' (o.g.); Maynard 84'	Report	Cummings 10'	Stadium: Field Mill; Attendance: 3,202; Referee: David Coote

27 July 2019 Friendly	Mansfield Town	4–2	Rangers U20s	Mansfield
13:00 BST	Cook; Mellis; Rose; Khan	Report	Houston; Stewart	Stadium: Field Mill; Attendance: 1,063; Referee: Declan Bourne

== Competitions ==
=== League Two ===
==== League table ====
Pos	Team	Pld	W	D	L	GF	GA	GD	Pts	PPG	Promotion, qualification or relegation
17	Leyton Orient	36	10	12	14	47	55	−8	42	1.17	
18	Carlisle United	37	10	12	15	39	56	−17	42	1.14	
19	Oldham Athletic	37	9	14	14	44	57	−13	41	1.11	
20	Scunthorpe United	37	10	10	17	44	56	−12	40	1.08	
21	Mansfield Town	36	9	11	16	48	55	−7	38	1.06	
22	Morecambe	37	7	11	19	35	60	−25	32	0.86	
23	Stevenage	36	3	13	20	24	50	−26	22	0.61	Reprieved from relegation (Note: As a result of Bury's expulsion from League One, only one team is relegated to maintain League Two at 24 teams.)
24	Macclesfield Town (R)	37	7	15	15	32	47	−15	19 (Note: Macclesfield Town were deducted a total of 17 points for various infractions. They were deducted six points for failing to both pay their players' wages and to fulfil a fixture, reduced to four points after appeal. A further seven-point deduction was given for failing to play December's match against Plymouth Argyle. A further two-point deduction was given for breaches of regulations over non-payment of wages. On 3 July the EFL appealed against the independent disciplinary panel's sanctions, and a further four points were deducted on 11 August 2020, resulting in Macclesfield Town being relegated.)	0.51	Relegation to the National League

Source: EFL Official Website
Rules for classification: 1) Points per game; 2) Goal difference; 3) Number of goals scored; 4) Head-to-head results; 5) Wins; 6) Away goals; 7) Penalty points (sec 9.5); 8) 12-point sending off offences
(R) Relegated

==== Results summary ====
Overall								Home						Away					
Pld	W	D	L	GF	GA	GD	Pts	W	D	L	GF	GA	GD	W	D	L	GF	GA	GD
36	9	11	16	48	55	−7	38	4	5	8	27	29	−2	5	6	8	21	26	−5

Last updated: 7 March 2020.
Source: BBC

==== Results by matchday ====
Matchday	1	2	3	4	5	6	7	8	9	10	11	12	13	14	15	16	17	18	19	20	21	22	23	24	25	26	27	28	29	30	31	32	33	34	35	36
Ground	A	H	A	H	H	A	H	A	H	A	H	A	H	A	H	A	H	A	A	H	A	H	H	A	A	H	H	A	H	A	H	A	A	H	A	A
Result	D	D	W	L	D	L	W	L	L	D	L	W	W	D	L	W	L	D	L	L	D	D	D	L	W	L	L	L	W	L	D	D	L	W	L	W
Position	10	14	8	13	14	19	12	16	18	20	20	19	15	17	18	14	14	14	15	18	18	17	19	20	17	18	18	19	18	21	21	21	21	20	21	21

Updated to match(es) played on 7 March 2020. Source: Statto.com
A = Away; H = Home; W = Win; D = Draw; L = Loss

==== Matches ====
On Thursday, 20 June 2019, the EFL League Two fixtures were revealed.

3 August 2019 1	Newport County	2–2	Mansfield Town	Newport
15:00 BST	Labadie 7' (yellow card) 14'; Amond 34' (pen.) (yellow card) 83'	Report	Sweeney (yellow card) 18'; Benning (yellow card) 31'; Pearce 47' (yellow card) 74'; Rose 49' (yellow card) 81'; Khan (yellow card) 54'; Mellis (red card) 68'	Stadium: Rodney Parade; Attendance: 4,481; Referee: James Adcock

10 August 2019 2	Mansfield Town	2–2	Morecambe	Mansfield
15:00 BST	Preston (yellow card) 36' (yellow-red card) 82'; Maynard 39'; Rose 72'; Cook (yellow card) 90+3'	Report	Lavelle 4'; Alessandra 21'; Tutte (yellow card) 28'; Buxton (yellow card) 50'	Stadium: Field Mill; Attendance: 4,465; Referee: Christopher Pollard

17 August 2019 3	Carlisle United	0–2	Mansfield Town	Carlisle
15:00 BST	Webster (yellow card) 79'	Report	Rose 29'; Maynard 45+4'; Sweeney (yellow card) 67'; White (yellow card) 79'; Tomlinson (yellow card) 88'	Stadium: Brunton Park; Attendance: 4,576; Referee: Carl Boyeson

20 August 2019 4	Mansfield Town	2–3	Leyton Orient	Mansfield
19:45 BST	Rose 12' (pen.), 29' (pen.); White (yellow card) 84'	Report	Wilkinson 64'; Angol 78'; Gorman (yellow card) 90+5'; Maguire-Drew 90+6'; Dennis (yellow card) 90+7'	Stadium: Field Mill; Attendance: 4,128; Referee: Seb Stockbridge

24 August 2019 5	Mansfield Town	0–0	Stevenage	Mansfield
15:00 BST		Report	Husin (yellow card) 37'; Stokes (yellow card) 85'	Stadium: Field Mill; Attendance: 3,982; Referee: Marc Edwards

31 August 2019 6	Exeter City	1–0	Mansfield Town	Exeter
15:00 BST	Bowman 5' (yellow card) 26'; Sparkes (yellow card) 84'	Report	Tomlinson (yellow card) 28'; Sweeney (red card) 86'	Stadium: St James Park; Attendance: 4,316; Referee: Nick Kinseley

7 September 2019 7	Mansfield Town	2–0	Scunthorpe United	Mansfield
15:00 BST	Preston 31'; Rose 54'; Gordon (yellow card) 69'	Report	Eisa (yellow card) 19'; Clarke (yellow card) 57'; Butler (yellow card) 60' van Veen (yellow card) 85'	Stadium: One Call Stadium; Attendance: 4,772; Referee: John Busby

14 September 2019 8	Crawley Town	1–0	Mansfield Town	Crawley
15:00 BST	Doherty (yellow card) 16'; Lubala (penalty missed) 26' 53'; Sendles-White (yellow card) 74'	Report	Sweeney (yellow card) 48'	Stadium: The People's Pension Stadium; Attendance: 2,068; Referee: Scott Oldham

17 September 2019 9	Mansfield Town	0–4	Cambridge United	Mansfield
19:45 BST	Preston (red card) 49'; Gordon (yellow card) 58'; Rose (yellow card) 71'	Report	Knoyle (yellow card) 10'; Darling (yellow card) 45+1'; Dunk (yellow card) 61'; Roles 74'; Smith 86'; Maris 90'; Lambe 90+5' (pen.)	Stadium: One Call Stadium; Attendance: 3,567; Referee: Darren Handley

21 September 2019 10	Port Vale	2–2	Mansfield Town	Burslem
15:00 BST	Gibbons (yellow card) 24'; Pope (yellow card) 26'; Cullen 45+4'; Legge (yellow card) 77'; Bennett (yellow card) 87'; Smith 90+4'	Report	Gordon 14'; Rose (yellow card) 33' (goal) 75' (pen.); Benning (yellow card) 66'; White (yellow card) 87'	Stadium: Vale Park; Attendance: 5,109; Referee: Joshua Smith

28 September 2019 11	Mansfield Town	0–1	Plymouth Argyle	Mansfield
15:00 BST	Gordon (yellow card) 45+3'	Report	Grant 13'; Wootton (yellow card) 21'; Sawyer (yellow card) 30'; Aimson (yellow card) 44'; McFadzean (yellow card) 50'; Sarcevic (yellow card) 52'; Lolos (yellow card) 75'	Stadium: One Call Stadium; Attendance: 4,499; Referee: Anthony Backhouse

5 October 2019 12	Grimsby Town	0–1	Mansfield Town	Cleethorpes
15:00 BST	Cook (yellow card) 42'; Green (yellow card) 69'; Hendrie (yellow card) 90+5'	Report	Bishop (yellow card) 58'; White (red card) 60'; Pearce 90+6'	Stadium: Blundell Park; Attendance: 5,087; Referee: Paul Marsden

12 October 2019 13	Mansfield Town	6–1	Oldham Athletic	Mansfield
15:00 BST	Maynard 31', 34', 45+4'; Wheater 56' (o.g.); Pearce (yellow card) 65'; Afolayan 66'; Knowles 83' (pen.); Sweeney (yellow card) 90+2'	Report	Morais (yellow card) 33' (yellow-red card) 38'; Egert (red card) 37'; Hamer 43'	Stadium: One Call Stadium; Attendance: 4,368; Referee: Lee Swabey

19 October 2019 14	Forest Green Rovers	2–2	Mansfield Town	Nailsworth
15:00 BST	Bernard (yellow card) 1'; Collins 30'; Adams (yellow card) 34'; Aitchison 61'; Mills (yellow card) 86'	Report	Shaughnessy (yellow card) 19'; Gordon (yellow card) 28'; Cook 63', 74'; Benning (yellow card) 73'; Bishop (yellow card) 90+5'	Stadium: The New Lawn; Attendance: 2,276; Referee: Oliver Yates

22 October 2019 15	Mansfield Town	1–2	Salford City	Mansfield
19:45 BST	Maynard 77'; Bishop (yellow card) 90+4'	Report	Jervis 48'; Jones (yellow card) 53'; Rooney 65'; Touray (yellow card) 86'	Stadium: One Call Stadium; Attendance: 4,170; Referee: Neil Hair

26 October 2019 16	Walsall	1–2	Mansfield Town	Bescot
15:00 BST	Sinclair (yellow card) 37'; Adebayo 45'	Report	MacDonald (yellow card) 17' (goal) 68'; Cook 30'	Stadium: Banks's Stadium; Attendance: 4,521; Referee: Andy Haines

2 November 2019 17	Mansfield Town	2–3	Colchester United	Mansfield
15:00 GMT	Sweeney 45'; Bishop (yellow card) 66'; Sterling-James 90'	Report	Comley 8'; Nouble (penalty missed) 48'; Senior 74'; Bramall (yellow card) 80'; Gambin 87'	Stadium: One Call Stadium; Attendance: 4,125; Referee: Sebastian Stockbridge

16 November 2019 18	Macclesfield Town	0–0	Mansfield Town	Macclesfield
15:00 GMT	Stephens (yellow card) 55'; Fitzpatrick (yellow card) 65'	Report	Preston (yellow card) 19'; Benning (yellow card) 21'	Stadium: Moss Rose Ground; Attendance: 2,055; Referee: Chris Sarginson

23 November 2019 19	Swindon Town	1–0	Mansfield Town	Swindon
15:00 GMT	Doyle 23'	Report	Preston (yellow card) 15'; Smith (yellow card) 27'	Stadium: County Ground; Attendance: 6,741; Referee: Nick Kinseley

7 December 2019 20	Mansfield Town	0–3	Cheltenham Town	Mansfield
15:00 GMT	MacDonald (yellow card) 25'; Maynard (yellow card) 65'	Report	Doyle-Hayes (yellow card) 23'; Smith 32'; Greaves (yellow card) 38'; Boyle 52' (yellow card) 65'; Addai 86'	Stadium: One Call Stadium; Attendance: 3,715; Referee: Sam Purkiss

14 December 2019 21	Crewe Alexandra	1–1	Mansfield Town	Crewe
15:00 GMT	Anene 8'	Report	Cook 27'; MacDonald (yellow card) 83'; Preston (yellow card) 84'	Stadium: Alexandra Stadium; Attendance: 4,060; Referee: Kevin Johnson

21 December 2019 22	Mansfield Town	1–1	Northampton Town	Mansfield
15:00 GMT	Clarke (yellow card) 36'; Benning (yellow card) 59'; Cook (yellow card) 72' (goal) 74'; Bishop (yellow card) 90+4'; Preston (yellow card) 90+7'	Report	McCormack (yellow card) 12'; Turnbull (yellow card) 38'; Anderson (yellow card) 56'; Watson (yellow card) 56'; Smith 84'	Stadium: One Call Stadium; Attendance: 4,496; Referee: Alan Young

26 December 2019 23	Mansfield Town	2–2	Port Vale	Mansfield
15:00 GMT	Clarke (yellow card) 19'; Maynard 81'; Hamilton 90+3'	Report	Montaño (yellow card) 14'; Smith 53'; Legge 66'	Stadium: One Call Stadium; Attendance: 5,565; Referee: Martin Coy

29 December 2019 24	Bradford City	2–0	Mansfield Town	Bradford
15:00 GMT	Henley (yellow card) 11'; Vaughan 13' (pen.), 83' (pen.) (yellow card) 70'; Connolly (yellow card) 63'	Report	Sweeney (yellow card) 28'; Rose (yellow card) 40'; Pearce (yellow card) 48'; Tomlinson (yellow card) 61'; Clarke (yellow card) 79'; Preston (yellow card) 90+5'	Stadium: Northern Commercials Stadium; Attendance: 15,197; Referee: Ross Joyce

1 January 2020 25	Cambridge United	2–3	Mansfield Town	Cambridge
15:00 GMT	Knibbs 3'; Taylor 44'; Lambe (yellow card) 57' (yellow-red card) 59'; Roles (yellow card) 90+1'	Report	Maynard 36', 71', 81'; Mellis (yellow card) 90+6'	Stadium: Abbey Stadium; Attendance: 3,848; Referee: Neil Hair

4 January 2020 26	Mansfield Town	0–1	Grimsby Town	Mansfield
15:00 GMT	White (yellow card) 31'; Pearce (yellow card) 45+3'; Davies (yellow card) 90+1'	Report	Waterfall (red card) 10'; Benning 66' (o.g.); McKeown (yellow card) 67'; Gibson (yellow card) 77'	Stadium: One Call Stadium; Attendance: 5,848; Referee: James Oldham

11 January 2020 27	Mansfield Town	3–4	Forest Green Rovers	Mansfield
15:00 GMT	Hamilton 3'; Rose 40'; Maynard 90+1'	Report	Rawson 45+5', 52'; Winchester 60'; Mills (yellow card) 80'; Adams (yellow card) 88'; Collins 90+6'	Stadium: One Call Stadium; Attendance: 3,956; Referee: Graham Salisbury

18 January 2020 28	Plymouth Argyle	3–1	Mansfield Town	Plymouth
15:00 GMT	Canavan 43'; Sarcevic 61' (pen.); Cooper (yellow card) 81'; Hardie 90+1'	Report	Hamilton (yellow card) 36'; Sweeney (yellow card) 54'; Cook 66'	Stadium: Home Park; Attendance: 10,523; Referee: Trevor Kettle

25 January 2020 29	Mansfield Town	3–0	Bradford City	Mansfield
15:00 GMT	Rose 7'; Maynard 43'; Cook 77'; Benning (yellow card) 89'	Report	Reeves (yellow card) 22'; McCartan (yellow card) 40'	Stadium: One Call Stadium; Attendance: 5,537; Referee: Will Finnie

28 January 2020 30	Oldham Athletic	3–1	Mansfield Town	Oldham
19:45 GMT	Smith 23'; Hamer 43'; Nepomuceno 58'	Report	Riley (yellow card) 16'; Pearce (yellow card) 70'; Khan 90+3'	Stadium: Boundary Park; Attendance: 2,961; Referee: Michael Salisbury

1 February 2020 31	Mansfield Town	2–2	Carlisle United	Mansfield
15:00 GMT	Maynard 58', 72'	Report	Thomas (yellow card) 62'; Watt 81' (yellow card) 83'; Kayode 90+2'	Stadium: One Call Stadium; Attendance: 4,272; Referee: Jarred Gillett

8 February 2020 32	Morecambe	1–1	Mansfield Town	Morecambe
15:00 GMT	Kenyon 86'	Report	Watts (yellow card) 50'; Riley 60'	Stadium: Globe Arena; Attendance: 1,965; Referee: Scott Oldham

11 February 2020 33	Leyton Orient	2–1	Mansfield Town	Leyton
19:45 GMT	Dayton 45'; Marsh (yellow card) 67'; Benning 74' (o.g.); Brophy (yellow card) 82'	Report	Watts 60'; Sweeney (yellow card) 64'	Stadium: Breyer Group Stadium; Attendance: 3,587; Referee: Josh Smith

15 February 2020 34	Mansfield Town	1–0	Newport County	Mansfield
15:00 GMT	Rose 29' (yellow card) 87'; Charsley (yellow card) 72'	Report	Inniss (yellow card) 49'; Dolan (yellow card) 82'	Stadium: One Call Stadium; Attendance: 3,653; Referee: Dean Whitestone

22 February 2020 35	Cheltenham Town	1–0	Mansfield Town	Cheltenham
15:00 GMT	Nichols (yellow card) 32'; Reid 65'; May (yellow card) 90'; Doyle-Hayes (yellow card) 90+1'	Report		Stadium: Jonny-Rocks Stadium; Attendance: 3,274; Referee: John Busby

29 February 2020	Mansfield Town	v	Swindon Town	Mansfield
15:00 GMT		Report		Stadium: One Call Stadium
Note: Match was postponed due to a waterlogged pitch.

7 March 2020 36	Northampton Town	1–2	Mansfield Town	Northampton
15:00 GMT	Hoskins (red card) 10'; Goode (yellow card) 31'; Oliver (yellow card) 54'; McCormack (yellow card) 62'; Smith (yellow card) 62' (goal) 90+5'; Adams (yellow card) 90+3'	Report	Rose 12' (pen.); Tomlinson (yellow card) 31' (goal) 74'	Stadium: PTS Academy Stadium; Attendance: 5,666; Referee: Peter Wright

14 March 2020	Mansfield Town	v	Crewe Alexandra	Mansfield
15:00 GMT				Stadium: One Call Stadium
Note: Season was suspended until 3 April 2020, due to the COVID-19 pandemic.

17 March 2020	Salford City	v	Mansfield Town	Salford
19:45 GMT				Stadium: Peninsula Stadium
Note: Season was suspended until 3 April 2020, due to the COVID-19 pandemic.

21 March 2020	Mansfield Town	v	Walsall	Mansfield
15:00 GMT				Stadium: One Call Stadium
Note: Season was suspended until 3 April 2020, due to the COVID-19 pandemic.

28 March 2020	Colchester United	v	Mansfield Town	Colchester
15:00 GMT				Stadium: JobServe Community Stadium
Note: Season was suspended until 3 April 2020, due to the COVID-19 pandemic.

4 April 2020	Mansfield Town	v	Macclesfield Town	Mansfield
15:00 BST				Stadium: One Call Stadium
Note: On 3 April, the English Football League decided to postpone all football until safe to do so due to the COVID-19 pandemic.

10 April 2020	Stevenage	v	Mansfield Town	Stevenage
15:00 BST				Stadium: The Lamex Stadium
Note: On 3 April, the English Football League decided to postpone all football until safe to do so due to the COVID-19 pandemic.

13 April 2020	Mansfield Town	v	Exeter City	Mansfield
13:00 BST				Stadium: One Call Stadium
Note: On 3 April, the English Football League decided to postpone all football until safe to do so due to the COVID-19 pandemic.

18 April 2020	Scunthorpe United	v	Mansfield Town	Scunthorpe
15:00 BST				Stadium: Sands Venue Stadium
Note: On 3 April, the English Football League decided to postpone all football until safe to do so due to the COVID-19 pandemic.

25 April 2020	Mansfield Town	v	Crawley Town	Mansfield
15:00 BST				Stadium: One Call Stadium
Note: On 3 April, the English Football League decided to postpone all football until safe to do so due to the COVID-19 pandemic.

=== FA Cup ===
The first round draw was made on 21 October 2019. The second round draw was made live on 11 November from Chichester City's stadium, Oaklands Park.≥

9 November 2019 First round	Mansfield Town	1–0	Chorley	Mansfield
15:00 BST	Maynard 81'	Report		Stadium: One Call Stadium; Attendance: 2,418; Referee: Savvas Yianni

30 November 2019 Second round	Shrewsbury Town	2–0	Mansfield Town	Shrewsbury
15:00 GMT	Golbourne (yellow card) 25'; Pierre (yellow card) 39'; Norburn (red card) 60'; Udoh 88'; Walker 90+5'	Report	Shaughnessy (yellow card) 18'; Preston (yellow card) 34'	Stadium: Montgomery Waters Meadow; Attendance: 3,678; Referee: Andy Haines

=== EFL Cup ===
The first round draw was made on 20 June.

13 August 2019 First round	Mansfield Town	2–2 (5–6 p)	Morecambe	Mansfield
19:45 BST	Smith (yellow card) 5'; Pearce 57'; Sterling-James 68'; Rose (yellow card) 81'	Report	Oates (yellow card) 7'; Old 18', 59'; Conlan (red card) 22'; Tanner (yellow card) 32'; Halstead (yellow card) 79'	Stadium: Field Mill; Attendance: 1,884; Referee: Rob Lewis
	Penalties
	Khan (penalty missed); Sterling-James (penalty missed); Benning (penalty scored); Rose (penalty scored); Pearce (penalty scored); Tomlinson (penalty scored); Smith (penalty scored); Sweeney (penalty missed)		Miller (penalty missed); Cranston (penalty scored); O'Sullivan (penalty scored); Lavelle (penalty missed); Buxton (penalty scored); Kenyon (penalty scored); Brewitt (penalty scored); Old (penalty scored)

=== EFL Trophy ===
On 9 July 2019, the pre-determined group stage draw was announced with Invited clubs to be drawn on 12 July 2019. The draw for the second round was made on 16 November 2019 live on Sky Sports.

Pos	Div	Team	Pld	W	PW	PL	L	GF	GA	GD	Pts	Qualification
1	ACA	Everton U21	3	1	1	1	0	5	3	+2	6	Advance to Round 2
2	L2	Mansfield Town	3	1	0	2	0	4	3	+1	5	Advance to Round 2
3	L2	Crewe Alexandra	3	0	2	0	1	4	6	−2	4	
4	L1	Burton Albion	3	1	0	0	2	4	5	−1	3	

Source: EFL.com

27 August 2019 Group stage	Mansfield Town	1–1 (1–4 p)	Everton U21	Mansfield
19:45 BST	Gibbens (yellow card) 44'; Preston (yellow card) 67'; Mellis (yellow card) 82'; Sterling-James 87'	Report	Gordon 28'; Baningime (yellow card) 54' (yellow-red card) 70'	Stadium: One Call Stadium; Attendance: 824; Referee: Ben Toner
	Penalties
	Hamilton (penalty scored); Khan (penalty missed); Sterling-James (penalty missed)		Evans (penalty scored); Foulds (penalty scored); Charsley (penalty scored); Markelo (penalty scored)

8 October 2019 Group stage	Mansfield Town	1–1 (3–4 p)	Crewe Alexandra	Mansfield
19:45 BST	Knowles 18'; Cook (yellow card) 27'	Report	Johnson (yellow card) 30'; Finney 45' (yellow card) 87'	Stadium: One Call Stadium; Attendance: 800; Referee: James Oldham
	Penalties
	Hamilton (penalty scored); Cook (penalty missed); Afolayan (penalty scored); Smith (penalty missed); Benning (penalty scored)		Ng (penalty missed); Jones (penalty scored); Pickering (penalty scored); Finney (penalty scored); Kirk (penalty scored)

12 November 2019 Group stage	Burton Albion	1–2	Mansfield Town	Burton upon Trent
19:45 GMT	Templeton 35'; Buxton (yellow card) 37'; Fraser (yellow card) 52'; Anderson (yellow card) 72'; Quinn (yellow card) 74'	Report	Rose 23' (yellow card) 53'; Sweeney 34'; Preston (yellow card) 47'; Clarke (yellow card) 87'	Stadium: Pirelli Stadium; Attendance: 485; Referee: Leigh Doughty

3 December 2019 Second round	Port Vale	2–2 (4–2 p)	Mansfield Town	Burslem
19:45 GMT	Browne 64'; Taylor 82'	Report	Bishop (yellow card) 43'; Hamilton 50'; Benning (yellow card) 55'; Sterling-James 90+2'	Stadium: Vale Park; Attendance: 1,164; Referee: Marc Edwards
	Penalties
	Joyce (penalty scored); Taylor (penalty scored); Burgess (penalty scored); Atkinson (penalty scored)		Hamilton (penalty missed); Mellis (penalty scored); Benning (penalty missed); Knowles (penalty scored)

== Transfers ==
=== Transfers in ===
Date	Position	Nationality	Name	From	Fee	Ref.
1 July 2019	CB	(Republic of Ireland)	James Clarke	(England) Burnley	Free transfer	
1 July 2019	CF	(England)	Andy Cook	(England) Walsall	Undisclosed	
1 July 2019	GK	(England)	Aiden Stone	(England) Burnley	Free transfer	
2 July 2019	CF	(England)	Nicky Maynard	(England) Bury	Free transfer	
9 July 2019	CM	(Wales)	Dion Donohue	(England) Portsmouth	Free transfer	
25 July 2019	RM	(England)	Kellan Gordon	(England) Derby County	Free transfer	
18 January 2020	CM	(Republic of Ireland)	Harry Charsley	(England) Everton	Free transfer	
25 January 2020	RB	(England)	Joe Riley	(England) Plymouth Argyle	Free transfer	

=== Loans in ===
Date from	Position	Nationality	Name	From	Date until	Ref.
29 August 2019	CF	(England)	Oladapo Afolayan	(England) West Ham United	January 2020	
2 September 2019	CB	(Republic of Ireland)	Conor Shaughnessy	(England) Leeds United	13 January 2020	
28 January 2020	CB	(England)	Kelland Watts	(England) Newcastle United	30 April 2020	
31 January 2020	CM	(Wales)	Jack Evans	(Wales) Swansea City	30 June 2020	

=== Loans out ===
Date from	Position	Nationality	Name	To	Date until	Ref.
16 August 2019	CB	(England)	Jamie Chisholm	(England) Tamworth	September 2019	
30 August 2019	MF	(England)	Tyrese Sinclair	(England) Radcliffe	September 2019	
13 September 2019	CB	(England)	Lewis Gibbens	(England) Boston United	December 2019	
3 October 2019	CF	(England)	Jason Law	(England) Leek Town	Youth loan	
1 December 2019	GK	(England)	Aidan Stone	(England) Widnes	January 2020	
24 January 2020	GK	(Republic of Ireland)	Conrad Logan	(England) Forest Green Rovers	30 June 2020	
31 January 2020	LW	(England)	Otis Khan	(Wales) Newport County	30 June 2020	
31 January 2020	AM	(England)	Alistair Smith	(England) Kettering Town	29 February 2020	
6 March 2020	RM	(Saint Kitts and Nevis)	Omari Sterling-James	(England) Kettering Town	25 April 2020	

=== Transfers out ===
Date	Position	Nationality	Name	To	Fee	Ref.
1 July 2019	CM	(England)	Will Atkinson	(England) Port Vale	Released	
1 July 2019	MF	(England)	Harry Bircumshaw	Free agent	Released	
1 July 2019	RB	(England)	Nyle Blake	Free agent	Released	
1 July 2019	RB	(England)	Teddy Bloor	Free agent	Released	
1 July 2019	CF	(England)	Iyrwah Gooden	Free agent	Released	
1 July 2019	CF	(Antigua and Barbuda)	Zayn Hakeem	(England) Bradford (Park Avenue)	Released	
1 July 2019	CM	(England)	Cameron Healey	Free agent	Released	
1 July 2019	GK	(England)	Keaton Marrs	Free agent	Released	
1 July 2019	CB	(England)	David Mirfin	Retired		
1 July 2019	LB	(England)	Henri Wilder	(England) Tamworth	Released	
1 August 2019	CB	(England)	Ben Turner	(England) Notts County	Free transfer	
2 September 2019	LB	(Wales)	Dion Donohue	(England) Swindon Town	Contract terminated	
31 January 2020	CF	(England)	Andy Cook	(England) Tranmere Rovers	Undisclosed	
31 January 2020	CM	(England)	Jacob Mellis	(England) Bolton Wanderers	Mutual consent	
