= 2018–19 Mansfield Town F.C. season =

Mansfield Town
2018–19 season
- Owner: John Radford
- Chief Executive: Carolyn Radford
- Manager: David Flitcroft
- Stadium: Field Mill
- League Two: 4th
- FA Cup: First round (Vs. Charlton Athletic)
- EFL Cup: Second round (Vs. West Bromwich Albion)
- EFL Trophy: Second round (Vs. Bury)
- Top goalscorer: League: Walker (22); All: Walker (26)
- Highest home attendance: 7,361 (vs. Newport County, 12 May 2019)
- Lowest home attendance: 928 (vs. Scunthorpe United, 13 November 2018)
- Average home league attendance: 4,897

The 2018–19 season was Mansfield Town's 122nd season in their history and their sixth consecutive season in League Two.

== Competitions ==
=== Friendlies ===
Mansfield Town announced they will compete with Vitória, Bradford Park Avenue, Derby County, Sheffield United, Sheffield Wednesday and Rotherham United during pre-season.

7 July 2018 Friendly	Vitória	1–0	Mansfield Town	Albufeira, Portugal
11:15 BST	77'	Report		Stadium: Guia Stadium

12 July 2018 Friendly	Bradford Park Avenue	0–3	Mansfield Town	Bradford
19:45 BST		Report	Mellis 49'; Angol 53', 79'	Stadium: Horsfall Stadium; Attendance: 165; Referee: James Bell

18 July 2018 Friendly	Mansfield Town	3–1	Derby County	Mansfield
19:30 BST	Graham 65'; Angol 78' (pen.); Hamilton 80'	Report	Bennett 69'	Stadium: One Call Stadium; Attendance: 4,058; Referee: Ross Joyce

21 July 2018 Friendly	Mansfield Town	0–0	Sheffield United	Mansfield
15:00 BST		Report		Stadium: One Call Stadium; Attendance: 3,271; Referee: Mark Heywood

24 July 2018 Friendly	Mansfield Town	2–1	Sheffield Wednesday	Mansfield
19:30 BST	Benning 41'; Reach 67' (o.g.)	Report	Reach 72'	Stadium: One Call Stadium; Attendance: 3,599; Referee: John Brooks

28 July 2018 Friendly	Mansfield Town	2–1	Rotherham United	Mansfield
15:00 BST	Davies; Walker	Report	Raggett	Stadium: One Call Stadium; Attendance: 2,083; Referee: Darren England

=== League Two ===
==== League table ====
Pos	Team	Pld	W	D	L	GF	GA	GD	Pts	Promotion, qualification or relegation
2	Bury (P)	46	22	13	11	82	56	+26	79	Promotion to EFL League One
3	Milton Keynes Dons (P)	46	23	10	13	71	49	+22	79	Promotion to EFL League One
4	Mansfield Town	46	20	16	10	69	41	+28	76	Qualification for League Two play-offs (Note: Four teams play for one spot and promotion to EFL League One.)
5	Forest Green Rovers	46	20	14	12	68	47	+21	74	Qualification for League Two play-offs
6	Tranmere Rovers (O, P)	46	20	13	13	63	50	+13	73	Qualification for League Two play-offs

Source: EFL Official Website
Rules for classification: 1) Points; 2) Goal difference; 3) Number of goals scored; 4) Head-to-head results
(O) Play-off winners; (P) Promoted

==== Results summary ====
Overall								Home						Away					
Pld	W	D	L	GF	GA	GD	Pts	W	D	L	GF	GA	GD	W	D	L	GF	GA	GD
46	20	16	10	69	41	+28	76	14	5	4	39	15	+24	6	11	6	30	26	+4

Last updated: 4 May 2019.
Source: BBC

==== Results by matchday ====
Matchday	1	2	3	4	5	6	7	8	9	10	11	12	13	14	15	16	17	18	19	20	21	22	23	24	25	26	27	28	29	30	31	32	33	34	35	36	37	38	39	40	41	42	43	44	45	46
Ground	H	A	H	A	A	H	H	A	H	H	A	A	A	H	A	A	H	H	A	H	A	H	H	A	A	H	H	A	H	A	H	A	A	H	H	A	A	H	H	A	H	A	H	A	H	A
Result	W	D	D	D	D	W	L	D	W	D	D	D	W	D	W	D	W	W	D	W	W	W	D	W	L	L	W	W	W	D	W	L	L	W	W	L	D	D	L	W	W	D	W	L	L	L
Position	3	5	8	10	13	8	15	16	14	15	14	13	11	11	9	10	7	5	5	5	5	3	3	3	4	5	3	3	2	2	2	2	3	3	3	4	3	3	4	4	2	3	2	3	3	4

Updated to match(es) played on 4 May 2019. Source: Statto.com
A = Away; H = Home; W = Win; D = Draw; L = Loss

==== Matches ====
On 21 June 2018, the League Two fixtures for the forthcoming season were announced.

4 August 2018 1	Mansfield Town	3–0	Newport County	Mansfield
15:00 BST	Walker 12'; Khan 56', 64'	Report		Stadium: Field Mill; Attendance: 4,423; Referee: Paul Marsden

11 August 2018 2	Yeovil Town	2–2	Mansfield Town	Yeovil
15:00 BST	Jaiyesimi 6'; Arquin 17'	Report	Davies 9'; Preston 26'	Stadium: Huish Park; Attendance: 2,796; Referee: Neil Hair

18 August 2018 3	Mansfield Town	1–1	Colchester United	Mansfield
15:00 BST	Davies 81'	Report	Szmodics 90+5'	Stadium: Field Mill; Attendance: 3,909; Referee: Michael Salisbury

21 August 2018 4	Tranmere Rovers	0–0	Mansfield Town	Birkenhead
19:45 BST		Report		Stadium: Prenton Park; Attendance: 5,466; Referee: Thomas Bramall

25 August 2018 5	Macclesfield Town	1–1	Mansfield Town	Macclesfield
15:00 BST	Smith 63'	Report	Benning 32'	Stadium: Moss Rose; Attendance: 2,624; Referee: Anthony Backhouse

1 September 2018 6	Mansfield Town	1–0	Carlisle United	Mansfield
15:00 BST	Walker 55' (pen.)	Report		Stadium: Field Mill; Attendance: 4,470; Referee: Darren Drysdale

15 September 2018 7	Mansfield Town	1–2	Exeter City	Mansfield
15:00 BST	Walker 61'	Report	Moxey 31'; Law 57'	Stadium: Field Mill; Attendance: 4,443; Referee: Andy Haines

22 September 2018 8	Cambridge United	1–1	Mansfield Town	Cambridge
15:00 BST	Maris 88'	Report	Rose 26'	Stadium: Abbey Stadium; Attendance: 3,909; Referee: Nick Kinseley

29 September 2018 9	Mansfield Town	4–0	Northampton Town	Mansfield
15:00 BST	Elšnik 5'; Rose 57', 86'; Hamilton 81'	Report		Stadium: Field Mill; Attendance: 4,550; Referee: Trevor Kettle

2 October 2018 10	Mansfield Town	0–0	Oldham Athletic	Mansfield
19:45 BST		Report		Stadium: Field Mill; Attendance: 3,892; Referee: Thomas Bramall

6 October 2018 11	Bury	2–2	Mansfield Town	Bury
15:00 BST	O'Shea (yellow card) 50'; Maynard 56', 90+5'	Report	Rose 10', (yellow card) 13'; Preston 73'; Sweeney (yellow card) 39'; Bishop (yellow card) 23'; Walker (yellow card) 45'	Stadium: Gigg Lane; Attendance: 3,880; Referee: Scott Oldham

20 October 2018 12	Swindon Town	0–0	Mansfield Town	Swindon
15:00 BST		Report	Atkinson (red card) 43'	Stadium: County Ground; Attendance: 6,208; Referee: Antony Coggins

23 October 2018 13	Morecambe	0–1	Mansfield Town	Morecambe
19:45 BST		Report	Bishop 36'	Stadium: Globe Arena; Attendance: 1,355; Referee: Robert Lewis

27 October 2018 14	Mansfield Town	1–1	Milton Keynes Dons	Mansfield
15:00 BST	Sweeney (yellow card) 13'; Mellis 17'; Benning (yellow card) 52'	Report	Houghton 24'; Brittain (yellow card) 81'; Aneke (yellow card) 85'; Watson (yellow card) 90'	Stadium: Field Mill; Attendance: 4,329; Referee: Seb Stockbridge

30 October 2018 15	Crewe Alexandra	0–3	Mansfield Town	Crewe
19:45 GMT		Report	Elšnik 8', 35'; Walker 61'	Stadium: Gresty Road; Attendance: 2,973; Referee: Chris Sarginson

3 November 2018 16	Cheltenham Town	2–2	Mansfield Town	Cheltenham
15:00 GMT	Tozer 10'; Boyle 45'	Report	Walker 7', 90+3'	Stadium: Whaddon Road; Attendance: 2,828; Referee: Neil Hair

6 November 2018 17	Mansfield Town	2–1	Grimsby Town	Mansfield
19:45 GMT	Walker 50', 82'	Report	Benning 36' (o.g.)	Stadium: Field Mill; Attendance: 4,118; Referee: Keith Stroud

17 November 2018 18	Mansfield Town	1–0	Port Vale	Mansfield
15:00 GMT	Hamilton 41'	Report	Oyeleke (red card) 64'	Stadium: Field Mill; Attendance: 4,316; Referee: Martin Coy

24 November 2018 19	Lincoln City	1–1	Mansfield Town	Lincoln
13:00 GMT	Gordon 85'	Report	Mellis 90+3'	Stadium: Sincil Bank; Referee: Gavin Ward

8 December 2018 20	Mansfield Town	2–0	Notts County	Mansfield
13:00 GMT	Hamilton 37', 63'	Report		Stadium: Field Mill; Attendance: 6,604; Referee: Jeremy Simpson

22 December 2018 21	Stevenage	1–3	Mansfield Town	Stevenage
15:00 GMT	Newton 45+2'; Iontton (yellow card) 66'	Report	Preston (yellow card) 19'; Mellis (yellow card) 50'; Sweeney 55'; Walker 77', 86'	Stadium: Broadhall Way; Attendance: 2,761; Referee: Dean Whitestone

26 December 2018 22	Mansfield Town	2–1	Bury	Mansfield
15:00 GMT	Hamilton 61'; Elšnik (yellow card) 66'; Walker 79' (pen.); Preston (yellow card) 90+6'	Report	O'Shea (yellow card) 48' (goal) 90+6' (pen.); Thompson (yellow card) 79'; Aimson (yellow card) 90+3'; Stokes (yellow card) 90+4'	Stadium: Field Mill; Attendance: 4,959; Referee: Ollie Yates

29 December 2018 23	Mansfield Town	0–0	Swindon Town	Mansfield
15:00 GMT	Preston (yellow card) 33'; Pearce (yellow card) 73'; Bishop (yellow card) 90+3'	Report	McCourt (yellow card) 22'; Doughty (yellow card) 54'	Stadium: Field Mill; Attendance: 5,311; Referee: Trevor Kettle

1 January 2019 24	Grimsby Town	0–1	Mansfield Town	Cleethorpes
13:00 GMT	Rose (yellow card) 60'	Report	Bishop 21'; Sweeney (yellow card) 68'	Stadium: Blundell Park; Attendance: 5,931; Referee: Matt Donohue

5 January 2019 25	Carlisle United	3–2	Mansfield Town	Carlisle
15:00 GMT	Sowerby 4'; Hope 26', 79'; Etuhu (yellow card) 39'; Grainger (yellow card) 45+1'	Report	Preston (yellow card) 40' (goal) 77'; Bishop (red card) 45'; Walker 86'	Stadium: Brunton Park; Attendance: 4,563; Referee: Robert Lewis

12 January 2019 26	Mansfield Town	0–1	Yeovil Town	Mansfield
15:00 GMT	Sweeney (yellow card) 45+3'; Preston (yellow card) 56' (yellow-red card) 90+2'	Report	Green 19'; Zoko (yellow card) 79'	Stadium: Field Mill; Attendance: 4,374; Referee: Carl Boyeson

15 January 2019 27	Mansfield Town	1–0	Crawley Town	Mansfield
19:45 GMT	Grant (yellow card) 42'; Bishop (yellow card) 64'; Walker 88'	Report	Dallison (yellow card) 30'; Young (yellow card) 36'; Payne (yellow card) 45+4'; Connolly (yellow card) 74'; Francomb (yellow card) 82'	Stadium: Field Mill; Attendance: 3,739; Referee: Martin Coy

19 January 2019 28	Colchester United	2–3	Mansfield Town	Colchester
15:00 GMT	Eastman 14'; Senior 30'; Lapslie (yellow card) 70'; Szmodics (yellow card) 74'; Nouble (yellow card) 90+3'	Report	Ajose 51'; Walker 64'; Benning (yellow card) 71'; Hamilton 79'	Stadium: Colchester Community Stadium; Attendance: 3,546; Referee: Brett Huxtable

26 January 2019 29	Mansfield Town	3–0	Tranmere Rovers	Mansfield
15:00 GMT	Grant 22', 68'; Walker 65'	Report	McCullough (yellow card) 15'; McNulty (yellow card) 21'; Banks (yellow card) 32' (yellow-red card) 37'; Monthé (yellow card) 45'	Stadium: Field Mill; Attendance: 4,885; Referee: Ben Toner

29 January 2019 30	Forest Green Rovers	1–1	Mansfield Town	Nailsworth
19:45 GMT	Reid 70'	Report	Grant 14'; Sweeney (yellow card) 40'	Stadium: The New Lawn; Attendance: 2,428; Referee: Christopher Sarginson

2 February 2019 31	Mansfield Town	3–1	Macclesfield Town	Mansfield
15:00 GMT	Grant 8'; Pearce 56'; Walker 89'	Report	Evans 42'; Ntambwe (yellow card) 64'	Stadium: Field Mill; Attendance: 5,642; Referee: Michael Salisbury

9 February 2019 32	Newport County	1–0	Mansfield Town	Newport
15:00 GMT	Willmott 15'; Amond (yellow card) 81'; Labadie (yellow card) 90+11'	Report	Sweeney (yellow card) 37'; Benning (yellow card) 42'; Pearce (yellow card) 90'	Stadium: Rodney Parade; Attendance: 3,133; Referee: Graham Salisbury

16 February 2019 33	Notts County	1–0	Mansfield Town	Nottingham
13:00 GMT	Mackail-Smith 19'; Stead (yellow card) 32'; Boldewijn (yellow card) 81'	Report	Turner (yellow card) 6'; Mellis (yellow card) 59'; Pearce (yellow card) 85'	Stadium: Meadow Lane; Attendance: 12,660; Referee: Lee Mason

23 February 2019 34	Mansfield Town	1–0	Forest Green Rovers	Mansfield
15:00 GMT	Preston (yellow card) 29'; Benning (yellow card) 32'; Walker 69' (red card) 90+7'; Tomlinson (yellow card) 90+3'	Report	Digby (yellow card) 32'; Winchester (yellow card) 52'; Gunning (yellow card) 64'; Doidge (yellow card) 90+6'	Stadium: Field Mill; Attendance: 5,256; Referee: Matt Donohue

2 March 2019 35	Mansfield Town	4–2	Cheltenham Town	Mansfield
15:00 GMT	Hamilton 42', 45'; Benning (yellow card) 58'; Atkinson 77'; MacDonald 90+2'; Tomlinson (yellow card) 90+5'	Report	Dawson (yellow card) 30'; Thomas (yellow card) 47'; Hussey 59'; Raglan 68'; Waters (yellow card) 90+5'	Stadium: Field Mill; Attendance: 5,276; Referee: Alan Young

9 March 2019 36	Port Vale	2–1	Mansfield Town	Burslem
15:00 GMT	Worrall (yellow card) 9'; Miller 50', 52'; Conlon (yellow card) 90+1'; Clark (yellow card) 90+5'	Report	Ajose (penalty missed) 18' 61'	Stadium: Vale Park; Attendance: 5,231; Referee: Darren Bond

12 March 2019 37	Crawley Town	0–0	Mansfield Town	Crawley
19:45 GMT	Francomb (yellow card) 85'; Willock (yellow card) 90+4'	Report	Turner (yellow card) 48'	Stadium: Broadfield Stadium; Attendance: 1,909; Referee: Lee Collins

18 March 2019 38	Mansfield Town	1–1	Lincoln City	Mansfield
19:45 GMT	Pearce 4'; Grant (yellow card) 17'; Preston (yellow card) 81'	Report	Akinde 75' (pen.) (yellow card) 79'	Stadium: Field Mill; Attendance: 7,177; Referee: Graham Scott

23 March 2019 39	Mansfield Town	1–2	Crewe Alexandra	Mansfield
15:00 GMT	Mellis (yellow card) 40'; Bishop (yellow card) 50'; Preston (yellow card) 57'; Pearce (yellow card) 59' (goal) 90+2'	Report	Ng (yellow card) 35'; Green (yellow card) 50'; Nolan (yellow card) 58'; Taylor-Sinclair (yellow card) 67'; Ainley 71', 84'; Garratt (yellow card) 90+3'	Stadium: Field Mill; Attendance: 4,675; Referee: Thomas Bramall

30 March 2019 40	Exeter City	1–4	Mansfield Town	Exeter
15:00 GMT	Jay 21' (yellow card) 82'; Taylor (yellow card) 45+2'; Wilson (yellow card) 70'; Woodman (yellow card) 74'	Report	Hamilton 20', 33'; Walker 57', 74' (pen.)	Stadium: St James Park; Attendance: 5,017; Referee: Ben Toner

6 April 2019 41	Mansfield Town	1–0	Cambridge United	Mansfield
15:00 BST	Walker 64'; Benning (yellow card) 87'	Report		Stadium: Field Mill; Attendance: 4,789; Referee: Craig Hicks

13 April 2019 42	Northampton Town	1–1	Mansfield Town	Northampton
15:00 BST	Foley 69'; Hoskins (yellow card) 90+1'; Pierre (yellow card) 90+4'	Report	Benning 11'; Preston (yellow card) 51'	Stadium: Sixfields Stadium; Attendance: 5,905; Referee: Paul Marsden

19 April 2019 43	Mansfield Town	4–0	Morecambe	Mansfield
15:00 BST	Mellis 30'; Pearce (yellow card) 45' (goal) 70'; Sweeney (yellow card) 54'; Hamilton 73'; Benning 85'	Report	Fleming (yellow card) 28'; Kenyon (yellow card) 36'; Mills (yellow card) 50'	Stadium: Field Mill; Attendance: 5,177; Referee: Trevor Kettle

22 April 2019 44	Oldham Athletic	3–2	Mansfield Town	Oldham
15:00 BST	Nepomuceno 29', 67'; Missilou (yellow card) 45'; Maouche 56'	Report	Grant (yellow card) 38'; Walker 60'; Bishop 76'	Stadium: Boundary Park; Attendance: 6,179; Referee: John Busby

27 April 2019 45	Mansfield Town	1–2	Stevenage	Mansfield
15:00 BST	Pearce (yellow card) 38'; Walker 83'	Report	Timlin (yellow card) 3'; Guthrie 71'; Chair 90+1'	Stadium: Field Mill; Attendance: 6,390; Referee: Darren Drysdale

4 May 2019 46	Milton Keynes Dons	1–0	Mansfield Town	Milton Keynes
15:00 BST	Wheeler 2'; Nicholls (yellow card) 63'; Aneke (yellow card) 89'	Report	MacDonald (yellow card) 81'; Logan (yellow card) 90+5'; Mellis (yellow card) 90+7'	Stadium: Stadium MK; Attendance: 20,718; Referee: Lee Probert

==== Play-offs ====
9 May 2019 1st leg	Newport County	1–1	Mansfield Town	Newport
19:45 BST	O'Brien (yellow card) 6'; Amond (penalty missed) 83' 83'	Report	Hamilton 12'; Pearce (yellow card) 54'; Rose (yellow card) 68'	Stadium: Rodney Parade; Attendance: 6,035; Referee: Charles Breakspear

12 May 2019 2nd leg	Mansfield Town	0–0 (1–1 agg.) (3–5 p)	Newport County	Mansfield
18:00		Report		Stadium: Field Mill; Attendance: 7,361; Referee: Michael Salisbury
	Penalties
	Ajose (penalty scored); Hamilton (penalty scored); Walker (penalty missed); Benning (penalty scored)		(penalty scored) Butler; (penalty scored) Amond; (penalty scored) Demetriou; (penalty scored) Poole; (penalty scored) Dolan

=== FA Cup ===
The first round draw was made live on BBC by Dennis Wise and Dion Dublin on 22 October.

11 November 2018 First round	Mansfield Town	1–1	Charlton Athletic	Mansfield
12:45 GMT	Hamilton 45'	Report	Stevenson 73'	Stadium: Field Mill; Attendance: 3,240; Referee: Ollie Yates

20 November 2018 First round replay	Charlton Athletic	5–0	Mansfield Town	Charlton
19:45 GMT	Taylor 11', 52', 85'; Marshall 81'; Ajose 90+1'	Report		Stadium: The Valley; Attendance: 1,910; Referee: Kevin Johnson

=== EFL Cup ===
On 15 June 2018, the draw for the first round was made in Vietnam. The second round draw was made from the Stadium of Light on 16 August.

14 August 2018 First round	Mansfield Town	6–1	Accrington Stanley	Mansfield
19:45 BST	Walker 9' (pen.), 13' (pen.), 45+2'; Khan 16'; Rose 66'; Hamilton 90+4'	Report	Finley 6'	Stadium: Field Mill; Attendance: 1,565; Referee: Seb Stockbridge

28 August 2018 Second round	West Bromwich Albion	2–1	Mansfield Town	West Bromwich
20:00 BST	Leko 26'; Edwards 75'	Report	Bishop 69'	Stadium: The Hawthorns; Attendance: 10,574; Referee: Steve Martin

=== EFL Trophy ===
On 13 July 2018, the initial group stage draw bar the U21 invited clubs was announced. The draw for the second round was made live on Talksport by Leon Britton and Steve Claridge on 16 November.

Pos	Lge	Team	Pld	W	PW	PL	L	GF	GA	GD	Pts	Qualification
1	L2	Mansfield Town	3	3	0	0	0	7	4	+3	9	Round 2
2	L2	Lincoln City	3	0	1	1	1	4	5	−1	3	Round 2
3	L1	Scunthorpe United	3	0	1	1	1	3	4	−1	3	
4	ACA	Wolverhampton Wanderers U21	3	0	1	1	1	3	4	−1	3	

Source: EFL.com

4 September 2018 Group stages	Lincoln City	1–2	Mansfield Town	Lincoln
19:45 BST	Rhead 6'; O'Connor (red card) 90+4'	Report	Butcher 8'; Walker 72'	Stadium: Sincil Bank; Attendance: 4,205; Referee: Ross Joyce

9 October 2018 Group stages	Mansfield Town	2–1	Wolverhampton Wanderers U21	Mansfield
19:45 BST	Mellis 4'; Benning 47'	Report	Pote 75'	Stadium: Field Mill; Attendance: 1,112

13 November 2018 Group stages	Mansfield Town	3–2	Scunthorpe United	Mansfield
19:45 GMT	Blake 21'; Butcher 55'; Elsnik 90'	Report	El-Mhanni 75'; Dales 90'	Stadium: Field Mill; Attendance: 928

4 December 2018 Second round	Mansfield Town	0–1	Bury	Mansfield
19:45 GMT		Report	Telford 35'; Dawson (red card) 85'	Stadium: Field Mill; Attendance: 1,029

== Squad statistics ==
No.	Pos.	Name	League Two		FA Cup		League Cup		League Trophy		Play-offs		Total		Discipline	
No.	Pos.	Name	Apps	Goals	Apps	Goals	Apps	Goals	Apps	Goals	Apps	Goals	Apps	Goals	Yellow card	Red card
1	GK	(Republic of Ireland) Conrad Logan	17	0	0	0	0	0	4	0	2	0	23	0	2	0
2	DF	(England) Hayden White	18(1)	1	1(1)	0	1	0	3	0	0	0	23(2)	1	5	0
3	DF	(England) Mal Benning	44(1)	3	2	0	2	0	3(1)	1	0(2)	0	51(4)	4	11	0
4	DF	(England) Matt Preston	38(1)	3	2	0	0	0	3(1)	0	0	0	43(2)	3	14	1
5	DF	(England) Krystian Pearce	46	4	2	0	2	0	2	0	2	0	54	4	10	0
6	MF	(England) Neal Bishop	43(1)	3	1	0	1	1	1	0	1	0	47(1)	4	13	1
7	MF	(Scotland) Alex MacDonald	13(8)	1	0	0	1(1)	0	1	0	2	0	17(9)	1	5	0
8	MF	(England) Jacob Mellis	33(8)	3	2	0	1	0	2	1	2	0	40(8)	4	9	0
9	FW	(Wales) Craig Davies	5(9)	2	1	0	1	0	1(1)	0	0	0	8(10)	2	0	0
10	MF	(England) Otis Khan	15(7)	2	0	0	2	1	1(1)	0	0	0	18(8)	3	2	0
11	MF	(England) Will Atkinson	4(14)	1	0	0	1(1)	0	3	0	0(1)	0	8(16)	1	6	1
12	GK	(Austria) Bobby Olejnik	17	0	2	0	2	0	0	0	0	0	21	0	0	0
14	GK	(England) Jordan Smith	12	0	0	0	0	0	0	0	0	0	12	0	0	0
16	MF	(England) Calum Butcher	2(10)	0	1(1)	0	2	0	3	2	0	0	7(11)	2	1	0
16	MF	(England) Willem Tomlinson	8(4)	0	0	0	0	0	0	0	1	0	9(4)	0	2	0
17	DF	(Republic of Ireland) Ryan Sweeney	37(1)	1	2	0	2	0	2	0	2	0	45(1)	1	11	0
19	FW	(England) Tyler Walker	43(1)	22	1(1)	0	2	3	1(1)	1	2	0	49(3)	26	2	1
20	MF	(Slovenia) Timi Elšnik	12(7)	3	1	0	0	0	3(1)	1	0	0	15(8)	4	3	0
20	DF	(Wales) Gethin Jones	12(3)	0	0	0	0	0	1	0	2	0	15(3)	0	1	0
21	MF	(England) Nicky Ajose	8(2)	2	0	0	0	0	0	0	0(1)	0	8(3)	2	0	0
21	GK	(England) Jake Kean	0	0	0	0	0	0	0	0	0	0	0	0	0	0
22	MF	(England) C. J. Hamilton	46	11	2	1	2	1	0(3)	0	2	1	52(3)	14	1	0
23	MF	(England) Jorge Grant	15(2)	4	0	0	0	0	0	0	0(1)	0	15(3)	4	3	0
24	MF	(Saint Kitts and Nevis) Omari Sterling-James	0(1)	0	0	0	0(1)	0	1	0	0	0	1(2)	0	0	0
25	DF	(England) Ben Turner	4(4)	0	0	0	0	0	0	0	2	0	6(4)	0	2	0
26	MF	(England) Jason Law	0	0	0	0	0	0	0(1)	0	0	0	0(1)	0	0	0
27	DF	(England) Lewis Gibbens	1	0	0	0	0	0	2	0	0	0	3	0	0	0
29	FW	(England) Jordan Graham	0(8)	0	0(2)	0	0(1)	0	2	0	0	0	2(11)	0	0	0
30	MF	(England) Alistair Smith	0	0	0	0	0	0	1	0	0	0	1	0	0	0
32	FW	(England) Danny Rose	13(21)	4	1(1)	0	0(2)	1	3(1)	0	2	0	19(25)	5	4	0
33	FW	(England) Nyle Blake	0	0	0	0	0	0	1	1	0	0	1	1	0	0
34	FW	(Antigua and Barbuda) Zayn Hakeem	0(1)	0	0	0	0	0	0	0	0	0	0(1)	0	0	0

== Transfers ==
=== Transfers in ===
Date from	Position	Nationality	Name	From	Fee	Ref.
1 July 2018	CM	(England)	Neal Bishop	Scunthorpe United	Free transfer	
1 July 2018	CF	(Wales)	Craig Davies	Oldham Athletic	Undisclosed	
1 July 2018	LW	(Pakistan)	Otis Khan	Yeovil Town	Undisclosed	
1 July 2018	CB	(England)	Matt Preston	Swindon Town	Free transfer	
14 December 2018	GK	(England)	Jake Kean	Sheffield Wednesday	Free transfer	
29 January 2019	CB	(Republic of Ireland)	Ryan Sweeney	Stoke City	Free transfer	
2 February 2019	CB	(England)	Ben Turner	Burton Albion	Free transfer	
4 February 2019	CM	(England)	Willem Tomlinson	Blackburn Rovers	Free transfer	

=== Transfers out ===
Date from	Position	Nationality	Name	To	Fee	Ref.
1 July 2018	RB	(England)	Rhys Bennett	Peterborough United	Released	
1 July 2018	CM	(England)	Joel Byrom	Stevenage	Released	
1 July 2018	MF	(Northern Ireland)	Lewis Collins	Free agent	Released	
1 July 2018	LB	(England) (Wales)	Johnny Hunt	Stevenage	Free transfer	
1 July 2018	RW	(England)	Alfie Potter	Billericay Town	Released	
1 July 2018	CF	(England)	Jimmy Spencer	Free agent	Released	
1 July 2018	CB	(England)	George Taft	Cambridge United	Released	
1 July 2018	CM	(England)	Jack Thomas	Basford United	Released	
31 July 2018	CB	(England)	Paul Digby	Forest Green Rovers	Undisclosed	
9 August 2018	CF	(England)	Lee Angol	Shrewsbury Town	Undisclosed	
16 October 2018	CB	(Scotland)	Zander Diamond	Retired	—N/a	
9 January 2019	GK	(England)	Jake Kean	Free agent	Released	
31 January 2019	RM	(England)	Paul Anderson	Plymouth Argyle	Mutual consent	
31 January 2019	DM	(England)	Calum Butcher	(Scotland) Dundee United	Undisclosed	

=== Loans in ===
Start date	Position	Nationality	Name	From	End date	Ref.
1 July 2018	CF	(England)	Tyler Walker	Nottingham Forest	31 May 2019	
3 August 2018	CB	(Republic of Ireland)	Ryan Sweeney	Stoke City	28 January 2019	
31 August 2018	CM	(Slovenia)	Timi Elšnik	Derby County	16 January 2019	
10 January 2019	GK	(England)	Jordan Smith	Nottingham Forest	31 May 2019	
14 January 2019	CF	(England)	Nicky Ajose	Charlton Athletic	31 May 2019	
14 January 2019	LM	(England)	Jorge Grant	Nottingham Forest	31 May 2019	
28 January 2019	RB	(Wales)	Gethin Jones	Fleetwood Town	31 May 2019	

=== Loans out ===
Start date	Position	Nationality	Name	From	End date	Ref.
13 September 2018	AM	(England)	Alistair Smith	Frickley Athletic	October 2018	
13 October 2018	CF	(Antigua and Barbuda)	Zayn Hakeem	Coalville Town	30 December 2018	
3 November 2018	LB	(England)	Henri Wilder	Lewes	January 2019	
30 November 2018	CB	(England)	Lewis Gibbens	Boston United	31 December 2018	
8 January 2019	RW	(England)	Nyle Blake	Alfreton Town	February 2019	
12 January 2019	CF	(England)	Iyrwah Gooden	Ramsbottom United	Youth loan	
25 January 2019	RM	(Saint Kitts and Nevis)	Omari Sterling-James	Brackley Town	31 May 2019	
31 January 2019	CB	(England)	David Mirfin	York City	31 May 2019	
9 February 2019	AM	(England)	Keaton Ward	AFC Mansfield	March 2019	
