= Alistair Smith (English footballer) =

English footballer (born 1999)

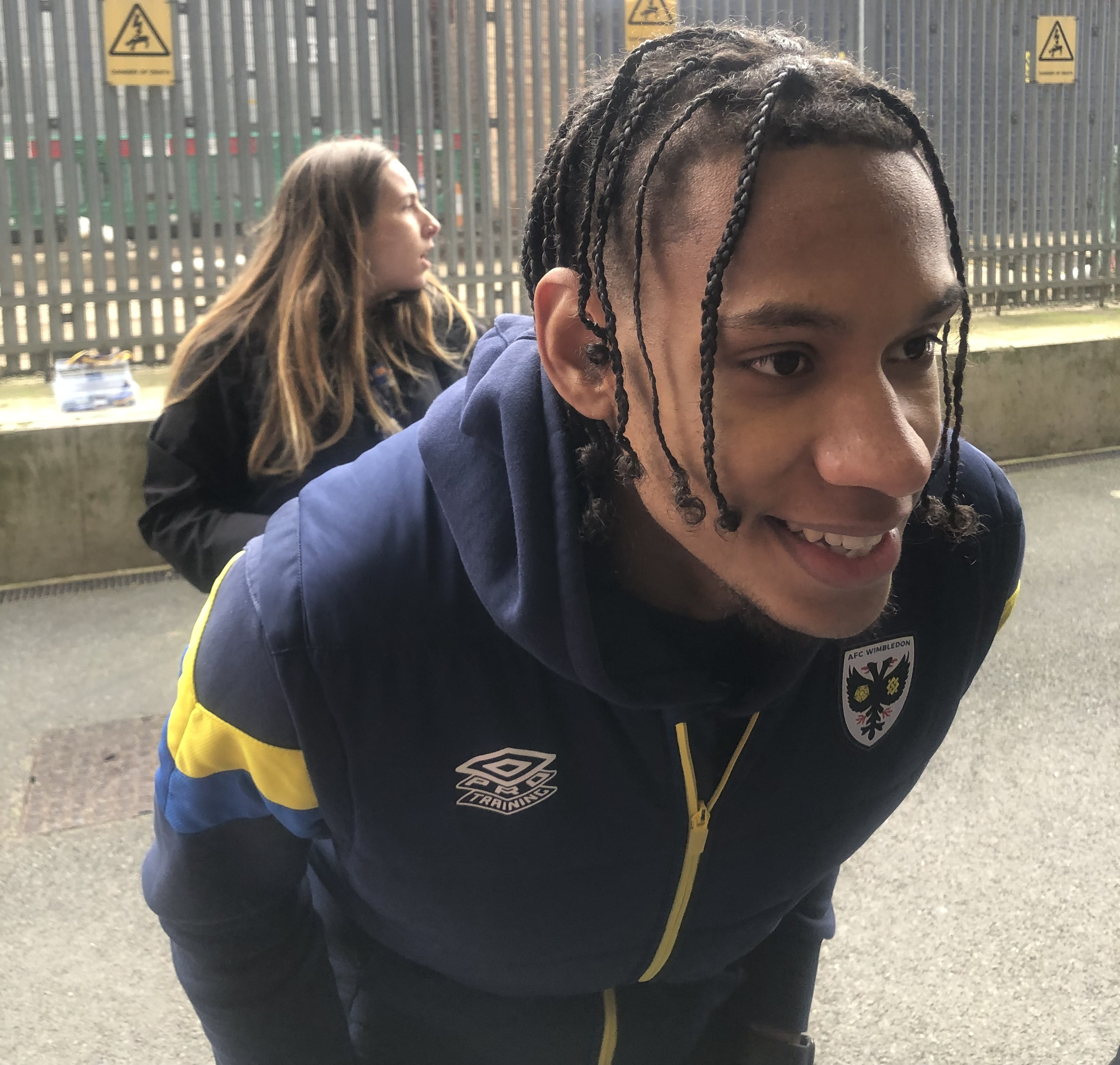
- Smith in 2025

Personal information
- Full name: Alistair Oluwashaun Smith
- Date of birth: 19 May 1999 (age 27)
- Place of birth: Beverley, England
- Height: 6 ft 4 in (1.93 m)
- Position: Midfielder

Team information
- Current team: AFC Wimbledon
- Number: 12

Youth career
- –2017: Mansfield Town

Senior career*
Years	Team	Apps	(Gls)
2017–2021	Mansfield Town	6	(0)
2017–2018	→ Loughborough Dynamo (loan)		
2018	→ Frickley Athletic (loan)	4	(0)
2020	→ Kettering Town (loan)	1	(0)
2020–2021	→ Altrincham (loan)	11	(0)
2021	Altrincham	30	(3)
2021–2023	Sutton United	68	(13)
2023–2025	Lincoln City	25	(1)
2024	→ Colchester United (loan)	15	(2)
2024–2025	→ AFC Wimbledon (loan)	45	(6)
2025–	AFC Wimbledon	59	(3)
- * Club domestic league appearances and goals as of 19:02, 14 November 2026 (UTC)

Alistair Oluwashaun Smith (born 19 May 1999) is an English professional footballer who plays as a midfielder for EFL League One club AFC Wimbledon.

== Career ==
A product of Mansfield Town's academy, Smith spent loan spells at Loughborough Dynamo and Frickley Athletic. He made his first-team debut for Mansfield on 13 November 2018, in the Football League Trophy, and signed a new 18-month contract with the club in January 2019. He made his first appearance of the 2019–20 season on 13 August 2019, in the EFL Cup. He joined Kettering Town on a one-month loan on 31 January 2020.

In November 2020 he moved on loan to National League side Altrincham. After making eleven league appearances for the Robins, Smith joined Altrincham on a permanent basis on 15 January 2021 by signing an 18-month contract with the club. He returned to the Football League with newly promoted Sutton United in July 2021. He won the Young Player of the Year award for the 2022–23 season.

On 12 June 2023, it was confirmed that Smith would be joining Lincoln City signing a two-year contract on a free transfer following the expiration of his Sutton United contract. On 5 August 2023, he made his Lincoln City debut coming off the bench against Bolton Wanderers. His first goal came against Exeter City on 28 October 2023.

In January 2024, Smith joined League Two club Colchester United on loan for the remainder of the season.

On 1 July, Smith joined AFC Wimbledon on loan for the 2024–25 season. Following the end of the 2024–25 season Smith was released by Lincoln City.

On 23 June 2025, AFC Wimbledon announced the signing of Smith to a two-year contract, from 1 July 2025 once his Lincoln City contract has expired. He made his second debut against Luton Town on the opening day of the season.

== Career statistics ==
As of match played 14 November 2026

Appearances and goals by club, season and competition
Club	Season	League			National cup		League cup		Other		Total	
Club	Season	Division	Apps	Goals	Apps	Goals	Apps	Goals	Apps	Goals	Apps	Goals
Mansfield Town	2018–19	League Two	0	0	0	0	0	0	1	0	1	0
Mansfield Town	2019–20	League Two	5	0	1	0	1	0	4	0	11	0
Mansfield Town	2020–21	League Two	1	0	0	0	0	0	3	0	4	0
Mansfield Town	Total		6	0	1	0	1	0	8	0	16	0
Kettering Town (loan)	2019–20	National League North	1	0	0	0	0	0	0	0	1	0
Altrincham	2020–21	National League	30	3	0	0	0	0	0	0	30	3
Sutton United	2021–22	League Two	33	8	1	0	1	0	5	1	40	9
Sutton United	2022–23	League Two	35	5	0	0	1	0	2	0	38	5
Sutton United	Total		68	13	1	0	2	0	7	1	78	14
Lincoln City	2023–24	League One	25	1	1	0	3	0	3 (Note: Appearance(s) in the EFL Trophy)	0	32	1
Lincoln City	2024–25	League One	0	0	0	0	0	0	0	0	0	0
Lincoln City	Total		25	1	1	0	3	0	3	0	32	1
Colchester United (loan)	2023–24	League Two	15	2	0	0	0	0	0	0	15	2
AFC Wimbledon (loan)	2024–25	League Two	45	6	2	0	3	0	4 (Note: One appearance in the EFL Trophy & three appearances in the League Two play-offs)	0	54	6
AFC Wimbledon	2025–26	League One	45	2	1	0	1	0	3	1	50	3
AFC Wimbledon	2026–27	League One	14	1	1	0	2	0	2	0	19	1
AFC Wimbledon	Total		59	3	2	0	3	0	5	1	69	4
Career total			249	28	7	0	12	0	27	2	295	30

== Honours ==
AFC Wimbledon

- EFL League Two play-offs: 2025
