= Hayden White (footballer) =

English footballer (born 1995)

Personal information
- Full name: Hayden Anthony Roy White
- Date of birth: 15 April 1995 (age 31)
- Place of birth: Greenwich, England
- Height: 1.85 m (6 ft 1 in)
- Position: Defender

Team information
- Current team: Indy Eleven
- Number: 2

Youth career
- –2013: Sheffield Wednesday

Senior career*
Years	Team	Apps	(Gls)
2013–2016	Bolton Wanderers	5	(0)
2014	→ Carlisle United (loan)	8	(0)
2014–2015	→ Bury (loan)	2	(0)
2015	→ Notts County (loan)	3	(0)
2015–2016	→ Blackpool (loan)	29	(1)
2016–2017	Peterborough United	6	(0)
2017	→ Mansfield Town (loan)	18	(1)
2017–2020	Mansfield Town	57	(1)
2020–2023	Walsall	106	(2)
2023–2024	Ebbsfleet United	19	(0)
2024–	Indy Eleven	35	(0)
- * Club domestic league appearances and goals as of 19:07, 7 November 2026 (UTC)

Hayden Anthony Roy White (born 15 April 1995) is an English professional footballer who plays as a defender for USL Championship club Indy Eleven. White has also played for clubs in the EFL Championship, League One, League Two, and the National League.

== Career ==
=== Bolton Wanderers (2013–2016) ===
White came through the youth ranks at Sheffield Wednesday before he signed for Bolton Wanderers on 24 June 2013 after turning down a professional contract.

He made his professional debut against Queens Park Rangers at Loftus Road on 28 January 2014, coming on as a substitute for the injured Tim Ream in the fifth minute.

White made his first start for the club in their 1–0 loss to Leicester City on 22 April and made his first appearance of the 2014–15 Championship season coming on as a second half stoppage time substitute for the injured Kevin McNaughton with his only and the game's final touch in a 2–1 defeat to Middlesbrough in August 2014.

==== Carlisle United, Bury, Notts County (Loans, 2014–2015) ====
On 18 September 2014, White joined Carlisle United on a one-month emergency loan. On 18 October 2014 White extended his loan until 15 November 2014.

White's Carlisle United loan was cut short through suspension and on 7 November 2014 he joined Bury on loan until January. When that loan expired, he joined Notts County on 19 January 2015 for the rest of the season, but was recalled by Bolton Wanderers early.

==== Blackpool (Loan, 2015–2016) ====
On 19 October 2015, he joined Blackpool on loan until early January 2016. He Scored his first goal for the club opening the scoring in a 2–0 win v Crewe Alexandra on 24 October 2015 in his second appearance. He was named in the Football League Team of the Week in the first week he was with Blackpool.

At the end of the 2015–16 season, Bolton confirmed that he would be leaving when his contract expired at the end of June.

=== Peterborough United (2016–2017) ===
On 16 May 2016, White joined Peterborough United on a two-year deal.

=== Mansfield Town (2017–2020) ===
On 12 January 2017, White joined Mansfield Town on loan until the end of the 2016–17 season. He made his move to the Stags permanent in May 2017. He was released by Mansfield at the end of the 2019–20 season.

=== Walsall (2020–2023) ===
On 3 September 2020, White signed for EFL League Two club Walsall.

White was released at the end of the 2022–23 season.

=== Ebbsfleet United (2023–2024) ===
On 27 June 2023, White signed for newly promoted National League club Ebbsfleet United.

=== Indy Eleven (2024–present) ===
On 29 August 2024, USL Championship club Indy Eleven announced the signing of White from Ebbsfleet United. He made his debut for the Indianapolis-based club on 31 August in a 1–1 home draw against Pittsburgh Riverhounds SC. White ended the season with six starts and appearances for the team, as well as a substitute appearance in the club's playoff loss to Rhode Island FC. On 20 November 2024, Indy Eleven announced that White would remain with the club for the 2025 season. He scored his first goal for Indy on 16 April 2025 in a 1–0 home victory over Miami FC in the U.S. Open Cup.

== Career statistics ==
As of match played 2 August 2025.

Club	Season	League			Domestic Cup		League Cup		Other		Total	
Club	Season	Division	Apps	Goals	Apps	Goals	Apps	Goals	Apps	Goals	Apps	Goals
Bolton Wanderers	2013–14	Championship	2	0	0	0	0	0	—		2	0
Bolton Wanderers	2014–15	Championship	3	0	0	0	0	0	—		3	0
Bolton Wanderers	2015–16	Championship	0	0	0	0	0	0	—		0	0
Bolton Wanderers	Total		5	0	0	0	0	0	—		5	0
Carlisle United (loan)	2014–15	League Two	8	0	0	0	0	0	1 (Note: Appearance in Football League Trophy)	0	9	0
Bury (loan)	2014–15	League Two	2	0	0	0	0	0	0	0	2	0
Notts County (loan)	2014–15	League One	3	0	0	0	0	0	0	0	3	0
Blackpool (loan)	2015–16	League One	29	1	0	0	0	0	0	0	29	1
Peterborough United	2016–17	League One	6	0	0	0	1	0	2 (Note: Appearance(s) in EFL Trophy)	0	9	0
Mansfield Town (loan)	2016–17	League Two	18	1	—		—		—		18	1
Mansfield Town	2017–18	League Two	28	1	2	0	0	0	2	0	32	1
Mansfield Town	2018–19	League Two	19	0	2	0	1	0	3	0	25	0
Mansfield Town	2019–20	League Two	10	0	0	0	1	0	0	0	11	0
Mansfield Town	Total		75	2	4	0	2	0	5	0	86	2
Walsall	2020–21	League Two	28	0	0	0	0	0	2	0	30	0
Walsall	2021–22	League Two	42	0	2	0	0	0	2	0	46	0
Walsall	2022–23	League Two	36	2	4	0	2	0	3	0	45	2
Walsall	Total		106	2	6	0	2	0	7	0	121	2
Ebbsfleet United	2023–24	National League	19	0	0	0	0	0	0	0	19	0
Ebbsfleet United	Total		19	0	0	0	0	0	0	0	19	0
Indy Eleven	2024	USL Championship	6	0	0	0	0	0	1 (Note: Appearance in USL Championship playoffs.)	0	7	0
Indy Eleven	2025	USL Championship	11	0	2	1	3	0	0	0	16	1
Indy Eleven	Total		17	0	2	1	3	0	1	0	23	1
Career total			270	5	11	1	8	0	16	0	306	6
