= Willem Tomlinson =

English footballer

Personal information
- Full name: Willem David Charlotte Daniel Tomlinson
- Date of birth: 27 January 1998 (age 28)
- Place of birth: Burnley, England
- Height: 1.79 m (5 ft 10 1/2 in)
- Position: Central midfielder

Youth career
- 2009–2016: Blackburn Rovers

Senior career*
Years	Team	Apps	(Gls)
2016–2019	Blackburn Rovers	5	(0)
2019–2020	Mansfield Town	30	(1)
2020	Padiham		
2020–2023	Chorley	83	(7)
2023	→ Marine (loan)	7	(1)
2023–2024	Radcliffe	16	(2)
2024–2025	Padiham		
2025	Warrington Rylands	4	(1)
2025–2026	Ashton United		
2026	Hanwell Town	4	(0)
2026	Bracknell Town	1	(0)
- * Club domestic league appearances and goals as of 06:55, 21 October 2026 (UTC)

Willem David Daniel Tomlinson (born 27 January 1998) is an English semi-professional footballer who plays as a midfielder.

== Club career ==
=== Blackburn Rovers ===
Tomlinson began in the youth ranks of EFL Championship side Blackburn Rovers from 2009. He was unused substitute on three occasions in the Championship, prior to making his first-team debut on 19 February 2017 in an FA Cup fifth-round tie against Manchester United. His league debut came a week later versus Derby County. On 3 November 2017, Tomlinson signed a new contract with Blackburn. However, he terminated his contract just over a year later in January 2019.

=== Mansfield Town ===
Prior to officially leaving Blackburn Rovers, Tomlinson trained with Exeter City. However, on 4 February 2019, Tomlinson signed a contract with fellow EFL League Two club Mansfield Town. He left Mansfield Town in September 2020, by mutual consent. He subsequently joined North West Counties Premier Division side Padiham to keep fit and started the two opening games of the season.

=== Chorley ===
On 20 November 2020, Tomlinson signed for Chorley on a permanent contract.

He went on loan to Marine in August 2023.

=== Radcliffe ===
On 13 November 2023, Tomlinson signed for Northern Premier League Premier Division club Radcliffe.

== Career statistics ==
As of match played 11 May 2022

Appearances and goals by club, season and competition
Club	Season	League			FA Cup		League Cup		Other		Total	
Club	Season	Division	Apps	Goals	Apps	Goals	Apps	Goals	Apps	Goals	Apps	Goals
Blackburn Rovers U23	2016–17	—			—		—		3 (Note: Appearance(s) in EFL Trophy)	0	3	0
Blackburn Rovers	2016–17	Championship	1	0	1	0	0	0	—		2	0
Blackburn Rovers	2017–18	League One	4	0	2	0	0	0	1	0	7	0
Blackburn Rovers	2018–19	Championship	0	0	0	0	1	0	—		1	0
Blackburn Rovers	Total		5	0	3	0	1	0	1	0	10	0
Mansfield Town	2018–19	League Two	12	0	—		—		1 (Note: Appearance in the League Two play-offs)	0	13	0
Mansfield Town	2019–20	League Two	18	1	1	0	1	0	2	0	22	1
Mansfield Town	Total		30	1	1	0	1	0	3	0	35	0
Chorley	2020–21	National League North	12	0	3	0	—		1 (Note: Appearance(s) in the FA Trophy)	0	16	0
Chorley	2021–22	National League North	38	5	2	1	—		2 (Note: One appearance in the National League North play-offs, one in the FA Trophy)	0	42	6
Chorley	Total		50	5	5	1	—		3	0	58	6
Career total			85	6	9	1	2	0	10	0	106	7
