= CJ Hamilton (footballer) =

Irish footballer (born 1995)

Personal information
- Full name: Christopher Nathan Hamilton
- Date of birth: 23 March 1995 (age 31)
- Place of birth: Harrow, England
- Height: 6 ft 1 in (1.86 m)
- Position: Winger

Team information
- Current team: Blackpool
- Number: 22

Youth career
- 2012–2014: Sheffield United

Senior career*
Years	Team	Apps	(Gls)
2014–2016	Sheffield United	0	(0)
2014	→ Mickleover (loan)		
2015	→ Gainsborough Trinity (loan)	8	(5)
2015	→ Halifax Town (loan)	9	(3)
2015–2016	→ Gateshead (loan)	25	(2)
2016–2020	Mansfield Town	142	(15)
2020–	Blackpool	206	(19)

International career
2022	Republic of Ireland	1	(0)
- * Club domestic league appearances and goals as of 08:13, 13 May 2026 (UTC)

Christopher Nathan "CJ" Hamilton (born 23 March 1995) is an Irish footballer who plays as a winger for EFL League One club Blackpool. He has previously played for Sheffield United, Mickleover, Gainsborough Trinity, Halifax Town, Gateshead and Mansfield Town. Born in England and raised in Ireland, he has represented the Republic of Ireland at international level.

== Early life ==
Hamilton was born in Harrow but he moved to Clonea, County Waterford, Ireland, as a child. He played hurling for Clonea GAA and football for Carrick United.

== Club career ==
Hamilton began his career with Sheffield United and spent time out on loan at Mickleover and Gainsborough Trinity in 2014–15, before again going out on loan to Halifax Town and Gateshead in the 2015–16 season. He joined Mansfield Town in June 2016 and made his professional debut on 9 August 2016 against Blackburn Rovers in the EFL Cup.

In June 2019 he was linked with a transfer away from Mansfield. He joined Blackpool on 22 July 2020, for an undisclosed fee, on a three-year contract. He renewed his contract in December 2023, keeping him at the club until at least June 2026.

On 6 May 2026, Blackpool announced it had triggered an extension on the player's contract.

== International career ==
Born in England, Hamilton is of Irish descent through his mother. received his first call-up to the Republic of Ireland senior team on 25 May 2022 ahead of their UEFA Nations League games against Armenia, Ukraine and Scotland.

On 8 June 2022, Hamilton made his international debut for Ireland in a single-goal defeat at home to Ukraine.

== Career statistics ==
As of end of 2025–26 season

Appearances and goals by club, season and competition
Club	Season	League			FA Cup		League Cup		Other		Total	
Club	Season	Division	Apps	Goals	Apps	Goals	Apps	Goals	Apps	Goals	Apps	Goals
Sheffield United	2014–15	League One	0	0	0	0	0	0	0	0	0	0
Sheffield United	2015–16	League One	0	0	0	0	0	0	0	0	0	0
Sheffield United	Total		0	0	0	0	0	0	0	0	0	0
Mickleover (loan)	2014–15	NPL Division One South					–		–			
Gainsborough Trinity (loan)	2014–15	Conference North	8	5	–		–		–		8	5
FC Halifax Town (loan)	2015–16	National League	9	3	0	0	–		–		9	3
Gateshead (loan)	2015–16	National League	25	2	–		–		5 (Note: Appearance(s) in the FA Trophy)	0	30	2
Mansfield Town	2016–17	League Two	29	0	0	0	1	0	6 (Note: Appearance(s) in the EFL Trophy)	0	36	0
Mansfield Town	2017–18	League Two	33	2	4	0	1	0	3	1	41	3
Mansfield Town	2018–19	League Two	46	11	2	1	2	1	5 (Note: Three appearances in the EFL Trophy; two appearances in the League Two play-offs)	1	55	14
Mansfield Town	2019–20	League Two	34	2	2	0	1	0	4	1	41	3
Mansfield Town	Total		142	15	8	1	5	1	18	3	173	20
Blackpool	2020–21	League One	22	5	2	0	1	0	1 (Note: Appearance in the EFL League One play-offs)	0	26	5
Blackpool	2021–22	Championship	24	2	1	0	2	0	–		27	2
Blackpool	2022–23	Championship	39	1	2	1	1	0	–		42	2
Blackpool	2023–24	League One	44	4	2	0	1	0	2	0	49	4
Blackpool	2024–25	League One	34	3	0	0	1	0	2	2	37	5
Blackpool	2025–26	League One	43	4	3	0	1	0	3	0	50	4
Blackpool	Total		206	19	10	1	7	0	8	2	145	22
Career total			386	44	18	2	12	1	31	5	451	52

== Honours ==
Blackpool

- EFL League One play-offs: 2021
