= Krystian Pearce =

Barbados international footballer (born 1990)

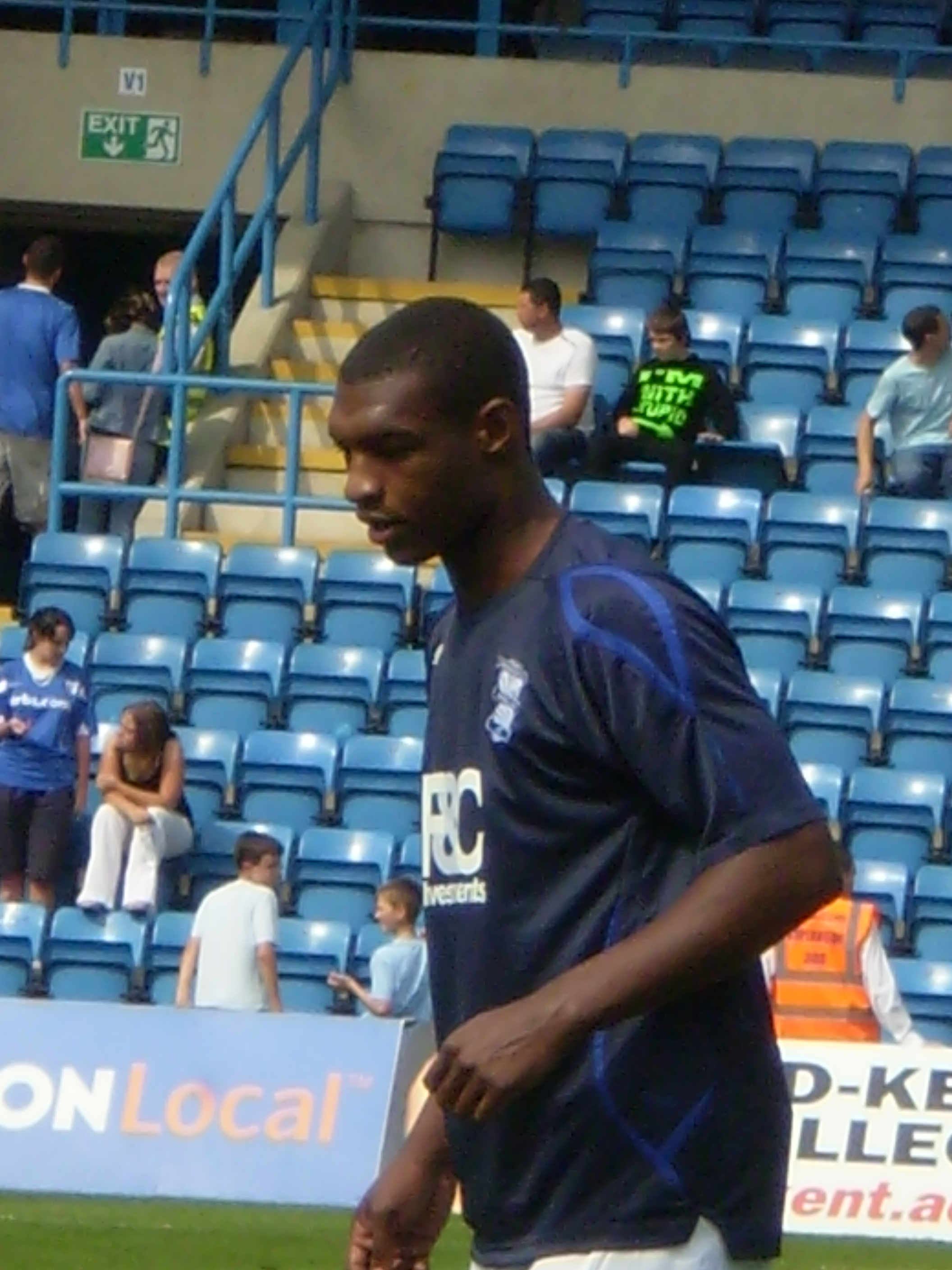
- Pearce warming up for Birmingham City in 2008

Personal information
- Full name: Krystian Mitchell Victor Pearce
- Date of birth: 5 January 1990 (age 36)
- Place of birth: Birmingham, England
- Height: 6 ft 1 in (1.85 m)
- Position: Defender

Youth career
- 2000–2007: Birmingham City

Senior career*
Years	Team	Apps	(Gls)
2007–2010	Birmingham City	0	(0)
2007–2008	→ Notts County (loan)	8	(1)
2008	→ Port Vale (loan)	12	(0)
2008–2009	→ Scunthorpe United (loan)	40	(1)
2009–2010	→ Peterborough United (loan)	2	(0)
2010	→ Huddersfield Town (loan)	0	(0)
2010	Huddersfield Town	1	(0)
2010–2013	Notts County	56	(5)
2012	→ Barnet (loan)	17	(1)
2013–2015	Torquay United	67	(5)
2015–2020	Mansfield Town	192	(13)
2020–2021	Solihull Moors	6	(1)
2021	Boreham Wood	21	(0)
2021–2022	Hereford	22	(0)
2022–2024	Kidderminster Harriers	79	(5)
2024–2026	Alvechurch	77	(4)
Total		600	(36)

International career
2006–2007	England U17	13	(2)
2007–2008	England U19	11	(2)
2018–2023	Barbados	13	(0)
Medal record
Men's football
Representing England
UEFA European Under-17 Championship
Runner-up	2007
- * Club domestic league appearances and goals

Krystian Mitchell Victor Pearce (born 5 January 1990) is a former professional footballer who played as a defender and represented the Barbados national team.

Pearce began his football career with Birmingham City but never played for their first team. He spent time on loan at Notts County, with whom he made his debut in the English Football League, Port Vale, Scunthorpe United and Peterborough United before leaving Birmingham permanently for Huddersfield Town in 2010. He returned to Notts County later that year and had a spell on loan at Barnet in 2012 before signing for Torquay United in 2013. After two seasons with Torquay, he spent five years with Mansfield Town in League Two and then half a season with Solihull Moors in the National League. He joined Hereford in August 2021 and moved to Kidderminster Harriers in June 2022. He was promoted out of the National League North with Kidderminster via the play-offs in 2023 and moved on to Alvechurch the following year.

Pearce was born in England and played for England U17 at the 2007 UEFA European Under-17 Football Championship, where they reached the final, and at the 2007 FIFA U-17 World Cup. In September 2007, he made his debut for the England under-19 team, the year above his actual age group, and played at the finals of the 2008 UEFA European Under-19 Championship. He switched in 2018 to represent Barbados, for which he qualified via descent.

== Club career ==
=== Birmingham City ===
Pearce was born in Birmingham and started his career at Sunday league side Kingsdown Colts before joining Birmingham City's Academy when he was ten. He began as a striker but converted to play in defence. He was first given a squad number in January 2007 when included in the travelling squad for the FA Cup replay at Newcastle United but did not make the final 16. Two months later he signed his first professional contract, due to expire in 2009. He made frequent appearances for Birmingham City's reserve team, winners of their division of the Central League. As captain of the under-18 side, he scored the winning goal which put his team through to the quarter-final of the FA Youth Cup, in which he conceded a penalty as Birmingham lost to Manchester United. Singled out in Academy manager Terry Westley's end-of-season report as "the one name that does stand out in terms of what he has achieved", Pearce was chosen as Academy Player of the Season for 2006–07.

==== 2007–08 season ====
Pearce was given a squad number for the 2007–08 season and included in Birmingham's squad for the League Cup match at Blackburn Rovers, but remained an unused substitute.

On 8 November 2007, Pearce signed a one-month loan deal at League Two side Notts County in order to gain experience. He made his competitive debut two days later in the starting eleven for Notts County's 3–0 FA Cup first round win over Histon, and the following Saturday made his Football League debut for the club, playing the full 90 minutes in the 1–0 defeat at home to Macclesfield Town. On 8 December he scored his first senior goal, in a 2–1 win against Shrewsbury Town, contributing to him being named in the League Two Team of the Week, after which his loan was extended for a further month. A sending off for a clumsy challenge failed to dampen County's wish to extend the loan again, but Birmingham recalled the player at the expiry of the second month so that new manager Alex McLeish could assess him as possible cover during Radhi Jaïdi's absence at the 2008 Africa Cup of Nations.

On 31 January 2008, Pearce joined Port Vale of League One on loan for an initial period of one month to gain experience at a higher level. This loan spell was disrupted by another red card, this time for two bookings, resulting in a two-game ban which left the player anxious to make amends. This loan was twice extended, up to the maximum permissible 93 days, though an ankle injury cut short his stay with the club.

==== 2008–09 season ====
In May 2008, Pearce signed a new two-year contract with Birmingham in recognition of his performances while on loan and his potential to develop into a first-team player.

On 19 August 2008, he joined League One club Scunthorpe United on loan for a month, later extended, initially until January 2009, then until the end of the season, including, if necessary, for the play-offs. Pearce scored twice for Scunthorpe, once in the league against Swindon Town and once in the Football League Trophy against Rotherham United. He partnered with David Mirfin for the majority of the 2008–09 campaign, though was dropped for the experienced Andy Crosby with four games left of the season due to niggling injuries and a lack of form – Crosby went on to captain the club to victory in the play-off final.

==== 2009–10 season ====
Pearce signed for Peterborough United on a season-long loan on 20 July 2009. In the starting eleven for the League Cup win against Wycombe Wanderers in August, he had to wait until late September for his first League appearance, as a second-half substitute in a poor team performance as Peterborough lost 2–0 away at Blackpool. In contention to start the next game, Pearce remained among the substitutes as changes were made in defence, and his 20-minute appearance as Peterborough lost 2–1 at home to Plymouth Argyle was his last League outing for the club. Pearce remained out of favour as Mark Cooper succeeded Darren Ferguson as manager, and in January 2010 the loan was cut short and the player returned to Birmingham.

=== Huddersfield Town ===
On 19 January 2010, Pearce joined League One side Huddersfield Town on an emergency loan deal, to be made permanent the following day. He made his debut for the Terriers as a half-time substitute in the 5–0 defeat by Southampton at St Mary's Stadium on 2 March. That turned out to be Pearce's only appearance for Huddersfield, as loan signing Neal Trotman was preferred, and the player left the club at the end of the 2009–10 season having failed to reach agreement on a new deal.

=== Notts County ===
After a successful trial, Pearce signed a one-year deal with former club Notts County in August 2010. He established himself as a first-team regular and was rewarded with a contract extension until 2013. In March 2011, he suffered a serious injury after a clash of heads with teammate Stephen Darby in training, only weeks after a similar collision with Manchester City's Mario Balotelli in an FA Cup match. He remained unconscious for two to three minutes and was detained in hospital, where he was found to have blood on the brain. Manager Paul Ince said it was "a massive blow" to lose Pearce from the defence for an expected six weeks as the team battled against relegation. He made an unexpected return to action in a 1–1 draw against Brentford on 25 April; in his absence, County had lost nine successive games. His performances over the season led to his nomination for the club's Player of the Season award.

Pearce scored his first goal of the 2011–12 campaign in a 3–2 victory against Tranmere Rovers in August. He was handed the captaincy for the game against Preston North End for which regular captain Neal Bishop was suspended. He scored his second goal of the season against AFC Bournemouth in a 3–1 win. Pearce suffered a groin injury in August, which caused him discomfort during the first half of the campaign; in January 2012, he said that he had "felt it in games but you have to play through it. Adrenalin usually gets you through and that's what I've been relying on." He underwent a hernia operation at the end of the season.

Manager Keith Curle made what the Nottingham Post described as a "shock decision" to place Pearce on the transfer list in May 2012, suggesting that the player had "not been able to recreate the level of performance [he] was hoping for and expecting". Curle said that Pearce would not be given a free transfer, and claimed that a £500,000 bid had been rejected during the season. He joined League Two club Barnet on a three-month loan on 14 September, and made his debut the next day, playing in central defence alongside David Stephens in a 3–0 defeat away to Bradford City. Pearce scored his first goal for the club with a glancing header from a John Oster corner as Barnet beat Northampton Town 4–0 at Underhill on 19 October. He continued as a first-team regular until returning to Notts County when his loan expired, match-fit and hopeful of proving himself to Curle. He played the last two games of County's 2012–13 season, and scored the last goal of their campaign in a 2–2 draw with Coventry City at Meadow Lane. Out of contract at the end of the season, Pearce was told that any new deal was subject to budgetary considerations; in the event, he was released.

=== Torquay United ===
On 30 July 2013, Pearce signed a two-year contract with League Two club Torquay United. He made 37 appearances as Torquay were relegated out of the Football League in the 2013–14 season. He made 32 League appearances in 2014–15, and was then released after manager Chris Hargreaves judged that Pearce failed to "reach the heights of last season" and that his wages were too high for the club.

=== Mansfield Town ===
Pearce signed for League Two side Mansfield Town following a trial period in July 2015. He made 40 appearances in the 2015–16 campaign despite being sent off three times, and signed a new contract in the summer. He stated that he was happy to be signing again because he believed in the squad and in what manager Adam Murray was trying to achieve. He scored four goals in 48 appearances in the 2016–17 campaign and was named as the club's Player of the Season.

Speaking in September, he stated that the "Stags" aimed to finish in the top three at the end of the 2017–18 season after manager Steve Evans invested heavily in the playing squad over the summer. Pearce signed a new one-year contract, with the option of a further 12 months, to keep him at Field Mill until either 2019 or 2020. He made 44 appearances in the 2017–18 campaign, scoring two goals and receiving one red card, as Mansfield finished in a disappointing eighth place under the stewardship of David Flitcroft.

He was named on League Two's PFA Team of the Year and EFL Team of the Season for the 2018–19 campaign, alongside teammate Tyler Walker, having scored four goals in 54 league and cup appearances. On 2 February, he scored in a 3–1 home win over Macclesfield Town to secure himself a place on the EFL Team of the Week. Despite keeping 18 clean sheets in the league, Mansfield missed out on automatic promotion by three points and went on to lose to Newport County on away goals in the play-off semi-finals. He was named as the club's captain.

On 5 October 2019, he scored the game's only goal at Grimsby Town to earn himself a place on the EFL team of the week. He was transfer-listed in January by new manager Graham Coughlan, who later admitted that "I had to ruffle a few feathers at the club" and "the best way into a dressing room is through the skipper". Pearce was released at the end of the 2019–20 season.

=== Solihull Moors ===
Pearce signed a short-term deal with National League club Solihull Moors on 30 October 2020, and made his debut the following day in the starting eleven away to Maidenhead United. He played the whole match, which ended as a 3–1 defeat. He went on to play nine matches in all competitions and score three goals before, on 5 January 2021, the club confirmed that his contract had ended.

=== Boreham Wood ===
On 18 January 2021, Pearce signed for fellow National League side Boreham Wood on an 18-month contract. He was cup-tied after playing for Solihull in the FA Trophy, but played 21 league games for Boreham Wood in the second half of the 2020–21 season. He was transfer-listed at the end of the season for what were described as "location reasons".

=== Hereford ===
Pearce joined National League North club Hereford on 30 August 2021. Manager Josh Gowling said that his side had needed an "experienced leader". After administrative issues delayed his registration, he finally made his debut on 18 September in the FA Cup second qualifying round against Lymington Town but lasted only 18 minutes before injury intervened. Pearce won the league's Player of the Month award for November after helping his side achieve five league wins throughout the month without conceding a goal. He was released at the end of the 2021–22 season.

=== Kidderminster Harriers ===
Pearce joined National League North club Kidderminster Harriers on a one-year deal on 22 June 2022. He started the opening match of the season and was reportedly fortunate not to be sent off for elbowing an opponent. He played 42 of the club's 46 league games across the 2022–23 campaign, helping them to qualify for the play-offs. Promotion was secured with a 2–0 victory over Brackley Town in the play-off final. He played 39 games in the 2023–24 season as Kidderminster were relegated back out of the National League in 22nd place.

=== Alvechurch ===
On 8 June 2024, Pearce joined Southern League Premier Division Central side Alvechurch. He featured 50 times across the 2024–25 campaign, scoring two goals and being sent off once. He was offered a new contract. He retired from professional football at the end of the 2025–26 season.

== International career ==
Pearce was born in England, and is of Barbadian descent through his father.

He was first capped at under-17 level for England on 27 October 2006 in a UEFA mini-tournament against Portugal, and was part of the squad which qualified for the final stages of the UEFA European Under-17 Championship held in Belgium in May 2007. He started all of England's games in those finals, and scored their opening goal, his first at international level, helping them to reach the final in which they lost 1–0 to Spain.

England's performance in the UEFA championships earned them qualification for the 2007 FIFA U-17 World Cup in South Korea. Again Pearce was in the starting eleven for each of England's games and scored the second goal in their win over Syria U-17 in the round of 16, described in FIFA's match report as: "Once again, another Porritt cross caused problems for Mohamad Aljomaa's side, the ball fell to centre half Krystian Pearce, who showed all the composure of a striker, taking two touches before hitting a low shot into the net."

During both the European and World tournaments, Pearce formed a sound defensive partnership with team captain Jordan Spence of West Ham United; Sir Trevor Brooking, the Football Association's Director of Football Development, tipped the pair for future success. Pearce was described in an article on the FA's website as "arguably England's best player at the World Cup".

In September 2007, Pearce was called up to the England under-19 squad for the qualifying tournament for the 2008 UEFA European Under-19 Football Championship, despite being a year younger than most of the squad. He played all of England's first two games and rested for the third, coming on at half-time and scoring the third goal in a 3–1 win. Called up for a friendly against Russia under-19 in March 2008, Pearce was withdrawn and allowed to play for his loan club Port Vale, on the grounds that both England under-19 coach Brian Eastick and Birmingham City saw "playing in a League One game against Gillingham as being beneficial to his development". He was part of the under-19 squad that topped their group at the elite qualification stage, starting in their second match and coming on as a very late substitute in the third. In England's first group match in the finals, a lack of communication between Pearce and his goalkeeper cost England a goal against their Czech counterparts. He retained his starting place for the remaining group games, keeping clean sheets in a goalless draw with Italy, where he made a vital late interception, and a 3–0 defeat of Greece. Though England failed to reach the semifinals, their performance was good enough to qualify for the final stages of the 2009 FIFA U-20 World Cup.

Pearce took part in two of the three group matches in the first qualifying round for the 2009 European Under-19 Championships, as a half-time substitute in a 3–1 victory over their Northern Irish counterparts which ensured qualification for the elite qualification round, and playing the whole of the 4–1 defeat by Serbia.

Pearce switched to represent Barbados and made his debut in a 2–2 draw with Guyana in a 2019–20 CONCACAF Nations League qualifying match on 6 September 2018. However, he and fellow debutant Hallam Hope were deemed ineligible by CONCACAF, and the result of the match overturned into a 3–0 defeat for Barbados. His Barbados nationality was formally recognised by FIFA in December 2020, making him once again eligible to represent the country.

== Style of play ==
Pearce is good in the air, as one would expect of a large man, and has pace and composure. He is equally comfortable with the ball at his feet and does not lack confidence. According to Birmingham Academy manager Terry Westley, "he has pace and power in abundance and he will be an absolute giant when he stops growing. He's strong, he's tidied up his feet and he's another ... who is not flash or arrogant. He thrives on being pushed."

== Career statistics ==
=== Club ===
Appearances and goals by club, season and competition
Club	Season	League			FA Cup		League Cup		Other		Total	
Club	Season	Division	Apps	Goals	Apps	Goals	Apps	Goals	Apps	Goals	Apps	Goals
Birmingham City	2007–08	Premier League	0	0	0	0	0	0	—		0	0
Birmingham City	2008–09	Championship	—		—		—		—		—	
Birmingham City	2009–10	Premier League	0	0	—		0	0	—		0	0
Birmingham City	Total		0	0	0	0	0	0	—		0	0
Notts County (loan)	2007–08	League Two	8	1	1	0	—		—		9	1
Port Vale (loan)	2007–08	League One	12	0	—		—		—		12	0
Scunthorpe United (loan)	2008–09	League One	40	1	2	0	—		5 (Note: Appearances in Football League Trophy)	1	47	2
Peterborough United (loan)	2009–10	Championship	2	0	—		3	0	—		5	0
Huddersfield Town (loan)	2009–10	League One	1	0	—		—		0	0	1	0
Notts County	2010–11	League One	27	1	4	1	3	0	1	0	35	2
Notts County	2011–12	League One	27	3	2	0	1	0	1	0	31	3
Notts County	2012–13	League One	2	1	—		0	0	0	0	2	1
Notts County	Total		56	5	6	1	4	0	2	0	68	6
Barnet (loan)	2012–13	League Two	17	1	0	0	—		1	0	18	1
Torquay United	2013–14	League Two	35	4	0	0	1	0	1	0	37	4
Torquay United	2014–15	Conference Premier	32	1	0	0	—		5 (Note: Appearance(s) in FA Trophy)	0	37	1
Torquay United	Total		67	5	0	0	1	0	6	0	74	5
Mansfield Town	2015–16	League Two	38	3	1	0	0	0	1	0	40	3
Mansfield Town	2016–17	League Two	41	3	1	0	0	0	6 (Note: Appearances in EFL Trophy)	1	48	4
Mansfield Town	2017–18	League Two	38	1	3	1	1	0	2	0	44	2
Mansfield Town	2018–19	League Two	46	4	2	0	2	0	4 (Note: Two appearances in EFL Trophy, two in League Two play-offs)	0	54	4
Mansfield Town	2019–20	League Two	29	2	1	0	1	1	0	0	31	3
Mansfield Town	Total		192	13	8	1	4	1	13	1	217	16
Solihull Moors	2020–21	National League	6	1	2	1	—		1	1	9	3
Boreham Wood	2020–21	National League	21	0	—		—		—		21	0
Boreham Wood	2021–22	National League	0	0	—		—		—		0	0
Boreham Wood	Total		21	0	0	0	—		—		21	0
Hereford	2021–22	National League North	22	0	1	0	—		1	0	24	0
Kidderminster Harriers	2022–23	National League North	42	4	4	0	—		6 (Note: Three appearances in the FA Trophy and three appearances in the play-offs)	0	52	4
Kidderminster Harriers	2023–24	National League	37	1	1	0	—		1	0	39	1
Kidderminster Harriers	Total		79	5	5	0	—		7	0	91	5
Alvechurch	2024–25	Southern League; Premier Division Central	41	2	1	0	—		8 (Note: Three appearances in FA Trophy, one appearance and one goal in Birmingham Senior Cup, four appearances in Worcestershire Senior Cup)	1	50	3
Alvechurch	2025–26	Southern League; Premier Division Central	36	2	0	0	—		0	0	36	2
Alvechurch	Total		77	4	1	0	—		8	1	86	5
Career total			600	36	26	3	12	1	44	4	682	44

=== International ===
Appearances and goals by national team and year
National team	Year	Apps	Goals
Barbados	2018	2	0
Barbados	2021	4	0
Barbados	2022	3	0
Barbados	2023	4	0
Barbados	Total	13	0

== Honours ==
Birmingham City Reserves

- Central League Division One Central: 2006–07

Scunthorpe United

- Football League Trophy runner-up: 2008–09

Kidderminster Harriers

- National League North play-offs: 2023

England under-17

- UEFA European Under-17 Championship runners-up: 2007

Individual

- Birmingham City Academy Player of the Season: 2006–07
- Mansfield Town Player of the Season: 2016–17
- EFL Team of the Season: 2018–19
- PFA Team of the Year: 2018–19 League Two
- National League North Player of the Month: November 2021
