= Matt Preston (footballer) =

English footballer (born 1995)

Personal information
- Full name: Matthew Eric Preston
- Date of birth: 16 March 1995 (age 31)
- Place of birth: Birmingham, England
- Height: 1.89 m (6 ft 2 in)
- Position: Centre-back

Team information
- Current team: Halesowen Town

Youth career
- –2014: Walsall

Senior career*
Years	Team	Apps	(Gls)
2014–2017	Walsall	41	(3)
2014	→ ÍBV (loan)	0	(0)
2014	→ Barwell (loan)	12	(1)
2017–2018	Swindon Town	21	(2)
2018–2020	Mansfield Town	61	(4)
2020–2021	Barnet	15	(0)
2021–2023	Solihull Moors	7	(0)
2022	→ Kidderminster Harriers (loan)	6	(0)
2023	→ Brackley Town (loan)	9	(0)
2023–2024	Kidderminster Harriers	18	(1)
2024–2026	Hereford	70	(3)
2026–	Halesowen Town	0	(0)
- * Club domestic league appearances and goals as of 13:36, 20 June 2026 (UTC)

Matthew Eric Preston (born 16 March 1995) is an English footballer who plays as a centre-back for Southern League Premier Division Central club Halesowen Town.

== Career ==
=== Walsall ===
Preston was captain of the Walsall youth team when he signed an 18-month professional contract with Walsall in January 2013.

In January 2014 he joined up with Icelandic side ÍBV—managed by former Walsall player Sigurður Ragnar Eyjólfsson—on loan. He played in a 2–1 loss against Stjarnan in a pre-season tournament, but was not taken on by ÍBV and subsequently returned to Walsall. After his brief spell in Iceland, Preston spent two-months on loan at Northern Premier League side Barwell making twelve appearances and scoring one goal. He made his debut for the "Saddlers" in the Football League on 10 February 2015, coming on for Michael Cain 89 minutes into a 3–2 victory over Rochdale at the Bescot Stadium.

Preston's contract with Walsall expired at the end of the 2016–17 season.

=== Swindon Town ===
Following his release from Walsall, Preston joined Swindon Town in September 2017, on a deal until the end of the campaign.

On 30 September 2017, he made his Swindon debut during their 2–0 home victory against Cambridge United, featuring for the entire 90 minutes. A week later, Preston scored his first Swindon goal during their 2–1 away defeat against Cheltenham Town, netting the Robins' equaliser in the 53rd minute. On 31 October 2017, he went onto score the winner in Swindon's EFL Trophy tie against Wycombe Wanderers, netting in the 88th minute. During Swindon's 1–0 victory over Mansfield Town, Preston suffered a serious knee injury ruling him out for the remainder of the 2017–18 campaign.

=== Mansfield Town ===
On 29 May 2018, Preston reunited with former manager, David Flitcroft at Mansfield Town after rejecting a new three-year deal at Swindon. He was released by Mansfield at the end of the 2019–20 season.

=== Barnet ===
Preston signed for Barnet on 1 October 2020. He left the club by mutual consent in July 2021 after 16 appearances.

=== Solihull Moors ===
Preston joined Solihull Moors on a two-year deal on 20 July 2021.

==== Kidderminster Harriers (loan) ====
In January 2022, Preston joined National League North side Kidderminster Harriers on a two-month loan deal.

On 5 February 2022, he played in the Harriers' 4th round FA Cup tie against Premier League side West Ham United, where he was awarded the BBC Man of the Match award by pundit Dion Dublin.

Preston's loan spell was cut short on 19 February 2022, after receiving a serious ankle injury from a tackle against Alfreton Town. The match itself ended up being abandoned due to the injury.

==== Brackley Town (loan) ====
On 21 March 2023, Preston joined National League North side Brackley Town to help with the promotion run. He helped Brackley Town all the way to the final before losing out to former side Kidderminster Harriers.

=== Kidderminster Harriers ===
Following his release from Solihull Moors, Preston began training with former side Kidderminster Harriers before penning a deal for the season ahead on 21 July 2023. He was released by Kidderminster at the end of his contract after the club's relegation from the National League.

=== Hereford ===
On 11 July 2024, Preston signed for Harriers' divisional and local rivals Hereford. He extended his stay at Hereford in June 2025 after signing a new deal for the 2025–26 season. He was released by the club at the end of the 2025–26 season.

=== Halesowen Town ===
On 19 June 2026, Preston signed for Southern League Premier Division Central club Halesowen Town, linking up with his former Kidderminster manager Russell Penn.

== Career statistics ==
As of end of 2025–26 season

Appearances and goals by club, season and competition
Club	Season	League			FA Cup		EFL Cup		Other		Total	
Club	Season	Division	Apps	Goals	Apps	Goals	Apps	Goals	Apps	Goals	Apps	Goals
Walsall	2014–15	League One	1	0	0	0	0	0	0	0	1	0
Walsall	2015–16	League One	10	2	1	0	1	0	1 (Note: Appearance(s) in EFL Trophy)	0	13	2
Walsall	2016–17	League One	30	1	1	0	1	0	4	0	36	1
Walsall	Total		41	3	2	0	2	0	5	0	50	3
Barwell (loan)	2013–14	NPL Premier Division	12	1	0	0	—		0	0	12	1
Swindon Town	2017–18	League Two	21	2	2	0	0	0	3	1	26	3
Mansfield Town	2018–19	League Two	39	3	2	0	0	0	4	0	45	3
Mansfield Town	2019–20	League Two	22	1	2	0	0	0	3	0	27	1
Mansfield Town	Total		61	4	4	0	0	0	7	0	72	4
Barnet	2020–21	National League	15	0	1	0	—		0	0	16	0
Solihull Moors	2021–22	National League	7	0	0	0	—		0	0	7	0
Solihull Moors	2022–23	National League	0	0	0	0	—		0	0	0	0
Solihull Moors	Total		7	0	0	0	0	0	0	0	7	0
Kidderminster Harriers (loan)	2021–22	National League North	6	0	1	0	—		0	0	7	0
Brackley Town (loan)	2022–23	National League North	9	0	0	0	—		0	0	9	0
Kidderminster Harriers	2023–24	National League	18	1	1	0	—		0	0	19	1
Hereford	2024–25	National League North	40	2	3	0	—		1 (Note: Appearance in FA Trophy)	0	44	2
Hereford	2025–26	National League North	30	1	2	0	—		1	0	33	1
Hereford	Total		70	3	5	0	0	0	2	0	77	3
Career total			260	14	16	0	2	0	17	1	295	15
