= Omari Sterling-James =

Saint Kitts and Nevis footballer (born 1993)

Personal information
- Full name: Omari Shaquil Jabari Sterling-James
- Date of birth: 15 September 1993 (age 33)
- Place of birth: Birmingham, England
- Height: 5 ft 10 in (1.77 m)
- Position: Winger

Team information
- Current team: Hednesford Town

Youth career
- Birmingham City

Senior career*
Years	Team	Apps	(Gls)
2012–2013	Alvechurch	33	(13)
2013–2014	Redditch United	?	(13)
2014–2016	Cheltenham Town	22	(1)
2015	→ Oxford City (loan)	17	(1)
2016	→ Gloucester City (loan)	14	(2)
2016–2017	Solihull Moors	42	(9)
2017–2020	Mansfield Town	14	(0)
2018	→ Solihull Moors (loan)	8	(1)
2019	→ Brackley Town (loan)	9	(0)
2020	→ Kettering Town (loan)	3	(1)
2020–2022	Kidderminster Harriers	56	(13)
2022–2024	Ebbsfleet United	59	(2)
2024–2025	Alvechurch	17	(1)
2025	Rushall Olympic	11	(0)
2025	Hereford	25	(5)
2026–	Hednesford Town	16	(8)

International career^{‡}
2017–	Saint Kitts and Nevis	39	(5)
Medal record
Men's football
Representing Saint Kitts and Nevis
FIFA Series
Bronze medal – third place	2026 Indonesia
- * Club domestic league appearances and goals as of 11:45, 1 January 2026 (UTC) ‡ National team caps and goals as of 16:52, 17 November 2026 (UTC)

Omari Shaquil Jabari Sterling-James (born 15 September 1993) is a footballer who plays as a winger or forward for National League North club Hednesford Town and the Saint Kitts and Nevis national team.

He previously played in the Football League for Cheltenham Town and Mansfield Town, and in non-League football for Alvechurch, Redditch United, Oxford City, Gloucester City, Solihull Moors, Brackley Town and Kettering Town and in 2021 he signed for Ebbsfleet United. Born in England, Sterling-James plays international football for Saint Kitts and Nevis.

== Career ==
Sterling-James began his career with Birmingham City, and was released in the 2012 summer. Shortly after he moved to Midland Football Alliance club Alvechurch, and scored 11 goals in his first season.

In September 2013 Sterling-James moved to Redditch United of the Southern League. He appeared regularly with the side, also scoring 13 goals during the whole campaign.

During a trial with League Two club Cheltenham Town, Sterling-James impressed in the pre-season friendlies and on 21 July 2014, he signed a six-month deal.

He made his professional debut on 12 August in the League Cup, as a late substitute in a 2–0 loss away to Brighton & Hove Albion. In December, he signed an extended deal to run until June 2016. He made 22 league appearances, scoring once, in Cheltenham's 2014–15 season, at the end of which the team were relegated to the National League.

Sterling-James spent the first half of the following season on loan at Oxford City of the National League South. In December 2015, Cheltenham confirmed that he was one of seven players whose contracts would not be renewed. On his return to his parent club, he made one appearance, in the FA Trophy, before joining National League North club Gloucester City on 4 February 2016 on loan until the end of the season.

Sterling-James signed for Solihull Moors, newly promoted to the National League, in July 2016. He scored, and was named man of the match, on his debut in a 3–1 victory over Sutton United. At the end of December he signed a new contract, and he finished the season with 9 goals from 46 appearances.

Although Moors wanted to keep Sterling-James at the club, he was determined to return to the Football League, and he signed for League Two club Mansfield Town on a free transfer. By mid-January 2018, he had failed to score in twenty appearances, only two of which were league starts, and he rejoined Solihull Moors on 22 March on loan until the end of the season. He played in three more Mansfield matches before a proposed loan move to Boston United fell through and he finished the 2018–19 season on loan to Brackley Town of the National League South, where he played little. On his return to Mansfield he again struggled for game time, joined Kettering Town on loan shortly before the National League was suspended because of the COVID-19 pandemic, and was released when his contract expired.

Sterling-James signed for Kidderminster Harriers in September 2020, He played in all but one of their National League North matches before the season was ended early because of COVID-19. He was a regular in Kidderminster's side in 2021–22, and contributed to their FA Cup run: entering at the second qualifying round, they beat Championship team Reading to reach the fourth round, in which they led Premier League team West Ham United until stoppage time before losing in extra time.

In June 2022, Sterling-James joined National League South club Ebbsfleet United. During his first season at the club, they were promoted to the National League as champions. He departed the club upon the expiration of his contract at the end of the 2023–24 season.

In July 2024, Sterling-James returned to his first senior club, Southern League Premier Division Central club Alvechurch. The following January, he moved to National League North club Rushall Olympic.

On 19 March 2025, Sterling-James joined fellow National League North club Hereford until the end of the season. On 10 June 2025, he renewed his stay with the club for the forthcoming season. On 1 January 2026, Hereford announced he had left to join Northern Premier League Premier Division club Hednesford Town for an undisclosed fee.

== International career ==
Sterling-James received his first international call-up to the Saint Kitts and Nevis national team for friendly against Armenia and Georgia on 4 and 7 June 2017. He played in both games – both defeats, He scored his first goal for Saint Kitts and Nevis in a 10–0 win against Saint Martin in the 2019–20 CONCACAF Nations League qualifying rounds.

== Career statistics ==
As of match played 6 December 2025

Appearances and goals by club, season and competition
Club	Season	League			FA Cup		League Cup		Other		Total	
Club	Season	Division	Apps	Goals	Apps	Goals	Apps	Goals	Apps	Goals	Apps	Goals
Cheltenham Town	2014–15	League Two	22	1	0	0	1	0	1 (Note: Appearance(s) in Football League Trophy)	0	24	1
Cheltenham Town	2015–16	National League	0	0	—		—		1 (Note: Appearance(s) in FA Trophy)	0	1	0
Cheltenham Town	Total		22	1	0	0	1	0	2	0	25	1
Oxford City (loan)	2015–16	National League South	17	1	2	2	—		0	0	19	3
Gloucester City (loan)	2015–16	National League North	14	2	—		—		—		14	2
Solihull Moors	2016–17	National League	42	9	4	0	—		0	0	46	9
Mansfield Town	2017–18	League Two	13	0	2	0	1	0	4 (Note: Appearance(s) in EFL Trophy)	0	20	0
Mansfield Town	2018–19	League Two	0	0	1	0	0	0	1	0	2	0
Mansfield Town	2019–20	League Two	8	1	1	0	1	1	3	2	13	4
Mansfield Town	Total		21	1	4	0	2	1	8	2	35	4
Solihull Moors (loan)	2017–18	National League	8	1	—		—		0	0	8	1
Brackley Town (loan)	2018–19	National League South	8	0	—		—		2 (Note: One appearance in FA Trophy, one in National League South play-offs)	0	10	0
Kettering Town (loan)	2019–20	National League North	3	1	—		—		—		3	1
Kidderminster Harriers	2020–21	National League North	14	4	1	0	—		1	0	16	4
Kidderminster Harriers	2021–22	National League North	38	9	6	0	—		2	0	46	9
Kidderminster Harriers	Total		52	13	7	0	—		3	0	62	13
Ebbsfleet United	2022–23	National League South	39	1	3	0	—		0	0	42	1
Ebbsfleet United	2023–24	National League	20	1	2	0	—		0	0	22	1
Ebbsfleet United	Total		59	2	5	0	—		0	0	64	2
Alvechurch	2024–25	Southern Premier Central	17	1	1	0	—		5 (Note: Two appearances in FA Trophy; two appearances, one goal in Worcestershire Senior Cup; one appearance in Birmingham Senior Cup)	1	23	2
Rushall Olympic	2024–25	National League North	11	0	—		—		—		11	0
Hereford	2024–25	National League North	7	1	—		—		0	0	7	1
Hereford	2025–26	National League North	18	4	3	1	—		1	0	22	5
Hereford	Total		25	5	3	1	—		1	0	29	6
Hednesford Town	2025–26	NPL Premier Division	0	0	—		—		0	0	0	0
Career total			299	37	23	2	3	1	21	3	346	43

=== International goals ===
Scores and results list Saint Kitts and Nevis' goal tally first. Score column lists the score after each Sterling-James goal.

No.	Date	Venue	Opponent	Score	Result	Competition
1.	14 October 2018	Raymond E. Guishard Technical Centre, The Valley, Anguilla	Saint Martin	6–0	10–0	2019–20 CONCACAF Nations League qualification
2.	10 October 2019	Isidoro Beaton Stadium, Belmopan, Belize	Belize	1–0	4–0	2019–20 CONCACAF Nations League B
3.	27 March 2021	Thomas Robinson Stadium, Nassau, Bahamas	Bahamas	4–0	4–0	2022 FIFA World Cup qualification
4.	9 June 2022	Stadion Rignaal Jean Francisca, Brievengat, Curaçao	Aruba	2–0	3–2	2022 FIFA World Cup qualification
5.	30 March 2026	Gelora Bung Karno Stadium, Jakarta, Indonesia	Solomon Islands	1–0	4–2	2026 FIFA Series

== Honours ==
Ebbsfleet United

- National League South: 2023–24

Hednesford Town

- Northern Premier League play-offs: 2026

Saint Kitts and Nevis

- FIFA Series third place: 2026
