= Tyler Walker (footballer) =

English footballer (born 1996)

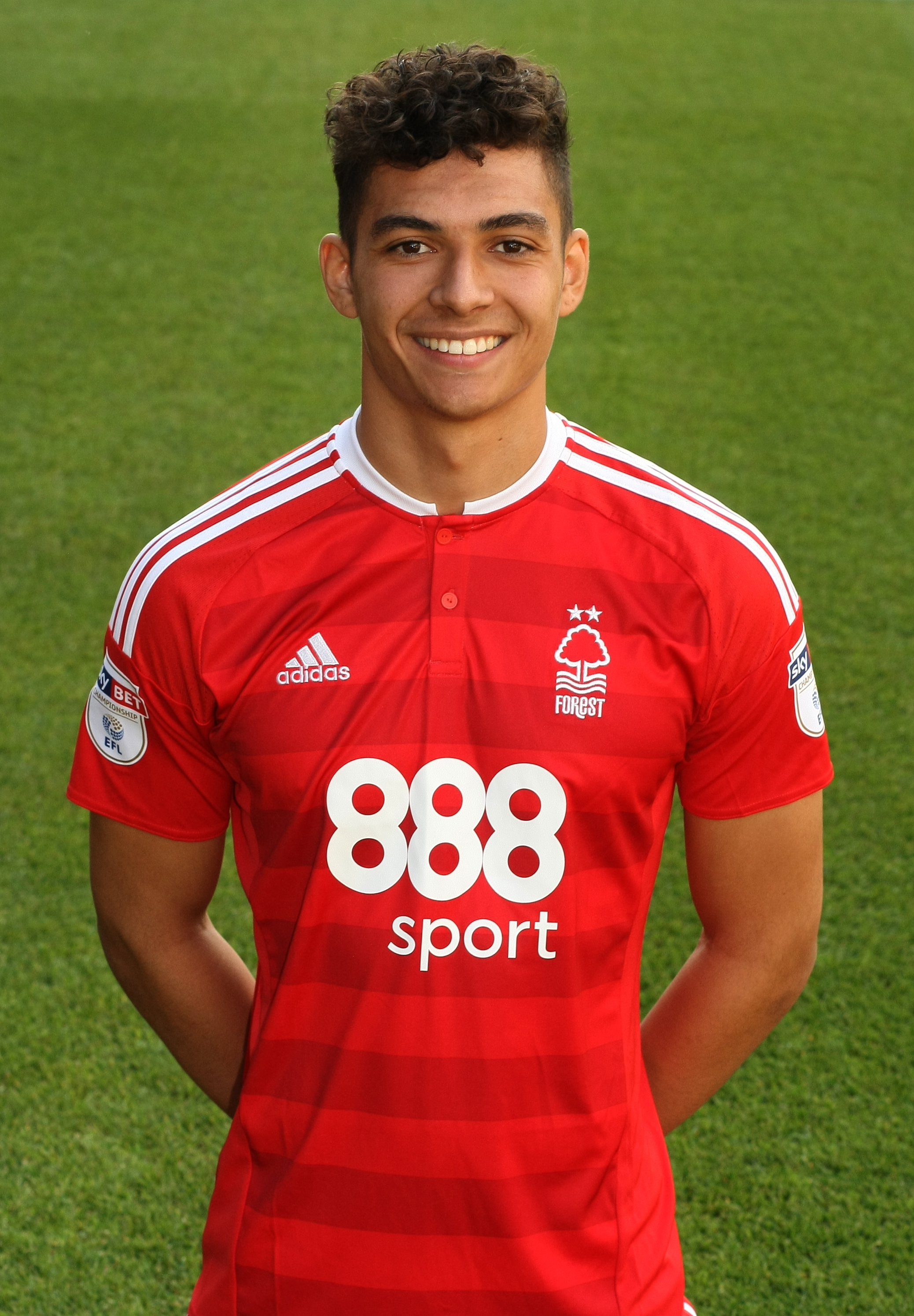
- Walker with Nottingham Forest in 2016

Personal information
- Full name: Tyler J. Andrew Walker
- Date of birth: 17 October 1996 (age 30)
- Place of birth: Nottingham, England
- Height: 5 ft 10 in (1.79 m)
- Position: Forward

Team information
- Current team: Penybont
- Number: 23

Youth career
- 2006–2015: Nottingham Forest

Senior career*
Years	Team	Apps	(Gls)
2015–2020	Nottingham Forest	40	(5)
2016	→ Burton Albion (loan)	6	(1)
2016–2017	→ Stevenage (loan)	8	(3)
2017	→ Port Vale (loan)	6	(2)
2018	→ Bolton Wanderers (loan)	5	(0)
2018–2019	→ Mansfield Town (loan)	44	(22)
2019–2020	→ Lincoln City (loan)	29	(14)
2020–2023	Coventry City	68	(10)
2022	→ Portsmouth (loan)	15	(1)
2023–2025	Lincoln City	6	(0)
2025	→ Wealdstone (loan)	8	(1)
2025–2026	Barrow	20	(2)
2026–	Penybont	15	(6)

International career
2015–2016	England U20	7	(2)
- * Club domestic league appearances and goals as of 7 November 2026 (UTC)

Tyler J. Andrew Walker (born 17 October 1996) is an English professional footballer who plays as a forward for Cymru Premier club Penybont. He is the son of former England defender Des Walker.

An England under-20 international, he made his first-team debut for hometown club Nottingham Forest in March 2015. He has played on loan at Burton Albion, Stevenage, Port Vale, Bolton Wanderers, Mansfield Town, and Lincoln City, and was named on the EFL League Two PFA Team of the Year for the 2018–19 season whilst with Mansfield. He was sold to Coventry City in August 2020 and joined Portsmouth on loan in January 2022. He joined Lincoln City on a free transfer in July 2023. He was loaned to Wealdstone in March 2025. He signed with Barrow in June 2025 and moved on to Welsh club Penybont in August 2026.

== Club career ==
=== Nottingham Forest ===
==== 2014–15 season ====
Walker made his professional debut for Nottingham Forest in the Championship as a substitute for Chris Burke in the 92nd minute of a 2–0 win over Rotherham United on 18 March 2015. Walker's first professional goal followed on 7 April in a 2–2 draw with Brentford at Griffin Park after he entered the game as a first-half substitute, on only his fourth first-team appearance. He signed a four-year contract with Forest in June 2015.

==== 2015–16 season ====
Owing much to a shortage of strikers and manager Dougie Freedman's willingness to give youth an opportunity, Walker played some games at the beginning of Forest's 2015–16 season. This included a start in the League Cup, a 4–3 defeat by Walsall at the City Ground on 11 August; a game in which he scored his second goal in professional football. On 24 March, Walker joined League One club Burton Albion on loan until the end of the 2015–16 season, where he would link-up with former Forest striker and Burton manager Nigel Clough. Walker made his Burton debut four days later as a half-time substitute in a 2–0 defeat at Millwall. In 'The Brewers' following game on 2 April, he came off the bench to score an injury-time equaliser in a 1–1 draw with Bury at the Pirelli Stadium. He returned to Forest at the end of the season having made six appearances for Burton Albion, scoring one goal.

==== 2016–17 season ====
In August 2016, new Forest manager Philippe Montanier stated that he could not assess Walker due to an injury that left him unable to play a part in pre-season. On 31 August, Walker signed on loan with EFL League Two side Stevenage for the remainder of the 2016–17 season. He made his debut in a 6–1 win over Hartlepool United at Broadhall Way on 2 September; he scored a brace in the match, the first of which was an overhead kick from close range – this performance earned him a place on the EFL team of the week. On 4 October, Walker scored on his debut in the EFL Trophy in a 2–2 draw with Brighton & Hove Albion's U-23 side. Having scored four goals in his first six games for 'The Boro', Walker missed a home game against Plymouth Argyle on 8 October after picking up a "freak injury" in training. He eventually made his return from injury as a substitute in a 4–2 home defeat to Colchester United on 31 December. Speaking after the match, manager Darren Sarll admitted that he "forgot just how good" Walker was.

Walker's loan spell with Stevenage ended earlier than planned, as Forest recalled the player on 13 January intending to secure him with a loan move to a League One club. Four days after his recall from Stevenage, Walker joined League One side Port Vale on loan until the end of the 2016–17 season. He scored the opening goal on his debut with a "superb 20 yards (18 m) strike" for 'The Valiants', before also going on to win a penalty in a 2–2 draw with Bury at Vale Park on 20 January. Walker's poor luck with injuries continued, however, as he sustained a knee ligament injury the following month which caretaker manager Michael Brown said would keep him out of action for the rest of the season.

==== 2017–18 season ====
Ahead of the 2017–18 season, Forest manager Mark Warburton, who had been appointed as Montanier's permanent successor in March 2017, suggested that Walker would be involved with the first-team, claiming that he had "benefited from being in and around the first team squad here this summer" and that "other players need to go out on loan". On 23 August, Walker came off the bench to score the winning goal in extra time of a 3–2 victory over Newcastle United at St James' Park in the second round of the EFL Cup. After the game Warburton confirmed in a post-match interview that Walker would remain at Forest for the season. He said: "We've had a host of clubs queuing up for Tyler Walker's services but he'll stay with us because of the reasons you've seen tonight. He's worked tirelessly to recover from injury, had a brilliant pre-season and that resulted in the quality of performance you've seen this evening." On 4 November, he scored the first brace of his senior career in a 4–0 home win over Queens Park Rangers, earning himself a mention in the EFL team of the week. On 28 November, Walker signed a new contract at Forest, due to expire in 2021.

On 31 January 2018, Walker joined fellow Championship side Bolton Wanderers on loan for the rest of the 2017–18 season. He made his Wanderers début in their 1–0 victory over Bristol City, starting the match and lasting 58 minutes before being substituted; he was replaced by fellow Forest loanee Zach Clough. However, he featured just five times for the "Trotters" as manager Phil Parkinson instead demoted both Walker and Clough to playing for the youth team.

==== 2018–19 season ====
On 29 June 2018, Walker joined League Two side Mansfield Town on a season-long loan. On 4 August, he scored 12 minutes into his debut for the "Stags" in a 3–0 win over Newport County at Field Mill. He scored a first-half hat-trick ten days later as Mansfield recorded a 6–1 home victory over Accrington Stanley in the first round of the EFL Cup; manager David Flitcroft said that Walker was "pure class". He scored his 15th goal of the season during a 2–1 Boxing day victory over Bury, taking Mansfield into the automatic promotion places. His scoring tally resulted in speculation that Forest manager Aitor Karanka would recall him in the January transfer window. He was named on League Two's PFA Team of the Year for the 2018–19 campaign, alongside Mansfield teammate Krystian Pearce. He was named as man of the match in the play-off semi-final first-leg against Newport County, but had his penalty saved in the shootout at the end of the second leg as Mansfield were eliminated.

==== 2019–20 season ====
On 2 August 2019, Walker joined League One side Lincoln City on loan for the 2019–20 season. Manager Danny Cowley said that "he's been on our wish list forever." After scoring 16 goals in 34 games for the "Imps", Walker was recalled to parent club Nottingham Forest by manager Sabri Lamouchi on 30 January. He was then restricted to appearances from the substitutes bench at Forest, though did manage to score against league leaders Leeds United on 8 February. He was cited as being the "next in line" by star striker Lewis Grabban.

=== Coventry City ===
On 28 August 2020, Walker joined newly promoted EFL Championship side Coventry City on a three-year deal for an undisclosed fee. Manager Mark Robins said he had monitored Walker for some years. He scored on his debut for Coventry in a 1–0 EFL Cup win at Milton Keynes Dons on 5 September. He scored his first league goal for Coventry in a 3–2 defeat at Watford on 7 November. He scored eight goals from 33 appearances in the 2020–21 season. Speaking in June 2022, Robins said that "we will just wipe the slate clean" following Walker's unsuccessful loan spell at Portsmouth. Walker suffered a tore anterior cruciate ligament (ACL) in October 2022. He made 19 appearances in the 2022–23 campaign, scoring one goal, and was released upon the expiry of his contract.

==== Portsmouth (loan) ====
On 18 January 2022, Walker joined League One side Portsmouth on loan until the end of the 2021–22 season after being signed by former Lincoln manager Danny Cowley. The loan spell was largely disappointing as he scored just one goal in nine starts and six substitute appearances for "Pompey" and was an unused substitute in the final six matches of the campaign despite being the highest paid player at Fratton Park. Jordan Cross of the Portsmouth News wrote that "Walker will go down as one of the worst and most expensive loan mistakes seen at Pompey in recent years".

=== Lincoln City ===
On 12 July 2023, he joined Lincoln City permanently on a free transfer on a two-year deal; Jez George, the club's director of football, said that "this is a football decision" from Walker that did not risk "compromising our wage structure". Head coach Mark Kennedy said that "with Ben House, he gives us two outstanding centre forwards". On 5 August 2023, he made his permanent Lincoln City debut, starting against Bolton Wanderers. However, just five games later he was ruled out for eight weeks with a hamstring injury. On 7 December, it was confirmed that Walker suffered a recurrence of the hamstring problem and was likely to miss the rest of the 2023–24 season.

==== Wealdstone (loan) ====
On 14 March 2025, Walker joined Wealdstone of the National League on loan for the remainder of the 2024–25 season as Lincoln's director of football Jez George allowed him to opportunity to find regular football following his recovery from a series of injuries. His wages were funded by the Wealdstone FC Supporters Club. He was released upon the expiry of his contract after returning to Lincoln.

=== Barrow ===
On 30 June 2025, Walker agreed a one-year deal – with the option of a further year – with League Two club Barrow. He made his debut on the opening day of the season, coming off the bench in a 1–0 defeat against Chesterfield. He scored his first goal in the EFL in two years by opening the scoring in a 2–1 win against Notts County on 16 August. The 2025–26 season proved to be a disaster for Walker and Barrow as he had more managers (four) than goals (two) – Andy Whing, Paul Gallagher, Dino Maamria and Sam Foley. Barrow were relegated from League Two, and Walker was released upon the expiry of his contract. He was part of the 45-man Professional Footballers' Association (PFA) free agent squad in July 2026.

=== Penybont ===
On 2 August 2026, Walker signed with Cymru Premier club Penybont.

== International career ==
On 5 September 2015, Walker made his debut for the England under-20s and scored a brace in a 5–0 win over the Czech Republic.

== Style of play ==
Walker is a pacey and athletic forward. Danny Cowley nicknamed him "the Ghost" for his ability to appear from nowhere to score a goal. He is a natural finisher, however, his work rate has been criticised.

== Personal life ==
Walker is the son of former Forest and England defender Des Walker and elder brother of former Queens Park Rangers striker Lewis Walker. He is of Jamaican descent through his father.

== Career statistics ==
As of 3 April 2026

Club statistics
Club	Season	League			National Cup (Note: Includes FA Cup, Welsh Cup)		League Cup (Note: Includes EFL Cup)		Other		Total	
Club	Season	Division	Apps	Goals	Apps	Goals	Apps	Goals	Apps	Goals	Apps	Goals
Nottingham Forest	2014–15	Championship	7	1	0	0	0	0	—		7	1
Nottingham Forest	2015–16	Championship	14	0	0	0	1	1	—		15	1
Nottingham Forest	2016–17	Championship	0	0	0	0	0	0	—		0	0
Nottingham Forest	2017–18	Championship	12	3	1	0	3	1	—		16	4
Nottingham Forest	2018–19	Championship	0	0	0	0	0	0	—		0	0
Nottingham Forest	2019–20	Championship	7	1	0	0	0	0	—		7	1
Nottingham Forest	Total		40	5	1	0	4	2	0	0	45	7
Burton Albion (loan)	2015–16	League One	6	1	—		—		—		6	1
Stevenage (loan)	2016–17	League Two	8	3	0	0	—		1 (Note: Appearance(s) in EFL Trophy)	1	9	4
Port Vale (loan)	2016–17	League One	6	2	—		—		—		6	2
Bolton Wanderers (loan)	2017–18	Championship	5	0	—		—		—		5	0
Mansfield Town (loan)	2018–19	League Two	44	22	2	0	2	3	4 (Note: Two appearances in EFL Trophy and Two appearances in 2019 EFL League Two play-offs)	1	50	26
Lincoln City (loan)	2019–20	League One	29	14	2	1	1	0	2	1	34	16
Coventry City	2020–21	Championship	31	7	0	0	2	1	—		33	8
Coventry City	2021–22	Championship	19	2	0	0	1	1	—		20	3
Coventry City	2022–23	Championship	18	1	0	0	1	0	—		19	1
Coventry City	Total		68	10	0	0	4	2	0	0	72	12
Portsmouth (loan)	2021–22	League One	15	1	—		—		—		15	1
Lincoln City	2023–24	League One	6	0	0	0	1	0	0	0	7	0
Lincoln City	2024–25	League One	0	0	0	0	0	0	1	0	1	0
Lincoln City	Total		6	0	0	0	1	0	1	0	8	0
Wealdstone (loan)	2024–25	National League	8	1	—		—		—		8	1
Barrow	2025–26	League Two	20	2	0	0	1	0	2	0	23	2
Penybont	2026–27	Cymru Premier	0	0	0	0	—		0	0	0	0
Career totals			255	61	5	1	13	7	10	3	283	72

== Honours ==
Individual

- PFA Team of the Year: 2018–19 League Two
