= Nyle Blake =

English footballer (born 1999)

Personal information
- Date of birth: 14 March 1999 (age 27)
- Place of birth: Nottingham, England
- Position: Forward

Team information
- Current team: Stamford

Youth career
- –2018: Mansfield Town

Senior career*
Years	Team	Apps	(Gls)
2018–2019	Mansfield Town	0	(0)
2019	→ Matlock Town (loan)		
2019–2020	Alfreton Town	15	(1)
2020	→ Frickley Athletic (loan)	11	(4)
2020–2021	Frickley Athletic	8	(2)
2021	Belper Town	0	(0)
2021	Carlton Town	0	(0)
2021	Hyde United	2	(0)
2021	Gainsborough Trinity	8	(0)
2021–2022	Frickley Athletic	10	(1)
2022–2023	Stamford	1	(0)
2023–2025	Anstey Nomads	28	(19)
2025	Basford United	?	(?)
- * Club domestic league appearances and goals as of 13:23, 2ND April 2026

Nyle Blake (born 14 March 1999) is an English professional footballer who plays as a forward for Stamford.

== Playing career ==
Blake came through the Mansfield Town Academy to sign professional forms with the "Stags" in May 2018, having helped the youth-team to win the EFL Youth Alliance North East title. He scored upon making his first-team debut on 13 November, helping Mansfield to record a 3–2 victory over Scunthorpe United in an EFL Trophy group stage game at Field Mill. Blake commented that "any young person's dream is to score on their debut so I was over the moon to get it".

Following a brief spell at Alfreton Town, Blake joined Northern Premier League side Frickley Athletic on loan until the end of the 2019/20 season. After being used in a number of positions, including right back, right wing and midfield, Blake signed a contract with the club in Summer 2020 to remain in West Yorkshire for the 2020/21 season.

He signed for Northern Premier League Division One Midlands side Carlton Town on a free transfer in August 2021. After spells at Hyde United and Gainsborough Trinity, he re-joined Frickley Athletic in November 2021.

== Style of play ==
Speaking in May 2018, Mansfield Town Academy manager John Dempster stated that "[Blake has] great potential. His ability to score and set up goals is one thing, but his raw attributes and fitness levels have really impressed. He can play at centre-forward but also anywhere on the right, including right wing-back – he has the attributes to do so." The club website stated that he "likes to play 'off the shoulder' of the defence and enjoys making runs in behind the back line" and "has electric pace and a real eye for goal, meaning he has all the attributes to enable him to play the lone striker role".

== Statistics ==
Club	Season	League			FA Cup		EFL Cup		Other		Total	
Club	Season	Division	Apps	Goals	Apps	Goals	Apps	Goals	Apps	Goals	Apps	Goals
Mansfield Town	2018–19	EFL League Two	0	0	0	0	0	0	1 (Note: Appearance/s in the EFL Trophy)	1	1	1
Career total			0	0	0	0	0	0	1	1	1	1
