= Lewis Gibbens =

English footballer

Personal information
- Full name: Lewis Joseph Gibbens
- Date of birth: 12 November 2000 (age 25)
- Place of birth: Leicester, England
- Positions: Full-back; centre-back

Youth career
- Mansfield Town

Senior career*
Years	Team	Apps	(Gls)
2018–2020	Mansfield Town	1	(0)
2018	→ Boston United (loan)	8	(1)
2019	→ Boston United (loan)	2	(0)
2020–2021	Boston United	0	(0)
2021-2022	Worksop Town	26	(7)
2022-	Anstey Nomads	97	(9)
- * Club domestic league appearances and goals as of 11:05, 18 August 2020 (UTC)

Lewis Joseph Gibbens (born 12 November 2000) is an English former professional footballer.

== Career ==
Gibbens was a member of the Mansfield under-18 side that won the EFL Youth Alliance North East Division title in the 2017/18 campaign and in May 2018 was rewarded with the youth player of the season award.

Gibbens made his football league debut for Mansfield on 25 August 2018 against Macclesfield Town. On 13 September 2019, Gibbens was loaned out to Boston United for the second time.

Gibbens joined Boston United on a one-year contract in August 2020. On loan to Worksop Town 2020/2021 season
