= 2017–18 Mansfield Town F.C. season =

Mansfield Town
2017–18 season
- Owner: John Radford
- Chief Executive: Carolyn Radford
- Manager: Steve Evans (until 27 February 2018); David Flitcroft (from 1 March 2018)
- Stadium: Field Mill
- League Two: 8th
- FA Cup: Third round
- EFL Cup: First round

The 2017–18 season was Mansfield Town's 121st season in their history and their fifth consecutive season in League Two.

== Results ==
=== Friendlies ===
As of 26 June 2017, Mansfield Town have announced eight pre-season friendlies. On 1 November 2017, it was announced Mansfield Town would face Clipstone.

| Match | Date | Opponent | Venue | Result | Scorers | Report |
|---|---|---|---|---|---|---|
| 1 | 6 July 2017 | Malta Select XI | A | 5–0 | Rose 14', Digby 23', Atkinson 55', Angol (2) 62' (pen.), 76' | Report |
| 2 | 15 July 2017 | Sheffield Wednesday | H | 2–3 | Taft 32', Bennett 81' | Report |
| 3 | 18 July 2017 | Stocksbridge Park Steels | A | 4–0 | Rose (2), Hamilton (2) | Report |
| 4 | 19 July 2017 | Middlesbrough | H | 2–2 | Howson (o.g.), Angol | Report |
| 5 | 22 July 2017 | Nottingham Forest | H | 0–4 | | Report |
| 6 | 25 July 2017 | Gainsborough Trinity | A | 4–0 | Sterling James (2) 8', 61', Hamilton 38', Potter 75' | Report |
| 7 | 25 July 2017 | Matlock Town | A | 4–0 | Angol (2), Atkinson, Mellis | Report |
| 8 | 29 July 2017 | Alfreton Town | A | 2–0 | Rose 80', Mellis 87' | Report |

=== League Two ===
The League Two fixtures were released on 21 June 2017.

| Match | Date | Opponent | Venue | Result | Attendance | Scorers | Report |
|---|---|---|---|---|---|---|---|
| 1 | 5 August 2017 | Crewe Alexandra | A | 2–2 | 4,933 | Rose 55', Mirfin 66' | Report |
| 2 | 12 August 2017 | Forest Green Rovers | H | 2–0 | 3,826 | Rose 51', Anderson 57' | Report |
| 3 | 19 August 2017 | Accrington Stanley | A | 1–2 | 1,645 | Angol 25' | Report |
| 4 | 26 August 2017 | Luton Town | H | 2–2 | 4,665 | Bennett 23', Angol 71' | Report |
| 5 | 2 September 2017 | Carlisle United | A | 1–1 | 4,677 | Butcher 58' | Report |
| 6 | 9 September 2017 | Grimsby Town | H | 4–1 | 4,625 | Angol (2) 34' (pen.), 80' (pen.), Pearce 54', Osborne 64' (o.g.) | Report |
| 7 | 12 September 2017 | Wycombe Wanderers | H | 0–0 | 2,938 | | Report |
| 8 | 16 September 2017 | Lincoln City | A | 1–0 | 9,563 | Rose 61' | Report |
| 9 | 23 September 2017 | Cambridge United | H | 2–1 | 3,814 | Mellis 65' (pen.), Rose 87' | Report |
| 10 | 26 September 2017 | Cheltenham Town | A | 0–3 | 2,480 | | Report |
| 11 | 30 September 2017 | Notts County | H | 3–1 | 7,072 | Rose (2) 47', 59', Duffy 63' (o.g.) | Report |
| 12 | 7 October 2017 | Colchester United | A | 0–2 | 3,262 | | Report |
| 13 | 14 October 2017 | Swindon Town | H | 1–3 | 4,081 | Rose 90+1' | Report |
| 14 | 17 October 2017 | Barnet | A | 1–1 | 1,262 | Butcher 45+2' | Report |
| 15 | 21 October 2017 | Newport County | A | 1–1 | 3,146 | Rose 22' | Report |
| 16 | 28 October 2017 | Exeter City | H | 1–1 | 3,608 | Hemmings 18' | Report |
| 17 | 11 November 2017 | Coventry City | A | 1–0 | 8,410 | MacDonald 84' | Report |
| 18 | 18 November 2017 | Stevenage | H | 1–0 | 3,353 | Hemmings 24' | Report |
| 19 | 21 November 2017 | Port Vale | A | 4–0 | 3,878 | Diamond (2) 43', 52', Rose 54', Hemmings 63' | Report |
| 20 | 25 November 2017 | Chesterfield | H | 2–2 | 7,525 | White 26', Diamond 88' | Report |
| 21 | 9 December 2017 | Crawley Town | A | 0–2 | 1,791 | | Report |
| 22 | 16 December 2017 | Yeovil Town | H | 0–0 | 3,032 | | Report |
| 23 | 23 December 2017 | Morecambe | H | 2–1 | 3,058 | Hemmings 8', Rose 88' | Report |
| 24 | 26 December 2017 | Grimsby Town | A | 1–1 | 5,704 | Angol 80' | Report |
| 25 | 30 December 2017 | Wycombe Wanderers | A | 2–1 | 4,227 | Potter 52', Angol 81' | Report |
| 26 | 1 January 2018 | Carlisle United | H | 3–1 | 3,632 | Hemmings 9', 75', Bennett 31' | Report |
| 27 | 13 January 2018 | Cambridge United | A | 0–0 | 4,324 | | Report |
| 28 | 20 January 2018 | Cheltenham Town | H | 3–2 | 3,483 | Hamilton (2) 35', 90+4', Hemmings 80' | Report |
| 29 | 27 January 2018 | Morecambe | A | 2–1 | 1,416 | Rose 70', Benning 90+4' | Report |
| 30 | 3 February 2018 | Barnet | H | 3–1 | 3,795 | MacDonald 42', Atkinson 55', Rose 70' | Report |
| 31 | 10 February 2018 | Swindon Town | A | 0–1 | 6,031 | | Report |
| 32 | 13 February 2018 | Newport County | H | 5–0 | 2,866 | Rose 6', Potter 9', 28', 61', MacDonald 34' | Report |
| 33 | 17 February 2018 | Exeter City | A | 1–0 | 3,680 | Rose 38' | Report |
| 34 | 24 February 2018 | Coventry City | H | 1–1 | 6,105 | Hemmings 16' | Report |
| 35 | 6 March 2018 | Lincoln City | H | 1–1 | 6,091 | Byrom 49' | Report |
| 36 | 10 March 2018 | Colchester United | H | 1–1 | 4,050 | Hemmings 22' | Report |
| 37 | 17 March 2018 | Notts County | A | 1–1 | 12,563 | Hemmings 90+9' (pen) | Report |
| 38 | 24 March 2018 | Forest Green Rovers | A | 0–2 | 2,287 | | Report |
| 39 | 31 March 2018 | Accrington Stanley | H | 0–1 | 5,053 | | Report |
| 40 | 2 April 2018 | Luton Town | A | 1–2 | 9,592 | Hemmings 34' | Report |
| 41 | 7 April 2018 | Crewe Alexandra | H | 3–4 | 3,480 | Angol 15', Hemmings 50', Miller 76' | Report |
| 42 | 10 April 2018 | Stevenage | A | 1–1 | 2,294 | Atkinson 51' | Report |
| 43 | 14 April 2018 | Chesterfield | A | 1–0 | 7,967 | Benning 67' | Report |
| 44 | 21 April 2018 | Port Vale | H | 1–1 | 4,210 | Howkins 73' (o.g.) | Report |
| 45 | 28 April 2018 | Yeovil Town | A | 3–2 | 3,500 | Angol (2) 48', 76', Hemmings 69' (pen) | Report |
| 46 | 5 May 2018 | Crawley Town | H | 1–1 | 4,734 | Hemmings 64' | Report |

==== League table ====
| Pos | Team | Pld | W | D | L | GF | GA | GD | Pts | Promotion, qualification or relegation |
|---|---|---|---|---|---|---|---|---|---|---|
| 6 | Coventry City (O, P) | 46 | 22 | 9 | 15 | 64 | 47 | +17 | 75 | Qualification for League Two play-offs (Note: Four teams play for one spot and promotion to EFL League One.) |
| 7 | Lincoln City | 46 | 20 | 15 | 11 | 64 | 48 | +16 | 75 | Qualification for League Two play-offs |
| 8 | Mansfield Town | 46 | 18 | 18 | 10 | 67 | 52 | +15 | 72 | |
| 9 | Swindon Town | 46 | 20 | 8 | 18 | 67 | 65 | +2 | 68 | |
| 10 | Carlisle United | 46 | 17 | 16 | 13 | 62 | 54 | +8 | 67 | |

Source: BBC Sport
Rules for classification: 1) Points; 2) Goal difference; 3) Number of goals scored
(O) Play-off winners; (P) Promoted

=== FA Cup ===
On 16 October 2017, Mansfield Town were drawn away to Shaw Lane in the first round. A second round home tie against Accrington Stanley or Guiseley was confirmed. Guiseley won that match 4–3 on penalties following a 1–1 scoreline (a.e.t.) to face Mansfield.

| Round | Date | Opponent | Venue | Result | Attendance | Scorers | Report |
|---|---|---|---|---|---|---|---|
| R1 | 4 November 2017 | Shaw Lane | A | 3–1 | 1,700 | Pearce 34', Rose (2) 73', 78' | Report |
| R2 | 2 December 2017 | Guiseley | H | 3–0 | 4,081 | Spencer 31', 52', 65'(pen.) | Report |
| R3 | 6 January 2018 | Cardiff City | A | 0–0 | 6,378 | | Report |
| R3 Replay | 16 January 2018 | Cardiff City | H | 1–4 | 5,746 | Rose 35' | Report |

=== EFL Cup ===
On 16 June 2017, Mansfield Town were drawn at home to Rochdale in the first round.

| Round | Date | Opponent | Venue | Result | Attendance | Scorers | Report |
|---|---|---|---|---|---|---|---|
| R1 | 8 August 2017 | Rochdale | H | 0–1 | 1,457 | | Report |

=== EFL Trophy ===
On 12 July 2017, Mansfield Town were drawn alongside Everton U23s, Lincoln City and Notts County in Northern Group G. After finishing as runners-up, Mansfield were drawn away to Blackpool in the second round.

| Pos | Lge | Team | Pld | W | PW | PL | L | GF | GA | GD | Pts | Qualification |
|---|---|---|---|---|---|---|---|---|---|---|---|---|
| 1 | L2 | Lincoln City (Q) | 3 | 3 | 0 | 0 | 0 | 7 | 3 | +4 | 9 | Round 2 |
| 2 | L2 | Mansfield Town (Q) | 3 | 2 | 0 | 0 | 1 | 4 | 4 | 0 | 6 | Round 2 |
| 3 | L2 | Notts County (E) | 3 | 1 | 0 | 0 | 2 | 4 | 5 | −1 | 3 | |
| 4 | ACA | Everton U21 (E) | 3 | 0 | 0 | 0 | 3 | 2 | 5 | −3 | 0 | |

Updated to match(es) played on 7 November 2017. Source: EFL.com
(E) Eliminated; (Q) Qualified to the phase indicated

| Match | Date | Opponent | Venue | Result | Attendance | Scorers | Report |
|---|---|---|---|---|---|---|---|
| Group Match 1 | 29 August 2017 | Lincoln City | H | 1–3 | 2,495 | Potter 8' | Report |
| Group Match 2 | 24 October 2017 | Notts County | A | 2–1 | 2,290 | Angol 1', Hamilton 73' | Report |
| Group Match 3 | 5 November 2017 | Everton U21s | H | 1–0 | 964 | Diamond 81' | Report |
| Second round | 6 December 2017 | Blackpool | A | 1–1 (4–5 p) | 587 | Butcher 88' | Report |

== Squad statistics ==
| No. | Pos. | Name | League Two | | FA Cup | | League Cup | | League Trophy | | Total | | Discipline | |
| No. | Pos. | Name | Apps | Goals | Apps | Goals | Apps | Goals | Apps | Goals | Apps | Goals | Yellow card | Red card |
|---|---|---|---|---|---|---|---|---|---|---|---|---|---|---|
| 1 | GK | (Republic of Ireland) Conrad Logan | 45 | 0 | 4 | 0 | 0 | 0 | 0 | 0 | 49 | 0 | 2 | 0 |
| 2 | DF | (England) Rhys Bennett | 34(4) | 2 | 3 | 0 | 1 | 0 | 1 | 0 | 39(4) | 2 | 5 | 1 |
| 3 | DF | (England) Mal Benning | 27(1) | 1 | 3 | 0 | 1 | 0 | 2 | 0 | 33(1) | 1 | 7 | 1 |
| 4 | DF | (England) Paul Digby | 10(5) | 0 | 0(1) | 0 | 1 | 0 | 4 | 0 | 15(6) | 0 | 3 | 0 |
| 5 | DF | (England) Krystian Pearce | 36(2) | 1 | 3 | 1 | 1 | 0 | 1 | 0 | 41(2) | 1 | 12 | 1 |
| 6 | DF | (Scotland) Zander Diamond | 18(2) | 3 | 2 | 0 | 0 | 0 | 1 | 1 | 21(2) | 3 | 2 | 0 |
| 7 | MF | (Scotland) Alex MacDonald | 40(1) | 3 | 4 | 0 | 0 | 0 | 1 | 0 | 45(1) | 0 | 8 | 0 |
| 8 | MF | (England) Jacob Mellis | 22(8) | 1 | 3 | 0 | 0 | 0 | 1 | 0 | 26(8) | 1 | 9 | 0 |
| 9 | FW | (England) Lee Angol | 16(13) | 9 | 1(1) | 0 | 0 | 0 | 3 | 1 | 20(14) | 10 | 9 | 0 |
| 10 | MF | (England) Paul Anderson | 24(9) | 1 | 4 | 0 | 1 | 0 | 1(1) | 0 | 30(10) | 1 | 1 | 0 |
| 11 | MF | (England) Will Atkinson | 24(15) | 2 | 1(2) | 0 | 1 | 0 | 2(1) | 0 | 28(18) | 2 | 4 | 0 |
| 12 | GK | (Austria) Bobby Olejnik | 1 | 0 | 0 | 0 | 1 | 0 | 4 | 0 | 6 | 0 | 0 | 0 |
| 14 | DF | (England) George Taft | 0 | 0 | 0 | 0 | 0 | 0 | 1 | 0 | 1 | 0 | 0 | 0 |
| 15 | FW | (England) Jimmy Spencer | 3(15) | 1 | 1(2) | 3 | 1 | 0 | 4 | 0 | 9(17) | 4 | 2 | 0 |
| 16 | DF | (England) Hayden White | 25(3) | 1 | 2 | 0 | 0 | 0 | 2 | 0 | 29(3) | 1 | 9 | 1 |
| 17 | MF | (England) Alfie Potter | 16(11) | 4 | 1(2) | 0 | 0(1) | 0 | 3(1) | 1 | 20(15) | 5 | 2 | 0 |
| 18 | DF | (England) David Mirfin | 12 | 1 | 0 | 0 | 1 | 0 | 0 | 0 | 13 | 1 | 2 | 0 |
| 19 | DF | (England) Johnny Hunt | 18 | 0 | 1 | 0 | 0 | 0 | 2 | 0 | 21 | 0 | 5 | 0 |
| 20 | MF | (England) Jack Thomas | 0(1) | 0 | 0 | 0 | 0 | 0 | 1(3) | 0 | 1(4) | 0 | 0 | 0 |
| 21 | MF | (Saint Kitts and Nevis) Omari Sterling-James | 2(11) | 0 | 0(2) | 0 | 1 | 0 | 3(1) | 0 | 6(14) | 0 | 3 | 0 |
| 22 | MF | (England) C. J. Hamilton | 28(5) | 2 | 4 | 0 | 0(1) | 0 | 1(2) | 1 | 33(8) | 3 | 1 | 0 |
| 23 | FW | (England) Kane Hemmings | 36(1) | 15 | 2 | 0 | 0 | 0 | 0(1) | 0 | 38(2) | 15 | 8 | 0 |
| 24 | MF | (England) Calum Butcher | 10(7) | 1 | 0(1) | 0 | 0 | 0 | 2 | 1 | 12(8) | 2 | 5 | 0 |
| 25 | MF | (Scotland) Adam King | 5(2) | 0 | 0 | 0 | 0 | 0 | 0 | 0 | 5(2) | 0 | 2 | 0 |
| 26 | MF | (England) Joel Byrom | 18(1) | 1 | 2 | 0 | 1 | 0 | 1 | 0 | 22(1) | 0 | 7 | 0 |
| 27 | MF | (England) Matt Penney | 0(2) | 0 | 0 | 0 | 0 | 0 | 0 | 0 | 0(2) | 0 | 0 | 0 |
| 31 | FW | (England) Ricky Miller | 0(8) | 1 | 0 | 0 | 0 | 0 | 0 | 0 | 0(8) | 1 | 2 | 0 |
| 32 | FW | (England) Danny Rose | 35(4) | 14 | 3 | 3 | 0(1) | 0 | 0(1) | 0 | 38(6) | 17 | 9 | 0 |
| 37 | FW | (Antigua and Barbuda) Zayn Hakeem | 0 | 0 | 0 | 0 | 0 | 0 | 0(1) | 0 | 0(1) | 0 | 0 | 0 |
| Own goals | | | — | 2 | — | 0 | — | 0 | — | 0 | — | 2 | — | |

== Transfers ==
=== Transfers in ===
| Date from | Position | Nationality | Name | From | Fee | Ref. |
|---|---|---|---|---|---|---|
| 1 July 2017 | CF | (England) | Lee Angol | Peterborough United | Undisclosed | |
| 1 July 2017 | RM | (England) | Paul Anderson | Northampton Town | Free | |
| 1 July 2017 | CM | (England) | Will Atkinson | Southend United | Free | |
| 1 July 2017 | CB | (Scotland) | Zander Diamond | Northampton Town | Free | |
| 1 July 2017 | CB | (England) | Paul Digby | Ipswich Town | Free | |
| 1 July 2017 | LB | (England) | Johnny Hunt | Chester | Free | |
| 1 July 2017 | GK | (Republic of Ireland) | Conrad Logan | Rochdale | Free | |
| 1 July 2017 | CM | (England) | Jacob Mellis | Bury | Free | |
| 1 July 2017 | CB | (England) | David Mirfin | Scunthorpe United | Free | |
| 1 July 2017 | GK | (Austria) | Bobby Olejnik | Exeter City | Free | |
| 1 July 2017 | CF | (England) | Jimmy Spencer | Plymouth Argyle | Free | |
| 1 July 2017 | RM | (Saint Kitts and Nevis) | Omari Sterling-James | Solihull Moors | Free | |
| 1 July 2017 | RB | (England) | Hayden White | Peterborough United | Undisclosed | |
| 31 August 2017 | DM | (England) | Calum Butcher | Millwall | Free | |

=== Transfers out ===
| Date from | Position | Nationality | Name | To | Fee | Ref. |
|---|---|---|---|---|---|---|
| 1 July 2017 | CF | (Martinique) | Yoann Arquin | Free agent | Released | |
| 1 July 2017 | RM | (England) | James Baxendale | Free agent | Released | |
| 1 July 2017 | CB | (England) | Lee Collins | Forest Green Rovers | Released | (Note: Lee Collins joined Forest Green Rovers following his release from the club.) |
| 1 July 2017 | CF | (England) | Matt Green | Lincoln City | Released | (Note: Matt Green joined Lincoln City following his release.) |
| 1 July 2017 | LM | (England) | Ashley Hemmings | Boston United | Released | (Note: Ashley Hemmings joined Boston United following his release.) |
| 1 July 2017 | CF | (Republic of Ireland) | Patrick Hoban | Dundalk | Released | (Note: Patrick Hoban joined Dundalk following his release.) |
| 1 July 2017 | RM | (England) | Kevan Hurst | Guiseley | Released | (Note: Kevan Hurst joined Guiseley following his release.) |
| 1 July 2017 | GK | (Denmark) | Brian Jensen | Crusaders | Released | (Note: Brian Jensen joined Crusaders following his release.) |
| 1 July 2017 | CM | (England) | Jamie McGuire | Coaching role | Released | (Note: Jamie McGuire accepted the offer to take a coaching role at the club following his release.) |
| 1 July 2017 | GK | (Scotland) | Scott Shearer | Oxford United | Released | (Note: Scott Shearer joined Oxford United following his release from the club.) |
| 1 July 2017 | CB | (England) | Corbin Shires | Free agent | Released | |

=== Loans in ===
| Start date | Position | Nationality | Name | From | End date | Ref. |
|---|---|---|---|---|---|---|
| 22 August 2017 | CF | (England) | Kane Hemmings | Oxford United | 30 June 2018 | |

=== Loans out ===
| Start date | Position | Nationality | Name | To | End date | Ref. |
|---|---|---|---|---|---|---|
| 14 September 2017 | CM | (England) | Jack Thomas | Boston United | 24 October 2017 | (Note: On 16 October, Jack Thomas extended his loan with Boston United for a further month.) (Note: On 24 October, Mansfield Town exercised the option to recall Jack Thomas.) |
