= 2016–17 Mansfield Town F.C. season =

Mansfield Town
2016–17 season
- Owner: John Radford
- Chief Executive: Carolyn Radford
- Manager: Adam Murray (until 14 November); Steve Evans (from 16 November)
- Stadium: Field Mill
- League Two: 12th
- FA Cup: First round (vs. Plymouth Argyle)
- League Cup: First round (vs. Blackburn Rovers)
- League Trophy: Quarter-final (vs. Wycombe Wanderers)
Home colours	Away colours

The 2016–17 season was Mansfield Town's 120th season in their history and their fourth consecutive season in League Two.

== Results ==
=== Pre-season friendlies ===
Match	Date	Opponent	Venue	Result	Scorers	Report
1	2 July 2016	Rainworth Miners Welfare	A	2–0	Baxendale 6', Yussuf 62'	Report
2	9 July 2016	Clipstone	A	2–2	M. Rose 34', Yussuf 52'	Report
3	9 July 2016	Carlton Town	A	4–3	Benning 30', Green (2) 41', 68', Law 72'	Report
4	13 July 2016	Matlock Town	A	0–0		Report
5	16 July 2016	Bolton Wanderers	H	2–1	D. Rose 11', Pearce 23'	Report
6	19 July 2016	Hull City	H	0–1		Report
7	23 July 2016	Alfreton Town	A	1–1	Green 5'	Report
8	26 July 2016	Mickleover Sports	A	0–1		Report
9	30 July 2016	Worksop Town	A	3–1	Collins 47', Clements 62', Benning 87'	Report

=== League Two ===
Match	Date	Opponent	Venue	Result	Attendance	Scorers	Report
1	6 August 2016	Newport County	A	3–2	2,790	Green 12', D. Rose 66', Hurst 90+3'	Report
2	13 August 2016	Cheltenham Town	H	1–1	2,884	M. Rose 49'	Report
3	16 August 2016	Yeovil Town	H	1–0	2,503	Green 64' (pen)	Report
4	20 August 2016	Plymouth Argyle	A	0–2	6,795		Report
5	27 August 2016	Leyton Orient	A	2–1	3,996	M. Rose 68', Green 89'	Report
6	3 September 2016	Cambridge United	H	0–0	2,981		Report
7	10 September 2016	Barnet	H	0–1	2,523		Report
8	17 September 2016	Hartlepool United	A	0–0	3,775		Report
9	24 September 2016	Grimsby Town	H	0–1	4,401		Report
10	27 September 2016	Accrington Stanley	A	1–1	1,134	Clements 31'	Report
11	1 October 2016	Crewe Alexandra	A	1–1	3,831	Hoban 51'	Report
12	8 October 2016	Notts County	H	3–1	5,763	Green (2) 54', 90+1' (pen), Henderson 90+4'	Report
13	15 October 2016	Wycombe Wanderers	H	1–1	2,898	Green 81'	Report
14	22 October 2016	Luton Town	A	1–1	7,787	Green 9'	Report
15	29 October 2016	Stevenage	H	1–2	2,716	Hoban 54'	Report
16	12 November 2016	Portsmouth	A	0–4	16,393		Report
17	19 November 2016	Crawley Town	H	3–1	2,984	Clements (2) 50', 60', Hoban 54'	Report
18	22 November 2016	Blackpool	H	1–0	2,801	D. Rose 90+3'	Report
19	26 November 2016	Carlisle United	A	2–5	4,822	Hoban 6', D. Rose 85'	Report
20	10 December 2016	Colchester United	H	0–0	3,398		Report
21	17 December 2016	Exeter City	A	0–2	3,626		Report
22	26 December 2016	Morecambe	H	0–1	3,237		Report
23	31 December 2016	Doncaster Rovers	H	1–1	5,042	Green 59'	Report
24	2 January 2017	Blackpool	A	1–0	2,948	Green 29'	Report
25	7 January 2017	Crewe Alexandra	H	3–0	3,040	Arquin 5', Whiteman 48', Bennett 83'	Report
26	14 January 2017	Notts County	A	0–0	11,328		Report
27	21 January 2017	Cambridge United	A	3–1	4,211	Legge 43' (og), Pearce 58', Coulthirst 73'	Report
28	28 January 2017	Leyton Orient	H	2–0	3,925	Whiteman 48', Rose 56'	Report
29	4 February 2017	Barnet	A	2–0	1,859	Whiteman 37', Coulthirst 60' (pen.)	Report
30	11 February 2017	Hartlepool United	H	4–0	4,309	Whiteman (2) 19', 76', Rose 26', MacDonald 71'	Report
31	14 February 2017	Accrington Stanley	H	4–4	3,226	Bennett 33', White 45+2', Coulthirst 63' (pen.), Arquin 89'	Report
32	18 February 2017	Grimsby Town	A	0–3	5,550		Report
33	25 February 2017	Newport County	H	2–1	3,824	Pearce 17', Coulthirst 75' (pen.)	Report
34	28 February 2017	Yeovil Town	A	0–0	2,766		Report
35	4 March 2017	Cheltenham Town	A	0–0	2,941		Report
36	11 March 2017	Plymouth Argyle	H	0–2	4,546		Report
37	14 March 2017	Colchester United	A	0–2	2,526		Report
38	18 March 2017	Carlisle United	H	2–0	4,463	Green 63', Coulthirst 76'	Report
39	25 March 2017	Morecambe	A	3–1	1,497	Rose (2) 4', 33', Whiteman 39'	Report
40	1 April 2017	Exeter City	H	1–2	3,878	Benning 38'	Report
41	8 April 2017	Doncaster Rovers	A	0–1	9,903		Report
42	14 April 2017	Wycombe Wanderers	A	1–0	4,218	Pearce 13'	Report
43	17 April 2017	Luton Town	H	1–1	4,632	Potter 23'	Report
44	22 April 2017	Stevenage	A	1–0	2,765	Rose 44'	Report
45	29 April 2017	Portsmouth	H	0–1	6,819		Report
46	6 May 2017	Crawley Town	A	2–2	2,635	Rose 12', Whiteman 23'	Report

==== League table ====
Pos	Team	Pld	W	D	L	GF	GA	GD	Pts
10	Stevenage	46	20	7	19	67	63	+4	67
11	Cambridge United	46	19	9	18	58	50	+8	66
12	Mansfield Town	46	17	15	14	54	50	+4	66
13	Accrington Stanley	46	17	14	15	59	56	+3	65
14	Grimsby Town	46	17	11	18	59	63	−4	62

Updated to match(es) played on 6 May 2017. Source: BBC Sport
Rules for classification: 1) Points; 2) Goal difference; 3) Number of goals scored

=== FA Cup ===
Round	Date	Opponent	Venue	Result	Attendance	Scorers	Report
R1	5 November 2016	Plymouth Argyle	H	1–2	2,318	Hemmings 58'	Report

=== League Cup ===
Round	Date	Opponent	Venue	Result	Attendance	Scorers	Report
R1	9 August 2016	Blackburn Rovers	H	1–3	2,885	M. Rose 48'	Report

=== EFL Trophy ===
==== Northern Group E ====
Pos	Div	Team	Pld	W	PW	PL	L	GF	GA	GD	Pts	Qualification
1	L2	Doncaster Rovers	3	1	1	1	0	4	2	+2	6	Advance to Round 2
2	L2	Mansfield Town	3	2	0	0	1	4	4	0	6	Advance to Round 2
3	L1	Port Vale	3	1	1	0	1	1	1	0	5	
4	ACA	Derby County U21	3	0	0	1	2	4	6	−2	1	

Source: Sky Sports

Round	Date	Opponent	Venue	Result	Attendance	Scorers	Report
R1	30 August 2016	Doncaster Rovers	H	0–2	1,461		Report
R1	4 October 2016	Port Vale	A	1–0	1,025	Green 66'	Report
R1	8 November 2016	Derby County U23	A	3–2	870	Hemmings 2', Henderson 5', Clements 90+3'	Report
R2	6 December 2016	Carlisle United	A	3–2	1,126	Pearce 15', Green 30', Rose 86'	Report
R3	10 January 2017	Oldham Athletic	H	2–0	1,343	Hoban (2) 84', 90+2'	Report
QF	24 January 2017	Wycombe Wanderers	H	1–2	2,047	Green 34'	Report

== Squad statistics ==
No.	Pos.	Name	League Two		FA Cup		League Cup		League Trophy		Total		Discipline	
No.	Pos.	Name	Apps	Goals	Apps	Goals	Apps	Goals	Apps	Goals	Apps	Goals	Yellow card	Red card
1	GK	(Scotland) Scott Shearer	25	0	0	0	1	0	4	0	30	0	2	0
2	DF	(England) Rhys Bennett	46	2	1	0	1	0	6	0	54	2	6	0
3	DF	(England) Mal Benning	45	1	1	0	1	0	5	0	52	1	7	1
4	DF	(England) Lee Collins	35(2)	0	1	0	1	0	4(1)	0	41(3)	0	3	0
5	DF	(England) Krystian Pearce	41	3	1	0	0	0	6	1	48	4	10	0
6	DF	(England) George Taft	9(4)	0	0	0	0	0	1	0	10(4)	0	0	0
7	MF	(England) Adam Chapman	5	0	0	0	1	0	1	0	7	0	0	0
7	MF	(England) Shaq Coulthirst	15(5)	5	0	0	0	0	0	0	15(5)	5	1	0
8	MF	(England) Chris Clements	18(2)	3	1	0	1	0	4	1	24(2)	4	4	0
8	MF	(England) Alfie Potter	5(7)	1	0	0	0	0	0	0	5(7)	1	0	0
9	FW	(Republic of Ireland) Patrick Hoban	13(8)	4	0	0	0	0	1(2)	2	14(8)	6	2	0
10	FW	(England) Matt Green	31(11)	10	1	0	0(1)	0	2(3)	3	34(15)	13	3	0
11	MF	(England) James Baxendale	3(9)	0	1	0	1	0	5	0	10(9)	0	1	0
12	GK	(Denmark) Brian Jensen	3	0	1	0	0	0	0	0	4	0	0	0
14	MF	(England) Kevan Hurst	12(2)	1	0	0	0	0	0(2)	0	12(4)	1	2	0
15	MF	(England) Kyle Howkins	13(3)	0	0	0	1	0	3	0	17(3)	0	2	1
16	DF	(England) Hayden White	18	1	0	0	0	0	0	0	18	1	1	0
17	FW	(France) Yoann Arquin	3(9)	2	0	0	0	0	2	0	5(9)	2	1	0
18	MF	(Scotland) Alex MacDonald	13(5)	1	0	0	0	0	0	0	13(5)	1	2	0
19	MF	(England) Mitch Rose	17(1)	2	1	0	1	1	0(3)	0	19(4)	3	3	0
20	MF	(England) Jack Thomas	0(6)	0	0(1)	0	0	0	2(2)	0	2(9)	0	2	0
21	GK	(England) Jake Kean	19	0	0	0	0	0	2	0	21	0	1	0
22	MF	(England) CJ Hamilton	13(16)	0	0	0	1	0	5(1)	0	19(17)	0	2	0
23	MF	(England) Ashley Hemmings	10(6)	0	1	1	1	0	4(1)	1	16(7)	2	2	0
24	MF	(England) Jamie McGuire	13(4)	0	1	0	0	0	3(1)	0	17(5)	0	2	0
25	DF	(Scotland) Alex Iacovitti	4(4)	0	0	0	0	0	0	0	4(4)	0	0	1
26	MF	(England) Joel Byrom	21(1)	0	0	0	0	0	0	0	22	0	4	0
27	MF	(England) Oscar Gobern	6(3)	0	0	0	0	0	2	0	8(3)	0	3	0
28	MF	(England) Benjamin Whiteman	23	7	0	0	0	0	0	0	23	7	2	0
32	FW	(England) Danny Rose	25(12)	9	0(1)	0	0(1)	0	1(2)	1	26(16)	10	4	1
34	FW	(England) Darius Henderson	3(10)	1	0(1)	0	0	0	2	1	5(11)	2	2	0
36	FW	(England) Jason Law	0	0	0	0	0	0	0	0	0	0	0	0
37	FW	(Antigua and Barbuda) Zayn Hakeem	0	0	0	0	0(1)	0	0	0	0(1)	0	0	0
39	FW	(England) Tom Marriott	0	0	0	0	0	0	1	0	1	0	0	0

== Transfers ==
=== Transfers in ===
Date from	Position	Nationality	Name	From	Fee	Ref.
1 July 2016	CB	(England)	Rhys Bennett	Rochdale	Free transfer	
1 July 2016	CM	(England)	CJ Hamilton	Sheffield United	Free transfer	
1 July 2016	LM	(England)	Ashley Hemmings	Dagenham & Redbridge	Free transfer	
1 July 2016	CF	(Republic of Ireland)	Patrick Hoban	Oxford United	Free transfer	
1 July 2016	RW	(England)	Kevan Hurst	Southend United	Free transfer	
1 July 2016	SS	(England)	Danny Rose	Bury	Undisclosed	
1 July 2016	CB	(England)	George Taft	Burton Albion	Free transfer	
3 August 2016	CF	(England)	Darius Henderson	Coventry City	Free transfer	
17 September 2016	CM	(England)	Oscar Gobern	Queens Park Rangers	Free transfer	
1 January 2017	CF	(Martinique)	Yoann Arquin	Syrianska	Free transfer	
1 January 2017	CM	(England)	Joel Byrom	Northampton Town	Free transfer	
31 January 2017	RW	(Scotland)	Alex MacDonald	Oxford United	Free transfer	
31 January 2017	RW	(England)	Alfie Potter	Northampton Town	Free transfer	

=== Transfers out ===
Date from	Position	Nationality	Name	To	Fee	Ref.
1 July 2016	CF	(England)	Chris Beardsley	Free agent	Released	
1 July 2016	CM	(England)	Matty Blair	Doncaster Rovers	Free transfer	
1 July 2016	CF	(Montserrat)	Anthony Dwyer	Stafford Rangers (Note: Following Anthony Dwyer being released, he later signed for Stafford Rangers.)	Released	
1 July 2016	RM	(Bermuda)	Reggie Lambe	Carlisle United	Free transfer	
1 July 2016	RB	(England)	Liam Marsden	Matlock Town (Note: Following Liam Marsden being released, he later signed for Matlock Town.)	Released	
1 July 2016	CB	(England)	Ryan Tafazolli	Peterborough United	Free transfer	
1 July 2016	CF	(England)	Craig Westcarr	Alfreton Town (Note: Following Craig Westcarr being released, he later signed for Alfreton Town.)	Released	
25 July 2016	MF	(England)	Joe Fitzpatrick	Worcester City	Free transfer	
21 October 2016	CB	(England)	Corbin Shires	Sheffield	Free transfer	
1 January 2017	CM	(England)	Oscar Gobern	Ross County (Note: Following Oscar Gobern being released, he later signed for Ross County)	Released	
1 January 2017	CF	(England)	Darius Henderson	Eastleigh (Note: Following Darius Henderson being released, he later signed for Eastleigh)	Released	
1 January 2017	CF	(Tanzania)	Adi Yussuf	Grimsby Town	Released	
19 January 2017	CM	(England)	Chris Clements	Grimsby Town	Undisclosed	
20 January 2017	RM	(England)	Mitch Rose	Newport County	Undisclosed	

=== Loans in ===
Date from	Position	Nationality	Name	From	Date until	Ref.
29 July 2016	CB	(England)	Kyle Howkins	West Bromwich Albion	3 January 2017	
31 August 2016	CB	(Scotland)	Alex Iacovitti	Nottingham Forest	End of Season	
1 January 2017	GK	(England)	Jake Kean	Sheffield Wednesday	End of Season	
1 January 2017	CM	(England)	Benjamin Whiteman	Sheffield United	End of Season	
12 January 2017	RB	(England)	Hayden White	Peterborough United	End of Season	
19 January 2017	CF	(England)	Shaq Coulthirst	Peterborough United	End of Season	

=== Loans out ===
Date from	Position	Nationality	Name	To	Date until	Ref.
2 August 2016	CF	(Tanzania)	Adi Yussuf	Crawley Town	22 January 2017	
1 September 2016	CB	(England)	Corbin Shires	Bradford Park Avenue	6 October 2016	
