= 2015–16 Mansfield Town F.C. season =

Mansfield Town
2015–16 season
- Owner: John Radford
- Chief Executive: Carolyn Radford
- Manager: Adam Murray
- Stadium: Field Mill
- League Two: 12th
- FA Cup: 1st round (knocked out by Oldham Athletic)
- League Cup: 1st round (knocked out by Sheffield Wednesday)
- League Trophy: 1st round (knocked out by Notts County)

The 2015–16 season was Mansfield Town's 119th season in their history and their third consecutive season in League Two. Along with League Two, the club will also compete in the FA Cup, League Cup and League Trophy. The season covers the period from 1 July 2015 to 30 June 2016.

== Competitions ==
=== Pre-season friendlies ===
On 7 May 2015, Mansfield Town announced three away pre-season friendlies against Rainworth Miners Welfare, Worksop Town and Basford United. On 21 May 2015, Mansfield Town announced Leicester City will visit the One Call Stadium. On 3 June 2015, Mansfield Town announced they will take a XI squad to face Barnsley on 18 July 2015 for Bobby Hassell's testimonial match. On 10 June 2015, it was announced Milton Keynes Dons will visit during pre-season. Another friendly, against Tamworth, was confirmed on 12 June 2015.

4 July 2015 Friendly	Rainworth Miners Welfare	1–5	Mansfield Town	Rainworth
15:00 BST	Chambers 33' (pen.)	Report	Dwyer 30'; Westcarr 56'; Hunt 64'; Yussuf 70', 77'	Stadium: Welfare Ground

11 July 2015 Friendly	Tamworth	1–1	Mansfield Town	Tamworth
15:00 BST	Dyer 3'	Report	Thomas 55'	Stadium: The Lamb Ground; Attendance: 546

15 July 2015 Friendly	Worksop Town	1–4	Mansfield Town	Worksop
19:45 BST	Sellars 56'	Report	Westcarr 3'; Benning 43'; Lambe 78'; Yussuf 89'	Stadium: Sandy Lane; Attendance: 637

18 July 2015 Bobby Hassell Testimonial	Barnsley	4–3	Mansfield Town	Barnsley
15:00 BST	Hassell 7' (pen.); Ball 37'; Rothlowe 66'; Nardiello 81'	Report	Green 9'; Lambe 29'; Westcarr 84'	Stadium: Oakwell

21 July 2015 Friendly	Mansfield Town	1–1	Milton Keynes Dons	Mansfield
19:45 BST	Thomas 45'	Report	Powell (?)	Stadium: Field Mill

25 July 2015 Friendly	Mansfield Town	1–1	Leicester City	Mansfield
15:00 BST	Green 27' (pen.)	Report	Nugent 10'	Stadium: Field Mill; Attendance: 4,273 (1,608 visitors)

28 July 2015 Friendly	Basford United	1–2	Mansfield Town	Basford
BST				Stadium: Greenwich Avenue

=== League Two ===
==== League table ====
Pos	Team	Pld	W	D	L	GF	GA	GD	Pts
10	Carlisle United	46	17	16	13	67	62	+5	67
11	Luton Town	46	19	9	18	63	61	+2	66
12	Mansfield Town	46	17	13	16	61	53	+8	64
13	Wycombe Wanderers	46	17	13	16	45	44	+1	64
14	Exeter City	46	17	13	16	63	65	−2	64

Updated to match(es) played on 7 May 2016. Source: BBC Sport
Rules for classification: 1) Points; 2) Goal difference; 3) Number of goals scored

==== Results summary ====
Overall								Home						Away					
Pld	W	D	L	GF	GA	GD	Pts	W	D	L	GF	GA	GD	W	D	L	GF	GA	GD
34	14	9	11	46	40	+6	51	6	6	5	25	21	+4	8	3	6	21	19	+2

Last updated: 29 February 2016.

==== Results by matchday ====
Matchday	1	2	3	4	5	6	7	8	9	10	11	12	13	14	15	16	17	18	19	20	21	22	23	24	25	26	27	28	29	30	31	32	33	34	35	36	37	38	39	40	41	42	43	44	45	46
Ground	H	A	A	H	A	H	H	A	H	A	A	H	H	A	A	H	A	H	H	A	H	A	H	H	H	A	H	A	A	H	A	A	H	A												
Result	D	W	L	D	W	D	W	L	D	W	W	W	L	W	D	L	L	W	L	W	D	D	D	L	W	L	L	W	W	W	D	L	W	L												
Position	14	7	11	12	8	8	7	11	9	7	6	4	4	4	5	6	6	6	8	7	7	8	10	11	12	8	9	9	7	5	4	7	5	9												

Updated to match(es) played on 29 February 2016. Source:
A = Away; H = Home; W = Win; D = Draw; L = Loss

==== Matches ====
On 17 June 2015, the fixtures for the forthcoming season were announced.

8 August 2015 1	Mansfield Town	1–1	Carlisle United	Mansfield
15:00 BST	Benning 29'	Report	Ibehre 45'	Stadium: Field Mill; Attendance: 4,146; Referee: Lee Swabey

14 August 2015 2	Notts County	0–2	Mansfield Town	Nottingham
19:45 BST		Report	Clements 36'; Tafazolli 80'	Stadium: Meadow Lane; Attendance: 10,074; Referee: Tim Robinson

18 August 2015 3	Accrington Stanley	1–0	Mansfield Town	Accrington
19:45 BST	McConville 33'	Report		Stadium: Crown Ground; Attendance: 1,073; Referee: Darren England

22 August 2015 4	Mansfield Town	1–1	Oxford United	Mansfield
15:00 BST	Westcarr 4'	Report	Roofe 58' (pen.)	Stadium: Field Mill; Attendance: 3,112; Referee: Ben Toner

29 August 2015 5	York City	1–2	Mansfield Town	York
15:00 BST	Thompson 6'	Report	Green 13', 30'	Stadium: Bootham Crescent; Attendance: 3,215; Referee: Tony Harrington

5 September 2015 6	Mansfield Town	1–1	AFC Wimbledon	Mansfield
15:00 BST	Clements 15'	Report	Elliott 6'	Stadium: Field Mill; Attendance: 3,042; Referee: Ross Joyce

12 September 2015 7	Mansfield Town	4–0	Crawley Town	Mansfield
15:00 BST	N. Thomas 44'; Rose 47'; Green 71'; Westcarr 72'	Report		Stadium: Field Mill; Attendance: 2,524; Referee: Andy Madley

19 September 2015 8	Luton Town	1–0	Mansfield Town	Luton
15:00 BST	Mackail-Smith 59' (pen.)	Report		Stadium: Kenilworth Road; Attendance: 7,939; Referee: Robert Lewis

26 September 2015 9	Mansfield Town	0–0	Plymouth Argyle	Mansfield
15:00 BST		Report		Stadium: Field Mill; Attendance: 3,185; Referee: Mark Brown

29 September 2015 10	Stevenage	0–2	Mansfield Town	Stevenage
19:45 BST		Report	Tafazolli 47'; J. Thomas 51'	Stadium: Broadhall Way; Attendance: 2,509; Referee: Lee Swabey

3 October 2015 11	Dagenham & Redbridge	3–4	Mansfield Town	Dagenham
15:00 BST	McClure 9'; Chambers 30', 32'	Report	Benning 6'; Green 37' (pen.); Pearce 81'; Yussuf 85'	Stadium: Victoria Road; Attendance: 1,597; Referee: Brendan Malone

10 October 2015 12	Mansfield Town	3–0	Newport County	Mansfield
15:00 BST	Westcarr 50'; Benning 70'; Yussuf 90+2'	Report		Stadium: Field Mill; Attendance: 3,278; Referee: Steve Martin

17 October 2015 13	Mansfield Town	1–2	Bristol Rovers	Mansfield
15:00 BST	Tafazolli 81'	Report	Easter 15'; Taylor 90+8'	Stadium: Field Mill; Attendance: 4,196; Referee: Mark Haywood

20 October 2015 14	Yeovil Town	0–1	Mansfield Town	Yeovil
19:45 BST		Report	Lambe 90+10'	Stadium: Huish Park; Attendance: 2,954; Referee: Charles Breakspear

24 October 2015 15	Portsmouth	0–0	Mansfield Town	Portsmouth
15:00 BST		Report		Stadium: Fratton Park; Attendance: 16,210; Referee: Kevin Wright

31 October 2015 16	Mansfield Town	0–2	Wycombe Wanderers	Mansfield
15:00 GMT		Report	O'Nien 8'; Amadi-Holloway 90+5'	Stadium: Field Mill; Attendance: 3,165; Referee: Seb Stockbridge

14 November 2015 17	Northampton Town	1–0	Mansfield Town	Northampton
15:00 GMT	Richards 4'	Report		Stadium: Sixfields Stadium; Attendance: 5,454; Referee: Darren Bond

21 November 2015 18	Mansfield Town	3–1	Hartlepool United	Mansfield
15:00 GMT	Green 24', 81'; Yussuf 57'	Report	Pearce 37' (o.g.)	Stadium: Field Mill; Attendance: 3,031; Referee: David Coote

24 November 2015 19	Mansfield Town	0–2	Exeter City	Mansfield
19:45 GMT		Report	Grant 6'; Holmes 41'	Stadium: Field Mill; Attendance: 2,435; Referee: Oliver Langford

28 November 2015 20	Barnet	1–3	Mansfield Town	Canons Park
15:00 GMT	Akinde 77' (pen.)	Report	Lambe 31'; Green 60'; Nelson 88' (o.g.)	Stadium: The Hive Stadium; Attendance: 1,775; Referee: Trevor Kettle

12 December 2015 21	Mansfield Town	1–1	Leyton Orient	Mansfield
15:00 GMT	Lambe 40'	Report	Simpson 12'	Stadium: Field Mill; Attendance: 2,935; Referee: Darren England

19 December 2015 22	Cambridge United	1–1	Mansfield Town	Cambridge
15:00 GMT	Donaldson 36'	Report	Chapman 23'	Stadium: Abbey Stadium; Attendance: 4,589; Referee: Ross Joyce

28 December 2015 23	Mansfield Town	1–1	York City	Mansfield
15:00 GMT	Pearce 31'	Report	Winfield 10'	Stadium: Field Mill; Attendance: 3,958; Referee: Darren Handley

2 January 2016 24	Mansfield Town	2–3	Accrington Stanley	Mansfield
15:00 GMT	Green 27'; Clements 88'	Report	Mingoia 4'; Kee 72'; Gornell 85'	Stadium: Field Mill; Attendance: 3,271; Referee: Scott Duncan

9 January 2016 25	Mansfield Town	2–1	Stevenage	Mansfield
15:00 GMT	Clements 42'; Baxendale 65'	Report	Gnanduillet 90+5'	Stadium: Field Mill; Attendance: 3,126; Referee: David Webb

16 January 2016 26	AFC Wimbledon	3–1	Mansfield Town	Kingston upon Thames
15:00 GMT	Taylor 49'; Meades 78'; Azeez 87'	Report	Green 11'	Stadium: Kingsmeadow; Attendance: 4,089; Referee: Fred Graham

23 January 2016 27	Mansfield Town	0–2	Luton Town	Mansfield
15:00 GMT		Report	McCourt 7'; Ruddock Mpanzu 54'	Stadium: Field Mill; Attendance: 4,245; Referee: Ben Toner

26 January 2016 28	Morecambe	1–2	Mansfield Town	Morecambe
15:00 GMT	Mullin 71' (pen.)	Report	Clements 86'; Yussuf 90'	Stadium: Globe Arena; Attendance: 1,047; Referee: Nigel Miller

30 January 2016 29	Crawley Town	0–1	Mansfield Town	Crawley
15:00 GMT		Report	Beardsley 60'	Stadium: Broadfield Stadium; Attendance: 1,981; Referee: Graham Horwood

6 February 2016 30	Mansfield Town	2–1	Morecambe	Mansfield
15:00 GMT	Blair 15'; Pearce 24'	Report	Ellison 1'	Stadium: Field Mill; Attendance: 3,090; Referee: Mark Heywood

9 February 2016 31	Oxford United	2–2	Mansfield Town	Oxford
19:45 GMT	Hylton 30', 69'	Report	Green 22'; J. Thomas 89'	Stadium: Kassam Stadium; Attendance: 5,346; Referee: James Linington

13 February 2016 32	Plymouth Argyle	3–0	Mansfield Town	Plymouth
15:00 GMT	Wylde 33'; Brunt 36' (pen.), 84'	Report		Stadium: Home Park; Attendance: 7,494; Referee: Brendan Malone

20 February 2016 33	Mansfield Town	3–2	Dagenham & Redbridge	Mansfield
15:00 GMT	Blair 53'; Yussuf 67'; Green 84'	Report	Hawkins 42'; Cureton 86'	Stadium: Field Mill; Attendance: 2,822; Referee: Seb Stockbridge

27 February 2016 34	Newport County	1–0	Mansfield Town	Newport
15:00 GMT	Boden 86'	Report		Stadium: Rodney Parade; Attendance: 2,361; Referee: Gavin Ward

5 March 2016 35	Mansfield Town	0–1	Yeovil Town	Mansfield
15:00 GMT	Collins (yellow card) 57'	Report	Dawson (yellow card) 67'; Dickson 90'	Stadium: Field Mill; Attendance: 2,713; Referee: Darren England

12 March 2016 36	Bristol Rovers	1–0	Mansfield Town	Bristol
15:00 GMT	Taylor 61'; Mansell (yellow card) 77'; Brown (yellow card) 90+2'; Harrison (yellow card) 90+3'; McBurnie (yellow card) 90+3'	Report	Lambe (yellow card) 40'; Tafazolli (yellow card) 59'; Benning (yellow card) 66'; Shearer (yellow card) 90+3'	Stadium: Memorial Stadium; Attendance: 7,847; Referee: Dean Whitestone

19 March 2016 37	Mansfield Town	1–1	Portsmouth	Mansfield
15:00 GMT	Green 26', (yellow card) 31'; Dieseruvwe (yellow card) 28'; Rose (yellow card) 30'	Report	Tafazolli 43' (o.g.); Stevens (yellow card) 66'	Stadium: Field Mill; Attendance: 3,980; Referee: Carl Boyeson

25 March 2016 38	Wycombe Wanderers	1–0	Mansfield Town	High Wycombe
15:00 GMT	Harriman 68', (yellow card) 69'	Report		Stadium: Adams Park; Attendance: 5,003; Referee: Iain Williamson

28 March 2016 39	Mansfield Town	2–2	Northampton Town	Mansfield
15:00 BST	Green 12', 16'; Tafazolli (yellow card) 20'; McGuire (yellow card) 24' (yellow-red card) 45+5'; Thomas (yellow card) 51'	Report	Buchanan (yellow card) 42'; Holmes 64' (pen.); Marquis 68'; Hoskins (yellow card) 85'; Maloney (yellow card) 90+4'	Stadium: Field Mill; Attendance: 4,367; Referee: Darren Handley

2 April 2016 40	Hartlepool United	2–1	Mansfield Town	Hartlepool
15:00 BST	Paynter 24' (pen.), 85' (pen.); Thomas (yellow card) 25'; Bates (yellow card) 73'; Carroll (yellow card) 88'	Report	Pearce (red card) 24'; Collins (yellow card) 25'; Blair (yellow card) 54'; Daniel 76'; Tafazolli (yellow card) 85'; Benning (yellow card) 90+4'	Stadium: Victoria Park; Attendance: 3,893; Referee: Graham Salisbury

9 April 2016 41	Carlisle United	1–2	Mansfield Town	Carlisle
15:00 BST	Miller (yellow card) 40', (goal) 90+4'; Comley (yellow card) 79'	Report	Daniel 21'; Lambe 62'	Stadium: Brunton Park; Attendance: 4,426; Referee: David Webb

16 April 2016 42	Mansfield Town	5–0	Notts County	Mansfield
15:00 BST	Green 6', 60'; Chapman 57'; Lambe 67'; Rose 83'	Report	Aborah (yellow card) 25'; Stead (yellow card) 48'	Stadium: Field Mill; Attendance: 6,357; Referee: Geoff Eltringham

19 April 2016 43	Exeter City	2–3	Mansfield Town	Exeter
19:45 BST	Watkins 64'; Ribeiro 79'; Taylor (yellow card) 90+1'	Report	Tafazolli 11', 82'; Benning 56'; Green (yellow card) 74'	Stadium: St James Park; Attendance: 3,407; Referee: Charles Breakspear

23 April 2016 44	Mansfield Town	1–1	Barnet	Mansfield
15:00 BST	Dieseruvwe 30'	Report	Akinde 6'	Stadium: Field Mill; Attendance: 2,573; Referee: Andy Haines

30 April 2016 45	Leyton Orient	1–0	Mansfield Town	London
15:00 BST	Palmer 48'; James (yellow card) 78'	Report	Baxendale (yellow card) 90+5'	Stadium: Brisbane Road; Attendance: 4,257; Referee: Gavin Ward

7 May 2016 46	Mansfield Town	0–0	Cambridge United	Mansfield
15:00 BST		Report		Stadium: Field Mill; Attendance: 3,548

=== FA Cup ===
On 26 October 2015, the first round draw was made.

7 November 2015 First round	Mansfield Town	0–0	Oldham Athletic	Mansfield
15:00 GMT		Report		Stadium: Field Mill; Attendance: 2,886; Referee: Tony Harrington

17 November 2015 replay	Oldham Athletic	2–0	Mansfield Town	Oldham
19:45 GMT	Philliskirk 70'; Poleon 78'	Report		Stadium: Boundary Park; Attendance: 1,893; Referee: Lee Collins

=== League Cup ===
On 16 June 2015, the first round draw was made, Mansfield Town were drawn away against Sheffield Wednesday.

11 August 2015 First round	Sheffield Wednesday	4–1	Mansfield Town	Owlerton
19:45 BST	João 13'; Semedo 19'; Lee 53'; Sougou 84'	Report	Tafazolli 45'	Stadium: Hillsborough; Attendance: 14,021; Referee: Mark Brown

=== Football League Trophy ===
On 8 August 2015, live on Soccer AM the draw for the first round of the Football League Trophy was drawn by Toni Duggan and Alex Scott. Stags travelled to Notts County.

1 September 2015 First round	Notts County	3–1	Mansfield Town	Nottingham
19:45 BST	McLeod 52'; Edwards 79'; Stead 90'	Report	Westcarr 90' (pen.)	Stadium: Meadow Lane; Attendance: 2,696; Referee: Richard Clark

== Team details ==
=== Appearances and goals ===
As of 29 February 2016

No.	Pos	Nat	Player	Total		League Two		FA Cup		League Cup		League Trophy	
No.	Pos	Nat	Player	Apps	Goals	Apps	Goals	Apps	Goals	Apps	Goals	Apps	Goals
1	GK	(Scotland) SCO	Scott Shearer	11	0	9	0	1	0	1	0	0	0
2	DF	(England) ENG	Liam Marsden	1	0	0	0	0	0	0	0	1	0
3	DF	(England) ENG	Mal Benning	21	3	19	3	0	0	1	0	1	0
4	MF	(England) ENG	Mitch Rose	28	1	20+5	1	1+1	0	0	0	1	0
5	DF	(England) ENG	Krystian Pearce	33	3	29+1	3	2	0	0	0	1	0
6	DF	(England) ENG	Lee Collins	26	0	17+6	0	2	0	0	0	1	0
7	MF	(England) ENG	Adam Chapman	32	1	28	1	2	0	1	0	1	0
8	MF	(England) ENG	Chris Clements	33	5	25+5	5	1	0	1	0	0+1	0
9	FW	(England) ENG	Chris Beardsley	14	1	6+6	1	0	0	1	0	1	0
10	FW	(England) ENG	Matt Green	34	11	32	11	2	0	0	0	0	0
11	FW	(England) ENG	Craig Westcarr	27	4	21+3	3	1	0	1	0	0+1	1
12	GK	(Denmark) DEN	Brian Jensen	27	0	25	0	1	0	0	0	1	0
14	MF	(England) ENG	Colin Daniel (on loan from Port Vale)	1	0	1	0	0	0	0	0	0	0
15	DF	(England) ENG	Ryan Tafazolli	35	4	32	3	2	0	1	1	0	0
17	MF	(England) ENG	Matty Blair	23	2	10+11	2	1+1	0	0	0	0	0
18	FW	(Tanzania) TAN	Adi Yussuf	26	5	0+22	5	0+2	0	0+1	0	1	0
19	MF	(Bermuda) BER	Reggie Lambe	32	3	24+6	3	1	0	0+1	0	0	0
20	MF	(England) ENG	Jack Thomas	26	2	9+14	2	1	0	1	0	0+1	0
23	MF	(Republic of Ireland) IRL	Sean Kavanagh (on loan from Fulham)	4	0	1+3	0	0	0	0	0	0	0
24	MF	(England) ENG	Jamie McGuire	19	0	14+3	0	1	0	0	0	1	0
27	DF	(Wales) WAL	Daniel Alfei (on loan from Swansea City)	4	0	2+2	0	0	0	0	0	0	0
30	MF	(England) ENG	Joe Fitzpatrick	0	0	0	0	0	0	0	0	0	0
31	MF	(England) ENG	James Baxendale	9	1	9	1	0	0	0	0	0	0
35	DF	(England) ENG	Corbin Shires	1	0	0	0	0	0	1	0	0	0
Left During Season
14	MF	(England) ENG	Nathan Thomas	21	1	9+8	1	1+1	0	1	0	1	0
16	DF	(England) ENG	Nicky Hunt	21	0	19	0	1	0	1	0	0	0
26	MF	(England) ENG	James Caton (loan returns to Shrewsbury Town)	1	0	0	0	0	0	0+1	0	0	0
28	DF	(England) ENG	Blair Adams (loan returns to Notts County)	15	0	13	0	2	0	0	0	0	0

=== Goalscorers ===
Rank	Pos	No.	Nat	Name	League Two	FA Cup	League Cup	League Trophy	Total
1	FW	10	(England)	Matt Green	11	–	–	–	11
2	MF	8	(England)	Chris Clements	5	–	–	–	5
2	FW	18	(Tanzania)	Adi Yussuf	5	–	–	–	5
4	FW	11	(England)	Craig Westcarr	3	–	–	1	4
4	DF	15	(England)	Ryan Tafazolli	3	–	1	–	4
6	DF	3	(England)	Mal Benning	3	–	–	–	3
6	DF	5	(England)	Krystian Pearce	3	–	–	–	3
6	MF	19	(Bermuda)	Reggie Lambe	3	–	–	–	3
9	MF	20	(England)	Jack Thomas	2	–	–	–	2
9	MF	17	(England)	Matty Blair	2	–	–	–	2
11	MF	4	(England)	Mitch Rose	1	–	–	–	1
11	MF	7	(England)	Adam Chapman	1	–	–	–	1
11	FW	9	(England)	Chris Beardsley	1	–	–	–	1
11	MF	14	(England)	Nathan Thomas	1	–	–	–	1
11	MF	31	(England)	James Baxendale	1	–	–	–	1
11	Own Goal(s)				1	–	–	–	1
TOTAL					46	–	1	1	48

=== Disciplinary record ===
As of 29 February 2016

No.	Po.	Name	League Two		FA Cup		League Cup		League Trophy		Total	
No.	Po.	Name	Yellow card	Red card	Yellow card	Red card	Yellow card	Red card	Yellow card	Red card	Yellow card	Red card
1	GK	Scott Shearer	1	0	0	0	0	0	0	0	1	0
3	DF	Mal Benning	5	0	0	0	0	0	0	0	5	0
4	MF	Mitch Rose	6	0	0	0	0	0	0	0	6	0
5	DF	Krystian Pearce	4	2	0	0	0	0	0	0	4	2
6	DF	Lee Collins	1	0	0	0	0	0	1	0	2	0
7	MF	Adam Chapman	2	0	0	0	1	0	0	0	3	0
8	MF	Chris Clements	11	1	0	0	0	0	0	0	11	1
9	FW	Chris Beardsley	1	0	0	0	0	0	0	0	1	0
10	FW	Matt Green	8	1	0	0	0	0	0	0	8	1
11	FW	Craig Westcarr	1	0	0	0	0	0	0	0	1	0
12	GK	Brian Jensen	2	0	0	0	0	0	0	0	2	0
14	MF	Nathan Thomas	2	0	0	0	0	0	0	0	2	0
15	DF	Ryan Tafazolli	5	0	1	0	0	0	0	0	6	0
16	MF	Nicky Hunt	7	1	0	0	0	0	0	0	7	1
17	MF	Matty Blair	1	0	0	0	0	0	0	0	1	0
18	FW	Adi Yussuf	2	0	0	0	0	0	1	0	3	0
19	MF	Reggie Lambe	2	0	1	0	0	0	0	0	3	0
20	MF	Jack Thomas	4	0	0	0	0	0	0	0	4	0
24	MF	Jamie McGuire	3	0	1	0	0	0	0	0	4	0
27	DF	Daniel Alfei	1	0	0	0	0	0	0	0	1	0
28	DF	Blair Adams	1	0	0	0	0	0	0	0	1	0
Total			70	5	3	0	1	0	2	0	76	5

== Transfers ==
=== Transfers in ===
Date from	Position	Nationality	Name	From	Fee	Ref.
1 July 2015	CF	ENG	Chris Beardsley	Stevenage	Free transfer	
1 July 2015	LB	ENG	Mal Benning	Walsall	Free transfer	
1 July 2015	CM	NIR	Adam Chapman	Newport County	Free transfer	
1 July 2015	CB	ENG	Lee Collins	Northampton Town	Free transfer	
1 July 2015	CF	ENG	Anthony Dwyer	Academy	Trainee	
1 July 2015	CF	ENG	Matt Green	Birmingham City	Free transfer	
1 July 2015	RB	ENG	Nicky Hunt	Accrington Stanley	Free transfer	
1 July 2015	GK	DEN	Brian Jensen	Crawley Town	Free transfer	
1 July 2015	MF	ENG	Mitch Rose	Rotherham United	Free transfer	
1 July 2015	GK	SCO	Scott Shearer	Crewe Alexandra	Free transfer	
1 July 2015	RW	ENG	Nathan Thomas	Motherwell	Free transfer	
1 July 2015	CF	ENG	Craig Westcarr	Portsmouth	Free transfer	
1 July 2015	CF	TAN	Adi Yussuf	Oxford City	Free transfer	
2 July 2015	LM	ENG	Conor Green	Academy	Trainee	
2 July 2015	CM	ENG	Chris Spencer	Academy	Trainee	
10 July 2015	CB	ENG	Krystian Pearce	Torquay United	Free transfer	

=== Transfers out ===
Date from	Position	Nationality	Name	To	Fee	Ref.
1 July 2015	RB	WAL	Lee Beevers	Lincoln City (Note: Following Beevers' release he joined Lincoln City.)	Free transfer	
1 July 2015	CF	ENG	Rakish Bingham	Hartlepool United (Note: Following Bingham's release he joined Hartlepool United.)	Free transfer	
1 July 2015	LM	ENG	Junior Brown	Shrewsbury Town	Free transfer	
1 July 2015	CB	SCO	John Dempster	Retired	—N/a	
1 July 2015	CF	ENG	Alex Fisher	Torquay United (Note: Following Fisher's release he joined Torquay United.)	Released	
1 July 2015	CF	ENG	Liam Hearn	Lincoln City	Free transfer	
1 July 2015	CM	ENG	Simon Heslop	Torquay United (Note: Following Heslop's release he joined Torquay United.)	Free transfer	
1 July 2015	CM	ENG	Ricky Ravenhill	Free Agent	Released	
1 July 2015	CB	ENG	Michael Raynes	Carlisle United (Note: Following Raynes' release he joined Carlisle United.)	Free transfer	
1 July 2015	CF	ENG	Matt Rhead	Lincoln City	Free transfer	
1 July 2015	CB	ENG	Martin Riley	Tranmere Rovers (Note: Following Riley's release he joined Tranmere Rovers.)	Free transfer	
1 July 2015	GK	SUI	Sascha Studer	Free Agent	Released	
1 July 2015	CB	ENG	Ritchie Sutton	Tranmere Rovers (Note: Following Sutton's release he joined Tranmere Rovers.)	Free transfer	
6 July 2015	CF	ENG	Ollie Palmer	Leyton Orient	Undisclosed	
12 January 2016	MF	ENG	Nathan Thomas	Hartlepool United	Undisclosed	

=== Loans in ===
Date from	Position	Nationality	Name	From	Date until	Ref.
8 August 2015	LW	ENG	James Caton	Shrewsbury Town	5 September 2015	
20 October 2015	DF	ENG	Blair Adams	Notts County	19 January 2016	
9 January 2016	MF	ENG	James Baxendale	Walsall	9 February 2016	

=== Loans out ===
Date from	Position	Nationality	Name	To	Date until	Ref.
6 August 2015	CF	ENG	Dan Fletcher	Carlton Town	1 October 2015	
6 August 2015	DF	ENG	Conor Green	Carlton Town	1 October 2015	
6 August 2015	CM	ENG	Chris Spencer	Hednesford Town	3 September 2015	
22 August 2015	CM	ENG	Joe Fitzpatrick	Sutton Coldfield Town	18 September 2015	(Note: On 18 September 2015, Mansfield Town recalled Fitzpatrick from his loan spell at Sutton Coldfield Town due to a virus in the camp.)
8 September 2015	CM	ENG	Chris Spencer	Mickleover Sports	10 December 2015	
11 September 2015	CF	ENG	Anthony Dwyer	Mickleover Sports	10 December 2015	
23 October 2015	CF	ENG	Liam Marsden	Guiseley	23 November 2015	
