= Tom Marriott =

English footballer

Personal information
- Date of birth: 13 December 1998 (age 27)
- Place of birth: Chesterfield, England
- Position: Midfielder

Youth career
- Derby County
- –2016: Mansfield Town

College career
Years	Team	Apps	(Gls)
2019–2021	Lander Bearcats	41	(23)

Senior career*
Years	Team	Apps	(Gls)
2016–2017	Mansfield Town	0	(0)
2021	Charlotte Eagles	13	(8)
2022–	North Carolina Fusion U23	0	(0)
- * Club domestic league appearances and goals as of 15:21, 24 March 2022 (UTC)

Tom Marriott (born 13 December 1998) is an English footballer who plays as a midfielder for North Carolina Fusion U23.

== Playing career ==
Marriott made his debut for Mansfield Town in a 1–0 win over Port Vale on 4 October 2016, in an EFL Trophy group stage game at Vale Park. He was released at the end of the season having failed to make any further appearances.

In 2019, he enrolled at Lander University playing college soccer. He played for USL League Two side Charlotte Eagles during the 2021 season. In March 2022, he appeared and scored for North Carolina Fusion U23 in a U.S. Open Cup match.

== Style of play ==
In 2015, the Mansfield Town website described Marriott as a right-sided attacking midfielder who was "a creative player with an eye for goal".

== Statistics ==
Appearances and goals by club, season and competition
Club	Season	League			FA Cup		EFL Cup		Other		Total	
Club	Season	Division	Apps	Goals	Apps	Goals	Apps	Goals	Apps	Goals	Apps	Goals
Mansfield Town	2016–17	League Two	0	0	0	0	0	0	1 (Note: Appearance/s in the EFL Trophy.)	0	1	0
Career total			0	0	0	0	0	0	1	0	1	0
