= Chris Clements (footballer) =

English footballer (born 1990)

Personal information
- Full name: Christopher Lee Clements
- Date of birth: 6 February 1990 (age 36)
- Place of birth: Birmingham, England
- Height: 5 ft 9 in (1.75 m)
- Position: Attacking midfielder

Team information
- Current team: Rugby Borough

Youth career
- 2004–2007: Crewe Alexandra

Senior career*
Years	Team	Apps	(Gls)
2007–2010	Crewe Alexandra	0	(0)
2008	→ Nantwich Town (loan)	?	(?)
2008–2009	→ Leigh Genesis (loan)	?	(?)
2009	→ Stafford Rangers (loan)	?	(2)
2009	→ ÍBV (loan)	15	(1)
2010	→ Hednesford Town (loan)	7	(0)
2010–2012	Hednesford Town	104	(28)
2012–2017	Mansfield Town	132	(10)
2017–2018	Grimsby Town	16	(4)
2017	→ Barrow (loan)	7	(0)
2018	→ Forest Green Rovers (loan)	14	(1)
2018–2021	Cheltenham Town	69	(3)
2021–2022	Nuneaton Borough		
2022–2023	Hednesford Town	1	(0)
2023	Stafford Rangers	3	(0)
2023	Alvechurch		
2023	Sutton Coldfield Town		
2023–2025	Rugby Town	51	(0)
2025	Racing Club Warwick		
2025–2026	Wellingborough Town		
2026–	Rugby Borough		
- * Club domestic league appearances and goals as of 12:00, 12 April 2024 (UTC)

Christopher Lee Clements (born 6 February 1990) is an English footballer who plays as a midfielder for Northern Premier League Division One Midlands club Rugby Borough.

He has played in the Football League with Crewe Alexandra, Mansfield Town, Grimsby Town, Forest Green Rovers and Cheltenham Town, in Iceland with ÍBV and in Non-league football for Barrow, Nantwich Town, Leigh Genesis, Stafford Rangers, Hednesford Town and Stafford Rangers.

== Career ==
=== Crewe Alexandra ===
Clements began his career with Crewe Alexandra as a member of the club's renowned academy. His career debut came in a loan spell at Nantwich Town in 2008. Following this loan, Clements was sent out on loan to Leigh Genesis during the 2008–09 season, and also to Stafford Rangers, before signing his first professional contract with Crewe. Having signed his first contract, in 2009 Clements was loaned out once more, this time alongside A-Jay Leitch-Smith, to Icelandic club ÍBV, before returning to England early due to an injury crisis at his parent club.

Clements made his debut for Crewe on 7 November 2009, in a 3–2 FA Cup first round defeat away at Conference National side York City; starting on the substitutes' bench, he replaced James Bailey in the 90th minute. This proved to be Clements' only appearance for Crewe; at the end of the 2009–10 season, when his contract expired, he was released by the club.

=== Hednesford Town ===
In the summer of 2010, Clements joined Hednesford Town; he had a two-season stint at the club. He picked up the young player of the year award at the end of the 2011–12 season at the Northern Premier League's annual event.

=== Mansfield Town ===
Clements played as a trialist for Burnley's reserve side in a 3–1 win over Tranmere Rovers on 30 April 2012. In spite of the trial being unsuccessful, Clements was signed by Mansfield Town at the beginning of June 2012. After helping the Stags to the 2012–13 Conference National title, Clements was awarded a new contract at the club for 2013–14.

=== Grimsby Town ===
On 18 January 2017, Clements signed an 18-month contract with newly promoted League Two side Grimsby Town. He scored the opening goal on his debut for the club on 4 February 2017, a 56th-minute header, in a 1–1 draw against Luton Town. Clements didn't feature in a first team game for Grimsby during the 2017–18 campaign, mainly for personal reasons and the need to gain match fitness.

He joined National League side Barrow on 29 September 2017 on a three-month loan deal. He debuted one day later in their 1–0 home defeat against Maidstone, and made seven appearances for Barrow before the loan expired on 25 November 2017. Clements joined newly promoted League Two side Forest Green Rovers on 31 January 2018, transfer deadline day, until the end of season. He debuted three days later, coming on in the 63rd minute as a substitute, in their 2–1 home victory against Coventry City. On 24 May 2018 Clements was released by Grimsby.

=== Cheltenham Town ===
In August 2018, Clements joined Cheltenham Town on a short-term deal. In May 2019 he signed a new one-year contract to remain at Cheltenham for the 2019-20 season. He helped Cheltenham reach the 2019-20 League Two play-offs, only for the team to bow out losing 3-2 on aggregate to Northampton Town over two legs.

In August 2020, he signed a new one-year contract to stay at Cheltenham for the 2020-21 season.

=== Non-League football ===
On 18 September 2021, Clements signed for Southern League Premier Division Central side Nuneaton Borough. On 22 September 2022, Clements departed Nuneaton Borough to return to league rivals Hednesford Town, ten years after departing the club previously.

Clements returned to Stafford Rangers during the 2022–23 season.

In June 2023, Clements signed for Alvechurch.

In June 2025, Clements joined Northern Premier League Division One Midlands club Racing Club Warwick.

== Career statistics ==
As of match played 28 April 2018

Appearances and goals by club, season and competition
Club	Season	League			National Cup		League Cup		Other		Total	
Club	Season	Division	Apps	Goals	Apps	Goals	Apps	Goals	Apps	Goals	Apps	Goals
Crewe Alexandra	2007–08	League One	0	0	0	0	0	0	0	0	0	0
Crewe Alexandra	2008–09	League One	0	0	0	0	0	0	0	0	0	0
Crewe Alexandra	2009–10	League Two	0	0	1	0	0	0	0	0	1	0
Crewe Alexandra	Total		0	0	1	0	0	0	0	0	1	0
ÍBV (loan)	2009	Úrvalsdeild	15	1	0	0	0	0	0	0	15	1
Hednesford Town	2009–10	Southern League Premier Division	7	0	0	0	~	~	0	0	7	0
Hednesford Town	2010–11	Southern League Premier Division	36	7	1	0	~	~	0	0	37	7
Hednesford Town	2011–12	NPL Premier Division	43	9	3	3	~	~	0	0	46	12
Hednesford Town	Total		86	16	4	3	~	~	0	0	90	19
Mansfield Town	2012–13	Conference Premier	17	0	5	0	~	~	1 (Note: Appearance in the FA Trophy)	0	23	0
Mansfield Town	2013–14	League Two	23	1	1	0	0	0	0	0	24	1
Mansfield Town	2014–15	League Two	34	1	4	0	1	0	1 (Note: Appearances in the Football League Trophy)	0	40	1
Mansfield Town	2015–16	League Two	38	5	1	0	1	0	1	0	41	5
Mansfield Town	2016–17	League Two	20	3	1	0	1	0	4 (Note: Appearances in the EFL Trophy)	1	26	4
Mansfield Town	Total		132	10	12	0	3	0	7	1	154	11
Grimsby Town	2016–17	League Two	16	4	0	0	0	0	0	0	16	4
Grimsby Town	2017–18	League Two	0	0	0	0	0	0	0	0	0	0
Grimsby Town	Total		16	4	0	0	0	0	0	0	16	4
Barrow (loan)	2017–18	National League	7	0	1	0	~	~	0	0	8	0
Forest Green Rovers (loan)	2017–18	League Two	14	1	0	0	0	0	0	0	14	1
Career total			270	32	18	3	3	0	7	1	298	36

== Honours ==
Hednesford Town

- Southern League Cup: 2010–11

Mansfield Town

- Conference Premier: 2012–13

Cheltenham Town

- EFL League Two: 2020–21

Individual

- Northern Premier League Young Player of the Year award: 2011–12
