= Jack Thomas (footballer, born 1996) =

English association football player

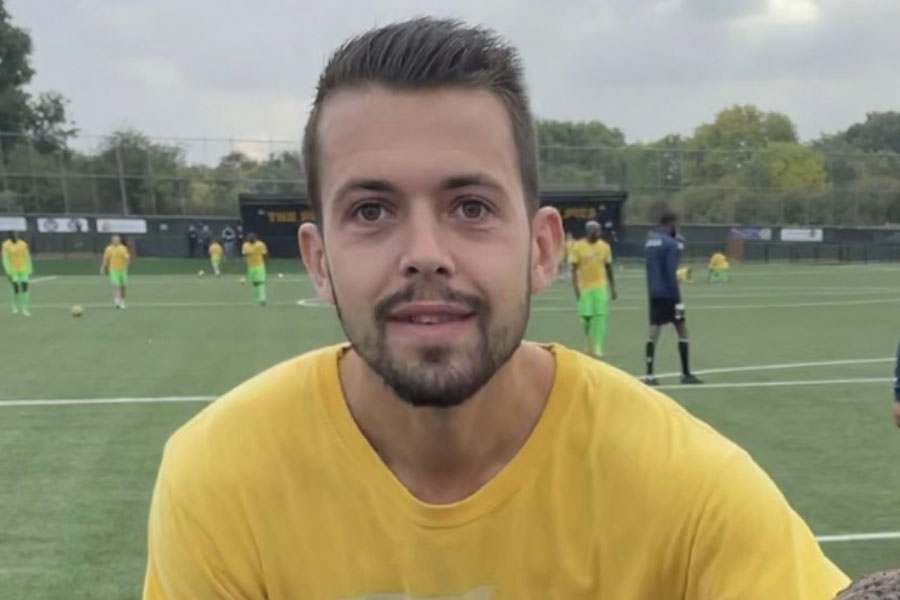
- Thomas in October 2021

Personal information
- Full name: Jack Thomas
- Date of birth: 3 June 1996 (age 30)
- Place of birth: Mansfield Woodhouse, England
- Height: 1.74 m (5 ft 8 1/2 in)
- Position: Midfielder

Team information
- Current team: Stamford

Youth career
- Woodhouse Colts
- Notts County
- Mansfield Town

Senior career*
Years	Team	Apps	(Gls)
2014–2018	Mansfield Town	53	(3)
2014–2015	→ Hednesford Town (loan)	9	(1)
2017	→ Barrow (loan)	5	(0)
2017	→ Boston United (loan)	3	(0)
2018	→ Tamworth (loan)	3	(0)
2018–2020	Basford United	65	(9)
2020–2021	Ilkeston Town	7	(0)
2021–2022	Tamworth	24	(2)
2022–2023	Ilkeston Town	43	(3)
2023–2024	Basford United	38	(4)
2024	Anstey Nomads	?	(?)
2024–2025	Rushall Olympic	28	(0)
2025–	Stamford	0	(0)
- * Club domestic league appearances and goals as of 12:57, 31 May 2024 (UTC)

Jack Thomas (born 3 June 1996) is an English footballer who plays for Basford, as a midfielder.

== Playing career ==
=== Mansfield Town ===
In September 2017 he joined Boston United on an initial month's loan.

On 13 February 2018, Thomas joined Tamworth on an initial one-month loan deal.

He was released by Mansfield at the end of the 2017–18 season.

=== Basford United ===
In August 2018, it was announced that he had signed a one-year contract for Northern Premier League Premier Division side Basford United.

=== Ilkeston Town ===
On 4 September 2020, Thomas signed for Northern Premier League Division One South East side Ilkeston Town, with manager Martin Carruthers describing the signing as a real coup for the club.

=== Tamworth return ===
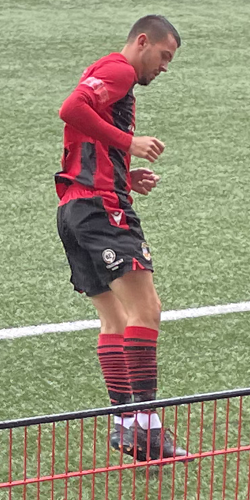
Thomas playing for Tamworth in August 2021.

Thomas re-signed for Southern League Premier Division Central side Tamworth on 31 May 2021. Thomas made his second debut for Tamworth on the 14 August 2021, the opening day of the Southern League Premier Division Central season away at Royston Town, with his new club succumbing to a disappointing 3–0 defeat.

Thomas became a mainstay in the Tamworth line up, and scored his first goal on 9 November 2021 in an away Southern League Premier Division Central fixture against Bromsgrove Sporting, Thomas scored on the 16th minute to give Tamworth the lead with a long range effort that beat Bromsgrove Sporting goalkeeper Ákos Onódi. The game however finished 1-1.

On the 26 February 2022, Jack scored his second goal for Tamworth in a 6-0 demolition of Barwell in a home Southern League Premier Division Central fixture. Thomas scored the third goal of the match.

In total Thomas made 37 appearances for Tamworth, and scored two goals.

=== Ilkeston Town return ===
Thomas resigned for Northern Premier League Division One Midlands side Ilkeston Town on 18 March 2022, the departure came as a shock to Tamworth, but manager Andy Peaks revealed that the move worked better geographically for Thomas.

=== Basford United return ===
In May 2023, Thomas rejoined his former club Basford United.

=== Anstey Nomads ===
On 30 May 2024, Thomas joined Northern Premier League Division One Midlands side Anstey Nomads.

== Career statistics ==
As of end of 2023–24 season

Appearances and goals by club, season and competition
Club	Season	League			FA Cup		League Cup		Other		Total	
Club	Season	Division	Apps	Goals	Apps	Goals	Apps	Goals	Apps	Goals	Apps	Goals
Mansfield Town	2013–14	League Two	1	0	0	0	0	0	0	0	1	0
Mansfield Town	2014–15	League Two	12	1	0	0	0	0	0	0	12	1
Mansfield Town	2015–16	League Two	33	2	1	0	1	0	1 (Note: Appearances in Football League Trophy)	0	36	2
Mansfield Town	2016–17	League Two	6	0	1	0	0	0	4	0	11	0
Mansfield Town	2017–18	League Two	1	0	0	0	0	0	4	0	5	0
Mansfield Town	Total		53	3	2	0	1	0	9	0	65	3
Hednesford Town (loan)	2014–15	Conference North	9	1	0	0	—		0	0	9	1
Barrow (loan)	2016–17	National League	5	0	0	0	—		1 (Note: Appearances in FA Trophy)	0	6	0
Boston United (loan)	2017–18	National League North	3	0	5	0	—		0	0	8	0
Tamworth (loan)	2017–18	National League North	3	0	0	0	—		0	0	3	0
Basford United	2018–19	Northern Premier League Premier Division	36	6	1	0	—		10 (Note: Four appearances one goal in FA Trophy, three appearances in Northern Premier League Challenge Cup, three appearances in Nottinghamshire Senior Cup)	1	47	7
Basford United	2019–20	Northern Premier League Premier Division	29	3	1	0	—		4 (Note: Two appearances in FA Trophy, two appearances in Northern Premier League Challenge Cup)	0	34	3
Basford United	Total		65	9	2	0	—		14	1	81	10
Ilkeston Town	2020–21	Northern Premier League Division One South East	7	0	5	1	—		1	0	13	1
Tamworth	2021–22	Southern League Premier Division Central	24	2	5	0	—		4 (Note: One appearance in Southern League Cup, two appearances in FA Trophy, one appearance in Birmingham Senior Cup)	0	33	2
Ilkeston Town	2021–22	Northern Premier League Division One Midlands	7	2	0	0	—		0	0	7	2
Ilkeston Town	2022–23	Southern League Premier Division Central	36	1	2	0	—		2 (Note: One appearance in FA Trophy, one appearance in Derbyshire Senior Cup)	0	40	1
Ilkeston Town	Total		43	3	2	0	—		2	0	47	3
Basford United	2023–24	Northern Premier League Premier Division	38	4	1	0	—		2 (Note: Appearance(s) in Nottinghamshire Senior Cup)	0	41	4
Career total			250	22	22	1	1	0	33	1	306	24
