= Adi Yussuf =

Tanzanian footballer

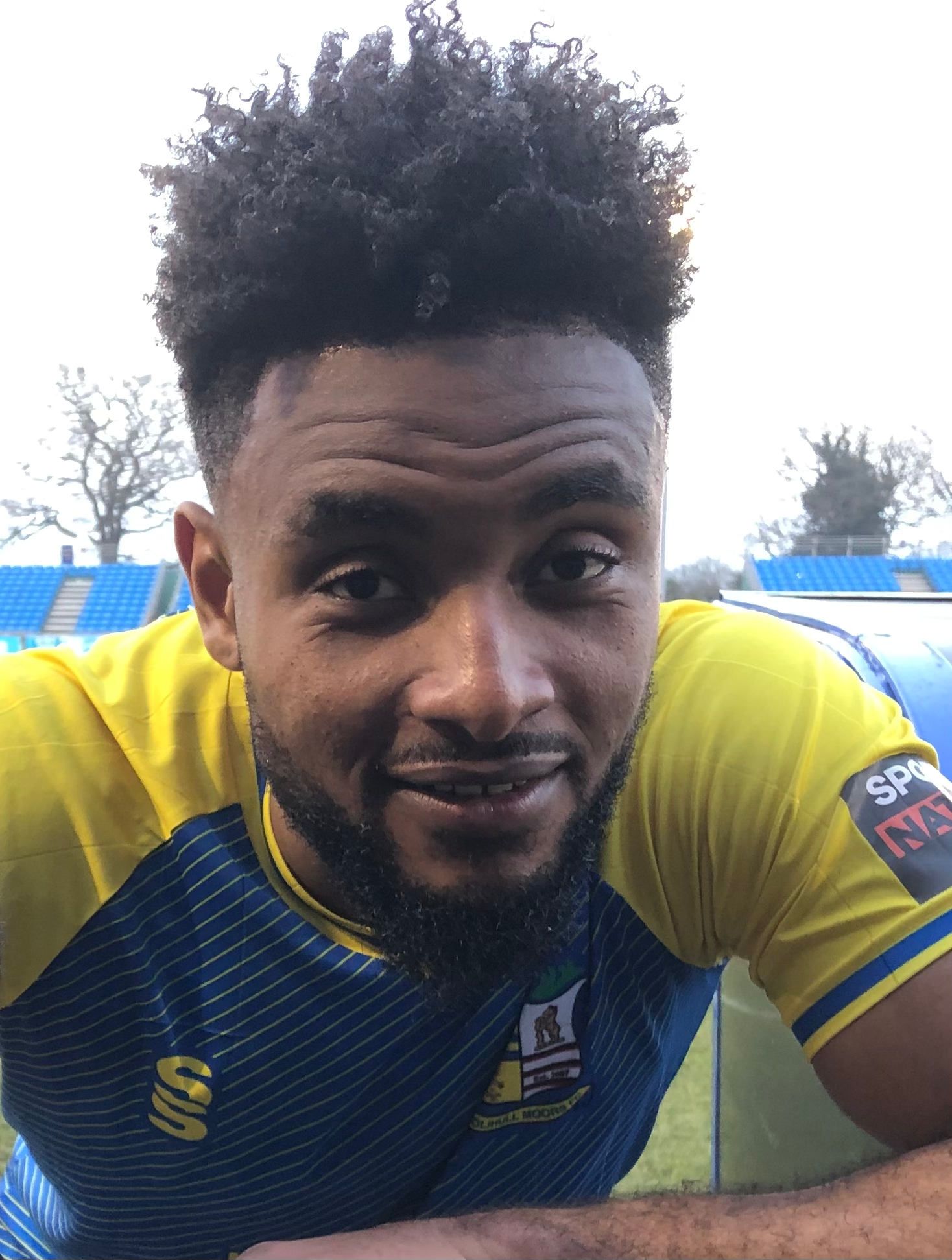
- Yussuf in 2019

Personal information
- Full name: Abdillahie Abdalla Yussuf
- Date of birth: 20 February 1992 (age 34)
- Place of birth: Zanzibar, Tanzania
- Height: 1.85 m (6 ft 1 in)
- Position: Forward

Team information
- Current team: Quorn

Youth career
- 2008–2011: Leicester City

Senior career*
Years	Team	Apps	(Gls)
2011	Leicester City	0	(0)
2011	→ Tamworth (loan)	10	(2)
2011–2013	Burton Albion	25	(1)
2013–2014	Lincoln City	2	(0)
2013	→ Gainsborough Trinity (loan)	2	(1)
2014	→ Harrogate Town (loan)	2	(0)
2014	→ Histon (loan)	6	(2)
2014–2015	Oxford City	39	(27)
2015–2016	Mansfield Town	26	(5)
2016–2017	→ Crawley Town (loan)	16	(2)
2017	Grimsby Town	11	(2)
2017–2018	Barrow	21	(5)
2018–2019	Solihull Moors	57	(19)
2019–2021	Blackpool	0	(0)
2019–2020	→ Solihull Moors (loan)	9	(0)
2020	→ Boreham Wood (loan)	4	(0)
2020–2021	→ Wrexham (loan)	16	(5)
2021	→ Chesterfield (loan)	10	(2)
2021–2022	Yeovil Town	35	(5)
2022	St Joseph's	0	(0)
2022	Gateshead	8	(0)
2022–2023	Brackley Town	10	(0)
2023–2024	Banbury United	20	(5)
2024	Kettering Town	11	(6)
2024–2025	Halesowen Town	8	(1)
2025	→ Redditch United (loan)	1	(1)
2025–	Quorn		

International career^{‡}
2019–	Tanzania	4	(0)
- * Club domestic league appearances and goals as of 18:29, 5 January 2025 (UTC) ‡ National team caps and goals as of 18:51, 23 March 2022 (UTC)

Abdillahie Abdalla Yussuf (born 20 February 1992) is a Tanzanian professional footballer who plays as a striker for Quorn.

He has previously played in the Football League for Leicester City, Burton Albion, Lincoln City, Mansfield Town, Crawley Town, Grimsby Town and Blackpool. He has also played for a number of non-league clubs such as Tamworth, Gainsborough Trinity, Harrogate Town, Histon, Oxford City, Barrow, Solihull Moors, Boreham Wood, Wrexham, Chesterfield and Gateshead, with a spell in Gibraltar with St Joseph's.

He has been capped four times by Tanzania since making his international debut in 2019.

== Club career ==
=== Leicester City ===
Born in Zanzibar, Tanzania, Yussuf began his career with Leicester City for its youth and reserve teams. He failed to make an appearance for the club, and on 21 May 2011, with the impending expiry of his contract, Yussuf was released by Leicester City.

On 1 January 2011, Yussuf signed for Conference National side Tamworth on a one-month loan deal. Yussuf made his Tamworth debut on 1 January 2011, coming on as a 45th-minute substitute for Scott Barrow in a Conference National fixture away to Kettering Town, and it turned out to be a winning start to his career with the club as Tamworth went on to win the game 1–0, thanks to an own-goal from Paul Furlong.

=== Burton Albion ===
Following a successful trial period with Burton Albion during the pre-season of 2011–12, the club signed Yussuf on a one-year deal on 2 August 2011. Yussuf's first goal for Burton came in the 6–3 away victory against Barnet on 29 October 2011. Having found first-team opportunities hard to come by, Yussuf had to wait until 11 August 2012 to score his second Albion goal, the opener in a 2–2 draw against Sheffield United in the League Cup, Albion eventually going on to win on penalties.

=== Lincoln City ===
On 23 May 2013, Yussuf signed for Conference National side Lincoln on a one-year deal. After making only two appearances for the Imps, Yussuf found more success out on loan, with spells at Gainsborough Trinity, Harrogate Town and Histon throughout the season, scoring a total of three goals in 10 games throughout the season.

=== Oxford City ===
On 1 August 2014, Yussuf joined Oxford City, signing a one-year deal with the Conference North club. On 9 August 2014, Yussuf made his Oxford City debut in a 1–0 away victory against Hyde United, playing the full 90 minutes. Yussuf scored twice in Oxford City's 3–2 victory over Solihull Moors, netting his first goals for the club in the fifth and 27th minute. On 15 November 2014, Yussuf registered his 10th league goal of the campaign, in a 2–1 home victory over Brackley Town. On 7 February 2015, Yussuf scored his first hat-trick for Oxford City, in a 5–0 victory at Brackley Town.

=== Mansfield Town ===
On 5 June 2015, Yussuf signed for Mansfield Town on a free transfer from Oxford City. On 8 August 2015, Yussuf made his Mansfield Town debut in a 1–1 draw with Carlisle United, replacing Nathan Thomas in the 74th minute. On 3 October 2015, Yussuf scored his first Mansfield Town goal in a 4–3 away victory over Dagenham & Redbridge, scoring the winner in the 85th minute. On 11 March 2016, Yussuf received a five-game ban and a £700 fine from the FA for urinating at the back of the stand while warming-up as an unused substitute during the League Two fixture against Plymouth Argyle.

Yussuf joined Crawley Town on a six-month loan on 2 August 2016. Four days later, Yussuf made his Crawley Town debut in a 1–0 victory over Wycombe Wanderers, replacing Enzio Boldewijn in the 95th minute. On 24 September 2016, Yussuf scored his first goal for Crawley in a 3–2 away victory over Morecambe, opening the scoring in the 72nd minute. On 26 December 2016, Crawley manager Dermot Drummy confirmed that Yussuf's loan deal had been terminated.

=== Grimsby Town ===
Yussuf joined League Two side Grimsby Town on 1 January 2017, agreeing an 18-month contract on a free transfer. Two days later, he scored on his debut to seal a 3–1 victory for Grimsby and end Carlisle United's unbeaten home record. Away at Hartlepool United in his second match, Yussuf opened the scoring to make it two goals in his first two appearances for the "Mariners".

=== Barrow ===
On 29 July 2017, Yussuf joined National League Barrow on a one-year deal.

=== Solihull Moors ===
On 25 January 2018, following his release from Barrow, Yussuf joined fellow National League club Solihull Moors on a one-and-a-half-year deal. He scored a brace in two minutes on his debut against Dagenham & Redbridge before he was substituted in the 69th minute. He scored four goals in their FA Cup run to the second round.

=== Blackpool ===
In May 2019, following the expiry of his Solihull Moors' contract, he signed for Blackpool on a two-year deal, with an option for a third year.

He was released by the club at the end of the 2020–21 season, after the club had won promotion to the Championship.

On 17 September 2019, Yussuf returned to Solihull on loan until January 2020.

On 28 August 2020, Yussuf signed for Wrexham on a season long loan. He made his debut on 3 October in a 2–1 opening day victory over Boreham Wood. Two weeks later he opened his account for the club with a double in an eventual 4–3 defeat to Wealdstone. On 30 January 2021, he marked what proved to be his final match for the club with the second goal in a 2–0 victory over King's Lynn Town. On 1 February 2021, the loan was terminated and Yussuf returned to Blackpool.

On 2 February 2021, Yussuf joined National League side Chesterfield on loan for the remainder of the 2020–21 season.

=== Yeovil Town ===
On 17 August 2021, Yussuf joined National League side Yeovil Town following his release from Blackpool. At the end of the 2021–22 season, Yussuf was released by Yeovil following the expiry of his contract.

=== St Joseph's ===
On 4 July 2022, it was revealed that Yussuf had moved to Gibraltar to join St Joseph's, with the striker being announced as part of their Europa Conference League squad to face Larne.

=== Gateshead ===
On 2 September 2022, Yussuf returned to England to join National League club Gateshead.

=== Brackley Town ===
On 9 December 2022, Yussuf joined National League North side Brackley Town following his release from Gateshead.

=== Halesowen Town ===
Ahead of the 2024–25 season, Yussuf joined Halesowen Town. In January 2025, he joined Redditch United on a one-month loan deal.

== International career ==
Yussuf was called up to the Tanzania squad in August 2015. He again linked up with the Tanzanian national squad in March 2016; however, he was unable play in any matches due to a suspension. In May 2019, Yussuf was included in Tanzania's preliminary 39-man squad for the 2019 Africa Cup of Nations.

Yussuf made his international debut on 16 June 2019 in a friendly match against Zimbabwe in Cairo, Egypt. He also most recently played for the Tanzania national team in a friendly vs Central African Republic.

== Coaching career ==
In 2024, Yussuf returned to former club Leicester City as part of the Premier League's Professional Player to Coach Scheme, helping increase the number of Black, Asian and minority ethnic players who transition into coaching.

== Career statistics ==
As of match played 22 April 2023

Appearances and goals by club, season and competition
Club	Season	League			National Cup (Note: Includes FA Cup)		League Cup		Other		Total	
Club	Season	Division	Apps	Goals	Apps	Goals	Apps	Goals	Apps	Goals	Apps	Goals
Leicester City	2010–11	Championship	0	0	0	0	0	0	—		0	0
Tamworth (loan)	2010–11	Conference Premier	10	2	0	0	—		—		10	2
Burton Albion	2011–12	League Two	17	1	0	0	1	0	1 (Note: Appearance(s) in Football League Trophy)	0	19	1
Burton Albion	2012–13	League Two	8	0	0	0	3	1	1	0	12	1
Burton Albion	Total		25	1	0	0	4	1	2	0	31	2
Lincoln City	2013–14	Conference Premier	2	0	0	0	—		—		2	0
Gainsborough Trinity (loan)	2013–14	Conference North	2	1	0	0	—		—		2	1
Harrogate Town (loan)	2013–14	Conference North	2	0	0	0	—		—		2	0
Histon (loan)	2013–14	Conference North	8	1	0	0	—		—		8	1
Oxford City	2014–15	Conference North	39	27	0	0	—		3 (Note: Appearance(s) in FA Trophy)	2	42	29
Mansfield Town	2015–16	League Two	26	5	2	0	1	0	1	0	30	5
Crawley Town (loan)	2016–17	League Two	16	2	2	0	1	0	4	1	23	3
Grimsby Town	2016–17	League Two	11	2	0	0	0	0	0	0	11	2
Barrow	2017–18	National League	21	5	1	0	—		3	0	25	5
Solihull Moors	2017–18	National League	13	5	0	0	—		0	0	13	5
Solihull Moors	2018–19	National League	44	14	4	4	—		6 (Note: One appearance in National League play-offs, five appearances and three goals in FA Trophy)	3	54	21
Solihull Moors	Total		57	19	4	4	—		6	3	67	26
Blackpool	2019–20	League One	0	0	0	0	0	0	0	0	0	0
Blackpool	2020–21	League One	0	0	0	0	0	0	0	0	0	0
Blackpool	Total		0	0	0	0	0	0	0	0	0	0
Solihull Moors (loan)	2019–20	National League	9	0	1	0	—		2 (Note: One appearance in FA Trophy, one appearance and one goal in Scottish Challenge Cup)	1	11	1
Boreham Wood (loan)	2019–20	National League	3	0	0	0	—		1 (Note: One appearance in National League play-offs)	0	4	0
Wrexham (loan)	2020–21	National League	16	6	1	0	—		1	0	18	6
Chesterfield (loan)	2020–21	National League	10	2	—		—		0	0	10	2
Yeovil Town	2021–22	National League	35	5	4	1	—		6 (Note: Two appearances and two goals in FA Trophy, four appearances and two goals in Somerset Premier Cup)	4	45	10
St Joseph's	2022–23	Gibraltar National League	0	0	0	0	—		2 (Note: Appearances in UEFA Europa Conference League)	0	2	0
Gateshead	2022–23	National League	8	0	2	0	—		0	0	10	0
Brackley Town	2022–23	National League North	10	0	—		—		0	0	10	0
Career total			310	78	17	5	6	1	31	11	363	95

=== International ===
As of match played 23 March 2022

National team	Year	Apps	Goals
Tanzania	2019	3	0
Tanzania	2022	1	0
Total		4	0

== Honours ==
Individual

- Conference North Team of the Year: 2014–15
- Solihull Moors Top Goalscorer: 2018–19

== Adi Yussuf Foundation ==
Adi created the Adi Yussuf Foundation in 2017 after a visit to Zanzibar island in Tanzania and saw the poverty and orphaned children on the streets. Since then he has been collecting donations and sending them to help the children. The latest project for the Adi Yussuf Foundation is to raise money to build an orphanage in Tanga, Tanzania.
