= Kevan Hurst =

English footballer (born 1985)

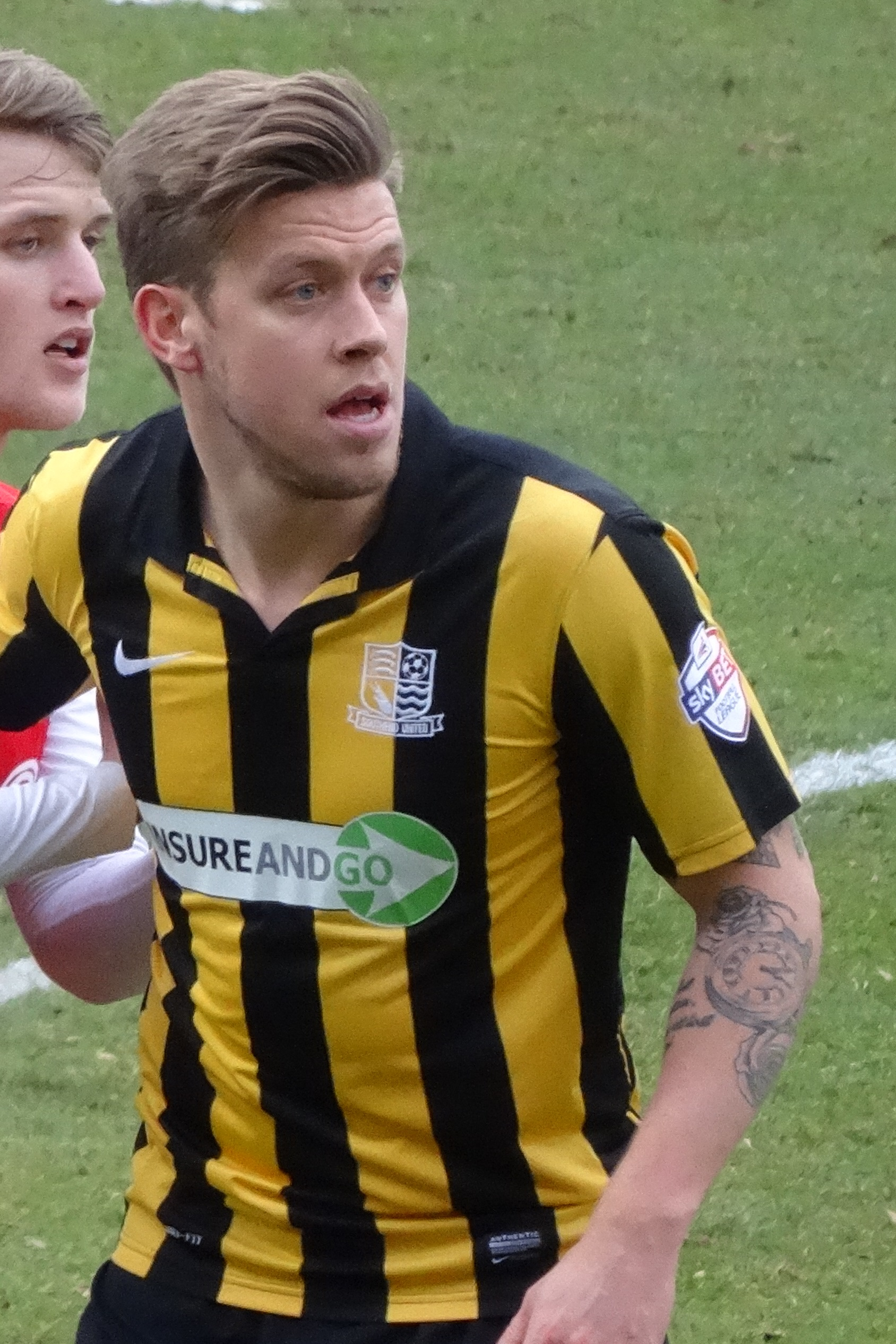
- Hurst playing for Southend United in 2014

Personal information
- Full name: Kevan James Hurst
- Date of birth: 27 August 1985 (age 41)
- Place of birth: Chesterfield, Derbyshire, England
- Height: 6 ft 0 in (1.83 m)
- Position: Midfielder

Youth career
- 2001–2003: Sheffield United

Senior career*
Years	Team	Apps	(Gls)
2003–2007	Sheffield United	1	(0)
2004	→ Boston United (loan)	7	(1)
2005	→ Stockport County (loan)	14	(1)
2005–2006	→ Chesterfield (loan)	22	(1)
2006	→ Chesterfield (loan)	15	(3)
2006–2007	→ Chesterfield (loan)	25	(3)
2007	→ Scunthorpe United (loan)	13	(0)
2007–2009	Scunthorpe United	53	(3)
2009–2011	Carlisle United	35	(2)
2011	→ Morecambe (loan)	21	(2)
2011–2012	Walsall	34	(2)
2012–2016	Southend United	128	(17)
2016–2017	Mansfield Town	14	(1)
2017	→ Guiseley (loan)	16	(2)
2017–2018	Guiseley	22	(1)
Total		369	(36)
- * Club domestic league appearances and goals as of 18:55, 10 April 2024 (UTC)

Kevan James Hurst (born 27 August 1985) is an English former professional footballer who played as a midfielder.

== Career ==
Hurst was born in Chesterfield, Derbyshire. A versatile player, he can play all across the midfield or forward line though his preferred position is left-wing. He made his first senior appearance in the League Cup against Queens Park Rangers on 23 September 2003 with his only league appearance for the Blades coming on 25 September 2004 as a 90th-minute substitute for Tommy Black against Coventry City.

Since then, Hurst has been on loan to Boston United (where he scored his first career goal against Yeovil Town), Stockport County (where he scored once against Oldham Athletic) and Chesterfield. In July 2006, he returned to his home town team on six-month loan deal which ended on 2 January 2007.

After playing for United in the Third Round FA Cup defeat against Swansea City, Hurst was loaned out to Scunthorpe United on 31 January 2007 until the end of the season. He became a permanent signing for Scunthorpe at the end of the season, in a £200,000 deal.

On 18 August 2009, Hurst signed for League One side Carlisle United for a fee of around £100,000 up front which could rise to £145,000. He scored his first goal on his debut against former side Stockport County on 19 August.

On 28 January 2011, he signed on loan for the rest of the season with League Two side Morecambe. He made his Morecambe debut in the 1–1 draw away at Accrington Stanley on 1 February 2011.

Hurst was released by Carlisle United in May 2011. On 28 June 2011, Hurst signed for Walsall. Hurst was released by Walsall on 9 May 2012.

Hurst agreed personal terms with Southend United and became their first signing of the summer, signing on a 2-year deal. In his first season with the Shrimpers, he was a key player, appearing at Wembley in the Football League Trophy final and starting over 50 times in all competitions, scoring 6 goals, including particularly memorable ones against Brentford and Rotherham. Indeed, at one point in the season, he held the distinction of having the most assists out of any League player. He finished the season with the highest number of set-ups in League Two. On 28 February 2014, Hurst signed a new two-year contract. Hurst was released by Southend when his contract came to an end at the conclusion of the 2015–16 season, a season where Hurst managed just 11 starts.

Following his release by Southend, Hurst joined Mansfield Town in June 2016. He scored the winner on his debut in a 3–2 win over Newport County on 6 August 2016. He was released by Mansfield at the end of the 2016–17 season.

Following his release from Mansfield, Hurst joined Guiseley on a permanent deal having spent the second half of the previous campaign on loan with the National League club. Following relegation to the National League North, he left the club at the end of the 2017–18 season, subsequently retiring from football.

== Personal life ==
Following his retirement from football, Hurst became a building surveyor.

== Career statistics ==
Appearances and goals by club, season and competition
Club	Season	League			FA Cup		League Cup		Other		Total	
Club	Season	Division	Apps	Goals	Apps	Goals	Apps	Goals	Apps	Goals	Apps	Goals
Sheffield United	2003–04	First Division	0	0	0	0	1	0	—		1	0
Sheffield United	2004–05	Championship	1	0	0	0	2	0	—		3	0
Sheffield United	2005–06	Championship	0	0	—		—		—		0	0
Sheffield United	2006–07	Premier League	0	0	1	0	—		—		1	0
Sheffield United	Total		1	0	1	0	3	0	0	0	5	0
Boston United (loan)	2003–04	Third Division	7	1	0	0	—		0	0	7	1
Stockport County (loan)	2004–05	League One	14	1	0	0	—		0	0	14	1
Chesterfield (loans)	2005–06	League One	22	1	2	1	1	1	1 (Note: Appearances in Football League Trophy)	0	26	3
Chesterfield (loans)	2005–06	League One	15	3	0	0	0	0	0	0	15	3
Chesterfield (loans)	2006–07	League One	25	3	0	0	4	0	1	0	30	3
Scunthorpe United (loan)	2006–07	League One	13	0	—		—		—		13	0
Scunthorpe United	2007–08	Championship	33	1	1	0	1	0	—		35	1
Scunthorpe United	2008–09	League One	20	2	3	1	1	0	2	0	26	3
Scunthorpe United	Total		53	3	4	1	2	0	2	0	61	4
Carlisle United	2009–10	League One	33	2	4	2	2	0	5	1	44	5
Carlisle United	2010–11	League One	2	0	2	0	0	0	2	0	6	0
Carlisle United	Total		35	2	6	2	2	0	7	1	50	5
Morecambe (loan)	2010–11	League Two	21	2	—		—		—		21	2
Walsall	2011–12	League One	34	2	0	0	1	0	2	1	37	3
Southend United	2012–13	League Two	44	5	5	0	1	0	6	1	56	6
Southend United	2013–14	League Two	42	11	3	1	0	0	3 (Note: One appearance in Football League Trophy and two in League Two play-offs)	0	48	12
Southend United	2014–15	League Two	28	1	1	0	1	0	0	0	30	1
Southend United	2015–16	League One	14	0	1	0	0	0	2	0	17	0
Southend United	Total		128	17	10	1	2	0	11	1	151	19
Mansfield Town	2016–17	League Two	14	1	0	0	0	0	2 (Note: Appearances in EFL Trophy)	0	16	1
Guiseley (loan)	2016–17	National League	16	2	0	0	—		0	0	16	2
Guiseley	2017–18	National League	22	1	3	0	—		0	0	25	1
Career total			369	36	17	3	13	1	19	2	418	42

== Honours ==
Scunthorpe United

- Football League One: 2006–07
- Football League Trophy runner-up: 2008–09

Southend United

- Football League Trophy runner-up: 2012–13
