= Liam Marsden =

English footballer (born 1994)

Personal information
- Full name: Liam Robert Marsden
- Date of birth: 21 November 1994 (age 31)
- Place of birth: Creswell, Derbyshire, England
- Positions: Right back; centre back; defensive midfielder

Youth career
- Matlock Town
- 2011–2014: Mansfield Town

Senior career*
Years	Team	Apps	(Gls)
2014–2016	Mansfield Town	39	(2)
2015	→ Guiseley (loan)	13	(2)
2016	→ Brackley Town (loan)	21	(0)
2016	→ Mickleover Sports (loan)	11	(0)
2016–2017	Matlock Town	72	(4)
2017-2020	AFC Mansfield	117	(5)
- * Club domestic league appearances and goals as of 10:08, 14 May 2016 (UTC)

Liam Robert Marsden (born 21 November 1994) is a semi professional footballer who is now part of the coaching staff for Retford Football Club. Was primarily a right-back however Marsden could also operate at centre-back and as a defensive midfielder. He made his Mansfield debut towards the end of the 2013–14 season after progressing through the youth ranks of the club.

== Club career ==
=== Mansfield Town ===
Born in Creswell, Derbyshire, Marsden began his teenage years with Matlock Town, before joining the youth system at Mansfield Town, his talent didn't come unnoticed, he won the SSA Young Player of the Year award for 2012–13. Nineteen-year-old, he scooped the 'Man of the Match' award on his professional first team debut towards the end of the 2013–14 season on 26 April 2014 in a 3–1 home defeat against Torquay United, as a wing-back he played in a 3–5–2 formation, which was also the first time having played in a wing-back role. He then went on to feature 13 times in the 2014–15 campaign and signed a new one-year contract in June 2015 with the club.

Opportunities were limited for him during the 2015–16 season, playing in the Football League Trophy 3–1 defeat to Notts County. On 24 October 2015, he joined National League side Guiseley on a one-month loan, he made one appearance, coming off the bench in the 83rd minute against Cheltenham. Further loan spells with Brackley Town in January 2016 making one appearance, also Mickleover Sports in March 2016, making two appearances.

Marsden was released by Mansfield in May 2016 when his contract had run out.

=== Matlock Town ===
On 22 June 2016, Marsden returned to the club where he started out as a teenager, signing for NPL Premier Division side Matlock Town.

== Honours ==
Mansfield Town

- Supporters Young Player Of The Year: 2013
