= Scott Shearer =

Scottish former footballer

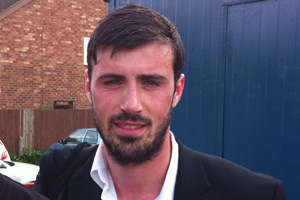

Personal information
- Full name: Scott Shearer
- Date of birth: 15 February 1981 (age 45)
- Place of birth: Glasgow, Scotland
- Height: 6 ft 3 in (1.91 m)
- Position: Goalkeeper

Senior career*
Years	Team	Apps	(Gls)
2000–2003	Albion Rovers	49	(1)
2003–2005	Coventry City	38	(0)
2005	→ Rushden & Diamonds (loan)	3	(0)
2005	→ Rushden & Diamonds (loan)	10	(0)
2005–2007	Bristol Rovers	47	(0)
2006–2007	→ Shrewsbury Town (loan)	20	(0)
2007–2010	Wycombe Wanderers	63	(0)
2010–2011	Wrexham	9	(0)
2011–2012	Crawley Town	41	(0)
2012–2014	Rotherham United	31	(0)
2014–2015	Crewe Alexandra	2	(0)
2015	→ Burton Albion (loan)	1	(0)
2015–2017	Mansfield Town	46	(0)
2017–2018	Oxford United	1	(0)
Total		361	(1)

International career
2003	Scotland B	1	(0)
- * Club domestic league appearances and goals

Scott Shearer (born 15 February 1981) is a Scottish former footballer.

== Career ==
=== Albion Rovers ===
Born in Glasgow, Shearer began his career in Scotland with Albion Rovers. During the time he spent at the club, he went on to make dozens of appearances for the Scottish side, most notably scoring a last-minute equaliser at Hampden Park against Queen's Park.

=== Coventry City ===
Not long after his goalscoring heroics at Hampden Park, he was snapped up by Coventry City. During his first season as a Sky Blue, he consistently thawed into the starting squad, making 30 league appearances and gaining considerable amounts of playing experience. Mainly because of his call up to Scotland B, the secondary team of Scotland, although it was to be his only appearance to date for the side. However, the following season he lost his regular starting place to Luke Steele and played only eight times for Coventry, playing 13 times during two loan spells for Rushden & Diamonds His last game for Coventry was a 3–2 victory away from home at Vicarage Road, the home of Watford.

=== Loan at Rushden & Diamonds ===
Towards the final quarter of the season, Shearer was twice loaned out to Rushden & Diamonds. It was quite a short time overall with the club, put the duration of it was fruitful to Shearer as he played in the majority of the matches, accumulating a total of 13 appearances for the Diamonds.

=== Bristol Rovers ===
After returning to Coventry City from his double loan moves to Rushden & Diamonds, he was sold on a permanent basis to Bristol Rovers on 27 July 2005, in time for the 2005–06 season. Shearer was Bristol Rovers' first choice goalkeeper for 2005–06, making 44 League Two appearances. At the end of the season, he had racked up 144 league appearances for his clubs. However, after the signing of Steve Phillips, Shearer lost his place in the first team. Despite returning to the team in October 2006, playing three consecutive matches, he was told he would be dropped again, causing him and the club to possibly send him out if needed or look for an elsewhere club for Shearer. And it didn't take long for a call to come up.

=== Shrewsbury Town ===
On 25 October 2006, he teamed up with Shrewsbury Town on a three-month loan deal to provide cover for a facially injured Ryan Esson. During that time, he had impressed the staff, and by the time Esson had returned to full fitness, he had established himself in the first team, causing his loan deal to be extended until the end of the season. His last game for Shrewsbury would have been the League Two play-off final, had it not been against Bristol Rovers, whom he was ineligible to face due to them being his parent club.

=== Wycombe Wanderers ===
Back with Bristol Rovers after his emergency cover loan deal to Shrewsbury Town, he was purchased by Wycombe Wanderers, and he headed there with high expectations that were soon dampened just a few weeks in the new campaign. Only five games in, he had a freak training ground accident, in which he had a fracture-dislocation to his ankle and spent the remainder of the season on the sidelines, with Wycombe having to bring in loan goalkeepers Frank Fielding and Przemysław Kazimierczak to cover his and Jamie Young's absences. His second season was much more consistent, but a re occurrence of this injury meant he would sit on the sidelines. Despite this though, he was named in the PFA League Two Team of the Year for the 2008–09 season.

=== Wrexham ===
After Wycombe's relegation from League One, Shearer was released by the club. He was signed up by Wrexham. He made nine appearances for them before quickly moving on.

=== Crawley Town ===
At the end of December it was announced he would leave Wrexham and join Crawley Town on 1 January 2011. It proved to be a successful time with the club, making 41 league appearances.

=== Rotherham United ===
In May 2012, Shearer left newly back-to-back promoted Crawley Town to join his ex-manager Steve Evans at Rotherham United in the New York Stadium. The contention for the number one jersey at the club was tough, with three goalkeepers all competing to cement a starting place in Rotherham's starting lineup. However, Jamie Annerson would later be released by manager Steve Evans due to Shearer's arrival.

He made his first appearance for the club on 14 July 2012, where he kept a second half (Andy Warrington was played in the first) clean sheet in a 6–0 victory over local club Parkgate in the first friendly of pre-season. He appeared in most of the remaining friendlies too, thus sealing his place as the first choice goalkeeper at the club. Shearer made his professional Rotherham début on the opening day of the 2012–13 season. It finished with a compelling 3–0 scoreline in Rotherham United's favour, with Shearer keeping a clean sheet. It was not to be repeated three days later however, as he conceded two goals in a 2–1 defeat to Northampton Town at the Sixfields Stadium. Shearer continued to hold the jersey, despite letting in six goals in a 6–2 defeat to Port Vale, still very early into the season. Due to an operation, Shearer was out for six weeks, meaning there was a chance that he could lose his number one spot altogether to Andy Warrington.

He was released by Rotherham on 28 May 2014.

=== Crewe Alexandra ===
Shearer joined Crewe Alexandra on 3 July 2014.

=== Mansfield Town ===
Shearer joined Mansfield Town ahead of the 2015–16 season. He was released by Mansfield at the end of the 2016–17 season having made 53 appearances (46 in the league) in his two seasons at the club.

=== Oxford United ===
In May 2017 Shearer joined Oxford United of League One on a one-year contract, as cover for the first-choice keeper Simon Eastwood. He made his first-team debut at the start of October 2017 in an EFL Trophy Group 1 fixture against Brighton & Hove Albion U21s, a game which ended 2–2 (4–5 to Brighton after penalties). Before this game, first-choice keeper Eastwood had played 75 consecutive first-team fixtures. Shearer played in a second EFL Trophy fixture in January 2018, a 1–1 draw (won 3–0 on penalties) with Charlton Athletic in which he saved two penalties in the shootout. A renewal clause in his contract was taken up at the end of the 2017–18 season, committing the 37-year-old to a further year with the club. On 11 August 2018, after Simon Eastwood broke a finger during the warm-up, Shearer played his first and only league game for the club in a 2–0 defeat against Fleetwood Town. He returned to the club in a coaching capacity in July 2019.

== Personal life ==
Shearer has spoken about his experiences of mental-health issues that plagued him throughout his career.

Following his retirement, he has become a financial advisor.

== Career statistics ==
As of match played 11 August 2018

Appearances and goals by club, season and competition
Club	Season	League			FA Cup		League Cup		Other		Total	
Club	Season	Division	Apps	Goals	Apps	Goals	Apps	Goals	Apps	Goals	Apps	Goals
Albion Rovers	2000–01	Scottish Third Division	3	0	0	0	0	0	0	0	3	0
Albion Rovers	2001–02	Scottish Third Division	10	0	0	0	0	0	1 (Note: Appearance in the Scottish Challenge Cup)	0	11	0
Albion Rovers	2002–03	Scottish Third Division	36	1	2	0	1	0	0	0	39	1
Albion Rovers	Total		49	1	2	0	1	0	1	0	53	1
Coventry City	2003–04	First Division	30	0	0	0	2	0	0	0	32	0
Coventry City	2004–05	Championship	8	0	0	0	1	0	0	0	9	0
Coventry City	Total		38	0	0	0	3	0	0	0	41	0
Rushden & Diamonds (loan)	2004–05	League Two	13	0	0	0	0	0	0	0	13	0
Bristol Rovers	2005–06	League Two	45	0	3	0	1	0	1 (Note: Appearances in the Football League Trophy)	0	50	0
Bristol Rovers	2006–07	League Two	2	0	0	0	0	0	1	0	3	0
Bristol Rovers	Total		47	0	3	0	1	0	2	0	53	0
Shrewsbury Town (loan)	2006–07	League Two	20	0	2	0	0	0	2 (Note: Appearances in the League Two play-offs)	0	24	0
Wycombe Wanderers	2007–08	League Two	5	0	0	0	1	0	0	0	6	0
Wycombe Wanderers	2008–09	League Two	29	0	2	0	0	0	0	0	31	0
Wycombe Wanderers	2009–10	League One	29	0	2	0	0	0	0	0	31	0
Wycombe Wanderers	Total		63	0	4	0	1	0	0	0	68	0
Wrexham	2010–11	Conference Premier	4	0	0	0	0	0	0	0	4	0
Crawley Town	2010–11	Conference Premier	16	0	0	0	0	0	0	0	16	0
Crawley Town	2011–12	League Two	25	0	4	0	1	0	0	0	30	0
Crawley Town	Total		41	0	4	0	1	0	0	0	46	0
Rotherham United	2012–13	League Two	19	0	0	0	1	0	0	0	20	0
Rotherham United	2013–14	League One	12	0	0	0	2	0	0	0	14	0
Rotherham United	Total		31	0	0	0	3	0	0	0	34	0
Crewe Alexandra	2014–15	League Two	2	0	0	0	0	0	1	0	3	0
Crewe Alexandra	Total		2	0	0	0	0	0	1	0	3	0
Burton Albion (loan)	2014–15	League Two	1	0	0	0	0	0	0	0	1	0
Mansfield Town	2015–16	League Two	21	0	1	0	1	0	0	0	23	0
Mansfield Town	2016–17	League Two	25	0	0	0	1	0	4 (Note: Appearances in the EFL Trophy)	0	30	0
Mansfield Town	Total		46	0	1	0	2	0	4	0	53	0
Oxford United	2017–18	League One	0	0	0	0	0	0	2	0	2	0
Oxford United	2018–19	League One	1	0	0	0	0	0	0	0	1	0
Total			361	1	16	0	12	0	12	0	401	1

== Honours ==
Rotherham United

- Football League One play-offs: 2014
- Football League Two runner-up: 2012–13

Individual

- PFA Team of the Year: 2008–09 League Two
