= Brian Jensen (footballer, born 1975) =

Danish footballer (born 1975)

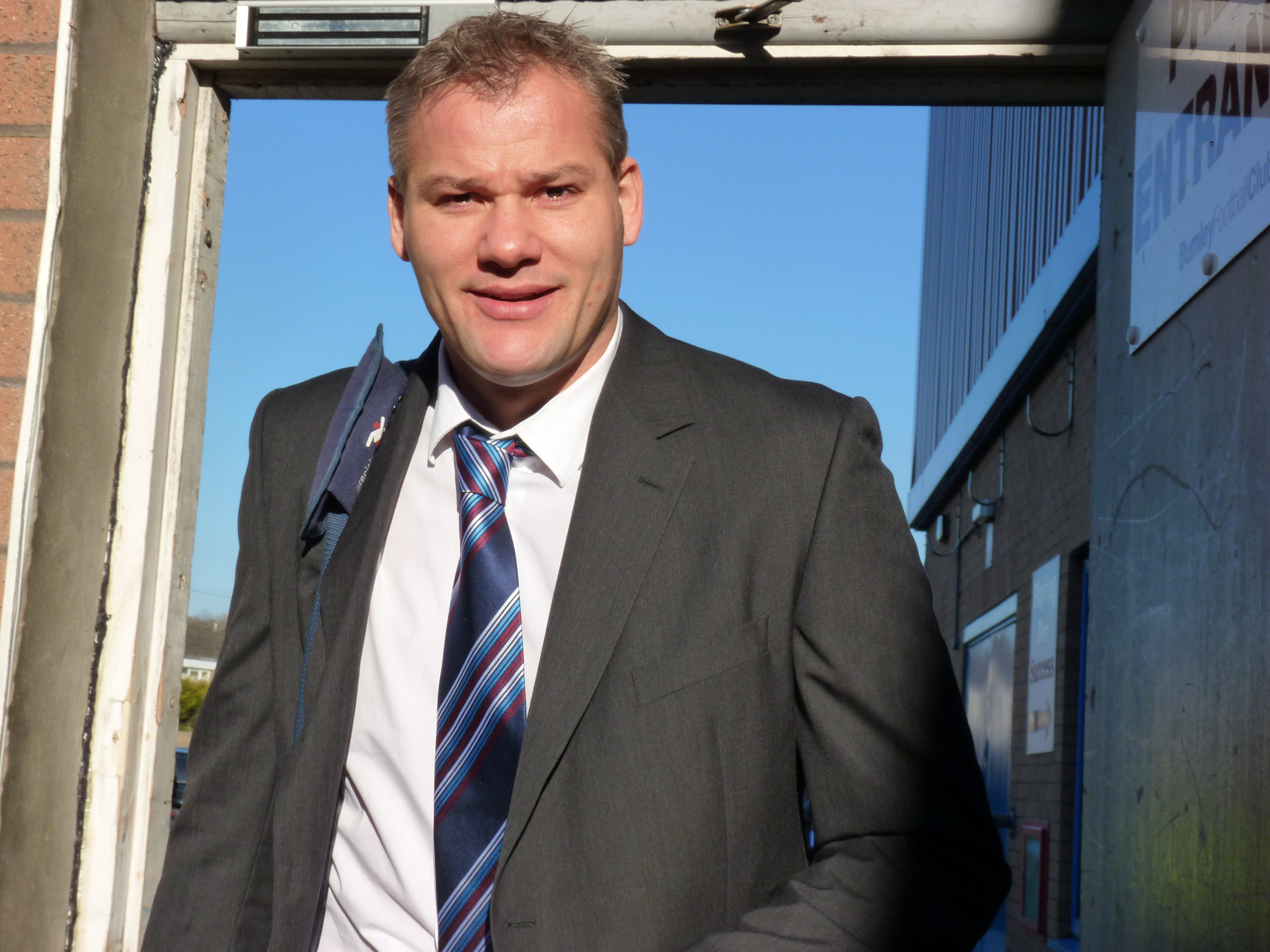
- Jensen in 2011

Personal information
- Full name: Brian Paldan Jensen
- Date of birth: 8 June 1975 (age 51)
- Place of birth: Copenhagen, Denmark
- Height: 6 ft 5 in (1.96 m)
- Position: Goalkeeper

Team information
- Current team: Tranmere Rovers (goalkeeper coach)

Youth career
- 1990–1993: B.93

Senior career*
Years	Team	Apps	(Gls)
1993–1997	B.93	2	(0)
1997–2000	AZ	1	(0)
1997–1998	→ Hvidovre (loan)	1	(0)
2000–2003	West Bromwich Albion	46	(0)
2003–2013	Burnley	271	(0)
2013–2014	Bury	36	(0)
2014–2015	Crawley Town	20	(0)
2015–2017	Mansfield Town	28	(0)
2017–2018	Crusaders	30	(0)
Total		435	(0)
- * Club domestic league appearances and goals

Brian Paldan Jensen (Danish pronunciation: [ˈpʁiːæn ˈjensn̩]; born 8 June 1975) is a Danish retired professional footballer and goalkeeping coach. He played more than 300 English league games as a goalkeeper for Burnley and West Bromwich Albion. He is currently goalkeeper coach at EFL League Two club Tranmere Rovers.

Jensen started his career with Danish lower-league club B.93, before joining Dutch Eredivisie club AZ Alkmaar in 1997. He made his senior breakthrough with West Bromwich Albion, playing a total of 50 games for the club. He joined Burnley in 2003 and played more than 300 games in all competitions, helping the club win promotion to the top-flight Premier League in 2009.

== Career ==
=== Early career ===
Born and raised in the Nørrebro quarter of Copenhagen, Jensen began playing football as a defender in the youth team of B 93. As the youth team goalkeeper lacked height, the keeper job was given to the "biggest and dumbest" player of the team, according to Jensen himself. He was a substitute to goalkeeper Jan Hoffmann at the B 93 senior team.

His goalkeeping talent caught the attention of Dutch outfit AZ when he was named best goalkeeper at a youth tournament in the Netherlands. He was loaned out from Alkmaar to Danish club Hvidovre IF for eight months, while finishing his electrician education, before going to play as a full-time professional for Alkmaar in February 1998. Jensen managed one appearance in the Eredivisie championship in his time at Alkmaar, serving exclusively as a substitute for Dutch international keeper Oscar Moens.

=== West Bromwich Albion ===
While waiting for his Alkmaar contract to run out, Jensen trained with Division One side West Bromwich Albion, where his imposing stature earned him the nickname "The Beast". When West Brom keeper Chris Adamson was asked to comment on Jensen, he told reporters he was "nothing but a beast". Jensen moved to West Brom for a fee of £80,000 in March 2000. He made his Albion debut on 7 March 2000 and kept a clean sheet in a 2–0 victory over Tranmere Rovers. He stayed at West Brom for three years, playing a total of 50 games. He helped the club survive in Division One in 1999–2000, and was a regular for much of the following season, until the arrival of Russell Hoult saw the end of Jensen's playing time for WBA in February 2001. Jensen never re-gained a regular place, playing only one match in Albion's promotion season of 2001–02. He moved on in 2003, after West Brom were relegated, finishing 19th in the Premier League.

=== Burnley ===
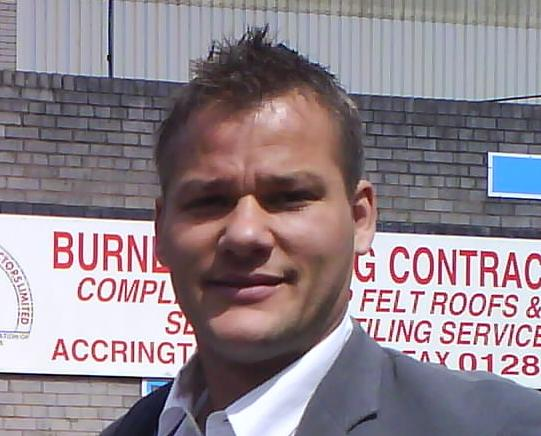
Jensen in 2007

He joined Burnley on 30 June 2003 on a free transfer. During his first season at Burnley, he was the only goalkeeper on their books. The club avoided relegation by just two points, finishing in 19th position in the First Division. After the arrival of Danny Coyne in the summer of 2004, he found himself second choice keeper at Turf Moor, but through good form and a serious injury to Coyne he earned his place back in the starting line-up. Following impressive form in autumn 2004, Jensen criticised national team manager Morten Olsen for not having watched him play, when Jensen thought he had earned a place in the Danish national squad.

After a run of performances in which Jensen's form was found lacking by Burnley manager Steve Cotterill, goalkeeper Mike Pollitt was brought on loan to Turf Moor in January 2007. In response to being left out of the Burnley team for a match at Southampton, Jensen wanted to leave the club, and on 22 January 2007 Burnley placed him on the transfer list. However, by April of that year, Jensen had not only re-established himself as the club's first-choice but his relationship with Cotterill had improved and he was taken off the transfer list.

Burnley brought in another goalkeeper, Gábor Király, before the 2007–08 season and Jensen found himself once again seemingly second choice, spending four months out of the team from mid-September. He returned to regular first team action in January 2008. He signed a new two-year contract with Burnley in June 2008. He saved two penalties to help Burnley beat Chelsea in the fourth round of the League Cup. He played in the 2009 Football League Championship play-off final, in which Burnley beat Sheffield United 1–0 at Wembley Stadium to earn promotion to the Premier League. On 19 August 2009, he was named man of the match in Burnley's 1–0 Premier League victory over Manchester United, which was Burnley's first top division win in 33 years. The performance included a range of saves as well as a penalty save against Michael Carrick. He signed a new two-year contract with the club in June 2010. Jensen played his 300th league game in a 4–0 win over Hull City on 28 September 2010. On 22 December 2010, Jensen officially handed in a written transfer request due to lack of games. However, Jensen decided to withdraw the transfer request. Jensen would then sign a one-year contract with the club.

On 6 May 2013, Jensen announced to his followers on Twitter that he was not going to be offered a new contract. Despite being released, Jensen told langebolde.dk in the interview that he ruled out retirement due to desire to play on for many years.

=== Bury ===
Jensen joined Bury on a short-term contract on 2 September 2013, and was named player-goalkeeper coach the following January. Having made seventeen appearances, Jensen signed a contract extension with the club until the end of the season.

At the end of the season, he was named Bury Player of the Season by both the fans of the club and by local newspaper Bury Times. Despite good performances, Jensen was released by the club in May 2014 after being told that he would not be offered a new contract.

=== Crawley Town ===
On 27 May 2014, Jensen signed a one-year contract at Crawley Town under manager John Gregory. He was Crawley's second signing of the 2014–15 season. Jensen made 20 appearances for The Reds before dislocating his finger against MK Dons in January 2015.

=== Mansfield Town ===
On 24 June 2015, Jensen signed a one-year deal with League Two rivals Mansfield Town on a free transfer as a player and goalkeeping coach. Jensen holds the record for being the oldest player to play for the club at the age of 40 years, seven months and nine days.

The Nottinghamshire club extended Jensen's term at Field Mill at the end of the 2015–16 season. He was released by Mansfield at the end of the 2016–17 season.

=== Crusaders ===
On 17 May 2017, Jensen signed a one-year contract with NIFL Premiership side Crusaders.

== Coaching career ==
After a playing career spanning over 25 years, Jensen launched a new GK Icon youth goalkeeping academy in Sandbach, Cheshire on 31 May 2016.

On 1 June 2018, it was announced that he had returned to Bury on a two-year contract as the first team goalkeeping coach, working with manager Ryan Lowe.

On 21 June 2019, Jensen joined the backroom staff as goalkeeping coach at League One side Shrewsbury Town. On 5 February 2026, Jensen departed the club.

On 25 June 2026, Jensen was appointed goalkeeper coach at League Two club Tranmere Rovers.

== Personal life ==
Brian is the father of goalkeeper Sebastian Jensen who currently plays for Premier League side Brighton and Hove Albion in their U21 team.

== Career statistics ==
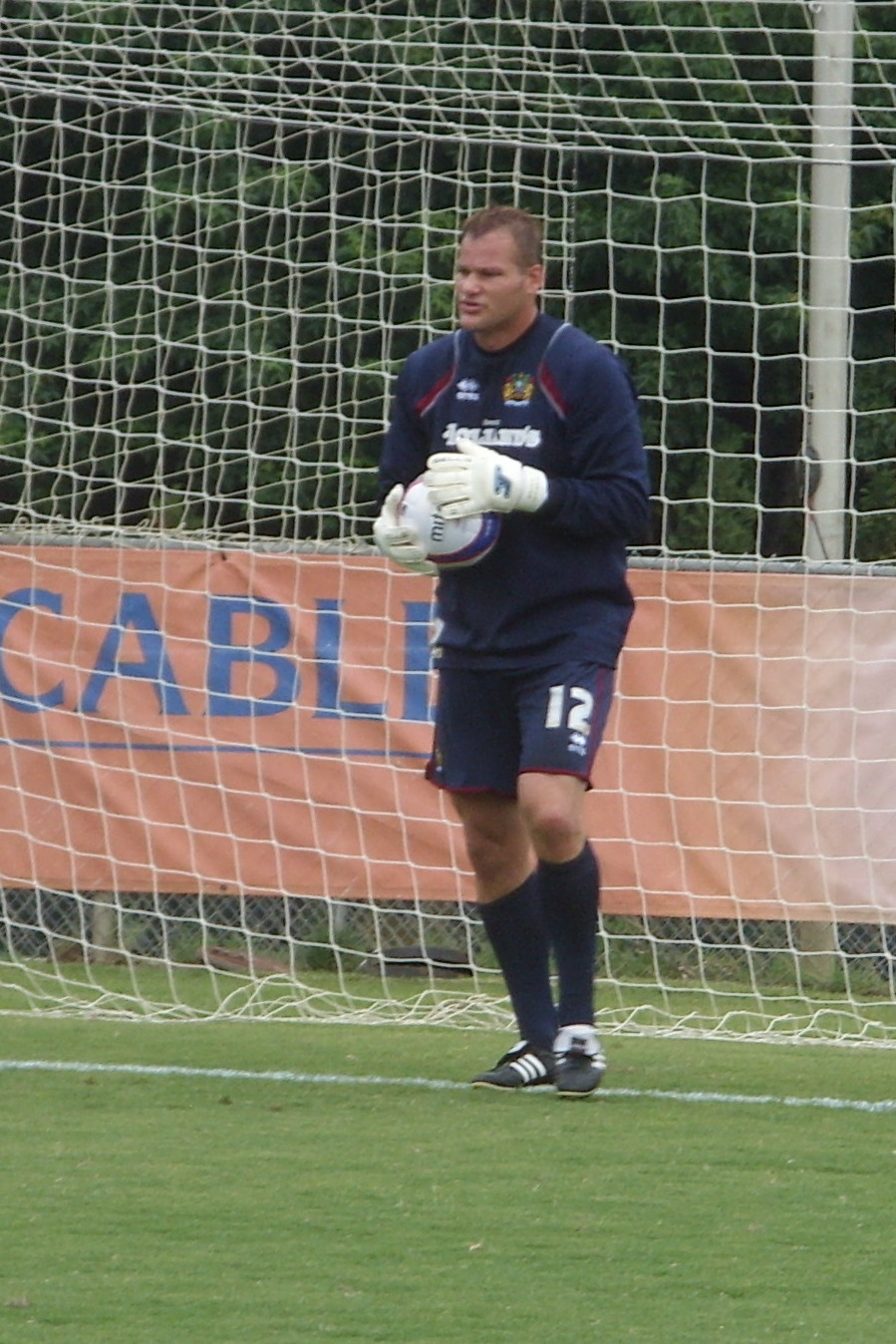
Jensen training in 2008

Appearances and goals by club, season and competition
Club	Season	League			FA Cup		League Cup		Other		Total	
Club	Season	Division	Apps	Goals	Apps	Goals	Apps	Goals	Apps	Goals	Apps	Goals
AZ Alkmaar	1999–2000	Eredivisie	1	0	0	0	0	0	0	0	1	0
West Bromwich Albion	1999–2000	First Division	12	0	0	0	0	0	0	0	12	0
West Bromwich Albion	2000–01	First Division	33	0	0	0	4	0	0	0	37	0
West Bromwich Albion	2001–02	First Division	1	0	0	0	0	0	0	0	1	0
West Bromwich Albion	2002–03	Premier League	0	0	0	0	0	0	0	0	0	0
West Bromwich Albion	Total		46	0	0	0	4	0	0	0	50	0
Burnley	2003–04	First Division	46	0	3	0	3	0	0	0	52	0
Burnley	2004–05	Championship	27	0	4	0	2	0	0	0	33	0
Burnley	2005–06	Championship	39	0	1	0	1	0	0	0	41	0
Burnley	2006–07	Championship	31	0	1	0	1	0	0	0	33	0
Burnley	2007–08	Championship	19	0	0	0	2	0	0	0	21	0
Burnley	2008–09	Championship	45	0	5	0	7	0	3 (Note: Appearances in EFL Championship play-offs.)	0	60	0
Burnley	2009–10	Premier League	38	0	2	0	1	0	0	0	41	0
Burnley	2010–11	Championship	21	0	0	0	0	0	0	0	21	0
Burnley	2011–12	Championship	4	0	0	0	0	0	0	0	4	0
Burnley	2012–13	Championship	1	0	1	0	2	0	0	0	4	0
Burnley	Total		271	0	17	0	19	0	3	0	310	0
Bury	2013–14	League Two	36	0	2	0	0	0	1 (Note: Appearances in EFL Trophy.)	0	39	0
Crawley Town	2014–15	League One	20	0	0	0	2	0	1	0	23	0
Mansfield Town	2015–16	League Two	25	0	1	0	0	0	1	0	27	0
Mansfield Town	2016–17	League Two	3	0	1	0	0	0	0	0	4	0
Mansfield Town	Total		28	0	2	0	0	0	1	0	31	0
Crusaders	2017–18	NIFL Premiership	30	0	1	0	2	0	3 (Note: Appearances in Scottish Challenge Cup.)	0	36	0
Career total			432	0	22	0	27	0	9	0	490	0

== Recognition ==
A child born to Burnley fans in 2011 was named after Jensen, with thirteen middle names after other players on the team.

== Honours ==
Burnley

- Football League Championship play-offs: 2009

Crusaders

- NIFL Premiership: 2017–18
