= Joe Fitzpatrick (footballer) =

English footballer

Personal information
- Date of birth: 20 August 1997 (age 29)
- Place of birth: Oldbury, England
- Position: Midfielder

Youth career
- 2013–2014: Wolverhampton Wanderers

Senior career*
Years	Team	Apps	(Gls)
2014–2016	Mansfield Town	3	(0)
2015	→ Sutton Coldfield Town (loan)	?	(?)
2016	Worcester City	8	(0)
2016	AFC Telford United	5	(1)
2016–2017	Boston United	5	(0)
2017	AFC Telford United	4	(0)
2017-2018	Hednesford Town	0	(0)
2018-2019	Halesowen Town	0	(0)
- * Club domestic league appearances and goals

Joe Fitzpatrick (born 20 August 1997) is an English former footballer.

== Career ==
Fitzpatrick joined Mansfield Town from the Wolverhampton Wanderers academy in 2014. He made his professional debut on 10 February 2015 in a 2–1 defeat away at Morecambe.
