= Mitch Rose =

English footballer (born 1994)

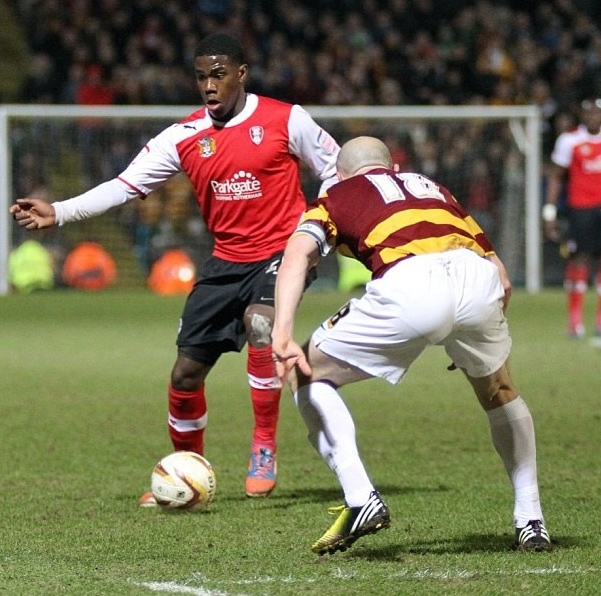
- Rose playing for Rotherham United in 2013

Personal information
- Full name: Mitchell Nigel Rose
- Date of birth: 4 July 1994 (age 32)
- Place of birth: Doncaster, England
- Position: Midfielder

Team information
- Current team: Buxton

Youth career
- 2008–2010: Sheffield Wednesday
- 2010–2012: Rotherham United

Senior career*
Years	Team	Apps	(Gls)
2012–2015	Rotherham United	5	(0)
2012–2013	→ Stamford (loan)	1	(0)
2014	→ Crawley Town (loan)	1	(0)
2014–2015	Ilkeston	5	(0)
2015–2017	Mansfield Town	52	(4)
2017	Newport County	12	(0)
2017–2019	Grimsby Town	58	(11)
2019–2020	Notts County	53	(4)
2020–2021	Boston United	5	(0)
2021	Yeovil Town	3	(0)
2021–2022	South Shields	18	(1)
2022–2023	Mickleover	15	(1)
2023	Armthorpe Welfare	1	(0)
2023–2024	Ashton United	28	(1)
2024–	Buxton	4	(0)
- * Club domestic league appearances and goals as of 16:57, 15 November 2024 (UTC)

Mitchell Nigel Rose (born 4 July 1994) is an English footballer who plays as a midfielder for National League North club Buxton.

He has played professionally in the Football League for Rotherham United, Crawley Town, Mansfield Town, Newport County and Grimsby Town, as well as spells in Non-League with Stamford, Ilkeston, Notts County, Boston United and Yeovil Town.

== Career ==
=== Rotherham United ===
Born in Wheatley Hills, Doncaster, he was part of the Sheffield Wednesday youth team before starting a two-year scholarship with Rotherham United in 2010 after progressing through the Centre of Excellence. Rose later revealed his first year didn't go well, but thanks to the club's academy manager Darren Sarll, his progress had improved. He was offered a one-year development professional contract in May 2012. After being given number 24 shirt, Rose stated he's aiming to make a breakthrough.

On 25 August 2012, Rose made his professional debut for the Millers in a 1–1 draw with Chesterfield, coming on as a substitute for Ben Pringle. His first professional start for the club came 5 games later, where he played 69 minutes in a 0–0 draw against Barnet. Three appearances into his career, Rose was sent off in the second half for a foul on Aaron Dawson in the 0–1 win at Exeter City. After making five appearances at the end of the 2012–13 season, Rose was offered and accepted a new contract from Rotherham United on 2 May 2013. Rose contract was extended further for another season.

After three years at Rotherham United, it was announced on New Year Day that Rose, along with Nicky Walker were released by the club.

=== Loan spells ===
On 11 January, Rose and fellow Miller youngster Alec Denton joined Stamford on a one-month loan deal. Their loan was later extended until the end of the season but Rose was recalled early from his loan spell on 8 April 2013.

On 31 July 2014, Rose joined Crawley Town on a three-month loan deal. Rose made his Crawley Town debut, coming on as a substitute for Emmett O'Connor, in a 4–0 loss against Rochdale. After making two appearances in all competitions Rose returned to his parent club on 7 October 2014.

=== Ilkeston ===
After leaving Rotherham United, Rose joined Ilkeston, along with five players, in late-March 2015. On 28 March 2015, Rose made his debut playing at right-back for the club, in the 2–0 home win against Skelmersdale. He sustained an injury on 4 April 2015 in the following 0–2 win at Frickley Athletic. He made his comeback three games later on 18 April 2015 in the 0–3 loss to Workington. Rose was instrumental in the club reach the end-of-season play-offs; however, they narrowly missed out on promotion losing 1–0 to Curzon Ashton in the final.

Rose made 5 appearances in the league for Ilkeston and 2 appearances in the play-offs in the 2014–2015 season.

=== Mansfield Town ===
On 15 May 2015, Rose joined League Two side Mansfield Town. He made his debut for Mansfield on 8 August 2015, the opening day of the season in the 1–1 home draw against Carlisle United. He then scored his first goal for the club on 12 September 2015 with a second half strike from 20 yards out in a 4–0 win over Crawley.

=== Newport County ===
On 20 January 2017, Rose agreed a free transfer to League Two side Newport County until the end of season. He made his debut for Newport on 28 January 2017 in a 3–1 home win versus Hartlepool United. Rose was sent off in the 3–2 away defeat at Cambridge United on 18 February 2017, for what seemed to be a foul on Luke Berry in the box in stoppage time; Rose, annoyed at the decision, knocked the card out of referee Trevor Kettle's hand. Joe Day saved George Maris' spot kick, but Mark Roberts bundled home the rebound. Rose faced an automatic one-match ban, but two days later this was overturned on appeal. Rose was later handed a five-match ban and charged by the FA with misconduct; he was also fined £1,000 and Newport were fined £2,500 for failing to control one of their players.

He was released by Newport at the end of the 2016–17 season.

=== Grimsby Town ===
On 22 May 2017, Rose signed a two-year contract with League Two side Grimsby Town on a free transfer. His contract was terminated by mutual agreement on 29 January 2019.

=== Notts County ===
On 29 January 2019, Rose signed an 18-month contract with League Two club Notts County.

=== Boston United ===
On 27 November 2020, Rose joined National League North club Boston United. He was not retained for the 2021-22 season.

=== Yeovil Town ===
On 25 September 2021, Rose signed for National League club Yeovil Town.

=== South Shields ===
On 27 December 2021, Rose signed for Northern Premier League Premier Division club South Shields.

=== Mickleover ===
On 21 October 2022, Rose signed for Southern Football League Premier Division Central club Mickleover.

=== Ashton United ===
On 2 September 2023, Rose joined Northern Premier League Premier Division side Ashton United. He had previously spent a short spell with Northern Counties East Division One side Armthorpe Welfare, making two appearances in all competitions.

=== Buxton ===
In October 2024, Rose joined National League North club Buxton.

== Style of play ==
A box-to-box central midfielder, Rose played regularly as a holding midfielder in front of a back four; he can also play as right-back and centre-back as well as his favoured central midfield position.

== Personal life ==
Mitchell's brother, Danny Rose, is an England former international footballer who most recently played for Watford.

On 9 July 2021, Rose was given a suspended prison sentence for assault on a 26-year-old male and a 26-year-old female which left the latter with a broken cheekbone.
