= Corbin Shires =

English footballer

Personal information
- Full name: Corbin Shires
- Date of birth: 31 December 1997 (age 28)
- Place of birth: Sheffield, England
- Height: 2.01 m (6 ft 7 in)
- Position: Defender
2014–2016	Mansfield Town	1	(0)
2015	→ Carlton Town (loan)		
2016	→ Bradford Park Avenue (loan)	1	(0)
2016	Sheffield		

Corbin Shires (born 31 December 1997) is an English footballer.

== Career ==
Shires began his career with non-league Hallam and Worksop Town before joining Mansfield Town in August 2014. He made his professional debut on 2 May 2015 in a 2–1 defeat away at Accrington Stanley.
