= Gabriel Rogers =

English footballer

Personal information
- Full name: Gabriel Eric Rogers
- Date of birth: 14 February 2001 (age 25)
- Place of birth: Torquay, England
- Height: 6 ft 0 in (1.82 m)
- Position: Midfielder

Team information
- Current team: Barnstaple Town
- Number: 10

Youth career
- 2011–2015: Torquay United
- 2015–2016: Exeter City
- 2016–2018: Yeovil Town

Senior career*
Years	Team	Apps	(Gls)
2018–2021	Yeovil Town	14	(0)
2019	→ Salisbury (loan)	2	(0)
2021–2022	Torquay United	7	(0)
2021–2022	→ Truro City (loan)	3	(0)
2022	→ Plymouth Parkway (loan)	14	(0)
2022–2023	Kidderminster Harriers	15	(0)
2023	Bude Town	18	(12)
2023	→ Willand Rovers (loan)	5	(0)
2023	Bideford	2	(0)
2023–2024	King's Lynn Town	21	(2)
2024–2025	Barnstaple Town	20	(7)
2025	Shaftesbury	15	(2)
2025–	Barnstaple Town	18	(10)
- * Club domestic league appearances and goals as of 14:02, 28 December 2025 (UTC)

Gabriel Eric Rogers (born 14 February 2001) is an English professional footballer who plays as a midfielder for Barnstaple Town.

== Career ==
=== Early life and youth career ===
Born in Torquay, Devon, the son of former Plymouth Argyle footballer Andy Rogers. He began his football career spending four years in the youth system of Torquay United until the Devon outfit were forced to fold their youth system. Rogers then moved to the academy of Devon rivals Exeter City where he earned a call-up to train with the England U15 side.

=== Yeovil Town ===
Having joined Yeovil Town's academy from Exeter in the summer of 2016 at under-15 level, Rogers signed a youth scholarship deal with the Glovers in June 2017. As a second-year scholar Rogers featured in a number of Yeovil's 2018–19 first team friendlies, including scoring in their 3–0 victory over Gillingham Town, and along with Tyrique Spencer-Clarke he was awarded a first team squad number for the new season. On 14 August 2018, Rogers made his debut for Yeovil in an EFL Cup first round match against Aston Villa, coming on in the 85th minute for Alex Fisher. Doing so made him the first player born in the 2000s to play for the Yeovil senior team. Rogers made his English Football League debut for Yeovil as a late substitute in their 6–0 victory over Newport County, on 15 September 2018. In December 2018, Rogers was awarded his first professional contract with Yeovil committing him to the club until June 2021.

In September 2019, Rogers joined Southern League Premier Division South side Salisbury on a youth loan deal. On 28 September 2019, Rogers made his debut for Salisbury as a second-half substitute in a 2–0 victory over Hartley Wintney. During his one month loan in Wiltshire, Rogers appeared four times for Salisbury scoring twice in a 5–1 against Amesbury Town in the Wiltshire Premier Shield.

On 7 November 2020, Rogers scored his first professional goal for Yeovil with a stoppage time winner in extra time, in a 1–0 FA Cup first round victory against Bromley.

At the end of the 2020–21 season, Rogers was released by Yeovil Town having not played since 29 November 2020.

=== Torquay United ===
On 10 August 2021, Rogers rejoined National League side Torquay United following a successful trial. On 10 December 2021, Rogers joined Southern League Premier Division South side Truro City on a one-month loan deal.

In February 2022, Rogers went out on loan again this time to Southern League Division One South side Plymouth Parkway.

=== Bude Town ===
After requesting his contract with Kidderminster Harriers be terminated to move back to Devon, Rogers signed for South West Peninsula League Premier Division West side Bude Town.

== Career statistics ==
As of match played 13 December 2025

Appearances and goals by club, season and competition
Club	Season	League			FA Cup		EFL Cup		Other		Total	
Club	Season	Division	Apps	Goals	Apps	Goals	Apps	Goals	Apps	Goals	Apps	Goals
Yeovil Town	2018–19	League Two	4	0	0	0	1	0	2 (Note: Appearances in EFL Trophy)	0	7	0
Yeovil Town	2019–20	National League	3	0	0	0	—		3 (Note: Two appearances in FA Trophy, one appearance in Somerset Premier Cup)	0	6	0
Yeovil Town	2020–21	National League	7	0	3	1	—		0	0	10	1
Yeovil Town	Total		14	0	3	1	1	0	5	0	23	1
Salisbury (loan)	2019–20	Southern League Premier Division South	2	0	0	0	—		2 (Note: One appearance in Southern League Cup, one appearance and two goals in Wiltshire Premier Shield)	2	4	2
Torquay United	2021–22	National League	7	0	1	0	—		0	0	8	0
Truro City (loan)	2021–22	Southern League Premier Division South	3	0	—		—		1 (Note: Appearance(s) in FA Trophy)	0	4	0
Plymouth Parkway (loan)	2021–22	Southern League Division One South	14	0	—		—		1 (Note: Appearance in Southern League Division One Champion of Champions match)	1	15	1
Kidderminster Harriers	2022–23	National League North	15	0	2	0	—		1	0	18	0
Bude Town	2022–23	SWPL Premier Division West	8	5	—		—		0	0	8	5
Bude Town	2023–24	SWPL Premier Division West	10	7	—		—		1 (Note: Appearance(s) in FA Vase)	2	11	9
Bude Town	Total		18	12	—		—		1	2	19	14
Willand Rovers (loan)	2023–24	Southern League Division One South	5	0	—		—		1 (Note: Appearance in Devon St Lukes Challenge Cup)	1	6	1
Bideford	2023–24	Southern League Division One South	2	0	—		—		—		2	0
King's Lynn Town	2023–24	National League North	21	2	—		—		1	0	22	2
Barnstaple Town	2024–25	Western League Premier Division	20	7	4	2	—		6 (Note: Two appearances and two goals in FA Vase, two appearances in Les Phillips Cup, two appearances in Devon St Lukes Challenge Cup)	2	30	11
Shaftesbury	2024–25	Southern League Division One South	15	2	—		—		—		15	2
Barnstaple Town	2025–26	Western League Premier Division	18	10	2	1	—		8 (Note: Five appearances and one goal in FA Vase, two appearances in Les Phillips Cup, one appearance in Devon St Lukes Challenge Cup)	1	28	12
Career total			154	33	12	4	1	0	27	9	194	46

== Honours ==
Plymouth Parkway

- Southern Football League Division One South: 2021–22
