= 2014–15 Mansfield Town F.C. season =

Mansfield Town F.C.
2014–15 season
- Chairman: John Radford
- Manager: Paul Cox (until 21 November); Adam Murray (from 6 December)
- Stadium: Field Mill
- League Two: 21st
- FA Cup: Second round (eliminated by Cambridge United)
- League Cup: First round (eliminated by Sheffield United)
- League Trophy: First round (eliminated by Notts County)
- Top goalscorer: League: Vadaine Oliver (7); All: Rakish Bingham & Vadaine Oliver (7)
Home colours	Away colours

The 2014–2015 Season of Mansfield Town F.C. was its second back in the Football League, following promotion as champions from the Blue Square Bet Premier at the end of the 2012–13 season. The club will take part in the FA Cup, the League Cup and the Football League Trophy. The club will play its home games at Field Mill, renamed the One Call Stadium for sponsorship reasons, the oldest ground in the Football League.

== Pre-season friendlies ==
† Trialist, ‡ Youth Team player, * Mansfield Town XI

Date	Kick-off	Opponents	H / A	Result F–A	Scorers	Attendance	Reports
12 July	3:00	Notts County	H	3–1	Fisher 19', Riley 23', Palmer 89'	2,331	Report
17 July	7:45	Aston Villa	H	1–3	Fisher 41'		Report
22 July	7:45	Leeds United	H	2–0	Hearn 42', 63'		
25 July	7:30	Grimsby Town	A	1–0	Rhead 44'	871 (79 Away fans)	Report
29 July	7:30	Lincoln City	A	3–1	Bell 33', Hearn 70', 77'	924 (181 away fans)	Report
2 August	3:00	Walsall	H	0–0	None		Report

== Results ==
=== League Two ===
Match	Date	Opponent	Venue	Result	Attendance	Scorers	Report
1	8 August 2014	Northampton Town	A	0–1	5,202		Report
2	16 August 2014	Oxford United	H	2–1	3,042	Tafazolli 39', Murray 88'	Report
3	19 August 2014	Newport County	H	1–0	2,448	Clements 2'	Report
4	23 August 2014	Dagenham & Redbridge	A	0–2	1,558		Report
5	30 August 2014	Burton Albion	H	1–2	2,966	Rhead 75'	Report
6	6 September 2014	Exeter City	A	2–1	2,771	Bingham 14', Bell 40'	Report
7	13 September 2014	Wycombe Wanderers	A	1–2	3,106	Rhead 4'	Report
8	16 September 2014	Morecambe	H	1–0	2,185	Fisher 90'	Report
9	20 September 2014	Carlisle United	H	3–2	3,117	Beevers 4', Bingham (2) 37', 41'	Report
10	27 September 2014	Stevenage	A	0–3	2,820		Report
11	4 October 2014	Accrington Stanley	H	0–1	2,699		Report
12	11 October 2014	Portsmouth	A	1–1	15,585	Heslop 46'	Report
13	18 October 2014	Cambridge United	H	0–0	2,925		Report
14	21 October 2014	Tranmere Rovers	A	0–0	4,092		Report
15	25 October 2014	York City	A	1–1	3,370	Carr 61'	Report
16	1 November 2014	Southend United	H	1–2	2,719	Palmer 78'	Report
17	15 November 2014	Shrewsbury Town	A	0–2	5,001		Report
18	22 November 2014	Plymouth Argyle	H	1–0	2,926	Oliver 45'	Report
19	29 November 2014	Luton Town	A	0–3	8,418		Report
20	13 December 2014	Cheltenham Town	H	1–1	3,324	Oliver 55'	Report
21	20 December 2014	AFC Wimbledon	A	1–0	3,790	Oliver 47'	Report
22	26 December 2014	Hartlepool United	H	1–1	3,357	Brown 10'	Report
23	28 December 2014	Bury	A	0–2	3,196		Report
24	10 January 2015	Burton Albion	A	1–2	3,506	Lambe 51'	Report
25	17 January 2015	Exeter City	A	2–3	3,881	Kee 57', Oliver 68'	Report
26	24 January 2015	Wycombe Wanderers	H	0–0	2,759		Report
27	24 January 2015	Carlisle United	A	1–2	3,827	Oliver 45'	Report
28	7 February 2015	Stevenage	H	1–0	2,436	Lambe 51'	Report
29	10 February 2015	Morecambe	A	1–2	1,156	Heslop 27'	Report
30	14 February 2015	Northampton Town	H	1–1	4,614	Oliver 48'	Report
31	17 February 2015	Luton Town	H	1–0	2,998	Bingham 32'	Report
32	21 February 2015	Oxford United	A	0–3	6,954		Report
33	28 February 2015	Dagenham & Redbridge	H	2–1	2,546	Lambe 46', Brown 82'	Report
34	3 March 2015	Newport County	A	1–0	2,481	Lambe 87'	Report
35	7 March 2015	Cheltenham Town	A	1–1	2,597	Kee 68'	Report
36	14 March 2015	Bury	H	0–1	2,868		Report
37	17 March 2015	AFC Wimbledon	H	2–1	3,151	Beevers 56', Bingham 87'	Report
38	21 March 2015	Hartlepool United	A	0–1	4,116		Report
39	28 March 2015	York City	H	1–4	3,133	Rhead 77'	Report
40	3 April 2015	Southend United	A	0–2	5,925		Report
41	6 April 2015	Shrewsbury Town	H	0–1	3,108		Report
42	1 April 2015	Plymouth Argyle	A	1–2	6,626	Oliver 64'	Report
43	14 April 2015	Tranmere Rovers	H	1–0	3,051	Lambe 44'	Report
44	18 April 2015	Cambridge United	A	1–3	4,667	Bingham 64'	Report
45	25 April 2015	Portsmouth	H	1–2	4,222	Thomas 68'	Report
46	2 May 2015	Accrington Stanley	A	1–2	1,921	McGuire 39'	Report

=== League table ===
Pos	Team	Pld	W	D	L	GF	GA	GD	Pts	Promotion, qualification or relegation
19	Cambridge United	46	13	12	21	61	66	−5	51	
20	Carlisle United	46	14	8	24	56	74	−18	50	
21	Mansfield Town	46	13	9	24	38	62	−24	48	
22	Hartlepool United	46	12	9	25	39	70	−31	45	
23	Cheltenham Town (R)	46	9	14	23	40	67	−27	41	Relegation to the National League

Updated to match(es) played on 23 May 2015. Source: BBC Sport
Rules for classification: 1) Points; 2) Goal difference; 3) Number of goals scored
(R) Relegated

=== FA Cup ===
Round	Date	Opponent	Venue	Result	Attendance	Scorers	Report
R1	18 November 2014	Concord Rangers	H	1–1	2,023	Glozier (o.g.) 17'	Report
R1 Replay	25 November 2014	Concord Rangers	A	1–0	1,537	Palmer 61'	Report
R2	6 December 2014	Cambridge United	A	2–2	3,869	Bingham 3', Champion (o.g.) 81'	Report
R2 Replay	16 December 2014	Cambridge United	H	0–1	1,920		Report

=== League Cup ===
Round	Date	Opponent	Venue	Result	Attendance	Scorers	Report
R1	13 August 2014	Sheffield United	A	1–2	7,929	Fisher 57'	Report

=== League Trophy ===
Round	Date	Opponent	Venue	Result	Attendance	Scorers	Report
R1	2 September 2014	Notts County	A	0–2	3,701		Report

== Squad statistics ==
No.	Pos.	Name	League Two		FA Cup		League Cup		League Trophy		Total		Discipline	
No.	Pos.	Name	Apps	Goals	Apps	Goals	Apps	Goals	Apps	Goals	Apps	Goals	Yellow card	Red card
1	GK	(Switzerland) Sascha Studer	17	0	4	0	1	0	0	0	22	0	0	0
2	DF	(England) Ritchie Sutton	34	0	2	0	1	0	1	0	38	0	7	1
3	DF	(England) Martin Riley	31(2)	0	3	0	1	0	1	0	36(2)	0	3	0
4	DF	(England) John Dempster	4	0	0	0	0(1)	0	0	0	4(1)	0	1	0
5	DF	(England) Luke Jones	0	0	0	0	0	0	0	0	0	0	0	0
6	DF	(England) Ryan Tafazolli	35(1)	1	4	0	1	0	1	0	41(1)	1	8	1
7	MF	(England) Fergus Bell	10(6)	1	1(2)	0	0(1)	0	0(1)	0	11(10)	1	1	0
7	MF	(England) Jeffrey Monakana	3(3)	0	0	0	0	0	0	0	3(3)	0	0	0
8	FW	(England) Alex Fisher	6(7)	1	0	0	1	1	1	0	8(7)	2	0	0
9	FW	(England) Matt Rhead	16(15)	3	1(2)	0	0	0	1	0	18(17)	3	1	0
10	FW	(England) Liam Hearn	0(3)	0	0	0	1	0	0	0	1(3)	0	0	0
11	MF	(England) Sam Clucas	3(3)	0	0	0	0(1)	0	0	0	3(4)	0	1	0
11	FW	(England) Rakish Bingham	14(12)	6	3(1)	1	0	0	0	0	17(13)	7	1	0
12	MF	(England) Jamie McGuire	24(3)	1	0	0	1	0	0	0	25(3)	1	9	1
14	FW	(England) Ollie Palmer	2(13)	1	2(2)	1	0	0	0(1)	0	4(16)	2	0	0
15	MF	(Wales) Kieron Freeman	11	0	0	0	0	0	0	0	11	0	2	0
15	MF	(England) Ricky Ravenhill	12(1)	0	0	0	0	0	0	0	12(1)	0	4	0
16	MF	(England) Simon Heslop	21(4)	1	3	0	1	0	1	0	26(4)	1	5	0
17	MF	(Bermuda) Reggie Lambe	21(9)	4	2(2)	0	0	0	0	0	23(11)	4	4	1
18	MF	(Wales) Lee Beevers	33(2)	2	4	0	1	0	0(1)	0	38(3)	2	5	0
19	MF	(England) Liam Marsden	9(1)	0	2	0	0	0	1	0	12(1)	0	2	0
20	MF	(England) Jack Thomas	10(1)	1	0	0	0	0	0	0	10(1)	1	7	0
21	MF	(England) Adam Murray	11(3)	1	1	0	0	0	1	0	13(3)	1	2	1
22	MF	(England) Rob Taylor	10(5)	0	3	0	1	0	1	0	15(5)	0	2	1
22	MF	(England) Matty Blair	2(1)	0	0	0	0	0	0	0	2(1)	0	0	0
23	GK	(England) Cameron Belford	0	0	0	0	0	0	0	0	0	0	0	0
23	GK	(Bulgaria) Dimitar Evtimov	10	0	0	0	0	0	1	0	11	0	1	0
23	GK	(England) Adam Smith	4	0	0	0	0	0	0	0	4	0	0	0
24	FW	(England) Daniel Carr	5	1	0	0	0	0	0	0	5	1	0	0
24	MF	(England) Junior Brown	21(3)	2	0	0	0	0	0	0	21(3)	2	3	1
25	FW	(England) Vadaine Oliver	28(2)	7	0	2	0	0	0	0	30(2)	7	5	0
26	DF	(England) Luke Waterfall	6	0	2	0	0	0	0	0	8	0	4	0
26	DF	(Australia) Callum Elder	20	0	0	0	0	0	0	0	20	0	1	0
27	FW	(England) Danny Fletcher	0(1)	0	0(1)	0	0	0	0	0	0(2)	0	0	0
28	DF	(England) Chris Clements	30(4)	1	4	0	1	0	1	0	36(4)	1	3	0
29	DF	(Northern Ireland) Jamie Sendles-White	7	0	1	0	0	0	0	0	8	0	3	0
29	FW	(Northern Ireland) Billy Kee	8(5)	2	0	0	0	0	0	0	8(5)	2	2	0
32	DF	(England) Amari'i Bell	0	0	0	0	0	0	0	0	0	0	0	0
32	DF	(England) Michael Raynes	10	0	0	0	0	0	0	0	10	0	2	0
33	MF	(England) Terry Hawkridge	4(1)	0	0	0	0	0	0	0	4(1)	0	0	0
35	DF	(England) Corbin Shires	0(1)	0	0	0	0	0	0	0	0(1)	0	0	0
36	MF	(England) Joe Fitzpatrick	1(2)	0	0	0	0	0	0	0	1(2)	0	0	0
40	GK	(England) Lenny Pidgeley	15	0	0	0	0	0	0	0	15	0	0	0

== Transfers ==
=== In ===
Date Announced	Player	Previous club	fee	Sources
27 May 2014	Luke Jones	Stevenage	Free	
4 June 2014	Alex Fisher	Monza	Free	
12 June 2014	Liam Hearn	Grimsby Town	Free	
9 July 2014	Amari'i Bell	Birmingham City	Loan (6 month loan)	
11 July 2014	Fergus Bell	Monza	Free	
22 July 2014	Simon Heslop	Stevenage	Free	
24 July 2014	Sascha Studer	Winterthur	Free	
5 August 2014	Rob Taylor	Port Vale	Free	
19 August 2014	Dimitar Evtimov	Nottingham Forest	Loan (6 month loan)	
1 September 2014	Rakish Bingham	Wigan Athletic	Free	
17 September 2014	Reggie Lambe	Nyköping	Free	
3 October 2014	Kieron Freeman	Derby County	Loan (3 month loan)	
10 October 2014	Jamie Sendles-White	Queens Park Rangers	Loan (3 month loan)	
21 October 2014	Daniel Carr	Huddersfield Town	Loan (1 month loan)	
24 October 2014	Vadaine Oliver	Crewe Alexandra	Loan (8 month loan)	
7 November 2014	Luke Waterfall	Scunthorpe United	Loan (1 month loan)	
27 November 2014	Junior Brown	Oxford United	Loan (1 month loan)	
5 January 2015	Billy Kee	Scunthorpe United	Loan (3 month loan)	
7 January 2015	Ricky Ravenhill	Northampton Town	Free	
7 January 2015	Junior Brown	Oxford United	Free	
8 January 2015	Callum Elder	Leicester City	Loan (3 month loan)	
9 January 2015	Adam Smith	Leicester City	Loan (1 month loan)	
9 January 2015	Michael Raynes	Oxford United	Free	
14 January 2015	Matty Blair	Fleetwood Town	Free	
2 February 2015	Lenny Pidgeley	Newport County	Loan	
20 February 2015	Jeffrey Monakana	Brighton & Hove Albion	Loan (1 month loan)	
20 March 2015	Terry Hawkridge	Scunthorpe United	Loan (2 month loan)	

=== Out ===
Date Announced	Player	Destination	fee	Sources
9 May 2014	Paul Black	Oldham Athletic	Free	
9 May 2014	Ian Deakin	Heanor Town	Free	
9 May 2014	Ross Dyer	FC Halifax Town	Free	
9 May 2014	Ben Hutchinson	Nuneaton Town	Free	
9 May 2014	James Jennings	Forest Green Rovers	Free	
9 May 2014	Keiran Murtagh	Released	Free	
9 May 2014	George Pilkington	Macclesfield Town	Free	
9 May 2014	Godfrey Poku	AFC Telford United	Free	
9 May 2014	Jake Speight	Harrogate Town	Free	
9 May 2014	Lee Stevenson	Alfreton Town	Free	
12 May 2014	Louis Briscoe	Torquay United	Free	
2 June 2014	Colin Daniel	Port Vale	Free	
16 June 2014	Alan Marriott	Released	Free	
1 July 2014	Lindon Meikle	York City	Free	
	Anthony Howell	Alfreton Town	Free	
1 September 2014	Sam Clucas	Chesterfield	Undisclosed	
2 January 2015	Rakish Bingham	Hartlepool United	Loan (4 month loan)	
13 January 2015	Rob Taylor	Tranmere Rovers	Undisclosed	
29 January 2015	Fergus Bell	Yeovil Town	Free	
