= Devon Arnold =

English footballer

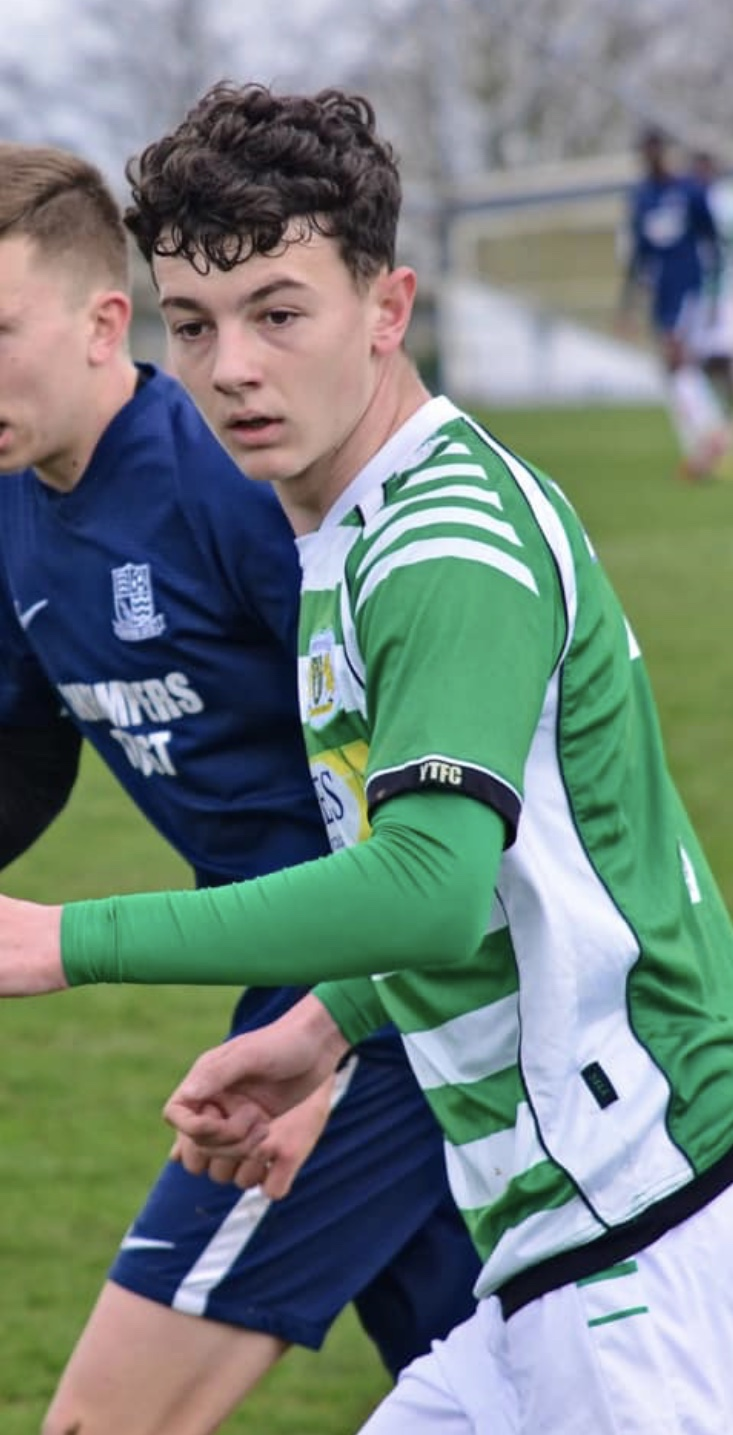
- Arnold in 2020

Personal information
- Full name: Devon Michael Arnold
- Date of birth: 24 November 2001 (age 24)
- Place of birth: Winchester, England
- Height: 5 ft 11 in (1.80 m)
- Position: Forward

Youth career
- 2016–2018: Yeovil Town

College career
Years	Team	Apps	(Gls)
2024–	Blinn Buccaneers	18	(9)

Senior career*
Years	Team	Apps	(Gls)
2018–2020	Yeovil Town	1	(0)
2019	→ Dorchester Town (loan)	3	(0)
2021–2023	Salisbury	61	(8)
2021	→ Bemerton Heath Harlequins (loan)	2	(1)
2023–2024	Winchester City	12	(2)
2025	Austin United	10	(7)
- * Club domestic league appearances and goals as of 10:42, 27 December 2024 (UTC)

Devon Michael Arnold (born 24 November 2001) is an English footballer who plays as a forward.

== Career ==
Born in Winchester, Hampshire, Arnold grew up in Tidworth, Wiltshire and was educated at The Wellington Academy, Ludgershall. Having joined Yeovil Town's academy from the Elite Training Centre in November 2016, Arnold was offered a youth scholarship deal to remain with the Glovers in December 2017. On 1 January 2019, Arnold made his debut for Yeovil in EFL League Two as a late substitute in their 4–1 defeat against Cheltenham Town, at the age of just 17 years and 38 days he broke the record for the youngest Yeovil player in the English Football League. Arnold was released by Yeovil at the end of the 2019–20 season when his youth scholarship expired.

Following his release by Yeovil, Arnold spent time on trial with Premier League side Manchester United.

On 10 September 2021, Arnold signed for Southern League Premier Division South side Salisbury.

In 2024, Arnold enrolled at Blinn College to study business and play college soccer.

In May 2025, Arnold The League for Clubs side Austin United.

== Career statistics ==
As of match played 20 April 2024.

Appearances and goals by club, season and competition
Club	Season	League			FA Cup		EFL Cup		Other		Total	
Club	Season	Division	Apps	Goals	Apps	Goals	Apps	Goals	Apps	Goals	Apps	Goals
Yeovil Town	2018–19	League Two	1	0	0	0	0	0	0	0	1	0
Yeovil Town	2019–20	National League	0	0	0	0	—		1 (Note: Appearance in Somerset Premier Cup)	0	1	0
Yeovil Town	Total		1	0	0	0	0	0	1	0	2	0
Dorchester Town (loan)	2019–20	Southern League; Premier Division South	3	0	0	0	—		1 (Note: Appearance(s) in Southern League Cup)	0	4	0
Salisbury	2021–22	Southern League; Premier Division South	21	3	0	0	—		4 (Note: One appearance in Southern League Cup, one appearance in Wiltshire Senior Cup, two appearances and one goal in Wiltshire Premier Shield)	1	25	4
Salisbury	2022–23	Southern League; Premier Division South	34	5	2	0	—		3 (Note: Appearances in Wiltshire Premier Shield)	3	39	8
Salisbury	2023–24	Southern League; Premier Division South	6	0	2	0	—		1 (Note: Appearance in FA Trophy)	0	9	0
Salisbury	Total		61	8	4	0	—		8	4	73	12
Bemerton Heath Harlequins (loan)	2021–22	Wessex League Division One	2	1	—		—		—		2	1
Winchester City	2023–24	Southern League; Premier Division South	12	2	—		—		0	0	12	2
Career total			79	10	4	0	0	0	10	4	93	14
