= Daniel Ojo =

Italian footballer (born 2001)

Personal information
- Full name: Taiwo Daniel Ojo
- Date of birth: 17 February 2001 (age 25)
- Place of birth: Parma, Italy
- Position: Defender

Youth career
- –2017: Charlton Athletic
- 2017–2018: Yeovil Town

Senior career*
Years	Team	Apps	(Gls)
2018–2020	Yeovil Town	7	(0)
2019	→ Melksham Town (loan)	6	(0)
2020	Dulwich Hamlet	0	(0)
2020–2021	Cheshunt	1	(0)
2021–2022	Billericay Town	5	(0)
2021–2022	→ Cheshunt (loan)	22	(1)
- * Club domestic league appearances and goals as of 13:40, 10 May 2022 (UTC)

Taiwo Daniel Ojo (born 17 February 2001) is an Italian professional footballer who plays as a defender most recently in the National League South for Billericay Town.

== Career ==
Having come through the Charlton Athletic academy, Ojo joined Yeovil Town in June 2017 signing a youth scholarship deal. On 6 November 2018, Ojo made his debut for Yeovil in an EFL Trophy 4–0 group stage victory against West Ham United under-23s. In December 2018, Ojo was awarded his first professional contract with Yeovil committing him to the club until June 2021. On 23 February 2019, Ojo made his English Football League debut in a 1–0 victory over Cambridge United.

In September 2019, Ojo joined Southern League Division One South club Melksham Town on loan until January 2020.

On 10 January 2020, Ojo left Yeovil after the club reluctantly agreed to mutually terminate his contract to allow him to be closer to his home in London.

On 26 August 2021, Ojo signed for National League South side Billericay Town. and joined Cheshunt F.C. on a dual loan registration deal.

== Career statistics ==
As of match played 2 May 2022.

Appearances and goals by club, season and competition
Club	Season	League			FA Cup		EFL Cup		Other		Total	
Club	Season	Division	Apps	Goals	Apps	Goals	Apps	Goals	Apps	Goals	Apps	Goals
Yeovil Town	2018–19	League Two	6	0	0	0	0	0	1 (Note: Appearance in EFL Trophy)	0	7	0
Yeovil Town	2019–20	National League	1	0	0	0	—		0	0	1	0
Yeovil Town	Total		7	0	0	0	0	0	1	0	8	0
Melksham Town (loan)	2019–20	Southern League; Division One South	6	0	0	0	—		3 (Note: Two appearances in FA Trophy, one appearance in Southern League Cup)	0	9	0
Dulwich Hamlet	2020–21	National League South	0	0	2	0	—		0	0	2	0
Cheshunt	2020–21	Isthmian League; Premier Division	1	0	—		—		2 (Note: Appearance(s) in FA Trophy)	0	3	0
Billericay Town	2021–22	National League South	5	0	0	0	—		0	0	5	0
Cheshunt (loan)	2021–22	Isthmian League; Premier Division	22	1	—		—		10 (Note: Appearance(s) in Velocity Sports Trophy) (Note: Appearance(s) in Herts Senior Cup) (Note: Appearance(s) in Isthmian League Premier Division Play-Offs)	0	32	1
Career total			41	1	2	0	0	0	16	0	59	1
