= 2018–19 Yeovil Town F.C. season =

Yeovil Town
2018–19 season
- Chairman: John Fry
- Manager: Darren Way (until 24 March); Neale Marmon (interim, 24 March – 8 May); Darren Sarll (from 19 June)
- Stadium: Huish Park
- League Two: 24th (relegated)
- FA Cup: First round
- EFL Cup: First round
- EFL Trophy: Group stage
- Top goalscorer: League: Alex Fisher (7); All: Alex Fisher (8)
- Highest home attendance: 6,123 (14 August vs. Aston Villa, EFL Cup)
- Lowest home attendance: 720 (6 November vs. West Ham U23s, EFL Trophy)
- Average home league attendance: 2,953
| Home colours | Away colours |

The 2018–19 Yeovil Town F.C. season was the 16th season in the Football League played by Yeovil Town Football Club, an English football club based in Yeovil, Somerset. It was a part of the 2018–19 English football league season.

== Background ==
The 2017–18 season was the club's third consecutive in the fourth tier of the English football league system, it was Darren Way's second full season in charge as manager. After losing their opening game by a record 8–2 score line away at Luton Town. The club's league season had few highpoints as they spent all but one week of the season in the lower half of the table and was typified by indiscipline with the club receiving ten red cards during the course of the season and on three occasions being reduced to nine men. The Glovers did record their record away victory in the Football League in April with a 6–2 win at Coventry City. Despite indifferent form safety was confirmed with two matches to spare as Yeovil finished the season in 19th place. In cup competitions Yeovil had more success reaching the fourth round of the FA Cup for only the fourth time in their history, beating two League One sides to get there, before losing at home to eventual runners-up Manchester United. In the EFL Cup the Glovers lost in the first round against Championship side Wolverhampton Wanderers, while in the EFL Trophy the club reached the semi-finals, losing to Shrewsbury Town having beaten three League One sides to reach that stage.

The end of the season saw Way release four players, including the experienced trio of Artur Krysiak, Ryan Dickson and Nathan Smith. Three players were offered new contracts, with goalkeeper Stuart Nelson quickly agreeing a new two-year contract. While midfielder Oscar Gobern rejected the offer of a new deal to sign for National League side Eastleigh, The summer also saw goalkeeper Jonny Maddison agree to terminate his contract to sign for National League North side Darlington. In late June, the club received a bid in the region of £100,000 which met the release clause of attacking midfielder Otis Khan from fellow League Two side Mansfield Town, Khan subsequently signed a two-year contract with the Nottinghamshire side. Defender Omar Sowunmi returned to the club for pre-season training having still not signed a new contract.

== Review ==
=== Pre-season ===
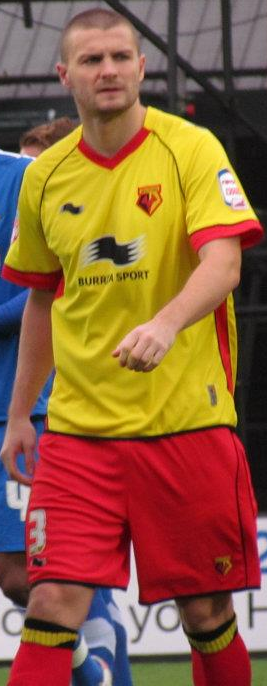
Left back Carl Dickinson signed following his release from Notts County

The first day of pre-season saw the arrival of four new signings, defenders Carl Dickinson and Gary Warren arrived on two-year contracts following their release from Notts County and Inverness Caledonian Thistle. While goalkeeper Nathan Baxter joined on loan from Chelsea and forward Diallang Jaiyesimi signed on loan until the end of the season from Norwich City. On 5 July, Yeovil confirmed that defender Omar Sowunmi had signed a new two-year contract ending transfer speculation, while midfielder Connor Smith agreed to terminate his contract before signing for National League side Boreham Wood. Prior to Yeovil's first match of pre-season the club confirmed the return of former midfielder Paul Terry as the club's new first-team coach. Yeovil's first friendly of the season saw the visit of Championship side Swansea City, on 10 July. The Glovers' squad included eight trialists, including recently released full back Daniel Alfei, Yeovil took the lead through Green but eventually lost the match 2–1. Following the match the club confirmed that captain James Bailey would be out for the foreseeable future after having more surgery following medial ligament damage on Boxing Day, and midfielder Jake Gray would be missing until September due to ruptured ankle ligaments. On 13 July, Yeovil confirmed the signing of Beninese international midfielder Sessi D'Almeida on a one-year contract with an option to extend it for a further year following a successful trial period. The squad then headed to South Wales for a short training camp, on 14 July, Yeovil played a Bristol City XI side behind closed doors drawing 1–1 with trialist Korrey Henry scoring Yeovil's goal. The Glovers followed this up with a further 1–1 draw at home against League One side Bristol Rovers with Bevis Mugabi giving Yeovil the lead. The Glovers then faced another League One side Plymouth Argyle at Huish Park. Loanee Diallang Jaiyesimi scored the opener, before braces from Rhys Browne and Alex Fisher saw Yeovil run out 5–1 victors. Among the trialists in the Yeovil side was former Notts County winger and Martiniquais international Yoann Arquin, another of the trialists former West Ham United forward Korrey Henry signed an initial one-year contract. Yeovil then travelled the short distance to face Southern League Premier South side Dorchester Town, on 24 July. Goals from Aqruin and Henry earned the Glovers a 2–0 victory. On 27 July, Yeovil confirmed the signing of Brentford midfielder Reece Cole on loan until the end of the season. The first team concluded pre-season with a 3–0 victory over Southern League Division One Central side Corby Town, before a team consisting primarily of the club's under-18 beat local side Gillingham Town by the same scoreline. After a pre-season of rumours surrounding the future of versatile Welsh defender Tom James, the club confirmed they had accepted an undisclosed bid in the region of £400,000 from Championship side West Bromwich Albion. The move fell through the following day after James failed to agree personal terms with the Championship club. On 2 August, the club confirmed the signing of Martiniquais international Yoann Arquin on a six-month contract following a successful trial. The following day, Yeovil signed two more players with winger Wes McDonald signing following his release from Birmingham City and midfielder Alex Pattison on loan until the end of the season from Middlesbrough.

Pre-season match details
| Date | Opponents | Venue | Result | Score F–A | Scorers | Attendance | Ref |
|---|---|---|---|---|---|---|---|
| 10 July 2018 | Swansea City | H | L | 1–2 | Green | 893 | |
| 14 July 2018 | Bristol City XI | A | D | 1–1 | Henry | — | |
| 17 July 2018 | Bristol Rovers | H | D | 1–1 | Mugabi | 1,114 | |
| 21 July 2018 | Plymouth Argyle | H | W | 5–1 | Jaiyesimi, Browne (2), Fisher (2) | 1,551 | |
| 24 July 2018 | Dorchester Town | A | W | 2–0 | Arquin, Henry | 606 | |
| 28 July 2018 | Corby Town | A | W | 3–0 | Green, Jaiyesimi, Henry | 277 | |
| 30 July 2018 | Gillingham Town | A | W | 3–0 | Rogers, Nzembela, Arnold | 270 | |

=== August ===
Yeovil started their League Two season with an away trip to relegated Bury, on 4 August. Before the match both goalkeeper Stuart Nelson and winger Rhys Browne suffered injuries which caused them to miss the start of the 2018–19 season. The Glovers were reduced to nine men, following the dismissals of Tom James for a second bookable offence and Jordan Green for serious foul play, and suffered a 1–0 defeat. On 11 August, Yeovil faced Mansfield Town in their first home match of the season. Yeovil took the lead twice through Diallang Jaiyesimi and Yoann Arquin's first goals for the club but the Glovers were twice pegged back to draw 2–2 with all four goals scored in the first 26 minutes. Yeovil then faced Championship side Aston Villa in the EFL Cup first round, Yeovil thought they had taken the lead just before half-time when Jaiyesimi poked in at the back post but it was disallowed for a "foul" in the build-up and saw striker Alex Fisher have his penalty saved by Villa goalkeeper André Moreira. Villa's Conor Hourihane knocked Yeovil out with a late winner. The match also saw the Glovers give a debut to youth player Gabriel Rogers who became the first player born in the 2000s to play for the Yeovil senior team. On 17 August, Yeovil secured their first win of the season with a 4–0 victory away at Notts County, courtesy of a hat-trick from Alex Fisher and a fourth from former Notts County player Yoann Arquin. Yeovil extended their unbeaten run to three league matches with a goalless draw against Oldham Athletic, on 21 August. After only featuring in two matches for the club Brentford loanee Reece Cole's loan was terminated by mutual consent. On 25 August, Yeovil won their first home match since February with a 2–0 victory over previously unbeaten Stevenage, with first-half goals from Alex Fisher and Sessi D'Almeida securing the victory. In the days prior to the closing of the loan transfer window, Yeovil secured the signing of forward Omari Patrick on loan from Bradford City on loan until January, Luxembourg international defender Enes Mahmutovic on a season-long loan deal from Middlesbrough. Finally, forward Olufela Olomola returned to the club on loan until January from Scunthorpe United.

=== September ===
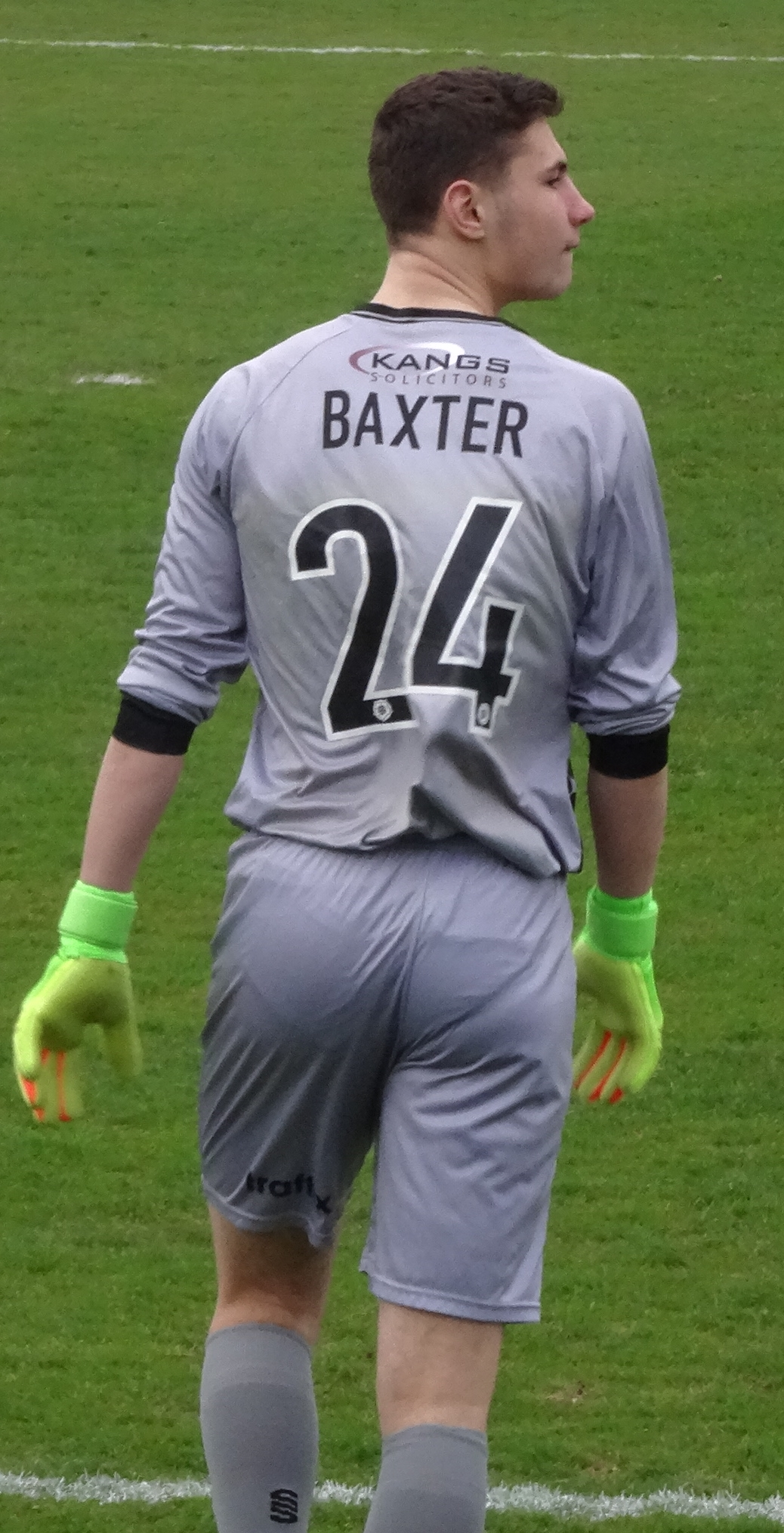
Chelsea loanee Nathan Baxter set a new club record of 9 hours and 33 minutes without conceding in the English Football League.

The start of September, saw the club announce the postponement of their clash with Milton Keynes Dons due to international call-ups, with midfielder Sessi D'Almeida receiving a call-up to the Benin national team for the first time since 2015, defenders Enes Mahmutovic called up to Luxembourg and Shaun Donnellan called up to the Republic of Ireland U21 side.

== Transfers ==
=== Transfers in ===
| Date from | Position | Name | From | Fee | Ref |
|---|---|---|---|---|---|
| 1 July 2018 | DF | (England) Carl Dickinson | Notts County | Free transfer (released) | |
| 1 July 2018 | DF | (England) Gary Warren | (Scotland) Inverness Caledonian Thistle | Free transfer (released) | |
| 13 July 2018 | MF | (Benin) Sessi D'Almeida | Free agent (Note: Previous club: Blackpool.) | Free transfer | |
| 22 July 2018 | FW | (England) Korrey Henry | Free agent (Note: Previous club: West Ham United.) | Free transfer | |
| 2 August 2018 | FW | (Martinique) Yoann Arquin | Free agent (Note: Previous club: FC Kaisar.) | Free transfer | |
| 3 August 2018 | MF | (England) Wes McDonald | Free agent (Note: Previous club: Birmingham City.) | Free transfer | |
| 24 November 2018 | DF | (Algeria) Adel Gafaiti | Free agent (Note: Previous club: Mousehole AFC.) | Free transfer | |
| 18 January 2019 | MF | (England) Matt Worthington | AFC Bournemouth | Free | |
| 29 January 2019 | FW | (England) Ryan Seager | Southampton | Free | |
| 31 January 2019 | FW | (Republic of Ireland) Courtney Duffus | Oldham Athletic | Undisclosed | |
| 1 February 2019 | DF | (England) Craig Alcock | Free agent (Note: Previous club: Cheltenham Town.) | Free transfer | |

=== Transfers out ===
| Date from | Position | Name | To | Fee | Ref |
|---|---|---|---|---|---|
| 5 July 2018 | MF | (Republic of Ireland) Connor Smith | Contract terminated by mutual consent (Note: Signed for Boreham Wood on 5 July 2018.) | | |
| 3 January 2019 | MF | (England) Wes McDonald | Released (Note: Signed for Walsall on 11 July 2019.) | | |
| 8 January 2019 | DF | (Republic of Ireland) Shaun Donnellan | Contract terminated by mutual consent (Note: Signed for Maidstone United on 31 January 2019.) | | |
| 18 January 2019 | MF | (England) Jordan Green | Barnsley | Undisclosed | |
| 1 February 2019 | MF | (England) James Bailey | Contract terminated by mutual consent | | |
| 1 February 2019 | FW | (England) Korrey Henry | Contract terminated by mutual consent (Note: Signed for Braintree Town on 3 February 2019.) | | |
| 26 June 2019 | DF | (Wales) Tom James | (Scotland) Hibernian | Undisclosed | |
| 26 June 2019 | DF | (England) Gary Warren | Contract terminated by mutual consent (Note: Signed for Exeter City on 28 June 2019.) | | |
| 30 June 2019 | DF | (Uganda) Bevis Mugabi | Released (Note: Signed for Motherwell on 12 September 2019.) | | |
| 30 June 2019 | DF | (Algeria) Adel Gafaiti | Released (Note: Signed for Truro City.) | | |
| 30 June 2019 | MF | (Antigua and Barbuda) Rhys Browne | Released (Note: Signed for Port Vale on 27 July 2019.) | | |
| 30 June 2019 | MF | (Benin) Sessi D'Almeida | Released (Note: Signed for Valenciennes on 24 July 2019.) | | |
| 30 June 2019 | MF | (England) Jake Gray | Released (Note: Signed for Woking on 25 August 2019.) | | |
| 30 June 2019 | MF | (Brazil) Alefe Santos | Released (Note: Signed for Aldershot Town on 5 July 2019.) | | |
| 30 June 2019 | MF | (England) Hong Wan | Released (Note: Signed for Wolverhampton Wanderers on 1 July 2019.) | | |
| 30 June 2019 | FW | (Martinique) Yoann Arquin | Released (Note: Signed for Heilongjiang Lava Spring on 26 July 2019.) | | |
| 30 June 2019 | FW | (England) Alex Fisher | Released (Note: Signed for Exeter City on 1 July 2019.) | | |
| 30 June 2019 | FW | (Ivory Coast) François Zoko | Released (Note: Signed for Grantham Town on 27 September 2019.) | | |

=== Loans in ===
| Start date | Position | Name | From | End date | Ref |
|---|---|---|---|---|---|
| 1 July 2018 | FW | (England) Diallang Jaiyesimi | Norwich City | 31 January 2019 | |
| 1 July 2018 | GK | (England) Nathan Baxter | Chelsea | End of season | |
| 27 July 2018 | MF | (England) Reece Cole | Brentford | 24 August 2018 | |
| 3 August 2018 | MF | (England) Alex Pattison | Middlesbrough | End of season | |
| 28 August 2018 | FW | (England) Omari Patrick | Bradford City | 2 January 2019 | |
| 30 August 2018 | DF | (Luxembourg) Enes Mahmutovic | Middlesbrough | 2 January 2019 | |
| 31 August 2018 | FW | (England) Olufela Olomola | Scunthorpe United | 7 January 2019 | |
| 11 January 2019 | DF | (England) Josh Grant | Chelsea | End of season | |
| 11 January 2019 | MF | (Romania) Alex Dobre | AFC Bournemouth | End of season | |
| 31 January 2019 | FW | (England) Tristan Abrahams | Norwich City | End of season | |

=== Loans out ===
| Start date | Position | Name | To | End date | Ref |
|---|---|---|---|---|---|
| 14 September 2018 | FW | (England) Korrey Henry | Poole Town | 12 October 2018 | |
| 15 February 2019 | DF | (England) Lewis Dix | Paulton Rovers | End of season | |
| 15 February 2019 | FW | (England) Neville Nzembela | Paulton Rovers | End of season | |
| 8 March 2019 | MF | (England) Nestor Shako | Paulton Rovers | End of season | |
| 9 March 2019 | DF | (Wales) Thomas Hayes | Wincanton Town | End of season | |
| 14 March 2019 | MF | (England) Tyrique Clarke | Poole Town | End of season | |

== Match details ==
=== League Two ===
League Two match details
| Date | League position | Opponents | Venue | Result | Score F–A | Scorers | Attendance | Ref |
|---|---|---|---|---|---|---|---|---|
| 4 August 2018 | 19th | Bury | A | L | 0–1 | | 3,151 | |
| 11 August 2018 | 20th | Mansfield Town | H | D | 2–2 | Jaiyesimi, Arquin | 2,796 | |
| 17 August 2018 | 4th | Notts County | A | W | 4–0 | Fisher (3), Arquin | 7,439 | |
| 21 August 2018 | 12th | Oldham Athletic | H | D | 0–0 | | 2,904 | |
| 25 August 2018 | 7th | Stevenage | H | W | 2–0 | Fisher, D'Almeida | 2,635 | |
| 1 September 2018 | 5th | Grimsby Town | A | W | 1–0 | Patrick | 4,284 | |
| 15 September 2018 | 5th | Newport County | A | W | 6–0 | Arquin, Green (2), Jaiyesimi, Olomola, Dickinson | 4,167 | |
| 22 September 2018 | 10th | Swindon Town | H | L | 0–3 | | 4,201 | |
| 25 September 2018 | 6th | Milton Keynes Dons | H | D | 1–1 | Olomola | 2,634 | |
| 29 September 2018 | 12th | Crawley Town | A | L | 1–3 | Dickinson | 2,142 | |
| 2 October 2018 | 15th | Colchester United | A | L | 1–3 | James | 2,435 | |
| 6 October 2018 | 15th | Exeter City | H | D | 2–2 | Green, Fisher | 4,232 | |
| 20 October 2018 | 14th | Tranmere Rovers | H | D | 0–0 | | 3,007 | |
| 23 October 2018 | 14th | Crewe Alexandra | H | D | 1–1 | Fisher | 2,397 | |
| 27 October 2018 | 12th | Carlisle United | A | W | 1–0 | James | 3,928 | |
| 3 November 2018 | 14th | Morecambe | A | L | 1–3 | Olomola | 1,406 | |
| 24 November 2018 | 18th | Macclesfield Town | A | L | 0–1 | | 1,570 | |
| 27 November 2018 | 19th | Port Vale | H | L | 0–3 | | 2,174 | |
| 8 December 2018 | 20th | Forest Green Rovers | H | L | 1–2 | Browne | 2,529 | |
| 15 December 2018 | 19th | Cambridge United | A | D | 0–0 | | 3,807 | |
| 22 December 2018 | 20th | Northampton Town | H | D | 1–1 | Arquin | 3,193 | |
| 26 December 2018 | 21st | Exeter City | A | L | 1–2 | James | 5,974 | |
| 29 December 2018 | 21st | Tranmere Rovers | A | D | 0–0 | | 5,782 | |
| 1 January 2019 | 21st | Cheltenham Town | H | L | 1–4 | James | 2,883 | |
| 5 January 2019 | 22nd | Bury | H | L | 0–1 | | 2,426 | |
| 12 January 2019 | 22nd | Mansfield Town | A | W | 1–0 | Green | 4,374 | |
| 19 January 2019 | 20th | Notts County | H | W | 2–0 | James, Dobre | 2,716 | |
| 22 January 2019 | 20th | Lincoln City | H | L | 0–2 | | 2,486 | |
| 2 February 2019 | 21st | Stevenage | A | L | 0–1 | | 2,157 | |
| 5 February 2019 | 21st | Cheltenham Town | A | L | 0–1 | | 2,457 | |
| 9 February 2019 | 21st | Grimsby Town | H | L | 1–3 | Fisher | 2,692 | |
| 12 February 2019 | 21st | Oldham Athletic | A | L | 1–4 | Mugabi | 3,868 | |
| 16 February 2019 | 22nd | Forest Green Rovers | A | L | 0–3 | | 2,449 | |
| 23 February 2019 | 21st | Cambridge United | H | W | 1–0 | Duffus | 2,596 | |
| 2 March 2019 | 20th | Morecambe | H | W | 3–2 | Abrahams (2), Seager | 2,521 | |
| 8 March 2019 | 20th | Lincoln City | A | L | 0–1 | | 9,014 | |
| 12 March 2019 | 22nd | Port Vale | A | L | 0–3 | | 3,430 | |
| 16 March 2019 | 22nd | Macclesfield Town | H | L | 0–2 | | 2,899 | |
| 23 March 2019 | 22nd | Milton Keynes Dons | A | L | 0–2 | | 7,593 | |
| 30 March 2019 | 22nd | Newport County | H | L | 1–3 | James | 3,983 | |
| 6 April 2019 | 22nd | Swindon Town | A | D | 1–1 | Gafaiti | 6,645 | |
| 13 April 2019 | 23rd | Crawley Town | H | L | 0–1 | | 3,232 | |
| 19 April 2019 | 23rd | Crewe Alexandra | A | L | 0–2 | | 3,410 | |
| 22 April 2019 | 23rd | Colchester United | H | D | 1–1 | Gray | 3,370 | |
| 27 April 2019 | 24th | Northampton Town | A | D | 2–2 | Abrahams (pen), Gray | 4,908 | |
| 4 May 2019 | 24th | Carlisle United | H | D | 0–0 | | 3,418 | |

==== League table ====
| Pos | Team | Pld | W | D | L | GF | GA | GD | Pts | Promotion, qualification or relegation |
|---|---|---|---|---|---|---|---|---|---|---|
| 20 | Port Vale | 46 | 12 | 13 | 21 | 39 | 55 | −16 | 49 | |
| 21 | Cambridge United | 46 | 12 | 11 | 23 | 40 | 66 | −26 | 47 | |
| 22 | Macclesfield Town | 46 | 10 | 14 | 22 | 48 | 74 | −26 | 44 | |
| 23 | Notts County (R) | 46 | 9 | 14 | 23 | 48 | 84 | −36 | 41 | Relegation to the National League |
| 24 | Yeovil Town (R) | 46 | 9 | 13 | 24 | 41 | 66 | −25 | 40 | Relegation to the National League |

Source: EFL Official Website
Rules for classification: 1) Points; 2) Goal difference; 3) Number of goals scored; 4) Head-to-head results
(R) Relegated

=== FA Cup ===
FA Cup match details
| Round | Date | Opponents | Venue | Result | Score F–A | Scorers | Attendance | Ref |
|---|---|---|---|---|---|---|---|---|
| First round | 10 November 2018 | Stockport County | H | L | 1–3 | Fisher | 2,550 | |

=== EFL Cup ===
EFL Cup match details
| Round | Date | Opponents | Venue | Result | Score F–A | Scorers | Attendance | Ref |
|---|---|---|---|---|---|---|---|---|
| First round | 14 August 2018 | Aston Villa | H | L | 0–1 | | 6,123 | |

=== EFL Trophy ===
EFL Trophy match details
| Round | Date | Opponents | Venue | Result | Score F–A | Scorers | Attendance | Ref |
|---|---|---|---|---|---|---|---|---|
| Southern Group D | 4 September 2018 | Exeter City | H | D | 0–0^{[A]} | | 1,518 | |
| Southern Group D | 9 October 2018 | Bristol Rovers | A | L | 0–2 | | 1,179 | |
| Southern Group D | 6 November 2018 | West Ham U23s | H | W | 4–0 | Donnellan, Akinola (og), James, Mahmutovic | 720 | |

==== Group table ====
| Pos | Lge | Team | Pld | W | PW | PL | L | GF | GA | GD | Pts | Qualification |
|---|---|---|---|---|---|---|---|---|---|---|---|---|
| 1 | L2 | Exeter City | 3 | 2 | 1 | 0 | 0 | 4 | 0 | +4 | 8 | Round 2 |
| 2 | L1 | Bristol Rovers | 3 | 2 | 0 | 0 | 1 | 4 | 2 | +2 | 6 | Round 2 |
| 3 | L2 | Yeovil Town | 3 | 1 | 0 | 1 | 1 | 4 | 2 | +2 | 4 | |
| 4 | ACA | West Ham United U21 | 3 | 0 | 0 | 0 | 3 | 0 | 8 | −8 | 0 | |

Source: EFL.com

== Squad statistics ==
Numbers in parentheses denote appearances as substitute.
Players with squad numbers struck through and marked † left the club during the playing season.
Players with names in italics and marked * were on loan from another club for the whole of their season with Yeovil.
Players listed with no appearances have been in the matchday squad but only as unused substitutes.
Key to positions: GK – Goalkeeper; DF – Defender; MF – Midfielder; FW – Forward

| No. | Pos. | Nat. | Name | Apps | Goals | Apps | Goals | Apps | Goals | Apps | Goals | Apps | Goals | Yellow card | Red card |
| No. | Pos. | Nat. | Name | League | | FA Cup | | EFL Cup | | EFL Trophy | | Total | | Discipline | |
|---|---|---|---|---|---|---|---|---|---|---|---|---|---|---|---|
| 1 | GK | ENG | Stuart Nelson | 12 | 0 | 0 | 0 | 0 | 0 | 1 | 0 | 13 | 0 | 0 | 0 |
| 2 | DF | ALG | Adel Gafaiti | 21 (1) | 1 | 0 | 0 | 0 | 0 | 0 | 0 | 21 (1) | 1 | 7 | 1 |
| 3 | DF | ENG | Carl Dickinson | 32 (1) | 2 | 1 | 0 | 1 | 0 | 2 | 0 | 36 (1) | 2 | 6 | 0 |
| 4 | DF | ENG | Gary Warren | 24 (2) | 0 | 0 | 0 | 1 | 0 | 1 | 0 | 26 (2) | 0 | 6 | 0 |
| 5 | DF | UGA | Bevis Mugabi | 27 (5) | 1 | 1 | 0 | 0 | 0 | 2 | 0 | 30 (5) | 1 | 1 | 0 |
| 6 | DF | ENG | Omar Sowunmi | 17 | 0 | 0 | 0 | 1 | 0 | 1 | 0 | 19 | 0 | 3 | 0 |
| 7 | MF | ATG | Rhys Browne | 17 (11) | 1 | 0 (1) | 0 | 0 | 0 | 1 | 0 | 18 (12) | 1 | 3 | 0 |
| ~~8~~ † | MF | ENG | Reece Cole * | 0 (1) | 0 | 0 | 0 | 1 | 0 | 0 | 0 | 1 (1) | 0 | 0 | 0 |
| ~~8~~ † | FW | ENG | Omari Patrick * | 1 (8) | 1 | 0 (1) | 0 | 0 | 0 | 2 (1) | 0 | 3 (10) | 1 | 0 | 0 |
| 8 | MF | ENG | Matt Worthington | 12 (3) | 0 | 0 | 0 | 0 | 0 | 0 | 0 | 12 (3) | 0 | 2 | 0 |
| 9 | FW | ENG | Alex Fisher | 26 (14) | 7 | 1 | 1 | 1 | 0 | 1 | 0 | 29 (14) | 8 | 3 | 0 |
| 10 | MF | ENG | Jake Gray | 19 (11) | 2 | 1 | 0 | 0 | 0 | 3 | 0 | 23 (11) | 2 | 2 | 0 |
| ~~11~~ † | MF | ENG | Jordan Green | 16 (3) | 4 | 0 | 0 | 0 | 0 | 2 | 0 | 18 (3) | 4 | 2 | 1 |
| 11 | FW | IRL | Courtney Duffus | 9 (7) | 1 | 0 | 0 | 0 | 0 | 0 | 0 | 9 (7) | 1 | 1 | 0 |
| 12 | GK | ENG | Nathan Baxter * | 34 | 0 | 1 | 0 | 1 | 0 | 2 | 0 | 38 | 0 | 4 | 0 |
| 13 | FW | CIV | François Zoko | 16 (10) | 0 | 0 (1) | 0 | 0 | 0 | 0 (1) | 0 | 16 (12) | 0 | 5 | 0 |
| ~~14~~ † | FW | ENG | Diallang Jaiyesimi * | 9 | 2 | 0 | 0 | 1 | 0 | 0 (1) | 0 | 10 (1) | 2 | 0 | 0 |
| 15 | MF | ENG | Gabriel Rogers | 2 (2) | 0 | 0 | 0 | 0 (1) | 0 | 0 (2) | 0 | 2 (5) | 0 | 0 | 0 |
| 16 | FW | ENG | Tristan Abrahams * | 11 (4) | 3 | 0 | 0 | 0 | 0 | 0 | 0 | 11 (4) | 3 | 3 | 0 |
| 17 | MF | ENG | Alex Pattison * | 24 (4) | 0 | 1 | 0 | 0 (1) | 0 | 2 (1) | 0 | 27 (6) | 0 | 6 | 0 |
| 18 | FW | MTQ | Yoann Arquin | 22 (10) | 4 | 0 | 0 | 1 | 0 | 2 (1) | 0 | 25 (11) | 4 | 1 | 0 |
| ~~19~~ † | FW | ENG | Korrey Henry | 0 (4) | 0 | 0 | 0 | 0 (1) | 0 | 0 | 0 | 0 (5) | 0 | 0 | 0 |
| 20 | MF | BEN | Sessi D'Almeida | 34 (1) | 1 | 1 | 0 | 1 | 0 | 0 | 0 | 36 (1) | 1 | 14 | 0 |
| ~~21~~ † | MF | ENG | Wes McDonald | 8 (1) | 0 | 1 | 0 | 1 | 0 | 0 (1) | 0 | 10 (2) | 0 | 0 | 0 |
| 21 | DF | ENG | Josh Grant * | 8 | 0 | 0 | 0 | 0 | 0 | 0 | 0 | 8 | 0 | 1 | 0 |
| 22 | MF | ENG | Tyrique Clarke | 0 | 0 | 0 | 0 | 0 | 0 | 0 | 0 | 0 | 0 | 0 | 0 |
| 23 | DF | WAL | Tom James | 37 (1) | 6 | 1 | 0 | 1 | 0 | 2 | 1 | 41 (1) | 7 | 5 | 2 |
| ~~24~~ † | FW | ENG | Olufela Olomola * | 10 (7) | 3 | 1 | 0 | 0 | 0 | 3 | 0 | 14 (7) | 3 | 1 | 0 |
| 24 | DF | ENG | Craig Alcock | 4 | 0 | 0 | 0 | 0 | 0 | 0 | 0 | 4 | 0 | 2 | 1 |
| ~~25~~ † | GK | ENG | Steve Phillips | 0 | 0 | 0 | 0 | 0 | 0 | 0 | 0 | 0 | 0 | 0 | 0 |
| 25 | MF | ROU | Alex Dobre * | 21 | 1 | 0 | 0 | 0 | 0 | 0 | 0 | 21 | 1 | 1 | 0 |
| 26 | DF | ITA | Daniel Ojo | 4 (2) | 0 | 0 | 0 | 0 | 0 | 1 | 0 | 5 (2) | 0 | 1 | 0 |
| ~~27~~ † | DF | IRL | Shaun Donnellan | 10 (1) | 0 | 1 | 0 | 0 | 0 | 2 | 1 | 13 (1) | 1 | 0 | 0 |
| 27 | FW | ENG | Ryan Seager | 2 (9) | 1 | 0 | 0 | 0 | 0 | 0 | 0 | 2 (9) | 1 | 0 | 0 |
| 28 | FW | ENG | Devon Arnold | 0 (1) | 0 | 0 | 0 | 0 | 0 | 0 | 0 | 0 (1) | 0 | 0 | 0 |
| ~~29~~ † | DF | LUX | Enes Mahmutovic * | 3 (1) | 0 | 0 | 0 | 0 | 0 | 1 | 1 | 4 (1) | 1 | 1 | 0 |
| 29 | MF | WAL | Alex John | 0 | 0 | 0 | 0 | 0 | 0 | 0 | 0 | 0 | 0 | 0 | 0 |
| 30 | MF | BRA | Alefe Santos | 15 (2) | 0 | 0 | 0 | 0 | 0 | 2 | 0 | 17 (2) | 0 | 4 | 0 |
| 31 | GK | ENG | Tommy Scott | 0 | 0 | 0 | 0 | 0 | 0 | 0 | 0 | 0 | 0 | 0 | 0 |

Players not included in matchday squads
| No. | Pos. | Nat. | Name |
|---|---|---|---|
| ~~16~~ † | MF | ENG | James Bailey |

=== Suspensions ===
| Player | Date Received | Offence | Length of suspension | |
|---|---|---|---|---|
| Tom James | (yellow card) (yellow-red card) v Bury, 4 August | Second bookable offence | 1 match | Mansfield Town (H), League Two |
| Jordan Green | (red card) v Bury, 4 August | Serious foul play | 3 matches | Mansfield Town (H), League Two; Aston Villa (H), EFL Cup; Notts County (A), League Two |
| Sessi D'Almeida | (yellow card) v Exeter City, 6 October | Five cautions | 1 match | Tranmere Rovers (H), League Two |
| Tom James | (red card) v Cheltenham Town, 5 February | Serious foul play | 4 matches | Grimsby Town (H), Oldham Athletic (A), Forest Green Rovers (A), Cambridge United (H), League Two |
| Craig Alcock | (yellow card) (yellow-red card) v Grimsby Town, 12 February | Second bookable offence | 1 match | Oldham Athletic (A), League Two |
| Sessi D'Almeida | (yellow card) v Port Vale, 12 March | Ten cautions | 2 matches | Macclesfield Town (H), Milton Keynes Dons (A), League Two |
| Adel Gafaiti | (red card) v Crewe Alexandra, 19 April | Violent conduct | 3 matches | Colchester United (H), Northampton Town (A), Carlisle United (H), League Two |

== Footnotes ==
A. Exeter City won 4–3 in a penalty shootout following a 0–0 draw in normal time.

== See also ==
- 2018–19 in English football
- List of Yeovil Town F.C. seasons
