= Liam Hearn =

English footballer and coach

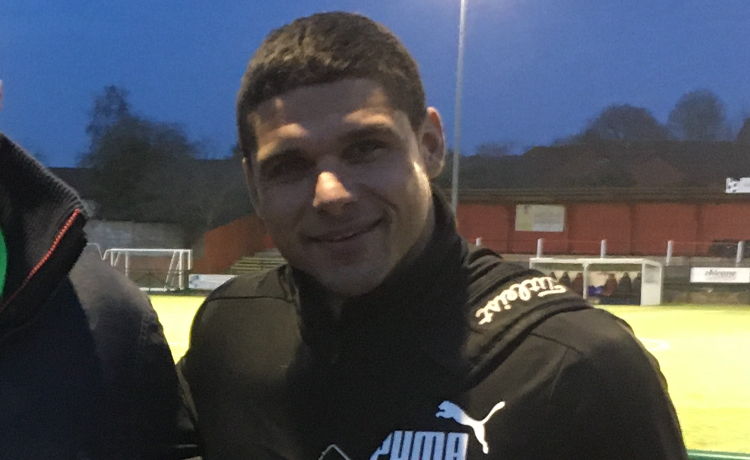
- Hearn in February 2020

Personal information
- Full name: Liam Michael Aaron Hearn
- Date of birth: 27 August 1985 (age 41)
- Place of birth: Nottingham, England
- Height: 5 ft 11 in (1.80 m)
- Position: Forward

Team information
- Current team: Sheffield United (Youth Coach)

Youth career
- Santos FC
- Hucknall Town

Senior career*
Years	Team	Apps	(Gls)
2003–2004	Hucknall Town		
2006–2007	Hucknall Town		
2007	Eastwood Town		
2007	Chasetown		
2007–2008	Quorn		
2008–2011	Alfreton Town	94	(65)
2011–2014	Grimsby Town	61	(33)
2014–2015	Mansfield Town	3	(0)
2015–2016	Lincoln City	21	(10)
2015	→ Barrow (loan)	1	(0)
2016	→ Harrogate Town (loan)	3	(1)
2016	Ilkeston	1	(0)
2016–2017	Alfreton Town	34	(10)
2017–2020	Basford United		
2020	→ Tamworth (loan)	4	(1)
2020	Hucknall Town	1	(1)
2021–2022	Quorn		
2022	Basford United		

International career
2009	England C	1	(0)

Managerial career
- 2019: Basford United (interim)
- * Club domestic league appearances and goals as of 21:15, 14 March 2020 (UTC)

Liam Michael Aaron Hearn (born 27 August 1985) is an English football coach and former footballer. He is individual striker coach for the youth academy at EFL Championship side Sheffield United.

Hearn played professionally as a forward for three clubs with a brief spell at Mansfield Town representing his only time spent in the Football League. He most notably spent three years playing for Grimsby Town during their spell in the National League. He managed to score 33 goals in 61 League appearances during his time with The Mariners earning several individual awards. He also spent time with Lincoln City again whilst the club were in a spell of Non-League football. At semi-professional level he has turned out for host of clubs which includes several spells with Alfreton Town with the first yielding 65 goals in 94 games. He has also played for Hucknall Town, Eastwood Town, Quorn, Chasetown, Barrow, Harrogate Town, Ilkeston, Basford United and Tamworth. In 2009 he was capped by the England C team.

Since retiring, Hearn has worked predominantly as a youth team coach for Ilkeston and Alfreton Town before a spell as interim manager back with Basford United. He has also worked for Mansfield Town, Derby County and Sheffield United.

== Club career ==
=== Early career ===
Hearn was born in Nottingham, Nottinghamshire. began his career in the Central Midlands League with Santos FC where he was spotted by Hucknall Town scouts at one of his games. He joined Hucknall in the 2003–04 season and he went on to be top goal scorer at Watnall Road. During his debut season, and at the age of 19, he finished with 16 goals in the Northern Premier League. He moved on to Eastwood Town another Nottinghamshire based team, before joining Chasetown in the summer.

In Christmas 2006, he joined Leicestershire-based Northern Premier League Division One South team Quorn where he scored 13 times in the remainder of the season. Hearn then scored six in the 2008–09 season campaign before moving to Alfreton Town.

=== Alfreton Town ===
Hearn completed his move to Alfreton Town on 22 September 2008, Alfreton having beaten off interest from a number of other clubs to clinch his signature.

On 22 November 2008 in the FA Trophy third qualifying round, Hearn came on as a last minute substitute and scored against Blyth Spartans to win the game 4–3 and to assure them to a victory to advance to the next round.

Hearn was called up to the England national football C team – along with teammate Paul Clayton – to play a friendly against Malta under-21s at Hibernian in Paola on 17 February 2009. However, due to having no passport Hearn was unable to make the call up even though dispensation from the Home Office to speed up the process to two weeks was not enough.

Alfreton Town manager Nicky Law hailed Liam Hearn "He is probably the best ever find I have made in football management anywhere."

At Alfreton he scored 71 goals in 110 appearances. The striker netted 31 goals in his final season as Alfreton won promotion to the Conference Premier, finishing the top scorer in the Conference North, this also earned him the divisional player of the year award in the 2010–11 season.

=== Grimsby Town ===
==== 2011–12 ====
Hearn signed a three-year contract with Grimsby Town on 17 June 2011, for a £30,000 transfer fee. His first goal for Grimsby came 11 games into the 2011–12 season against Wrexham, a through ball from Craig Disley firing a low shot past Chris Maxwell. The following week he scored 4 goals against his former club Alfreton on 1 October 2011, scoring the equaliser on 57 minutes finishing from close range. His second came 3 minutes later when Duffy fed Hearn a ball over the top to shoot past the keeper, the hat-trick goal came in the 70th minute, firing a shot the keeper could only assist into the net. Hearn's fourth goal of the afternoon came in the 86th minute when he took the ball past the defence and the keeper to slide home and put Grimsby 4–1 up, the game finished a 5–2 victory to the Mariners. Two games later on 11 October 2011, Hearn scored his 2nd hat-trick of the campaign in a 5–2 win over Barrow, he scored the first after racing clear of the defence to shoot underneath the keeper, after Barrow equalised, Hearn scored his second in first-half stoppage time, a one-two with Craig Disley put him in on goal holding off his marker, he side-footed home this time with his left-foot, his third came on 75 minutes, muscling his way through to turn in the box and beat Hurst with a low shot from six yards.

Hearn helped Grimsby to a 5–0 rout over Ashington in the fourth qualifying round of the FA Cup on 29 October 2011, Coulson and Duffy combined on 38 minutes to put Hearn through, who skipped round Dryden the keeper, before his first shot effort was well saved by Dryden, but he made no mistake at the second attempt; two minutes later another ball from Robert Duffy to Hearn who then muscled through the defence, scoring past Dryden from 10 yards.

On 26 November 2011, he scored two more goals in a 2–1 victory at Kettering, scoring the first on 14 minutes when Hearn read a lofted ball forward and muscled past defender Jamie Navarro before slotting past goalkeeper Aldi Haxia's goal from a tight angle, his second came when Michael Coulson whipped in a cross that wasn't cleared, Hearn unleashed a superb right-footed shot on the turn, across goal and in off the far post for his 10th league goal of the season.

Grimsby's biggest win of the season came on 29 November 2011 in a 7–0 thrashing over Stockport County, Hearn scored his third hat-trick, on 22 minutes Grimsby were 2–0 up when Jamie Green from inside the box squared to the unmarked Hearn who scored a tap-in to the bottom left corner of the goal inside the area, on 45 minutes Hearn put Grimsby 5–0 up when Anthony Elding found Hearn who struck from 10 yards out, on 58 minutes Jamie Green took a corner which was met by Charlie I'Anson providing the knockdown to Hearn who then rifled into the roof of the net from a few yards for the 6th goal.

On 17 December 2011, Hearn scored a double in the 4–3 home win against Ebbsfleet United, in the opening 2 minutes latching on to a poor back pass, racing away and firing past their keeper, he scored the third goal for Grimsby on 13 minutes, Luke McCarthy's mistake, slipping a back pass through to Hearn who was composed and clinical as he shot beyond the keeper from inside the penalty area for 3–0. On 26 December 2011, Hearn scored the crucial winning goal to put Grimsby 2–1 up in the derby against Lincoln City, Manny Panther combined with Craig Disley who then flicked it over the defence for Hearn to accelerate into the box, keeping his composure to fire under Farman and into the left corner of the goal.

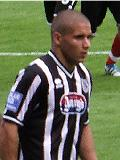
Hearn playing for Grimsby Town.

The following calendar year he helped Grimsby do the double in a 3–1 home victory over rivals Lincoln City scoring the opening goal on 25 minutes, Conor Townsend beating the opposing defenders to curl in a cross from the left through to Hearn who lashed it home from eight yards. The following Saturday on 8 January 2012 he scored twice against former club Alfreton, Townsend with a perfect long ball to Hearn who cut off the defence to shoot Grimsby ahead on 11 minutes with a low effort from the edge of the penalty area, a quality through ball from Andi Thanoj sent Hearn clear, side-stepping the on rushing home keeper to steer the ball into an empty net from 12 yards for 3–1 on 40 minutes, Grimsby ended up winning 5–2 thus doing the double over Alfreton.

After racking up 25 goals in all competitions by January, Hearn was reported to be amidst much transfer speculation with numerous clubs reportedly scouting; on 15 January 2012 Premier League side Chelsea and Football League Championship club Reading amongst other clubs began watching the forward. Peterborough United Director of Football Barry Fry confirmed the club's interest in bringing Hearn to London Road. On 28 January 2012, Grimsby released a club statement intending there desire to keep hold of Hearn at all costs.

Hearn's 24th goal of the season came on 17 February 2012, he scored the crucial winning goal in the 2–1 win at Southport, Anthony Church slotting the ball to Hearn whose first strike was parried, but the ball came back to him and he placed the ball into the corner of the net in the 83rd minute.

On 24 April 2012 Hearn was voted "Supporters Player of the Year" award, also taking five other minor awards. He finished the season with 29 goals in 51 appearances.

==== 2012–13 ====
During pre-season, Hearn picked up a calf and achilles problem on his right leg, thus ended up missing Grimsby's following pre-season games against Hull City, Scunthorpe United and Lincoln City. Hearn appeared to be on the road to recovery, on 14 August 2012 in the 2–1 defeat at Stockport County, he came on as a 58th-minute substitute. However, on 17 August 2012, he injured his left leg in training, tests revealed an Achilles tendon rupture and he would be out for several months.

==== 2013–14 ====
Hearn began the 2013–14 season ready and fit and played in the club's opening 1–1 draw with Aldershot Town. Three days later he scored the first goal in the club's 2–1 win against Gateshead. On 21 March 2014, Hearn had his contract cancelled by mutual consent after he asked to leave the club following a series of injury issues that had limited his season to 15 appearances in all competitions. Manager Paul Hurst said: "It is really unfortunate for Liam and we would like to wish him well for the future". Hurst went on to add that: "Hearn would be welcome to return to the club in the future".

=== Mansfield Town ===
On 9 June 2014 Hearn signed for Mansfield Town on a one-year contract, having spent three months training with the League Two side.

=== Lincoln City ===
Hearn joined Conference Premier side Lincoln City on a one-year contract on 20 May 2015, after turning down a new deal with Mansfield. He made his debut for Lincoln by coming on as a 69th minute substitute at home against Cheltenham Town and scored the equaliser in a 1–1 draw after heading in an Alan Power corner.

Hearn fell out of contention at The Imps following a spat with manager Chris Moyses, thus led to loans with both Barrow and Harrogate Town. Hearn was released by The Imps in May 2016.

=== Return to Non-League ===
On 23 May 2016, Hearn signed for Ilkeston. On 12 August he re-signed for Alfreton Town following Ilkeston's suspension from the Northern Premier Division.

In May 2017, Hearn signed a contract with Basford United. He scored the second goal in the 23rd minute in Basford's 5–0 title clinching victory over Market Drayton on 19 April 2018 at Greenfields Sports Ground, seeing Basford promoted into Northern Premier League Premier Division. Hearn scored a hat-trick in the 5–1 victory over Dunkirk in Nottinghamshire Senior Cup Final on 9 May 2018.

Hearn won the EVO-STIK League South Player of the Year and EVO-STIK NPL Show Fans' Player of the Year, he was also top scorer in the league with 39 league goals winning the golden boot award.

On 17 January 2020, Hearn was announced as signing a one-month loan deal with Southern League Premier Division Central side Tamworth. Hearn made his debut for Tamworth on 21 January 2020, coming on as a 55th minute substitute for Dan Creaney in a 6–2 victory over Solihull Moors in a Birmingham Senior Cup quarter final fixture. Liam made his Southern League Premier Division Central debut on 25 January 2020, as Tamworth were defeated 4–2 away at Peterborough Sports. Liam started his first game for Tamworth on 8 February 2020, away at Redditch United, and scored his first goal in a 2–0 victory.

In March 2020 he returned to Hucknall Town.

== International career ==
Hearn was selected and called up to the England C team in 2009, and went on to earn one cap.

== Coaching career ==
During the 2016-17 season whilst playing for Alfreton Town, Hearn was appointed pathway academy coach in their partnership with Notts County, he had previously worked as an academy coach for Ilkeston.

Hearn accepted the role of full-time Head Lead Community coach at Basford United in the Northern Premier League in May 2018. He took over as interim first team manager following the departure of Martin Carruthers.

In 2019 he returned to Mansfield Town as a youth development coach.

In 2020, he joined Derby County as a youth development phase coach.

In January 2022, Hearn returned to Basford as assistant manager before departing at the end of the 2021–22 season. In January 2023, Hearn joined Sheffield United as a striker coach for the clubs youth academy.

== Personal life ==
Hearn used to play for The Scots' Grey pub in his hometown of Bulwell where he scored 67 goals in the 2007–08 season, (now closed) which was featured in a television programme entitled "The Ten Hardest Pubs in Britain."

Prior to becoming a professional footballer with Grimsby Town, Hearn was a full-time roofer.

== Career statistics ==
As of match played 10 February 2020

Appearances and goals by club, season and competition
Club	Season	League			FA Cup		League Cup		Other		Total	
Club	Season	Division	Apps	Goals	Apps	Goals	Apps	Goals	Apps	Goals	Apps	Goals
Alfreton Town	2008–09	Conference North	27	18	—		—		4 (Note: Two appearances and one goal in FA Trophy, two appearances in Conference North play-offs)	1	31	19
Alfreton Town	2009–10	Conference North	35	18	3	2	—		3 (Note: Appearances in Conference North play-offs)	1	41	21
Alfreton Town	2010–11	Conference North	32	29	2	1	—		4 (Note: Appearances in FA Trophy)	1	38	31
Alfreton Town	Total		94	65	5	3	—		11	3	110	71
Grimsby Town	2011–12	Conference Premier	42	27	5	2	—		4	0	51	29
Grimsby Town	2012–13	Conference Premier	5	1	0	0	—		2 (Note: Appearances in Conference Premier play-offs)	0	7	1
Grimsby Town	2013–14	Conference Premier	14	5	2	0	—		0	0	16	5
Grimsby Town	Total		61	33	7	2	—		6	0	74	35
Mansfield Town	2014–15	League Two	3	0	0	0	1	0	0	0	4	0
Lincoln City	2015–16	National League	20	10	1	1	—		0	0	21	11
Barrow (loan)	2015–16	National League	1	0	0	0	—		0	0	1	0
Harrogate Town (loan)	2015–16	National League North	1	0	0	0	—		0	0	1	0
Ilkeston	2016–17	Northern Premier League Premier Division	1	0	0	0	—		0	0	1	0
Alfreton Town	2016–17	National League North	27	11	0	0	—		0	0	27	11
Basford United	2016–17	Northern Premier League Division One South	—		—		—		—		—	
Basford United	2018–19	Northern Premier League Premier Division	—		—		—		—		—	
Basford United	2019–20	Northern Premier League Premier Division	5	0	0	0	—		2	0	7	0
Tamworth (loan)	2019–20	Southern League Premier Division Central	4	1	0	0	—		1 (Note: One appearance in Birmingham Senior Cup)	0	5	1
Career total			214	118	13	6	1	0	20	3	248	127

== Honours ==
Alfreton Town

- Conference North: 2010–11

Basford United

- Northern Premier League Division One South: 2017–18
- Nottinghamshire Senior Cup: 2017–18

Individual

- Conference North Player of the Month: December 2008, April 2011
- Grimsby Town Player of the Year: 2011–12
- Conference Premier Team of the Year: 2011–12
- Northern Premier League Division One South Player of the Year: 2017–18
- Northern Premier League Division One South Golden Boot: 2017–18
