= Martin Riley (footballer) =

English association football player (born 1986)

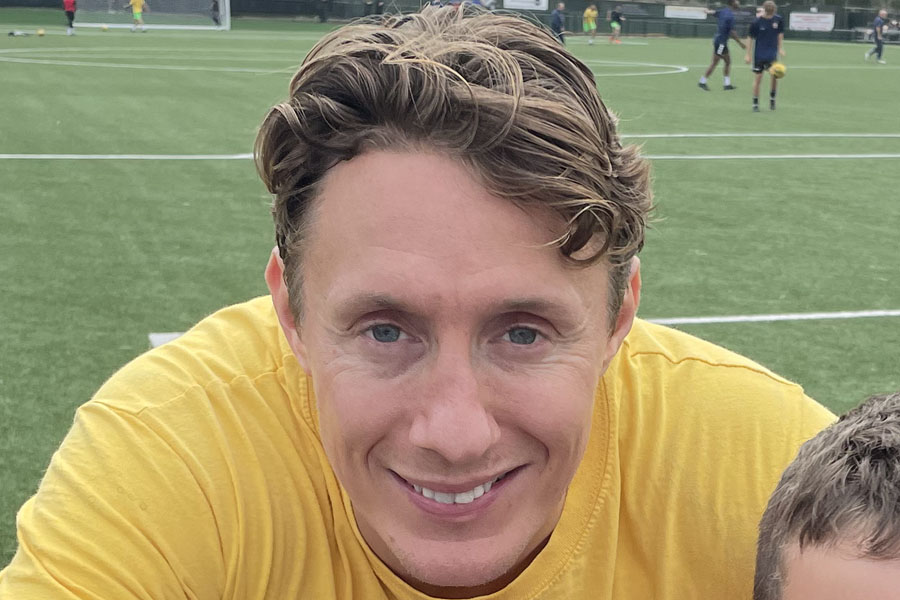
- Riley in October 2021

Personal information
- Full name: Martin James Riley
- Date of birth: 5 December 1986 (age 39)
- Place of birth: Wolverhampton, England
- Height: 6 ft 2 in (1.88 m)
- Position: Defender

Youth career
- 2002–2005: Wolverhampton Wanderers

Senior career*
Years	Team	Apps	(Gls)
2005–2007	Wolverhampton Wanderers	0	(0)
2008	Shrewsbury Town	0	(0)
2008–2010	Kidderminster Harriers	68	(4)
2010–2011	Cheltenham Town	26	(0)
2011–2012	Mansfield Town	28	(1)
2012–2013	Wrexham	34	(0)
2013–2015	Mansfield Town	64	(1)
2015–2016	Tranmere Rovers	16	(0)
2016–2017	Wrexham	30	(0)
2017–2018	FC Halifax Town	3	(0)
2018–2019	Alfreton Town	24	(0)
2019–2020	Hereford	12	(0)
2020–2021	Stourbridge	6	(0)
2021	Tamworth	8	(0)
2021–2022	Hednesford Town	?	(?)
2022–2023	Stratford Town	?	(?)
2023	Redditch United	?	(?)
2023–2024	Halesowen Town	?	(?)

International career
2009	England C	1	(0)
- * Club domestic league appearances and goals as of 20:00, 26 June 2022 (UTC)

Martin James Riley (born 5 December 1986) is an English retired footballer who played as a defender.

== Playing career ==
=== Wolverhampton Wanderers ===
Riley began his career at the age of thirteen with his home-town club Wolverhampton Wanderers. In March 2005, he signed a professional contract with the club but was released in December 2007 without making a single first-team appearance.

=== Shrewsbury Town ===
Riley had a short spell with Shrewsbury Town in 2008, but once again didn't feature in the first team.

=== Kidderminster Harriers ===
He joined Kidderminster Harriers in the Conference National division in the summer of 2008 where he spent two seasons, he often linked up with fellow centre back Mark Creighton with whom nothing was won trophy wise at Aggborough.

=== Cheltenham Town ===
Riley was signed by Cheltenham Town in the summer of 2010. He made his debut for the club on 7 August against Gillingham. On 9 May 2011, Riley was released from Cheltenham after his contract expired.

=== Mansfield Town ===
However, on 14 July 2011 Riley signed for Mansfield Town. Riley played 33 times for Mansfield Town scoring once, he also played in the Conference Play-off semi-finals against York City which they lost 2–1 on aggregate.

=== Wrexham ===
On 16 July 2012 he signed for Wrexham. This was after Wrexham sold star striker Jake Speight went the opposite way to Mansfield. At The Racecourse Ground Riley would be reunited with former defensive partner from his Aggborough days Mark Creighton, although after just 3 games Creighton suffered a season-ending injury. Riley made his debut in a Conference National game against Woking, Wrexham won 3–1. In March 2013 Riley won his first honour by winning the FA Trophy with Wrexham, beating Grimsby Town on penalties at Wembley.

=== Return to Mansfield ===
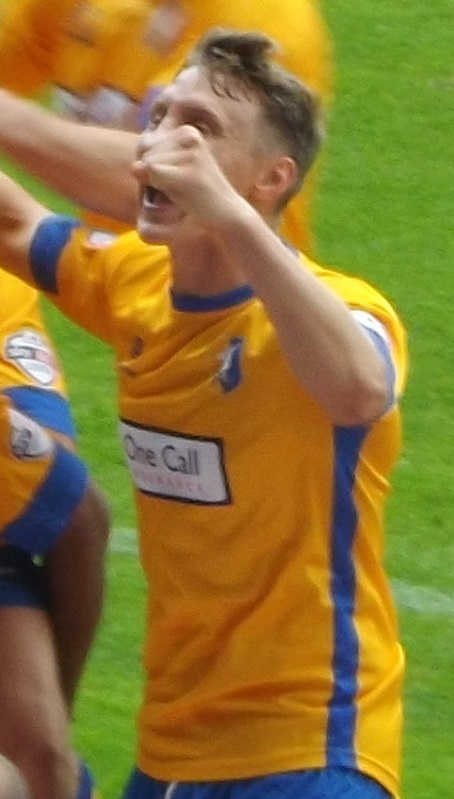
Riley playing for Mansfield Town in August 2013.

On 3 June 2013, Riley left Wrexham, returning to former club Mansfield Town on a free transfer. He was released by Mansfield at the end of the 2014–15 season.

=== Tranmere Rovers ===
Following his release from Mansfield Town, Riley signed with Tranmere Rovers on 10 June 2015, joining them on 1 July 2015.

=== Return to Wrexham ===
On 25 May 2016, Riley returned to Wrexham from Tramere. He played 30 games in the 2016–17 season, and was named Wrexham A.F.C. Player of the Year, however despite this he was released at the end of the season.

=== FC Halifax Town ===
On 24 May 2016, Riley signed a one-year deal at FC Halifax Town, becoming their first signing since winning promotion to the National League.

=== Alfreton Town ===
In July 2018, Riley joined National League North side Alfreton Town on a one-year deal.

=== Hereford ===
On 30 May 2019, he joined Hereford.

=== Stourbridge ===
On 21 August 2020, following his departure from Hereford, Riley signed for Southern League Premier Central side Stourbridge on contract terms.

Riley made his debut for Stourbridge on 22 September 2020, in an FA Cup first round fixture at away to Tamworth. Riley was introduced on the 88th minute for Darryl Knights. The game finishing 3-3, and Tamworth went on to won the tie 5–4 on penalties.

=== Tamworth ===
On 17 September 2021, Riley signed for Southern League Premier Central rivals Tamworth. The following day Riley was named as an unused substitute in an FA Cup 2nd qualifying round 5–0 away victory over Belper Town. He did make his debut in the next round of the FA Cup on 2 October 2021, as Tamworth defeated Leiston 3–1 away from home, with Riley coming on as an 83rd-minute substitute for Jack Thomas.

Riley made his Southern League Premier Central debut for Tamworth on 9 October 2021, when he was called on as a 6th-minute substitute for injured former Stourbridge teammate Jordaan Brown, and helped the club to a 2–1 victory, with both goals coming from Dan Creaney in injury time.

=== Hednesford Town ===
On 3 December 2021, Riley signed for Southern League Premier Central side Hednesford Town.

Riley confirmed on 29 May 2022 that he would be retiring following the conclusion of the 2021–22 season. However, on 13 June 2022 it was confirmed that Riley had a change of heart and agreed a deal to remain with Hednesford Town, and play for the club for the 2022–23 season.

== Career statistics ==
As of match played 23 April 2022

Appearances and goals by club, season and competition
Club	Season	League			FA Cup		League Cup		Other		Total	
Club	Season	Division	Apps	Goals	Apps	Goals	Apps	Goals	Apps	Goals	Apps	Goals
Kidderminster Harriers	2008–09	Conference Premier	26	3	3	0	—		1 (Note: Appearances in the FA Trophy)	0	30	3
Kidderminster Harriers	2009–10	Conference Premier	43	1	0	0	—		0	0	43	1
Kidderminster Harriers	Total		69	4	3	0	0	0	1	0	73	4
Cheltenham Town	2010–11	League Two	26	0	2	0	1	0	0	0	29	0
Mansfield Town	2011–12	Conference Premier	28	1	2	0	—		2 (Note: Appearances in the Conference Premier play-offs)	0	32	1
Wrexham	2012–13	Conference Premier	34	0	0	0	—		10 (Note: Seven appearances in the FA Trophy and three in the Conference Premier play-offs)	0	44	0
Mansfield Town	2013–14	League Two	31	1	2	0	0	0	1 (Note: Appearances in the Football League Trophy)	0	34	1
Mansfield Town	2014–15	League Two	33	0	3	0	1	0	1	0	38	0
Mansfield Town	Total		64	1	5	0	1	0	2	0	72	1
Tranmere Rovers	2015–16	National League	16	0	2	0	—		0	0	18	0
Wrexham	2016–17	National League	30	0	1	0	—		1	0	32	0
FC Halifax Town	2017–18	National League	3	0	0	0	—		0	0	3	0
Alfreton Town	2018–19	National League North	24	0	2	0	—		0	0	26	0
Hereford	2019–20	National League North	12	0	0	0	—		0	0	12	0
Stourbridge	2020–21	Southern League Premier Division Central	6	0	1	0	—		0	0	7	0
Tamworth	2021–22	Southern League Premier Division Central	8	0	3	0	—		2 (Note: Two appearances in FA Trophy)	0	13	0
Hednesford Town	2021–22	Southern League Premier Division Central	10	0	0	0	—		1 (Note: Appearance(s) in Birmingham Senior Cup)	0	11	0
Hednesford Town	2022–23	Southern League Premier Division Central	0	0	0	0	—		0	0	0	0
Career total			330	6	21	0	2	0	19	0	372	6

== Honours ==
Wrexham

- FA Trophy: 2012–13

Alfreton Town

- Derbyshire Senior Cup: 2018–19
