= Korrey Henry =

English footballer

Personal information
- Full name: Korrey Emmeka Henry
- Date of birth: 28 November 1999 (age 26)
- Place of birth: Lewisham, England
- Height: 1.78 m (5 ft 10 in)
- Position: Forward

Team information
- Current team: Kingstonian

Youth career
- –2018: West Ham United

Senior career*
Years	Team	Apps	(Gls)
2018–2019	Yeovil Town	4	(0)
2018	→ Poole Town (loan)	2	(3)
2019	Braintree Town	15	(5)
2019	Bromley	3	(0)
2019	→ Welling United (loan)	3	(4)
2019–2020	Welling United	12	(1)
2020–2021	Dulwich Hamlet	5	(0)
2021	Braintree Town	0	(0)
2021	Leatherhead	2	(0)
2021–2022	Merstham	28	(14)
2022–	Kingstonian	0	(0)
- * Club domestic league appearances and goals as of 10:29, 13 July 2022 (UTC)

Korrey Emmeka Henry (born 28 November 1999) is an English semi-professional footballer who plays as a forward for Kingstonian.

== Career ==
On 22 July 2018, following his release from West Ham United, Henry signed for League Two side Yeovil Town on a one-year contract. On 11 August 2018, Henry made his English Football League debut for Yeovil as a substitute in their 2–2 draw against Mansfield Town.

On 14 September 2018, Henry joined Southern League Premier Division South club Poole Town on an initial one-month loan deal.

On 1 February 2019, Henry had his contract with Yeovil terminated by mutual consent having only made five appearances for the club. Henry subsequently signed for National League side Braintree Town until the end of the season.

In June 2019 he signed for Bromley. He moved on loan to Welling United for one month in November 2019, scoring 4 goals in a 6–2 league win against former club Braintree Town on 16 November 2019. He returned to Bromley and made one appearance on 30 November 2019, before Welling confirmed on 13 December 2019, that Henry had joined the club on a permanent basis.

In September 2020, Henry signed for fellow National League South side Dulwich Hamlet.

Following a disruptive 2020–21 campaign due to the COVID-19 pandemic, in which he featured only five times for Dulwich, Henry opted to return to Braintree Town ahead of the 2021–22 season. Failing to make an appearance back at Braintree, Henry joined Leatherhead in September 2021. He moved on to league rivals Merstham on 13 October 2021. In July 2022, Henry joined Kingstonian.

== Career statistics ==
As of end of 2021–22 season

Appearances and goals by club, season and competition
Club	Season	League			FA Cup		EFL Cup		Other		Total	
Club	Season	Division	Apps	Goals	Apps	Goals	Apps	Goals	Apps	Goals	Apps	Goals
Yeovil Town	2018–19	League Two	4	0	0	0	1	0	0	0	5	0
Poole Town (loan)	2018–19	Southern League Premier Division South	2	3	—		—		1 (Note: Appearance(s) in the Southern League Cup)	1	3	4
Braintree Town	2018–19	National League	15	5	—		—		—		15	5
Bromley	2019–20	National League	3	0	0	0	—		0	0	3	0
Welling United (loan)	2019–20	National League South	3	4	—		—		0	0	3	4
Welling United	2019–20	National League South	12	1	—		—		1 (Note: Appearance(s) in the FA Trophy)	0	13	1
Dulwich Hamlet	2020–21	National League South	5	0	3	1	—		2	0	10	1
Braintree Town	2021–22	National League South	0	0	—		—		0	0	0	0
Leatherhead	2021–22	Isthmian League Premier Division	2	0	3	0	—		0	0	5	0
Merstham	2021–22	Isthmian League Premier Division	28	14	—		—		2 (Note: Appearance(s) in Surrey Senior Cup)	0	30	14
Career total			74	27	6	1	1	0	6	1	87	29
