= Anthony Elding =

English footballer (born 1982)

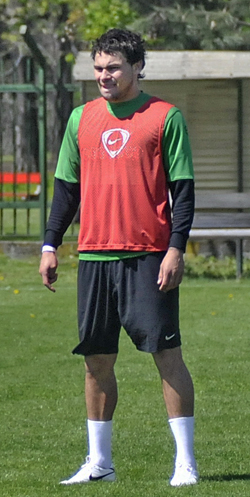
- Elding with Ferencváros in 2010

Personal information
- Full name: Anthony Elding
- Date of birth: 16 April 1982 (age 44)
- Place of birth: Boston, Lincolnshire
- Position: Striker

Youth career
- 1993–1994: Nottingham Forest
- 1994–1995: Lincoln City
- 1996–1997: Grimsby Town
- 1998–2001: Boston United

Senior career*
Years	Team	Apps	(Gls)
2001–2003	Boston United	37	(6)
2001–2002	→ Bedford Town (loan)	4	(1)
2002–2003	→ Gainsborough Trinity (loan)	1	(0)
2003–2006	Stevenage Borough	109	(50)
2006	Kettering Town	15	(4)
2006–2007	Boston United	19	(5)
2007–2008	Stockport County	45	(24)
2008	Leeds United	9	(1)
2008–2010	Crewe Alexandra	26	(1)
2009	→ Lincoln City (loan)	15	(3)
2009	→ Kettering Town (loan)	8	(3)
2010	Ferencváros	15	(8)
2010–2011	Rochdale	17	(3)
2011	→ Stockport County (loan)	21	(3)
2011–2013	Grimsby Town	59	(18)
2012–2013	→ Preston North End (loan)	5	(0)
2013	Sligo Rovers	24	(19)
2014	Cork City	2	(2)
2014–2015	Ballinamallard United	17	(3)
2015	Derry City	9	(2)
2015–2016	Sligo Rovers	8	(2)
Total		469	(157)

International career
2003–2005	England C	6	(2)

Managerial career
- 2010: Ferencvárosi TC (coach)
- 2023: Sligo Rovers (coach)
- 2025: Athlone Town (assistant manager)
- * Club domestic league appearances and goals

Anthony Elding (born 16 April 1982) is an English former professional footballer. Since retiring, Elding has held first-team coaching positions at Ferencvárosi TC, Sligo Rovers as coach, also assistant manager at Athlone Town, in League of Ireland Premier Division and League of Ireland First Division respectively.

Elding was a striker and played from 2001 until 2016. with a host of different clubs at youth level before signing for his hometown team Boston United in 2001. After two seasons with United that saw loan spells with Bedford Town and Gainsborough Trinity he moved on to Stevenage Borough where he scored 50 league goals in 106 league appearances. In 2006, he had a brief spell with Kettering Town before re-signing with Boston. He later moved on to Stockport County before joining Leeds United in 2008. His stay at Elland Road was brief and he moved on to Crewe Alexandra. Whilst with Crewe he was vice captain. He spent time on loan at Lincoln City and back with Kettering.

In the summer of 2010 he joined Hungarian Premier League side Ferencváros before returning to England to sign with Rochdale. Whilst with Dale he spent time back on loan with Stockport County before joining Grimsby Town in July 2010. Elding played one and a half seasons with The Mariners where he was vice captain but following a loan spell with Preston North End he left by mutual consent in February 2013. He spent the next three years in Ireland playing with Sligo Rovers, Cork City, Ballinamallard United and Derry City. Between 2003 and 2005 Elding was capped six times by the England C team.

== Club career ==
=== Boston United ===
Elding was born in Boston, Lincolnshire. Having been a member of Nottingham Forest's Centre of Excellence and enjoying run-outs with the academy teams at Lincoln City and Grimsby Town, Elding joined hometown club Boston United's academy at the end of the 1998–99 season. Elding had his first taste of first team football as an unused substitute in the 1–1 Southern Football League draw at Atherstone United on 11 December 1999 but his senior debut did not come until 16 September 2000 when he appeared as a substitute for the final three minutes of the 2–1 home Football Conference victory over Morecambe. Four days later he marked his first start for the club with a goal after just 32 seconds in the 5–1 home defeat to Nuneaton Borough in the Conference League Cup, and he remained a regular presence around the first team squad for the remainder of the season.

In September 2001, to gain experience, he joined Bedford Town on loan making a goalscoring debut in the 1–1 away draw with Heybridge Swifts on 18 September 2001. Returning to Boston, he scored his first Conference goal for the club in the 1–1 draw at Margate on 1 December 2001 and three further goals in his next two games saw him attract the attention of Premier League scouts. In January 2002, he trialled with Tottenham Hotspur, appearing for the reserves in their 1–0 defeat at Nottingham Forest's reserves on 14 January 2002. The following week he trialled with Bolton Wanderers scoring twice for the reserves in their 2–1 home victory over Aston Villa's reserves on 22 January 2002. However, no move materialised and Elding remained with Boston, completing the season with six league goals from twelve starts at the Pilgrims secured the Football Conference title and promotion to the Football League.

Elding made his Football League debut in Boston's inaugural game at home to AFC Bournemouth on 10 August 2002 but was stretchered off with an ankle injury. Returning to fitness he made only sporadic appearances for the first team and in February 2003 he joined Gainsborough Trinity on loan, debuting in the 1–0 home defeat to Gateshead on 8 February 2003. However, his loan was cut short as he returned to York Street to complete a permanent move to Stevenage Borough.

He rejoined Boston in 2006 for his second spell at the club signing from Kettering Town, who he had previously joined for a fee of £40,000. He also had a successful spell at Stevenage Borough.

=== Stevenage Boro ===
Elding was at his most prolific during his time with Stevenage and was a favourite of the fans. He was put on the transfer list as a result of an argument with manager Graham Westley.

=== Stockport County ===
Elding signed for an undisclosed five figure sum for fellow League Two team Stockport County at the start of 2007.

Elding made his debut in Stockport County's 2–0 win over his former-team Boston United at Edgeley Park. This was the first win of the famous Football League record, winning nine consecutive games without conceding a goal with Elding contributing by scoring seven goals during this. By the end of the season he had scored 11 league goals in 20 league games, which put him top of the County goalscoring charts for the season, his efforts were also recognised by the club as he became the first player to win back to back player of the month awards during the season.

At the start of the 2007–08 season, Stockport were inconsistent and it took until the third game for Elding to open his account, but six more were to follow in league and cup. However, on 16 October 2007, Elding was suspended by Stockport, for a potential breach of contract, and potential breach of Football League rule 66.4 which prevents a player from approaching another club with a view to instigating a move. However, the suspension was lifted on 19 October, with Elding stating: "I know why the club took the action they did, and I'm now looking forward to proving to everyone that I'm committed to County".

Elding scored a few more before a lean spell left him on the sidelines, but he managed to score five goals in five league games between the end of December and the end of January, which put him fifth in the League Two goalscoring charts. Two bids were rejected by Stockport from Hartlepool United, before a bid from Leeds United was accepted.

During his 13-month period at County he scored 26 goals in 52 games in all competitions.

=== Leeds United ===
On 31 January 2008, Leeds United had an offer accepted by Stockport County for an undisclosed amount for Elding with a view to a permanent transfer. He travelled to the club's Thorp Arch training ground and completed the deal the same day. The deal was confirmed just before the transfer deadline.

He scored his first competitive goal for Leeds in the 2–1 defeat to Cheltenham Town after coming on as a second half sub for Tresor Kandol. He then said to the media that his goals could rebolster Leeds' playoff hopes. Elding never got a regular run of games at Leeds, scoring just one goal, he was deemed surplus to requirements by Gary McAllister and sold to Crewe.

=== Crewe Alexandra ===
He signed for Crewe Alexandra in July 2008 for £160,000. Elding made his debut as a substitute for Shaun Miller against Brighton in the opening fixture on 9 August 2008. He made his first start against Barnsley in the League cup First Round and scored his first goal during this game on 12 August 2008. Elding scored 3 in his first 5 games for Crewe but then failed to score again in another 27 appearances, finishing with 3 goals for Crewe in 32 matches, and only 1 league goal in 26 games. Elding joined Lincoln City on loan for three months in January. He came back to Crewe on the same day as teammate Michael O'Connor. Elding had stated that he would wish to return to Lincoln if he was not in the first team plans but manager Gudjon Thordarson stated otherwise, saying that he was in the first team picture. He was later told that he was free to leave Crewe. He received interest from Burton Albion, Bradford City, Gillingham, Brentford, Port Vale, Crawley Town and Altrincham.

=== Return to Kettering ===
Elding re-signed for Kettering Town on loan on 3 November 2009 after rejecting loan moves to Port Vale, Rushden & Diamonds and Darlington, and made his second Poppies debut against Wrexham the same day, scoring the first goal of the match. Elding started the FA Cup 1–1 draw against his former club Leeds United, then in the replay at Elland Road he headed in the equalising goal for 1–1 in normal time, with Leeds winning 5–1 after extra time.

=== Ferencváros ===
After Elding left Kettering Town, Craig Short called him to Ferencváros and subsequently joined the club. He scored 8 goals in 15 matches to become their top scorer for the season.

=== Rochdale ===
On 27 July 2010, Elding signed for League One promoted side Rochdale on a two–year contract. He scored his first goal for dale in the League Cup First Round at Barnsley and this helped dale progress in the cup. The game ended 1–0.

=== Return to Stockport ===
On 7 January 2011, he re-joined former club Stockport County for the rest of the season, and was given the number 9 shirt. After joining the club, Elding says joining the club as 'nice to feel wanted again'. He made his second club debut on 8 January in a 5–1 home defeat to Gillingham. In his second game back at Edgeley Park, Elding missed a penalty, but set up two in a 3–3 draw with Rotherham United. On 12 February, Elding scored his first goal since returning to County in a 2–1 win over Bury.

=== Grimsby Town ===
On 25 July 2011, Elding signed for Grimsby Town on a one–year contract with an option for an additional year. During the 2011–12 season Elding scored 12 times in 43 league appearances as he partnered Liam Hearn as the club's favoured strike force. Elding was previously linked with League One side Plymouth; but turned down the move in favour of joining Grimsby Town. In February 2012, Elding signed a new contract that would see him remain at Grimsby until the end of the 2013–14 campaign. On Transfer deadline day, speculation was made to whether Elding would leave after reports were revealed that Football League One side Preston North End were interested, however Preston boss Graham Westley commented saying that he would not be making an offer.

On 4 September 2012, it was announced that Preston had made an offer for Elding that was turned down by Grimsby, in turn Elding admitted he wanted to leave after becoming unsettled having fallen behind Andy Cook, Greg Pearson and Dayle Southwell in the forward pecking order, despite Liam Hearn being out with a lengthy injury. On 5 September 2012, Elding came off the bench to score a brace that rescued a point in a 2–2 draw with Barrow. On 24 September 2012, Elding handed in a transfer request. On 12 November 2012 having fallen out of contention in the club's first team plans Elding was told he was able to leave the club on a free transfer if he was able to find a new club.

On 15 November, Preston North End then confirmed that they had signed the striker on loan until 1 January 2013 with Elding linking up with his former boss from Stevenage Graham Westley. Elding played five league games for Preston during his loan spell, failing to score and returned to Grimsby on 1 January 2013. On 4 January 2013 Preston expressed an interest in taking Elding back on loan with a view to a permanent deal. On 7 January Grimsby manager Rob Scott said despite the interest from Preston he was struggling to get hold of the club for the deal to progress. Elding left Town on mutual consent on 8 February 2013.

=== Sligo Rovers ===
After initially being linked to Sligo Rovers, Grimsby Town stated upon Elding's release that he was moving to an unnamed League of Ireland side, but not Sligo as first thought. The following week it was announced that he would be signing a contract with Limerick but after flying to Ireland, Elding did a U-turn and joined Sligo Rovers. He made a superb start to his career with the Bit o' Red, scoring six goals in five games, including scoring his first goal on his debut. Elding was named the Airtricity/Soccer Writers Association of Ireland Player of the Month for March 2013. Anthony played UEFA Champions League Second Qualifying Round versus Molde FK while at Sligo Rovers making two appearances, both home and away legs.

=== Cork City ===
On 16 November 2013, Cork City announced that Anthony Elding had signed for City from Sligo Rovers until the end of the 2014 season. He became new manager John Caulfields second signing after taking charge, his first being Darren Murphy. He scored his first competitive goals for the club when he netted two against Waterford United in the Munster Senior Cup.

=== Ballinamallard, Derry City and return to Sligo ===
On 23 May 2014 Elding moved to Northern Ireland signing with IFA Premiership side Ballinamallard United. He later went on to feature for Derry City before returning to Sligo Rovers.

== Personal life ==
His son Owen Elding, is a professional footballer playing for Hibernian and the Republic of Ireland national team.

== Coaching career ==
Elding currently holds the UEFA 'A' qualification, after completing the UEFA B.

In 2023 Elding was appointed first team coach at League of Ireland Premier Division club Sligo Rovers.

Elding was linked with first team head coach position at League of Ireland First Division clubs Longford Town & Wexford FC season 2025 after going through the final stages of the interview process.

In 2025 Elding was appointed first team assistant manager of League of Ireland First Division club Athlone Town.

Elding has held elite academy head coach positions at Longford Town, Sligo Rovers, Mayo FC, Ballinamallard United, while supporting first team coaching at Ferencvarosi Tc.

Elding being linked with the first team head coach position at former league of Ireland club Sligo Rovers where he became a club legend after scoring the winning goal in the 2013 FAI Cup final in a dramatic 94th minute.

== Career statistics ==
Appearances and goals by club, season and competition
Club	Season	League			National cup (Note: Includes FA Cup)		League cup (Note: Includes League Cup)		Other		Total	
Club	Season	Division	Apps	Goals	Apps	Goals	Apps	Goals	Apps	Goals	Apps	Goals
Boston United	2000–01	Conference National	10	0	0	0	1	1	0	0	11	1
Boston United	2001–02	Conference National	19	6	0	0	0	0	0	0	19	6
Boston United	2002–03	League Two	8	0	1	0	0	0	1	0	10	0
Boston United	Total		37	6	1	0	1	1	1	0	40	7
Stevenage	2002–03	Conference National	13	7	0	0	0	0	0	0	13	7
Stevenage	2003–04	Conference National	35	17	2	1	0	0	1	0	38	18
Stevenage	2004–05	Conference National	44	19	1	0	0	0	1	1	46	20
Stevenage	2005–06	Conference National	17	7	3	2	0	0	1	0	21	9
Stevenage	Total		109	50	6	3	0	0	3	1	118	54
Boston United	2006–07	League Two	19	5	1	0	0	0	1	0	21	5
Stockport County	2006–07	League Two	20	11	0	0	0	0	0	0	20	11
Stockport County	2007–08	League Two	25	13	2	0	2	1	3	1	32	15
Stockport County	Total		45	24	2	0	2	1	3	1	52	26
Leeds United	2007–08	League One	9	1	0	0	0	0	0	0	9	1
Crewe Alexandra	2008–09	League One	16	1	0	0	3	2	2	0	21	3
Crewe Alexandra	2009–10	League Two	10	0	0	0	1	0	1	0	12	0
Crewe Alexandra	Total		26	1	0	0	4	2	3	0	33	3
Lincoln City (loan)	2008–09	League Two	15	3	0	0	0	0	0	0	15	3
Kettering Town (loan)	2009–10	Conference National	8	3	3	1	0	0	0	0	11	4
Ferencváros	2009–10	Nemzeti Bajnokság I	10	6	0	0	0	0	0	0	10	6
Rochdale	2010–11	League One	17	3	1	1	2	1	1	0	21	5
Stockport County (loan)	2010–11	League Two	21	3	0	0	0	0	0	0	21	3
Grimsby Town	2011–12	Conference National	43	12	4	0	0	0	3	4	50	16
Grimsby Town	2012–13	Conference National	16	2	0	0	0	0	0	0	16	2
Grimsby Town	Total		59	14	4	0	0	0	3	4	66	18
Preston North End (loan)	2012–13	League One	5	0	0	0	0	0	0	0	5	0
Sligo Rovers	2013	League of Ireland Premier Division	24	12	3	2	2	3	5	1	34	18
Cork City	2014	League of Ireland Premier Division	2	0	0	0	2	0	1	2	5	2
Ballinamallard United	2014–15	NIFL Premiership	17	3	0	0	1	1	0	0	18	4
Derry City	2015	League of Ireland Premier Division	9	2	0	0	2	0	0	0	11	2
Sligo Rovers	2015	League of Ireland Premier Division	0	0	0	0	0	0	0	0	0	0
Career total			432	136	21	7	16	9	21	9	490	161

== Honours ==
Boston United

- Southern League Premier Division: 1999–2000 (promotion to Football Conference)
- Football Conference: 2001–02 (promotion to Division Three)

Stockport County

- EFL League Two Play off 2007-08

Stockport County

- EFL League Two Player of the month February & March Respectively 2007

Leeds United

- EFL League One Play-off Runners-up: 2008

Grimsby Town

- Lincolnshire Senior Cup 2011–12, 2012–13

England C

- Four Nations Tournament 2004–05

Stevenage Borough

- Nationwide Conference Play off Runner-up 2005

Sligo Rovers

- League of Ireland Player of the month 2013

Sligo Rovers

- FAI Cup: 2013

=== Head coach ===
Manulla FC

- Mayo League: Westaro League Cup: 2016

Longford Town MU17

- League of Ireland: 2022

Sligo Rovers MU15

- League of Ireland: 2024
