= Alex Fisher =

English footballer (born 1990)

Personal information
- Full name: Alexander Anthony Fisher
- Date of birth: 30 June 1990 (age 36)
- Place of birth: Westminster, England
- Height: 6 ft 3 in (1.90 m)
- Position: Forward

Team information
- Current team: Bath City
- Number: 14

Youth career
- 1997–2007: Oxford United

Senior career*
| Years | Team | Apps | (Gls) |
| 2007–2009 | Oxford United | 14 | (2) |
| 2008 | → Brackley Town (loan) | 5 | (3) |
| 2009 | → Oxford City (loan) | 16 | (12) |
| 2010–2011 | Jerez Industrial | 21 | (11) |
| 2011–2012 | Tienen | 7 | (1) |
| 2012–2013 | RC Mechelen | 27 | (7) |
| 2013 | Heist | 2 | (0) |
| 2013–2014 | Monza | 14 | (2) |
| 2014–2015 | Mansfield Town | 14 | (1) |
| 2015 | Torquay United | 21 | (5) |
| 2016–2017 | Inverness Caledonian Thistle | 22 | (8) |
| 2017–2018 | Motherwell | 11 | (0) |
| 2018–2019 | Yeovil Town | 57 | (13) |
| 2019–2021 | Exeter City | 34 | (3) |
| 2021–2022 | Newport County | 22 | (1) |
| 2022–2024 | Yeovil Town | 54 | (10) |
| 2024 | → Oxford City (loan) | 3 | (0) |
| 2024– | Bath City | 64 | (7) |
- * Club domestic league appearances and goals as of 16:59, 13 September 2026 (UTC)

Alexander Anthony Fisher (born 30 June 1990) is an English professional footballer who plays as a forward for Southern League Premier Division South club Bath City.

== Club career ==
=== Oxford United ===
Born in London and educated at Abingdon School, Fisher played youth football with Oxford United. After impressing in the youth and reserve teams, he was promoted to the senior squad.

Fisher scored his first senior goal in January 2008 at 17 years old in a 4–0 home league win against Altrincham.

Fisher joined Southern League team Brackley Town in March 2008 on loan, scoring three goals in five starts. Another loan to Oxford City followed in early 2009, where he netted 12 goals in 16 games.

=== Europe ===
After being released by Oxford United, Fisher joined the Glenn Hoddle Academy in Spain, which aimed to offer a route back to professional football for players released by their clubs. During his time at the academy, he received coaching from Graham Rix, Dave Beasant and Nigel Spackman. In September 2010, the academy took over Spanish club Jerez Industrial in the fourth-tier Tercera División, giving Fisher the opportunity to play senior football. He went on to make 21 league appearances, scoring 11 goals, but could not prevent relegation after the club received a points deduction. By the end of the season the academy had cut ties with Jerez Industrial and relocated to the UK.

In March 2012, Fisher signed for Belgian Second Division side KVK Tienen until the end of the season. He played nine games in all competitions, scoring once, but suffered a second successive relegation after losing in the play-offs to UR La Louvière Centre.

Fisher spent the next season with K.R.C. Mechelen in the Belgian Third Division, scoring seven goals in 30 appearances in all competitions. The team finished second in the league, falling short in the promotion play-offs against A.S. Verbroedering Geel.

In July 2013, Fisher moved up a division, signing for K.S.K. Heist. He made two appearances for the club.

After just seven weeks with KSK Heist, Fisher joined Italian team A.C. Monza Brianza 1912, playing in the fourth-tier Lega Pro Seconda Divisione.

=== Mansfield Town ===
On 4 June 2014 Fisher returned to England, signing for Mansfield Town in League Two. He scored his first goal for the club in the League Cup against Sheffield United. He was released by Mansfield at the end of the 2014–15 season.

=== Torquay United ===
On 5 August 2015, Fisher signed for National League team Torquay United. Fisher scored on his debut in a 1–0 win over Macclesfield Town, and went on to score another winning goal in a 3–2 win against FC Halifax Town a week later. In December 2015 Fisher was released by the club, after requesting his contract be terminated for personal reasons.

=== Inverness Caledonian Thistle ===
On 9 January 2016, Fisher signed for Scottish Premiership club Inverness Caledonian Thistle on a deal until the end of the season, with an option for the club to extend that by another year. However, he made just three substitute appearances before chipping a bone in his ankle, ruling him out for the season. He signed a further six-month contract with the club in May 2016. In November 2016, his contract was extended to the end of the season. In total, he scored eight goals in 28 games in all competitions for the club.

=== Motherwell ===
After Inverness's relegation from the Premiership, Fisher signed a two-year contract with Motherwell in June 2017. He failed to score a goal in 19 appearances for Motherwell, and was released from his contract in January 2018.

=== Yeovil Town ===
Fisher signed for EFL League Two side Yeovil Town on 26 January 2018, making his debut in the FA Cup against Manchester United. At the end of the 2018–19 season, Fisher was released by Yeovil following the club's relegation from the Football League.

=== Exeter City ===
On 25 June 2019, Fisher signed for League Two side Exeter City. He scored his first goal for the club in November, in a 1–1 draw against Cambridge United in the first round of the FA Cup. His first league goal for the club came in December, in a 3–2 win against Northampton Town.

On 12 May 2021, it was announced that Fisher would leave Exeter at the end of the season, following the expiry of his contract.

=== Newport County ===
On 14 August 2021, Fisher signed for League Two side Newport County on a one-year contract. He made his debut for Newport on the same day as a second-half substitute in a 2–1 defeat against Mansfield Town. Fisher scored his first goal for Newport in a 1–0 win over Tranmere Rovers on 21 August 2021. He was released by Newport County at the end of the 2021–22 season.

=== Yeovil Town ===
On 14 July 2022, Fisher returned to National League club Yeovil Town on a two-year deal. He suffered a double leg break in a collision with Southend United's goalkeeper during their match at Huish Park on 1 April 2023.

On 5 January 2024, Fisher rejoined National League side Oxford City on a one-month loan deal. At the end of the 2023–24 season, Fisher was released by Yeovil following the club's promotion from the National League South.

=== Bath City ===
On 5 August 2024, Fisher signed for National League South club Bath City after a successful trial period.

Fisher announced his retirement at the end of the 2025–26 season, however he subsequently resigned for Bath City following their relegation.

== Career statistics ==
As of match played 12 September 2026

Appearances and goals by club, season and competition
| Club | Season | League | | | National Cup | | League Cup | | Other | | Total | |
| Club | Season | Division | Apps | Goals | Apps | Goals | Apps | Goals | Apps | Goals | Apps | Goals |
|---|---|---|---|---|---|---|---|---|---|---|---|---|
| Oxford United | 2006–07 | Conference Premier | 0 | 0 | 1 | 0 | — | | 0 | 0 | 1 | 0 |
| Oxford United | 2007–08 | Conference Premier | 10 | 1 | 2 | 0 | — | | 0 | 0 | 12 | 1 |
| Oxford United | 2008–09 | Conference Premier | 4 | 1 | 1 | 1 | — | | 0 | 0 | 5 | 2 |
| Oxford United | Total | | 14 | 2 | 4 | 1 | — | | 0 | 0 | 18 | 3 |
| Brackley Town (loan) | 2007–08 | Southern League Premier Division | 5 | 3 | 0 | 0 | — | | 0 | 0 | 5 | 3 |
| Oxford City (loan) | 2008–09 | Southern League Premier Division | 16 | 12 | 0 | 0 | — | | 0 | 0 | 16 | 12 |
| Jerez Industrial | 2010–11 | Tercera División | 21 | 11 | 0 | 0 | — | | 0 | 0 | 21 | 11 |
| Tienen | 2011–12 | Belgian Second Division | 7 | 1 | 0 | 0 | — | | 2 (Note: Appearances in Second Division relegation play-offs) | 0 | 9 | 1 |
| Racing Mechelen | 2012–13 | Belgian Third Division A | 27 | 7 | 0 | 0 | — | | 3 (Note: Appearances in Third Division play-offs) | 0 | 30 | 7 |
| Heist | 2013–14 | Belgian Second Division | 2 | 0 | 0 | 0 | — | | — | | 2 | 0 |
| Monza | 2013–14 | Lega Pro Seconda Divisione | 14 | 2 | 0 | 0 | — | | 4 (Note: Appearances in Coppa Italia Lega Pro) | 1 | 18 | 3 |
| Mansfield Town | 2014–15 | League Two | 14 | 1 | 0 | 0 | 1 | 1 | 1 (Note: Appearances in EFL Trophy) | 0 | 16 | 2 |
| Torquay United | 2015–16 | National League | 21 | 5 | 1 | 0 | — | | 1 (Note: Appearances in FA Trophy) | 0 | 23 | 5 |
| Inverness Caledonian Thistle | 2015–16 | Scottish Premiership | 1 | 0 | 2 | 0 | 0 | 0 | 0 | 0 | 3 | 0 |
| Inverness Caledonian Thistle | 2016–17 | Scottish Premiership | 21 | 8 | 0 | 0 | 4 | 0 | — | | 25 | 8 |
| Inverness Caledonian Thistle | Total | | 22 | 8 | 2 | 0 | 4 | 0 | 0 | 0 | 28 | 8 |
| Motherwell | 2017–18 | Scottish Premiership | 11 | 0 | 1 | 0 | 7 | 0 | — | | 19 | 0 |
| Yeovil Town | 2017–18 | League Two | 17 | 6 | 1 | 0 | 0 | 0 | 1 | 0 | 19 | 6 |
| Yeovil Town | 2018–19 | League Two | 40 | 7 | 1 | 1 | 1 | 0 | 1 | 0 | 43 | 8 |
| Yeovil Town | Total | | 57 | 13 | 2 | 1 | 1 | 0 | 2 | 0 | 62 | 14 |
| Exeter City | 2019–20 | League Two | 16 | 1 | 3 | 2 | 1 | 0 | 6 (Note: Four appearances in Football League Trophy; two appearances in League Two play-offs) | 0 | 26 | 3 |
| Exeter City | 2020–21 | League Two | 18 | 2 | 0 | 0 | 0 | 0 | 2 | 0 | 20 | 2 |
| Exeter City | Total | | 34 | 3 | 3 | 2 | 1 | 0 | 8 | 0 | 46 | 5 |
| Newport County | 2021–22 | League Two | 22 | 1 | 1 | 0 | 0 | 0 | 2 | 1 | 25 | 2 |
| Yeovil Town | 2022–23 | National League | 38 | 5 | 2 | 0 | — | | 1 | 0 | 41 | 5 |
| Yeovil Town | 2023–24 | National League South | 16 | 5 | 0 | 0 | — | | 0 | 0 | 16 | 5 |
| Yeovil Town | Total | | 54 | 10 | 2 | 0 | — | | 1 | 0 | 57 | 10 |
| Oxford City (loan) | 2023–24 | National League | 3 | 0 | — | | — | | 1 (Note: Appearance in Oxfordshire Senior Cup) | 0 | 4 | 0 |
| Bath City | 2024–25 | National League South | 33 | 2 | 2 | 2 | — | | 2 (Note: One appearance in FA Trophy, one appearance in Somerset Premier Cup) | 0 | 37 | 4 |
| Bath City | 2025–26 | National League South | 27 | 5 | 1 | 0 | — | | 2 (Note: One appearance in FA Trophy, one appearance and one goal in Somerset Premier Cup) | 1 | 30 | 6 |
| Bath City | 2026–27 | Southern League Prem Div South | 4 | 0 | 1 | 0 | — | | 0 | 0 | 5 | 0 |
| Bath City | Total | | 64 | 7 | 4 | 2 | — | | 4 | 1 | 72 | 10 |
| Career total | | | 408 | 86 | 20 | 6 | 14 | 1 | 29 | 3 | 471 | 96 |

== Honours ==
Yeovil Town

- National League South: 2023–24

== See also ==
- List of Old Abingdonians
