= Sascha Studer =

Swiss footballer (born 1991)

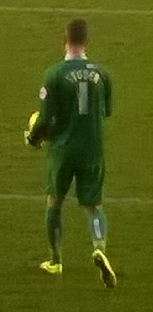

Personal information
- Full name: Sascha Studer
- Date of birth: 3 September 1991 (age 35)
- Place of birth: Kappel, Switzerland
- Height: 1.91 m (6 ft 3 in)
- Position: Goalkeeper

Youth career
- 19??–2000: FC Wangen bei Olten
- 2000–2005: FC Kappel
- 2005–2007: FC Aarau

Senior career*
Years	Team	Apps	(Gls)
2007–2012	FC Aarau	2	(0)
2007	→ FC Wohlen (loan)	0	(0)
2008	→ FC Concordia Basel (loan)	1	(0)
2011–2012	→ FC Winterthur (loan)	0	(0)
2012–2014	FC Winterthur	1	(0)
2013	→ SV Babelsberg 03 (loan)	0	(0)
2014–2015	Mansfield Town	17	(0)
Total		21	(0)

International career
2007–2008	Switzerland U-17	4	(0)
- * Club domestic league appearances and goals

Sascha Studer (born 3 September 1991) is a former Swiss professional goalkeeper.

== Career ==
Studer remains the youngest player ever to have started a game in the Swiss Super League, on 1 April 2007. He was 15 years, 6 months and 18 days old at the time. He played the entire game in Sion for his team FC Aarau, which finished in a draw (1-1).

He spent two months on loan at Challenge League club FC Wohlen as backup for Reto Felder and Romeu Leite and 2008 at FC Concordia Basel. He also spent the second half of the season on loan in the 3. Liga at the German club SV Babelsberg 03 during the 2012–13 season.

On 24 July 2014, Studer signed for Mansfield Town following a successful trial, including a clean sheet in a pre-season victory over Leeds United.

Studer announced on his social media pages on 12 July 2015 that following weeks of deliberation, he had decided to retire and pursue a career outside of football.
