= Danny Fletcher =

English footballer

Personal information
- Full name: Dan Fletcher
- Date of birth: 4 March 1997 (age 29)
- Place of birth: England
- Position: Forward

Youth career
- Teversal
- 2013–2014: Mansfield Town

Senior career*
Years	Team	Apps	(Gls)
2014–2016	Mansfield Town	1	(0)
2015	→ Carlton Town (loan)	12	(1)
2015	→ Heanor Town (loan)		
- * Club domestic league appearances and goals as of 13:36, 29 January 2016 (UTC)

Dan "Danny" Fletcher (born 4 March 1997) is an English footballer who plays as a forward.

== Career ==
Fletcher joined Mansfield Town's youth setup in 2013, after starting it out at Teversal. He was promoted to the main squad in December 2014, signing an 18-month professional deal.

Fletcher made his professional debut on 16 December, coming on as a late substitute in a 0–1 FA Cup home loss against Cambridge United. On 29 January 2016, after only two senior appearances, he was released.
