= Wiltshire Premier Shield =

- Founded
- 1926
- Current Holders
- Laverstock & Ford FC
- Country
- England
- County
- Wiltshire (Wiltshire F.A.)
- Most Successful Club
- Swindon Town (28 Wins)

The Wiltshire Premier Shield is a single county cup competition involving English football clubs based in the county of Wiltshire.

The current competition format operates with a two-leg semi-final and a single match final during the latter stages of the league season.

The most successful team in the competition's history is Swindon Town who have won the shield 27 times. Swindon Town are the only Wiltshire representative in the Football League and have often used the Wiltshire Shield to field their youths, reserves and players who are returning from injury.

The competition consists of the highest placed clubs in Wiltshire from professional to Step 5.

== Wiltshire Senior Challenge Cup ==
Season	Champions	Finalists	Notes
1886–87	Swindon Town	Trowbridge Town	
1887–88	Swindon Town	Swindon Temperance	
1888–89	Swindon Town	Swindon Temperance	
1889–90	Swindon Town	Trowbridge Town	
1890–91	Swindon Town	Swindon Town Reserves	
1891–92	Swindon Town	Swindon Town Reserves	
1892–93	Swindon Athletic	Trowbridge Town	
1895–96	Swindon Town Reserves	Trowbridge Town	Joint Holders
1896–97	Swindon Town	Trowbridge Town	
1897–98	Trowbridge Town		
1901–02	Chippenham Town	Swindon Town Reserves	
1903–04	Swindon Town	Wootton Bassett Town	
1908–09	Swindon Town	Trowbridge Town	Cup withheld
1914–19	N/A	N/A	No competition due to outbreak of World War I.
1919–20	Swindon Town	Salisbury City	
1921–22	Trowbridge Town		
1925–26	Trowbridge Town		

== Wiltshire Premier Shield winners ==
Season	Champions
1926–27	Swindon Town
1927–28	Swindon Town
1928–29	Swindon Town
1929–30	Swindon Town
1930–31	Swindon Town
1931–32	Swindon Town
1932–33	Swindon Town
1933–34	Trowbridge Town
1934–35	No competition
1935–36	No competition
1936–37	Salisbury City
1937–38	Trowbridge Town
1938–45	No competition due to outbreak of World War II.
1945–46	Trowbridge Town
1946–47	No competition
1947–48	Swindon Town
1948–49	Swindon Town
1949–50	Trowbridge Town
1950–51	Swindon Town
1951–52	Swindon Town
1952–53	Swindon Town
1953–54	Swindon Town
1954–55	Swindon Town
1955–56	Swindon Town
1956–57	Salisbury City
1957–58	Swindon Town
1958–59	Swindon Town
1959–60	Salisbury City
1960–61	Salisbury City
1961–62	Salisbury City
1962–63	No competition
1963–64	No competition
1964–65	No competition
1965–66	Chippenham Town
1966–67	Salisbury City
1967–68	Salisbury City
1968–69	Trowbridge Town
1969–70	Trowbridge Town
1970–71	Salisbury City
1971–72	Swindon Town
1972–73	Trowbridge Town
1973–74	Swindon Town
1974–75	Swindon Town
1975–76	Swindon Town
1976–77	Swindon Town
1977–78	Salisbury City
1978–79	Salisbury City
1979–80	Swindon Town
1980–81	Melksham Town
1981–82	Melksham Town
1982–83	Devizes Town
1983–84	Shield withheld
1984–85	Melksham Town
1985–86	Melksham Town
1986–87	Chippenham Town
1987–88	Swindon Town
1988–89	Chippenham Town
1989–90	Swindon Town
1990–91	Swindon Town
1991–92	Swindon Town
1992–93	Trowbridge Town
1993–94	Trowbridge Town
1994–95	Trowbridge Town
1995–96	Salisbury City
1996–97	Swindon Supermarine
1997–98	Melksham Town
1998–99	Salisbury City
1999–2000	Melksham Town
2000–01	Salisbury City
2001–02	Chippenham Town
2002–03	Salisbury City
2003–04	Chippenham Town
2004–05	Chippenham Town
2005–06	Chippenham Town
2006–07	Swindon Supermarine
2007–08	Salisbury City
2008–09	Salisbury City
2009–10	Swindon Town
2010-11	Chippenham Town
2011-12	Swindon Supermarine
2012-19	No competition
2019-20	Competition suspended due to COVID-19 pandemic.
2020-21	Competition not held due to COVID-19 pandemic.
2021–22	Swindon Supermarine
2022-23	Westbury United
2023-24	Chippenham Town
2024-25	Swindon Supermarine
2025-26	Laverstock & Ford
