= 2017–18 Grimsby Town F.C. season =

Grimsby Town
2017–18 season
- Chairman: John Fenty
- Manager: Russell Slade (sacked 11/02/18); Paul Wilkinson (left 02/03/18); Michael Jolley (from 02/03/18)
- Stadium: Blundell Park
- EFL Cup: First round (vs. Derby County)
Home colours	Away colours	Third colours

The 2017–18 season is Grimsby Town's 140th season of existence and their second consecutive season in League Two. Along with competing in League Two, the club will also participate in the FA Cup, EFL Cup and EFL Trophy.

The season covers the period from 1 July 2017 to 30 June 2018.

== Competitions ==
=== Friendlies ===
As of 2 June 2017, Grimsby Town have announced ten pre-season friendlies against Cleethorpes Town, Grimsby Borough, Stamford, Barnsley, Bideford, Tavistock, Boston United, Blackburn Rovers, Wigan Athletic and Winterton Rangers.

4 July 2017	Cleethorpes Town	2–4	Grimsby Town	Grimsby
19:00 BST	Taylor 7'; Cooper 8'	Report	Berrett 9'; Cardwell 54'; Osborne 71'; Yussuf 76'	Stadium: Bradley Football Development Centre; Attendance: 1,500

6 July 2017	Grimsby Borough	3–11	Grimsby Town	Grimsby
19:00 BST	Debnam 7', 54'; 74'	Report	Jones 2', 25' (pen.); Vernon 15', 29', 44'; Rose 32'; Dembélé 47'; Summerfield 51'; Cardwell 73', 76'; Yussuf 81'	Stadium: Bradley Football Development Centre

11 July 2017 Lincolnshire Senior Cup	Stamford	2–3	Grimsby Town	Stamford
19:30 BST	Duffy 21'; Sandy 61'	Report	Jones 29', 51' (pen.); Dembele 90+3'	Stadium: Zeeco Stadium; Attendance: 268

13 July 2017 Lincolnshire Senior Cup	Grimsby Town	4–0	Scunthorpe United	Cleethorpes
14:00 BST	Yussuf 10'; Boyce 38'; Cardwell 58'; Robinson 70'	Report		Stadium: Blundell Park

15 July 2017	Grimsby Town	2–1	Barnsley	Cleethorpes
12:30 BST	Dembele 46'; Robinson 86'	Report	Isgrove 38'	Stadium: Blundell Park

18 July 2017	Bideford	0–4	Grimsby Town	Bideford
TBC BST		Report	Rose (?), 44'; Vernon; Yussuf	Stadium: The Sports Ground

20 July 2017	Tavistock	1–7	Grimsby Town	Tavistock
19:30 BST	73' (pen.)	Report	Cardwell 5', 47'; Keeble 41'; Dembele 64'; Jones 65' (pen.), 82'; Vernon 87'	Stadium: Langsford Park

22 July 2017	Boston United	3–0	Grimsby Town	Boston
15:00 BST	Chapman 39'; Beatson 60'; Tshimanga 75'	Report		Stadium: York Street; Attendance: 677

25 July 2017	Grimsby Town	0–1	Blackburn Rovers	Cleethorpes
19:30 BST		Report	Graham 64'	Stadium: Blundell Park; Attendance: 1,692; Referee: Geoff Eltringham

27 July 2017	Winterton Rangers	0–7	Grimsby Town	Winterton
19:30 BST		Report	Rollins 13', 28'; Roberts 35', 74'; Summerfield 55'; Wright 77'; Pollock 82'	Stadium: West Street

29 July 2017	Grimsby Town	1–1	Wigan Athletic	Cleethorpes
15:00 BST	Davies 88' (pen.)	Report	Lang 6'	Stadium: Blundell Park

=== League Two ===
==== League table ====
Pos	Team	Pld	W	D	L	GF	GA	GD	Pts
16	Stevenage	46	14	13	19	60	65	−5	55
17	Cheltenham Town	46	13	12	21	67	73	−6	51
18	Grimsby Town	46	13	12	21	42	66	−24	51
19	Yeovil Town	46	12	12	22	59	75	−16	48
20	Port Vale	46	11	14	21	49	67	−18	47

Source: BBC Sport
Rules for classification: 1) Points; 2) Goal difference; 3) Number of goals scored

==== Result summary ====
Overall								Home						Away					
Pld	W	D	L	GF	GA	GD	Pts	W	D	L	GF	GA	GD	W	D	L	GF	GA	GD
46	13	12	21	42	66	−24	51	6	9	8	20	26	−6	7	3	13	22	40	−18

==== Results by matchday ====
Matchday	1	2	3	4	5	6	7	8	9	10	11	12	13	14	15	16	17	18	19	20	21	22	23	24	25	26	27	28	29	30	31	32	33	34	35	36	37	38	39	40	41	42	43	44	45	46
Ground	A	H	A	H	H	A	A	H	A	H	H	A	H	A	A	H	A	H	H	A	H	A	A	H	H	A	H	H	A	H	A	H	A	A	H	A	H	A	A	H	A	H	H	A	H	A
Result	W	L	L	L	W	L	W	W	L	D	D	W	D	W	D	D	L	L	W	W	W	D	L	D	L	L	L	L	D	L	L	D	L	L	L	L	D	L	L	D	L	W	D	W	W	W
Position	4	12	18	23	17	19	15	13	13	13	15	13	12	11	12	12	15	15	14	12	11	11	12	13	14	14	15	17	17	17	17	17	17	18	20	20	20	22	22	22	21	22	22	21	19	18

Updated to match(es) played on 28 April 2018. Source:
A = Away; H = Home; W = Win; D = Draw; L = Loss

==== Matches ====
On 21 June 2017, the league fixtures were announced.

5 August 2017 1	Chesterfield	1–3	Grimsby Town	Chesterfield
15:00 BST	Donohue (yellow card) 5'; Dennis 82' (yellow card) 86'; Evatt (red card) 85'	Report	Clarke 33'; Jones 39'; Davies 85' (pen.); Mills (yellow card) 88' (yellow-red card) 88'	Stadium: Proact Stadium; Attendance: 7,925; Referee: Eddie Ilderton

12 August 2017 2	Grimsby Town	0–2	Coventry City	Cleethorpes
15:00 BST	Dixon (yellow card) 42'; Berrett (yellow card) 88' (yellow-red card) 89'	Report	Jones (yellow card) 42'; McNulty 62'; Grimmer 75'	Stadium: Blundell Park; Attendance: 6,767; Referee: Richard Clark

19 August 2017 3	Stevenage	3–1	Grimsby Town	Stevenage
15:00 BST	Smith (yellow card) 28' (goal) 45'; Newton 37'; Kennedy 65'; Gorman (yellow card) 81'; McKee (yellow card) 90+3'	Report	Rose (yellow card) 11'; Jones (red card) 58'; Collins 81'; Dixon (yellow card) 90'	Stadium: Lamex Stadium; Attendance: 2,793; Referee: Scott Oldham

26 August 2017 4	Grimsby Town	2–3	Wycombe Wanderers	Cleethorpes
15:00 BST	Rose (yellow card) 42' (goal) 52' (pen.); Collins (yellow card) 43' (yellow-red card) 58'; Hooper 65'	Report	Akinfenwa 28', 75'; Bean (yellow card) 81'; El-Abd (yellow card) 90'	Stadium: Blundell Park; Attendance: 4,016; Referee: Mark Heywood

2 September 2017 5	Grimsby Town	1–0	Crewe Alexandra	Cleethorpes
15:00 BST	Rose 36' (yellow card) 58'; Dembélé (yellow card) 48'	Report	Cooper (yellow card) 11'; Raynes (yellow card) 33'	Stadium: Blundell Park; Attendance: 4,066; Referee: Chris Sarginson

9 September 2017 6	Mansfield Town	4–1	Grimsby Town	Mansfield
13:00	Butcher (yellow card) 22'; Angol 34' (pen.), 80' (pen.); Pearce 54'; Osborne 64' (o.g.)	Report	Jones 85' (pen.); Osborne (yellow card) 90+5'	Stadium: Field Mill; Attendance: 4,625; Referee: Paul Tierney

12 September 2017 7	Accrington Stanley	1–2	Grimsby Town	Accrington
19:45 BST	Jackson 45'; Hughes (yellow card) 65'; Wilks (yellow card) 90+2'	Report	Davies (yellow card) 12'; Jones 43'; Woolford 47'; Matt (yellow card) 57'; Dembélé (yellow card) 73'	Stadium: Crown Ground; Attendance: 1,288; Referee: Robert Jones

16 September 2017 8	Grimsby Town	2–1	Yeovil Town	Cleethorpes
15:00 BST	Collins 8'; Jones (yellow card) 26'; Vernon 71'	Report	Zoko 21'; Smith (yellow card) 40'	Stadium: Blundell Park; Attendance: 3,945; Referee: Graham Horwood

23 September 2017 9	Newport County	1–0	Grimsby Town	Newport
15:00 BST	Amond 63'	Report	Clarke (yellow card) 69'	Stadium: Rodney Parade; Attendance: 3,356; Referee: Antony Coggins

26 September 2017 10	Grimsby Town	2–2	Colchester United	Cleethorpes
19:45 BST	Hooper 7'; Jones 89' (pen.); Berrett (yellow card) 90+1'	Report	Reid 5', 59'; Comley (yellow card) 23'; Vincent-Young (yellow card) 84'; Loft (yellow card) 90+4'	Stadium: Blundell Park; Attendance: 3,438; Referee: Darren Drysdale

30 September 2017 11	Grimsby Town	0–0	Lincoln City	Cleethorpes
13:00 BST	Clarke (yellow card) 90+3'	Report	Bostwick (yellow card) 27'	Stadium: Blundell Park; Attendance: 7,669; Referee: Carl Boyeson

7 October 2017 12	Port Vale	1–2	Grimsby Town	Burslem
15:00 BST	Pope 39'	Report	Jones 51'; Dembélé 67'	Stadium: Vale Park; Attendance: 5,849; Referee: Andy Woolmer

14 October 2017 13	Grimsby Town	0–0	Crawley Town	Cleethorpes
15:00 BST		Report	Smith (yellow card) 40'; Bulman (yellow card) 76'	Stadium: Blundell Park; Attendance: 4,007; Referee: Gavin Ward

17 October 2017 14	Cheltenham Town	2–3	Grimsby Town	Cheltenham
19:45 BST	Pell 26'; Hinds (yellow card) 85'; Winchester 86'	Report	Dembélé 13', 44'; Collins 42'; Davies (yellow card) 88'; Summerfield (yellow card) 90+2'	Stadium: Whaddon Road; Attendance: 2,469; Referee: Graham Salisbury

21 October 2017 15	Morecambe	0–0	Grimsby Town	Morecambe
15:00 BST	Wildig (yellow card) 73'	Report	Jones (yellow card) 35'	Stadium: Globe Arena; Attendance: 1,525; Referee: Ben Toner

28 October 2017 16	Grimsby Town	0–0	Cambridge United	Cleethorpes
15:00 BST	Dembélé (yellow card) 20'; Berrett (yellow card) 55'	Report	O'Neil (yellow card) 26'; Halliday (yellow card) 53'	Stadium: Blundell Park; Attendance: 4,091; Referee: Seb Stockbridge

11 November 2017 17	Exeter City	2–0	Grimsby Town	Exeter
15:00 GMT	Stockley 29' (yellow card) 54'; McAlinden 53'	Report	Davies (yellow card) 63'; Dixon (yellow card) 65'	Stadium: St James Park; Attendance: 3,854; Referee: Dean Whitestone

18 November 2017 18	Grimsby Town	0–1	Carlisle United	Cleethorpes
15:00 GMT		Report	Hill 70'	Stadium: Blundell Park; Attendance: 3,753; Referee: Robert Lewis

21 November 2017 19	Grimsby Town	3–2	Swindon Town	Cleethorpes
19:45 GMT	Matt 11'; Dembélé 71'; Rose 86'	Report	Anderson 26'; Matt 28' (o.g.); Preston (yellow card) 39'; Smith (yellow card) 62'	Stadium: Blundell Park; Attendance: 3,023; Referee: Martin Coy

25 November 2017 20	Barnet	0–2	Grimsby Town	Canons Park
15:00 GMT	Pascal (red card) 54'	Report	Matt 6'; Jones (yellow card) 59' (goal) 75'	Stadium: The Hive Stadium; Attendance: 2,033; Referee: Gavin Ward

9 December 2017 21	Grimsby Town	1–0	Forest Green Rovers	Cleethorpes
15:00 GMT	Rose 39'; Summerfield (yellow card) 74'; Dembélé (yellow card) 76'; McKeown (yellow card) 90+1'	Report	Fitzwater (yellow card) 33' (yellow-red card) 37'; Roberts (yellow card) 64'	Stadium: Blundell Park; Attendance: 4,398; Referee: Carl Boyeson

16 December 2017 22	Notts County	0–0	Grimsby Town	Nottingham
15:00 GMT	Yates (yellow card) 90+3'	Report	Jones (yellow card) 38'; McKeown (yellow card) 70'	Stadium: Meadow Lane; Attendance: 8,016; Referee: Craig Hicks

23 December 2017 23	Luton Town	2–0	Grimsby Town	Luton
15:00 GMT	Shinnie (yellow card) 38'; Berry 40'; Collins 61'	Report	Clarke (yellow card) 19'; McKeown (yellow card) 57'	Stadium: Kenilworth Road; Attendance: 9,102; Referee: Chris Sarginson

26 December 2017 24	Grimsby Town	1–1	Mansfield Town	Cleethorpes
13:00 GMT	Rose 10' (yellow card) 23'; Matt (yellow card) 56'; Mills (yellow card) 69'	Report	White (yellow card) 35'; Hunt (yellow card) 43'; Rose (yellow card) 55'; Angol 80'	Stadium: Blundell Park; Attendance: 5,704; Referee: Darren England

30 December 2017 25	Grimsby Town	0–3	Accrington Stanley	Cleethorpes
15:00 GMT	Davies (yellow card) 22'; Matt (yellow card) 73'	Report	Jackson (yellow card) 31' (goal) 77'; Brown (yellow card) 37'; Kee 55' (pen.); McConville 61'	Stadium: Blundell Park; Attendance: 4,188; Referee: Darren Drysdale

1 January 2018 26	Crewe Alexandra	2–0	Grimsby Town	Crewe
15:00 GMT	Porter 12'; Ng (yellow card) 12'; Walker 34'	Report	Woolford (yellow card) 34'; Berrett (yellow card) 56'	Stadium: Gresty Road; Attendance: 3,292; Referee: Seb Stockbridge

6 January 2018 27	Grimsby Town	0–2	Morecambe	Cleethorpes
15:00 GMT	Summerfield (yellow card) 34'	Report	Ellison 10'; Lavelle (yellow card) 37'; Kenyon (yellow card) 38'; Old 41'	Stadium: Blundell Park; Attendance: 3,104; Referee: Anthony Backhouse

13 January 2018 28	Grimsby Town	1–2	Newport County	Cleethorpes
15:00 GMT	Clarke (yellow card) 34'; Matt 80' (red card) 89'	Report	Willmott 19'; Labadie (yellow card) 52'; Nouble 56' (yellow card) 69'; White (yellow card) 88'	Stadium: Blundell Park; Attendance: 3,397; Referee: Graham Salisbury

20 January 2018 29	Colchester United	1–1	Grimsby Town	Colchester
15:00 GMT	Murray 47'	Report	Vernam 38'; Davies (yellow card) 66'	Stadium: Colchester Community Stadium; Attendance: 3,016; Referee: Craig Hicks

27 January 2018 30	Grimsby Town	0–1	Luton Town	Cleethorpes
15:00 GMT	Davies (yellow card) 41'; Dembélé (yellow card) 80'	Report	Cook (yellow card) 21' (yellow-red card) 33'; Collins 49'	Stadium: Blundell Park; Attendance: 4,159; Referee: Michael Salisbury

30 January 2018 31	Yeovil Town	3–0	Grimsby Town	Yeovil
19:45 GMT	Wing 14'; Browne 71'; Gray 76'	Report	Rose (red card) 6'; Summerfield (yellow card) 24'; Dixon (yellow card) 44'; Osborne (yellow card) 39' (yellow-red card) 60'	Stadium: Huish Park

3 February 2018 32	Grimsby Town	1–1	Cheltenham Town	Cleethorpes
15:00 GMT	Jackson 3'; Hall-Johnson (yellow card) 45'	Report	Boyle (yellow card) 36' (goal) 77'; Graham (yellow card) 37'	Stadium: Blundell Park; Attendance: 3,352; Referee: David Webb

10 February 2018 33	Crawley Town	3–0	Grimsby Town	Crawley
15:00 GMT	Yorwerth (yellow card) 39'; Smith 45+1' (pen.); Ahearne-Grant 62'; Boldewijn 69'	Report	Wilks (yellow card) 10'	Stadium: Broadfield Stadium; Attendance: 2,055; Referee: Kevin Johnson

17 February 2018 34	Cambridge United	3–1	Grimsby Town	Cambridge
15:00 GMT	Ikpeazu 19'; Waters 67'; Maris 71'	Report	Hooper 90' (pen.)	Stadium: Abbey Stadium; Attendance: 4,739; Referee: Dean Whitestone

24 February 2018 35	Grimsby Town	0–1	Exeter City	Cleethorpes
15:00 GMT	Dixon (yellow card) 73'	Report	Stockley 37' (pen.); Wilson (yellow card) 68' (yellow-red card) 81'; Moore-Taylor (yellow card) 79'	Stadium: Blundell Park; Attendance: 4,151; Referee: Andy Haines

3 March 2018 36	Carlisle United	2–0	Grimsby Town	Carlisle
15:00 GMT	Hope 3'; Hill (yellow card) 65'; Ellis 73'	Report	Dixon (yellow card) 41'; Berrett (yellow card) 45+1'	Stadium: Brunton Park; Attendance: 4,151; Referee: Scott Oldham

10 March 2018 37	Grimsby Town	1–1	Port Vale	Cleethorpes
15:00 GMT	Berrett (yellow card) 27' (goal) 90+1'; Clarke (yellow card) 90+14'	Report	Worrall 10' (yellow card) 79'; Tonge (yellow card) 30' (penalty missed) 63'; Howkins (yellow card) 88'	Stadium: Blundell Park; Attendance: 5,198; Referee: Seb Stockbridge

17 March 2018 38	Lincoln City	3–1	Grimsby Town	Lincoln
	Frecklington 31'; Green 34'; Wharton 39'; Palmer (yellow card) 90'	Report	Clifton (yellow card) 22'; Davies 45+2' (pen.)	Stadium: Sincil Bank; Attendance: 9,774; Referee: David Coote

24 March 2018 39	Coventry City	4–0	Grimsby Town	Coventry
15:00 GMT	Vincenti 38'; McNulty 55', 76', 87'	Report		Stadium: Ricoh Arena; Attendance: 8,755; Referee: Ollie Yates

30 March 2018 40	Grimsby Town	0–0	Stevenage	Cleethorpes
15:00 GMT		Report	Bowditch (yellow card) 90+3'	Stadium: Blundell Park; Attendance: 5,368; Referee: Martin Coy

2 April 2018 41	Wycombe Wanderers	2–1	Grimsby Town	High Wycombe
15:00 GMT	Jombati (yellow card) 43'; O'Nien (yellow card) 53'; El-Abd 60'; Kashket 67'; Williams (yellow card) 68'	Report	Woolford 15'; Fox (yellow card) 53'; Berrett (yellow card) 60'	Stadium: Adams Park; Attendance: 5,215; Referee: Chris Sarginson

7 April 2018 42	Grimsby Town	1–0	Chesterfield	Cleethorpes
15:00 GMT	Fox (yellow card) 53'; Woolford (yellow card) 55'; Dembélé (yellow card) 68'; Rose 88' (pen.) (yellow card) 88'	Report	Reed (yellow card) 79'; Talbot (yellow card) 90'	Stadium: Blundell Park; Attendance: 6,780; Referee: Bobby Madley

14 April 2018 43	Grimsby Town	2–2	Barnet	Cleethorpes
15:00 GMT	Collins 6'; Clarke (yellow card) 45+2'; Rose 82' (pen.); McSheffrey (yellow card) 90+5'	Report	Weston (yellow card) 16' (goal) 79'; Nelson (yellow card) 42'; Akpa Akpro 62'; Coulthirst (yellow card) 71'; Clough (yellow card) 84'; Sweeney (yellow card) 90+5'	Stadium: Blundell Park; Attendance: 5,416; Referee: Darren Bond

21 April 2018 44	Swindon Town	0–1	Grimsby Town	Swindon
15:00 GMT	Mullin (yellow card) 31'	Report	Hall-Johnson (yellow card) 40'; Rose 45+2' (pen.) (yellow card) 45+3'	Stadium: County Ground; Attendance: 6,690; Referee: John Brooks

28 April 2018 45	Grimsby Town	2–1	Notts County	Cleethorpes
15:00 GMT	Clarke 29'; Woolford (yellow card) 59'; Matt 90+3'	Report	Virtue-Thick (yellow card) 24'; Jones 89'	Stadium: Blundell Park; Attendance: 7,133; Referee: Carl Boyeson

5 May 2018 46	Forest Green Rovers	0–3	Grimsby Town	Nailsworth
15:00 BST	Gunning (yellow card) 19'	Report	Hooper 52', 84', 90'; Fox (yellow card) 67'	Stadium: The New Lawn; Attendance: 3,880; Referee: Seb Stockbridge

=== FA Cup ===
On 16 October 2017, Grimsby Town were drawn away to Plymouth Argyle in the first round.

4 November 2017 First round	Plymouth Argyle	1–0	Grimsby Town	Plymouth
15:00 GMT	Carey 9' (yellow card) 48'	Report	Davies (yellow card) 60'; Dixon (yellow card) 72'	Stadium: Home Park; Attendance: 5,137; Referee: John Busby

=== EFL Cup ===
On 16 June 2017, Grimsby Town were drawn at home to Derby County in the first round. Following the abandonment for the first round tie, the fixture was rescheduled for 22 August 2017.

8 August 2017 First round	Grimsby Town	A–A	Derby County	Cleethorpes
19:45 BST				Stadium: Blundell Park

22 August 2017 First round	Grimsby Town	0–1	Derby County	Cleethorpes
19:45 BST	Berrett (yellow card) 28'; Davies (yellow card) 55' (yellow-red card) 63'	Report	Lawrence (yellow card) 38'; Pearce (yellow card) 47'; Vydra 53' (pen.); Bryson (yellow card) 69'	Stadium: Blundell Park; Attendance: 3,033; Referee: Trevor Kettle

=== EFL Trophy ===
On 12 July 2017, Grimsby Town were drawn against Doncaster Rovers, Scunthorpe United and Sunderland U23s in Northern Group H.

Pos	Lge	Team	Pld	W	PW	PL	L	GF	GA	GD	Pts	Qualification
1	L1	Scunthorpe United (Q)	3	2	0	1	0	5	2	+3	7	Round 2
2	L1	Doncaster Rovers (Q)	3	1	2	0	0	2	1	+1	7	Round 2
3	L2	Grimsby Town (E)	3	0	0	2	1	3	4	−1	2	
4	ACA	Sunderland U23s (E)	3	0	1	0	2	2	5	−3	2	

Updated to match(es) played on 8 October 2017. Source: EFL.com
(E) Eliminated; (Q) Qualified to the phase indicated

29 August 2017 Group Game 1	Grimsby Town	1–1 (3–4 p)	Doncaster Rovers	Cleethorpes
19:45 BST	Jones (yellow card) 20'; Cardwell 29'; Davies (yellow card) 69'	Report	Williams 38'; Mandeville (yellow card) 86'	Stadium: Blundell Park; Attendance: 862
	Penalties
	Davies (penalty scored); Hooper (penalty scored); Mills (penalty scored); Jones (penalty missed); Bolarinwa (penalty missed); Cardwell (penalty missed)		Middleton (penalty scored); Williams (penalty missed); Beestin (penalty scored); Mandeville (penalty missed); Alcock (penalty scored); Kongolo (penalty scored)

3 October 2017 Group Game 2	Scunthorpe United	2–1	Grimsby Town	Scunthorpe
19:45 BST	Madden (yellow card) 20'; Hopper 43', 80'; Redmond (yellow card) 50' van Veen (yellow card) 90+2'	Report	Jaiyesimi 32'	Stadium: Glanford Park; Attendance: 1,987; Referee: Tom Nield

8 November 2017 Group Game 3	Grimsby Town	1–1 (6–7 p)	Sunderland U23s	Cleethorpes
19:45 GMT	Hooper 78' (pen.)	Report	Love 79'; Bale (yellow card) 90+3'	Stadium: Blundell Park; Attendance: 248; Referee: Scott Oldham
	Penalties
	Hooper (penalty scored); Kelly (penalty missed); Jaiyesimi (penalty scored); Rose (penalty scored); Matt (penalty missed); Mills (penalty scored); Osborne (penalty scored); Cardwell (penalty scored); McAllister (penalty missed)		Beadling (penalty missed); Molyneux (penalty scored); Robson (penalty scored); Love (penalty scored); Hackett (penalty missed); Greenwood (penalty scored); Galloway (penalty scored); Rodwell (penalty scored); Bale (penalty scored)

== Squad overview ==
Note: Flags indicate national team as defined under FIFA eligibility rules; some limited exceptions apply. Players may hold more than one non-FIFA nationality.

No.	Pos.	Nation	Player
1	GK	IRL	James McKeown
2	DF	ENG	Ben Davies (vice-captain)
3	DF	SCO	Paul Dixon
4	DF	ENG	Sean McAllister
5	DF	ENG	Nathan Clarke (captain)
6	DF	WAL	Danny Collins (vice-captain)
7	MF	IRL	James Berrett
8	MF	ENG	Mitch Rose
9	FW	ENG	JJ Hooper
10	FW	ENG	Sam Jones (Departed in January 2018)
11	MF	ENG	Sam Kelly
12	DF	ENG	Zak Mills
14	DF	ENG	Karleigh Osborne
15	MF	ENG	Harry Clifton
16	MF	ENG	Jamey Osborne (Departed in January 2018)
16	DF	ENG	Easah Suliman (on loan from Aston Villa)

No.	Pos.	Nation	Player
17	FW	SCO	Harry Cardwell
18	MF	ENG	Tom Bolarinwa (Departed in January 2018)
18	FW	ENG	Mallik Wilks (on loan from Leeds United)
19	MF	ENG	Luke Summerfield
20	MF	ENG	Diallang Jaiyesimi (on loan from Norwich City)
21	FW	ENG	Scott Vernon
22	MF	ENG	Chris Clements
23	FW	NED	Akwasi Asante (Departed in February 2018)
24	DF	ENG	Jack Keeble
25	MF	ENG	Martyn Woolford
26	MF	ENG	Thomas Sawyer
27	MF	CIV	Siriki Dembélé
28	FW	JAM	Ahkeem Rose
29	FW	JAM	Jamille Matt (on loan from Blackpool)
30	GK	ENG	Ben Killip
31	DF	ENG	Reece Hall-Johnson
33	GK	ENG	Jake Kean (on loan from Sheffield Wednesday)
34	FW	ENG	Charles Vernam (on loan from Derby County)
35	GK	ENG	Andy Warrington (Goalkeeping Coach)
39	FW	CAN	Simeon Jackson (on loan from Walsall)

== Transfers ==
=== Transfers in ===
Date from	Position	Nationality	Name	From	Fee	Ref.
1 July 2017	DF	(England)	Nathan Clarke	(England) Coventry City	Free	
1 July 2017	MF	(Scotland)	Siriki Dembélé	Nike Academy	Free	
1 July 2017	MF	(England)	Sam Kelly	(England) Port Vale	Free	
1 July 2017	MF	(England)	Mitch Rose	(Wales) Newport County	Free	
15 July 2017	GK	(England)	Ben Killip	(England) Norwich City	Free	
17 July 2017	FW	(Scotland)	Harry Cardwell	(England) Reading	Free	
26 July 2017	DF	(England)	Karleigh Osborne	(Scotland) Kilmarnock	Free	
29 July 2017	DF	(Scotland)	Paul Dixon	(Scotland) Dundee United	Free	
8 August 2017	FW	(England)	JJ Hooper	(England) Port Vale	Free	
31 August 2017	MF	(England)	Martyn Woolford	(England) Fleetwood Town	Free	
15 October 2017	DF	(England)	Reece Hall-Johnson	(England) Braintree Town	Free	
9 March 2018	DF	(England)	Andrew Fox	(Sweden) AFC Eskilstuna	Free	
15 March 2018	FW	(England)	Gary McSheffrey	(England) Eastleigh	Free	

=== Transfers out ===
Date from	Position	Nationality	Name	To	Fee	Ref.
1 July 2017	DF	(England)	Danny Andrew	(England) Doncaster Rovers	Free	
1 July 2017	MF	(Antigua and Barbuda)	Rhys Browne	(England) Yeovil Town	Undisclosed	
1 July 2017	FW	(England)	Ashley Chambers	(England) Nuneaton Town	Released	(Note: Ashley Chambers joined Nuneaton Town following his release.)
1 July 2017	MF	(England)	Craig Disley	(England) Alfreton Town	Released	(Note: Craig Disley joined Alfreton Town following his release.)
1 July 2017	DF	(England)	Josh Gowling	(England) Torquay United	Released	(Note: Josh Gowling joined Torquay United following his release.)
1 July 2017	DF	(Republic of Ireland)	Gavin Gunning	(England) Port Vale	Released	(Note: Gavin Gunning joined Port Vale following his release.)
1 July 2017	DF	(England)	Dan Jones	(England) Barrow	Released	(Note: Dan Jones joined Barrow following his release.)
1 July 2017	DF	(England)	Shaun Pearson	(Wales) Wrexham	Contract expired	
17 July 2017	DF	(England)	Andrew Boyce	(England) Eastleigh	Free	
29 July 2017	FW	(Tanzania)	Adi Yussuf	(England) Barrow	Undisclosed	
9 January 2018	MF	(England)	Tom Bolarinwa	(England) Sutton United	Undisclosed	
9 January 2018	MF	(England)	Jamey Osborne	(England) Solihull Moors	Undisclosed	
31 January 2018	FW	(England)	Sam Jones	(England) Shrewsbury Town	Undisclosed	
7 February 2018	FW	(Netherlands)	Akwasi Asante	(England) Tamworth	Mutual consent	(Note: Asante joined Tamworth following his release.)

=== Loans in ===
Start date	Position	Nationality	Name	From	End date	Ref.
9 August 2017	MF	(England)	Diallang Jaiyesimi	(England) Norwich City	30 June 2018	
29 August 2017	FW	(Jamaica)	Jamille Matt	(England) Blackpool	30 June 2018	
5 January 2018	GK	(England)	Jake Kean	(England) Sheffield Wednesday	30 June 2018	
8 January 2018	FW	(England)	Charles Vernam	(England) Derby County	30 June 2018	
26 January 2018	FW	(England)	Mallik Wilks	(England) Leeds United	30 June 2018	
31 January 2018	FW	(Canada)	Simeon Jackson	(England) Walsall	30 June 2018	
31 January 2018	DF	(England)	Easah Suliman	(England) Aston Villa	30 June 2018	

=== Loans out ===
Start date	Position	Nationality	Name	To	End date	Ref.
24 August 2017	MF	(England)	Max Wright	(England) Scarborough Athletic	30 June 2018	
29 September 2017	MF	(England)	Chris Clements	(England) Barrow	31 December 2017	
16 October 2017	FW	(Netherlands)	Akwasi Asante	(England) Solihull Moors	1 January 2018	
10 November 2017	MF	(England)	Tom Bolarinwa	(England) Sutton United	9 January 2018	
1 December 2017	MF	(England)	Jamey Osborne	(England) Solihull Moors	9 January 2018	
8 December 2017	MF	(England)	Sean McAllister	(England) York City	8 January 2018	
31 January 2018	MF	(England)	Chris Clements	(England) Forest Green Rovers	30 June 2018	
