= Siriki Dembélé =

Ivorian footballer (born 1996)

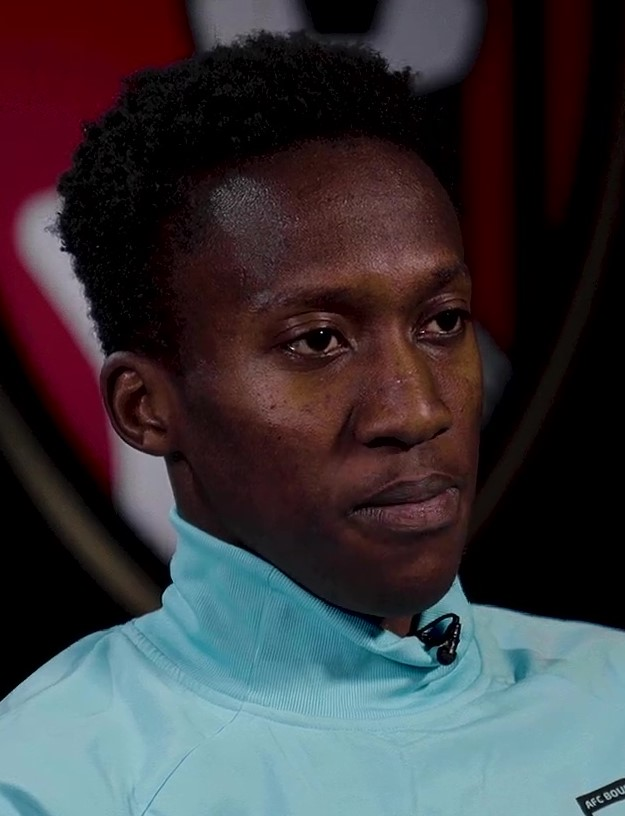
- Dembélé with AFC Bournemouth in 2022

Personal information
- Full name: Ben Siriki Dembélé
- Date of birth: 7 September 1996 (age 30)
- Place of birth: Bouaflé, Ivory Coast
- Height: 1.73 m (5 ft 8 in)
- Positions: Winger; striker

Team information
- Current team: Oxford United
- Number: 23

Youth career
- 2009–2013: Dundee United
- 2015–2016: Ayr United
- 2016–2017: Nike Football Academy

Senior career*
Years	Team	Apps	(Gls)
2017–2018	Grimsby Town	36	(4)
2018–2022	Peterborough United	129	(26)
2022–2023	AFC Bournemouth	19	(2)
2023	→ Auxerre (loan)	12	(0)
2023–2024	Birmingham City	34	(6)
2024–	Oxford United	45	(2)
- * Club domestic league appearances and goals as of 03:42, 2 March 2026 (UTC)

Ben Siriki Dembélé (born 7 September 1996) is an Ivorian-born Scottish-raised professional footballer who plays as a left winger or striker for EFL League One club Oxford United.

Dembélé is known for his speed, taking on players with his dribbling ability, and holding the ball bringing others into play. At the age of 12, Dembélé started his career with Dundee United's youth system. He then moved to playing in their academy. Dembélé returned south of the border joining the Nike Football Academy in May 2016; he had trials with Championship clubs Barnsley and Huddersfield Town in September 2016. In May 2017, Dembélé moved to Grimsby Town signing his first professional contract. On 22 June 2018, he joined Peterborough United on a three-year deal for an undisclosed fee. He joined AFC Bournemouth in January 2022 on a three-and-a-half-year deal and spent the second half of the 2022–23 season on loan to French Ligue 1 club Auxerre before returning to the Championship with Birmingham City in July 2023. A year later, after Birmingham's relegation, he joined Oxford United.

== Club career ==
=== Early career ===
Dembélé was born in Bouaflé, Ivory Coast. He relocated with his family to London before moving to Govan, Scotland, in 2004. He attended Lourdes Secondary School in Glasgow, and started his career with Dundee United where he spent three years in their youth system. He then moved to Ayr United in their U20s academy team in 2015.

Several amateur players including Dembélé attended the 'Nike Most Wanted' 2016 trials, where he won a place at the Nike Football Academy; he was the only Scottish player selected for the St George's Park outfit, developing his skills in front of elite coaches and mentors. While at the academy, he had trials with EFL Championship clubs Barnsley in August and Huddersfield Town in September 2016 and was due to sign for them, however, due to suffering an injury he was out for four months and went back to the Nike Academy in January 2017.

=== Grimsby Town ===
After training and featuring in a behind-closed-doors friendly against Barnsley at Blundell Park, Dembélé joined EFL League Two side Grimsby Town on 25 May 2017 on a one-year contract, the club having the option to retain him for a second year. He did have the opportunity to trial with fellow League Two club Stevenage, Dembélé said: "I still had a few clubs to go before making my decision, but once I found out I was joining this club to sign my very first professional contract it felt amazing."

Dembélé made his full professional debut with Grimsby on 5 August 2017, in their 3–1 victory at Chesterfield, where he ran at pace through the midfield beating three men and placed a through ball to Sam Jones, which put Grimsby into a 2–0 lead. Dembélé scored his first goal for Grimsby in the 2–1 win at Port Vale on 7 October 2017, a through ball from Luke Summerfield, which Dembélé latched onto and rounded the keeper to win the game. Ten days later, he scored a brace in a 3–2 victory at Cheltenham Town.

Dembélé was awarded EFL Young Player of the Month for October 2017.

In June 2018, Dembélé submitted a transfer request.

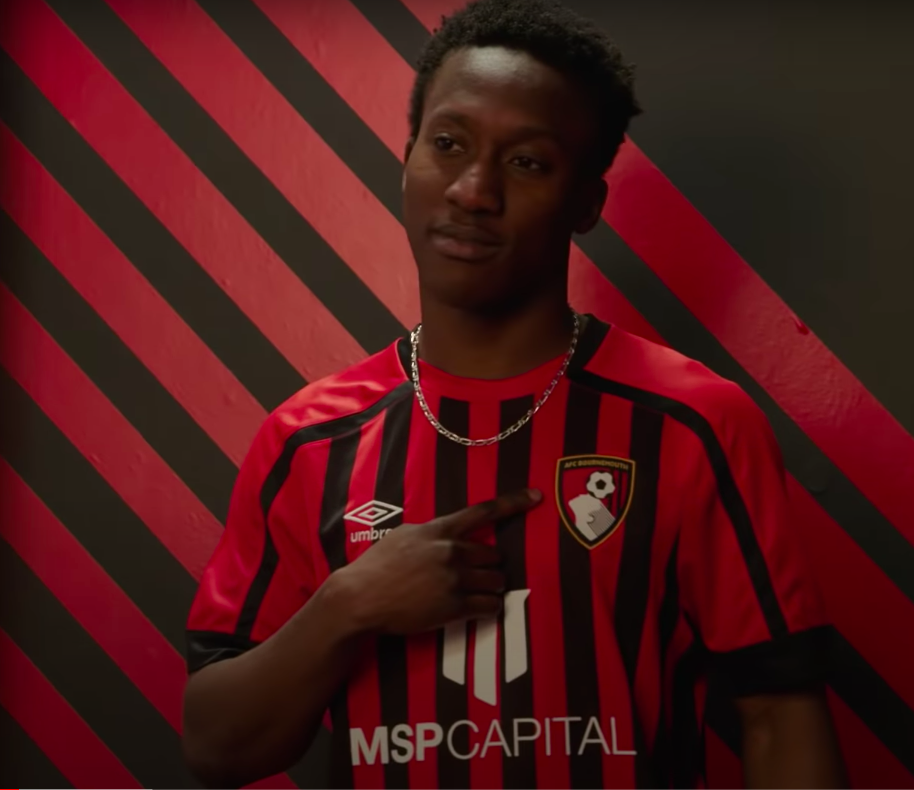
Dembélé with AFC Bournemouth in 2022

=== Peterborough United ===
Dembélé joined Peterborough United on a three-year deal for an undisclosed fee on 22 June 2018. Despite handing in a transfer request in January 2021 stating personal reasons and a desire to play at a higher level, he was part of the team that won promotion to the EFL Championship from EFL League One in the 2020/21 season.

=== AFC Bournemouth ===
On 31 January 2022, Dembélé joined EFL Championship club AFC Bournemouth on a three-and-a-half-year contract, for an undisclosed fee. Commenting on the move amidst interest from other clubs, Dembélé stated that Bournemouth was his top choice because of the higher chance of promotion and the club's style of play. He scored his first goal for the club in his second appearance; a last minute winner against Blackpool on 12 February 2022.

==== Loan to Auxerre ====
On 31 January 2023, Dembélé moved to Ligue 1 club Auxerre on loan until the end of the season.

=== Birmingham City ===
Dembélé signed for Championship club Birmingham City on 14 July 2023; the fee was undisclosed.

=== Oxford United ===
Dembélé joined Oxford United of the Championship on 29 August 2024 on a long-term contract. The fee was undisclosed but it was widely reported that Oxford broke their transfer record to sign him, meaning the fee would have surpassed the £650,000 the club paid for Marvin Johnson in 2016, with Birmingham thought to have valued the player at between £1 million and £1.5 million.

== Style of play ==
Dembélé is ambipedal although mainly right footed; he primarily plays on the left wing in 4–3–3 and 4–2–3–1 formations. He prefers to play as a striker in a 4–4–2 formation. Dembélé is known for his speed, taking on players with his dribbling skills and holding the ball bringing others into play.

== Personal life ==
Dembélé has a younger brother, Karamoko, who is also a professional footballer and plays for Queens Park Rangers. Both are eligible to play for England, Scotland or Ivory Coast. Dembélé is a Muslim, and observes Ramadan while continuing his football career.

== Career statistics ==
As of match played 3 February 2026

Appearances and goals by club, season and competition
Club	Season	League			FA Cup		League Cup		Other		Total	
Club	Season	Division	Apps	Goals	Apps	Goals	Apps	Goals	Apps	Goals	Apps	Goals
Grimsby Town	2017–18	League Two	36	4	1	0	1	0	1 (Note: Appearances in EFL Trophy)	0	39	4
Peterborough United	2018–19	League One	38	5	4	1	1	0	4	1	47	7
Peterborough United	2019–20	League One	25	5	1	0	0	0	4	1	30	6
Peterborough United	2020–21	League One	42	11	2	1	1	0	1	1	46	13
Peterborough United	2021–22	Championship	24	5	1	0	0	0	—		25	5
Peterborough United	Total		129	26	8	2	2	0	9	3	148	31
AFC Bournemouth	2021–22	Championship	13	2	—		—		—		13	2
AFC Bournemouth	2022–23	Premier League	6	0	1	0	2	0	—		9	0
AFC Bournemouth	Total		19	2	1	0	2	0	—		22	2
Auxerre (loan)	2022–23	Ligue 1	12	0	0	0	—		—		12	0
Birmingham City	2023–24	Championship	33	6	3	0	1	0	—		37	6
Birmingham City	2024–25	League One	1	0	0	0	—		—		1	0
Birmingham City	Total		34	6	3	0	1	0	—		38	6
Oxford United	2024–25	Championship	26	2	1	0	—		—		27	2
Oxford United	2025–26	Championship	19	0	1	0	1	0	—		21	0
Oxford United	Total		45	2	2	0	1	0	—		48	2
Career total			275	40	15	2	7	0	10	3	307	45

== Honours ==
AFC Bournemouth

- Championship runner-up: 2021–22

Individual

- EFL Young Player of the Month: October 2017
