= 2016–17 Grimsby Town F.C. season =

Grimsby Town
2016–17 season
- Chairman: John Fenty
- Manager: Paul Hurst (Left 24/10/16); Marcus Bignot (Sacked 10/04/17); Russell Slade (From 12/4/17)
- Stadium: Blundell Park
- FA Cup: First round (vs. Bolton Wanderers)
- League Cup: First round (vs. Derby County)
Home colours	Away colours	Third colours

The 2016–17 season is Grimsby Town's 139th season of existence and their first back in League Two after gaining promotion the previous season. Along with competing in League Two, the club will also participate in the FA Cup, League Cup and Football League Trophy.

The season covers the period from 1 July 2016 to 30 June 2017.

== Transfers ==
=== In ===
Date from	Position	Nationality	Name	From	Fee	Ref.
1 July 2016	LB	(England)	Danny Andrew	(England) Fleetwood Town	Free transfer	
1 July 2016	CM	(Republic of Ireland)	James Berrett	(England) York City	Undisclosed	
1 July 2016	RW	(England)	Tom Bolarinwa	(England) Sutton United	Undisclosed	
1 July 2016	CB	(England)	Andrew Boyce	(England) Scunthorpe United	Free transfer	
1 July 2016	CF	(Antigua and Barbuda)	Rhys Browne	(England) Aldershot Town	Undisclosed	
1 July 2016	CF	(England)	Ashley Chambers	(England) Dagenham & Redbridge	Free transfer	
1 July 2016	RB	(England)	(England) Ben Davies	Portsmouth	Free transfer	
1 July 2016	LB	(England)	Dan Jones	(England) Hartlepool United	Free transfer	
1 July 2016	CM	(England)	Sean McAllister	(England) Scunthorpe United	Free transfer	
1 July 2016	RB	(England)	Zak Mills	(England) Boston United	Free transfer	
1 July 2016	CM	(England)	Luke Summerfield	(England) York City	Free transfer	
30 July 2016	CF	(England)	Scott Vernon	(England) Shrewsbury Town	Free transfer	
12 September 2016	CB	(Wales)	Danny Collins	(England) Rotherham United	Free transfer	
1 January 2017	CF	(Tanzania)	Adi Yussuf	(England) Mansfield Town	Free transfer	
5 January 2017	CB	(Republic of Ireland)	Gavin Gunning	(Scotland) Greenock Morton	Free transfer	
18 January 2017	CF	(Netherlands)	Akwasi Asante	(England) Solihull Moors	Undisclosed	
18 January 2017	CM	(England)	Jamey Osborne	(England) Solihull Moors	Undisclosed	
19 January 2017	CM	(England)	Chris Clements	(England) Mansfield Town	Undisclosed	
31 January 2017	AM	(Wales)	Sam Jones	(England) Gateshead	Undisclosed	

=== Out ===
Date from	Position	Nationality	Name	To	Fee	Ref.
1 July 2016	CF	(Republic of Ireland)	Pádraig Amond	(England) Hartlepool United	Free transfer	
1 July 2016	RW	(England)	Nathan Arnold	(England) Lincoln City	Free transfer	
1 July 2016	GK	(England)	Callum Bastock	Free agent	Released	
1 July 2016	CM	(England)	Craig Clay	(Scotland) Motherwell (Note: Following Clay's release, he signed for Motherwell.)	Released	
1 July 2016	RB	(England)	Danny East	(England) Guiseley (Note: Following East's release, he signed for Guiseley.)	Released	
1 July 2016	CM	(Republic of Ireland)	Conor Henderson	(England) Crawley Town	Released	
1 July 2016	RW	(England)	Marcus Marshall	(England) Boston United (Note: Following Marshall's release, he signed for Boston United.)	Released	
1 July 2016	LM	(England)	Andy Monkhouse	(England) Alfreton Town (Note: Following Monkhouse's release, he signed for Alfreton Town.)	Released	
1 July 2016	CM	(England)	Jon Nolan	(England) Chesterfield	Free transfer	
1 July 2016	CB	(Democratic Republic of the Congo)	Aristote Nsiala	(England) Hartlepool United	Free transfer	
1 July 2016	CF	(England)	Jon-Paul Pittman	(England) Harrogate Town (Note: Following Pittman's release, he signed for Harrogate Town.)	Released	
1 July 2016	LB	(Scotland)	Gregor Robertson	Retired	Released	
1 July 2016	LM	(Grenada)	Anthony Straker	(England) Aldershot Town (Note: Following Straker's release, he signed for Aldershot Town.)	Released	
1 July 2016	CB	(England)	Josh Sunter	(England) Grimsby Borough	Released	
1 July 2016	RB	(Scotland)	Richard Tait	(Scotland) Motherwell	Free transfer	
31 January 2017	CF	(England)	Omar Bogle	(England) Wigan Athletic	Undisclosed	

=== Loans in ===
Date from	Position	Nationality	Name	From	Date until	Ref.
1 July 2016	AM	(England)	Dominic Vose	(England) Scunthorpe United	End of season	
22 July 2016	CF	(England)	Kayden Jackson	(England) Barnsley	End of season	
31 August 2016	CM	(Montserrat)	Brandon Comley	(England) Queens Park Rangers	3 January 2017	
31 August 2016	GK	(England)	Dean Henderson	(England) Manchester United	3 February 2017	(Note: On 31 December 2016, Henderson's loan was extended.) (Note: On 3 February 2017, Dean Henderson's loan was terminated.)
31 August 2016	CF	(England)	Shaun Tuton	Barnsley	31 December 2016	(Note: On 31 December 2016, Shaun Tuton's loan was terminated.)
13 January 2017	CM	(Montserrat)	Brandon Comley	(England) Queens Park Rangers	End of season	
27 January 2017	AM	(England)	Luke Maxwell	(England) Birmingham City	End of season	
31 January 2017	CF	(England)	Calum Dyson	(England) Everton	End of season	

=== Loans out ===
Date from	Position	Nationality	Name	To	Date until	Ref.
12 January 2017	RW	(Antigua and Barbuda)	Rhys Browne	(England) Macclesfield Town	End of Season	
6 February 2017	CM	(England)	Luke Summerfield	(England) Macclesfield Town	End of Season	

== Competitions ==
=== Pre-season friendlies ===
12 July 2016 Friendly	North Ferriby United	4–1	Grimsby Town	North Ferriby
19:00	Bateson 26'; Fry 35'; Brogan 61'; Hare 64'	Report	Summerfield 47'	Stadium: Grange Lane

15 July 2016 Friendly	Grimsby Town	0–0	Hull City	Cleethorpes
19:30		Report		Stadium: Blundell Park

19 July 2016 Friendly	Boston United	1–1	Grimsby Town	Boston
19:30	Adams 15'		Vose 63'	Stadium: York Street

=== League Two ===
==== League table ====
Pos	Team	Pld	W	D	L	GF	GA	GD	Pts
12	Mansfield Town	46	17	15	14	54	50	+4	66
13	Accrington Stanley	46	17	14	15	59	56	+3	65
14	Grimsby Town	46	17	11	18	59	63	−4	62
15	Barnet	46	14	15	17	57	64	−7	57
16	Notts County	46	16	8	22	54	76	−22	56

Updated to match(es) played on 6 May 2017. Source: BBC Sport
Rules for classification: 1) Points; 2) Goal difference; 3) Number of goals scored

==== Result summary ====
Overall								Home						Away					
Pld	W	D	L	GF	GA	GD	Pts	W	D	L	GF	GA	GD	W	D	L	GF	GA	GD
46	17	11	18	59	63	−4	62	9	6	8	32	31	+1	8	5	10	27	32	−5

==== Results by matchday ====
Matchday	1	2	3	4	5	6	7	8	9	10	11	12	13	14	15	16	17	18	19	20	21	22	23	24	25	26	27	28	29	30	31	32	33	34	35	36	37	38	39	40	41	42	43	44	45	46
Ground	H	A	A	H	H	A	A	H	A	H	H	A	A	H	A	H	A	H	A	H	A	H	H	A	A	H	H	A	H	A	A	H	A	H	H	A	A	H	A	H	A	H	A	H	A	H
Result	W	L	L	L	W	D	W	L	W	W	L	D	W	L	D	D	W	D	L	L	L	W	D	W	W	L	W	L	D	L	D	W	L	W	L	W	L	D	D	L	W	W	L	W	L	D
Position	3	11	16	21	12	14	11	15	12	6	9	10	6	8	8	7	6	6	9	12	14	12	12	12	10	11	11	12	11	13	13	12	14	10	13	13	13	13	13	14	14	14	14	14	14	14

A = Away; H = Home; W = Win; D = Draw; L = Loss

==== Matches ====
6 August 2016 1	Grimsby Town	2–0	Morecambe	Cleethorpes
15:00 BST	Jackson 6'; Bolarinwa (yellow card) 43'; Davies 63'; Gowling (red card) 71'; McKeown (yellow card) 81'	Report	Fleming (yellow card) 62'	Stadium: Blundell Park

13 August 2016 2	Wycombe Wanderers	2–1	Grimsby Town	High Wycombe
15:00 BST	McGinn (yellow card) 38'; Jombati 55'; Stewart 90+1'	Report	Bolarinwa (yellow card) 47'; Boyce 79'; Berrett (yellow card) 89'	Stadium: Adams Park

16 August 2016 3	Colchester United	3–2	Grimsby Town	Colchester
19:45 BST	Dickenson 10', 39'; Guthrie (yellow card) 26' (goal) 34'	Report	Boyce (yellow card) 21'; Disley 48'; Pearson (yellow card) 77'; Bogle 90+3'	Stadium: Colchester Community Stadium

20 August 2016 4	Grimsby Town	1–2	Leyton Orient	Cleethorpes
15:00 BST	Vose 90+2'; Chambers (yellow card) 90+4'; Andrew (yellow card) 90+4'	Report	Erichot (yellow card) 33'; Kelly 58'; Palmer 77'; Massey (yellow card) 86'	Stadium: Blundell Park

27 August 2016 5	Grimsby Town	5–2	Stevenage	Cleethorpes
15:00 BST	Bogle 15', 50', 90+4'; Summerfield 40'; Vose 49'; Andrew (yellow card) 73'	Report	Franks 45+2'; McAnuff 66'; Kennedy (yellow card) 75'	Stadium: Blundell Park; Attendance: 4,425; Referee: Darren Handley

3 September 2016 6	Notts County	2–2	Grimsby Town	Nottingham
15:00 BST	Forte 77'; Collins 89'	Report	Pearson 34'; Bogle 56'	Stadium: Meadow Lane

10 September 2016 7	Luton Town	1–2	Grimsby Town	Luton
15:00 BST	Sheehan (yellow card) 43'; Rea 59'; Potts (yellow card) 62'; Cook (yellow card) 75'	Report	Bogle 29', 82'; Vose (yellow card) 78'; Comley (yellow card) 88'; McKeown (yellow card) 90+4'; Jackson (yellow card) 90+4'	Stadium: Kenilworth Road Stadium

17 September 2016 8	Grimsby Town	0–2	Crewe Alexandra	Cleethorpes
15:00 BST	Bogle (yellow card) 60'; Gowling (yellow card) 72'	Report	Bakayogo (yellow card) 27'; Hollands (yellow card) 43'; Cooper 45+1'; Jones 85'	Stadium: Blundell Park; Attendance: 5,289; Referee: Michael Salisbury

24 September 2016 9	Mansfield Town	0–1	Grimsby Town	Mansfield
12:15 BST	Shearer (yellow card) 17'; Pearce (yellow card) 17'	Report	Bogle 17' (pen.); Chambers (yellow card) 72'	Stadium: One Call Stadium

27 September 2016 10	Grimsby Town	1–0	Newport County	Cleethorpes
19:45 BST	McKeown (yellow card) 59'; Bogle 88' (pen.) (yellow card) 89'	Report	Bennett (yellow card) 35'; Parkin (yellow card) 59'; Tozer (yellow card) 77'	Stadium: Blundell Park; Attendance: 4,296; Referee: Ben Toner

1 October 2016 11	Grimsby Town	0–3	Hartlepool United	Cleethorpes
15:00 BST		Report	Carroll (yellow card) 4'; Amond 25', 36'; Thomas 60'	Stadium: Blundell Park; Attendance: 5,713; Referee: Chris Sarginson

8 October 2016 12	Exeter City	0–0	Grimsby Town	Exeter
15:00 BST		Report	Comley (yellow card) 28'; Gowling (yellow card) 78'	Stadium: St. James' Park; Attendance: 3,557; Referee: John Brooks

15 October 2016 13	Cambridge United	0–1	Grimsby Town	Cambridge
15:00 BST	Dunne (yellow card) 49'; Roberts (yellow card) 82'; Clark (yellow card) 87'	Report	Berrett 26'; Tuton (yellow card) 90+2'	Stadium: The R Costings Abbey Stadium; Attendance: 5,121; Referee: Charles Breakspear

22 October 2016 14	Grimsby Town	0–1	Cheltenham Town	Cleethorpes
15:00 BST	Andrew (yellow card) 71'	Report	Waters 9'; Pell (yellow card) 70'; Munns (yellow card) 80'; Dayton (yellow card) 85'	Stadium: Blundell Park; Attendance: 4,809; Referee: Darren Deadman

29 October 2016 15	Yeovil Town	0–0	Grimsby Town	Yeovil
15:00 BST	Lawless (yellow card) 30'; Mugabi (yellow card) 37'; Smith (yellow card) 50'	Report	Berrett (yellow card) 30'	Stadium: Huish Park Stadium; Attendance: 3,733; Referee: Brendan Malone

12 November 2016 16	Grimsby Town	2–2	Barnet	Cleethorpes
15:00 GMT	Bogle 22', 35' (penalty missed) 90+3'; Chambers (yellow card) 43'; Bolarinwa (yellow card) 81'; Collins (yellow card) 90+6'	Report	Dembélé (yellow card) 45+2'; Akinde 50' (pen.), 55' (pen.); Champion (yellow card) 74'; Sesay (red card) 90'	Stadium: Blundell Park; Attendance: 5,519; Referee: Seb Stockbridge

19 November 2016 17	Plymouth Argyle	0–3	Grimsby Town	Plymouth
15:00 GMT		Report	Collins 44'; Bogle 62', 86'	Stadium: Home Park; Attendance: 10,241; Referee: Rob Jones

22 November 2016 18	Grimsby Town	2–2	Carlisle United	Cleethorpes
19:45 GMT	Gowling (yellow card) 41'; Bogle 50' (pen.); Bolarinwa 78'	Report	Raynes (yellow card) 28'; Wyke 44'; Mills 67' (o.g.); Jones (yellow card) 83'	Stadium: Blundell Park; Attendance: 4,818; Referee: Nigel Miller

26 November 2016 19	Crawley Town	3–2	Grimsby Town	Crawley
15:00 GMT	Yorwerth (yellow card) 20'; Young (yellow card) 26'; Collins 31'; Roberts 56', 79'; Payne (yellow card) 88'; Boldewijn (yellow card) 90+5'	Report	Bogle 45+2', 90'; Mills (yellow card) 63'	Stadium: Checkatrade.com Stadium; Attendance: 2,315; Referee: Graham Salisbury

10 December 2016 20	Grimsby Town	0–1	Portsmouth	Cleethorpes
15:00 GMT	Gowling (yellow card) 51'; Berrett (yellow card) 85'	Report	Stevens (yellow card) 82'; Naismith 86'; Evans (yellow card) 90+3'	Stadium: Blundell Park; Attendance: 6,560; Referee: Andy Haines

17 December 2016 21	Doncaster Rovers	1–0	Grimsby Town	Doncaster
12:30 GMT	Mandeville 3'; Butler (yellow card) 45+1'	Report	Pearson (yellow card) 70'; Collins (yellow card) 86'; Berrett (yellow card) 89'	Stadium: Keepmoat Stadium; Attendance: 10,084; Referee: Richard Clark

26 December 2016 22	Grimsby Town	2–0	Accrington Stanley	Cleethorpes
15:00 GMT	Bolarinwa 32'; Bogle (yellow card) 50'; Andrew (yellow card) 68'; Chambers 88'	Report	O'Sullivan (yellow card) 62'; Pearson (yellow card) 81'	Stadium: Blundell Park; Attendance: 5,782; Referee: Ross Joyce

31 December 2016 23	Grimsby Town	0–0	Blackpool	Cleethorpes
15:00 GMT		Report	Osayi-Samuel (yellow card) 41'; Aldred (yellow card) 89'	Stadium: Blundell Park; Attendance: 5,637; Referee: Darren England

2 January 2017 24	Carlisle United	1–3	Grimsby Town	Carlisle
15:00 GMT	Wyke 31'	Report	Bogle 48', 74'; Yussuf 78'	Stadium: Brunton Park; Attendance: 6,865; Referee: David Webb

7 January 2017 25	Hartlepool United	0–1	Grimsby Town	Hartlepool
15:00 GMT	Featherstone (yellow card) 75'	Report	Yussuf 34'; Comley (yellow card) 82'; Bogle (yellow card) 90+3'	Stadium: The Northern Gas and Power Stadium; Attendance: 4,388; Referee: Darren Drysdale

14 January 2017 26	Grimsby Town	0–3	Exeter City	Cleethorpes
15:00 GMT	Collins (yellow card) 57'; Disley (yellow card) 66'	Report	James (yellow card) 15'; Watkins (yellow card) 28' (goal) 80'; Reid 41'; Wheeler 59'	Stadium: Blundell Park; Attendance: 5,009; Referee: Ben Toner

21 January 2017 27	Grimsby Town	2–0	Notts County	Cleethorpes
15:00 GMT	Bogle 27'; Clements (yellow card) 62'; Vernon 82'	Report	O'Connor (yellow card) 42'; Tootle (yellow card) 54'	Stadium: Blundell Park; Attendance: 5,421; Referee: Darren Handley

28 January 2017 28	Stevenage	2–0	Grimsby Town	Stevenage
15:00 GMT	Schumacher 4'; McAnuff 61'; Wilkinson (yellow card) 68'; McQuoid (yellow card) 82'	Report	Bogle (yellow card) 60'	Stadium: Broadhall Way; Attendance: 3,394; Referee: Brett Huxtable

4 February 2017 29	Grimsby Town	1–1	Luton Town	Cleethorpes
15:00 GMT	Clements 56'; Collins (yellow card) 64'; Comley (yellow card) 90+7'	Report	Vassell (yellow card) 36' (goal) 77'; Hylton (yellow card) 63'; Senior (yellow card) 76'	Stadium: Blundell Park; Attendance: 5,114; Referee: Mark Haywood

11 February 2017 30	Crewe Alexandra	5–0	Grimsby Town	Crewe
15:00 GMT	Cooper 2', 25' (yellow card) 62'; Dagnall 16', 29'; Cooke 87'; Nugent (yellow card) 90+3'	Report	Dyson (yellow card) 6'; Pearson (yellow card) 35'; Gunning (yellow card) 90+2'	Stadium: Alexandra Stadium; Attendance: 4,003; Referee: Kevin Johnson

14 February 2017 31	Newport County	0–0	Grimsby Town	Newport
19:45 GMT	Jones (yellow card) 72'	Report	Collins (yellow card) 7'; Dyson (yellow card) 19'; Yussuf (yellow card) 72'; Gunning (yellow card) 77'	Stadium: Rodney Parade; Attendance: 1,868; Referee: John Busby

18 February 2017 32	Grimsby Town	3–0	Mansfield Town	Cleethorpes
15:00 GMT	Clements 40'; Pearson (yellow card) 56'; Dyson 61', 73' (pen.); Gunning (yellow card) 70'	Report	White (yellow card) 11' (yellow-red card) 75'; Bennett (yellow card) 39'	Stadium: Blundell Park; Attendance: 5,550; Referee: Seb Stockbridge

25 February 2017 33	Morecambe	1–0	Grimsby Town	Morecambe
15:00 GMT	Molyneux 2'	Report	Gunning (yellow card) 72'	Stadium: Globe Arena; Attendance: 1,824; Referee: Darren Handley

28 February 2017 34	Grimsby Town	1–0	Colchester United	Cleethorpes
19:45 GMT	Jones 42'; Pearson (yellow card) 52'	Report	Garvan (yellow card) 71'; Murray (yellow card) 73'; Fosu (yellow card) 83'	Stadium: Blundell Park; Attendance: 4,186; Referee: Darren Drysdale

4 March 2017 35	Grimsby Town	1–2	Wycombe Wanderers	Cleethorpes
15:00 GMT	Dyson 17' (pen.); Clements (yellow card) 71'	Report	Wood (yellow card) 16'; Cowan-Hall (yellow card) 57' (goal) 71'; Collins 67' (o.g.); Southwell (yellow card) 90+4'	Stadium: Blundell Park; Attendance: 4,668; Referee: Nick Kinseley

11 March 2017 36	Leyton Orient	0–3	Grimsby Town	Leyton, London
15:00 GMT	Collins (yellow card) 63'; Koroma (yellow card) 90+3'	Report	Jones 7'; Mills (yellow card) 56'; Osborne (yellow card) 58'; Kennedy 71' (o.g.); Vernon 87'	Stadium: Brisbane Road; Attendance: 5,288; Referee: Lee Swabey

14 March 2017 37	Portsmouth	4–0	Grimsby Town	Portsmouth
19:45 GMT	Bennett 12'; Rose 35'; Baker 45+1'; Naismith 47'	Report		Stadium: Fratton Park; Attendance: 16,492; Referee: Robert Jones

18 March 2017 38	Grimsby Town	1–1	Crawley Town	Cleethorpes
15:00 GMT	Jones 22'; Collins (yellow card) 49' (yellow-red card) 81'; Pearson (yellow card) 83'	Report	Murphy 45+1'; Payne (yellow card) 80'	Stadium: Blundell Park; Attendance: 4,263; Referee: Carl Boyeson

25 March 2017 39	Accrington Stanley	1–1	Grimsby Town	Accrington
15:00 GMT	McConville 89'	Report	Asante 70'; Gunning (yellow card) 87'	Stadium: Crown Ground; Attendance: 2,312; Referee: Peter Gooch

1 April 2017 40	Grimsby Town	1–5	Doncaster Rovers	Cleethorpes
13:00 GMT	Clements (yellow card) 6'; Dyson (yellow card) 22'; Jones 34'; Mills (yellow card) 65'	Report	Marquis 37', 43', 61'; Williams (yellow card) 49' (goal) 78'; May 88'	Stadium: Blundell Park; Attendance: 6,821; Referee: Graham Scott

8 April 2017 41	Blackpool	1–3	Grimsby Town	Blackpool
15:00 BST	Boyce 43' (o.g.); Potts (yellow card) 86'; Black (yellow card) 89'; Aldred (yellow card) 90+1'	Report	Collins 17'; Jones 45+3', 70'; Gunning (yellow card) 86'	Stadium: Bloomfield Road; Attendance: 4,668; Referee: Darren Deadman

14 April 2017 42	Grimsby Town	2–1	Cambridge United	Cleethorpes
15:00 BST	Berrett (yellow card) 23'; Dyson 57' (pen.); Jones (yellow card) 66'; Clements 84'	Report	Halliday 90'	Stadium: Blundell Park; Attendance: 5,166; Referee: Andy Haines

17 April 2017 43	Cheltenham Town	2–1	Grimsby Town	Cheltenham
13:00 BST	Boyle 34'; Pell 39'; Brown (yellow card) 78'; Wright (yellow card) 89'	Report	Clements (yellow card) 64'; Berrett 73'; Gunning (red card) 79'; Collins (yellow card) 90+6'	Stadium: Whaddon Road; Referee: Mark Heywood

22 April 2017 44	Grimsby Town	4–2	Yeovil Town	Cleethorpes
15:00 BST	Jones 6' (pen.); Clements 36'; Vernon 59'; Osborne 62'	Report	Lawless 47'; Zoko 75'	Stadium: Blundell Park; Attendance: 4,061; Referee: Eddie Ilderton

29 April 2017 45	Barnet	3–1	Grimsby Town	Canons Park, London
15:00 BST	Akinde 21'; Tutonda 40'; Weston 53'	Report	Clements (yellow card) 52'; Disley (yellow card) 71' (goal) 74'; Bolarinwa (yellow card) 90'	Stadium: The Hive Stadium; Attendance: 3,247; Referee: Seb Stockbridge

6 May 2017 46	Grimsby Town	1–1	Plymouth Argyle	Cleethorpes
17:30 BST	Pearson 2' (yellow card) 79'; Disley (yellow card) 54'; Jones (yellow card) 75'; Dyson (yellow card) 90+2'	Report	Spencer 61'; Fox (yellow card) 76'	Stadium: Blundell Park; Attendance: 6,866; Referee: Ross Joyce

=== FA Cup ===
5 November 2016 First round	Bolton Wanderers	1–0	Grimsby Town	Bolton
15:00 GMT	Trotter 20'; Proctor (yellow card) 55'; Taylor (yellow card) 83'	Report	Andrew (yellow card) 22'; Gowling (yellow card) 80'; Bogle (yellow card) 81'	Stadium: Macron Stadium; Attendance: 6,649; Referee: Trevor Kettle

=== EFL Cup ===
9 August 2016 First round	Derby County	1–0	Grimsby Town	Derby
19:45 BST	Pearce (yellow card) 25'; Keogh 60'	Report		Stadium: Pride Park Stadium; Attendance: 11,692; Referee: Ben Toner

=== EFL Trophy ===
Pos	Div	Team	Pld	W	PW	PL	L	GF	GA	GD	Pts	Qualification
1	L1	Walsall	3	3	0	0	0	8	3	+5	9	Advance to Round 2
2	ACA	Leicester City U21	3	1	1	0	1	1	1	0	5	Advance to Round 2
3	L1	Sheffield United	3	1	0	1	1	5	4	+1	4	
4	L2	Grimsby Town	3	0	0	0	3	4	10	−6	0	

Source: Sky Sports

30 August 2016 Group stage 1	Walsall	5–2	Grimsby Town	Bescot
19:45 BST	Bakayoko 18', 39', 43'; Morris 61'; Kouhyar 71'; Preston (yellow card) 90'		Boyce 5'; Summerfield 67'; Andrew (yellow card) 67'	Stadium: Bescot Stadium

4 October 2016 Group stage 2	Grimsby Town	0–1	Leicester City U23	Cleethorpes
19:45 BST	McKeown (red card) 16'; Gowling (yellow card) 24'	Report	Domej (yellow card) 30'; Mitchell 64'	Stadium: Blundell Park; Attendance: 609; Referee: Mark Haywood

9 November 2016 Group stage 3	Grimsby Town	2–4	Sheffield United	Cleethorpes
19:45 GMT	Jackson 14'; Boyce (yellow card) 63'; Disley 81'	Report	Slater 53' (yellow card) 59'; Basham (yellow card) 60'; Boyce 74' (o.g.); O'Connell 78'; Clarke 87'	Stadium: Blundell Park; Attendance: 597; Referee: Richard Clark
