= Calum Dyson =

English footballer

Personal information
- Full name: Calum William Dyson
- Date of birth: 19 September 1996 (age 30)
- Place of birth: Fazakerley, Liverpool England
- Height: 1.87 m (6 ft 1 1/2 in)
- Position: Striker

Youth career
- 2003–2015: Everton

Senior career*
Years	Team	Apps	(Gls)
2015–2018	Everton	0	(0)
2015	→ Stockport County (loan)	8	(3)
2015	→ Chester (loan)	4	(0)
2017	→ Grimsby Town (loan)	16	(4)
2018–2019	Plymouth Argyle	0	(0)
2019	→ Stevenage (loan)	0	(0)
Total		28	(7)
- * Club domestic league appearances and goals

Calum William Dyson (born 19 September 1996) is an English former professional footballer who played as a striker.

Dyson began his career at Everton and spent loan spells at Stockport County, Chester and Grimsby Town. He moved to Plymouth Argyle in June 2018, and later spent time out on loan to Stevenage. He retired in October 2019 due to injury, aged 23.

== Club career ==
=== Everton ===
Born in Fazakerley, Dyson joined Everton at the age of six and progressed through the youth ranks. Along the way, Dyson grew up with Conor Grant and played together in Everton youth ranks. He also said about his position: "I would say my main position is a central striker but throughout the years at Everton I have played on the left, coming in at the back post. In my youth team days I have played on the right, so anywhere across the front three really. I have learnt all three roles and wherever the gaffer puts me in the team I will give 100 per cent." In May 2014, he helped the side win the Under-18 Premier League title in the 2013–14 season. In July 2014, Dyson turned professional when he signed a two–year contract.

During his development in hopes of breaking through the first team, Dyson continued to feature for the U18 and U23 sides, under manager David Unsworth. At the end of the 2015–16 season, he signed a contract extension with the club.

In the 2016–17 season, Dyson started and scored his first goal in the tournament, in a 2–0 win over Bolton Wanderers in the Group Stage of EFL Trophy. He went on to feature two more matches in the Group Stage of EFL Trophy, as they went on to lose two of those matches and eliminated from the tournament. At the end of the 2016–17 season, he signed another contract extension with the club. After his 2017–18 season was overshadowed by injuries, Dyson was released by the club.

==== Loan spells from Everton ====
On 6 August 2015, Dyson was first loaned out when he spent a loan spell in non-league with Stockport County on a youth loan. He made his Stockport County debut, where he started and played 68 minutes, in a 2–1 win over Boston United in the opening game of the season. On 11 August 2015, Dyson scored his first goal for the club, in a 2–1 win over F.C. United of Manchester. He later scored two more goals for the side against AFC Telford United and AFC Fylde. He went on to make eight appearances and scoring 3 times before returning to his parent club in early–September.

On 9 November 2015, Dyson re–joined Chester on a month's loan. The next day, he made his Chester debut, where he came on as a substitute for James Roberts, in a 3–1 win over Kidderminster Harriers. Dyson went on to make four appearances for the side before returning to his parent club in December.

Dyson signed on loan for Grimsby Town on 31 January 2017 for the rest of the season. He made his Grimsby Town debut, where he started and played 84 minutes before being substituted, in a 1–1 draw against Luton Town on 4 February 2017. Two weeks later on 18 February 2017, Dyson scored his first goals, in a 3–0 win over Mansfield Town. He scored again two weeks later on 4 March 2017, in a 2–1 loss against Wycombe Wanderers. Dyson became a first team regular at Grimsby Town and impressed for the side that he won Grimsby's Young Player of the Year award at the end of the season. He went on to make 16 appearances and scoring 4 times for the side.

=== Plymouth Argyle ===
On 11 June 2018, Dyson signed for Plymouth Argyle, then of League One, on a free transfer after being released by Everton. He was previously linked with the club on a loan move the previous year, but the move never materialised.

On 31 January 2019, he joined League Two side Stevenage on loan until the end of the season, but never made any appearances for The Boro after a persistent ankle injury. The injury kept him out for the full season.

Having failed to recover from his ankle injury, Dyson announced his retirement from playing in October 2019, aged 23.

== Career statistics ==
As of 1 July 2019

Appearances and goals by club, season and competition
Club	Season	League			FA Cup		League Cup		Other		Total	
Club	Season	Division	Apps	Goals	Apps	Goals	Apps	Goals	Apps	Goals	Apps	Goals
Everton U21	2016–17	—			—		—		3 (Note: Appearances in EFL Trophy)	1	3	1
Everton	2015–16	Premier League	0	0	0	0	0	0	—		0	0
Everton	2016–17	Premier League	0	0	0	0	0	0	—		0	0
Everton	2017–18	Premier League	0	0	0	0	0	0	—		0	0
Everton	Total		0	0	0	0	0	0	0	0	0	0
Stockport County (loan)	2015–16	National League North	8	3	0	0	—		0	0	8	3
Chester (loan)	2015–16	National League	4	0	0	0	—		0	0	4	0
Grimsby Town (loan)	2016–17	League Two	16	4	0	0	0	0	0	0	16	4
Plymouth Argyle	2018–19	League One	0	0	0	0	0	0	2	0	2	0
Plymouth Argyle	2019–20	League Two	0	0	0	0	0	0	0	0	0	0
Plymouth Argyle	Total		0	0	0	0	0	0	2	0	2	0
Stevenage (loan)	2018–19	League Two	0	0	0	0	0	0	0	0	0	0
Career total			28	7	0	0	0	0	5	1	33	8

== Honours ==
Grimsby Town

- 2016–17 Young Player of the Year
