= Tom Bolarinwa =

English footballer (born 1990)

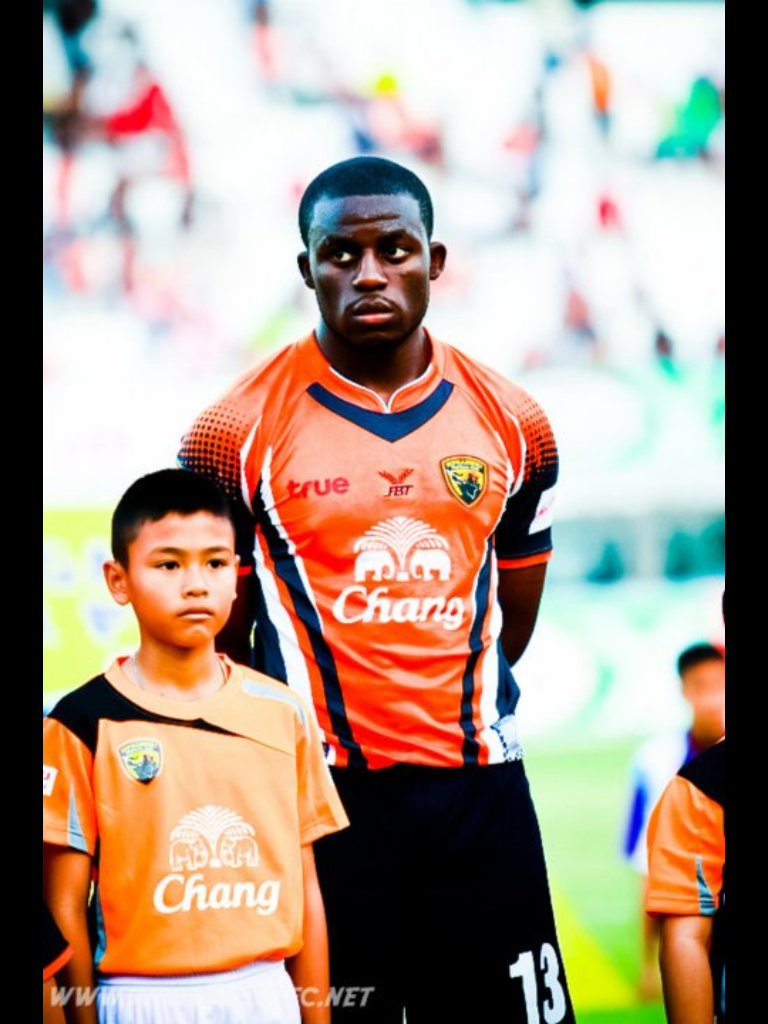

Personal information
- Full name: Oluwasheun Ayotomiwa A. Bolarinwa
- Date of birth: 21 January 1990 (age 36)
- Place of birth: Greenwich, England
- Height: 5 ft 11 in (1.80 m)
- Positions: Winger; attacking midfielder

Youth career
- 2006–2007: Barnet
- 2007–2008: Croydon Athletic

Senior career*
Years	Team	Apps	(Gls)
2008	Dulwich Hamlet	6	(4)
2008–2010	Croydon Athletic	40	(13)
2010	Billericay Town	10	(5)
2010–2011	Kingstonian	10	(0)
2011–2014	Muangthong United	0	(0)
2011	→ Suphanburi (loan)	15	(8)
2012	→ Bangkok (loan)		
2013	→ Nonthaburi (loan)		
2013	→ Nakhon Nayok (loan)	9	(1)
2014	→ Udon Thani (loan)	21	(7)
2015	Cray Wanderers	7	(1)
2015–2016	Sutton United	37	(11)
2016–2018	Grimsby Town	37	(2)
2017–2018	→ Sutton United (loan)	10	(2)
2018–2020	Sutton United	68	(6)
2020	Beckenham Town		
2020–2021	Lewes		
2021–2022	Ashford United	3	(0)
2022	South Park		
2022	Cray Wanderers		
- * Club domestic league appearances and goals as of 16:32, 26 September 2020 (UTC)

Oluwasheun Ayotomiwa A. "Tom" Bolarinwa (born 21 January 1990) is an English former professional footballer who played as a winger.

Primarily playing on the right-wing, he began his career at Barnet in 2006 where he was a youth trainee in the academy. He then switched to Croydon Athletic playing in their youth team for a season. A brief spell with Dulwich Hamlet, before playing two seasons back at Croydon where he helped them win promotion as champions. He then played ten games for Billericay Town and Kingstonian.

After a trial period with Wycombe Wanderers, he made a switch to Thailand, joining Thai Division 1 Club, Suphanburi, in his first season he made 15 appearances and scored 8 goals; further spells in the Thai divisions with Bangkok, Nakhon Nayok and Udon Thani where helped them attain second-place and qualification into the champions league.

After spending three years in the Thai leagues, Bolarinwa moved back to England where he spent the closing weeks of the 2014–15 season at Cray Wanderers, before a move to National League South side Sutton United. He was pivotal to the club being promoted as champions with a number of man of the match performances and amassing 11 goals in the league and 15 total. His impressive form led to him earning a move to newly promoted League Two side Grimsby Town.

== Club career ==
Bolarinwa was born in Greenwich, London. He started his football career in the Youth Alliance League with Barnet then went on to play senior football at Dulwich Hamlet making 6 appearances and scoring 4 goals. In 2008, he joined Croydon Athletic, as a right midfielder where he was in the winning team that won the Ryman Division 1 for the first time in their history. During his time with Croydon Athletic he made 40 appearances, scoring 13 goals. In September 2010 Bolarinwa spent a short spell at Billericay Town where he made 10 appearances, scoring 5 goals, before being released in November 2010. He then had a spell at Kingstonian where he made 10 appearances.

=== Thai Leagues ===
After a trial period with Wycombe Wanderers, Bolarinwa joined Thai League 1 club, Muangthong United and was then loaned out to Suphanburi. In his first season, he made 15 appearances and scored 8 goals. In 2013, he played for Regional League Division 2 side Nakhon Nayok, he made 9 appearances and scored one goal. In 2014 Bolarinwa joined Udon Thani where he made 21 appearances and scored 7 goals, helping them finish in second place and qualification to the Champions League Round.

=== Sutton United ===
Bolarinwa spent a few weeks with Isthmian League Division One North side Cray Wanderers. They won every game in which he played, making what had seemed an unlikely escape from relegation. Bolarinwa then signed a two-year contract with National League South side Sutton United on a free transfer. He made he debut for the club, coming off the bench in the 2–0 home defeat to Maidstone United. Bolarinwa scored his first goal for the club on 19 September 2015 in the 2–0 away win at Weston-super-Mare, scoring the second goal in the 30th minute, a pass fed into the path of Bolarinwa midway in the Weston half from Craig Eastmond, Bolarinwa ran forward dinking inside and outside to avoid two challenges before striking a 25-yard low shot, which curled away from the out-stretched dive of Purnell into the far bottom corner of the net.

Bolarinwa played a crucial role in Sutton United being promoted to the National League for the first time in sixteen years. His efforts over the season earned him a place in the 2015–16 National League team of the year.

=== Grimsby Town ===
Bolarinwa joined League Two side Grimsby Town on 15 June 2016 on a three-year contract for an undisclosed fee. He made his debut on 6 August 2016 in the opening game of the 2016–17 season in Grimsby's 2–0 home victory against Morecambe.

In November 2017, Bolarinwa returned to Sutton United on loan.

=== Return to Non-League ===
On 9 January 2018 Bolarinwa returned to Sutton United on a permanent deal. After two and a half seasons, he left the club on the expiry of his contract on 30 June 2020.

Bolarinwa joined Lewes in September 2020.

At the beginning of the 2021–22 season, Bolarinwa moved to Ashford United.

== Style of play ==
Bolarinwa primarily plays as a winger, but he can also play behind a striker as an attacking midfielder, as well as both flanks. A very direct type of player, he is able to dribble at pace and use feints to get past the opponents players, and he is able to hold the ball up to bring other players into play.

== Career statistics ==
As of match played on 20 January 2018.

Appearances and goals by club, season and competition
Club	Season	League			FA Cup		League Cup		Other		Total	
Club	Season	Division	Apps	Goals	Apps	Goals	Apps	Goals	Apps	Goals	Apps	Goals
Sutton United	2015–16	National League South	37	11	1	0	—		3 (Note: Appearance(s) in FA Trophy)	0	41	11
Sutton United	Total		37	11	1	0	—		3	0	41	11
Grimsby Town	2016–17	League Two	34	2	1	0	1	0	3 (Note: Appearance(s) in Football League Trophy)	0	39	2
Grimsby Town	2017–18	League Two	3	0	0	0	1	0	2	0	6	0
Grimsby Town	Total		37	2	1	0	2	0	5	0	45	2
Sutton United (loan)	2017–18	National League	11	3	0	0	0	0	0	0	11	3
Career total			85	16	2	0	2	0	8	0	97	16

== Personal life ==
Bolarinwa has a younger brother, winger/right-back Moses Odubajo, who plays for Queens Park Rangers. Both are eligible to play for England or Nigeria respectively as they are of Nigerian descent. Bolarinwa was orphaned at the age of 15 when his mother died of malaria and from that age he lived alone with his younger brother.

== Honours ==
=== Player ===
Croydon Athletic

- Isthmian League Division One South champions: 2009–10

Udon Thani

- Division 2 North Eastern second-place(Q): 2014

Sutton United

- National League South champions: 2015–16

=== Individual ===
- National League South Team of the Year: 2015–16
