= Jamey Osborne =

English footballer (born 1992)

Personal information
- Full name: Jamey Ray Osborne
- Date of birth: 7 June 1992 (age 34)
- Place of birth: Solihull, England
- Position: Attacking midfielder

Team information
- Current team: Alvechurch

Youth career
- 2008–2009: Hednesford Town

Senior career*
Years	Team	Apps	(Gls)
2009–2015	Hednesford Town	160	(21)
2011	→ Rushall Olympic (loan)	1	(0)
2015–2016	Redditch United	26	(4)
2016–2017	Solihull Moors	22	(3)
2017–2018	Grimsby Town	21	(1)
2017–2018	→ Solihull Moors (loan)	6	(0)
2018–2026	Solihull Moors	265	(28)
2026–	Alvechurch	0	(0)
- * Club domestic league appearances and goals as of 12 August 2026

Jamey Ray Osborne (born 7 June 1992) is an English footballer who plays as a midfielder for Southern League Premier Division Central club Alvechurch.

Osborne began his career at Hednesford Town in 2008 where he started as a youngster and established himself in the "Pitmen's" first team in the 2009–10 season, he spent the next 4 1/2 years there. He then joined Redditch United in 2015 before moving to his hometown club Solihull Moors for the start of the 2016–2017 season.

== Career ==
=== Hednesford Town ===
Osborne was born in Solihull, West Midlands. He began his career with Hednesford Town as a member of the club's youth system in the under-18s team. He scored on his full debut in a 3–0 win at Didcot Town, running at pace took him away from his marker, making just enough space for him to strike a breathtaking curling shot from fully thirty yards that swerved past the goalkeeper and into the top far corner of the net.

Osborne joined Evo-Stik Division One Rushall Olympic on a month's loan in February 2011. He was part of the Hednesford side that were promoted in the play-off final 2–1 victory over F.C. United of Manchester, Osborne scoring what turned out to the winning goal. He was part of the team that won the Staffordshire Senior Cup trophy in April 2013 for the first time since 1974, with a man of the match performance in the final, scoring two goals in five minutes after the hour mark in their 5–1 victory over Rushall Olympic. His performances over the 2013–2014 season rewarded him with the Supporters Player of the Year award.

=== Redditch United ===
Despite attracting League Two interest from the likes of Crawley Town, Notts County and Crewe Alexandra where he spent time training towards the end of last season but suffered a dislocated shoulder injury; he moved to Southern League Premier Division side Redditch United for the duration of the 2015–2016 season. An approach by former Hednesford manager Rob Smith at AFC Telford United was made in February 2016, however, he decided to stay at Redditch who were mounting a promotion bid from the Southern Premier League. On 25 January 2016, he scored the winning goal in the quarter-final of the Birmingham Senior Cup, a 20-yard strike in the 63rd minute from the left-hand corner of the area flew into the far top corner.

=== Solihull Moors ===
The following season in May 2016, he moved to newly promoted National League side Solihull Moors. Before the season started however, he had another trial at Crewe. He scored a brace in the FA Cup second round against Luton Town; in the first five minutes turning on the edge of the box and curled a strike into the top corner, his second came on 35 minutes, good work at the byline by Akwasi Asante who was able pick out a pass to Osborne free at edge of the box who fired a low shot into the bottom corner.

=== Grimsby Town ===
Grimsby Town's initial bids were rejected by Solihull, due to falling below Solihull's valuation. However, on 18 January 2017, Osborne signed a 2 1/2-year deal with the newly promoted League Two club for an undisclosed fee. He made his professional debut with Grimsby in the 2–0 home win over Notts County; he provided the assist for the opening goal, his initial cross turned away, then from the byline Osborne cut the ball across the penalty area for Omar Bogle to turn home; Osborne was also involved in the buildup to the second goal, placing a through ball to Bogle on the right hand side of the box, with the goalkeeper deflecting into the path of Scott Vernon who slotted home from an acute angle. His performance earning him the Man of the Match award and he was also named in Sky Bets EFL: Team of the Week for the month of January 2017.

In July 2017, Osborne ruptured his posterior cruciate ligament, ruling him out for the next five months. On 8 November 2017, Osborne made his comeback in a 1–1 draw against Sunderland U21s in the EFL Trophy.

=== Return to Solihull Moors ===
On 1 December 2017, Osborne rejoined Solihull Moors on a 28-day loan. He signed on a permanent deal on 8 January 2018, for an undisclosed fee.

In August 2026, after eight seasons with the Moors, he departed the club.

=== Alvechurch ===
On 11 August 2026, Osborne joined Southern League Premier Division Central club Alvechurch.

== Style of play ==
Osborne is a skilful box to box midfielder, he is not afraid to put in a tackle when needed, but this has got him a few bookings on occasions. Going forward, he likes to run at defenders, creating chances for the forwards by dribbling and winning free kicks and penalties by diving. Osborne likes to get the ball down and bring the full backs into the game and switch the play.

== Personal life ==
Osborne is a supporter of Aston Villa.

== Career statistics ==
As of end of 2017–18 season

Appearances and goals by club, season and competition
Club	Season	League			FA Cup		League Cup		Other		Total	
Club	Season	Division	Apps	Goals	Apps	Goals	Apps	Goals	Apps	Goals	Apps	Goals
Hednesford Town	2009–10	SFL Premier Division	0	0	0	0	—		0	0	0	0
Hednesford Town	2010–11	SFL Premier Division	19	2	2	0	—		2 (Note: Appearances in Chase Cup)	0	23	2
Hednesford Town	2011–12	NPL Premier Division	32	3	3	0	—		3 (Note: Two appearances in FA Trophy, one in NPL Premier Division play-offs)	0	38	3
Hednesford Town	2012–13	NPL Premier Division	39	2	2	0	—		6 (Note: Four appearances and one goal in FA Trophy, two appearances and one goal in NPL Premier Division play-offs)	2	47	4
Hednesford Town	2013–14	Conference North	31	9	2	0	—		1 (Note: Appearance in FA Trophy)	0	34	9
Hednesford Town	2014–15	Conference North	39	5	0	0	—		0	0	39	5
Hednesford Town	Total		160	21	9	0	—		12	2	181	23
Rushall Olympic (loan)
Rushall Olympic (loan)	2010–11	NPL Division One South	1	0	—		—		—		1	0
Redditch United
Redditch United	2015–16	SFL Premier Division	?	4	?	0	—		3 (Note: Appearance and one goal in Birmingham Senior Cup, two appearances in Worcestershire Senior Cup)	1	3	5
Solihull Moors
Solihull Moors	2016–17	National League	22	3	4	2	—		1	0	27	5
Grimsby Town
Grimsby Town	2016–17	League Two	19	1	0	0	0	0	0	0	19	1
Grimsby Town	2017–18	League Two	2	0	0	0	0	0	1 (Note: Appearance(s) in EFL Trophy)	0	3	0
Grimsby Town	Total		21	1	0	0	0	0	1	0	22	1
Solihull Moors (loan)
Solihull Moors (loan)	2017–18	National League	6	0	0	0	—		1	1	7	1
Solihull Moors
Solihull Moors	2017–18	National League	16	2	0	0	—		1	0	17	2
Career total			226	31	13	2	0	0	19	4	258	37

== Honours ==
Hednesford Town

- Northern Premier League play-offs: 2013
- Staffordshire Senior Cup: 2012–13
- Birmingham Senior Cup: 2012–13

Solihull Moors

- FA Trophy runner-up: 2023–24

Individual

- Hednesford Town Supporters Player of the Year: 2013–14
- Solihull Moors Players' Player of the Year (joint): 2018–19
- National League Team of the Year: 2018–19
