= Brandon Robinson (footballer) =

Dutch footballer

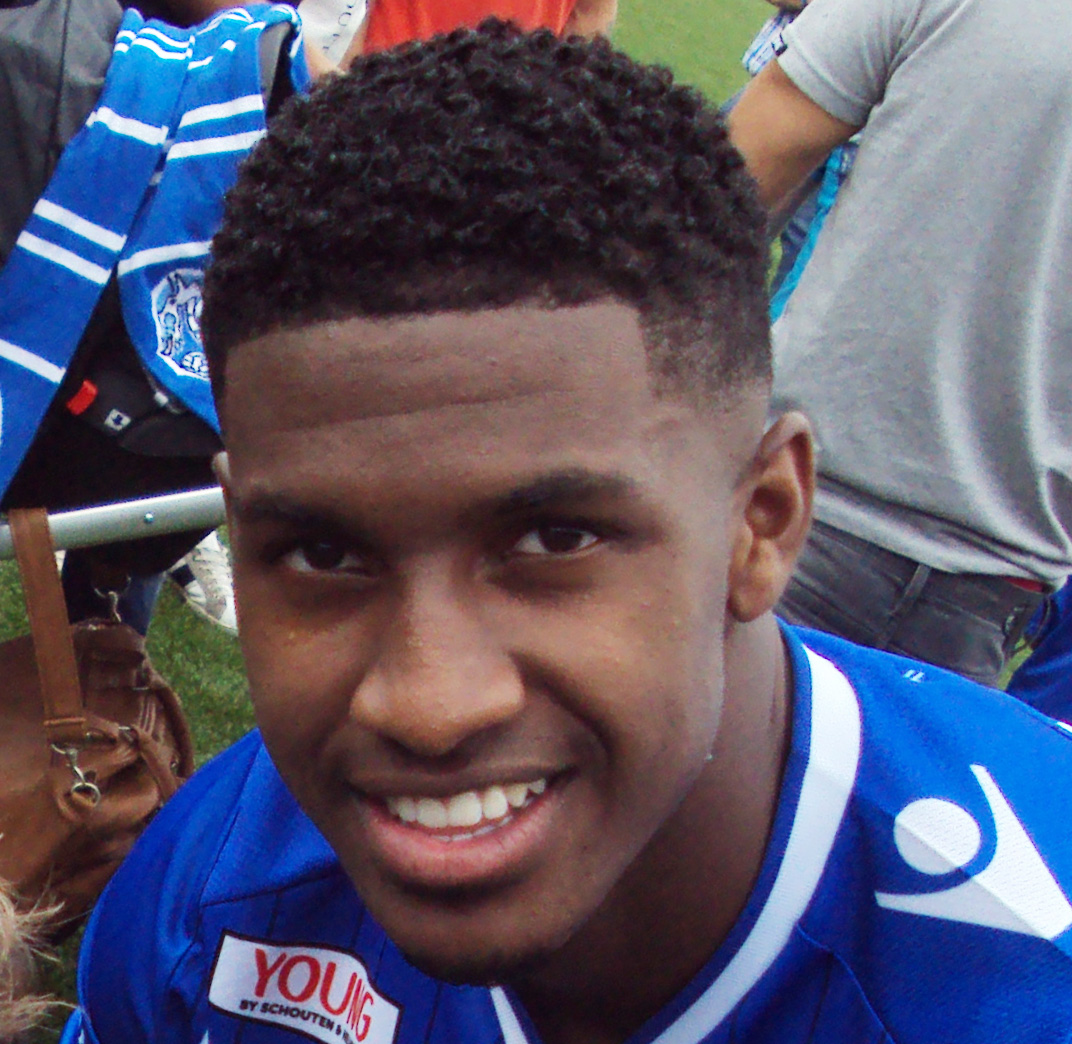
- Robinson with Den Bosch in 2016

Personal information
- Date of birth: 25 February 1995 (age 31)
- Place of birth: Vlaardingen, Netherlands
- Height: 1.82 m (6 ft 0 in)
- Position: Forward

Youth career
- 2001–2006: XerxesDZB
- 2006–2014: Feyenoord

Senior career*
Years	Team	Apps	(Gls)
2014–2016	NAC Breda	4	(0)
2016–2017	Den Bosch	23	(1)
2017–2019	Scheveningen	63	(18)
2019–2021	Katwijk	21	(1)
2021–2022	Excelsior Maassluis	16	(0)
2022–2023	ASWH	18	(1)
- * Club domestic league appearances and goals as of 26 January 2026

Brandon Robinson (born 25 February 1995) is a Dutch professional footballer who plays as a forward. He has previously played for Den Bosch and NAC Breda.

== Career ==
Rotterdam-born Robinson began his professional career in 2014 when he signed terms with NAC Breda, after being let go by Feyenoord as a youngster. He would go on to make only 4 appearances over two seasons before being released in the summer of 2016. He signed a one-year deal with FC Den Bosch playing 24 times and scoring once during the 2016–17 season.

On 12 July 2017 he joined English League Two side Grimsby Town on trial, scoring in a 4-0 friendly victory against Scunthorpe United before netting the winner in a 2–1 victory against Barnsley.

He signed with SVV Scheveningen in September 2017. In March 2019, he moved to VV Katwijk. In 2021, he joined the ranks of Excelsior Maassluis and in 2022, ASWH. On Wednesday, 21 September 2022, Robonson scored and equalizer against Kozakken Boys in the national cup. ASWH still lost.
