= Shaun Pearson =

English footballer (born 1989)

Personal information
- Full name: Shaun Mark Pearson
- Date of birth: 28 April 1989 (age 37)
- Place of birth: York, England
- Height: 6 ft 0 in (1.83 m)
- Position: Centre-back

Team information
- Current team: Lincoln City (first team coach)

Youth career
- Spalding United

Senior career*
Years	Team	Apps	(Gls)
2006–2008	Spalding United		
2008–2009	Stamford		
2009–2011	Boston United	67	(17)
2011–2017	Grimsby Town	207	(11)
2017–2021	Wrexham	132	(12)
2021–2023	Grimsby Town	28	(1)
2022–2023	→ Boston United (loan)	5	(0)
Total		462+	(42+)

Managerial career
- 2023: Grimsby Town (joint caretaker)
- * Club domestic league appearances and goals

Shaun Mark Pearson (born 28 April 1989) is an English football coach and former player who is currently a first team coach of EFL Championship side Lincoln City.

Pearson was a centre-back who began his career at non-League side Spalding United in 2006 before moving to Stamford in 2008. A year later he moved up the football pyramid again by signing for Boston United where he enjoyed two seasons, earning promotion to the Conference North. In the summer of 2011 he joined Grimsby Town where he has picked up two Lincolnshire Senior Cup honours and a runners-up medal in the 2013 FA Trophy final as well as earning promotion to the Football League before joining Wrexham in 2017. He rejoined Grimsby and once again was part of a team who earned promotion back to the Football League. In his final season as a player he spent a month back on loan with Boston United eleven years after last playing for the club.

== Club career ==
=== Early life and early career ===
Shaun Mark Pearson was born on 28 April 1989 in York, North Yorkshire. He attended Woodthorpe Primary School, before moving to Norfolk with his family aged 11. Between 2005 and 2007 he studied Sports at Easton College, Norwich. He began his career with United Counties Football League side Spalding United. His appearances during the 2007–08 season earned him the Supporters Player of the Season award, which captured the attention of local rivals Stamford. In his only season with The Daniels he went on to clinch a similar award to the one he had achieved with Spalding the previous season.

=== Boston United ===
In the summer of 2009, Pearson made a second move in two seasons by joining Northern Premier League Premier Division side Boston United on 8 July 2009. Pearson became one of the club's favoured centre halves in the plans of management duo Rob Scott and Paul Hurst. At the end of the season Pearson and Boston earned promotion to the Conference North division after beating Bradford Park Avenue in the play-off final. During the course of the 2010–11 season United's management duo had departed to take over from Neil Woods at Grimsby Town and speculation mounted that Pearson would be joining his former mentors at Blundell Park, Pearson was quick to quash the rumours saying that although he wanted to become a professional footballer he wanted to do it with Boston and was hopeful he could aid the club's promotion bid to the Conference Premier. The rumour had also unsettled Boston chairman David Newton who said his main aim was to keep Pearson at York Street following two outstanding seasons. After failing to earn promotion with United, Pearson admitted he could be about to join Scott and Hurst at Grimsby. His time at Boston brought 17 goals in 67 league appearances, Pearson was also handed the Supporters Player of the Season award in both of his seasons at York Street.

=== Grimsby Town ===
On 27 June 2011 Grimsby made an official bid for Pearson that was rejected by Boston for being "way too low" under what the club had wanted for the player. Eventually Pearson became a Grimsby player with The Mariners also recruiting fellow Boston player Anthony Church. Both moves caused issues between the two clubs and a court tribunal had to be set in November 2011 to settle the compensation Grimsby would have to pay Boston for both players. No sooner than a month into his career at Grimsby, he had fetched his first trophy for the club in helping Town lift the Lincolnshire Senior Cup after beating Lincoln City at Sincil Bank. Pearson made his professional debut for The Mariners in a 5–0 defeat against Braintree Town. He would wait until 20 March 2012 before he finally netted his first goal for The Mariners in a 2–1 victory away at Hayes & Yeading United. Pearson's goal turned out to be the winner as he scored a "thumping header" from a Peter Winn cross in the 56th minute. On 9 April 2012 Pearson scored both goals in a 2–0 win over Gateshead, the first a header and the second he managed to turn the ball over the line after his initial header had been cleared off the line. He ended the season having scored 3 goals in 33 appearances.

Pearson continued his form and run in the team initially partnering Fleetwood Town loanee Nathan Pond for the first half of the 2012–13 season. The club had already defended the Lincolnshire Senior Cup by yet again beating local rivals Lincoln City on a penalty shootout at Sincil Bank. The new season for The Mariners saw them race ahead in the league with Wrexham and Newport County. His first goal of the season came on 1 September 2012 in a 2–0 win away at Hereford United. The club also went on a healthy run in the FA Trophy and after defeating Dartford over two legs in the semi-final they met Wrexham in the final at Wembley Stadium, but even with Pearson shaking off an injury to play, Town suffered a 4–1 defeat on penalties after the game had ended 1–1 after normal time. Pearson scored his second goal of the season on 3 April 2013 in a 3–1 win over Macclesfield Town, the win help aided Town's promotion push, that was eventually halted when they lost over two legs to Newport County in the play-off semi-finals.

Ahead of the 2013–14 season Pearson put pen to paper on a new one-year contract, with the player saying Blundell Park was the best place to be for his development. He played in the 2015 Conference Premier play-off final against Bristol Rovers at Wembley on 17 May 2015; following a 1–1 draw after extra time, Grimsby lost 5–3 in a penalty shoot-out.

Ahead of the 2015–16 season, having made 146 league appearances for the club, Pearson put pen to paper on a new two-year contract. A number of sides were chasing his signature, Pearson said: "I COULD have gone elsewhere for more money, but I've loved every minute of my time here and I couldn't see myself anywhere else."

Pearson played in Grimsby's 3–1 victory over Forest Green Rovers in the 2016 National League play-off final at Wembley, seeing Grimsby promoted to League Two after a six-year absence from the Football League.

He made his League Two debut with the club on 6 August 2016 in the opening game of the 2016–17 season in Grimsby's 2–0 home victory against Morecambe. After making 38 appearances and scoring two goals for Grimsby in the 2016–17 season he was released by the club on 18 May 2017.

=== Wrexham ===
On 19 May 2017, Pearson signed for National League side Wrexham on a two-year contract.

During the COVID-19 pandemic, all of Wrexham's players were furloughed and Pearson worked as a pizza delivery driver and night shifts at Tesco.

=== Return to Grimsby Town ===
On 4 June 2021, Pearson re-signed for National League side Grimsby Town on a two-year contract.

Grimsby secured promotion with victory in the play-off final, though Pearson was an unused substitute at the London Stadium.

On 2 December 2022, Pearson rejoined former club Boston United on a one-month loan.

Grimsby Town announced that Pearson would be retiring from professional football at the end of the 2022–23 season, with the game against AFC Wimbledon on 8 May 2023 spelling the end of his career. The club announced Pearson would be remaining with the club and would be part of Paul Hurst's back room staff. Upon retiring, Hollywood actor and Wrexham co-owner Ryan Reynolds described Pearson as "one of the best".

== International career ==
In August 2011, Pearson was called up to the England national C team to face the India under-23 team. However, the match was called off and Pearson remained uncapped for England C.

== Coaching career ==
Following his retirement at the end of the 2022–23 season, Grimsby manager Paul Hurst explained Pearson would be remaining with the club as part of his backroom staff. Hurst went on to say that Pearson had already began this work and had been helping with scouting reports and academy coaching.

On 29 October 2023, Pearson and Ben Davies were appointed joint-caretaker managers following the dismissal of Paul Hurst and assistant manager Chris Doig.

On 5 August 2026, Grimsby announced that Pearson had left his position of assistant head coach at the club to "spend some valuable time with his family before exploring the next step in his coaching career".

In September 2026, he joined Championship club Lincoln City as a first team coach.

== Personal life ==
Pearson is a supporter of his hometown club York City.

It was announced that Pearson would represent former club Wrexham in The Soccer Tournament, a seven-a-side football tournament in North Carolina between 1 and 2 June 2023, with the winning team looking to win a $1 million prize. Pearson planned to feature alongside former teammates Paul Rutherford, Mark Carrington and David Jones. Reynolds announced that if his team are successful, the money would be donated to local projects in Wrexham.

== Career statistics ==
Appearances and goals by club, season and competition
Club	Season	League			FA Cup		League Cup		Other		Total	
Club	Season	Division	Apps	Goals	Apps	Goals	Apps	Goals	Apps	Goals	Apps	Goals
Boston United	2010–11	Conference North	34	11	0	0	–		1	0	35	11
Grimsby Town	2011–12	Conference Premier	30	3	3	0	–		3	0	39	3
Grimsby Town	2012–13	Conference Premier	36	2	0	0	-		8	1	44	3
Grimsby Town	2013–14	Conference Premier	41	2	5	2	-		3	1	49	5
Grimsby Town	2014–15	Conference Premier	45	4	2	1	-		3	0	50	5
Grimsby Town	2015–16	National League	31	0	2	0	-		8	0	41	0
Grimsby Town	2016–17	League Two	34	2	0	0	1	0	3	0	38	2
Grimsby Town	Total		217	13	12	3	1	0	28	2	261	18
Wrexham	2017–18	National League	45	5	0	0	–		0	0	45	5
Wrexham	2018–19	National League	41	6	4	0	–		1 (Note: Appearance(s) in the National League play-offs)	0	46	6
Wrexham	2019–20	National League	31	0	3	0	–		0	0	34	0
Wrexham	2020–21	National League	1	0	0	0	–		1	0	2	0
Wrexham	Total		118	11	7	0	0	0	2	0	127	11
Total			368	25	19	3	1	0	31	2	428	42

== Honours ==
=== As a player ===
Boston United

- Northern Premier League Premier Division play-offs: 2010
- Lincolnshire Senior Cup: 2009–10

Grimsby Town

- National League play-offs: 2016, 2022
- FA Trophy runner-up: 2012–13, 2015–16
- Lincolnshire Senior Cup: 2011–12, 2012–13, 2014–15

Individual

- Spalding United Supporters Player of the Season: 2007–08
- Stamford Supporters Player of the Season: 2008–09
- Boston United Supporters Player of the Season: 2009–10, 2010–11
- Conference Premier Team of the Year: 2013–14, 2014–15
- Wrexham Player of the Year: 2017–18
- National League Team of the Year: 2017–18, 2018–19
