= Sam Jones (footballer, born 1991) =

Footballer (born 1991)

Personal information
- Full name: Samuel Isaac Jones
- Date of birth: 18 September 1991 (age 35)
- Place of birth: Barnsley, England
- Position: Attacking midfielder

Youth career
- 2007–2010: Leeds United

Senior career*
Years	Team	Apps	(Gls)
2010–2011	Armthorpe Welfare	1	(2)
2014	Retford United	9	(3)
2014–2015	Heanor Town	34	(16)
2015–2016	Alfreton Town	36	(13)
2016–2017	Gateshead	26	(9)
2017–2018	Grimsby Town	43	(13)
2018–2019	Shrewsbury Town	5	(1)
2018–2019	→ Cheltenham Town (loan)	12	(2)
2019–2020	Harrogate Town	6	(1)
2020	→ York City (loan)	3	(0)
2020–2021	Kettering Town	4	(0)
Total		179	(58)

International career
2009	Wales U19	2	(0)
- * Club domestic league appearances and goals

Samuel Isaac Jones (born 18 September 1991) is a former professional footballer who played as an attacking midfielder and centre forward.

A Welsh former U19 International, Jones started his career with Leeds United as a youngster, before taking a break from the game to travel Australia. After returning to England, he played for Retford United and Heanor Town, ending the latter as their top goalscorer in the 2014–15 season. He then spent the next season at Alfreton Town where he was also top goalscorer. This earned him his first full-time move to National League side Gateshead; having scored 9 goals in 18 starts by January 2017, this alerted him to the management team at Grimsby Town, in turn earning him a move into professional football. He then moved to League One side Shrewsbury Town in the following January transfer window. He later had spells with Cheltenham Town, Harrogate Town, York City and Kettering Town.

== Club career ==
Jones was born in Barnsley, South Yorkshire. He moved to Doncaster when he was 10 years old. Aged 15, he began his career with Leeds United's U18s and gained a two-year scholarship, during which time he represented Wales at under-19 level. After his release from Leeds, he played for Armthorpe Welfare between two seasons through 2010 and 2011, however, he suffered a back injury and then broke his ankle playing for Armthorpe. Having taken a break from football, he chose to travel, working on a farm and in a cheese factory while in Australia and playing football there.

=== Retford United ===
On his return to England, Jones spent the latter end of the 2013/14 season at Retford United, making his debut on 1 March 2014, losing 4–0 at home to Heanor Town. On 8 April 2014, he scored from a free-kick in the 2–1 home defeat to Glasshoughton Welfare. On 12 April 2014, Jones scored in the opening minute in the 4–0 home win against Winterton Rangers. Jones finished the season with the second goal in the 2–1 home victory over Garforth Town; a corner was taken on 36 minutes from which Jones scored with a header.

Jones scored 1 goal and made 2 appearances in the Northern Counties East League Cup Jones helped the club reach ninth position in the league table. He scored 3 goals and made 9 league appearances for the team.

=== Heanor Town ===
Jones had his first full season as a player with Northern Counties East League Premier Division side Heanor Town for the 2014/2015 season. He made his debut in the opening game of the season in the 3–0 away win at Albion Sports. Three days later, his first goal came in the 2–0 home win over Pickering Town; his team were awarded a penalty for infringement, Jones took responsibility for the penalty and equalised.

He scored the match winning goal on 30 September 2014 in the 2–1 home win over Handsworth Parramore; after being awarded a penalty for a bad foul, Jones scored on 87 minutes. On 28 October 2014, he scored the opening goal in the 1–1 draw against Parkgate; a foul near the byline by their goalkeeper lead to a penalty being given from which Jones scored. On 11 November 2014, he scored in the 2–2 stalemate against Borrowash Victoria in the Derbyshire Senior Cup; the initial equaliser on 54 minutes from the penalty spot.

Jones scored a hat-trick on 14 March 2015, in the 6–0 away win at Retford; scoring the opening goal on 16 minutes, collecting the ball 25 yards out, he beat his marker and fired into the top corner, this was his tenth goal of the season; Jones scored the 5th goal of the game on 74 minutes, having been awarded a direct free kick, he scored from 25 yards out; he then scored the 6th and final goal of the game in the 86th minute from a deflected strike. Jones scored another hat-trick on 18 April 2015, in the 8–0 away victory at Glasshoughton Welfare; a 58th-minute strike from the left side of the box to the far post; on 80 minutes he shot low past the keeper to the centre; his third came from the penalty spot on 88 minutes.

Jones made 5 appearances in the 2014–15 FA Vase competition. He was their top scorer with 17 goals in all competitions, including 6 penalties. Following the 2014–15 campaign, he was named the fans' player of the year.

=== Alfreton Town ===
Jones joined Conference North side Alfreton Town in June 2015 on a one-year deal. He made his debut for Alfreton on 8 August 2015, the opening day of the season in the 2–2 away draw at Bradford Park Avenue. Jones was sent off on 12 March 2016, in the 3–3 away draw at Hednesford Town, as a result of this, Jones was given a three match suspension. Jones made 3 appearances in the 2015–16 FA Cup, and scored in the 3–2 away defeat at Macclesfield.

Jones scored a hat-trick in the semi-final of the Derbyshire Senior Cup against Long Eaton. Jones was in the team that went on to win the Derbyshire Senior Cup, beating Belper Town in the final on penalties.

=== Gateshead ===
Jones moved to National League side Gateshead at the start of the 2016–2017 season with manager Neil Aspin on a two-year deal 2-year deal. He made his debut with Gateshead on the opening day of the season, from the substitute bench in the 3–0 home victory against Chester. On 16 August 2016, he scored his first goal for the club in the 6–1 home win over York; after coming off the subs bench only 3 minutes prior with his team 5–1 up, Jones scored with six minutes to go. On 20 August 2016, he made his full debut in the 3–2 defeat at Bromley. Jones scored his final goal for the club in the 2–0 away victory at Solihull Moors; Jones scoring the second on 90 minutes with a by back-heel directly through their goalkeepers legs.

=== Grimsby Town ===
Grimsby had three bids rejected by Gateshead, due to falling below their valuation. However, on 31 January 2017, Jones signed a 2 1/2-year deal with newly promoted League Two side Grimsby Town for an undisclosed fee. He made his first appearance for the club on 4 February 2017 in the 1–1 home draw against Luton Town, coming off the subs bench to replace Chris Clements in the 83rd minute.

=== Shrewsbury Town ===
In January 2018 he joined League One side Shrewsbury Town on a 2 1/2-year deal for an undisclosed fee. He made five first-team appearances in the remainder of the 2017–18 season, scoring once in a 1–1 draw away at Blackpool, however did not make another appearance for the club, spending time on loan at Cheltenham Town the following season, before being released by mutual consent in June 2019.

=== Harrogate Town ===
Jones joined National League side Harrogate Town for the 2019–20 season. In February 2020, he joined National League North side York City on loan until the end of the season. His loan spell at York was cut short because of the covid-19 pandemic bringing an early end to the 2019-20 season and in May 2020 it was revealed that an agreement had been reached to terminate his contract at Harrogate Town.

=== Kettering Town ===
On 17 September 2020, Jones signed for National League North club Kettering Town.

== International career ==
Despite being born in England, Jones has represented the Wales national under-19 football team. He made his debut on 30 September 2008 in a 0–0 friendly against Montenegro U19s at the Gradski Stadium in Nikšić, Montenegro.

On 10 November 2008, Jones played in the qualifying round of the UEFA European Under-19 Championship, during a 3–2 defeat by Romania U19s at the Mardan Sports Complex in Antalya, Turkey. Jones was on the subs bench for the following matches a few days later against Turkey U19s and Andorra U19s; Wales finishing the group in third place.

== Style of play ==
Jones is tall and physically strong, with good passing ability on the ball. He is known to be able to run past players, make late runs off the ball into the box, and score with both feet and his head.

Jones is noted as an attacking midfielder; throughout his career he has played in various positions in a utility role, playing centre-mid, right-wing-back, in the 10 as a playmaker, also in a centre forward role.

== Personal life ==
Jones is married to his wife of 2 years, he is a reformed Christian and previously worked part-time for a Church.

== Career statistics ==
As of match played 28 April 2019

Appearances and goals by club, season and competition
Club	Season	League			FA Cup		League Cup		Other		Total	
Club	Season	Division	Apps	Goals	Apps	Goals	Apps	Goals	Apps	Goals	Apps	Goals
Armthorpe Welfare
Armthorpe Welfare	2010–11	NCEL Premier Division	1	2	1	1	—		0	0	2	3
Armthorpe Welfare	2011–12	NCEL Premier Division	0	0	0	0	—		1 (Note: One appearance and one goal in FA Vase)	1	1	1
Armthorpe Welfare	Total		1	2	1	1	—		1	1	3	4
Retford United
Retford United	2013–14	NCEL Premier Division	9	3	0	0	—		2 (Note: Two appearances and one goal in Northern Counties East League Cup)	1	11	4
Heanor Town
Heanor Town	2014–15	NCEL Premier Division	34	16	0	0	—		6 (Note: Five appearances in FA Vase, one appearances and one goal in Derbyshire Senior Cup)	1	40	17
Alfreton Town
Alfreton Town	2015–16	National League North	36	13	3	1	—		2 (Note: Two appearances and three goals in Derbyshire Senior Cup)	3	41	17
Gateshead
Gateshead	2016–17	National League	26	9	2	2	—		2 (Note: Appearances in FA Trophy)	0	30	11
Grimsby Town	2016–17	League Two	18	7	—		—		0	0	18	7
Grimsby Town	2017–18	League Two	25	6	1	0	0	0	1 (Note: Appearances in the EFL Trophy)	0	27	6
Grimsby Town	Total		43	13	1	0	0	0	1	0	45	13
Shrewsbury Town	2017–18	League One	5	1	—		—		0	0	5	1
Cheltenham Town (loan)	2018–19	League Two	12	2	—		1	0	2	0	15	2
Harrogate Town	2019–20	National League	0	0	0	0	—		0	0	0	0
Career total			166	59	7	4	1	0	16	6	190	69

== Honours ==
Alfreton Town

- Derbyshire Senior Cup: 2015–16

Individual

- Supporters Player of the Year: 2014–15
