= Twamley =

Twamley is a surname. Notable people with the surname include:

- Bruce Twamley (born 1952), Canadian soccer player
- Lewys Twamley (born 2003), Welsh footballer
- Louisa Anne Meredith, also known as Louisa Anne Twamley, an English-Australian writer
