= 2021 EFL League Two play-off final =

Association football match

- Wembley Stadium in London hosted the final.
Morecambe	Newport County
1	0
- After extra time
- Date: 31 May 2021
- Venue: Wembley Stadium, London
- Referee: Bobby Madley
- Attendance: 9,083
- Weather: Sunny

The 2021 EFL League Two play-off final was an association football match which was played on 31 May 2021 at Wembley Stadium, London, between Morecambe and Newport County. The match determined the fourth and final team to gain promotion from EFL League Two, the fourth tier of English football, to League One for the 2021–22 season. The top three teams of 2020–21 EFL League Two gained automatic promotion, while the clubs placed from fourth to seventh in the table took part in the 2021 English Football League play-offs.

The match was played in front of 9,083 spectators in sunny conditions, with Bobby Madley as the referee. Goalless after 90 minutes, the game went into extra time. A minute into the second period of additional time, John O'Sullivan was brought down by Ryan Haynes and the referee awarded Morecambe a penalty which Carlos Mendes Gomes converted to give his side the lead. The match ended 1–0 to Morecambe who were promoted to League One, the third tier of English football, for the first time in the club's history.

== Route to the final ==
EFL League Two final table, leading positions
Pos	Team	Pld	W	D	L	GF	GA	GD	Pts
1	Cheltenham Town	46	24	10	12	61	39	+22	82
2	Cambridge United	46	24	8	14	73	49	+24	80
3	Bolton Wanderers	46	23	10	13	59	50	+9	79
4	Morecambe	46	23	9	14	69	58	+11	78
5	Newport County	46	20	13	13	57	42	+15	73
6	Forest Green Rovers	46	20	13	13	59	51	+8	73
7	Tranmere Rovers	46	20	13	13	55	50	+5	73

Morecambe finished the regular 2020–21 season in fourth place in EFL League Two, the fourth tier of the English football league system, one place and five points ahead of Newport County. Both therefore missed out on the three automatic places for promotion to EFL League One and instead took part in the play-offs to determine the fourth promoted team. Morecambe finished one point behind Bolton Wanderers (who were promoted in third place), two behind Cambridge United (promoted in second) and four behind Cheltenham Town (who were promoted as champions).

Newport County's opponents for their play-off semi-final were Forest Green Rovers and the first match of the two-legged tie was held at Rodney Parade in Newport on 18 May 2021. Matt Dolan put the home side ahead in the 31st minute with a left-footed strike from around 25 yards (23 m) after Josh Sheehan had played him the ball. Ten minutes into the second half, Forest Green Rovers' Aaron Collins missed an opportunity to score with a header. A minute later, his brother Lewis Collins doubled Newport County's lead, running on to a long goal kick to shoot past Luke McGee, the Forest Green Rovers goalkeeper. No further goals were scored and the match ended 2–0. The second leg was played five days later at The New Lawn, Forest Green Rovers' home ground in Nailsworth. Ebou Adams gave Forest Green the lead after seven minutes when he headed in Nicky Cadden's cross, and Collins made it 2–0 within a minute after he volleyed in a Baily Cargill cross. Eight minutes into the second half, Cadden's free kick crept in at the far post to make it 3–0 and give Forest Green the lead in the tie on aggregate. Kevin Ellison then became the oldest goalscorer in play-off history when his 70th-minute strike from 25 yards (23 m) went into the Forest Green net off the underside of the crossbar. Six minutes later, Joss Labadie scored for Newport County from a Ryan Haynes cross to make it 4–3 on aggregate before a Jamille Matt goal three minutes from full time levelled the tie and sent the match into extra time. With one minute remaining in the second period of extra time, Nicky Maynard scored for Newport County to end the match 4–3 to Forest Green Rovers, but 5–4 on aggregate to Newport County who progressed to the final.

Morecambe faced Tranmere Rovers in the semi-final, with the first leg taking place at Prenton Park in Tranmere on 20 May 2021. Nathaniel Knight-Percival gave Morecambe the lead in the 15th minute when he deflected in a cross from Liam McAlinden but the home side equalised four minutes later when Peter Clarke scored with a header. A minute into stoppage time in the first half, McAlinden converted Cole Stockton's cross to restore Morecambe's lead. After a goalless second half, the match ended 2–1. The second leg was held three days later at the Globe Arena in Morecambe. Aaron Wildig put Morecambe ahead after nine minutes with McAlinden providing the assist. Eight minutes into the second half, James Vaughan scored from a David Nugent header to make it 1–1. The match ended without further goals and Morecambe progressed to the final with a 3–2 aggregate victory.

== Match ==
=== Background ===
This was Morecambe's first appearance in the play-off final, having played once before in the League play-offs in 2010 where they lost to Dagenham & Redbridge 7–2 on aggregate in the semi-final. They had played in League Two since gaining promotion from the Football Conference in the 2006–07 season through the play-offs and had never played in the third tier of English football in their history. Newport County were making their second play-off final appearance, having been defeated 1–0 by Tranmere Rovers in the 2019 EFL League Two play-off final. They had played in the fourth tier of English football since being promoted from the Conference via the play-offs in the 2012–13 season, beating Wrexham 2–0 in the final at Wembley. During the regular season, Newport won both meetings between the teams, winning 2–1 at Rodney Parade in December 2020 and 3–1 at the Globe Arena the following March. Carlos Mendes Gomes and Stockton were Morecambe's top scorers during the regular season with 15 goals each. Tristan Abrahams and Pádraig Amond were joint-highest scorers for Newport County, with eight goals each. Bobby Madley was the referee for the match, assisted by Geoffrey Liddle and David Hunt, while the fourth official was Craig Hicks.

=== Summary ===
The match kicked off around 3 p.m. on 31 May 2021 in sunny conditions with 9,083 spectators. Two minutes in, Mendes Gomes was fouled and a quickly-taken free kick resulted in him shooting wide of the Newport County goal. In the eighth minute, Mickey Demetriou launched a long throw-in into the Morecambe penalty area but the ball was caught by goalkeeper Kyle Letheren. Samuel Lavelle's looping header was then saved by Newport County goalkeeper Tom King. In the 13th minute, Scot Bennett's header from another Demetriou throw-in rolled just past the outside of the post. Letheren brought Bennett down but no penalty was awarded by Madley. Liam Shephard then struck a shot following another Demetriou throw-in, but the ball hit one of his teammates who was in an offside position. Midway through the half, Labadie's shot was blocked and Sheehan's subsequent strike was saved by Letheren, before the players took a drinks break. In the 32nd minute, Amond's shot from the edge of the Morecambe penalty area went wide before Sheehan's curling strike was also off-target. With three minutes of the half remaining, Aaron Lewis kicked the ball on the volley but his shot went over the Morecambe bar. In the 43rd minute, Mendes Gomes passed to Liam Gibson whose shot was on target but cleared by Shephard. Two minutes into first-half stoppage time, a shot from Bennett took a deflection off Yann Songo'o but the ball went just wide of the Morecambe goal, and Demetriou headed off-target from the resulting corner before the half was brought to a close with the score at 0–0.

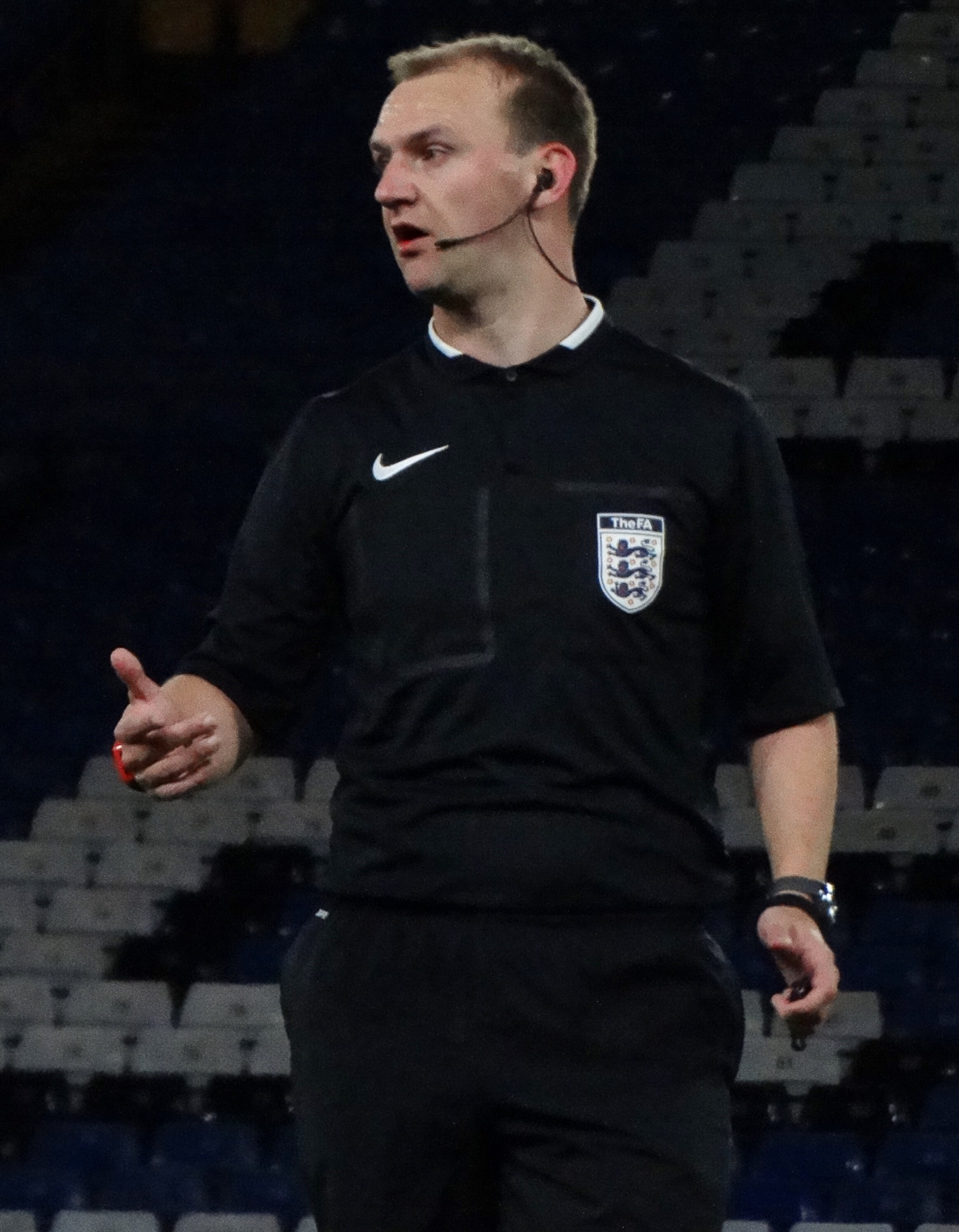
Bobby Madley (pictured in 2015) awarded a penalty to Morecambe in extra time.

Neither side made any changes to their personnel during the interval. Four minutes into the second half, Labadie passed to Collins whose deflected shot was saved by Letheren. In the 60th minute, Sheehan's shot from distance was saved and two minutes later Mendes Gomes made a clearance before Amond was able to shoot. Midway through the second half, Newport County made the first change of the game, making a double substitution with Ryan Taylor and Anthony Hartigan replacing Lewis and Dolan. Collins then saw his overhead kick from Demetriou's throw-in go over the Morecambe crossbar before Ryan Cooney's long-range shot was saved by King, and then the teams took their second-half drinks break. In the 75th minute, Morecambe made their first substitution of the afternoon with McAlinden being replaced by Brad Lyons. With eleven minutes of regular time remaining, Shephard's shot from 20 yards (18 m) was on target but saved by Letheren. A minute later, Maynard came on to replace Amond for Newport County, before Wildig's corner was headed over by Lavelle. Ellison then came on with four minutes of regular time remaining, replacing Collins for Newport County. In second-half stoppage time, Haynes took a free kick which was saved by Letheren before the full-time whistle was blown, and with the game goalless, it headed into extra time.

Before the first period of extra time kicked off, Morecambe substituted Wildig off and replaced him with John O'Sullivan. Two minutes in, Morecambe's Stockton headed Cooney's cross wide and four minutes later, Labadie became the first player of the match to be shown a yellow card after he fouled Songo'o. Just before half-time, Maynard's cross found Labadie but his shot went over the crossbar from close range and the half ended with score still at 0–0. Morecambe made one further change, with Kelvin Mellor replacing Gibson. A minute into the second period of extra time, O'Sullivan was brought down by Haynes and the referee awarded Morecambe a penalty which Mendes Gomes converted to give his side the lead. In the 111th minute, Newport County made another substitution with Priestley Farquharson coming on for Haynes before Hartigan's shot went over the Morecambe crossbar. Mendes Gomes was then replaced by Alex Kenyon for Morecambe. After three minutes of stoppage time, the final whistle was blown with Morecambe winning 1–0 and securing promotion to League One for the first time in their history.

=== Details ===
31 May 2021
15:00 BST

Morecambe	1–0 (a.e.t.)	Newport County
Mendes Gomes 107' (pen.)	Report

Wembley Stadium, London
Attendance: 9,083
Referee: Bobby Madley

Morecambe	Newport County

GK	1	(Wales) Kyle Letheren
RB	21	(England) Ryan Cooney
CB	5	(Scotland) Samuel Lavelle (c)
CB	4	(England) Nathaniel Knight-Percival
LB	22	(England) Liam Gibson		(substituted off) 105'
DM	24	(Cameroon) Yann Songo'o
RM	19	(Republic of Ireland) Liam McAlinden		(substituted off) 75'
CM	10	(England) Aaron Wildig		(substituted off) 90'
CM	8	(France) Toumani Diagouraga
LM	11	(Spain) Carlos Mendes Gomes	(yellow card) 108'	(substituted off) 114'
CF	9	(England) Cole Stockton
Substitutes:
GK	12	(England) Mark Halstead
DF	2	(England) Kelvin Mellor		(substituted on) 105'
DF	6	(England) Harry Davis
MF	14	(England) Alex Kenyon		(substituted on) 114'
MF	15	(Northern Ireland) Brad Lyons		(substituted on) 75'
MF	16	(Republic of Ireland) John O'Sullivan	(yellow card) 112'	(substituted on) 90'
MF	18	(England) Ben Pringle
Manager:
(Scotland) Derek Adams

GK	1	(Wales) Tom King
CB	32	(Wales) Liam Shephard
CB	8	(England) Matthew Dolan		(substituted off) 63'
CB	28	(England) Mickey Demetriou	(yellow card) 120'
RWB	14	(Wales) Aaron Lewis		(substituted off) 62'
CM	4	(England) Joss Labadie (c)	(yellow card) 96'
CM	10	(Wales) Josh Sheehan
CM	17	(England) Scot Bennett
LWB	3	(England) Ryan Haynes		(substituted off) 111'
CF	9	(Republic of Ireland) Pádraig Amond		(substituted off) 80'
CF	21	(Wales) Lewis Collins		(substituted off) 86'
Substitutes
GK	30	(England) Nick Townsend
DF	6	(England) Priestley Farquharson		(substituted on) 111'
MF	20	(England) Anthony Hartigan		(substituted on) 63'
MF	22	(England) Kevin Ellison		(substituted on) 86'
MF	34	(Wales) Joe Ledley
FW	18	(England) Nicky Maynard		(substituted on) 80'
FW	29	(England) Ryan Taylor		(substituted on) 62'
Manager:
(Wales) Michael Flynn

Man of the Match:

Assistant referees:
Geoffrey Liddle
David Hunt
Fourth official:
Craig Hicks

Match rules

- 90 minutes
- 30 minutes of extra time if necessary
- Penalty shoot-out if scores still level
- Seven named substitutes
- Maximum of five substitutions, with a sixth allowed in extra time

Statistics
	Morecambe	Newport County
Possession	40%	60%
Total shots	11	24
Shots on target	2	5
Corner kicks	3	12
Fouls committed	14	20
Yellow cards	2	2
Red cards	0	0

== Post-match ==
Winning goalscorer Mendes Gomes said "I worked all my life for moments like this ... If I was writing a story, probably it would be this way. I knew that penalty would mean a lot if I put it in and I just tried to stay as calm as possible." His captain, Lavelle, noted that "League One is unheard for Morecambe. I can’t describe it ... It’s one of the best days of my life." Their manager, Derek Adams, admitted the match was disappointing, suggesting "It was a difficult game, there wasn't a lot of good play in the match ... I think today it was all about Morecambe. I was never nervous. It was in the stars, it was our day."

His counterpart Mike Flynn blamed the referee for his side's failure, saying, "It went wrong with two very very bad refereeing decisions that have cost us at Wembley despite us dominating the game." However, Flynn congratulated his opposition: "Congratulations to Morecambe, they've had an outstanding season and they have a group of players that never know when they are beaten."
