= 2022–23 Newport County A.F.C. season =

Welsh association football club season

Newport County
2022–23 season
- Owner: Newport County AFC Supporters Trust
- Chairman: Gavin Foxall until 24 March 2023. Vacant from 24 March 2023
- Manager: James Rowberry (until 10 October 2022); Darren Kelly (caretaker manager 10 October 2022 to 20 October 2022). Graham Coughlan (from 20 October 2022)
- Stadium: Rodney Parade
- League Two: 15th
- FA Cup: Second round
- EFL Cup: Third round
- EFL Trophy: Second round
- Top goalscorer: League: Omar Bogle (17); All: Omar Bogle (19)
- Highest home attendance: 4,988 v Walsall (6 August 2022), EFL League Two
- Lowest home attendance: 705 v Southampton Under-21 (18 October 2022), EFL Trophy Southern Group F
- Average home league attendance: 4,108
Home colours	Away colours

The 2022–23 Newport County A.F.C. season was the club's tenth consecutive season in the EFL League Two. Newport's 70th season in the Football League and 102nd season of league football overall. They also competed in the FA Cup, EFL Cup and EFL Trophy.

Newport reached the third round of the 2022–23 EFL Cup, losing 3–0 to Leicester City of the Premier League.

Former club chairman David Hando died on 16 January 2023. Hando was influential in reforming the club in 1989 after the club had gone bankrupt. In 2015 Hando had been awarded the British Empire Medal for services to sport.

In March 2023 club chairman Gavin Foxall resigned due to ill health. Foxall had been chairman since August 2016, succeeding Tony Pring who had been interim chairman since the supporters trust took ownership of the club in September 2015.

Newport finished the 2022-23 season in 15th position in League Two.

== Managerial changes ==
On 10 October 2022 James Rowberry was sacked as team manager with Newport in 18th place in League Two after 13 league matches. Assistant manager Carl Serrant was also sacked. Sporting Director Darren Kelly took the role of caretaker manager. On 20 October 2022, Graham Coughlan was appointed manager on a two-and-a-half-year contract with Newport in 19th place in League Two after 14 league matches of the 2022–23 season. Joe Dunne was appointed assistant manager to Coughlan

Darren Kelly resigned his role as Sporting Director on 23 February 2023. On 30 April 2023 Chris Finn was appointed Head of football operations.

== First-team squad ==
As of 21 June 2022

Note: Flags indicate national team as has been defined under FIFA eligibility rules. Players may hold more than one non-FIFA nationality.

No.	Name	Nat.	Position(s)	Date of birth (age)	Apps.	Goals	Year signed	Signed from	Transfer fee
Goalkeepers
1	Joe Day	(England)	GK	13 August 1990 (age 35)	275	0	2021	(Wales) Cardiff City	Free
30	Nick Townsend	(Antigua and Barbuda)	GK	1 November 1994 (age 31)	102	0	2018	(England) Barnsley	Free
39	Evan Ovendale	(Wales)	GK	21 February 2004 (age 22)	0	0	2022	Academy	Trainee
Defenders
2	Cameron Norman	(England)	RB/CB	12 October 1995 (age 30)	62	0	2021	(England) Walsall	Free
3	Declan Drysdale	(England)	CB/DM	14 November 1999 (age 26)	12	0	2022	(England) Coventry City	Undisclosed
5	James Clarke	(England)	CB	17 November 1989 (age 36)	47	1	2021	(England) Walsall	Free
6	Priestley Farquharson	(England)	CB/RB	15 March 1997 (age 29)	33	0	2021	(Wales) Connah's Quay Nomads	Undisclosed
14	Aaron Lewis	(Wales)	RB/LB	26 June 1998 (age 28)	67	2	2021	(England) Lincoln City	Free
17	Scot Bennett	(England)	CB/DM/CM	30 November 1990 (age 35)	263	11	2016	(England) Notts County	Free
23	Harrison Bright	(Wales)	RB	23 February 2004 (age 22)	5	0	2022	Academy	Trainee
27	Adam Lewis	(England)	LB/LM/DM	8 November 1999 (age 26)	12	0	2022	(England) Liverpool	Loan
28	Mickey Demetriou	(England)	CB	12 March 1990 (age 36)	261	23	2017	(England) Shrewsbury Town	Free
32	Joe Woodiwiss	(Wales)	CB	10 January 2002 (age 24)	9	0	2019	Academy	Trainee
Midfielders
4	Sam Bowen	(Wales)	CM/DM/AM	14 January 2001 (age 25)	9	0	2022	(Wales) Cardiff City	Undisclosed
7	Robbie Willmott	(England)	RM/LM/AM	16 May 1990 (age 36)	286	21	2017	(England) Chelmsford	Free
8	Matty Dolan	(England)	DM/CB/CM	11 February 1993 (age 33)	213	16	2017	(England) Yeovil Town	Free
11	James Waite	(Wales)	AM/RW	11 May 1999 (age 27)	29	4	2022	(Wales) Penybont	Free
20	Hayden Lindley	(England)	DM	2 September 2002 (age 23)	5	0	2022	(England) Aston Villa	Loan
22	Nathan Moriah-Welsh	(Guyana)	CM	18 March 2002 (age 24)	12	2	2022	(England) Bournemouth	Loan
24	Aaron Wildig	(England)	CM/AM/DM	15 April 1992 (age 34)	9	1	2022	(England) Morecambe	Free
29	Will Evans	(Wales)	LW/AM	1 June 1997 (age 29)	14	3	2022	(Wales) Bala Town	Undisclosed
33	Lewys Twamley	(Wales)	LW/LM/LB	26 May 2003 (age 23)	4	0	2020	Academy	Trainee
35	Jack Karadogan	(Wales)	CM/AM/DM	4 February 2004 (age 22)	0	0	2022	Academy	Trainee
Forwards
9	Omar Bogle	(England)	CF	26 July 1993 (age 32)	15	7	2022	(England) Hartlepool United	Undisclosed
10	Offrande Zanzala	(Republic of the Congo)	CF	8 November 1996 (age 29)	3	0	2022	(England) Barrow	Free
18	Chanka Zimba	(England)	CF	29 December 2001 (age 24)	14	2	2022	(Wales) Cardiff City	Loan
19	Thierry Nevers	(England)	LW/CF/RW	26 March 2002 (age 24)	7	1	2022	(England) West Ham United	Loan
21	Lewis Collins	(Wales)	SS/AM/RW	9 May 2001 (age 25)	73	5	2017	Academy	Trainee

== Squad statistics ==
Numbers in parentheses denote appearances as substitute.
Players with squad numbers struck through and marked † left the club during the playing season.
Players with names in italics and marked * were on loan from another club for the whole of their season with Newport County.
Players listed with no appearances have been in the matchday squad but only as unused substitutes.
Key to positions: GK – Goalkeeper; DF – Defender; MF – Midfielder; FW – Forward

As of 11 February 2023

No.	Pos	Nat	Player	Total		League Two		FA Cup		League Cup		League Trophy	
No.	Pos	Nat	Player	Apps	Goals	Apps	Goals	Apps	Goals	Apps	Goals	Apps	Goals
1	GK	(England) ENG	Joe Day	20	0	14+0	0	2+0	0	2+0	0	2+0	0
2	DF	(England) ENG	Cameron Norman	35	2	27+1	2	2+0	0	2+1	0	2+0	0
3	DF	(England) ENG	Declan Drysdale	25	0	16+2	0	1+0	0	2+0	0	3+1	0
4	MF	(Wales) WAL	Sam Bowen	12	0	3+2	0	0+0	0	2+1	0	3+1	0
5	DF	(England) ENG	James Clarke	18	0	15+0	0	1+0	0	0+0	0	1+1	0
6	DF	(England) ENG	Priestley Farquharson	24	3	17+0	2	2+0	1	3+0	0	2+0	0
9	FW	(England) ENG	Omar Bogle	36	9	24+4	7	2+0	0	1+1	0	2+2	2
10	FW	(Republic of the Congo) CGO	Offrande Zanzala	13	3	8+3	3	0+0	0	0+1	0	0+1	0
11	MF	(Wales) WAL	James Waite	28	3	15+6	0	2+0	0	2+1	2	1+1	1
14	DF	(Wales) WAL	Aaron Lewis	30	1	19+3	1	1+1	0	2+0	0	3+1	0
16	FW	(Republic of Ireland) IRL	Calum Kavanagh*	2	1	0+2	1	0+0	0	0+0	0	0+0	0
17	DF	(England) ENG	Scot Bennett	28	1	23+0	1	2+0	0	0+1	0	2+0	0
19	FW	(England) ENG	Charlie McNeill*	2	0	2+0	0	0+0	0	0+0	0	0+0	0
20	MF	(Republic of Ireland) IRL	Harry Charsley	2	0	2+0	0	0+0	0	0+0	0	0+0	0
22	MF	(Guyana) GUY	Nathan Moriah-Welsh*	31	3	19+4	3	2+0	0	1+1	0	2+2	0
24	MF	(England) ENG	Aaron Wildig	20	1	8+9	0	0+0	0	1+1	1	1+0	0
27	DF	(England) ENG	Adam Lewis*	26	2	16+3	1	1+0	1	3+0	0	3+0	0
28	DF	(England) ENG	Mickey Demetriou	34	1	27+0	1	2+0	0	2+1	0	2+0	0
29	MF	(Wales) WAL	Will Evans	34	4	18+9	2	2+0	0	1+1	1	2+1	1
30	GK	(Antigua and Barbuda) ATG	Nick Townsend	17	0	14+0	0	0+0	0	1+0	0	2+0	0
Players out on loan:
7	MF	(England) ENG	Robbie Willmott	17	0	4+8	0	0+0	0	2+0	0	2+1	0
8	MF	(England) ENG	Matt Dolan	15	1	5+5	1	0+1	0	1+0	0	3+0	0
21	FW	(Wales) WAL	Lewis Collins	27	1	3+15	0	0+2	0	3+0	1	2+2	0
23	DF	(Wales) WAL	Harrison Bright	2	0	0+0	0	0+0	0	0+1	0	0+1	0
Players who left the club:
18	FW	(England) ENG	Chanka Zimba*	20	2	0+13	0	0+1	0	2+1	1	2+1	1
19	FW	(England) ENG	Thierry Nevers*	17	1	5+7	1	0+1	0	0+1	0	2+1	0
20	MF	(England) ENG	Hayden Lindley*	5	0	3+2	0	0+0	0	0+0	0	0+0	0

=== Goals record ===
As of 11 February 2023

Rank	No.	Nat.	Po.	Name	League Two	FA Cup	League Cup	League Trophy	Total
1	9	(England)	CF	Omar Bogle	7	0	0	2	9
2	29	(Wales)	LW	Will Evans	2	0	1	1	4
3	6	(England)	CB	Priestley Farquharson	2	1	0	0	3
3	10	(Republic of the Congo)	CF	Offrande Zanzala	3	0	0	0	3
3	11	(Wales)	AM	James Waite	0	0	2	1	3
3	22	(England)	CM	Nathan Moriah-Welsh	3	0	0	0	3
7	2	(England)	RB	Cameron Norman	2	0	0	0	2
7	18	(England)	CF	Chanka Zimba	0	0	1	1	2
7	27	(England)	LB	Adam Lewis	1	1	0	0	2
10	8	(England)	CM	Matt Dolan	1	0	0	0	1
10	14	(Wales)	LB	Aaron Lewis	1	0	0	0	1
10	16	(Republic of Ireland)	CF	Calum Kavanagh	1	0	0	0	1
10	17	(England)	CB	Scot Bennett	1	0	0	0	1
10	19	(England)	LW	Thierry Nevers	1	0	0	0	1
10	21	(Wales)	CF	Aaron Collins	0	0	1	0	1
10	24	(England)	CM	Aaron Wildig	0	0	1	0	1
10	28	(England)	CB	Mickey Demetriou	1	0	0	0	1
Own Goals					1	1	0	1	3
Total					27	3	6	6	42

=== Disciplinary record ===
As of 11 February 2023

Rank	No.	Nat.	Po.	Name	League Two			FA Cup			League Cup			League Trophy			Total		
Rank	No.	Nat.	Po.	Name	Booked	(yellow card) (yellow-red card)	Sent off (straight red)	Booked	(yellow card) (yellow-red card)	Sent off (straight red)	Booked	(yellow card) (yellow-red card)	Sent off (straight red)	Booked	(yellow card) (yellow-red card)	Sent off (straight red)	Booked	(yellow card) (yellow-red card)	Sent off (straight red)
1	3	(England)	CB	Declan Drysdale	5	0	1	1	0	0	2	0	0	0	0	0	8	0	1
2	22	(England)	CM	Nathan Moriah-Welsh	6	0	0	0	0	0	0	0	0	1	0	0	7	0	0
3	17	(England)	CB	Scot Bennett	6	0	0	0	0	0	0	0	0	0	0	0	6	0	0
3	28	(England)	CB	Mickey Demetriou	4	0	0	0	0	0	0	0	0	1	0	0	6	0	0
5	2	(England)	RB	Cameron Norman	5	0	0	0	0	0	0	0	0	0	0	0	5	0	0
5	14	(Wales)	LB	Aaron Lewis	5	0	0	0	0	0	0	0	0	0	0	0	5	0	0
7	11	(Wales)	AM	James Waite	3	0	0	3	0	0	0	0	0	0	0	0	4	0	0
7	27	(England)	LB	Adam Lewis	2	0	0	0	0	0	1	0	0	1	0	0	4	0	0
7	29	(Wales)	LW	Will Evans	3	0	0	0	0	0	1	0	0	0	0	0	4	0	0
10	5	(England)	CB	James Clarke	3	0	0	0	0	0	0	0	0	0	0	0	3	0	0
11	4	(Wales)	DM	Sam Bowen	1	0	0	0	0	0	1	0	0	0	0	0	2	0	0
11	6	(England)	CB	Priestley Farquharson	1	0	0	0	0	0	0	0	0	1	0	0	2	0	0
11	7	(England)	RM	Robbie Willmott	0	0	0	0	0	0	2	0	0	0	0	0	2	0	0
13	1	(England)	GK	Joe Day	1	0	0	0	0	0	0	0	0	0	0	0	1	0	0
13	9	(England)	CF	Omar Bogle	1	0	0	0	0	0	0	0	0	0	0	0	1	0	0
13	10	(Republic of the Congo)	CF	Offrande Zanzala	1	0	0	0	0	0	0	0	0	0	0	0	1	0	0
13	19	(England)	LW	Thierry Nevers	1	0	0	0	0	0	0	0	0	0	0	0	1	0	0
13	20	(Republic of Ireland)	CM	Harry Charsley	1	0	0	0	0	0	0	0	0	0	0	0	1	0	0
13	21	(Wales)	CF	Aaron Collins	0	0	0	0	0	0	0	0	0	1	0	0	1	0	0
13	24	(England)	CM	Aaron Wildig	1	0	0	0	0	0	0	0	0	0	0	0	1	0	0
13	30	(Antigua and Barbuda)	GF	Nick Townsend	1	0	0	0	0	0	0	0	0	0	0	0	1	0	0
Total					53	0	1	2	0	0	7	0	0	4	0	0	66	0	1

== Transfers ==
For those players released or contract ended before the start of this season, see 2021–22 Newport County A.F.C. season.

=== Transfers In ===
Date	Pos	Player	Transferred from	Fee	Ref
21 June 2022	CF	(Republic of the Congo) Offrande Zanzala	(England) Barrow	Free Transfer	
10 June 2022 (Note: The transfer was announced on 25 May, and would become official on June 10 once the transfer window opened)	CM	(Wales) Sam Bowen	(Wales) Cardiff City	Undisclosed	
10 June 2022 (Note: The transfer was announced on 7 June, and would become official on 10 June once the transfer window opened)	CB	(England) Declan Drysdale	(England) Coventry City	Undisclosed	
10 June 2022 (Note: The transfer was announced on 27 May, and would become official on 10 June once the transfer window opened)	CF	(Wales) Will Evans	(Wales) Bala Town	Undisclosed	
1 July 2022	CF	(England) Omar Bogle	(England) Hartlepool United	Undisclosed	
1 July 2022 (Note: The transfer was announced on 6 June, and would become official on 1 July once Wildig's previous contract expires)	CM	(England) Aaron Wildig	(England) Morecambe	Free transfer	
15 September 2022	CM	(Wales) Josh Edwards	(Wales) Swansea City	Free Transfer	
17 January 2023	CM	(Republic of Ireland) Harry Charsley	(England) Port Vale	Free Transfer	

=== Transfers Out ===
Date	Pos	Player	Transferred to	Fee	Source
14 June 2023	FW	(Wales) Lewis Collins	(England) Torquay United	Free transfer	
16 June 2023	DF	(England) Cameron Norman	(England) Milton Keynes Dons	Free transfer	
16 June 2023	MF	(England) Robbie Willmott	(England) Woking	Free transfer	
23 June 2023	DF	(England) Priestley Farquharson	(England) Walsall	Free transfer	
30 June 2023	DF	(England) Matty Dolan	(England) Hartlepool United	Free transfer	
30 June 2023	DF	(Wales) Joe Woodiwiss	Free agent	Released	
30 June 2023	FW	(Wales) Lewys Twamley	Free agent	Released	
30 June 2023	MF	(Wales) Jack Karadogan	Free agent	Released	
30 June 2023	GK	(Wales) Evan Ovendale	Free agent	Released	
30 June 2023	DF	(Wales) Aaron Lewis	(England) Mansfield Town	Free transfer	
30 June 2023	DF	(England) Mickey Demetriou	(England) Crewe Alexandra	Free transfer	

=== Loans in ===
Date	Pos	Player	Loaned from	On loan until	Ref
10 June 2022 (Note: The loan agreement was announced on 3 June, and would become active on 10 June, when the transfer window opened)	CF	(England) Chanka Zimba	(Wales) Cardiff City	1 January 2023 (Note: On 29 December, it was announced that Zimba would return to Cardiff City)	
22 June 2022	LB	(England) Adam Lewis	(England) Liverpool	25 February 2023	
10 August 2022	CM	(Guyana) Nathan Moriah-Welsh	(England) Bournemouth	End of Season	
18 August 2022	LW	(England) Thierry Nevers	(England) West Ham United	1 January 2023 (Note: On 29 December, it was announced that Nevers would return to West Ham United)	
1 September 2022	DM	(England) Hayden Lindley	(England) Aston Villa	1 January 2023 (Note: On 29 December, it was announced that Lindley would return to Aston Villa)	
27 January 2023	CB	(Wales) Matt Baker	(England) Stoke City	End of Season	
31 January 2023	CF	(Republic of Ireland) Calum Kavanagh	(England) Middlesbrough	End of Season	
31 January 2023	CF	(England) Charlie McNeill	(England) Manchester United	End of Season	

=== Loans out ===
Date	Pos	Player	Loaned to	On loan until	Ref
1 August 2022	LM	(Wales) Lewys Twamley	(Wales) Pontypridd United	1 January 2023	
1 August 2022	CB	(Wales) Joe Woodiwiss	(Wales) Pontypridd United	1 January 2023	
5 January 2023	DM	(England) Matthew Dolan	(England) Hartlepool United	End of Season	
5 January 2023	RM	(England) Robbie Willmott	(England) Walsall	End of Season	
21 January 2023	CM	(Wales) Jack Karadogan	(Wales) Pontypridd United	End of Season	
30 January 2023	RB	(Wales) Harrison Bright	(Wales) Pontypridd United	End of Season	
1 February 2023	SS	(Wales) Lewis Collins	(England) Torquay United	End of Season	

== Pre-season and friendlies ==
On May 24, Newport announced the squad would enjoy a 5-day training camp in Cheshire. Three days later, the club announced four off the six pre-season oppositions. A double-header 60-minute games against Cardiff City was later added. A further addition to the pre-season schedule was added on June 14, against Forest Green Rovers.

Win Draw Loss Fixtures

1 July 2022 Friendly	Undy	0–7	Newport County	Undy
19:00 BST (UTC+1)		Report	Evans 15'; Wildig 31'; Bowen 41'; Waite 47', 53'; Stokes 76'; Zanzala 84' (pen.)	Stadium: The Causeway

9 July 2022 Friendly	Newport County	6–0	Hungerford Town	Newport
14:00 BST (UTC+1)	Clarke 8'; Evans 49'; Zimba 55'; Karadogan 65'; Waite 72'; Bogle 108'	Report		Stadium: Dragon Park; Attendance: 0 (Behind Closed Doors)
Note: 120-minute match split into two 60-minute games.

12 July 2022 Friendly	Cardiff City	2–0	Newport County	Leckwith
18:30 BST	Whyte 77'; Crole 81'	Report		Stadium: Cardiff International Sports Stadium

15 July 2022 Friendly	Weston-super-Mare	0–4	Newport County	Weston-super-Mare
19:30 BST (UTC+1)		Report	Collins 3'; Zimba 29'; Bright 44'; Dolan 84'	Stadium: Woodspring Stadium

16 July 2022 Friendly	Torquay United	0–0	Newport County	Torquay
15:00 BST (UTC+1)		Report		Stadium: Plainmoor

23 July 2022 Friendly	Forest Green Rovers	1–1	Newport County	Nailsworth
15:00 BST	Matt (?)	Report	Zanzala (?)	Stadium: The New Lawn

== Competitions ==
=== Overall record ===
Competition	First match	Last match	Starting round	Record							
Competition	First match	Last match	Starting round	Pld	W	D	L	GF	GA	GD	Win %
League Two	August 2022	May 2023	Matchday 1	0	0	0	0	0	0	+0	—
FA Cup	TBC	TBC	First round	0	0	0	0	0	0	+0	—
EFL Cup	TBC	TBC	First round	0	0	0	0	0	0	+0	—
EFL Trophy	TBC	TBC	Group stage	0	0	0	0	0	0	+0	—
Total				0	0	0	0	0	0	+0	—

Last updated: pre-season
Source: [ Soccerway]

=== League Two ===
==== League table ====
Pos	Team	Pld	W	D	L	GF	GA	GD	Pts
12	Tranmere Rovers	46	15	13	18	45	48	−3	58
13	Crewe Alexandra	46	14	16	16	48	60	−12	58
14	Sutton United	46	15	13	18	46	58	−12	58
15	Newport County	46	14	15	17	53	56	−3	57
16	Walsall	46	12	19	15	46	49	−3	55
17	Gillingham	46	14	13	19	36	49	−13	55
18	Doncaster Rovers	46	16	7	23	46	65	−19	55

Source: EFL Official Website
Rules for classification: 1) Points; 2) Goal difference; 3) Number of goals scored; 4) Head-to-head results; 5) Wins; 6) Away goals; 7) Penalty points (sec 9.5); 8) 12-point sending off offences

==== Results summary ====
Overall								Home						Away					
Pld	W	D	L	GF	GA	GD	Pts	W	D	L	GF	GA	GD	W	D	L	GF	GA	GD
46	14	15	17	53	56	−3	57	6	7	10	27	30	−3	8	8	7	26	26	0

Last updated: 8 May 2023.
Source: [ Soccerway]

==== Results by round ====
Round	1	2	3	4	5	6	7	8	9	10	11	12	13	14	15	16	17	18	19	20	21	22	23	24	25	26	27	28	29	30	31	32	33	34	35	36	37	38	39	40	41	42	43	44	45	46
Ground	A	H	A	H	H	A	H	A	H	H	A	A	H	A	H	A	A	H	H	A	H	A	H	H	A	A	H	A	H	A	A	H	A	A	H	H	A	A	H	A	H	H	A	H	A	H
Result	D	L	L	L	W	W	L	L	L	D	W	L	L	L	W	D	D	L	W	W	L	D	D	D	D	L	W	W	D	D	W	L	L	D	D	D	W	D	W	L	W	L	W	L	W	D
Position	11	17	22	23	19	16	17	17	19	18	16	17	18	19	18	18	18	19	18	17	18	18	18	18	18	18	19	18	18	19	16	18	18	18	18	18	16	18	17	18	17	18	14	14	14	15

Updated to match(es) played on 8 May 2023. Source: [ Soccerway]
A = Away; H = Home; W = Win; D = Draw; L = Loss

==== Matches ====
Win Draw Loss Fixtures

The league fixtures were announced on 23 June 2022.

30 July 2022 1	Sutton United	1–1	Newport County	Sutton, London
15:00 BST (UTC+1)	Bugiel 24'	Report	Bogle 38'	Stadium: Gander Green Lane; Attendance: 3,169; Referee: Sam Purkiss

6 August 2022 2	Newport County	0–1	Walsall	Newport
15:00 BST (UTC+1)		Report	Demetriou 63' (o.g.)	Stadium: Rodney Parade; Attendance: 4,988; Referee: Alan Young

13 August 2022 3	Bradford City	2–0	Newport County	Bradford
15:00 BST (UTC+1)	Smallwood 7'; Chapman 53'	Report		Stadium: Valley Parade; Attendance: 16,704; Referee: Will Finnie

16 August 2022 4	Newport County	2–3	Salford City	Newport
19:45 BST (UTC+1)	Bennett 72'; Bogle 75'	Report	Bolton 54'; Norman 57' (o.g.); Leak 83'	Stadium: Rodney Parade; Attendance: 3,678; Referee: Sunny Sukhvir Gill

20 August 2022 5	Newport County	2–1	Tranmere Rovers	Newport
15:00 BST (UTC+1)	Moriah-Welsh 29'; Bogle 38' (pen.)	Report	Aaron Lewis 23' (o.g.)	Stadium: Rodney Parade; Attendance: 4,070; Referee: Tom Nield

27 August 2022 6	Harrogate Town	0–4	Newport County	Harrogate
15:00 BST (UTC+1)		Report	Bogle 4', 44'; Ramsay 9' (o.g.); Nevers 22'	Stadium: Wetherby Road; Attendance: 1,757; Referee: Carl Boyesen

3 September 2022 7	Newport County	0–2	Grimsby Town	Newport
15:00 BST (UTC+1)		Report	Morris 63'; Clifton 83'	Stadium: Rodney Parade; Attendance: 4,251; Referee: Scott Oldham

13 September 2022 8	Stevenage	1–0	Newport County	Stevenage
19:45 BST (UTC+1)	Gilbey 48'	Report		Stadium: Broadhall Way; Attendance: 2,109; Referee: Oliver Langford

17 September 2022 9	Newport County	0–2	Barrow	Newport
15:00 BST (UTC+1)		Report	Gordon 45'; Gordon 59' (pen.)	Stadium: Rodney Parade; Attendance: 3,793; Referee: James Oldham

24 September 2022 10	Newport County	1–1	Carlisle United	Newport
15:00 BST (UTC+1)	Moriah-Welsh 30'	Report	Whelan 76'	Stadium: Rodney Parade; Attendance: 3,876; Referee: Keith Stroud

1 October 2022 11	Leyton Orient	1–2	Newport County	Leyton, London
15:00 BST (UTC+1)	Drinan 64'	Report	Evans 22'; Bogle 26' (pen.)	Stadium: Brisbane Road; Attendance: 7,403; Referee: Dean Whitestone

4 October 2022 12	Swindon Town	1–0	Newport County	Swindon
19:45 BST (UTC+1)	Jephcott 51'	Report		Stadium: County Ground; Attendance: 9,325; Referee: Peter Wright

8 October 2022 13	Newport County	0–1	Rochdale	Newport
15:00 BST (UTC+1)		Report	Ball 5'	Stadium: Rodney Parade; Attendance: 3,824; Referee: David Rock

15 October 2022 14	Crawley Town	2–1	Newport County	Crawley
15:00 BST (UTC+1)	Tilley 40'; Nadesen 57'	Report	Moriah-Welsh 79'	Stadium: Broadfield Stadium; Attendance: 2,839; Referee: Ben Toner

22 October 2022 15	Newport County	1–0	Colchester United	Newport
15:00 BST (UTC+1)	Evans 7'	Report		Stadium: Rodney Parade; Attendance: 3,994; Referee: Andrew Kitchen

25 October 2022 16	Mansfield Town	0–0	Newport County	Mansfield
19:45 BST (UTC+1)		Report		Stadium: Field Mill; Attendance: 5,624; Referee: Sam Barrott

29 October 2022 17	Northampton Town	1–1	Newport County	Northampton
14:00 BST (UTC+1)	Hoskins 90+3'	Report	Bogle 2'	Stadium: Sixfields Stadium; Attendance: 5,102; Referee: Thomas Kirk

12 November 2022 18	Newport County	1–2	Stockport County	Newport
15:00 UTC	Aaron Lewis 40'	Report	Hussey 40'; Madden 57'	Stadium: Rodney Parade; Attendance: 3,753; Referee: Andy Woolmer

19 November 2022 19	Newport County	2–0	Gillingham	Newport
15:00 UTC	Farquharson 43', 56'	Report		Stadium: Rodney Parade; Attendance: 4,300; Referee: Ollie Yates

2 December 2022 20	Crewe Alexandra	1–2	Newport County	Crewe
19:45 UTC	Brook 13'	Report	Norman 62'; Zanzala 85'	Stadium: Gresty Road; Attendance: 3,065; Referee: Rebecca Welch

10 December 2022 21	Newport County	0–1	Doncaster Rovers	Newport
15:00 UTC		Report	Knoyle 58'	Stadium: Rodney Parade; Attendance: 3,798; Referee: Adam Herczeg

26 December 2022 22	Wimbledon	1–1	Newport County	Wimbledon, London
15:00 UTC	Chislett 58'	Report	Zanzala 70' (pen.)	Stadium: Plough Lane; Attendance: 7,784; Referee: Paul Howard

30 December 2022 23	Newport County	0–0	Leyton Orient	Newport
19:45 UTC		Report		Stadium: Rodney Parade; Attendance: 4,313; Referee: Peter Wright

2 January 2023 24	Newport County	2–2	Crawley Town	Newport
15:00 UTC	Dolan 83'; Zanzala 90+2'	Report	Telford 36'; Telford 67' (pen.)	Stadium: Rodney Parade; Attendance: 4,184; Referee: Alan Young

7 January 2023 25	Rochdale	1–1	Newport County	Rochdale
15:00 UTC	Rodney 34'	Report	Adam Lewis 46'	Stadium: Spotland Stadium; Attendance: 2,452; Referee: Andy Haines

14 January 2023 26	Carlisle United	2–0	Newport County	Carlisle
15:00 UTC	Dennis 45+2'; Gordon 57'	Report		Stadium: Brunton Park; Attendance: 5,603; Referee: Martin Woods

4 February 2023 27	Newport County	2–1	Swindon Town	Newport
15:00 UTC	Norman 54'; Kavanagh 78'	Report	Adeloye 90+1'	Stadium: Rodney Parade; Attendance: 4,757; Referee: Neil Hair

11 February 2023 28	Barrow	0–1	Newport County	Barrow-in-Furness
15:00 UTC		Report	Demetriou 90+5'	Stadium: Holker Street; Attendance: 2,804; Referee: Seb Stockbridge

14 February 2023 29	Newport County	2–2	Stevenage	Newport
19:45 UTC	Bogle 43'; Bogle 84' (pen.)	Report	Norris 3'; Roberts 50'	Stadium: Rodney Parade; Attendance: 3,486; Referee: Ollie Yates

18 February 2023 30	Walsall	1–1	Newport County	Walsall
15:00 UTC	Hutchinson 32'	Report	Norman 78'	Stadium: Bescot Stadium; Attendance: 5,927; Referee: Sam Purkiss

21 February 2023 31	Hartlepool United	0–1	Newport County	Hartlepool
19:45 UTC		Report	Demetriou 90+1'	Stadium: Victoria Park; Attendance: 3,901; Referee: Ben Speedie

25 February 2023 32	Newport County	0–2	Sutton United	Newport
15:00 UTC		Report	Rowe 9'; Smith 65'	Stadium: Rodney Parade; Attendance: 3,968; Referee: Tom Nield

4 March 2023 33	Salford City	3–1	Newport County	Salford
15:00 UTC	Hendry 9'; McAleny 65'; Smith 90+1'	Report	Charsley 29'	Stadium: Moor Lane; Attendance: 2,394; Referee: Charles Breakspear

7 March 2023 34	Grimsby Town	1–1	Newport County	Cleethorpes
19:45 UTC	McAtee 55'	Report	Farquharson 36'	Stadium: Blundell Park; Attendance: 4,851; Referee: Bobby Madden

11 March 2023 35	Newport County	1–1	Bradford City	Newport
15:00 UTC	Ridehalgh 61' (o.g.)	Report	Cook 36'	Stadium: Rodney Parade; Attendance: 4,411; Referee: Sam Allison

14 March 2023 36	Newport County	1–1	Wimbledon	Newport
19:45 UTC	Charsley 69'	Report	Al-Hamadi 5'	Stadium: Rodney Parade; Attendance: 4,051; Referee: Tom Reeves

18 March 2023 37	Tranmere Rovers	1–3	Newport County	Birkenhead
15:00 UTC	Hendry 90+2'	Report	Wildig 25'; McNeill 30'; Kavanagh 82'	Stadium: Prenton Park; Attendance: 5,496; Referee: Darren Drysdale

1 April 2023 38	Colchester United	0–0	Newport County	Colchester
15:00 BST (UTC+1)		Report		Stadium: Colchester Community Stadium; Attendance: 3,086; Referee: Martin Woods

7 April 2023 39	Newport County	3–0	Northampton Town	Newport
15:00 BST (UTC+1)	Bogle 43'; Bogle 90+1' (pen.); McNeill 90+6'	Report		Stadium: Rodney Parade; Attendance: 4,982; Referee: Leigh Doughty

10 April 2023 40	Stockport County	4–0	Newport County	Stockport
15:00 BST (UTC+1)	Wootton 9', 45+3'; Stretton 65'; Knoyle 89'	Report		Stadium: Edgeley Park; Attendance: 9,179; Referee: Carl Brook

15 April 2023 41	Newport County	2–0	Hartlepool United	Newport
15:00 BST (UTC+1)	Bogle 17'; Demetriou 44'	Report		Stadium: Rodney Parade; Attendance: 4,521; Referee: Darren Handley

18 April 2023 42	Newport County	1–2	Mansfield Town	Newport
19:45 BST (UTC+1)	Wildig 86'	Report	Boateng 24'; Gale 73'	Stadium: Rodney Parade; Attendance: 3,575; Referee: Thomas Kirk

22 April 2023 43	Doncaster Rovers	1–3	Newport County	Doncaster
15:00 BST (UTC+1)	Hurst 12'	Report	Farquharson 64'; Wildig 71'; Norman 79'	Stadium: Eco-Power Stadium; Attendance: 5,490; Referee: Simon Mather

25 April 2023 44	Newport County	2–3	Harrogate Town	Newport
19:45 BST (UTC+1)	Bogle 3', 79'	Report	Folarin 5'; Thomson 9'	Stadium: Rodney Parade; Attendance: 3,710; Referee: Neil Hair

29 April 2023 45	Gillingham	1–2	Newport County	Gillingham
15:00 BST (UTC+1)	Nichols 17' (pen.)	Report	Norman 9'; Bogle 78'	Stadium: Priestfield Stadium; Attendance: 7,872; Referee: Craig Hicks

8 May 2023 46	Newport County	2–2	Crewe Alexandra	Newport
12:30 BST (UTC+1)	Bogle 77'; Bogle 90+1'	Report	Adebisi 56'; Brook 90+3'	Stadium: Rodney Parade; Attendance: 4,195; Referee: Anthony Backhouse

=== FA Cup ===
County were drawn at home to Colchester United in the first round and to the winners between Torquay United or Derby County in the second round.

Win Draw Loss Fixtures

5 November 2022 First round	Newport County	2–0	Colchester United	Newport
15:00 UTC	Kieran O'Hara 28' (o.g.); Lewis 76'	Report		Stadium: Rodney Parade; Attendance: 2,377; Referee: Bobby Madden

27 November 2022 Second round	Newport County	1–2	Derby County	Newport
15:15 UTC	Farquharson 41'	Report	Sibley 54'; McGoldrick 88'	Stadium: Rodney Parade; Attendance: 3,507; Referee: Anthony Backhouse

=== EFL Cup ===
Win Draw Loss Fixtures

Newport were drawn away to Luton Town in the first round and at home to Portsmouth in the second round.

9 August 2022 First round	Luton Town	2–3	Newport County	Luton
19:45 BST (UTC+1)	Mendes Gomes 30'; Lockyer 50'	Report	Collins 36'; Zimba 52'; Waite 76'	Stadium: Kenilworth Road; Attendance: 3,827; Referee: Ollie Yates

23 August 2022 Second round	Newport County	3–2	Portsmouth	Newport
19:45 BST (UTC+1)	Evans 14'; Wildig 49'; Waite 74'	Report	Curtis 9', 25'	Stadium: Rodney Parade; Attendance: 3,866; Referee: John Busby

8 November 2022 Third round	Leicester City	3–0	Newport County	Leicester
19:45 UTC	Justin 44'; Vardy 70', 82'	Report		Stadium: King Power Stadium; Attendance: 15,081; Referee: Darren Bond

=== EFL Trophy ===
On 20 June, the initial Group stage draw was made, grouping Newport County with Exeter City and Forest Green Rovers. Three days later, Southampton U21s joined Southern Group F. In the second round, Newport were drawn away to Milton Keynes Dons.

Pos	Div	Team	Pld	W	PW	PL	L	GF	GA	GD	Pts	Qualification
1	L1	Forest Green Rovers	3	3	0	0	0	9	3	+6	9	Advance to Round 2
2	L2	Newport County	3	2	0	0	1	5	4	+1	6	Advance to Round 2
3	L1	Exeter City	3	1	0	0	2	4	7	−3	3	
4	ACA	Southampton U21	3	0	0	0	3	3	7	−4	0	

Source: EFL.com

Win Draw Loss Fixtures

30 August 2022 Group stage	Exeter City	1–2	Newport County	Exeter
19:00 BST (UTC+1)	Chauke 52'	Report	Zimba 57'; Bogle 82'	Stadium: St James Park; Attendance: 1,902; Referee: Darren Drysdale

20 September 2022 Group stage	Newport County	1–2	Forest Green Rovers	Newport
19:45 BST (UTC+1)	Evans 90+2'	Report	Stevenson 69'; Fiabema 79'	Stadium: Rodney Parade; Attendance: 946; Referee: Lee Swabey

18 October 2022 Group stage	Newport County	2–1	Southampton U21s	Newport
19:45 BST (UTC+1)	Bogle 11' (pen.); Waite 60'	Report	Bellis 76'	Stadium: Rodney Parade; Attendance: 705; Referee: Darren Handley

22 November 2022 Round 2	Milton Keynes Dons	3–1	Newport County	Milton Keynes
19:00 UTC	Burns 27'; Dennis 59'; Grigg 77'	Report	Tucker 85' (o.g.)	Stadium: Stadium MK; Attendance: 635; Referee: Carl Brook
