= Aaron Lewis (footballer) =

Welsh footballer (born 1998)

Personal information
- Full name: Aaron James Lewis
- Date of birth: 26 June 1998 (age 28)
- Place of birth: Swansea, Wales
- Height: 1.83 m (6 ft 0 in)
- Positions: Full-back; midfielder

Team information
- Current team: Newport County
- Number: 18

Youth career
- 2007–2018: Swansea City

Senior career*
| Years | Team | Apps | (Gls) |
| 2018–2019 | Swansea City | 0 | (0) |
| 2019 | → Doncaster Rovers (loan) | 7 | (0) |
| 2019–2021 | Lincoln City | 2 | (1) |
| 2020–2021 | → Newport County (loan) | 1 | (0) |
| 2021–2023 | Newport County | 85 | (3) |
| 2023–2026 | Mansfield Town | 115 | (5) |
| 2026– | Newport County | 4 | (2) |

International career^{‡}
- Wales U19
| 2017 | Wales U20 | 2 | (0) |
| 2018–2020 | Wales U21 | 13 | (1) |
- * Club domestic league appearances and goals as of 14:42, 21 November 2026 (UTC) ‡ National team caps and goals as of 21:45, 17 November 2020 (UTC)

Aaron James Lewis (born 26 June 1998) is a Welsh professional footballer who plays as a full-back and midfielder for EFL League Two club Newport County.

== Early and personal life ==
Born in Swansea, Lewis is the nephew of former footballer Kenny Morgans.

== Club career ==
=== Swansea City ===
Lewis began his career with Swansea City at the age of 9, making three appearances for their under-23 team in the EFL Trophy during the 2016–17 season, four appearances (with one goal) for the under-21 team in the EFL Trophy during the 2017–18 season, and three appearances (with one goal) for the under-21 team in the EFL Trophy during the 2018–19 season.

He moved on loan to Doncaster Rovers in January 2019. He made his professional debut on 2 February 2019, in a 1–1 League draw away at Portsmouth. He was praised by Grant McCann for his performance in that match. He was released by Swansea in July 2019.

=== Lincoln City ===
On 10 August 2019 Lewis signed a short-term contract with Lincoln City, making his debut on 13 August in Lincoln's 1–0 EFL Cup win at Huddersfield. On 13 January 2020, Lewis signed a new 18-month contract with Lincoln, lasting until summer 2021.

On 16 October 2020, Lewis joined Newport County on loan until 2 January 2021. He made his debut for Newport on 12 December 2020 in the starting line-up for the 2–1 League Two defeat against Leyton Orient.

On 1 February 2021 it was announced he had left Lincoln by mutual consent.

=== Newport County ===
A day later Lewis returned to Newport County, signing a contract until the end of the 2020–21 season. He scored his first goal for Newport on 20 April 2021 in the 2–0 League Two win against Crawley Town. Lewis played for Newport in the League Two play-off final at Wembley Stadium on 31 May 2021 which Newport lost to Morecambe, 1–0 after a 107th-minute penalty. In June 2021 Lewis extended his Newport contract by a further two years.

He was offered a new contract by Newport at the end of the 2022–23 season, but he chose to leave the club.

=== Mansfield Town ===
After training with the club, he signed a two-year contract with Mansfield Town on 11 July 2023 with an option for a third year.

On 7 May 2025 the club announced it had triggered an extension to the player's contract. On 5 May 2026 it was announced that Lewis was among three players to be released by the club at the end of the season.

He then went on trial with Bradford City, but was not offered a contract.

=== Return to Newport County ===
Lewis signed for Newport County in September 2026.

== International career ==
In May 2017, Lewis was named in the Wales under-20 squad for the 2017 Toulon Tournament. He featured in two of Wales' three group matches, against the Ivory Coast and Bahrain as Wales were eliminated in the group stage.

Lewis has represented Wales at under-21 level, winning 13 caps.

== Playing style ==
Primarily a full-back, Lewis has also featured as a central midfielder.

== Career statistics ==
As of match played 21 November 2026

Appearances and goals by club, season and competition
| Club | Season | League | | | FA Cup | | League Cup | | Other | | Total | |
| Club | Season | Division | Apps | Goals | Apps | Goals | Apps | Goals | Apps | Goals | Apps | Goals |
|---|---|---|---|---|---|---|---|---|---|---|---|---|
| Swansea City U21/U23 | 2016–17 | — | | | — | | — | | 3 (Note: Appearance(s) in EFL Trophy) | 0 | 3 | 0 |
| Swansea City U21/U23 | 2017–18 | — | | | — | | — | | 4 | 1 | 4 | 1 |
| Swansea City U21/U23 | 2018–19 | — | | | — | | — | | 3 | 1 | 3 | 1 |
| Swansea City U21/U23 | Total | | 0 | 0 | 0 | 0 | 10 | 2 | 10 | 2 | | |
| Swansea City | 2018–19 | Championship | 0 | 0 | 0 | 0 | 0 | 0 | 0 | 0 | 0 | 0 |
| Doncaster Rovers (loan) | 2018–19 | League One | 7 | 0 | 0 | 0 | 0 | 0 | 0 | 0 | 7 | 0 |
| Lincoln City | 2019–20 | League One | 2 | 1 | 0 | 0 | 2 | 0 | 1 | 0 | 5 | 1 |
| Lincoln City | 2020–21 | League One | 0 | 0 | 0 | 0 | 0 | 0 | 0 | 0 | 0 | 0 |
| Lincoln City | Total | | 2 | 1 | 0 | 0 | 2 | 0 | 1 | 0 | 5 | 1 |
| Newport County (loan) | 2020–21 | League Two | 1 | 0 | 0 | 0 | 0 | 0 | 0 | 0 | 1 | 0 |
| Newport County | 2020–21 | League Two | 19 | 1 | 0 | 0 | 0 | 0 | 3 (Note: Appearances in EFL League Two play-offs) | 0 | 22 | 1 |
| Newport County | 2021–22 | League Two | 27 | 1 | 1 | 0 | 2 | 0 | 2 | 0 | 32 | 1 |
| Newport County | 2022–23 | League Two | 39 | 1 | 2 | 1 | 2 | 0 | 4 | 0 | 47 | 2 |
| Newport County | Total | | 85 | 3 | 3 | 1 | 4 | 0 | 9 | 0 | 101 | 4 |
| Mansfield Town | 2023–24 | League Two | 38 | 2 | 1 | 0 | 3 | 0 | 2 | 0 | 44 | 2 |
| Mansfield Town | 2024–25 | League One | 42 | 2 | 1 | 0 | 1 | 0 | 2 | 0 | 46 | 2 |
| Mansfield Town | 2025–26 | League One | 35 | 1 | 4 | 0 | 1 | 0 | 3 | 0 | 43 | 1 |
| Mansfield Town | Total | | 115 | 5 | 6 | 0 | 5 | 0 | 7 | 0 | 133 | 5 |
| Newport County | 2026–27 | League Two | 4 | 2 | 1 | 0 | 0 | 0 | 2 | 0 | 7 | 2 |
| Career total | | | 214 | 11 | 10 | 1 | 11 | 0 | 29 | 2 | 264 | 14 |

== Honours ==
Swansea City U23

- Premier League Cup: 2016–17

Mansfield Town

- EFL League Two third-place promotion: 2023–24
