= Mickey Demetriou =

English footballer (born 1990)

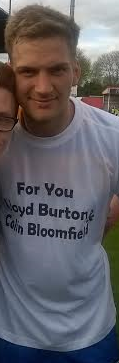
- Demetriou following Shrewsbury Town's promotion to League One in 2015

Personal information
- Full name: Michael David Demetriou
- Date of birth: 12 March 1990 (age 36)
- Place of birth: Worthing, England
- Height: 6 ft 2 in (1.88 m)
- Position: Defender

Team information
- Current team: Crewe Alexandra
- Number: 5

Senior career*
Years	Team	Apps	(Gls)
2006–2009	Worthing	36	(10)
2009–2010	Bognor Regis Town	42	(2)
2010–2011	Jerez Industrial		
2011	Eastbourne Borough	10	(0)
2011–2014	Kidderminster Harriers	108	(2)
2014–2016	Shrewsbury Town	43	(3)
2015	→ Cambridge United (loan)	15	(0)
2017–2023	Newport County	258	(26)
2023–	Crewe Alexandra	124	(13)

International career
2013–2014	England C	5	(0)
- * Club domestic league appearances and goals as of 14:01, 2 November 2026 (UTC)

Michael David Demetriou (born 12 March 1990) is an English footballer who plays as a defender for and captains EFL League Two club Crewe Alexandra. He has played internationally for England C.

== Club career ==
=== Early career ===
Demetriou began his career as a striker, playing for non-league sides Worthing and Bognor Regis Town. He was then invited to join the Glenn Hoddle Academy in Spain, where he was converted into a defender, and had a spell playing for Jerez Industrial.

=== Eastbourne Borough ===
On his return to England, Demetriou joined Eastbourne Borough on non-contract terms on 28 January 2011. He made his Conference debut the following day as an 82nd-minute substitute for Steven Masterton in a 1–1 home draw with Grimsby Town, and made nine more appearances over the season.

=== Kidderminster Harriers ===
After departing Eastbourne, Demetriou signed a one-year contract with fellow Conference team Kidderminster Harriers on 20 June 2011. He made his debut on 24 September, filling in for Jamille Matt for the final five minutes of a 2–1 win over Mansfield Town at Field Mill. On 7 February 2012, Demetriou extended his contract with Kidderminster until the end of the 2013–14 season.

He got his first goal on 4 September 2012, a last-minute equaliser away to Braintree Town via a 20-yard strike called a "stunner" by the Essex Chronicle. The following 12 January, he scored his only other goal for the Harriers, a free kick to open a 2–0 win in the season's trip to Mansfield.

=== Shrewsbury Town ===
Demetriou made the step up to the Football League, joining League Two side Shrewsbury Town on a free transfer following the expiry of his Kidderminster deal, on a two-year contract on 3 June 2014. He scored the winning goal on his debut, against Tranmere Rovers on 16 August 2014, and subsequently scored on two further occasions that season, an injury-time equaliser in a 2–1 win at Carlisle United, and a consolation against Northampton Town, as Shrewsbury lost by the same score and ended an unbeaten home record in the league.

Demetriou was a first-team regular Playing in the leftback / left wing back role as Shrewsbury won promotion back to League One at the first attempt, and also getting through to the 4th round of the League Cup. Their promotion was secured after a 1–0 away win at Cheltenham Town on 25 April 2015.

On 1 September 2015, Demetriou signed a half-season loan deal with League Two's Cambridge United. Hours later, he made his debut, playing the entirety of a 0–2 home defeat to Dagenham & Redbridge in the first round of the Football League Trophy and was awarded 'Man of the Match' by the official sponsors, an award he went on to win again during a number of appearances and also making The Football League's 'Team of the day' on a few occasions during his time there.

After returning to Shrewsbury, Demetriou made his first League One start of the season away to Millwall on 9 April 2016. When goalkeeper Mark Halstead was sent off with a minute remaining and no substitutions remained, Demetriou volunteered to take over in goal to face Lee Gregory's penalty; he guessed the right way but did not save it, and Shrewsbury lost 3–1. After picking up a knee injury (torn meniscus) just 10 minutes in to the same match, although playing the full 90 minutes on it he was later ruled out of action for the rest of the season. When he was subsequently released, he then broke his 5th metatarsal whilst at Fleetwood Town in the preseason of 2016 and was out of action until January 2017.

=== Newport County ===
On 10 January 2017, Demetriou joined League Two side Newport County on a contract until the end of the 2016–17 season. He made his Newport debut on 21 January 2017 as a second-half substitute in a 0–0 draw against Barnet in League Two and went on to make a further 16 appearances in the centre back / left sided centre half role. On 1 April 2017 he scored his first goal for Newport in a 1–0 win versus Crawley Town. Demetriou was selected as EFL League Two player of the Month for April 2017, scoring three goals and playing his part in the team that kept four clean sheets that month. Newport, who some deemed down and written off weeks previous, secured their safety from relegation on the last game of the season against Notts County to complete 'The Great Escape'. Demetriou scored a penalty in the 32nd minute of the match and County went on to win 2–1 with fellow central defender Mark O'Brien scoring the winner in the 89th minute.

In May 2017 Demetriou signed a two-year contract to remain at Newport County. Demetriou was part of the team that reached the League Two playoff final at Wembley Stadium on 25 May 2019. Newport lost to Tranmere Rovers, 1–0 after a goal in the 119th minute. He signed a further two-year contract in July 2019. Demetriou played for Newport in the League Two playoff final at Wembley Stadium on 31 May 2021 which Newport lost to Morecambe, 1–0 after a 107th-minute penalty. In June 2021 he signed a further two-year contract with Newport County.

In May 2023 Demetriou was selected as the PFA Community Champion for the 2022–23 season in recognition of his work with the local charity 'County in the Community'. He was offered a new contract by Newport at the end of the 2022–23 season but he chose to leave the club.

=== Crewe Alexandra ===
On 21 July 2023 Demetriou joined Crewe Alexandra on a one-year deal with an option for a further year. He made his Crewe debut on 5 August 2023, scoring in the Railwaymen's 2–2 opening home draw against Mansfield Town, then scoring twice against his former team-mates as Crewe beat Newport County 4–2 on 15 August 2023. In February 2024, Demetriou signed a new contract through to the summer of 2025, with an option for a further 12 months, and, following long-term injuries to Luke Offord and Chris Long, Demetriou was appointed club captain for the remainder of the season. In April 2024, Demetriou was named in the EFL League Two Team of the Year and, despite the return of Long from injury, Demetriou retained the captain's armband and led Crewe to the League Two play-offs in May, scoring Crewe's first goal in their semi-final victory at Doncaster Rovers, helping Crewe to a 2–2 aggregate score and then a 4–3 penalty shoot-out win. He scored 10 goals in 55 appearances, and earned a place in the League Two PFA Team of the Year.

In August 2024, Demetriou was named as Crewe's captain for the 2024–25 season. In March 2025, he signed a new one-year contract, with an option for a further year. On 28 February 2026, he played his 700th competitive fixture. On 19 March 2026, the club confirmed it had triggered an option to extend his contract until the end of 2026–27.

== International career ==
Demetriou has played internationally for England C, making his debut against Bermuda on 4 June 2013. In November 2014, Demetriou was approached by the Cyprus national football team, to whom he qualifies through a grandfather.

== Career statistics ==
As of match played 19 September 2026

Appearances and goals by club, season and competition
Club	Season	League			FA Cup		League Cup		Other		Total	
Club	Season	Division	Apps	Goals	Apps	Goals	Apps	Goals	Apps	Goals	Apps	Goals
Bognor Regis Town	2009–10	Isthmian League Premier Division	42	2	1	1	−		9 (Note: Five appearances in Sussex Senior Cup, two appearances in FA Trophy, two appearances in Isthmian League Cup)	0	52	3
Bognor Regis Town	Total		42	2	1	1	−		9	0	52	3
Eastbourne Borough	2010–11	Conference Premier	10	0	0	0	−		0	0	10	0
Kidderminster Harriers	2011–12	Conference Premier	26	0	0	0	−		0	0	26	0
Kidderminster Harriers	2012–13	Conference Premier	43	2	1	0	−		1 (Note: Appearance in Conference play-off)	0	45	2
Kidderminster Harriers	2013–14	Conference Premier	39	0	3	0	−		0	0	42	0
Kidderminster Harriers	Total		108	2	4	0	−		1	0	113	2
Shrewsbury Town	2014–15	League Two	42	3	3	0	3	0	1 (Note: Appearances in EFL Trophy)	0	49	3
Shrewsbury Town	2015–16	League One	1	0	−		0	0	0	0	1	0
Shrewsbury Town	Total		43	3	3	0	3	0	1	0	50	3
Cambridge United (loan)	2015–16	League Two	15	0	2	0	−		1	0	18	0
Newport County	2016–17	League Two	17	4	0	0	−		0	0	17	4
Newport County	2017–18	League Two	46	7	5	0	2	0	0	0	53	7
Newport County	2018–19	League Two	46	4	7	0	2	0	3 (Note: Appearances in the EFL League Two play-offs)	0	57	4
Newport County	2019–20	League Two	21	0	1	0	1	0	2	0	25	0
Newport County	2020–21	League Two	45	4	3	0	4	0	3	0	55	4
Newport County	2021–22	League Two	39	4	1	0	0	0	0	0	40	4
Newport County	2022–23	League Two	45	3	2	0	3	0	2	0	52	3
Newport County	Total		259	26	19	0	12	0	10	0	300	26
Crewe Alexandra	2023–24	League Two	46	8	3	1	2	0	4 (Note: One appearance in EFL Trophy, three appearances (and one goal) in League Two play-offs)	1	55	10
Crewe Alexandra	2024–25	League Two	35	2	1	0	1	0	0	0	37	2
Crewe Alexandra	2025–26	League Two	38	3	1	1	0	0	0	0	39	4
Crewe Alexandra	2026–27	League Two	5	0	0	0	2	0	0	0	7	0
Crewe Alexandra	Total		124	13	5	1	5	0	4	1	138	16
Career total			597	45	34	3	19	0	26	1	676	49

== Honours ==
Shrewsbury Town

- Football League Two second-place promotion: 2014–15

Individual

- EFL League Two Team of the Season: 2023–24
- Crewe Alexandra Supporters' Player of the Season: 2023–24
- Crewe Alexandra Players' Player of the Season: 2023–24
- PFA Team of the Year: 2023–24 League Two, 2024–25 League Two
