= Matthew Dolan (footballer) =

English footballer (born 1993)

Personal information
- Full name: Matthew Alexander Dolan
- Date of birth: 11 February 1993 (age 33)
- Place of birth: Hartlepool, England
- Height: 1.75 m (5 ft 9 in)
- Positions: Midfielder; defender

Team information
- Current team: Spennymoor Town
- Number: 29

Youth career
- Middlesbrough

Senior career*
Years	Team	Apps	(Gls)
2010–2014	Middlesbrough	0	(0)
2013	→ Yeovil Town (loan)	7	(1)
2013–2014	→ Hartlepool United (loan)	19	(2)
2014	→ Bradford City (loan)	11	(0)
2014–2015	Bradford City	13	(0)
2014	→ Hartlepool United (loan)	2	(0)
2015–2017	Yeovil Town	77	(7)
2017–2023	Newport County	175	(14)
2023	→ Hartlepool United (loan)	12	(0)
2023–2024	Hartlepool United	6	(0)
2024–	Spennymoor Town	85	(6)

Managerial career
- 2026: Spennymoor Town (joint-interim)
- * Club domestic league appearances and goals as of 20:18, 3 April 2026 (UTC)

Matthew Alexander Dolan (born 11 February 1993) is an English footballer who plays for National League North club Spennymoor Town.

Born in Hartlepool, Dolan started his career with Middlesbrough, signing his first professional contract in July 2010. He had a loan spell with Yeovil Town where he made an appearance in the 2013 Football League One play-off final win. Dolan then had a loan spell with his home town club Hartlepool United and then Bradford City. After leaving Middlesbrough in 2014, he signed permanently with Bradford where he would spend one season. After another loan spell with Hartlepool, he re-joined Yeovil Town. He departed Yeovil in 2017, signing for Newport County. Dolan spent six seasons with Newport, earning the Player of the Year award in his fourth. He also played in two unsuccessful League Two play-off finals for the club. After another loan spell with Hartlepool, he moved there permanently in 2023. He left Hartlepool in 2024, signing for Spennymoor Town.

== Career ==
=== Middlesbrough ===
Dolan began his career at Middlesbrough and in July 2010 was awarded a four-year professional contract with the club, and was captain of their U21 side.

On 4 January 2013, Dolan joined Football League One side Yeovil Town on a months loan deal, and made his debut as a substitute in their Football League Trophy area semi-final defeat against Leyton Orient. He played his first League One match for the club in the 2–0 win at Sheffield United. Dolan only managed five appearances for Yeovil in his first spell on loan before returning to the Riverside due to injury. On 27 March 2013, Dolan unexpectedly returned to Yeovil for a second loan spell this time until the end of the 2012–13 season. On 29 March 2013, Dolan made his first appearance of his second loan spell for Yeovil as a second-half substitute in a goalless draw against Walsall. On 1 April, he scored his first goal in professional football in the 2–1 away win at Notts County, with a goal scored direct from a free kick. Dolan appeared as a second-half substitute in the 2013 League One play-off final as Yeovil beat Brentford 2–1 to secure promotion to the Football League Championship. Dolan returned to Middlesbrough having made nine appearances for Yeovil, in all competitions, in a loan spell hampered by injuries.

In August 2013, Dolan joined his home-town team Hartlepool United on a one-month loan deal, linking up with former Middlesbrough coaches Colin Cooper and Craig Hignett. This loan was extended in October. Dolan then scored his first goal for the club, in a 3–1 win over AFC Wimbledon on 22 October 2013. This was followed up his second came on 26 December 2013, in a 1–1 draw against Chesterfield. In January, Dolan returned to Middlesbrough. He made 24 appearances in all competitions for Hartlepool, scoring twice.

Under the management of Aitor Karanka, Dolan was among the players to be offloaded as part of Karanka's reducing the squad size. So on 1 September 2014 Dolan agreed to join Bradford City on loan until the end of the season.

=== Bradford City ===
On 6 May 2014, Dolan agreed to join Bradford City on a one-year contract. He moved on loan to Hartlepool United on 27 November 2014. He made only two appearances for Pools when he was recalled to Bradford City due to an injury. Dolan struggled for game time with Bradford and made only 13 league appearances and was released at the end of the 2014–15 season.

=== Yeovil Town ===
Following his release from Bradford City, Dolan agreed to sign for League Two side Yeovil Town on a two-year deal from 1 July 2015 – the club he had previously played for on loan in 2013. On 8 August 2015, Dolan scored on his first game back for the club in a 3–2 defeat against Exeter City. He made headlines in August 2016 after he scored from inside his own half in a 2–1 EFL Cup win against Walsall. In his two years with Yeovil, Dolan played 94 times in all competitions and scored eight times.

=== Newport County ===
On 7 June 2017, Dolan rejected the offer of a new contract from Yeovil to sign for fellow League Two side Newport County on a two-year contract. He made his debut for Newport on the opening day of the 2017–18 season, in a 3–3 draw at Stevenage. On 10 November 2017, Dolan scored his first goal for Newport in the 1–1 draw against Port Vale in League Two. On 26 January 2019 Dolan scored the equalising goal in the 93rd minute against Championship club Middlesbrough in the FA Cup fourth round 1–1 draw. Newport won the replay 2–0 and progressed to the FA Cup fifth round home tie against reigning Premier League champions Manchester City. Manchester City won the match 4–1. Dolan scored the winning goal in the 2018–19 League Two play-off semi-final penalty shoot-out against Mansfield Town. In the League Two play-off final at Wembley Stadium on 25 May 2019, Dolan was a 72nd-minute substitute as Newport lost to Tranmere Rovers 1–0 after a goal in the 119th minute.

In June 2019, Dolan signed a two-year contract extension with Newport County. In April 2021, Dolan was named as the 2021 EFL League Two Player in the Community for his "exceptional attitude to County in the Community initiatives". Also in April 2021, Dolan extended his Newport contract until the end of the 2022–23 season. Dolan played for Newport in the League Two play-off final at Wembley Stadium on 31 May 2021 which Newport lost to Morecambe, 1–0 after a 107th-minute penalty. In June 2021 Dolan was selected as the Newport County Player of the Year for the 2020–21 season. He was released by Newport at the end of the 2022–23 season.

=== Hartlepool United ===
On 5 January 2023, Dolan moved on loan to Hartlepool United until the end of the 2022–23 season. At the end of the season, he signed for Pools on a permanent basis. On 15 February 2024, Dolan left Hartlepool United via mutual consent following the termination of his contract.

=== Spennymoor Town ===
On 15 February 2024, Dolan signed for National League North club Spennymoor Town. As part of his contract, Dolan would also take on a coaching role at the club's academy.

He scored his first goal for Spennymoor on the opening day of the 2024–25 season via a free kick from 30 yards in a 3–0 win against Chester. In April 2025, Dolan's looping cross provided the assist for Aidan Rutledge to equalise in the last minute against Rochdale in the FA Trophy semi-final; Dolan scored his penalty in the resulting shoot-out which saw Spennymoor advance to the final at Wembley – however, Spennymoor lost the final 3–0 to Aldershot Town. On 4 June 2025, he signed a new contract with The Moors.

== Coaching career ==
Upon signing as player for Spennymoor Town in February 2024, Dolan also began coaching in the club's academy.

On February 23, 2026, Dolan was named as joint-interim manager of Spennymoor alongside Tommy Miller until the end of the season. It was a role that Dolan combined alongside his playing role at the club. The duo won in their first game in charge in a 1–0 win against Chorley. In April 2026, it was announced that Dolan would remain as in a dual player-coach role with Spennymoor and had also been appointed the club's academy manager.

== Career statistics ==
As of match played 21 March 2026

Appearances and goals by club, season and competition
Club	Season	League			FA Cup		League Cup		Other		Total	
Club	Season	Division	Apps	Goals	Apps	Goals	Apps	Goals	Apps	Goals	Apps	Goals
Middlesbrough	2012–13	Championship	0	0	0	0	0	0	—		0	0
Middlesbrough	2013–14	Championship	0	0	0	0	0	0	—		0	0
Middlesbrough	Total		0	0	0	0	0	0	—		0	0
Yeovil Town (loan)	2012–13	League One	7	1	0	0	0	0	2 (Note: One appearance in Football League Trophy, one in League One play-offs)	0	9	1
Hartlepool United (loan)	2013–14	League Two	19	2	3	0	0	0	2 (Note: Appearance(s) in Football League Trophy)	0	24	2
Bradford City (loan)	2013–14	League One	11	0	0	0	0	0	0	0	11	0
Bradford City	2014–15	League One	13	0	1	0	2	0	1	0	17	0
Hartlepool United (loan)	2014–15	League Two	2	0	0	0	0	0	0	0	2	0
Yeovil Town	2015–16	League Two	39	3	3	0	1	0	4	0	47	3
Yeovil Town	2016–17	League Two	38	4	2	0	2	1	5 (Note: Appearance(s) in EFL Trophy)	0	47	5
Yeovil Town	Total		77	7	5	0	3	1	11	0	96	8
Newport County	2017–18	League Two	40	3	5	0	2	0	1	0	48	3
Newport County	2018–19	League Two	32	2	6	1	1	0	3 (Note: Appearance(s) in League Two play-offs)	0	42	3
Newport County	2019–20	League Two	22	0	3	0	2	0	7	1	34	1
Newport County	2020–21	League Two	38	6	2	0	3	0	3	1	46	7
Newport County	2021–22	League Two	33	2	0	0	1	0	2	0	36	2
Newport County	2022–23	League Two	10	1	1	0	1	0	3	0	15	1
Newport County	Total		175	14	17	1	10	0	19	2	221	17
Hartlepool United (loan)	2022–23	League Two	12	0	—		—		—		12	0
Hartlepool United	2023–24	National League	6	0	0	0	—		0	0	6	0
Spennymoor Town	2023–24	National League North	14	0	—		—		—		14	0
Spennymoor Town	2024–25	National League North	42	5	2	0	—		6 (Note: Appearances in FA Trophy)	1	50	6
Spennymoor Town	2025–26	National League North	29	1	3	0	—		1	1	33	1
Spennymoor Town	Total		85	6	5	0	—		7	1	97	7
Career total			407	30	31	1	15	1	42	3	495	35

== Managerial statistics ==
Managerial record by team and tenure
Team	From	To	Record				
Team	From	To	P	W	D	L	Win %
Spennymoor Town (joint-interim)	23 February 2026	27 April 2026	16	7	5	4	43.8
Total			16	7	5	4	43.8

== Honours ==
Yeovil Town

- Football League One play-offs: 2013

Spennymoor Town

- FA Trophy runner-up: 2024–25

Individual

- Newport County Player of the Year: 2020–21
