= Joe Day (footballer) =

English footballer (born 1990)

Personal information
- Full name: Joseph David Day
- Date of birth: 13 August 1990 (age 36)
- Place of birth: Brighton, England
- Height: 1.86 m (6 ft 1 in)
- Position: Goalkeeper

Team information
- Current team: Cheltenham Town (player/goalkeeping coach)
- Number: 1

Youth career
- Crystal Palace
- 2007–2008: Rushden & Diamonds

Senior career*
Years	Team	Apps	(Gls)
2008–2011	Rushden & Diamonds	33	(0)
2009	→ Brackley Town (loan)	2	(0)
2009	→ Harrow Borough (loan)	2	(0)
2011–2014	Peterborough United	4	(0)
2011–2012	→ Alfreton Town (loan)	15	(0)
2012	→ Eastbourne Borough (loan)	3	(0)
2014	→ Newport County (loan)	14	(0)
2015–2019	Newport County	197	(0)
2019–2021	Cardiff City	1	(0)
2020	→ AFC Wimbledon (loan)	9	(0)
2021	→ Bristol Rovers (loan)	18	(0)
2021–2024	Newport County	55	(0)
2023	→ Woking (loan)	2	(0)
2023–2024	→ Yeovil Town (loan)	39	(0)
2024–	Cheltenham Town	81	(0)
- * Club domestic league appearances and goals as of 22:16, 2 May 2026 (UTC)

Joseph David Day (born 13 August 1990) is an English professional footballer who plays as a goalkeeper for EFL League Two club Cheltenham Town where he also holds the role of goalkeeping coach.

== Career ==
=== Rushden & Diamonds ===
Day began his career with Crystal Palace before joining Rushden & Diamonds in 2007. After spending time out on loan at Harrow Borough Day established himself in the Rushden & Diamonds first team.

=== Peterborough United ===
Day joined Peterborough United in April 2011. He spent most of the 2011–12 season on loan at Alfreton Town. He made his Football League debut for Peterborough United on 18 January 2014 in a 3–0 win against Tranmere Rovers.

On 28 August 2014, Day joined League Two Newport County on a one-month loan, making his debut versus Portsmouth on 30 August 2014. Following some impressive displays the loan period was subsequently extended to 28 November 2014.

=== Newport County ===
On 29 December 2014, Newport County announced that they had agreed a full transfer with Peterborough United for Day for an undisclosed record transfer for the Welsh club with Day being contracted until the end of the 2016–17 season. Day was part of the Newport squad that completed the 'Great Escape' with a 2–1 victory at home to Notts County on the final day of the 2016–17 season, which ensured Newport's survival in League Two. On the 18 May 2017 Day signed a two-year contract to remain with Newport.

On 5 February 2019, whilst he was playing in a 2–0 FA Cup fourth round victory against Championship club Middlesbrough, Day's wife gave birth to twin daughters. Day said he knew that her waters had broken before the game, but he did not know she had given birth until after the match ended.

He was part of the team that reached the League Two play-off final at Wembley Stadium on 25 May 2019. Newport lost to Tranmere Rovers, 1–0 after a goal in the 119th minute.

=== Cardiff City ===
On 27 June 2019, Day signed a two-year deal with Cardiff City on a free transfer following the expiry of his contract at Newport. He made his debut on the opening day of the season in a 3–2 defeat to Wigan Athletic as a substitute in place of Neil Etheridge.

Day joined League One team AFC Wimbledon on a six-month loan deal on 28 January 2020. He made his Wimbledon debut against Accrington Stanley on 1 February 2020.

On 4 January 2021, Day joined League One side Bristol Rovers on loan until the end of the 2020–21 season. Day made his debut that weekend in a 3–2 FA Cup third round defeat to Sheffield United. Although Day made a number of good saves, he was unlucky when a header he tipped onto the bar came back down, hitting Day and going in, this own goal opening the scoring for the Premier League side.

Day was released by Cardiff City at the end of his contract at the end of the 2020–21 season.

=== Newport County return ===
On 11 June 2021, Day returned to former club Newport County, signing a three-year contract two years after he had left the club to join Cardiff City. He made his third debut for Newport on 7 August 2021 in the starting line-up for the 1–0 League Two win against Oldham Athletic. Day was released by Newport County at the end of the 2023–24 season.

==== Woking loan ====
On 28 July 2023, Day joined National League club Woking for the duration of the 2023–24 season.

==== Yeovil Town loan ====
On 1 September 2023, having been recalled from his loan at Woking, Day joined National League South side Yeovil Town on loan until the end of the 2023–24 season. In November 2023 Day was hospitalised with an infected spider bite on his head, forcing him to wear a protective headguard in Yeovil's FA cup tie against Gateshead.

=== Cheltenham Town ===
On 3 July 2024, Day joined League Two side Cheltenham Town, accepting the role of player/goalkeeping coach.

On 2 July 2025, Day signed a new two-year contract with the club.

== Career statistics ==
As of match played 10 November 2026

Appearances and goals by club, season and competition
Club	Season	League			FA Cup		League Cup		Other		Total	
Club	Season	Division	Apps	Goals	Apps	Goals	Apps	Goals	Apps	Goals	Apps	Goals
Rushden & Diamonds	2008–09	Conference Premier	0	0	0	0	—		3 (Note: Appearance(s) in Hillier Senior Cup)	0	3	0
Rushden & Diamonds	2009–10	Conference Premier	1	0	0	0	—		1	0	2	0
Rushden & Diamonds	2010–11	Conference Premier	32	0	2	0	—		2 (Note: Appearance(s) in FA Trophy)	0	36	0
Rushden & Diamonds	Rushden & Diamonds Total		33	0	2	0	—		6	0	41	0
Brackley Town (loan)	2008–09	SL Premier Division	2	0	0	0	—		0	0	2	0
Harrow Borough (loan)	2009–10	IL Premier Division	2	0	0	0	—		0	0	2	0
Peterborough United	2011–12	Championship	0	0	0	0	0	0	—		0	0
Peterborough United	2012–13	Championship	0	0	0	0	0	0	—		0	0
Peterborough United	2013–14	League One	4	0	0	0	0	0	0	0	4	0
Peterborough United	2014–15	League One	0	0	0	0	0	0	0	0	0	0
Peterborough United	Peterborough United Total		4	0	0	0	0	0	0	0	4	0
Alfreton Town (loan)	2011–12	Conference Premier	15	0	1	0	—		1	0	17	0
Eastbourne Borough (loan)	2012–13	Conference South	3	0	0	0	—		0	0	3	0
Newport County (loan)	2014–15	League Two	14	0	1	0	0	0	1 (Note: Appearance in Football League Trophy)	0	16	0
Newport County	2014–15	League Two	22	0	—		—		—		22	0
Newport County	2015–16	League Two	41	0	4	0	1	0	0	0	46	0
Newport County	2016–17	League Two	45	0	4	0	1	0	3 (Note: Appearance(s) in EFL Trophy)	0	53	0
Newport County	2017–18	League Two	46	0	5	0	2	0	1	0	54	0
Newport County	2018–19	League Two	43	0	6	0	0	0	3 (Note: Appearances in League Two play-offs)	0	52	0
Cardiff City	2019–20	Championship	1	0	0	0	1	0	—		2	0
Cardiff City	2020–21	Championship	0	0	0	0	0	0	—		0	0
Cardiff City	Cardiff City Total		1	0	0	0	1	0	—		2	0
AFC Wimbledon (loan)	2019–20	League One	9	0	—		—		—		9	0
Bristol Rovers (loan)	2020–21	League One	18	0	1	0	—		1	0	20	0
Newport County	2021–22	League Two	27	0	1	0	0	0	0	0	28	0
Newport County	2022–23	League Two	28	0	2	0	2	0	2	0	34	0
Newport County	2023–24	League Two	0	0	0	0	0	0	0	0	0	0
Newport County	Newport County Total		266	0	23	0	6	0	10	0	305	0
Woking (loan)	2023–24	National League	2	0	0	0	—		0	0	2	0
Yeovil Town (loan)	2023–24	National League South	39	0	5	0	—		1	0	45	0
Cheltenham Town	2024–25	League Two	35	0	2	0	1	0	6	0	44	0
Cheltenham Town	2025–26	League Two	46	0	3	0	2	0	1	0	52	0
Cheltenham Town	2026–27	League Two	0	0	0	0	1	0	3	0	4	0
Cheltenham Town	Cheltenham Town Total		81	0	5	0	4	0	10	0	100	0
Career total			475	0	37	0	11	0	29	0	552	0

== Honours ==
Peterborough United

- Football League Trophy: 2013–14

Yeovil Town

- National League South: 2023–24

Individual

- EFL League Two Player of the Month: April 2019
