= Sam Bowen (footballer, born 2001) =

Welsh footballer (born 2001)

Personal information
- Full name: Sam Lewis Bowen
- Date of birth: 14 January 2001 (age 25)
- Place of birth: Wales
- Position: Midfielder

Team information
- Current team: Gateshead
- Number: 8

Youth career
- 2007–2020: Cardiff City

Senior career*
| Years | Team | Apps | (Gls) |
| 2020–2022 | Cardiff City | 4 | (0) |
| 2020–2021 | → Barry Town United (loan) | 7 | (2) |
| 2022–2024 | Newport County | 7 | (0) |
| 2023–2024 | → Wealdstone (loan) | 40 | (6) |
| 2024–2026 | Solihull Moors | 25 | (4) |
| 2026– | Gateshead | 5 | (0) |

International career^{‡}
| 2017 | Wales U17 | 2 | (0) |
| 2018–2019 | Wales U19 | 7 | (1) |
| 2021– | Wales U21 | 3 | (0) |
- * Club domestic league appearances and goals as of 21 February 2026 ‡ National team caps and goals as of 14:57, 3 November 2021 (UTC)

Sam Lewis Bowen (born 14 January 2001) is a Welsh professional footballer who plays as a midfielder for Gateshead. He is a former Wales under-21 international.

== Club career ==
=== Cardiff City ===
Bowen began his career as a youth player with Cardiff City. Having joined the club's academy at the age of six, he went on to captain the under-18 side before being named as an unused substitute for FA Cup ties against Carlisle United and Reading in January 2020. He signed for Cymru Premier side Barry Town United on loan in October 2020, making his debut in a 0–0 draw with Connah's Quay Nomads. He appeared seven times for Barry, scoring twice, before returning to Cardiff in January 2021 following the suspension of the Cymru Premier due to the COVID-19 pandemic.

Bowen made his professional debut for Cardiff during a 2–0 defeat against Brighton & Hove Albion in the EFL Cup on 24 August 2021. He made his league debut three weeks later in a 2–1 win over Nottingham Forest.

=== Newport County ===
On 25 May 2022 it was announced that Bowen would join Newport County on a permanent contract for an undisclosed transfer fee when the transfer window opened on 10 June 2022. He made his debut for Newport on 30 July 2022 in the starting line up for the 1–1 League Two draw against Sutton United.

On 10 August 2023, Bowen signed for National League club Wealdstone on a season-long loan deal.

Bowen was released by Newport County at the end of the 2023-24 season.

=== Solihull Moors ===
The 23-year-old arrived at Damson Park on a two-year deal following the expiry of his contract of Newport County. He was the teams first signing of the summer.

Upon signing for Solihull, Bowen expressed his emotions by saying: "I'm really excited, it's been on the horizon now for a couple of weeks. I'm buzzing to get going and I can't wait for pre-season to start now!"

"I like to get on the ball, be creative and try and score a few goals. Defensively, I like to think I'm pretty good at reading the game."

=== Gateshead ===
On 14 January 2026 Bowen joined National League club Gateshead on a short term deal until the end of the 2025-26 season.

== Personal life ==
Bowen is the son of former Wales international footballer Jason Bowen. He has an older brother, Jaye, who was also an academy player at Cardiff City.

== Career statistics ==
As of match played 28 October 2023

Appearances and goals by club, season and competition
| Club | Season | League | | | FA Cup | | EFL Cup | | Other | | Total | |
| Club | Season | Division | Apps | Goals | Apps | Goals | Apps | Goals | Apps | Goals | Apps | Goals |
|---|---|---|---|---|---|---|---|---|---|---|---|---|
| Cardiff City | 2021–22 | Championship | 4 | 0 | 0 | 0 | 1 | 0 | — | | 5 | 0 |
| Barry Town United (loan) | 2020–21 | Cymru Premier | 7 | 2 | 0 | 0 | 0 | 0 | — | | 7 | 2 |
| Newport County | 2022–23 | League Two | 7 | 0 | 0 | 0 | 3 | 0 | 4 (Note: Appearance(s) in EFL Trophy) | 0 | 14 | 0 |
| Wealdstone (loan) | 2023-24 | National League | 16 | 5 | 0 | 0 | 0 | 0 | — | | 16 | 5 |
| Career total | | | 34 | 7 | 0 | 0 | 4 | 0 | 4 | 0 | 42 | 7 |
