= Lewis Collins (footballer) =

Welsh footballer (born 2001)

Personal information
- Full name: Lewis Rhys Collins
- Date of birth: 9 May 2001 (age 25)
- Place of birth: Newport, Wales
- Position: Striker

Youth career
- Newport County

Senior career*
Years	Team	Apps	(Gls)
2017–2023	Newport County	87	(5)
2023	→ Torquay United (loan)	15	(3)
2023–2024	Torquay United	36	(1)
2025-	Eltham Redbacks FC	25	(7)

International career^{‡}
2017	Wales U17	2	(0)
2018	Wales U19	8	(1)
2020	Wales U21	2	(0)
- * Club domestic league appearances and goals as of 22:14, 30 January 2025 (UTC) ‡ National team caps and goals as of 16:12, 10 October 2020 (UTC)

Lewis Rhys Collins (born 9 May 2001) is a Welsh professional footballer who plays as a forward for Australian club Eltham Redbacks FC.

== Playing career ==
Collins came through the Newport County youth team to make his first team debut on 7 November 2017, in a 2–1 defeat to Cheltenham Town in an EFL Trophy group stage match at Rodney Parade.

He signed a two-year professional contract with Newport in May 2019.

On 24 August 2019, Collins made his Football League debut for Newport in a 1–0 win against Crewe Alexandra as a second-half substitute. On 4 September 2019, he scored his first goal for Newport in the 5–4 defeat to West Ham United Under-21s in the EFL Trophy Southern Group E. Collins played for Newport in the League Two playoff final at Wembley Stadium on 31 May 2021 which Newport lost to Morecambe, 1-0 after a 107th minute penalty. On 11 June 2021 Collins signed a two-year contract extension with Newport County.

On 31 January 2023 Collins joined Torquay United on loan for the remainder of the 2022-23 season.

He was released by Newport at the end of the 2022-23 season and joined Torquay United in June 2023 on a one-year contract. Collins was released by Torquay at the end of the 2023-24 season. In 2025 Collins joined Australian club Eltham Redbacks.

== International ==
In March 2018 Collins was called up to the Wales Under 19 Squad for the European Championship match versus Croatia in Zagreb. On 9 October 2020 Collins made his debut for the Wales Under 21 team in the Euro 2021 qualification defeat to Belgium.

== Personal life ==
Lewis is the younger brother of professional footballer Aaron Collins. The brothers were on opposing sides for the first time on 18 May 2021 for the EFL League Two play off first leg match at Rodney Parade in their home city of Newport, Wales. Aaron as a striker for Forest Green Rovers and Lewis as a striker for Newport County. Newport won the match 2–0 with Lewis scoring the second goal. Aaron scored in the second leg, a 4-3 win for Forest Green.

== Career statistics ==
As of match played 15 August 2023

Appearances and goals by club, season and competition
Club	Season	League			FA Cup		EFL Cup		Other		Total	
Club	Season	Division	Apps	Goals	Apps	Goals	Apps	Goals	Apps	Goals	Apps	Goals
Newport County	2017–18	League Two	0	0	0	0	0	0	1 (Note: Appearance(s) in the Football League Trophy)	0	1	0
Newport County	2018–19	League Two	0	0	0	0	0	0	1	0	1	0
Newport County	2019–20	League Two	6	0	1	0	1	0	5	1	13	1
Newport County	2020–21	League Two	16	1	1	0	3	0	4 (Note: One appearance in the EFL Trophy, three appearances and one goal in League Two play-offs)	1	24	2
Newport County	2021–22	League Two	17	1	1	0	1	0	2	0	21	1
Newport County	2022–23	League Two	18	0	2	0	3	1	4	0	27	1
Newport County	Total		57	2	5	0	8	1	17	2	87	5
Torquay United (loan)	2022–23	National League	15	3	—		—		1 (Note: Appearance(s) in the FA Trophy)	0	16	3
Torquay United	2023–24	National League South	3	0	0	0	—		0	0	3	0
Career total			75	5	5	0	8	1	18	2	106	8
