= Nathan Moriah-Welsh =

Guyanese footballer (born 2002)

Personal information
- Full name: Nathan Daniel Moriah-Welsh
- Date of birth: 18 March 2002 (age 24)
- Place of birth: Chelsea, England
- Height: 1.72 m (5 ft 8 in)
- Position: Midfielder

Team information
- Current team: Mansfield Town
- Number: 22

Youth career
- Old Isleworthians
- Chelsea
- Brentford
- 2017–2018: Reading
- 2018–2022: AFC Bournemouth

Senior career*
Years	Team	Apps	(Gls)
2022–2024	AFC Bournemouth	0	(0)
2022–2023	→ Newport County (loan)	38	(3)
2024–2025	Hibernian	31	(0)
2025–	Mansfield Town	29	(1)

International career^{‡}
2021–	Guyana	28	(3)
- * Club domestic league appearances and goals as of 21 February 2026 ‡ National team caps and goals as of 18 November 2025

Nathan Daniel Moriah-Welsh (born 18 March 2002) is a professional footballer who plays as a midfielder for EFL League One club Mansfield Town and the Guyana national team.

== Club career ==
=== Early career ===
Born in Chelsea, Moriah-Welsh had spells with Brentford and Reading, before joining Bournemouth in the summer of 2018.

=== AFC Bournemouth ===
Moriah-Welsh debuted for the under-21s in April 2019 while training alongside the first team. He was named in the match day squad for the first time in the FA Cup quarter-final tie with Southampton in March 2021. He made his first start and first team appearance for the club in the FA Cup third round, a 3–1 away win against Yeovil Town.

==== Newport County (loan) ====
On 10 August 2022, Moriah-Welsh joined EFL League Two club Newport County on loan for the 2022–23 season. He made his debut for the club on 16 August 2022 as a second-half substitute in a 3–2 league defeat to Salford City. He scored his first goal for the club on 20 August in a 2–1 league win against Tranmere Rovers.

=== Hibernian ===
Moriah-Welsh moved to Scottish club Hibernian for an undisclosed fee on 27 January 2024. He made his debut for the club on 3 February 2024, in a 3–0 defeat to St Mirren. He scored his first goal for the club on 27 July 2024, in a 4–0 win against Peterhead in the Scottish League Cup.

=== Mansfield Town ===
Moriah-Welsh returned to English football on 27 June 2025, joining League One side Mansfield Town for an undisclosed fee. He made his debut for the club on 2 August 2025, in a 2–1 defeat to Burton Albion. He scored his first goal for the club on 30 August 2025, in a 1–1 draw with Lincoln City.

== International career ==
Born in England, Moriah-Welsh was also eligible to represent Guyana and Grenada in international football. He chose to play for Guyana after having talks with their national team's head scout.

Moriah-Welsh received his first call-up to Guyana national team in March 2021 for World Cup qualifying matches against Trinidad and Tobago and Bahamas. He made his international debut on 30 March 2021 in a 4–0 win against Bahamas.

== Career statistics ==
=== Club ===
As of match played on 21 February 2026

Appearances and goals by club, season and competition
Club	Season	League			National cup (Note: Includes FA Cup, Scottish Cup)		League cup (Note: Includes EFL Cup, Scottish League Cup)		Other		Total	
Club	Season	Division	Apps	Goals	Apps	Goals	Apps	Goals	Apps	Goals	Apps	Goals
AFC Bournemouth	2021–22	Championship	0	0	2	0	0	0	—		2	0
AFC Bournemouth	2022–23	Premier League	0	0	0	0	0	0	—		0	0
AFC Bournemouth	2023–24	Premier League	0	0	0	0	0	0	—		0	0
AFC Bournemouth	Total		0	0	2	0	0	0	0	0	2	0
Newport County (loan)	2022–23	League Two	38	3	2	0	2	0	4 (Note: Appearances in EFL Trophy)	0	46	3
Hibernian	2023–24	Scottish Premiership	14	0	2	0	0	0	—		16	0
Hibernian	2024–25	Scottish Premiership	17	0	2	0	5	1	—		24	1
Hibernian	Total		31	0	4	0	5	1	0	0	40	1
Mansfield Town	2025–26	League One	29	1	3	0	2	0	3	0	37	1
Career total			98	4	11	0	9	1	7	0	123	5

=== International ===
As of match played 18 November 2025

Appearances and goals by national team and year
National team	Year	Apps	Goals
Guyana	2021	4	0
Guyana	2022	6	1
Guyana	2023	4	2
Guyana	2024	8	0
Guyana	2025	6	0
Total		28	3

Scores and results list Guyana's goal tally first, score column indicates score after each Moriah-Welsh goal.

List of international goals scored by Nathan Moriah-Welsh
No.	Date	Venue	Opponent	Score	Result	Competition
1	11 June 2022	Synthetic Track and Field Facility, Leonara, Guyana	Haiti	2–5	2–6	2022–23 CONCACAF Nations League
2	17 October 2023	SKNFA Technical Center, Basseterre, Saint Kitts and Nevis	Puerto Rico	1–1	3–1	2023–24 CONCACAF Nations League
3	21 November 2023	Félix Sánchez Olympic Stadium, Santo Domingo, Dominican Republic	Antigua and Barbuda	3–0	6–0	2023–24 CONCACAF Nations League
