= Cameron Norman =

English footballer (born 1995)

Personal information
- Full name: Cameron Pearce Norman
- Date of birth: 12 October 1995 (age 31)
- Place of birth: Norwich, England
- Height: 6 ft 2 in (1.88 m)
- Position: Defender

Team information
- Current team: Newport County
- Number: 22

Youth career
- 2010–2014: Norwich City

Senior career*
Years	Team	Apps	(Gls)
2014–2016	Norwich City	0	(0)
2015–2016	→ Woking (loan)	27	(1)
2016	Norwich United	8	(1)
2016–2017	Concord Rangers	12	(1)
2017	Needham Market	6	(0)
2017–2018	King's Lynn Town	45	(3)
2018–2019	Oxford United	7	(0)
2019–2021	Walsall	62	(0)
2021–2023	Newport County	92	(6)
2023–2024	Milton Keynes Dons	40	(0)
2024–2026	Tranmere Rovers	79	(6)
2026–	Newport County	15	(1)
- * Club domestic league appearances and goals as of 14:52, 21 November 2026 (UTC)

Cameron Pearce Norman (born 12 October 1995) is an English professional footballer who plays as a defender for EFL League Two club Newport County.

== Club career ==
=== Norwich City ===
Born in Norwich, Norman joined Norwich City at the age of 10 and was promoted to the under-18 squad as a scholar two years later. A key figure during their FA Youth Cup campaign in 2013, in which Norwich beat Chelsea to win the competition for the first time in 30 years, Norman went on to sign his first professional contract in May 2014.

On 29 October 2015, Norman joined National League side Woking on a one-month loan deal and made his professional debut during their 1–0 away defeat against Kidderminster Harriers two days later. Following several loan extensions, Norman became a regular in Woking's starting eleven and scored his first goal for the club during their emphatic 2–1 away victory over Forest Green Rovers, which ended Forest Green's hopes of an automatic promotion place.

On 10 June 2016, following his return from Woking, it was announced that Norman would leave Norwich at the expiration of his current deal.

=== Non-League ===
Following his release from Norwich, Norman had spells at Norwich United, Concord Rangers and Needham Market, before joining Southern League Premier Division side King's Lynn Town in August 2017. On the opening day of the season, he made his debut during their 2–0 home victory over Gosport Borough, playing the full 90 minutes. Following an impressive start to the season, his form attracted the interest of many National League and Football League sides. Following an impressive debut season with King's Lynn, in which Norman had featured fifty-one times, scoring seven goals, it was announced that he would leave the club in May 2018.

=== Oxford United ===
On 18 May 2018, following his departure from King's Lynn, Norman made the move to League One side Oxford United. He made his debut in a first-round EFL Cup win over Coventry City on 14 August and his league debut in a home defeat to Accrington Stanley a week later.

=== Walsall ===
Norman transferred to Walsall for an undisclosed fee during the January 2019 transfer window. He scored his first goal for Walsall when he scored in an EFL Trophy tie against Forest Green Rovers on 12 November 2019.

=== Newport County ===
On 4 June 2021, he signed a two-year deal with Newport County. He made his debut for Newport on 7 August 2021 in the starting line-up for the 1–0 League Two win against Oldham Athletic. Norman scored his first goal for Newport on 25 January 2022 in the 1–0 League Two win against Leyton Orient. In May 2022 Norman was selected as Newport County Player of the Year for the 2021–22 season and again in May 2023 as Player of the Year for the 2022–23 season. In June 2023 Norman announced he had left Newport County after rejecting Newport's offer to extend his contract beyond the 2022-23 season.

=== Milton Keynes Dons ===
On 16 June 2023, Norman signed for newly-relegated League Two club Milton Keynes Dons on a free transfer effective from 1 July 2023. He made his debut for the club in the opening game of the 2023–24 season on 5 August 2023, in a 5–3 away win over Wrexham.

=== Tranmere Rovers ===
On 27 June 2024, Norman agreed to join Tranmere Rovers on a two-year deal, officially joining the club following the expiry of his contract with Milton Keynes Dons on 1 July 2024. On 12 May 2026, the club announced he would be leaving in the summer once his contract expired.

=== Return to Newport County ===
On 24 June 2026, Norman agreed to return to League Two club Newport County on a free transfer effective from 1 July 2026.

== Career statistics ==
As of 21 November 2026

Appearances and goals by club, season and competition
Club	Season	League			FA Cup		EFL Cup		Other		Total	
Club	Season	Division	Apps	Goals	Apps	Goals	Apps	Goals	Apps	Goals	Apps	Goals
Norwich City	2015–16	Premier League	0	0	0	0	0	0	—		0	0
Woking (loan)	2015–16	National League	27	1	0	0	—		4 (Note: Appearance(s) in FA Trophy)	0	31	1
Concord Rangers	2016–17	National League South	12	1	—		—		0	0	12	1
King's Lynn Town	2017–18	SL Premier Division	45	3	2	2	—		4 (Note: One appearance and one goal in Southern League Cup, one appearance in FA Trophy, two appearances and one goal in Southern League Premier Division play-offs)	2	51	7
Oxford United	2018–19	League One	7	0	2	0	2	0	1 (Note: Appearance(s) in the EFL Trophy)	0	12	0
Walsall	2018–19	League One	9	0	—		—		—		9	0
Walsall	2019–20	League Two	18	0	1	0	1	0	4	1	24	1
Walsall	2020–21	League Two	35	0	1	0	1	0	2	0	39	0
Walsall	Total		62	0	2	0	2	0	6	1	72	1
Newport County	2021–22	League Two	46	1	1	0	0	0	0	0	47	1
Newport County	2022–23	League Two	46	5	2	0	3	0	2	0	53	5
Newport County	Total		92	6	3	0	3	0	2	0	100	6
Milton Keynes Dons	2023–24	League Two	40	0	1	0	1	0	1 (Note: One appearance in the 2023–24 EFL League Two play-offs)	0	43	0
Tranmere Rovers	2024–26	League Two	41	3	1	0	2	0	3	0	47	3
Tranmere Rovers	2025–26	League Two	38	3	1	0	1	0	3	0	43	3
Tranmere Rovers	Total		79	6	2	0	3	0	6	0	90	6
Newport County	2026–27	League Two	15	1	1	0	1	0	0	0	17	1
Career total			379	18	13	2	112	0	24	3	438	23

== Honours ==
Individual

- Newport County Player of the Year: 2021–22, 2022–23
