= Omar Bogle =

English footballer (born 1993)

Personal information
- Full name: Omar Hanif Bogle
- Date of birth: 26 July 1993 (age 33)
- Place of birth: Sandwell, England
- Height: 6 ft 3 in (1.91 m)
- Position: Striker

Team information
- Current team: Truro City
- Number: 10

Youth career
- 2007–2009: West Bromwich Albion
- 2009–2011: Birmingham City
- 2011–2012: Celtic

Senior career*
Years	Team	Apps	(Gls)
2012	Hinckley United	8	(3)
2012–2015	Solihull Moors	111	(62)
2015–2017	Grimsby Town	68	(32)
2017	Wigan Athletic	14	(3)
2017–2020	Cardiff City	21	(4)
2018	→ Peterborough United (loan)	9	(1)
2018–2019	→ Birmingham City (loan)	15	(1)
2019	→ Portsmouth (loan)	12	(4)
2020	→ ADO Den Haag (loan)	5	(1)
2020–2021	Charlton Athletic	17	(2)
2021–2022	Doncaster Rovers	27	(3)
2022	Hartlepool United	20	(5)
2022–2024	Newport County	71	(24)
2024–2026	Crewe Alexandra	46	(6)
2026–	Truro City	3	(2)

International career^{‡}
2014	England C	1	(1)
- * Club domestic league appearances and goals as of 23:46, 5 September 2026 (UTC) ‡ National team caps and goals as of 14:11, 23 May 2023 (UTC)

Omar Hanif Bogle (born 26 July 1993) is an English professional footballer who plays for National League South club Truro City.

A youth product of West Bromwich Albion, Birmingham City and Celtic, Bogle made his senior debut for Hinckley United in 2012. He then played three years for Solihull Moors, winning the Conference North Player of the Year and the Golden Boot in 2014–15. Bogle moved to Grimsby Town at the start of the 2015–16 season, helping them win promotion to League Two by scoring two goals in the 2016 play-off final. Following a stint at Wigan Athletic, he moved to Cardiff City in 2017 before being released in 2020. He then played for Charlton Athletic, Doncaster Rovers, Hartlepool United, Newport County and Crewe Alexandra before joining Truro City in August 2026.

Bogle is a former England C international.

== Early life ==
Bogle was born in Sandwell, West Midlands. He attended Holy Trinity C of E primary school and then Menzies High School, which later became The Phoenix Collegiate.

Bogle started his career with West Bromwich Albion's youth system before moving to the Birmingham City academy, appearing for their reserve team when only just 16 years old. Released by Birmingham, he played in Rangers U17's "Play on the pitch game" in April 2011, scoring a brace against Dunfermline Athletic. Bogle moved to Celtic's academy in September 2011, and played for Celtic Under 19's team in the European Next-Gen Series. He then returned south in March 2012, to pursue regular first team football.

== Club career ==
=== Hinckley United ===
Bogle signed for Conference North side Hinckley United in March 2012. He made his debut on 19 March 2012 in a 1–3 home defeat against Solihull Moors. He scored his first goal for the club against Vauxhall Motors on 24 March 2012. On 9 April 2012, he pulled a goal back in the 1–3 home defeat against Bishop's Stortford On 15 April 2012, he scored an equalising goal 11 minutes from time in the 1–1 stalemate at Worcester City.

Bogle departed The Knitters in July 2012, having made 8 appearances and scoring 3 goals during his time at De Montfort Park.

=== Solihull Moors ===
On 7 July 2012, Bogle signed for Conference North side with Solihull Moors. He made his debut for Solihull on 18 August 2012 in a 3–1 away defeat at Colwyn Bay. On 21 August 2012, he provided an assist for Darryl Knights, followed by his first goal for the club, in a 3–0 victory against Corby Town.

On 24 September 2012, he scored an equaliser in the 37th minute, against Midland Football Alliance side Westfields in the FA Cup second round. On 26 September 2012, he scored an 89th-minute winner in the second round FA Cup replay against Westfields.

Bogle scored a brace in the third round qualifying of the 2012–13 FA Trophy to secure a 2–1 victory against AFC Fylde on 10 November 2012, followed by another goal in the FA Trophy against Hednesford Town. He also appeared in the FA Trophy second round against Conference Premier side Wrexham, which ended in a 3–2 defeat for Solihull.

Bogle spent a trial for a week with Championship side AFC Bournemouth in July 2013, where he went on a pre-season training camp in Switzerland and played against FC Zürich, however his trial wasn't progressed any further. He then signed up again with Solihull for the upcoming 2013–14 season.

Three games into the 2014–15 season on 16 August 2014, Bogle scored his first two goals in an away game against Stalybridge Celtic. On 20 December 2014, Bogle scored a hat-trick in a 4–1 victory over Colwyn Bay. Bogle's final league goal for the 2014–15 season was a late penalty in a 2–2 draw with AFC Fylde.

While at Solihull Moors, Bogle won the Conference North's player of the year award for the 2014–15 season, whilst he also won the golden boot award having scored 29 league goals across the season.

=== Grimsby Town ===
==== 2015–16 season ====
Bogle joined National League side Grimsby Town on 15 June 2015 on a three-year contract for an undisclosed fee. Prior to signing, he was surrounded by transfer speculation with numerous clubs reportedly scouting him, Grimsby had outbid a £10,000 sum by Nuneaton Town which was rejected by Solihull. Grimsby Town also fended off interest from Gateshead to sign Bogle. Milton Keynes Dons and Port Vale in League One were also confirmed in March 2015 to be weighing up a move for him. He made his full debut on 8 August against Kidderminster, and he scored his first goal for Grimsby three days later in a 4–1 home win over Barrow.

On 8 May 2016, Bogle scored an extra-time goal in a 2–0 win against Braintree Town in the second leg of their National League play-off match; the victory saw Grimsby overturn a 1–0 first-leg deficit and secure their place in the National League promotion final against Forest Green Rovers. Bogle scored two goals in Grimsby's 3–1 victory over Forest Green in the 2016 National League play-off final at Wembley Stadium, seeing Grimsby promoted to League Two after a six-year absence from the Football League.

==== 2016–17 season ====
Bogle made his League Two professional debut with Grimsby on 6 August 2016, coming off the subs bench in the opening game of the season, a 2–0 win over Morecambe. His first goal came on his full debut on 16 August 2016, in the 3–2 defeat at Colchester; blasting a left footed shot from 18-yards in the second-minute of stoppage time.

Bogle won the PFA Fans' League Two Player of the Month award for August and September 2016. He was also named in the EFL Team of the Week in August, September, October (twice), and November 2016.

In January 2017, Championship side Rotherham United had three separate bids turned down by Grimsby for Bogle, a further bid by the club was also rejected. Premier League sides Hull and Swansea joined the race, along with Championship pair Norwich and Reading for his signature.

=== Wigan Athletic ===
On 31 January 2017, Bogle signed for Championship side Wigan Athletic on a two-and-a-half-year deal for an undisclosed fee; this included a number of additional potential financial benefits for Bogle's former clubs if Wigan maintained their Championship status in the current season, or returned to the Premier League. Bogle made his first appearance for the club on 3 February in a 1–0 defeat against Sheffield Wednesday, coming off the bench to replace Will Grigg in the 67th minute. His first two goals for Wigan came during his full debut on 7 February in a 2–2 draw at home to Norwich City. Bogle scored his third and final goal of the 2016–17 Championship campaign from the penalty spot in a 2–1 defeat at Queens Park Rangers.

=== Cardiff City ===
On 17 August 2017, Bogle signed for Championship side Cardiff City on a three-year deal for an officially undisclosed fee, although Cardiff manager Neil Warnock later stated that the transfer fee was £700,000. His debut came five days later in a 2–1 loss over Burton Albion in the EFL Cup. Making his first league start for The Bluebirds, Bogle scored his first goal for the club in a 3–1 win over Ipswich Town on 31 October, shortly followed by his second 5 days later against Bristol City, before being sent off in the Severnside Derby. Upon his return he scored the third goal in a 3–1 win over Norwich City.

On 1 February, Bogle joined Peterborough United on loan until the end of the 2017–18 season. He scored his first goal for Peterborough in a 2–1 win over Walsall on 27 February 2018. He was released by Cardiff at the end of the 2019–20 season.

On 7 August 2018, Bogle joined Birmingham City on a season-long loan. He made his debut as a second-half substitute in a 1–0 defeat away to Middlesbrough, and made three league starts during August. However, as Che Adams began to develop a productive partnership with Lukas Jutkiewicz – both had ten goals by mid-December – Bogle became increasingly peripheral, losing his place on the bench to youngster Beryly Lubala. According to manager Garry Monk, not having spent pre-season with Birmingham had made it difficult for Bogle; "he was just so eager to score a goal when he first came in and that probably distracted from the other work that needed to be done." He worked hard to regain a place on the bench, and scored his first goal for the club on 26 December with a shot from distance to secure a 2–0 home win against Stoke City.

Bogle's loan at Birmingham was cancelled by mutual agreement on 28 January 2019, and later that day he joined Portsmouth of League One on loan until the end of the season. He scored on his debut the next day in a defeat away to Luton Town, and produced an equaliser against Doncaster Rovers on his Fratton Park home debut in his next match.

On 31 January 2020, Bogle joined Eredivisie club ADO Den Haag on loan until the end of the season.

=== Charlton Athletic ===
On 9 October 2020, Bogle joined Charlton Athletic. He scored his first goal for Charlton in a 2–0 win against Ipswich Town on 28 November.

=== Doncaster Rovers ===
On 29 January 2021, Bogle joined Doncaster Rovers on an 18-month deal from League One rivals Charlton Athletic having only spent half a season at the south London-based club. He scored his first goal for Doncaster in a 3–3 draw against Hull City on 20 February. After falling out of contention with new manager Richie Wellens, Bogle was transfer listed and urged by Wellens to find a new club having been told he was not in his plans for the season. On 23 August, it was reported by Wellens that Bogle had rejected a move to Bradford City. On 9 September, Grimsby Town manager Paul Hurst, who had previously managed him in his former spell at Blundell Park, confirmed that the club had made contact with Bogle's agent about re-signing him but was told that Bogle did not want to join The Mariners. It was stated that Bogle was training on his own away from the first team, though Wellens refuted allegations he had been exiled from the club.

Following the sacking of Wellens in December, Bogle returned to first team duties following the appointment of Gary McSheffrey as his replacement.

=== Hartlepool United ===
On 27 January 2022, Bogle signed for Hartlepool United on a two-and-a-half-year contract. On 8 February 2022, Bogle scored his first Hartlepool goal in his home debut in a 3–1 win against Barrow. Bogle's early performances for Hartlepool earned him the PFA EFL League Two Player of the Month for February 2022.

=== Newport County ===
On 30 June 2022, Bogle signed a two-year contract with Newport County for an undisclosed fee. He scored on his debut for Newport on 30 July 2022 in the starting line up for the 1–1 League Two draw against Sutton United. Bogle finished the 2022–23 season as Newport's top scorer with 19 goals in all competitions. Bogle was released by Newport County at the end of the 2023–24 season,

=== Crewe Alexandra ===
On 5 July 2024, Bogle signed for Crewe on a two-year contract. He made his Crewe debut on 31 August 2024, coming on as a second-half substitute in Crewe's 2–1 league win at Bromley, and scored his first Crewe goal three days later in a 4–1 EFL Trophy defeat at Blackpool. In December 2025 Bogle revealed he had overcome addiction to painkillers and alcohol; he had become reliant upon prescription drugs after using them following a back injury in 2024.

On 13 May 2026, the club said he would be released in the summer when his contract expired.

=== Truro City ===
On 27 August 2026, Bogle signed for Truro City on a one-year contract.

== International career ==
Bogle was born in England and is of Ghanaian descent. Bogle was selected and called up to the England C team in 2014, to play against the Estonia U23s. On 18 November 2014, Bogle opened the scoring after just four minutes and nodded down for Harry Beautyman to score the second. He was substituted midway through the second half.

== Style of play ==
Bogle primarily plays as a central striker. According to his Solihull Moors team-mate Darren Byfield, speaking in 2014, "he can dribble, hold the ball up, scores headers, scores with his right foot, scores with his left foot. He's got it all."

== Personal life ==
Bogle writes music in his spare time, stating that it helps him vent.

== Career statistics ==
As of match played 5 September 2026

Appearances and goals by club, season and competition
Club	Season	League			FA Cup		EFL Cup		Other		Total	
Club	Season	Division	Apps	Goals	Apps	Goals	Apps	Goals	Apps	Goals	Apps	Goals
Hinckley United	2011–12	Conference North	8	3	—		—		—		8	3
Solihull Moors	2012–13	Conference North	41	15	0	0	—		3 (Note: Appearances in FA Trophy)	3	44	18
Solihull Moors	2013–14	Conference North	29	18	1	1	—		0	0	30	19
Solihull Moors	2014–15	Conference North	41	29	0	0	—		1	0	42	29
Solihull Moors	Total		111	62	1	1	—		4	3	116	66
Grimsby Town	2015–16	National League	41	13	4	1	—		8 (Note: Five appearances and two goals in FA Trophy, three appearances and three goals in National League play-offs)	5	53	19
Grimsby Town	2016–17	League Two	27	19	1	0	1	0	1 (Note: Appearance(s) in EFL Trophy)	0	30	19
Grimsby Town	Total		68	32	5	1	1	0	9	5	83	38
Wigan Athletic	2016–17	Championship	14	3	—		—		0	0	14	3
Cardiff City	2017–18	Championship	10	3	1	0	1	0	—		12	3
Cardiff City	2018–19	Premier League	0	0	0	0	0	0	—		0	0
Cardiff City	2019–20	Championship	11	1	0	0	1	0	—		12	1
Cardiff City	Total		21	4	1	0	2	0	—		24	4
Peterborough United (loan)	2017–18	League One	9	1	0	0	0	0	0	0	9	1
Birmingham City (loan)	2018–19	Championship	15	1	0	0	1	0	—		16	1
Portsmouth (loan)	2018–19	League One	12	4	—		—		2 (Note: One appearance in EFL Trophy, one in EFL League One play-offs)	0	14	4
ADO Den Haag (loan)	2019–20	Eredivisie	5	1	—		—		—		5	1
Charlton Athletic	2020–21	League One	17	2	0	0	0	0	0	0	17	2
Doncaster Rovers	2020–21	League One	17	2	—		—		—		17	2
Doncaster Rovers	2021–22	League One	10	1	0	0	1	0	0	0	11	1
Doncaster Rovers	Total		27	3	0	0	1	0	0	0	28	3
Hartlepool United	2021–22	League Two	20	5	1	0	—		1	0	22	5
Newport County	2022–23	League Two	46	17	2	0	2	0	4	2	54	19
Newport County	2023–24	League Two	25	7	3	1	1	0	3	0	32	8
Newport County	Total		71	24	5	1	3	0	7	2	86	27
Crewe Alexandra	2024–25	League Two	30	5	1	0	—		1	1	32	6
Crewe Alexandra	2025–26	League Two	16	1	0	0	—		1	2	17	3
Crewe Alexandra	Total		46	6	1	0	3	0	2	3	49	9
Truro City	2026–27	National League South	3	2	0	0	—		0	0	3	2
Career total			446	152	14	3	8	0	25	13	493	168

== Honours ==
Grimsby Town

- National League play-offs: 2016
- FA Trophy runner-up: 2015–16

Cardiff City

- EFL Championship runner-up: 2017–18

Portsmouth

- EFL Trophy: 2018–19

Individual

- Conference North Golden Boot: 2014–15
- Conference North Player of the Year: 2014–15
- Conference North Team of the Year: 2014–15
