= Lewys Twamley =

Welsh footballer (born 2003)

Personal information
- Full name: Lewys Morgan Twamley
- Date of birth: 26 August 2003 (age 23)
- Place of birth: Cardiff, Wales
- Height: 1.68 m (5 ft 6 in)
- Position: Midfielder

Team information
- Current team: Southend United
- Number: 11

Youth career
- 2009-2014: Cardiff City
- 2014–2020: Newport County

Senior career*
Years	Team	Apps	(Gls)
2020–2023	Newport County	0	(0)
2022	→ Salisbury (loan)	10	(0)
2022	→ Pontypridd United (loan)	19	(0)
2023–2025	Merthyr Town	50	(21)
2025	Yeovil Town	9	(0)
2025–2026	Merthyr Town	46	(16)
2026–	Southend United	6	(0)

International career^{‡}
2021	Wales U18	1	(0)
- * Club domestic league appearances and goals as of 16 September 2026 (UTC) ‡ National team caps and goals as of 23:07, 30 August 2021 (UTC)

Lewys Morgan Twamley (born 26 August 2003) is a Welsh professional footballer who plays as a midfielder for National League club Southend United.

== Club career ==
Twamley made his debut for Newport County on 8 September 2020 as a second-half replacement for Ryan Haynes in the 1–0 EFL Trophy defeat to Cheltenham Town. In June 2021 he signed his first professional contract with Newport County. On 10 January 2022 Twamley joined Salisbury on loan for the remainder of the 2021–22 season. On 2 August 2022, he joined Pontypridd United on loan until 3 January 2023.

He was released by Newport at the end of the 2022–23 season.

Twamley signed for Merthyr Town on 30 September 2023.

On 16 January 2025, Twamley signed for National League side Yeovil Town on a deal until the summer of 2026. On 22 July 2025, Twamley departed Yeovil Town following the mutual termination of his contract.

Following his release from Yeovil, Twamley returned to National League North side Merthyr Town on 23 July 2025.

=== Southend United ===
On 28 June 2026, it was announced that Twamley had signed a two-year contract with National League club Southend United, with an option for a third year.

== International career ==
Twamley made his Wales Under-18 debut in the 2–0 friendly match defeat against England on 29 March 2021 as a second-half substitute. In August 2021 he was called up to the Wales under 19 team.

== Career statistics ==
As of match played 8 August 2026

Appearances and goals by club, season and competition
Club	Season	League			National cup (Note: Includes FA Cup, Welsh Cup)		League cup (Note: Includes Welsh League Cup)		Other		Total	
Club	Season	Division	Apps	Goals	Apps	Goals	Apps	Goals	Apps	Goals	Apps	Goals
Newport County	2020–21	League Two	0	0	0	0	0	0	3 (Note: Appearance(s) in EFL Trophy)	0	3	0
Newport County	2021–22	League Two	0	0	0	0	0	0	1	0	1	0
Newport County	2022–23	League Two	0	0	0	0	0	0	0	0	0	0
Newport County	Total		0	0	0	0	0	0	4	0	4	0
Salisbury (loan)	2021–22	SL Premier Division South	10	0	0	0	—		1 (Note: Appearance in Wiltshire Premier Shield)	0	11	0
Pontypridd United (loan)	2022–23	Cymru Premier	19	0	2	3	2	1	—		23	4
Merthyr Town	2023–24	SL Premier Division South	26	6	1	0	—		2 (Note: Appearance(s) in FA Trophy)	1	29	7
Merthyr Town	2024–25	SL Premier Division South	24	15	2	1	3	0	1	0	30	16
Merthyr Town	Total		50	21	3	1	3	0	3	1	59	23
Yeovil Town	2024–25	National League	9	0	—		—		—		9	0
Merthyr Town	2025–26	National League North	46	16	2	0	—		1	0	49	16
Southend United	2026–27	National League	1	0	0	0	—		0	0	1	0
Career total			135	37	7	4	5	1	9	1	156	43

== Honours ==
Individual

- National League North Team of the Season: 2025–26
