= Priestley Farquharson =

English footballer (born 1997)

Personal information
- Full name: Priestley Tyler Heginbottom Farquharson
- Date of birth: 15 March 1997 (age 29)
- Place of birth: Halifax, England
- Height: 6 ft 3 in (1.91 m)
- Position: Centre-back

Team information
- Current team: Crawley Town
- Number: 6

Youth career
- Wycombe Wanderers

Senior career*
Years	Team	Apps	(Gls)
- Hitchin Town
2016	Hayes & Yeading United	1	(0)
2017	Billericay Town		
2017	→ Bishop's Stortford (loan)	2	(0)
2017–2019	Hayes & Yeading United	35	(0)
2019–2021	Connah's Quay Nomads	43	(5)
2021–2023	Newport County	54	(4)
2023–2026	Walsall	49	(6)
2026–	Crawley Town	12	(0)

International career
2014–2018	England (beach soccer)	61	(14)
- * Club domestic league appearances and goals as of 17:25, 8 November 2026 (UTC)

Priestley Tyler Heginbottom Farquharson (born 15 March 1997) is an English professional footballer who plays as a centre-back for EFL League Two club Crawley Town. He has been capped by the England national beach soccer team.

== Early and personal life ==
Farquharson was born in Halifax, West Yorkshire, and raised in London. He was released by Wycombe Wanderers as a teenager before working as a barman and spending four years with the England national beach soccer team, earning 61 caps and representing his country at the 2018 Euro Beach Soccer League Superfinal. He attended Brunel University and was captain of their football team.

== Career ==
=== Early career ===
Farquharson played English non-league football for Hitchin Town, Billericay Town, Hayes & Yeading United and Bishop's Stortford before signing for Cymru Premier side Connah's Quay Nomads in January 2019. At Connah's Quay Nomads he was part of the 2019–20 squad which won the Welsh League Cup and Cymru Premier double, with Farquharson being named the League's Young Player of the Season in 2020.

=== Newport County ===
On 21 January 2021 Farquharson signed a two-and-a-half-year contract with League Two Newport County for an undisclosed fee. He made his debut for Newport as a second-half substitute in the 1–0 League Two win against Grimsby Town on 6 February 2021. Farquharson played for Newport in the League Two playoff final at Wembley Stadium on 31 May 2021 which Newport lost to Morecambe, 1–0 after a 107th-minute penalty. He suffered a knee injury at the end of the 2021–22 season. In August 2022 he was praised by Newport manager James Rowberry. He scored his first two goals for Newport in the League Two 2–0 win against Gillingham on 19 November 2022. He was offered a new contract by Newport at the end of the 2022–23 season.

=== Walsall ===
In June 2023 it was announced that Farquharson would sign for Walsall on 1 July 2023. He signed a one-year contract extension in June 2025. He was released by Walsall at the end of the 2025–26 season.

=== Crawley Town ===
Farquharson signed a two-year deal with Crawley Town in June 2026, with effect from 1 July 2026.

== Career statistics ==
As of match played 8 November 2026

Appearances and goals by club, season and competition
Club	Season	League			National Cup (Note: Appearances in Welsh Cup and FA Cup)		League Cup (Note: Appearances in Welsh League Cup and English League Cup)		Other		Total	
Club	Season	Division	Apps	Goals	Apps	Goals	Apps	Goals	Apps	Goals	Apps	Goals
Connah's Quay Nomads	2018–19	Welsh Premier League	7	0	2	0	0	0	1 (Note: Appearance in Scottish Challenge Cup)	0	10	0
Connah's Quay Nomads	2019–20	Cymru Premier (Note: The league was rebranded as the Cymru Premier for the 2019–20 season)	21	2	1	0	1	0	5 (Note: Two appearances in Scottish Challenge Cup and three appearances in UEFA Europa League)	0	28	2
Connah's Quay Nomads	2020–21	Cymru Premier	15	3	0	0	0	0	2 (Note: One appearance in UEFA Champions League and one appearance in UEFA Europa League)	0	17	3
Connah's Quay Nomads	Total		43	5	3	0	1	0	8	0	55	5
Newport County	2020–21	League Two	13	0	—		—		3 (Note: Appearance in League Two play-offs)	0	16	0
Newport County	2021–22	League Two	10	0	0	0	1	0	0	0	11	0
Newport County	2022–23	League Two	31	4	2	1	3	0	2 (Note: Appearance(s) in Football League Trophy)	0	38	5
Newport County	Total		54	4	2	1	4	0	5	0	65	5
Walsall	2023–24	League Two	18	1	3	0	0	0	0	0	21	1
Walsall	2024–25	League Two	3	0	0	0	0	0	0	0	3	0
Walsall	2025–26	League Two	28	5	2	0	1	0	4	0	35	5
Walsall	Total		49	6	5	0	1	0	4	0	59	6
Crawley Town	2026–27	League Two	12	0	1	0	1	0	1	0	15	0
Career total			158	15	11	1	7	0	18	0	194	16

== Honours ==
Connah's Quay Nomads

- Cymru Premier: 2019–20, 2020–21
- Welsh League Cup: 2019–20

Individual

- Cymru Premier Young Player of the Year: 2019–20
