= 2019 EFL League Two play-off final =

- The match took place at Wembley Stadium.
Newport County	Tranmere Rovers
0	1
- After extra time
- Date: 25 May 2019
- Venue: Wembley Stadium, London
- Referee: Ross Joyce
- Attendance: 25,217
- Weather: 22 °C (72 °F) (sunny)

The 2019 EFL League Two play-off final was an association football match which was played on 25 May 2019 at Wembley Stadium, London, between Newport County and Tranmere Rovers to determine the third and final team to gain promotion from EFL League Two to EFL League One. The top three teams of the 2018–19 EFL League Two season gained automatic promotion to League One, while those placed from fourth to seventh place in the table took part in play-off semi-finals; the winners of these semi-finals competed for the final place for the 2019–20 season in League One.

The game, which was refereed by Ross Joyce, was played on a warm sunny day in front of a crowd of 25,217. After a goalless first half, Newport's captain Mark O'Brien was sent off after receiving a second yellow card in the final minute of the second half. The match went into extra time and one minute before full time, Tranmere's Connor Jennings scored with a header following a cross from Jake Caprice. The match ended 1–0 to Tranmere which secured them back-to-back promotions.

In their following season, foreshortened by the COVID-19 pandemic in the United Kingdom, Tranmere finished 21st in League One and were relegated back to League Two. Newport's next season saw them finish in 15th position in the League Two table.

== Route to the final ==
EFL League Two final table, leading positions
Pos	Team	Pld	W	D	L	GF	GA	GD	Pts
1	Lincoln City	46	23	16	7	73	43	+30	85
2	Bury	46	22	13	11	82	56	+26	79
3	Milton Keynes Dons	46	23	10	13	71	49	+22	79
4	Mansfield Town	46	20	16	10	69	41	+28	76
5	Forest Green Rovers	46	20	14	12	68	47	+21	74
6	Tranmere Rovers	46	20	13	13	63	50	+13	73
7	Newport County	46	20	11	15	59	59	0	71

Tranmere Rovers finished the regular 2018–19 season in sixth place in EFL League Two, the fourth tier of the English football league system, one place ahead of Newport County. Both therefore missed out on the three automatic places for promotion to EFL League One and instead took part in the play-offs to determine the fourth promoted team. Tranmere finished six points behind Milton Keynes Dons and Bury (who were promoted in third and second place respectively) and twelve behind league winners Lincoln City. Newport County ended the season two points behind Tranmere Rovers.

Newport faced Mansfield Town in their play-off semi-final. The first leg took place at Newport's home ground, Rodney Parade, on 9 May 2019. Mansfield took the lead early in the first half following combined play from Jacob Mellis and Danny Rose which allowed CJ Hamilton to strike the ball into the roof of Newport's net at the near post. Despite Mansfield's first-half dominance, Newport applied pressure in the second half, with a 70th minute strike from Robbie Willmott being disallowed for offside. Mansfield goalkeeper Conrad Logan had made a number of second-half saves before bringing down Adebayo Azeez and conceding a penalty late in the game. Azeez's strike was saved by Logan before Pádraig Amond converted the rebound, and the game ended 1–1. The second leg of the semi-final was played three days later at Field Mill in Mansfield. Newport dominated the first half, striking the Mansfield crossbar twice, but failed to convert any of their chances as it ended goalless. The second half was a more even competition but saves from both goalkeepers ensured the match ended 0–0 in regular time, forcing the tie into extra time. The Newport goalkeeper Joe Day saved a Tyler Walker shot while Regan Poole blocked Rose's shot on the line. With no goals in extra time, the tie went to a penalty shootout. Day then saved Walker's spot kick while Newport converted all of theirs to win 5–3 in the shootout and progress to the final.

The second play-off semi-final saw Tranmere Rovers take on Forest Green Rovers with the first leg being held at Prenton Park in Tranmere on 10 May 2019. Forest Green's Gavin Gunning was sent off for kicking out at Jay Harris. In the 25th minute, Ollie Banks' strike from 25 yards (23 m) scored via the underside of the Forest Green bar. The home side dominated possession and James Norwood missed four chances to extend their lead but the match ended 1–0. The semi-final second leg took place at The New Lawn three days later. A headed goal from Forest Green's Joseph Mills early in the first half levelled the tie on aggregate before Norwood put Tranmere back into the lead with a volley on 27 minutes. Carl Winchester was sent off for the home side after being shown a second yellow card and Tranmere held on to secure the draw, and the 2–1 aggregate victory.

== Match ==
=== Background ===
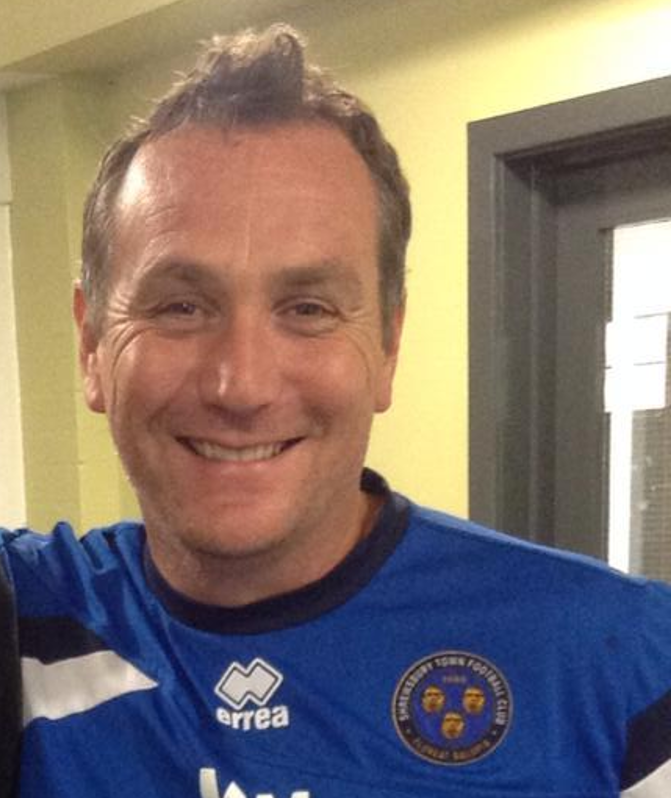
Tranmere's manager Micky Mellon had led Tranmere to promotion to League Two the previous season.

Tranmere had last played in the third tier of English football in 2014 while Newport had never played at that level. Tranmere were making their first appearance in a fourth tier play-off final, but had featured in the Football League Third Division play-offs twice, losing the 1990 final 2–0 to Notts County and winning the following year's final 1–0 against Bolton Wanderers in extra time. Having been promoted into the EFL through the 2018 National League play-off final, Tranmere were aiming to win back-to-back promotions. Newport had been promoted to the EFL for the first time in their history when they won the 2013 Conference Premier play-off final 2–0 against Wrexham. Coming into the final, Newport had gone on an unbeaten 12-match run while Tranmere had failed to win any of their last four games. Tranmere's squad included Norwood, League Two's Golden Boot winner with 29 goals, and goalkeeper Scott Davies, the league's Golden Glove winner. Amond and Matt had scored 43 goals in all competitions during the season for Newport.

During the regular season, Newport had won 1–0 against Tranmere at Prenton Park in September 2018 and both clubs played out a goalless draw the following April. The referee for the match was Ross Joyce, assisted by Nik Barnard and Rob Smith, with Eddie Ilderton acting as the fourth official and Matthew Lee the reserve assistant referee. Neither team were changed from their play-off semi-final second legs, with Newport's Jamille Matt recovering from a leg injury. There was no clear favourite to win with different bookmakers supporting both Tranmere and Newport. Newport manager Michael Flynn noted prior to the game that there was "a lot of experience between the two squads at Wembley, which is quite surreal for League Two players. They have got a few good players – it is not just about James Norwood. We have to concentrate on what we can do as well." His counterpart, Micky Mellon, said: "First and foremost we just want to get the performance right and hopefully that will be enough to help us to the next level. I think the experience of being here before will definitely help us but we still have to give the performance. We have to go and express ourselves. It should be a good battle." Both English and Welsh national anthems were performed by soprano Emily Haig. Newport played in their traditional amber and black kit while Tranmere wore their white and blue home strip.

=== First half ===
Newport kicked the match off in front of a Wembley Stadium crowd of 25,217 at around 3 p.m. in sunny conditions and a temperature of 22 °C (72 °F). Inside a minute, Matt's header from a Mickey Demetriou long throw was off target for Newport. In the seventh minute, a 30-yard (27 m) shot from Tranmere's Connor Jennings was saved by Day in the Newport goal. Sid Nelson then handled the ball and the resulting free kick was flicked on by Amond with Matt narrowly missing the ball at the far post. Three minutes later Jennings' curling shot went over the Newport goal. In the 16th minute, a long-range strike from Scot Bennett flew over Tranmere's crossbar. Midway through the half, David Perkins sent a ball through for the overlapping defender Jake Caprice who crossed to Norwood. The Tranmere striker struck a first time volley which was saved by Day, before the teams took their first-half drinks break. On 31 minutes, Nelson hesitated in defence and conceded which was almost converted by Mark O'Brien at the far post after Newport had made an initial clearance. With less than ten minutes of the half remaining, Day saved a low Perkins strike from around 20 yards (18 m). In the 43rd minute, Perkins broke from midfield for Tranmere and passed to Harris whose cross was headed over the Newport goal by Norwood, and the half ended goalless.

=== Second half ===
Connor Jennings (pictured in 2012) scored the only goal of the game.

No changes were made by either side during the half-time interval and Tranmere kicked off the second half. In the 50th minute, Willmott's pass found Josh Sheehan whose shot was blocked by Monthe and Nelson. Three minutes later, Tranmere made the first substitution of the match, with Ben Pringle coming on to replace Harris. In the 55th minute, Matt received the first yellow card of the game for impeding the Tranmere goalkeeper Davies as he tried to release the ball early after saving a Dan Butler free kick. A minute later Day tipped a high cross from Pringle over the bar. Joss Labadie then shot wide for Newport before Tranmere's Liam Ridehalgh saw his free kick strike the defensive wall and cleared. In the 67th minute, O'Brien received the second yellow card of the game after a foul on Jennings. Soon after, Kieron Morris was brought down by Butler in the Newport box but the referee waved away the penalty appeals. In the 72nd minute, Newport made their first substitution of the match with Matthew Dolan coming on to replace Labadie. Two minutes later a cross from Butler was allowed to bounce in the Tranmere penalty area but Matt's low header was tipped onto the post by Davies. Perkins was then booked for a push on Newport's Dolan before Steve McNulty replaced Morris in Tranmere's second substitution of the game. With four minutes remaining, Monthe was brought down by Matt in the Tranmere penalty area but no penalty was awarded. In the last minute of regular time, Newport were reduced to ten men: O'Brien clashed with Norwood, and the Newport captain was sent off for a second yellow card. Three minutes into injury time, Banks played in Norwood but his shot was wide. After five minutes of added time, the second half was brought to an end, still goalless, forcing the match into extra time.

=== Extra time ===
Tyreeq Bakinson became Newport's third substitute when he came on to replace Sheehan at the start of the first period of extra time. In a half of few chances, Tranmere's appeal for a penalty was denied with five minutes remaining when Norwood was brought down by Demetriou. Three minutes later, Newport made their third substitution with Matt being replaced by Azeez. A minute later, Davies made a comfortable save from a Willmott header and a subsequent chance from Amond. After a minute of injury time, the half was brought to an end with the score remaining 0–0. Before the start of the second half of extra time, Newport made their fourth and final substitution, Keanu Marsh-Brown coming on for Willmott. Within a minute of his introduction, Marsh-Brown's shot was saved by Davies. Norwood then went close, denied once again by Davies, before Banks' free kick was struck high over the Newport crossbar. Two minutes later, Poole's foul on Jennings earned him a yellow card. In the 115th minute, Tranmere made their third substitution, with Adam Buxton coming on to replace Nelson. With three minutes of regular extra time remaining, Norwood's header from a Banks cross was saved by Day. In the 119th minute, the deadlock was broken as Tranmere took the lead through Jennings. Buxton beat Bakinson to create space and sent Caprice down the right wing. His cross to the back post went beyond Norwood but the unmarked Jennings headed the ball past Day to make it 1–0 to Tranmere. Two minutes of injury time were played during which Newport had a free kick which came to nothing, and the match ended with Tranmere victorious, winning back-to-back promotions.

=== Details ===
25 May 2019
15:00 BST (UTC+1)

Newport County	0–1 (a.e.t.)	Tranmere Rovers
		Jennings 119'

Wembley Stadium, London
Attendance: 25,217
Referee: Ross Joyce

Newport County	Tranmere Rovers

GK	1	Joe Day
CB	26	Regan Poole	(yellow card) 112'
CB	25	Mark O'Brien (c)	(yellow card) 67' (yellow-red card) 89'
CB	28	Mickey Demetriou
RM	7	Robbie Willmott		(substituted off) 105'
CM	4	Joss Labadie		(substituted off) 72'
CM	17	Scot Bennett
LM	3	Dan Butler
AM	16	Josh Sheehan		(substituted off) 90'
CF	9	Pádraig Amond
CF	11	Jamille Matt	(yellow card) 55'	(substituted off) 103'
Substitutes:
DF	2	David Pipe
MF	8	Matt Dolan		(substituted in) 72'
MF	10	Keanu Marsh-Brown		(substituted in) 105'
MF	15	Tyreeq Bakinson		(substituted in) 103'
MF	22	Andrew Crofts		(substituted in) 90'
FW	14	Ade Azeez
FW	27	Harry McKirdy
Manager:
Michael Flynn

GK	1	Scott Davies (c)
RB	14	Jake Caprice
CB	4	Sid Nelson		(substituted off) 115'
CB	6	Manny Monthé
LB	3	Liam Ridehalgh
DM	17	David Perkins	(yellow card) 77'
DM	8	Jay Harris		(substituted off) 53'
RM	19	Kieron Morris		(substituted off) 82'
LM	11	Connor Jennings
AM	28	Ollie Banks
CF	10	James Norwood
Substitutes
GK	25	Luke Pilling
DF	2	Adam Buxton		(substituted in) 115'
DF	5	Steve McNulty		(substituted in) 82'
MF	22	Harvey Gilmour
MF	27	Ben Pringle		(substituted in) 53'
FW	9	Paul Mullin
FW	29	Chris Dagnall
Manager:
Micky Mellon

Assistant referees:
Nik Barnard
Rob Smith
Fourth official:
Eddie Ilderton
Reserve assistant referee:
Matthew Lee

Match rules

- 90 minutes
- 30 minutes of extra time if necessary
- Penalty shoot-out if scores still level
- Seven named substitutes
- Maximum of three substitutions, with a fourth allowed in extra time

Statistics
	Newport County	Tranmere Rovers
Possession	47%	53%
Total shots	22	23
Shots on target	5	6
Corner kicks	3	6
Fouls committed	18	20
Yellow cards	3	1
Red cards	1	0

== Post-match ==
Winning goalscorer Jennings said: "We gave everything and we knew it was coming. To get back to back promotions is some achievement." Mellon noted: "Let’s give every credit to both sets of players – Newport kept fighting. I’m absolutely delighted – the players gave me everything they had since Christmas and we're absolutely made up." His opposite number Flynn bemoaned the refusal of Joyce to use VAR to review Monthe's challenge on Matt late in the second half: "We are at the home of football. We have all the VAR equipment. You’ve got referees who are full-time referees and a big decision killed us. It was a stonewall penalty and I can't believe it wasn't given ... It's a very poor decision ... If they are not going to use all the facilities at hand, what’s the point of having it here?". Mellon's response was laconic: "I'm not going to bother with VAR, I just got promoted."

Leagues One and Two were prematurely curtailed as a result of the COVID-19 pandemic in the United Kingdom. In their following season, Tranmere finished 21st in League One, three points from safety and were relegated back to League Two. Newport's next season saw the club finish in 15th position in the League Two table, six places and eight points above the relegation zone but eight places and twelve points below the play-offs.
