= 2019–20 Newport County A.F.C. season =

Welsh association football club season

Newport County
2019–20 season
- Owner: Newport County AFC Supporters Trust
- Chairman: Gavin Foxall
- Manager: Michael Flynn
- Stadium: Rodney Parade
- League Two: 14th
- FA Cup: Third round
- EFL Cup: Second round
- EFL Trophy: Semi-final
- Top goalscorer: League: Pádraig Amond (8); All: Pádraig Amond (13)
- Highest home attendance: 6,382 v West Ham United (27 August 2019), EFL Cup round 2
- Lowest home attendance: 635 v Exeter City (8 October 2019), EFL Trophy Southern Group E
- Average home league attendance: 3,867
Home colours	Away colours	Third colours

The 2019–20 season was Newport County's seventh consecutive season in Football League Two, after missing out on promotion at the 2019 EFL League Two play-off final. It was Newport's 67th season in the Football League and 99th season of league football overall. The 2019–20 season was suspended on 13 March 2020 due to the COVID-19 pandemic with Newport 15th in League Two. The League Two season was formally terminated on 9 June 2020 with Newport having ten league matches unplayed. Points per game was subsequently adopted to determine the final League Two table with Newport County rising one place to 14th in the league.

== Transfers ==
=== Transfers in ===
Date from	Position	Nationality	Name	From	Fee	Ref.
1 July 2019	CB	(Nigeria)	Marvel Ekpiteta	(England) Hungerford Town	Free transfer	
1 July 2019	CB	(England)	Kyle Howkins	(England) West Bromwich Albion	Free transfer	
1 July 2019	GK	(Wales)	Tom King	(England) Millwall	Free transfer	
1 July 2019	RB	(England)	Daniel Leadbitter	(England) Bristol Rovers	Free transfer	
1 July 2019	CB	(Serbia)	Lazar Stojsavljevic	(England) Millwall	Free transfer	
1 July 2019	FW	(England)	Corey Whitely	(England) Ebbsfleet United	Free transfer	
12 July 2019	LB	(England)	Ryan Haynes	(England) Shrewsbury Town	Undisclosed	
25 July 2019	FW	(England)	Tristan Abrahams	(England) Norwich City	Free transfer	
2 September 2019	FW	(England)	Dominic Poleon	(England) Crawley Town	Free transfer	
13 January 2020	RB	(Wales)	Ash Baker	(England) Sheffield Wednesday	Undisclosed	

=== Loans in ===
Date from	Position	Nationality	Name	From	Date until	Ref.
12 July 2019	LB	(England)	George Nurse	(England) Bristol City	15 May 2020	
31 July 2019	RB	(Republic of Ireland)	Danny McNamara	(England) Millwall	6 January 2020	
1 August 2019	MF	(England)	Taylor Maloney	(England) Charlton Athletic	3 January 2020	
23 August 2019	CB	(England)	Ryan Inniss	(England) Crystal Palace	9 June 2020	
7 January 2020	SS	(England)	Billy Waters	(England) Northampton Town	9 June 2020	
9 January 2020	CM	(Northern Ireland)	Dale Gorman	(England) Leyton Orient	9 June 2020	
14 January 2020	RW	(England)	Jordan Green	(England) Barnsley	9 June 2020	
31 January 2020	LW	(England)	Otis Khan	(England) Mansfield Town	9 June 2020	

=== Loans out ===
Date from	Position	Nationality	Name	To	Date until	Ref.
11 July 2019	CB	(Wales)	Jay Foulston	(England) Chippenham Town	22 April 2020	
2 August 2019	CF	(Wales)	Momodou Touray	(England) Torquay United	2 September 2019	
2 September 2019	CF	(Wales)	Momodou Touray	(Wales) Barry Town United	22 April 2020	
12 October 2019	CB	(England)	Marvel Ekpiteta	(England) Ebbsfleet United	22 April 2020	
10 January 2020	SS	(England)	Corey Whitely	(England) Bromley	22 April 2020	
21 January 2020	MF	(Wales)	Dom Jefferies	(England) Salisbury	18 February 2020	
30 January 2020	CF	(England)	Dominic Poleon	(England) Dover Athletic	22 April 2020	
10 February 2020	CF	(England)	Ade Azeez	(England) Torquay United	22 April 2020	

=== Transfers out ===
Date from	Position	Nationality	Name	To	Fee	Ref.
12 August 2019	LB	(Wales)	Jay Williams	(England) Fulham	Undisclosed	
3 September 2019	CB	(Serbia)	Lazar Stojsavljevic	Free agent	Released	\
23 December 2019	RW	(Guyana)	Keanu Marsh-Brown	Free agent	Released	
15 June 2020	CB	(Republic of Ireland)	Mark O'Brien	Retired	N/A	
30 June 2020	FW	(Jamaica)	Jamille Matt	Free agent	Released	
30 June 2020	DF	(England)	Scot Bennett	Free agent	Released	
30 June 2020	FW	(England)	Dominic Poleon	Free agent	Released	
30 June 2020	MF	(Wales)	Dom Jefferies	Free agent	Released	
30 June 2020	FW	(Wales)	Momodou Touray	Free agent	Released	
30 June 2020	DF	(Wales)	Jay Foulston	Free agent	Released	
30 June 2020	MF	(Wales)	Elis Watts	Free agent	Released	
30 June 2020	DF	(Wales)	Ioan Evans	Free agent	Released	
30 June 2020	DF	(Wales)	Ryan George	Free agent	Released	
30 June 2020	DF	(Wales)	Callum Jones	Free agent	Released	

== Pre-season ==
On 24 June 2019, Newport announced their pre-season schedule. A XI friendly against Moreton Rangers was later confirmed. The Exiles also travelled to Spain for a week training camp where they faced Egyptian side Al Ahly.

11 July 2019 Friendly	Newport County	1–1	Al Ahly	San Pedro del Pinatar, Spain
18:30 CEST (UTC+2)	Amond 22'	Report	El Sheikh 53'	Stadium: Pinatar Arena

12 July 2019 Friendly	Moreton Rangers	0–1	Newport County	Moreton-in-Marsh
19:00 BST (UTC+1)			Hillier 85'	Stadium: London Road

16 July 2019 Friendly	Undy Athletic	2–4	Newport County	Undy
19:00 BST (UTC+1)	Mbangam-Pasi 70'; Jarman 88'	Report	Trialist4 56'; 58' (o.g.); Trialist3 65'; Trailist3 80'	Stadium: The Causeway

17 July 2019 Friendly	Shrewsbury Town	0–1	Newport County	Ludlow
19:00 BST (UTC+1)		Report	Matt 57'	Stadium: Ludlow Stadium

19 July 2019 Friendly	Bath City	1–1	Newport County	Bath
19:00 BST (UTC+1)	Stearn 73'	Report	Trialist 42'	Stadium: Twerton Park

22 July 2019 Friendly	Weston-super-Mare	1–8	Newport County	Weston-super-Mare
19:00 BST (UTC+1)	Hendy 78'	Report	Labadie 18'; Amond 37', 59'; Howkins 43'; Whitely 70'; Marsh-Brown 73'; Sheehan 75'; Touray 87'	Stadium: Optima Stadium

24 July 2019 Friendly	Newport County	1–6	Chelsea Under-23s	Newport
19:00 BST (UTC+1)	Touray 30' (pen.)	Report	Gallagher 34'; Maatsen 43'; Castillo 49'; Ugbo 65', 80'; Broja 78'	Stadium: Newport Stadium; Attendance: 693

27 July 2019 Friendly	Hungerford Town	0–3	Newport County	Hungerford
13:00 BST (UTC+1)		Report	Labadie 3'; Whitely 34'; Amond 60'	Stadium: Bulpit Lane

== Competitions ==
=== League Two ===
==== League table ====
Pos	Team	Pld	W	D	L	GF	GA	GD	Pts	PPG
10	Forest Green Rovers	36	13	10	13	43	40	+3	49	1.36
11	Salford City	37	13	11	13	49	46	+3	50	1.35
12	Walsall	36	13	8	15	40	49	−9	47	1.31
13	Crawley Town	37	11	15	11	51	47	+4	48	1.30
14	Newport County	36	12	10	14	32	39	−7	46	1.28
15	Grimsby Town	37	12	11	14	45	51	−6	47	1.27
16	Cambridge United	37	12	9	16	40	48	−8	45	1.22
17	Leyton Orient	36	10	12	14	47	55	−8	42	1.17
18	Carlisle United	37	10	12	15	39	56	−17	42	1.14

Source: EFL Official Website
Rules for classification: 1) Points per game; 2) Goal difference; 3) Number of goals scored; 4) Head-to-head results; 5) Wins; 6) Away goals; 7) Penalty points (sec 9.5); 8) 12-point sending off offences

==== Result summary ====
Overall								Home						Away					
Pld	W	D	L	GF	GA	GD	Pts	W	D	L	GF	GA	GD	W	D	L	GF	GA	GD
36	12	10	14	32	39	−7	46	9	7	3	19	12	+7	3	3	11	13	27	−14

Last updated: 10 March 2020.

==== Results by matchday ====
Matchday	1	2	3	4	5	6	7	8	9	10	11	12	13	14	15	16	17	18	19	20	21	22	23	24	25	26	27	28	29	30	31	32	33	34	35	36
Ground	H	A	H	A	H	A	H	A	A	H	A	H	H	H	A	H	H	A	H	A	A	H	H	A	H	A	H	A	H	H	A	H	A	A	H	A
Result	D	D	W	D	W	W	W	L	D	D	W	W	W	D	L	L	L	L	D	L	L	D	D	W	W	L	W	L	L	D	L	W	L	L	W	L
Position	11	16	9	12	5	2	2	4	5	7	6	3	3	5	7	7	11	12	12	13	14	13	14	11	11	11	11	12	13	13	16	15	16	16	15	15

Updated to match(es) played on 10 March 2020. Source: Statto.com
A = Away; H = Home; W = Win; D = Draw; L = Loss

==== Fixtures ====
On Thursday, 20 June 2019, the EFL League Two fixtures were announced.

3 August 2019 1	Newport County	2–2	Mansfield Town	Newport
15:00 BST (UTC+1)	Labadie 7'; Amond 34' (pen.)	Report	Pearce 47'; Rose 49'	Stadium: Rodney Parade; Attendance: 4,481; Referee: James Adcock

10 August 2019 2	Cambridge United	0–0	Newport County	Cambridge
15:00 BST (UTC+1)		Report		Stadium: Abbey Stadium; Attendance: 3,949; Referee: Marc Edwards

17 August 2019 3	Newport County	1–0	Plymouth Argyle	Newport
15:00 BST (UTC+1)	Howkins 81'	Report		Stadium: Rodney Parade; Attendance: 5,048; Referee: Peter Wright

20 August 2019 4	Walsall	0–0	Newport County	Walsall
19:45 BST (UTC+1)		Report		Stadium: Bescot Stadium; Attendance: 4,337; Referee: Darren Handley

24 August 2019 5	Newport County	1–0	Crewe Alexandra	Newport
15:00 BST (UTC+1)	Amond 90+3'	Report		Stadium: Rodney Parade; Attendance: 3,712; Referee: Leigh Doughty

31 August 2019 6	Forest Green Rovers	0–2	Newport County	Nailsworth
15:00 BST (UTC+1)		Report	Amond 4'; Haynes 90+2'	Stadium: The New Lawn; Attendance: 2,897; Referee: James Adcock

7 September 2019 7	Newport County	1–0	Port Vale	Newport
15:00 BST (UTC+1)	Matt 77'	Report		Stadium: Rodney Parade; Attendance: Christopher Pollard; Referee: 3,913

14 September 2019 8	Northampton Town	2–0	Newport County	Northampton
15:00 BST (UTC+1)	Williams 5'; Hoskins 72'	Report		Stadium: Sixfields Stadium; Attendance: 4,616; Referee: Alan Young

17 September 2019 9	Macclesfield Town	1–1	Newport County	Macclesfield
19:45 BST (UTC+1)	Osadebe 19'	Report	Amond 1'	Stadium: Moss Rose; Attendance: 1,435; Referee: Graham Salisbury

21 September 2019 10	Newport County	1–1	Exeter City	Newport
15:00 BST (UTC+1)	Abrahams 64' (pen.)	Report	Martin 15'	Stadium: Rodney Parade; Attendance: 4,762; Referee: Neil Hair

28 September 2019 11	Swindon Town	0–2	Newport County	Swindon
15:00 BST (UTC+1)		Report	O'Brien 38'; Matt 82'	Stadium: County Ground; Attendance: 7,843; Referee: David Rock

5 October 2019 12	Newport County	1–0	Carlisle United	Newport
15:00 BST (UTC+1)	Nurse 90+6'	Report		Stadium: Rodney Parade; Attendance: 3,681; Referee: Antony Coggins

19 October 2019 13	Newport County	2–1	Scunthorpe United	Newport
15:00 BST (UTC+1)	Amond 45+4'; Sheehan 56'	Report	O'Brien 49' (o.g.)	Stadium: Rodney Parade; Attendance: 3,936; Referee: Tom Nield

22 October 2019 14	Newport County	1–1	Crawley Town	Newport
19:45 BST (UTC+1)	Abrahams 74' (pen.)	Report	Nathaniel-George 35' (pen.)	Stadium: Rodney Parade; Attendance: 3,119; Referee: Darren Drysdale

26 October 2019 15	Colchester United	3–1	Newport County	Colchester
15:00 BST (UTC+1)	Jackson 33'; Stevenson 44'; Senior 75'	Report	Abrahams 5'	Stadium: Colchester Community Stadium; Attendance: 2,955; Referee: James Oldham

2 November 2019 16	Newport County	1–2	Salford City	Newport
15:00 UTC	Pond 45+1' (o.g.)	Report	Burgess 40'; Maynard 54'	Stadium: Rodney Parade; Attendance: 3,947; Referee: Will Finnie

23 November 2019 17	Newport County	0–1	Oldham Athletic	Newport
15:00 UTC		Report	Mills 45+1'	Stadium: Rodney Parade; Attendance: 3,748; Referee: Craig Hicks

7 December 2019 18	Bradford City	1–0	Newport County	Bradford
15:00 UTC	Vaughan 59' (pen.)	Report		Stadium: Valley Parade; Attendance: 14,016; Referee: Anthony Backhouse

14 December 2019 19	Newport County	1–1	Stevenage	Newport
15:00 UTC	Matt 90+2'	Report	Sonupe 12'	Stadium: Rodney Parade; Attendance: 3,556; Referee: Chris Sarginson

21 December 2019 20	Morecambe	2–1	Newport County	Morecambe
15:00 UTC	Stockton 68'; O'Sullivan 80'	Report	Labadie 14'	Stadium: Globe Arena; Attendance: 2,161; Referee: Paul Marsden

26 December 2019 21	Exeter City	1–0	Newport County	Exeter
15:00 UTC	Martin 14'	Report		Stadium: St James Park; Attendance: 5,968; Referee: Brett Huxtable

29 December 2019 22	Newport County	1–1	Leyton Orient	Newport
15:00 UTC	Amond 81'	Report	Sotiriou 2'	Stadium: Rodney Parade; Attendance: 4,447; Referee: Lee Swabey

1 January 2020 23	Newport County	1–1	Cheltenham Town	Newport
15:00 UTC	Abrahams 47'	Report	Tozer 86'	Stadium: Rodney Parade; Attendance: 3,913; Referee: Peter Wright

11 January 2020 24	Scunthorpe United	1–2	Newport County	Scunthorpe
15:00 UTC	Eisa 38'	Report	Matt 72'; Amond 76'	Stadium: Glanford Park; Attendance: 3,001; Referee: Scott Oldham

18 January 2020 25	Newport County	2–0	Swindon Town	Newport
15:00 UTC	Sheehan 1'; Matt 49'	Report		Stadium: Rodney Parade; Attendance: 4,981; Referee: Christopher Pollard

25 January 2020 26	Leyton Orient	2–1	Newport County	Leyton, London
15:00 UTC	Haynes 81' (o.g.); Sotiriou 89'	Report	Matt 90+5'	Stadium: Brisbane Road; Attendance: 5,084; Referee: David Rock

28 January 2020 27	Newport County	1–0	Macclesfield Town	Newport
19:45 UTC	Labadie 34'	Report		Stadium: Rodney Parade; Attendance: 3,354; Referee: Graham Salisbury

1 February 2020 28	Plymouth Argyle	1–0	Newport County	Plymouth
15:00 UTC	Bakinson 5'	Report		Stadium: Home Park; Attendance: 10,956; Referee: Ollie Yates

8 February 2020 29	Newport County	0–1	Cambridge United	Newport
15:00 UTC		Report	O'Neil 68'	Stadium: Rodney Parade; Attendance: 3,336; Referee: Lee Swabey

11 February 2020 30	Newport County	0–0	Walsall	Newport
19:45 UTC		Report		Stadium: Rodney Parade; Attendance: 3,049; Referee: Brett Huxtable

15 February 2020 31	Mansfield Town	1–0	Newport County	Mansfield
15:00 UTC	Rose 29'	Report		Stadium: Field Mill; Attendance: 3,653; Referee: Dean Whitestone

22 February 2020 32	Newport County	2–1	Bradford City	Newport
15:00 UTC	Inniss 28'; Bennett 33'	Report	Donaldson 26'	Stadium: Rodney Parade; Attendance: 3,439; Referee: Josh Smith

25 February 2020 33	Grimsby Town	4–2	Newport County	Cleethorpes
19:45 UTC	Garmston 1'; Hanson 61'; Benson 40'; Wright 84'	Report	Green 10'; Amond 68'	Stadium: Blundell Park; Attendance: 3,578; Referee: Sebastian Stockbridge

29 February 2020 34	Oldham Athletic	5–0	Newport County	Oldham
15:00 UTC	Rowe 25', 52'; Dearnley 27'; Hamer 62'; Smith 83'	Report		Stadium: Boundary Park; Attendance: 2,912; Referee: Thomas Bramall

7 March 2020 35	Newport County	1–0	Morecambe	Newport
15:00 UTC	Gorman 69'	Report		Stadium: Rodney Parade; Attendance: 3,048; Referee: Neil Hair

10 March 2020 36	Carlisle United	2–0	Newport County	Carlisle
19:45 UTC	Patrick 5'; Kayode 33' (pen.)	Report		Stadium: Brunton Park; Attendance: 2,822; Referee: Graham Salisbury

14 March 2020 37	Stevenage	v	Newport County	Stevenage
15:00 UTC				Stadium: Broadhall Way
Note: Season was suspended until at least 30 April 2020, due to the COVID-19 pandemic.

17 March 2020 38	Crawley Town	v	Newport County	Crawley
19:45 UTC				Stadium: Broadfield Stadium
Note: Season was suspended until at least 30 April 2020, due to the COVID-19 pandemic.

21 March 2020 39	Newport County	v	Colchester United	Newport
15:00 UTC				Stadium: Rodney Parade
Note: Season was suspended until at least 30 April 2020, due to the COVID-19 pandemic.

24 March 2020 40	Cheltenham Town	v	Newport County	Cheltenham
19:45 GMT				Stadium: Whaddon Road
Note: Season was suspended until at least 30 April 2020, due to the COVID-19 pandemic.

28 March 2020 41	Salford City	v	Newport County	Salford
15:00 UTC				Stadium: Moor Lane
Note: Season was suspended until at least 30 April 2020, due to the COVID-19 pandemic.

4 April 2020 42	Newport County	v	Grimsby Town	Newport
15:00 BST (UTC+1)				Stadium: Rodney Parade
Note: Season was suspended until at least 30 April 2020, due to the COVID-19 pandemic.

10 April 2020 43	Crewe Alexandra	v	Newport County	Crewe
15:00 BST (UTC+1)				Stadium: Gresty Road
Note: Season was suspended until at least 30 April 2020, due to the COVID-19 pandemic.

13 April 2020 44	Newport County	v	Forest Green Rovers	Newport
15:00 BST (UTC+1)				Stadium: Rodney Parade
Note: Season was suspended until at least 30 April 2020, due to the COVID-19 pandemic.

18 April 2020 45	Port Vale	v	Newport County	Stoke-on-Trent
15:00 BST (UTC+1)				Stadium: Vale Park
Note: Season was suspended until at least 30 April 2020, due to the COVID-19 pandemic.

25 April 2020 46	Newport County	v	Northampton Town	Newport
15:00 BST (UTC+1)				Stadium: Rodney Parade
Note: Season was suspended until at least 30 April 2020, due to the COVID-19 pandemic.

=== FA Cup ===
The first round draw was made on 21 October 2019. The second round draw was made live on 11 November from Chichester City's stadium, Oaklands Park. The third round draw was made live on BBC Two from Etihad Stadium, Micah Richards and Tony Adams conducted the draw.

9 November 2019 Round 1	Grimsby Town	1–1	Newport County	Grimsby
15:00 UTC	Waterfall 43'	Report	Amond 80' (pen.)	Stadium: Blundell Park; Attendance: 2,086; Referee: Leigh Doughty

20 November 2019 Round 1 replay	Newport County	2–0	Grimsby Town	Newport
19:45 UTC	Amond 50'; Labadie 90+2'	Report		Stadium: Rodney Parade; Attendance: 2,053; Referee: Darren Handley

29 November 2019 Round 2	Maldon & Tiptree	0–1	Newport County	Maldon
19:55 UTC		Report	Amond 90'	Stadium: Wallace Binder Ground; Referee: Seb Stockbridge

4 January 2020 Round 3	Millwall	3–0	Newport County	Bermondsey, London
12:01 UTC	Smith 7'; Mahoney 64' (pen.); Bradshaw 82'	Report		Stadium: The Den; Attendance: 6,009; Referee: Tony Harrington

=== EFL Cup ===
The first round draw was made on 20 June. The second round draw was made on 13 August 2019 following the conclusion of all but one first-round matches.

13 August 2019 Round 1	Gillingham	2–2 (1–4 p)	Newport County	Gillingham
19:45 BST (UTC+1)	Hanlan 26' (pen.); Ndjoli 90' (pen.)	Report	Abrahams 84'; Amond 90+4' (pen.)	Stadium: Priestfield Stadium; Referee: Trevor Kettle
	Penalties
	Jones (penalty missed); Mandron (penalty scored); Marshall (penalty missed)		(penalty scored) Sheehan; (penalty scored) Amond; (penalty scored) Demetriou; (penalty scored) Abrahams

27 August 2019 Round 2	Newport County	0–2	West Ham United	Newport
19:45 BST (UTC+1)		Report	Wilshere 43'; Fornals 65'	Stadium: Rodney Parade; Attendance: 6,382; Referee: Stephen Martin

=== EFL Trophy ===
On 9 July 2019, the pre-determined group stage draw was announced with Invited clubs to be drawn on 12 July 2019. The draw for the second round was made on 16 November 2019 live on Sky Sports. The third round draw was confirmed on 5 December 2019.

Pos	Div	Team	Pld	W	PW	PL	L	GF	GA	GD	Pts	Qualification
1	L2	Exeter City	3	3	0	0	0	6	1	+5	9	Advance to Round 2
2	L2	Newport County	3	1	0	0	2	11	11	0	3	Advance to Round 2
3	ACA	West Ham United U21	3	1	0	0	2	9	11	−2	3	
4	L2	Cheltenham Town	3	1	0	0	2	8	11	−3	3	

Source: EFL.com

4 September 2019 Southern Group E	Newport County	4–5	West Ham United U21	Newport
19:45 BST (UTC+1)	Abrahams 11'; Whitely 12'; Collins 33'; Hillier 42'	Report	Scully 2', 88'; Powell 47' (pen.); Parkes 53'; Corbett 83'	Stadium: Rodney Parade; Attendance: 581; Referee: John Busby

8 October 2019 Southern Group E	Newport County	0–2	Exeter City	Newport
19:45 BST (UTC+1)		Report	Jay 40', 72'	Stadium: Rodney Parade; Attendance: 635; Referee: Lee Swabey

12 November 2019 Southern Group E	Cheltenham Town	4–7	Newport County	Cheltenham
19:45 UTC	Sheaf 17'; Addai 34'; Long 37'; Tozer 84'	Report	Maloney 8', 45+2', 53'; Dolan 27' (pen.); Abrahams 30', 43', 68'	Stadium: Whaddon Road; Attendance: 774

3 December 2019 Round 2	Brighton & Hove Albion U21	0–0 (4–5 p)	Newport County	Brighton
19:00 UTC		Report		Stadium: Falmer Stadium; Referee: Sam Purkiss
	Penalties
	Davies (penalty scored); Cashman (penalty scored); Gwargis (penalty scored); Yapi (penalty scored); Tolaj (penalty missed)		Abrahams (penalty scored); Haynes (penalty scored); Matt (penalty scored); Maloney (penalty scored); Nurse (penalty scored)

7 January 2020 Round 3	Newport County	3–0	Milton Keynes Dons	Newport
19:30 UTC	Abrahams 4'; Amond 25'; Sorinola 35' (o.g.)	Report		Stadium: Rodney Parade; Attendance: 767; Referee: John Busby

4 February 2020 Quarter-final	Newport County	1–0	Leicester City U21	Newport
19:00 UTC	Bennett 13'	Report		Stadium: Rodney Parade; Attendance: 1,357; Referee: Ben Toner

19 February 2020 Semi-final	Newport County	0–0 (5–6 p)	Salford City	Newport
19:45 UTC		Report		Stadium: Rodney Parade; Attendance: 4,070; Referee: Anthony Backhouse
	Penalties
	Demetriou (penalty scored); Sheehan (penalty scored); Abrahams (penalty missed); Labadie (penalty scored); Dolan (penalty scored); Matt (penalty scored); Inniss (penalty missed)		Rooney (penalty scored); Touray (penalty scored); Jervis (penalty scored); Conway (penalty scored); Thomas-Asante (penalty missed); Gibson (penalty scored); Wilson (penalty scored)

== Squad statistics ==
As of 3 April 2020

No.	Pos	Nat	Player	Total		League Two		FA Cup		League Cup		League Trophy	
No.	Pos	Nat	Player	Apps	Goals	Apps	Goals	Apps	Goals	Apps	Goals	Apps	Goals
1	GK	(Wales) WAL	Tom King	35	0	31+0	0	2+0	0	0+0	0	2+0	0
2	DF	(England) ENG	Daniel Leadbitter	6	0	3+0	0	0+0	0	1+0	0	2+0	0
3	DF	(England) ENG	Ryan Haynes	40	1	32+0	1	4+0	0	1+0	0	2+1	0
4	MF	(England) ENG	Joss Labadie	32	4	24+3	3	3+0	1	0+0	0	1+1	0
5	DF	(England) ENG	Kyle Howkins	23	1	10+6	1	1+0	0	2+0	0	3+1	0
6	MF	(England) ENG	Dale Gorman	8	1	7+1	1	0+0	0	0+0	0	0+0	0
7	MF	(England) ENG	Robbie Willmott	31	0	25+1	0	2+0	0	1+0	0	2+0	0
8	MF	(England) ENG	Matt Dolan	34	1	13+9	0	1+2	0	2+0	0	7+0	1
9	FW	(Republic of Ireland) IRL	Pádraig Amond	41	13	25+7	8	3+1	3	1+1	1	2+1	1
10	MF	(Wales) WAL	Josh Sheehan	43	2	34+0	2	4+0	0	1+1	0	3+0	0
11	FW	(Jamaica) JAM	Jamille Matt	40	6	26+7	6	3+1	0	0+0	0	3+0	0
12	DF	(Wales) WAL	Ash Baker	4	0	4+0	0	0+0	0	0+0	0	0+0	0
15	FW	(England) ENG	Tristan Abrahams	46	10	17+16	4	4+0	0	2+0	1	5+2	5
16	MF	(England) ENG	George Nurse	27	1	9+9	1	2+1	0	1+0	0	3+2	0
17	DF	(England) ENG	Scot Bennett	37	2	25+3	1	3+0	0	1+1	0	3+1	1
21	FW	(Wales) WAL	Lewis Collins	13	1	0+6	0	0+1	0	0+1	0	3+2	1
22	FW	(England) ENG	Billy Waters	6	0	2+4	0	0+0	0	0+0	0	0+0	0
25	DF	(Republic of Ireland) IRL	Mark O'Brien	28	1	21+0	1	4+0	0	2+0	0	1+0	0
27	DF	(England) ENG	Ryan Inniss	29	1	21+1	1	3+0	0	0+0	0	3+1	0
28	DF	(England) ENG	Mickey Demetriou	25	0	21+0	0	1+0	0	0+1	0	2+0	0
29	MF	(Wales) WAL	Dom Jefferies	6	0	0+0	0	1+0	0	0+0	0	5+0	0
30	GK	(England) ENG	Nick Townsend	14	0	5+0	0	2+0	0	2+0	0	5+0	0
31	FW	(England) ENG	Otis Khan	5	0	4+1	0	0+0	0	0+0	0	0+0	0
33	FW	(England) ENG	Jordan Green	13	1	8+3	1	0+0	0	0+0	0	0+2	0
34	MF	(Wales) WAL	Ioan Evans (footballer)	3	0	0+0	0	0+0	0	0+0	0	0+3	0
38	MF	(Wales) WAL	Ryan George	1	0	0+0	0	0+0	0	0+0	0	0+1	0
39	FW	(Wales) WAL	Ryan Hillier	3	1	0+0	0	0+0	0	0+0	0	0+3	1
47	DF	(England) ENG	Joe Woodiwiss	2	0	0+0	0	0+0	0	0+0	0	2+0	0
Players currently out on loan:
20	FW	(England) ENG	Corey Whitely	19	1	3+7	0	1+2	0	2+0	0	4+0	1
24	FW	(England) ENG	Dominic Poleon	12	0	0+5	0	0+3	0	0+0	0	3+1	0
26	DF	(England) ENG	Marvel Ekpiteta	2	0	0+0	0	0+0	0	0+0	0	2+0	0
37	MF	(Wales) WAL	Elis Watts	2	0	0+0	0	0+0	0	0+0	0	2+0	0
40	DF	(Wales) WAL	Callum Jones	1	0	0+0	0	0+0	0	0+0	0	0+1	0
Players who left the club:
6	DF	(Serbia) SRB	Lazar Stojsavljevic	1	0	0+0	0	0+0	0	1+0	0	0+0	0
12	DF	(Republic of Ireland) IRL	Danny McNamara	23	0	20+1	0	0+0	0	1+0	0	1+0	0
22	MF	(England) ENG	Taylor Maloney	16	3	5+5	0	0+0	0	1+1	0	4+0	3

=== Goals record ===
As of 3 April 2020

Rank	No.	Nat.	Po.	Name	League Two	FA Cup	League Cup	League Trophy	Total
1	9	(Republic of Ireland)	CF	Pádraig Amond	8	3	1	1	13
2	15	(England)	CF	Tristan Abrahams	4	0	1	5	10
3	11	(Jamaica)	CF	Jamille Matt	6	0	0	0	6
4	4	(England)	CM	Joss Labadie	3	1	0	0	4
5	~~22~~	(England)	DM	Taylor Maloney	0	0	0	3	3
6	10	(Wales)	CM	Josh Sheehan	2	0	0	0	2
6	17	(England)	CB	Scot Bennett	1	0	0	1	2
8	3	(England)	LB	Ryan Haynes	1	0	0	0	1
8	5	(England)	CB	Kyle Howkins	1	0	0	0	1
8	6	(England)	CM	Dale Gorman	1	0	0	0	1
8	8	(England)	CM	Matt Dolan	0	0	0	1	1
8	16	(England)	CM	George Nurse	1	0	0	0	1
8	20	(England)	SS	Corey Whitely	0	0	0	1	1
8	21	(Wales)	CF	Lewis Collins	0	0	0	1	1
8	25	(Republic of Ireland)	CB	Mark O'Brien	1	0	0	0	1
8	27	(England)	CB	Ryan Inniss	1	0	0	0	1
8	33	(England)	RW	Jordan Green	1	0	0	0	1
8	39	(Wales)	CF	Ryan Hillier	0	0	0	1	1
Own Goals					1	0	0	1	1
Total					32	4	2	15	53

=== Disciplinary record ===
As of 3 April 2020

Rank	No.	Nat.	Po.	Name	League Two			FA Cup			League Cup			League Trophy			Total		
Rank	No.	Nat.	Po.	Name	Booked	(yellow card) (yellow-red card)	Sent off (straight red)	Booked	(yellow card) (yellow-red card)	Sent off (straight red)	Booked	(yellow card) (yellow-red card)	Sent off (straight red)	Booked	(yellow card) (yellow-red card)	Sent off (straight red)	Booked	(yellow card) (yellow-red card)	Sent off (straight red)
1	4	(England)	CM	Joss Labadie	10	0	0	1	0	0	0	0	0	0	0	0	11	0	0
2	27	(England)	CB	Ryan Inniss	7	0	1	0	0	0	0	0	0	0	0	1	7	0	2
3	10	(Wales)	CM	Josh Sheehan	6	0	0	1	0	0	0	0	0	1	0	0	8	0	0
3	11	(Jamaica)	CF	Jamille Matt	4	1	0	1	0	0	0	0	0	1	0	0	6	1	0
5	15	(England)	CF	Tristan Abrahams	5	0	0	2	0	0	0	0	0	0	0	0	7	0	0
6	~~12~~	(Republic of Ireland)	RB	Danny McNamara	6	0	0	0	0	0	0	0	0	0	0	0	6	0	0
7	3	(England)	LB	Ryan Haynes	5	0	0	0	0	0	0	0	0	0	0	0	5	0	0
8	8	(England)	CM	Matt Dolan	3	0	0	0	0	0	0	0	0	1	0	0	4	0	0
8	17	(England)	CB	Scot Bennett	2	0	0	1	0	0	0	0	0	1	0	0	4	0	0
10	5	(England)	CB	Kyle Howkins	2	0	0	0	0	0	1	0	0	0	0	0	3	0	0
10	7	(England)	RM	Robbie Willmott	2	0	0	0	0	0	0	0	0	1	0	0	3	0	0
10	16	(England)	CM	George Nurse	1	0	0	1	0	0	0	0	0	1	0	0	3	0	0
10	25	(Republic of Ireland)	CB	Mark O'Brien	3	0	0	0	0	0	0	0	0	0	0	0	3	0	0
10	28	(England)	CB	Mickey Demetriou	2	0	0	0	0	0	0	0	0	1	0	0	3	0	0
15	1	(Wales)	GK	Tom King	2	0	0	0	0	0	0	0	0	0	0	0	2	0	0
15	6	(England)	CM	Dale Gorman	2	0	0	0	0	0	0	0	0	0	0	0	2	0	0
15	9	(Republic of Ireland)	CF	Pádraig Amond	2	0	0	0	0	0	0	0	0	0	0	0	2	0	0
18	12	(Wales)	RB	Ash Baker	1	0	0	0	0	0	0	0	0	0	0	0	1	0	0
18	29	(Wales)	CM	Dom Jefferies	0	0	0	0	0	0	0	0	0	1	0	0	1	0	0
18	30	(England)	GK	Nick Townsend	1	0	0	0	0	0	0	0	0	0	0	0	1	0	0
18	33	(England)	RW	Jordan Green	1	0	0	0	0	0	0	0	0	0	0	0	1	0	0
Total					65	1	1	7	0	0	1	0	0	9	0	1	82	1	2
