= 2019–20 EFL Trophy =

Leasing.com Trophy

Tournament details
- Country: England; Wales
- Teams: Originally 64 (63 after walkover)

Final positions
- Champions: Salford City (1st title)
- Runners-up: Portsmouth

Tournament statistics
- Matches played: 124
- Goals scored: 376 (3.03 per match)
- Attendance: 200,857 (1,620 per match)
- Top goal scorer(s): (England) Tristan Abrahams Newport County (Netherlands) Kevin van Veen Scunthorpe United (5 goals each)

The 2019–20 EFL Trophy, known as the Leasing.com Trophy (Note: It was known as the Papa John's Trophy for the Final due to the sponsorship changing for the 2020–21 season, with the 2020 Final having been delayed by a year. Leasing.com no longer sponsor the competition in 2021.) for sponsorship reasons, was the 39th season in the history of the competition, a knock-out tournament for English football clubs in League One and League Two of the English football system, and also including 16 Premier League and Championship "Academy teams" with Category One status. Due to their financial crisis, Bury were expelled from the EFL and automatically eliminated from the competition as well.

Portsmouth were the defending champions, and reached the final once again. They were beaten on penalties by Salford City after a 0–0 draw. The final was held on March 13, 2021, having been delayed 11 months as the originally scheduled date of April 5, 2020 was just after suspension of English football due to the COVID-19 pandemic.

== Participating clubs ==
- 48 clubs from League One and League Two.
- 16 invited Category One Academy teams.
- Expelled clubs were automatically eliminated from the tournament.
- Category One teams relegated to League One missed out on having academies participate in the following tournament.

	League One	League Two	Academies
Clubs	Accrington Stanley; AFC Wimbledon; Blackpool; Bolton Wanderers; Bristol Rovers; Burton Albion; ~~Bury~~; Coventry City; Doncaster Rovers; Fleetwood Town; Gillingham; Ipswich Town; Lincoln City; Milton Keynes Dons; Oxford United; Peterborough United; Portsmouth; Rochdale; Rotherham United; Shrewsbury Town; Southend United; Sunderland; Tranmere Rovers; Wycombe Wanderers	Bradford City; Cambridge United; Carlisle United; Cheltenham Town; Colchester United; Crawley Town; Crewe Alexandra; Exeter City; Forest Green Rovers; Grimsby Town; Leyton Orient; Macclesfield Town; Mansfield Town; Morecambe; Newport County; Northampton Town; Oldham Athletic; Plymouth Argyle; Port Vale; Salford City; Scunthorpe United; Stevenage; Swindon Town; Walsall	Arsenal; Aston Villa; Brighton & Hove Albion; Chelsea; Everton; Fulham; Leicester City; Liverpool; Manchester City; Manchester United; Newcastle United; Norwich City; Southampton; Tottenham Hotspur; West Ham United; Wolverhampton Wanderers
Total	23	24	16

== Eligibility criteria for players ==
For EFL clubs

- Minimum of four qualifying outfield players in their starting XI. A qualifying outfield player will be one who meets any of the following requirements:
  - Any player who started the previous or following first-team fixture.
  - Any player who is in the top 10 players at the club, who have made the most starting appearances in league and domestic cup competitions that season.
  - Any player with 40 or more first-team appearances in their career.
  - Any player on loan from a Premier League club or any EFL Category One Academy club.
- A club can play any eligible goalkeeper in the competition

For invited teams

- Minimum of six players in the starting line-up who played at under-21 level, as at 30 June 2019.
- Teams may only include two players on the team sheet who are over the age of 21 and have made forty or more senior appearances, as at 30 June 2019.
  - A senior appearance will be defined as having played in a professional first-team fixture. A non-playing substitute does not count.

== Competition format ==
Group stage

- Sixteen groups of 4 teams would be organised on a regionalised basis.
- All groups would include one invited club.
- All clubs would play each other once, either home or away (Academies play all group matches away from home).
- Clubs would be awarded three points for a win and one point for a draw.
- In the event of a drawn game (after 90 minutes), a penalty shootout would be held with the winning team earning an additional point.
- Clubs expelled from the EFL will be knocked out of the tournament automatically.
- The top two teams would progress to the Knockout Stage.

Knockout stage

- Round 2 and 3 of the competition will be drawn on a regionalised basis.
- In Round 2, the group winners shall be seeded and the group runners-up shall be unseeded in the draw.
- In Round 2, teams who played in the same group as each other in the Group Stage shall keep apart from each other.

== Group stage ==
=== Northern Section ===
==== Group A ====
Pos	Div	Team	Pld	W	PW	PL	L	GF	GA	GD	Pts	Qualification
1	ACA	Leicester City U21	3	2	1	0	0	5	3	+2	8	Advance to Round 2
2	L2	Scunthorpe United	3	2	0	1	0	6	2	+4	7	Advance to Round 2
3	L1	Sunderland	3	1	0	0	2	4	7	−3	3	
4	L2	Grimsby Town	3	0	0	0	3	4	7	−3	0	

Source: EFL.com

3 September 2019	Grimsby Town	1–2	Scunthorpe United	Cleethorpes
19:45 BST	Cardwell 49'	Report	van Veen 28', 75'	Stadium: Blundell Park; Attendance: 1,302

24 September 2019	Scunthorpe United	1–1 (1–3 p)	Leicester City U21	Scunthorpe
19:45 BST	Colclough 88'	Report	Dewsbury-Hall 87'	Stadium: Glanford Park; Attendance: 572
	Penalties
	Colclough (penalty missed); Miller (penalty missed); Dales (penalty scored); Sutton (penalty missed)		Dewsbury-Hall (penalty scored); Muskwe (penalty missed); Felix-Eppiah (penalty scored); Thomas (penalty scored)

8 October 2019	Sunderland	3–2	Grimsby Town	Sunderland
19:45 BST	Watmore 68'; McNulty 79'; Grigg 86'	Report	Green 59'; Whitehouse 81'	Stadium: Stadium of Light; Attendance: 6,952

29 October 2019	Grimsby Town	1–2	Leicester City U21	Cleethorpes
19:45 GMT	Ogbu 31'	Report	Felix-Eppiah 68', 90'	Stadium: Blundell Park; Attendance: 341

5 November 2019	Sunderland	1–2	Leicester City U21	Sunderland
19:45 GMT	Maguire 14'	Report	Hirst 50' (pen.); Dewsbury-Hall 53'	Stadium: Stadium of Light; Attendance: 7,649

12 November 2019	Scunthorpe United	3–0	Sunderland	Scunthorpe
19:45 GMT	Novak 66' (pen.), 90+1'; Eisa 88'	Report	O'Nien (red card) 65'	Stadium: Glanford Park; Attendance: 1,002

==== Group B ====
Pos	Div	Team	Pld	W	PW	PL	L	GF	GA	GD	Pts	Qualification
1	L1	Accrington Stanley	3	3	0	0	0	10	3	+7	9	Advance to Round 2
2	L1	Fleetwood Town	3	1	1	0	1	7	5	+2	5	Advance to Round 2
3	L2	Oldham Athletic	3	1	0	0	2	5	10	−5	3	
4	ACA	Liverpool U21	3	0	0	1	2	5	9	−4	1	

Source: EFL.com

7 August 2019	Oldham Athletic	3–2	Liverpool U21	Oldham
19:00 BST	Segbé Azankpo 20'; Iacovitti 29'; Stott 81'	Report	Williams 4'; Elliott 44'	Stadium: Boundary Park; Attendance: 1,522; Referee: Paul Marsden

3 September 2019	Accrington Stanley	2–1	Fleetwood Town	Accrington
19:45 BST	Carvalho 53'; McConville 72'	Report	Madden 90+4' (pen.)	Stadium: Crown Ground; Attendance: 923

25 September 2019	Fleetwood Town	1–1 (4–3 p)	Liverpool U21	Fleetwood
19:45 BST	Clarke 76'	Report	Williams 78'	Stadium: Highbury Stadium; Attendance: 866
	Penalties
	Clarke (penalty scored); Garner (penalty scored); Morris (penalty scored); Mooney (penalty missed); Baggley (penalty scored)		Williams (penalty scored); Stewart (penalty scored); Cain (penalty missed); Dixon-Bonner (penalty scored); Clayton (penalty missed)

8 October 2019	Oldham Athletic	0–3	Accrington Stanley	Oldham
19:45 BST	Fage (red card) 45+2'	Report	Diallo 30'; Zanzala 42' (pen.); Clark 86'	Stadium: Boundary Park; Referee: 1,107

29 October 2019	Accrington Stanley	5–2	Liverpool U21	Accrington
19:45 GMT	Sykes 30'; Baker-Richardson 45+1'; Charles 52'; Clark 62'; Simpson 74'	Report	Dixon-Bonner 8'; Stewart 77'	Stadium: Crown Ground; Attendance: 1,002

13 November 2019	Fleetwood Town	5–2	Oldham Athletic	Fleetwood
19:45 GMT	Clarke 9'; Morris 11'; Sowerby 14'; Burns 40'; Madden 51'	Report	Smith 25'; Segbé Azankpo 78'	Stadium: Highbury Stadium; Attendance: 535

==== Group C ====
Pos	Div	Team	Pld	W	PW	PL	L	GF	GA	GD	Pts	Qualification
1	L2	Salford City	2	2	0	0	0	4	0	+4	6	Advance to Round 2
2	L1	Tranmere Rovers	2	1	0	0	1	2	3	−1	3	Advance to Round 2
3	ACA	Aston Villa U21	2	0	0	0	2	1	4	−3	0	
4	L1	Bury (Note: This group originally included the expelled Bury.) (E)	0	0	0	0	0	0	0	0	0	Expelled

Source: EFL.com
(E) Eliminated
Notes:

3 September 2019	Salford City	2–0	Aston Villa U21	Salford
19:45 BST	Lloyd 80' (pen.); Rooney 82'	Report		Stadium: Moor Lane; Attendance: 916

8 October 2019	Tranmere Rovers	2–1	Aston Villa U21	Birkenhead
19:45 BST	Ray 14'; Jennings 78'	Report	Archer 2'	Stadium: Prenton Park; Attendance: 978; Referee: Ollie Yates

12 November 2019	Tranmere Rovers	0–2	Salford City	Birkenhead
19:45 GMT		Report	Threlkeld 2'; Hogan 56'	Stadium: Prenton Park; Attendance: 1,196; Referee: James Adcock

==== Group D ====
Pos	Div	Team	Pld	W	PW	PL	L	GF	GA	GD	Pts	Qualification
1	L2	Port Vale	3	3	0	0	0	7	4	+3	9	Advance to Round 2
2	L1	Shrewsbury Town	3	2	0	0	1	7	3	+4	6	Advance to Round 2
3	L2	Macclesfield Town	3	1	0	0	2	5	7	−2	3	
4	ACA	Newcastle United U21	3	0	0	0	3	2	7	−5	0	

Source: EFL.com

3 September 2019	Macclesfield Town	2–1	Newcastle United U21	Macclesfield
19:45 BST	Fitzpatrick 19'; Gomis 65'	Report	Charman 48'	Stadium: Moss Rose; Attendance: 525

3 September 2019	Port Vale	2–1	Shrewsbury Town	Stoke-on-Trent
19:45 BST	Amoo 63' (pen.); Archer 75'	Report	Kennedy 27' (o.g.)	Stadium: Vale Park; Attendance: 1,008; Referee: Leigh Doughty

24 September 2019	Macclesfield Town	2–3	Port Vale	Macclesfield
19:45 BST	Ironside 16'; Archibald 90+2'	Report	Burgess 34'; Bennett 52'; Taylor 74'	Stadium: Moss Rose; Attendance: 757

8 October 2019	Shrewsbury Town	3–0	Newcastle United U21	Shrewsbury
19:30 BST	Okenabirhie 22'; Cummings 33'; Edwards 87'	Report		Stadium: New Meadow; Attendance: 1,408

12 November 2019	Port Vale	2–1	Newcastle United U21	Stoke-on-Trent
19:45 GMT	Cullen 40', 85'	Report	Anderson 50'	Stadium: Vale Park; Attendance: 571

13 November 2019	Shrewsbury Town	3–1	Macclesfield Town	Shrewsbury
19:30 GMT	Thompson 28'; Love (yellow card) 67' (yellow-red card) 76'; Edwards 74'; Walker 83'	Report	Archibald 59'	Stadium: New Meadow; Attendance: 1,065; Referee: Peter Wright

==== Group E ====
Pos	Div	Team	Pld	W	PW	PL	L	GF	GA	GD	Pts	Qualification
1	ACA	Everton U21	3	1	1	1	0	5	3	+2	6	Advance to Round 2
2	L2	Mansfield Town	3	1	0	2	0	4	3	+1	5	Advance to Round 2
3	L2	Crewe Alexandra	3	0	2	0	1	4	6	−2	4	
4	L1	Burton Albion	3	1	0	0	2	4	5	−1	3	

Source: EFL.com

27 August 2019	Mansfield Town	1–1 (1–4 p)	Everton U21	Mansfield
19:45 BST	Sterling-James 87'	Report	Gordon 28'	Stadium: Field Mill; Attendance: 824; Referee: Ben Toner
	Penalties
	Hamilton (penalty scored); Khan (penalty missed); Sterling-James (penalty missed)		Evans (penalty scored); Foulds (penalty scored); Charsley (penalty scored); Markelo (penalty scored)

3 September 2019	Crewe Alexandra	1–3	Burton Albion	Crewe
19:30 BST	Green 87'	Report	Quinn 13'; Fraser 23'; Akins 45+1'	Stadium: Gresty Road; Attendance: 917

1 October 2019	Burton Albion	0–2	Everton U21	Burton upon Trent
19:45 BST		Report	Simms 6'; Evans 49'	Stadium: Pirelli Stadium; Attendance: 435

8 October 2019	Mansfield Town	1–1 (3–4 p)	Crewe Alexandra	Mansfield
19:45 BST	Knowles 18'	Report	Finney 45'	Stadium: Field Mill; Attendance: 800
	Penalties
	Hamilton (penalty scored); Cook (penalty missed); Afolayan (penalty scored); Smith (penalty missed); Benning (penalty scored)		Ng (penalty missed); Jones (penalty scored); Pickering (penalty scored); Finney (penalty scored); Kirk (penalty scored)

5 November 2019	Crewe Alexandra	2–2 (5–4 p)	Everton U21	Crewe
19:45 GMT	Ainley 43'; Dale 78'	Report	Niasse 3', 75'	Stadium: Gresty Road; Attendance: 851
	Penalties
	Jones (penalty scored); Ainley (penalty scored); Pickering (penalty scored); Finney (penalty scored); Ng (penalty scored)		Foulds (penalty scored); Anderson (penalty scored); Astley (penalty missed); Niasse (penalty scored); Markelo (penalty scored)

12 November 2019	Burton Albion	1–2	Mansfield Town	Burton upon Trent
19:45 GMT	Templeton 35'	Report	Rose 23'; Sweeney 34'	Stadium: Pirelli Stadium; Attendance: 485; Referee: Lee Doughty

==== Group F ====
Pos	Div	Team	Pld	W	PW	PL	L	GF	GA	GD	Pts	Qualification
1	ACA	Manchester City U21	3	2	0	0	1	5	4	+1	6	Advance to Round 2
2	L1	Bolton Wanderers	3	1	0	2	0	5	3	+2	5	Advance to Round 2
3	L1	Rochdale	3	1	1	0	1	3	4	−1	5	
4	L2	Bradford City	3	0	1	0	2	3	5	−2	2	

Source: EFL.com

3 September 2019	Bolton Wanderers	1–1 (3–4 p)	Bradford City	Bolton
19:10 BST	Politic 8'	Report	O'Connor 51'	Stadium: University of Bolton Stadium; Attendance: 9,062
	Penalties
	Weir (penalty scored); Brockbank (penalty scored); Darcy (penalty scored); Boon (penalty missed); Senior (penalty missed)		Ismail (penalty scored); Gibson (penalty scored); Richards-Everton (penalty scored); Wood (penalty scored); O'Connor (penalty missed)

11 September 2019	Rochdale	0–2	Manchester City U21	Rochdale
19:45 BST		Report	Braaf 33'; Bernabé 61'	Stadium: Spotland Stadium; Attendance: 1,172

24 September 2019	Bradford City	1–2	Manchester City U21	Bradford
19:30 BST	Akpan 21'	Report	Rogers 27'; Doyle 63'	Stadium: Valley Parade; Attendance: 868

1 October 2019	Rochdale	1–1 (5–3 p)	Bolton Wanderers	Rochdale
19:45 BST	Wilbraham 57'	Report	Crawford 45+2'	Stadium: Spotland Stadium; Attendance: 1,412
	Penalties
	Andrew (penalty scored); Gillam (penalty scored); Morley (penalty scored); Norrington-Davies (penalty scored); Keohane (penalty scored)		Crawford (penalty scored); Politic (penalty scored); Verlinden (penalty scored); Chicksen (penalty missed)

29 October 2019	Bolton Wanderers	3–1	Manchester City U21	Bolton
19:00 GMT	Crawford 4'; O'Grady 66', 89'	Report	Zouma 13' (o.g.)	Stadium: University of Bolton Stadium; Attendance: 2,616

12 November 2019	Bradford City	1–2	Rochdale	Bradford
19:45 GMT	French 15'	Report	Pyke 29'; Tavares 35'	Stadium: Valley Parade; Attendance: 761; Referee: Darren Drysdale

==== Group G ====
Pos	Div	Team	Pld	W	PW	PL	L	GF	GA	GD	Pts	Qualification
1	L1	Blackpool	3	2	0	0	1	7	3	+4	6	Advance to Round 2
2	ACA	Wolverhampton Wanderers U21	3	1	1	0	1	6	5	+1	5	Advance to Round 2
3	L2	Morecambe	3	1	0	1	1	6	8	−2	4	
4	L2	Carlisle United	3	1	0	0	2	5	8	−3	3	

Source: EFL.com

3 September 2019	Blackpool	5–1	Morecambe	Blackpool
19:45 BST	Heneghan 4'; Nottingham 45+1'; Hardie 51'; Kaikai 89'; Nuttall 90+1'	Report	Ellison 22'	Stadium: Bloomfield Road; Attendance: 2,219; Referee: Marc Edwards

24 September 2019	Carlisle United	2–4	Wolverhampton Wanderers U21	Carlisle
19:45 BST	Hope 35'; Loft 45'	Report	Ashley-Seal 19', 47' (pen.), 64'; Dai 39'	Stadium: Brunton Park; Attendance: 893; Referee: Seb Stockbridge

1 October 2019	Morecambe	2–2 (4–5 p)	Wolverhampton Wanderers U21	Morecambe
19:45 BST	Brewitt 25'; Howard 81'	Report	Watt 23'; Samuels 29'	Stadium: Globe Arena; Attendance: 514
	Penalties
	Cranston (penalty scored); Buxton (penalty scored); O'Sullivan (penalty scored); Old (penalty scored); Howard (penalty missed); Mendes Gomes (penalty missed)		Watt (penalty missed); Perry (penalty scored); Sanderson (penalty scored); Dai (penalty scored); Ashley-Seal (penalty scored); Samuels (penalty scored)

15 October 2019	Carlisle United	2–1	Blackpool	Carlisle
19:45 BST	Loft 45+2'; Carroll 87'	Report	Gray 25' (o.g.)	Stadium: Brunton Park; Attendance: 911

5 November 2019	Blackpool	1–0	Wolverhampton Wanderers U21	Blackpool
19:45 GMT	Bushiri 90+3'	Report		Stadium: Bloomfield Road; Attendance: 1,036

12 November 2019	Morecambe	3–1	Carlisle United	Morecambe
19:45 GMT	Tutte 61' (pen.); Wildig 67'; Conlan 90+1'	Report	Branthwaite 25'	Stadium: Globe Arena; Attendance: 802; Referee: Graham Salisbury

==== Group H ====
Pos	Div	Team	Pld	W	PW	PL	L	GF	GA	GD	Pts	Qualification
1	ACA	Manchester United U21	3	3	0	0	0	5	1	+4	9	Advance to Round 2
2	L1	Doncaster Rovers	3	1	0	0	2	6	6	0	3	Advance to Round 2
3	L1	Lincoln City	3	1	0	0	2	4	4	0	3	
4	L1	Rotherham United	3	1	0	0	2	3	7	−4	3	

Source: EFL.com

6 August 2019	Rotherham United	0–2	Manchester United U21	Rotherham
19:45 BST		Report	Laird 69'; Ramazani 73'	Stadium: New York Stadium; Attendance: 3,105; Referee: Graham Salisbury

3 September 2019	Doncaster Rovers	3–1	Lincoln City	Doncaster
19:45 BST	John 55'; Sterling 69'; May 80'	Report	Akinde 43'	Stadium: Keepmoat Stadium; Attendance: 2,170; Referee: Scott Oldham

1 October 2019	Lincoln City	0–1	Manchester United U21	Lincoln
19:45 BST		Report	Garner 20'	Stadium: Sincil Bank; Attendance: 3,532; Referee: Rob Lewis

8 October 2019	Rotherham United	3–2	Doncaster Rovers	Rotherham
19:30 BST	Wright 11' (o.g.); Morris 67'; Clarke 77'	Report	Sadlier 37'; Wright 54'	Stadium: New York Stadium; Attendance: 2,192; Referee: Marc Edwards

29 October 2019	Doncaster Rovers	1–2	Manchester United U21	Doncaster
19:45 GMT	May 61'	Report	Galbraith 71'; Greenwood 90+4'	Stadium: Keepmoat Stadium; Attendance: 3,845; Referee: Alan Young

12 November 2019	Lincoln City	3–0	Rotherham United	Lincoln
19:45 GMT	Akinde 12' (pen.), 14'; Walker 87'	Report		Stadium: Sincil Bank; Attendance: 1,860

=== Southern Section ===
==== Group A ====
Pos	Div	Team	Pld	W	PW	PL	L	GF	GA	GD	Pts	Qualification
1	L2	Colchester United	3	2	0	1	0	5	3	+2	7	Advance to Round 2
2	L1	Ipswich Town	3	2	0	0	1	6	2	+4	6	Advance to Round 2
3	L1	Gillingham	3	1	0	0	2	4	7	−3	3	
4	ACA	Tottenham Hotspur U21	3	0	1	0	2	2	5	−3	2	

Source: EFL.com

3 September 2019	Gillingham	2–3	Colchester United	Gillingham
19:45 BST	O'Keefe 23'; Mandron 78'	Report	Cowan-Hall 8', 63'; Robinson 55'	Stadium: Priestfield Stadium; Attendance: 1,055

3 September 2019	Ipswich Town	2–1	Tottenham Hotspur U21	Ipswich
19:45 BST	Roberts 47', 66'	Report	Shashoua 8'	Stadium: Portman Road; Attendance: 5,377

8 October 2019	Colchester United	1–1 (5–6 p)	Tottenham Hotspur U21	Colchester
19:45 BST	Norris 44'	Report	Oakley-Boothe 75'	Stadium: Colchester Community Stadium; Attendance: 1,061
	Penalties
	Norris (penalty missed); Brown (penalty scored); Robinson (penalty scored); Senior (penalty scored); Chilvers (penalty missed); Eastman (penalty scored); Jackson (penalty scored); Comley (penalty missed)		Binks (penalty scored); White (penalty missed); Shashoua (penalty scored); Patterson (penalty missed); Eyoma (penalty scored); Etete (penalty scored); Hinds (penalty scored); Walcott (penalty scored)

8 October 2019	Ipswich Town	4–0	Gillingham	Ipswich
19:30 BST	Huws 8'; Roberts 21'; Mandron 61' (o.g.); Keane 87'	Report		Stadium: Portman Road; Attendance: 5,271

12 November 2019	Colchester United	1–0	Ipswich Town	Colchester
19:30 GMT	Clampin 80'	Report		Stadium: Colchester Community Stadium; Attendance: 5,104

12 November 2019	Gillingham	2–0	Tottenham Hotspur U21	Gillingham
19:45 GMT	Jakubiak 25'; Tucker 79'	Report		Stadium: Priestfield Stadium; Attendance: 1,196

==== Group B ====
Pos	Div	Team	Pld	W	PW	PL	L	GF	GA	GD	Pts	Qualification
1	L1	Portsmouth	3	2	1	0	0	6	3	+3	8	Advance to Round 2
2	L1	Oxford United	3	2	0	1	0	8	4	+4	7	Advance to Round 2
3	ACA	Norwich City U21	3	1	0	0	2	4	6	−2	3	
4	L2	Crawley Town	3	0	0	0	3	2	7	−5	0	

Source: EFL.com

3 September 2019	Oxford United	2–1	Norwich City U21	Oxford
19:45 BST	Brannagan 77'; Baptiste 85'	Report	Hutchinson 64'	Stadium: Kassam Stadium; Attendance: 1,084

3 September 2019	Portsmouth	1–0	Crawley Town	Portsmouth
19:45 BST	Pitman 70'	Report		Stadium: Fratton Park; Attendance: 3,784

14 September 2019	Portsmouth	3–1	Norwich City U21	Portsmouth
12:30 BST	Harrison 10', 60'; Flint 44'	Report	Scully 67'	Stadium: Fratton Park; Attendance: 2,855

1 October 2019	Crawley Town	1–2	Norwich City U21	Crawley
19:45 BST	Nathaniel-George 63'	Report	Ahadme 19'; Lomas 74'	Stadium: Broadfield Stadium; Attendance: 361

8 October 2019	Oxford United	2–2 (4–5 p)	Portsmouth	Oxford
19:30 BST	Taylor 21'; Dickie 90+1'		Lethbridge 33'; Walkes 85'	Stadium: Kassam Stadium; Attendance: 1,548
	Penalties
	Sole (penalty scored); Brannagan (penalty scored); Hall (penalty scored); Sykes (penalty scored); Ruffels (penalty missed); Agyei (penalty missed); Long (penalty missed)		Evans (penalty scored); Harrison (penalty scored); Close (penalty missed); Williams (penalty scored); Downing (penalty scored); Walkes (penalty missed); Haunstrup (penalty scored)

12 November 2019	Crawley Town	1–4	Oxford United	Crawley
19:45 GMT	Bloomfield 50'; Francomb (red card) 56'	Report	Hall 12', 57' (pen.), 73' (pen.); Forde 28' (pen.)	Stadium: Broadfield Stadium; Attendance: 412; Referee: Josh Smith

==== Group C ====
Pos	Div	Team	Pld	W	PW	PL	L	GF	GA	GD	Pts	Qualification
1	ACA	Brighton & Hove Albion U21	3	2	0	1	0	5	1	+4	7	Advance to Round 2
2	L2	Leyton Orient	3	1	1	0	1	3	4	−1	5	Advance to Round 2
3	L1	AFC Wimbledon	3	1	0	0	2	4	5	−1	3	
4	L1	Southend United	3	1	0	0	2	3	5	−2	3	

Source: EFL.com

3 September 2019	AFC Wimbledon	0–2	Brighton & Hove Albion U21	Kingston upon Thames
19:45 BST		Report	Tzanev 52' (o.g.); Radulovic 89'	Stadium: Kingsmeadow; Attendance: 388

3 September 2019	Leyton Orient	2–0	Southend United	Leyton
19:45 BST	Happe 6'; Gorman 90'	Report		Stadium: Brisbane Road; Attendance: 1,562

1 October 2019	Southend United	0–2	Brighton & Hove Albion U21	Southend-on-Sea
19:45 BST		Report	Richards 50'; O'Hora 81'	Stadium: Roots Hall; Attendance: 641; Referee: Sam Purkiss

8 October 2019	AFC Wimbledon	3–0	Leyton Orient	Kingston upon Thames
19:30 BST	Pigott 3' (pen.); Folivi 49'; Reilly 79'	Report		Stadium: Kingsmeadow; Attendance: 642

6 November 2019	Leyton Orient	1–1 (4–2 p)	Brighton & Hove Albion U21	Leyton
19:30 GMT	Dennis 63'	Report	Cashman 33'	Stadium: Brisbane Road; Attendance: 709; Referee: Kevin Johnson
	Penalties
	Maguire-Drew (penalty scored); Clay (penalty scored); Dennis (penalty missed); Alabi (penalty scored); Dayton (penalty scored)		Cochrane (penalty missed); Davies (penalty scored); Jenks (penalty missed); Button (penalty scored)

13 November 2019	Southend United	3–1	AFC Wimbledon	Southend-on-Sea
19:45 GMT	Ralph 25'; Hamilton 45+1'; Hopper 80'	Report	Wood 35'	Stadium: Roots Hall; Attendance: 717

==== Group D ====
Pos	Div	Team	Pld	W	PW	PL	L	GF	GA	GD	Pts	Qualification
1	L2	Walsall	3	2	0	1	0	7	0	+7	7	Advance to Round 2
2	L1	Coventry City	3	1	1	1	0	3	2	+1	6	Advance to Round 2
3	L2	Forest Green Rovers	3	1	1	0	1	3	8	−5	5	
4	ACA	Southampton U21	3	0	0	0	3	4	7	−3	0	

Source: EFL.com

3 September 2019	Forest Green Rovers	3–2	Southampton U21	Nailsworth
19:45 BST	Stevens 29', 89'; Grubb 71'	Report	Hale 16'; N'Lundulu 80'	Stadium: The New Lawn; Attendance: 653

3 September 2019	Coventry City	0–0 (5–4 p)	Walsall	Birmingham
19:45 BST		Report 1		Stadium: St Andrew's; Attendance: 1,005
	Penalties
	Biamou (penalty scored); Bakayoko (penalty missed); McFadzean (penalty missed); Eccles (penalty scored); Bapaga (penalty scored); McCallum (penalty scored); Watson (penalty scored)		Gaffney (penalty missed); Norman (penalty scored); Adebayo (penalty missed); Hardy (penalty scored); Liddle (penalty scored); Bates (penalty scored); Kinsella (penalty missed)

1 October 2019	Walsall	1–0	Southampton U21	Walsall
19:45 BST	Scarr 45'	Report		Stadium: Bescot Stadium; Attendance: 732

8 October 2019	Forest Green Rovers	0–0 (8–7 p)	Coventry City	Nailsworth
19:30 BST		Report		Stadium: The New Lawn; Attendance: 924
	Penalties
	Stevens (penalty scored); Morton (penalty scored); Adams (penalty missed); Bernard (penalty scored); Mondal (penalty scored); Allen (penalty scored); Covil (penalty scored); McGinley (penalty scored); Godwin-Malife (penalty scored)		Godden (penalty scored); Westbrooke (penalty scored); O'Hare (penalty scored); Kelly (penalty missed); Rose (penalty scored); Watson (penalty scored); Eccles (penalty scored); McCallum (penalty scored); McFadzean (penalty missed)

5 November 2019	Coventry City	3–2	Southampton U21	Birmingham
19:30 GMT	Biamou 52', 55', 90+3'	Report	Slattery 61' (pen.), 84'	Stadium: St Andrew's; Attendance: 375

12 November 2019	Walsall	6–0	Forest Green Rovers	Walsall
19:45 GMT	Gordon 23', 33', 50' (pen.); McDonald 72'; Kinsella 74'; Norman 90'		Collins (yellow card) 51' (yellow-red card) 51'	Stadium: Bescot Stadium; Attendance: 621

==== Group E ====
Pos	Div	Team	Pld	W	PW	PL	L	GF	GA	GD	Pts	Qualification
1	L2	Exeter City	3	3	0	0	0	6	1	+5	9	Advance to Round 2
2	L2	Newport County	3	1	0	0	2	11	11	0	3	Advance to Round 2
3	ACA	West Ham United U21	3	1	0	0	2	9	11	−2	3	
4	L2	Cheltenham Town	3	1	0	0	2	8	11	−3	3	

Source: EFL.com

3 September 2019	Exeter City	1–0	Cheltenham Town	Exeter
19:45 BST	Ajose 5'	Report		Stadium: St James Park; Attendance: 786

4 September 2019	Newport County	4–5	West Ham United U21	Newport
19:45 BST	Abrahams 10'; Whitely 12'; Collins 32'; Hillier 42'	Report	Scully 1', 88'; Powell 47' (pen.); Parkes 53'; Corbett 83'	Stadium: Rodney Parade; Attendance: 581; Referee: John Busby

8 October 2019	Cheltenham Town	4–3	West Ham United U21	Cheltenham
19:45 BST	Smith 25', 55', 64'; Lloyd 67'	Report	Kemp 11', 31'; Rosa 34'	Stadium: Whaddon Road; Attendance: 1,020; Referee: Christopher Sarginson

8 October 2019	Newport County	0–2	Exeter City	Newport
19:30 BST		Report	Jay 40', 71'	Stadium: Rodney Parade; Attendance: 635

12 November 2019	Cheltenham Town	4–7	Newport County	Cheltenham
19:30 GMT	Sheaf 17'; Addai 34'; Long 37'; Tozer 84'	Report	Maloney 8', 45+2', 53'; Dolan 27' (pen.); Abrahams 30', 43', 68'	Stadium: Whaddon Road; Attendance: 774; Referee: Andy Woolmer

13 November 2019	Exeter City	3–1	West Ham United U21	Exeter
19:00 GMT	Randall 9', 88'; Tillson 78'	Report	Powell 18' (pen.)	Stadium: St James Park; Attendance: 807

==== Group F ====
Pos	Div	Team	Pld	W	PW	PL	L	GF	GA	GD	Pts	Qualification
1	L1	Bristol Rovers	3	2	0	1	0	4	2	+2	7	Advance to Round 2
2	ACA	Chelsea U21	3	2	0	0	1	5	4	+1	6	Advance to Round 2
3	L2	Plymouth Argyle	3	1	1	0	1	4	2	+2	5	
4	L2	Swindon Town	3	0	0	0	3	2	7	−5	0	

Source: EFL.com

6 August 2019	Swindon Town	2–3	Chelsea U21	Swindon
19:45 BST	Ballard 18'; May 47'	Report	Anjorin 12', 16'; Brown 60'	Stadium: County Ground; Attendance: 1,995; Referee: Alan Young

3 September 2019	Plymouth Argyle	1–1 (5–3 p)	Bristol Rovers	Plymouth
19:45 BST	Moore 40'	Report	Nichols 30'	Stadium: Home Park; Attendance: 2,518
	Penalties
	Rudden (penalty scored); Randell (penalty scored); Klaidi Lolos (penalty scored); Sarcevic (penalty scored); Cooper (penalty scored)		Bennett (penalty missed); Kelly (penalty scored); Craig (penalty scored); Adeboyejo (penalty scored)

24 September 2019	Bristol Rovers	2–1	Chelsea U21	Bristol
19:45 BST	Adeboyejo 59'; Sercombe 73'	Report	Brown 31'	Stadium: Memorial Stadium; Attendance: 1,144; Referee: Antony Coggins

8 October 2019	Swindon Town	0–3	Plymouth Argyle	Swindon
19:30 BST		Report	Rudden 15'; Grant 36'; Riley 66'	Stadium: County Ground; Attendance: 1,199

29 October 2019	Plymouth Argyle	0–1	Chelsea U21	Plymouth
19:30 GMT		Report	Russell 90+3'	Stadium: Home Park; Attendance: 1,725; Referee: John Busby

13 November 2019	Bristol Rovers	1–0	Swindon Town	Bristol
19:45 GMT	Little 73'	Report		Stadium: Memorial Stadium; Attendance: 1,083

==== Group G ====
Pos	Div	Team	Pld	W	PW	PL	L	GF	GA	GD	Pts	Qualification
1	L1	Milton Keynes Dons	3	2	0	0	1	5	2	+3	6	Advance to Round 2
2	L2	Stevenage	3	1	1	0	1	2	4	−2	5	Advance to Round 2
3	ACA	Fulham U21	3	1	0	1	1	3	3	0	4	
4	L1	Wycombe Wanderers	3	1	0	0	2	3	4	−1	3	

Source: EFL.com

3 September 2019	Stevenage	0–3	Milton Keynes Dons	Stevenage
19:45 BST		Report	McGrandles 16'; Nombe 78', 84'	Stadium: Broadhall Way; Attendance: 789

1 October 2019	Milton Keynes Dons	1–0	Fulham U21	Milton Keynes
19:45 BST	Agard 50'	Report		Stadium: Stadium MK; Attendance: 1,473; Referee: Darren Drysdale

8 October 2019	Wycombe Wanderers	0–1	Stevenage	High Wycombe
19:45 BST		Report	Cowley 6'	Stadium: Adams Park; Attendance: 766

29 October 2019	Stevenage	1–1 (4–2 p)	Fulham U21	Stevenage
19:30 GMT	Carter 35'	Report	Abraham 90+1'	Stadium: Broadhall Way; Attendance: 442
	Penalties
	Denton (penalty scored); Cowley (penalty scored); Byrom (penalty scored); Watts (penalty scored)		Carvalho (penalty missed); Taylor-Crossdale (penalty scored); Hilton (penalty missed); O'Riley (penalty scored)

5 November 2019	Wycombe Wanderers	1–2	Fulham U21	High Wycombe
19:30 GMT	Aarons 50'	Report	Harris 10'; Abraham 83'	Stadium: Adams Park; Attendance: 512

12 November 2019	Milton Keynes Dons	1–2	Wycombe Wanderers	Milton Keynes
19:45 GMT	Dickenson 32'; Agard (red card) 88'	Report	Ofoborh 58'; Phillips (red card) 88'; Parker 90+1'	Stadium: Stadium MK; Attendance: 1,101

==== Group H ====
Pos	Div	Team	Pld	W	PW	PL	L	GF	GA	GD	Pts	Qualification
1	L1	Peterborough United	3	3	0	0	0	5	1	+4	9	Advance to Round 2
2	L2	Northampton Town	3	1	1	0	1	2	3	−1	5	Advance to Round 2
3	ACA	Arsenal U21	3	0	1	1	1	2	3	−1	3	
4	L2	Cambridge United	3	0	0	1	2	2	4	−2	1	

Source: EFL.com

27 August 2019	Northampton Town	1–1 (4–3 p)	Arsenal U21	Northampton
19:45 BST	Hoskins 82'	Report	Olayinka 78'	Stadium: Sixfields Stadium; Attendance: 2,515; Referee: Robert Lewis
	Penalties
	Hoskins (penalty scored); McWilliams (penalty scored); Watson (penalty scored); Waters (penalty scored); Goode (penalty missed)		Coyle (penalty missed); Burton (penalty scored); Tormey (penalty scored); Balogun (penalty scored); Smith Rowe (penalty missed)

3 September 2019	Northampton Town	0–2	Peterborough United	Northampton
19:45 BST		Report	Kanu 21'; Dembélé 24'	Stadium: Sixfields Stadium; Attendance: 2,234

1 October 2019	Peterborough United	1–0	Arsenal U21	Peterborough
19:45 BST	Ward 66'	Report		Stadium: London Road Stadium; Attendance: 3,131

8 October 2019	Cambridge United	0–1	Northampton Town	Cambridge
19:30 GMT		Report	Smith 17'	Stadium: Abbey Stadium; Attendance: 764

5 November 2019	Cambridge United	1–1 (3–4 p)	Arsenal U21	Cambridge
19:30 GMT	O'Neil (yellow card) 32' (yellow-red card) 50'; Knibbs 40'	Report	John-Jules 59'	Stadium: Abbey Stadium; Attendance: 914
	Penalties
	Maris (penalty scored); Smith (penalty scored); Dunk (penalty missed); Lambe (penalty scored); Jones (penalty missed)		Omole (penalty missed); Greenwood (penalty scored); Burton (penalty scored); Medley (penalty scored); Cottrell (penalty scored)

12 November 2019	Peterborough United	2–1	Cambridge United	Peterborough
19:45 GMT	Ward 9'; Jones 30'	Report	Knibbs 79'	Stadium: London Road Stadium; Attendance: 3,425; Referee: Chris Pollard

== Round 2 ==
=== Northern Section ===
26 November 2019	Everton U21	0–4	Fleetwood Town	Liverpool
19:45 GMT			Andrew 2'; Coutts 75'; Madden 79'; Burns 87'	Stadium: Goodison Park; Attendance: 624

27 November 2019	Blackpool	1–3	Scunthorpe United	Blackpool
19:45 GMT	Guy (yellow card) 19' (yellow-red card) 73'; Nuttall 70'	Report	van Veen 12'; Eisa 25', 90'	Stadium: Bloomfield Road; Attendance: 1,196

3 December 2019	Port Vale	2–2 (4–2 p)	Mansfield Town	Stoke-on-Trent
19:45 GMT	Browne 64'; Taylor 82'	Report	Hamilton 50'; Sterling-James 90+2'	Stadium: Vale Park; Attendance: 1,164; Referee: Marc Edwards
	Penalties
	Joyce (penalty scored); Taylor (penalty scored); Burgess (penalty scored); Atkinson (penalty scored)		Hamilton (penalty missed); Mellis (penalty scored); Benning (penalty missed); Knowles (penalty scored)

3 December 2019	Salford City	3–0	Wolverhampton Wanderers U21	Salford
19:45 GMT	Armstrong 43', 47'; Towell 87'	Report		Stadium: Moor Lane; Attendance: 505

3 December 2019	Shrewsbury Town	1–1 (5–6 p)	Manchester City U21	Shrewsbury
19:45 GMT	Golbourne 24'	Report	Doyle 68'	Stadium: New Meadow; Attendance: 1,384; Referee: Peter Wright
	Penalties
	Norburn (penalty scored); Walker (penalty scored); Edwards (penalty scored); Okenabirhie (penalty scored); Goss (penalty scored); Golbourne (penalty missed)		Doyle (penalty scored); McDonald (penalty scored); Fiorini (penalty scored); Bernabe (penalty scored); Simmonds (penalty scored); Poveda (penalty scored)

4 December 2019	Doncaster Rovers	0–3	Leicester City U21	Doncaster
19:45 GMT		Report	Muskwe 13', 66'; Hirst 89'	Stadium: Keepmoat Stadium; Attendance: 1,322; Referee: Ollie Yates

4 December 2019	Tranmere Rovers	3–2	Manchester United U21	Birkenhead
19:45 GMT	Hepburn-Murphy 2'; Jennings 40'; Blackett-Taylor 54'	Report	Chong 9', 31'; Sotona (red card) 90+17'	Stadium: Prenton Park; Attendance: 632; Referee: Ross Joyce

10 December 2019	Accrington Stanley	2–0	Bolton Wanderers	Accrington
19:45 GMT	Zanzala 10'; Bishop 85'			Stadium: Wham Stadium; Attendance: 930

=== Southern Section ===
3 December 2019	Brighton & Hove Albion U21	0–0 (4–5 p)	Newport County	Brighton
19:00 GMT		Report		Stadium: Amex Stadium; Attendance: 292; Referee: Sam Perkiss
	Penalties
	Davies (penalty scored); Cashman (penalty scored); Gwargis (penalty scored); Yapi (penalty scored); Tolaj (penalty missed)		Abrahams (penalty scored); Haynes (penalty scored); Matt (penalty scored); Maloney (penalty scored); Nurse (penalty scored)

3 December 2019	Colchester United	1–2	Stevenage	Colchester
19:30 GMT	Stokes 61' (o.g.)	Report	Cowley 4', 31'	Stadium: Colchester Community Stadium; Attendance: 959; Referee: Neil Hair

3 December 2019	Walsall	3–2	Chelsea U21	Walsall
19:45 GMT	Lavery 52' (pen.); McDonald 79'; Scarr 90+4'	Report	Lamptey 2', 10'	Stadium: Bescot Stadium; Attendance: 941

3 December 2019	Portsmouth	2–1	Northampton Town	Portsmouth
19:45 GMT	Maloney 39'; Harness 62'	Report	Harriman 12'	Stadium: Fratton Park; Attendance: 2,413

3 December 2019	Milton Keynes Dons	2–0	Coventry City	Milton Keynes
19:45 GMT	Agard 62'; Mason 71'; Dickenson (yellow card) 78' (yellow-red card) 85'	Report		Stadium: Stadium MK; Attendance: 1,686

4 December 2019	Exeter City	0–0 (3–0 p)	Oxford United	Exeter
19:00 GMT		Report		Stadium: St James Park; Attendance: 483; Referee: Kevin Johnson
	Penalties
	Jay (penalty scored); Sweeney (penalty scored); Seymour (penalty scored)		(penalty missed) Forde; (penalty missed) Hall; (penalty missed) Sykes

4 December 2019	Peterborough United	1–1 (5–6 p)	Ipswich Town	Peterborough
19:30 GMT	Jones 32'	Report	El Mizouni 23'	Stadium: Weston Homes Stadium; Attendance: 2,310; Referee: Graham Salisbury
	Penalties
	Eisa (penalty scored); Toney (penalty scored); Dembélé (penalty missed); Butler (penalty scored); Mason (penalty scored); Barker (penalty scored); Kent (penalty missed)		Roberts (penalty scored); McGavin (penalty missed); Kenlock (penalty scored); El Mizouni (penalty scored); Norwood (penalty scored); Huws (penalty scored); Cotter (penalty scored)

4 December 2019	Bristol Rovers	1–1 (4–2 p)	Leyton Orient	Bristol
19:45 GMT	Kilgour 16'	Report	Angol 20'	Stadium: Memorial Stadium; Attendance: 865
	Penalties
	Clarke-Harris (penalty scored); Rodman (penalty scored); Craig (penalty scored); Sercombe (penalty scored)		Wright (penalty missed); Harrold (penalty scored); Marsh (penalty scored); Sotiriou (penalty missed)

== Round 3 ==
=== Northern Section ===
7 January 2020	Salford City	3–0	Port Vale	Salford
19:45 GMT	Burgess 35'; Armstrong 79'; Jervis 84'	Report		Stadium: Moor Lane; Attendance: 630

7 January 2020	Tranmere Rovers	1–2	Leicester City U21	Birkenhead
19:45 GMT	Gilmour 31'	https://www.skysports.com/football/tranmere-rovers-vs-leicester-city-u21/421695	Hirst 52'; Muskwe 74'	Stadium: Prenton Park; Attendance: 901

7 January 2020	Fleetwood Town	2–2 (3–5 p)	Accrington Stanley	Fleetwood
19:45 GMT	Morris 50'; Andrew 68'	Report	Pritchard 35'; Sykes 90'	Stadium: Highbury Stadium; Attendance: 548
	Penalties
	Madden (penalty missed); Andrew (penalty scored); McAleny (penalty scored); Biggins (penalty scored)		Bursik (penalty scored); Pritchard (penalty scored); Opoku (penalty scored); Charles (penalty scored); Finley (penalty scored)

8 January 2020	Scunthorpe United	3–1	Manchester City U21	Scunthorpe
19:45 GMT	van Veen 9', 28'; Lund 32'	Report	Doyle 71' (pen.)	Stadium: Glanford Park; Attendance: 1,270

=== Southern Section ===
4 January 2020	Exeter City	2–1	Ipswich Town	Exeter
15:00 GMT	Ajose 45'; Martin 90+3'	Report	Keane 57'	Stadium: St James Park; Attendance: 2,299; Referee: Josh Smith

7 January 2020	Newport County	3–0	Milton Keynes Dons	Newport
19:30 GMT	Abrahams 4'; Amond 25'; Sorinola 35' (o.g.)	Report		Stadium: Rodney Parade; Attendance: 767; Referee: John Busby

7 January 2020	Walsall	1–2	Portsmouth	Walsall
19:45 GMT	Lavery 86' (pen.)	Report	Marquis 23'; Harrison 82'	Stadium: Bescot Stadium; Attendance: 1,082

8 January 2020	Bristol Rovers	0–1	Stevenage	Bristol
19:45 GMT	Upson (yellow card) 74' (yellow-red card) 87'		Mackail-Smith 17'	Stadium: Memorial Stadium; Attendance: 1,180

== Quarter-finals ==
4 February 2020	Newport County	1–0	Leicester City U21	Newport
19:00 GMT	Bennett 13'	Report		Stadium: Rodney Parade; Attendance: 1,357; Referee: Ben Toner
Note: Originally scheduled for 21 January, postponed due to a frozen pitch.

21 January 2020	Exeter City	3–0	Stevenage	Exeter
19:45 GMT	Ajose 25'; Jay 30', 48'	Report		Stadium: St James Park; Attendance: 1,190; Referee: Antony Coggins

21 January 2020	Salford City	2–1	Accrington Stanley	Salford
19:45 GMT	Burgess 45+3'; Elliott 49'	Report	Finley 11'	Stadium: Moor Lane; Attendance: 1,401

21 January 2020	Portsmouth	2–1	Scunthorpe United	Portsmouth
19:45 GMT	Marquis 13'; McGeehan 66'	Report	Eisa 62'	Stadium: Fratton Park; Attendance: 5,832

== Semi-finals ==
18 February 2020	Portsmouth	3–2	Exeter City	Portsmouth
19:45 GMT	Harness 86'; McGeehan 90+1'; Marquis 90+6'	Report	Taylor 79'; Burgess 89' (o.g.)	Stadium: Fratton Park; Attendance: 14,735; Referee: Craig Hicks

19 February 2020	Newport County	0–0 (5–6 p)	Salford City	Newport
19:45 GMT		Report		Stadium: Rodney Parade; Attendance: 4,070; Referee: Anthony Backhouse
	Penalties
	Demetriou (penalty scored); Sheehan (penalty scored); Abrahams (penalty missed); Labadie (penalty scored); Dolan (penalty scored); Matt (penalty scored); Inniss (penalty missed)		Rooney (penalty scored); Touray (penalty scored); Jervis (penalty scored); Conway (penalty scored); Thomas-Asante (penalty missed); Gibson (penalty scored); Wilson (penalty scored)

== Final ==
13 March 2021
15:00 GMT

Portsmouth	0–0 (a.e.t.)	Salford City
	Report
Penalties
Williams (penalty missed); Curtis (penalty missed); Brown (penalty scored); Raggett (penalty scored)	2–4	(penalty scored) Burgess; (penalty scored) Dieseruvwe; (penalty scored) Thomas-Asante; (penalty scored) Lowe

Wembley Stadium, London
Attendance: 0
Referee: Carl Boyeson
