= Callum Jones =

Callum Jones may refer to:

- Callum Jones (footballer, born 2001), Welsh football midfielder
- Callum Jones (footballer, born 2002), Welsh football defender
- Callum Rebecchi, also known as Callum Jones, fictional character from Australian soap opera Neighbours
