= Ryan George =

Welsh footballer (born 2001)

Personal information
- Full name: Ryan James George
- Date of birth: 27 November 2001 (age 24)
- Position: Defender

Team information
- Current team: Briton Ferry Llansawel
- Number: 18

Youth career
- Newport County

Senior career*
| Years | Team | Apps | (Gls) |
| 2019–2020 | Newport County | 0 | (0) |
| 2021 | Redditch United | | |
| 2021–2023 | Haverfordwest County | 13 | (1) |
| 2023– | Briton Ferry Llansawel | 75 | (1) |
- * Club domestic league appearances and goals as of 05:59, 10 October 2026 (UTC)

Ryan James George (born 27 November 2001) is a Welsh professional footballer who plays as a defender for Briton Ferry Llansawel.

== Playing career ==
George is a product of the Newport County Academy. On 8 October 2019 George made his debut for Newport as a half time substitute for Elis Watts in the 2-0 defeat to Exeter City in the EFL Trophy Southern Group E. George was released by Newport County at the end of the 2019–20 season.

In December 2021 he joined Haverfordwest County before a move to Briton Ferry Llansawel in the 2024–25 season.

== Career statistics ==
As of 27 March 2020

Appearances and goals by club, season and competition
| Club | Season | League | | | FA Cup | | League Cup | | Other | | Total | |
| Club | Season | Division | Apps | Goals | Apps | Goals | Apps | Goals | Apps | Goals | Apps | Goals |
|---|---|---|---|---|---|---|---|---|---|---|---|---|
| Newport County | 2019–20 | League Two | 0 | 0 | 0 | 0 | 0 | 0 | 1 (Note: Appearance(s) in EFL Trophy) | 0 | 1 | 0 |
| Career total | | | 0 | 0 | 0 | 0 | 0 | 0 | 1 | 0 | 1 | 0 |
