= Lazar Stojsavljević =

Serbian footballer

Personal information
- Full name: Lazar Stojsavljević
- Date of birth: 5 May 1998 (age 28)
- Place of birth: London, England
- Height: 1.91 m (6 ft 3 in)
- Position: Centre-back

Youth career
- 2013–2017: Woking

Senior career*
Years	Team	Apps	(Gls)
2017–2018	Woking	6	(1)
2018–2019	Millwall	0	(0)
2019	Newport County	0	(0)
2020–2021	Vojvodina	0	(0)
2020–2021	→ Rad (loan)	21	(1)
2021–2025	AS Trenčín	84	(6)
2021	→ Dubnica (loan)	4	(0)
2025	Sochi	7	(0)
2025–2026	Spartak Trnava	19	(0)
- * Club domestic league appearances and goals as of 16 May 2026

Lazar Stojsavljević (Serbian Cyrillic: Лазар Стојсављевић; born 5 May 1998) is a Serbian professional footballer who plays as a centre-back.

== Club career ==
=== Woking ===
Stojsavljević started his career at National League side Woking, first in the side's development team in 2013, followed by the Under 23s side. On 3 October 2017, he made his debut for the club, replacing Fabio Saraiva in the 71st minute during Woking's 2–0 away league victory over Chester. In January 2018, despite scoring the eventual winner and his first goal for the club, Stojsavljević suffered an extended period of absence after a fractured skull caused during a header in their 1–0 home victory against AFC Fylde.

=== Milwall ===
He went onto make six appearances for the club, scoring once, before signing for Millwall after a trial period. On 16 May 2019, Millwall announced that Stojsavljević would be released at the end of his current deal.

=== Newport County ===
On 14 June 2019, it was announced that he had signed for Newport County on a two-year deal. Stojsavljević played for 29 minutes in his only appearance for Newport, in their 13 August EFL Cup first round win against Gillingham, and was substituted off shortly after Newport went 1-0 down. He subsequently left Newport County by mutual consent on 3 September 2019, and is now a free agent after only three months with the South Wales side. Newport manager Michael Flynn told the media in September 2019 that Stojsavljević had requested the contract termination and that the club had no financial burden from terminating the deal. Stojsavljević reportedly returned to Serbia to pursue a footballing opportunity "in his home town". Flynn went on to say that in hindsight, he would not have signed Stojsavljevic, nor fellow defender Marvel Ekpiteta, as they were only stopgap signings while uncertainty continued around the re-signing of Mickey Demetriou, who later re-signed with Newport.

=== Vojvodina ===
In January 2020, he signed for Vojvodina on a contract until January 2024. On 27 August 2020, in order to gain more first-team experience, Stojsavljević joined fellow Serbian SuperLiga side, Rad on a six-month loan deal and went onto make his debut during a 3–1 victory over Napredak Kruševac.

=== AS Trenčín ===
On 5 September 2021, Stojsavljević joined Slovak side, AS Trenčín and was immediately loaned out to second-tier side Dubnica, where he made his debut during a 1–0 home defeat to Dukla Banská Bystrica. Stojsavljević returned to AS Trenčín towards the end of October that year, eventually making his club debut during a Slovak Cup fourth round tie against TJD Príbelce, playing the full 90 minutes in the 3–0 victory.

=== Sochi ===
On 20 February 2025, Stojsavljević signed with Sochi in Russia. On 11 September 2025, he left Sochi by mutual consent.

=== Spartak Trnava ===
On 15 September 2025, it was announced that Stojsavljević would be returning to Slovakia, this time to FC Spartak Trnava.

== Career statistics ==
As of 28 May 2025.

Club	Season	League			National Cup		League Cup		Other		Total	
Club	Season	Division	Apps	Goals	Apps	Goals	Apps	Goals	Apps	Goals	Apps	Goals
Woking	2017–18	National League	6	1	0	0	—		0	0	6	1
Millwall	2018–19	Championship	0	0	0	0	0	0	—		0	0
Newport County	2019–20	League Two	0	0	0	0	0	0	1 (Note: Appearance(s) in EFL Trophy.)	0	1	0
Vojvodina	2019–20	Serbian SuperLiga	0	0	1	0	—		—		1	0
Vojvodina	2020–21	Serbian SuperLiga	0	0	0	0	—		—		0	0
Vojvodina	Total		0	0	1	0	—		—		1	0
Rad (loan)	2020–21	Serbian SuperLiga	21	1	1	0	—		—		22	1
AS Trenčín	2021–22	Slovak First League	15	0	4	0	—		—		19	0
AS Trenčín	2022–23	Slovak First League	25	3	3	0	—		—		28	3
AS Trenčín	2023–24	Slovak First League	26	0	0	0	—		—		26	0
AS Trenčín	2024–25	Slovak First League	18	3	2	0	—		—		20	3
AS Trenčín	Total		84	6	9	0	—		—		93	6
Dubnica (loan)	2021–22	2. liga	4	0	0	0	—		—		4	0
Sochi	2024–25	Russian First League	7	0	0	0	—		—		7	0
Career total			122	8	11	0	0	0	1	0	134	8
