= Rowan McDonald =

English footballer (born 2001)

Personal information
- Full name: Rowan Alexander McDonald
- Date of birth: 20 October 2001 (age 25)
- Place of birth: Oldham, England
- Height: 1.80 m (5 ft 11 in)
- Position: Midfielder

Team information
- Current team: Coleraine
- Number: 21

Youth career
- –2023: Manchester City

Senior career*
Years	Team	Apps	(Gls)
2023–2025	Waterford	59	(2)
2025–	Coleraine	20	(0)

International career^{‡}
2019	England U18	2	(0)
- * Club domestic league appearances and goals as of 29 April 2026 ‡ National team caps and goals as of 10:17, 25 March 2025 (UTC)

Rowan Alexander McDonald (born 20 October 2001) is an English professional footballer who plays as a midfielder for NIFL Premiership club Coleraine.

== Club career ==
=== Youth career ===
Born in Oldham, McDonald came through the Academy of Manchester City, where he won the U18 Premier League and U18 Premier League Cup twice each, the FA Youth Cup in 2020, as well as the Premier League 2 three times. He featured 5 times for the club's U21 side in the 2019–20 EFL Trophy, as well as representing the club in the UEFA Youth League. On 8 July 2022, he signed his first professional contract with the club, despite having missed most of the 2 years previous due to injury. In January 2023, he went on trial with League of Ireland Premier Division club Derry City during their pre-season training camp in Spain, but ultimately did not sign for the club despite appearing in friendly fixtures with them. In June 2023, he was released by Manchester City following the end of his contract.

=== Waterford ===
On 23 August 2023, McDonald signed for League of Ireland First Division club Waterford until the end of their season in November. On 10 November 2023, he helped the club to promotion by beating Cork City in the Final of the 2023 League of Ireland First Division Play-offs at Tallaght Stadium. After gaining promotion, he signed a new contract with the club ahead of their 2024 League of Ireland Premier Division campaign. On 9 August 2024, McDonald scored his first goal for the club, with his side's first goal of the game, helping them back from a 2 goal deficit to win 3–2 away to Bohemians at Dalymount Park. On 21 November 2024, he signed a new one year contract with the club. On 15 February 2025, he scored in the opening game of the season, scoring the first goal of the game in a 3–2 win away to Sligo Rovers at The Showgrounds. He departed the club in September 2025, having scored 2 goals in 66 appearances during his time there.

=== Coleraine ===
On 1 September 2025, McDonald signed for NIFL Premiership club Coleraine on a long-term contract for an undisclosed fee.

== International career ==
McDonald made his international debut on 20 May 2019, playing the full 90 minutes in England U18's 1–0 win over Russia U18 in a friendly in Slovakia. 3 days later he again played the full game in a 2–0 win over Mexico U18 in what turned out to be his final appearance at international level.

== Career statistics ==
As of match played on 29 August 2025

Appearances and goals by club, season and competition
Club	Season	League			National Cup (Note: Includes FAI Cup & Irish Cup)		League Cup (Note: Includes Northern Ireland Football League Cup)		Other		Total	
Club	Season	Division	Apps	Goals	Apps	Goals	Apps	Goals	Apps	Goals	Apps	Goals
Manchester City U21	2019–20	—			—		—		5 (Note: Appearance(s) in the EFL Trophy)	0	5	0
Waterford	2023	LOI First Division	6	0	—		—		4 (Note: Appearances in the 2023 League of Ireland First Division Play-offs)	0	10	0
Waterford	2024	LOI Premier Division	32	1	0	0	—		0 (Note: Appearance(s) in the Munster Senior Cup)	0	32	1
Waterford	2025	LOI Premier Division	21	1	2	0	—		1	0	24	1
Waterford	Total		59	2	2	0	—		5	0	66	2
Coleraine	2025–26	NIFL Premiership	0	0	0	0	0	0	—		0	0
Career Total			59	2	2	0	0	0	10	0	71	2

== Honours ==
Waterford

- Munster Senior Cup (1): 2023–24

Manchester City Academy

- Premier League 2 (3): 2020–21, 2021–22, 2022–23
- U18 Premier League (2): 2020–21, 2021–22
- FA Youth Cup (1): 2019–20
- U18 Premier League Cup (2): 2018–19, 2019–20
