= Merthyr Town F.C. =

Welsh football club

Merthyr Town
- Full name: Merthyr Town Football Club
- Nickname: The Martyrs
- Founded: 1908; 118 years ago (founded); 2010; 16 years ago (reformed)
- Ground: Penydarren Park
- Capacity: 4,000
- Owner: Merthyr Town FC Supporters Society
- Chairman: Les Barlow
- Manager: Paul Michael
- League: National League North
- 2025–26: National League North, 8th of 24
- Website: merthyrtownfc.co.uk
Home colours	Away colours	Third colours

Merthyr Town Football Club (Welsh: Clwb Pêl-droed Tref Merthyr) is a Welsh semi-professional football club based in Merthyr Tydfil, currently playing in the National League North, the sixth tier of the English football league system.

The football club was originally founded as Merthyr Town in 1908 and played in the Football League from 1920 to 1930, but the club folded in 1934. The club was then replaced by the new Merthyr Tydfil F.C. in 1945, until 2010 when that club liquidated and re-established back to its original "Merthyr Town" name. The club was then accepted into Division One of the Western League.

The club played in the fifth tier of English football for five years, from 1988–89 to 1994–95. In 1991–92 they finished fourth in the Football Conference (now National League), the club's highest ever placing in the English football pyramid. They were relegated in 1994–95. Merthyr have reached the second round of the FA Cup on five occasions, in 1946–47, 1954–55, 1973–74, 1979–80 and 1990–91. Most recently they reached the competition's first round in 2022–23.

== History ==
=== Early years (1909–1934) ===
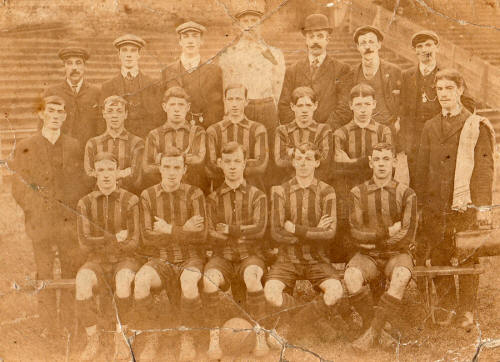
The Merthyr Town team of 1909

In 1909, Merthyr Town joined the second division of the Southern League, which despite being primarily an English league, contained several other Welsh clubs, notably Cardiff City, Newport County and Swansea Town. After finishing third in 1911–12 the club were promoted to the first division, though they were relegated back to the second division in 1913–14. The Southern League did not operate during the First World War, and when it resumed for the 1919–20 season Merthyr were placed back in the top division.

In the summer of 1920 the Football League expanded with the creation of a new Third Division, which was made up entirely of the First Division of the Southern League from the previous season. Despite having finished second bottom in the season before, usually a relegation place, Merthyr became a new member of the Football League.

In their first season in the Football League, the club had a much better season and finished 8th. This, however, proved to be their most successful league season, and it was followed by a gradual decline: 11th in 1921–22 and 17th in 1922–23. The 1923–24 season saw a slight improvement in league form as they finished 13th, but the major news was their appearance in the final of the Welsh Cup, though they lost 1–0 to Wrexham in a replay after a 2–2 draw.

From then on the club declined further, and finished bottom of the Third Division in 1924–25. Although they finished 14th in 1925–26, in the following seasons the club finished 17th, 21st, 20th and then bottom again, and were eventually voted out of the Football League in 1930. They were replaced by the ill-fated Thames. During their penultimate season in the Football League the club had their best season in the FA Cup, getting past the first round for the only time, before losing to Watford in the second round. The club dropped back into the Southern League, but lasted only four seasons, before ceasing to play in 1934.

=== Merthyr Tydfil years (1945–2010) ===
The club re-emerged as Merthyr Tydfil F.C., formed in 1945, and joined the Welsh League. In their first season, they finished as runners-up and joined the Southern League. The club were immensely successful in their first few seasons, winning the championship in 1947–48, 1949–50, 1950–51, 1951–52 and 1953–54. In the 1947–48 championship-winning season, Merthyr only dropped one point at home (against Colchester United) and only lost four games all season. However, despite their success, the club failed to be elected to the English Football League. The 1950–51 season ended with Merthyr winning the Southern League, the Welsh Cup, the Southern League Cup and the Welsh Challenge Cup.

After bouncing between the various Southern League divisions during the 1960s, 1970s and 1980s, the club finally won their sixth championship in 1988–89, making them joint Southern League title record-holders together with Southampton. This time, winning the championship meant promotion to the Football Conference, the fifth level of English football. The club finished ninth in their first two seasons, and then fourth. However, they then went into decline, and were relegated back to the Southern League in 1995, where they remained until reforming in 2010. They should have been relegated a season earlier, but were reprieved when Northern Premier League champions Marine failed to meet the stadium criteria for the league.

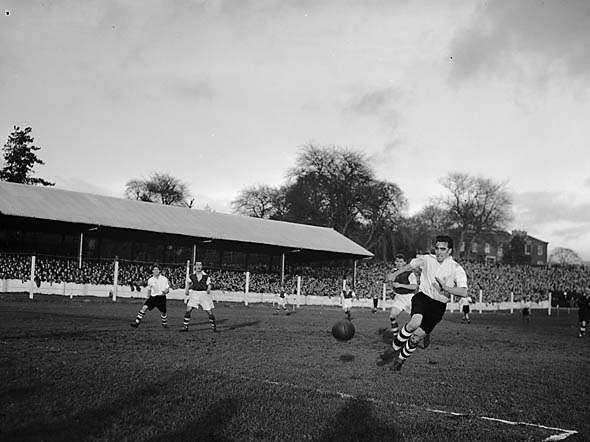
Merthyr against Ipswich Town in 1951

The club's best FA Cup performance was reaching the second round, which they managed in 1946–47 (losing 3–1 to Reading), 1954–55 (losing 7–1 to Bradford City), 1973–74 (losing 3–0 to Hendon), 1979–80 (losing 3–1 in a replay with Chesham United) and 1990–91 (losing 5–1 to Woking). The only time the club managed to defeat a Football League club in the FA Cup was in the first round of the 1946–47 cup, when they beat Bristol Rovers 3–1. The club were considerably more successful in the Welsh Cup, which they won on three occasions: 1949 (beating Swansea Town 2–0), 1951 (beating Cardiff City 3–2 in a replay) and 1987 (beating Newport County 1–0 in a replay). In addition, the club finished as runners-up in 1947 and 1952.

After winning the final in 1987, the club were allowed to enter the European Cup Winners' Cup, at a time when English clubs were banned from European competition. In the first round, they were drawn against the Italian club Atalanta. The club managed a win in the first leg at home, beating the Italians 2–1. However, the return leg was lost 2–0, and the club was eliminated from the competition. Historically, the club's biggest rivals are Gloucester City. The two clubs played over 120 times in their history, making it one of the most played Anglo-Welsh derbies in football. In the late 1990s and early 2000s Newport County were local rivals but the teams have not met in the same league for many years.

=== 2010–present ===
In 2010, Merthyr Tydfil F.C. of the Southern Football League was liquidated. A new club under the name of Merthyr Town was formed and joined the Western Football League. The club used Rhiw'r Ddar, shared with Taff's Well A.F.C., as its home ground. Promotion from the First Division to the Premier Division of the Western League was achieved in the first season and the club moved to Penydarren Park for the 2011–12 season. Promotion to the Southern League was achieved in 2012.

The team reached the first round proper of the 2022–23 FA Cup, where they lost 2–0 to Buxton. The 2024–25 season saw the club promoted to the National League system as Southern League Premier Division South champions after nine years in the division.

They are currently playing in the National League North, the sixth tier of the English football league system.

== Stadium ==
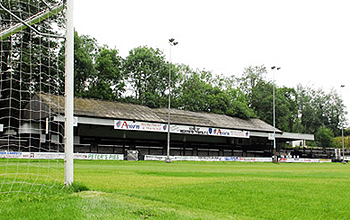
Penydarren Park, home of all Merthyr football clubs.

Throughout Merthyr Town's history, their home venue has been Penydarren Park. The site was once used by the Romans for their local military encampment and during the industrial revolution it became part of the Penydarren House estate. In the latter half of the nineteenth century Penydarren Park was used by the locals as an open recreational for walks, athletic competitions and team sports. It was redeveloped in the 1890s with a cinder running track and a cycling track added to cater for the fad in foot and cycle racing. An early attempt to bring rugby league to Wales, saw local team Merthyr Tydfil RLFC set up at the rival College Ground. This in turn led to the larger Penydarren Park being host to the first touring Australian rugby league side where they faced a Wales XIII in front of a crowd of 6,000.

There were plans for Merthyr to move to a new stadium on the edge of the town. The stadium would have been part of the new 'Merthyr Village' development and have a capacity of around 12,000. These plans were thrown into doubt by the Welsh Government's rejection of the project in 2007. In July 2011, the newly promoted Merthyr Town FC hosted Welsh Premier League side Llanelli in a pre-season friendly at Penydarren Park, and thereafter took up full-time residency.

== Current squad ==
As of 17 August 2026

Note: Flags indicate national team as defined under FIFA eligibility rules; some limited exceptions apply. Players may hold more than one non-FIFA nationality.

No.	Pos.	Nation	Player
1	GK	AUS	Jaimie Cogman
2	DF	WAL	Callum Ryan-Phillips
3	DF	WAL	Jay Foulston
4	MF	WAL	Aneurin Livermore
5	DF	WAL	Ben Margetson
6	DF	WAL	Lloyd Humphries
7	FW	WAL	Morgan Wigley
8	MF	ENG	Jacob Maddox
9	FW	ENG	Kane Simpson
10	FW	WAL	Sam Pearson

No.	Pos.	Nation	Player
11	FW	WAL	Elis Watts
13	GK	WAL	Miles Thomas
14	MF	WAL	Jack Evans
15	DF	ENG	Noah Smerdon
17	DF	WAL	Matthew Harris
18	FW	WAL	Iwan John
19	MF	WAL	Kieran Evans
21	DF	WAL	Jay Williams
31	MF	WAL	Lee Lucas
35	DF	WAL	Will Spiers

=== Out on loan ===
Note: Flags indicate national team as defined under FIFA eligibility rules; some limited exceptions apply. Players may hold more than one non-FIFA nationality.

No.	Pos.	Nation	Player

== Notable former players ==
For all players with a Wikipedia article see Category:Merthyr Town F.C. players.

== Management ==
Position	Name
Chairman	Les Barlow
Manager	Paul Michael
Assistant manager	Andrew Smith
Player First-team coach	Craig Reddy
Player Coach	Matthew Harris
Goalkeeping Coach	Nicky Church
Head of Medical Support	Kevin Brain
Kit Manager	Jeffrey Hurley
Academy Director	Craig Reddy
Performance Analyst	Ben Millard
Football Secretary & First Team Operations	Jack Hodgkins
Programme Editor	John Strand

== Records ==
- Best FA Cup performance: Second round, 1928–29
- Best FA Trophy performance: Third round, 2026–27
- Best FA Vase performance: Second qualifying round, 2010–11, 2011–12
- Best Welsh Cup performance: Runners-up, 1923–24 (replay)

== Honours ==
League

- Welsh Football League
  - Winners (1): 1930–31
- Southern Football League Division Two
  - Winners (1): 1912
- Southern Football League Premier Division South
  - Winners (1): 2024–25
- Glamorgan League
  - Winners (1): 1910–11
- Southern Football League Division One South & West
  - Winners (1): 2014–15
- Western Football League Premier Division
  - Winners (1): 2011–12
- Western Football League Division One
  - Winners (1): 2010–11

Cups

- Welsh Cup
  - Winners: 1949, 1951, 1987
  - Runners-up: (1) 1924
- Welsh Football League Cup
  - Winners (1): 1926
- South Wales Cup
  - Winners (1): 1931
- Southern League Cup
  - Winners (1): 2015–16

== See also ==
- Category:Merthyr Town F.C. players
