= Elis Watts =

Welsh association football player

Personal information
- Full name: Elis William Watts
- Date of birth: 28 June 2002 (age 24)
- Place of birth: Pontypridd, Wales
- Height: 1.84 m (6 ft 0 in)
- Position: Midfielder

Team information
- Current team: Merthyr Town
- Number: 11

Youth career
- Cambrian & Clydach Vale
- Cardiff City
- 2014–2020: Newport County

Senior career*
Years	Team	Apps	(Gls)
2019–2020	Newport County	0	(0)
2020	→ Bristol Manor Farm (loan)	6	(0)
2020–2022	Aldershot Town	6	(0)
2020	→ Metropolitan Police (loan)	0	(0)
2021	→ Farnborough (loan)	9	(3)
2022	→ Hayes & Yeading United (loan)	13	(1)
2022	→ Weston-super-Mare (loan)	8	(1)
2022–2023	Weston-super-Mare	31	(3)
2023–2025	Hungerford Town	55	(22)
2025–2026	Gloucester City	55	(17)
2026–	Merthyr Town	0	(0)
- * Club domestic league appearances and goals as of 21:23, 29 June 2026 (UTC)

Elis William Watts (born 28 June 2002) is a Welsh professional footballer who plays as a midfielder for National League North club Merthyr Town.

== Career ==
Watts played for Cambrian & Clydach and Cardiff City Academy before joining the Newport County Academy in 2014. On 4 September 2019, Watts made his debut for Newport in the starting line up for the 5–4 defeat to West Ham United Under-21s in the EFL Trophy Southern Group E. On 18 January 2020, Watts joined Bristol Manor Farm on loan until the end of the 2019–20 season. Watts was released by Newport County at the end of the 2019–20 season.

Having joined Aldershot Town following his release from Newport, Watts was promoted to the club's first-team set up on a full time basis in May 2021. Watts spent time on loan at Metropolitan Police in October 2020, featuring twice for their under-23 side, scoring twice. He made his Aldershot debut on the opening day of the 2021–22 season, coming on as a 90th minute substitute in a 2–0 home defeat to Chesterfield. On 15 October 2021, Watts joined Farnborough on loan until January 2022, scoring on his debut a day later, during their 4–0 victory over Kings Langley. He went onto feature ten times in all competitions, scoring three goals before being recalled by Aldershot towards the end of 2021. On 5 January 2022, Watts joined Hayes & Yeading United on an initial one-month loan deal. Watts featured twelve times, scoring once for the club before returning to Aldershot and immediately joining Weston-super-Mare on loan for the remainder of the campaign. On 16 May 2022, Watts announced via Twitter that he would be leaving the club at the end of his contract.

On 16 July 2022, Watts returned to Weston-super-Mare on a permanent basis having spent time on loan with the club the previous season after a successful pre-season.

On 4 August 2023, following his departure from Weston-super-Mare, Watts agreed to join Hungerford Town.

On 14 January 2025, Watts joined fellow Southern League side, Gloucester City.

On 29 June 2026, Watts agreed to join National League North side, Merthyr Town on a one-year deal.

== Career statistics ==
As of match played 18 April 2026

Appearances and goals by club, season and competition
Club	Season	League			FA Cup		League Cup		Other		Total	
Club	Season	Division	Apps	Goals	Apps	Goals	Apps	Goals	Apps	Goals	Apps	Goals
Newport County	2019–20	League Two	0	0	0	0	0	0	2 (Note: Appearance(s) in EFL Trophy)	0	2	0
Bristol Manor Farm (loan)	2019–20	Southern League Division One South	6	0	—		—		0	0	6	0
Aldershot Town	2020–21	National League	0	0	0	0	—		0	0	0	0
Aldershot Town	2021–22	National League	6	0	0	0	—		—		6	0
Aldershot Town	Total		6	0	0	0	—		0	0	6	0
Metropolitan Police (loan)	2020–21	Southern League Premier Division South	0	0	—		—		0	0	0	0
Farnborough (loan)	2021–22	Southern League Premier Division South	9	3	—		—		1 (Note: Appearance(s) in FA Trophy)	0	10	3
Hayes & Yeading United (loan)	2021–22	Southern League Premier Division South	13	1	—		—		—		13	1
Weston-super-Mare (loan)	2021–22	Southern League Premier Division South	8	1	—		—		1 (Note: Appearance(s) in Southern League Premier Division South play-offs)	0	9	1
Weston-super-Mare	2022–23	Southern League Premier Division South	31	3	3	0	—		2	1	36	4
Hungerford Town	2023–24	Southern League Premier Division South	40	14	2	2	—		4	2	46	18
Hungerford Town	2024–25	Southern League Premier Division South	15	8	3	0	—		1	0	19	8
Hungerford Town	Total		55	22	5	2	—		5	2	65	26
Gloucester City	2024–25	Southern League Premier Division South	18	7	—		—		2	0	20	7
Gloucester City	2025–26	Southern League Premier Division South	37	10	3	1	—		4	1	44	12
Gloucester City	Total		55	17	3	1	—		6	1	64	19
Merthyr Town	2026–27	National League North	0	0	0	0	—		0	0	0	0
Career Total			183	47	11	3	0	0	17	4	211	54
