= Taylor Maloney =

English footballer

Personal information
- Full name: Taylor Peter Maloney
- Date of birth: 21 January 1999 (age 27)
- Place of birth: Gravesend, England
- Position: Midfielder

Team information
- Current team: Tonbridge Angels
- Number: 8

Youth career
- 2012–2017: Charlton Athletic

Senior career*
Years	Team	Apps	(Gls)
2017–2020	Charlton Athletic	2	(0)
2019	→ Concord Rangers (loan)	9	(0)
2019–2020	→ Newport County (loan)	10	(3)
2020	→ Concord Rangers (loan)	5	(0)
2020–2021	Bromley	17	(0)
2021–2022	Lewes	32	(10)
2022–2023	Welling United	34	(10)
2023–2024	Farnborough	21	(3)
2024	Dartford	13	(0)
2024–	Tonbridge Angels	34	(2)
- * Club domestic league appearances and goals as of 17:10, 24 April 2025 (UTC)

Taylor Peter Maloney (born 21 January 1999) is an English professional footballer who plays as a midfielder for National League South club Tonbridge Angels.

== Career ==
Maloney was born in Gravesend, Kent and raised in nearby Wilmington. He started his career with Charlton Athletic, joining the club at under-14 level. He started a two-year scholarship with the club in the summer of 2015 and went on to captain the side whilst being a second-year scholar. In May 2017, he signed his first professional contract after completing his scholarship. He made his professional debut for the side in an EFL Trophy group stage victory over Crawley Town in August 2017, replacing Andrew Crofts as a substitute.

On 9 March 2019, Maloney joined National League South side Concord Rangers on loan until 6 April 2019.

On 1 August 2019, Maloney joined Newport County on loan for the 2019–20 season. He made his debut for Newport on 13 August 2019 in the starting line up for the EFL Cup first round win against Gillingham. On 12 November 2019 he scored his first goals for Newport, a hat-trick in the 7-4 EFL Trophy win against Cheltenham Town. On 3 January 2020, Maloney was recalled from his loan by Charlton.

On 14 February 2020, Maloney rejoined Concord Rangers on loan.

On 2 July 2020, it was confirmed that Maloney had left Charlton after his contract expired.

On 5 October 2020, Maloney joined Bromley.

After spells with Lewes and Welling United, Maloney agreed to join Farnborough in July 2023.

On 19 January 2024, Maloney joined Dartford.

On 31 May 2024, Maloney joined Tonbridge Angels.

== Career statistics ==
As of match played 21 April 2025

Appearances and goals by club, season and competition
Club	Season	League			FA Cup		League Cup		Other		Total	
Club	Season	Division	Apps	Goals	Apps	Goals	Apps	Goals	Apps	Goals	Apps	Goals
Charlton Athletic	2017–18	League One	1	0	0	0	0	0	2 (Note: Two appearances in the EFL Trophy)	0	3	0
Charlton Athletic	2018–19	League One	1	0	2	0	1	0	3 (Note: Three appearances in the EFL Trophy)	0	7	0
Charlton Athletic	2019–20	Championship	0	0	0	0	0	0	—		0	0
Charlton Athletic	Charlton Athletic total		2	0	2	0	1	0	5	0	10	0
Concord Rangers (loan)	2018–19	National League South	9	0	—		—		—		9	0
Newport County (loan)	2019–20	League Two	10	0	0	0	2	0	4 (Note: Four appearances in the EFL Trophy)	3	16	3
Concord Rangers (loan)	2019–20	National League South	5	0	—		—		1 (Note: One appearance in the FA Trophy)	0	6	0
Bromley	2020–21	National League	17	0	1	0	—		0	0	18	0
Bromley	2021–22	National League	0	0	0	0	—		0	0	0	0
Bromley	Bromley total		17	0	1	0	0	0	0	0	18	0
Lewes	2021–22	Isthmian League Premier Division	32	10	1	0	—		2 (Note: One appearance in the FA Trophy) (Note: One appearance in the Sussex Senior Cup)	0	35	10
Welling United	2022–23	National League South	34	10	3	1	—		2 (Note: Two appearances in the FA Trophy)	0	39	11
Farnborough	2023–24	National League South	21	3	3	2	—		1 (Note: One appearance in the FA Trophy)	0	25	5
Dartford	2023–24	National League South	13	0	—		—		4 (Note: One appearance in the Kent Senior Cup) (Note: Three appearances in the London Senior Cup)	0	17	0
Tonbridge Angels	2024–25	National League South	34	2	2	0	—		1 (Note: One appearance in the FA Trophy)	0	37	2
Career total			177	25	12	3	3	0	20	3	212	31
