= Ryan Hillier =

Welsh association football player

Personal information
- Full name: Ryan David Lewis-Hillier
- Date of birth: 18 January 2003 (age 23)
- Place of birth: Newport, Wales
- Position: Forward

Team information
- Current team: Cinderford Town

Youth career
- Newport County

Senior career*
Years	Team	Apps	(Gls)
2019–2022	Newport County	0	(0)
2022	→ Cardiff Metropolitan University (loan)	11	(0)
2022–2023	Yate Town		
2023	Abergavenny Town	4	(1)
- Cinderford Town
- * Club domestic league appearances and goals as of 23:09, 11 May 2022 (UTC)

Ryan David Lewis-Hillier is a Welsh footballer who plays as a forward for Cinderford Town.

== Career ==
Hillier is a product of the Newport County academy. On 4 September 2019 Hillier made his debut for Newport in the 5–4 defeat to West Ham United under-21s in the EFL Trophy Southern Group E as a substitute for Tristan Abrahams in the 22nd minute. Hillier scored the 4th goal for Newport in the 42nd minute. In June 2021 he signed his first professional contract with Newport County.

On 27 January 2021 Hillier joined Cardiff Metropolitan University on loan for the remainder of the 2021-22 season. He was released by Newport at the end of the 2021-22 season.
