= Armando Shashoua =

English footballer

Personal information
- Full name: Armando Shashoua Sarmiento
- Date of birth: 31 October 2000 (age 26)
- Place of birth: London, England
- Height: 5 ft 10 in (1.78 m)
- Position: Midfielder

Youth career
- 2008–2020: Tottenham Hotspur

Senior career*
Years	Team	Apps	(Gls)
2020	Tottenham Hotspur	0	(0)
2020	→ Atlético Baleares (loan)	4	(0)
2020–2022	Atlético Baleares	43	(4)
2022–2023	Ibiza	10	(0)
2023	→ Córdoba (loan)	10	(0)
2023–2024	Atlético Baleares	26	(1)
Total		93	(5)
- * Club domestic league appearances and goals

Armando Shashoua Sarmiento (born 31 October 2000) is an English former professional footballer who played as a midfielder.

== Club career ==
Born in London, Shashoua joined Tottenham Hotspur's Academy at the age of seven. He attended Harrow School. On 26 January 2020, he moved to Spain and joined his brother at CD Atlético Baleares on loan until the end of the season.

Shashoua made his senior debut on 9 February 2020, coming on as a late substitute for Jordan Holsgrove in a 3–1 Segunda División B home win over Pontevedra CF. On 17 August, after four appearances, he moved to ATB on a permanent contract.

Shashoua scored his first senior goal on 25 November 2020, netting the equalizer in a 1–1 away draw against Real Madrid Castilla. In June 2022, he was close to a move to the latter side, but the move never materialized.

On 12 July 2022, Shashoua moved to Segunda División side UD Ibiza on a three-year deal. He made his professional debut on 14 August, starting in a 2–0 home loss against Granada CF.

On 25 January 2023, Shashoua joined Córdoba CF in the third level, on loan until the end of the season.

On 17 July 2023, Shashoua returned to Atlético Baleares, signing a one-year deal.

In February 2025, Shashoua joined the venture capital firm Nova based in San Francisco with people such as Benedict Wolff, Carlo Agostinelli, Koko Xu, and Henry Lien.

== Personal life ==
His older brother Samuel is also a footballer and a midfielder; both played together for Atlético Baleares in 2020.

== International career ==
Born in England, Shashoua is eligible to represent Venezuela, Egypt, Spain and the United States internationally through his parents.
