= Veron Parkes =

English footballer

Personal information
- Full name: Veron Brandon Parkes
- Date of birth: 28 September 2001 (age 25)
- Place of birth: London, England
- Height: 1.76 m (5 ft 9 in)
- Position: Forward

Youth career
- 2009–2018: Crystal Palace
- 2018–2020: West Ham United

Senior career*
Years	Team	Apps	(Gls)
2020–2021	Fortuna Sittard	0	(0)
2020–2021	→ Dordrecht (loan)	6	(0)
2021	AFC Varndeanians	2	(0)
2024	Phoenix Sports	2	(0)
2024	Holmesdale	6	(3)
2024–2025	Glacis United	10	(3)
2025	FCB Magpies	0	(0)
- * Club domestic league appearances and goals as of 22:14, 14 March 2025 (UTC)

Veron Parkes (born 28 September 2001) is an English professional footballer who plays as a forward.

== Career ==
Parkes joined West Ham United from Crystal Palace in January 2018. In August 2020, Parkes joined Eredivisie side Fortuna Sittard on a three-year deal. In October 2020, he joined Eerste Divisie side Dordrecht on a season-long loan deal. On 18 October 2020, Parkes made his professional league debut as a substitute in a 2–2 draw with Almere City. Parkes played twice for Southern Combination Premier Division side AFC Varndeanians after joining the club in November 2021.

After nearly three years out of the game, Parkes returned to playing in 2024 with brief spells at Phoenix Sports and Holmesdale, before moving to Gibraltar in the summer to join Glacis United. He made his debut on 17 August 2024, assisting two goals in a 4–0 win over Europa Point. After a season disrupted by injury in which he scored 3 goals in 11 games, Parkes was signed by FCB Magpies in July 2025, being named in their squad for their 2025–26 UEFA Conference League campaign.

== Career statistics ==
As of Match played, 17 July 2025

Appearances and goals by club, season and competition
Club	Season	League			Cup		Europe		Other		Total	
Club	Season	Division	Apps	Goals	Apps	Goals	Apps	Goals	Apps	Goals	Apps	Goals
West Ham United U21	2018–19	—	—		—		—		1 (Note: Appearances in the EFL Trophy)	0	1	0
West Ham United U21	2019–20	—	—		—		—		2	1	2	1
West Ham United U21	Total		—		—		—		3	1	3	1
Fortuna Sittard	2020–21	Eredivisie	0	0	0	0	—		—		0	0
Dordrecht (loan)	2020–21	Eerste Divisie	6	0	1	0	—		—		7	0
AFC Varndeanians	2021–22	Southern Combination Premier Division	2	0	0	0	—		—		2	0
Phoenix Sports	2023–24	Isthmian League Division One South East	2	0	0	0	—		—		2	0
Holmesdale	2023–24	Southern Counties East Premier	6	3	0	0	—		—		6	3
Glacis United	2024–25	Gibraltar Football League	10	3	1	0	—		—		11	3
FCB Magpies	2025–26	Gibraltar Football League	0	0	0	0	2 (Note: Appearances in the UEFA Conference League)	0	—		2	0
Career total			26	6	2	0	2	0	3	1	33	7
