= Corey Whitely =

English footballer (born 1991)

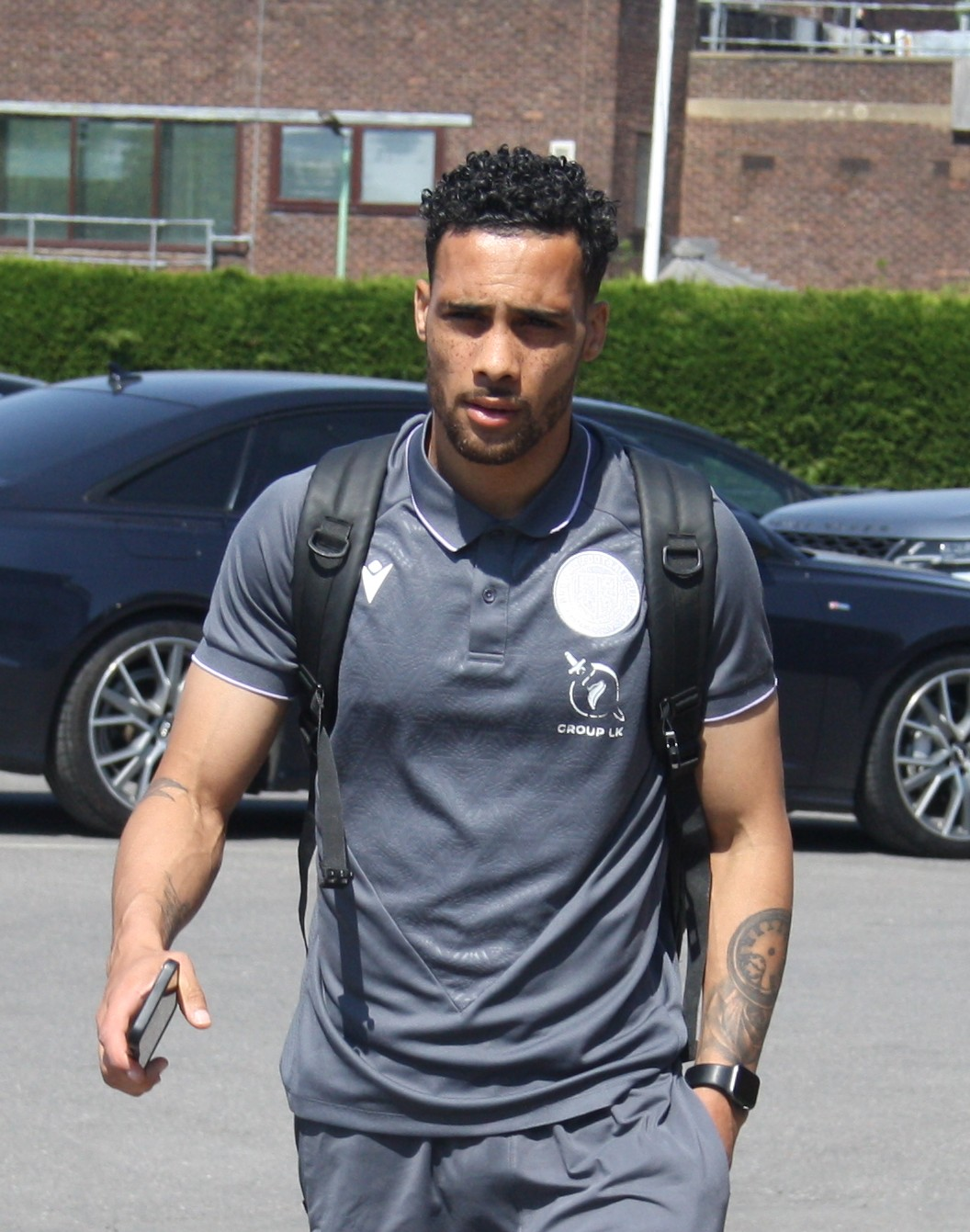
- Whitely in 2026

Personal information
- Full name: Corey Milton Whitely
- Date of birth: 11 July 1991 (age 35)
- Place of birth: Enfield Town, England
- Height: 5 ft 10 in (1.77 m)
- Position: Forward

Team information
- Current team: Bromley
- Number: 18

Youth career
- –2008: Boreham Wood

Senior career*
Years	Team	Apps	(Gls)
2008–2009	Boreham Wood	3	(0)
2009–2012	Yalova		
2012	Waltham Forest	15	(7)
2013	Cheshunt	22	(11)
2013–2016	Enfield Town	120	(46)
2016–2018	Dagenham & Redbridge	56	(23)
2018–2019	Ebbsfleet United	59	(11)
2019–2021	Newport County	10	(0)
2020	→ Bromley (loan)	8	(1)
2020–2021	→ Boreham Wood (loan)	35	(5)
2021–	Bromley	225	(23)
- * Club domestic league appearances and goals as of 11:23, 22 November 2026 (UTC)

Corey Milton Whitely (born 11 July 1991) is an English professional footballer who plays as a forward for EFL League One club Bromley.

== Career ==
Whitely began his senior career at Boreham Wood, where he played a handful of games in the 2008–09 season. After three seasons playing in the non-pyramid TTFF League for Yalova, in which he was top scorer, Whitely joined Isthmian League side Waltham Forest for the 2012–13 season. Whitely joined Cheshunt in January 2013, before moving up a division to join Enfield Town that summer. He scored 46 goals for Town over three seasons before moving up to the National League to join Dagenham & Redbridge in summer 2016. He won the Daggers' player of the season award the following summer before joining Ebbsfleet United in February 2018.

On 25 June 2019 Whitely joined Newport County on a two-year deal. He made his EFL League Two debut on the opening day of the 2019–20 season against Mansfield Town. On 4 September 2019 he scored his first goal for Newport in the 5–4 defeat to West Ham United Under-21s in the EFL Trophy Southern Group E. On 10 January 2020 Whitely joined Bromley on loan for the remainder of the 2019–20 season. On 20 August 2020 Whitely rejoined Boreham Wood on loan for the 2020–21 season. On 4 June 2021 it was announced that he would leave Newport County at the end of the season, following the expiry of his contract. Whitely joined Bromley permanently in July 2021. He signed a new contract with Bromley in October 2022.

His contract with Bromley was renewed for the 2026–27 season, after the club exercised a contract option.

== Career statistics ==
As of 1 July 2021

Appearances and goals by club, season and competition
Club	Season	League			FA Cup		League Cup		Other		Total	
Club	Season	Division	Apps	Goals	Apps	Goals	Apps	Goals	Apps	Goals	Apps	Goals
Waltham Forest	2012–13	Isthmian League Division One North	15	7	0	0	---		0	0	15	7
Enfield Town	2013–14	Isthmian League Premier Division	41	10	1	0	—		0	0	42	10
Enfield Town	2014–15	Isthmian League Premier Division	42	15	0	0	—		0	0	42	15
Enfield Town	2015–16	Isthmian League Premier Division	37	21	2	0	—		5 (Note: Two appearances and two goals in the FA Trophy, three appearances and one goal in the Alan Turvey Trophy.)	3	42	23
Enfield Town	Total		120	46	3	0	—		5	3	128	49
Dagenham & Redbridge	2016–17	National League	39	15	3	1	—		1 (Note: Appearance(s) in the FA Trophy.)	0	43	16
Dagenham & Redbridge	2017–18	National League	27	8	2	0	—		1	0	30	8
Dagenham & Redbridge	Total		56	23	5	1	—		2	0	63	24
Ebbsfleet United	2017–18	National League	15	3	0	0	—		0	0	15	3
Ebbsfleet United	2018–19	National League	44	8	3	0	—		1	0	48	8
Ebbsfleet United	Total		59	11	3	0	—		1	0	63	11
Newport County	2019–20	League Two	10	0	2	0	2	0	4 (Note: Appearance(s) in the EFL Trophy.)	1	18	1
Bromley (loan)	2019–20	National League	8	1	0	0	—		0	0	8	1
Boreham Wood (loan)	2020–21	National League	35	5	2	0	—		1	0	38	5
Bromley	2021–22	National League	0	0	0	0	—		0	0	0	0
Career total			328	104	15	1	2	0	13	4	358	109

== Honours ==
Bromley

- EFL League Two: 2025–26
- National League play-offs: 2024
- FA Trophy: 2021–22
