= Marvel Ekpiteta =

English footballer

Personal information
- Full name: Marvel Oghenetega Peter Edet Ekpiteta
- Date of birth: 26 August 1995 (age 31)
- Place of birth: London, England
- Position: Defender

Team information
- Current team: Aveley

Youth career
- Oxford United
- Stevenage

Senior career*
Years	Team	Apps	(Gls)
2014	North Greenford United	23	(2)
2015	AFC Hayes	11	(0)
2015–2016	Chelmsford City	24	(1)
2015–2016	→ Heybridge Swifts (loan)		
2016	Heybridge Swifts		
2016	Bishop's Stortford	8	(0)
2016–2017	East Thurrock United	6	(0)
2017–2018	Bishop's Stortford	36	(3)
2018	Wealdstone	0	(0)
2018–2019	Hungerford Town	36	(3)
2019–2020	Newport County	0	(0)
2019–2020	→ Ebbsfleet United (loan)	20	(2)
2020	→ Ebbsfleet United (loan)	0	(0)
2020	Macclesfield Town	0	(0)
2020–2021	Dover Athletic	10	(0)
2021–2023	Billericay Town	33	(0)
2023	Dulwich Hamlet	3	(0)
2023–2024	Hayes & Yeading United	24	(2)
2024–2025	Folkestone Invicta	26	(1)
2025–	Aveley	0	(0)
- * Club domestic league appearances and goals as of 19:47, 22 May 2025 (UTC)

Marvel Oghenetega Peter Edet Ekpiteta (born 26 August 1995) is an English footballer who plays as a defender for Isthmian League Premier Division club Aveley.

== Club career ==
=== Non-League football ===
Ekpiteta began his career in the youth academies of Oxford United and Stevenage. In 2014, Ekpiteta began his senior career at North Greenford United, playing for the club over the course of two seasons. In 2015, Ekpiteta signed for AFC Hayes, making 11 league appearances for the club. For the 2015–16 season, Ekpiteta signed for National League South club Chelmsford City. In December 2015, Ekpiteta signed dual-registration forms with Heybridge Swifts, playing for the club over the winter period, before returning to Chelmsford, finishing on 24 appearances for the season for the club. In 2016, Ekpiteta joined Bishop's Stortford, making ten appearances in all competitions, before signing for East Thurrock United. In 2017, Ekpiteta re-joined Bishop's Stortford, making 36 league appearances, scoring three times, in the 2017–18 season. In May 2018, Wealdstone signed Ekpiteta, however by the start of the 2018–19 season, Ekpiteta had signed for Hungerford Town, where he made 36 league appearances during the season. now signed for Macclesfield

=== Newport County ===
On 15 June 2019, Ekpiteta signed a two-year contract with League Two club Newport County. On 4 September 2019, he made his debut for Newport in the starting line up for the 5–4 defeat to West Ham United Under-23s in the EFL Trophy Southern Group E.

In an interview following the West Ham Under 21s game, Newport manager Michael Flynn stated Newport would not have signed both Ekpiteta and Lazar Stojsavljevic, now that defender Mickey Demetriou had in fact re-signed with the side. At the time, Demetriou had been expected to depart, and the two signings were made as cover. Stojsavljevic departed the club after appearing only once, for 29 minutes.

On 12 October 2019 Ekpiteta joined Ebbsfleet United on loan until 2 January 2020. Ekpiteta scored his first goal for Ebbsfleet on 29 October 2019 in a 4–0 win at Chorley. It was announced on 30 December 2019 that Ekpiteta's loan would be extended until the end of the season. He scored his second goal for the club in a 1–1 draw with Sutton on 1 February 2020. In August 2020 Ekpiteta re-signed on loan to Ebbsfleet United until January 2021. However, on 8 September 2020 his loan at Ebbsfleet was terminated and his contract at Newport was cancelled by mutual consent so that Ekpiteta could sign for Macclesfield Town on a permanent deal until the end of the 2020–21 season. However, on the 16 September 2020 Macclesfield Town was wound-up in the High Court.

=== Dover Athletic ===
On 3 October 2020, Ekpiteta joined Dover Athletic, one of four new signings on the day of the season commencement, making his debut later that day in a 1–0 victory over Notts County. Following's Dover's decision to not play any more matches in the 2020–21 season, made in late January, and subsequent null and voiding of all results, on 5 May 2021 it was announced that Ekpiteta was out of contract and had left the club.

=== Billericay Town ===
It was announced on 4 July 2021 that Marvel had joined Billericay Town.

=== Dulwich Hamlet ===
It was announced on 2 September 2023 that Ekpiteta had joined Dulwich Hamlet.

=== Folkestone Invicta ===
In June 2024, Ekpiteta joined Isthmian League Premier Division side Folkestone Invicta. He departed the club upon the expiration of his contract at the end of the 2024–25 season.

=== Aveley ===
On 19 May 2025, Ekpiteta joined recently relegated Isthmian League Premier Division side Aveley.

== Personal life ==
Ekpiteta's brother, Marvin is also a professional footballer.
