= Callum Jones (footballer, born 2002) =

Welsh footballer

Personal information
- Full name: Callum Oliver Jones
- Date of birth: 30 August 2002 (age 24)
- Place of birth: Swansea, Wales
- Height: 6 ft 1 in (1.85 m)
- Position: Defender

Youth career
- Newport County

Senior career*
Years	Team	Apps	(Gls)
2019–2020	Newport County	0	(0)
2020	→ Slimbridge (loan)	1	(0)
- * Club domestic league appearances and goals as of 16:44, 22 June 2020 (UTC)

Callum Jones (born 30 August 2002) is a Welsh professional footballer who most recently played as a defender for League Two side Newport County.

== Playing career ==
Jones is a product of the Newport County academy. On 12 November 2019 Jones made his debut for Newport as a second-half substitute for Matt Dolan in the 7–4 win against Cheltenham Town in the EFL Trophy Southern Group E. In January 2020, Jones joined Slimbridge on loan until the end of the 2019–20 season. Jones was released by Newport County at the end of the 2019–20 season.
