= Tristan Abrahams =

English footballer (born 1998)

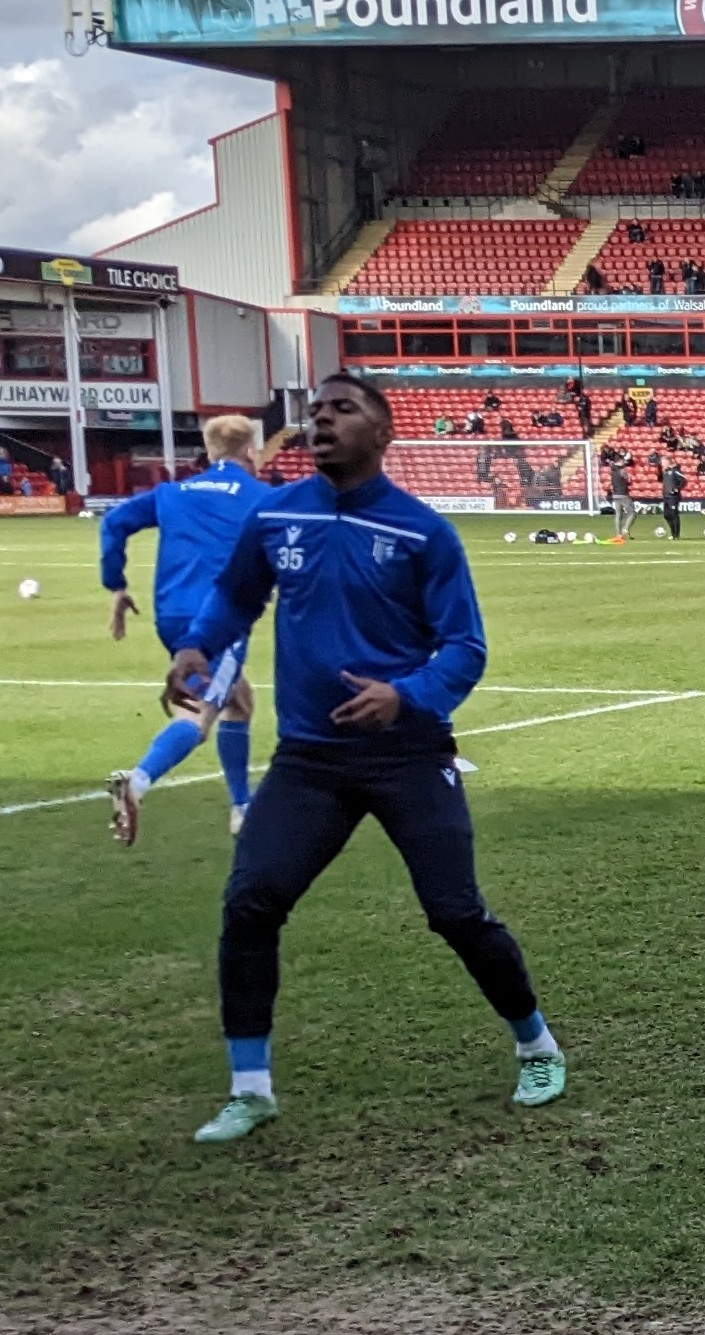
- Abrahams in 2023

Personal information
- Full name: Tristan Michael Alexander Abrahams
- Date of birth: 29 December 1998 (age 27)
- Place of birth: Lewisham, England
- Height: 6 ft 1 in (1.85 m)
- Position: Striker

Team information
- Current team: Aldershot Town
- Number: 7

Youth career
- –2016: Leyton Orient

Senior career*
Years	Team	Apps	(Gls)
2016–2017	Leyton Orient	10	(2)
2016–2017	→ Cambridge City (loan)	4	(0)
2017–2019	Norwich City	0	(0)
2017	→ Leyton Orient (loan)	0	(0)
2018–2019	→ Exeter City (loan)	15	(1)
2019	→ Yeovil Town (loan)	15	(3)
2019–2021	Newport County	56	(8)
2021	→ Leyton Orient (loan)	14	(0)
2021–2022	Carlisle United	20	(3)
2022	→ Grimsby Town (loan)	18	(4)
2022–2023	Eastleigh	27	(4)
2023	→ Gillingham (loan)	12	(0)
2023–2024	Welling United	18	(7)
2024–2025	Maidenhead United	52	(15)
2025–	Aldershot Town	20	(2)
2026	→ Chelmsford City (loan)	15	(2)
- * Club domestic league appearances and goals as of 19:30, 21 May 2026 (UTC)

Tristan Michael Alexander Abrahams (born 29 December 1998) is an English professional footballer who plays as a striker for National League side Aldershot Town.

He has previously played for Leyton Orient, Cambridge City, Norwich City, Exeter City, Yeovil Town, Newport County, Carlisle United, Grimsby Town, Eastleigh, Gillingham, Welling United and Maidenhead United.

== Career ==
=== Leyton Orient ===
After signing his first professional contract in November 2016, Abrahams went on loan to Cambridge City, making his debut in the 0–0 draw against St Ives Town on 26 December, and returning to Orient in January 2017.

He made his Football League debut as a second-half substitute for Josh Koroma in Orient's 4–0 win at Newport County on 4 March 2017.

Abrahams scored his first senior goal in Orient's 2–2 draw at Luton Town at Kenilworth Road on 14 April 2017. He started the following game on 17 April and scored the winning goal as Orient beat Hartlepool United 2–1.

=== Norwich City ===
On 31 July 2017, Abrahams made the switch to Norwich City for an undisclosed fee.

Abrahams rejoined Orient on loan for the 2017–18 National League season. The loan spell was terminated on 1 September 2017 without any appearances made.

In July 2018, Abrahams joined League Two side Exeter City on loan until the end of the 2018–19 season.

On 31 January 2019, Abrahams was recalled from his loan at Exeter City and instead joined Yeovil Town on loan until the end of the season replacing his injured Norwich team-mate Diallang Jaiyesimi.

=== Newport County ===
On 25 July 2019, following his release from Norwich City, Abrahams signed for League Two side Newport County on a two-year contract. On 3 August 2019, he made his debut for Newport in a 2–2 draw against Mansfield Town as a second-half substitute He scored his first goal for Newport on 13 August 2019 in the EFL Cup first round win against Gillingham. On 12 November 2019 he scored a hat-trick for Newport in the 7–4 EFL Trophy win against Cheltenham Town. In July 2020 Abrahams was selected as Newport County's Young Player of the Year for the 2019–20 season. On 5 September 2020 Abrahams scored both goals in Newport's 2–0 EFL Cup first round win against Championship club Swansea City. On 22 September 2020 Abrahams scored the first goal, a penalty, in Newport's 3–1 EFL Cup second round win against Championship club Watford. On 30 September 2020 Abrahams scored Newport's goal in the 1–1 EFL Cup third round match against Premier League club Newcastle United, with Newcastle eventually winning on penalties. On 1 February 2021 Abrahams rejoined Leyton Orient on loan for the remainder of the 2020–21 season.

=== Carlisle United ===
In June 2021, at the end of his Newport contract, Abrahams joined Carlisle United on a two-year deal.

On 20 January 2022, Abrahams signed for Grimsby Town on loan for the remainder of the 2021–22 season.

Abrahams came off the bench as Grimsby won promotion back to the Football League, with a 2–1 win in the 2022 National League play-off final over Solihull Moors at the London Stadium.

=== Eastleigh ===
On 5 July 2022, Abrahams signed for Eastleigh on a free transfer.

On 31 January 2023, Abrahams joined EFL League Two club Gillingham on loan for the remainder of the season.

=== Welling United ===
On 16 September 2023, Abrahams signed for National League South side Welling United on a deal to run until January 2024.

=== Maidenhead United ===
On 24 February 2024, Abrahams joined Maidenhead United. After 17 goals in 58 appearances, Abrahams left the Magpies at the end of the 2024-25 season.

=== Aldershot Town ===
On 10 June 2025, Abrahams returned to the National League following Maidenhead's relegation, joining Aldershot Town.

On 27 February 2026, Abraham joined Chelmsford City on loan.

== Career statistics ==
As of end of 2024-2025 season

Appearances and goals by club, season and competition
Club	Season	League			FA Cup		League Cup		Other		Total	
Club	Season	Division	Apps	Goals	Apps	Goals	Apps	Goals	Apps	Goals	Apps	Goals
Leyton Orient	2016–17	League Two	9	2	0	0	0	0	0	0	9	2
Cambridge City (loan)	2016–17	SFL Premier Division	4	0	0	0	—		0	0	4	0
Norwich City	2017–18	Championship	0	0	0	0	0	0	—		0	0
Norwich City	2018–19	Championship	0	0	0	0	0	0	—		0	0
Norwich City	Total		0	0	0	0	0	0	—		0	0
Leyton Orient (loan)	2017–18	National League	0	0	—		—		—		0	0
Exeter City (loan)	2018–19	League Two	16	1	1	1	2	0	4 (Note: Appearance(s) in EFL Trophy)	0	23	2
Yeovil Town (loan)	2018–19	League Two	15	3	—		—		—		15	3
Newport County	2019–20	League Two	33	4	4	0	2	1	7	5	46	10
Newport County	2020–21	League Two	23	4	1	0	4	4	0	0	28	8
Newport County	Total		56	8	5	0	6	5	7	5	74	18
Leyton Orient (loan)	2020–21	League Two	14	0	—		—		0	0	14	0
Carlisle United	2021–22	League Two	20	3	2	0	1	0	4 (Note: Appearances in EFL Trophy (1 goal))	1	27	4
Grimsby Town (loan)	2021–22	National League	18	4	—		—		3 (Note: Appearances in National League play-offs)	0	21	4
Eastleigh	2022–23	National League	27	4	2	1	—		2 (Note: Appearance(s) in FA Trophy)	0	31	5
Gillingham (loan)	2022–23	League Two	12	0	—		—		0	0	12	0
Welling United	2023–24	National League South	18	7	4	3	—		2	2	24	12
Maidenhead United	2023–24	National League	11	4 (Note: The goal scored on 29 March 2024, originally attributed to Remy Clerima and still listed as such by some sources, was actually scored by Abrahams.)	0	0	—		0	0	11	4
Maidenhead United	2024–25	National League	41	11	2	0	—		4 (Note: Two appearances and two goals in National League Cup, one appearance in FA Trophy, one appearance in Berks & Bucks Senior Cup)	2	47	13
Maidenhead United	Total		52	15	2	0	0	0	4	2	58	17
Career total			261	47	16	5	9	5	26	10	312	67

== Honours ==
Grimsby Town

- National League play-offs: 2022

Individual

- Newport County Young Player of the Year: 2019–20
