= 2021–22 Newport County A.F.C. season =

Welsh association football club season

Newport County
2021–22 season
- Owner: Newport County AFC Supporters Trust
- Chairman: Gavin Foxall
- Manager: Michael Flynn (until 1 October 2021); Wayne Hatswell (caretaker manager from 1 October 2021 to 19 October 2021); James Rowberry (from 19 October 2021)
- Stadium: Rodney Parade
- League Two: 11th
- FA Cup: First round
- EFL Cup: Second round
- EFL Trophy: Group stage
- Welsh League Cup: First round
- Top goalscorer: League: Dom Telford (25); All: Dom Telford (26)
- Highest home attendance: 7,002 v Southampton (25 August 2021), EFL Cup round 2
- Lowest home attendance: 1,032 v Plymouth Argyle (31 August 2021), EFL Trophy Southern Group F
- Average home league attendance: 4,333
Home colours	Away colours	Third colours

The 2021–22 Newport County A.F.C. season was the club's ninth consecutive season in the EFL League Two. It was Newport's 69th season in the Football League and 101st season of league football overall. Alongside League Two, they also competed in the FA Cup, the EFL Cup, the EFL Trophy and the Welsh League Cup. On 25 August 2021 Newport County faced Southampton of the Premier League in the second round of the 2021–22 EFL Cup but they lost heavily 8–0. Newport finished the 2021–22 League Two season in 11th place.

== Managerial changes ==
On 1 October 2021, manager Michael Flynn resigned after nine league matches of the 2021–22 season with Newport 15th in League Two. Newport County's Assistant Manager Wayne Hatswell was appointed as caretaker manager for five games. On 19 October 2021 it was confirmed that the club had appointed Cardiff City First Team Coach James Rowberry as permanent manager with Newport 13th in League Two after 13 league games. Hatswell was retained as assistant manager to Rowberry and Hatswell signed a contract extension in November 2021 until the end of the 2023–24 season. In February 2022 Hatswell resigned his position at Newport and on 22 February 2022 Hatswell was appointed assistant head coach to Michael Flynn at Walsall. On the same day, Cardiff City coach Carl Serrant was appointed assistant manager to Rowberry at Newport County.

== Pre-season friendlies ==
The Exiles confirmed they would have friendly matches against Undy, Blackpool, Chippenham Town, Cinderford Town and Cardiff City as part of their pre-season preparations.

9 July 2021 Friendly	Undy	1–5	Newport County	Undy
TBC BST (UTC+1)	Goal	Report	Trialist; Trialist; Livermore; Hillier	Stadium: The Causeway

17 July 2021 Friendly	Newport County	0–4	Swansea City	Lliswerry
BST (UTC+1)		Report		Stadium: Newport International Sports Village; Attendance: 0 (Behind-closed-doors)

20 July 2021 Friendly	Chippenham Town	1–2	Newport County	Chippenham
19:00 BST (UTC+1)	Griffiths 57' (pen.)	Report	Trialist 20'; Trialist 65'	Stadium: Hardenhuish Park

27 July 2021 Friendly	Cinderford Town	1–6	Newport County	Cinderford
19:30 BST (UTC+1)	Trialist (?)	Report	Clarke (?); Amond (?); Farquharson (?); Trialist (?); Trialist (?); Trialist (?)	Stadium: Causeway Ground

31 July 2021 Friendly	Cardiff City	2–0	Newport County	Cardiff
13:00 BST (UTC+1)	Ralls 21'; Harris 82'	Report		Stadium: Cardiff City Stadium

== Competitions ==
=== League Two ===
==== League table ====
Pos	Team	Pld	W	D	L	GF	GA	GD	Pts
8	Sutton United	46	22	10	14	69	53	+16	76
9	Tranmere Rovers	46	21	12	13	53	40	+13	75
10	Salford City	46	19	13	14	60	46	+14	70
11	Newport County	46	19	12	15	67	58	+9	69
12	Crawley Town	46	17	10	19	56	66	−10	61
13	Leyton Orient	46	14	16	16	62	47	+15	58
14	Bradford City	46	14	16	16	53	55	−2	58

Source: EFL Official Website
Rules for classification: 1) Points; 2) Goal difference; 3) Number of goals scored; 4) Head-to-head results; 5) Wins; 6) Away goals; 7) Penalty points (sec 9.5); 8) 12-point sending off offences

==== Results summary ====
Overall								Home						Away					
Pld	W	D	L	GF	GA	GD	Pts	W	D	L	GF	GA	GD	W	D	L	GF	GA	GD
46	19	12	15	67	58	+9	69	9	6	8	40	31	+9	10	6	7	27	27	0

Last updated: 7 May 2022.

==== Results by matchday ====
Matchday	1	2	3	4	5	6	7	8	9	10	11	12	13	14	15	16	17	18	19	20	21	22	23	24	25	26	27	28	29	30	31	32	33	34	35	36	37	38	39	40	41	42	43	44	45	46
Ground	A	A	A	A	H	A	H	H	A	H	H	A	H	A	H	A	H	A	A	H	H	A	A	H	H	A	A	H	A	A	H	H	H	H	H	A	A	H	A	H	A	H	A	H	A	H
Result	W	L	W	L	D	D	L	W	L	W	D	D	D	W	W	W	L	D	D	W	W	L	D	L	W	W	W	W	L	L	D	D	W	D	W	W	W	L	D	L	W	L	L	L	W	L
Position	6	13	8	15	15	14	19	12	14	12	13	14	13	12	8	5	8	9	9	8	4	6	7	7	6	5	3	3	5	7	7	8	8	6	4	3	3	3	5	8	7	8	10	10	11	11

Updated to match(es) played on 7 May 2022. Source: Statto.com
A = Away; H = Home; W = Win; D = Draw; L = Loss

==== Matches ====
Newport County's fixtures were released on 24 June 2021. On 7 July, the fixture dates against Mansfield Town were reversed due to pitch renovation work at Newport's Rodney Parade ground during August 2021.

7 August 2021 1	Oldham Athletic	0–1	Newport County	Oldham
15:00 BST (UTC+1)		Report	Ellison 88'	Stadium: Boundary Park; Attendance: 4,094; Referee: Tom Nield

14 August 2021 2	Mansfield Town	2–1	Newport County	Mansfield
15:00 BST (UTC+1)	Maris 7'; Clarke 43'	Report	Willmott 9'	Stadium: Field Mill; Attendance: 3,793; Referee: Anthony Backhouse

21 August 2021 3	Tranmere Rovers	0–1	Newport County	Birkenhead
15:00 BST (UTC+1)		Report	Fisher 60'	Stadium: Prenton Park; Attendance: 6,160; Referee: Robert Lewis

28 August 2021 4	Salford City	3–0	Newport County	Salford
15:00 BST (UTC+1)	Wright 1'; McAleny 18'; Henderson 30'	Report		Stadium: Moor Lane; Attendance: 1,687; Referee: Ben Speedie

4 September 2021 5	Newport County	2–2	Leyton Orient	Newport
15:00 BST (UTC+1)	Dolan 45+2' (pen.); Telford 80'	Report	Smith 34', 53'	Stadium: Rodney Parade; Attendance: 3,845; Referee: Leigh Doughty

10 September 2021 6	Harrogate Town	2–2	Newport County	Harrogate
19:45 BST (UTC+1)	Muldoon 34'; Armstrong 43'	Report	Bennett 3'; Willmott 38'	Stadium: Wetherby Road; Attendance: 1,883; Referee: Sam Allison

14 September 2021 7	Newport County	0–1	Northampton Town	Newport
19:45 BST (UTC+1)		Report	Guthrie 43'	Stadium: Rodney Parade; Attendance: 3,168; Referee: Craig Hicks

18 September 2021 8	Newport County	2–1	Walsall	Newport
15:00 BST (UTC+1)	Demetriou 9'; Clarke 87'	Report	Shade 45+2'	Stadium: Rodney Parade; Attendance: 3,825; Referee: Lee Swabey

24 September 2021 9	Barrow	2–1	Newport County	Barrow-in-Furness
19:45 BST (UTC+1)	Kay 63'; Gordon 78'	Report	Azaz 10'	Stadium: Holker Street; Attendance: 2,427; Referee: Bobby Madley

2 October 2021 10	Newport County	3–0	Scunthorpe United	Newport
15:00 BST (UTC+1)	Cooper 6'; Baker-Richardson 69'; Telford 84'	Report		Stadium: Rodney Parade; Attendance: 3,213; Referee: Steve Martin

9 October 2021 11	Newport County	0–0	Bradford City	Newport
15:00 BST (UTC+1)		Report		Stadium: Rodney Parade; Attendance: 4,089; Referee: Sam Purkiss

16 October 2021 12	Exeter City	2–2	Newport County	Exeter
15:00 BST (UTC+1)	Jay 22'; Nombe 55'	Report	Willmott 12'; Baker-Richardson 28'	Stadium: St James Park; Attendance: 5,078; Referee: Trevor Kettle

19 October 2021 13	Newport County	2–2	Carlisle United	Newport
19:45 BST (UTC+1)	Telford 27', 30'	Report	Riley 1'; Clough 67' (pen.)	Stadium: Rodney Parade; Attendance: 2,962; Referee: David Rock

23 October 2021 14	Bristol Rovers	1–3	Newport County	Bristol
15:00 BST (UTC+1)	Pitman 45+2'	Report	Baker-Richardson 27'; Telford 31', 61'	Stadium: Memorial Stadium; Attendance: 7,515; Referee: Scott Oldham

30 October 2021 15	Newport County	5–0	Stevenage	Newport
15:00 UTC	Telford 12', 28', 48'; Baker-Richardson 34'; Azaz 50'	Report		Stadium: Rodney Parade; Attendance: 3,439; Referee: Will Finnie

12 November 2021 16	Hartlepool United	1–2	Newport County	Hartlepool
19:45 UTC	Ferguson 63'	Report	Baker-Richardson 32'; Telford 90+3'	Stadium: Victoria Park; Attendance: 5,764; Referee: Sam Barrott

20 November 2021 17	Newport County	1–2	Swindon Town	Newport
15:00 UTC	Telford 74'	Report	Azaz 73' (o.g.); Payne 88'	Stadium: Rodney Parade; Attendance: 5,141; Referee: James Bell

23 November 2021 18	Crawley Town	1–1	Newport County	Crawley
19:45 UTC	Appiah 55'	Report	Telford 84'	Stadium: Broadfield Stadium; Attendance: 1,483; Referee: Sam Allison

26 November 2021 19	Colchester United	1–1	Newport County	Colchester
19:45 UTC	Sears 78'	Report	Telford 36'	Stadium: Colchester Community Stadium; Attendance: 2,401; Referee: Christopher Pollard

7 December 2021 20	Newport County	3–2	Sutton United	Newport
19:45 UTC	Collins 53'; Baker-Richardson 64'; Dolan 90+3' (pen.)	Report	Ajiboye 24', 42'	Stadium: Rodney Parade; Attendance: 3,368; Referee: Oliver Langford

11 December 2021 21	Newport County	2–1	Port Vale	Newport
15:00 UTC	Telford 69'; Azaz 75'	Report	Garrity 25'	Stadium: Rodney Parade; Attendance: 4,074; Referee: Paul Howard

18 December 2021 22	Rochdale	3–0	Newport County	Rochdale
15:00 UTC	Beesley 2', 72'; Kelly 89'	Report		Stadium: Spotland Stadium; Attendance: 2,232; Referee: Carl Boyeson

1 January 2022 23	Walsall	3–3	Newport County	Walsall
15:00 UTC	Wilkinson 53', 90+5'; Dolan 65' (o.g.)	Report	Telford 4', 66'; Wilkinson 56' (o.g.)	Stadium: Bescot Stadium; Attendance: 4,946; Referee: Rebecca Welch

8 January 2022 24	Newport County	0–2	Salford City	Newport
15:00 UTC		Report	Azaz 44' (o.g.); Thomas-Asante 52'	Stadium: Rodney Parade; Attendance: 0 (Welsh Government COVID-19 crowd restriction); Referee: Brett Huxtable

15 January 2022 25	Newport County	4–0	Harrogate Town	Newport
15:00 UTC	Demetriou 8' (pen.); Telford 43', 49'; Baker-Richardson 55'	Report		Stadium: Rodney Parade; Attendance: 0 (Welsh Government COVID-19 crowd restriction); Referee: Ollie Yates

22 January 2022 26	Scunthorpe United	0–1	Newport County	Scunthorpe
15:00 UTC		Report	Baker-Richardson 56'	Stadium: Glanford Park; Attendance: 2,604; Referee: Sam Purkiss

25 January 2022 27	Leyton Orient	0–1	Newport County	Leyton, London
19:45 UTC		Report	Norman 85'	Stadium: Brisbane Road; Attendance: 3,413; Referee: James Bell

29 January 2022 28	Newport County	2–1	Barrow	Newport
15:00 UTC	Telford 2', 12'	Report	Mickey Demetriou 63' (o.g.)	Stadium: Rodney Parade; Attendance: 4,080; Referee: Craig Hicks

5 February 2022 29	Forest Green Rovers	2–0	Newport County	Nailsworth
15:00 UTC	Stevens 33', 61'	Report		Stadium: The New Lawn; Attendance: 3,817; Referee: David Rock

8 February 2022 30	Northampton Town	1–0	Newport County	Northampton
19:45 UTC	Horsfall 82'	Report		Stadium: Sixfields Stadium; Attendance: 4,255; Referee: Ben Speedie

12 February 2022 31	Newport County	3–3	Oldham Athletic	Newport
15:00 UTC	Haynes 14'; Telford 40'; Demetriou 89'	Report	Keillor-Dunn 28'; Fondop 49', 82'	Stadium: Rodney Parade; Attendance: 3,901; Referee: Robert Lewis

19 February 2022 32	Newport County	1–1	Mansfield Town	Newport
15:00 UTC	Telford 82' (pen.)	Report	Pask 68' (o.g.)	Stadium: Rodney Parade; Attendance: 3,956; Referee: Will Finnie

26 February 2022 33	Newport County	4–2	Tranmere Rovers	Newport
15:00 UTC	Lewis 49'; Telford 57' (pen.); Azaz 87'; Telford 90+2'	Report	Dacres-Cogley 65'; Demetriou 84' (o.g.)	Stadium: Rodney Parade; Referee: Darren Drysdale

1 March 2022 34	Newport County	1–1	Forest Green Rovers	Newport
19:45 UTC	Azaz 3'	Report	Aitchison 55'	Stadium: Rodney Parade; Attendance: 4,448; Referee: Charles Breakspear

5 March 2022 35	Newport County	1–0	Bristol Rovers	Newport
15:00 UTC	Waite 33'	Report		Stadium: Rodney Parade; Attendance: 6,237; Referee: Darren Handley

12 March 2022 36	Stevenage	0–2	Newport County	Stevenage
15:00 UTC		Report	Street 48'; Haynes 71'	Stadium: Broadhall Way; Attendance: 2,733; Referee: Ben Toner

15 March 2022 37	Carlisle United	1–2	Newport County	Carlisle
19:45 UTC	Patrick 80'	Report	Demetriou 15'; Azaz 65'	Stadium: Brunton Park; Attendance: 4,445; Referee: Martin Coy

18 March 2022 38	Newport County	2–3	Hartlepool United	Newport
19:45 UTC	Bogle 16' (o.g.); Street 71'	Report	Sterry 35'; Molyneux 45+3'; Byrne 73'	Stadium: Rodney Parade; Attendance: 4,768; Referee: Alan Young

26 March 2022 39	Bradford City	0–0	Newport County	Bradford
15:00 UTC		Report		Stadium: Valley Parade; Attendance: 14,716; Referee: Marc Edwards

2 April 2022 40	Newport County	0–1	Exeter City	Newport
15:00 BST (UTC+1)		Report	Dieng 72'	Stadium: Rodney Parade; Attendance: 5,697; Referee: Chris Sarginson

9 April 2022 41	Swindon Town	0–1	Newport County	Swindon
15:00 BST (UTC+1)		Report	Conroy 90' (o.g.)	Stadium: County Ground; Attendance: 11,408; Referee: Neil Hair

15 April 2022 42	Newport County	1–2	Crawley Town	Newport
15:00 BST (UTC+1)	Waite 59'	Report	Nadesan 15'; Francillette 21'	Stadium: Rodney Parade; Attendance: 5,137; Referee: Simon Mather

18 April 2022 43	Sutton United	1–0	Newport County	Sutton, London
15:00 BST (UTC+1)	Milsom 45' (pen.)	Report		Stadium: Gander Green Lane; Attendance: 3,447; Referee: Ollie Yates

22 April 2022 44	Newport County	1–2	Colchester United	Newport
19:45 BST (UTC+1)	Telford 40'	Report	Akinde 68'; Chilvers 77'	Stadium: Rodney Parade; Attendance: 5,989; Referee: Tom Reeves

2 May 2022 45	Port Vale	1–2	Newport County	Stoke-on-Trent
15:00 BST (UTC+1)	Garrity 51'; Martin (yellow card) 86'	Report	Haynes 3'; Azaz 72'	Stadium: Vale Park; Attendance: 9,048; Referee: Carl Brook

7 May 2022 46	Newport County	0–2	Rochdale	Newport
15:00 BST (UTC+1)		Report	Done 16'; Odoh 90+2'	Stadium: Rodney Parade; Attendance: 5,322; Referee: Lee Swabey

=== FA Cup ===
6 November 2021 First round	Morecambe	1–0	Newport County	Morecambe
15:00 UTC	Wildig 68'	Report		Stadium: Mazuma Stadium; Attendance: 1,879; Referee: Chris Sarginson

=== EFL Cup ===
10 August 2021 First round	Ipswich Town	0–1	Newport County	Ipswich
19:45 BST (UTC+1)		Report	Abraham 4'	Stadium: Portman Road; Attendance: 6,144; Referee: Neil Hair

25 August 2021 Second round	Newport County	0–8	Southampton	Newport
19:45 BST (UTC+1)		Report	Broja 9', 57'; Tella 25'; Walker-Peters 44'; Elyounoussi 48', 55', 90+1'; Redmond 69'	Stadium: Rodney Parade; Attendance: 7,002; Referee: Darren Drysdale

=== EFL Trophy ===
Win Draw Loss Postponed

Newport County were drawn into Southern Group F. The dates for the group stage fixtures were confirmed on 3 August 2021.

Pos	Div	Team	Pld	W	PW	PL	L	GF	GA	GD	Pts	Qualification
1	L2	Swindon Town	3	3	0	0	0	6	2	+4	9	Advance to Round 2
2	ACA	Arsenal U21	3	1	0	1	1	6	6	0	4	Advance to Round 2
3	L2	Newport County	3	1	0	0	2	5	5	0	3	
4	L1	Plymouth Argyle	3	0	1	0	2	2	6	−4	2	

Source: EFL.com

31 August 2021 Group game 1	Newport County	2–0	Plymouth Argyle	Newport
19:00 BST (UTC+1)	Telford 58'; Abraham 84'	Report		Stadium: Rodney Parade; Attendance: 1,032; Referee: Tom Reeves

12 October 2021 Group game 2	Newport County	3–4	Arsenal U21	Newport
19:00 BST (UTC+1)	Greenidge 19'; Abraham 62'; Fisher 68'	Report	Giraud-Hutchinson 33'; Oulad M'Hand 53'; Olayinka 86'; Sagoe Jr. 90+2'	Stadium: Rodney Parade; Attendance: 1,426; Referee: Chris Sarginson

9 November 2021 Group game 3	Swindon Town	1–0	Newport County	Swindon
19:00 UTC	Mitchell-Lawson 57'	Report		Stadium: County Ground; Attendance: 2,125; Referee: James Oldham

=== Welsh League Cup ===
The draw for the Welsh League Cup sponsored by Nathaniel MG was made on 24 June 2021 with Newport County and Denbigh Town invited as wildcard entries.

17 July 2021 Southern Section First Round	Llanelli Town	5–0	Newport County	Llanelli
15:00 BST (UTC+1)	18'; 23'; 25' (?); Jones (?)	Report		Stadium: Stebonheath Park

== Transfers ==
=== Transfers in ===
Date	Position	Nationality	Name	From	Fee	Ref.
1 July 2021	CF	(England)	Courtney Baker-Richardson	(England) Barrow	Free transfer	
1 July 2021	CB	(England)	James Clarke	(England) Walsall	Free transfer	
1 July 2021	GK	(England)	Joe Day	(Wales) Cardiff City	Free transfer	
1 July 2021	LW	(England)	Jermaine Hylton	(Scotland) Ross County	Free transfer	
1 July 2021	RB	(England)	Cameron Norman	(England) Walsall	Free transfer	
1 July 2021	CM	(England)	Ed Upson	(England) Bristol Rovers	Free transfer	
2 July 2021	DM	(Republic of the Congo)	Christopher Missilou	(England) Swindon Town	Free transfer	
5 July 2021	FW	(Wales)	Tom Stokes	(Wales) Swansea City	Free transfer	
6 July 2021	RW	(England)	Courtney Senior	(England) Colchester United	Free transfer	
29 July 2021	LB	(England)	Louis Hall	(England) Oxford City	Free transfer	
4 August 2021	CF	(England)	Jordan Greenidge	Free agent	Free transfer	
14 August 2021	CF	(England)	Alex Fisher	(England) Exeter City	Free transfer	
12 January 2022	CM	(Wales)	James Waite	(Wales) Penybont	Free transfer	

=== Loans in ===
Date from	Position	Nationality	Name	From	Date until	Ref.
26 July 2021	CM	(England)	Finn Azaz	(England) Aston Villa	End of season	
28 July 2021	CF	(England)	Timmy Abraham	(England) Fulham	End of season	
31 August 2021	CM	(England)	Jake Cain	(England) Liverpool	End of season	
31 August 2021	AM	(Wales)	Ollie Cooper	(Wales) Swansea City	End of season	
11 January 2022	CB	(England)	Josh Pask	(England) Coventry City	End of season	
26 January 2022	CF	(England)	Rob Street	(England) Crystal Palace	End of season	

=== Loans out ===
Date from	Position	Nationality	Name	To	Date until	Ref.
10 August 2021	CF	(Republic of Ireland)	Pádraig Amond	(England) Exeter City	End of season	
10 January 2022	LM	(Wales)	Lewys Twamley	(England) Salisbury	End of season	
14 January 2022	CB	(Wales)	Joe Woodiwiss	(Wales) Merthyr Town	End of season	
25 January 2022	LB	(England)	Louis Hall	(England) Gloucester City	End of season	
27 January 2022	FW	(Wales)	Ryan Hillier	(Wales) Cardiff Metropolitan University	End of season	

=== Transfers out ===
Date	Position	Nationality	Name	To	Fee	Ref.
13 December 2021	DM	(Republic of the Congo)	Christopher Missilou	Free agent	Released	
4 January 2022	CM	(England)	Ed Upson	(England) Stevenage	Released	
6 January 2022	CF	(England)	Jordan Greenidge	(England) Weymouth	Released	
9 January 2022	LW	(England)	Jermaine Hylton	Free agent	Released	
30 June 2022	CF	(Republic of Ireland)	Pádraig Amond	(England) Woking	Free transfer	
30 June 2022	CF	(England)	Courtney Baker-Richardson	(England) Crewe Alexandra	Free transfer	
30 June 2022	MF	(Wales)	Charlie Bullock	Free agent	Released	
30 June 2022	LW	(England)	Kevin Ellison	Free agent	Released	
30 June 2022	DF	(Wales)	Iestyn Evans	Free agent	Released	
30 June 2022	CF	(England)	Alex Fisher	(England) Yeovil Town	Free transfer	
30 June 2022	LB	(England)	Louis Hall	Free agent	Released	
30 June 2022	LB	(England)	Ryan Haynes	(England) Northampton Town	Free transfer	
30 June 2022	CF	(Wales)	Ryan Hillier	Free agent	Released	
30 June 2022	CB	(Wales)	Dixon Kabongo	Free agent	Released	
30 June 2022	CM	(Wales)	Aneurin Livermore	Free agent	Released	
30 June 2022	RM	(Wales)	Zack Maher	(Wales) Merthyr Town	Free transfer	
30 June 2022	DF	(Wales)	Ethan Morgan	Free agent	Released	
30 June 2022	MF	(Wales)	Kian Pritchard	Free agent	Released	
30 June 2022	MF	(Wales)	Callum Ryan-Phillips	Free agent	Released	
30 June 2022	RW	(England)	Courtney Senior	Free agent	Released	
30 June 2022	CF	(England)	Dom Telford	(England) Crawley Town	Free transfer	
