= Kyle Howkins =

English footballer (born 1996)

Personal information
- Full name: Kyle Elliot Howkins
- Date of birth: 4 May 1996 (age 30)
- Place of birth: Walsall, England
- Height: 6 ft 5 in (1.95 m)
- Position: Centre-back

Team information
- Current team: Hereford
- Number: 28

Youth career
- 2012–2014: West Bromwich Albion

Senior career*
Years	Team	Apps	(Gls)
2015–2019	West Bromwich Albion	0	(0)
2015–2016	→ Kidderminster Harriers (loan)	8	(1)
2016–2017	→ Mansfield Town (loan)	16	(0)
2017–2018	→ Cambridge United (loan)	2	(0)
2018	→ Port Vale (loan)	10	(1)
2019	→ Port Vale (loan)	3	(0)
2019–2021	Newport County	18	(1)
2021	→ Solihull Moors (loan)	7	(0)
2023–	Hereford	125	(3)
- * Club domestic league appearances and goals as of 20:16, 21 November 2026 (UTC)

Kyle Elliot Howkins (born 4 May 1996) is an English footballer who plays as a centre-back for National League North club Hereford.

Howkins began his career at West Bromwich Albion and enjoyed loan spells at Kidderminster Harriers, Mansfield Town, Cambridge United and Port Vale, before he joined Newport County on a permanent deal in June 2019. He joined Solihull Moors on loan in January 2021. He signed with Hereford in July 2023, following a two-year absence from the game as he recovered from an ACL injury.

== Career ==
=== West Bromwich Albion ===
Howkins began his career with West Bromwich Albion. He joined the club at the age of 11 before progressing through the academy. He signed scholarship forms, which eventually progressed through a third year. In January 2017, Howkins signed a professional contract to keep him at The Hawthorns until 2019.

On 23 October 2015, Howkins joined National League side Kidderminster Harriers on a 28-day youth loan. He made his league debut for the "Carpetmen" six days later, in a 1–0 win over Woking at Aggborough. He managed to establish himself in the first-team alongside Kelvin Langmead, with Jordan Tunnicliffe out injured, and was described by managerDave Hockaday as "a lot of a monster, never mind a bit of a monster ... he's a big daft, galloot! He's got great height, he's a great athlete, he's big, he's strong he's up for the fight". Coach Darren Moore said that "he's learning invaluable lessons of the game" playing in Kiddy's relegation fight. His loan spell was extended until January, and he scored his first goal in senior football in a 2–1 defeat to Cheltenham Town on Boxing Day. He went on to make a total of ten appearances before being recalled by his parent club on 4 January.

Howkins joined League Two side Mansfield Town on loan in July 2016. He made his debut in the English Football League in a 3–2 victory at Newport County in the opening game of the season on 6 August. However, he suffered a hamstring injury in an EFL Trophy Group Stage defeat to Doncaster Rovers on 30 August and was sidelined for a month. This led "Stags" boss Adam Murray to sign Alex Iacovitti on loan from Nottingham Forest to provide cover at centre-back. After returning to fitness he was sent off for a second bookable offence in a 4–0 loss at Portsmouth. After extending his loan spell at Field Mill until the end of the 2016–17 season, Howkins soon suffered an injury that kept him out for two months. He ended the campaign with a total of 20 appearances to his name. Speaking in February, manager Steve Evans said that Howkins had "been excellent in all honesty... he's got a lot to do to become a Premier League player but he's on the right track".

On 12 August 2017, Howkins signed a six-month loan deal with League Two team Cambridge United. A hamstring injury kept him of out action for a month, before he made his debut, coming on as a late second-half substitute, in a 2–1 defeat at former club Mansfield Town on 23 September. He made only one start for Shaun Derry's "U's", in a 1–0 defeat to Southampton U23s at the Abbey Stadium on 3 October.

On 31 January 2018, he returned to League Two on loan at Port Vale until the end of the 2017–18 season. He was one of three centre-backs signed by manager Neil Aspin within the space of 48 hours. He impressed for the "Valiants" and Aspin stated his intention to try to bring Howkins back to Vale Park for the following season. However, he missed the first half of the 2018–19 season with a knee injury, but said that upon returning to fitness "training with the likes of Gayle and Rodriguez has benefited me a lot". He did return on loan to Port Vale on 31 January 2019, ironically the day after Aspin resigned as manager. However, injury problems meant that he featured only three times under new manager John Askey and returned to West Brom on 30 April.

=== Newport County ===
On 11 June 2019, Howkins joined League Two club Newport County on a two-year contract; "Exiles" manager Michael Flynn said that "Kyle is someone I've kept my eye on for almost over 2 years and even tried signing him on loan in the past. It's a fantastic deal for us because he's got a promising future ahead of him". On 3 August, he made his debut for Newport in the opening game of the season, a 2–2 draw with Mansfield Town at Rodney Parade. He scored his first goal for the "Ironsides" on 17 August, in a 1–0 home win over Plymouth Argyle. On 29 November, he had a nasty clash of heads with Maldon & Tiptree striker Charlee Hughes and had a fit after falling to the ground; he suffered a fractured skull and was out of action for six weeks. The 2019–20 was ended early in March due to the COVID-19 pandemic in England.

Howkins played the opening four games of the 2020–21 campaign before he was sidelined with a hamstring injury and fell out of Michael Flynn's first-team plans, having fallen behind David Longe-King, Matthew Dolan, Mickey Demetriou, Ashley Baker, Scot Bennett and Joe Woodiwiss in the pecking order. On 21 January 2021, Howkins joined National League side Solihull Moors – managed by former West Brom coach James Shan – on loan for the remainder of the 2020–21 season. On 4 June 2021 it was announced that he would leave Newport County at the end of the season, following the expiry of his contract.

=== Hereford ===
After spending just over two years out recovering from an ACL injury, on 7 July 2023, Howkins returned to football at a semi-professional level by signing for National League North club Hereford. He had trained with the club for three weeks before signing and featured in their first pre-season friendly. He made his debut at Edgar Street in the opening league fixture of the 2023–24 season and went on to play 37 games in all competitions. He signed a contract extension in May 2024 to keep him at Hereford until the end of the 2024–25 season.

Howkins was named on the National League North Team of the Week for his performance in a 1–0 win over Chorley on 14 December. He played 39 league games across the 2024–25 campaign. On 19 May 2025, it was announced he had signed a new deal for the 2025–26 season, becoming the first Hereford player to commit to the season ahead.

== Career statistics ==
As of match played 21 November 2026

Appearances and goals by club, season and competition
Club	Season	League			FA Cup		League Cup		Other		Total	
Club	Season	Division	Apps	Goals	Apps	Goals	Apps	Goals	Apps	Goals	Apps	Goals
West Bromwich Albion	2014–15	Premier League	0	0	0	0	0	0	—		0	0
West Bromwich Albion	2015–16	Premier League	0	0	0	0	0	0	—		0	0
West Bromwich Albion	2016–17	Premier League	0	0	0	0	0	0	—		0	0
West Bromwich Albion	2017–18	Premier League	0	0	0	0	0	0	—		0	0
West Bromwich Albion	2018–19	Championship	0	0	0	0	2	0	0	0	2	0
West Bromwich Albion	Total		0	0	0	0	2	0	0	0	2	0
West Bromwich Albion U21	2018–19	—			—		—		3 (Note: Appearance(s) in EFL Trophy)	0	3	0
Kidderminster Harriers (loan)	2015–16	National League	8	1	1	0	—		1 (Note: Appearance(s) in FA Trophy)	0	10	1
Mansfield Town (loan)	2016–17	League Two	16	0	0	0	1	0	3	0	20	0
Cambridge United (loan)	2017–18	League Two	2	0	0	0	0	0	1	0	3	0
Port Vale (loan)	2017–18	League Two	10	1	0	0	0	0	0	0	10	1
Port Vale (loan)	2018–19	League Two	3	0	0	0	0	0	0	0	3	0
Newport County	2019–20	League Two	16	1	0	0	2	0	4	0	22	1
Newport County	2020–21	League Two	2	0	0	0	2	0	0	0	4	0
Newport County	Total		18	1	0	0	4	0	4	0	26	1
Solihull Moors (loan)	2020–21	National League	7	0	0	0	0	0	0	0	7	0
Hereford	2023–24	National League North	29	1	4	0	—		4	0	37	1
Hereford	2024–25	National League North	39	0	3	0	—		1	0	43	0
Hereford	2025–26	National League North	41	1	3	0	—		2	0	46	1
Hereford	2026–27	National League North	16	1	1	0	—		1	0	18	1
Hereford	Total		125	3	11	0	—		8	0	144	3
Career total			189	7	12	0	7	0	20	0	228	7
