= 2020–21 Newport County A.F.C. season =

Welsh association football club season

Newport County
2020–21 season
- Owner: Newport County AFC Supporters Trust
- Chairman: Gavin Foxall
- Manager: Michael Flynn
- Stadium: Rodney Parade and Cardiff City Stadium 9 March 2021 to 21 March 2021
- League Two: 5th (play-off finalists)
- FA Cup: Third round
- EFL Cup: Fourth round
- EFL Trophy: Group stage
- Welsh League Cup: Enter in first round, competition cancelled
- Top goalscorer: League: Pádraig Amond; Matt Dolan; Scott Twine (6 each); All: Pádraig Amond (9)
Home colours	Away colours	Third colours

The 2020–21 Newport County A.F.C. season was the club's eight consecutive season in the EFL League Two. It was Newport's 68th season in the Football League and 100th season of league football overall. Due to the COVID-19 pandemic in the United Kingdom fans were not permitted to attend matches until the League 2 Playoff semi-finals and final.

On 22 September 2020 Newport County beat Championship club Watford 3–1 at home in the third round of the EFL Cup to reach the fourth round for the first time in the club's history. Newport were drawn at home to Premier League club Newcastle United in the fourth round and after drawing 1–1 in normal time Newcastle won the penalty shoot-out. Newport again reached the third round of the FA Cup to face Premier League club Brighton & Hove Albion at home on 10 January 2021. Newport lost to Brighton on penalties having drawn 1–1 after extra time. On 19 January 2021 goalkeeper Tom King scored the first goal of his career with a wind-assisted goal kick in the 12th minute of Newport's 1–1 League Two draw at Cheltenham Town. On 21 January 2021, his goal was confirmed to have broken the Guinness World Record for longest football goal, with a distance of 96.01 metres (105 yards), a record previously held by Asmir Begović. In March 2020 Newport were permitted by the EFL to move two home matches to Cardiff City Stadium due to the poor condition of the Rodney Parade pitch. Newport finished the 2020–21 season in 5th place in League Two and qualified for the play-offs. Newport beat Forest Green Rovers 5–4 on aggregate to reach the play-off final for the second time in three seasons. In the League Two playoff final at Wembley Stadium on 31 May 2021 Newport lost to Morecambe, 1–0 after a controversial 107th-minute penalty.

== Transfers ==
=== Transfers in ===
Date from	Position	Nationality	Name	From	Fee	Ref.
4 August 2020	CB	(England)	Scot Bennett	Free agent	Free transfer	
20 August 2020	CB	(England)	David Longe-King	(England) St Albans City	Free transfer	
20 August 2020	CF	(England)	Ryan Taylor	(England) Plymouth Argyle	Free transfer	
2 September 2020	RB	(Wales)	Liam Shephard	(England) Forest Green Rovers	Free transfer	
4 September 2020	LW	(England)	Kevin Ellison	(England) Morecambe	Free transfer	
8 January 2020	CM	(Wales)	Jack Evans	(Wales) Swansea City	Free transfer	
28 January 2021	CF	(England)	Dom Telford	(England) Plymouth Argyle	Undisclosed	
29 January 2021	CB	(England)	Priestley Farquharson	(Wales) Connah's Quay Nomads	Undisclosed	
18 March 2021	CM	(Wales)	Joe Ledley	(Australia) Newcastle Jets	Free transfer	

=== Loans in ===
Date from	Position	Nationality	Name	From	Date until	Ref.
28 August 2020	CF	(The Gambia)	Saikou Janneh	(England) Bristol City	2 January 2021	
3 September 2020	CF	(England)	Scott Twine	(England) Swindon Town	2 January 2021	
7 September 2020	CB	(Wales)	Brandon Cooper	(Wales) Swansea City	5 January 2021	
18 September 2020	CB	(England)	Bradley Webb	(England) Bristol City	2 January 2021	
16 October 2020	RB	(Wales)	Aaron Lewis	(England) Lincoln City	2 January 2021	
16 October 2020	AM	(Republic of Ireland)	Jamie Devitt	(England) Blackpool	17 January 2021	
16 October 2020	CF	(England)	Jamie Proctor	(England) Rotherham United	17 January 2021	
5 January 2021	CF	(England)	Owen Windsor	(England) West Bromwich Albion	1 February 2021	
8 January 2021	CF	(England)	Jake Scrimshaw	(England) AFC Bournemouth	End of season	
20 January 2021	AM	(Malta)	Luke Gambin	(England) Colchester United	End of season	
25 January 2021	CM	(England)	Anthony Hartigan	(England) AFC Wimbledon	End of season	
2 February 2021	CF	(England)	Nicky Maynard	(England) Mansfield Town	End of season	

=== Loans out ===
Date from	Position	Nationality	Name	To	Date until	Ref.
20 August 2020	FW	(England)	Corey Whitely	(England) Boreham Wood	End of season	
28 August 2020	CB	(England)	Marvel Ekpiteta	(England) Ebbsfleet United	8 September 2020 (Note: Loan deal cut short enabling a permanent transfer elsewhere.)	
4 September 2020	RB	(England)	Daniel Leadbitter	(England) Yeovil Town	18 January 2021	
21 January 2021	CB	(England)	Kyle Howkins	(England) Solihull Moors	End of season	
1 February 2021	CF	(England)	Tristan Abrahams	(England) Leyton Orient	End of season	
1 February 2021	RM	(England)	Robbie Willmott	(England) Exeter City	End of season	
2 February 2021	RB	(England)	Daniel Leadbitter	(England) Gloucester City	End of season	

=== Transfers out ===
Date from	Position	Nationality	Name	To	Fee	Ref.
8 September 2020	CB	(England)	Marvel Ekpiteta	(England) Macclesfield Town	Free	
14 September 2020	CF	(England)	Ade Azeez	(England) Dover Athletic	Released	
23 October 2020	MF	(Wales)	Evander Grubb	(England) Huddersfield Town	Undisclosed	
30 June 2021	CF	(England)	Tristan Abrahams	(England) Carlisle United	Free	
30 June 2021	RB	(Wales)	Ash Baker	(Wales) The New Saints	Released	
30 June 2021	CM	(Wales)	Jack Evans	(Wales) Penybont	Released	
30 June 2021	CB	(England)	Kyle Howkins	Free agent	Released	
30 June 2021	GK	(Wales)	Tom King	(England) Salford City	Released	
30 June 2021	CM	(England)	Joss Labadie	(England) Walsall	Free	
30 June 2021	RB	(England)	Daniel Leadbitter	(England) Gloucester City	Released	
30 June 2021	CM	(Wales)	Joe Ledley	Free agent	Released	
30 June 2021	CB	(England)	David Longe-King	(England) Grimsby Town	Released	
30 June 2021	CM	(Wales)	Josh Sheehan	(England) Bolton Wanderers	Free	
30 June 2021	RB	(Wales)	Liam Shephard	(England) Salford City	Free	
30 June 2021	CF	(England)	Ryan Taylor	(England) Grimsby Town	Released	
30 June 2021	SS	(England)	Corey Whitely	(England) Bromley	Released	

== Pre-season ==
Win Draw Loss Postponed

21 August 2020 Friendly	Newport County	1–1	Bristol Rovers	Newport
18:30 BST (UTC+1)	Abrahams		Hare	Stadium: Dragon Park

29 August 2020 Friendly	Hereford	0–4	Newport County	Hereford
13:00 BST (UTC+1)		Report	Collins 12' Taylor 49' Janneh 66' Trialist 3 76'	Stadium: Edgar Street

== Competitions ==
=== League Two ===
==== League table ====
Pos	Team	Pld	W	D	L	GF	GA	GD	Pts	Promotion, qualification or relegation
1	Cheltenham Town (C, P)	46	24	10	12	61	39	+22	82	Promotion to the EFL League One
2	Cambridge United (P)	46	24	8	14	73	49	+24	80	Promotion to the EFL League One
3	Bolton Wanderers (P)	46	23	10	13	59	50	+9	79	Promotion to the EFL League One
4	Morecambe (O, P)	46	23	9	14	69	58	+11	78	Qualification for League Two play-offs
5	Newport County	46	20	13	13	57	42	+15	73	Qualification for League Two play-offs
6	Forest Green Rovers	46	20	13	13	59	51	+8	73	Qualification for League Two play-offs
7	Tranmere Rovers	46	20	13	13	55	50	+5	73	Qualification for League Two play-offs
8	Salford City	46	19	14	13	54	34	+20	71	
9	Exeter City	46	18	16	12	71	50	+21	70	

Updated to match(es) played on 31 May 2021. Source: EFL Official Website
Rules for classification: 1) Points; 2) Goal difference; 3) Number of goals scored; 4) Head-to-head results; 5) Wins; 6) Away goals; 7) Penalty points (sec 9.5); 8) 12-point sending off offences
(C) Champions; (O) Play-off winners; (P) Promoted

==== Result summary ====
Overall								Home						Away					
Pld	W	D	L	GF	GA	GD	Pts	W	D	L	GF	GA	GD	W	D	L	GF	GA	GD
46	20	13	13	57	42	+15	73	13	5	5	27	17	+10	7	8	8	30	25	+5

Last updated: 1 May 2021.

==== Results by matchday ====
Matchday	1	2	3	4	5	6	7	8	9	10	11	12	13	14	15	16	17	18	19	20	21	22	23	24	25	26	27	28	29	30	31	32	33	34	35	36	37	38	39	40	41	42	43	44	45	46
Ground	A	H	A	H	A	H	A	A	H	H	A	H	H	A	H	A	A	A	H	A	H	A	A	A	H	H	H	H	A	H	A	A	H	A	A	H	A	H	A	H	H	H	A	H	H	A
Result	D	W	W	W	L	W	W	W	W	W	L	W	D	D	W	W	L	D	L	D	D	D	L	L	W	L	D	L	W	D	L	W	W	W	L	L	L	W	D	D	L	W	D	W	W	D
Position	10	9	3	1	3	2	2	1	1	1	1	1	1	1	1	1	1	1	1	1	2	2	3	7	4	5	5	7	6	6	8	6	6	4	4	5	7	7	7	6	7	7	7	6	5	5

Updated to match(es) played on 8 May 2021. Source: 11v11 for league tables and fixtures
A = Away; H = Home; W = Win; D = Draw; L = Loss

==== Matches ====
Win Draw Loss Postponed

The 2020–21 season fixtures were released on 21 August.

12 September 2020 1	Scunthorpe United	1–1	Newport County	Scunthorpe
15:00 BST (UTC+1)	Loft 58'	Report	Taylor 32'	Stadium: Glanford Park; Attendance: 0 Referee: Ben Speedie

19 September 2020 2	Newport County	2–1	Barrow	Newport
15:00 BST (UTC+1)	Shephard 19'; Taylor 48'	Report	Hardcastle 28'	Stadium: Rodney Parade; Attendance: 0 Referee: Robert Lewis

26 September 2020 3	Bolton Wanderers	0–2	Newport County	Bolton
15:00 BST (UTC+1)		Report	Abrahams 54', 63'	Stadium: University of Bolton Stadium; Attendance: 0 Referee: Chris Sarginson

3 October 2020 4	Newport County	2–1	Mansfield Town	Newport
15:00 BST (UTC+1)	Twine 78'; Dolan 88' (pen.)	Report	McLaughlin 69'	Stadium: Rodney Parade; Attendance: 0 Referee: Sam Allison

10 October 2020 5	Cambridge United	2–1	Newport County	Cambridge
15:00 BST (UTC+1)	Mullin 38', 61'	Report	Twine 67'	Stadium: Abbey Stadium; Attendance: 0 Referee: Carl Brook

17 October 2020 6	Newport County	1–0	Tranmere Rovers	Newport
15:00 BST (UTC+1)	Janneh 25'	Report		Stadium: Rodney Parade; Attendance: 0 Referee: Antony Coggins

20 October 2020 7	Stevenage	0–1	Newport County	Stevenage
19:00 BST (UTC+1)		Report	Abrahams 8' (pen.)	Stadium: Broadhall Way; Attendance: 0 Referee: Lee Swabey

24 October 2020 8	Bradford City	0–3	Newport County	Bradford
15:00 BST (UTC+1)		Report	Demetriou 1'; Amond 44'; Dolan 90+3' (pen.)	Stadium: Valley Parade; Attendance: 0 Referee: Declan Bourne

27 October 2020 9	Newport County	2–1	Colchester United	Newport
19:00 UTC	Twine 51'; Amond 90+1'	Report	Brown 89'	Stadium: Rodney Parade; Attendance: 0 Referee: Peter Wright

31 October 2020 10	Newport County	2–1	Harrogate Town	Newport
15:00 UTC	Amond 30'; Cooper 88'	Report	Muldoon 44'	Stadium: Rodney Parade; Attendance: 0 Referee: Paul Howard

3 November 2020 11	Carlisle United	3–2	Newport County	Carlisle
19:00 UTC	Alessandra 15' (pen.); Mellish 68', 81'	Report	Devitt 84'; Sheehan 90+2'	Stadium: Brunton Park; Attendance: 0 Referee: Scott Oldham

21 November 2020 12	Newport County	1–0	Port Vale	Newport
15:00 UTC	Ellison 90+6'	Report		Stadium: Rodney Parade; Attendance: 0 Referee: Alan Young

24 November 2020 13	Newport County	1–1	Walsall	Newport
19:00 UTC	Twine 23'	Report	Adebayo 21'	Stadium: Rodney Parade; Attendance: 0 Referee: Charles Breakspear

1 December 2020 14	Forest Green Rovers	1–1	Newport County	Nailsworth
19:00 UTC	Matt 76'	Report	Abrahams 45+2' (pen.)	Stadium: The New Lawn; Attendance: 0 Referee: Ben Toner

5 December 2020 15	Newport County	2–1	Morecambe	Newport
15:00 UTC	Amond 11'; Dolan 83' (pen.)	Report	Mendes Gomes 32'	Stadium: Rodney Parade; Attendance: 0 Referee: Sam Purkiss

8 December 2020 16	Grimsby Town	0–2	Newport County	Cleethorpes
19:00 UTC		Report	Twine 25'; Amond 45+1' (pen.)	Stadium: Blundell Park; Attendance: 0 Referee: Anthony Backhouse

12 December 2020 17	Leyton Orient	2–1	Newport County	Leyton, London
15:00 UTC	Johnson 62'; Brophy 70'	Report	Proctor 25'	Stadium: Brisbane Road; Attendance: 1,734; Referee: Tom Nield

15 December 2020 18	Salford City	1–1	Newport County	Salford
19:00 UTC	Clarke 44'	Report	Sheehan 90+4' (pen.)	Stadium: Moor Lane; Attendance: 0 Referee: Ross Joyce

19 December 2020 19	Newport County	2–4	Oldham Athletic	Newport
15:00 UTC	Twine 8'; Bennett 41'	Report	Keillor-Dunn 14'; McAleny 58'; McCalmont 85'; Dearnley 90+3'	Stadium: Rodney Parade; Attendance: 0 Referee: Bobby Madley

26 December 2020 20	Crawley Town	1–1	Newport County	Crawley
15:00 UTC	Demetriou 32' (o.g.)	Report	Haynes 5'	Stadium: Broadfield Stadium; Attendance: 0 Referee: David Rock

16 January 2021 21	Newport County	0–0	Salford City	Newport
15:00 UTC		Report		Stadium: Rodney Parade; Attendance: 0 Referee: Anthony Backhouse

19 January 2021 22	Cheltenham Town	1–1	Newport County	Cheltenham
19:00 UTC	Blair 45+5'	Report	King 12'	Stadium: Whaddon Road; Attendance: 0 Referee: Peter Wright

23 January 2021 23	Oldham Athletic	3–2	Newport County	Oldham
15:00 UTC	Keillor-Dunn 8'; Grant 29'; Demetriou 74' (o.g.)	Report	Scrimshaw 3'; Gambin 40'	Stadium: Boundary Park; Attendance: 0 Referee: Chris Sarginson

30 January 2021 24	Harrogate Town	2–1	Newport County	Harrogate
15:00 UTC	March 34'; Martin 66'	Report	Scrimshaw 17'	Stadium: Wetherby Road; Attendance: 0 Referee: Christopher Pollard

6 February 2021 25	Newport County	1–0	Grimsby Town	Newport
15:00 UTC	Maynard 51'	Report		Stadium: Rodney Parade; Attendance: 0 Referee: Craig Hicks

9 February 2021 26	Newport County	0–1	Southend United	Newport
19:00 UTC		Report	Clifford 74'	Stadium: Rodney Parade; Attendance: 0 Referee: Paul Howard

16 February 2021 27	Newport County	1–1	Exeter City	Newport
19:00 UTC	Telford 88'	Report	Bowman 22'	Stadium: Rodney Parade; Attendance: 0 Referee: Tom Nield

21 February 2021 28	Newport County	0–2	Forest Green Rovers	Newport
13:00 UTC		Report	Davison 43'; Matt 63' (pen.)	Stadium: Rodney Parade; Attendance: 0 Referee: Neil Hair

24 February 2021 29	Walsall	0–1	Newport County	Walsall
17:30 UTC		Report	Labadie 71'	Stadium: Bescot Stadium; Attendance: 0 Referee: Sam Allison

27 February 2021 30	Newport County	0–0	Stevenage	Newport
15:00 UTC		Report		Stadium: Rodney Parade; Attendance: 0 Referee: James Bell

2 March 2021 31	Tranmere Rovers	1–0	Newport County	Birkenhead
19:00 UTC	Woolery 7'	Report		Stadium: Prenton Park; Attendance: 0 Referee: Ben Toner

6 March 2021 32	Colchester United	0–2	Newport County	Colchester
15:00 UTC		Report	Labadie 30'; Amond 78'	Stadium: Colchester Community Stadium; Attendance: 0 Referee: Antony Coggins

9 March 2021 33	Newport County	2–1	Bradford City	Cardiff
19:00 UTC	Dolan 77', 90+6' (pen.)	Report	Cook 46'	Stadium: Cardiff City Stadium; Attendance: 0 Referee: Will Finnie

13 March 2021 34	Morecambe	1–3	Newport County	Morecambe
15:00 UTC	Songo'o 20'	Report	Dolan 8' (pen.); Sheehan 45+1'; Ellison 79'	Stadium: Mazuma Stadium; Attendance: 0 Referee: Andy Haines

16 March 2021 35	Port Vale	2–1	Newport County	Stoke-on-Trent
19:00 UTC	Conlon 12'; Rodney 75'	Report	Scrimshaw 55'	Stadium: Vale Park; Attendance: 0 Referee: Marc Edwards

20 March 2021 36	Newport County	0–1	Leyton Orient	Cardiff
13:00 UTC		Report	Wilkinson 61'	Stadium: Cardiff City Stadium; Attendance: 0 Referee: Sam Barrott

2 April 2021 37	Barrow	2–1	Newport County	Barrow-in-Furness
15:00 BST (UTC+1)	Quigley 56'; Devitt 84'	Report	Bennett 24'	Stadium: Holker Street; Attendance: 0 Referee: Lee Mason

5 April 2021 38	Newport County	1–0	Bolton Wanderers	Newport
15:00 BST (UTC+1)	Maynard 63'	Report		Stadium: Rodney Parade; Attendance: 0 Referee: Graham Salisbury

9 April 2021 39	Mansfield Town	1–1	Newport County	Mansfield
18:00 BST (UTC+1)	Sinclair 84'	Report	Labadie 75'	Stadium: Field Mill; Attendance: 0 Referee: Christopher Pollard

13 April 2021 40	Newport County	0–0	Carlisle United	Newport
19:00 BST (UTC+1)		Report		Stadium: Rodney Parade; Attendance: 0 Referee: Lee Swabey

17 April 2021 41	Newport County	0–1	Cambridge United	Newport
12:30 BST (UTC+1)		Report	Drysdale 79'	Stadium: Rodney Parade; Attendance: 0 Referee: Thomas Bramall

20 April 2021 42	Newport County	2–0	Crawley Town	Newport
19:00 BST (UTC+1)	Shephard 52'; Lewis 90+10'	Report		Stadium: Rodney Parade; Attendance: 0 Referee: Alan Young

24 April 2021 43	Exeter City	0–0	Newport County	Exeter
15:00 BST (UTC+1)		Report		Stadium: St James Park; Attendance: 0 Referee: Robert Lewis

27 April 2021 44	Newport County	4–0	Scunthorpe United	Newport
18:30 BST (UTC+1)	Taft 29' (o.g.); Demetriou 34', 85'; Collins 39'	Report		Stadium: Rodney Parade; Attendance: 0 Referee: Craig Hicks

1 May 2021 45	Newport County	1–0	Cheltenham Town	Newport
15:00 BST (UTC+1)	Labadie 4'	Report		Stadium: Rodney Parade; Attendance: 0 Referee: Scott Oldham

8 May 2021 46	Southend United	1–1	Newport County	Southend-on-Sea
15:00 BST (UTC+1)	Hobson 11'	Report	Demetriou 56'	Stadium: Roots Hall; Attendance: 0 Referee: John Brooks

==== Play-offs ====
18 May 2021 1st Leg	Newport County	2–0	Forest Green Rovers	Newport
20:15 BST (UTC+1)	Dolan 31'; Collins 56'	Report		Stadium: Rodney Parade; Attendance: 900; Referee: Charles Breakspear

23 May 2021 2nd leg	Forest Green Rovers	4–3 (a.e.t.) (4–5 agg.)	Newport County	Nailsworth
18:30 BST (UTC+1)	Adams 7'; Collins 8'; Cadden 53'; Matt 87'	Report	Ellison 70'; Labadie 76'; Maynard 119'	Stadium: The New Lawn; Attendance: 1,100; Referee: Martin Coy

31 May 2021 Final	Morecambe	1–0 (a.e.t.)	Newport County	Wembley Stadium, London
15:00 BST (UTC+1)	Mendes Gomes 107' (pen.)	Report		Attendance: 9,083; Referee: Bobby Madley

=== FA Cup ===
Win Draw Loss Postponed

The draw for the first round was made on Monday 26 October. The second round draw was revealed on Monday 9 November by Danny Cowley. The third round draw was made on 30 November, with Premier League and EFL Championship clubs all entering the competition.

7 November 2020 First round	Leyton Orient	1–2	Newport County	Leyton, London
15:00 UTC	Kyprianou 40'	Report	Baker 37'; Devitt 77'	Stadium: Brisbane Road; Attendance: 0 Referee: James Adcock

28 November 2020 Second round	Newport County	3–0	Salford City	Newport
13:00 UTC	Proctor 56'; Amond 75' (pen.); Janneh 90+2'	Report		Stadium: Rodney Parade; Attendance: 0 Referee: Kevin Johnson

10 January 2021 Third round	Newport County	1–1 (a.e.t.) (3–4 p)	Brighton & Hove Albion	Newport
19:45 UTC	Webster 90+6' (o.g.)	Report	March 90'	Stadium: Rodney Parade; Attendance: 0 Referee: Lee Mason
	Penalties
	Sheehan (penalty missed); Demetriou (penalty missed); Labadie (penalty scored); Taylor (penalty scored); Shephard (penalty missed); Proctor (penalty scored); Bennett (penalty missed)		(penalty scored) Groß; (penalty missed) Maupay; (penalty missed) Bissouma; (penalty scored) Dunk; (penalty missed) Trossard; (penalty scored) Pröpper; (penalty scored) Webster

=== EFL Cup ===
Win Draw Loss Postponed

The first round draw was made on 18 August, live on Sky Sports, by Paul Merson. The draw for both the second and third round were confirmed on 6 September, live on Sky Sports by Phil Babb. The draw was conducted on 17 September 2020 by Laura Woods and Lee Hendrie live on Sky Sports.

5 September 2020 First round	Newport County	2–0	Swansea City	Newport
15:00 BST (UTC+1)	Abrahams 7', 45'	Report		Stadium: Rodney Parade; Attendance: 0 Referee: Kevin Johnson

15 September 2020 Second round	Newport County	1–0	Cambridge United	Newport
19:00 BST (UTC+1)	Twine 80'	Report		Stadium: Rodney Parade; Attendance: 0 Referee: Lee Swabey

22 September 2020 Third round	Newport County	3–1	Watford	Newport
19:00 BST (UTC+1)	Abrahams 18' (pen.); Labadie 28'; Amond 65'	Report	Peñaranda 54' (pen.)	Stadium: Rodney Parade; Attendance: 0 Referee: Charles Breakspear

30 September 2020 Fourth round	Newport County	1–1 (4–5 p)	Newcastle United	Newport
19:00 BST (UTC+1)	Abrahams 5'	Report	Shelvey 87'	Stadium: Rodney Parade; Attendance: 0 Referee: John Brooks
	Penalties
	Demetriou (penalty scored); Abrahams (penalty scored); Sheehan (penalty scored); Taylor (penalty missed); Dolan (penalty scored); Cooper (penalty missed)		(penalty scored) Wilson; (penalty missed) Joelinton; (penalty scored) Schär; (penalty scored) Shelvey; (penalty scored) Murphy; (penalty scored) Longstaff

=== EFL Trophy ===
Win Draw Loss Postponed

The regional group stage draw was confirmed on 18 August 2020.

Pos	Div	Team	Pld	W	PW	PL	L	GF	GA	GD	Pts	Qualification
1	L2	Cheltenham Town	3	3	0	0	0	4	0	+4	9	Advance to Round 2
2	ACA	Norwich City U21	3	2	0	0	1	8	3	+5	6	Advance to Round 2
3	L1	Plymouth Argyle	3	1	0	0	2	5	6	−1	3	
4	L2	Newport County	3	0	0	0	3	1	9	−8	0	

Source: EFL.com

8 September 2020 Southern Group F	Newport County	0–1	Cheltenham Town	Newport
19:00 BST (UTC+1)		Report	Reid 70'	Stadium: Rodney Parade; Attendance: 0 Referee: James Adcock

6 October 2020 Southern Group F	Newport County	0–5	Norwich City U21	Newport
19:00 BST (UTC+1)		Report	Omotoye 2', 49', 75'; Dennis 77'; Martin 83' (pen.)	Stadium: Rodney Parade; Attendance: 0 Referee: Will Finnie

10 November 2020 Southern Group F	Plymouth Argyle	3–1	Newport County	Plymouth
19:00 UTC	Reeves 30'; Cooper 48', 59'	Report	Amond 64'	Stadium: Home Park; Attendance: 0 Referee: Brett Huxtable

=== Welsh League Cup ===
The draw for the Welsh League Cup sponsored by Nathaniel MG was made on 2 December 2020 with Newport County and Cardiff City invited as wildcard entries. The fixture was postponed and the competition was subsequently cancelled by the Football Association of Wales due to the Coronavirus pandemic.

12 December 2020 Southern Section first round	Newport County	P-P	Undy	Newport
15:00 UTC				Stadium: Rodney Parade

== Squad statistics ==
Numbers in parentheses denote appearances as substitute.
Players with squad numbers struck through and marked † left the club during the playing season.
Players with names in italics and marked * were on loan from another club for the whole of their season with Newport County.
Players listed with no appearances have been in the matchday squad but only as unused substitutes.
Key to positions: GK – Goalkeeper; DF – Defender; MF – Midfielder; FW – Forward

As of 10 February 2021

No.	Pos	Nat	Player	Total		League Two		FA Cup		League Cup		League Trophy	
No.	Pos	Nat	Player	Apps	Goals	Apps	Goals	Apps	Goals	Apps	Goals	Apps	Goals
1	GK	(Wales) WAL	Tom King	9	1	3+1	1	2+0	0	1+0	0	2+0	0
2	DF	(Wales) WAL	Ash Baker	8	1	1+3	0	1+0	1	0+0	0	3+0	0
3	DF	(England) ENG	Ryan Haynes	33	1	25+0	1	3+0	0	4+0	0	1+0	0
4	MF	(England) ENG	Joss Labadie	22	1	16+3	0	0+1	0	2+0	1	0+0	0
5	DF	(England) ENG	Kyle Howkins	4	0	2+0	0	0+0	0	2+0	0	0+0	0
6	DF	(England) ENG	Priestley Farquharson	2	0	1+1	0	0+0	0	0+0	0	0+0	0
7	MF	(England) ENG	Robbie Willmott	28	0	5+14	0	2+1	0	1+3	0	2+0	0
8	MF	(England) ENG	Matt Dolan	29	3	23+1	3	2+0	0	3+0	0	0+0	0
9	FW	(Republic of Ireland) IRL	Pádraig Amond	34	8	12+12	5	1+2	1	3+1	1	3+0	1
10	MF	(Wales) WAL	Josh Sheehan	30	2	23+0	2	3+0	0	4+0	0	0+0	0
11	FW	(England) ENG	Tristan Abrahams	28	8	15+8	4	1+0	0	4+0	4	0+0	0
14	DF	(Wales) WAL	Aaron Lewis	3	0	1+2	0	0+0	0	0+0	0	0+0	0
15	DF	(England) ENG	David Longe-King	9	0	6+2	0	1+0	0	0+0	0	0+0	0
16	FW	(Malta) MLT	Luke Gambin	4	2	4+0	2	0+0	0	0+0	0	0+0	0
17	DF	(England) ENG	Scot Bennett	27	1	14+6	1	3+0	0	2+0	0	2+0	0
18	FW	(England) ENG	Nicky Maynard	2	1	2+0	1	0+0	0	0+0	0	0+0	0
19	FW	(England) ENG	Dom Telford	3	0	1+2	0	0+0	0	0+0	0	0+0	0
20	MF	(England) ENG	Anthony Hartigan	2	0	2+0	0	0+0	0	0+0	0	0+0	0
21	FW	(Wales) WAL	Lewis Collins	10	0	2+3	0	0+1	0	1+2	0	1+0	0
22	FW	(England) ENG	Kevin Ellison	16	1	1+10	1	0+3	0	0+0	0	1+1	0
24	MF	(Wales) WAL	Jack Evans	1	0	0+1	0	0+0	0	0+0	0	0+0	0
26	FW	(England) ENG	Owen Windsor	1	0	0+1	0	0+0	0	0+0	0	0+0	0
27	FW	(England) ENG	Jake Scrimshaw	6	1	4+2	1	0+0	0	0+0	0	0+0	0
28	DF	(England) ENG	Mickey Demetriou	32	1	26+0	1	3+0	0	3+0	0	0+0	0
29	FW	(England) ENG	Ryan Taylor	14	2	7+2	2	0+1	0	0+3	0	1+0	0
30	GK	(England) ENG	Nick Townsend	27	0	23+0	0	1+0	0	3+0	0	0+0	0
32	DF	(Wales) WAL	Liam Shephard	29	1	22+0	1	2+0	0	4+0	0	0+1	0
33	DF	(England) ENG	Joe Woodiwiss	3	0	0+0	0	0+0	0	0+0	0	3+0	0
35	FW	(Wales) WAL	Ryan Hillier	3	0	0+0	0	0+0	0	0+0	0	0+3	0
36	FW	(Wales) WAL	Lewys Twamley	3	0	0+0	0	0+0	0	0+0	0	2+1	0
37	MF	(Wales) WAL	Sonny Lewis	2	0	0+0	0	0+0	0	0+0	0	1+1	0
38	GK	(Wales) WAL	Callum Brain	1	0	0+0	0	0+0	0	0+0	0	1+0	0
40	DF	(Wales) WAL	Harrison Bright	2	0	0+0	0	0+0	0	0+0	0	0+2	0
41	MF	(Wales) WAL	Callum Ryan-Phillip	2	0	0+0	0	0+0	0	0+0	0	2+0	0
42	MF	(Wales) WAL	Zack Maher	1	0	0+0	0	0+0	0	0+0	0	0+1	0
45	MF	(Wales) WAL	Aneurin Livermore	1	0	0+0	0	0+0	0	0+0	0	1+0	0
Players who left the club::
6	DF	(Wales) WAL	Brandon Cooper	25	1	18+1	1	2+0	0	3+0	0	1+0	0
14	MF	(Republic of Ireland) IRL	Jamie Devitt	11	2	1+7	1	3+0	1	0+0	0	0+0	0
16	DF	(England) ENG	Bradley Webb	2	0	0+0	0	0+0	0	0+0	0	2+0	0
18	FW	(England) ENG	Jamie Proctor	13	2	5+5	1	2+1	1	0+0	0	0+0	0
19	FW	(England) ENG	Scott Twine	24	7	18+1	6	1+0	0	3+0	1	1+0	0
20	FW	(The Gambia) GAM	Saikou Janneh	12	2	4+4	1	0+1	1	0+1	0	2+0	0

=== Goals record ===
As of 10 February 2020

Rank	No.	Nat.	Po.	Name	League Two	FA Cup	League Cup	League Trophy	Total
1	9	(Republic of Ireland)	CF	Pádraig Amond	5	1	1	1	8
1	11	(England)	CF	Tristan Abrahams	4	0	4	0	8
3	19	(England)	CF	Scott Twine	6	0	1	0	7
4	8	(England)	CM	Matt Dolan	3	0	0	0	3
6	10	(Wales)	CM	Josh Sheehan	2	0	0	0	2
6	14	(Republic of Ireland)	CM	Jamie Devitt	1	1	0	0	2
6	16	(Malta)	RW	Luke Gambin	2	0	0	0	2
6	18	(England)	CF	Jamie Proctor	1	1	0	0	2
6	20	(The Gambia)	CF	Saikou Janneh	1	1	0	0	2
6	29	(England)	CF	Ryan Taylor	2	0	0	0	2
11	1	(Wales)	GK	Tom King	1	0	0	0	1
11	2	(Wales)	RB	Ash Baker	0	1	0	0	1
11	3	(England)	LB	Ryan Haynes	1	0	0	0	1
11	4	(England)	CM	Joss Labadie	0	0	1	0	1
11	6	(Wales)	CB	Brandon Cooper	1	0	0	0	1
11	17	(England)	CB	Scot Bennett	1	0	0	0	1
11	18	(England)	CF	Nicky Maynard	1	0	0	0	1
11	22	(England)	LW	Kevin Ellison	1	0	0	0	1
11	27	(England)	CF	Jake Scrimshaw	1	0	0	0	1
11	28	(England)	CB	Mickey Demetriou	1	0	0	0	1
11	32	(Wales)	RB	Liam Shephard	1	0	0	0	1
Own Goals					0	1	0	0	1
Total					33	6	7	1	47

=== Disciplinary record ===
As of 10 February 2021

Rank	No.	Nat.	Po.	Name	League Two			FA Cup			League Cup			League Trophy			Total					
Rank	No.	Nat.	Po.	Name	Booked	(yellow card) (yellow-red card)	Sent off (straight red)	Booked	(yellow card) (yellow-red card)	Sent off (straight red)	Booked	(yellow card) (yellow-red card)	Sent off (straight red)	Booked	(yellow card) (yellow-red card)	Sent off (straight red)	Booked	(yellow card) (yellow-red card)	Sent off (straight red)			
1	4	(England)	CM	Joss Labadie	5	0	1	0	0	0	2	0	0	0	0	0	7	0	1			
2	17	(England)	CB	Scot Bennett	4	0	1	1	0	0	1	0	0	0	0	0	6	0	1			
3	~~6~~	(Wales)	CB	Brandon Cooper	4	0	0	0	0	0	0	0	0	0	0	0	4	0	0			
3	7	(England)	RM	Robbie Willmott	2	0	0	0	0	0	0	0	0	2	0	0	4	0	0			
3	32	(Wales)	RB	Liam Shephard	3	0	1	0	0	0	0	0	0	0	0	0	3	0	1			
6	10	(Wales)	CM	Josh Sheehan	2	0	1	0	0	0	0	0	0	0	0	0	2	0	1			
7	3	(England)	LB	Ryan Haynes	2	0	0	0	0	0	0	0	0	0	0	0	2	0	0			
7	28	(England)	CB	Mickey Demetriou	2	0	0	0	0	0	0	0	0	0	0	0	2	0	0			
7	33	(England)	RB	Joe Woodiwiss	0	0	0	0	0	0	0	0	0	2	0	0	2	0	0			
10	2	(Wales)	RB	Ash Baker	0	0	0	0	0	0	0	0	0	1	0	0	1	0	0			
10	5	(England)	CB	Kyle Howkins	1	0	0	0	0	0	0	0	0	0	0	0	1	0	0			
10	9	(Republic of Ireland)	CF	Pádraig Amond	0	0	0	0	0	0	1	0	0	0	0	0	1	0	0			
10	11	(England)	CF	Tristan Abrahams	1	0	0	0	0	0	0	0	0	0	0	0	1	0	0			
10	18	(England)	CF	Jamie Proctor	0	0	0	1	0	0	0	0	0	0	0	0	1	0	1			
10	19	(England)	CF	Scott Twine	1	0	0	0	0	0	0	0	0	0	0	0	1	0	0			
10	22	(England)	LW	Kevin Ellison	0	0	0	0	0	0	0	0	0	1	0	0	1	0	0			
10	24	(Wales)	RB	Aaron Lewis	1	0	0	0	0	0	0	0	0	0	0	0	1	0	0			
Total					27	0	4	2	0	0	4	0	0	6	0	0	1	0	0	40	0	4
