= Darren Kelly =

Northern Irish association football player

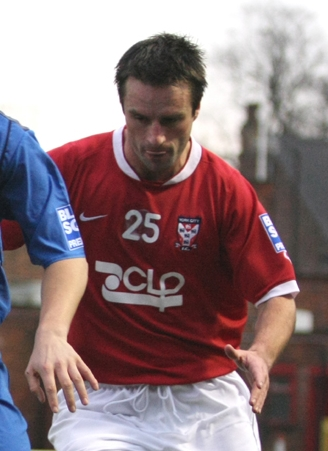
- Kelly playing for York City in 2007

Personal information
- Full name: Darren Kelly
- Date of birth: 30 June 1979 (age 47)
- Place of birth: Derry, Northern Ireland
- Height: 6 ft 1 in (1.85 m)
- Position: Centre-back

Youth career
- Trojans
- Derry City

Senior career*
Years	Team	Apps	(Gls)
1996–2002	Derry City	312	(32)
2002–2004	Carlisle United	72	(2)
2004–2006	Portadown	94	(22)
2006–2007	Derry City	42	(6)
2007–2009	York City	86	(2)
2009–2011	Portadown	53	(4)
2011	Stalybridge Celtic	0	(0)
2011–2012	Garforth Town	34	(7)
2012–2013	Frickley Athletic	0	(0)
2013–2015	Scarborough Athletic	2	(0)
Total		695	(75)

International career
2000–2001	Northern Ireland U21	11	(0)

Managerial career
- 2015: Oldham Athletic
- 2015: FC Halifax Town
- 2016: Hyde United
- 2016–2019: Hyde United
- 2019–2021: Scarborough Athletic
- 2021–2023: Newport County (sporting director)
- 2022: Newport County (caretaker)
- * Club domestic league appearances and goals

Darren Kelly (born 30 June 1979) is a Northern Irish professional football manager and former player who played as a centre-back. He is the general manager of National League club York City.

Kelly began his career at hometown club Derry City making over 300 appearances before moving to English Third Division club Carlisle United, following financial difficulties at Derry. He spent two seasons with the club, which included an appearance in the 2003 Football League Trophy final, after which he was released and returned to Northern Ireland with Portadown. He captained the team and eventually left after his contract expired in 2006, when he rejoined Derry for a second spell. He featured for the team in European competition and attracted the attention of several Scottish Premier League clubs, before eventually joining York City in the Conference Premier in 2007. After leaving York in 2009 he rejoined Portadown, who released him in 2011. Kelly then resumed his career in English non-League football, playing for Stalybridge Celtic, Garforth Town, Frickley Athletic and Scarborough Athletic.

Kelly started his coaching career with spells at York and Sunderland, before being appointed manager of League One club Oldham Athletic in May 2015. He was dismissed in September 2015, and took over at National League team FC Halifax Town in October, before he left by mutual agreement a month later. Kelly took over at Northern Premier League Premier Division club Hyde United in March 2016, and left the club a month later after they were relegated but was reappointed a month later.

== Early life ==
Kelly was born in Derry, Northern Ireland and grew up close to Derry City's ground, the Brandywell Stadium.

== Club career ==
Having played with Trojans in the Derry and District League as a youth, Kelly progressed through the Derry City youth system and made his first-team debut at home to Sligo Rovers on 18 February 1996.

Newspaper reports in October 2001 claimed Kelly had joined English Third Division club Carlisle United, which were denied by Derry, who had rejected Carlisle's £100,000 bid for him. He featured for Derry in the League of Ireland Cup Final in April 2002, and scored in the penalty shoot-out, which the team lost 3–2. He eventually became one of many League of Ireland players who joined Carlisle under the management of Roddy Collins in August 2002 for a fee believed to be around £100,000. He made his Carlisle debut in a 2–0 defeat to Darlington on 27 August. He featured for Carlisle in the 2003 Football League Trophy final on 6 April 2003, which they lost 2–0 to Bristol City. His first goal for Carlisle came as the equaliser in a 1–1 draw against York City and he finished the 2002–03 season with 42 appearances. Derry revealed they were interested in re-signing Kelly in December 2003, after he was transfer-listed by Carlisle. Following the end of the 2003–04 season, Carlisle manager Paul Simpson told Kelly he needed to get fit if he wanted to stay at the club.

He was one of three players released by Carlisle, after which he signed a two-year contract for Portadown in August 2004. Kelly won the 2004–05 Irish Cup with Portadown, and scored in the 5–1 win over Larne in the final. He became Portadown captain for the 2005–06 season and by December 2005 was being linked with a move away from the club, with his contract expiring in the summer. He won the Harp player of the month award for February 2006. He launched a stinging attack on the "prima donnas" at the club and felt some of his teammates lacked "ambition and determination".

Kelly looked set to join League Two club Stockport County on a two-year contract in April 2006, but a day later he said he was yet to decide whether to join them. Having made 52 league appearances for Portadown he rejected a new contract at the club with the aim of returning to professional football. He eventually chose to return to his old club Derry City for the second time in May. He played in all of Derry's six matches in the 2006–07 UEFA Cup campaign, which included a goal in the 5–1 victory over Gretna. He was chosen as the Soccer Writer's Association of Ireland Player of the Month in September 2006. He was named in the Professional Footballer Association of Ireland's team of the year in December 2006. He featured for Derry in the first qualifying round of the UEFA Champions League in the 2007–08 season, playing in the 2–0 defeat to FC Pyunik. He made 29 league appearances in his second spell as a Derry player.

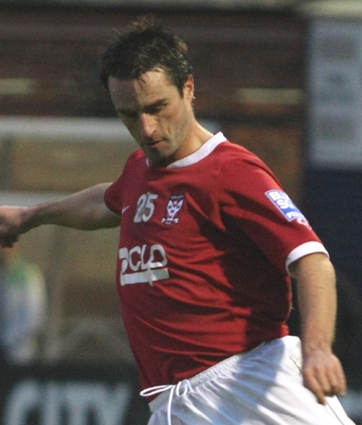
Kelly playing for York City in 2007

Kelly trialled at Kilmarnock of the Scottish Premier League in July 2007, while Gretna were also interested in signing him, but refused to pay the £50,000 Derry wanted for him. Inverness Caledonian Thistle and Dundee United had also made inquiries about signing Kelly, although Inverness were only interested in loan terms. Kelly instead signed for Conference Premier club York City on 29 August on a two-year contract for an undisclosed five-figure fee, with family reasons being his motivation for moving to a British club. A day after signing for the club, he made his debut against Rushden & Diamonds and scored a late own goal, meaning his new team lost 3–2. He was ruled out for at least a month with a suspected torn hamstring in January 2008, which was picked up in training, and returned to the team in their 2–0 defeat against Cambridge United on 1 March 2008, after coming on as a 53rd-minute substitute for Darren Craddock. He finished the 2007–08 season with 33 appearances and 2 goals for York. Kelly drew praise from York manager Colin Walker following York's 2–0 victory against Woking in October, which was his first start of the 2008–09 season. Following this, he admitted fears over his future at York after struggling to feature in the team, having only made two starts since April. It was confirmed in March 2009 that he would leave York at the end of the 2008–09 season.

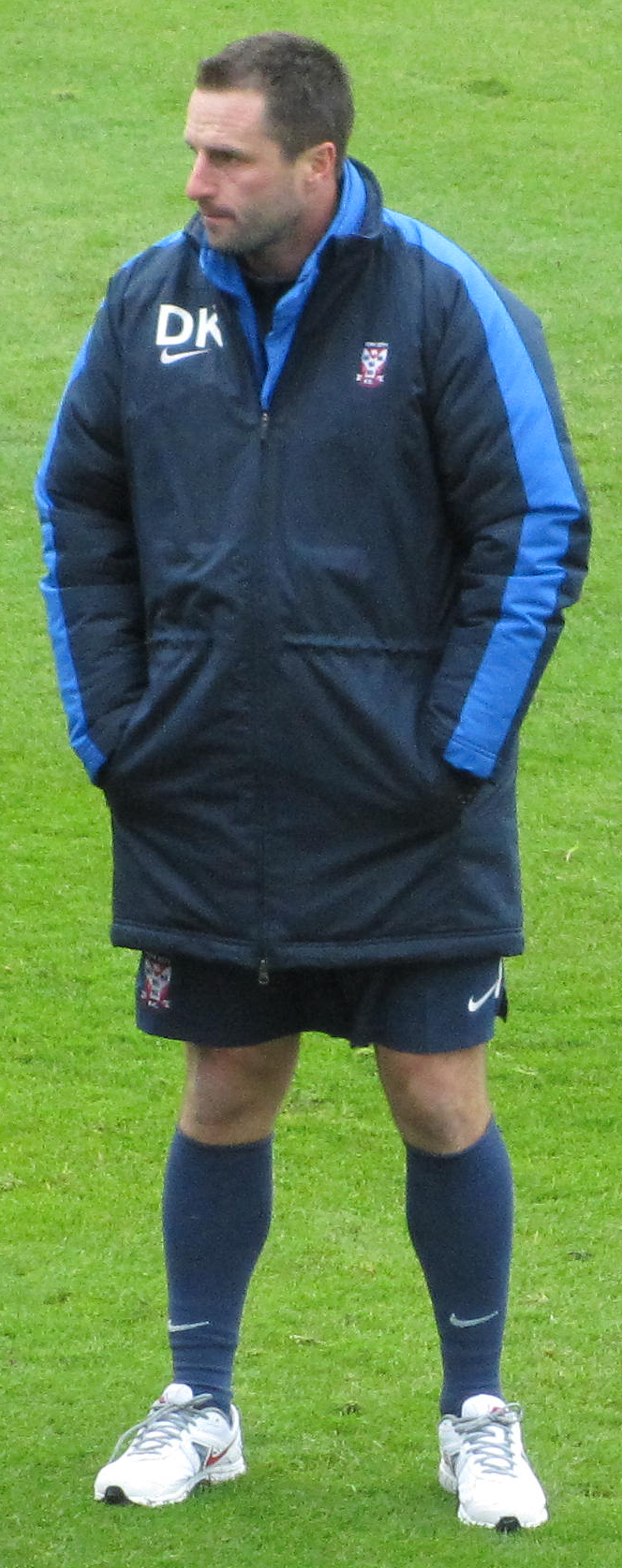
Kelly with York City in 2012

Kelly returned to Northern Ireland after re-signing for Portadown on a three-year contract in May 2009 and made 53 league appearances in his second spell with the club. After being released by the club in January 2011 because of work commitments he signed for Conference North club Stalybridge Celtic on 25 January. He left the club in February having made no appearances and signed for Northern Premier League Division One North club Garforth Town, making his debut in a 1–1 draw with Ossett Albion on 22 February 2011. Kelly joined former club York as a community coach and an under-14 Centre of Excellence coach in March 2011. He finished the 2010–11 season with 14 appearances and 4 goals for Garforth, and in the following season made 24 appearances and scored 4 goals. He signed for Northern Premier League Premier Division club Frickley Athletic in July 2012, and by September had been appointed to oversee under-12s to under-16s development at York.

Kelly signed for Northern Counties East League Premier Division club Scarborough Athletic in January 2013. He became an academy coach at Sunderland in January 2015.

== International career ==
Kelly was capped 11 times by Northern Ireland at under-21 level from 2000 to 2001.

== Managerial career ==
Kelly was appointed manager of League One club Oldham Athletic on a two-year contract on 4 May 2015, with Dean Holden becoming his assistant. Kelly was dismissed just nine matches into his career at Oldham, after a 5–1 home defeat by Peterborough United on 12 September 2015.

On 1 October 2015, Kelly was appointed as manager of National League club FC Halifax Town for the rest of 2015–16, with Jim Harvey as his assistant. Two days later he lost his first match in charge, a 7–1 home defeat to Cheltenham Town. Kelly left FC Halifax by mutual agreement on 17 November 2015, with only two wins from his 10 matches in charge including a 7–0 defeat to Grimsby Town. After leaving Halifax they went on a twelve match unbeaten run.

Kelly was handed his third managerial position in a year when being appointed caretaker at Hyde United on 31 March 2016, who were in 20th-place in the Northern Premier League Premier Division table. However, he was unable to save them from relegation, finishing 22nd and losing all six games he took charge of. He left the club on 23 April 2016, though he was then re-appointed a month later and guided the club to the first round proper of the FA Cup in 2017–18, going out to MK Dons at home in a BBC televised match. By the end of the season, Kelly had led Hyde to promotion back to the Northern Premier League Premier Division.

Kelly was appointed as manager of Scarborough Athletic on 6 December 2019. He continued his day job as manager of Tadcaster Albion's i2i academy team. Kelly resigned as Scarborough manager on 18 May 2021 and was subsequently replaced by Jonathan Greening.

Kelly was appointed sporting director at Newport County on 7 June 2021 to work alongside first-team manager Michael Flynn. Flynn resigned on 1 October 2021 after nine league matches of the 2021–22 season with Newport 15th in League Two. Newport's assistant manager Wayne Hatswell was appointed as caretaker team manager.

On 19 October 2021, James Rowberry was appointed Newport County manager with the team 13th in the League Two after 13 league matches of the 2021–22 season. On 10 October 2022 Rowberry was sacked as team manager with Newport in 18th place in League Two after 13 league matches of the 2022–23 season. Assistant manager Carl Serrant was also sacked. Darren Kelly took the role of Newport caretaker manager. Kelly managed the team for two matches; the 2–1 League Two defeat to Crawley Town and the 2–1 EFL Trophy win against Southampton Under-21s. He resigned his role at Newport on 23 February 2023.

On 28 February 2023, Kelly was confirmed as the new sporting director of League Two side Hartlepool United. On 31 July 2023, it was announced that Kelly would step down from the role by mutual consent in September 2023 due to personal issues. He joined York City as general manager in August 2023.

== Career statistics ==
Appearances and goals by club, season and competition
Club	Season	League			FA Cup		League Cup		Other		Total	
Club	Season	Division	Apps	Goals	Apps	Goals	Apps	Goals	Apps	Goals	Apps	Goals
Carlisle United	2002–03	Third Division	62	1	2	0	1	0	7 (Note: Appearance(s) in Football League Trophy)	0	42	1
Carlisle United	2003–04	Third Division	10	1	0	0	1	0	1	0	12	1
Carlisle United	Total		72	2	2	0	2	0	8	0	54	2
York City	2007–08	Conference Premier	77	2	2	0	—		4 (Note: Three appearances in FA Trophy, one in Conference League Cup)	0	33	2
York City	2008–09	Conference Premier	9	0	1	0	—		2 (Note: One appearance in FA Trophy, one in Conference League Cup)	0	12	0
York City	Total		86	2	3	0	0	0	6	0	45	2
Stalybridge Celtic	2010–11	Conference North	0	0	0	0	—		0	0	0	0
Garforth Town	2010–11	Northern Premier League Division One North	14	4	0	0	—		0	0	14	4
Garforth Town	2011–12	Northern Premier League Division One North	20	3	2	0	—		2 (Note: Appearances in FA Trophy)	1	24	4
Garforth Town	Total		34	7	2	0	0	0	2	1	38	8
Career total			670	75	7	0	2	0	16	1	695	75

== Managerial statistics ==
As of match played 18 October 2022

Managerial record by team and tenure
Team	From	To	Record					Ref.
Team	From	To	P	W	D	L	Win %	Ref.
Oldham Athletic	4 May 2015	12 September 2015	9	1	4	4	11.1	
FC Halifax Town	1 October 2015	17 November 2015	10	2	1	7	20.0	
Hyde United	31 March 2016	25 May 2019	169	79	44	46	46.7	
Newport County (caretaker)	10 October 2022	Present	2	1	0	1	50.0	
Total			190	83	49	58	43.7	

== Honours ==
Carlisle United

- Football League Trophy runner-up: 2002–03

Portadown

- Irish Cup: 2004–05
