= James Waite (footballer, born 1999) =

Welsh footballer

Personal information
- Full name: James Tyler Waite
- Date of birth: 11 May 1999 (age 27)
- Place of birth: Sebastopol, Pontypool, Wales
- Position: Midfielder

Team information
- Current team: Gloucester City

Youth career
- 2015–2017: Cardiff City

Senior career*
| Years | Team | Apps | (Gls) |
| 2017–2021 | Cardiff City | 0 | (0) |
| 2019 | → Hereford (loan) | 9 | (2) |
| 2019–2020 | → Weston-super-Mare (loan) | 17 | (11) |
| 2020–2021 | → Weston-super-Mare (loan) | 5 | (2) |
| 2021 | → Waterford (loan) | 12 | (0) |
| 2021–2022 | Penybont | 17 | (7) |
| 2022–2024 | Newport County | 78 | (2) |
| 2024–2026 | Weston-super-Mare | 25 | (2) |
| 2025–2026 | → Eastleigh (loan) | 6 | (0) |
| 2026 | Eastleigh | 8 | (1) |
| 2026– | Gloucester City | 0 | (0) |

International career
| 2017 | Wales U19 | 1 | (0) |
| 2020 | Wales U21 | 2 | (0) |
- * Club domestic league appearances and goals as of 13:40, 27 March 2026 (UTC)

James Tyler Waite is a Welsh footballer who plays as a midfielder for Southern League Premier Division South club Gloucester City. He is a former Wales under-19 and under-21 international. Before beginning his professional career he attended West Monmouth School in Pontypool, Wales.

== Club career ==
=== Cardiff City ===
Born in Sebastopol, Pontypool, Wales, Waite progressed through the youth ranks at Cardiff City. In February 2017 he was rewarded with his first professional contract alongside teammates Connor Young and Cameron Coxe.

==== Hereford ====
In January 2019 he joined Hereford on a loan deal until the end of the 2018-19 National League North season. He scored the winning goal on his debut for Hereford in a 2-1 away win over York City on 5 February 2019.

==== Return to Cardiff City ====
On 27 August 2019, he made his debut appearance for Cardiff City as a 71st minute substitute for Gavin Whyte in a 3-0 home EFL Cup second round loss to Luton Town.

==== Weston-super-Mare ====
In October 2019, Waite joined Southern Premier Division side Weston-super-Mare on loan and made his debut in a 6-0 win over Dorchester Town. On 21 December 2019, he scored a hat-trick for Weston-super-Mare in a 4-0 away win over Harrow Borough. In January 2020, he saw his loan at Weston-super-Mare extended until the end of the season. On 11 February 2020, Waite scored his second hat-trick of his loan spell at Weston-super-Mare in a 5-0 home win over Wimborne Town.

In September 2020, he re-joined Weston-super-Mare on a season-long loan for the 2020-21 campaign. He returned to Cardiff at the end of January.

==== Waterford ====
He joined League of Ireland Premier Division club Waterford on loan on 24 February 2021. He made his debut for the club in the opening game of the season on 19 March 2021 as his side lost 1–0 away to newly promoted side Drogheda United.

==== Release by Cardiff City ====
On 1 June 2021, Cardiff City announced that Waite would be released following the end of his contract at the end of June. On 10 June Waterford confirmed that he had ended his loan spell at the club a few weeks early. He made a total of 12 appearances during his loan spell.

=== Penybont ===
In June 2021, Waite signed for Cymru Premier side Penybont.

=== Newport County ===
On 12 January 2022, Waite joined EFL League Two side Newport County on an eighteen-month contract, a move that saw him link up with his former Cardiff City youth coach James Rowberry. He made his debut for Newport on 15 January 2022 in the 4-0 League Two win against Harrogate Town as a second-half substitute. Waite scored his first goal for Newport on 5 March 2022 in the 1-0 League Two win against Bristol Rovers. In June 2023 Waite's Newport contract was extended by a further year to the end of the 2023-24 season.

On 8 May 2024, the club announced he would be leaving in the summer when his contract expired.

=== Weston-super-Mare ===
On 8 June 2024, Waite returned to National League South side Weston-super-Mare on a permanent contract.

=== Eastleigh ===
In November 2025, Waite joined National League club Eastleigh on loan until January 2026, reuniting with former Weston-super-Mare manager Scott Bartlett. Following the conclusion of this loan, he joined the club permanently on a deal until the end of the season.

=== Gloucester City ===
On 26 March 2026, Waite joined Southern League Premier Division South club Gloucester City on a contract until the end of the 2026–27 season.

== International career ==
Waite has represented Wales at under-19 level, taking part in the 2018 UEFA European Under-19 Championship qualification in Turkey at the Arslan Zeki Demirci Sports Complex in an international against Slovakia.

Waite has also represented Wales at under-21 level, winning two caps during the 2021 UEFA European Under-21 Championship qualification campaign in matches against Bosnia and Herzegovina and Belgium.

== Career statistics ==
As of end of 2023–24 season

Appearances and goals by club, season and competition
| Club | Season | League | | | National cup (Note: Includes FA Cup, Welsh Cup) | | League cup (Note: Includes EFL Cup, Welsh League Cup) | | Other | | Total | |
| Club | Season | Division | Apps | Goals | Apps | Goals | Apps | Goals | Apps | Goals | Apps | Goals |
|---|---|---|---|---|---|---|---|---|---|---|---|---|
| Cardiff City | 2018–19 | Premier League | 0 | 0 | 0 | 0 | 0 | 0 | 0 | 0 | 0 | 0 |
| Cardiff City | 2019–20 | Championship | 0 | 0 | 0 | 0 | 1 | 0 | 0 | 0 | 1 | 0 |
| Cardiff City | 2020–21 | Championship | 0 | 0 | 0 | 0 | 0 | 0 | 0 | 0 | 0 | 0 |
| Cardiff City | Total | | 0 | 0 | 0 | 0 | 1 | 0 | 0 | 0 | 1 | 0 |
| Hereford (loan) | 2018–19 | National League North | 9 | 2 | — | | — | | — | | 9 | 2 |
| Weston-super-Mare (loan) | 2019–20 | Southern League; Premier Division South | 17 | 11 | — | | — | | 2 (Note: One appearance in FA Trophy; one appearance, two goals in Somerset Premier Cup) | 2 | 19 | 13 |
| Weston-super-Mare (loan) | 2020–21 | Southern League; Premier Division South | 5 | 2 | 4 | 3 | — | | 2 (Note: Appearance(s) in FA Trophy) | 1 | 11 | 6 |
| Waterford (loan) | 2021 | League of Ireland; Premier Division | 12 | 0 | — | | — | | — | | 12 | 0 |
| Penybont | 2021–22 | Cymru Premier | 17 | 7 | 3 | 2 | 1 | 0 | — | | 21 | 9 |
| Newport County | 2021–22 | League Two | 16 | 2 | — | | — | | — | | 16 | 2 |
| Newport County | 2022–23 | League Two | 33 | 0 | 2 | 0 | 3 | 2 | 2 (Note: Appearance(s) in EFL Trophy) | 1 | 40 | 3 |
| Newport County | 2023–24 | League Two | 29 | 0 | 3 | 0 | 2 | 0 | 3 | 0 | 37 | 0 |
| Newport County | Total | | 78 | 2 | 5 | 0 | 5 | 2 | 5 | 1 | 93 | 5 |
| Career total | | | 138 | 24 | 12 | 5 | 7 | 2 | 9 | 4 | 166 | 35 |
