= Timmy Abraham =

English footballer (born 2000)

Personal information
- Full name: Jason Timiebi Ogheneobrucheme Bakumo-Abraham
- Date of birth: 28 December 2000 (age 25)
- Place of birth: Camberwell, England
- Height: 6 ft 1 in (1.85 m)
- Position: Forward

Team information
- Current team: Bognor Regis Town (dual-registration from Gosport Borough)

Youth career
- Charlton Athletic
- 2017–2019: Fulham

Senior career*
Years	Team	Apps	(Gls)
2019–2022	Fulham	0	(0)
2020	→ Bristol Rovers (loan)	4	(0)
2020–2021	→ Plymouth Argyle (loan)	3	(0)
2021	→ Raith Rovers (loan)	7	(0)
2021–2022	→ Newport County (loan)	12	(0)
2022–2023	Walsall	8	(0)
2022–2023	→ Oldham Athletic (loan)	15	(2)
2023–2024	Boreham Wood	12	(0)
2023–2024	→ Maidstone United (loan)	7	(0)
2024	Tonbridge Angels	6	(1)
2026–	Gosport Borough	0	(0)
2026–	→ Bognor Regis Town (dual-registration)	0	(0)
- * Club domestic league appearances and goals as of 09:46, 18 October 2026 (UTC)

Jason Timiebi Ogheneobrucheme Bakumo-Abraham (born 28 December 2000), known as Timmy Abraham, is an English professional footballer who plays as a forward for Bognor Regis Town, on dual-registration from Southern League Premier Division South club Gosport Borough.

== Personal life ==
Abraham was born in London to Nigerian parents. He is the brother of fellow footballer Tammy Abraham.

== Career ==
=== Fulham ===
Born in London, Abraham started his career at Charlton Athletic's academy, before joining Fulham in 2017. Abraham featured for the under-21 team in the EFL Trophy, scoring two goals in five games.

Abraham joined Bristol Rovers on loan in January 2020 until the end of the 2019–20 season. He made his debut on 8 February 2020, and made a total of four appearances for the club, without scoring a goal.

On 16 October 2020, Abraham joined League One side Plymouth Argyle on loan until January 2021.

On 29 January 2021, Abraham joined Scottish Championship side Raith Rovers on loan until the end of the 2020–21 season.

In July 2021 Abraham joined League Two club Newport County on loan for the 2021–22 season. He made his debut for Newport on 7 August 2021 as a second-half substitute in the 1–0 League Two win against Oldham Athletic. Abraham scored his first goal for Newport on 10 August 2021 in the 1–0 EFL Cup first round win against Ipswich Town. He was released by Fulham at the end of the 2021–22 season.

=== Walsall ===
On 26 July 2022 he signed for Walsall. He moved on loan to Oldham Athletic in October 2022. Having scored once in eight appearances, on 28 December 2022 his loan was extended until the end of the season. He was released by Walsall at the end of the 2022–23 season.

=== Boreham Wood ===
On 1 July 2023 he signed for Boreham Wood.

On 8 December 2023, Abraham joined National League South club Maidstone United on a two-month loan deal.

=== Tonbridge Angels ===
On 16 August 2024, Abraham joined National League South side Tonbridge Angels. He departed the club in September 2024.

=== Gosport Borough ===
In September 2026, Abraham joined Southern League Premier Division South club Gosport Borough.

On 13 October 2026, he joined Isthmian League South Central Division club Bognor Regis Town on a dual-registration deal.

== Career statistics ==
As of end of 2024–25 season

Appearances and goals by club, season and competition
Club	Season	League			FA Cup		League Cup		Other		Total	
Club	Season	Division	Apps	Goals	Apps	Goals	Apps	Goals	Apps	Goals	Apps	Goals
Fulham U21	2018–19	—			—		—		3 (Note: Appearance(s) in EFL Trophy)	0	3	0
Fulham U21	2019–20	—			—		—		2	2	2	2
Fulham U21	2020–21	—			—		—		0	0	0	0
Fulham U21	Total				—		—		5	2	5	2
Fulham	2019–20	Championship	0	0	0	0	0	0	0	0	0	0
Fulham	2020–21	Premier League	0	0	0	0	0	0	0	0	0	0
Fulham	2021–22	Championship	0	0	0	0	0	0	0	0	0	0
Fulham	Total		0	0	0	0	0	0	0	0	0	0
Bristol Rovers (loan)	2019–20	League One	4	0	0	0	0	0	0	0	4	0
Plymouth Argyle (loan)	2020–21	League One	3	0	0	0	0	0	1	0	4	0
Raith Rovers (loan)	2020–21	Scottish Championship	7	0	1	0	0	0	—		8	0
Newport County (loan)	2021–22	League Two	12	0	0	0	2	1	3	2	17	3
Walsall	2022–23	League Two	8	0	0	0	2	1	2	0	12	1
Oldham Athletic (loan)	2022–23	National League	15	2	1	0	—		2 (Note: Appearance(s) in FA Trophy)	0	18	2
Boreham Wood	2023–24	National League	12	0	2	0	—		0	0	14	0
Maidstone United (loan)	2023–24	National League South	7	0	—		—		1	0	8	0
Tonbridge Angels	2024–25	National League South	3	1	0	0	—		0	0	3	1
Career total			71	3	4	0	4	2	14	4	93	9
