= Bradley Webb =

English footballer (born 2001)

Personal information
- Full name: Bradley James Webb
- Date of birth: 9 June 2001 (age 25)
- Place of birth: Hemel Hempstead, England
- Position: Left-back

Youth career
- 2017–2019: Bristol City

Senior career*
Years	Team	Apps	(Gls)
2019–2021	Bristol City	0	(0)
2019	→ Taunton Town (loan)	4	(0)
2019–2020	→ Yate Town (loan)	9	(1)
2020	→ Hungerford Town (loan)	10	(0)
2020–2021	→ Newport County (loan)	0	(0)
2021	→ Gloucester City (loan)	1	(0)
2021–2022	Aldershot Town	6	(0)
2022	→ Farnborough (loan)	3	(0)
2022	Hemel Hempstead Town	6	(0)
- * Club domestic league appearances and goals as of 23:00, 21 May 2023 (UTC)

Bradley James Webb (born 9 June 2001) is an English professional footballer who last played as a left-back for Hemel Hempstead Town.

== Career ==
Webb signed for Bristol City on scholarship terms at the end of the 2016–17 season, following a trial. During the 2019–20 season he spent loan spells at Taunton Town, Yate Town and Hungerford Town.

In September 2020 he moved on loan to Newport County for the 2020–21 season. Webb made his professional debut for Newport on 6 October 2020 in the starting line up for the 5-0 EFL Trophy defeat against Norwich City Under 21s. On 2 January 2021 his loan spell at Newport was ended. On 8 January he moved on loan to Gloucester City until the end of the 2020-21 season. On 9 February 2021, the loan was terminated and Webb returned to Bristol City.

On 4 December 2021, Webb signed for National League side Aldershot Town.

On 11 January 2022, Webb joined Southern League Premier Division South side Farnborough on loan. Webb was released in May 2022.

On 18 July 2022, Webb joined National League South club Hemel Hempstead Town.

== Career statistics ==
As of end of 2022–23 season

Appearances and goals by club, season and competition
Club	Season	League			FA Cup		EFL Cup		Other		Total	
Club	Season	Division	Apps	Goals	Apps	Goals	Apps	Goals	Apps	Goals	Apps	Goals
Bristol City	2019–20	Championship	0	0	0	0	0	0	—		0	0
Bristol City	2020–21	Championship	0	0	0	0	0	0	—		0	0
Bristol City	Total		0	0	0	0	0	0	—		0	0
Taunton Town (loan)	2019–20	Southern League; Premier Division South	4	0	1	0	—		—		5	0
Yate Town (loan)	2019–20	Southern League; Premier Division South	9	1	—		—		6 (Note: Four appearances and one goal in FA Trophy, two appearances in Southern League Cup)	1	15	2
Hungerford Town (loan)	2019–20	National League South	10	0	—		—		—		10	0
Newport County (loan)	2020–21	League Two	0	0	0	0	0	0	2 (Note: Appearances in EFL Trophy)	0	2	0
Gloucester City (loan)	2020–21	National League North	1	0	—		—		1 (Note: Appearance in FA Trophy)	0	2	0
Aldershot Town	2021–22	National League	6	0	0	0	—		1	0	7	0
Farnborough (loan)	2021–22	Southern League; Premier Division South	3	0	—		—		—		3	0
Hemel Hempstead Town	2022–23	National League South	6	0	0	0	—		0	0	6	0
Career total			39	1	1	0	0	0	10	1	50	2
