= Aneurin Livermore =

Welsh footballer

Personal information
- Full name: Aneurin Riley Livermore
- Date of birth: 18 January 2003 (age 23)
- Place of birth: Chepstow, Wales
- Position: Midfielder

Team information
- Current team: Merthyr Town

Youth career
- Newport County

Senior career*
Years	Team	Apps	(Gls)
2020–2022	Newport County	3	(0)
2023	Hereford	1	(0)
2023–	Merthyr Town	10	(0)
- * Club domestic league appearances and goals as of 22:51, 26 October 2023 (UTC)

Aneurin Riley Livermore (born 18 January 2003) is a Welsh footballer who plays as a midfielder for National League North club Merthyr Town.

== Career ==
He got his first start for Newport in the 3–1 EFL Trophy defeat to Plymouth Argyle. Livermore made his football league debut for Newport on 4 September 2021 as a second-half substitute in the 2-2 League Two draw against Leyton Orient. He was released by Newport at the end of the 2021–22 season.

On 25 February 2023, Livermore signed for National League North club Hereford but made only one appearance during remainder of the season. Livermore continued to train with Hereford after the season ended and featured a number of pre-season friendlies.

On 21 July 2023, Livermore signed for Southern League Premier Division South club Merthyr Town.

== International ==
On 29 September 2021 Livermore was called up to the Wales Under 19 squad for the 2022 UEFA European Under-19 Championship qualifying matches in Norway against Georgia, Norway and Kosovo on 6, 9 and 12 October 2021.

== Honours ==
Merthyr Town

- Southern League Premier Division South Champion: 2024-2025

== Career statistics ==
As of match played 24 October 2023

Appearances and goals by club, season and competition
Club	Season	League			FA Cup		League Cup		Other		Total	
Club	Season	Division	Apps	Goals	Apps	Goals	Apps	Goals	Apps	Goals	Apps	Goals
Newport County	2020–21	EFL League Two	0	0	0	0	0	0	1 (Note: Appearance(s) in EFL Trophy)	0	1	0
Newport County	2021–22	EFL League Two	3	0	0	0	1	0	2	0	6	0
Newport County	Total		3	0	0	0	1	0	3	0	7	0
Hereford	2022–23	National League North	1	0	—		—		—		1	0
Merthyr Town	2023–24	Southern League; Premier Division South	10	0	1	0	—		0	0	11	0
Career total			14	0	1	0	1	0	3	0	19	0
