= James Rowberry =

Welsh football coach and manager

Personal information
- Full name: James Rowberry
- Date of birth: 26 April 1985 (age 41)
- Place of birth: Newport, Wales

Team information
- Current team: Stoke City (assistant manager)

Youth career
- Years: Team
- Bristol City
- Newport County

Managerial career
- 2021–2022: Newport County

James Rowberry (born 26 April 1985) is a Welsh football manager and former player who is assistant manager of EFL Championship side Stoke City.

He began his coaching career at an early age, and at 29 years old became one of the youngest people to ever gain the UEFA Pro Licence. Rowberry was previously manager of Newport County, having been a youth coach at Newport and Cardiff City, where he was made first-team coach in 2014.

== Coaching career ==
Rowberry played youth football with Bristol City and Newport County, who he joined aged 16. His father Stephen played for Newport in the 1990s, and fellow Welsh manager Tony Pulis is a distant relative of Rowberry. He retired as a player aged 21, choosing to concentrate on his coaching career. He grew up a small distance from Rodney Parade, Newport's current stadium, and was the mascot of Newport aged five. Rowberry gained his UEFA Pro Licence in 2014 aged 29, making him one of the youngest people to complete the highest qualification badges in Europe. Upon gaining his badges, he was described as "one of the brightest young coaches coming through" by Football Association of Wales technical director Osian Roberts.

He joined Newport in 2009, working with the first team and development team, before moving to Cardiff City in 2013 to work with the club's academy. He also worked with the Welsh Football Trust as a football development officer, and later as a coach educator. Following the departure of Ole Gunnar Solskjær as Cardiff manager, Rowberry was made a first team coach under new manager Russell Slade, who described Rowberry as passionate and enthusiastic about coaching. When Slade himself left the job in 2016, Rowberry was among the candidates to take over the role. He would go on to work with Paul Trollope and Neil Warnock, and Rowberry says that he learned "pure coaching" from Slade and Trollope, while under Warnock he learned "pure management". He also credits Mick McCarthy with advising him on the role of being a manager prior to taking over at Newport.

On 19 October 2021, Rowberry was appointed manager of his hometown team, EFL League Two club Newport County, with the team 13th in the league after 13 matches of the 2021–22 season. He was given a contract until summer 2024, and took over from caretaker manager Wayne Hatswell, who had managed the club for four unbeaten league matches following the departure of manager Michael Flynn, with Rowberry saying he had "big shoes to fill" due to the success Flynn had at the club. Hatswell was retained as assistant manager, but resigned his position on 22 February 2022. On the same day, Cardiff coach Carl Serrant was appointed as assistant to Rowberry. Newport finished the season in 11th place in League Two. On 10 October 2022 Rowberry was sacked with Newport in 18th place in League Two after 13 league matches of the 2022–23 season. Serrant was also sacked and Sporting Director Darren Kelly took the role of Newport County caretaker manager.

In February 2023 Rowberry was appointed as FAW Head of Elite Coach Education. In February 2024 Rowberry was appointed assistant coach to the Wales national women's team. In August 2024 Rowberry was appointed as assistant coach to new Wales national team manager Craig Bellamy.

Rowberry Joined Stoke City on 1 January 2025 as assistant manager to Mark Robins. In August 2026, Rowberry left his part-time role with Wales to concentrated on his position at Stoke.

== Personal life ==
In August 2022, Rowberry revealed that he considered himself 'fortunate to be here' having had a pacemaker fitted following a routine check-up which led to him being diagnosed with third-degree atrioventricular heart block.

== Managerial statistics ==
As of 8 October 2022

Managerial record by team and tenure
Team	Nat	From	To	Record							
Team	Nat	From	To	G	W	D	L	GF	GA	GD	Win %
Newport County	(Wales)	19 October 2021	10 October 2022	52	21	9	22	69	65	+4	40.38
Total				52	21	9	22	69	65	+4	40.38
