= Carl Serrant =

English footballer and fitness coach

Personal information
- Date of birth: 12 September 1975 (age 51)
- Place of birth: Bradford, England
- Height: 5 ft 11 in (1.80 m)
- Position: Left back

Senior career*
| Years | Team | Apps | (Gls) |
| 1994–1998 | Oldham Athletic | 90 | (1) |
| 1998–2001 | Newcastle United | 6 | (0) |
| 1999 | → Bury (loan) | 15 | (0) |
| 2000 | → Sheffield United (loan) | 0 | (0) |
| 2001–2003 | Bradford Park Avenue | | |
| 2003–2005 | Droylsden | | |
| 2005–2007 | Farsley Celtic | | |
| Total | | 111 | (1) |

International career
| 1998 | England B | 1 | (0) |

Managerial career
- 2021–2022: Newport County (Assistant manager)
- * Club domestic league appearances and goals

Carl Serrant (born 12 September 1975) is an English football coach and former player, who is the first-team coach of EFL Championship club Huddersfield Town.

== Career ==
Born in Bradford, West Yorkshire, Serrant made more than 100 appearances as well as scoring a total of 2 career goals in the Football League with Oldham Athletic, Newcastle United, Bury as well as earning a cap for England B before his professional career was cut short by injury. He later returned to play in non-league for Bradford Park Avenue, Droylsden and Farsley Celtic. Whilst at Farsley he joined the coaching staff at Leeds United.

In November 2007 he joined Crystal Palace as a fitness coach. After less than a year with Palace, Serrant moved to Sheffield United as a strength conditioning coach. In 2017, he was appointed joint head of fitness and conditioning at Cardiff City.

On 22 February 2022 Serrant was appointed assistant manager to James Rowberry at Newport County. On 10 October 2022 Rowberry was sacked with Newport in 18th place in League two after 13 league matches of the 2022–23 season. Serrant was also sacked Newport's Sporting Director Darren Kelly took the role of caretaker manager.
