= David Longe-King =

English football player (born 1995)

Personal information
- Full name: David Enitan Damilola Longe-King
- Date of birth: 26 January 1995 (age 31)
- Place of birth: Brent, England
- Position: Defender

Team information
- Current team: Hemel Hempstead Town

Senior career*
Years	Team	Apps	(Gls)
2014	Colney Heath	7	(0)
2014–2016	St Albans City	5	(0)
2015	→ Northwood (loan)	1	(0)
2015	→ Dunstable Town (loan)	5	(0)
2015	→ Barton Rovers (loan)	3	(1)
2015	→ Ware (loan)	5	(1)
2016–2017	Dunstable Town	52	(3)
2017–2018	Ware		
2018–2019	Biggleswade Town	42	(4)
2019–2020	St Albans City	33	(1)
2020–2021	Newport County	11	(0)
2021–2022	Grimsby Town	5	(0)
2022	→ Woking (loan)	15	(1)
2022–2024	Dagenham & Redbridge	36	(0)
2024	→ Eastleigh (loan)	4	(0)
2024–2025	St Albans City	43	(3)
2025–2026	Chelmsford City	18	(1)
2026–2026	Hampton & Richmond Borough	15	(0)
2026–	Hemel Hempstead Town	8	(1)

International career^{‡}
2019	England C	1	(0)
- * Club domestic league appearances and goals as of 17:03, 22 January 2022 (UTC) ‡ National team caps and goals as of 18:00, 27 January 2026 (UTC)

David Enitan Damilola Longe-King (born 26 January 1995) is an English professional footballer who plays as a defender for Hemel Hempstead Town .

Longe-King began his playing career in Non-League football with Colney Heath before later having spells with Northwood, Barton Rovers, Dunstable Town and Ware. He notably spent two spells with St Albans City and earned a call up to the England C team whilst playing for Biggleswade Town. In 2020 he moved into professional football and joined EFL League Two side Newport County before signing with Grimsby Town in June 2021.

== Club career ==
Longe-King joined Newport County on a one-year contract on 20 August 2020 having left National League South team St Albans City at the end of the 2019–20 season. He made his professional debut for Newport in the 2–1 League Two win over Morecambe on 5 December 2020 as a second-half substitute. On 4 June 2021, it was announced that he would leave Newport County at the end of the season, following the expiry of his contract.

On 15 June 2021, Longe-King signed with Grimsby Town on a two-year deal.

On 21 January 2022, he joined Woking on loan for the remainder of the 2021–22 season, having struggled to hold a first team place at Blundell Park. On 18 April 2022 he scored his first Woking goal in a 4–1 away win against Dover Athletic. Longe-King played his last match for Woking on the last game of the season on the 15 May before returning to Grimsby having made 15 appearances for Woking and scoring one goal.

Grimsby secured promotion with victory in the play-off final, though Longe-King was not in the matchday squad at London Stadium.

On 7 July 2022, Grimsby announced they had agreed terms with Dagenham & Redbridge over the transfer of Longe-King.

On 1 February 2024, he signed on loan for fellow National League side Eastleigh on a one-month loan deal, in order to get some much needed playing time.

On 28 May 2025, after a season back at St Albans City, Longe-King signed for Chelmsford City.

On 27 January 2026, Longe-King joined Hampton & Richmond Borough.

On 7 June 2026, Longe-King signed a contract with Hemel Hempstead Town FC and made his first appearance in a 1-1 draw against Chelmsford City F.C.. He went on to score his first goal for the club in a 1-2 win against Salisbury F.C.

== International career ==
Longe-King represented England C against Estonia under-23's in June 2019.

== Career statistics ==
As of match played 13 April 2024

Appearances and goals by club, season and competition
Club	Season	League			FA Cup		League Cup		Other		Total	
Club	Season	Division	Apps	Goals	Apps	Goals	Apps	Goals	Apps	Goals	Apps	Goals
Colney Heath	2014–15	Spartan South Midlands League Premier Division	7	0	1	0	—		2 (Note: One appearance in the FA Vase, one in the Spartan South Midlands League Premier Division Cup)	0	10	0
St Albans City	2014–15	Conference South	0	0	0	0	—		0	0	0	0
St Albans City	2015–16	National League South	5	0	1	0	—		0	0	6	0
St Albans City	Total		5	0	1	0	—		0	0	6	0
Northwood (loan)	2014–15	Southern League Division One Central	1	0	—		—		—		1	0
Dunstable Town (loan)	2014–15	Southern League Premier Division	5	0	—		—		—		5	0
Barton Rovers (loan)	2015–16	Southern League Division One Central	3	1	—		—		0	0	3	1
Ware (loan)	2015–16	Southern League Division One Central	5	1	—		—		—		5	1
Dunstable Town	2015–16	Southern League Premier Division	12	1	—		—		—		12	1
Dunstable Town	2016–17	Southern League Premier Division	40	2	0	0	—		3 (Note: One appearance in the Southern League Cup, two in the FA Trophy)	0	43	2
Dunstable Town	Total		52	3	0	0	—		3	0	55	3
Barton Rovers	2017–18	Southern League Division One East	No data currently available									
Biggleswade Town	2018–19	Southern League Premier Division Central	No data currently available									
St Albans City	2019–20	National League South	33	1	3	0	—		1 (Note: Appearances in the FA Trophy)	0	37	1
Newport County	2020–21	League Two	11	0	1	0	—		0	0	12	0
Grimsby Town	2021–22	National League	5	0	2	1	—		1	0	8	1
Woking (loan)	2021–22	National League	15	1	—		—		—		15	1
Dagenham & Redbridge	2022–23	National League	24	0	0	0	—		1	0	25	0
Dagenham & Redbridge	2023–24	National League	12	0	0	0	—		0	0	12	0
Dagenham & Redbridge	Total		36	0	0	0	—		1	0	37	0
Eastleigh (loan)	2023–24	National League	4	0	—		—		—		4	0
Career total			182	7	8	0	0	0	8	0	198	7

== Honours ==
Grimsby Town

- National League play-off winners: 2022
