= Sonny Lewis =

Welsh footballer (born 2005)

Personal information
- Full name: Sonny Jay Lewis
- Date of birth: 29 March 2005 (age 21)
- Place of birth: Newport, Wales
- Height: 1.76 m (5 ft 9 in)
- Position: Midfielder

Team information
- Current team: Chepstow Town
- Number: 8

Youth career
- 2016–: Newport County

Senior career*
Years	Team	Apps	(Gls)
2020–2023	Newport County	0	(0)
2023–2025	Chepstow Town	54	(12)
2025–2026	Goytre	23	(2)
2026–	Chepstow Town	5	(1)

International career
2019	Wales U15	3	(0)
2021	Wales U17	0	(0)
- * Club domestic league appearances and goals as of 08:31, 12 October 2026 (UTC)

Sonny Jay Lewis (born 2 January 2005) is a Welsh footballer who plays as a midfielder for Chepstow Town.

== Professional career ==
Lewis joined the youth academy of Newport County as a Under 11. At the age of 15 he made his debut for Newport County on 8 September 2020 in the starting line up for the 1-0 EFL Trophy defeat to Cheltenham Town. In doing so he became the youngest player to represent Newport County, surpassing the record set by Regan Poole in 2014.

In July 2023 Lewis joined Chepstow Town.

In 2025 he joined Goytre and in 2026 returned to Chepstow Town.

== International career ==
Lewis first represented the Wales U15 in 2019. In August 2021 he was called up to the Wales under 17 team.
