= Louis Hall (footballer) =

English footballer

Personal information
- Full name: Louis Aiden Hall
- Date of birth: 23 May 1999 (age 27)
- Place of birth: West Bromwich, England
- Height: 1.74 m (5 ft 9 in)
- Position: Defender

Team information
- Current team: Kirivong Sok Sen Chey
- Number: 11

Youth career
- –2021: Aston Villa

Senior career*
| Years | Team | Apps | (Gls) |
| 2018 | Stourbridge | 1 | (0) |
| 2018–2019 | Bromsgrove Sporting | 2 | (0) |
| 2019–2020 | Bedford Town | 23 | (0) |
| 2020–2021 | Oxford City | 15 | (1) |
| 2021–2022 | Newport County | 0 | (0) |
| 2022 | → Gloucester City (loan) | 19 | (0) |
| 2022–2023 | Leamington | 40 | (2) |
| 2023–2024 | Banbury United | 26 | (0) |
| 2024 | Rushall Olympic | 2 | (0) |
| 2025 | Rushall Olympic | 4 | (0) |
| 2025–2026 | Bala Town | 31 | (0) |
| 2026– | Kirivong Sok Sen Chey | 7 | (3) |
- * Club domestic league appearances and goals as of 13:43, 9 November 2026 (UTC)

Louis Aiden Hall (born 23 May 1999) is an English professional footballer who plays as a defender for Kirivong Sok Sen Chey.

== Career ==
In October 2020, Hall made his debut for Oxford City against Bath City. His first goal for the club came in a FA Cup match over Weymouth on 24 October 2020.

In July 2021 Hall joined League Two Newport County on a one-year contract after impressing in pre-season trials. He made his debut for Newport on 10 August 2021 in the starting line-up for the 1–0 EFL Cup first round win against Ipswich Town.

On 25 January 2022, Hall joined National League North side Gloucester City on loan for the remainder of the 2021–22 season. He was released by Newport at the end of the 2021–22 season.

In August that year he joined Leamington. He made the bench for Leamington against Kidderminster Harriers on 13 August 2022 and his debut came three days later against Buxton on 16 August 2022. His first goal for Leamington came against Banbury United on 29 August 2022.

In August 2023, Hall joined National League North club Banbury United.

In March 2025, having missed much of the season through injury, Hall returned to Rushall Olympic following a short spell with the club at the end of the previous season.

In July 2025, Hall signed for Cymru Premier club Bala Town, making his league debut against Flint Town on 8 August 2025.

On 21 August 2026, Hall signed for Cambodian Premier League side Kirivong Sok Sen Chey.
