= Wayne Hatswell =

English football player and coach (born 1975)

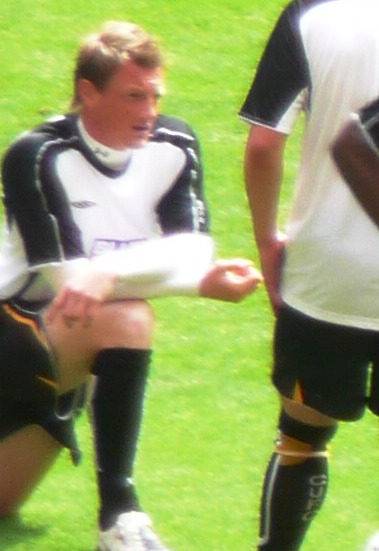
- Hatswell in 2008

Personal information
- Full name: Wayne Mervin Hatswell
- Date of birth: 8 February 1975 (age 51)
- Place of birth: Swindon, England
- Positions: Centre back; left back

Senior career*
Years	Team	Apps	(Gls)
1991–1995	Swindon Supermarine	30	
1996–1997	Witney Town	30	
1997–1999	Cinderford Town		
1999–2001	Forest Green Rovers	60	(7)
2001–2002	Oxford United	48	(0)
2002–2004	Chester City	39	(3)
2004–2006	Kidderminster Harriers	96	(5)
2006–2008	Rushden & Diamonds	75	(5)
2008–2010	Cambridge United	83	(8)
2010	Dundalk	34	(1)
2011–2012	Newport County	23	(2)
2012	Brackley Town	11	(0)
Total		499	(31)

International career
2008–????	England C	6	(0)

Managerial career
- 2013: Stamford
- 2021: Newport County (caretaker)
- 2024–2025: Wales U17
- * Club domestic league appearances and goals

Wayne Mervin Hatswell (born 8 February 1975) is an English former professional footballer who was most recently assistant manager of EFL League Two club Newport County.

== Playing career ==
Born in Swindon, Hatswell began his career with Swindon Supermarine and also played for Witney Town and Cinderford Town before joining Frank Gregan at Forest Green Rovers in 1999. During his first season at Forest Green, he made 34 league appearances, and two in the FA Cup scoring two goals. During his next season at Forest Green, he played a further 23 games, scoring five goals. At Forest Green, he became famous for scoring one of the worst ever own goals, when his attempted clearance went straight into his own net during an FA Cup match against Morecambe. The own goal became a favourite of former England striker and television presenter Gary Lineker who regularly featured the goal on BBC Match of the Day. However, Hatswell's form in the league was brilliant and earned him a move to Oxford United for £35,000. The move came on 1 December 2000, and at Oxford, he made 52 appearances, failing to score. At the end of the 2002 season, he moved to Chester City on a free transfer. He had a successful spell with Chester, playing 42 times and scoring three times in 17 months, before another move came. This time to Kidderminster Harriers for £8,000.

Within weeks of arriving at Aggborough manager Jan Molby made him the club captain, a role that he performed well. Following that award he was rewarded with a three-year contract but then in the year that Kidderminster got relegated he had a very poor season by his standards and was put on the transfer list. When he failed to find a new club during the close season he found he still had a job to do at the Harriers.

He eventually left the club in January 2006 in a cost-cutting exercise. He joined Rushden for an un-disclosed fee, believed to be about £10,000. He made his debut for Rushden & Diamonds in an away match against Stockport County. The match ended 2–2, but both teams needed a win as they were both threatened by relegation. He scored his first goal for Rushden in an away match at Bury, scoring a free kick from 40 yards out. He ended the season a regular at Rushden, but could not prevent their relegation from the Football League. He remained an active member of the first team during the 2006–07 season, his only goal coming against Stevenage Borough, for whom he scored an own goal during the same match. At the end of the season he was offered a new one-year contract, which he signed.

On 18 January 2008, he joined Cambridge United for £20,000.

In January 2010, he joined Dundalk as a player-coach. Dundalk manager Ian Foster commented on Hatswell's arrival to Dundalk saying; "Wayne is a player who leads by example both on and off the pitch. His leadership qualities are well recognised by the fact that he has been captain at most of his previous clubs. Wayne has operated coaching schools for Arsenal in his home town of Swindon, and has acquired all the necessary coaching badges. I expect Wayne to make a big impact at Dundalk both on the playing pitch and the training ground." Hatswell has been deployed mainly at left-back for Dundalk and his experience has been vital both on and off the pitch. On 2 July 2010, he scored in UEFA Europa League match against CS Grevenmacher of Luxembourg. Dundalk exited the Europa League qualifying at round two to an 8–0 aggregate defeat at the hands of Levski Sofia. Pride had somewhat been restored however as Dundalk suffered an unlucky 2–0 defeat in the return leg at Oriel Park on 22 July 2010 having lost 6–0 in Sofia in the first leg on 15 July 2010.

On 26 December 2010, Dundalk announced Hatswell had left the club by mutual consent and on 28 December 2010 Hatswell had joined Newport County in a player-coach role. He was a part of the Newport side that reached the 2012 FA Trophy Final at Wembley but left the club at the end of the season.

In the summer of 2012, Hatswell joined Conference North club Brackley Town but left before the turn of the year to try his hand at management. He also spent time with Cinderford Town when he left Forest Green Rovers

== Coaching and managerial career ==
On 3 January 2013, Hatswell was appointed as manager of Stamford of the Northern Premier League Division One South. Stamford won the 2012–13 playoff final earning promotion to the Northern Premier League Premier Division. Two weeks after winning promotion Hatswell resigned to take up a coaching position at newly promoted League Two club Newport County where he had been a player in the 2011–12 season.

On 7 February 2015, with Newport County in sixth place in League Two, manager Justin Edinburgh was appointed manager at League One Gillingham. Jimmy Dack stepped up to manager at Newport County assisted by Hatswell until the end of the 2014–15 season. Dack left Newport in April 2015 and Hatswell was subsequently released by the club in May 2015 following the appointment of Terry Butcher as team manager.

On 6 July 2015, Gillingham announced the appointment of Hatswell as the League One club's youth team manager, teaming up with Justin Edinburgh once again.

On 9 March 2017, Hatswell rejoined Newport County as Assistant Manager to Caretaker Manager Michael Flynn following the sacking of team manager Graham Westley. Flynn resigned after nine league matches of the 2021–22 season with Newport 15th in League Two with Hatswell appointed as Newport County caretaker manager. Hatswell managed Newport for four unbeaten League Two matches before the appointment of James Rowberry as Newport manager on 19 October 2021 with Newport 13th in League Two after 13 matches of the 2021–22 season. Hatswell was retained as assistant manager to Rowberry and he signed a contract extension in November 2021 until the end of the 2023–24 season. On 21 February 2022, Newport announced the departure of Hatswell after he had expressed a strong desire to pursue a new opportunity away from the club.

On 22 February 2022, Hatswell was appointed assistant head coach to Michael Flynn at Walsall. On 19 April 2023, Flynn and Hatswell were sacked with Walsall in 15th place after 42 games of the 2022-23 League 2 season.

On 8 May 2023, Michael Flynn was appointed manager of Swindon Town on a two-year contract and Wayne Hatswell was again appointed assistant manager to Flynn. On 15 January 2024, both he and Flynn departed the club, despite having signed a new long-term deal in November 2023.

In August 2024 Hatswell was appointed as head coach of the Wales under-17 team, under senior national team manager Craig Bellamy.

In May 2025, Hatswell returned to Newport County, being named assistant manager to the newly appointed David Hughes. On 15 November 2025, Hughes and Hatswell were sacked by Newport with the club bottom of League Two on 11 points after 16 league games of the 2025-26 season.

== Managerial statistics ==
As of match played 19 October 2021

Managerial record by team and tenure
Team	Nat	From	To	Record					Ref
Team	Nat	From	To	G	W	D	L	Win %	Ref
Stamford	(England)	3 January 2013	24 May 2013	22	11	4	7	50.00	
Newport County (caretaker)	(Wales)	1 October 2021	19 October 2021	5	1	3	1	20.00	
Total				27	12	7	8	44.44	—
