= Joe Woodiwiss =

Association football player

Personal information
- Full name: Joseph Michael Woodiwiss
- Date of birth: 10 November 2002 (age 23)
- Place of birth: Cardiff, Wales
- Position: Defender

Team information
- Current team: Caerau (Ely)
- Number: 4

Youth career
- –2019: Newport County

Senior career*
Years	Team	Apps	(Gls)
2019–2023	Newport County	0	(0)
2022	→ Merthyr Town (loan)	16	(0)
2022	→ Pontypridd United (loan)	8	(0)
2023–2024	Merthyr Town	0	(0)
2024–2026	Penybont	50	(0)
2026–	Caerau (Ely)	9	(0)
- * Club domestic league appearances and goals as of 09:22, 8 November 2026 (UTC)

Joseph Michael Woodiwiss (born 10 November 2002) is a professional footballer who plays as a defender for Cymru South club Caerau (Ely).

== Career ==
Woodiwiss is a product of the Newport County Academy. On 12 November 2019 Woodiwiss made his debut for Newport in the starting line up for the 7–4 win against Cheltenham Town in the EFL Trophy Southern Group E. In June 2021 he signed his first professional contract with Newport County.

On 14 January 2021 Woodiwiss joined Merthyr Town on loan for the remainder of the 2021-22 season. On 2 August 2022 he joined Pontypridd Town on loan until 3 January 2023.

He was released by Newport at the end of the 2022-23 season. On 7 July 2023 Joe re-signed for Merthyr Town for the 23/24 Southern League Premier Division South season.

On 26 June 2024, Woodiwiss joined Cymru Premier club Penybont.

In August 2026 he moved to Caerau (Ely).
