= Michael Flynn (footballer) =

Welsh association football player and manager (born 1980)

- Flynn in 2019

Personal information
- Full name: Michael John Samuel Flynn
- Date of birth: 17 October 1980 (age 46)
- Place of birth: Newport, Wales
- Position: Midfielder

Senior career*
Years	Team	Apps	(Gls)
1999–2000	Newport County	20	(4)
2000–2001	Barry Town	8	(12)
2000–2001	Newport County	3	(1)
2001–2002	Barry Town	12	(12)
2002–2005	Wigan Athletic	37	(2)
2004	→ Blackpool (loan)	6	(0)
2005–2007	Gillingham	97	(19)
2007–2008	Blackpool	26	(3)
2008–2009	Huddersfield Town	25	(4)
2008	→ Darlington (loan)	4	(0)
2009–2012	Bradford City	91	(10)
2012–2015	Newport County	82	(5)
2015–2017	Undy Athletic	4	(3)
2017–2018	Newport County	5	(0)
Total		420	(75)

Managerial career
- 2017–2021: Newport County
- 2022–2023: Walsall
- 2023–2024: Swindon Town
- 2024–2025: Cheltenham Town
- * Club domestic league appearances and goals

Michael John Samuel Flynn (born 17 October 1980) is a Welsh former professional football manager and former player who played as a midfielder. He was most recently the head coach of EFL League Two side Cheltenham Town.

Flynn began his career with Newport County, becoming a professional with Barry Town before his break out with Championship side Gillingham. He appeared 91 times for Bradford City. He returned to Newport County and played while obtaining his UEFA Pro License.

Flynn became caretaker manager of Newport County in 2017 amid a relegation battle. After 2017's 'Great Escape', Newport County won FA Cup fixtures against Leeds United, Leicester City and Middlesbrough. In the 2018–19 season Flynn led Newport to the 2019 EFL League Two play-off final against Tranmere Rovers. In cup competitions Newport also played Premier League teams in 2018 Tottenham Hotspur, in 2019 Manchester City and West Ham United. In the 2020–21 EFL Cup Newport beat Championship clubs Swansea City and Watford before losing on penalties to premier league club Newcastle United. In the same season Newport lost to Premier League club Brighton & Hove Albion on penalties in the FA Cup and again reached the League Two play-off final, losing to Morecambe 1–0.

== Playing career ==
Born in Newport, Wales, Flynn started his career playing for Newport County in 1999. A move to League of Wales club Barry Town beckoned in 2000. After forty goals in two seasons, including a goal in a 3–1 win over F.C. Porto in the second qualifying round of the Champions League, he moved to Wigan Athletic in the 2002–03 season.

Flynn spent a lot of his time on the substitutes' bench as Wigan won the Division Two title. He made seventeen appearances in the league, fourteen of which came from the bench, and scored one goal. The next season did not start any better for Flynn as he started just one game and made seven appearances from the bench before he was loaned to then League One side Blackpool, where he started six times in the league and once in the FA Cup before returning to Wigan.

In the January transfer window of that season, Flynn joined Championship strugglers Gillingham on a free transfer. Despite his instant success, and his three goals in sixteen starts, Gillingham were relegated to League One on the last day of the season.

Although injury affected his 2005–06 season, Flynn scored six goals. He took over as captain for the 2006–07 season and became top scorer with twelve goals.

It was announced on 8 May 2007 that Flynn had been offered a new contract with Gillingham. He chose not to sign, and left the club when his contract expired at the end of June 2007.

On 5 July 2007, Flynn signed a one-year contract with Blackpool, with an option for a further year. On 3 December 2007, Flynn scored his first goal for Blackpool in the club's 1–1 away draw against Scunthorpe United. On 7 May 2008 he was released by Blackpool. On 23 July 2008, he became Stan Ternent's fifth signing at League One side Huddersfield Town. He, along with five other players, made his Town debut in the 1–1 draw against Stockport County at the Galpharm Stadium on 9 August 2008. On 27 August he scored his first goal for Huddersfield in the second round of the League Cup against Sheffield United. Town went on to lose the game 2–1. His first league goals for Town came in the 3–2 win over Northampton Town at the Galpharm Stadium on 20 September 2008.

Following a short spell on the sidelines following a hamstring injury, he joined Darlington on loan on 27 November 2008. He made his debut in the 1–0 defeat to Morecambe at Christie Park on 13 December. He returned to Huddersfield on 29 December.

On 4 August 2009, Flynn joined local rivals Bradford City on a free transfer. He made his debut four days later in the 5–0 defeat by Notts County at Meadow Lane and scored his first goal of the 2011–12 season in a 3–2 loss to Leeds United. On 28 April 2012 it was announced that he would leave Bradford as his contract was ended by mutual consent along with teammates Chris Mitchell and Craig Fagan.

On 25 July 2012 he re-signed for home-town club Newport County. In the 2012–13 season he was part of the Newport team that finished 3rd in the league, reaching the Conference National playoffs. Newport County won the playoff final versus Wrexham at Wembley Stadium 2–0 to return to the Football League after a 25-year absence with promotion to Football League Two.

In May 2015 Flynn's playing contract came to an end and it was not extended by Newport.

In January 2017 whilst first team coach at Newport Flynn registered as a player. He made his fourth debut for Newport in the League Two match on 28 January 2017 versus Hartlepool United as a second-half substitute.

== Coaching career ==
He earned his UEFA Pro Licence at the same time as Mikel Arteta.

Flynn worked as academy manager for Newport County, before being released (as both player and coach) by Terry Butcher. In 2015 he then joined Welsh Football League Division Two side Undy Athletic as player-coach, intend to combine this part-time role with a job as an estate agent or a publican.

In August 2015, Newport County Supporters Trust took over interim control of the club, and appointed Flynn on a voluntary basis as club ambassador. He would later serve in other roles including marketing until October. On 8 October 2015 Flynn rejoined Newport County as first team coach under new manager John Sheridan. In January 2016 Warren Feeney was appointed team manager and Flynn was retained as first team coach. In July 2016 Newport County appointed Flynn to a newly created role as Football and Business Development Director. In October 2016 Flynn again rejoined the Newport County coaching staff under newly appointed manager Graham Westley.

== Managerial career ==
=== Newport County ===
On 9 March 2017 Flynn was appointed caretaker manager of Newport County for the remainder of the 2016–17 season following the sacking of Graham Westley with Newport 11 points adrift at the bottom of League Two. Flynn said his wife didn't want him to take the job. Wayne Hatswell returned to the club as Assistant Manager to Flynn. Flynn led the team to Football League survival, avoiding relegation with a win in the final match of the season and confirming the second 'great escape' in the club's history. On 9 May 2017 Flynn was appointed permanent team manager on a two-year contract.

On 7 January 2018 a 2–1 home win over Championship club Leeds United in the FA Cup third round meant Newport progressed to the FA Cup fourth round for the first time since 1979 and they were drawn at home to Premier League club Tottenham Hotspur. On 27 January 2018 Newport achieved a 1–1 draw to force a replay at Tottenham's temporary home ground of Wembley Stadium. Tottenham won the replay 2–0. In Flynn's first full season in management Newport County finished the 2017–18 season in 11th place in League Two.

The following season, Flynn led Newport to another major FA Cup upset, with a 2–1 victory over Premier League side Leicester City to send them through to the fourth round of the competition. In the FA Cup fourth round Newport drew the away match 1–1 against Championship club Middlesbrough on 26 January 2019 and on 5 February 2019 County won the replay at home 2–0. The match provided the only managerial meeting of Flynn and fellow Pillgwenlly-born manager Tony Pulis. Pulis spoke highly about Newport's achievement after previous turmoil, describing Flynn as having achieved a "fantastic job" and also praising Newport's team management consultant Lennie Lawrence.

County progressed to the FA Cup fifth round for the first time since 1949 and were drawn at home against reigning Premier League champions Manchester City. County lost the match 4–1. Before and after the match, Flynn received praise from a number of managers across the business, including his former UEFA pro-licence classmates Mikel Arteta and Thierry Henry, for progressing to the late stages of the competition. Flynn, a Liverpool fan, was also later invited by manager Jurgen Klopp to join a coaching session at Liverpool's Melwood ground.

Newport finished the 2018–19 season in seventh place in League Two, thus qualifying for the League Two play-offs. In the semi-final against Mansfield Town, Newport drew the first leg 1–1 at home, drew the second leg 0–0 at Mansfield and then won the semi-final penalty shoot-out. In the League Two play-off final at Wembley Stadium on 25 May 2019 Newport lost to Tranmere Rovers, 1–0 after a goal in the 119th minute.

On 27 August 2019, Newport County faced West Ham United of the Premier League in Round 2 of the EFL Cup, losing the tie 2–0. In September 2019, Flynn was closely linked with the team manager vacancy at Lincoln City following the departure of Danny Cowley. County went on to confirm they had granted permission to "another EFL club" to interview Flynn. On 17 September Flynn confirmed through a club press release that he was no longer in talks for the prospective role. In October 2019 he signed a new contract with Newport, until June 2022. Newport also reached the semi-final of the EFL Trophy, losing to Salford City on penalties on 19 February 2020. On 19 February 2020 Newport reached the semi-final of the EFL Trophy, losing to Salford City on penalties. The 2019–20 season was suspended on 13 March 2020 due to the COVID-19 pandemic in the United Kingdom, with Newport 15th in League Two and the season was formally terminated on 9 June 2020. Points per game was subsequently adopted to determine the final League Two table with Newport County rising one place to 14th in the league.

On 22 September 2020 Newport County beat Championship club Watford 3–1 at home in the third round of the EFL Cup to reach the fourth round for the first time in the club's history. Newport were drawn at home to Premier League club Newcastle United in the fourth round and after drawing 1–1 in normal time, Newcastle won the penalty shoot-out. Flynn won the League Two Manager of the Month award for October 2020 after Newport won six of their seven league games in October, leaving Newport top of the League Two table. Newport again reached the third round of the 2020–21 FA Cup to face Premier League club Brighton & Hove Albion at home on 10 January 2021. Newport lost to Brighton on penalties having drawn 1–1 after extra time. Newport finished the 2020–21 season in 5th place in League Two and qualified for the play-offs. In the semi-final against Forest Green Rovers, Newport won the first leg 2–0 at home and lost the second leg away 4–3, progressing to the final 5–4 on aggregate. In the League Two play-off final at Wembley Stadium on 31 May 2021 Newport lost 1–0 to Morecambe after a controversial 107th-minute penalty. On 7 June 2021 Darren Kelly was appointed as Newport County Sporting Director to work in conjunction with Michael Flynn who retained the team manager role.

On 25 August 2021 Newport County faced Southampton of the Premier League in the second round of the 2021–22 EFL Cup but they lost heavily 8–0. Flynn was unable to attend the match as he was isolating after testing positive for COVID-19. Flynn resigned on 1 October 2021 after nine league matches of the 2021–22 season with Newport 15th in League Two. Newport's assistant manager Wayne Hatswell was appointed as caretaker team manager. Hatswell managed Newport for four unbeaten League Two matches before the appointment of James Rowberry as Newport manager on 19 October 2021 with Newport 13th in League Two after 13 matches of the 2021–22 season. Hatswell was retained by Newport as assistant manager to Rowberry.

=== Walsall ===
On 15 February 2022, Flynn was appointed Head Coach of League Two side Walsall on a contract until 2024 with Walsall in 18th place in League Two. Flynn's first match in charge saw his new side travel away to Forest Green Rovers and defeat the league leaders 1–0, a George Miller goal ending the hosts' nineteen game unbeaten run. On 22 February 2022, Wayne Hatswell rejoined Flynn as assistant head coach. Walsall finished the 2021–22 season in 16th place in League Two.

Fourteen points from seven matches led to Flynn being awarded the League Two Manager of the Month award for October 2022 having guided Walsall up the table. On 19 April 2023, Flynn and Hatswell were sacked with Walsall in 15th place after 42 games of the 2022-23 League Two season.

=== Swindon Town ===
On 8 May 2023, Flynn was appointed manager of Swindon Town on a two-year contract, officially taking charge following the last match of the season that same day. Wayne Hatswell was appointed assistant manager to Flynn.

In November 2023, Flynn and Hatswell both signed contract extensions to keep them at the club until June 2026. On 15 January 2024, Flynn and Hatswell departed Swindon with the club in 15th position, having lost ten of their last 15 matches.

=== Cheltenham Town ===
On 31 May 2024, Flynn was appointed manager of EFL League Two side Cheltenham Town.

On 20 September 2025, Flynn was sacked following a 3–0 home defeat to Oldham Athletic that left the club sitting bottom of the league with just four points from nine matches.

== Personal life ==
Born in Newport, he was born to his mother Kerry and father John, both of Bettws. His mother had Michael at the age of 20 and he grew up with his great-aunt Sheila and great-uncle Ted on Baldwin Street in the Pillgwenlly area of Newport. His uncle worked at Newport Docks. Flynn has spoken of his uncle and aunt's Catholic values and its influence on his upbringing. He also described himself as a shy child, and a short but keen young footballer. He played for a range of youth sides including Albion Rovers Under 10s, Pill AFC, Newport Civil Service and Newport YMCA.

Flynn worked part-time jobs early in his career, stacking shelves while a youth player for Newport. He worked as a postman in 2001 prior to his first professional contract with Barry Town. Flynn married Victoria in 2016, and has five children; one daughter and two sons from previous relationships: Dionne (b. 2000), Charlie (b. 2014) and Theo (b. 2014) and two sons with Victoria: Edward (b. 2015) and Samuel (b. 2017).

Flynn went to St Joseph's High School as a child, where he was a schoolmate of former West Ham United player and Wales international James Collins, who is two years younger than Flynn. Flynn attended Staffordshire University obtaining a 2:1 degree in BA Sports Journalism and Media Law. Flynn holds a UEFA Pro Licence, which he obtained alongside Thierry Henry at the Football Association of Wales Dragon Park headquarters in 2013. He is a director of the Newport estate agent named Crook, Hudson & Flynn since 2014, and he was a director of estate agency David Spencer Limited until 2022.

In January 2026, Flynn became the first person since 2019 to be inducted into the Newport County Hall of Fame.

== Managerial statistics ==
As of 20 September 2025

Managerial record by team and tenure
Team	From	To	Record					Ref
Team	From	To	P	W	D	L	Win %	Ref
Newport County	9 March 2017	1 October 2021	250	102	65	83	40.8	
Walsall	15 February 2022	19 April 2023	68	21	22	25	30.9	
Swindon Town	8 May 2023	15 January 2024	33	9	9	15	27.3	
Cheltenham Town	31 May 2024	20 September 2025	68	25	13	30	36.8	
Total			419	157	109	153	37.5	

== Honours ==
=== Player ===
Wigan Athletic

- Football League Second Division: 2002–03

Newport County

- Conference Premier play-offs: 2013

=== Manager ===
Individual

- EFL League Two Manager of the Month: September 2018, April 2019, October 2020, October 2022
