= 2018–19 Newport County A.F.C. season =

Welsh association football club season

Newport County
2018–19 season
- Owner: Newport County AFC Supporters Trust
- Chairman: Gavin Foxall
- Manager: Michael Flynn
- Stadium: Rodney Parade
- League Two: 7th (play-off finalists)
- FA Cup: Fifth round
- EFL Cup: Second round
- EFL Trophy: Second round
- Top goalscorer: League: Pádraig Amond (15); All: Pádraig Amond (24)
- Highest home attendance: 9,680 v Manchester City (16 February 2019), FA Cup round 5
- Lowest home attendance: 962 v Plymouth Argyle (13 November 2018), EFL Trophy Southern Group C
- Average home league attendance: 3,409
| Home colours | Away colours | Third colours |

The 2018–19 season was Newport County's sixth consecutive season in Football League Two, 66th season in the Football League and 98th season of English league football overall. For this season the club kit was redesigned to match that worn during the 1938–39 Third Division South championship-winning season. County reached the League Two play-off final but narrowly missed out on promotion. They also reached the fifth round of the FA Cup for the first time since the 1948–49 season, losing to eventual winners Manchester City.

== Season Review ==
=== League ===
The season began with an away loss to Mansfield Town, leaving County in 23rd place in the league table. However, wins at home to Crewe Alexandra, Notts County and Grimsby Town, and an away 1–1 draw at Exeter City lifted Newport into the play-off places after five games had been played. The following two games away at Port Vale and Oldham Athletic were also won, further improving County's league placing to 2nd, missing out on the top spot on goal difference. In the next game, Newport suffered a surprising home six–nil loss to Yeovil Town, dropping to 3rd place, but still within the automatic promotion zone. After briefly rising to 2nd again following the home win against Cambridge United, County consolidated their position in 3rd place until the loss to Crawley Town put them back into the play-off zone. Following the home win over Colchester United Newport were again in 3rd place with 18 games played, but they slowly slipped down the table, falling as low as 15th after 33 games. However, after the loss away to Northampton Town in the 36th game, County spent the rest of the season unbeaten, rising up the table back into the last play-off spot. However, going into the last game, any one of Exeter, Colchester, Carlisle or Stevenage could overtake them and qualify for the play-offs. Whereas the others all needed wins, Exeter could mathematically qualify with a draw, due to their superior goal difference. Into the last three minutes of the final game, both Colchester and Stevenage were winning, Exeter were being held to a draw and Newport were losing at Morecambe. This left County in 11th place with the clock ticking towards full time. However, a Jamille Matt equaliser in the 87th minute lifted Newport back into 7th place at full time. Only Exeter could overtake County now, and as their match was still in progress it was several minutes before the league placings could be finalised. With Exeter failing to score, Newport were confirmed in the play-offs.

==== Play-offs ====
County's opponents were Mansfield Town, and they would be hoping for a better result than the season-opening's three–nil loss.

In the home leg, Newport found themselves one–nil down after 12 minutes, only for the top-scorer Pádraig Amond to equalise in the 83rd minute, leaving things all square for the away leg. At Field Mill both teams played out the entirety of the 90 minutes and 30 minutes of extra time without a goal being scored. This took the game to penalties, with County to kick first. Dan Butler scored for Newport, with Nicky Ajose restoring parity for the home side. Pádraig Amond for Newport and CJ Hamilton for Mansfield also scored. Mickey Demetriou scored for Newport, but Tyler Walker's penalty kick was saved by Joe Day. Next up for Mansfield was Mal Benning who had to score to keep his side in the game. His penalty initially hit the post before ricocheting off Joe Day and into the goal. Newport's next penalty kick was taken by Matty Dolan who made no mistake and booked County's place in the play-off final.

The final at Wembley was contested against Tranmere Rovers, who had been promoted to League Two in the previous season's National League play-off final. Much like County's previous game with Mansfield, this too lasted the full 90 minutes without a goal being scored. However, in the 89th minute Newport's captain Mark O'Brien was sent off for a second yellow card. This meant that County had to play the entirety of extra time with ten men. When it looked certain that this game would also go to penalties, Connor Jennings scored for Tranmere in the last minute of extra time to give them the win and promotion to League One.

=== Cup ===
County's FA Cup began with a trip to Southern League Metropolitan Police. Goals either side of half time by Pádraig Amond and Jamille Matt completed a comfortable 2–0 win for Newport. County were again drawn away in the second round, this time to National League side Wrexham. The game, broadcast on BT Sport, ended in a 0–0 draw, necessitating a reply at Rodney Parade. The draw for the third round had been made before the replay had taken place, with the winners rewarded with a home tie against 2015–16 Premier League champions Leicester City. Newport won the replay 4–0 and had still to concede a goal in the competition. In the third round, televised on the BBC, County took the lead against Leicester after just 10 minutes thanks to a Jamille Matt header. With the clock ticking down towards full time, Leicester's Rachid Ghezzal scored an equaliser in the 82nd minute. Newport had conceded an equaliser at exactly the same late stage in the previous season's fourth-round match with Tottenham Hotspur, but this time they found an even later winner. Leicester's Albrighton conceded a penalty for handball, which was duly converted by Amond, to put Newport into the fourth round for the second season in succession. In the fourth round, County were drawn away at Middlesbrough, in what was dubbed the Transporter Bridge Derby. At the Riverside, Daniel Ayala put Boro into the lead in the 51st minute and that is how the score remained at the 90th minute. Despite piling on the pressure in the last ten minutes, Newport could not find an equaliser, until former Boro academy player Matty Dolan scored in the fourth minute of stoppage time to force a replay. The draw for the fifth round had been made before the replay had taken place, with the winners rewarded with a home tie against Premier League champions Manchester City. The Middlesbrough replay, broadcast by BT Sport, was a completely different affair to the first game, with Newport running out comfortable 2–0 winners in a game they completely dominated. Manchester City had won both their previous FA Cup games 7–0 against Rotherham United and 5–0 against Burnley, but they found County a much sterner test. Newport kept the scoreline to 0–0 at half time, but shortly after the break Leroy Sané scored for the visitors, but their expected goal rush never materialised. It was not until the 75th minute that City scored their second through Phil Foden. Pádraig Amond got a goal back for County in the 88th minute, leaving the score 1–2 in the 89th minute. However, almost immediately Foden grabbed his second, with Riyad Mahrez scoring City's fourth in the fourth minute of stoppage time. Although County were out, Pádraig Amond, who had scored in all five rounds, remained the FA Cup top goalscorer until Manchester City's Gabriel Jesus scored twice in their record-equalling final to share the honour. Newport had lost just two of their last 12 FA Cup matches, each time to one of the Premier League's 'big six' sides.

In the EFL Cup, Newport were drawn away to Cambridge United in the first round. County cruised to a 4–0 lead by the 90th minute, only to be denied a clean sheet by an Ade Azeez penalty. In the second round, Newport were drawn at home to Oxford United, but failed in their attempt at the Oxbridge double, losing 3–0.

== Transfers ==
=== Transfers in ===
| Date from | Position | Nationality | Name | From | Fee | Ref. |
|---|---|---|---|---|---|---|
| 1 July 2018 | CM | (Wales) | Andrew Crofts | Scunthorpe United | Free | |
| 1 July 2018 | CB | (England) | Fraser Franks | Stevenage | Free | |
| 1 July 2018 | RB | (England) | Tyler Hornby-Forbes | Brighton & Hove Albion | Free | |
| 1 July 2018 | RW | (Guyana) | Keanu Marsh-Brown | Forest Green Rovers | Free | |
| 1 July 2018 | CF | (Jamaica) | Jamille Matt | Blackpool | Free | |
| 4 August 2018 | GK | (Antigua and Barbuda) | Nick Townsend | Free agent | Free | |
| 23 October 2018 | MF | (England) | Joss Labadie | Free agent | Free | |
| 31 January 2019 | RW | (England) | Ade Azeez | Cambridge United | Undisclosed | |
| 9 March 2019 | RW | (England) | Will Randall | Free agent | Free | |

=== Transfers out ===
| Date from | Position | Nationality | Name | To | Fee | Ref. |
|---|---|---|---|---|---|---|
| 2 July 2018 | LW | (England) | Lamar Reynolds | Dagenham & Redbridge | Free | |
| 21 March 2019 | CB | (England) | Fraser Franks | Retired | N/A | |
| 30 June 2019 | DF | (Wales) | David Pipe | Retired | N/A | |
| 30 June 2019 | CM | (Wales) | Andrew Crofts | Free agent | Released | |
| 30 June 2019 | RW | (England) | Will Randall | Free agent | Released | |
| 30 June 2019 | RB | (England) | Tyler Hornby-Forbes | Free agent | Released | |
| 30 June 2019 | MF | (Wales) | Tom Hillman | Free agent | Released | |
| 30 June 2019 | MF | (Wales) | Owen Taylor | Free agent | Released | |
| 30 June 2019 | DF | (England) | Dan Butler | Peterborough United | Free | |
| 30 June 2019 | GK | (England) | Joe Day | Cardiff City | Free | |

=== Loans in ===
| Date from | Position | Nationality | Name | From | Date until | Ref. |
|---|---|---|---|---|---|---|
| 1 July 2018 | CM | (England) | Charlie Cooper | Forest Green Rovers | 13 December 2018 | |
| 18 July 2018 | CF | (England) | Antoine Semenyo | Bristol City | 27 January 2019 | |
| 30 July 2018 | CM | (England) | Tyreeq Bakinson | Bristol City | End of Season | |
| 2 August 2018 | FW | (Wales) | Mark Harris | Cardiff City | 2 January 2019 | |
| 31 August 2018 | DF | (England) | Cameron Pring | Bristol City | 3 January 2019 | |
| 4 January 2019 | LB | (England) | Vashon Neufville | West Ham United | 3 April 2019 | |
| 18 January 2019 | CB | (Wales) | Regan Poole | Manchester United | End of Season | |
| 31 January 2019 | CF | (Northern Ireland) | Ben Kennedy | Stevenage | End of Season | |
| 31 January 2019 | CF | (England) | Harry McKirdy | Aston Villa | End of Season | |

=== Loans out ===
| Date from | Position | Nationality | Name | To | Date until | Ref. |
|---|---|---|---|---|---|---|
| 27 July 2018 | CF | (Wales) | Momodou Touray | Barry Town United | End of Season | |
| 10 January 2019 | CB | (Wales) | Jay Foulston | Merthyr Town | End of Season | |
| 27 March 2019 | RB | (England) | Tyler Hornby-Forbes | Salford City | End of Season | |

== Competitions ==
=== Pre-season friendlies ===
| 11 July 2018 Friendly | Bristol City | 2–2 | Newport County | Bristol |
| 19:30 BST (UTC+1) | Weimann 37'; Watkins 42' | Report | Amond 7'; Sheehan 10' |

| 13 July 2018 Friendly | Undy Athletic | 1–1 | Newport County | Chepstow |
| 18.45 BST (UTC+1) | Barnes 41' | Report | Trialist 76' | Stadium: Larkfield Park |

| 14 July 2018 Friendly | Chippenham Town | 1–0 | Newport County | Chippenham |
| 15:00 BST (UTC+1) | Compton 66' | Report | | Stadium: Hardenhuish Park; Attendance: 302 |

| 18 July 2018 Friendly | Swansea City | 1–0 | Newport County | Swansea |
| 15:00 BST (UTC+1) | Narsingh 13' | Report | | Stadium: Fairwood training ground |

| 18 July 2018 Friendly | Pen-y-Bont | 0–0 | Newport County | Bridgend |
| 19:00 BST (UTC+1) | | Report | | Stadium: KYMCO Stadium |

| 21 July 2018 Friendly | Hereford | 0–2 | Newport County | Hereford |
| 15:00 BST (UTC+1) | | Report | Semenyo 43' (pen.); Amond 90' | Stadium: Edgar Street |

| 28 July 2018 Friendly | Newport County | 1–3 | Stoke City Under 23 | Newport |
| 15:00 BST (UTC+1) | Amond 51' | Report | Jarvis 35'; Campbell 78', 80' | Stadium: Rodney Parade |

=== League Two ===
==== League table ====
| Pos | Team | Pld | W | D | L | GF | GA | GD | Pts | Promotion, qualification or relegation |
|---|---|---|---|---|---|---|---|---|---|---|
| 5 | Forest Green Rovers | 46 | 20 | 14 | 12 | 68 | 47 | +21 | 74 | Qualification for League Two play-offs (Note: Four teams play for one spot and promotion to EFL League One.) |
| 6 | Tranmere Rovers (O, P) | 46 | 20 | 13 | 13 | 63 | 50 | +13 | 73 | Qualification for League Two play-offs |
| 7 | Newport County | 46 | 20 | 11 | 15 | 59 | 59 | 0 | 71 | Qualification for League Two play-offs |
| 8 | Colchester United | 46 | 20 | 10 | 16 | 65 | 53 | +12 | 70 | |
| 9 | Exeter City | 46 | 19 | 13 | 14 | 60 | 49 | +11 | 70 | |

Source: EFL Official Website
Rules for classification: 1) Points; 2) Goal difference; 3) Number of goals scored; 4) Head-to-head results
(O) Play-off winners; (P) Promoted

==== Result summary ====
| Overall | | | | | | | | Home | | | | | | Away | | | | | |
| Pld | W | D | L | GF | GA | GD | Pts | W | D | L | GF | GA | GD | W | D | L | GF | GA | GD |
|---|---|---|---|---|---|---|---|---|---|---|---|---|---|---|---|---|---|---|---|
| 46 | 20 | 11 | 15 | 59 | 59 | 0 | 71 | 14 | 6 | 3 | 32 | 22 | +10 | 6 | 5 | 12 | 27 | 37 | −10 |

Last updated: 30 April 2019.
Source: Statto.com

==== Results by matchday ====
| Matchday | 1 | 2 | 3 | 4 | 5 | 6 | 7 | 8 | 9 | 10 | 11 | 12 | 13 | 14 | 15 | 16 | 17 | 18 | 19 | 20 | 21 | 22 | 23 | 24 | 25 | 26 | 27 | 28 | 29 | 30 | 31 | 32 | 33 | 34 | 35 | 36 | 37 | 38 | 39 | 40 | 41 | 42 | 43 | 44 | 45 | 46 |
|---|---|---|---|---|---|---|---|---|---|---|---|---|---|---|---|---|---|---|---|---|---|---|---|---|---|---|---|---|---|---|---|---|---|---|---|---|---|---|---|---|---|---|---|---|---|---|
| Ground | A | H | A | H | H | A | A | H | A | H | H | A | H | A | A | H | A | H | A | H | A | A | H | H | A | A | H | H | A | H | H | A | A | H | A | A | H | A | H | H | A | H | A | H | H | A |
| Result | L | W | D | W | W | W | W | L | W | W | D | D | W | L | D | D | L | W | L | W | L | L | L | D | L | L | W | D | L | W | L | W | L | W | L | L | W | W | D | D | W | W | D | W | W | D |
| Position | 23 | 16 | 18 | 8 | 5 | 2 | 2 | 3 | 3 | 2 | 3 | 3 | 3 | 4 | 4 | 4 | 6 | 3 | 5 | 4 | 6 | 8 | 11 | 10 | 12 | 13 | 13 | 13 | 14 | 13 | 15 | 15 | 15 | 12 | 12 | 13 | 11 | 11 | 13 | 13 | 12 | 11 | 11 | 11 | 7 | 7 |

Updated to match(es) played on 30 April 2019. Source: Statto.com
A = Away; H = Home; W = Win; D = Draw; L = Loss

==== Matches ====
On 21 June 2018, the League Two fixtures for the forthcoming season were announced.

| 4 August 2018 1 | Mansfield Town | 3–0 | Newport County | Mansfield |
| 15:00 BST (UTC+1) | Walker 12'; Khan 56', 64' | Report | | Stadium: Field Mill; Attendance: 4,423; Referee: Paul Marsden |

| 11 August 2018 2 | Newport County | 1–0 | Crewe Alexandra | Newport |
| 15:00 BST (UTC+1) | Amond 33' | Report | | Stadium: Rodney Parade; Attendance: 3,243; Referee: Brett Huxtable |

| 18 August 2018 3 | Exeter City | 1–1 | Newport County | Exeter |
| 15:00 BST (UTC+1) | Stockley 21' | Report | Harris 81' | Stadium: St James Park; Attendance: 4,239; Referee: Chris Sarginson |

| 21 August 2018 4 | Newport County | 3–2 | Notts County | Newport |
| 19:45 BST (UTC+1) | Franks 24'; Harris 26'; Matt 90+5' | Report | Hemmings 12'; Dennis 87' | Stadium: Rodney Parade; Attendance: 2,935; Referee: Alan Young |

| 25 August 2018 5 | Newport County | 1–0 | Grimsby Town | Newport |
| 15:00 BST (UTC+1) | Dolan 40' | Report | | Stadium: Rodney Parade; Attendance: 3,288; Referee: Neil Hair |

| 1 September 2018 6 | Port Vale | 1–2 | Newport County | Stoke-on-Trent |
| 15:00 BST (UTC+1) | Pope 27' | Report | Bennett 18'; Butler 48' | Stadium: Vale Park; Attendance: 4,485; Referee: Martin Coy |

| 8 September 2018 7 | Oldham Athletic | 0–1 | Newport County | Oldham |
| 15:00 BST (UTC+1) | | Report | Bakinson 69' | Stadium: Boundary Park; Attendance: 4,293; Referee: Mark Heywood |

| 15 September 2018 8 | Newport County | 0–6 | Yeovil Town | Newport |
| 15:00 BST (UTC+1) | | Report | Arquin 20'; Green 38', 48'; Jaiyesimi 45+2'; Olomola 68'; Dickinson 76' | Stadium: Rodney Parade; Attendance: 4,167; Referee: Peter Wright |

| 22 September 2018 9 | Tranmere Rovers | 0–1 | Newport County | Tranmere |
| 15:00 BST (UTC+1) | | Report | Franks 5' | Stadium: Prenton Park; Attendance: 5,745; Referee: Carl Boyeson |

| 29 September 2018 10 | Newport County | 4–2 | Cambridge United | Newport |
| 15:00 BST (UTC+1) | Demetriou 45+1' (pen.); Amond 49'; Matt 60', 63' | Report | Lambe 4', 21' | Stadium: Rodney Parade; Attendance: 3,104; Referee: Brett Huxtable |

| 2 October 2018 11 | Newport County | 3–3 | Macclesfield Town | Newport |
| 19:45 BST (UTC+1) | Butler 29'; Demetriou 59' (pen.); Matt 90+7' | Report | Kelleher 6'; Fitzpatrick 11' (pen.); Fitzpatrick 82' (pen.) | Stadium: Rodney Parade; Attendance: 2,624; Referee: Trevor Kettle |

| 6 October 2018 12 | Forest Green Rovers | 1–1 | Newport County | Nailsworth |
| 15:00 BST (UTC+1) | Bennett 18' (o.g.) | Report | Amond 38' | Stadium: The New Lawn; Attendance: 3,081; Referee: Tim Robinson |

| 13 October 2018 13 | Newport County | 2–1 | Stevenage | Newport |
| 15:00 BST (UTC+1) | Dolan 1'; Semenyo 90+8' | Report | Wildin 45+1' | Stadium: Rodney Parade; Attendance: 3,126; Referee: Keith Stroud |

| 20 October 2018 14 | Crawley Town | 4–1 | Newport County | Crawley |
| 15:00 BST (UTC+1) | Maguire 1'; Morais 64' (pen.); Palmer 72'; Nathaniel-George 79' | Report | Matt 59' | Stadium: Broadfield Stadium; Attendance: 2,157; Referee: Charles Breakspear |

| 23 October 2018 15 | Bury | 1–1 | Newport County | Bury |
| 19:45 BST (UTC+1) | Maynard 24' | Report | Matt 56' | Stadium: Gigg Lane; Attendance: 3,072; Referee: Martin Coy |

| 27 October 2018 16 | Newport County | 1–1 | Morecambe | Newport |
| 15:00 BST (UTC+1) | Amond 1' | Report | Ellison 77' | Stadium: Rodney Parade; Attendance: 3,206; Referee: Ollie Yates |

| 3 November 2018 17 | Carlisle United | 3–2 | Newport County | Carlisle |
| 15:00 UTC | Devitt 9', 12'; Grainger 90+2' | Report | Amond 39'; Butler 87' | Stadium: Brunton Park; Attendance: 3,541; Referee: Chris Sarginson |

| 17 November 2018 18 | Newport County | 2–0 | Colchester United | Newport |
| 15:00 UTC | Matt 54'; Pring 67' | Report | | Stadium: Rodney Parade; Attendance: 3,512; Referee: Roger East |

| 24 November 2018 19 | Cheltenham Town | 2–1 | Newport County | Cheltenham |
| 15:00 UTC | Boyle 18'; Barnett 44' | Report | Semenyo 89' | Stadium: Whaddon Road; Attendance: 3,672; Referee: Alan Young |

| 27 November 2018 20 | Newport County | 3–1 | Northampton Town | Newport |
| 19:45 UTC | Sheehan 5'; Matt 31'; Amond 33' | Report | Williams 33' | Stadium: Rodney Parade; Attendance: 2,730; Referee: Andy Davies |

| 8 December 2018 21 | Swindon Town | 2–1 | Newport County | Swindon |
| 15:00 UTC | Doughty 1'; Woolery 82' | Report | Amond 33' | Stadium: County Ground; Attendance: 6,204; Referee: Dean Whitestone |

| 22 December 2018 22 | Lincoln City | 3–2 | Newport County | Lincoln |
| 15:00 UTC | Akinde 3'; Anderson 7'; Pett 67' | Report | Amond 45', 77' | Stadium: Sincil Bank; Attendance: 8,632; Referee: Thomas Bramall |

| 26 December 2018 23 | Newport County | 1–4 | Forest Green Rovers | Newport |
| 15:00 UTC | Amond 45+2' (pen.) | Report | Williams 3', 52', 57'; Campbell 53' | Stadium: Rodney Parade; Attendance: 4,203; Referee: John Busby |

| 29 December 2018 24 | Newport County | 0–0 | Crawley Town | Newport |
| 15:00 UTC | | Report | | Stadium: Rodney Parade; Attendance: 3,166; Referee: Antony Coggins |

| 1 January 2019 25 | Stevenage | 1–0 | Newport County | Stevenage |
| 15:00 UTC | Revell 85' | Report | | Stadium: Broadhall Way; Attendance: 2,299; Referee: Andy Haines |

| 12 January 2019 26 | Crewe Alexandra | 3–2 | Newport County | Crewe |
| 15:00 UTC | Bowery 34'; Porter 88' (pen.); Ainley 90+2' | Report | Semenyo 65'; Amond 76' | Stadium: Gresty Road; Attendance: 3,104; Referee: Nick Kinseley |

| 19 January 2019 27 | Newport County | 1–0 | Exeter City | Newport |
| 15:00 UTC | Matt 71' | Report | | Stadium: Rodney Parade; Attendance: 3,791; Referee: Charles Breakspear |

| 29 January 2019 28 | Newport County | 0–0 | Port Vale | Newport |
| 19:45 UTC | | Report | | Stadium: Rodney Parade; Attendance: 2,534; Referee: Neil Hair |

| 2 February 2019 29 | Grimsby Town | 3–0 | Newport County | Cleethorpes |
| 15:00 UTC | Cook 17', 56'; Demetriou 84' (o.g.) | Report | | Stadium: Blundell Park; Attendance: 3,712; Referee: Anthony Backhouse |

| 9 February 2019 30 | Newport County | 1–0 | Mansfield Town | Newport |
| 15:00 UTC | Willmott 15' | Report | | Stadium: Rodney Parade; Attendance: 3,133; Referee: Graham Salisbury |

| 12 February 2019 31 | Newport County | 0–1 | Milton Keynes Dons | Newport |
| 19:45 UTC | | Report | Aneke 88' | Stadium: Rodney Parade; Attendance: 2,860; Referee: Kevin Johnson |

| 19 February 2019 32 | Notts County | 1–4 | Newport County | Nottingham |
| 19:45 UTC | Hemmings 10' | Report | Franks 9'; Matt 15', 33'; Amond 47' | Stadium: Meadow Lane; Attendance: 6,253; Referee: Simon Hooper |

| 23 February 2019 33 | Milton Keynes Dons | 2–0 | Newport County | Milton Keynes |
| 15:00 UTC | Cissé 57'; Aneke 89' | Report | | Stadium: Stadium MK; Attendance: 6,984; Referee: Seb Stockbridge |

| 2 March 2019 34 | Newport County | 2–0 | Carlisle United | Newport |
| 15:00 UTC | Azeez 14'; Amond 67' | Report | | Stadium: Rodney Parade; Attendance: 3,432; Referee: Ross Joyce |

| 9 March 2019 35 | Colchester United | 3–0 | Newport County | Colchester |
| 15:00 UTC | Szmodics 20'; Senior 45+2'; Nouble 63' | Report | | Stadium: Colchester Community Stadium; Attendance: 3,213; Referee: Lee Collins |

| 12 March 2019 36 | Northampton Town | 1–0 | Newport County | Northampton |
| 19:45 UTC | Powell 88' | Report | | Stadium: Sixfields Stadium; Attendance: 4,064; Referee: Antony Coggins |

| 15 March 2019 37 | Newport County | 1–0 | Cheltenham Town | Newport |
| 19:45 UTC | Hussey 54' (o.g.) | Report | | Stadium: Rodney Parade; Attendance: 3,192; Referee: Lee Swabey |

| 30 March 2019 38 | Yeovil Town | 1–3 | Newport County | Yeovil |
| 15:00 UTC | James 73' | Report | Willmott 62'; Kennedy 66'; Marsh-Brown 90+1' | Stadium: Huish Park; Attendance: 3,983; Referee: Nick Kinseley |

| 6 April 2019 39 | Newport County | 0–0 | Tranmere Rovers | Newport |
| 15:00 BST (UTC+1) | | Report | | Stadium: Rodney Parade; Attendance: 3,170; Referee: Alan Young |

| 9 April 2019 40 | Newport County | 0–0 | Swindon Town | Newport |
| 19:45 BST (UTC+1) | | Report | | Stadium: Rodney Parade; Attendance: 3,314; Referee: Kevin Johnson |

| 13 April 2019 41 | Cambridge United | 0–3 | Newport County | Cambridge |
| 15:00 BST (UTC+1) | | Report | Amond 4'; Matt 34'; McKirdy 90' | Stadium: Abbey Stadium; Attendance: 4,294; Referee: Ross Joyce |

| 19 April 2019 42 | Newport County | 3–1 | Bury | Newport |
| 15:00 BST (UTC+1) | Demetriou 5', 75'; Matt 35' | Report | Maynard 7' | Stadium: Rodney Parade; Attendance: 4,443; Referee: Peter Wright |

| 22 April 2019 43 | Macclesfield Town | 0–0 | Newport County | Macclesfield |
| 15:00 BST (UTC+1) | | Report | | Stadium: Moss Rose; Attendance: 2,269; Referee: Matt Donohue |

| 27 April 2019 44 | Newport County | 1–0 | Lincoln City | Newport |
| 15:00 BST (UTC+1) | Bennett 7' | Report | | Stadium: Rodney Parade; Attendance: 4,605; Referee: Kevin Johnson |

| 30 April 2019 45 | Newport County | 2–0 | Oldham Athletic | Newport |
| 19:45 BST (UTC+1) | O'Brien 48'; Willmott 79' | Report | | Stadium: Rodney Parade; Attendance: 4,642; Referee: Craig Hicks |

| 4 May 2019 46 | Morecambe | 1–1 | Newport County | Morecambe |
| 15:00 BST (UTC+1) | Collins 20' | Report | Matt 87' | Stadium: Globe Arena; Attendance: 2,776; Referee: Neil Hair |

==== Play-offs ====
| 9 May 2019 1st Leg | Newport County | 1–1 | Mansfield Town | Newport |
| 19:45 | Amond 83' | Report | Hamilton 12' | Stadium: Rodney Parade; Attendance: 6,035; Referee: Charles Breakspear |

| 12 May 2019 2nd Leg | Mansfield Town | 0–0 (a.e.t.) (1–1 agg.) (3–5 p) | Newport County | Mansfield |
| 18:00 BST (UTC+1) | | Report | | Stadium: Field Mill; Attendance: 7,361; Referee: Michael Salisbury |
| | Penalties |
| | Ajose (penalty scored); Hamilton (penalty scored); Walker (penalty missed); Benning (penalty scored) | | (penalty scored) Butler; (penalty scored) Amond; (penalty scored) Demetriou; (penalty scored) Poole; (penalty scored) Dolan |

| 25 May 2019 Final | Newport County | 0–1 (a.e.t.) | Tranmere Rovers | Wembley Stadium, London |
| 15:00 BST (UTC+1) | | Report | Jennings 119' | Attendance: 25,217; Referee: Ross Joyce |

=== FA Cup ===
The first round draw was made live on BBC by Dennis Wise and Dion Dublin on 22 October. The draw for the second round was made live on BBC and BT by Mark Schwarzer and Glenn Murray on 12 November. The third round draw was made live on BBC by Ruud Gullit and Paul Ince from Stamford Bridge on 3 December 2018. The fourth round draw was made live on BBC by Robbie Keane and Carl Ikeme from Wolverhampton on 7 January 2019. The fifth round draw was broadcast on 28 January 2019 live on BBC, Alex Scott and Ian Wright conducted the draw.

| 10 November 2018 Round 1 | Metropolitan Police | 0–2 | Newport County | Molesey |
| 15:00 UTC | | Report | Amond 41'; Matt 48' | Stadium: Imber Court; Attendance: 1,137; Referee: Matt Donohue |

| 1 December 2018 Round 2 | Wrexham | 0–0 | Newport County | Wrexham |
| 20:00 GMT | | | | Stadium: Racecourse Ground; Attendance: 5,295; Referee: Craig Hicks |

| 11 December 2018 Round 2 replay | Newport County | 4–0 | Wrexham | Newport |
| 19:45 UTC | Amond 49'; Matt 59'; Carrington 65' (o.g.); Butler 90+1' | Report | | Stadium: Rodney Parade; Attendance: 4,143; Referee: Kevin Johnson |

| 6 January 2019 Round 3 | Newport County | 2–1 | Leicester City | Newport |
| 16:30 UTC | Matt 10'; Amond 85' (pen.) | Report | Ghezzal 82' | Stadium: Rodney Parade; Attendance: 6,705; Referee: Chris Kavanagh |

| 26 January 2019 Round 4 | Middlesbrough | 1–1 | Newport County | Middlesbrough |
| 15:00 UTC | Ayala 51' | Report | Dolan 90+3' | Stadium: Riverside Stadium; Attendance: 15,794; Referee: John Brooks |

| 5 February 2019 Round 4 replay | Newport County | 2–0 | Middlesbrough | Newport |
| 19:45 UTC | Willmott 47'; Amond 67' | Report | | Stadium: Rodney Parade; Attendance: 6,552; Referee: Stuart Attwell |

| 16 February 2019 Round 5 | Newport County | 1–4 | Manchester City | Newport |
| 17:30 UTC | Amond 88' | Report | Sané 51'; Foden 75', 89'; Mahrez 90+4' | Stadium: Rodney Parade; Attendance: 9,680; Referee: Andre Marriner |

=== EFL Cup ===
On 15 June 2018, the draw for the first round was made in Vietnam. The second round draw was made from the Stadium of Light on 16 August.

| 14 August 2018 Round 1 | Cambridge United | 1–4 | Newport County | Cambridge |
| 19:45 BST (UTC+1) | Azeez 90' (pen.) | Report | Amond 18', 42'; Matt 49'; Semenyo 86' | Stadium: Abbey Stadium; Attendance: 1,618; Referee: Andy Davies |

| 28 August 2018 Round 2 | Newport County | 0–3 | Oxford United | Newport |
| 19:45 BST (UTC+1) | | Report | Demetriou 2' (o.g.); Baptiste 4'; Whyte 90+1' | Stadium: Rodney Parade; Attendance: 2,228; Referee: Scott Duncan |

=== EFL Trophy ===
On 13 July 2018, the initial group stage draw bar the Under 21 invited clubs was announced. The draw for the second round was made live on Talksport by Leon Britton and Steve Claridge on 16 November.

| Pos | Lge | Team | Pld | W | PW | PL | L | GF | GA | GD | Pts | Qualification |
|---|---|---|---|---|---|---|---|---|---|---|---|---|
| 1 | ACA | Chelsea U21 | 3 | 2 | 0 | 0 | 1 | 9 | 3 | +6 | 6 | Round 2 |
| 2 | L2 | Newport County | 3 | 2 | 0 | 0 | 1 | 5 | 1 | +4 | 6 | Round 2 |
| 3 | L2 | Swindon Town | 3 | 2 | 0 | 0 | 1 | 4 | 4 | 0 | 6 | |
| 4 | L1 | Plymouth Argyle | 3 | 0 | 0 | 0 | 3 | 0 | 10 | −10 | 0 | |

Source: EFL.com

| 11 September 2018 Southern Group C | Swindon Town | 1–0 | Newport County | Swindon |
| 19:30 BST (UTC+1) | Doughty 77' (pen.) | Report | | Stadium: County Ground; Attendance: 1,301; Referee: Antony Coggins |

| 25 September 2018 Southern Group C | Newport County | 3–0 | Chelsea Under 21s | Newport |
| 19:45 BST (UTC+1) | Matt 36', 46'; Semenyo 90+1' | Report | | Stadium: Rodney Parade; Attendance: 1,525; Referee: Kevin Johnson |

| 13 November 2018 Southern Group C | Newport County | 2–0 | Plymouth Argyle | Newport |
| 19:45 UTC | Semenyo 33'; Harris 45' | Report | | Stadium: Rodney Parade; Attendance: 962 |

| 4 December 2018 Round 2 | Cheltenham Town | 1–1 (7–6 p) | Newport County | Cheltenham |
| 19:45 UTC | Addai 68' | Report | Amond 18' | Stadium: Whaddon Road; Attendance: 739 |
| | Penalties |
| | Thomas (penalty scored); Forster (penalty scored); Tozer (penalty scored); Clements (penalty scored); Jones (penalty scored); Mooney (penalty scored); Field (penalty scored) | | Amond (penalty scored); Butler (penalty scored); Labadie (penalty scored); Sheehan (penalty scored); Semenyo (penalty scored); Demetriou (penalty scored); Harris (penalty missed) |

== Squad statistics ==
As of 13 September 2019

| No. | Pos | Nat | Player | Total | | League Two | | FA Cup | | League Cup | | League Trophy | |
| No. | Pos | Nat | Player | Apps | Goals | Apps | Goals | Apps | Goals | Apps | Goals | Apps | Goals |
|---|---|---|---|---|---|---|---|---|---|---|---|---|---|
| 1 | GK | (England) ENG | Joe Day | 52 | 0 | 46+0 | 0 | 6+0 | 0 | 0+0 | 0 | 0+0 | 0 |
| 2 | DF | (Wales) WAL | David Pipe | 26 | 0 | 16+3 | 0 | 3+2 | 0 | 0+0 | 0 | 1+1 | 0 |
| 3 | DF | (England) ENG | Dan Butler | 60 | 4 | 48+0 | 3 | 6+0 | 1 | 2+0 | 0 | 3+1 | 0 |
| 4 | MF | (England) ENG | Joss Labadie | 21 | 0 | 12+4 | 0 | 2+2 | 0 | 0+0 | 0 | 0+1 | 0 |
| 7 | MF | (England) ENG | Robbie Willmott | 43 | 3 | 32+2 | 2 | 5+1 | 1 | 0+0 | 0 | 3+0 | 0 |
| 8 | MF | (England) ENG | Matt Dolan | 42 | 3 | 27+8 | 2 | 3+3 | 1 | 1+0 | 0 | 0+0 | 0 |
| 9 | FW | (Republic of Ireland) IRL | Pádraig Amond | 59 | 23 | 46+2 | 15 | 7+0 | 5 | 1+1 | 2 | 1+1 | 1 |
| 10 | MF | (England) ENG | Keanu Marsh-Brown | 21 | 1 | 3+14 | 1 | 0+1 | 0 | 0+2 | 0 | 1+0 | 0 |
| 11 | FW | (Jamaica) JAM | Jamille Matt | 57 | 20 | 39+7 | 14 | 7+0 | 3 | 2+0 | 1 | 2+0 | 2 |
| 12 | FW | (England) ENG | Will Randall | 1 | 0 | 0+1 | 0 | 0+0 | 0 | 0+0 | 0 | 0+0 | 0 |
| 14 | MF | (England) ENG | Ade Azeez | 15 | 1 | 3+12 | 1 | 0+0 | 0 | 0+0 | 0 | 0+0 | 0 |
| 15 | MF | (England) ENG | Tyreeq Bakinson | 42 | 1 | 26+5 | 1 | 6+1 | 0 | 2+0 | 0 | 1+1 | 0 |
| 16 | MF | (Wales) WAL | Josh Sheehan | 46 | 1 | 24+12 | 1 | 2+2 | 0 | 1+1 | 0 | 3+1 | 0 |
| 17 | DF | (England) ENG | Scot Bennett | 50 | 2 | 39+2 | 2 | 5+0 | 0 | 2+0 | 0 | 2+0 | 0 |
| 18 | DF | (Wales) WAL | Jay Foulston | 2 | 0 | 0+0 | 0 | 0+0 | 0 | 0+0 | 0 | 2+0 | 0 |
| 19 | FW | (Northern Ireland) NIR | Ben Kennedy | 10 | 1 | 7+3 | 1 | 0+0 | 0 | 0+0 | 0 | 0+0 | 0 |
| 21 | DF | (England) ENG | Tyler Hornby-Forbes | 20 | 0 | 13+1 | 0 | 1+0 | 0 | 2+0 | 0 | 3+0 | 0 |
| 22 | MF | (Wales) WAL | Andrew Crofts | 12 | 0 | 5+5 | 0 | 1+0 | 0 | 1+0 | 0 | 0+0 | 0 |
| 25 | DF | (Republic of Ireland) IRL | Mark O'Brien | 46 | 2 | 29+8 | 2 | 4+2 | 0 | 0+0 | 0 | 3+0 | 0 |
| 26 | DF | (Wales) WAL | Regan Poole | 26 | 0 | 23+0 | 0 | 3+0 | 0 | 0+0 | 0 | 0+0 | 0 |
| 27 | FW | (England) ENG | Harry McKirdy | 13 | 1 | 2+11 | 1 | 0+0 | 0 | 0+0 | 0 | 0+0 | 0 |
| 28 | DF | (England) ENG | Mickey Demetriou | 58 | 4 | 48+0 | 4 | 7+0 | 0 | 2+0 | 0 | 0+1 | 0 |
| 30 | GK | (England) ENG | Nick Townsend | 10 | 0 | 3+0 | 0 | 1+0 | 0 | 2+0 | 0 | 4+0 | 0 |
| 31 | MF | (Wales) WAL | Tom Hillman | 1 | 0 | 0+0 | 0 | 0+0 | 0 | 0+0 | 0 | 0+1 | 0 |
| 32 | MF | (Wales) WAL | Owen Taylor | 1 | 0 | 0+0 | 0 | 0+0 | 0 | 0+0 | 0 | 0+1 | 0 |
| 38 | MF | (Wales) WAL | Lewis Collins | 1 | 0 | 0+0 | 0 | 0+0 | 0 | 0+0 | 0 | 1+0 | 0 |
Player(s) who have left the club during the season:
| 5 | DF | (England) ENG | Fraser Franks | 34 | 3 | 25+0 | 3 | 4+1 | 0 | 2+0 | 0 | 2+0 | 0 |
| 14 | FW | (Wales) WAL | Mark Harris | 20 | 3 | 5+11 | 2 | 0+1 | 0 | 0+0 | 0 | 3+0 | 1 |
| 20 | DF | (England) ENG | Cameron Pring | 11 | 1 | 1+6 | 1 | 0+1 | 0 | 0+0 | 0 | 3+0 | 0 |
| 33 | MF | (England) ENG | Charlie Cooper | 15 | 0 | 4+5 | 0 | 0+0 | 0 | 1+1 | 0 | 3+1 | 0 |
| 42 | FW | (England) ENG | Antoine Semenyo | 32 | 6 | 12+9 | 3 | 3+2 | 0 | 1+1 | 1 | 3+1 | 2 |
| 44 | DF | (England) ENG | Vashon Neufville | 2 | 0 | 1+0 | 0 | 1+0 | 0 | 0+0 | 0 | 0+0 | 0 |

=== Goals record ===
As of 13 September 2019

| Rank | No. | Nat. | Po. | Name | League Two | FA Cup | League Cup | League Trophy | Total |
|---|---|---|---|---|---|---|---|---|---|
| 1 | 9 | (Republic of Ireland) | CF | Pádraig Amond | 15 | 5 | 2 | 1 | 23 |
| 2 | 11 | (Jamaica) | CF | Jamille Matt | 14 | 3 | 1 | 2 | 20 |
| 3 | ~~42~~ | (England) | CF | Antoine Semenyo | 3 | 0 | 1 | 2 | 6 |
| 4 | 3 | (England) | LB | Dan Butler | 3 | 1 | 0 | 0 | 4 |
| 4 | 28 | (England) | CB | Mickey Demetriou | 4 | 0 | 0 | 0 | 4 |
| 6 | ~~5~~ | (England) | CB | Fraser Franks | 3 | 0 | 0 | 0 | 3 |
| 6 | 7 | (England) | RM | Robbie Willmott | 2 | 1 | 0 | 0 | 3 |
| 6 | 8 | (England) | CM | Matt Dolan | 2 | 1 | 0 | 0 | 3 |
| 6 | ~~14~~ | (Wales) | RW | Mark Harris | 2 | 0 | 0 | 1 | 3 |
| 10 | 17 | (England) | CB | Scot Bennett | 2 | 0 | 0 | 0 | 2 |
| 10 | 25 | (Republic of Ireland) | CB | Mark O'Brien | 2 | 0 | 0 | 0 | 2 |
| 12 | 10 | (England) | CM | Keanu Marsh-Brown | 1 | 0 | 0 | 0 | 1 |
| 12 | 14 | (England) | RW | Ade Azeez | 1 | 0 | 0 | 0 | 1 |
| 12 | 15 | (England) | CM | Tyreeq Bakinson | 1 | 0 | 0 | 0 | 1 |
| 12 | 16 | (Wales) | CM | Josh Sheehan | 1 | 0 | 0 | 0 | 1 |
| 12 | 19 | (Northern Ireland) | CF | Ben Kennedy | 1 | 0 | 0 | 0 | 1 |
| 12 | ~~20~~ | (England) | CB | Cameron Pring | 1 | 0 | 0 | 0 | 1 |
| 12 | 27 | (England) | CF | Harry McKirdy | 1 | 0 | 0 | 0 | 1 |
| Total | | | | | 59 | 11 | 4 | 6 | 80 |

=== Disciplinary record ===
As of 13 September 2019

| Rank | No. | Nat. | Po. | Name | League Two | | | FA Cup | | | League Cup | | | League Trophy | | | Total | | |
| Rank | No. | Nat. | Po. | Name | Booked | (yellow card) (yellow-red card) | Sent off (straight red) | Booked | (yellow card) (yellow-red card) | Sent off (straight red) | Booked | (yellow card) (yellow-red card) | Sent off (straight red) | Booked | (yellow card) (yellow-red card) | Sent off (straight red) | Booked | (yellow card) (yellow-red card) | Sent off (straight red) |
|---|---|---|---|---|---|---|---|---|---|---|---|---|---|---|---|---|---|---|---|
| 1 | 3 | (England) | LB | Dan Butler | 7 | 0 | 1 | 1 | 0 | 0 | 0 | 0 | 0 | 0 | 0 | 0 | 8 | 0 | 1 |
| 3 | 16 | (Wales) | CM | Josh Sheehan | 6 | 0 | 0 | 1 | 0 | 0 | 0 | 0 | 0 | 1 | 0 | 0 | 8 | 0 | 0 |
| 3 | 28 | (England) | CB | Mickey Demetriou | 7 | 0 | 0 | 1 | 0 | 0 | 0 | 0 | 0 | 0 | 0 | 0 | 8 | 0 | 0 |
| 5 | 4 | (England) | CM | Joss Labadie | 7 | 0 | 0 | 0 | 0 | 0 | 0 | 0 | 0 | 0 | 0 | 0 | 7 | 0 | 0 |
| 5 | ~~5~~ | (England) | CB | Fraser Franks | 5 | 0 | 1 | 0 | 0 | 0 | 1 | 0 | 0 | 0 | 0 | 0 | 6 | 0 | 1 |
| 5 | 25 | (Republic of Ireland) | CB | Mark O'Brien | 6 | 0 | 0 | 0 | 0 | 0 | 0 | 0 | 0 | 1 | 0 | 0 | 7 | 0 | 0 |
| 8 | 17 | (England) | CB | Scot Bennett | 6 | 0 | 0 | 0 | 0 | 0 | 0 | 0 | 0 | 0 | 0 | 0 | 6 | 0 | 0 |
| 9 | 11 | (Jamaica) | CF | Jamille Matt | 5 | 0 | 0 | 0 | 0 | 0 | 0 | 0 | 0 | 0 | 0 | 0 | 5 | 0 | 0 |
| 10 | 2 | (Wales) | RB | David Pipe | 3 | 0 | 0 | 1 | 0 | 0 | 0 | 0 | 0 | 0 | 0 | 0 | 4 | 0 | 0 |
| 10 | 26 | (Wales) | CB | Regan Poole | 4 | 0 | 0 | 0 | 0 | 0 | 0 | 0 | 0 | 0 | 0 | 0 | 4 | 0 | 0 |
| 12 | 7 | (England) | RM | Robbie Willmott | 2 | 0 | 1 | 0 | 0 | 0 | 0 | 0 | 0 | 0 | 0 | 0 | 2 | 0 | 1 |
| 12 | 9 | (Republic of Ireland) | CF | Pádraig Amond | 3 | 0 | 0 | 0 | 0 | 0 | 0 | 0 | 0 | 0 | 0 | 0 | 3 | 0 | 0 |
| 14 | ~~14~~ | (Wales) | RW | Mark Harris | 2 | 0 | 0 | 0 | 0 | 0 | 0 | 0 | 0 | 0 | 0 | 0 | 2 | 0 | 0 |
| 14 | 21 | (England) | RB | Tyler Hornby-Forbes | 2 | 0 | 0 | 0 | 0 | 0 | 0 | 0 | 0 | 0 | 0 | 0 | 2 | 0 | 0 |
| 14 | 22 | (Wales) | CM | Andrew Crofts | 2 | 0 | 0 | 0 | 0 | 0 | 0 | 0 | 0 | 0 | 0 | 0 | 2 | 0 | 0 |
| 14 | ~~33~~ | (England) | CM | Charlie Cooper | 1 | 0 | 0 | 0 | 0 | 0 | 1 | 0 | 0 | 0 | 0 | 0 | 2 | 0 | 0 |
| 14 | ~~42~~ | (England) | CF | Antoine Semenyo | 2 | 0 | 0 | 0 | 0 | 0 | 0 | 0 | 0 | 0 | 0 | 0 | 2 | 0 | 0 |
| 19 | 8 | (England) | CM | Matt Dolan | 1 | 0 | 0 | 0 | 0 | 0 | 0 | 0 | 0 | 0 | 0 | 0 | 1 | 0 | 0 |
| 19 | 14 | (England) | RW | Ade Azeez | 1 | 0 | 0 | 0 | 0 | 0 | 0 | 0 | 0 | 0 | 0 | 0 | 1 | 0 | 0 |
| 19 | 15 | (England) | CM | Tyreeq Bakinson | 1 | 0 | 0 | 0 | 0 | 0 | 0 | 0 | 0 | 0 | 0 | 0 | 1 | 0 | 0 |
| 19 | 19 | (Northern Ireland) | CF | Ben Kennedy | 1 | 0 | 0 | 0 | 0 | 0 | 0 | 0 | 0 | 0 | 0 | 0 | 1 | 0 | 0 |
| 19 | 27 | (England) | CF | Harry McKirdy | 1 | 0 | 0 | 0 | 0 | 0 | 0 | 0 | 0 | 0 | 0 | 0 | 1 | 0 | 0 |
| Total | | | | | 75 | 0 | 3 | 5 | 0 | 0 | 2 | 0 | 0 | 2 | 0 | 0 | 84 | 0 | 3 |
