= 2017–18 Newport County A.F.C. season =

Welsh association football club season

Newport County
2017–18 season
- Owner: Newport County AFC Supporters Trust
- Chairman: Malcolm Temple (until 30 September 2017) & Gavin Foxall
- Manager: Michael Flynn
- Stadium: Rodney Parade
- League Two: 11th
- FA Cup: Fourth round
- EFL Cup: Second round
- EFL Trophy: Southern Group E
- Top goalscorer: League: Pádraig Amond (13); All: Pádraig Amond (14)
- Highest home attendance: 9,836 v Tottenham Hotspur (27 January 2018) FA Cup round 4
- Lowest home attendance: 540 v Cheltenham Town (7 November 2017) EFL Trophy Southern Group E
- Average home league attendance: 3,489
Home colours	Away colours	Third colours

The 2017–18 season was Newport County's fifth consecutive season in Football League Two, 65th season in the Football League and 97th season of league football overall. They finished the season in 11th position in the league, and reached the fourth round of the FA Cup.

== Season Review ==
=== League ===
The season began with three away matches in succession, as the Rodney Parade pitch was being relaid. Following two draws with Stevenage and Crewe Alexandra County found themselves in 16th place in the embryonic league table, the lowest they would ever be. The first visit to Coventry City since August 1961 resulted in a 1–0 win. In the homecoming game against Chesterfield Newport won 4–1 thanks to a 13-minute Frank Nouble hat-trick and County were now in 2nd place. Over the next 11 games, Newport remained in and around the play-off positions, recording five wins and two draws. However, County failed to record a win in the next four games, falling out of the play-off zone and extending the run to six games without a win in total. After this slump, form improved following the away win at Swindon Town, with only one loss in the next nine games. This included a run of three consecutive wins in January, culminating with a 2–1 win over Crawley Town that put County back in the play-offs in 5th place. This was not to last, as Newport then went winless for the next seven league games before recording their second 2–0 win of the season over Yeovil Town. The last ten games of the season saw only three more County victories, resulting in an 11th-place finish, with doubles over Cambridge United and Swindon Town, and victory over promoted Accrington Stanley along the way. During the season Newport managed the double against Grimsby Town, Crawley Town, Yeovil Town, Swindon Town and Cambridge United.

=== Cup ===
In the EFL Cup, County were drawn at home to League One Southend United in the first round. However, the fixture was switched to Roots Hall as the Rodney Parade pitch was still being relaid. County came away with a 2–0 victory as a result of a second-half brace from Shawn McCoulsky and were rewarded with a home draw against Championship side Leeds United. This too had to be switched to the away ground as Rodney Parade was still not ready. Despite taking the lead at Elland Road, County eventually lost 5–1 and were eliminated.

Newport were placed in Southern Group E for the EFL Trophy, alongside Forest Green Rovers, Swansea City U21s and Cheltenham Town. Losing 2–0, 2–1 and 2–1 respectively, County finished bottom of the group and failed to qualify for the knockout stage.

In the FA Cup, County were drawn at home to League One Walsall in the first round. Despite a late Walsall goal, goals from Frank Nouble and Shawn McCoulsky were enough to see Newport into the hat for the second round. County were again drawn at home, this time to fellow League Two side Cambridge United. Goals from captain Joss Labadie in the 2nd and 82nd minute gave Newport a 2–0 victory and passage to the third round. County were drawn at home to Leeds United for the second time this season, and this time the game was played at Rodney Parade. Gaetano Berardi scored in the 9th minute for Leeds, but in the 76th minute, Conor Shaughnessy put the ball into his own net to level the scores. With the clock ticking down to one minute remaining, Shawn McCoulsky leapt highest from a corner to head the winner, putting County into the fourth round for the first time since the 1978–79 season. In the fourth round, County were again drawn at home, this time to Premier League Tottenham Hotspur. In front of a Rodney Parade record crowd, Newport took the lead in the 38th minute courtesy of a Padraig Amond goal. Into the last 10 minutes, County were looking like recording a famous victory, only for Harry Kane to poke home an equaliser from an 82nd-minute corner. In the resulting replay at Wembley, Dan Butler conceded an own goal in the 26th minute, with Spurs' Erik Lamela adding a second on 34 minutes. That was the final score, with the 7,200 County fans in the crowd of 38,947 left to applaud the County players back to the dressing room.

== Transfers ==
=== Transfers in ===
Date from	Position	Nationality	Name	From	Fee	Ref.
1 July 2017	AM	(England)	Matt Dolan	Yeovil Town	Free	
1 July 2017	CF	(England)	Frank Nouble	Southend United	Free	
1 July 2017	RB	(Wales)	David Pipe	Eastleigh	Free	
1 July 2017	CF	(England)	Lamar Reynolds	Brentwood Town	Free	
1 July 2017	AM	(England)	Robbie Willmott	Chelmsford City	Free	
23 August 2017	CF	(Republic of Ireland)	Pádraig Amond	Hartlepool United	Undisclosed	
17 October 2017	CF	(England)	Paul Hayes	Hemel Hempstead Town	Free	
5 January 2018	AM	(Wales)	Josh Sheehan	Swansea City	Free	
16 April 2018	CB	(Wales)	Jay Foulston	Youth system	—N/a	
16 April 2018	CF	(Wales)	Momodou Touray	Youth system	—N/a	

=== Transfers out ===
Date from	Position	Nationality	Name	To	Fee	Ref.
24 August 2017	FW	(Wales)	Rhys Kavanagh	Bristol Rovers	Compensation	
4 September 2017	GK	(Wales)	Rhys Davies	Leicester City	Undisclosed	
12 January 2018	CF	(England)	Aaron Williams	Free agent	Released	
5 February 2018	FW	(England)	Sean Rigg	Free agent	Released	
21 February 2018	DF	(England)	Jazzi Barnum-Bobb	Free agent	Released	
18 June 2018	CM	(England)	Tom Owen-Evans	Falkirk	Undisclosed	
30 June 2018	GK	(England)	James Bittner	Free agent	Released	
30 June 2018	CF	(England)	Paul Hayes	Free agent	Released	
30 June 2018	CF	(England)	Marlon Jackson	Free agent	Released	
30 June 2018	LW	(Antigua and Barbuda)	Calaum Jahraldo-Martin	Free agent	Released	
30 June 2018	CB	(England)	Jamie Turley	Free agent	Released	
30 June 2018	MF	(England)	Ben Tozer	Free agent	Released	
30 June 2018	CF	(England)	Frank Nouble	Free agent	Released	
30 June 2018	MF	(England)	Joss Labadie	Free agent	Released	

=== Loans in ===
Date from	Position	Nationality	Name	From	Date until	Ref.
28 July 2017	CF	(England)	Shawn McCoulsky	Bristol City	1 January 2018	
1 August 2017	CB	(England)	Ben White	Brighton & Hove Albion	30 June 2018	
10 August 2017	CM	(England)	Reece Cole	Brentford	29 September 2017	(Note: On 29 September 2017, Reece Cole's loan was cut short due to injury.)
18 August 2017	CF	(Republic of Ireland)	Joe Quigley	AFC Bournemouth	1 January 2018	
4 January 2018	CF	(Wales)	Aaron Collins	Wolverhampton Wanderers	End of season	
6 January 2018	FB	(England)	Tyler Reid	Swansea City	End of season	
18 January 2018	CM	(Republic of Ireland)	Emmanuel Osadebe	Cambridge United	23 March 2018	

=== Loans out ===
Date from	Position	Nationality	Name	To	Date until	Ref.
2 August 2017	CB	(England)	Jamie Turley	Boreham Wood	30 June 2018	
15 August 2017	CF	(England)	Aaron Williams	Brackley Town	2 January 2018	
18 August 2017	FW	(Wales)	Momodou Touray	Merthyr Town	1 November 2017	
8 November 2017	RB	(England)	Jazzi Barnum-Bobb	Torquay United	7 January 2018	
4 January 2018	CF	(England)	Lamar Reynolds	Leyton Orient	End of season	
4 January 2018	MF	(Wales)	Evan Press	Undy Athletic	End of season	
4 January 2018	MF	(Wales)	Tom Savigar	Port Talbot Town	End of season	
28 February 2018	MF	(England)	Tom Owen-Evans	Truro City	End of season	

== Competitions ==
=== Pre-season friendlies ===
Newport County announced eight pre-season friendlies.

14 July 2017	Undy	1–1	Newport County	Undy
19:00 BST (UTC+1)	Wood 56' (pen.)	Report	Bird 47'	Stadium: The Causeway

15 July 2017	Swindon Supermarine	3–4	Newport County	South Marston
15:00 BST (UTC+1)	Thompson; Bohane; Campbell	Report	Reynolds; Alexander (o.g.); Willmott; Jackson	Stadium: Webb's Wood Stadium

18 July 2017	Chippenham Town	1–2	Newport County	Chippenham
19:30 BST (UTC+1)	Sandell 60'	Report	Willmott 6'; Jackson 74'	Stadium: Hardenhuish Park

19 July 2017	Merthyr Town	1–1	Newport County	Merthyr Tydfil
19:30 BST (UTC+1)	Fleetwood 83' (pen.)	Report	Trialist 15'	Stadium: Penydarren Park

22 July 2017	Gloucester City	1–4	Newport County	Evesham
15:00 BST (UTC+1)	Moore		Nouble; Nouble; Dolan; Dolan	Stadium: Spiers and Hartwell Jubilee Stadium

25 July 2017	Barry Town United	2–0	Newport County	Barry
19:30 BST (UTC+1)	McLaggon 4', 22'	Report		Stadium: Jenner Park

29 July 2017	Northampton Town	2–1	Newport County	Northampton
15:00 BST (UTC+1)	Long; Barnett	Report	Reynolds	Stadium: Sixfields Stadium; Attendance: 1,346; Referee: Darren England

=== League Two ===
==== League table ====
Pos	Team	Pld	W	D	L	GF	GA	GD	Pts
9	Swindon Town	46	20	8	18	67	65	+2	68
10	Carlisle United	46	17	16	13	62	54	+8	67
11	Newport County	46	16	16	14	56	58	−2	64
12	Cambridge United	46	17	13	16	56	60	−4	64
13	Colchester United	46	16	14	16	53	52	+1	62

Source: BBC Sport
Rules for classification: 1) Points; 2) Goal difference; 3) Number of goals scored

==== Result summary ====
Overall								Home						Away					
Pld	W	D	L	GF	GA	GD	Pts	W	D	L	GF	GA	GD	W	D	L	GF	GA	GD
46	16	16	14	56	58	−2	64	9	10	4	32	24	+8	7	6	10	24	34	−10

Last updated: 23 January 2018..
Source: Statto.com

==== Results by matchday ====
Matchday	1	2	3	4	5	6	7	8	9	10	11	12	13	14	15	16	17	18	19	20	21	22	23	24	25	26	27	28	29	30	31	32	33	34	35	36	37	38	39	40	41	42	43	44	45	46
Ground	A	A	A	H	A	H	H	A	H	A	A	H	A	H	H	A	H	A	H	A	H	A	A	A	A	H	A	H	H	A	A	A	H	A	H	A	H	H	H	H	H	A	H	H	A	A
Result	D	D	W	W	L	D	W	L	W	W	L	W	W	L	D	L	D	D	L	W	D	W	D	L	D	W	W	W	D	L	L	L	D	D	D	W	D	L	D	L	W	L	W	W	L	D
Position	9	16	9	2	7	12	6	10	8	7	10	8	6	6	6	8	8	9	10	9	12	9	11	10	11	11	10	5	8	10	11	12	12	13	13	11	11	12	12	13	12	14	13	11	11	11

Updated to match(es) played on 23 January 2018. Source: Statto.com
A = Away; H = Home; W = Win; D = Draw; L = Loss

==== Fixtures ====
5 August 2017 1	Stevenage	3–3	Newport County	Stevenage
15:00 BST (UTC+1)	Pett 11'; Gorman 61' (pen.); Newton 72'	Report	Nouble 55'; Demetriou 77'; McCoulsky 90+4'	Stadium: Broadhall Way; Attendance: 2,650; Referee: Martin Coy

12 August 2017 2	Crewe Alexandra	1–1	Newport County	Crewe
15:00 BST (UTC+1)	Dagnall 18'	Report	Nouble 13'	Stadium: Gresty Road; Attendance: 3,400; Referee: Eddie Ilderton

19 August 2017 3	Coventry City	0–1	Newport County	Coventry
15:00 BST (UTC+1)		Report	Cole 53'	Stadium: Ricoh Arena; Attendance: 8,745; Referee: Paul Tierney

26 August 2017 4	Newport County	4–1	Chesterfield	Newport
15:00 BST (UTC+1)	Nouble 55', 66', 68'; Amond 82'	Report	O'Grady 37'	Stadium: Rodney Parade; Attendance: 4,332; Referee: David Webb

2 September 2017 5	Exeter City	1–0	Newport County	Exeter
15:00 BST (UTC+1)	Holmes 57'	Report		Stadium: St James Park; Attendance: 4,193; Referee: John Brooks

9 September 2017 6	Newport County	0–0	Wycombe Wanderers	Newport
15:00 BST (UTC+1)		Report		Stadium: Rodney Parade; Attendance: 3,752; Referee: Ben Toner

12 September 2017 7	Newport County	1–0	Cheltenham Town	Newport
19:45 BST (UTC+1)	Amond 35'	Report		Stadium: Rodney Parade; Attendance: 2,916; Referee: Gavin Ward

16 September 2017 8	Morecambe	2–1	Newport County	Morecambe
15:00 BST (UTC+1)	Ellison 34', 80'	Report	Bennett 36'	Stadium: Globe Arena; Attendance: 1,189; Referee: Darren Drysdale

23 September 2017 9	Newport County	1–0	Grimsby Town	Newport
15:00 BST (UTC+1)	Amond 63'	Report		Stadium: Rodney Parade; Attendance: 3,356; Referee: Antony Coggins

26 September 2017 10	Crawley Town	1–2	Newport County	Crawley
19:45 BST (UTC+1)	Connolly 30'	Report	Demetriou 40', 51'	Stadium: Broadfield Stadium; Attendance: 1,455; Referee: Craig Hicks

30 September 2017 11	Luton Town	3–1	Newport County	Luton
15:00 BST (UTC+1)	Sheehan 12'; Hylton 22' (pen.); Hylton 35'	Report	Labadie 55'	Stadium: Kenilworth Road; Attendance: 7,681; Referee: Mark Heywood

7 October 2017 12	Newport County	2–0	Yeovil Town	Newport
15:00 BST (UTC+1)	Amond 45'; Labadie 55'	Report		Stadium: Rodney Parade; Attendance: 3,689; Referee: Nick Kinseley

14 October 2017 13	Forest Green Rovers	0–4	Newport County	Nailsworth
15:00 BST (UTC+1)		Report	Amond 14', 41'; Bennett 78'; McCoulsky 86'	Stadium: The New Lawn; Attendance: 2,864; Referee: Carl Boyeson

17 October 2017 14	Newport County	1–2	Colchester United	Newport
19:45 BST (UTC+1)	McCoulsky 86'	Report	Jackson 72'; Mandron 77'	Stadium: Rodney Parade; Attendance: 2,704; Referee: Darren England

21 October 2017 15	Newport County	1–1	Mansfield Town	Newport
15:00 BST (UTC+1)	McCoulsky 69'	Report	Rose 22'	Stadium: Rodney Parade; Attendance: 3,146; Referee: Charles Breakspear

28 October 2017 16	Notts County	3–0	Newport County	Nottingham
15:00 BST (UTC+1)	Grant 36', 55'; Ameobi 52'	Report		Stadium: Meadow Lane; Attendance: 6,019; Referee: Craig Hicks

10 November 2017 17	Newport County	1–1	Port Vale	Newport
19:45 UTC	Dolan 54'	Report	Forrester 80'	Stadium: Rodney Parade; Attendance: 2,876; Referee: John Busby

18 November 2017 18	Accrington Stanley	1–1	Newport County	Accrington
15:00 UTC	Wilks 88'	Report	Nouble 48'	Stadium: Crown Ground; Attendance: 1,371; Referee: Darren Drysdale

21 November 2017 19	Newport County	1–2	Barnet	Newport
19:45 UTC	White 73'	Report	Akinde 88'; Coulthirst 90'	Stadium: Rodney Parade; Attendance: 2,275; Referee: Michael Salisbury

25 November 2017 20	Swindon Town	0–1	Newport County	Swindon
15:00 UTC		Report	Tozer 76'	Stadium: County Ground; Attendance: 6,764; Referee: James Linington

9 December 2017 21	Newport County	3–3	Carlisle United	Newport
15:00 UTC	McCoulsky 43'; Dolan 56', 69'	Report	Joyce 46'; Etuhu 52'; Miller 62'	Stadium: Rodney Parade; Attendance: 3,176; Referee: Lee Swabey

16 December 2017 22	Cambridge United	1–2	Newport County	Cambridge
15:00 UTC	Brown 72'	Report	McCoulsky 46'; Labadie 90+4'	Stadium: Abbey Stadium; Attendance: 3,632; Referee: Chris Sarginson

23 December 2017 23	Newport County	0–0	Lincoln City	Newport
15:00 UTC		Report		Stadium: Rodney Parade; Attendance: 3,514; Referee: Brett Huxtable

26 December 2017 24	Wycombe Wanderers	2–0	Newport County	High Wycombe
15:00 UTC	Tyson 15'; Akinfenwa 78'	Report		Stadium: Adams Park; Attendance: 4,629; Referee: Charles Breakspear

30 December 2017 25	Cheltenham Town	1–1	Newport County	Cheltenham
15:00 UTC	Eisa 77'	Report	Amond 55'	Stadium: Whaddon Road; Attendance: 3,637; Referee: Antony Coggins

1 January 2018 26	Newport County	2–1	Exeter City	Newport
15:00 UTC	Amond 6'; Willmott 66'	Report	Stockley 52'	Stadium: Rodney Parade; Attendance: 3,318; Referee: Graham Horwood

13 January 2018 27	Grimsby Town	1–2	Newport County	Cleethorpes
15:00 UTC	Matt 80'	Report	Willmott 19'; Nouble 56'	Stadium: Blundell Park; Attendance: 3,397; Referee: Graham Salisbury

19 January 2018 28	Newport County	2–1	Crawley Town	Newport
19:45 UTC	Amond 40'; Demetriou 44' (pen.)	Report	Smith 48'	Stadium: Rodney Parade; Attendance: 5,741; Referee: Simon Hooper

23 January 2018 29	Newport County	1–1	Morecambe	Newport
19:45 UTC	Tozer 14'	Report	Rose 77' (pen.)	Stadium: Rodney Parade; Attendance: 2,754; Referee: Kevin Johnson

30 January 2018 30	Lincoln City	3–1	Newport County	Lincoln
19:45 UTC	Rhead 13'; Green 51'; Palmer 73'	Report	Amond 32'	Stadium: Sincil Bank; Attendance: 7,567; Referee: Scott Oldham

3 February 2018 31	Colchester United	2–0	Newport County	Colchester
15:00 UTC	Stevenson 59'; Eastman 80'	Report		Stadium: Colchester Community Stadium; Attendance: 2,874; Referee: Gavin Ward

13 February 2018 32	Mansfield Town	5–0	Newport County	Mansfield
19:45 UTC	Rose 6'; Potter 9', 28', 61'; MacDonald 34'	Report		Stadium: Field Mill; Attendance: 2,866; Referee: Ben Toner

17 February 2018 33	Newport County	0–0	Notts County	Newport
15:00 UTC		Report		Stadium: Rodney Parade; Attendance: 3,326; Referee: Robert Lewis

24 February 2018 34	Port Vale	0–0	Newport County	Stoke-on-Trent
15:00 UTC		Report		Stadium: Vale Park; Attendance: 4,013; Referee: Tom Nield

6 March 2018 35	Newport County	3–3	Forest Green Rovers	Newport
19:45 UTC	Butler 9'; Hayes 17', 38'	Report	Butler 6' (o.g.); Gunning 30'; Collins 82'	Stadium: Rodney Parade; Attendance: 2,862; Referee: Chris Sarginson

10 March 2018 36	Yeovil Town	0–2	Newport County	Yeovil
15:00 UTC		Report	Sheehan 57'; Hayes 90+4'	Stadium: Huish Park; Attendance: 2,880; Referee: Lee Collins

17 March 2018 37	Newport County	1–1	Luton Town	Newport
15:00 UTC	Sheehan 2'	Report	Potts 23'	Stadium: Rodney Parade; Attendance: 3,512; Referee: Craig Hicks

24 March 2018 38	Newport County	1–2	Crewe Alexandra	Newport
15:00 UTC	Demetriou 81'	Report	McKirdy 26'; Bowery 60'	Stadium: Rodney Parade; Attendance: 4,638; Referee: Darren Handley

30 March 2018 39	Newport County	1–1	Coventry City	Newport
15:00 BST (UTC+1)	Demetriou 40'	Report	Biamou 79'	Stadium: Rodney Parade; Attendance: 4,667; Referee: Dean Whitestone

7 April 2018 40	Newport County	0–1	Stevenage	Newport
15:00 BST (UTC+1)		Report	Whelpdale 43'	Stadium: Rodney Parade; Attendance: 4,007; Referee: Ollie Yates

14 April 2018 41	Newport County	2–1	Swindon Town	Newport
15:00 BST (UTC+1)	Amond 15'; Tozer 35'	Report	Mullin 62'	Stadium: Rodney Parade; Attendance: 3,911; Referee: Charles Breakspear

21 April 2018 42	Barnet	2–0	Newport County	Edgware
15:00 BST (UTC+1)	Coulthirst 10'; Santos 82'	Report		Stadium: The Hive Stadium; Attendance: 1,816; Referee: Robert Lewis

24 April 2018 43	Newport County	2–1	Accrington Stanley	Newport
19:45 BST (UTC+1)	Amond 30'; Nouble 85'	Report	Kee 90'	Stadium: Rodney Parade; Attendance: 2,370; Referee: Lee Swabey

28 April 2018 44	Newport County	2–1	Cambridge United	Newport
15:00 BST (UTC+1)	Demetriou 26'; Nouble 59'	Report	Maris 81'	Stadium: Rodney Parade; Attendance: 3,412; Referee: Graham Salisbury

1 May 2018 45	Chesterfield	1–0	Newport County	Chesterfield
19:45 BST (UTC+1)	Dennis 71'	Report		Stadium: Proact Stadium; Attendance: 4,608; Referee: Gavin Ward

5 May 2018 46	Carlisle United	1–1	Newport County	Carlisle
15:00 BST (UTC+1)	Ellis 38'	Report	Amond 38'	Stadium: Brunton Park; Attendance: 5,311; Referee: Mark Heywood

=== EFL Cup ===
8 August 2017 Round 1	Southend United	0–2	Newport County	Southend-on-Sea
19:45 BST (UTC+1)		Report	McCoulsky 52', 58'	Stadium: Roots Hall; Attendance: 2,998; Referee: Antony Coggins

22 August 2017 Round 2	Leeds United	5–1	Newport County	Leeds
19:45 BST (UTC+1)	Roofe 44', 49', 65'; Sáiz 78'; Viera 89'	Report	Labadie 33'	Stadium: Elland Road; Attendance: 17,098; Referee: Ross Joyce

=== EFL Trophy ===
Pos	Lge	Team	Pld	W	PW	PL	L	GF	GA	GD	Pts	Qualification
1	ACA	Swansea City U21 (Q)	3	3	0	0	0	6	2	+4	9	Round 2
2	L2	Forest Green Rovers (Q)	3	2	0	0	1	4	3	+1	6	Round 2
3	L2	Cheltenham Town (E)	3	1	0	0	2	4	5	−1	3	
4	L2	Newport County (E)	3	0	0	0	3	2	6	−4	0	

Updated to match(es) played on 7 November 2017. Source: EFL.com
(E) Eliminated; (Q) Qualified to the phase indicated

29 August 2017 Southern Group E	Forest Green Rovers	2–0	Newport County	Nailsworth
19:30 BST (UTC+1)	Wishart 20'; James 84'	Report		Stadium: The New Lawn; Attendance: 1,090

3 October 2017 Southern Group E	Newport County	1–2	Swansea City U21s	Newport
19:45 BST (UTC+1)	McCoulsky 76'	Report	Gorré 70'; Foulston 83' (o.g.)	Stadium: Rodney Parade; Attendance: 750; Referee: Brett Huxtable

7 November 2017 Southern Group E	Newport County	1–2	Cheltenham Town	Newport
19:30 UTC	Reynolds 48'	Report	Graham 3'; Pell 11'	Stadium: Rodney Parade; Attendance: 540; Referee: Simon Hooper

=== FA Cup ===
4 November 2017 Round 1	Newport County	2–1	Walsall	Newport
17:15 UTC	Nouble 17'; McCoulsky 46'	Report	Bakayoko 77'	Stadium: Rodney Parade; Attendance: 2,701; Referee: Gavin Ward

3 December 2017 Round 2	Newport County	2–0	Cambridge United	Newport
14:00 UTC	Labadie 2', 82'	Report		Stadium: Rodney Parade; Attendance: 2,748; Referee: Kevin Johnson

7 January 2018 Round 3	Newport County	2–1	Leeds United	Newport
12:00 UTC	Shaughnessy 76' (o.g.); McCoulsky 89'	Report	Berardi 9'	Stadium: Rodney Parade; Attendance: 6,887; Referee: Mike Dean

27 January 2018 Round 4	Newport County	1–1	Tottenham Hotspur	Newport
17:30 UTC	Amond 38'	Report	Kane 82'	Stadium: Rodney Parade; Attendance: 9,836; Referee: Roger East

7 February 2018 Round 4 replay	Tottenham Hotspur	2–0	Newport County	London
20:00 UTC	Butler 26' (o.g.); Lamela 34'	Report		Stadium: Wembley Stadium; Attendance: 38,947; Referee: Stuart Attwell

== Squad statistics ==
Numbers in parentheses denote appearances as substitute.
Players with squad numbers struck through and marked † left the club during the playing season.
Players with names in italics and marked * were on loan from another club for the whole of their season with Newport County.
Players listed with no appearances have been in the matchday squad but only as unused substitutes.
Key to positions: GK – Goalkeeper; DF – Defender; MF – Midfielder; FW – Forward

No.	Pos.	Nat.	Name	Apps	Goals	Apps	Goals	Apps	Goals	Apps	Goals	Apps	Goals	Yellow card	Red card
No.	Pos.	Nat.	Name	League		FA Cup		EFL Cup		EFL Trophy		Total		Discipline	
1	GK	ENG	Joe Day	46	0	5	0	2	0	1	0	54	0	0	0
2	DF	WAL	David Pipe	33 (2)	0	5	0	2	0	1	0	41 (2)	0	2	0
3	DF	ENG	Dan Butler	40 (4)	1	5	0	1	0	3	0	49 (4)	1	3	1
4	MF	ENG	Joss Labadie	24 (1)	3	4	2	1 (1)	1	0	0	29 (2)	6	9	1
6	DF	ENG	Ben White *	42	1	5	0	2	0	2	0	49	1	6	0
7	MF	ENG	Robbie Willmott	36 (3)	2	4 (1)	0	2	0	1	0	43 (4)	2	4	0
8	MF	ENG	Matthew Dolan	39 (1)	3	3 (2)	0	2	0	0 (1)	0	44 (2)	3	6	0
9	FW	IRL	Pádraig Amond	37 (6)	13	3 (2)	1	0	0	0 (3)	0	40 (11)	14	1	0
10	FW	ENG	Frank Nouble	38 (7)	9	5	1	0 (2)	0	0	0	43 (9)	10	9	0
11	FW	ENG	Lamar Reynolds	1 (9)	0	0	0	2	0	2	1	5 (9)	1	1	0
12	MF	ENG	Ben Tozer	33 (6)	3	4	0	0 (1)	0	1	0	38 (7)	3	3	0
13	FW	ENG	Marlon Jackson	0 (6)	0	0	0	0	0	1	0	1 (6)	0	0	0
14	DF	ENG	Jazzi Barnum-Bobb	0 (1)	0	0	0	0	0	1 (1)	0	1 (2)	0	0	0
15	FW	ENG	Shawn McCoulsky *	8 (19)	6	2 (3)	2	2	2	1	1	13 (22)	11	2	0
17	DF	ENG	Scot Bennett	21 (7)	2	3 (1)	0	1	0	3	0	28 (8)	2	2	0
18	DF	WAL	Jay Foulston	0	0	0	0	0 (1)	0	2	0	2 (1)	0	0	0
~~19~~ †	FW	ENG	Aaron Williams	0	0	0	0	0	0	0	0	0	0	0	0
19	DF	ENG	Tyler Reid *	3 (4)	0	0	0	0	0	0	0	3 (4)	0	0	0
20	MF	ENG	Tom Owen-Evans	3 (9)	0	0	0	1	0	2	0	6 (9)	0	2	0
21	MF	WAL	Lewis Collins	0	0	0	0	0	0	0 (1)	0	0 (1)	0	0	0
~~22~~ †	MF	ENG	Reece Cole *	2 (2)	1	0	0	0	0	0 (1)	0	2 (3)	1	0	0
22	MF	IRL	Emmanuel Osadebe *	0 (3)	0	0	0	0	0	0	0	0 (3)	0	0	0
23	MF	WAL	Michael Flynn	0	0	0	0	0	0	0	0	0	0	0	0
24	FW	WAL	Momodou Touray	0 (1)	0	0	0	0	0	0	0	0 (1)	0	0	0
25	DF	IRL	Mark O'Brien	26 (2)	0	2 (2)	0	1	0	0	0	29 (4)	0	4	1
27	FW	ENG	Sean Rigg	9 (7)	0	0 (1)	0	1	0	3	0	13 (8)	0	2	0
28	DF	ENG	Mickey Demetriou	46	7	5	0	2	0	0	0	46	7	5	0
~~29~~ †	FW	IRL	Joe Quigley *	1 (1)	0	0	0	0 (1)	0	2	0	3 (2)	0	1	0
30	GK	ENG	James Bittner	0	0	0	0	0	0	2	0	2	0	0	0
31	MF	WAL	Josh Sheehan	9 (4)	2	0	0	0	0	0	0	9 (4)	2	0	0
32	DF	ATG	Calaum Jahraldo-Martin	0 (4)	0	0	0	0	0	2	0	2 (2)	0	0	0
33	MF	WAL	Evan Press	0	0	0	0	0	0	1	0	1	0	0	0
34	MF	WAL	Tom Hillman	0	0	0	0	0	0	1	0	1	0	0	0
36	MF	WAL	Owen Taylor	0	0	0	0	0	0	1	0	1	0	0	0
39	FW	ENG	Paul Hayes	3 (10)	3	0	0	0	0	0	0	3 (10)	3	0	0
45	FW	WAL	Aaron Collins *	6 (4)	0	0	0	0	0	0	0	6 (4)	0	0	0

Players not included in matchday squads
No.	Pos.	Nat.	Name
16	DF	ENG	Jamie Turley
