= Foulston =

Foulston is a Welsh surname. Notable people with the surname include:

- John Foulston (1772–1841), English architect
- Jay Foulston (born 2000), Welsh footballer
