= Owen Taylor =

Welsh footballer

Personal information
- Full name: Owen Philip Taylor
- Date of birth: 6 March 2001 (age 25)
- Position: Midfielder

Youth career
- Newport County

Senior career*
Years	Team	Apps	(Gls)
2017–2019	Newport County	0	(0)
- * Club domestic league appearances and goals as of 17:24, 27 May 2019 (UTC)

Owen Taylor is a Welsh professional footballer who plays as a midfielder.

== Playing career ==
Taylor came through the Newport County youth team to make his first team debut on 7 November 2017, coming on as a 70th-minute substitute for Marlon Jackson in a 2–1 defeat to Cheltenham Town in an EFL Trophy group stage match at Rodney Parade. He was released by Newport at the end of the 2018–19 season.

== Career statistics ==
As of match played 1 January 2018

Appearances and goals by club, season and competition
Club	Season	League			FA Cup		League Cup		Other		Total	
Club	Season	Division	Apps	Goals	Apps	Goals	Apps	Goals	Apps	Goals	Apps	Goals
Newport County	2017–18	League Two	0	0	0	0	0	0	1 (Note: Appearance in the EFL Trophy)	0	1	0
Newport County	2018–19	League Two	0	0	0	0	0	0	1	0	1	0
Career total			0	0	0	0	0	0	2	0	2	0
