= Evan Press =

Welsh footballer

Personal information
- Full name: Evan Lewis Press
- Date of birth: 26 June 2000 (age 26)
- Height: 1.85 m (6 ft 1 in)
- Position: Midfielder

Youth career
- 2014–2017: Newport County

Senior career*
Years	Team	Apps	(Gls)
2017–2018	Newport County	0	(0)
2018–2025	Barry Town United	163	(9)
- * Club domestic league appearances and goals as of 19:40, 23 March 2025 (UTC)

Evan Lewis Press (born 26 June 2000) is a Welsh footballer who most recently played as a midfielder for Cymru Premier club Barry Town United. He is currently serving a two-and-a-half prison sentence for dealing cocaine.

== Playing career ==
Press came through the Newport County youth team and made his first team debut on 7 November 2017, in a 2–1 defeat by Cheltenham Town in an EFL Trophy group stage match at Rodney Parade. He was released at the end of the 2017–18 season and joined Barry Town United.

== Personal life ==
In March 2025, Press was jailed for two-and-a-half years for dealing cocaine between February 2021 and November 2023.

== Career statistics ==
As of match played 1 January 2018

Appearances and goals by club, season and competition
Club	Season	League			FA Cup		League Cup		Other		Total	
Club	Season	Division	Apps	Goals	Apps	Goals	Apps	Goals	Apps	Goals	Apps	Goals
Newport County	2017–18	League Two	0	0	0	0	0	0	1 (Note: Appearance in the EFL Trophy)	0	1	0
Career total			0	0	0	0	0	0	1	0	1	0
