= Jay Foulston =

Welsh footballer (born 2000)

Personal information
- Full name: Jay K. Edward Foulston
- Date of birth: 27 November 2000 (age 25)
- Place of birth: Swansea, Wales
- Height: 1.82 m (6 ft 0 in)
- Position: Defender

Team information
- Current team: Torquay United
- Number: 3

Youth career
- –2017: Newport County

Senior career*
Years	Team	Apps	(Gls)
2017–2020	Newport County	4	(0)
2019	→ Merthyr Town (loan)	7	(1)
2019–2020	→ Chippenham Town (loan)	31	(1)
2020–2024	Taunton Town	82	(7)
2021	→ Chippenham Town (loan)	1	(0)
2023-2024	→ Yeovil Town (loan)	20	(1)
2024–2026	Torquay United	79	(3)
2026–	Merthyr Town	7	(2)

International career
2018–2019	Wales U19	11	(1)
- * Club domestic league appearances and goals as of 21:35, 6 September 2026 (UTC)

Jay K. Edward Foulston (born 27 November 2000) is a Welsh professional footballer who plays as a defender for National League North side Merthyr Town.

== Club career ==
Foulston was a product of the Newport County academy, and was promoted to the first team squad in July 2017 following appearances in Newport's pre-season friendly matches.

He made his senior debut at 16 years old for Newport County on 8 August 2017 in a Football League Cup first round match versus Southend United, during which he entered into play as a late second-half substitute. Newport won the game 2–0. His debut aged 16 years 8 months and 12 days made him the third youngest ever County player, behind Regan Poole and Steve Aizlewood

On 16 April 2018, he signed his first professional contract at Newport until June 2020. On 10 January 2019, he joined Merthyr Town on loan until the end of the 2018–19 season. On 11 July 2019, he joined Chippenham Town on loan until the end of the 2019–20 season.

He was released by Newport County at the end of the 2019–20 season. On 24 August 2020, he was signed on free transfer from Newport County to Taunton Town, where as of 20 November 2023 he has made 53 appearances, scoring 4 goals, and was part of the squad that won the 2021–22 Southern Football League Premier Division South. He won the club's Goal of the Season award for both the 2019–20 and 2022–23 seasons.

On 15 December 2023, Foulston joined fellow National League South side Yeovil Town on loan until the end of the 2023–24 season with a view to a permanent move.

== International career ==
In March 2018, Foulston was called up to the Wales under 19 squad for two friendly international matches against Croatia.

== Career statistics ==
As of match played 5 September 2026

Appearances and goals by club, season and competition
Club	Season	League			FA Cup		EFL Cup		Other		Total	
Club	Season	Division	Apps	Goals	Apps	Goals	Apps	Goals	Apps	Goals	Apps	Goals
Newport County	2017–18	League Two	0	0	0	0	1	0	2 (Note: Appearances in EFL Trophy)	0	3	0
Newport County	2018–19	League Two	0	0	0	0	0	0	2	0	2	0
Newport County	2019–20	League Two	0	0	0	0	0	0	0	0	0	0
Newport County	Total		0	0	0	0	1	0	4	0	5	0
Merthyr Town (loan)	2018–19	Southern League; Premier Division South	7	1	—		—		—		7	1
Chippenham Town (loan)	2019–20	National League South	31	1	5	1	—		3 (Note: Two appearances in FA Trophy, one appearance in Wiltshire Premier Shield)	0	39	2
Taunton Town	2020–21	Southern League; Premier Division South	6	0	4	0	—		1 (Note: Appearance(s) in FA Trophy)	1	11	1
Taunton Town	2021–22	Southern League; Premier Division South	34	4	0	0	—		6 (Note: One appearance in FA Trophy, five appearances and one goal in Southern League Cup)	1	40	5
Taunton Town	2022–23	National League South	34	2	5	0	—		4 (Note: Three appearances and one goal in FA Trophy, one appearance in Somerset Premier Cup)	1	43	3
Taunton Town	2023–24	National League South	8	1	1	0	—		3 (Note: One appearance in FA Trophy, two appearances in Somerset Premier Cup)	0	12	1
Taunton Town	Total		82	7	10	0	—		14	3	106	10
Chippenham Town (loan)	2020–21	National League South	1	0	—		—		—		1	0
Yeovil Town (loan)	2023–24	National League South	20	1	—		—		—		20	1
Torquay United	2024–25	National League South	33	3	0	0	—		3 (Note: Two appearances in FA Trophy, one appearance in National League South play-offs)	0	36	3
Torquay United	2025–26	National League South	46	0	1	0	—		3 (Note: One appearance in FA Trophy, two appearances in National League South play-offs)	0	50	0
Torquay United	Total		79	3	1	0	—		6	0	86	3
Merthyr Town	2026–27	National League North	7	2	0	0	—		0	0	7	2
Career total			227	15	16	1	1	0	27	3	271	19

== Honours ==
Taunton Town

- Southern League Premier Division South: 2021–22

Yeovil Town

- National League South: 2023–24
