= Lamar Reynolds =

Jamaican born English footballer (born 1995)

Personal information
- Full name: Lamar Reynolds
- Date of birth: 16 August 1995 (age 31)
- Place of birth: London, England
- Height: 1.77 m (5 ft 9 1/2 in)
- Position: Forward

Team information
- Current team: Tonbridge Angels

Youth career
- –2013: Barking

Senior career*
Years	Team	Apps	(Gls)
2013–2014	Barking	27	(9)
2014–2015	Thurrock	23	(1)
2015	Aveley	4	(0)
2015–2016	Grays Athletic	12	(0)
2015–2016	→ Heybridge Swifts (loan)	6	(0)
2016	Barking	15	(10)
2016–2017	Brentwood Town	35	(26)
2017–2018	Newport County	10	(0)
2018	→ Leyton Orient (loan)	9	(0)
2018–2019	Dagenham & Redbridge	24	(1)
2019	→ Chelmsford City (loan)	8	(1)
2019–2022	Concord Rangers	68	(8)
2022–2023	Braintree Town	35	(5)
2023–2024	Maidstone United	26	(1)
2024–2025	Greenock Morton	22	(1)
2025–2026	Enfield Town	40	(10)
2026–	Tonbridge Angels	4	(2)
- * Club domestic league appearances and goals as of 1 September 2026

Lamar Reynolds (born 16 August 1995) is an English-born Jamaican professional footballer for National League South club Tonbridge Angels.

== Career ==
Reynolds began his career with Barking, joining the club's youth academy at the age of 16. He graduated into the first-team during the 2012–13 season, scoring his first goals for the club with a brace during a 6–1 victory over Sporting Bengal United on 5 January 2013. He later played for Thurrock, scoring once in 23 league appearances, and Aveley before joining Grays Athletic in 2015. On 6 November 2015, Reynolds joined Heybridge Swifts on loan, making his debut the following day in a 3–1 defeat to Soham Town Rangers. He went on to play in a further seven matches in all competitions for the club.

In January 2016, Reynolds returned to his first club Barking after failing to break into the first-team with Grays, having featured in 12 league matches for the club. Despite only playing the second half of the season, Reynolds finished as Barking's second highest top scorer with 10 goals in 15 appearances, including a hat-trick during an 8–0 victory over Tower Hamlets on 8 March 2016. Reynolds joined Isthmian League North Division club Brentwood Town for the 2016–17 season, scoring 27 goals in 38 matches.

In June 2017, Reynolds was one of 42 players who attended the V9 Academy, a week long training programme set up by England international Jamie Vardy to showcase players from non-League clubs to scouts, at the Etihad Campus in Manchester. After impressing scouts at the academy, Reynolds joined League Two side Newport County on a two-year deal. He made his professional debut on the opening day of the 2017–18 season in a 3–3 draw at Stevenage. On 4 January 2018, Reynolds joined Leyton Orient on loan for the remainder of the 2017–18 season.

On 2 July 2018, Reynolds joined Dagenham & Redbridge on a free transfer with Newport securing a sell on clause as part of the deal. On 21 March 2019, Chelmsford City signed Reynolds on loan until the end of the season. In May 2019, it was announced that he would be released following the expiration of his contract at the end of the 2018–19 campaign.

On 20 June 2019, he signed for National League South side Concord Rangers on a free transfer following his release from Dagenham.

Following an unsuccessful trial with Scottish side Livingston, Reynolds joined National League South side Braintree Town on 25 August 2022.

On 22 May 2023, Reynolds agreed to join Maidstone United, following the club's relegation to the National League South.

On 27 January 2024, Reynolds scored the opening goal for Maidstone in their fourth round FA Cup tie against Ipswich Town and assisted Sam Corne's eventual winner; Maidstone would ultimately beat Ipswich 2-1, despite being four tiers below their opponents.

On 27 May 2024, Reynolds signed a pre-contract agreement with Scottish Championship club Greenock Morton, agreeing to a one-year deal with the Ton.

In June 2026, following a season with Enfield Town, Reynolds joined National League South side Tonbridge Angels.

== Career statistics ==
As of match played 27 January 2024

Appearances and goals by club, season and competition
Club	Season	League			FA Cup		EFL Cup		Other		Total	
Club	Season	Division	Apps	Goals	Apps	Goals	Apps	Goals	Apps	Goals	Apps	Goals
Barking	2012–13	Essex Senior League	10	2			—				10	2
Barking	2013–14	Essex Senior League	17	7			—				17	7
Barking	Total		27	9			—				27	9
Thurrock	2013–14	IL Division One North	2	0	0	0	—		0	0	2	0
Thurrock	2014–15	IL Division One North	21	1	1	1	—		5 (Note: Appearance(s) in the FA Trophy, Alan Turvey Trophy and Essex Senior Cup)	1	27	3
Thurrock	Total		23	1	1	1	2	0	5	0	29	3
Aveley	2014–15	IL Division One North	4	0	—		—		—		4	0
Grays Athletic	2015–16	IL Premier Division	12	0	3	0	—		2 (Note: Appearance(s) in Alan Turvey Trophy)	0	17	0
Heybridge Swifts (loan)	2015–16	IL Division One North	6	0	—		—		2	0	8	0
Barking	2015–16	Essex Senior League	15	10	—		—		—		15	10
Brentwood Town	2016–17	IL Division One North	35	26	1	0	—		2 (Note: Appearance(s) in FA Trophy and Alan Turvey Trophy)	1	38	27
Newport County	2017–18	League Two	10	0	0	0	2	0	2 (Note: Appearance(s) in EFL Trophy)	1	14	1
Leyton Orient (loan)	2017–18	National League	9	0	—		—		3 (Note: Appearance(s) in FA Trophy)	0	12	0
Dagenham & Redbridge	2018–19	National League	24	1	2	0	—		0	0	26	1
Chelmsford City (loan)	2018–19	National League South	8	1	—		—		1 (Note: Appearances in National League South play-offs)	0	9	1
Concord Rangers	2019–20	National League South	21	2	1	0	—		11 (Note: 9 appearances and 2 goals in FA Trophy, 2 appearances and 3 goals in Essex Senior Cup)	5	33	7
Concord Rangers	2020–21	National League South	10	0	4	0	—		0	0	14	0
Concord Rangers	2021–22	National League South	37	6	1	0	—		1	0	39	6
Concord Rangers	Total		68	8	6	0	—		12	5	86	13
Braintree Town	2022–23	National League South	36	6	3	0	—		3 (Note: 2 appearances in FA Trophy, 1 appearance and 1 goal in National League South play-offs)	1	42	7
Maidstone United	2023–24	National League South	19	0	4	1	—		0	0	23	1
Total			296	62	20	2	2	0	32	9	350	73

== Honours ==
Concord Rangers

- FA Trophy runner-up: 2019–20
