= 1978–79 Newport County A.F.C. season =

Welsh association football club season

Newport County
1978–79 season
- Chairman: Richard Ford
- Manager: Len Ashurst
- Stadium: Somerton Park
- Fourth Division: 8th
- FA Cup: 4th round
- League Cup: 1st round
- Welsh Cup: 4th round
- Top goalscorer: League: Goddard (18); All: Goddard (22)
- Highest home attendance: 14,124 vs West Ham United (FA Cup, 9 Jan 1979)
- Lowest home attendance: 2,235 vs Bournemouth (1 May 1979)
- Average home league attendance: 3,731
Home colours	Away colours

The 1978–79 season was Newport County's 17th consecutive season in the Football League Fourth Division and their 51st season overall in the Football League.

== Season review ==
=== Results summary ===
Overall								Home						Away					
Pld	W	D	L	GF	GA	GD	Pts	W	D	L	GF	GA	GD	W	D	L	GF	GA	GD
46	21	10	15	66	55	+11	52	12	5	6	39	28	+11	9	5	9	27	27	0

Source: rsssf.com

=== Results by round ===
Round	1	2	3	4	5	6	7	8	9	10	11	12	13	14	15	16	17	18	19	20	21	22	23	24	25	26	27	28	29	30	31	32	33	34	35	36	37	38	39	40	41	42	43	44	45	46
Ground	A	H	H	A	A	H	H	A	A	H	A	H	H	A	H	A	H	A	H	A	A	H	H	H	H	A	A	H	H	A	A	A	H	A	A	H	A	H	A	H	H	A	A	H	H	A
Result	L	L	L	W	L	L	L	W	D	D	W	W	D	D	D	L	W	D	W	L	W	D	W	W	W	L	W	L	W	D	L	W	W	W	W	W	L	W	L	L	W	D	L	D	W	W
Position	23	24	24	18	21	21	22	22	18	21	20	17	16	17	17	18	15	15	15	17	12	10	8	9	7	9	8	8	8	8	8	8	8	7	7	7	8	7	8	8	8	8	8	8	7	7

Updated to match(es) played on 5 May 1979. Source: statto.com
A = Away; H = Home; W = Win; D = Draw; L = Loss

== Fixtures and results ==
=== Fourth Division ===
Date	Opponents	Venue	Result	Scorers	Attendance
19 Aug 1978	Bournemouth	A	1–3	Goddard	3,083
22 Aug 1978	Aldershot	H	1–2	Williams	3,374
26 Aug 1978	Stockport County	H	1–2	Goddard	2,659
2 Sep 1978	Wigan Athletic	A	3–2	Sinclair, Goddard, Woods	5,319
9 Sep 1978	Reading	A	1–2	Vaughan	5,089
12 Sep 1978	Crewe Alexandra	H	1–2	Woods	3,176
16 Sep 1978	Wimbledon	H	1–3	Clark	2,903
23 Sep 1978	Bradford City	A	3–1	Lowndes 2, Sinclair	4,471
25 Sep 1978	Hartlepool United	A	0–0		5,491
30 Sep 1978	York City	H	1–1	Sinclair	3,021
7 Oct 1978	Scunthorpe United	A	3–2	Bailey, Lowndes, Sinclair	2,453
14 Oct 1978	Huddersfield Town	H	2–1	Goddard 2	3,624
17 Oct 1978	Rochdale	H	0–0		3,472
21 Oct 1978	Doncaster Rovers	A	0–0		2,008
28 Oct 1978	Barnsley	H	1–1	Lowndes	4,570
4 Nov 1978	Northampton Town	A	1–3	Bruton	3,065
10 Nov 1978	Wigan Athletic	H	2–1	Goddard, Vaughan	4,142
17 Nov 1978	Stockport County	A	1–1	Warriner	4,009
2 Dec 1978	Darlington	H	2–1	Walden 2	3,450
9 Dec 1978	Grimsby Town	A	0–1		3,667
22 Dec 1978	Hereford United	A	3–0	Bruton, Goddard, Oakes	2,834
26 Dec 1978	Torquay United	H	1–1	OG	6,930
30 Dec 1978	Port Vale	H	1–0	Goddard	4,104
13 Jan 1979	Reading	H	3–2	Goddard 2, Davies	5,968
2 Feb 1979	Hartlepool United	H	3–2	Goddard 2, Lowndes	3,659
20 Feb 1979	Portsmouth	A	1–2	Moore	8,206
24 Feb 1979	Huddersfield Town	A	1–0	Bruton	3,361
27 Feb 1979	Bradford City	H	2–4	Oakes, Tynan	4,225
3 Mar 1979	Doncaster Rovers	H	3–0	Moore, Tynan, Lowndes	2,550
6 Mar 1979	Wimbledon	A	0–0		2,980
10 Mar 1979	Barnsley	A	0–1		9,428
13 Mar 1979	Crewe Alexandra	A	1–0	Tynan	1,459
16 Mar 1979	Northampton Town	H	2–1	Goddard, Bruton	3,018
20 Mar 1979	York City	A	2–1	Tynan, Goddard	2,156
24 Mar 1979	Aldershot	A	3–2	Tynan, Moore, Lowndes	5,243
31 Mar 1979	Halifax Town	H	2–0	Bruton, Vaughan	3,927
7 Apr 1979	Darlington	A	0–1		1,518
11 Apr 1979	Hereford United	H	4–1	Goddard, Moore, Oakes, Lowndes	3,771
14 Apr 1979	Torquay United	A	0–2		3,181
16 Apr 1979	Portsmouth	H	1–2	Goddard	5,421
18 Apr 1979	Scunthorpe United	H	2–0	Thompson, Oakes	2,572
21 Apr 1979	Port Vale	A	1–1	Tynan	2,444
23 Apr 1979	Rochdale	A	0–1		1,457
28 Apr 1979	Grimsby Town	H	1–1	Oakes	3,049
1 May 1979	Bournemouth	H	2–0	Tynan, Vaughan	2,235
5 May 1979	Halifax Town	A	2–1	Goddard 2	1,007

=== FA Cup ===
Round	Date	Opponents	Venue	Result	Scorers	Attendance
1	25 Nov 1978	Hereford United	A	1–0	Goddard	6,939
2	16 Dec 1978	Worcester City	H	0–0		7,196
2r	18 Dec 1978	Worcester City	A	2–1	Goddard 2	10,233
3	9 Jan 1979	West Ham United	H	2–1	Woods, Goddard	14,124
4	30 Jan 1979	Colchester United	H	0–0		10,329
4r	5 Feb 1979	Colchester United	A	0–1		7,029

=== Football League Cup ===
Round	Date	Opponents	Venue	Result	Scorers	Attendance	Notes
1–1	12 Aug 1978	Swansea City	H	2–1	Woods, M.Williams	5,572	
1–2	15 Aug 1978	Swansea City	A	0–5		7,834	2–6 agg

=== Welsh Cup ===
Round	Date	Opponents	Venue	Result	Scorers	Attendance
4	15 Jan 1979	Ton Pentre	H	0–2		1,447

== League table ==
Pos	Team	Pld	W	D	L	GF	GA	GD	Pts
6	Wigan Athletic	46	21	13	12	63	48	+15	55
7	Portsmouth	46	20	12	14	62	48	+14	52
8	Newport County	46	21	10	15	66	55	+11	52
9	Huddersfield Town	46	18	11	17	57	53	+4	47
10	York City	46	18	11	17	51	55	−4	47
