= 1948–49 Newport County A.F.C. season =

Welsh association football club season

Newport County
1948–49 season
- Manager: Tom Bromilow
- Stadium: Somerton Park
- Third Division South: 15th
- FA Cup: 5th round
- Welsh Cup: 5th round
- Top goalscorer: League: Parker (20); All: Carr/Parker (23)
- Highest home attendance: 22,500 vs Huddersfield Town (29 January 1949)
- Lowest home attendance: 4,552 vs Watford (2 September 1948)
- Average home league attendance: 11,877
| Home colours | Away colours |

The 1948–49 season was Newport County's second consecutive season in the Third Division South since relegation from the Second Division at the end of the 1946–47 season. It was the club's 20th season in the third tier and 21st season overall in the Football League.

== Season review ==
=== Results summary ===
| Overall | | | | | | | | Home | | | | | | Away | | | | | |
| Pld | W | D | L | GF | GA | GAv | Pts | W | D | L | GF | GA | Pts | W | D | L | GF | GA | Pts |
|---|---|---|---|---|---|---|---|---|---|---|---|---|---|---|---|---|---|---|---|
| 42 | 14 | 9 | 19 | 68 | 92 | 0.739 | 37 | 8 | 6 | 7 | 41 | 35 | 22 | 6 | 3 | 12 | 27 | 57 | 15 |

Source: rsssf.com

=== Results by round ===
| Round | 1 | 2 | 3 | 4 | 5 | 6 | 7 | 8 | 9 | 10 | 11 | 12 | 13 | 14 | 15 | 16 | 17 | 18 | 19 | 20 | 21 | 22 | 23 | 24 | 25 | 26 | 27 | 28 | 29 | 30 | 31 | 32 | 33 | 34 | 35 | 36 | 37 | 38 | 39 | 40 | 41 | 42 |
|---|---|---|---|---|---|---|---|---|---|---|---|---|---|---|---|---|---|---|---|---|---|---|---|---|---|---|---|---|---|---|---|---|---|---|---|---|---|---|---|---|---|---|
| Ground | H | A | A | H | H | A | A | H | H | A | H | A | H | A | H | A | H | A | A | A | H | A | H | A | H | H | H | A | H | A | A | H | H | A | H | H | A | A | H | H | A | A |
| Result | L | D | L | D | D | L | L | D | L | L | W | L | D | L | W | L | W | L | L | W | W | W | W | L | D | W | W | W | W | L | D | D | L | W | L | L | L | W | L | L | W | D |
| Position | 15 | 15 | 19 | 18 | 21 | 22 | 22 | 22 | 22 | 22 | 22 | 22 | 21 | 21 | 21 | 21 | 21 | 21 | 22 | 21 | 21 | 20 | 16 | 19 | 19 | 19 | 18 | 17 | 13 | 14 | 14 | 15 | 15 | 15 | 15 | 15 | 15 | 15 | 17 | 18 | 15 | 15 |

Updated to match(es) played on 7 May 1949. Source: statto.com statto.com
A = Away; H = Home; W = Win; D = Draw; L = Loss

== Fixtures and results ==
=== Third Division South ===
| Date | Opponents | Venue | Result | Scorers | Attendance |
|---|---|---|---|---|---|
| Sat 21 Aug 1948 | Bournemouth & Boscombe Athletic | H | 1–2 | Parker | 11,015 |
| Wed 25 Aug 1948 | Watford | A | 2–2 | Carr, Harper | 10,568 |
| Sat 28 Aug 1948 | Ipswich Town | A | 1–5 | Harper | 17,990 |
| Thu 2 Sep 1948 | Watford | H | 1–1 | Parker | 4,552 |
| Sat 4 Sep 1948 | Notts County | H | 3–3 | Lewis, Parker, Harper | 16,776 |
| Wed 8 Sep 1948 | Reading | A | 1–4 | Parker | 12,076 |
| Sat 11 Sep 1948 | Walsall | A | 1–3 | Parker | 12,771 |
| Thu 16 Sep 1948 | Reading | H | 1–1 | Parker | 9,863 |
| Sat 18 Sep 1948 | Torquay United | H | 1–2 | Parker | 10,664 |
| Sat 25 Sep 1948 | Bristol Rovers | A | 1–3 | H.Williams | 22,277 |
| Sat 2 Oct 1948 | Swindon Town | H | 4–1 | Lewis 2, H.Williams, Newall | 11,657 |
| Sat 9 Oct 1948 | Leyton Orient | A | 2–5 | Parker, H.J.Williams | 14,692 |
| Sat 16 Oct 1948 | Port Vale | H | 2–2 | H.Williams, Parker | 10,037 |
| Sat 23 Oct 1948 | Northampton Town | A | 1–2 | Parker | 8,178 |
| Sat 30 Oct 1948 | Norwich City | H | 4–3 | Carr 3, Comley | 11,068 |
| Sat 6 Nov 1948 | Brighton & Hove Albion | A | 2–3 | Parker 2 | 17,011 |
| Sat 13 Nov 1948 | Southend United | H | 4–2 | H.Williams, Carr, Comley, Parker | 12,262 |
| Sat 20 Nov 1948 | Millwall | A | 1–3 | Parker | 25,441 |
| Sat 4 Dec 1948 | Swindon Town | A | 2–5 | Parker, Carr | 14,893 |
| Sat 18 Dec 1948 | Bournemouth & Boscombe Athletic | A | 2–1 | Roffi, Comley | 13,188 |
| Sat 25 Dec 1948 | Crystal Palace | H | 5–0 | Carr 2, Comley 2, Harper | 15,115 |
| Mon 27 Dec 1948 | Crystal Palace | A | 1–0 | Parker | 10,951 |
| Sat 1 Jan 1949 | Ipswich Town | H | 3–0 | Carr 2, Comley | 9,465 |
| Sat 15 Jan 1949 | Notts County | A | 1–11 | Carr | 26,843 |
| Sat 22 Jan 1949 | Walsall | H | 1–1 | Roffi | 14,536 |
| Sat 19 Feb 1949 | Bristol Rovers | H | 2–1 | Roffi, Parker | 20,502 |
| Sat 5 Mar 1949 | Leyton Orient | H | 3–2 | Comley 2, Parker | 6,701 |
| Sat 12 Mar 1949 | Port Vale | A | 2–1 | Carr 2 | 9,487 |
| Sat 19 Mar 1949 | Northampton Town | H | 2–0 | Carr 2 | 14,869 |
| Wed 23 Mar 1949 | Torquay United | A | 0–4 | | 6,538 |
| Sat 26 Mar 1949 | Norwich City | A | 0–0 | | 23,214 |
| Sat 2 Apr 1949 | Brighton & Hove Albion | H | 1–1 | Carr | 11,779 |
| Thu 7 Apr 1949 | Bristol City | H | 0–2 | | 10,278 |
| Sat 9 Apr 1949 | Southend United | A | 1–0 | Lewis | 7,865 |
| Fri 15 Apr 1949 | Swansea Town | H | 2–5 | Parker, Carr | 21,167 |
| Sat 16 Apr 1949 | Millwall | H | 1–2 | Parker | 11,067 |
| Mon 18 Apr 1949 | Swansea Town | A | 1–2 | Parker | 28,623 |
| Sat 23 Apr 1949 | Aldershot | A | 2–1 | H.Williams 2 | 7,288 |
| Thu 28 Apr 1949 | Aldershot | H | 0–2 | | 8,096 |
| Sat 30 Apr 1949 | Exeter City | H | 0–2 | | 7,964 |
| Wed 4 May 1949 | Exeter City | A | 2–1 | Hayward 2 | 6,593 |
| Sat 7 May 1949 | Bristol City | A | 1–1 | Roffi | 13,188 |

=== FA Cup ===
| Round | Date | Opponents | Venue | Result | Scorers | Attendance |
|---|---|---|---|---|---|---|
| 1 | Sat 27 Nov 1948 | Brighton & Hove Albion | H | 3–1 | Comley 2, Parker | 14,000 |
| 2 | Sat 11 Dec 1948 | Leytonstone | A | 4–3 | Carr 2, Harper, Comley | 10,000 |
| 3 | Sat 8 Jan 1949 | Leeds United | A | 3–1 | Roffi, Carr, Comley | 31,500 |
| 4 | Sat 29 Jan 1949 | Huddersfield Town | H | 3–3 | H.Williams, Carr, Comley | 22,500 |
| 4r | Sat 5 Feb 1949 | Huddersfield Town | A | 3–1 | Parker 2, Carr | 34,183 |
| 5 | Sat 12 Feb 1949 | Portsmouth | A | 2–3 a.e.t. | Carr, Harper | 48,581 |

=== Welsh Cup ===
| Round | Date | Opponents | Venue | Result | Scorers | Attendance |
|---|---|---|---|---|---|---|
| 5 | Wed 12 Jan 1949 | Milford Town | A | 0–2 | | |

== League table ==
| Pos | Team | Pld | W | D | L | GF | GA | GAv | Pts |
|---|---|---|---|---|---|---|---|---|---|
| 13 | Port Vale | 42 | 14 | 11 | 17 | 51 | 54 | 0.944 | 39 |
| 14 | Walsall | 42 | 15 | 8 | 19 | 56 | 64 | 0.875 | 38 |
| 15 | Newport County | 42 | 14 | 9 | 19 | 68 | 92 | 0.739 | 37 |
| 16 | Bristol City | 42 | 11 | 14 | 17 | 44 | 62 | 0.710 | 36 |
| 17 | Watford | 42 | 10 | 15 | 17 | 41 | 54 | 0.759 | 35 |
