= Tom Hillman =

Welsh footballer

Personal information
- Full name: Thomas Patrick Hillman
- Date of birth: 20 November 2000 (age 25)
- Positions: Winger; full-back

Youth career
- Newport County

Senior career*
Years	Team	Apps	(Gls)
2017–2019	Newport County	0	(0)
- * Club domestic league appearances and goals as of 17:23, 27 May 2019 (UTC)

Thomas Patrick Hillman is a Welsh professional footballer who plays as a winger or full-back.

== Playing career ==
Hillman came through the Newport County youth team to make his first team debut on 7 November 2017, in a 2–1 defeat to Cheltenham Town in an EFL Trophy group stage match at Rodney Parade. He was released by Newport at the end of the 2018–19 season.

== Career statistics ==
As of match played 1 January 2018

Appearances and goals by club, season and competition
Club	Season	League			FA Cup		EFL Cup		Other		Total	
Club	Season	Division	Apps	Goals	Apps	Goals	Apps	Goals	Apps	Goals	Apps	Goals
Newport County	2017–18	League Two	0	0	0	0	0	0	1 (Note: Appearance in the EFL Trophy)	0	1	0
Career total			0	0	0	0	0	0	1	0	1	0
