= 2013–14 Burnley F.C. season =

English football club season

Burnley F.C.
2013–14 season
- Chairman: John Banaszkiewicz; Mike Garlick
- Manager: Sean Dyche
- Ground: Turf Moor
- Championship: 2nd (Promoted)
- FA Cup: Third round
- League Cup: Fourth round
- Top goalscorer: League: Danny Ings (21); All: Danny Ings (26)
- Highest home attendance: 19,125 (v Wigan Athletic, Championship, 21 April 2014)
- Lowest home attendance: 6,405 (v Nottingham Forest, League Cup, 24 September 2013)
- Average home league attendance: 13,719
Home colours	Away colours

The 2013–14 season was Burnley's 4th consecutive season in the Championship. They also competed in the League Cup and the FA Cup.

== Match details ==
League positions are sourced from Statto, while the remaining contents of each table are sourced from the references in the "Ref" column.

=== League table ===
Pos	Team	Pld	W	D	L	GF	GA	GD	Pts	Promotion, qualification or relegation
1	Leicester City (C, P)	46	31	9	6	83	43	+40	102	Promotion to the Premier League
2	Burnley (P)	46	26	15	5	72	37	+35	93	Promotion to the Premier League
3	Derby County	46	25	10	11	84	52	+32	85	Qualification for Championship play-offs
4	Queens Park Rangers (O, P)	46	23	11	12	60	44	+16	80	Qualification for Championship play-offs
5	Wigan Athletic	46	21	10	15	61	48	+13	73	Qualification for Championship play-offs

Source: BBC Sport
Rules for classification: 1) points; 2) goal difference; 3) number of goals scored
(C) Champions; (O) Play-off winners; (P) Promoted

=== Football League Championship ===
Date	League position	Opponents	Venue	Result	Score F–A	Scorers	Attendance	Ref
3 August 2013	11th	Bolton Wanderers	H	D	1–1	Ings 26'	12,919	
10 August 2013	4th	Sheffield Wednesday	A	W	2–1	Ings 33', Vokes 38'	22,282	
17 August 2013	3rd	Yeovil Town	H	W	2–0	Treacy 74', Vokes 79'	10,085	
24 August 2013	9th	Brighton & Hove Albion	A	L	0–2		26,007	
31 August 2013	3rd	Derby County	A	W	3–0	Ings 14', Vokes 32', Shackell 74'	23,514	
14 September 2013	5th	Blackburn Rovers	H	D	1–1	Stanislas 76'	15,699	
17 September 2013	4th	Birmingham City	H	W	3–0	Ings (2) 3', 54', Arfield 46'	9,641	
21 September 2013	2nd	Leeds United	A	W	2–1	Arfield 18', Vokes 42'	26,465	
28 September 2013	2nd	Charlton Athletic	H	W	3–0	Ings 38', Vokes (2) 67', 86'	10,645	
1 October 2013	1st	Doncaster Rovers	A	W	2–0	Vokes 45+1' pen., Jones 87' o.g.	7,836	
5 October 2013	1st	Reading	H	W	2–1	Ings 21', Vokes 80'	11,256	
19 October 2013	1st	Ipswich Town	A	W	1–0	Arfield 80'	16,062	
26 October 2013	1st	Queens Park Rangers	H	W	2–0	Ings (2) 65', 88' pen.	16,074	
2 November 2013	1st	Millwall	A	D	2–2	Vokes 39', Lowry 55' o.g.	10,168	
9 November 2013	1st	Bournemouth	H	D	1–1	Ings 84'	12,221	
23 November 2013	1st	Nottingham Forest	A	D	1–1	Vokes 28' pen.	22,877	
30 November 2013	2nd	Huddersfield Town	A	L	1–2	Ings 84'	17,390	
3 December 2013	3rd	Watford	H	D	0–0		10,910	
7 December 2013	1st	Barnsley	H	W	1–0	Kightly 65'	11,462	
14 December 2013	2nd	Leicester City	A	D	1–1	Ings 47'	23,143	
21 December 2013	1st	Blackpool	H	W	2–1	Ings 7', Arfield 47'	14,489	
26 December 2013	2nd	Middlesbrough	A	L	0–1		20,689	
29 December 2013	3rd	Wigan Athletic	A	D	0–0		17,712	
1 January 2014	2nd	Huddersfield Town	H	W	3–2	Ings (2) 6', 41', Trippier 79'	14,047	
11 January 2014	2nd	Yeovil Town	A	W	2–1	Ings 19', Vokes 62'	6,293	
18 January 2014	3rd	Sheffield Wednesday	H	D	1–1	Vokes 43'	13,735	
28 January 2014	3rd	Brighton & Hove Albion	H	D	0–0		11,054	
1 February 2014	3rd	Queens Park Rangers	A	D	3–3	Ings 25', Vokes (2) 54', 62'	16,393	
8 February 2014	2nd	Millwall	H	W	3–1	Ings (2) 29', 62', Marney 45+2'	11,502	
11 February 2014	2nd	Bolton Wanderers	A	W	1–0	Vokes 58'	16,439	
15 February 2014	2nd	Bournemouth	A	D	1–1	Treacy 67'	10,422	
22 February 2014	2nd	Nottingham Forest	H	W	3–1	Arfield 12', Vokes (2) 25', 35'	14,928	
1 March 2014	2nd	Derby County	H	W	2–0	Jones 29', Marney 68'	17,285	
9 March 2014	2nd	Blackburn Rovers	A	W	2–1	Shackell 73', Ings 79'	21,589	
12 March 2014	2nd	Birmingham City	A	D	3–3	Marney 30', Duff 67', Vokes 86'	16,695	
15 March 2014	2nd	Leeds United	H	W	2–1	Pearce 38' o.g., Arfield 67'	18,109	
22 March 2014	2nd	Charlton Athletic	A	W	3–0	Barnes 38', Vokes pen., Kightly 90+2'	16,113	
25 March 2014	2nd	Doncaster Rovers	H	W	2–0	Vokes 47' pen., Stanislas 75'	12,325	
29 March 2014	2nd	Leicester City	H	L	0–2		16,794	
5 April 2014	2nd	Watford	A	D	1–1	Arfield 86'	16,182	
8 April 2014	2nd	Barnsley	A	W	1–0	Barnes 7'	12,904	
12 April 2014	2nd	Middlesbrough	H	L	0–1		16,661	
18 April 2014	2nd	Blackpool	A	W	1–0	Kightly 49'	16,098	
21 April 2014	2nd	Wigan Athletic	H	W	2–0	Barnes 22', Kightly 42'	19,125	
26 April 2014	2nd	Ipswich Town	H	W	1–0	Kightly 54'	14,574	
3 May 2014	2nd	Reading	A	D	2–2	Arfield 20', Ings 28'	23,335	

=== FA Cup ===
Round	Date	Opponents	Venue	Result	Score F–A	Scorers	Attendance	Ref
Third round	4 January 2014	Southampton	A	L	3–4	Vokes 51', Ings 57', Long 87'	15,077	

=== Football League Cup ===
Round	Date	Opponents	Venue	Result	Score F–A	Scorers	Attendance	Ref
First round	6 August 2013	York City	A	W	4–0	Jones 12', Stanislas 61', Ings 78', Arfield 81'	3,922	
Second round	27 August 2013	Preston North End	H	W	2–0	Trippier 6', Ings 34'	10,648	
Third round	24 September 2013	Nottingham Forest	H	W	2–1	Ings (2) 45', 68'	6,405	
Fourth round	29 October 2013	West Ham United	H	L	0–2		14,376	

== Squad statistics ==
As of match played 3 May 2014.
Numbers in parentheses denote appearances as substitute.
Players with names struck through and marked † left the club during the playing season.
Players with names in italics and marked * were on loan from another club for the whole of their season with Burnley.
Players listed with no appearances have been in the matchday squad but only as unused substitutes.
Key to positions: GK – Goalkeeper; DF – Defender; MF – Midfielder; FW – Forward

No.	Pos.	Nat.	Name	League		FA Cup		League Cup		Total		Discipline	
No.	Pos.	Nat.	Name	Apps	Goals	Apps	Goals	Apps	Goals	Apps	Goals	A yellow rectangle, denoting the yellow penalty card shown to a player being cautioned	A red rectangle, denoting the red penalty card shown to a player being sent off
1	GK	ENG	Tom Heaton	46	0	1	0	3	0	50	0	1	1
2	DF	ENG	Kieran Trippier	41	1	1	0	4	1	46	2	2	0
3	DF	NIR	Daniel Lafferty	8 (2)	0	1	0	1	0	10 (2)	0	0	0
4	DF	NIR	Michael Duff	41	1	0	0	1	0	42	1	5	1
5	DF	ENG	Jason Shackell (C)	46	2	1	0	4	0	51	2	6	0
6	DF	ENG	Ben Mee	38	0	0	0	3	0	41	0	6	0
7	MF	SCO	Ross Wallace	5 (9)	0	0	0	1	0	6 (9)	0	2	0
8	MF	ENG	Dean Marney	38	3	1	0	2 (1)	0	41 (1)	3	11	0
9	FW	WAL	Sam Vokes	39	20	1	1	4	0	44	21	2	0
10	FW	ENG	Danny Ings	40	21	1	1	4	4	45	26	1	0
11	MF	ENG	Junior Stanislas	7 (20)	2	0 (1)	0	3 (1)	1	10 (22)	3	2	0
12	GK	AUS	Alex Cisak	0 (1)	0	0	0	1	0	1 (1)	0	0	0
14	MF	ENG	David Jones	46	1	1	0	2	1	49	2	8	0
15	DF	CAN	David Edgar	5 (12)	0	0	0	3 (1)	0	8 (13)	0	2	0
16	DF	ENG	Luke O'Neill	0	0	0	0	0	0	0	0	0	0
17	MF	ENG	~~George Porter~~ †	0	0	0	0	0	0	0	0	0	0
17	DF	NIR	Chris Baird	5 (2)	0	0	0	0	0	5 (2)	0	0	0
18	DF	ENG	Joseph Mills	0	0	0	0	0	0	0	0	0	0
19	MF	ENG	Michael Kightly *	32 (4)	5	0	0	0 (2)	0	32 (6)	5	1	0
20	MF	ENG	~~Marvin Bartley~~ †	0	0	0	0	0	0	0	0	0	0
22	MF	WAL	Brian Stock	2 (7)	0	0	0	1 (3)	0	3 (10)	0	1	0
23	FW	ENG	~~Charlie Austin~~ †	0	0	0	0	0	0	0	0	0	0
26	MF	IRL	Keith Treacy	9 (18)	2	1	0	3	0	13 (18)	2	1	1
28	DF	IRL	Kevin Long	5 (2)	0	1	1	3	0	9 (2)	1	0	0
30	FW	ENG	Ashley Barnes	11 (10)	3	0	0	0	0	11 (10)	3	1	0
32	MF	NZL	Cameron Howieson	0	0	0	0	0	0	0	0	0	0
33	MF	ENG	Steven Hewitt	0 (1)	0	0	0	0	0	0 (1)	0	0	0
34	DF	ENG	Tom Anderson	0	0	0	0	0	0	0	0	0	0
35	FW	ENG	~~Ryan Noble~~ †	0 (1)	0	0	0	0 (1)	0	0 (2)	0	0	0
37	MF	CAN	Scott Arfield	42 (3)	8	1	0	1 (2)	1	44 (5)	9	4	0
38	DF	NIR	Cameron Dummigan	0	0	0	0	0	0	0	0	0	0
39	FW	SCO	Jamie Frost	0	0	0	0	0	0	0	0	0	0
40	GK	ENG	Nick Liversedge	0	0	0	0	0	0	0	0	0	0
41	DF	ENG	Kyle Brownhill	0	0	0	0	0	0	0	0	0	0
42	MF	ENG	Micah Evans	0	0	0	0	0	0	0	0	0	0
43	DF	ENG	Alex Coleman	0	0	0	0	0	0	0	0	0	0
44	FW	ENG	Jason Gilchrist	0	0	0	0	0	0	0	0	0	0
45	DF	ENG	Jack Errington	0	0	0	0	0	0	0	0	0	0
46	MF	SCO	Archie Love	0	0	0	0	0	0	0	0	0	0
47	MF	IRL	Luke Gallagher	0	0	0	0	0	0	0	0	0	0
48	DF	NIR	Luke Conlan	0	0	0	0	0	0	0	0	0	0

== Transfers ==
=== In ===
Date	Name	From	Fee	Ref
1 July 2013	Tom Heaton	Bristol City	Free	
1 July 2013	Alex Cisak	Oldham Athletic	Free	
1 July 2013	Nick Liversedge	Whitby Town	Free	
1 July 2013	Joseph Mills	Reading	Free	
2 July 2013	Danijel Nizic	Sydney FC	Free	
19 July 2013	Scott Arfield	Huddersfield Town	Free	
19 July 2013	Ryan Noble	Sunderland	Free	
1 August 2013	David Jones	Wigan Athletic	Free	
13 August 2013	Kyle Brownhill	Stockport County	Free	
14 November 2013	Micah Evans	Unattached	Free	
10 January 2014	Ashley Barnes	Brighton & Hove Albion	Undisclosed	
20 March 2014	Chris Baird	Unattached	Free	

=== Out ===
Date	Name	To	Fee	Ref
1 July 2013	Brian Jensen	Bury	Released	
1 July 2013	Martin Paterson	Huddersfield Town	Released	
1 July 2013	Jon Stewart	Worksop Town	Released	
1 July 2013	Alex MacDonald	Burton Albion	Released	
1 July 2013	Wes Fletcher	York City	Released	
1 July 2013	Lee Grant	Derby County	Released	
1 July 2013	Chris McCann	Wigan Athletic	Released	
1 July 2013	Shay McCartan	Accrington Stanley	Released	
1 July 2013	Adam Evans	Inverness Caledonian Thistle	Released	
1 July 2013	Aryn Williams	Floreat Athena	Released	
1 July 2013	Joe Jackson	Workington	Released	
23 July 2013	Dane Richards	FK Bodø/Glimt	Released	
1 August 2013	Charlie Austin	Queens Park Rangers	Undisclosed	
13 January 2014	Ryan Noble	Gateshead	Free	
30 January 2014	Marvin Bartley	Leyton Orient	Released	
31 January 2014	George Porter	Rochdale	Released	

=== Loans in ===
Date	Name	From	End date	Ref
2 September 2013	Michael Kightly	Stoke City	30 July 2014	

=== Loans out ===
Date	Name	To	End date	Ref
18 July 2013	George Porter	AFC Wimbledon	24 January 2014	
1 August 2013	Marvin Bartley	Leyton Orient	30 January 2014	
16 August 2013	Joseph Mills	Oldham Athletic	23 November 2013	
20 September 2013	Nick Liversedge	Hyde	19 October 2013	
4 October 2013	Luke O'Neill	York City	3 January 2014	
8 November 2013	Archie Love	FC Halifax Town	10 January 2014	
26 November 2013	Micah Evans	Hereford United	10 January 2014	
27 November 2013	Tom Anderson	FC Halifax Town	10 January 2014	
17 January 2014	Luke O'Neill	Southend United	16 February 2014	
17 January 2014	Danijel Nizic	Workington	3 May 2014	
17 January 2014	Kyle Brownhill	Workington	3 May 2014	
31 January 2014	Joseph Mills	Shrewsbury Town	3 May 2014	
11 March 2014	Charlie Holt	Nelson	11 April 2014	

== See also ==
- List of Burnley F.C. seasons
