= 2011–12 Burnley F.C. season =

English football club season

Burnley
2011–12 season
- Chairman: Barry Kilby
- Manager: Eddie Howe
- Ground: Turf Moor
- Championship: 13th
- FA Cup: Third round
- League Cup: Fourth round
- Top goalscorer: League: Charlie Austin (16); All: Jay Rodriguez (21)
- Highest home attendance: 17,226 v Leeds United (19 November 2011)
- Lowest home attendance: 4,069 v Burton Albion (9 August 2011)
- Average home league attendance: 14,048
Home colours	Away colours

The 2011–12 season was Burnley's second consecutive season in the Championship. They also competed in the FA Cup and the League Cup.

== League table ==
Pos	Team	Pld	W	D	L	GF	GA	GD	Pts
11	Watford	46	16	16	14	56	64	−8	64
12	Derby County	46	18	10	18	50	58	−8	64
13	Burnley	46	17	11	18	61	58	+3	62
14	Leeds United	46	17	10	19	65	68	−3	61
15	Ipswich Town	46	17	10	19	69	77	−8	61

Updated to match(es) played on 28 April 2012. Source: BBC Sport
Rules for classification: 1) points; 2) goal difference; 3) number of goals scored.

== Match details ==
=== Football League Championship ===
Football League Championship match details
Date	League position	Opponents	Venue	Result	Score F–A	Scorers	Attendance	Ref
6 August 2011	8th	Watford	H	D	2–2	Austin 77', Treacy 84'	14,617	
13 August 2011	19th	Crystal Palace	A	L	0–2		13,167	
20 August 2011	21st	Cardiff City	H	D	1–1	Austin 2'	13,428	
27 August 2011	15th	Derby County	A	W	2–1	Austin (2) 49', 74'	23,913	
10 September 2011	19th	Middlesbrough	H	L	0–2		15,220	
17 September 2011	21st	Peterborough United	A	L	1–2	Treacy 45'	7,901	
24 September 2011	21st	Southampton	H	D	1–1	Austin 53'	14,170	
27 September 2011	16th	Nottingham Forest	H	W	5–1	Rodriguez (2) 5', 15', McCann 29', Wallace 44', Austin 71'	13,265	
1 October 2011	14th	Millwall	A	W	1–0	Rodriguez 37'	10,460	
15 October 2011	15th	Reading	H	L	0–1		13,664	
18 October 2011	17th	Barnsley	A	L	0–2		9,692	
22 October 2011	16th	Coventry City	A	W	2–1	Wallace 73', Austin 90+4'	12,785	
29 October 2011	15th	Blackpool	H	W	3–1	Austin 20', Wallace 29', Bartley 79'	15,614	
1 November 2011	17th	Leicester City	H	L	1–3	Wallace 23'	13,286	
5 November 2011	19th	Bristol City	A	L	1–3	Wallace 46'	12,187	
19 November 2011	21st	Leeds United	H	L	1–2	Rodriguez 10'	17,226	
22 November 2011	21st	Birmingham City	A	L	1–2	Bartley 49'	16,253	
26 November 2011	16th	Hull City	A	W	3–2	Edgar (2) 78', 82', Rodriguez 90+3'	20,238	
29 November 2011	14th	Ipswich Town	H	W	4–0	Vokes 33', McCann (2) 45', 66', Rodriguez 77'	12,499	
3 December 2011	10th	West Ham United	A	W	2–1	McCann 57', Vokes 75'	26,274	
10 December 2011	15th	Portsmouth	H	L	0–1		13,411	
17 December 2011	11th	Brighton & Hove Albion	A	W	1–0	Trippier 32'	19,641	
26 December 2011	9th	Doncaster Rovers	H	W	3–0	Rodriguez 37' pen., Paterson 84', Hird 90+5' o.g.	16,756	
31 December 2011	7th	Hull City	H	W	1–0	Paterson 34'	15,071	
2 January 2012	10th	Leeds United	A	L	1–2	Austin 69'	27,295	
14 January 2012	10th	Middlesbrough	A	W	2–0	Rodriguez 6', Trippier 28'	17,001	
21 January 2012	12th	Derby County	H	D	0–0		14,302	
31 January 2012	9th	Nottingham Forest	A	W	2–0	Rodriguez (2) 3', 64'	23,147	
4 February 2012	11th	Peterborough United	H	D	1–1	Rodriguez 87'	13,258	
11 February 2012	11th	Southampton	A	L	0–2		24,099	
14 February 2012	10th	Barnsley	H	W	2–0	Rodriguez 3', Austin 63'	12,355	
17 February 2012	10th	Reading	A	L	0–1		17,185	
25 February 2012	11th	Millwall	H	L	1–3	Rodriguez 90+3' pen.	13,000	
3 March 2012	12th	Watford	A	L	2–3	Rodriguez 41', Nosworthy 50' o.g.	11,612	
10 March 2012	13th	Crystal Palace	H	D	1–1	Rodriguez 2' pen.	13,216	
18 March 2012	14th	Cardiff City	A	D	0–0		21,276	
21 March 2012	16th	Ipswich Town	A	L	0–1		16,564	
24 March 2012	16th	West Ham United	H	D	2–2	Bartley 25', Paterson 36'	15,246	
31 March 2012	16th	Portsmouth	A	W	5–1	Trippier 16', Ings 47', Austin (3) 74', 90+3', 90+6'	15,739	
3 April 2012	16th	Birmingham City	H	L	1–3	Ings 74'	13,221	
6 April 2012	13th	Brighton & Hove Albion	H	W	1–0	Austin 23'	13,516	
9 April 2012	12th	Doncaster Rovers	A	W	2–1	McQuoid 36', Austin 76' pen.	8,350	
14 April 2012	11th	Coventry City	H	D	1–1	Austin 20'	13,398	
17 April 2012	11th	Leicester City	A	D	0–0		19,806	
17 April 2012	12th	Blackpool	A	L	0–4		14,141	
28 April 2012	13th	Bristol City	H	D	1–1	Ings 76'	13,369	

=== FA Cup ===
FA Cup match details
Round	Date	Opponents	Venue	Result	Score F–A	Scorers	Attendance	Ref
Third round	7 January 2012	Norwich City	A	L	1–4	Rodriguez 15'	22,898	

=== Football League Cup ===
Football League Cup match details
Round	Date	Opponents	Venue	Result	Score F–A	Scorers	Attendance	Ref
First round	9 August 2011	Burton Albion	H	W	6–3 (a.e.t.)	Rodriguez (4) 57' pen., 67' pen., 94', 107', Austin 83', Wallace 91'	4,069	
Second round	23 August 2011	Barnet	H	W	3–2 (a.e.t.)	Rodriguez 38', Elliott 64', McCann 105'	4,273	
Third round	20 September 2011	Milton Keynes Dons	H	W	2–1	Trippier 59', Bikey 89'	4,134	
Fourth round	25 October 2011	Cardiff City	A	L	0–1		11,601	

== Transfers ==
=== In ===
#	Pos	Player	From	Fee	Date
36	DF	(England) Ben Mee	Manchester City	Season-Long Loan	14 July 2011
2	DF	(England) Kieran Trippier	Manchester City	Season-Long Loan	26 July 2011
26	MF	(Republic of Ireland) Keith Treacy	Preston North End	Undisclosed	2 August 2011
30	GK	(England) Jon Stewart	Unattached	Free Transfer	3 August 2011
14	FW	(England) Danny Ings	Bournemouth	Undisclosed	15 August 2011
16	FW	(England) Zavon Hines	West Ham United	Undisclosed	18 August 2011
11	MF	(England) Junior Stanislas	West Ham United	Undisclosed	31 August 2011
19	FW	(Wales) Sam Vokes	Wolverhampton Wanderers	Loan	18 November 2011
2	DF	(England) Kieran Trippier	Manchester City	Undisclosed	3 January 2012
36	DF	(England) Ben Mee	Manchester City	Undisclosed	17 January 2012
19	FW	(Northern Ireland) Josh McQuoid	Millwall	Loan	20 January 2012
3	DF	(Northern Ireland) Daniel Lafferty	Derry City	Undisclosed	30 January 2012

=== Out ===
#	Pos	Player	To	Fee	Date
	MF	(Scotland) Kevin McDonald	Sheffield United	Released	12 May 2011
	FW	(Scotland) Steven Thompson	St Mirren	Released	12 May 2011
	MF	(Netherlands) Remco van der Schaaf	Randers	Free Transfer	1 July 2011
	MF	(England) Chris Anderson		Released	1 July 2011
	DF	(England) Chris Lynch		Released	1 July 2011
	MF	(England) Michael King		Released	1 July 2011
	DF	(England) Nik Kudiersky		Released	1 July 2011
	MF	(Scotland) Graham Alexander	Preston North End	Released	4 July 2011
40	DF	(England) Clarke Carlisle	Preston North End	Season-Long Loan	14 July 2011
	FW	(Scotland) Chris Iwelumo	Watford	Undisclosed	19 July 2011
	DF	(Jamaica) Tyrone Mears	Bolton Wanderers	Undisclosed	29 July 2011
	MF	(England) Chris Eagles	Bolton Wanderers	Undisclosed	29 July 2011
28	DF	(Republic of Ireland) Kevin Long	Accrington Stanley	Five-Month Loan	5 August 2011
3	DF	(Scotland) Danny Fox	Southampton	Undisclosed	11 August 2011
39	FW	(England) Wes Fletcher	Accrington Stanley	Five-Month Loan	15 August 2011
38	MF	(England) Alex-Ray Harvey	Fleetwood Town	One-Month Loan	19 August 2011
34	MF	(Scotland) Joe McKee	St Mirren	Five-Month Loan	24 August 2011
18	DF	(Guyana) Leon Cort	Charlton Athletic	Season-long Loan	29 August 2011
11	MF	(England) Wade Elliott	Birmingham City	Undisclosed	31 August 2011
	MF	(Republic of Ireland) Dave Lynch	Droylsden	Loan	5 October 2011
39	FW	(England) Wes Fletcher	Crewe Alexandra	Loan	25 November 2011
	MF	(Republic of Ireland) Dave Lynch	Stalybridge Celtic	Loan	9 January 2012
38	MF	(England) Alex-Ray Harvey	Barrow	Loan	10 January 2012
44	FW	(England) Joe Jackson	Barrow	Loan	10 January 2012
18	DF	(Guyana) Leon Cort		Released	10 January 2012
17	DF	(England) Richard Eckersley		Released	25 January 2012
28	DF	(Republic of Ireland) Kevin Long	Rochdale	Loan	27 January 2012
27	FW	(Scotland) Alex MacDonald	Plymouth Argyle	Loan	31 January 2012
40	DF	(England) Clarke Carlisle	Northampton Town	Loan	31 January 2012
	MF	(Republic of Ireland) Dave Lynch	Nantwich Town	Loan	10 February 2012
30	GK	(England) Jon Stewart	Alfreton Town	Loan	3 March 2012
	MF	(England) Ross Wilson	Silsden	Loan	12 March 2012
16	FW	(England) Zavon Hines	Bournemouth	Loan	22 March 2012
26	MF	(Republic of Ireland) Keith Treacy	Sheffield Wednesday	Loan	22 March 2012
21	DF	(Cameroon) André Amougou	Bristol City	Loan	22 March 2012

== Squads ==
=== First team squad ===
No.	Name	Nationality	Position (s)	Signed from
Goalkeepers
1	Lee Grant	(England)	GK	(England) Sheffield Wednesday
12	Brian Jensen	(Denmark)	GK	(England) West Bromwich Albion
30	Jon Stewart	(England)	GK	(England) Bournemouth
Defenders
2	Kieran Trippier	(England)	RB	(England) Manchester City
3	Daniel Lafferty	(Northern Ireland)	LB	(Northern Ireland) Derry City
4	Michael Duff	(Northern Ireland)	CB	(England) Cheltenham Town
15	David Edgar	(Canada)	CB	(England) Newcastle United
21	André Amougou	(Cameroon)	CB	(England) Reading
24	Brian Easton	(Scotland)	LB	(Scotland) Hamilton Academical
36	Ben Mee	(England)	CB	(England) Manchester City
Midfielders
6	Chris McCann (captain)	(Republic of Ireland)	CM	(Republic of Ireland) Home Farm
7	Ross Wallace	(Scotland)	LW / RW	(England) Preston North End
8	Dean Marney (vice-captain)	(England)	CM	(England) Hull City
11	Junior Stanislas	(England)	LW / RW	(England) West Ham United
20	Marvin Bartley	(England)	DM / CM	(England) Bournemouth
26	Keith Treacy	(Republic of Ireland)	LW / RW	(England) Preston North End
Forwards
9	Jay Rodriguez	(England)	ST / LW	(England) Burnley Centre of Excellence
10	Martin Paterson	(Northern Ireland)	ST / RW	(England) Scunthorpe United
14	Danny Ings	(England)	CF / ST	(England) Bournemouth
16	Zavon Hines	(England)	ST / LW / RW	(England) West Ham United
19	Josh McQuoid	(Northern Ireland)	CF / ST	(England) Millwall
23	Charlie Austin	(England)	ST / CF	(England) Swindon Town
27	Alex MacDonald	(Scotland)	ST	(England) Burnley Centre of Excellence

=== Development squad & Scholars ===
No.	Name	Nationality	Position (s)	Signed from
Defenders
28	Kevin Long	(Republic of Ireland)	CB	(Republic of Ireland) Cork City
Midfielders
32	Cameron Howieson	(New Zealand)	AM	(New Zealand) Mosgiel
33	Steven Hewitt	(England)	CM	(England) Burnley Centre of Excellence
38	Alex-Ray Harvey	(England)	CM	(England) Burnley Centre of Excellence
	Dave Lynch	(Republic of Ireland)	CM	(England) Burnley Centre of Excellence
Forwards
37	Dominic Knowles	(England)	ST	(England) Burnley Centre of Excellence
42	Shay McCartan	(Northern Ireland)	ST	(Northern Ireland) Glenavon
44	Joe Jackson	(England)	ST	(England) Burnley Centre of Excellence
	Mehdi Lazaar	(Belgium)	ST	(Belgium) R.R.F.C. Montegnée
	Ross Wilson	(England)	ST	(England) Burnley Centre of Excellence

== Coaching staff ==
Position	Name	Nationality
Manager:	Eddie Howe	(England) English
Assistant Manager:	Jason Tindall	(England) English
Development Squad:	Jason Blake	(England) English
Goalkeeping Coach:	Billy Mercer	(England) English
Chief Scout:	Tim Henderson	(England) English
Head Physiotherapist:	Alasdair Beattie	(England) English
Assistant Physiotherapists:	Luke Bussey	(England) English
	Andrew Schofield	(England) English
Director of Youth Development:	Martin Dobson	(England) English
Youth Team Coach:	Terry Pashley	(England) English
Centre of Excellence Manager:	Vince Overson	(England) English

== Statistics ==
Numbers in parentheses denote appearances as substitute.
Players with names struck through and marked † left the club during the playing season.
Players with names in italics and marked * were on loan from another club for the whole of their season with Burnley.
Players listed with no appearances have been in the matchday squad but only as unused substitutes.
Key to positions: GK – Goalkeeper; DF – Defender; MF – Midfielder; FW – Forward

No.	Pos.	Nat.	Name	League		FA Cup		League Cup		Total		Discipline	
No.	Pos.	Nat.	Name	Apps	Goals	Apps	Goals	Apps	Goals	Apps	Goals	A yellow rectangle, denoting the yellow penalty card shown to a player being cautioned	A red rectangle, denoting the red penalty card shown to a player being sent off
1	GK	ENG	Lee Grant	42 (1)	0	1	0	4	0	47 (1)	0	4	0
2	DF	ENG	Kieran Trippier	46	3	0	0	4	1	50	4	5	1
3	DF	SCO	~~Danny Fox~~ †	1	0	0	0	1	0	2	0	0	0
3	DF	NIR	Daniel Lafferty	5	0	0	0	0	0	5	0	1	0
4	DF	NIR	Michael Duff	30 (1)	0	0	0	1	0	31 (1)	0	7	0
6	MF	IRL	Chris McCann	45 (1)	4	1	0	2 (2)	1	48 (3)	5	6	0
7	MF	SCO	Ross Wallace	41 (3)	5	1	0	3 (1)	1	45 (4)	6	8	0
8	MF	ENG	Dean Marney	29 (8)	0	1	0	4	0	34 (8)	0	9	0
9	FW	ENG	Jay Rodriguez	36	15	1	1	4	5	41	21	4	0
10	FW	NIR	Martin Paterson	9 (5)	3	1	0	0	0	10 (5)	3	4	0
11	MF	ENG	~~Wade Elliott~~ †	2 (2)	0	0	0	2	1	4 (2)	1	1	0
11	MF	ENG	Junior Stanislas	25 (6)	0	0 (1)	0	0	0	25 (7)	0	1	0
12	GK	DEN	Brian Jensen	4	0	0	0	0	0	4	0	0	0
14	FW	ENG	Danny Ings	9 (6)	3	0	0	0	0	9 (6)	3	2	0
15	DF	CAN	David Edgar	44	2	1	0	2 (2)	0	47 (2)	2	5	0
16	FW	ENG	Zavon Hines	0 (13)	0	0	0	2 (1)	0	2 (14)	0	2	0
17	DF	ENG	~~Richard Eckersley~~ †	0	0	0	0	0	0	0	0	0	0
18	DF	GUY	~~Leon Cort~~ †	0	0	0	0	0	0	0	0	0	0
19	FW	WAL	~~Sam Vokes *~~ †	3 (6)	2	0	0	0	0	3 (6)	2	1	0
19	FW	NIR	~~Josh McQuoid *~~ †	9 (8)	1	0	0	0	0	9 (8)	1	0	0
20	MF	ENG	Marvin Bartley	24 (14)	3	0 (1)	0	1 (2)	0	25 (17)	3	4	1
21	DF	CMR	André Bikey	9 (5)	0	1	0	2	1	12 (5)	1	2	0
23	FW	ENG	Charlie Austin	30 (11)	16	1	0	2 (2)	1	33 (13)	17	2	0
24	DF	SCO	Brian Easton	17 (4)	0	1	0	3	0	21 (4)	0	3	0
26	MF	IRL	Keith Treacy	16 (8)	2	0	0	3	0	19 (8)	2	2	0
27	FW	SCO	Alex MacDonald	0 (5)	0	0 (1)	0	1	0	1 (6)	0	1	0
28	DF	IRL	Kevin Long	0	0	0	0	0	0	0	0	0	0
30	GK	ENG	Jon Stewart	0	0	0	0	0	0	0	0	0	0
32	MF	NZL	Cameron Howieson	0 (2)	0	0	0	0	0	0 (2)	0	0	0
33	MF	ENG	Steven Hewitt	0 (1)	0	0	0	0	0	0 (1)	0	0	0
34	MF	SCO	Joe McKee	0	0	0	0	0	0	0	0	0	0
35	MF	IRL	Adam Evans	0	0	0	0	0	0	0	0	0	0
36	DF	ENG	Ben Mee	29 (2)	0	1	0	3	0	33 (2)	0	4	0
37	FW	ENG	Dominic Knowles	0	0	0	0	0	0	0	0	0	0
38	MF	ENG	Alex-Ray Harvey	0	0	0	0	0	0	0	0	0	0
39	FW	ENG	Wes Fletcher	0	0	0	0	0 (1)	0	0 (1)	0	0	0
40	DF	ENG	Clarke Carlisle	0	0	0	0	0	0	0	0	0	0
42	FW	NIR	Shay McCartan	0 (1)	0	0	0	0	0	0 (1)	0	0	0
44	FW	ENG	Joe Jackson	0 (1)	0	0	0	0	0	0 (1)	0	0	0
45	GK	ENG	Ben Woodhead	0	0	0	0	0	0	0	0	0	0
