= 2012–13 Burnley F.C. season =

English football club season

Burnley
2012–13 season
- Chairman: John Banaszkiewicz; Mike Garlick
- Manager: Eddie Howe (until 12 October); Terry Pashley (caretaker manager); Sean Dyche (from 30 October)
- Ground: Turf Moor
- Championship: 11th
- FA Cup: Third round
- Football League Cup: Third round
- Top goalscorer: League: Charlie Austin (25); All: Charlie Austin (28)
- Highest home attendance: 21,341 v Blackburn Rovers (Championship, 2 December 2012)
- Lowest home attendance: 4,119 v Plymouth Argyle (League Cup, 28 August 2012)
- Average home league attendance: 12,928
Home colours	Away colours

The 2012–13 season was Burnley's third consecutive season in the Championship. They also competed in the FA Cup and the League Cup.

== Match details ==
=== Football League Championship ===
==== League table ====
Pos	Team	Pld	W	D	L	GF	GA	GD	Pts
9	Charlton Athletic	46	17	14	15	65	59	+6	65
10	Derby County	46	16	13	17	65	62	+3	61
11	Burnley	46	16	13	17	62	60	+2	61
12	Birmingham City	46	15	16	15	63	69	−6	61
13	Leeds United	46	17	10	19	57	66	−9	61

Updated to match(es) played on 4 May 2013. Source: BBC Sport
Rules for classification: 1) points; 2) goal difference; 3) number of goals scored.

==== Matches ====
Date	League position	Opponents	Venue	Result	Score F–A	Scorers	Attendance	Ref
18 August 2012	1st	Bolton Wanderers	H	W	2–0	Paterson 39', Austin 56'	18,407	
21 August 2012	8th	Middlesbrough	A	L	2–3	Austin 41', Stanislas 86'	15,559	
25 August 2012	18th	Huddersfield Town	A	L	0–2		15,483	
1 September 2012	22nd	Brighton & Hove Albion	H	L	1–3	Greer 60' o.g.	11,413	
15 September 2012	15th	Peterborough United	H	W	5–2	McCann 7', Bostwick 39' o.g., Austin (2) 74', 81' pen., Stanislas 86'	10,979	
19 September 2012	19th	Leicester City	A	L	1–2	Marney 10'	18,480	
22 September 2012	16th	Derby County	A	W	2–1	Austin (2) 32', 89'	21,347	
29 September 2012	16th	Millwall	H	D	2–2	Mee 19', Austin 43'	11,192	
2 October 2012	15th	Sheffield Wednesday	H	D	3–3	Austin (3) 22', 38', 84'	12,122	
6 October 2012	16th	Crystal Palace	A	L	3–4	McCann 26', Paterson 29', Austin 81'	20,863	
20 October 2012	15th	Blackpool	H	W	1–0	Austin 19'	12,925	
23 October 2012	14th	Bristol City	A	W	4–3	Austin (2) 9', 59' pen., Paterson 60', McCann 90'	11,836	
27 October 2012	14th	Cardiff City	A	L	0–4		21,191	
3 November 2012	13th	Wolverhampton Wanderers	H	W	2–0	Paterson 18', Austin 53'	12,295	
6 November 2012	10th	Leeds United	H	W	1–0	Austin 83'	14,470	
10 November 2012	13th	Ipswich Town	A	L	1–2	Vokes 80'	16,297	
17 November 2012	15th	Charlton Athletic	H	L	0–1		11,405	
24 November 2012	13th	Hull City	A	W	1–0	Marney 40'	17,782	
27 November 2012	14th	Barnsley	A	D	1–1	Austin 5'	8,610	
2 December 2012	14th	Blackburn Rovers	H	D	1–1	Vokes 89'	21,341	
8 December 2012	17th	Nottingham Forest	A	L	0–2		19,672	
15 December 2012	16th	Watford	H	D	1–1	Austin 27' pen.	14,896	
22 December 2012	14th	Birmingham City	A	D	2–2	Ings 66', Wallace 68'	17,284	
26 December 2012	13th	Derby County	H	W	2–0	Austin 40', Duff 74'	13,779	
29 December 2012	13th	Leicester City	H	L	0–1		13,050	
1 January 2013	12th	Sheffield Wednesday	A	W	2–0	Treacy 64', Wallace 77' pen.	23,677	
12 January 2013	10th	Crystal Palace	H	W	1–0	Stanislas 81'	11,564	
19 January 2013	7th	Millwall	A	W	2–0	Vokes 19', Ings 59'	9,384	
26 January 2013	8th	Birmingham City	H	L	1–2	Wallace 56' pen.	11,576	
2 February 2013	7th	Peterborough United	A	D	2–2	Austin 1', Paterson 85'	6,648	
9 February 2013	9th	Bolton Wanderers	A	L	1–2	Edgar 55'	19,767	
19 February 2013	11th	Middlesbrough	H	D	0–0		12,394	
23 February 2013	12th	Brighton & Hove Albion	A	L	0–1		25,836	
26 February 2013	13th	Huddersfield Town	H	L	0–1		11,266	
2 March 2013	11th	Charlton Athletic	A	W	1–0	Austin 43'	20,065	
5 March 2013	11th	Barnsley	H	D	1–1	Austin 9'	10,584	
11 March 2013	11th	Hull City	H	L	0–1		10,450	
17 March 2013	11th	Blackburn Rovers	A	D	1–1	Shackell 32'	20,735	
29 March 2013	13th	Watford	A	D	3–3	Austin (2) 1', 24' pen., Vokes 90+3'	15,435	
1 April 2013	13th	Nottingham Forest	H	D	1–1	Stanislas 68'	13,618	
6 April 2013	11th	Bristol City	H	W	3–1	Shackell 52', McCann 61', Paterson 90+1'	11,539	
13 April 2013	14th	Blackpool	A	L	0–1		14,437	
16 April 2013	17th	Leeds United	A	L	0–1		16,788	
20 April 2013	15th	Cardiff City	H	D	1–1	Edgar 90+1'	13,264	
27 April 2013	14th	Wolverhampton Wanderers	A	W	2–1	Ings 8', Paterson 53'	24,199	
4 May 2013	11th	Ipswich Town	H	W	2–0	Stanislas 60', Paterson 86'	12,820	

=== FA Cup ===
Round	Date	Opponents	Venue	Result	Score F–A	Scorers	Attendance	Ref
Third round	5 January 2013	Barnsley	A	L	0–1		5,091	

=== Football League Cup ===
Round	Date	Opponents	Venue	Result	Score F–A	Scorers	Attendance	Ref
First round	14 August 2012	Port Vale	A	W	3–1	McCann 11', Austin 29', Marney 42'	4,055	
Second round	28 August 2012	Plymouth Argyle	H	D	1–1 (a.e.t.) (3–2 p)	Austin 37'	4,119	
Third round	25 September 2012	Swindon Town	A	L	1–3	Austin 74'	7,353	

== Statistics ==
Numbers in parentheses denote appearances as substitute.
Players with names struck through and marked † left the club during the playing season.
Players with names in italics and marked * were on loan from another club for the whole of their season with Burnley.
Players listed with no appearances have been in the matchday squad but only as unused substitutes.
Key to positions: GK – Goalkeeper; DF – Defender; MF – Midfielder; FW – Forward

No.	Pos.	Nat.	Name	League		FA Cup		League Cup		Total		Discipline	
No.	Pos.	Nat.	Name	Apps	Goals	Apps	Goals	Apps	Goals	Apps	Goals	A yellow rectangle, denoting the yellow penalty card shown to a player being cautioned	A red rectangle, denoting the red penalty card shown to a player being sent off
1	GK	ENG	Lee Grant	46	0	0	0	1	0	47	0	2	0
2	DF	ENG	Kieran Trippier	45	0	1	0	2	0	48	0	6	1
3	DF	NIR	Daniel Lafferty	22 (2)	0	1	0	1	0	24 (2)	0	3	0
4	DF	NIR	Michael Duff	23 (1)	1	1	0	2 (1)	0	26 (2)	1	7	1
5	DF	ENG	Jason Shackell (C)	44	2	1	0	1	0	46	2	4	0
6	MF	IRL	Chris McCann	40 (1)	4	0	0	2	1	42 (1)	5	9	0
7	MF	SCO	Ross Wallace	33 (3)	3	1	0	2 (1)	0	36 (4)	3	9	0
8	MF	ENG	Dean Marney	38	2	1	0	1 (1)	1	40 (1)	3	12	1
9	FW	WAL	Sam Vokes	13 (33)	4	1	0	0 (2)	0	14 (35)	4	4	0
10	FW	NIR	Martin Paterson	28 (11)	8	0	0	0	0	28 (11)	8	7	0
11	MF	ENG	Junior Stanislas	27 (8)	5	0	0	1 (1)	0	28 (9)	5	0	0
12	GK	DEN	Brian Jensen	0 (1)	0	1	0	2	0	3 (1)	0	0	0
14	FW	ENG	Danny Ings	15 (17)	3	1	0	0	0	16 (17)	3	2	0
15	DF	CAN	David Edgar	20 (7)	2	0 (1)	0	2	0	22 (8)	2	1	0
16	DF	ENG	Luke O'Neill	0 (1)	0	0	0	1	0	1 (1)	0	0	0
17	MF	ENG	George Porter	0	0	0	0	0	0	0	0	0	0
18	DF	ENG	Joseph Mills *	9 (1)	0	0	0	2	0	11 (1)	0	5	0
19	MF	ENG	~~Cameron Stewart *~~ †	2 (7)	0	0	0	0	0	2 (7)	0	0	0
19	MF	SWE	~~Alexander Kačaniklić *~~ †	6	0	0	0	0	0	6	0	0	0
20	MF	ENG	Marvin Bartley	8 (13)	0	0 (1)	0	2	0	10 (14)	0	3	0
21	MF	JAM	Dane Richards	0 (1)	0	0 (1)	0	0	0	0 (2)	0	0	0
22	MF	WAL	Brian Stock	19 (6)	0	1	0	3	0	23 (6)	0	4	1
23	FW	ENG	Charlie Austin	37	25	1	0	3	3	40	28	6	0
26	MF	IRL	Keith Treacy	4 (11)	1	1	0	1	0	6 (11)	1	3	0
27	FW	SCO	Alex MacDonald	0 (1)	0	0	0	1	0	1 (1)	0	0	0
28	DF	IRL	Kevin Long	13 (1)	0	0	0	0	0	13 (1)	0	2	0
30	GK	ENG	Jon Stewart	0	0	0	0	0	0	0	0	0	0
32	MF	NZL	Cameron Howieson	0	0	0	0	0	0	0	0	0	0
33	MF	ENG	Steven Hewitt	0	0	0	0	1	0	1	0	0	0
34	DF	ENG	Tom Anderson	0	0	0	0	0	0	0	0	0	0
36	DF	ENG	Ben Mee	16 (3)	1	0	0	2	0	18 (3)	1	8	1
39	FW	ENG	Wes Fletcher	0	0	0	0	0	0	0	0	0	0
40	FW	ENG	Joe Jackson	0	0	0	0	0	0	0	0	0	0
42	FW	NIR	Shay McCartan	0	0	0	0	0	0	0	0	0	0

== Coaching staff ==
Position	Name	Nationality
Manager:	Sean Dyche	(England) English
Assistant manager:	Ian Woan	(England) English
First Team Coach:	Tony Loughlan	(England) English
Development Squad:	Jason Blake	(England) English
Goalkeeping coach:	Billy Mercer	(England) English
Chief scout:	Tim Henderson	(England) English
Head physiotherapist:	Alasdair Beattie	(England) English
Physiotherapist:	Pablo Sanchez	(Spain) Spanish
Academy director:	Jason Blake	(England) English
Academy head coach:	Terry Pashley	(England) English
Academy Assistant Coach:	Andy Farrell	(England) English
Head of Youth Recruitment:	Jeff Taylor	(England) English

== Transfers ==
=== In ===
#	Pos	Player	From	Fee	Date
16	DF	(England) Luke O'Neill	Mansfield Town	Undisclosed	15 June 2012
17	MF	(England) George Porter	Leyton Orient	Undisclosed	3 July 2012
5	DF	(England) Jason Shackell	Derby County	Undisclosed	5 July 2012
18	DF	(England) Joseph Mills	Reading	Season-long loan	17 July 2012
9	FW	(Wales) Sam Vokes	Wolverhampton Wanderers	Undisclosed	31 July 2012
22	MF	(Wales) Brian Stock	Doncaster Rovers	Undisclosed	11 August 2012
19	MF	(England) Cameron Stewart	Hull City	Loan	31 August 2012
21	MF	(Jamaica) Dane Richards	Vancouver Whitecaps	Undisclosed	1 January 2013
19	MF	(Sweden) Alexander Kačaniklić	Fulham	Loan	1 March 2013

=== Out ===
#	Pos	Player	To	Fee	Date
	MF	(England) Alex-Ray Harvey		Released	8 May 2012
	FW	(England) Dominic Knowles		Released	8 May 2012
	MF	(Republic of Ireland) Dave Lynch		Released	8 May 2012
	FW	(England) Ross Wilson		Released	8 May 2012
	DF	(Cameroon) André Amougou		Released	18 May 2012
	DF	(England) Clarke Carlisle		Released	18 May 2012
	DF	(Scotland) Brian Easton		Released	18 May 2012
	FW	(England) Jay Rodriguez	Southampton	Undisclosed	10 June 2012
	FW	(England) Zavon Hines		Released	17 July 2012
34	DF	(England) Tom Anderson	Barrow	Loan	8 August 2012
40	FW	(England) Joe Jackson	Barrow	Loan	8 August 2012
28	DF	(Republic of Ireland) Kevin Long	Portsmouth	Loan	18 August 2012
27	FW	(Scotland) Alex MacDonald	Plymouth Argyle	Loan	31 August 2012
30	GK	(England) Jon Stewart	Alfreton Town	Loan	31 August 2012
	DF	(England) Alex Coleman	Droylsden	Loan	7 September 2012
	MF	(Republic of Ireland) Adam Evans	Droylsden	Loan	15 September 2012
	FW	(Belgium) Mehdi Lazaar		Released	31 December 2012
17	MF	(England) George Porter	Colchester United	Loan	1 January 2013
42	FW	(Northern Ireland) Shay McCartan	Hyde	Loan	31 January 2013
33	MF	(England) Steven Hewitt	Alfreton Town	Loan	31 January 2013
27	FW	(Scotland) Alex MacDonald	Burton Albion	Loan	31 January 2013
34	DF	(England) Tom Anderson	Hyde	Loan	8 February 2013
32	MF	(New Zealand) Cameron Howieson	Doncaster Rovers	Loan	21 February 2013
39	MF	(England) Wes Fletcher	Yeovil Town	Loan	28 February 2013
	MF	(Republic of Ireland) Luke Gallagher	Droylsden	Loan	8 March 2013
	FW	(England) Jason Gilchrist	Droylsden	Loan	8 March 2013
21	MF	(Jamaica) Dane Richards	FK Bodø/Glimt	Loan	4 April 2013
