= Keith Treacy =

Irish footballer (born 1988)

Personal information
- Full name: Keith Patrick Treacy
- Date of birth: 13 September 1988 (age 38)
- Place of birth: Dublin, Ireland
- Positions: Winger; central midfielder

Youth career
- –2003: Belvedere
- 2003–2006: Blackburn Rovers

Senior career*
Years	Team	Apps	(Gls)
2006–2010	Blackburn Rovers	12	(0)
2006	→ Stockport County (loan)	4	(0)
2009	→ Sheffield United (loan)	16	(1)
2010–2011	Preston North End	55	(9)
2011–2014	Burnley	66	(5)
2012	→ Sheffield Wednesday (loan)	7	(1)
2014–2015	Barnsley	12	(1)
2015	Drogheda United	8	(2)
2016	St Patrick's Athletic	14	(1)
Total		194	(20)

International career
2004–2005	Republic of Ireland U17	5	(0)
2006	Republic of Ireland U18	1	(0)
2005–2007	Republic of Ireland U19	13	(1)
2007–2009	Republic of Ireland U21	9	(1)
2010–2011	Republic of Ireland	6	(0)
- * Club domestic league appearances and goals

Keith Patrick Treacy (born 13 September 1988) is an Irish former footballer who was a Republic of Ireland international and who last played for St Patrick's Athletic. He spent his youth at Belvedere and began his professional career at Blackburn Rovers. Treacy has also played for Stockport County, Sheffield United, Preston North End, Burnley, Sheffield Wednesday, Barnsley, Drogheda United and St Patrick's Athletic.

== Club career ==
=== Blackburn Rovers ===
Born in Dublin, Ireland, Treacy started playing football with his local team Belvedere, before signing his first professional contract in 2005, keeping him until 2008.

On 23 November 2006, Treacy joined Stockport County on a one-month loan deal. He made his Stockport County debut, in a 1–1 draw against Macclesfield Town on 25 November 2006. After ending his loan spell at Stockport County, making four appearances, Treacy signed a new contract with the club on 12 June 2007, keeping him until 2011.

After signing a new contract with the club, Treacy was promoted to the Blackburn Rovers' first team ahead of the 2007–08 season. It was not until on 31 October 2007 when he made his debut for the club in a League Cup tie against Portsmouth as a substitute, as Blackburn Rovers won 2–1. Two months on 5 January 2008, Treacy made his first start against Coventry City in the FA Cup third round in a 4–1 defeat back on 5 January 2008, before being substituted off and replaced by striker Matt Derbyshire. He went on to make two appearances at the end of the 2007–08 season.

At the start of the 2008–09 season, Treacy was called up to the first team under the new management of Paul Ince. He then made his league debut for Blackburn Rovers in the opening game of the season, in a 3–2 win over Everton on 16 August 2008. Treacy found his playing time in the league, mostly coming from the substitute bench. At times, he was given starts in a number of matches for the side. Treacy went on to make twelve appearances throughout the 2008–09 season. Reflecting on his performance, local newspaper Lancashire Telegraph commented about the player, saying: "Next season will be an important season for the young Irishman after a disappointing campaign this time round. A hot prospect as he came through Rovers' youth ranks, has never really transformed that into first team ability. A direct and powerful runner, who has again showed his potential, but will need to deliver in earnest next season."

In July 2009, Treacy joined Sheffield United on a six-month loan deal, making his début for the club in a 0–0 draw with Middlesbrough on the first day of the 2009–2010 season. He soon followed his debut up with two assists for the Blades against Watford the following week and a stunning long range goal three days later in a midweek match against Leicester City. Since joining the club, Treacy started the season as a regular in the Blades side despite facing an injury that almost saw him sidelined for six months. By November, he had dropped out of the team and terminated his loan stay early to return to Blackburn in mid-December

Upon returning to his parent club, Treacy was soon placed on the transfer list in the January transfer window. Treacy later talked about his time at Blackburn Rovers, stating that only Manager Paul Ince have confidence in him and that under the management of Sam Allardyce lead Treacy considered quitting football.

=== Preston North End ===
Treacy signed a 2 1/2-year contract with an option of a further year with Preston North End on 1 February 2010. Following his move to the club, he defended his move to Blackburn's arch-rivals, Preston North End, was only for to play football.

Treacy made his Preston North End debut, coming on as a 56th-minute substitute, in a 4–1 loss against Barnsley on 2 February 2010. After missing two matches due to injury, he returned to the first team against Watford on 3 April 2010, coming on as a 38th-minute substitute, and set up the equalising goal, in a 1–1 draw. This was followed up by scoring his first goal for the Lancashire outfit in a 3–1 defeat Crystal Palace on 5 April 2010, and another came against over Scunthorpe United five days later, as well as, setting up one of the goals, in a 3–2 win. In the second half of the season at Preston North End, Treacy scored twice in seventeen appearances. A few weeks after the 2009–10 season, he had a successful operation on his hernia.

At the start of the 2010–11 season, Treacy started things well when he scored the winning goal in a 2–1 win over Bradford City. In the local-rivalry against Burnley on 11 September 2010, Treacy scored and provided an assist for Jon Parkin, in a 4–3 loss. He scored his second League Cup goal of the season on 22 September 2010, in a 2–1 loss against Wigan Athletic, eliminating Preston North End from the League Cup. Treacy then scored two goals in two consecutive matches between 28 September 2010 and 2 October 2010 against Leeds United and Reading. However, in a match against Derby County on 16 October 2010, he was sent–off for a second bookable offence after giving away a penalty at the last minutes, as the club lost 3–0. After serving a one match suspension, Treacy returned to the starting line–up against Crystal Palace on 23 October 2010, and "fired home from all of 35 yards for his sixth goal of the season", in a 4–3 win. His goal against Crystal Palace later earned him Goal of The Season Award at Preston North End's Award Ceremony. Since joining the club, he continued to regain his first team place throughout the 2010–11 season. Treacy then provided seven assists in nine matches between 15 February 2011 and 19 March 2011. During which, he scored his first goal in five months against Scunthorpe United, in a 3–0 win on 15 March 2011. A month later on 16 April 2011, Treacy scored a brace, in a 3–1 win against his old club, Sheffield United. However, Preston North End were relegated to League One, following a dismal season with only 42 points. Even though Preston North End were relegated to League One, Treacy finished the 2010–11 season with and making forty-one appearances and scoring nine times in all competitions.

Following Preston North End relegation to League One, Treacy announced his intention to leave the club, stating he prefer to play in higher level than League One. Manager Phil Brown later confirmed that four clubs were keen to sign him, though the bid is yet to be made.

=== Burnley ===
On 31 July 2011, Burnley confirmed that they had had an offer for Treacy accepted and that he would discuss personal terms with the Clarets. A day later, he signed a three-year deal after completing a medical.

He scored on his debut for the club, coming on as a substitute on the 65th minute against Watford, in a 2–2 draw at Turf Moor. After scoring on his debut, Manager Eddie Howe praised Treacy's performance. His second later came on 17 September 2011, in a 2–1 loss against Peterborough United. Unfortunately, Treacy suffered a hamstring injury in training that kept him out for two weeks. It was not until on 1 October 2011 when he made his return against Millwall, coming on as a substitute for Marvin Bartley in a 1–0 loss. Since joining Burnley, Treacy became a first team regular for Burnley, playing in the midfield position. He then provided a double assist on 29 November 2011, in a 4–0 win over Ipswich Town. However, Treacy's form and fitness began to falter, resulting him not being in the starting line-up, prompting Manager Howe insisted Treacy remained at the club throughout the transfer window. By the time he was loaned out to Sheffield Wednesday, Treacy went on to make twenty–seven appearances and scoring two times for Burnley at the end of the 2011–12 season.

Manager Howe expected Treacy to return to Burnley's pre-season training ahead of the 2012–13 season, having given him a second chance in the first team. However, he missed the first two games due to a groin injury. Treacy made his first appearance since returning from a loan spell at Sheffield Wednesday, coming on as a substitute for Joseph Mills in the 73rd minute, in a 2–0 loss against Huddersfield Town on 25 August 2012. However, his poor performance against Plymouth Argyle in the second round of the League Cup led Manager Howe to send him to the club's Development Squad. After spending months at Burnley's Development Squad, he was recalled to the first team under the new management of Sean Dyche It was not until on 15 December 2012 when Treacy made his first team return, coming on as a substitute for Danny Ings in a 1–1 draw against Watford. He then started his first game in a year for Burnley in the 1–0 defeat against Leicester City on 29 December 2012. This was followed up by scoring the opening goal in a 2–0 win against Sheffield Wednesday on the first day of 2013. After the match, Treacy praised Dyche for giving him a second chance at Burnley. His first team return saw him in and out of the starting line–up for the club. At the end of the 2012–13 season, he went on to make seventeen appearances and scoring once in all competitions.

Treacy started the season well when he scored his first goal of the season and his first appearance of the 2013–14 season, just three minutes after coming on as a substitute, in a 3–0 win over Yeovil Town on 17 August 2013. After the match, Treacy praised Dyche for putting his career on track and credited the fitness coach Mark Howard for helping him lose weight and improving his physique. Treacy then set up a goal for Jason Shackell on 31 August 2013, in a 3–0 win over Derby County. However throughout the 2013–14 season, Treacy's first team was largely restricted to substitute appearances, due to strong competitions in Burnley's midfield positions. He also faced sidelined, including a suspension following his sending off against West Ham United in the fourth round of the EFL Cup on 29 October 2013, as the club lost 2–0. Treacy's second goal later came on 15 February 2014, in a 1–1 draw against AFC Bournemouth. His contributions helped Burnley gain promotion to the Premier League for the first time since 2009. At the end of the 2013–14 season, he went on to make thirty–one appearances and scoring once in all competitions.

Despite keen on signing a contract with the club, Treacy was released by Burnley, having remained a fringe player in the first team squad under managers Eddie Howe and Sean Dyche.

==== Loan Spell at Sheffield Wednesday ====
In effort to boost chance to make to the Ireland Squad for UEFA Euro 2012, Treacy joined Sheffield Wednesday on loan until the end of the season.

He made his debut for the club two days later, coming on as a substitute for Jermaine Johnson in the 78th minute, in a 1–0 win over Leyton Orient. After making appearance, mostly from coming on the bench, Treacy scored his first Sheffield Wednesday goal, coming from a direct free kick and provided a winning goal, in a 2–1 win over Brentford on 28 April 2012. His contributions at the club saw the Owls' promotion back to the Championship during the 2011–12 season. After scoring once in seven appearances, Treacy hinted he could turn his loan move from the club into a permanent basis. However, Sheffield Wednesday was not keen on signing him on a permanent basis and returned to his parent club.

=== Barnsley ===
On 6 August 2014, Treacy was announced to have signed for League One team Barnsley on a two-year contract.

Treacy made his debut for the club in the opening game of the season, coming on as a substitute for Danny Rose in the 66th minute, in a 1–0 loss against Crawley Town. Unfortunately, Tracey's start to his Barnsley's career went bad after needing rehabilitation. Treacy then scored his first Barnsley goal on 22 November 2014, in a 2–1 loss against Chesterfield. However, just six months into his contract, he left Barnsley by mutual consent in January 2015, after he had made 16 appearances.

=== Drogheda United ===
Treacy returned to Ireland and joined struggling Premier Division side Drogheda United midway through the season. He made his debut for the club, starting a match and played 64 minutes before being substituted, in a 4–1 loss against Limerick on 28 August 2015. It was not until on 25 September 2015 when Treacy scored his first goal for Drogheda United, in a 2–2 draw against Bohemians. This was followed up by scoring his second goal for the club, in a 1–1 draw against Cork City. However, his two goals in eight games was not enough to help his side avoid being relegated on the final day of the season.

=== St Patrick's Athletic ===
Treacy left Drogheda United to sign for another Premier Division side, St Patrick's Athletic on a one-year contract. He made his debut for the club, coming on as a 53rd-minute substitute, in a 1–0 win against Longford Town on 11 March 2016. Treacy played 14 league games for the Saints through the season, scoring one goal away to Derry City. He featured in all 4 games in the club's UEFA Europa League campaign and once set up a goal for the Saints in a 2–1 loss against Jeunesse Esch in the second leg of the UEFA Europa League first qualifying round. However, due to injuries, Treacy was not in the squad for the League Cup Final as Pats beat Limerick 4–1 to retain the trophy. At the end of the 2016 season, he went on to make eighteen appearances and scoring once for the club. Following this, St Patrick's Athletic released Treacy upon expiry of his contract.

=== Retirement ===
On 29 November 2016, Treacy came out and spoke to the media about how 'Depression has been an issue for all of my career', his struggles with it through 2016 and how he was eyeing a possible comeback to the game in 2017.

On 20 August 2019, Treacy spoke about his desire to return to playing League of Ireland football.

== International career ==
=== Youth career ===
In April 2004, Treacy was called up to the Republic of Ireland U17. He went to make four appearances for the U17 side, including the Toyota International Youth Tournament.

In August 2005, Treacy was called up to the Republic of Ireland U19 for the first time. He made his U19 side debut, starting the whole game, in a 2–0 loss against Czech Republic U19 on 2 October 2005. Treacy then scored his first Republic of Ireland U19 goal, in a 2–1 win against Ukraine U19 at Terryland Park on 15 August 2006. He went on to make thirteen appearances and scoring once for the U19 side.

Treacy was called up to the Republic of Ireland under-21 team in September 2007 but injuries prevented him from taking his place until November 2007. He made his U21 debut, starting the whole game, in a 1–0 loss against Montenegro U21 on 16 November 2007. However, Treacy suffered a hamstring injury in training ahead of the match and didn't play for the Republic of Ireland U21 for another nine months. In August 2008, he was then called up to the U21 side and was given the captaincy for the first time. Treacy scored his only goal at this level on 20 August 2008 in a 1–1 draw against Austria U21. After spending a year without the U21 side call–up following a fallen out with Don Givens, he was called up to Ireland U21 and made two more appearances by the end of 2009. Treacy went on to make nine appearances and scoring once for the U21 side.

=== Senior career ===
In July 2010, Treacy was called up to the Republic of Ireland for the first time. On 11 August 2010, he made his senior international début for the national side against Argentina, coming on as a substitute in the second half for Keith Fahey in the first international at the new Aviva Stadium in Dublin.

In May 2011, Treacy was called up to Republic of Ireland squad once again, earning his call up for the first time in six months. On 24 May 2011, he earned a starting place winning his third cap with an impressive display in the 2011 Nations Cup game against rivals Northern Ireland. Treacy then appeared three more times for the national side by the end of the year. He went on to make six appearances for Republic of Ireland.

== Career statistics ==
=== Club ===
As of 20 February 2017.

Club statistics
Club	Season	League			Cup		League Cup		Other		Total	
Club	Season	Division	Apps	Goals	Apps	Goals	Apps	Goals	Apps	Goals	Apps	Goals
Stockport County (loan)	2006–07	EFL League Two	4	0	0	0	0	0	0	0	4	0
Blackburn Rovers	2007–08	Premier League	0	0	1	0	1	0	0	0	2	0
Blackburn Rovers	2008–09	Premier League	12	0	4	0	4	0	—		20	0
Blackburn Rovers	Blackburn Rovers Total		12	0	5	0	5	0	0	0	22	0
Sheffield United (loan)	2009–10	EFL Championship	16	1	0	0	1	0	—		17	1
Preston North End	2009–10	EFL Championship	17	2	0	0	0	0	—		17	2
Preston North End	2010–11	EFL Championship	38	7	1	0	2	2	—		41	9
Preston North End	Preston North End Total		55	9	1	0	2	2	—		58	11
Burnley	2011–12	EFL Championship	24	2	0	0	3	0	—		27	2
Burnley	2012–13	EFL Championship	15	1	1	0	1	0	—		17	1
Burnley	2013–14	EFL Championship	27	2	1	0	3	0	—		31	2
Burnley	Burnley Total		66	5	2	0	7	0	—		75	5
Sheffield Wednesday (loan)	2011–12	EFL League One	7	1	0	0	0	0	0	0	7	1
Barnsley	2014–15	EFL League One	12	1	2	0	1	0	1 (Note: Appearance in Football League Trophy)	0	16	1
Drogheda United	2015	League of Ireland Premier Division	8	2	0	0	0	0	0	0	8	2
St Patrick's Athletic	2016	League of Ireland Premier Division	14	1	1	0	2	0	4 (Note: Appearances in UEFA Europa League)	0	21	1
Career total			194	20	11	0	18	2	5	0	228	22

=== International ===
As of match played 10 August 2011.

International statistics
National team	Year	Apps	Goals
Republic of Ireland	2010	1	0
Republic of Ireland	2011	5	0
Total		6	0

== Personal life ==
On 12 October 2014, Treacy married his long-term girlfriend in Ireland, causing him to miss the Yorkshire derby against Bradford City. Together, they have two children.

On 29 November 2016, Treacy opened up about his struggles with depression throughout his football career. In August 2019, he spoke about his previous struggles with alcoholism during his career. A year later, Treacy continued to speak out about his struggles, saying his aim is to help footballers, who were let down by the football industry.

== Honours ==
Sheffield Wednesday

- Football League One (1): 2011–2012 (runner-up)

Burnley

- Football League Championship (1): 2013–2014 (runner-up)

St Patrick's Athletic

- League of Ireland Cup (1): 2016

Republic of Ireland

- Nations Cup: 2011

Awards

- FAI U-19 Player of The Year (1): 2007
- FAI U-16 Player of The Year (1): 2004
