= Kevin Long (footballer) =

Irish footballer

Personal information
- Full name: Kevin Finbarr Long
- Date of birth: 18 August 1990 (age 36)
- Place of birth: Cork, Ireland
- Height: 1.88 m (6 ft 2 in)
- Position: Defender

Team information
- Current team: Cork City
- Number: 13

Youth career
- 2007–2009: Cork City

Senior career*
Years	Team	Apps	(Gls)
2008–2009	Cork City	16	(1)
2010–2023	Burnley	69	(1)
2010–2011	→ Accrington Stanley (loan)	15	(0)
2011–2012	→ Accrington Stanley (loan)	24	(4)
2012	→ Rochdale (loan)	16	(0)
2012	→ Portsmouth (loan)	5	(0)
2015–2016	→ Barnsley (loan)	11	(2)
2016	→ Milton Keynes Dons (loan)	2	(0)
2023–2024	Birmingham City	34	(1)
2024–2025	Toronto FC	50	(0)
2026	Waterford	26	(2)
2026–	Cork City	0	(0)

International career
2017–2020	Republic of Ireland	17	(1)
- * Club domestic league appearances and goals as of 20:09, 11 November 2026 (UTC)

Kevin Finbarr Long (born 18 August 1990) is an Irish professional footballer who plays as a defender for League of Ireland Premier Division club Cork City.

Long began his career with Cork City before joining Burnley in 2010 as a 19-year-old. He never established himself as a regular in the Burnley side, and spent several spells out on loan, before leaving the club in 2023 to sign for Birmingham City. He moved on to Toronto FC in February 2024. After spending the 2026 season with Waterford, Long rejoined his hometown club Cork City in November 2026 following their promotion back to the Premier Division.

== Club career ==
=== Cork City ===
Long came through the Cork City youth structure, before signing on professional terms in January 2008. He played for the Cork City teams that won the FAI Youth Cup, the Munster Youth Cup and FAI Futsal Cup in 2009. Shortly after, the centre half made his senior City debut away to St Patrick's Athletic, coming on as a second-half substitute.

=== Burnley ===
With his Cork City contract due to expire in November 2009, Long was linked with English clubs including Charlton Athletic, Millwall, Preston North End, Leeds United and Wolverhampton Wanderers. On 26 November, Premier League club Burnley confirmed that they had paid a six-figure fee and "beaten off stiff competition from top clubs north and south of the border" – reported as Celtic and Everton – to engage Long on a three-and-a-half-year contract, to begin when the January 2010 transfer window opened.

==== Loan to Accrington Stanley ====
On 15 October 2010, Long joined League Two club Accrington Stanley on a month's loan. He made his debut for the club in the 3–2 defeat to Rotherham United, but was sent off after 17 minutes for a foul on Adam Le Fondre. The loan was twice extended before he returned to Burnley on 18 January 2011 after cracking a bone in his foot during a match against Cheltenham Town. He rejoined Stanley at the end of January on loan for the remainder of the season. He made 17 appearances.

Long again signed for Stanley on 5 August 2011, this time on loan until the following January. As he did during his first spell on loan, Long maintained his first-team status. He scored the first goal of his English career in a 2–2 draw with Plymouth Argyle on 8 October, and went on to score against Bristol Rovers, Torquay United and Macclesfield Town. He re-joined Burnley on 5 January 2012, having made 26 appearances.

==== Loan to Rochdale ====
Long's former manager at Accrington, John Coleman, signed him for League One club Rochdale on 27 January 2012 on loan for a month. After playing four matches with two clean sheets during a run of two wins and a draw, Long extended his loan spell at Rochdale until the end of April. He continued in the first team, but Rochdale were unable to avoid relegation.

==== Loan to Portsmouth ====
On 18 August 2012, Long joined EFL League One side Portsmouth on a one-month emergency loan. He made his first appearance the same day, as a member of a team of debutants starting a 1–1 draw against AFC Bournemouth, was sent off for a second bookable offence in his third, and suffered a back injury in his fifth and last that meant his loan was not renewed.

=== Return to Burnley ===
Long scored his first goal for Burnley in a 4–3 FA Cup defeat at Southampton on 4 January 2014. He made his Premier League debut a year later, in a 3–3 draw away to Newcastle United on 1 January 2015. He replaced the injured Jason Shackell in the 17th minute, but 20 minutes later was himself replaced, becoming the third Burnley player to be substituted during the match. He had ruptured his cruciate knee ligaments. A few days later, he signed an extended contract with Burnley to run until 2017.

==== Loan to Barnsley ====
In November 2015, after regaining full fitness, Long joined League One club Barnsley on a month's loan. He scored a late winner against Oldham Athletic on his debut, but was sent off in his second game, against Peterborough United. He went on to help Barnsley reach the Football League Trophy final, successfully converting his kick in the penalty shootout that decided the northern area final. It was his last touch of a ball for Barnsley before his loan expired.

==== Loan to Milton Keynes Dons ====
On 24 March 2016, Long joined Championship club Milton Keynes Dons on loan for the remainder of the 2015–16 season.

=== Birmingham City ===
In January 2023, Long signed for Championship club Birmingham City until the end of the season. Lack of match fitness marred his early appearances – he had not played first-team football for eight months prior to joining – but head coach John Eustace continued to select him, and he started 20 of a possible 23 matches. Long was one of six senior professionals included on Birmingham's list of players to be released, but signed a new one-year contract with the club on 25 June. He played every minute of Birmingham's Championship season under Eustace's management, demonstrating aerial strength to complement centre-back partner Dion Sanderson's speed and ball skills, but lost his place to Emanuel Aiwu when Wayne Rooney took over as manager in October. A calf injury kept him out until January 2024, when Tony Mowbray restored him to the team, and he started four Championship matches before leaving the club for an undisclosed fee on 20 February.

=== Toronto FC ===
Long signed for Major League Soccer club Toronto FC on 20 February 2024. His contract covered 2024 with an option for 2025. He made his MLS debut five days later, playing the whole of the goalless opening-day visit to FC Cincinnati. He scored his first goal for the club against Simcoe County Rovers in a 5–0 victory at the Canadian Championship on April 24, 2024. Following the 2025 season, Toronto opted to decline their contract option on Long.

=== Waterford ===
On 15 March 2026, Long signed for League of Ireland Premier Division club Waterford. On 8 November 2026, he started in the 2026 FAI Cup final as his side were defeated 1–0 by Derry City at the Aviva Stadium.

=== Return to Cork City ===
On 11 November 2026, it was announced that Long had returned to his first senior club, Cork City ahead of the 2027 season, their first year back in the League of Ireland Premier Division following promotion.

== International career ==
In May 2017, he received his first call-up to the Republic of Ireland senior side in a 37-man squad for a training camp in Fota Island. He made the cut for the final squad for the friendlies against Mexico in New Jersey and Uruguay in Dublin, and made his debut on 1 June in the 3–1 defeat to Mexico at the MetLife Stadium, replacing John Egan as a second-half substitute.

== Career statistics ==
=== Club ===
As of match played 8 November 2026

Appearances and goals by club, season and competition
Club	Season	League			National cup (Note: Includes FAI Cup, FA Cup & Canadian Championship)		League cup (Note: Includes League of Ireland Cup, EFL Cup & Leagues Cup)		Other		Total	
Club	Season	Division	Apps	Goals	Apps	Goals	Apps	Goals	Apps	Goals	Apps	Goals
Cork City	2008	LOI Premier Division	0	0	0	0	0	0	0	0	0	0
Cork City	2009	LOI Premier Division	16	1	0	0	1	0	0	0	17	1
Cork City	Total		16	1	0	0	1	0	0	0	17	1
Burnley	2009–10	Premier League	0	0	—		—		—		0	0
Burnley	2010–11	Championship	0	0	—		0	0	—		0	0
Burnley	2011–12	Championship	0	0	0	0	—		—		0	0
Burnley	2012–13	Championship	14	0	0	0	0	0	—		14	0
Burnley	2013–14	Championship	7	0	1	1	3	0	—		11	1
Burnley	2014–15	Premier League	1	0	0	0	1	0	—		2	0
Burnley	2015–16	Championship	0	0	0	0	0	0	—		0	0
Burnley	2016–17	Premier League	3	0	0	0	1	0	—		4	0
Burnley	2017–18	Premier League	16	1	1	0	2	0	—		19	1
Burnley	2018–19	Premier League	6	0	2	0	1	1	3 (Note: Appearances in UEFA Europa League)	0	12	1
Burnley	2019–20	Premier League	8	0	2	0	1	0	—		11	0
Burnley	2020–21	Premier League	8	0	2	1	2	0	—		12	1
Burnley	2021–22	Premier League	6	0	0	0	0	0	—		6	0
Burnley	2022–23	Championship	0	0	—		0	0	—		0	0
Burnley	Total		69	1	8	2	11	1	3	0	91	4
Accrington Stanley (loan)	2010–11	League Two	15	0	2	0	—		—		17	0
Accrington Stanley (loan)	2011–12	League Two	24	4	0	0	1	0	1 (Note: Appearance(s) in Football League Trophy)	0	26	4
Rochdale (loan)	2011–12	League One	16	0	—		—		—		16	0
Portsmouth (loan)	2012–13	League One	5	0	—		—		1	0	6	0
Barnsley (loan)	2015–16	League One	11	2	—		—		2	0	13	2
Milton Keynes Dons (loan)	2015–16	Championship	2	0	—		—		—		2	0
Birmingham City	2022–23	Championship	17	1	3	1	0	0	—		20	2
Birmingham City	2023–24	Championship	17	0	1	0	2	0	—		20	0
Birmingham City	Total		34	1	4	1	2	0	—		40	2
Toronto FC	2024	MLS	26	0	5	1	3	0	—		34	1
Toronto FC	2025	MLS	24	0	1	0	—		—		25	0
Toronto FC	Total		50	0	6	1	3	0	—		59	1
Waterford	2026	LOI Premier Division	26	2	4	0	—		—		30	2
Career total			268	11	24	4	18	1	7	0	317	16

=== International ===
Appearances and goals by national team and year
National team	Year	Apps	Goals
Republic of Ireland	2017	4	0
Republic of Ireland	2018	7	0
Republic of Ireland	2019	2	1
Republic of Ireland	2020	4	0
Total		17	1

Republic of Ireland score listed first, score column indicates score after each Long goal.

International goals by date, venue, cap, opponent, score, result and competition
No.	Date	Venue	Opponent	Score	Result	Competition	Ref.
1	10 September 2019	Aviva Stadium, Dublin, Ireland	Bulgaria	2–1	3–1	Friendly	
