= Luke O'Neill (footballer) =

English association football player

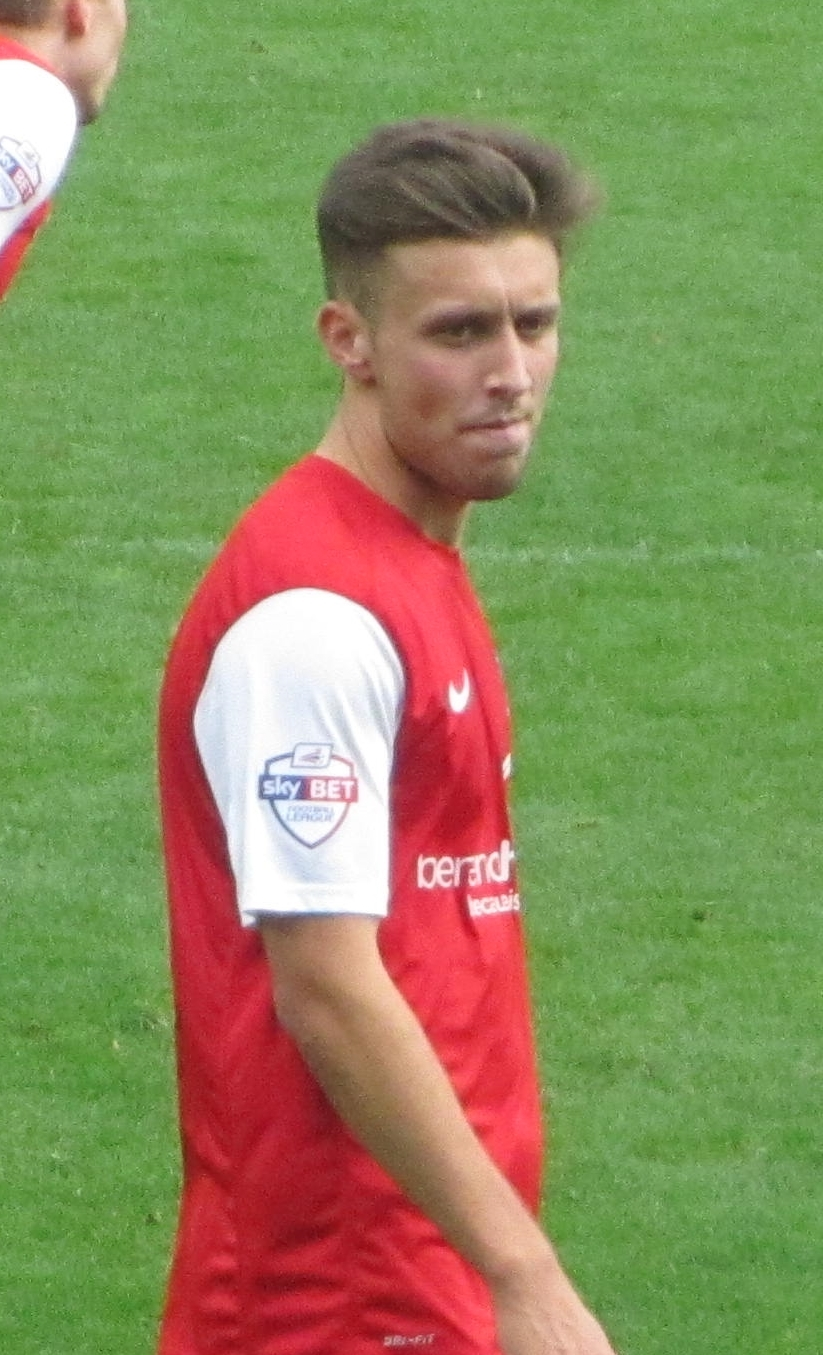
- O'Neill playing for York City in 2013

Personal information
- Full name: Luke Marcus O'Neill
- Date of birth: 20 August 1991 (age 35)
- Place of birth: Slough, England
- Height: 6 ft 0 in (1.83 m)
- Position: Right back

Team information
- Current team: AFC Croydon Athletic

Youth career
- –2008: Leicester City

Senior career*
Years	Team	Apps	(Gls)
2008–2011	Leicester City	1	(0)
2010	→ Tranmere Rovers (loan)	4	(0)
2011	→ Kettering Town (loan)	19	(2)
2011–2012	Mansfield Town	43	(3)
2012–2015	Burnley	1	(0)
2013–2014	→ York City (loan)	15	(1)
2014	→ Southend United (loan)	1	(0)
2014	→ Scunthorpe United (loan)	13	(0)
2015	→ Leyton Orient (loan)	8	(0)
2015	→ Southend United (loan)	0	(0)
2015–2017	Southend United	31	(1)
2017–2019	Gillingham	76	(4)
2019–2021	AFC Wimbledon	58	(1)
2021–2022	Kettering Town	6	(0)
2022	Stevenage	12	(0)
2022–2025	Ebbsfleet United	97	(11)
2025	Welling United	11	(0)
2026	Canvey Island	15	(0)
2026–	AFC Croydon Athletic	0	(0)

International career
2007–2008	England U17	9	(0)
- * Club domestic league appearances and goals as of 16:29, 7 August 2026 (UTC)

Luke Marcus O'Neill (born 20 August 1991) is an English professional footballer who plays as a right back for Isthmian League South East Division club AFC Croydon Athletic. He graduated from the Leicester City youth academy. He has represented England at under-17 level.

== Career ==
=== Leicester City ===
Born in Slough, Berkshire, O'Neill came through the youth academy at Leicester City and was part of the side that won the Premier Academy League in the 2006–07 season. He was named as a substitute for the first time in a League Cup win over Stockport County on 12 August 2008, however he was unused on that occasion.

On 29 August 2008, just a few days after his 17th birthday, O'Neill signed a three-year professional contract, tying him to Leicester until the summer of 2011. He then made his first-team debut for Leicester on 2 September 2008 against Hartlepool United in a 3–0 Football League Trophy win.

O'Neill's next first-team involvement for Leicester came almost a year later when he was named as an unused substitute in their opening day fixture against Swansea City. He made his first appearance of 2009–10 three days later, playing the full 90 minutes as Leicester beat Macclesfield Town 2–0 in the League Cup. On 26 December 2009, O'Neill made his league debut for Leicester, coming on as a half-time substitute against Sheffield United, replacing the injured Jack Hobbs.

==== Tranmere Rovers ====
On 18 February 2010, O'Neill joined League One club Tranmere Rovers on a one-month loan.

==== Kettering Town ====
On 31 January 2011, he joined Conference Premier club Kettering Town on a one-month loan.

=== Mansfield Town ===
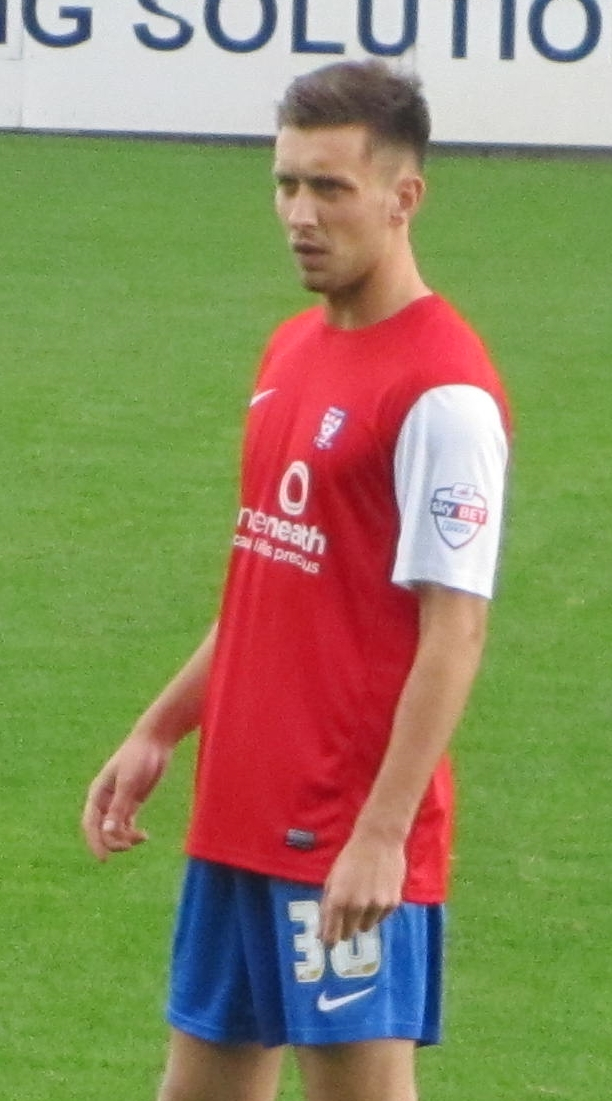
O'Neill playing for York City in 2013

On 30 June 2011, O'Neill signed for Conference Premier club Mansfield Town on a one-year contract. He made his debut on 13 August 2011 in a 1–1 draw with Bath City, he then later scored his first goal for the club in a 5–0 win over Newport County. O'Neill helped Mansfield to a play-off semi-final where they lost 2–1 on aggregate to York City. His performances throughout 2011–12 attracted Championship clubs Burnley, Cardiff City and Ipswich Town. Burnley had a bid rejected by the Conference club, but manager Paul Cox admitted O'Neill could leave if the offer is right.

=== Burnley ===
On 15 June 2012, O'Neill signed for Championship club Burnley for an undisclosed fee.

==== York City ====
He joined League Two club York City on 4 October 2013 on a 28-day emergency loan. His debut came the following day in a 3–0 away defeat to Torquay United, before scoring his first goal for York in a 2–2 draw away to Chesterfield with a 30-yard shot into the bottom right corner. On 31 October 2013, O'Neill's loan was extended until 4 January 2014, after making six appearances and scoring one goal for York. He was recalled by Burnley a day early on 3 January 2014 to be part of the squad for their FA Cup match against Southampton. He had made 16 appearances and scored one goal for York.

==== Southend United ====
On 17 January 2014, O'Neill joined League Two club Southend United on a 30-day emergency loan.

==== Scunthorpe United ====
He joined Scunthorpe United on 18 August 2014 on a three-month loan, making his debut a day later in a 2–0 home defeat to Fleetwood Town.

==== Leyton Orient ====
On 26 February 2015, he joined Leyton Orient on loan until the end of 2014–15.

=== Southend United ===
O'Neill rejoined Southend United, by this time in League One, on 22 August 2015 on a one-month loan. He had his Burnley contract terminated by mutual consent on 1 September 2015, ahead of a permanent transfer to Southend on a two-year contract. He scored his first goal for Southend in a 3-1 win against Millwall on 17 September 2016.

=== Gillingham ===
O'Neill signed for League One club Gillingham on 6 June 2017 on a two-year contract. He was released by Gillingham at the end of the 2018–19 season.

=== AFC Wimbledon ===
O'Neill signed for League One club AFC Wimbledon on 4 July 2019 on a contract of undisclosed length. He scored his first goal for Wimbledon in an EFL Cup tie against rivals Milton Keynes Dons on 13 August 2019. O'Neill was released by the club at the end of the 2020–21 season.

=== Return to Kettering Town ===
In November 2021, he dropped back into non-League football when he signed for National League North club Kettering Town on a free transfer, having previously spent time on loan there in 2011.

=== Stevenage ===
O'Neill signed for League Two club Stevenage on 3 January 2022. He was released at the end of the season.

=== Ebbsfleet United ===
On 30 June 2022, O'Neill signed for National League South side Ebbsfleet United, where he would go on to win the 2022–23 league title. He departed the club at the end of the 2024–25 season.

=== Welling United ===
In June 2025, O'Neill joined Isthmian League Premier Division club Welling United. In October 2025, he was named interim assistant manager to Rod Stringer following the sacking of Lee Martin. He departed the club in December 2025.

=== Canvey Island ===
In January 2026, O'Neill joined Isthmian Premier Division club Canvey Island.

=== AFC Croydon Athletic ===
In August 2026, O'Neill joined Isthmian South East Division club AFC Croydon Athletic.

== Career statistics ==
As of end of 2025–26 season

Appearances and goals by club, season and competition
Club	Season	League			FA Cup		League Cup		Other		Total	
Club	Season	Division	Apps	Goals	Apps	Goals	Apps	Goals	Apps	Goals	Apps	Goals
Leicester City	2008–09	League One	0	0	0	0	0	0	1 (Note: Appearance(s) in the Football League Trophy)	0	1	0
Leicester City	2009–10	Championship	1	0	0	0	1	0	—		2	0
Leicester City	2010–11	Championship	0	0	0	0	0	0	—		0	0
Leicester City	Total		1	0	0	0	1	0	1	0	3	0
Tranmere Rovers (loan)	2009–10	League One	4	0	0	0	0	0	0	0	4	0
Kettering Town (loan)	2010–11	Conference Premier	19	2	0	0	—		0	0	19	2
Mansfield Town	2011–12	Conference Premier	43	3	2	0	—		3 (Note: One appearance in FA Trophy, two in Conference Premier play-offs)	0	48	3
Burnley	2012–13	Championship	1	0	0	0	1	0	—		2	0
Burnley	2013–14	Championship	0	0	0	0	0	0	—		0	0
Burnley	2014–15	Premier League	0	0	0	0	0	0	—		0	0
Burnley	Total		1	0	0	0	1	0	0	0	2	0
York City (loan)	2013–14	League Two	15	1	0	0	0	0	1	0	16	1
Southend United (loan)	2013–14	League Two	1	0	0	0	0	0	0	0	1	0
Scunthorpe United (loan)	2014–15	League One	13	0	0	0	0	0	2	0	15	0
Leyton Orient (loan)	2014–15	League One	8	0	0	0	0	0	0	0	8	0
Southend United	2015–16	League One	14	0	1	0	0	0	0	0	15	0
Southend United	2016–17	League One	17	1	0	0	1	0	3	0	21	1
Southend United	Total		31	1	1	0	1	0	3	0	36	1
Gillingham	2017–18	League One	38	1	3	1	1	0	2	1	44	3
Gillingham	2018–19	League One	38	3	5	1	1	0	2	0	46	4
Gillingham	Total		76	4	8	2	2	0	4	1	90	7
AFC Wimbledon	2019–20	League One	31	1	2	0	1	1	0	0	34	2
AFC Wimbledon	2020–21	League One	28	0	0	0	1	0	1	0	30	0
AFC Wimbledon	Total		59	1	2	0	2	1	1	0	64	2
Stevenage	2021–22	League Two	12	0	0	0	0	0	0	0	12	0
Ebbsfleet United	2022–23	National League South	42	5	3	0	—		0	0	45	5
Ebbsfleet United	2023–24	National League	33	6	0	0	—		1 (Note: Appearance(s) in FA Trophy)	0	34	6
Ebbsfleet United	2024–25	National League	22	0	0	0	—		0	0	22	0
Ebbsfleet United	Total		97	11	3	0	0	0	1	0	101	11
Welling United	2025–26	Isthmian League Premier Division	11	0	0	0	—		1 (Note: Appearance(s) in Alan Turvey Trophy)	0	12	0
Canvey Island	2025–26	Isthmian League Premier Division	15	0	—		—		0	0	15	0
Career total			406	23	16	2	7	1	17	1	446	27
