= Dean Marney (footballer) =

English footballer

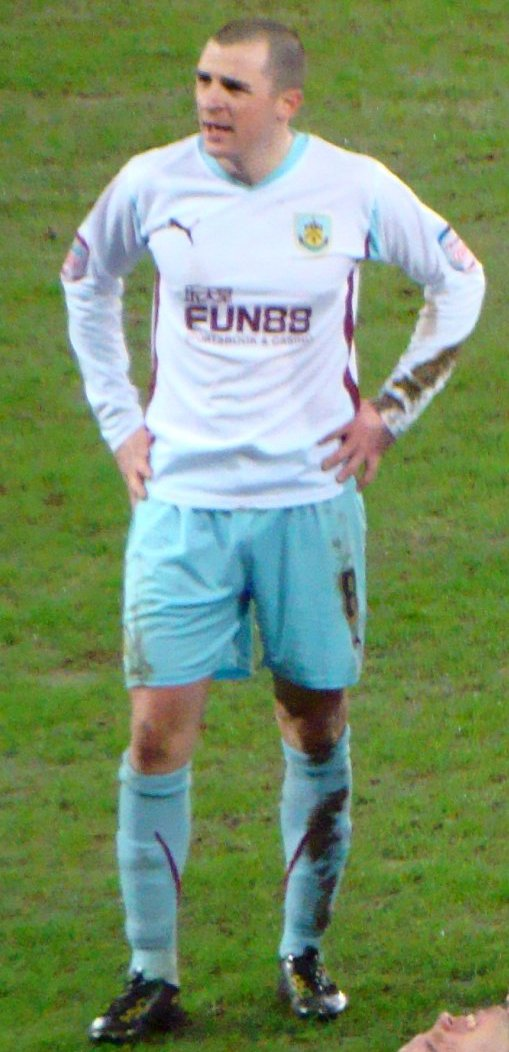
- Marney playing for Burnley in 2011

Personal information
- Full name: Dean Edward Marney
- Date of birth: 31 January 1984 (age 42)
- Place of birth: Barking, England
- Height: 5 ft 10 in (1.78 m)
- Position: Midfielder

Team information
- Current team: Stoke City (U18 lead coach)

Youth career
- 1993–2002: Tottenham Hotspur

Senior career*
Years	Team	Apps	(Gls)
2002–2006	Tottenham Hotspur	8	(2)
2002–2003	→ Swindon Town (loan)	9	(0)
2004	→ Queens Park Rangers (loan)	2	(0)
2004	→ Gillingham (loan)	3	(0)
2005	→ Norwich City (loan)	13	(0)
2006–2010	Hull City	125	(9)
2010–2018	Burnley	202	(9)
2018–2020	Fleetwood Town	16	(1)
Total		378	(21)

International career
2005	England U21	1	(0)
- * Club domestic league appearances and goals

Dean Edward Marney (born 31 January 1984) is an English former professional footballer who played as a midfielder. He is the U18 Lead coach at Stoke City.

== Club career ==
=== Tottenham Hotspur ===
Born in Barking, London, Marney is a product of the Tottenham Hotspur youth system. Although predominantly a midfielder he showed an aptitude at right-back and understudied to then Spurs right back Stephen Carr, and was viewed by many as the Irish international's natural successor. He really emerged onto the scene in a mid season friendly against Irish champions Bohemians putting in a man of the match performance from right back. Unable to get his start as a young player in the Tottenham team, he was loaned out early on in his career to Swindon Town.

His initial first team action for Spurs came in August 2003, against Birmingham City. By January 2004 he had joined Queens Park Rangers on loan, as by that time Spurs had strengthened their strike force. Upon his return he was handed his debut start, but that would be his only appearance until November 2004, when he joined Gillingham on loan.

When he returned to Tottenham, he was immediately thrown in at the deep end, as a last minute choice to face an Everton team on 1 January 2005, in which he scored the first and last goals of the match in a 5–2 victory, the second being a superb 25-yard curler into the top right corner.

He struggled with form until February 2005, the month in which he participated in his only international, an England under-21 match versus the Netherlands. After considerable squad strengthening in the early part of the 2005–06 season, which included the signings of Edgar Davids and Jermaine Jenas, he found himself out of action, and moved for a season-long loan to Norwich City in the hope of winning them promotion back to the Premier League. However his time at Norwich City was cut short due to injury and he returned to Tottenham on 31 October 2005.

=== Hull City ===
Phil Parkinson made Marney his second signing for Hull City on 14 July 2006 for an undisclosed fee.

=== Burnley ===
Burnley manager Brian Laws made Marney his first summer signing on 28 May 2010. Marney scored his first goal for Burnley in a 3–3 draw with Sheffield United on 16 October 2010.

Marney struggled to establish himself in the Burnley team in his first season at the club, having spells in and out of the side. For the opening few games of his second season, Marney found himself out of favour and used predominantly as a substitute. However, a string of impressive performances from the midfielder saw him given an extended run in the side and Marney finished the season as one of the Claret's most impressive performers. The 2012–13 season is considered by many to be the best of Marney's career, being an almost ever-present in the Clarets side missing matches only through suspension and injury. Marney helped Burnley stave off relegation and eventually finish 11th in the Championship .

Marney began the 2013–14 season in a similar vein, performing very well during pre-season and the opening matches of the Football League Championship, where he formed an effective partnership with former Wolves and Wigan Athletic midfielder, David Jones, who signed for the Clarets in the summer. Over his first three seasons with Burnley, he appeared in approximately 75% of their league games and, with his contract about to expire in 2013, signed a new two-year deal. At the end of the 2017–18 season, he was released by Burnley after eight years at the club and having made over 220 appearances.

=== Fleetwood Town ===
In July 2018, Marney joined Fleetwood Town, taking the squad number 25. In July 2020, Marney was released by Fleetwood Town at the end of his contract.

== Coaching career ==
In May 2024, he was appointed as the lead U-18 coach at League Two side Salford City after previously coaching the U-15 and U-16 sides at former club Burnley. Marney was appointed U18 lead coach at Stoke City in June 2025.

== International career ==
Marney represented England at international gaining one cap for the England under-21 side in England's 2–1 defeat to Netherlands U-21 in February 2005.

== Style of play ==
Marney is a free-flowing midfielder and has proven to be a key factor in distribution throughout the teams he has played for. While at Burnley, he developed a reputation as something of a 'hard man', picking up 12 yellow cards and 1 red card in the 2012–13 season, a figure higher than all of his team-mates and the second highest in the Championship. He is confident in challenging for the ball but shows good control of his aggression.

== Career statistics ==
Appearances and goals by club, season and competition
Club	Season	League			FA Cup		League Cup		Other		Total	
Club	Season	Division	Apps	Goals	Apps	Goals	Apps	Goals	Apps	Goals	Apps	Goals
Tottenham Hotspur	2002–03	Premier League	0	0	0	0	0	0	—		0	0
Tottenham Hotspur	2003–04	Premier League	3	0	0	0	0	0	—		3	0
Tottenham Hotspur	2004–05	Premier League	5	2	3	0	0	0	—		8	2
Tottenham Hotspur	2005–06	Premier League	0	0	0	0	—		—		0	0
Tottenham Hotspur	Total		8	2	3	0	0	0	—		11	2
Swindon Town (loan)	2002–03	Second Division	9	0	—		—		—		9	0
Queens Park Rangers (loan)	2003–04	Second Division	2	0	—		—		1 (Note: Appearance in EFL Trophy)	0	3	0
Gillingham (loan)	2004–05	Championship	3	0	—		—		—		3	0
Norwich City (loan)	2005–06	Championship	13	0	—		2	0	—		15	0
Hull City	2006–07	Championship	37	2	1	0	3	0	—		41	2
Hull City	2007–08	Championship	41	6	1	0	2	0	1 (Note: Appearance in Football League Championship play-offs)	0	45	6
Hull City	2008–09	Premier League	31	0	4	0	0	0	—		35	0
Hull City	2009–10	Premier League	16	1	0	0	1	0	—		17	1
Hull City	Total		125	9	6	0	6	0	1	0	138	9
Burnley	2010–11	Championship	36	3	3	0	2	0	—		41	3
Burnley	2011–12	Championship	37	0	1	0	4	0	—		42	0
Burnley	2012–13	Championship	38	2	1	0	2	1	—		41	3
Burnley	2013–14	Championship	38	3	1	0	3	0	—		42	3
Burnley	2014–15	Premier League	20	0	2	0	0	0	—		22	0
Burnley	2015–16	Championship	12	0	0	0	0	0	—		12	0
Burnley	2016–17	Premier League	21	1	0	0	0	0	—		21	1
Burnley	2017–18	Premier League	0	0	0	0	0	0	—		0	0
Burnley	Total		202	9	8	0	11	1	—		221	10
Fleetwood Town	2018–19	League One	16	1	2	0	0	0	1	0	19	1
Career total			378	21	19	0	19	1	3	0	419	22

== Honours ==
Hull City

- Football League Championship play-offs: 2008

Burnley

- Football League Championship: 2015–16; second-placed promotion: 2013–14
