= Joe Jackson (footballer) =

English footballer

Personal information
- Full name: Joseph John Jackson
- Date of birth: 3 February 1993 (age 33)
- Place of birth: Barrow-in-Furness, England
- Height: 5 ft 11 in (1.80 m)
- Position: Striker

Youth career
- 2003–2011: Burnley

Senior career*
Years	Team	Apps	(Gls)
2011–2013	Burnley	1	(0)
2012	→ Barrow (loan)	6	(3)
2012–2013	→ Barrow (loan)	23	(3)
2013–2014	Workington	41	(13)
Total		71	(19)
- * Club domestic league appearances and goals

Joseph John 'Joe' Jackson (born 3 February 1993) is an English former professional footballer who played as a forward.

Jackson signed a professional one-year contract with Burnley in May 2011, having joined the club's Centre of Excellence in 2003. He made his first team debut with the club in April 2012. In January 2012, Jackson joined Barrow on loan, returning to his parent club in April. In August 2013 he joined Workington on a free transfer. After being diagnosed with leukemia in 2014 Jackson was given the all-clear in January 2018.

== Career ==
=== Burnley ===
Jackson joined the Burnley Centre of Excellence in 2003 from local side Furness Rovers, progressing through the youth system, signing two-year scholarship forms in the summer of 2009. He featured regularly for the reserve and youth sides, becoming the top scorer in the 2010–11 season, bagging 15 goals in 24 games.

Jackson's goalscoring form led to him being offered professional terms in the summer of 2011, on a one-year deal. He sustained a foot injury shortly after signing his contract and missed the start of the 2011–12 season. Jackson returned to training in October, featuring with the first team in January 2012, when he was given a squad number and was an unused substitute in the FA Cup defeat at Norwich City. He made his professional debut for the Clarets on 21 April 2012, coming on as a substitute for Charlie Austin in a 4–0 defeat to Blackpool at Bloomfield Road, and signed a new one-year contract in July.

On 4 April 2013, it was announced that he would not be offered a new contract when it expired in the summer.

=== Barrow ===
On 10 January 2012, Jackson was loaned out to his home-town club Barrow on a one-month youth loan, which also allowed him to feature in the FA Trophy. He made his debut in a 4–1 defeat to Fleetwood Town, scoring from close range after coming on as a substitute for Andy Cook. He made his first start two weeks later in a 3–2 win over Tamworth. His second goal for Barrow was a dramatic last-gasp equaliser in a 2–2 draw with Grimsby Town. Jackson was given a three-match ban for violent conduct in a 1–0 defeat to Braintree Town, after pushing Dean Wells in the chest. At the end of January, Jackson had his loan at the club extended until the end of the season. He scored the opening goal in a 2–2 draw with Southport, which proved to be his final goal for the club. On 13 April, Jackson was recalled by his parent club. On 7 August 2012, Jackson returned to Barrow on loan until January 2013 along with central defender Tom Anderson.

=== Workington ===
On 16 August 2013, Jackson signed a one-year deal with Conference North side Workington on a free transfer.

== Personal life ==
In 2014 Jackson was diagnosed with leukemia. After a long recovery he was given the all-clear in January 2018. Supported financially by the Professional Footballers' Association, he received a place to study a masters in finance at Cass Business School, University of London.

== Career statistics ==
Appearances and goals by club, season and competition
Club	Season	League			FA Cup		League Cup		Other		Total	
Club	Season	Division	Apps	Goals	Apps	Goals	Apps	Goals	Apps	Goals	Apps	Goals
Burnley	2011–12	Championship	1	0	0	0	0	0	—		1	0
Burnley	2012–13	Championship	0	0	0	0	0	0	—		0	0
Burnley	Total		1	0	0	0	0	0	—		1	0
Barrow (loan)	2011–12	Conference Premier	6	3	0	0	—		1 (Note: Appearances in FA Trophy)	0	7	3
Barrow (loan)	2012–13	Conference Premier	23	3	1	0	—		2	0	26	3
Barrow (loan)	Total		29	6	1	0	—		3	0	33	6
Workington	2013–14	Conference North	41	13	3	0	—		1	0	45	13
Career total			71	19	4	0	0	0	4	0	79	19
