= Jon Stewart (footballer) =

English footballer (born 1989)

Personal information
- Full name: Jonathan Harris Stewart
- Date of birth: 13 March 1989 (age 37)
- Place of birth: Hayes, Greater London, England
- Height: 1.88 m (6 ft 2 in)
- Position: Goalkeeper

Youth career
- 2005–2007: Swindon Town

Senior career*
Years	Team	Apps	(Gls)
2007–2008	Weymouth	8	(0)
2008–2009	Portsmouth	0	(0)
2009	Alzira		
2010–2011	Bournemouth	6	(0)
2011–2013	Burnley	0	(0)
2012	→ Alfreton Town (loan)	11	(0)
2012–2013	→ Alfreton Town (loan)	16	(0)
2013–2014	Worksop Town	54	(0)
2014–2015	Alfreton Town	3	(0)
2015–2016	Bradford Park Avenue	32	(0)
2016–2017	Shaw Lane	52	
2018	Boston United	10	(0)
2018–2019	Gainsborough Trinity	28	(0)
2019–2021	Matlock Town	20	(0)
2021–2022	Liversedge		
- * Club domestic league appearances and goals as of 22:25, 28 January 2022 (UTC)

Jonathan Harris Stewart (born 13 March 1989) is an English footballer who plays as a goalkeeper.

Stewart has played professionally for Bournemouth and Spanish side Alzira where as spells with Portsmouth and Burnley yielded no first team appearances. He has played at Non-league level for Weymouth, Alfreton Town, Worksop Town, Bradford Park Avenue, Shaw Lane, Boston United, Gainsborough Trinity, Matlock Town, Liversedge F.C and Humber United.

== Career ==
Stewart started his career with the Swindon Town he was a un-used substitute for the final game of the season, in his second year scholarship he was named as substitute in all fixtures under the management of Dennis Wise and later on Paul Storrock in league 2,

upon the expiry of his contract moving to Weymouth in 2007 under then manager Jason Tindall, His Weymouth debut came on 18 September 2007 against Rushden & Diamonds in a 2–1 defeat; he was 18 at the time. His first clean sheet was against Northwich Victoria two weeks later. He spent one year at Weymouth

Before leaving in 2008 to join then Premier league club Portsmouth under manager Harry Redknapp with whom he spent two seasons with, Stewart rejected the offer of a contract extension after his first season at the club deciding to sign for Spanish second tier team Alzira playing 10 games before returning to Portsmouth in November 2009, In 2010 Stewart signed for Bournemouth managed by Eddie Howe on a two-year deal as their second choice goalkeeper. Stewart's Bournemouth and Football League debut came on 20 November 2010 when he came on as a 78th-minute substitute for first choice goalkeeper Shwan Jalal in a 2–2 away draw with Leyton Orient.

On 11 February 2011 while at Bournemouth f.c, it was announced that Stewart will spend time training at Premier League club West Ham f.c under then goalkeeper coach David Coles with a view to a permanent transfer.

In early July 2011, it was confirmed that Stewart's former manager Eddie Howe had taken him on trial at Burnley, and confirmed that he would most likely become third choice keeper at the Lancashire club.

On 2 August, it was announced that Stewart will sign a one-year contract with the Clarets and would most likely play in the reserve squad. On 2 March 2012, he joined Conference National side Alfreton Town on loan until the end of the season.

On 28 April 2012, Stewart returned to Burnley and was an un-used substitute in their 1–1 draw with Bristol City.

On 31 August 2012, Stewart re-signed for Football Conference side Alfreton Town on loan until January 2013. Having made 18 appearances he returned to Burnley on 1 January after his loan at Alfreton finished.

In May 2013, Stewart was released after two years at Burnley following the expiry of his contract. In October 2013, Stewart signed for Northern Premier League side Worksop Town on a free transfer. In June 2014, he re-joined Alfreton Town on a one-year contract.

In October 2014, Jon re-registered himself with Worksop Town and kept a clean sheet in the first appearance of his new spell in a 3–0 FA Vase victory away at Long Eaton United.

On 1 June 2015, Jon joined Bradford Park Avenue A.F.C. as a free signing.

Stewart signed for Northern Premier League side Gainsborough Trinity in May 2018. In July 2020, Stewart signed for Matlock Town. In 2021 he joined Northern Premier League Division One East side Yorkshire Amateur for pre-season, but left before the opening game as the move did not work out. A couple of months later he signed for divisional rivals Liversedge.

== Coaching career ==
Jon Stewart is currently first team goalkeeper coach at National league side Morecambe since September 2025.

Stewart has acquired both UEFA B outfield and Goalkeeping licenses.

== Career statistics ==
As of match played 29 April 2014.

Appearances and goals by club, season and competition
Club	Season	League			FA Cup		League Cup		Other		Total	
Club	Season	Division	Apps	Goals	Apps	Goals	Apps	Goals	Apps	Goals	Apps	Goals
Weymouth	2007–08	Conference Premier	8	0	3	0	—		0	0	11	0
Portsmouth	2008–09	Premier League	0	0	0	0	0	0	0	0	0	0
Portsmouth	2009–10	Premier League	0	0	0	0	0	0	—		0	0
Portsmouth	Total		0	0	0	0	0	0	0	0	0	0
Bournemouth	2010–11	League One	5	0	1	0	0	0	0	0	5	0
Burnley	2011–12	Championship	0	0	0	0	0	0	—		0	0
Burnley	2012–13	Championship	0	0	0	0	0	0	—		0	0
Burnley	Total		0	0	0	0	0	0	—		0	0
Alfreton Town (loan)	2011–12	Conference Premier	11	0	0	0	—		0	0	11	0
Alfreton Town (loan)	2012–13	Conference Premier	16	0	3	0	—		1 (Note: Appearance in FA Trophy)	0	20	0
Alfreton Town (loan)	Total		27	0	3	0	—		1	0	31	0
Worksop Town	2013–14	NPL Premier Division	54	0	0	0	—		0	0	24	0
Career total			94	0	7	0	0	0	1	0	71	0
