= Wes Fletcher =

English footballer

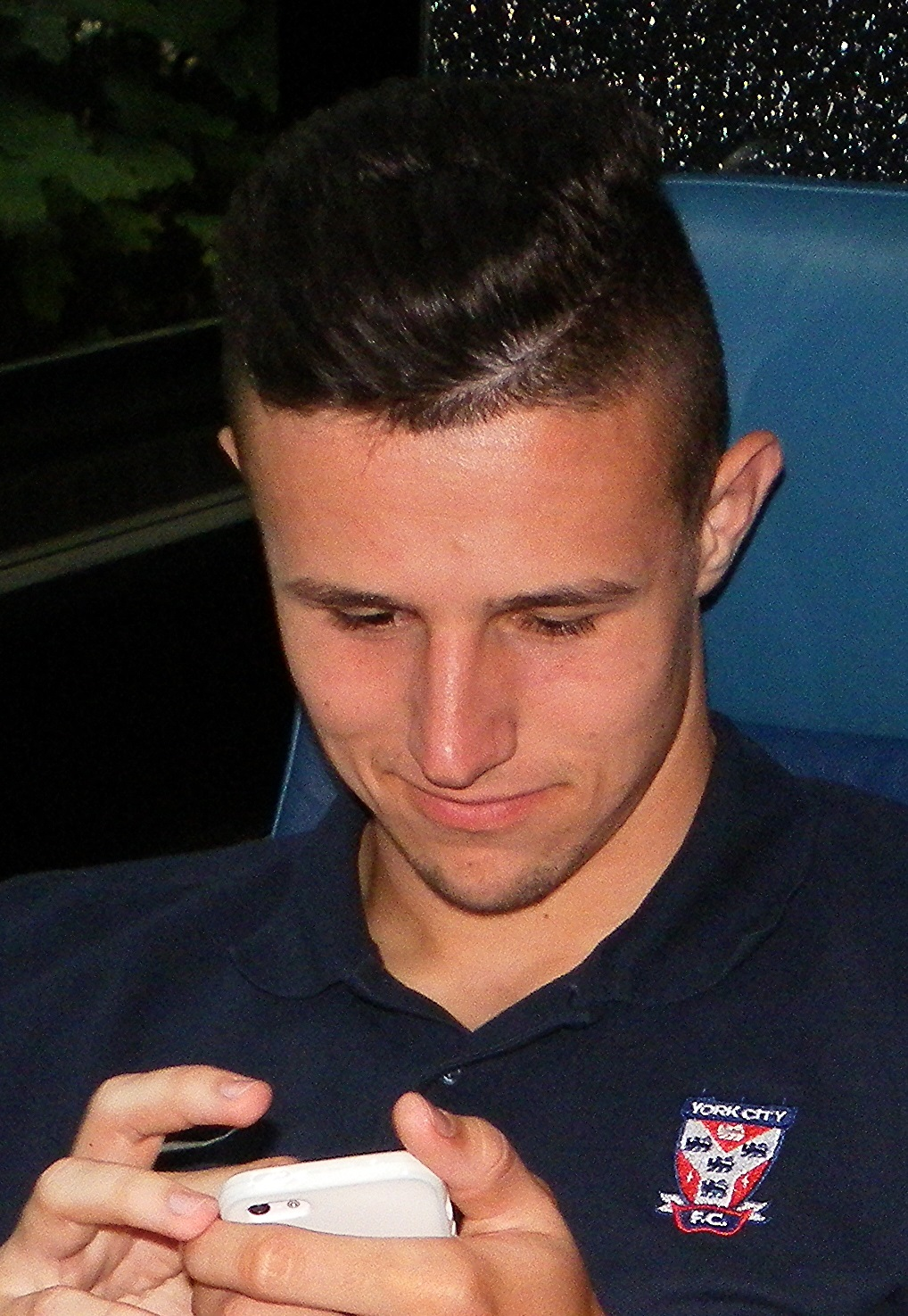
- Fletcher with York City in 2013

Personal information
- Full name: Wesleigh James Fletcher
- Date of birth: 28 February 1991 (age 35)
- Place of birth: Ormskirk, England
- Height: 5 ft 11 in (1.80 m)
- Position: Striker

Youth career
- Manchester United
- 2004–2007: Liverpool
- 2007–2009: Burnley

Senior career*
| Years | Team | Apps | (Gls) |
| 2009–2013 | Burnley | 0 | (0) |
| 2010 | → Grimsby Town (loan) | 6 | (1) |
| 2010–2011 | → Stockport County (loan) | 9 | (1) |
| 2011 | → Accrington Stanley (loan) | 10 | (2) |
| 2011–2012 | → Crewe Alexandra (loan) | 6 | (1) |
| 2013 | → Yeovil Town (loan) | 1 | (0) |
| 2013–2015 | York City | 61 | (16) |
| 2015–2016 | Motherwell | 14 | (1) |
| 2016–2018 | The New Saints | 29 | (7) |
| 2018–2019 | Chorley | 1 | (0) |
| 2018 | → Lancaster City (loan) | 5 | (0) |
| Total | | 142 | (29) |
- * Club domestic league appearances and goals as of 20:35, 1 February 2018 (UTC)

Wesleigh James Fletcher (born 28 February 1991) is an English former professional footballer who played as a striker.

Having come through the youth academies of Manchester United and Liverpool he was given his first professional contract by Burnley. He would make his professional debut for Grimsby Town and also played in the Football League for Stockport County, Accrington Stanley, Crewe Alexandra, Yeovil Town and York City. He also played in the Scottish Premiership for Motherwell and the Cymru Premier for The New Saints. He later played non-league football for Chorley and Lancaster City.

== Career ==
=== Early career ===
Born in Ormskirk, Lancashire, Fletcher played for the Manchester United youth team while he was at primary school. When he was 13 he joined Liverpool but failed to receive a Youth Team Scholarship (YTS). While representing Lancashire he was discovered by Burnley who did offer him a YTS.

=== Burnley ===
Fletcher was given his first professional contract by Burnley in March 2009 and became part of the first team for the 2009–10 season. In January 2010, Fletcher was sent out on loan to League Two club Grimsby Town and made his debut against Cheltenham Town on 16 January 2010, less than 24 hours after signing on loan. He scored his first goal after coming on as a substitute in a 2–1 defeat to Rotherham United on 23 January 2010. He returned to Burnley on 24 February 2010.

Fletcher made his debut for Burnley in the League Cup match against Morecambe on 24 August coming on as a substitute for Jay Rodriguez. On 15 October 2010, he moved to Stockport County on a one-month loan. He made his debut for the club on 16 October 2010, as part of a 2–1 victory over Barnet. The loan was extended into a second, then third month.

Fletcher had to wait almost another full year before his next appearance for Burnley, again in the League Cup coming on as a substitute for Jay Rodriguez in Burnley's 6–3 win over Burton Albion on 9 August 2011.

On 16 August 2011, Fletcher joined Accrington Stanley on loan until January 2012. On his Accrington debut he scored the winner in a 1–0 win at home to Bradford City. He returned to Burnley on 24 October 2011 after making 12 appearances. On 25 November 2011, he moved on loan to Crewe Alexandra on loan until 5 January.

On 28 February 2013, Fletcher joined League One club Yeovil Town on a one-month loan deal. Fletcher was released by Burnley on 21 May 2013.

=== York City ===
He signed for League Two club York City on a two-year contract on 13 June 2013. His debut came as a 70th-minute substitute in a 4–0 home defeat to his former club Burnley in the first round of the League Cup on 6 August 2013. Fletcher scored his first goals for York with two goals in a 4–2 home win over Portsmouth on 28 September 2013.

=== Motherwell ===
On 27 June 2015, Fletcher signed with Scottish Premiership club Motherwell on a one-year contract. On his debut, he scored after just four minutes, as Motherwell won 1–0 away to Inverness Caledonian Thistle on 1 August 2015. He was released by the club at the end of 2015–16 after his contract expired.

=== The New Saints ===
On 30 August 2016, Fletcher signed a two-year contract with Welsh Premier League club The New Saints. He scored 1 goal from 23 appearances in 2016–17 as The New Saints won the Welsh Premier League title. He left the club in May 2018.

=== Chorley ===
In June 2018 he joined Chorley. In August 2018 he joined Lancaster City on a month long loan.

== Career statistics ==
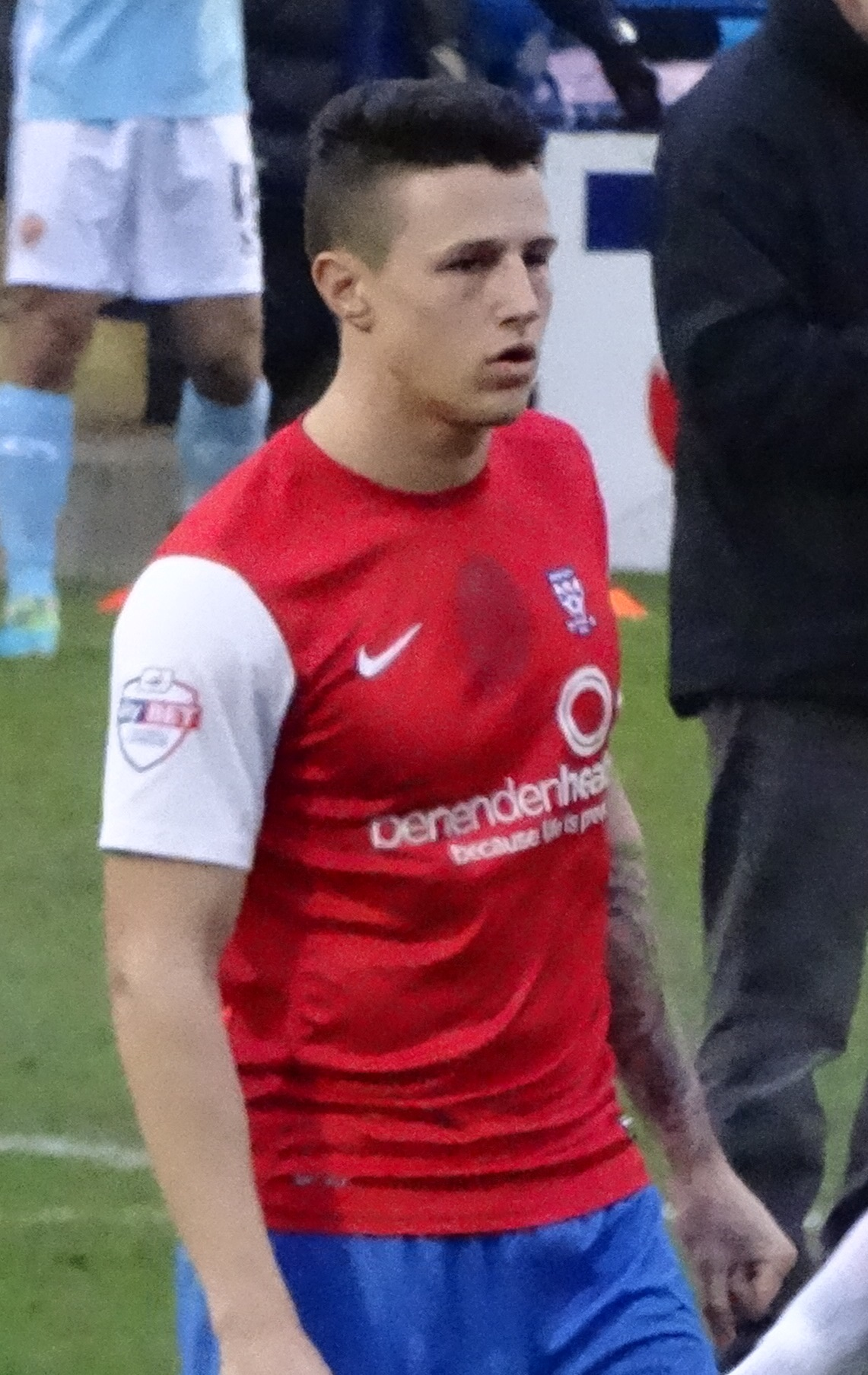
Fletcher playing for York City in 2014

As of match played 30 April 2017

Appearances and goals by club, season and competition
| Club | Season | League | | | National Cup | | League Cup | | Other | | Total | |
| Club | Season | Division | Apps | Goals | Apps | Goals | Apps | Goals | Apps | Goals | Apps | Goals |
|---|---|---|---|---|---|---|---|---|---|---|---|---|
| Burnley | 2009–10 | Premier League | 0 | 0 | 0 | 0 | 0 | 0 | — | | 0 | 0 |
| Burnley | 2010–11 | Championship | 0 | 0 | — | | 1 | 0 | — | | 1 | 0 |
| Burnley | 2011–12 | Championship | 0 | 0 | 0 | 0 | 1 | 0 | — | | 1 | 0 |
| Burnley | 2012–13 | Championship | 0 | 0 | 0 | 0 | 0 | 0 | — | | 0 | 0 |
| Burnley | Total | | 0 | 0 | 0 | 0 | 2 | 0 | — | | 2 | 0 |
| Grimsby Town (loan) | 2009–10 | League Two | 6 | 1 | — | | — | | — | | 6 | 1 |
| Stockport County (loan) | 2010–11 | League Two | 9 | 1 | 2 | 0 | — | | 1 (Note: Appearance(s) in Football League Trophy) | 0 | 12 | 1 |
| Accrington Stanley (loan) | 2011–12 | League Two | 10 | 2 | — | | — | | 2 | 0 | 12 | 2 |
| Crewe Alexandra (loan) | 2011–12 | League Two | 6 | 1 | — | | — | | — | | 6 | 1 |
| Yeovil Town (loan) | 2012–13 | League One | 1 | 0 | — | | — | | — | | 1 | 0 |
| York City | 2013–14 | League Two | 32 | 10 | 2 | 3 | 1 | 0 | 1 | 0 | 36 | 13 |
| York City | 2014–15 | League Two | 29 | 6 | 2 | 1 | 0 | 0 | 1 | 0 | 32 | 7 |
| York City | Total | | 61 | 16 | 4 | 4 | 1 | 0 | 2 | 0 | 68 | 20 |
| Motherwell | 2015–16 | Scottish Premiership | 14 | 1 | 0 | 0 | 0 | 0 | — | | 14 | 1 |
| The New Saints | 2016–17 | Welsh Premier League | 16 | 1 | 1 | 0 | 3 | 0 | 3 (Note: Appearances in Scottish Challenge Cup) | 0 | 23 | 1 |
| Career total | | | 123 | 23 | 7 | 4 | 6 | 0 | 8 | 0 | 144 | 27 |

== Honours ==
The New Saints

- Welsh Premier League: 2016–17
