= Lee Grant (footballer, born 1983) =

English footballer (born 1983)

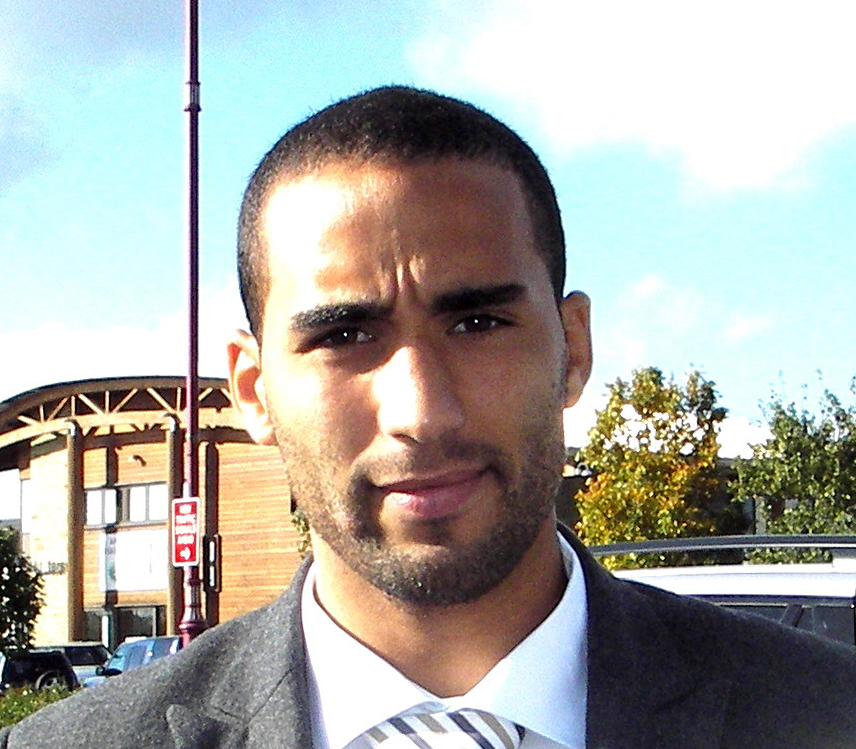
- Grant in 2006

Personal information
- Full name: Lee Anderson Grant
- Date of birth: 27 January 1983 (age 43)
- Place of birth: Hemel Hempstead, England
- Height: 6 ft 4 in (1.93 m)
- Position: Goalkeeper

Team information
- Current team: Walsall (head coach)

Youth career
- 1998–2000: Watford

Senior career*
Years	Team	Apps	(Gls)
2000–2007	Derby County	74	(0)
2005–2006	→ Burnley (loan)	1	(0)
2006	→ Oldham Athletic (loan)	16	(0)
2007–2010	Sheffield Wednesday	136	(0)
2010–2013	Burnley	114	(0)
2013–2017	Derby County	96	(0)
2016–2017	→ Stoke City (loan)	15	(0)
2017–2018	Stoke City	16	(0)
2018–2022	Manchester United	0	(0)
Total		468	(0)

International career
2000	England U16	6	(0)
2000–2001	England U17	2	(0)
2001	England U18	1	(0)
2001–2002	England U19	9	(0)
2003–2004	England U21	4	(0)

Managerial career
- 2025–2026: Huddersfield Town
- 2026–: Walsall
- * Club domestic league appearances and goals

Lee Anderson Grant (born 27 January 1983) is an English football coach and former professional footballer who is currently the head coach of EFL League Two club Walsall.

As a player, he was a goalkeeper and began his professional career with Derby County, making his Football League debut in September 2002. Grant spent five seasons with Derby, during which time he went out on loan to Burnley and Oldham Athletic. He joined Sheffield Wednesday in July 2007 and established himself as first-choice goalkeeper, playing in 136 consecutive matches. He moved to Burnley in July 2010, where he made 126 appearances in three seasons, before returning to Derby County in May 2013. Grant joined Stoke City in August 2016, initially on loan, before a permanent transfer in January 2017. He spent two seasons at Stoke before moving to Manchester United in July 2018 where he remained before retiring in at the end of the 2021–22 season.

== Career ==
=== Derby County ===
Grant began his career at Watford in 1998 - regularly featuring for the fanzine football team when his schedule allowed - but did not make any appearances and joined Derby County as a trainee in 2000. He made his debut for the Rams in the 2002–03 season in a First Division game against Burnley on 7 September 2002, replacing the injured Andy Oakes. He went on to win the club's Young Player of the Year award at the end of the season after playing a total of 30 games. By the end of the season, Grant had established himself as a regular in the England youth set-up, and joined the under-21 team for a training session in Sardinia prior to the European Championship qualifying games against Serbia & Montenegro and Slovakia in June 2003.

Grant finally made his debut for England under-21s on 9 September 2003 after Chris Kirkland injured himself during the pre-match warm-up prior to the European Championship qualifier against Portugal, and went on to make a further three appearances for the youth side. Meanwhile, a string of good performances for Derby following another injury to Andy Oakes earned him a three-and-a-half-year contract extension on 29 January 2004. Grant was voted into fourth place in the fan's Player of the Year award at the end of the 2003–04 season.

Derby's young 'keeper Lee Camp was given a chance during the 2004–05 pre-season after a highly successful loan spell at Queens Park Rangers the previous season. Camp impressed in the game and as a result Grant found himself on the bench at the start of the season despite his recent good form. The move led to press reports that Grant was surplus to requirements at Pride Park, however manager George Burley dismissed the story as "total speculation with no basis in fact". Around the same time, Grant also found himself ousted from the England under-21 squad by Camp.

Grant would have to wait until 19 October to make his first appearance of the season for Derby, when he replaced Lee Camp in goal following Camp's sending-off against Wolves. Grant went on to start the following match against Burnley whilst Camp served a suspension for the red card, but would not play another first team game for the remainder of the season. Lee Camp sympathised with Grant at the time, saying: "It's tough for Granty and I would be frustrated in his situation. He came in for the Burnley game and did nothing wrong but I think I've done enough this season to warrant my place in the side". Grant's woes were added to when he suffered a wrist injury in training in March 2005. The injury was followed by a shoulder problem the following month which required surgery and kept the goalkeeper out of action for several months.

Grant was given a chance by new Derby boss Phil Brown during the 2005–06 pre-season, but was again relegated to the bench by the start of the season. He played his first game of the season on 24 August 2005 as Derby crashed out of the League Cup at the hands of Grimsby Town. Another injury followed a fortnight later when Grant fractured his metatarsal during training, and was out of action for another two weeks.

==== Loan to Burnley ====
After playing just three games in 18 months, Grant was allowed to join Championship club Burnley on a one-month loan on 15 November 2005 as cover for the suspended Brian Jensen. Grant went straight into the team and made his debut for Burnley against Leicester City on 19 November, but despite a one-month extension to the loan, Grant failed to force Jensen out as first-choice 'keeper and did not play again for the first team before returning to Derby. Grant returned to his parent club on 14 January 2006 with Burnley manager Steve Cotterill claiming that the club were unable to continue to pay his high wages and that "he may go on loan somewhere else where he will play all the time".

==== Loan to Oldham Athletic ====
On 31 January 2006 he was loaned by Derby to League One team Oldham Athletic on a deal until the end of the season. Oldham manager Ronnie Moore revealed at the time that he feared that the deal would collapse after being agreed by Phil Brown following Brown's sacking as Derby manager on 30 January, however Derby honoured the deal which had already been agreed and the transfer was completed. The deal forced Lance Cronin out of the club as Oldham were unable to pay the wages of three senior goalkeepers. Grant made his debut for the Lactics in the 1–0 home defeat to Port Vale on 4 February 2006. He quickly established himself as first-choice goalkeeper and went on to make a total of sixteen league appearances for Oldham. In March 2006 Moore revealed that he was looking at making Grant's transfer permanent, but despite the player stating that he would like to make the switch permanent, no offer was made following Moore departing Oldham on 1 June 2006.

==== Return from loans ====
Grant was again given a chance during the 2006–07 pre-season, and Derby manager Billy Davies awarded him with a starting place for the club's second league game of the season against Stoke City on 8 August 2006. However, the arrival of Stephen Bywater on 12 August 2006 further limited Grant's first team opportunities. Following Bywater picking up a thigh injury and Camp's loan move to Norwich City, Grant was able to string together six appearances in September and October 2006, but after Bywater's return to fitness he was again left out of the team until his final appearance for Derby against Ipswich Town on 14 April 2007 when he came on a substitute after Bywater had been shown a red card. Bywater was handed a one-match ban, however Lee Camp was recalled from his loan and took his place in the following match. Grant's contract expired on 2 July 2007 and an extension was not offered by Derby.

=== Sheffield Wednesday ===
Grant signed a three-year contract with Championship club Sheffield Wednesday on 2 July 2007, joining at the same time as another young 'keeper, Robert Burch. Despite goalkeeping coach Billy Mercer stating that there would be "no number one or number two", Grant was given the number one shirt and, despite some poor early form, established himself as first-choice goalkeeper.

Grant was praised by Brian Laws after the Queens Park Rangers game on 24 November 2007 after making a string of excellent saves, with the manager stating "It was a performance which gives encouragement to everybody and shows what a good goalkeeper Lee Grant can be." Laws again heaped praise on his goalkeeper on 1 January 2008, claiming that he has "probably been the most outstanding keeper in the league in terms of current form." Grant played an integral part in maintaining Sheffield Wednesday's Championship status during the 2007–08 campaign with many excellent performances including a crucial and memorable save on the final day against Norwich City at Hillsborough. In the 2008–09 campaign, Grant won PFA Fans' Championship player of the Month on top of being Wednesdays' current player of the year. In the second Steel City derby of the season Grant pulled off another memorable save from Billy Sharp holding onto Wednesdays' 2–1 lead and complete their first League double over the Blades for 95 years.

=== Burnley ===
On 27 July 2010, Grant returned to Burnley for a fee of around £1 million, after three earlier bids failed. He linked up with his former Sheffield Wednesday manager Brian Laws as backup to Brian Jensen. Grant played 130 times for Burnley in a three-year spell and won the fans' player of the season award in 2012–13.

=== Return to Derby County ===
On 7 May 2013, it was confirmed the Grant would return to Derby County on a three-year contract after his contract with Burnley expired on 1 July 2013. Grant went into the 2013–14 season as the first-choice goalkeeper and played every minute of every league and cup game that season. He made his first appearance for Derby in over six years in a 1–1 draw at home to Blackburn Rovers on 4 August and kept his first clean sheet of the season two days later, pulling off several saves as Derby beat Oldham Athletic 1–0 in the first round of the League Cup. In the following game, he made an important late save to ensure the club's first league victory of the season, in a 2–1 win at Brighton & Hove Albion.

He made another good save in a 3–0 win at Yeovil Town on 24 August and kept his third clean sheet of the season in a 5–0 win over Brentford on 27 August but was at fault for a goal in Derby's 2–2 draw at Bolton Wanderers on 17 September. He made a string of saves and denied Darius Henderson from the penalty spot during The Rams' match against fierce rivals Nottingham Forest on 28 September, but could not stop 10-man Derby from losing 1–0. He recorded back-to-back clean sheets on 9 and 23 November, in a 3–0 win against Sheffield Wednesday and a 1–0 win at AFC Bournemouth, respectively. His sixth clean sheet of the season came in a 2–0 win against Charlton Athletic on 14 December.

Grant conceded four goals as Derby lost 4–1 to rivals Leicester City on 10 January, but was powerless to stop them and made several good saves to keep the score down. In the following game, a 1–0 win against Brighton & Hove Albion, Grant made a "stunning" reaction save to deny Matthew Upson's header from a corner and made a great late save to prevent Leonardo Ulloa from equalising. Grant's form drew praise from Derby's goalkeeping coach Eric Steele, who lauded Grant's concentration and said that Grant "will be delighted with his performance and he was part of a [defence] that kept us in the game."

=== Stoke City ===
On 31 August 2016, Grant joined Premier League club Stoke City on a six-month loan to provide cover for the injured Jack Butland. On 24 September, he made his Premier League debut at the age of 33 in a 1–1 home draw against West Bromwich Albion. Grant then put in a man of the match performance against Manchester United on 2 October 2016 as Stoke earned their first point at Old Trafford since 1980. Grant then kept back-to-back clean sheets in wins over Sunderland and Hull City earning praise from Stoke chairman Peter Coates.

On 4 January 2017, after impressing during his loan spell with six clean sheets in 15 league appearances in the 2016–17 season, Grant joined Stoke City on a two-and-a-half-year deal for a fee of £1.3 million. Grant retained his place in the team until Butland returned from injury in April 2017. Grant played 30 times in 2016–17 as Stoke finished in 13th position and his performances earned him the player of the year award. Grant was second-choice to Jack Butland in 2017–18, playing five times as Stoke were relegated to the EFL Championship.

=== Manchester United ===
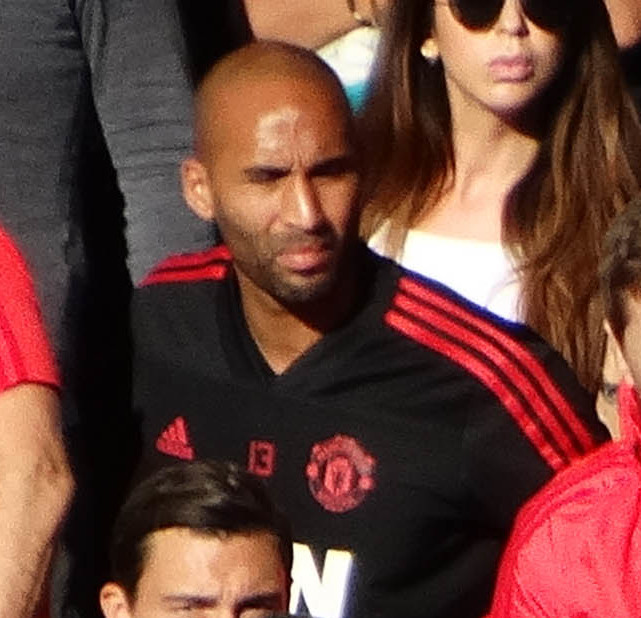
Grant in 2018

Grant signed for Premier League club Manchester United on 3 July 2018 on a two-year contract for an undisclosed fee, reported to be £1.5 million. He was assigned the number 13 shirt. Grant made his debut for Manchester United on 25 September 2018, as a substitute for Juan Mata, after Sergio Romero was sent off, in an EFL Cup tie against Derby County. United lost 8–7 on penalties following a 2–2 draw.

He made his first start for the club, and his European debut, on 28 November 2019 in a 2–1 loss away to Astana in the UEFA Europa League.

On 5 March 2020, Grant signed a contract extension with Manchester United until the end of the 2020–21 season. On 2 July 2021, he signed another contract extension with the club until the end of the 2021–22 season. In May 2022, he announced his retirement at the end of the season.

== Coaching career ==
On 26 May 2022, after announcing his retirement from playing, Grant was appointed first-team coach at Ipswich Town.

On 28 May 2025, Grant was appointed manager of League One side Huddersfield Town on a three-year contract. In January 2026, after eight months in the role, he was sacked by the club.

On 14 May 2026, Grant was appointed manager of League Two side Walsall on a three-year contract.

== Personal life ==
Born in England, Grant is of Jamaican descent. His son, True Grant, is also a goalkeeper playing for Stoke City.

== Career statistics ==
Appearances and goals by club, season and competition
Club	Season	League			FA Cup		League Cup		Europe		Other		Total	
Club	Season	Division	Apps	Goals	Apps	Goals	Apps	Goals	Apps	Goals	Apps	Goals	Apps	Goals
Derby County	2002–03	First Division	29	0	1	0	0	0	—		—		30	0
Derby County	2003–04	First Division	36	0	1	0	1	0	—		—		38	0
Derby County	2004–05	Championship	2	0	0	0	0	0	—		0	0	2	0
Derby County	2005–06	Championship	0	0	0	0	1	0	—		—		1	0
Derby County	2006–07	Championship	7	0	0	0	1	0	—		0	0	8	0
Derby County	Total		74	0	2	0	3	0	—		0	0	79	0
Burnley (loan)	2005–06	Championship	1	0	—		—		—		—		1	0
Oldham Athletic (loan)	2005–06	League One	16	0	—		—		—		—		16	0
Sheffield Wednesday	2007–08	Championship	44	0	2	0	2	0	—		—		48	0
Sheffield Wednesday	2008–09	Championship	46	0	1	0	1	0	—		—		48	0
Sheffield Wednesday	2009–10	Championship	46	0	1	0	2	0	—		—		49	0
Sheffield Wednesday	Total		136	0	4	0	5	0	—		—		145	0
Burnley	2010–11	Championship	25	0	3	0	3	0	—		—		31	0
Burnley	2011–12	Championship	43	0	1	0	4	0	—		—		48	0
Burnley	2012–13	Championship	46	0	0	0	1	0	—		—		47	0
Burnley	Total		114	0	4	0	8	0	—		—		126	0
Derby County	2013–14	Championship	46	0	1	0	3	0	—		3 (Note: Appearances in Championship play-offs)	0	53	0
Derby County	2014–15	Championship	40	0	0	0	3	0	—		—		43	0
Derby County	2015–16	Championship	10	0	0	0	1	0	—		0	0	11	0
Derby County	Total		96	0	1	0	7	0	—		3	0	107	0
Stoke City	2016–17	Premier League	28	0	1	0	1	0	—		—		30	0
Stoke City	2017–18	Premier League	3	0	0	0	2	0	—		—		5	0
Stoke City	Total		31	0	1	0	3	0	—		—		35	0
Manchester United	2018–19	Premier League	0	0	0	0	1	0	0	0	—		1	0
Manchester United	2019–20	Premier League	0	0	0	0	0	0	1 (Note: Appearance in UEFA Europa League)	0	—		1	0
Manchester United	2020–21	Premier League	0	0	0	0	0	0	0	0	—		0	0
Manchester United	2021–22	Premier League	0	0	0	0	0	0	0	0	—		0	0
Manchester United	Total		0	0	0	0	1	0	1	0	—		2	0
Career total			468	0	12	0	27	0	1	0	3	0	511	0

== Managerial statistics ==
As of match played 21 November 2026

Managerial record by team and tenure
Team	From	To	Record					Ref
Team	From	To	P	W	D	L	Win %	Ref
Huddersfield Town	28 May 2025	17 January 2026	36	15	8	13	41.7	
Walsall	14 May 2026	Present	20	7	9	4	35.0	
Total			56	22	17	17	39.3	

== Honours ==
=== Player ===
Manchester United

- UEFA Europa League runner-up: 2020–21

=== First Team Coach ===
Ipswich Town

- EFL Championship runner-up: 2023–24

Individual

- Derby County Young Player of the Year: 2002–03
- Sheffield Wednesday Player of the Year: 2009–10
- Burnley Player of the Year: 2012–13
- Stoke City Player of the Year: 2016–17
