= Adam Evans =

Irish footballer

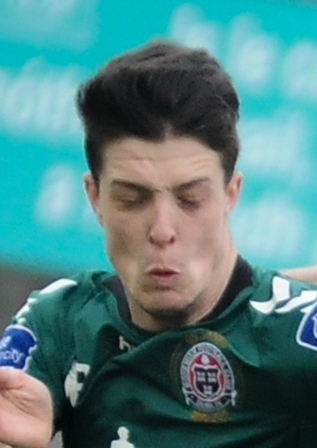
- Adam Evans of Bohemians in 2015

Personal information
- Full name: Adam George Evans
- Date of birth: 3 May 1994 (age 32)
- Place of birth: Dublin, Ireland
- Position: Midfielder

Team information
- Current team: Ayrfield United

Youth career
- Belvedere
- 2010–2012: Burnley

Senior career*
Years	Team	Apps	(Gls)
2012–2013	Burnley	0	(0)
2012	→ Droylsden (loan)	4	(1)
2013–2014	Inverness Caledonian Thistle	2	(0)
2014–2016	Bohemians	35	(6)
2016–2018	Shelbourne	64	(15)
2019–2020	Longford Town	25	(3)
2021	Warrenpoint Town	14	(1)
2023-	Ayrfield United		

International career
2013	Republic of Ireland U19	3	(0)
- * Club domestic league appearances and goals as of 15 November 2020

Adam George Evans (born 3 May 1994) is an Irish footballer who plays as a midfielder for Dublin-based side Ayrfield United.

== Career ==
Born in Dublin, Evans joined the youth system of Burnley in 2010 on a two-year scholarship, having previously played for Irish side Belvedere. He was part of the youth team that reached the semi-finals of the FA Youth Cup in 2012, eventually losing to rivals Blackburn Rovers. In May 2012, Evans signed a professional one-year contract following the completion of his scholarship. In September 2012, Evans joined Conference North side Droylsden on an initial one-month loan. He made his debut for the club in a 2–1 league defeat to Worcester City. His first goal for the club, a superb shot from outside the box, earned the Bloods three points against Gloucester City in a 1–0 win. His loan was later extended, with Evans playing his final game for Droylsden in December in a 5–1 defeat to Boston United. He made a total of six appearances for the club in all competitions, scoring once. In May 2013, Evans was released by Burnley due to the expiry of his contract.

In June 2013, he joined Scottish Premiership side Inverness Caledonian Thistle on a free transfer. His professional debut for the club came in January 2014, in a 1–0 away win at Aberdeen, where he replaced Billy McKay as a substitute.
Though not included in the first team, Evans would spend his playing time at the club's reserve, making an impressive display.

Evans was released by Inverness at the end of the 2013–14 season.

After returning home, Evans immediately joined Bohemians in the League of Ireland Premier Division where he spent 2 years before making the short move to northside rivals Shelbourne in July 2016. Following two-and-a-half seasons with Shels, Evans moved to Longford Town in November 2018 ahead of the 2019 season.

Evans was part of the Longford squad which achieved promotion to the League of Ireland Premier Division, following the play-offs, at the end of the 2020 League of Ireland First Division season. He was released by Longford in December 2020.

== International career ==
Evans has represented the Republic of Ireland at under-15, under-16 and under-19 level. He made his debut for the under-19's in a friendly against Czech Republic in February 2013, which ended in a 2–1 win. He also played in the corresponding fixture a week later which finished 1–1. His competitive debut came in the 2013 UEFA European Under-19 Championship elite qualification match against Slovakia which ended in a 2–2 draw.
