= 2016–17 Burnley F.C. season =

English football club season

Burnley
2016–17 season
- Chairman: Mike Garlick
- Manager: Sean Dyche
- Stadium: Turf Moor
- Premier League: 16th
- FA Cup: Fifth round
- League Cup: Second round
- Top goalscorer: League: Sam Vokes (10); All: Sam Vokes (12)
- Highest home attendance: 21,870 (v Manchester United, Premier League, 23 April 2017)
- Lowest home attendance: 12,257 (v Sunderland, FA Cup, 17 January 2017)
- Average home league attendance: 20,558
Home colours	Away colours	Third colours

The 2016–17 season was Burnley's 135th competitive season and their first season back in the Premier League, just one campaign after their relegation in 2014–15. Along with the Premier League, the club also competed in the FA Cup and Football League Cup. The season covers the period from 1 July 2016 to 30 June 2017.

Burnley finished 16th in the table, avoiding relegation for the first time in the Premier League era.

== Match details ==
=== Premier League ===
==== League table ====
Pos	Team	Pld	W	D	L	GF	GA	GD	Pts	Qualification or relegation
14	Crystal Palace	38	12	5	21	50	63	−13	41	
15	Swansea City	38	12	5	21	45	70	−25	41	
16	Burnley	38	11	7	20	39	55	−16	40	
17	Watford	38	11	7	20	40	68	−28	40	
18	Hull City (R)	38	9	7	22	37	80	−43	34	Relegation to EFL Championship

Source: Premier League
Rules for classification: 1) Points; 2) Goal difference; 3) Goals scored; 4) Play-offs (only if needed to decide champion, teams for relegation or teams for UEFA competitions).
(R) Relegated

==== Matches ====
Premier League match details
Date	League position	Opponents	Venue	Result	Score F–A	Scorers	Attendance	Ref
13 August 2016	19th	Swansea City	H	L	0–1		19,126	
20 August 2016	7th	Liverpool	H	W	2–0	Vokes 2', Gray 37'	21,313	
27 August 2016	13th	Chelsea	A	L	0–3		41,607	
10 September 2016	13th	Hull City	H	D	1–1	Defour 72'	18,803	
17 September 2016	15th	Leicester City	A	L	0–3		31,916	
26 September 2016	13th	Watford	H	W	2–0	Hendrick 38', Keane 50'	18,519	
2 October 2016	14th	Arsenal	H	L	0–1		20,982	
16 October 2016	14th	Southampton	A	L	1–3	Vokes 72' pen.	29,040	
22 October 2016	14th	Everton	H	W	2–1	Vokes 39', Arfield 90'	21,416	
29 October 2016	13th	Manchester United	A	D	0–0		75,325	
5 November 2016	9th	Crystal Palace	H	W	3–2	Vokes 2', Guðmundsson 14', Barnes 90+4'	19,196	
21 November 2016	12th	West Bromwich Albion	A	L	0–4		23,016	
26 November 2016	12th	Manchester City	H	L	1–2	Marney 14'	21,794	
3 December 2016	14th	Stoke City	A	L	0–2		27,306	
10 December 2016	13th	AFC Bournemouth	H	W	3–2	Hendrick 13', Ward 16', Boyd 75'	19,680	
14 December 2016	13th	West Ham United	A	L	0–1		56,990	
18 December 2016	16th	Tottenham Hotspur	A	L	1–2	Barnes 21'	31,467	
26 December 2016	14th	Middlesbrough	H	W	1–0	Gray 80'	21,562	
31 December 2016	11th	Sunderland	H	W	4–1	Gray (3) 31', 51', 53', Barnes pen. 67'	21,124	
2 January 2017	11th	Manchester City	A	L	1–2	Mee 70'	54,463	
14 January 2017	10th	Southampton	H	W	1–0	Barton 78'	20,254	
22 January 2017	13th	Arsenal	A	L	1–2	Gray 90+3' pen.	59,955	
31 January 2017	9th	Leicester City	H	W	1–0	Vokes 78'	19,202	
4 February 2017	12th	Watford	A	L	1–2	Barnes 78' pen.	20,178	
12 February 2017	12th	Chelsea	H	D	1–1	Brady 24'	21,744	
26 February 2017	11th	Hull City	A	D	1–1	Keane 76'	20,156	
4 March 2017	12th	Swansea City	A	L	2–3	Gray (2) 20' pen., 61'	20,679	
12 March 2017	12th	Liverpool	A	L	1–2	Barnes 7'	53,145	
18 March 2017	13th	Sunderland	A	D	0–0		41,518	
1 April 2017	15th	Tottenham Hotspur	H	L	0–2		21,684	
4 April 2017	12th	Stoke City	H	W	1–0	Boyd 58'	19,881	
8 April 2017	12th	Middlesbrough	A	D	0–0		29,547	
15 April 2017	14th	Everton	A	L	1–3	Vokes 52' pen.	39,328	
23 April 2017	16th	Manchester United	H	L	0–2		21,870	
29 April 2017	14th	Crystal Palace	A	W	2–0	Barnes 8', Gray 85'	25,013	
6 May 2017	14th	West Bromwich Albion	H	D	2–2	Vokes (2) 55', 86'	20,825	
13 May 2017	14th	AFC Bournemouth	A	L	1–2	Vokes 83'	11,388	
21 May 2017	16th	West Ham United	H	L	1–2	Vokes 24'	21,634	

=== FA Cup ===
FA Cup match details
Round	Date	Opponents	Venue	Result	Score F–A	Scorers	Attendance	Ref
Third round	7 January 2017	Sunderland	A	D	0–0		17,632	
Third round replay	17 January 2017	Sunderland	H	W	2–0	Vokes 44', Gray 83'	12,257	
Fourth round	28 January 2017	Bristol City	H	W	2–0	Vokes 45', Defour 68'	14,921	
Fifth round	18 February 2017	Lincoln City	H	L	0–1		19,185	

=== EFL Cup ===
EFL Cup match details
Round	Date	Opponents	Venue	Result	Score F–A	Scorers	Attendance	Ref
Second round	24 August 2016	Accrington Stanley	A	L	0–1 (a.e.t.)		3,170	

== Transfers ==
=== In ===
Date	Player	Club†	Fee	Ref
30 June 2016	Robbie Leitch	Motherwell	Free	
30 June 2016	Jamie Thomas	Bolton Wanderers	Free	
13 July 2016	Jimmy Dunne	Manchester United	Free	
19 July 2016	Jóhann Berg Guðmundsson	Charlton Athletic	Undisclosed	
19 July 2016	Nick Pope	Charlton Athletic	Undisclosed	
16 August 2016	Steven Defour	Anderlecht	Undisclosed	
31 August 2016	Jeff Hendrick	Derby County	Undisclosed	
1 January 2017	Joey Barton	(Rangers)	Free	
31 January 2017	Ashley Westwood	Aston Villa	Undisclosed	
31 January 2017	Robbie Brady	Norwich City	Undisclosed	
12 February 2017	Harry Flowers	Brocton	Free	
24 February 2017	Harry Limb	Wisbech Town	Free	

† Brackets around club names denote the player's contract with that club had expired before he joined Burnley.

=== Out ===
Date	Player	Club†	Fee	Ref
1 July 2016	Joey Barton	Rangers	Released	
1 July 2016	Luke Conlan	Morecambe	Released	
1 July 2016	Michael Duff		Retired	
1 July 2016	Lloyd Dyer	(Burton Albion)	Released	
1 July 2016	Jason Gilchrist	(FC United of Manchester)	Released	
1 July 2016	Matt Gilks	Rangers	Released	
1 July 2016	Danijel Nizic	(Morecambe)	Released	
1 July 2016	Brandon Wilson	(Perth Glory)	Released	
1 July 2016	Matthew Taylor	(Northampton Town)	Released	
16 August 2016	David Jones	Sheffield Wednesday	Undisclosed	
31 August 2016	Cameron Dummigan	Oldham Athletic	Undisclosed	
31 August 2016	Renny Smith	Vicenza	Undisclosed	
3 January 2017	Lukas Jutkiewicz	Birmingham City	Undisclosed	
13 January 2017	Daniel Lafferty	Sheffield United	Undisclosed	

† Brackets around club names denote the player joined that club after his Burnley contract expired.

=== Loan in ===
Date	Player	Club	Return	Ref
5 August 2016	Jon Flanagan	Liverpool	End of season	
30 August 2016	Patrick Bamford	Chelsea	14 January 2017	

=== Loan out ===
Date	Player	Club	Return	Ref
19 July 2016	Jamie Thomas	Ayr United	21 October 2016	
26 July 2016	Alex Whitmore	Morecambe	End of season	
28 July 2016	Josh Ginnelly	Walsall	3 January 2017	
9 August 2016	Khius Metz	Altrincham	8 September 2016	
12 August 2016	George Green	Kilmarnock	2 January 2017	
12 August 2016	Chris Long	Fleetwood Town	30 January 2017	
13 August 2016	Tony Aghayere	Colne	End of season	
18 August 2016	Dan Agyei	Coventry City	3 January 2017	
19 August 2016	Luke Hendrie	Kilmarnock	End of season	
22 August 2016	Rouwen Hennings	Fortuna Düsseldorf	End of season	
31 August 2016	Tom Anderson	Chesterfield	End of season	
31 August 2016	Lukas Jutkiewicz	Birmingham City	2 January 2017	
31 August 2016	Daniel Lafferty	Sheffield United	13 January 2017	
31 August 2016	Ntumba Massanka	Morecambe	2 January 2017	
31 August 2016	Fredrik Ulvestad	Charlton Athletic	End of season	
12 January 2017	Ntumba Massanka	Wrexham	End of season	
28 January 2017	George Green	Salford City	End of season	
30 January 2017	Chris Long	Bolton Wanderers	End of season	
30 January 2017	Josh Ginnelly	Lincoln City	End of season	
31 January 2017	Michael Kightly	Burton Albion	End of season	
31 January 2017	Aiden O'Neill	Oldham Athletic	End of season	
31 January 2017	Brad Jackson	Bangor City	End of season	

== Appearances and goals ==
Numbers in parentheses denote appearances as substitute.
Players with names struck through and marked † left the club during the playing season.
Players with names in italics and marked * were on loan from another club for the whole of their season with Burnley.
Players listed with no appearances have been in the matchday squad but only as unused substitutes.
Key to positions: GK – Goalkeeper; DF – Defender; MF – Midfielder; FW – Forward

Players contracted for the 2016–17 season
No.	Pos.	Nat.	Name	League		FA Cup		League Cup		Total		Discipline	
No.	Pos.	Nat.	Name	Apps	Goals	Apps	Goals	Apps	Goals	Apps	Goals	A yellow rectangle, denoting the yellow penalty card shown to a player being cautioned	A red rectangle, denoting the red penalty card shown to a player being sent off
1	GK	ENG	Tom Heaton	35	0	1	0	0	0	36	0	1	0
2	DF	ENG	Matthew Lowton	36	0	0	0	0	0	36	0	9	0
3	DF	NIR	~~Daniel Lafferty~~ †	0	0	0	0	0	0	0	0	0	0
4	DF	ENG	Jon Flanagan *	3 (3)	0	3	0	1	0	7 (3)	0	2	0
5	DF	ENG	Michael Keane	35	2	4	0	0	0	39	2	4	0
6	DF	ENG	Ben Mee	34	1	1	0	0	0	35	1	5	0
7	FW	ENG	Andre Gray	26 (6)	9	2 (1)	1	0 (1)	0	28 (8)	10	2	0
8	MF	ENG	Dean Marney	21	1	0	0	0	0	21	1	7	0
9	FW	WAL	Sam Vokes	21 (16)	10	4	2	1	0	26 (16)	12	1	0
10	FW	ENG	Ashley Barnes	20 (8)	6	0 (3)	0	0	0	20 (11)	6	8	1
11	MF	ENG	Michael Kightly	1 (4)	0	1 (2)	0	1	0	3 (6)	0	0	0
12	MF	IRL	Robbie Brady	7 (7)	1	0	0	0	0	7 (7)	1	1	0
13	MF	IRL	Jeff Hendrick	31 (1)	2	1 (2)	0	0	0	32 (3)	2	6	1
14	MF	ENG	~~David Jones~~ †	1	0	0	0	0	0	1	0	1	0
15	FW	ENG	~~Patrick Bamford *~~ †	0 (6)	0	0	0	0	0	0 (6)	0	0	0
16	MF	BEL	Steven Defour	16 (5)	1	3	1	0	0	19 (5)	2	2	0
17	GK	ENG	Paul Robinson	3	0	0	0	0	0	3	0	0	0
18	FW	GER	~~Rouwen Hennings~~ †	0	0	0	0	0	0	0	0	0	0
18	MF	ENG	Ashley Westwood	6 (3)	0	1	0	0	0	7 (3)	0	3	0
19	FW	ENG	~~Lukas Jutkiewicz~~ †	0 (2)	0	0	0	1	0	1 (2)	0	0	0
19	MF	ENG	Joey Barton	12 (2)	1	4	0	0	0	16 (2)	1	7	0
20	MF	NOR	Fredrik Ulvestad	0	0	0	0	1	0	1	0	1	0
21	MF	SCO	George Boyd	33 (3)	2	1 (1)	0	0 (1)	0	34 (5)	2	3	0
23	DF	IRL	Stephen Ward	37	1	1	0	0	0	38	1	5	0
24	FW	ENG	Chris Long	0	0	0	0	0	0	0	0	0	0
25	MF	ISL	Jóhann Berg Guðmundsson	10 (10)	1	3	0	1	0	14 (10)	1	1	0
26	DF	ENG	James Tarkowski	4 (15)	0	4	0	1	0	9 (15)	0	2	0
27	DF	ZIM	Tendayi Darikwa	0	0	4	0	1	0	5	0	2	0
28	DF	IRL	Kevin Long	3	0	0	0	1	0	4	0	0	0
29	GK	ENG	Nick Pope	0	0	3	0	1	0	4	0	0	0
32	FW	ENG	Dan Agyei	0 (3)	0	0	0	0	0	0 (3)	0	0	0
34	DF	ENG	Tom Anderson	0	0	0	0	0	0	0	0	0	0
36	GK	NIR	Conor Mitchell	0	0	0	0	0	0	0	0	0	0
37	MF	CAN	Scott Arfield	23 (8)	1	3	0	0 (1)	0	26 (9)	1	3	0
38	DF	NIR	~~Cameron Dummigan~~ †	0	0	0	0	0	0	0	0	0	0
41	MF	AUS	Aiden O'Neill	0 (3)	0	0 (1)	0	1	0	1 (4)	0	0	0
43	MF	ENG	Brad Jackson	0	0	0	0	0	0	0	0	0	0
46	FW	ENG	Ntumba Massanka	0	0	0	0	0	0	0	0	0	0

== See also ==
- List of Burnley F.C. seasons
