= 2014–15 Burnley F.C. season =

English football club season

Burnley F.C.
2014–15 season
- Chairman: John Banaszkiewicz; Mike Garlick
- Manager: Sean Dyche
- Ground: Turf Moor
- Premier League: 19th (Relegated)
- FA Cup: Third round
- League Cup: Second round
- Top goalscorer: League: Danny Ings (11); All: Danny Ings (11)
- Highest home attendance: 21,335 (v Liverpool, Premier League, 26 December 2014)
- Lowest home attendance: 4,979 (v Sheffield Wednesday, League Cup, 26 August 2014)
- Average home league attendance: 19,131
Home colours	Away colours	Third colours

The 2014–15 season was Burnley's first season back in the Premier League in four years after gaining promotion in the previous season. They also competed in the League Cup and the FA Cup.

== Match details ==
=== Premier League ===
==== League table ====
Pos	Team	Pld	W	D	L	GF	GA	GD	Pts	Qualification or relegation
16	Sunderland	38	7	17	14	31	53	−22	38	
17	Aston Villa	38	10	8	20	31	57	−26	38	
18	Hull City (R)	38	8	11	19	33	51	−18	35	Relegation to Football League Championship
19	Burnley (R)	38	7	12	19	28	53	−25	33	Relegation to Football League Championship
20	Queens Park Rangers (R)	38	8	6	24	42	73	−31	30	Relegation to Football League Championship

Source: Barclays Premier League
Rules for classification: 1) Points; 2) Goal difference; 3) Goals scored; 4) Play-offs (only if needed to decide champion, teams for relegation or teams for UEFA competitions).
(R) Relegated

==== Matches ====
Date	League position	Opponents	Venue	Result	Score F–A	Scorers	Attendance	Ref
18 August 2014	19th	Chelsea	H	L	1–3	Arfield 14'	20,699 (3,808 away)	
23 August 2014	20th	Swansea City	A	L	0–1		20,565 (1,000 away)	
30 August 2014	20th	Manchester United	H	D	0–0		21,009 (4,099 away)	
13 September 2014	18th	Crystal Palace	A	D	0–0		23,829 (1,800 away)	
20 September 2014	17th	Sunderland	H	D	0–0		20,026 (3,964 away)	
28 September 2014	20th	West Bromwich Albion	A	L	0–4		24,286 (1,800 away)	
4 October 2014	19th	Leicester City	A	D	2–2	Kightly 39', Wallace 90+6'	31,448 (2,196 away)	
18 October 2014	19th	West Ham United	H	L	1–3	Boyd 60'	18,936 (2,945 away)	
26 October 2014	19th	Everton	H	L	1–3	Ings 20'	19,927 (3,955 away)	
1 November 2014	20th	Arsenal	A	L	0–3		60,012 (3,000 away)	
8 November 2014	19th	Hull City	H	W	1–0	Barnes 50'	16,998 (1,574 away)	
22 November 2014	18th	Stoke City	A	W	2–1	Ings (2) 12' 13'	27,018 (2,464 away)	
29 November 2014	19th	Aston Villa	H	D	1–1	Ings 87' pen.	19,910 (4,046 away)	
2 December 2014	17th	Newcastle United	H	D	1–1	Boyd 34'	18,791 (2,906 away)	
6 December 2014	19th	Queens Park Rangers	A	L	0–2		17,785 (1,583 away)	
13 December 2014	17th	Southampton	H	W	1–0	Barnes 73'	17,287 (1,496 away)	
20 December 2014	18th	Tottenham Hotspur	A	L	1–2	Barnes 27'	35,681 (1,450 away)	
26 December 2014	19th	Liverpool	H	L	0–1		21,335 (4,012 away)	
28 December 2014	19th	Manchester City	A	D	2–2	Boyd 47', Barnes 81'	45,608 (2,900 away)	
1 January 2015	19th	Newcastle United	A	D	3–3	Dummett 19' o.g., Ings 66', Boyd 86'	51,761 (3,200 away)	
10 January 2015	17th	Queens Park Rangers	H	W	2–1	Arfield 12', Ings 37'	17,523 (1,104 away)	
17 January 2015	17th	Crystal Palace	H	L	2–3	Mee 12', Ings 16'	17,782 (1,754 away)	
31 January 2015	17th	Sunderland	A	L	0–2		44,022 (3,000 away)	
8 February 2015	17th	West Bromwich Albion	H	D	2–2	Barnes 11', Ings 32'	16,904 (1,187 away)	
11 February 2015	19th	Manchester United	A	L	1–3	Ings 12'	75,356 (3,100 away)	
21 February 2015	18th	Chelsea	A	D	1–1	Mee 81'	41,629 (1,590 away)	
28 February 2015	18th	Swansea City	H	L	0–1		17,388 (1,123 away)	
4 March 2015	19th	Liverpool	A	L	0–2		44,717 (2,900 away)	
14 March 2015	18th	Manchester City	H	W	1–0	Boyd 61'	21,216 (4,078 away)	
21 March 2015	18th	Southampton	A	L	0–2		30,864 (2,800 away)	
5 April 2015	18th	Tottenham Hotspur	H	D	0–0		18,829 (1,927 away)	
11 April 2015	19th	Arsenal	H	L	0–1		20,615 (3,421 away)	
18 April 2015	20th	Everton	A	L	0–1		39,496 (2,850 away)	
25 April 2015	20th	Leicester City	H	L	0–1		19,582 (2,400 away)	
2 May 2015	20th	West Ham United	A	L	0–1		34,946 (2,200 away)	
9 May 2015	19th	Hull City	A	W	1–0	Ings 62'	24,877 (2,500 away)	
16 May 2015	19th	Stoke City	H	D	0–0		18,636 (2,368 away)	
24 May 2015	19th	Aston Villa	A	W	1–0	Ings 6'	40,792 (1,500 away)	

=== FA Cup ===
Round	Date	Opponents	Venue	Result	Score F–A	Scorers	Attendance	Ref
Third round	5 January 2015	Tottenham Hotspur	H	D	1–1	Vokes 73'	9,348	
Third round replay	14 January 2015	Tottenham Hotspur	A	L	2–4	Sordell 3', Wallace 8'	24,367	

=== League Cup ===
Round	Date	Opponents	Venue	Result	Score F–A	Scorers	Attendance	Ref
Second round	26 August 2014	Sheffield Wednesday	H	L	0–1		4,979	

== Appearances and goals ==
Numbers in parentheses denote appearances as substitute.
Players with names struck through and marked † left the club during the playing season.
Players with names in italics and marked * were on loan from another club with Burnley.
Key to positions: GK – Goalkeeper; DF – Defender; MF – Midfielder; FW – Forward

No.	Pos.	Nat.	Name	League		FA Cup		League Cup		Total		Discipline	
No.	Pos.	Nat.	Name	Apps	Goals	Apps	Goals	Apps	Goals	Apps	Goals	A yellow rectangle, denoting the yellow penalty card shown to a player being cautioned	A red rectangle, denoting the red penalty card shown to a player being sent off
1	GK	ENG	Tom Heaton	38	0	2	0	0	0	40	0	1	0
2	DF	ENG	Kieran Trippier	38	0	2	0	1	0	41	0	2	0
3	DF	NIR	Daniel Lafferty	0 (1)	0	1	0	0	0	1 (1)	0	0	0
4	DF	NIR	Michael Duff	21	0	1	0	0	0	22	0	4	1
5	DF	ENG	Jason Shackell (C)	38	0	0	0	1	0	39	0	3	0
6	MF	ENG	Ben Mee	32 (1)	2	2	0	0	0	34 (1)	2	10	0
7	MF	SCO	Ross Wallace	1 (14)	1	1 (1)	1	1	0	3 (15)	2	2	0
8	MF	ENG	Dean Marney	20	0	1 (1)	0	0	0	21 (1)	0	6	0
9	FW	WAL	Sam Vokes	5 (10)	0	1 (1)	1	0	0	6 (11)	1	0	0
10	FW	ENG	Danny Ings	35	11	1	0	0 (1)	0	36 (1)	11	6	0
11	MF	ENG	Michael Kightly	10 (7)	1	2	0	1	0	13 (7)	1	3	0
12	GK	AUS	Alex Cisak	0	0	0	0	0	0	0	0	0	0
14	MF	ENG	David Jones	36	0	1	0	1	0	38	0	0	0
15	MF	ENG	Matthew Taylor	7 (3)	0	0	0	0 (1)	0	7 (4)	0	0	0
16	DF	ENG	Luke O'Neill	0	0	0	0	0	0	0	0	0	0
17	FW	ENG	Marvin Sordell	2 (12)	0	1 (1)	1	1	0	4 (13)	1	1	0
18	DF	IRL	Steven Reid	1 (6)	0	0 (1)	0	0	0	1 (7)	0	1	0
19	FW	ENG	Lukas Jutkiewicz	10 (15)	0	0	0	0 (1)	0	10 (16)	0	1	0
20	MF	ENG	~~Nathaniel Chalobah~~ * †	0 (4)	0	0	0	0	0	0 (4)	0	1	0
20	MF	NOR	Fredrik Ulvestad	1 (1)	0	0	0	0	0	1 (1)	0	1	0
21	MF	SCO	George Boyd	35	5	1 (1)	0	0	0	36 (1)	5	7	0
22	GK	SCO	Matt Gilks	0	0	0	0	1	0	1	0	0	0
23	DF	IRL	Stephen Ward	7 (2)	0	0	0	1	0	8 (2)	0	3	0
25	DF	ENG	Michael Keane	17 (4)	0	2	0	0	0	19 (4)	0	2	0
28	DF	IRL	Kevin Long	0 (1)	0	0	0	1	0	1 (1)	0	0	0
30	FW	ENG	Ashley Barnes	28 (7)	5	1	0	1	0	30 (7)	5	5	1
31	DF	AUS	~~Callum Richardson~~ †	0	0	0	0	0	0	0	0	0	0
32	MF	NZL	Cameron Howieson	0	0	0	0	0	0	0	0	0	0
33	MF	ENG	Steven Hewitt	0	0	0	0	0	0	0	0	0	0
34	DF	ENG	Tom Anderson	0	0	0	0	0	0	0	0	0	0
35	DF	ENG	Alex Whitmore	0	0	0	0	0	0	0	0	0	0
36	GK	NIR	Conor Mitchell	0	0	0	0	0	0	0	0	0	0
37	MF	CAN	Scott Arfield	36 (1)	2	2	0	1	0	39 (1)	2	7	0
38	DF	NIR	Cameron Dummigan	0	0	0	0	0	0	0	0	0	0
39	FW	SCO	Jamie Frost	0	0	0	0	0	0	0	0	0	0
40	GK	AUS	Danijel Nizic	0	0	0	0	0	0	0	0	0	0
41	MF	ENG	~~Jadan Hall~~ †	0	0	0	0	0	0	0	0	0	0
42	MF	ENG	Luke Daly	0	0	0	0	0	0	0	0	0	0
43	MF	IRL	Evan Galvin	0	0	0	0	0	0	0	0	0	0
44	FW	ENG	Jason Gilchrist	0	0	0	0	0	0	0	0	0	0
45	MF	ENG	Nathan Lowe	0	0	0	0	0	0	0	0	0	0
46	MF	AUS	Kevin Ly	0	0	0	0	0	0	0	0	0	0
48	DF	NIR	Luke Conlan	0	0	0	0	0	0	0	0	0	0

== Transfers ==
=== In ===
Date	Name	From	Fee	Ref
27 June 2014	Michael Kightly	Stoke City	Undisclosed	
2 July 2014	Matt Gilks	Blackpool	Free	
4 July 2014	Marvin Sordell	Bolton Wanderers	Undisclosed	
4 July 2014	Matthew Taylor	West Ham United	Free	
7 July 2014	Steven Reid	West Bromwich Albion	Free	
15 July 2014	Lukas Jutkiewicz	Middlesbrough	Undisclosed	
15 August 2014	Stephen Ward	Wolverhampton Wanderers	Undisclosed	
1 September 2014	George Boyd	Hull City	Undisclosed (Note: Fee reported as £3,000,000)	
8 January 2015	Michael Keane	Manchester United	Undisclosed (Note: Fee reported as £2,000,000)	
10 March 2015	Fredrik Ulvestad	Aalesund	Free	

=== Out ===
Date	Name	To	Fee	Ref
4 June 2014	Joseph Mills	Oldham Athletic	Free	
12 June 2014	David Edgar	Birmingham City	Free	
26 June 2014	Junior Stanislas	Bournemouth	Free	
30 June 2014	Kyle Brownhill	Hyde	Released	
30 June 2014	Alex Coleman	Colne	Released	
30 June 2014	Jack Errington	Newcastle Benfield	Released	
30 June 2014	Micah Evans	Southport	Released	
30 June 2014	Luke Gallagher	Shelbourne	Released	
30 June 2014	Nick Liversedge	Guisborough Town	Released	
30 June 2014	Archie Love	Hednesford Town	Released	
30 June 2014	Brian Stock	Havant & Waterlooville	Released	
30 June 2014	Keith Treacy	Barnsley	Released	
7 July 2014	Chris Baird	West Bromwich Albion	Free	
31 December 2014	Jadan Hall		Released	
27 February 2015	Callum Richardson		Released	

=== Loans in ===
Date	Name	From	End Date	Ref
1 September 2014	Nathaniel Chalobah	Chelsea	2 January 2015	
1 September 2014	Michael Keane	Manchester United	8 January 2015	

=== Loans out ===
Date	Name	To	End Date	Ref
18 August 2014	Luke O'Neill	Scunthorpe United	18 November 2014	
28 August 2014	Jadan Hall	Chester	27 September 2014	
19 September 2014	Tom Anderson	Lincoln City	19 October 2014	
24 October 2014	Alex Cisak	York City	4 January 2015	
24 October 2014	Danijel Nizic	Chorley	22 November 2014	
30 October 2014	Tom Anderson	Carlisle United	3 January 2015	
2 February 2015	Alex Cisak	Leyton Orient	3 May 2015	
26 February 2015	Luke O'Neill	Leyton Orient	3 May 2015	
5 March 2015	Daniel Lafferty	Rotherham United	2 May 2015	
6 March 2015	Jason Gilchrist	Accrington Stanley	3 May 2015	
26 March 2015	Steven Hewitt	Southport	30 June 2015	

== See also ==
- List of Burnley F.C. seasons
