= Nižić =

Nižić (Croatian pronunciation: [nǐːʒitɕ]) is a Croatian surname. Notable people with the surname include:

- Danijel Nizic (born 1995), Australian footballer
- Zoran Nižić (born 1989), Croatian footballer
