= 2015–16 Burnley F.C. season =

English football club season

Burnley
2015–16 season
- Chairman: Mike Garlick
- Manager: Sean Dyche
- Stadium: Turf Moor
- Championship: 1st (promoted)
- FA Cup: Fourth round
- League Cup: First round
- Top goalscorer: League: Andre Gray (23); All: Andre Gray (23)
- Highest home attendance: 20,478 (v Blackburn Rovers, Championship, 5 March 2016)
- Lowest home attendance: 14,928 (v Brentford, Championship, 22 August 2015)
- Average home league attendance: 16,823
Home colours	Away colours

The 2015–16 season was Burnley's first season back in the Football League Championship following their relegation from the Premier League the previous season. This season marked their 134th year in existence. Along with the Championship, the club also competed in the FA Cup and Football League Cup. The season covers the period from 1 July 2015 to 30 June 2016. On 2 May 2016, Burnley won promotion back to the Premier League, following a victory over Queens Park Rangers.

== Match details ==
=== Football League Championship ===
==== League table ====
Pos	Team	Pld	W	D	L	GF	GA	GD	Pts	Promotion, qualification or relegation
1	Burnley (C, P)	46	26	15	5	72	35	+37	93	Promotion to the Premier League
2	Middlesbrough (P)	46	26	11	9	63	31	+32	89	Promotion to the Premier League
3	Brighton & Hove Albion	46	24	17	5	72	42	+30	89	Qualification for the Championship play-offs (Note: Four teams play for one spot and promotion to the Premier League.)
4	Hull City (O, P)	46	24	11	11	69	35	+34	83	Qualification for the Championship play-offs
5	Derby County	46	21	15	10	66	43	+23	78	Qualification for the Championship play-offs

Source: BBC Sport
Rules for classification: 1) Points; 2) Goal difference; 3) Number of goals scored
(C) Champions; (O) Play-off winners; (P) Promoted

==== Matches ====
Football League Championship match details
Date	League position	Opponents	Venue	Result	Score F–A	Scorers	Attendance	Ref
8 August 2015	10th	Leeds United	A	D	1–1	Vokes 86'	27,672	
15 August 2015	13th	Birmingham City	H	D	2–2	Keane 51', Taylor 81'	15,061	
18 August 2015	17th	Ipswich Town	A	L	0–2		18,353	
22 August 2015	13th	Brentford	H	W	1–0	Keane 26'	14,928	
29 August 2015	9th	Bristol City	A	W	2–1	Mee 34', Keane 40'	15,002	
12 September 2015	5th	Sheffield Wednesday	H	W	3–1	Jones 7', Taylor 78', Gray 90'	17,277	
15 September 2015	3rd	Milton Keynes Dons	H	W	2–1	Vokes 32', Boyd 49'	15,845	
21 September 2015	3rd	Derby County	A	D	0–0		26,834	
26 September 2015	6th	Reading	H	L	1–2	Darikwa 67'	15,226	
2 October 2015	3rd	Rotherham United	A	W	2–1	Gray 9, Vokes 81'	9,752	
17 October 2015	5th	Bolton Wanderers	H	W	2–0	Gray (2) 56', 68'	17,632	
20 October 2015	5th	Nottingham Forest	A	D	1–1	Taylor 90'	17,721	
24 October 2015	3rd	Blackburn Rovers	A	W	1–0	Arfield 63'	19,897	
31 October 2015	3rd	Huddersfield Town	H	W	2–1	Gray (2) 12' pen., 43'	16,749	
3 November 2015	2nd	Fulham	H	W	3–1	Gray (2) 18', 37', Taylor 90+1'	15,080	
7 November 2015	3rd	Wolverhampton Wanderers	A	D	0–0		20,684	
22 November 2015	5th	Brighton & Hove Albion	H	D	1–1	Gray 4' pen.	15,622	
28 November 2015	5th	Cardiff City	A	D	2–2	Hennings 85', Connolly 90+3' o.g.	15,133	
5 December 2015	5th	Preston North End	H	L	0–2		18,614	
12 December 2015	5th	Queens Park Rangers	A	D	0–0		16,576	
15 December 2015	5th	Middlesbrough	A	L	0–1		19,966	
19 December 2015	5th	Charlton Athletic	H	W	4–0	Arfield (2) 44', 53', Gray 55', Vokes 78'	15,697	
26 December 2015	5th	Hull City	A	L	0–3		21,842	
28 December 2015	5th	Bristol City	H	W	4–0	Gray (3) 37', 45+2', 78', Arfield 71'	17,234	
2 January 2016	5th	Ipswich Town	H	D	0–0		16,307	
12 January 2016	4th	Milton Keynes Dons	A	W	5–0	Barton 14', Vokes 46', Gray 64', Lowton 71', Boyd 82'	10,011	
15 January 2016	4th	Brentford	A	W	3–1	Arfield 12', Barton 30', Boyd 39'	10,039	
25 January 2016	3rd	Derby County	H	W	4–1	Keogh 29' o.g., Gray 54' pen., Vokes 58' pen., Arfield 66'	15,214	
2 February 2016	3rd	Sheffield Wednesday	A	D	1–1	Gray 3'	19,762	
6 February 2016	3rd	Hull City	H	W	1–0	Vokes 77'	17,667	
13 February 2016	3rd	Reading	A	D	0–0		16,773	
20 February 2016	2nd	Rotherham United	H	W	2–0	Vokes 27' pen., Arfield 86'	15,849	
23 February 2016	2nd	Nottingham Forest	H	W	1–0	Vokes 68'	15,517	
27 February 2016	1st	Bolton Wanderers	A	W	2–1	Gray (2) 74', 85'	17,484	
5 March 2016	1st	Blackburn Rovers	H	W	1–0	Gray 16' pen.	20,478	
8 March 2016	1st	Fulham	A	W	3–2	Vokes (2) 9', 49' pen., Gray 61'	15,281	
12 March 2016	1st	Huddersfield Town	A	W	3–1	Ward 14', Vokes 30', Mee 45+2'	13,917	
19 March 2016	1st	Wolverhampton Wanderers	H	D	1–1	Vokes 68'	17,411	
2 April 2016	1st	Brighton & Hove Albion	A	D	2–2	Gray 33', Keane 90+3'	29,683	
5 April 2016	1st	Cardiff City	H	D	0–0		15,740	
9 April 2016	1st	Leeds United	H	W	1–0	Arfield 1'	18,229	
16 April 2016	2nd	Birmingham City	A	W	2–1	Boyd 31', Gray 77'	19,151	
19 April 2016	2nd	Middlesbrough	H	D	1–1	Keane 90+2'	20,197	
22 April 2016	1st	Preston North End	A	W	1–0	Barton 6'	17,789	
2 May 2016	1st	Queens Park Rangers	H	W	1–0	Vokes 61'	19,362	
7 May 2016	1st	Charlton Athletic	A	W	3–0	Vokes 20', Boyd 49', Gray 51'	16,199	

=== FA Cup ===
FA Cup match details
Round	Date	Opponents	Venue	Result	Score F–A	Scorers	Attendance	Ref
Third round	9 January 2016	Middlesbrough	A	W	2–1	Hennings 45+1', Ward 71'	18,286	
Fourth round	30 January 2016	Arsenal	A	L	1–2	Vokes 30'	59,932	

=== Football League Cup ===
Football League Cup match details
Round	Date	Opponents	Venue	Result	Score F–A	Scorers	Attendance	Ref
First round	11 August 2015	Port Vale	A	L	0–1		4,634	

== Transfers ==
=== In ===
Date	Player	Club†	Fee	Ref
22 June 2015	Matthew Lowton	Aston Villa	Undisclosed	
7 July 2015	Jelle Vossen	Genk	Undisclosed	
28 July 2015	Chris Long	Everton	Undisclosed	
29 July 2015	Dan Agyei	AFC Wimbledon	Undisclosed	
30 July 2015	Tendayi Darikwa	Chesterfield	Undisclosed	
6 August 2015	Luke Hendrie	(Derby County)	Free	
7 August 2015	Renny Smith	(Arsenal)	Free	
10 August 2015	Josh Ginnelly	Shrewsbury Town	Undisclosed	
14 August 2015	Rouwen Hennings	Karlsruhe	Undisclosed	
21 August 2015	Andre Gray	Brentford	Undisclosed	
27 August 2015	Joey Barton	(Queens Park Rangers)	Free	
24 September 2015	Arlen Birch	(Everton)	Free	
22 January 2016	George Green	(Ossett Albion)	Free	
26 January 2016	Paul Robinson	(Blackburn Rovers)	Free	
1 February 2016	James Tarkowski	Brentford	Undisclosed	
15 February 2016	Lloyd Dyer	(Watford)	Free	
11 March 2016	Freddy Yao	(Stoke City)	Free	
15 March 2016	Taofiq Olomowewe		Free	

† Brackets around club names denote the player's contract with that club had expired before he joined Burnley.

=== Out ===
Date	Player	Club†	Fee	Ref
18 May 2015	Steven Reid		Retired	
8 June 2015	Danny Ings	Liverpool	Tribunal	
19 June 2015	Kieran Trippier	Tottenham Hotspur	Undisclosed	
1 July 2015	Ross Wallace	(Sheffield Wednesday)	Released	
1 July 2015	Cameron Howieson	(St Mirren)	Released	
1 July 2015	Luke Daly		Released	
1 July 2015	Kevin Ly		Released	
1 July 2015	Evan Galvin	(Waterford United)	Released	
23 July 2015	Jason Shackell	Derby County	Undisclosed	
27 July 2015	Alex Cisak	Leyton Orient	Undisclosed	
31 August 2015	Jelle Vossen	Club Brugge	Undisclosed	
1 September 2015	Luke O'Neill	(Southend United)	Released	
1 September 2015	Marvin Sordell	(Colchester United)	Released	
16 December 2015	Steven Hewitt	(Chester)	Released	
24 March 2016	Jamie Frost		Released	
24 March 2016	Nathan Lowe	(FC United of Manchester)	Released	

† Brackets around club names denote the player joined that club after his Burnley contract expired.

=== Loan out ===
Date	Player	Club	Return	Ref
23 July 2015	Luke Conlan	St Mirren	5 January 2016	
11 August 2015	Conor Mitchell	Sheffield	8 September 2015	
22 August 2015	Luke O'Neill	Southend United	1 September 2015	
1 October 2015	Danijel Nizic	Crewe Alexandra	1 January 2016	
2 October 2015	Cameron Dummigan	Oldham Athletic	End of season	
2 October 2015	Daniel Lafferty	Oldham Athletic	2 November 2015	
14 October 2015	Luke Hendrie	Hartlepool United	14 November 2015	
19 November 2015	Kevin Long	Barnsley	19 February 2016	
24 November 2015	Alex Whitmore	Chester	28 December 2015	
2 January 2016	Alex Whitmore	Gateshead	End of season	
7 January 2016	Daniel Lafferty	Oldham Athletic	5 March 2016	
7 January 2016	Luke Hendrie	York City	End of season	
7 January 2016	Conor Mitchell	Bradford Park Avenue	7 February 2016	
8 January 2016	Josh Ginnelly	Altrincham	30 April 2016	
8 January 2016	Jason Gilchrist	Chester	8 February 2016	
12 January 2016	Ntumba Massanka	York City	11 March 2016	
15 January 2016	Luke Conlan	Morecambe	End of season	
1 February 2016	Tom Anderson	Chesterfield	End of season	
16 February 2016	Conor Mitchell	Sheffield	16 March 2016	
29 February 2016	Renny Smith	GAIS	End of season	
24 March 2016	Brandon Wilson	Stockport County	End of season	
24 March 2016	Kevin Long	Milton Keynes Dons	End of season	

== Appearances and goals ==
Numbers in parentheses denote appearances as substitute.
Players with names marked † left the club during the playing season.
Players with names in italics and marked * were on loan from another club for the whole of their season with Burnley.
Players listed with no appearances have been in the matchday squad but only as unused substitutes.
Key to positions: GK – Goalkeeper; DF – Defender; MF – Midfielder; FW – Forward

Players contracted for the 2015–16 season
No.	Pos.	Nat.	Name	League		FA Cup		League Cup		Total		Discipline	
No.	Pos.	Nat.	Name	Apps	Goals	Apps	Goals	Apps	Goals	Apps	Goals	A yellow rectangle, denoting the yellow penalty card shown to a player being cautioned	A red rectangle, denoting the red penalty card shown to a player being sent off
1	GK	ENG	Tom Heaton (c)	46	0	2	0	0	0	48	0	0	0
2	DF	ENG	Matthew Lowton	25 (2)	1	0	0	0	0	25 (2)	1	4	0
3	DF	NIR	Daniel Lafferty	0	0	0	0	0	0	0	0	0	0
4	DF	NIR	Michael Duff	23 (1)	0	0	0	1	0	24 (1)	0	2	0
5	DF	ENG	Michael Keane	44	5	2	0	0	0	46	5	3	0
6	DF	ENG	Ben Mee	46	2	2	0	1	0	49	2	8	0
7	FW	ENG	Andre Gray	41	23	1	0	0	0	42	23	2	0
8	MF	ENG	Dean Marney	7 (5)	0	0	0	0	0	7 (5)	0	3	0
9	FW	WAL	Sam Vokes	39 (4)	15	2	1	1	0	42 (4)	16	1	0
10	FW	BEL	Jelle Vossen †	3 (1)	0	0	0	1	0	4 (1)	0	1	0
11	MF	ENG	Michael Kightly	12 (6)	0	1 (1)	0	1	0	14 (7)	0	2	0
13	MF	ENG	Joey Barton	37 (1)	3	0 (2)	0	0	0	37 (3)	3	10	0
14	MF	ENG	David Jones	39 (2)	1	2	0	0	0	41 (2)	1	2	0
15	MF	ENG	Matthew Taylor	1 (26)	4	0	0	1	0	2 (26)	4	1	0
16	DF	ENG	Luke O'Neill †	0	0	0	0	0	0	0	0	0	0
16	MF	ENG	Lloyd Dyer	0 (3)	0	0	0	0	0	0 (3)	0	0	0
17	FW	ENG	Marvin Sordell †	0 (3)	0	0	0	0 (1)	0	0 (4)	0	0	0
17	GK	ENG	Paul Robinson	0	0	0	0	0	0	0	0	0	0
18	FW	GER	Rouwen Hennings	3 (23)	1	1 (1)	1	0	0	4 (24)	2	0	0
19	FW	ENG	Lukas Jutkiewicz	3 (2)	0	0	0	0 (1)	0	3 (3)	0	0	0
20	MF	NOR	Fredrik Ulvestad	1 (4)	0	2	0	0	0	3 (4)	0	1	0
21	MF	SCO	George Boyd	42 (2)	5	2	0	1	0	45 (2)	5	2	0
22	GK	SCO	Matt Gilks	0	0	0	0	1	0	1	0	0	0
23	DF	IRL	Stephen Ward	23 (1)	1	2	1	1	0	26 (1)	2	2	0
24	FW	ENG	Chris Long	1 (9)	0	0 (1)	0	0	0	1 (10)	0	1	0
26	DF	ENG	James Tarkowski	2 (2)	0	0	0	0	0	2 (2)	0	0	0
27	DF	ZIM	Tendayi Darikwa	21	1	2	0	1	0	24	1	2	0
28	DF	IRL	Kevin Long	0	0	0	0	0	0	0	0	0	0
29	DF	NIR	Luke Conlan	0	0	0	0	0	0	0	0	0	0
30	FW	ENG	Ashley Barnes	1 (7)	0	0	0	0	0	1 (7)	0	1	0
32	FW	ENG	Dan Agyei	0	0	0	0	0	0	0	0	0	0
33	MF	ENG	Steven Hewitt †	0	0	0	0	0	0	0	0	0	0
34	DF	ENG	Tom Anderson	0	0	0	0	0	0	0	0	0	0
35	DF	ENG	Alex Whitmore	0	0	0	0	0	0	0	0	0	0
36	GK	NIR	Conor Mitchell	0	0	0	0	0	0	0	0	0	0
37	MF	CAN	Scott Arfield	46	8	1 (1)	0	1	0	48 (1)	8	6	0
38	DF	NIR	Cameron Dummigan	0	0	0	0	0	0	0	0	0	0
39	FW	SCO	Jamie Frost †	0	0	0	0	0	0	0	0	0	0
40	GK	AUS	Danijel Nizic	0	0	0	0	0	0	0	0	0	0
41	MF	AUS	Aiden O'Neill	0	0	0	0	0	0	0	0	0	0
42	DF	ENG	Christian Hill	0	0	0	0	0	0	0	0	0	0
43	MF	ENG	Brad Jackson	0	0	0	0	0	0	0	0	0	0
44	FW	ENG	Jason Gilchrist	0	0	0	0	0	0	0	0	0	0
45	MF	ENG	Nathan Lowe †	0	0	0	0	0	0	0	0	0	0
46	FW	ENG	Ntumba Massanka	0	0	0	0	0	0	0	0	0	0
47	MF	AUS	Brandon Wilson	0	0	0	0	0	0	0	0	0	0

== See also ==
- List of Burnley F.C. seasons
