= Josh Ginnelly =

English footballer

Personal information
- Full name: Joshua Lloyd Ginnelly
- Date of birth: 24 March 1997 (age 29)
- Place of birth: Nuneaton, England
- Height: 5 ft 8 in (1.73 m)
- Positions: Right winger; forward

Youth career
- –2013: Aston Villa
- 2013–2014: Shrewsbury Town

Senior career*
Years	Team	Apps	(Gls)
2014–2015	Shrewsbury Town	3	(0)
2015–2018	Burnley	0	(0)
2016	→ Altrincham (loan)	20	(5)
2016–2017	→ Walsall (loan)	9	(0)
2017	→ Lincoln City (loan)	13	(0)
2017–2018	→ Lincoln City (loan)	15	(2)
2018	→ Tranmere Rovers (loan)	10	(1)
2018–2019	Walsall	21	(2)
2019–2021	Preston North End	6	(0)
2020	→ Bristol Rovers (loan)	9	(1)
2020–2021	→ Heart of Midlothian (loan)	6	(3)
2021–2023	Heart of Midlothian	61	(17)
2023–2025	Swansea City	9	(1)
2026	Turan Tovuz	8	(0)
- * Club domestic league appearances and goals as of 10:38, 26 May 2026 (UTC)

Joshua Lloyd Ginnelly (born 24 March 1997) is an English professional footballer who plays as a right winger or forward. He is currently a free agent.

Primarily a left winger, Ginnelly began his career in the Aston Villa youth system before later joining Shrewsbury Town, Burnley, Walsall, and Heart of Midlothian as well as spending a number of years on loan at different clubs, including Altrincham, Lincoln City, Tranmere Rovers, and Bristol Rovers.

== Club career ==
=== Shrewsbury Town ===
Born in Nuneaton, England, Ginnelly began his career at Aston Villa, where he spent seven years. Following his release from the Aston Villa youth system, Ginnelly began a two-year scholarship with Shrewsbury Town in 2013.

At the start of his Shrewsbury Town career, Ginnelly was immediately assigned to the club's youth team. He quickly impressed for the youth side, and subsequently was called up to the first team by manager Michael Jackson. Ginnelly appeared as an unused substitute in the last game of the season, in a 1–1 draw against Gillingham.

Ginnelly made his Football League debut under manager Micky Mellon on 30 August 2014, coming on as a late substitute for James Collins in a 2–0 win over Luton Town at the New Meadow. After the match, he said making his professional debut was a "dream come true". Local newspaper, Shropshire Star, praised Ginnelly's performance for his technical ability, quoting: "bringing down a long ball with his first touch before showing ambition by taking on two Luton defenders." However, Ginnelly only appeared two more times later in the 2014–15 season. He was awarded the club's Youth Player of the Year at the award ceremony.

He was offered his first professional contract in March 2015, but he failed to return to training the following pre-season with his contract situation unresolved.

=== Burnley ===
Ginnelly was reported to be having trials with Norwich City, and Burnley scouted by ex u21 scout Aidy Wilson , and joined the latter for an undisclosed fee on a three-year deal on 10 August 2015.

Ginnelly was released by Burnley following the expiration of his contract after three years at the club, without making a first team appearance for the side.

==== Altrincham (loan) ====
On 8 January 2016, Ginnelly joined National League side Altrincham on an initial one-month loan. He made his debut on 23 January 2016 in a 5–0 win over Grimsby Town, playing the entire game. Ginnelly scored his first goal for the club three days later in a 3–1 win over Woking. He then scored two goals in two matches between 9 February 2016 and 13 February 2016 against Wrexham and Lincoln City respectively. During a match against Barrow on 12 March 2016, Ginnelly was the subject of racist abuse by opposition fans, prompting a police investigation. Despite this, he had his loan spell at the club extended until the end of the season, having previously extended the previous month. Ginnelly scored two more goals later in the season as he went on to make twenty appearances and scored five times in all competitions – Altrincham were however still relegated from the division.

==== Walsall (loan) ====
On 28 July 2016, Ginnelly signed for EFL League One side Walsall on loan until January 2017. He made his Walsall debut on 30 August 2016, a 72nd-minute substitute, in a 5–2 win over Grimsby Town in the Football League Trophy. He spent much of the start of the season on the bench, finally making his league debut on 15 October 2016 in a 3–2 victory over his former club Shrewsbury. His performance earned him a run of games for the club, however he returned to Burnley in January 2017 having failed to make an appearance since November.

==== Lincoln City (loan) ====
On 30 January 2017, Ginnelly signed for National League leaders Lincoln City on loan until the end of the season. He made his Lincoln City debut, playing the whole game (and played a role that led to Terell Thomas scoring an own goal), in a 3–2 win over Woking on 11 February 2017. He made a total of seventeen appearances in all competitions as Lincoln finished as champions.

On 26 June 2017, Ginnelly re-joined Lincoln City on a season long loan for the 2017–18 season. Ginnelly scored his first goal for Lincoln on the first day of the following season in a 2–2 draw with Wycombe Wanderers on 5 August 2017. After suffering ankle injury that kept him out throughout August, he returned from injury on 9 September 2017, where he came on as a substitute, in a 2–1 win over Stevenage. It wasn't until 7 November 2017 when he scored again in a 2–1 win over Notts County in the Football League Trophy. A month later, on 26 December 2017, Ginnelly scored his third goal of the season, in a 3–0 win over Stevenage. However, he appeared in and out of the starting eleven, and faced competition from other players, including loanee signing Danny Rowe. As a result, he was recalled by Burnley, making nineteen total appearances and scoring three times in his second loan spell at Lincoln City.

==== Tranmere Rovers (loan) ====
On 12 January 2018, he signed a loan deal with Tranmere Rovers until the end of the season. Ginnelly scored on his Tranmere Rovers debut eight days after joining the club, in a 3–2 win over Maidenhead United. Despite losing his first team place between late–March and mid–April, he returned to the starting lineup on 21 April 2018, in a 2–0 win over FC Halifax Town. In the play-off semi-final, Ginnelly scored in a 4–2 win over Ebbsfleet. Ginnelly started the National League play-off final, helping the side beat Boreham Wood 2–1 at Wembley and ensuring the club's return to the EFL after a three-year absence. He was substituted due to injury after 34 minutes He went on to make 12 appearances and scoring two times for the side.

=== Walsall ===
After being released by Burnley at the end of the 2017–18 season, it was announced on 5 June 2018 that Ginnelly signed a one–year contract at former loan club Walsall. Upon joining the club, he revealed that Manager Dean Keates convinced him to re-join Walsall, citing his style of management.

Ginnelly's first game after re-signing for the club came in the opening game of the season, where he started the match and played 84 minutes, in a 2–1 win over Plymouth Argyle. It wasn't until 14 August 2018 when he scored his first goal for the club, in a 3–1 win over Tranmere Rovers in the first round of the League Cup. A week later, on 25 August 2018, Ginnelly scored again, in a 3–1 win over Rochdale. Ginnelly quickly became a first team regular, playing in an attacking role, and formed a partnership with Luke Leahy.

=== Preston North End ===
On 1 January 2019, he signed a two-and-a-half-year contract with Preston North End for an undisclosed fee, keeping him at the club until the end of the 2020–21 season.

==== Bristol Rovers (loan) ====
Ginnelly joined League One club Bristol Rovers on a six-month loan deal on 16 January 2020.

==== Heart of Midlothian (loan) ====
On 2 September 2020, Ginnelly signed for then Scottish Championship club Heart of Midlothian on a season-long loan.

=== Heart of Midlothian ===
In June 2021, Ginnelly signed a two-year contract with newly-promoted Hearts after being released by previous club Preston.

=== Swansea City ===
In July 2023 Ginnelly signed for Swansea City. He scored on his debut for the club in a 3–0 win over Northampton Town in the EFL Cup on 8 August 2023. After just eight appearances and two goals for the club, Ginnelly suffered an achilles tendon rupture on 23 September 2023, in the first half of a 3–0 win over Sheffield Wednesday. He spent over 15 months out with injury, returning as a late substitute in January 2025, in an FA Cup third round defeat against Southampton. His career at the club never recovered, making only three more appearances during that season. His contract was terminated by mutual consent on 2 September 2025, having made 12 appearances and scored two goals in all competitions during his two years at the club.

=== Turan Tovuz ===
On 24 January 2026, Ginnelly joined Azerbaijan Premier League side Turan Tovuz on a two-and-a-half year deal. He later departed the club in July 2026.

== Career statistics ==
As of 27 May 2023

Appearances and goals by club, season and competition
Club	Season	League			National Cup		League Cup		Other		Total	
Club	Season	Division	Apps	Goals	Apps	Goals	Apps	Goals	Apps	Goals	Apps	Goals
Shrewsbury Town	2013–14	League One	0	0	0	0	0	0	0	0	0	0
Shrewsbury Town	2014–15	League Two	3	0	0	0	0	0	0	0	3	0
Shrewsbury Town	Total		3	0	0	0	0	0	0	0	3	0
Burnley	2015–16	Championship	0	0	0	0	0	0	—		0	0
Burnley	2016–17	Premier League	0	0	—		—		—		0	0
Burnley	2017–18	Premier League	0	0	—		—		—		0	0
Burnley	Total		0	0	0	0	0	0	—		0	0
Altrincham (loan)	2015–16	National League	20	5	—		—		1 (Note: Appearance in FA Trophy)	0	21	5
Walsall (loan)	2016–17	League One	9	0	1	0	1	0	3 (Note: Appearances in EFL Trophy)	0	14	0
Lincoln City (loan)	2016–17	National League	13	0	—		—		4	0	17	0
Lincoln City (loan)	2017–18	League Two	15	2	1	0	0	0	3	1	19	3
Lincoln City (loan)	Total		28	2	1	0	0	0	7	1	36	3
Tranmere Rovers (loan)	2017–18	National League	10	1	—		—		2 (Note: Appearances in National League play-offs)	1	12	2
Walsall	2018–19	League One	21	2	3	1	1	1	0	0	22	4
Preston North End	2018–19	Championship	5	1	—		—		—		5	1
Preston North End	2019–20	Championship	1	0	0	0	3	0	—		4	0
Preston North End	2020–21	Championship	0	0	0	0	0	0	—		0	0
Preston North End	Total		6	1	0	0	3	0	—		9	1
Bristol Rovers (loan)	2019–20	League One	9	1	—		—		—		9	1
Heart of Midlothian (loan)	2020–21	Scottish Championship	6	3	1 (Note: Includes appearance in the final of the 2019–20 Scottish Cup which was delayed to December 2020 because of COVID-19.)	1	3	0	—		10	4
Heart of Midlothian	2021–22	Scottish Premiership	31	5	2	0	5	0	—		38	5
Heart of Midlothian	2022–23	Scottish Premiership	30	12	3	1	1	0	7	0	41	13
Heart of Midlothian	Total		67	20	6	2	9	0	7	0	89	22
Career total			170	31	11	3	13	1	20	2	214	37

== Honours ==
Lincoln City

- National League: 2016–17

Tranmere Rovers

- National League play-offs: 2018

Hearts

- Scottish Championship: 2020–21
- Scottish Cup: runner-up 2019–20
