= 2016–17 Morecambe F.C. season =

Morecambe F.C.
2016–17 season
- Chairman: Peter McGuigan
- Manager: Jim Bentley
- Stadium: Globe Arena
- League Two: 18th
- FA Cup: First round
- EFL Cup: Second round
- EFL Trophy: Second round
Home colours	Away colours

The 2016–17 season was Morecambe's tenth consecutive season in League Two, the fourth tier of English football. They finished 18th in League Two, and also competed in the FA Cup, EFL Cup and EFL Trophy. They were eliminated in the first round in the FA Cup and the second round in the latter two.

The season page covers the period between 1 July 2016 and 30 June 2017.

== Competitions ==
=== Pre-season friendlies ===
12 July 2016 Friendly	Bamber Bridge	0–3	Morecambe	Bamber Bridge
19:30		Report	Stockton x2 Kenyon	Stadium: Sir Tom Finney Stadium

16 July 2016 Friendly	Morecambe	0–0	Blackburn Rovers	Morecambe
14:30		Report		Stadium: Globe Arena

16 July 2016 Friendly	Morecambe	4–0	Bury	Morecambe
16:00	Ellison; Trialist; Trialist; Barkhuizen	Report		Stadium: Globe Arena

19 July 2016 Friendly	Morecambe	1–1	Burnley	Morecambe
19:30	Turner 55'	Report	Gray 66'	Stadium: Globe Arena

23 July 2016 Friendly	FC Halifax Town	6–2	Morecambe	Halifax
15:00	Kosylo 46'; Macdonald 54'; Garner 59'; Denton 69'; Peniket 83', 88'	Report	Mullin 7', 55'	Stadium: The Shay; Attendance: 635 (45 away); Referee: Jane Simms

26 July 2016 Friendly	Morecambe	1–4	Preston North End	Morecambe
19:30	Barkhuizen 78'		Robinson 23', 81'; Pringle 39'; Hugill 71'	Stadium: Globe Arena

=== League Two ===
==== League table ====
Pos	Team	Pld	W	D	L	GF	GA	GD	Pts
16	Notts County	46	16	8	22	54	76	−22	56
17	Crewe Alexandra	46	14	13	19	58	67	−9	55
18	Morecambe	46	14	10	22	53	73	−20	52
19	Crawley Town	46	13	12	21	53	71	−18	51
20	Yeovil Town	46	11	17	18	49	64	−15	50

Updated to match(es) played on 6 May 2017. Source: BBC Sport
Rules for classification: 1) Points; 2) Goal difference; 3) Number of goals scored

==== Matches ====
6 August 2016 1	Grimsby Town	2–0	Morecambe	Cleethorpes
15:00 BST	Jackson 6'; Bolarinwa (yellow card) 43'; Davies 63'; Gowling (red card) 71'; McKeown (yellow card) 81'	Report	Fleming (yellow card) 62'	Stadium: Blundell Park; Attendance: 6,004; Referee: Mark Heywood

13 August 2016 2	Morecambe	2–1	Blackpool	Morecambe
15:00 BST	Wakefield (yellow card) 41'; Dunn 45+3' (pen.); Rose (yellow card) 70' (goal) 76'		Taylor (yellow card) 4'; Potts 23'; Robertson (yellow card) 59'	Stadium: Globe Arena; Attendance: 3,676

16 August 2016 3	Morecambe	2–0	Portsmouth	Morecambe
19:45 BST	Edwards 10'; Barkhuizen 21'; Stockton (yellow card) 65'; Fleming (yellow card) 79'; Molyneux (yellow card) 90+3'	Report	Doyle (yellow card) 67'; Stevens (yellow card) 90+1'	Stadium: Globe Arena; Attendance: 1,838; Referee: Nigel Miller

20 August 2016 4	Yeovil Town	0–1	Morecambe	Yeovil
15:00 BST	Dawson (yellow card) 40'	Report	Ellison 55'; Fleming (yellow card) 79'	Stadium: Huish Park; Attendance: 2,937; Referee: John Busby

27 August 2016 5	Accrington Stanley	2–3	Morecambe	Accrington
15:00 BST	Kee 27', 34'; Hughes (red card) 36'; Conneely (yellow card) 37'; Parish (yellow card) 45+2'; O'Sullivan (yellow card) 49'	Report	Stockton 45+1', 57' (yellow card) 54'; Ellison 46' (yellow card) 76'; Rose (yellow card) 83'; Edwards (yellow card) 90+2'	Stadium: Crown Ground; Attendance: 1,763; Referee: Mike Jones

3 September 2016 6	Morecambe	1–2	Leyton Orient	Morecambe
15:00 BST	Ellison 49' (yellow card) 90'; Rose (yellow card) 67'	Report	Kelly 27'; Bowery 55' (yellow card) 90'	Stadium: Globe Arena; Attendance: 1,665; Referee: John Brooks

10 September 2016 7	Morecambe	1–5	Doncaster Rovers	Morecambe
15:00 BST	Kenyon (yellow card) 27'; Stockton 45'; Barkhuizen (yellow card) 51'; Rose (yellow card) 63'; Whitmore (red card) 84'	Report	Butler 4'; Marquis 17', 66' (yellow card) 49'; Blair 74'; Coppinger 80'	Stadium: Globe Arena; Attendance: 1,791; Referee: Ollie Yates

17 September 2016 8	Cambridge United	1–2	Morecambe	Cambridge
15:00 BST	Mingoia 36'; Williamson (yellow card) 53'	Report	Dunn 62' (pen.); Mullin 64'; Winnard (yellow card) 79'	Stadium: The R Costings Abbey Stadium; Referee: Darren England

24 September 2016 9	Morecambe	2–3	Crawley Town	Morecambe
15:00 BST	Barkhuizen (yellow card) 49'; Rose 89'; Stockton 90+3'	Report	Yussuf 72'; Collins 83'; McNerney (yellow card) 88'; Smith 90+1'	Stadium: Globe Arena; Attendance: 1,304; Referee: Chris Sarginson

27 September 2016 10	Barnet	2–2	Morecambe	Canons Park, London
20:00 BST	Akinde 7', 31'	Report	Barkhuizen 9'; Stockton 81'	Stadium: The Hive Stadium; Attendance: 1,164; Referee: Gavin Ward

8 October 2016 11	Morecambe	0–3	Carlisle United	Morecambe
15:00 BST	Fleming (yellow card) 48'; Ellison (yellow card) 55'	Report	Grainger 15'; Kennedy 72', 78'; Miller (yellow card) 90+3'	Stadium: Globe Arena; Attendance: 3,773; Referee: Kevin Friend

11 October 2016 12	Notts County	1–2	Morecambe	Nottingham
19:45 BST	Dickinson (yellow card) 33'; Forte (yellow card) 74'; Oliver 90+3'	Report	Barkhuizen 16', 55' (pen.); Edwards (yellow card) 85'	Stadium: Meadow Lane Stadium; Attendance: 3,507; Referee: Dean Whitestone

15 October 2016 13	Morecambe	0–2	Stevenage	Morecambe
15:00 BST	Whitmore (yellow card) 61'; Mullin (penalty missed) 88'; Murphy (yellow card) 90+5'	Report	Godden 36'; Cowans (yellow card) 43'; Kennedy 57'; Henry (yellow card) 88'	Stadium: Globe Arena; Attendance: 1,212; Referee: Richard Clark

22 October 2016 14	Colchester United	2–2	Morecambe	Colchester
15:00 BST	Porter 4', 39' (pen.); Wright (yellow card) 49'	Report	Barkhuizen (penalty missed) 17' 27'; Ellison (yellow card) 38'; Fleming (yellow card) 56'; Rose (yellow card) 62'; Edwards (yellow card) 72'; Molyneux 77'	Stadium: Weston Homes Community Stadium; Attendance: 2,815; Referee: Gavin Ward

29 October 2016 15	Morecambe	0–3	Exeter City	Morecambe
15:00 BST	Edwards (yellow card) 35'; Barkhuizen (yellow card) 42'	Report	Wheeler 4'; Grant 16'; Holmes 35'; James (yellow card) 56'; Croll (yellow card) 79'	Stadium: Globe Arena; Attendance: 1,302; Referee: Ben Toner

12 November 2016 16	Wycombe Wanderers	2–0	Morecambe	High Wycombe
15:00 GMT	Pierre (yellow card) 34' (goal) 47'; Jacobson (yellow card) 72'; O'Nien 81'	Report	Jennings (yellow card) 8'; Winnard (yellow card) 25'; Rose (yellow card) 45+3'; Mullin (yellow card) 56'	Stadium: Adams Park; Attendance: 3,019; Referee: Darren Handley

19 November 2016 17	Morecambe	0–2	Luton Town	Morecambe
15:00 GMT	Rose (yellow card) 72'; Whitmore (red card) 85'	Report	Hylton 26' (yellow card) 90+4'; Vassell 60'; Smith (yellow card) 89'	Stadium: Globe Arena; Attendance: 1,507; Referee: Ben Toner

22 November 2016 18	Crewe Alexandra	2–1	Morecambe	Crewe
19:45 GMT	Kiwomya 19'; Jones 42'	Report	Turner 8'; Edwards (yellow card) 70'; Wakefield (yellow card) 83'	Stadium: Alexandra Stadium; Attendance: 2,844; Referee: Trevor Kettle

26 November 2016 19	Morecambe	2–1	Plymouth Argyle	Morecambe
15:00 GMT	Rose 20' (pen.) (yellow card) 22'; Ellison (yellow card) 26'; Murphy 63'; Wakefield (yellow card) 83'	Report	Donaldson (yellow card) 24'; Slew (yellow card) 25' (yellow-red card) 47'; Threlkeld 44'	Stadium: Globe Arena; Attendance: 1,435; Referee: Darren England

17 December 2016 20	Morecambe	1–2	Cheltenham Town	Morecambe
15:00 GMT	Murphy 6'; Kenyon (red card) 39'; Mullin (yellow card) 53'	Report	Cranston (yellow card) 53'; Waters 70'; Pell 71'	Stadium: Globe Arena; Attendance: 1,297; Referee: Michael Salisbury

26 December 2016 21	Mansfield Town	0–1	Morecambe	Mansfield
15:00 GMT	Clements (yellow card) 37'	Report	Fleming 13'; Winnard (yellow card) 72'; Murphy (yellow card) 75'; Wildig (yellow card) 88'	Stadium: One Call Stadium; Attendance: 3,237; Referee: Mark Haywood

30 December 2016 22	Hartlepool United	3–2	Morecambe	Hartlepool
19:45 GMT	Amond 10'; Paynter 14' (pen.); Featherstone 24'; Woods (yellow card) 35'; Nsiala (yellow card) 61'	Report	Winnard (yellow card) 26'; Fleming 52'; Edwards 90+5'	Stadium: The Northern Gas and Power Stadium; Attendance: 2,996; Referee: Seb Stockbridge

2 January 2017 23	Morecambe	0–0	Crewe Alexandra	Morecambe
15:00 GMT	Edwards (yellow card) 90+3'	Report		Stadium: Globe Arena; Attendance: 1,722; Referee: Ben Toner

7 January 2017 24	Morecambe	4–1	Notts County	Morecambe
15:00 GMT	Molyneux 2' (yellow card) 17'; Mullin 27'; Rose 31' (pen.); Fleming (red card) 45+1'; Wakefield (yellow card) 84'; Ellison 90+1'	Report	Hewitt (yellow card) 30'; Forte 80'; O'Connor (yellow card) 90+3'	Stadium: Globe Arena; Attendance: 1,315; Referee: Carl Boyeson

14 January 2017 25	Carlisle United	1–1	Morecambe	Carlisle
15:00 GMT	Joyce (yellow card) 18'; Wyke 74'	Report	Wildig 7'; Murphy (yellow card) 32'; Edwards (yellow card) 48'; Winnard (yellow card) 49' (yellow-red card) 73'; Kenyon (yellow card) 67'	Stadium: Brunton Park; Attendance: 5,524; Referee: Ross Joyce

4 February 2017 26	Doncaster Rovers	1–1	Morecambe	Doncaster
15:00 GMT	Butler (yellow card) 51'; Marquis 56'; Mason (yellow card) 66'	Report	Murphy 24'; Edwards (yellow card) 75'	Stadium: Keepmoat Stadium; Attendance: 6,096; Referee: Eddie Ilderton

7 February 2017 27	Leyton Orient	0–1	Morecambe	Leyton, London
19:45 GMT	Semedo (yellow card) 72'; Collins (yellow card) 82'	Report	Mullin 72' (yellow card) 73'; McGowan (yellow card) 83'	Stadium: Brisbane Road; Attendance: 2,660; Referee: John Brooks

11 February 2017 28	Morecambe	2–0	Cambridge United	Morecambe
15:00 GMT	Murphy (yellow card) 9'; Ellison 50', 55'	Report	Berry (yellow card) 43'; Mingoia (yellow card) 90'	Stadium: Globe Arena; Attendance: 2,162; Referee: Nigel Miller

14 February 2017 29	Morecambe	0–1	Barnet	Morecambe
19:45 GMT	Murphy (red card) 27'	Report	Bover (yellow card) 60'; Champion 65'	Stadium: Globe Arena; Attendance: 1,100; Referee: David Coote

18 February 2017 30	Crawley Town	1–3	Morecambe	Crawley
15:00 GMT	Collins 77' (pen.); Lelan (yellow card) 87'; Boldewijn (yellow card) 89'	Report	Turner 3'; Mullin (yellow card) 6' (goal) 7', 40'; Evans (yellow card) 52'; Wakefield (yellow card) 76'	Stadium: Checkatrade.com Stadium; Attendance: 2,091; Referee: Charles Breakspear

21 February 2017 31	Newport County	1–1	Morecambe	Newport
19:45 GMT	Williams 18'; O'Brien (yellow card) 61'	Report	Rose 64'	Stadium: Rodney Parade; Attendance: 1,988; Referee: Brendan Malone

25 February 2017 32	Morecambe	1–0	Grimsby Town	Morecambe
15:00 GMT	Molyneux 2'	Report	Gunning (yellow card) 72'	Stadium: Globe Arena; Attendance: 1,824; Referee: Darren Handley

28 February 2017 33	Portsmouth	1–1	Morecambe	Portsmouth
19:45 GMT	Naismith 64'; Roberts (yellow card) 76'	Report	Molyneux 83'; Rose (yellow card) 90'	Stadium: Fratton Park; Attendance: 15,592; Referee: Stephen Martin

4 March 2017 34	Blackpool	3–1	Morecambe	Blackpool
15:00 GMT	Cullen 14'; Potts 54'; Daniel (yellow card) 63'; Edwards 80' (o.g.)	Report	Murphy (yellow card) 55'; Evans 83'; Roche (yellow card) 88'	Stadium: Bloomfield Road; Attendance: 3,453; Referee: Tony Harrington

11 March 2017 35	Morecambe	1–3	Yeovil Town	Morecambe
15:00 GMT	Evans 53'; Ellison (yellow card) 74'	Report	Butcher 45+2' (yellow card) 84'; Lacey 65'; Mugabi 71'	Stadium: Globe Arena; Attendance: 1,433; Referee: Mark Brown

14 March 2017 36	Morecambe	0–1	Newport County	Morecambe
19:45 GMT		Report	Bird 67' (pen.); O'Brien (yellow card) 77'	Stadium: Globe Arena; Attendance: 1,080; Referee: Peter Bankes

18 March 2017 37	Plymouth Argyle	1–0	Morecambe	Plymouth
15:00 GMT	Carey 17'; Kennedy (yellow card) 67'	Report	Ellison (yellow card) 88'; Whitmore (yellow card) 90+4'	Stadium: Home Park; Attendance: 8,878; Referee: Dean Whitestone

21 March 2017 38	Morecambe	1–2	Accrington Stanley	Morecambe
19:45 GMT	Whitmore (yellow card) 8'; Ellison (yellow card) 45+1'; Conlan (yellow card) 81'; Wildig 82'; Edwards (yellow card) 86'	Report	McCartan 45+1', 66'; Rodgers (yellow card) 81'	Stadium: Globe Arena; Attendance: 1,506; Referee: Oliver Langford

25 March 2017 39	Morecambe	1–3	Mansfield Town	Morecambe
15:00 GMT	Mullin 6'; Duckworth (yellow card) 31'; Winnard (yellow card) 85'	Report	Rose 4', 33' (yellow card) 55'; Whiteman 39'; Benning (yellow card) 62'	Stadium: Globe Arena; Attendance: 1,497; Referee: Robert Jones

1 April 2017 40	Cheltenham Town	3-1	Morecambe	Cheltenham
15:00 GMT		Report		Stadium: Whaddon Road; Attendance: 2,751; Referee: Gavin Ward

8 April 2017 41	Morecambe	1–1	Hartlepool United	Morecambe
15:00 BST	Mullin 59' (yellow card) 61'	Report	Amond 39'	Stadium: Globe Arena; Attendance: 1,548; Referee: Andy Haines

14 April 2017 42	Stevenage	0–1	Morecambe	Stevenage
15:00 BST		Report	Molyneux 68'	Stadium: Broadhall Way; Attendance: 3,117; Referee: Darren Deadman

17 April 2017 43	Morecambe	1–1	Colchester United	Morecambe
15:00 BST	Whitmore (yellow card) 42'; Winnard (yellow card) 68'; Rose 88' (pen.)	Report	Loft (yellow card) 16'; Brindley 22'; Fosu (yellow card) 26'	Stadium: Globe Arena; Attendance: 1,447; Referee: Seb Stockbridge

22 April 2017 44	Exeter City	3–1	Morecambe	Exeter
15:00 BST	Wheeler 47'; Sweeney (yellow card) 82'; Brown (yellow card) 87'; Reid 90+2' (pen.); McAlinden 90+5'	Report	Kenyon (yellow card) 24'; Ellison 61' (yellow card) 61'; Edwards (yellow card) 62'; Mullin (yellow card) 63'; Molyneux (yellow card) 72'	Stadium: St James Park; Attendance: 3,991; Referee: Lee Swabey

29 April 2017 45	Morecambe	1–1	Wycombe Wanderers	Morecambe
15:00 BST	McGowan (yellow card) 62'; Ellison (yellow card) 73' (goal) 81'	Report	Jacobson (yellow card) 49'; Pierre (yellow card) 73'; Akinfenwa 89'	Stadium: Globe Arena; Attendance: 1,742; Referee: Darren Drysdale

6 May 2017 46	Luton Town	3–1	Morecambe	Luton
17:30 BST	Vassell 29'; Potts (yellow card) 44'; Cuthbert (yellow card) 57'; Marriott 74', 86'	Report	Wildig (yellow card) 52'; Rose 58' (pen.)	Stadium: Kenilworth Road; Attendance: 8,399; Referee: John Busby

=== FA Cup ===
6 November 2016 First round	Morecambe	1–1	Coventry City	Morecambe
14:00 GMT	Winnard 59'; Whitmore (yellow card) 77'; Murphy (yellow card) 90'	Report	Sterry 72' (yellow card) 79'; Rúben Lameiras (yellow card) 90+1'	Stadium: Globe Arena; Attendance: 1,732; Referee: Andy Haines

15 November 2016 First round replay	Coventry City	2–1	Morecambe	Coventry
19:45 GMT	Sordell 39', 57'	Report	Winnard 10'; Jennings (yellow card) 86'	Stadium: Ricoh Arena; Attendance: 2,175; Referee: Mark Haywood

=== EFL Cup ===
9 August 2016 First round	Rotherham United	4–5 (a.e.t.)	Morecambe	Rotherham
19:45 BST	Wood (yellow card) 51'; Halford 59' (pen.); Yates 81', 120'; Forde 83'	Report	Stockton 6'; Edwards (yellow card) 59'; Dunn 68', 90+2' (pen.), 118'; Wakefield (yellow card) 77'; Ellison 113'	Stadium: New York Stadium; Attendance: 3,793 (118 away fans); Referee: Seb Stockbridge

24 August 2016 Second round	Morecambe	1–2	AFC Bournemouth	Morecambe
19:45 BST	Stockton 14'		Gradel 8'; Wilson 54'	Stadium: Globe Arena; Attendance: 2,542

=== EFL Trophy ===
Pos	Div	Team	Pld	W	PW	PL	L	GF	GA	GD	Pts	Qualification
1	L1	Bradford City	3	2	0	0	1	5	4	+1	6	Advance to Round 2
2	L2	Morecambe	3	2	0	0	1	7	7	0	6	Advance to Round 2
3	L1	Bury	3	1	0	1	1	6	4	+2	4	
4	ACA	Stoke City U21	3	0	1	0	2	2	5	−3	2	

Source: Sky Sports

30 August 2016 Group stage 1	Bury	4–1	Morecambe	Bury
19:00 BST	Ismail 3' (pen.); Pope 49', 90+1'; Kay (yellow card) 53' (goal) 81'; Soares (yellow card) 83'		Mullin 43' (yellow card) 53'; Wakefield (yellow card) 70'	Stadium: Gigg Lane

4 October 2016 Group stage 2	Morecambe	3–1	Stoke City U23	Morecambe
19:45 BST	Dunn 3' (yellow card) 90+7'; Stockton 21'; Murphy 44' (yellow card) 53'	Report	Edwards (red card) 15'; Adam 48'; Bardsley (yellow card) 90+7'	Stadium: Globe Arena; Attendance: 686; Referee: Andy Haines

9 November 2016 Group stage 3	Morecambe	3–2	Bradford City	Morecambe
19:45 GMT	Fleming (yellow card) 40'; Mullin 54'; Stockton 66', 68'; Edwards (yellow card) 72'	Report	Vučkić 52', 83'; McNulty (yellow card) 78'	Stadium: Globe Arena; Attendance: 827; Referee: Tony Harrington

6 December 2016 Second round	Scunthorpe United	1–1 (5–3 p)	Morecambe	Scunthorpe
19:45 GMT	Mantom 3'	Report	Edwards (yellow card) 35' (goal) 53'	Stadium: Glanford Park; Attendance: 987; Referee: Darren Drysdale
	Penalties
	Morris (penalty scored); Madden (penalty scored) van Veen (penalty scored); Mantom (penalty scored); Williams (penalty scored)		Murphy (penalty missed); Rose (penalty scored); Molyneux (penalty scored); Mullin (penalty scored)

== Transfers ==
=== In ===
Date from	Position	Nationality	Name	From	Fee	Ref.
1 July 2016	LB	NIR	Luke Conlan	Burnley	Free transfer	
1 July 2016	CB	ENG	Liam Wakefield	Accrington Stanley	Free transfer	
1 July 2016	CB	ENG	Dean Winnard	Accrington Stanley	Free transfer	
10 July 2016	CF	ENG	Rhys Turner	Oldham Athletic	Free transfer	
30 July 2016	GK	AUS	Danijel Nizic	Burnley	Free transfer	
1 August 2016	LB	ENG	Michael Rose	Rochdale	Free transfer	

=== Out ===
Date from	Position	Nationality	Name	To	Fee	Ref.
1 July 2016	CM	ENG	Charlie Bailey	Kendal Town	Released	
1 July 2016	RB	ENG	Shaun Beeley	Barrow (Note: Following Shaun Beeley being released, he later signed for Barrow.)	Released	
1 July 2016	LM	ENG	Nathan Bondswell	Free agent	Released	
1 July 2016	RM	IRE	Jamie Devitt	Carlisle United	Free transfer	
1 July 2016	CB	ENG	Chris Doyle	Southport (Note: Following Chris Doyle being released, he later signed for Southport.)	Released	
1 July 2016	CB	ENG	Adam Dugdale	Eastleigh (Note: Following Adam Dugdale being released, he later signed for Eastleigh.)	Released	
1 July 2016	DM	ENG	Alan Goodall	Altrincham	Released	
1 July 2016	CF	ENG	Jack Kelleher	Bradford Park Avenue (Note: Following Jack Kelleher being released, he later signed for Bradford Park Avenue.)	Released	
1 July 2016	MF	NIR	Darren McKnight	Stalybridge Celtic (Note: Following Darren McKnight being released, he later signed for Stalybridge Celtic.)	Released	
1 July 2016	CF	ENG	Shaun Miller	Carlisle United	Free transfer	
1 July 2016	CB	ENG	Andy Parrish	Free agent	Released	
9 August 2016	LB	ENG	Laurence Wilson	Bangor City	Free transfer	
9 November 2016	RW	ENG	Tom Barkhuizen	Preston North End (Note: Following Barkhuizen's departure, he signed a pre-contract agreement on 18 November 2016 to join on 1 January 2017.)	Mutual consent	

=== Loans in ===
Date from	Position	Nationality	Name	From	Date until	Ref.
2 July 2016	CF	ENG	Cole Stockton	Tranmere Rovers	January 2017	
26 July 2016	CB	ENG	Alex Whitmore	Burnley	End of Season	
30 July 2016	CF	ENG	Jack Dunn	Liverpool	January 2017	
31 August 2016	LB	ENG	James Jennings	Cheltenham Town	January 2017	
31 August 2016	CF	ENG	Ntumba Massanka	Burnley	January 2017	
19 January 2017	AM	ENG	Antony Evans	Everton	End of Season	
31 January 2017	RB	ENG	Michael Duckworth	Fleetwood Town	End of Season	

== See also ==
- List of Morecambe F.C. seasons
