= Dan Agyei =

Ghanaian footballer (born 1997)

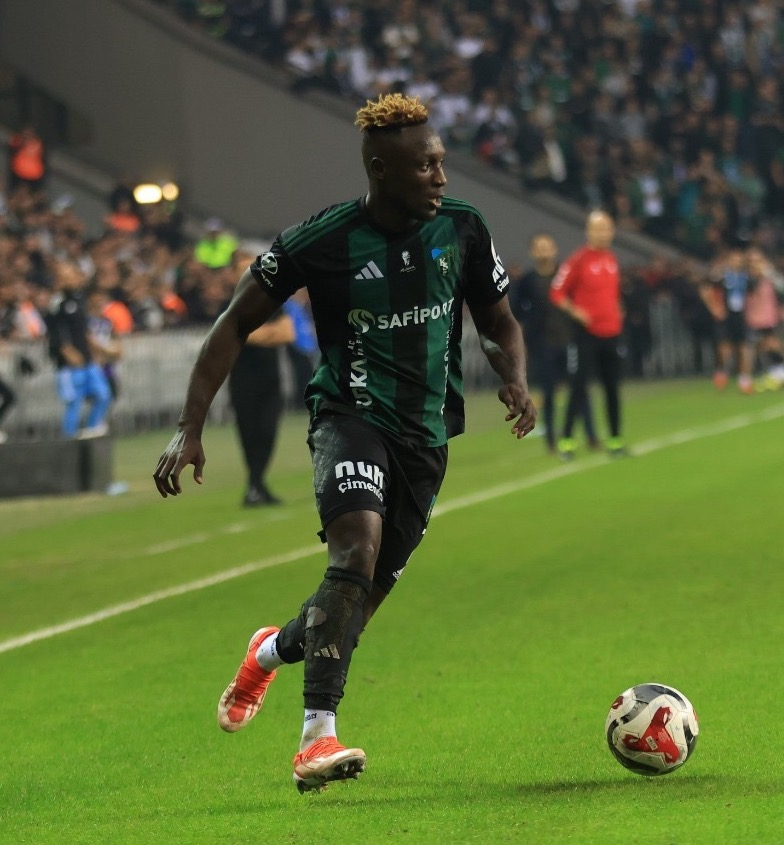
- Agyei playing for Kocaelispor in 2025

Personal information
- Full name: Daniel Ebenezer Kwasi Agyei
- Date of birth: 1 June 1997 (age 29)
- Place of birth: Kingston upon Thames, England
- Height: 1.83 m (6 ft 0 in)
- Positions: Forward; winger

Team information
- Current team: Kocaelispor
- Number: 7

Youth career
- 2013–2015: AFC Wimbledon

Senior career*
Years	Team	Apps	(Gls)
2015–2019	Burnley	3	(0)
2016–2017	→ Coventry City (loan)	16	(4)
2017–2018	→ Walsall (loan)	18	(4)
2018	→ Blackpool (loan)	9	(0)
2019–2022	Oxford United	66	(8)
2022–2023	Crewe Alexandra	55	(17)
2023–2025	Leyton Orient	58	(12)
2025–	Kocaelispor	40	(6)

International career^{‡}
2026–	Ghana	1	(0)
- * Club domestic league appearances and goals as of 17:50, 18 October 2026 (UTC) ‡ National team caps and goals as of 17:40, 31 May 2026 (UTC)

Daniel Ebenezer Kwasi Agyei (born 1 June 1997) is a professional footballer who plays as a forward and winger for Süper Lig club Kocaelispor. Born in England, he plays for the Ghana national team.

== Club career ==
=== Burnley ===
Agyei came through the ranks at AFC Wimbledon, scoring 35 goals for the club's under-21 team aged 17 during the 2014–15 season, drawing the attention of a host of top clubs, reportedly including West Ham United, Chelsea and Fulham. Agyei eventually signed for Burnley on a long-term contract, initially to play for the club's development squad.

After impressing for Burnley's development squad in the 2015–16 season and making his senior Burnley debut in a pre-season friendly against Bradford City, Agyei was made available for a loan move by manager Sean Dyche. Coventry City beat off competition from several clubs in League One and the Championship to secure the loan signing of Agyei on a five-month loan deal. Agyei was handed the number 9 shirt by Coventry City manager Tony Mowbray upon arrival at the Ricoh Arena.

Agyei made his professional league debut against Bradford City on 20 August 2016, handing Coventry City the lead with his first goal in professional league football in a 3–1 defeat at Valley Parade. He then scored his second goal of the season in a 2–0 home win against Rochdale. In October 2016, he scored Coventry's fastest-ever goal at the Ricoh Arena after just 19.5 seconds in a 3–1 victory over Northampton Town in the EFL Trophy. In January 2017, he returned to Burnley following the expiration of his loan, having made a total of 19 appearances and scored five goals for the Sky Blues.

He made his Burnley debut on 12 March 2017, coming on in the 88th minute to replace Scott Arfield against Liverpool.

On 31 August 2017, Agyei joined League One club Walsall on loan until January 2018. He made a total of 21 appearances in all competitions, scoring five goals, before returning to Burnley.

On 18 January 2018, Agyei joined League One club Blackpool on loan until the end of the 2017–18 season.

=== Oxford United ===
On 10 August 2019, Agyei joined League One club Oxford United on a three-year deal, with compensation to be paid to Burnley, after turning down a new contract at the Premier League club. He made his first-team debut in an EFL Trophy group-stage victory over Norwich City U21 on 3 September 2019, and his league debut as a 78th-minute substitute in a 0–0 draw away at Bolton Wanderers on 17 September.

=== Crewe Alexandra ===
On 28 January 2022, Agyei joined Crewe Alexandra on an 18-month contract for an undisclosed fee, and made his debut in Crewe's 1–0 league defeat at Gillingham on 1 February 2022. He scored his first Crewe goal, a late consolation goal in a 4–1 defeat at Accrington Stanley, on 12 February 2022. After Crewe were relegated to League Two, Agyei scored in both of Crewe's first two games of the 2022–2023 season and was the club's top goalscorer for the season with 16 goals and five assists in the league. He was named the Crewe Players' Player of the Season, and was offered a new contract by the club.

=== Leyton Orient ===
On 29 June 2023, Agyei signed for newly promoted League One club Leyton Orient on a two-year deal, but his Orient debut was delayed by injury. On 25 November 2023, he played in his first game for Orient, coming on as a second-half substitute against Wigan Athletic, and on 1 January 2024, scored his first Orient goal, in a 2–0 win at Cambridge United.

On 27 June 2025, Agyei turned down a new contract at Leyton Orient to join newly promoted Süper Lig side Kocaelispor, signing a two-year deal.

== International career ==
In March 2026, Agyei received his first call-up to the Ghana national team for a pair of friendlies.

== Career statistics ==
As of match played 25 May 2025

Appearances and goals by club, season and competition
Club	Season	League			FA Cup		League Cup		Continental		Other		Total	
Club	Season	Division	Apps	Goals	Apps	Goals	Apps	Goals	Apps	Goals	Apps	Goals	Apps	Goals
AFC Wimbledon	2014–15	League Two	0	0	0	0	0	0	—		0	0	0	0
Burnley	2015–16	Championship	0	0	0	0	0	0	—		—		0	0
Burnley	2016–17	Premier League	3	0	0	0	0	0	—		—		3	0
Burnley	2017–18	Premier League	0	0	0	0	0	0	—		—		0	0
Burnley	2018–19	Premier League	0	0	0	0	0	0	0	0	—		0	0
Burnley	Total		3	0	0	0	0	0	0	0	0	0	3	0
Coventry City (loan)	2016–17	League One	16	4	0	0	1	0	—		2 (Note: Appearances in the Football League Trophy)	1	19	5
Walsall (loan)	2017–18	League One	18	4	0	0	0	0	—		3	1	21	5
Blackpool (loan)	2017–18	League One	9	0	0	0	0	0	—		0	0	9	0
Oxford United	2019–20	League One	13	3	4	0	1	0	—		7 (Note: Four appearances in the Football League Trophy and three appearances in the League One play-offs)	0	25	3
Oxford United	2020–21	League One	39	5	0	0	1	0	—		7 (Note: Five appearances in the Football League Trophy and two appearances in the League One play-offs)	1	47	6
Oxford United	2021–22	League One	14	0	2	0	2	0	—		3	0	21	2
Oxford United	Total		66	8	6	0	4	0	0	0	17	1	93	11
Crewe Alexandra	2021–22	League One	9	1	0	0	0	0	—		0	0	9	1
Crewe Alexandra	2022–23	League Two	46	16	2	0	1	0	—		3	0	52	16
Crewe Alexandra	Total		55	17	2	0	1	0	0	0	3	0	61	17
Leyton Orient	2023–24	League One	17	5	1	0	0	0	—		0	0	18	5
Leyton Orient	2024–25	League One	41	7	3	1	3	2	—		7 (Note: Four appearances and one goal in the Football League Trophy and three appearances in the League One play-offs)	1	54	13
Leyton Orient	Total		58	12	4	1	3	2	0	0	7	1	72	18
Career total			225	45	12	1	9	2	0	0	32	4	278	56
