= Daniel Lafferty =

Northern Irish footballer (born 1989)

Danny Lafferty
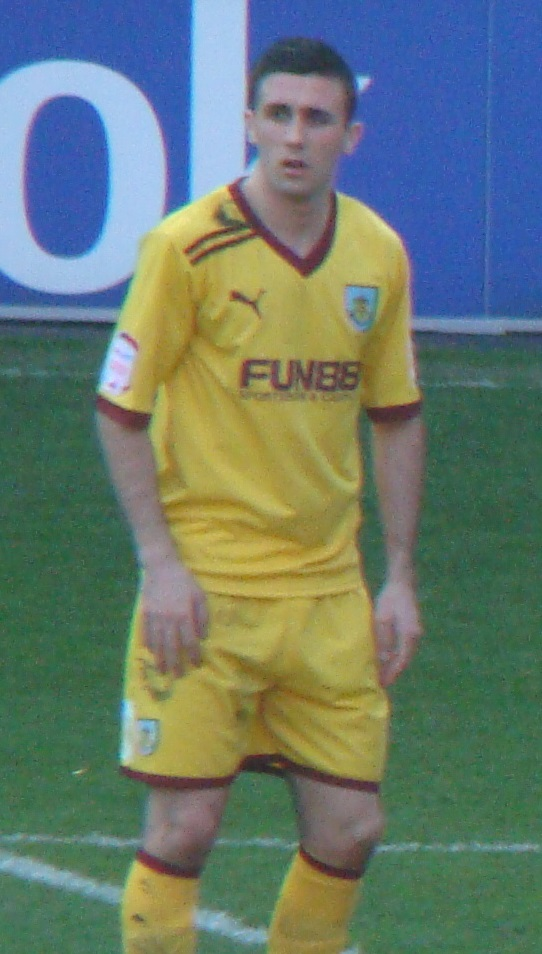
- Lafferty playing for Burnley in 2012

Personal information
- Full name: Daniel Patrick Lafferty
- Date of birth: 18 May 1989 (age 37)
- Place of birth: Derry, Northern Ireland
- Height: 6 ft 0 in (1.83 m)
- Position: Left back

Team information
- Current team: Ballymena United

Youth career
- –2006: Oxford United Stars
- 2006–2008: Celtic

Senior career*
Years	Team	Apps	(Gls)
2008–2010	Celtic	0	(0)
2010	→ Ayr United (loan)	14	(1)
2010–2011	Derry City	46	(7)
2012–2017	Burnley	40	(0)
2015	→ Rotherham United (loan)	11	(0)
2015	→ Oldham Athletic (loan)	5	(0)
2016	→ Oldham Athletic (loan)	10	(1)
2016–2017	→ Sheffield United (loan)	21	(1)
2017–2019	Sheffield United	25	(3)
2019	→ Peterborough United (loan)	18	(0)
2019–2020	Shamrock Rovers	18	(1)
2020–2022	Derry City	57	(5)
2023	Sligo Rovers	16	(1)
2024	Institute	14	(2)
2024-	Ballymena United	48	(3)

International career^{‡}
2005	Northern Ireland U17	2	(0)
2007	Northern Ireland U19	4	(0)
2008–2009	Northern Ireland U21	6	(0)
2009	Northern Ireland B	1	(0)
2012–2016	Northern Ireland	13	(0)
- * Club domestic league appearances and goals as of 29 April 2026 ‡ National team caps and goals as of 21:41, 24 March 2016 (UTC)

Daniel Patrick Lafferty (born 18 May 1989) is a Northern Irish professional footballer who plays as a left back, for Ballymena United.

== Career ==
=== Early career ===
Lafferty started his career in the youth team of Oxford United Stars before moving on to Celtic in the summer of 2006. In March 2010, joined Scottish First Division side Ayr United on loan until the end of the season. He made his début for the club in a 2–0 win over Morton, also scoring in a 1–1 draw with Dundee. In the summer of 2010, Lafferty was released by Celtic and signed for his hometown club Derry City of the League of Ireland First Division. Lafferty made 12 appearances during the 2010 season as Derry were promoted to the Premier Division as champions. During the 2011 season he spent time on trial at Championship clubs Derby County and Brighton & Hove Albion, but failed to sign a contract.

=== Burnley ===
Lafferty signed for EFL Championship side Burnley on 30 January 2012 for an undisclosed fee believed to be in the region of £150,000, after a successful trial. On 2 February 2012 he received International Clearance to play for Burnley and as such was awarded the number 3 shirt at the club which was last worn by Danny Fox. On 18 March 2012 he made his first team debut for the Clarets, starting their away fixture at Cardiff City and playing the full 90 minutes. He received a number of plaudits for his performance including that of Manager Eddie Howe and was voted as Man of the Match on Fan Site Clarets-Mad. Lafferty made his fourth appearance for Burnley in a 4–0 away defeat to Lancashire rivals Blackpool on 21 April 2012, along with four other appearances all coming in away fixtures.

In the 2012–13 season, a number injuries to Burnley defenders saw Lafferty given an extended run of opportunities in the first team and he appeared in over half the league games that season.

In March 2015, Lafferty joined another Championship side Rotherham United on a one-month loan deal. In October 2015, he joined Football League One side Oldham Athletic on a one-month loan along with compatriot Cameron Dummigan. Lafferty scored his first goal for the club in a 1–1 draw against Scunthorpe United on 27 February 2016.

=== Sheffield United ===
In August 2016 Lafferty joined Sheffield United on loan. He scored his first goal for the club in a 3–0 win against Shrewsbury Town on 18 October 2016. On 13 January 2017 the left back signed a 2 1/2-year deal with the Blades that would keep him on their books until June 2019.

On 3 January 2019, Lafferty joined Peterborough United in a loan deal that would see him stay with the League One side until the end of the 2018–19 season. He was released by Sheffield United at the end of that season.

=== Shamrock Rovers ===
Lafferty returned to the League of Ireland in August 2019, joining Shamrock Rovers. He made his debut for the club on 27 August at home versus Waterford.

Lafferty came on as sub during extra time in the 2019 FAI Cup Final in which Rovers went onto to win after beating Dundalk on penalties. It was the first time the club had won the cup since 1987 and was their 25th cup win.

In 2020 Lafferty was part of the Rovers squad who won their record 18th League of Ireland title. He scored the only goal in a crucial 1–0 win against Bohemians which turned out to be vital in the Hoops title success.

=== Return to Derry City ===
On 17 December 2020, it was announced that Lafferty had returned to his hometown club Derry City ahead of the 2021 League of Ireland Premier Division season. He scored his first league goal upon his return to the club in a 2–0 win over Longford Town. Lafferty was an unused substitute in Derry City's 4–0 win over Shelbourne in the 2022 FAI cup final, however notably scored Derry's second goal in their 3–1 victory over Shamrock Rovers in the quarter final stage.

=== Sligo Rovers ===
On the 21st of November 2022, it was announced that Lafferty had joined Sligo Rovers on a permanent deal until at least the end of the 2023 season. He was released at the end of the season after making 17 appearances in all competitions for the club, scoring 1 goal.

=== Institute ===
It was announced on 24 January 2024 that he had signed for NIFL Championship club Institute.

He made his debut as a second-half substitute in a 2–2 away draw against Ards in the league.

=== Ballymena United ===
On 20 June 2024, Ballymena United announced that the club had reached an agreement on a one-year contract with Lafferty, effective upon expiry of his contract with Institute.

== International career ==
Lafferty was called up to the Northern Ireland under-17 side in September 2005, making his début in a 1–0 victory over Lithuania in a 2006 UEFA European Under-17 Championship qualifying round match. He went on to make one further appearance in the qualifiers for the under-17 side. He also went on to gain four caps for the under-19 side. He made his début for the under-21 side in August 2008, featuring in a mini-tournament held in Ukraine, playing in defeats to Poland and the hosts. He made his competitive début for the side in September 2008 in the 2009 UEFA European Under-21 Championship qualifier against Germany, which finished in a 3–0 defeat. He also played in a 2011 UEFA European Under-21 Championship qualifier in a defeat to Czech Republic, in what proved to be his final game at that level gaining a total of six caps. He made his début for Northern Ireland B in May 2009, featuring in an inexperienced side that lost 3–0 to Scotland. In May 2012, he won his first call-up to the senior squad for an international friendly against the Netherlands. He made his début in the 6–0 defeat. His competitive international début came in November 2012 in a 2014 FIFA World Cup qualifier against Azerbaijan, which ended in a 1–1 draw.

Following an absence from the national squad, after regained form with Sheffield United, Lafferty was recalled for a 2018 FIFA World Cup qualification match against Norway in March 2017 but was an unused substitute. He was called up again for a World Cup Qualifier against Azerbaijan and a friendly against New Zealand, again Lafferty was an unused substitute in both matches in June 2017. He made the national squad for World Cup qualifiers against San Marino and the Czech Republic in September 2017.

== Career statistics ==
=== Club ===
As of match played 21 July 2023

Appearances and goals by club, season and competition
Club	Season	League			National Cup		League Cup		Other		Total	
Club	Season	Division	Apps	Goals	Apps	Goals	Apps	Goals	Apps	Goals	Apps	Goals
Celtic	2008–09	Scottish Premier League	0	0	0	0	0	0	0	0	0	0
Celtic	2009–10	Scottish Premier League	0	0	0	0	0	0	0	0	0	0
Celtic	Total		0	0	0	0	0	0	0	0	0	0
Ayr United (loan)	2009–10	Scottish First Division	14	1	—		—		—		14	1
Derry City	2010	LOI First Division	12	0	—		—		—		12	0
Derry City	2011	LOI Premier Division	34	7	1	0	2	0	0	0	37	7
Derry City	Total		46	7	1	0	2	0	0	0	49	6
Burnley	2011–12	Championship	5	0	—		—		—		5	0
Burnley	2012–13	Championship	24	0	1	0	1	0	—		26	0
Burnley	2013–14	Championship	10	0	1	0	1	0	—		12	0
Burnley	2014–15	Premier League	1	0	1	0	0	0	—		2	0
Burnley	2015–16	Championship	0	0	0	0	0	0	—		0	0
Burnley	2016–17	Premier League	0	0	—		0	0	—		0	0
Burnley	Total		40	0	3	0	2	0	—		45	0
Rotherham United (loan)	2014–15	Championship	11	0	—		—		—		11	0
Oldham Athletic (loan)	2015–16	League One	15	1	—		—		—		15	1
Sheffield United	2016–17	League One	37	4	1	0	—		0	0	38	4
Sheffield United	2017–18	Championship	8	0	3	0	2	1	—		13	1
Sheffield United	2018–19	Championship	1	0	—		0	0	—		1	0
Sheffield United	Total		46	4	4	0	2	1	0	0	52	5
Peterborough United (loan)	2018–19	League One	18	0	1	0	—		2	0	21	0
Shamrock Rovers	2019	LOI Premier Division	7	0	3	0	—		—		10	0
Shamrock Rovers	2020	LOI Premier Division	11	1	4	2	—		1	0	16	3
Shamrock Rovers	Total		18	1	7	2	0	0	1	0	26	3
Derry City	2021	LOI Premier Division	32	5	1	1	—		—		33	6
Derry City	2022	LOI Premier Division	25	0	1	0	—		1	0	27	0
Derry City	Total		57	5	2	1	—		1	0	60	6
Sligo Rovers	2023	LOI Premier Division	16	2	1	0	—		—		17	2
Institute	2023–24	NIFL Championship	0	0	0	0	—		—		0	0
Career total			281	21	19	3	6	1	4	0	310	25

=== International ===
As of match played 24 March 2016.

Appearances and goals by national team and year
National team	Year	Apps	Goals
Northern Ireland	2012	2	0
Northern Ireland	2013	6	0
Northern Ireland	2014	2	0
Northern Ireland	2015	2	0
Northern Ireland	2016	1	0
Total		13	0

== Honours ==
Derry City

- League of Ireland Cup: 2011
- FAI Cup: 2022

Burnley

- Football League Championship runner-up: 2013–14

Sheffield United

- EFL League One: 2016–17

Shamrock Rovers

- League of Ireland Premier Division: 2020
- FAI Cup: 2019
