= David Jones (footballer, born 1984) =

English footballer (born 1984)

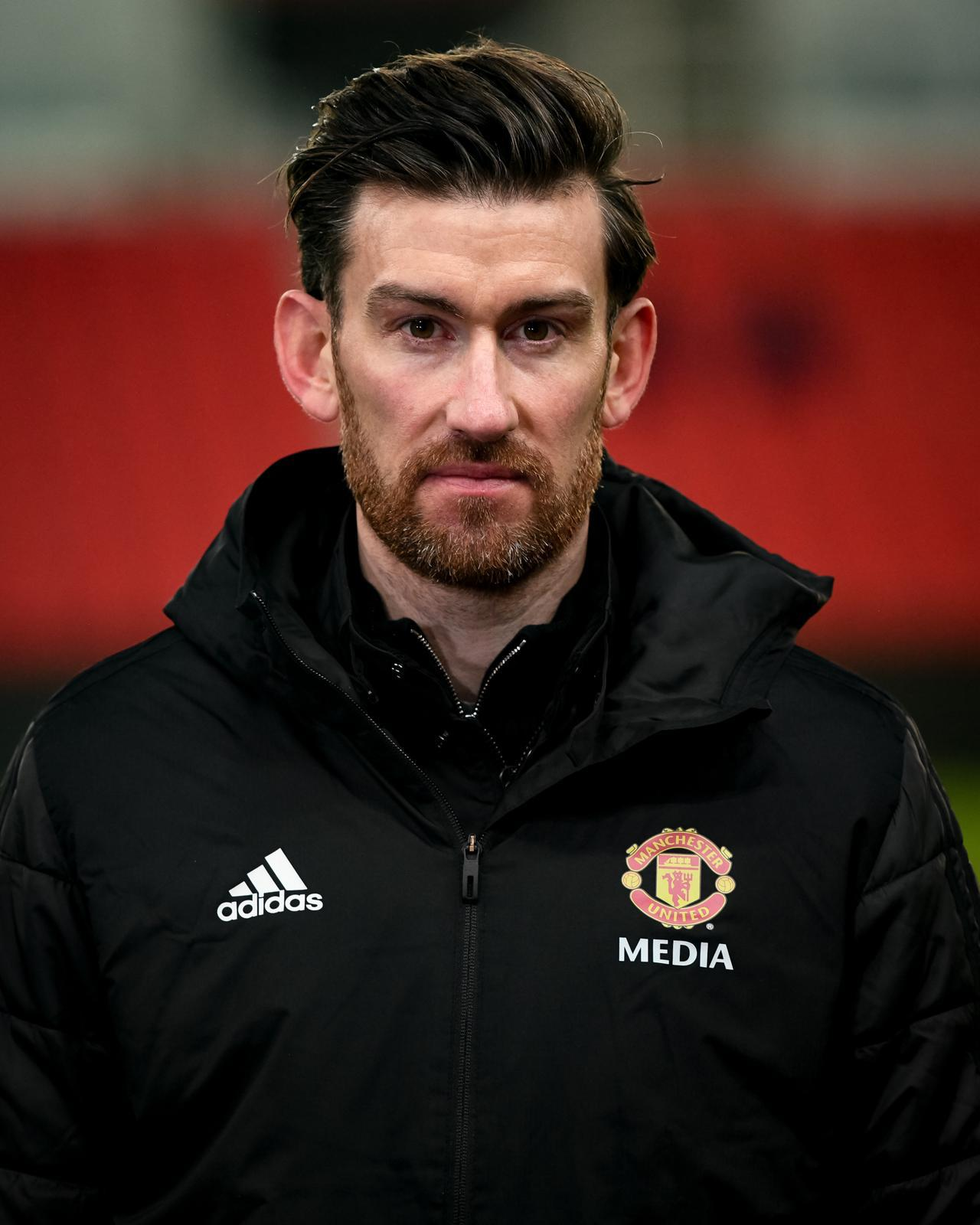
- Jones in 2020

Personal information
- Full name: David Frank Llwyd Jones
- Date of birth: 4 November 1984 (age 42)
- Place of birth: Southport, England
- Height: 6 ft 1 in (1.85 m)
- Position: Midfielder

Team information
- Current team: Wrexham (First team coach)

Youth career
- 1994–1995: Wrexham
- 1995–2003: Manchester United

Senior career*
Years	Team	Apps	(Gls)
2003–2007	Manchester United	0	(0)
2005–2006	→ Preston North End (loan)	24	(3)
2006	→ NEC (loan)	17	(6)
2006–2007	→ Derby County (loan)	10	(1)
2007–2008	Derby County	32	(6)
2008–2011	Wolverhampton Wanderers	66	(6)
2011–2013	Wigan Athletic	29	(0)
2013	→ Blackburn Rovers (loan)	12	(2)
2013–2016	Burnley	124	(2)
2016–2019	Sheffield Wednesday	57	(1)
2019–2020	Oldham Athletic	6	(0)
2021–2022	Wrexham	4	(1)
Total		381	(28)

International career
2004	England U21	1	(0)

Managerial career
- 2021–2022: Wrexham (player-coach)
- 2022–: Wrexham (first team coach)
- * Club domestic league appearances and goals as of 11:32, 23 April 2023 (UTC)

David Frank Llwyd Jones (born 4 November 1984) is an English professional football coach and former player who is the first team coach at Welsh club Wrexham. As a player, Jones was promoted to the Premier League on four occasions with three different clubs and as first team coach with Wrexham has achieved three consecutive promotions from the National League to the Championship. Jones began his playing career at Manchester United, but struggled to get into the first team and was limited to appearances in the FA Cup and League Cup. He spent loan spells at Preston North End, NEC and Derby County, before joining Derby on a permanent basis in 2007 for a fee of £1 million. However, he left Derby after just one season to join Wolverhampton Wanderers in a deal worth £1.2 million. He spent three years with Wolves before joining Wigan Athletic. At the end of his second season there, he went on a brief loan spell with Blackburn Rovers, before joining Burnley. After three years with Burnley, he left for Sheffield Wednesday, where he spent another three years before being released at the end of the 2018–19 season. He joined Oldham Athletic on a free transfer but was released in January 2020. He was without a club while football was suspended due to the COVID-19 pandemic, but in August 2021, he signed for Wrexham as a player-coach. In June 2022, he retired from football to become a coach full-time at Wrexham.

Jones represented England at under-21 level, but he also had a parental qualification to play for Wales.

== Club career ==
=== Manchester United ===
Born in Southport, Jones joined Manchester United in 1995 at the age of 10. He made eight appearances for the under-17 side in the 2000–01 season, and signed as an apprentice on 2 July 2001, before breaking into the Under-19 side in early 2002. He was made captain of the Under-19s at the start of the 2002–03 season, and went on to make 18 appearances, scoring one goal, as the team progressed to the final of the FA Youth Cup in April 2003, where a 2–0 victory over Middlesbrough in the second leg saw him lift the trophy at Old Trafford.

The following season saw Jones promoted to the reserve team, where he established himself as a regular in the heart of midfield. He was named as a substitute for a League Cup tie against West Bromwich Albion in December 2003, but did not feature in the game. In the 2004–05 season, Manchester United introduced a second reserve team to play in the Pontins' Holiday League, in addition to the existing FA Premier Reserve League North side. Jones was named as captain of the latter and also made regular appearances for the former. Jones experienced a great deal of success with the reserve sides, lifting the FA Premier Reserve League North trophy and then captaining the side to victory over Charlton Athletic Reserves (winners of the FAPRL South) to take the national title. He also featured as the reserves secured the Pontins Holiday League title and the Pontins Holiday League Cup, once again acting as captain as Manchester United were narrowly denied a fifth trophy at the hands of Manchester City Reserves in the final of the Manchester Seniors Cup.

Jones was allocated a squad number, 31, during the 2003–04 season and made his senior debut as a late substitute in a 1–0 home win over Arsenal in the League Cup. He made his full team debut in Manchester United's shock 0–0 home draw with non-league Exeter City in the FA Cup third round. Despite these opportunities Jones found it hard to break into the first team ahead of Roy Keane and Paul Scholes and spent much of the remainder of his Manchester United career either in the reserves or out on loan.

=== Preston North End ===
For the 2004–05 season Jones was sent on a season long loan to Football League Championship side Preston North End to gain first-team experience making his debut at Watford on 6 August 2005. Good performances from the bench soon saw him established as first-choice in midfield and he scored his first goal for the club in a 4–0 away win at Ipswich Town on 29 August 2005. Jones played a key role in a long unbeaten run which pushed Preston up into the Championship play-off positions, making 24 appearances, including three as substitute, and scoring 3 goals.

=== NEC Nijmegen ===
Jones' spell at Preston was followed by joining Eredivisie side NEC Nijmegen on a loan deal until the end 2005–06 season. Wearing number five, he again had to spend time on the substitutes bench to begin with, but impressed sufficiently in brief appearances against Ajax and Sparta Rotterdam to be brought on at half-time against ADO Den Haag on 22 January 2006. Jones scored two goals in a 5–0 win to secure a place in the starting line-up for the next game, where he again scored twice, this time to salvage a draw against Willem II. One of those goals was from the penalty spot. He started every game for the rest of the season in a left centre midfield role in NEC's 4–3–3 formation. During a match against Heracles, he scored a goal from 30 yards. In the match against FC Groningen, he again scored a goal from a free kick, just 25 yards out, receiving the Man of the Match award. In the short time he was with NEC Nijmegen, he got himself placed second on their Man of the Year list, with 134 points, thirty points behind talented striker Romano Denneboom. The team ended 10th in 2006 and Jones returned to England having signed a new three-year deal at Manchester United.

Despite his success in the Netherlands, the arrival of £14 million Michael Carrick from Tottenham meant Jones was restricted to appearances in the League Cup. On 15 November 2006, a bid of £1 million from Derby County was accepted. The deal would see Jones initially move on loan to Pride Park until the January transfer window – the first possible opportunity to make the transfer a permanent one. In moving to Derby, Jones would link up once again with Billy Davies, manager of Preston during his loan spell there.

=== Derby County ===
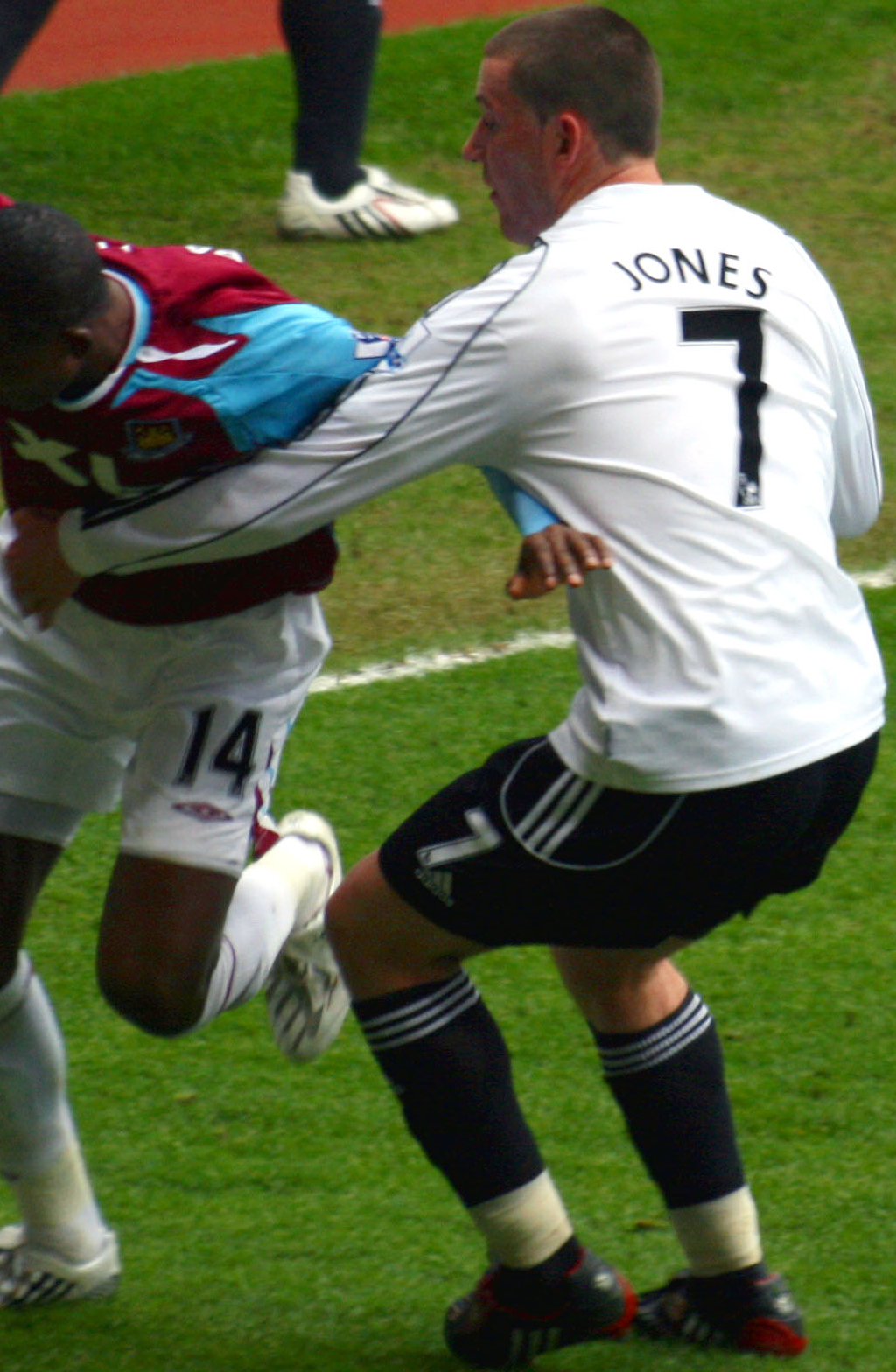
Jones (7) attempting to tackle West Ham number 14 John Paintsil during his time at Derby County.

Jones' Derby career started promisingly, with the midfielder establishing himself as first choice in midfield and contributing significantly to Derby's push for promotion, including scoring a stoppage-time free-kick in the 1–0 home win against Sheffield Wednesday. Alex Ferguson once remarked that he had sold Jones too cheaply to Derby. However, as the season drew to a close Derby's form took a dip and Jones found himself moving to the fringes of the first team, only appearing as an 87th-minute substitute in the 1–0 victory over West Bromwich Albion in the Championship Playoff Final which promoted Derby to the Premier League.

Despite Derby struggling on their return to the top flight Jones was unable to force himself into the first team on a regular basis, playing only 15 times in the league. He scored the first top flight goal of his career in Derby's 6–1 defeat at Chelsea on 12 March 2008. Jones was in and out of the side under new manager Paul Jewell, although he did make 12 of his 15 appearances that season under Jewell.

=== Wolverhampton Wanderers ===
Jones signed for Wolverhampton Wanderers of the Championship on 27 June 2008 in a three-year deal for a reported fee of £1.2 million. He made his Wolves debut on the opening day of the 2008–09 season at Plymouth Argyle and scored his first goal in a 5–1 win over Nottingham Forest on 30 August. He became a regular fixture in the first team squad throughout the season until a suspected injury halted his run in early 2009. He returned to the side during the final stages as the club eventually won promotion to the Premier League as champions, Jones' second promotion in three seasons.

Jones' return to the top flight was initially curtailed by several injury setbacks to a troublesome knee problem that had occurred in the previous season. However, he returned to the central midfield in early 2010 at the expense of Nenad Milijaš and scored his first Premier League goal for Wolves when he finished an 18-pass move to defeat Tottenham Hotspur. His performances during the remainder of the season helped the club to survival and saw Jones be offered a new contract. However, Jones rejected a new contract with Wolves, with only 12 months left to run on his existing deal. Despite rejecting a new contract, Jones will continue to give 100 per cent in the upcoming season. After scoring an opener for Wolves in a 2–1 win over Stoke City on the opening day, Jones is still hoping to sign a new contract with the club. Jones scored the fifth goal in the game in a 5–0 win over Doncaster Rovers putting Wolves through to the next round of the FA Cup. Since February 2011, Jones has not featured since early February under McCarthy.

However, Jones failed to agree the terms of a new contract and he instead exited Wolves at the expiry of his deal in May 2011.

=== Wigan Athletic ===
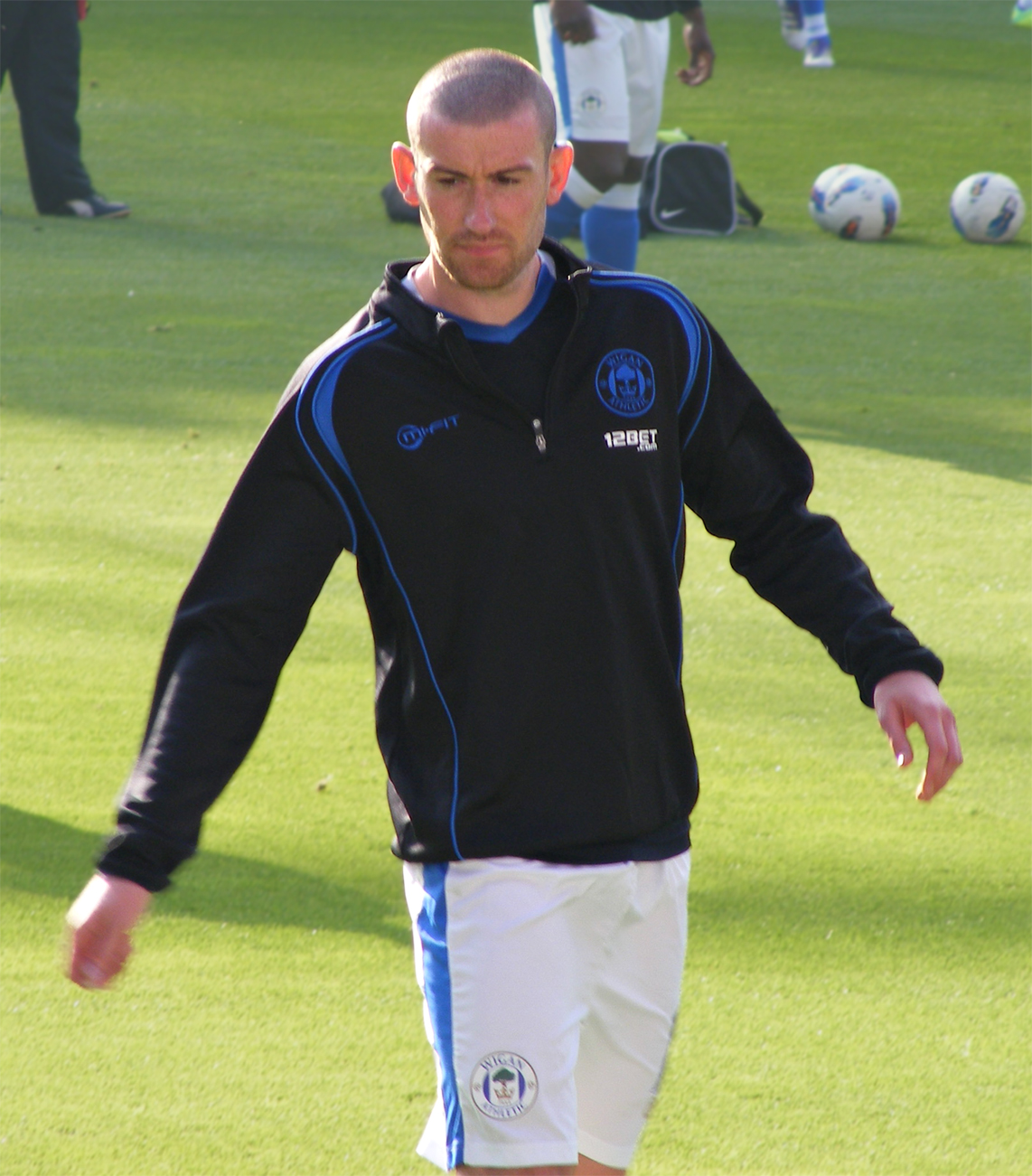
Jones warming up before the match against Bolton on 15 October 2011.

On 2 August 2011, Jones was signed by Wigan Athletic on a free transfer after impressing on trial during the pre-season. On the opening day of the Premier League season Jones was on the bench for the match against Norwich City, but was not used. He made his Wigan debut on 13 September 2011 as Wigan lost 2–1 to Crystal Palace in the League Cup. He made his league debut after coming on for Jordi Gomez in the 71st minute of a 3–1 loss to Everton on 17 September 2011.

=== Blackburn Rovers ===
On 2 March 2013, Jones completed an emergency loan move to Blackburn Rovers for the remainder of the season. He made his debut the same day and scored in a 3–2 defeat to Peterborough United. He later thanked Wigan manager Roberto Martínez for allowing him the opportunity to go out on loan.

=== Burnley ===
After media speculation that Jones would make his loan deal at Ewood Park permanent, it was a surprise to many when Jones began training with Rovers' East Lancashire rivals, Burnley in July 2013. Jones was included in Sean Dyche's squad that embarked on a pre-season training camp in Cork, which included a friendly against Cork City, in which Jones played. Jones played in Burnley's other pre-season victories against Tranmere Rovers, Carlisle United and Sparta Rotterdam and on 1 August 2013, Jones completed a permanent move to Burnley on a free transfer. Jones scored his first goal for Burnley on 6 August in a 4–0 win at York City along with goals from Junior Stanislas, Danny Ings and a first goal for new arrival Scott Arfield. Jones scored his first league goal for the club on 1 March 2014, during a 2–0 win over Derby County.

=== Sheffield Wednesday ===
On 16 August 2016, Jones joined Championship side Sheffield Wednesday for an undisclosed fee. He scored his first goal for Sheffield Wednesday – his first for almost two years – in a 1–1 draw against Sunderland on 16 August 2017.

He was released by Sheffield Wednesday at the end of the 2018–19 season.

=== Oldham Athletic ===
After his release by Sheffield Wednesday, Jones trained with former employers Burnley but only to keep his fitness levels up while looking for a new club. He joined Oldham Athletic on a free transfer, but would be released only a few months later, having played six games for the club.

=== Wrexham ===
On 17 August 2021, Jones joined Wrexham as a player-coach after a successful trial. On 1 June 2022, after his contract as a player-coach ended, Wrexham offered Jones the opportunity to continue in his role as the Club's First Team Coach.

== Coaching career ==
Jones joined Wrexham on 17 August 2021 joined as a player-coach and a year later was named as reserve team manager. In June 2022 Jones retired as a player and was appointed as Wrexham's First team coach.

== International career ==
Jones was called up to the England under-21 squad during the 2003–04 season. Although qualified to play for Wales, Jones opted to play for England at that level and made what was to be his only appearance for the under-21 side in a 2–2 away draw with Sweden on 30 March 2004, coming on as a second-half substitute for Nigel Reo-Coker.

== Career statistics ==
As of match played 4 December 2021

Appearances and goals by club, season and competition
Club	Season	League			FA Cup		League Cup		Other		Total	
Club	Season	Division	Apps	Goals	Apps	Goals	Apps	Goals	Apps	Goals	Apps	Goals
Manchester United	2003–04	Premier League	0	0	0	0	0	0	0	0	0	0
Manchester United	2004–05	Premier League	0	0	1	0	1	0	0	0	2	0
Manchester United	2005–06	Premier League	0	0	0	0	—		0	0	0	0
Manchester United	2006–07	Premier League	0	0	—		2	0	0	0	2	0
Manchester United	Total		0	0	1	0	3	0	0	0	4	0
Preston North End (loan)	2005–06	Championship	24	3	—		1	0	—		25	3
NEC (loan)	2005–06	Eredivisie	17	6	—		—		0	0	17	6
Derby County	2006–07	Championship	28	6	2	0	—		2 (Note: Appearances in Football League Championship play-offs)	0	32	6
Derby County	2007–08	Premier League	14	1	0	0	1	0	—		15	1
Derby County	Total		42	7	2	0	1	0	2	0	47	7
Wolverhampton Wanderers	2008–09	Championship	34	4	2	0	1	0	—		37	4
Wolverhampton Wanderers	2009–10	Premier League	20	1	2	1	2	0	—		24	2
Wolverhampton Wanderers	2010–11	Premier League	12	1	2	1	1	0	—		15	2
Wolverhampton Wanderers	Total		66	6	6	2	4	0	—		76	8
Wigan Athletic	2011–12	Premier League	16	0	0	0	1	0	—		17	0
Wigan Athletic	2012–13	Premier League	13	0	2	0	3	0	—		18	0
Wigan Athletic	Total		29	0	2	0	4	0	—		35	0
Blackburn Rovers (loan)	2012–13	Championship	12	2	—		—		—		12	2
Burnley	2013–14	Championship	46	1	1	0	2	1	—		49	2
Burnley	2014–15	Premier League	36	0	1	0	1	0	—		38	0
Burnley	2015–16	Championship	41	1	2	0	0	0	—		43	1
Burnley	2016–17	Premier League	1	0	—		—		—		1	0
Burnley	Total		124	2	4	0	3	1	—		131	3
Sheffield Wednesday	2016–17	Championship	29	0	1	0	—		1	0	31	0
Sheffield Wednesday	2017–18	Championship	27	1	5	0	1	0	—		33	1
Sheffield Wednesday	2018–19	Championship	1	0	0	0	1	0	—		2	0
Sheffield Wednesday	Total		57	1	6	0	2	0	1	0	66	1
Oldham Athletic	2019–20	League Two	6	0	0	0	—		—		6	0
Wrexham	2021–22	National League	4	1	0	0	—		—		4	1
Career total			381	28	21	2	18	1	3	0	423	31

== Honours ==
Derby County

- Football League Championship play-offs: 2007

Wolverhampton Wanderers

- Football League Championship: 2008–09

Burnley

- Football League Championship: 2015–16

Individual

- Denzil Haroun Reserve Team Player of the Year: 2003–04
