= Luke Conlan =

Northern Irish footballer (born 1994)

Personal information
- Full name: Luke Vincent Conlan
- Date of birth: 31 October 1994 (age 32)
- Place of birth: Portaferry, Northern Ireland
- Height: 5 ft 11 in (1.80 m)
- Position: Defender

Team information
- Current team: Cliftonville
- Number: 14

Youth career
- 2011–2012: Burnley

Senior career*
Years	Team	Apps	(Gls)
2012–2016	Burnley	0	(0)
2015–2016	→ St Mirren (loan)	3	(0)
2016	→ Morecambe (loan)	16	(0)
2016–2020	Morecambe	124	(0)
2020–2024	AFC Fylde	102	(9)
2024–	Cliftonville	37	(2)

International career
2010	Northern Ireland U16	5	(0)
2010	Northern Ireland U17	2	(0)
2012	Northern Ireland U19	2	(0)
2013–2016	Northern Ireland U21	11	(0)
- * Club domestic league appearances and goals as of 29 April 2026

Luke Vincent Conlan (born 31 October 1994) is a Northern Irish professional footballer who plays as a defender for NIFL Premiership side Cliftonville.

== Club career ==
Born in Portaferry, County Down, Conlan attended St Columba's School in the town and played for junior clubs Grosvenor Youth and Portaferry. He was recruited by Championship side Burnley in the summer of 2011, signing a two-year scholarship with the club. He was a key member of the youth side that reached the 2011–12 FA Youth Cup semi-finals, eventually losing 3–1 to Blackburn Rovers on aggregate.

In March 2012, whilst still a first-year apprentice, Conlan signed his first professional contract in a two-year deal. He remained a regular in the youth and reserve sides until he suffered a knee injury, and in April 2014 it was announced by Burnley that he would not be retained at the end of the season when his contract expired. However, he continued to train with the club during pre-season and in September 2014, after recovering from injury, he signed a one-year contract extension with the club. In April 2015, it was announced that Conlan had signed another one-year contract extension until the summer of 2016.

In July 2015 he signed for Scottish Championship side St Mirren on a season-long loan deal. He made his debut for the club in the 3–1 Scottish Challenge Cup victory over Berwick Rangers. Conlan received his first senior red card in the Renfrewshire derby against Greenock Morton on 21 August 2015. The match ended 0–0. Conlan returned to Burnley in January 2016, having failed to break into the St Mirren first team. In January 2016, he was sent on a one-month youth loan to Football League Two side Morecambe.

In June 2019 he signed a new contract with Morecambe. He scored his first professional goal for Morecambe when he scored in an EFL Trophy tie against Carlisle United on 12 November 2019.

In September 2020 he signed for AFC Fylde. He was released at the end of the 2023–24 season.

On 10 May 2024, it was announced that 2023–24 Irish Cup winners Cliftonville had signed Conlan upon his release from AFC Fylde.

== International career ==
Conlan has been capped at under-16, under-17, under-19 and under-21 level for Northern Ireland.

== Career statistics ==
As of match played 17 September 2022

Appearances and goals by club, season and competition
Club	Season	League			National Cup		League Cup		Other		Total	
Club	Season	Division	Apps	Goals	Apps	Goals	Apps	Goals	Apps	Goals	Apps	Goals
Burnley	2013–14	Championship	0	0	0	0	0	0	—		0	0
Burnley	2014–15	Premier League	0	0	0	0	0	0	—		0	0
Burnley	2015–16	Championship	0	0	0	0	0	0	—		0	0
Burnley	Total		0	0	0	0	0	0	0	0	0	0
St Mirren (loan)	2015–16	Scottish Championship	3	0	—		0	0	1 (Note: Appearance in Scottish Challenge Cup)	0	4	0
Morecambe (loan)	2015–16	League Two	16	0	—		—		—		16	0
Morecambe	2016–17	League Two	21	0	0	0	2	0	2 (Note: Appearance(s) in Football League Trophy)	0	25	0
Morecambe	2017–18	League Two	27	0	0	0	0	0	3	0	30	0
Morecambe	2018–19	League Two	40	0	2	0	1	0	2	0	45	0
Morecambe	2019–20	League Two	20	0	1	0	2	0	2	1	25	1
Morecambe	Total		124	0	3	0	5	0	9	1	141	1
AFC Fylde	2020–21	National League North	15	1	4	0	—		2 (Note: Appearances in FA Trophy)	0	21	1
AFC Fylde	2021–22	National League North	33	0	2	0	—		3 (Note: Two appearances in FA Trophy, one in National League North play-offs)	0	38	0
AFC Fylde	2022–23	National League North	4	1	1	0	—		0	0	5	1
AFC Fylde	Total		52	2	7	0	—		5	0	64	2
Career total			179	2	10	0	5	0	15	1	209	3
