= Alex Whitmore =

English footballer (born 1995)

Personal information
- Full name: Alexander James Whitmore
- Date of birth: 7 September 1995 (age 31)
- Place of birth: Newcastle upon Tyne, England
- Height: 6 ft 1 in (1.85 m)
- Position: Centre back

Team information
- Current team: Solihull Moors
- Number: 5

Youth career
- Wallsend Boys Club
- 2012–2015: Burnley

Senior career*
Years	Team	Apps	(Gls)
2015–2018	Burnley	0	(0)
2015	→ Chester (loan)	5	(0)
2016	→ Gateshead (loan)	19	(2)
2016–2017	→ Morecambe (loan)	15	(0)
2017	→ Morecambe (loan)	20	(0)
2017–2018	→ Bury (loan)	8	(0)
2018	Chesterfield	15	(1)
2018–2019	Grimsby Town	31	(1)
2019–2023	AFC Fylde	120	(8)
2023–	Solihull Moors	102	(7)
- * Club domestic league appearances and goals as of 18:08, 22 March 2026 (UTC)

Alexander James Whitmore (born 7 September 1995) is an English professional footballer who plays as a central defender for National League club Solihull Moors.

After playing youth football with Wallsend Boys Club, Whitmore turned professional with Burnley in 2014, and had spells at Chester, Gateshead, Morecambe, Bury and Chesterfield. He signed for Grimsby Town in May 2018 and joined AFC Fylde in June 2019. Whitmore signed for Solihull Moors for an undisclosed fee in November 2023.

== Career ==
Born in Newcastle upon Tyne, Whitmore started his career with local youth side Wallsend Boys Club, where he played until the age of sixteen. In July 2012, he joined Burnley on a two-year scholarship deal. He progressed through the youth side and was named as captain in his second season at the club, signing his first professional contract in March 2014. He was moved into the development squad and remained there for one season before he signed a new one-year contract extension in April 2015. He received a place in the first team squad for the pre-season tour of Scotland in the summer of 2015.

In November 2015, he joined National League side Chester on a one-month youth loan deal. He made his senior debut in the 1–1 league draw with Dover Athletic, playing the full ninety minutes. He made five appearances during his month at the Deva Stadium, however, he turned down the option to extend his loan despite interest from Chester manager Steve Burr.

In January 2016, he instead chose to join National League rivals Gateshead on a loan deal until the end of the season, preferring to move closer to his North East roots. He was a first team regular for the club and made twenty-three appearances in all competitions, scoring twice. His performances during the spell convinced Burnley to extend his contract for a further year.

In July 2016, he joined League Two side Morecambe on a loan deal until January 2017. He made his debut in August 2016, in the opening day 2–0 defeat to Grimsby Town. He made 23 appearances for Morecambe during his loan spell, playing regularly despite missing seven games due to suspension after receiving two red cards. Later in January 2017, Whitmore returned to Morecambe until the end of the season on loan after their transfer embargo was lifted.

On 31 July 2017, Whitmore signed for Football League One side Bury on loan until January 2018. He made a total of eleven appearances in all competitions before returning to Burnley having found it difficult to hold down a first team place.

On 18 January 2018, Whitmore signed for Football League Two side Chesterfield on a 2 1/2-year deal.

On 30 May 2018, Whitmore signed a one-year contract with League Two side Grimsby Town on a free transfer.

In June 2019, he signed for AFC Fylde. He captained the club to the National League North title in the 2022–23 season, subsequently being named in the division's team of the season.

He signed for Solihull Moors in November 2023. On 17 April 2026, the club said the player would be leaving at the end of his contract, but in June it was announced that Whitmore would stay with the club.

== Career statistics ==
As of match played 16 October 2021

Appearances and goals by club, season and competition
Club	Season	League			FA Cup		League Cup		Other		Total	
Club	Season	Division	Apps	Goals	Apps	Goals	Apps	Goals	Apps	Goals	Apps	Goals
Burnley	2015–16	Championship	0	0	0	0	0	0	—		0	0
Burnley	2016–17	Premier League	0	0	—		—		—		0	0
Burnley	2017–18	Premier League	0	0	—		—		—		0	0
Burnley	Total		0	0	0	0	0	0	—		0	0
Chester (loan)	2015–16	National League	5	0	—		—		0	0	5	0
Gateshead (loan)	2015–16	National League	19	2	—		—		4	0	23	2
Morecambe (loan)	2016–17	League Two	35	0	2	0	2	0	4	0	43	0
Bury (loan)	2017–18	League One	8	0	0	0	1	0	2	0	11	0
Chesterfield	2017–18	League Two	15	1	0	0	0	0	0	0	15	1
Grimsby Town	2018–19	League Two	31	1	0	0	1	0	3	0	35	1
AFC Fylde	2019–20	National League	34	1	4	0	—		4	0	42	1
AFC Fylde	2020–21	National League North	15	1	4	0	—		2	0	21	1
AFC Fylde	2021–22	National League North	9	2	2	0	—		0	0	11	2
AFC Fylde	Total		58	4	10	0	—		6	0	74	4
Career total			171	8	12	0	4	0	19	0	206	8

== Honours ==
AFC Fylde

- National League North: 2022–23

Solihull Moors

- FA Trophy runner-up: 2023–24

Individual

- National League North Team of the Year: 2022–23
