= Renny Smith =

English-born Austrian footballer

Personal information
- Full name: Renny Piers Smith
- Date of birth: 3 October 1996 (age 30)
- Place of birth: Epsom, England
- Height: 1.82 m (6 ft 0 in)
- Position: Midfielder

Team information
- Current team: Farnborough
- Number: 16

Youth career
- –2013: Chelsea
- 2013–2015: Arsenal

Senior career*
Years	Team	Apps	(Gls)
2015–2016	Burnley	0	(0)
2016	→ GAIS (loan)	10	(0)
2016–2017	Vicenza	2	(0)
2017	→ Mantova (loan)	13	(1)
2017–2018	Südtirol	29	(0)
2018–2020	FC Dordrecht	62	(8)
2020–2022	WSG Tirol	37	(3)
2023–2024	Oxford City	25	(1)
2024	Hemel Hempstead Town	1	(0)
2025–	Farnborough	32	(2)

International career^{‡}
2014	Austria U18	2	(0)
2014	Austria U19	1	(0)
- * Club domestic league appearances and goals as of 21:53, 22 October 2026 (UTC) ‡ National team caps and goals as of 5 September 2014

Renny Piers Smith (born 3 October 1996) is a professional footballer who plays as a midfielder for Farnborough. Born in England, he represents Austria at youth level.

He has also represented Austria internationally at under-18 and under-19 level.

== Club career ==
Smith was born in Epsom, Surrey, and attended the Whitgift School in South Croydon. He started his career in the youth team at Chelsea where he stayed until early 2013, before he made the decision to leave following a difference in opinion over his playing position. He subsequently joined London rivals Arsenal on a two-year scholarship, a move which followed him being on trial at clubs Liverpool and Manchester City. He featured regularly for Arsenal's youth team over various competitions including the UEFA Youth League, but he failed to make the breakthrough to the first team. He failed to earn a professional deal and was released in the summer of 2015 following the end of his scholarship.

In August 2015, he signed for Championship side Burnley on a three-year contract, following a successful trial against Sheffield. He was placed immediately into the Development Squad. In February 2016 he joined Swedish Superettan side GAIS on a season-long loan, following a successful two-week trial. During his time with the club he made ten league appearances, however, he was predominantly used as a substitute or remained on the bench.

In August 2016, he was recalled early from his loan with GAIS and was sold to Italian Serie B side Vicenza for a nominal fee. He made his professional debut for the side in November 2016, replacing Francesco Signori as a substitute in the 1–0 league win over Trapani Calcio. On 31 January 2017, Smith joined Lega Pro side Mantova on loan.

On 5 July 2018, Smith joined Dutch side Dordrecht on a three-year deal.

On 15 September 2020, Smith joined Austrian Bundesliga side WSG Tirol on a free transfer. He left the club at the end of the 2021–22 season.

On 26 September 2023, Smith signed for Oxford City.

On 31 July 2025, following a successful trial period, Smith joined National League South side, Farnborough.

== International career ==
Despite being born in England, Smith qualifies to represent Austria through his maternal grandfather. His father, Renny Sr., alerted the Austrian Football Association of his eligibility, and in April 2014 he received his first call-up to the under-18 side for a friendly against Denmark, after the Association had scouted him in Arsenal youth team fixtures. He made his debut in the 2–1 win.

== Career statistics ==
As of match played 31 August 2026

Appearances and goals by club, season and competition
Club	Season	League			National Cup		League Cup		Other		Total	
Club	Season	Division	Apps	Goals	Apps	Goals	Apps	Goals	Apps	Goals	Apps	Goals
Burnley	2015–16	Championship	0	0	0	0	0	0	—		0	0
GAIS (loan)	2016	Superettan	10	0	0	0	—		—		10	0
Vicenza	2016–17	Serie B	2	0	0	0	—		—		2	0
Mantova (loan)	2016–17	Lega Pro Group B	13	1	0	0	—		—		13	1
Südtirol	2017–18	Serie C Group B	29	0	0	0	—		—		29	0
Dordrecht	2018–19	Eerste Divisie	35	4	1	0	—		—		36	4
Dordrecht	2019–20	Eerste Divisie	27	4	2	0	—		—		29	4
Dordrecht	Total		62	8	3	0	—		—		65	8
WSG Tirol	2020–21	Austrian Bundesliga	23	3	1	0	—		—		24	3
WSG Tirol	2021–22	Austrian Bundesliga	14	0	3	1	—		—		17	1
WSG Tirol	Total		37	3	4	1	—		—		41	4
Oxford City	2023–24	National League	25	1	2	0	—		0	0	27	1
Hemel Hempstead Town	2024–25	National League South	1	0	0	0	—		0	0	1	0
Farnborough	2025–26	National League South	27	2	1	0	—		0	0	28	2
Farnborough	2026–27	National League South	5	0	0	0	—		0	0	5	0
Farnborough	Total		32	2	1	0	—		0	0	33	2
Career total			211	15	10	1	0	0	0	0	221	16
