= Danijel Nizic =

Australian soccer player

Personal information
- Full name: Danijel Nizic
- Date of birth: 15 March 1995 (age 31)
- Place of birth: Sydney, Australia
- Height: 1.97 m (6 ft 5 1/2 in)
- Position: Goalkeeper

Team information
- Current team: Sutherland Sharks

Youth career
- –2013: Sydney FC

Senior career*
Years	Team	Apps	(Gls)
2013–2016	Burnley	0	(0)
2014	→ Workington (loan)	11	(0)
2014	→ Chorley (loan)	2	(0)
2015–2016	→ Crewe Alexandra (loan)	0	(0)
2016–2018	Morecambe	12	(0)
2018–2019	Western Sydney Wanderers	1	(0)
2020–2023	Sydney United	70	(0)
2023–2024	Macarthur FC	0	(0)
2025–	Sutherland Sharks	44	(0)

International career^{‡}
2013	Australia U-20	2	(0)
2017	Australia U-23	2	(0)
- * Club domestic league appearances and goals as of 5 June 2026 ‡ National team caps and goals as of 11 January 2018

Danijel Nizic (Croatian: Danijel Nižić, pronounced [dǎnijel nǐːʒitɕ]; born 15 March 1995) is an Australian professional footballer who is a goalkeeper for Sutherland Sharks.

== Club career ==
Nizic was born in Sydney, New South Wales to Australian and Croatian parents. He started his career with local side Sydney FC, before going on trial in 2012 with League One side Portsmouth. He spent a year with the side on trial but was unable to complete a permanent move to the club due to work permit issues. In July 2013, he signed for Championship side Burnley on a two-year contract after securing a work permit, also becoming fourth goalkeeper to sign for the club in the summer.

In January 2014, he joined Conference North side Workington on an initial one-month loan along with Kyle Brownhill.

In October 2015, he joined League One side Crewe Alexandra on loan, making his debut for the club in an FA Cup first round tie against non-league Eastleigh. After first choice keeper Ben Garratt had been sent off, Nizic came on as a 64th-minute substitute.

In April 2016, it was announced that Nizic was to leave Burnley at the end of the season after his contract was not renewed.

In July 2016 Nizic signed for League Two side Morecambe, after a spell on trial at the club. Nizic left Morecambe in May 2018, citing an intention to return to Australia.

He joined A-League side Western Sydney Wanderers on 4 July 2018. In November 2019, it was announced that Nizic had been released from the Wanderers, having made one league and four cup appearances.

In August 2023, Nizic returned to the A-League Men, joining Macarthur FC on a one-year contract.

== Honours ==
With Sydney United:

- (Australia) National Premier Leagues NSW Championship: 2020

== Career statistics ==
As of match played 7 November 2017

Appearances and goals by club, season and competition
Club	Season	League			FA Cup		League Cup		Other		Total	
Club	Season	Division	Apps	Goals	Apps	Goals	Apps	Goals	Apps	Goals	Apps	Goals
Workington (loan)	2013–14	Conference North	11	0	—		—		—		11	0
Chorley (loan)	2014–15	Conference North	2	0	2	0	—		—		4	0
Crewe Alexandra (loan)	2015–16	League One	0	0	1	0	—		—		1	0
Morecambe	2016–17	League Two	5	0	0	0	0	0	4 (Note: Appearances in EFL Trophy)	0	9	0
Morecambe	2017–18	League Two	2	0	0	0	1	0	3	0	6	0
Morecambe	Morecambe total		7	0	0	0	1	0	7	0	15	0
Career total			20	0	3	0	1	0	7	0	27	0
