= 2007–2009 International Challenge Trophy =

2007-09 International Challenge Trophy
Tournament details
- Dates: 14 November 2007 – 19 May 2009
- Teams: 4
- Venues: 5 (in 5 host cities)

Final positions
- Champions: Belgium (1st title)
- Runners-up: England

Tournament statistics
- Matches played: 13
- Goals scored: 32 (2.46 per match)
- Top scorer(s): Five players (2 goals each)

The 2007–09 International Challenge Trophy was the second edition of the International Challenge Trophy. It was contested by eight teams which were divided into two groups of four. The two group winners - Belgium U-21 and England C qualified for the final. Belgium U-21 won the competition after beating England C 2–0 in the final.

== Group A ==
=== Matches ===
14 November 2007

Finland U-23	0-2	England C
	(Report)	Morrison 34'; Tubbs 58'

Finnair Stadium, Helsinki, Finland

14 November 2007

Italy Lega Pro U-21	4-2	Wales Semi Pro
Dionisi 9'; Sarno 47', 60'; Olivieri 55'	(Report)	Edwards 76'; Price 81'

Stadio Franco Ossola, Varese, Italy

20 February 2008

England C	2-1	Wales Semi Pro
Cole 39'; Morrison 51'	(Report)	Lawless 49'

St James Park, Exeter, England

2 April 2008

Finland U-23	2-1	Italy Lega Pro U-21
Perovuo 41'; Hetemaj 65'	(Report)	Pepe 85' (pen.)

Finnair Stadium, Helsinki, Finland

12 November 2008

Italy Lega Pro U-21	2-2	England C
Dionisi 36'; Statella 71'	(Report)	Simpson 58'; Constable 82'

Stadio Santa Colomba, Benevento, Italy

18 November 2008

Wales Semi Pro	0-1	Finland U-23
	(Report)	Petrescu (?)

Stebonheath Park, Llanelli, Wales

=== Final Table ===
Rank	Team	Pld	W	D	L	GF	GA	GD	Pts
1	England C	3	2	1	0	6	3	+3	7
2	Finland U-23	3	2	0	1	3	3	0	6
3	Italy Lega Pro U-21	3	1	1	1	7	6	-1	4
4	Wales Semi Pro	3	0	0	3	3	7	-4	0

== Group B ==
=== Matches ===
13 November 2007

Republic of Ireland U-23	2-0	(Slovenia) Slovakia U-23
Peers 26'; Brennan 33'	(Report)

Dalymount Park, Dublin, Ireland
Referee: Richie Winter

11 December 2007

Belgium U-23	2-1	Northern Ireland U-23
Hubert 58'; Lutun 85'	(Report)	Thompson 46'

Stade Luc Varenne, Tournai, Belgium

25 March 2008

(Slovenia) Slovakia U-23	1-1	Belgium U-23
Škutka 83'	(Report)	Servais 4' (pen.)

Futbalový štadión Prievidza, Prievidza, Slovakia

13 May 2008

Northern Ireland U-23	0-1	Republic of Ireland U-23
	(Report)	Rice 88'

Mourneview Park, Lurgan, Northern Ireland
Referee: Adrian McCourt (Northern Ireland).

21 October 2008

Republic of Ireland U-23	1-2	Belgium U-23
O'Brien 80'	(Report)	Vossen 64'; Hubert 93'

Dalymount Park, Dublin, Ireland
Referee: Marc Douglas (Ireland)

18 November 2008

(Slovenia) Slovakia U-23	1-0	Northern Ireland U-23
Škutka 10'	(Report)

NTC Senec, Senec, Slovakia

=== Final Table ===
Rank	Team	Pld	W	D	L	GF	GA	GD	Pts
1	Belgium U-23	3	2	1	0	5	3	+2	7
2	Republic of Ireland U-23	3	2	0	1	4	2	+2	6
3	(Slovenia) Slovakia U-23	3	1	1	1	2	3	-1	4
4	Northern Ireland U-23	3	0	0	3	1	4	-3	0

== Final ==
19 May 2009

England C	0-1	Belgium U-23
	(Report)	Capon 64'

Kassam Stadium, Oxford, England
Attendance: 2,842
Referee: Mark Whitby (Wales)

Team details

England C
Belgium U-23

GK	Adam Bartlett
DF	Shaun Densmore
DF	Exodus Geohaghon
DF	Darius Charles
MF	Scott Laird	(substituted off) 76'
MF	Russell Penn	(substituted off) 77'
MF	Nicky Wroe
MF	Joel Byrom	(substituted off) 56'
MF	Lee Tomlin
FW	James Constable
FW	Paul Clayton	(substituted off) 69'
Substitutes:
MF	Andrew Fleming	(substituted on) 56'
FW	Liam Hearn	(substituted on) 69'
DF	Sean Newton	(substituted on) 76'
FW	Ishmael Welsh	(substituted on) 77'
Manager:
Paul Fairclough

GK	Simon Mignolet
DF	Miguel Dachelet
DF	Bart Biemans
DF	Geoffrey Cabeke
MF	Ritchie Kitoko	(substituted off) 82'
MF	Vittorio Villano	(substituted off) 89'
MF	Sven Kums
MF	Vadis Odjidja-Ofoe
MF	Radja Nainggolan
FW	Geoffrey Mujangi Bia
FW	Brecht Capon	(substituted off) 82'
Substitutes:
MF	Jan Lella	(substituted on) 82'
FW	Stijn De Wilde	(substituted on) 82'
FW	Hervé Kagé	(substituted on) 89'
Manager:
Unknown

2007–2009 International Challenge Trophy

Belgium
First title

== Statistics ==
=== Goalscorers ===
There were 32 goals scored in 13 matches, for an average of 2.46 goals per match.

2 goals

- (Belgium) David Hubert
- (England) Michael Morrison
- (Italy) Vincenzo Sarno
- (Italy) Federico Dionisi
- (Slovakia) Dávid Škutka

1 goal

- (Belgium) Brecht Capon
- (Belgium) Jelle Vossen
- (Belgium) "Lutun"
- (Belgium) "Servais"
- (England) Danny Simpson
- (England) James Constable
- (England) Matt Tubbs
- (England) Mitchell Cole
- (Finland) Joel Perovuo
- (Finland) Përparim Hetemaj
- (Finland) Tomi Petrescu
- (Italy) Vincenzo Pepe
- (Italy) "Olivieri"
- (Italy) Giuseppe Statella
- (Northern Ireland) Peter Thompson
- (Republic of Ireland) Gavin Peers
- (Republic of Ireland) Killian Brennan
- (Republic of Ireland) Stephen Rice
- (Republic of Ireland) Ger O'Brien
- (Wales) Alex Lawless
- (Wales) David Edwards
- (Wales) "Price"
