= 2011–2013 International Challenge Trophy =

Tournament details
- Dates: 30 November 2011 – 14 August 2013
- Teams: 8

Final positions
- Champions: Turkey (1st title)
- Runners-up: Norway

Tournament statistics
- Matches played: 15
- Goals scored: 45 (3 per match)

The 2011–2013 International Challenge Trophy is the fourth edition of the International Challenge Trophy.

== Group A ==
=== Table ===
Rank	Team	Pld	W	D	L	GF	GA	GD	Pts
1	Russia U-23	3	2	1	0	9	1	+8	7
2	England C	3	1	1	1	2	5	–3	4
3	Italy Lega Pro U-21	3	0	3	0	4	4	0	3
4	Belgium U-23	3	0	1	2	3	8	–5	1

=== Matches ===
30 November 2011

Belgium U-23	2-2	Italy Lega Pro U-21
	(Report)

La Louviere, Belgium

28 February 2012

England C	1-1	Italy Lega Pro U-21
Watkins (90+?)	(Report)	Angiulli 48'

Highbury Stadium, Fleetwood
Attendance: 4,628

5 June 2012

Russia U-23	4-0	England C
(?)	(Report)

Khimky Arena, Moscow

15 August 2012

Russia U-23	4-0	Belgium U-23
Ionov 28' Sapeta 45' (pen.) Panchenko 69' (pen.) Dyadyun 71' (pen.)

KAMAZ, Naberezhnye Chelny

12 September 2012

Belgium U-23	1-2	England C
Naudts 38'	(Report)	Spencer 14' (pen.); Gray 76'

Gemeentalijk Sportstadion, Zaventem

14 November 2012

Italy Lega Pro U-21	1-1	Russia U-23
	(Report)

== Group B ==
=== Table ===
Rank	Team	Pld	W	D	L	GF	GA	GD	Pts
1	Turkey A2	3	2	1	0	11	1	+10	7
2	Norway U-23	3	1	1	1	5	3	+2	4
3	Estonia U-23	3	1	0	2	3	7	–4	3
4	Wales Semi Pro	3	1	0	2	2	10	–8	3

=== Matches ===
5 October 2011
19:00 EEST (UTC+03)

Estonia U-23	1-2	Wales Semi Pro
Dmitrijev 10'	(Report)	Bowen 12'; Jones 62'

Lilleküla Stadium, Tallinn
Attendance: 204
Referee: Dennis Antamo (Finland)

14 November 2011

Turkey A2	1-1	Norway U-23
Sari 23'	(Report)	Abdellaoue 24'

Antalya, Turkey
Attendance: 200
Referee: Jonathan Lardot (Belgium)

29 February 2012
16:00 EET (UTC+02)

Turkey A2	5-0	Estonia U-23
Demir 4'; Köse 18'; Sarı 61', 67'; Güral 62'	(Report)

Adana 5 Ocak Stadium, Adana
Referee: Sandro Schärer (Switzerland)

5 June 2012

Norway U-23	4-0	Wales Semi Pro
Elabdellaoui 18'; Knudtzon 60'; Kleiven 90'; Fellah 90'	(Report)

Mjøndalen Stadion, Mjøndalen, Norway
Attendance: 965
Referee: Bojan Pandzic (Sweden)

16 October 2012

Wales Semi Pro	0-5	Turkey A2
	(Report), (2nd Report)	Yıldırım 45', 53'; Tosun 76', 81'; Yılmaz 82'

Port Talbot, Wales

16 October 2012

Estonia U-23	2-0	Norway U-23
Luts 44'; Kaldoja 63'	(Report)

Lilleküla Stadium, Tallinn, Estonia
Attendance: 175
Referee: Anders Poulsen (Denmark)

== Knock-out stage ==
Semi-finals
5 February
England C	0
Turkey A2	1
7 February
Russia U-23	1
Norway U-23	2

Final
14 August
Norway U-23	0
Turkey A2	1

== Semi-finals ==
5 February 2013
19:45

England C	0–1	Turkey A2
	(Report)	Yılmaz 87'

Princes Park, Dartford
Attendance: 3,212

7 February 2013
19:00

Russia U-23	1-2	Norway U-23
Bibilov 8'	(Report)	Berisha 24'; Pedersen 45'

La Manga Stadium
Attendance: 240
Referee: Denis Higler, (The Netherlands)

== Final ==
14 August 2013

Norway U-23	0–1 (a.e.t.)	Turkey A2
	(Report)	Tosun 112'

Sør Arena, Kristiansand, Norway
Attendance: 1,124
Referee: Marco Di Bello, (Italy)

2011–2013 International Challenge Trophy

Turkey
First title
