= 2009–2011 International Challenge Trophy =

2009–11 International Challenge Trophy
Tournament details
- Dates: 2 December 2009 – 19 May 2011
- Teams: 11

Final positions
- Champions: Portugal (1st title)
- Runners-up: England

Tournament statistics
- Matches played: 18
- Goals scored: 46 (2.56 per match)

The 2009–11 International Challenge Trophy was the third edition of the International Challenge Trophy. Originally, 12 teams were expected to enter the competition. Hungary, however, withdrew before any draw was made. The draw for the competition took place on 28 August 2009 in Dublin. Teams were placed into three groups, two of four teams and one of three. The three group winners and the best runner up then qualified for the semi-finals. Portugal eventually emerged as the winners after defeating England C in the final.

== Group A ==
=== Matches ===
2 December 2009

Malta U-23	1-3	Italy Lega Pro U-21
	(Report)

Malta

31 March 2010

Belgium U-23	1-0	Malta U-23
Danilo 7'	(Report)

Frans Lathouwersstadion, Wolvertem, Belgium
Referee: Erik Lambrechts (Belgium)

10 March 2010

Romania U-23	0-0	Italy Lega Pro U-21
	(Report)

Romania

11 May 2010

Belgium U-23	1-0	Romania U-23
Laleman 74' (pen.)	(Report)

Stade communal de Namur, Namur, Belgium

20 October 2010

Malta U-23	0-4	Romania U-23
	(Report)

Malta

10 November 2010

Italy Lega Pro U-21	4-1	Belgium U-23
	(Report)	Antheunis 18'

Stadio Mario Rigamonti, Brescia, Italy

=== Final table ===
Rank	Team	Pld	W	D	L	GF	GA	GD	Pts
1	Italy Lega Pro U-21	3	2	1	0	7	2	+5	7
2	Belgium U-23	3	2	0	1	3	4	-1	6
3	Romania U-23	3	1	1	1	4	1	-3	4
4	Malta U-23	3	0	0	3	1	8	-7	0

== Group B ==
=== Matches ===
26 May 2010

Republic of Ireland U-23	1-2	England C
Madden 67'	(Report)	Fleming 27'; Porter 63'

Waterford Regional Sports Centre, Ireland
Referee: Alan Kelly (Ireland)

28 September 2010

Estonia U-23	0-1	Republic of Ireland U-23
	(Report)	Williams 42'

Tallinn, Estonia
Referee: Eiko Saar (Estonia)

12 October 2010

Estonia U-23	0-1	England C
	(Report)	Howells (?)

Estonia

=== Final table ===
Rank	Team	Pld	W	D	L	GF	GA	GD	Pts
1	England C	2	2	0	0	3	1	+2	6
2	Republic of Ireland U-23	2	1	0	1	2	2	0	3
3	Estonia U-23	2	0	0	2	0	2	-2	0

== Group C ==
=== Matches ===
10 October 2009

Poland U-23	0-0	Portugal U-23
	(Report)

Poland

24 November 2009

Northern Ireland U-23	2-2	Wales Semi Pro
Magee (?); Fordyce (?)	(Report)

Shamrock Park, Portadown, Northern Ireland

3 March 2010

Portugal U-23	7-2	Wales Semi Pro
Gomes 14'; Ribeiro 31'; Vaz Tê 33', 69'; Machado 56'; Gama 79'; Saleiro 82'		(?) (?)

Estádio Municipal de Fátima, Fátima, Portugal
Referee: Duarte Gomes (Portugal)

11 August 2010

Northern Ireland U-23	2-0	Poland U-23
Owens (?); Donnelly (?)	(Report)

The Showgrounds, Coleraine, Northern Ireland

12 October 2010

Portugal U-23	2-0	Northern Ireland U-23
Orlando Sá 63'; Castro 77'

Municipal Stadium, Cartaxo, Portugal
Referee: Duarte Gomes (Portugal)

13 October 2010

Wales Semi Pro	0-2	Poland U-23
	(Report)

Wales

=== Final table ===
Rank	Team	Pld	W	D	L	GF	GA	GD	Pts
1	Portugal U-23	3	2	1	0	9	2	+7	7
2	Northern Ireland U-23	3	1	1	1	4	4	0	4
3	Poland U-23	3	1	1	1	2	2	0	4
4	Wales Semi Pro	3	0	1	2	4	11	-7	1

== Knock-out stage ==
Semi-finals
9 February
England C	1
Belgium U-23	0
23 March
Italy Lega Pro U-21	2
Portugal U-23	3

Final
19 May
England C	0
Portugal U-23	1

== Semi-finals ==
9 February 2011

England C	1-0	Belgium U-23
Barnes-Homer 7'	(Report)

Kenilworth Road, Luton, England
Attendance: 2,315

23 March 2011

Italy Lega Pro U-21	2-3 (a.e.t.)	Portugal U-23
Falcinelli 10'; Ficarrotta 15'		Orlando Sá 10'; Candeias 86' (pen.); Saleiro 114'

Stadio Polisportivo Provinciale, Erice, Italy
Referee: Stephan Klossner (Switzerland)

== Final ==
19 May 2011

England C	0-1	Portugal U-23
	(Report)	Tavares 63'

Sixfields Stadium, Northampton, England
Attendance: 1,517

Team details

England C
Portugal U-23

GK	Preston Edwards
DF	Lee Vaughan
DF	Connor Franklin	(substituted off) 65'
DF	Rob Atkinson
MF	Max Porter
MF	Michael Wilde	(substituted off) 73'
FW	Andy Mangan
FW	Danny Rose	(substituted off) 81'
FW	George Donnelly
FW	Josh Simpson	(substituted off) 71'
FW	Sean Clancy
Substitutes:
MF	Matty Blair	(substituted on) 65'
FW	Reece Styche	(substituted on) 71'
MF	Josh Coulson	(substituted on) 73'
FW	Jack Byrne	(substituted on) 81'
Manager:
(England) Paul Fairclough

GK	Hugo Ventura
DF	João Gonçalves
DF	Daniel Carriço
DF	Yohan Tavares
MF	Tiago Pinto	(substituted off) 84'
MF	Nuno Coelho
FW	Yannick Djaló	(substituted off) 90'
FW	André Castro	(substituted off) 75'
FW	Carlos Saleiro	(substituted off) 75'
FW	André Santos
FW	Pizzi	(substituted off) 84'
Substitutes:
DF	Yazalde Pinto	(substituted on) 75'
MF	Vítor Gomes	(substituted on) 75'
DF	André Marques	(substituted on) 84'
FW	Daniel Candeias	(substituted on) 84'
MF	Rui Sampaio	(substituted on) 90'
Manager:
(Portugal) ??

2009–2011 International Challenge Trophy

Portugal
First title
