= 2005–06 European Challenge Trophy =

2005-06 European Challenge Trophy
Tournament details
- Dates: 15 November 2005 – 29 November 2006
- Teams: 4
- Venues: 6 (in 6 host cities)

Final positions
- Champions: England (1st title)
- Runners-up: Belgium
- Third place: Netherlands
- Fourth place: Italy

Tournament statistics
- Matches played: 6
- Goals scored: 16 (2.67 per match)
- Top scorer(s): (England) Andy Bishop (England) Craig Mackail-Smith(2 goal each)

The 2005–06 European Challenge Trophy was inaugural edition of the International Challenge Trophy. It was contested by just four teams - England C, Netherlands Amateurs, Belgium U-21 and Italy Lega Pro U-21. Each team played each other once. England C won the competition after winning all three of their games.

== Matches ==
15 November 2005

Belgium U-21	0-2	England C
	(Report)	Andy Bishop 18'; Danny Carey-Bertram 66'

Stade Justin Peeters, Wavre, Belgium
Attendance: 1,500
Referee: Christophe Delacour (Belgium)

30 November 2005

Netherlands Amateurs	2-1	Italy Lega Pro U-21
Anton Jongsma (?); Kevin Vink (?)	(Report)	Francesco Lunardini (?)

FC Lisse, Lisse, Netherlands

15 February 2006

England C	3-1	Italy Lega Pro U-21
Andy Bishop 4'; Chris Blackburn 78'; Craig Mackail-Smith 85'	(Report)	Stefano Ferrario 33'

Abbey Stadium, Cambridge, England

22 February 2006

Netherlands Amateurs	0-2	Belgium U-21
	(Report)	Jeroen Simaeys 55' (pen.); Bjorn Vleminckx 59'

VV SHO, Oud-Beijerland, Netherlands
Referee: Sulimen Ifrandi (Netherlands)

29 November 2006

Italy Lega Pro U-21	0-1	Belgium U-21
	(Report)	Sanchez D'Avolo 8'

Stadio Porta Elisa, Lucca, Italy

29 November 2006

England C	4-1	Netherlands Amateurs
Steve Morison 36' (pen.); Kieran Charnock 40'; George Boyd 72'; Craig Mackail-Smith 77'	(Report)	Thé 5'

Pirelli Stadium, Burton-on-Trent, England

=== Final Table ===
Rank	Team	Pld	W	D	L	GF	GA	GD	Pts
1	England C	3	3	0	0	9	2	+8	9
2	Belgium U-21	3	2	0	1	3	2	+1	6
3	Netherlands Amateurs	3	1	0	2	3	7	–4	3
4	Italy Lega Pro U-21	3	0	0	3	2	6	–5	0

2005–06 European Challenge Trophy

England
First title

== Statistics ==
=== Top goalscorers ===
2 goals

- (England) Andy Bishop
- (England) Craig Mackail-Smith
