= Yohan Tavares =

Portuguese footballer (born 1988)

Personal information
- Date of birth: 2 March 1988 (age 38)
- Place of birth: Tours, France
- Height: 1.88 m (6 ft 2 in)
- Position: Centre-back

Youth career
- 2006–2007: Le Mans

Senior career*
Years	Team	Apps	(Gls)
2007–2008	Le Mans B	13	(0)
2008–2012	Beira-Mar	69	(1)
2010	→ Avanca (loan)	3	(0)
2012–2013	Standard Liège	3	(0)
2013	→ Estoril (loan)	11	(0)
2013–2016	Estoril	88	(0)
2017	Bangkok United	25	(1)
2018	Vitória Setúbal	15	(1)
2018	APOEL	0	(0)
2018–2019	Troyes	32	(0)
2019–2021	Tondela	57	(3)
2021–2022	B-SAD	28	(0)
2022–2026	Laval	101	(0)

International career
2011	Portugal U23	1	(1)
- * Club domestic league appearances and goals as of 12 May 2026

Yohan Tavares (born 2 March 1988) is a professional footballer who plays as a central defender.

Over ten seasons, he amassed Portuguese Primeira Liga totals of 244 matches and five goals for Beira-Mar, Estoril, Vitória de Setúbal, Tondela and B-SAD. He also played in his birth nation, Belgium, Thailand and Cyprus.

Born in France, Tavares represented Portugal at youth level.

== Club career ==
=== Beira-Mar ===
Tavares was born in Tours, France. After an unassuming spell with Le Mans FC – he only appeared officially with the reserve team – he returned to the land of his parents and joined S.C. Beira-Mar, signing a four-year contract following a successful trial period. He suffered a ligament injury to his right knee in December 2008, going on to be sidelined for several months.

In his second season, Tavares contributed 13 games (eight starts) as the Aveiro club returned to the Primeira Liga after three years. He made his debut in the competition on 15 August 2010 in a 0–0 home draw against U.D. Leiria, and finished the campaign with 21 matches, scoring in a 1–1 home draw with Rio Ave F.C. as his team finally ranked 13th, out of the relegation zone.

=== Standard Liège ===
In the 2012 summer transfer window, Tavares signed with Standard Liège of the Belgian Pro League for a reported fee of €2 million, agreeing to a three-year deal. He made the first of only three competitive appearances for his new team on 30 September, playing the full 90 minutes in a 2–1 away loss to K.V. Kortrijk.

=== Estoril ===
On 26 July 2013, after having spent the latter part of the season on loan at the club, and after having cancelled his contract with A.C. ChievoVerona, Tavares joined G.D. Estoril Praia on a three-year deal. He started in all his league matches during his spell at the Estádio António Coimbra da Mota, and added 16 in the UEFA Europa League, his first being on 1 August 2013 in a 0–0 home draw against Hapoel Ramat Gan Givatayim F.C. in the third qualifying round– his only goal took place on 23 October of the following year, in a 1–2 group stage defeat to FC Dynamo Moscow.

=== Later career ===
On 21 November 2016, free agent Tavares moved to the Thai League 1 with Bangkok United FC. After a three-month stint back in his country with Vitória de Setúbal, he signed with Cypriot club APOEL FC on 23 May 2018.

Tavares returned to his native France ten years after leaving, joining Troyes AC of Ligue 2 for two seasons. He left after only one, however, moving back to Portugal and its top division with C.D. Tondela.

On 30 August 2021, Tavares signed a one-year contract with B-SAD of the same league. The following July, having been relegated, the 34-year-old returned to the French second tier with Stade Lavallois.

== International career ==
In January 2008, Tavares was called up for a four-day training camp with the France under-21 futsal team. On 19 May 2011, during the final of the International Challenge Trophy against England C played in Northampton, he celebrated his debut for the Portugal under-23 side by scoring the game's only goal.

== Career statistics ==
As of match played on 5 January 2019

Club statistics
Club	Season	League			National Cup		League Cup		Continental		Total	
Club	Season	Division	Apps	Goals	Apps	Goals	Apps	Goals	Apps	Goals	Apps	Goals
Le Mans B	2007–08	Championnat National 2	13	0	—		—		—		13	0
Beira-Mar	2008–09	Segunda Liga	11	0	3	0	1	0	—		15	0
Beira-Mar	2009–10	Segunda Liga	13	0	0	0	3	0	—		16	0
Beira-Mar	2010–11	Primeira Liga	21	1	4	0	3	0	—		28	1
Beira-Mar	2011–12	Primeira Liga	24	0	1	0	0	0	—		25	0
Beira-Mar	Total		69	1	8	0	7	0	—		84	1
Avanca (loan)	2009–10	Segunda Divisão	3	0	0	0	—		—		3	0
Standard Liège	2012–13	Belgian Pro League	3	0	0	0	—		—		3	0
Estoril (loan)	2012–13	Primeira Liga	11	0	0	0	0	0	—		11	0
Estoril	2013–14	Primeira Liga	28	0	4	0	2	1	10 (Note: Appearances in UEFA Europa League)	0	44	1
Estoril	2014–15	Primeira Liga	30	0	1	0	2	0	6	1	39	1
Estoril	2015–16	Primeira Liga	30	0	4	0	1	0	—		35	0
Estoril	Total		88	0	9	0	5	1	16	1	118	2
Bangkok United	2017	Thai League T1	25	1	0	0	—		—		25	1
Vitória Setúbal	2017–18	Primeira Liga	15	1	0	0	0	0	—		15	1
APOEL	2018–19	Cypriot First Division	0	0	0	0	—		4	1	4	1
Troyes	2018–19	Ligue 2	13	0	0	0	1	0	0	0	14	0
Career total			240	3	17	0	13	1	20	2	290	6

== Honours ==
Beira-Mar

- Segunda Liga: 2009–10
