= Scotland national semi-professional football team =

National association football team

Scotland Semi-Pro
- Association: Scottish Football Association

The Scotland national semi-professional football team was a football team that represented Scotland. The Scotland semi-professional team competed in the Four Nations Tournament and was organised by the Scottish Football Association (SFA). The team was disbanded in 2008, when the SFA board decided to stop providing the finance needed for the team to operate. At the time the team was disbanded, players in the three senior non-leagues, the East of Scotland Football League, Highland Football League and South of Scotland Football League, were eligible for selection.

== History ==
The semi-pro team was first formed in the late 1970s. The first incarnation of the team was originally made of players from Scottish Football League clubs outside the Premier Division. The most recent incarnation of the team (1990s and 2000s) was made of players selected from two of the three former senior non leagues in Scotland; the Highland League and the East of Scotland League. The third senior non league was the South of Scotland League, which had not had a select side for long time, hampering scouting and selection, which coupled with friction over travel issues effectively saw what few players of calibre they had excluded.

The semi-pro team regularly played friendlies against a Highland League Select. They also regularly played preparation games against Scottish Football League clubs prior to international tournaments in the 1980s. The team was disbanded by the Scottish FA in November 2008. The Scottish FA decided to withdraw funding for the semi-professional side in order to save money, more than £20,000 worth of funding was pulled.

=== Four Nations Tournament ===
There was no officially sanctioned competition by either UEFA or FIFA for national teams at non-league level, but Scotland competed in the annual Four Nations Semi-Pro Tournament between 1979 and 2008. The competition was abandoned from 1988 to 2001, while no competition took place in 1986. The first eight editions of the tournament (1979–1987) saw Scotland compete against England Semi-Pro, Netherlands Amateurs and Italy Serie C U-21s. The later reinstatement of the competition saw the semi-pro teams of Scotland, England, Wales and Republic of Ireland compete from 2002 to 2008. The Gibraltar national team replaced Ireland in the last edition. Scotland last hosted the Four Nations Tournament in 2007, when matches were played in Dingwall, Inverness and Brora. Scotland withdrew from the competition after 2008.

- 1979 Third-Place
- 1980 Winners
- 1981 Third-Place
- 1982 Winners
- 1983 Runners-Up
- 1984 Fourth-Place
- 1985 Winners
- 1986 no competition
- 1987 Third-Place
- 1988-2001 no competition
- 2002 Fourth-Place
- 2003 Runners-Up
- 2004 Runners-Up
- 2005 Runners-Up
- 2006 Third-Place
- 2007 Third-Place
- 2008 Third-Place

=== Tournament Managers ===
Year	Manager	Ref
1979		
1980		
1981	Pat Stanton of Dunfermline Athletic	
1982	Pat Stanton of Dunfermline Athletic	
1983		
1984	Peter Cormack of Partick Thistle	
1985	Terry Christie of Meadowbank Thistle	
1987	Ross Mathie	

== Other matches ==
#	Date	Venue	Att.	Score	Scotland goalscorers	Ref.
1	11 May 1981	Kingsmill Park (A)	Highland League XI	3–1	Morris (48, 88), Morton (51)	
2	19 May 1982	East End Park (A)	Fife FA XI	0–1		
