= Whaddon Road =

Football stadium in Cheltenham, England

Coordinates: 51°54′22″N 2°3′37″W

- Whaddon Road
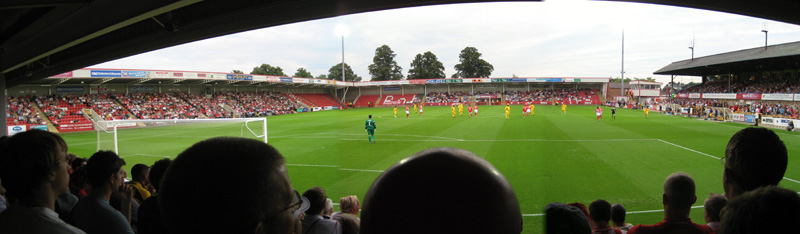
- Interactive map of Whaddon Road
- Full name: Whaddon Stadium
- Capacity: 7,066
- Field size: 111 x 72 yards

Construction
- Built: 1927
- Opened: 1927

Tenants
- Cheltenham Town (1932–present); Gloucester City (2010–2017)

Whaddon Road, known as the EV Charger Points Stadium for sponsorship reasons, is a football stadium in Cheltenham, England. It is the home ground of Cheltenham Town F.C. It has a total capacity of 7,066, with a mixture of seating and terracing. The ground's official name was the Victory Sports Ground until April 2009 when it was renamed the Abbey Business Stadium through a sponsorship deal. It was announced on 13 July 2015 that the club had agreed a three-year deal to rename the stadium The World of Smile Stadium, but the deal ended after only one year and the stadium was renamed LCI Rail Stadium in 2016–17, before being named Jonny-Rocks Stadium in 2018–19, and Completely-Suzuki Stadium in 2022.

== History ==
The stadium, on the site of what was the Berkeley Hunt kennels, was built by the Cheltenham Original Brewery in 1927 and has been the home of Cheltenham Town since 1932, although it did not host senior football for 67 years. Cheltenham marked their 70th anniversary at the stadium by winning promotion to the Football League Second Division, the third tier of English football, for the first time.

The record attendance is 8,326, at a game versus Reading, FA Cup 1st Round, 17 November 1956. Whaddon Road was the smallest League One stadium in the 2007–08 and 2008–09 season.

== Stands ==
Hazlewoods Stand (then the Carlsberg Stand) and Colin Farmer Stand (then the In2Print Stand), in 2011

The ground is made up of 4 stands:

- Hazlewoods Stand (Whaddon Road) – capacity approx 1,100. An all-seated stand behind one of the goals, initially named the Carlsberg Stand, it was opened in 2005 and is designated for away fans. For the 2009–10 season it was given to home supporters, but after one season it was returned to away fans.
- Colin Farmer Stand (Wymans Road) – capacity approx 2,000. An all-seated stand that runs down one side of the pitch. The stand was opened in November 2001 and is home to the vocal "1887 Red Army" supporters, who are situated in block 1. For big games, two sections of the stand are given to away supporters. It was renamed the Colin Farmer Stand at the beginning of the 2016–17 season, in memory of Colin Farmer, a former director of the club for many years.
- Farrar and Tanner Stand (Prestbury Road End) – capacity approx 2,000. Given a roof in 2000–01, this is now a covered terrace and is the home standing end.
- Autovillage Stand (Main Stand) – capacity approx 1,600. Built in 1963, it is a mixture of terracing (Tunnel and Paddock enclosures) at the front and seating at the back. The Main Stand runs down one side of the pitch, but is unusual in that it does not stretch the full length of the touchline and does not reach either corner flag. It contains the players dressing rooms, and hospitality, directors' and press boxes. The Family Section is located in Block C of this stand.

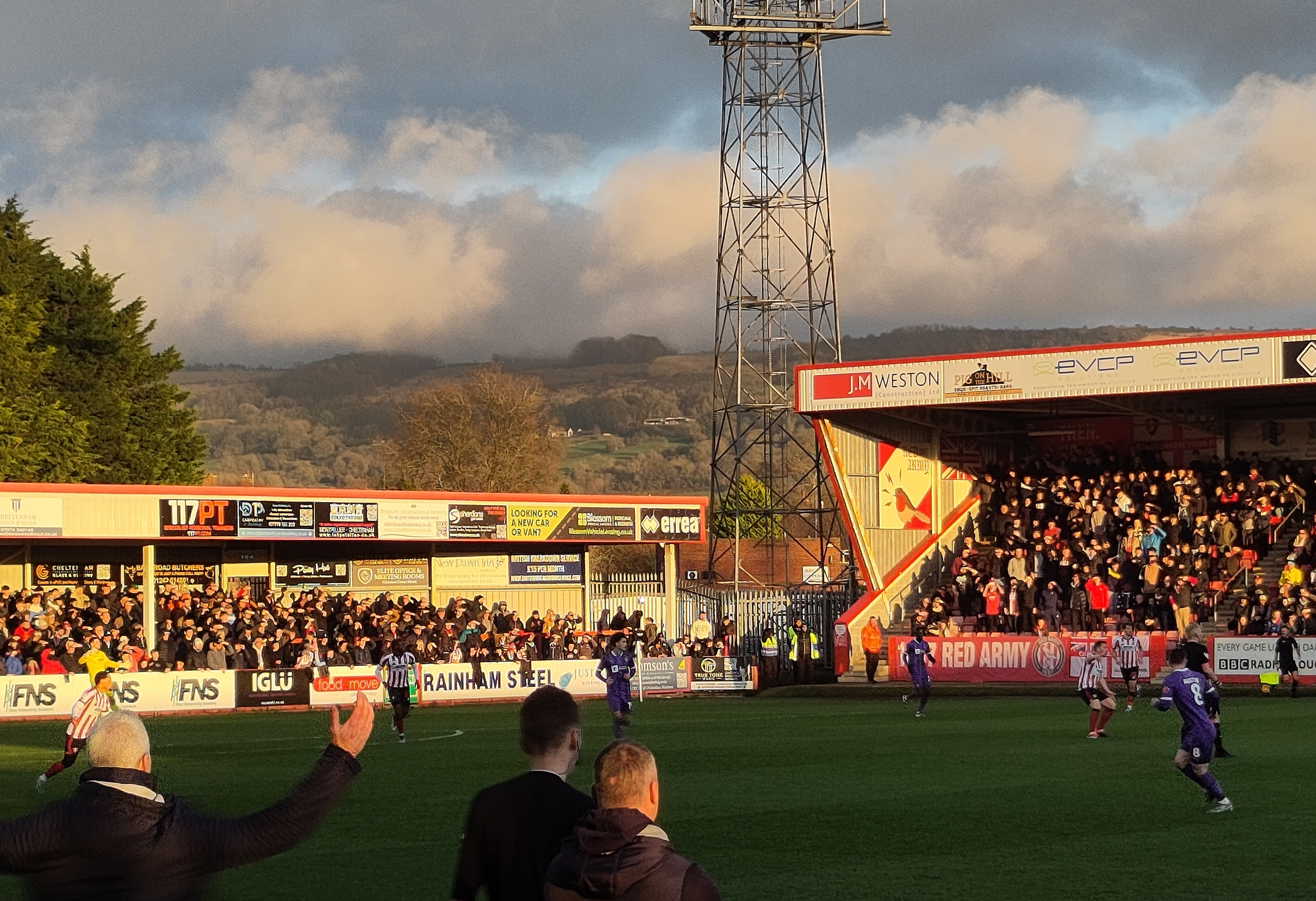
View from Paddock towards Optimising IT Stand (on the left) with Cleeve Hill in the background 2024-25 season.

== Other teams ==
Other teams to have used Whaddon Road as a home venue are:

- Gloucester City A.F.C.
- St Mark's
- Endsleigh
- Cheltenham Original Brewery

The ground is also used as the venue for many local league and youth cup finals.

== International games ==
The stadium has been used for the following international games:

- 28 January 1939: England Amateur Vs Wales Amateur (5–2)
- 2 March 1993: England semi-pro Vs Wales Semi-Pro (2–1)
- 4 September 2005: England Under-17 Vs Italy Under-17 (1–2)
- 27 October 2011: England Under-16 Vs Wales Under-16 (4–0)

== Sources ==
- Football Ground Guide
