= James Norwood =

English footballer (born 1990)

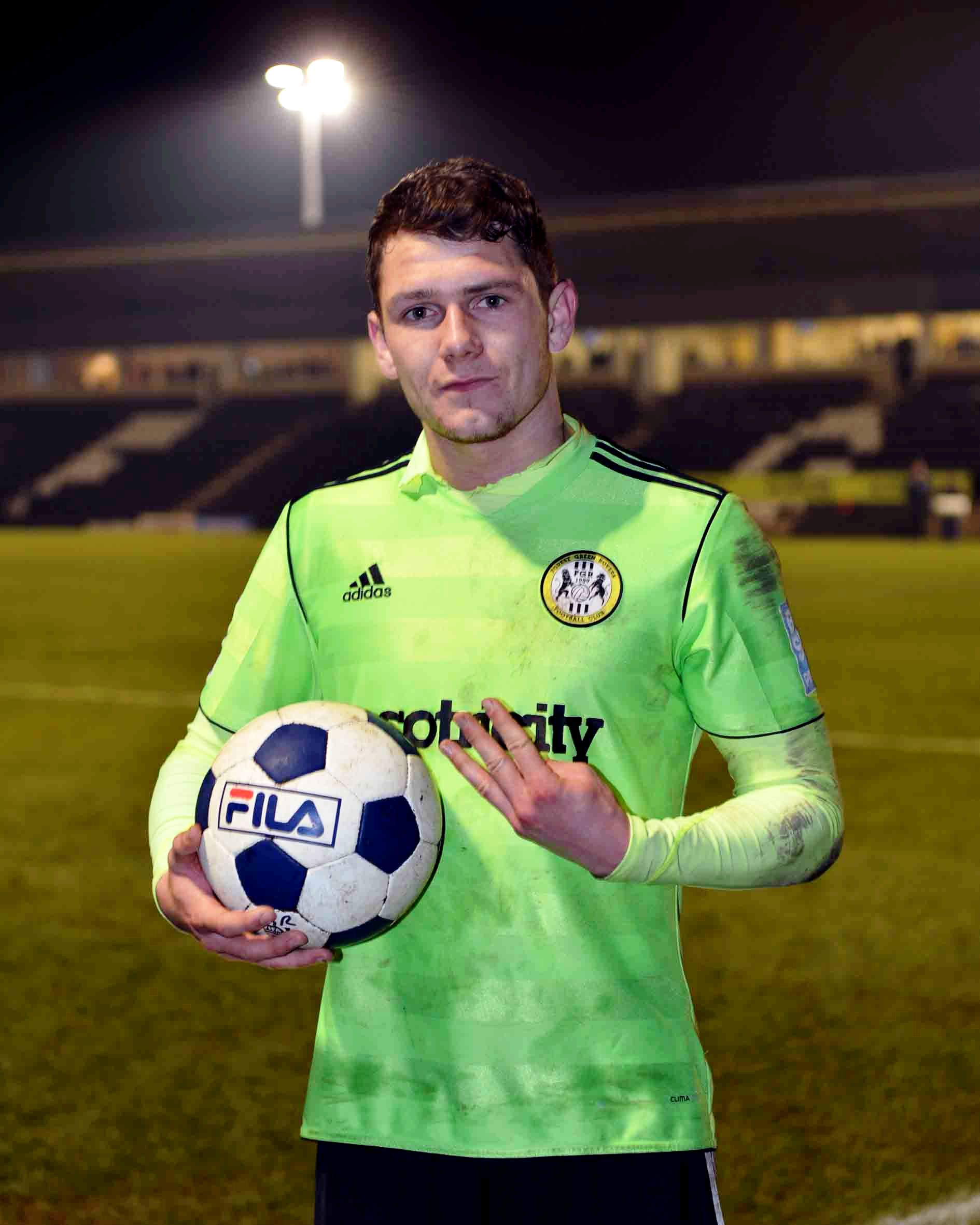
- Norwood celebrating a hat-trick for Forest Green Rovers in 2013

Personal information
- Full name: James Thomas Norwood
- Date of birth: 5 September 1990 (age 36)
- Place of birth: Eastbourne, England
- Height: 5 ft 10 in (1.78 m)
- Position: Striker

Team information
- Current team: Scunthorpe United
- Number: 9

Youth career
- 1996–2002: Old Town Boys
- 2002–2004: Brighton & Hove Albion
- 2004–2005: Crystal Palace
- 2005–2009: Eastbourne Town

Senior career*
Years	Team	Apps	(Gls)
2008–2009	Eastbourne Town	16	(8)
2009–2011	Exeter City	4	(0)
2009–2010	→ Sutton United (loan)	12	(3)
2010	→ Forest Green Rovers (loan)	11	(2)
2011	→ Eastbourne Borough (loan)	4	(0)
2011–2015	Forest Green Rovers	161	(48)
2015–2019	Tranmere Rovers	165	(81)
2019–2022	Ipswich Town	77	(26)
2022–2023	Barnsley	42	(12)
2023–2025	Oldham Athletic	65	(26)
2025–2026	Fleetwood Town	18	(2)
2026–	Scunthorpe United	6	(3)

International career
2009	England Schools U18	4	(1)
2013–2015	England C	7	(4)
- * Club domestic league appearances and goals as of 19:34, 14 October 2026 (UTC)

James Thomas Norwood (born 5 September 1990) is an English professional footballer who plays as a striker for National League club Scunthorpe United.

He started his career with Eastbourne Town, making eighteen senior appearances before signing for Exeter City in July 2009. Two years later, in June 2011, he joined Forest Green Rovers, who he left in May 2015 to join Tranmere Rovers and later Ipswich Town in 2019. He signed for Barnsley in July 2022 on a one-year deal.

Norwood also represented England Schools in 2009, making his debut on 5 March against Wales in the Carnegie Centenary Shield. He scored his first goal against France on 13 June 2009.

== Club career ==
=== Early career ===
Born in Eastbourne, East Sussex, Norwood played for Brighton & Hove Albion and Crystal Palace youth teams. He later represented, Eastbourne Town youth, St Bede's School and England Schools as a youth player in the 2008–09 season. Later in that same season, he played for Eastbourne Town's senior side despite still being at school, making eighteen appearances for the Isthmian League Division One South club, scoring ten goals.

In April 2009, he won the English Schools FA Trophy with St Bedes. He made his debut for England Schools on 5 March, against Wales in the Carnegie Centenary Shield. In June 2009, Norwood represented England Schools again in their 4–2 defeat against France at Wembley Stadium.

=== Exeter City ===
John Yems handed Norwood a trial with Exeter City during their 2009–10 pre-season campaign along with nine other players. Following the successful trial, he signed for the club on 25 July 2009. His move was helped with funding from a branch of the Exeter City Supporters' Trust called the 1931 Fund, which was created with the intention of signing players. Members of the fund each pay £19 per month towards his wages. Norwood made his debut in Exeter City's 2–1 defeat away to Leeds United in League One on 8 August, the opening day of the 2009–10 season. He replaced Marcus Stewart as a substitute in the 70th minute. Exeter manager Paul Tisdale commented on his debut saying; "It's remarkable that James should be on the field after only joining us a few weeks ago. He put in a really good 20 minutes and he showed some real touches of know-how, there's a bright future for him." Norwood joined Isthmian League Premier Division club Sutton United on a one-month loan deal starting on 21 November 2009, which was extended into January 2010 for another month. Norwood scored his first goal for Sutton on 12 December 2009 against Kingstonian.

In August 2010, he joined Conference Premier club Forest Green Rovers on a one-month loan deal. Norwood impressed in his first month with Forest Green and the loan deal was extended for a further period. He scored his first goal for Forest Green in a 4–3 loss against Eastbourne Borough. Norwood returned to Exeter in October.

On 31 December 2010, he joined Eastbourne Borough on loan. He made his debut for the club the next day, playing the entire match against Crawley Town.

In May 2011 Exeter announced that he would not be offered a new deal at the end of the season.

=== Forest Green Rovers ===
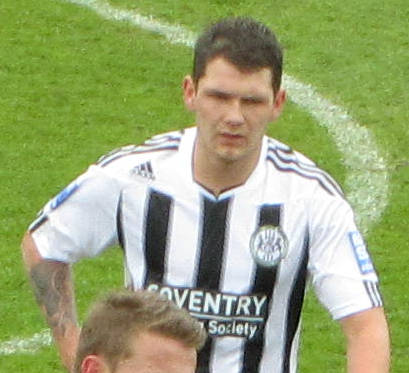
Norwood playing for Forest Green Rovers in 2012

Norwood joined Forest Green Rovers on a permanent deal in June 2011. In October 2011, Norwood had surgery on his hernia which ruled him out of action for a month. Norwood returned from his injury as a second-half substitute on 26 November 2011 against York City and scored a last minute equaliser to earn Forest Green a draw. He scored his first hat-trick for Forest Green on 1 January 2013 in a 5–0 away win at Rodney Parade against Newport County.

On 11 February 2013, Norwood signed a new two-year extension to his contract at Forest Green, a move that would see him tied down to the club for up to the summer of 2015. He scored his second hat-trick for Forest Green on 12 February 2013 in a 4–1 win against Braintree Town. An impressive 2012–13 campaign for Norwood saw him earn the Player's Player of the Year award at the end of the season and a call up to the England C squad for the first time for an international with Bermuda. He made his hundredth league appearance for Forest Green on 21 September 2013 in a defeat against Cambridge United. He ended the 2013–14 season as the club's top goal scorer for a second consecutive season with 19 goals. He scored his first goal of the 2014–15 campaign in a 1–1 draw at Welling United on 30 August 2014. His brace in a man of the match performance on 1 November 2014 against Lincoln City helped inspire Forest Green to a 3–3 draw after Lincoln had led 3–0 with less than half an hour to go.

On 7 February 2015, he came off the bench to score the winning goal in a 2–1 win over Grimsby Town which saw him overtake Yan Klukowski in becoming Forest Green's all-time top Conference Premier goal scorer. He helped Forest Green to the Conference Premier play-offs for the first time in the club's history, although they were knocked out in the semi-finals in May 2015 by Bristol Rovers. A day after Forest Green's play-off defeat it was confirmed that he would be leaving the club.

=== Tranmere Rovers ===
On 13 May 2015, Norwood signed a two-year contract with Tranmere Rovers following his release from Forest Green. Norwood's opening weeks with Tranmere were dogged by injury issues but he finally found the net for the first time against rivals Chester in mid-September. Norwood had netted nine times for Rovers come the turn of the year, including a looping header in a 2–0 victory against former club Forest Green and Tranmere's eventual goal of the season in a 4–1 away defeat at Woking. Despite Norwood averaging a goal every other game across his 38 league appearances in 2015–16, Tranmere finished in 6th place, narrowly missing out on the National League play-off spots.

Norwood's second season at Tranmere got off to a flyer, scoring four goals in the opening three games of the season including a dramatic injury time winner at home to Eastleigh. However, this purple patch did not last long with Norwood managing just one goal from the next eight games, the final of these games being a 1–0 defeat away at Sutton United, Tranmere manager Gary Brabin, the man who brought Norwood to Prenton Park, was sacked following the defeat. Between September and mid-April, as Tranmere battled for top-spot with Lincoln City, Norwood netted six times. In mid-December, with his contract due to expire at the end of the season, Norwood signed a two-and-a-half-year contract extension, keeping him at Prenton Park until June 2019. Norwood finished the 2016–17 season strongly with 5 goals in as many games including one in each leg of the play-off semi final against Aldershot. The only game of the final five that Norwood didn't score in was the National League play-off final which ended in a 3–1 defeat for Tranmere.

The 2017–18 season would turn out to be Norwood's most successful season yet. Norwood and Tranmere suffered a torrid start to the season, Tranmere languished in the bottom half of the National League and at one point dropped to their lowest ever league position. Norwood managed just one goal from his opening nine games and was sent off in the first of these for an elbow against Torquay. Norwood finished the season with 24 goals and 11 assists in all competitions, this was good enough to finish 3rd top scorer in the National League, the top scorer being Norwood's strike partner Andy Cook. Two of these goals came in the play-off semi-final versus Ebbsfleet, the first being a clinical left footed finish into the far-bottom corner and the second being a curling 25-yard extra time free-kick that put Tranmere 3–2 up. On 12 May 2018, almost three years to the day of his arrival at Tranmere, Norwood scored the winning goal in the play-off final against Boreham Wood at Wembley to ensure the club's return to the EFL after a three-year absence.

Norwood finished 2018–19 season as the joint top goal scorer in English football with 32 goals in all competitions, along with Manchester City's Sergio Agüero, as Tranmere won promotion to League One after beating Newport County 1–0 at Wembley in the 2019 League Two play-off final, following a 6th-place finish in League Two. His excellent form also saw him win the League Two Player of the Year award at the EFL Awards, as well as winning a place in the PFA League Two Team of the Year.

=== Ipswich Town ===
==== 2019–20 season ====
Norwood joined Ipswich Town on 10 June 2019 on a free transfer, signing a three-year contract, with the option for a further year. He made his debut for the club on 3 August 2019, in a 1–0 win over Burton Albion on the opening day of the 2019–20 season. He scored his first goal for the club in a 2–2 draw with Peterborough United, on 17 August 2019. He scored five goals in six matches during the first month of the 2019–20 season, including a brace in a 5–0 away win over Bolton Wanderers at the University of Bolton Stadium. His form over the course of his first month at Portman Road earned him the PFA Fans' League One Player of the Month award for August. Norwood reached double figures for the 2019–20 season on 11 January 2020, netting his 10th league goal of the season in a 4–1 win over Accrington Stanley. On 21 February 2020, Norwood underwent surgery on his adductor, putting him out until April. However, due to the season being suspended in March and ultimately not restarting due to the COVID-19 pandemic, he made no further appearances for the rest of the season. He ended the season having scored 11 goals in 28 appearances, finishing as the club's joint top goalscorer.

==== 2020–21 season ====
On 1 October 2020, Ipswich announced that Norwood had suffered a torn hamstring in training and that he would be set for a spell on the sidelines, with the injury expected to keep him out of action for at least six weeks. Norwood made his return from injury earlier that expected, coming on as a second-half substitute and scoring in a 3–2 loss to Portsmouth in an FA Cup tie on 7 November. He suffered a repeat of his previous hamstring injury in a match against Charlton Athletic on 28 November. He returned to the first-team on 9 January 2021, coming off the bench to score and get an assist in a 3–2 loss to Swindon Town. He continued his goal scoring form during February, scoring the winning goal in a 1–0 away win over Hull City on 23 February, before scoring in the following league game in a 2–1 home win against Doncaster Rovers. On 1 May 2021, Norwood captained the club for the first time, netting two goals in a 2–1 win against Swindon Town. He finished the season as the club's top goalscorer for the second season in a row, scoring ten goals in all competitions.

==== 2021–22 season ====
Despite remaining at the club following a summer in which more than 12 players departed and 19 were signed, Norwood initially made very few appearances during the 2021–22 season. In November, it was reported that Norwood had been told he had no future at the club and was told to train with the club's under-23s. However, Norwood returned to the first team in December and scored his first league goal of the season upon his return on 11 December 2021 in a 1–1 draw against Wigan Athletic. He went on to score in his following two appearances that month and was subsequently named Ipswich Player of the Month for December.

His 88th and final appearance for the club came a few days prior on 30 April, when he scored Ipswich's fourth goal (and his 28th for the club overall) in a 4–0 win against Charlton Athletic.On 5 May 2022, Ipswich confirmed that Norwood would leave the club following his contract's expiration.

=== Oldham Athletic ===
On 3 August 2023, Norwood joined National League side Oldham Athletic for an undisclosed fee on a two-year deal, reuniting with former Tranmere Rovers manager Micky Mellon.

On 1 June 2025, Norwood scored his side's second equaliser as the Latics defeated Southend United 3–2 in extra-time of the 2025 National League play-off final.

=== Fleetwood Town ===
On 18 July 2025, Norwood joined fellow League Two side Fleetwood Town on a one-year deal. He made his debut for the club on 2 August 2025, in a 2–0 win against Barnet. He scored his first goal for the club on 16 August 2025, in a 2–2 draw with Bromley.

On 15 May 2026, Fleetwood announced he would be leaving in the summer when his contract expired.

=== Scunthorpe United ===
On 26 September 2026, Norwood signed a short-term deal with National League side Scunthorpe United.

== International career ==
Norwood experienced his first taste of representing his country in March 2009 for the England Schools squad in a Carnegie Centenary Shield fixture against Wales. He would later go on to play at Wembley Stadium against France, scoring in a 4–2 defeat.

He made his England C team debut on 4 June 2013, coming on as a half time substitute and scoring a hat-trick against Bermuda at the Bermuda National Stadium. He earned his second cap for the England C squad against the Latvia under-23 national side on 10 September 2013 in Jelgava, suffering a 1–0 defeat. He scored a last minute penalty on 19 November 2013 in a friendly with the Czech Republic under 21s squad to earn England a 2–2 draw at Woking's Kingfield. On 4 March 2014, he earned his fourth cap in a friendly against the Jordan under-23 squad in Amman which saw England C pick up a 1–0 win.

Norwood's fifth international cap came in his first competitive game for the England C side as he started in a 1–0 away defeat against Slovakia in England's International Challenge Trophy opening group fixture. His next appearance for the England C side, in October 2014 in an away tie against Turkey, saw him captain his country for the first time. On 4 February 2015, alongside teammate Elliott Frear, he was called up to the England C squad for a friendly with the Cyprus under 21 set-up later that month.

== Personal life ==
Norwood attended St Bede's School in Hailsham, who he represented playing football and rugby. He was captain of his school football side and also won a national under-12 rugby title with St Bede's in 2003.

Norwood supports Eastbourne Town and is often seen at The Saffrons, where he hopes to play "once the legs give in".

== Career statistics ==
As of match played 28 March 2026

Appearances and goals by club, season and competition
Club	Season	League			FA Cup		League Cup		Other		Total	
Club	Season	Division	Apps	Goals	Apps	Goals	Apps	Goals	Apps	Goals	Apps	Goals
Eastbourne Town	2007–08	IL Division One South	2	0	0	0	—		0	0	2	0
Eastbourne Town	2008–09	IL Division One South	14	8	1	1	—		3 (Note: One appearance in FA Trophy, one appearance and one goal in Isthmian League Cup, one appearance in Sussex Senior Cup)	1	18	10
Eastbourne Town	Total		16	8	1	1	0	0	3	1	20	10
Exeter City	2009–10	League One	3	0	0	0	1	0	0	0	4	0
Exeter City	2010–11	League One	1	0	0	0	0	0	0	0	1	0
Exeter City	Total		4	0	0	0	1	0	0	0	5	0
Sutton United (loan)	2009–10	IL Premier Division	12	3	0	0	—		1 (Note: Appearance in Surrey Senior Cup)	0	13	3
Forest Green Rovers (loan)	2010–11	Conference Premier	11	2	0	0	—		0	0	11	2
Eastbourne Borough (loan)	2010–11	Conference Premier	4	0	0	0	—		1 (Note: Appearance(s) in FA Trophy)	0	5	0
Forest Green Rovers	2011–12	Conference Premier	38	3	0	0	—		2	0	40	3
Forest Green Rovers	2012–13	Conference Premier	41	15	3	2	—		2	0	46	17
Forest Green Rovers	2013–14	Conference Premier	45	19	0	0	—		4	0	49	19
Forest Green Rovers	2014–15	Conference Premier	37	11	2	2	—		3 (Note: One appearance in FA Trophy, two appearances in Conference Premier play-offs)	0	42	13
Forest Green Rovers	Total		161	48	5	4	—		11	0	177	52
Tranmere Rovers	2015–16	National League	38	19	2	0	—		1	2	41	21
Tranmere Rovers	2016–17	National League	40	13	0	0	—		8 (Note: Five appearances in FA Trophy, three appearances and two goals in National League play-offs)	2	48	15
Tranmere Rovers	2017–18	National League	42	20	3	1	—		3 (Note: One appearance in FA Trophy, two appearances and three goals in National League play-offs)	3	48	24
Tranmere Rovers	2018–19	League Two	45	29	5	2	0	0	3 (Note: Appearances in League Two play-offs)	1	53	32
Tranmere Rovers	Total		165	81	10	3	0	0	15	8	190	92
Ipswich Town	2019–20	League One	28	11	2	0	0	0	2 (Note: Appearance(s) in EFL Trophy)	0	32	11
Ipswich Town	2020–21	League One	26	9	1	1	1	0	1	0	29	10
Ipswich Town	2021–22	League One	23	6	1	0	1	0	2	1	27	7
Ipswich Town	Total		77	26	4	1	2	0	5	1	88	28
Barnsley	2022–23	League One	42	12	2	0	1	0	4 (Note: One appearance in EFL Trophy, three appearances in League One play-offs)	0	49	12
Oldham Athletic	2023–24	National League	40	17	2	0	—		2	1	44	18
Oldham Athletic	2024–25	National League	25	9	3	1	—		3 (Note: Appearances in National League play-offs)	1	31	11
Oldham Athletic	Total		65	26	5	1	—		5	2	75	29
Fleetwood Town	2025–26	League Two	18	2	1	0	1	0	4	4	24	6
Career total			575	208	28	10	5	0	49	16	657	234

== Honours ==
Tranmere Rovers

- National League play-offs: 2018
- EFL League Two play-offs: 2019

Oldham Athletic

- National League play-offs: 2025

Individual

- Forest Green Rovers Players' Player of the Year: 2012–13
- Conference Premier Team of the Year: 2013–14
- Tranmere Rovers Player of the Year: 2015–16, 2018–19
- Tranmere Rovers Players' Player of the Year: 2018–19
- EFL League Two Player of the Month: August 2018
- EFL League Two Player of the Year: 2018–19
- EFL League Two top scorer: 2018–19
- EFL Football League Two Team of the Season: 2018–19
- EFL Team of the Season: 2018–19
- PFA Team of the Year: 2018–19 League Two
- PFA Fans' League One Player of the Month: August 2019, December 2021
