= Four Nations Tournament (1979–2008) =

- Founded: 1979
- Abolished: 2008
- Region: Europe
- Number of teams: 4
- Most successful club(s): England semi-pro national team (7 titles)

The Four Nations Tournament was an annual football competition in Europe contested by semi-professional national teams. England were the most successful side with seven wins and they won the last edition in 2008.

The original competition was held between 1979 and 1987 (featuring England, Scotland, Italy and the Netherlands). The tournament returned between 2002 and 2008 after a hiatus (featuring England, Republic of Ireland, replaced by Gibraltar in 2008, Scotland and Wales). The revived competition was played at the end of the British domestic football season.

== History ==
From 1979 to 1987 it was known as Torneo delle Quattro Nazioni per Rappresentative di Lega, and was originally competed for by Scotland Semi-Pro, England Semi-Pro, Netherlands Amateurs and Italy Serie C U-21s. The tournament was cancelled in 1986 and was scrapped from 1988 to 2001.

When the tournament returned in 2002, the semi-pro teams of England, Ireland, Scotland and Wales competed. The Gibraltar full national team replaced Ireland in 2008.

The tournament was won seven times by England, three times by Wales and Scotland, and twice by Italy.

The 2009 tournament was supposed to be held in England. There were rumours of a Scotland withdrawal and in turn being replaced by a Northern Ireland semi professional team. Scotland withdrew from the competition altogether and the team was disbanded in November 2008 because of a lack of funding. Gibraltar also decided against returning in 2009. This left only two teams signed up for the 2009 competition. The 2008 tournament was in fact the last edition.

=== Format ===
The first tournament consisted of two semi-finals, a final and a third/fourth play-off. Every other tournament was a group stage with each national side playing each other once in a round robin format. The competition was always hosted as a one-off tournament by one of the competing nations, usually the competition was stage by each competing national side within a period of every four years.

== Winners ==
| Year | Winner | Second | Third | Fourth |
|---|---|---|---|---|
| (England) 1979 | England Semi-Pro | Holland Amateurs | Italy Serie C U-21 | Scotland Semi-Pro |
| (Netherlands) 1980 | Scotland Semi-Pro | England Semi-Pro | Italy Serie C U-21 | Holland Amateurs |
| (Italy) 1981 | England Semi-Pro | Italy Serie C U-21 | Scotland Semi-Pro | Holland Amateurs |
| (Scotland) 1982 | Scotland Semi-Pro | England Semi-Pro | Holland Amateurs | Italy Serie C U-21 |
| (England) 1983 | England Semi-Pro | Scotland Semi-Pro | Holland Amateurs | Italy Serie C U-21 |
| (Italy) 1984 | Italy Serie C U-21 | England Semi-Pro | Holland Amateurs | Scotland Semi-Pro |
| (Netherlands) 1985 | Scotland Semi-Pro | England Semi-Pro | Italy Serie C U-21 | Holland Amateurs |
| (Scotland) 1986 | Competition cancelled | | | |
| (Scotland) 1987 | Italy Serie C U-21 | England Semi-Pro | Scotland Semi-Pro | Holland Amateurs |
| 1988–2001 | No competition held | | | |
| (England) 2002 | Wales Semi-Pro | Rep of Ireland Semi-Pro | England Semi-Pro | Scotland Semi-Pro |
| (Wales) 2003 | England Semi-Pro | Scotland Semi-Pro | Rep of Ireland Semi-Pro | Wales Semi-Pro |
| (Scotland) 2004 | Wales Semi-Pro | Scotland Semi-Pro | England Semi-Pro | Rep of Ireland Semi-Pro |
| (Republic of Ireland) 2005 | England Semi-Pro | Scotland Semi-Pro | Wales Semi-Pro | Rep of Ireland Semi-Pro |
| (England) 2006 | Wales Semi-Pro | England Semi-Pro | Rep of Ireland Semi-Pro | Scotland Semi-Pro |
| (Scotland) 2007 | England Semi-Pro | Wales Semi-Pro | Scotland Semi-Pro | Rep of Ireland Semi-Pro |
| (Wales) 2008 | England Semi-Pro | Wales Semi-Pro | Scotland Semi-Pro | Gibraltar |
