= Lella =

Lella is a given name and a surname.

== Given name ==
- Lella Cuberli (born 1945), American soprano
- Lella A. Dillard (1863–1935), American temperance leader
- Lella Fabrizi (1915–1993), Italian stage, television and film actress
- Lella Secor Florence (1887–1966), American writer, journalist, pacifist, feminist and pioneer of birth control
- Lella Kmar (1862–1942), queen consort of Tunisia
- Lella Lombardi (1941–1992), Italian racing driver
- Lella Ricci (1850–1871), Italian opera singer
- Lella Vignelli (1934–2016), Italian architect, designer, and entrepreneur
- Lella Warren (1899–1982), American novelist and short story writer

== Surname ==
- Gustavo Di Lella (born 1973), Argentinian footballer
- Luigi Di Lella (born 1937), Italian experimental particle physicist
- Penèlope di Lella (born 1974), Dutch short track speed skater
- Jan Lella (born 1989), Belgian football midfielder
- Nunzio Lella (born 2000), Italian footballer
