= Lorenzo Benedetti =

Italian footballer

Personal information
- Date of birth: 24 June 1992 (age 34)
- Place of birth: Pietrasanta, Italy
- Height: 1.78 m (5 ft 10 in)
- Position: Forward

Team information
- Current team: Prato
- Number: 11

Youth career
- Fiorentina

Senior career*
Years	Team	Apps	(Gls)
2009–2010	Fiorentina	0	(0)
2009–2010	→ Ponsacco (loan)	3	(0)
2010–2011	Camaiore	29	(7)
2011–2013	Prato	26	(4)
2013–2014	Viareggio	30	(6)
2014–2015	Prato	4	(1)
2014–2015	→ Lucchese (loan)	8	(1)
2016	Viareggio	17	(7)
2016	Colligiana	14	(3)
2016–2018	Seravezza Pozzi	46	(22)
2018–2019	Pianese	45	(24)
2019–2020	Gavorrano	11	(4)
2020–2021	Union Feltre	37	(17)
2021–2025	Seravezza Pozzi	131	(70)
2025–2026	Grosseto	24	(6)
2026–	Prato	0	(0)

International career
2011–2012	Italy U20 Lega Pro	2	(1)
- * Club domestic league appearances and goals as of 2 May 2026

Lorenzo Benedetti (born 24 June 1992) is an Italian footballer who plays for Serie D club Prato.

== Biography ==
Benedetti started his career at ACF Fiorentina. He was the member of its U17 team in 2008–09 season. In 2009, instead of promoted to the reserve, Benedetti was allowed to leave for amateur team Ponsacco. Benedetti left for another Serie D team Camaiore in 2010–11 Serie D. In summer 2011 he was signed by his fourth Tuscan team Prato, where he played his first fully professional season in 2011–12 Lega Pro Prima Divisione. He was selected to the representative team of Lega Pro in December 2011, against Italy U19. He also capped for the same team against England C and San Marino U21. He also won a youth cup in Dubai.

In January 2013 he was sold to Viareggio in a co-ownership deal. In June 2014 Prato bought back Benedetti. On 1 September 2014 he was signed by Lucchese in a temporary deal. On 16 December 2015 Benedetti was released by Prato.

Following that, he played the next 3.5 seasons in Serie D and Eccellenza, eventually earning promotion to Serie C for 2019–20 season with Pianese after scoring 23 goals in Serie D in 2018–19. He was released from his contract with Pianese on 12 December 2019, after coming to agreement with Serie D club Follonica Gavorrano five days prior. In the summer 2020, Benedetti moved to Union Feltre. A year later, he moved to Seravezza Pozzi.
