= 2018–19 Tranmere Rovers F.C. season =

Tranmere Rovers
2018–19 season
- Chairman: Mark Palios
- Manager: Micky Mellon
- Stadium: Prenton Park
- EFL League Two: 6th (promoted via play-offs)
- FA Cup: Third round
- EFL Cup: First round
- EFL Trophy: Group stages
- Biggest win: 5–1 vs Crawley Town, League Two, 27 October 2018
- Biggest defeat: 0–7 vs Tottenham Hotspur, FA Cup, 4 January 2019
Home colours	Away colours	Third colours

The 2018–19 season was Tranmere Rovers' 135th season of existence and their first back in EFL League Two following promotion from the 2017–18 National League. Along with competing in League Two, the club participated in the FA Cup, EFL Cup and EFL Trophy.

The season covers the period from 1 July 2018 to 30 June 2019

== Transfers ==
=== Transfers in ===
Date from	Position	Nationality	Name	From	Fee	Ref.
1 July 2018	AM	(England)	Ollie Banks	Oldham Athletic	Free transfer	
1 July 2018	RB	(England)	Jake Caprice	Leyton Orient	Free transfer	
1 July 2018	CB	(England)	Mark Ellis	Carlisle United	Free transfer	
1 July 2018	CB	(Cameroon)	Manny Monthé	Forest Green Rovers	Undisclosed	
1 July 2018	CF	(England)	Paul Mullin	Swindon Town	Undisclosed	
18 July 2018	LB	(Ivory Coast)	Zoumana Bakayogo	Crewe Alexandra	Free transfer	
2 August 2018	CF	(England)	Cole Stockton	Carlisle United	Free transfer	
13 September 2018	CM	(England)	Ryan Williams	(Brazil) Paysandu	Free transfer	
5 January 2019	DM	(England)	David Perkins	Rochdale	Undisclosed	
7 January 2019	CM	(England)	Harvey Gilmour	Sheffield United	Undisclosed	
7 January 2019	CF	(England)	Ishmael Miller	Oldham Athletic	Free transfer	
31 January 2019	CF	(England)	Chris Dagnall	Bury	Free transfer	

=== Transfers out ===
Date from	Position	Nationality	Name	To	Fee	Ref.
1 July 2018	CF	(England)	James Alabi	Leyton Orient	Undisclosed	
1 July 2018	FW	(Iraq)	Ali Al-Hamadi	(Wales) Swansea City	Undisclosed	
1 July 2018	LB	(England)	Eddie Clarke	Fleetwood Town	Free transfer	
1 July 2018	CF	(England)	Andy Cook	Walsall	Free transfer	
1 July 2018	RM	(England)	Mitch Duggan	Warrington Town	Released	
1 July 2018	SS	(England)	Jack Dunn	Free agent	Released	
1 July 2018	CF	(England)	Devarn Green	Southport	Free transfer	
1 July 2018	CM	(Northern Ireland)	Jeff Hughes	(Northern Ireland) Larne	Free transfer	
1 July 2018	RM	(England)	Jake Kirby	Stockport County	Released	
1 July 2018	CF	(England)	Andy Mangan	(Wales) Bala Town	Released	
1 July 2018	CB	(Scotland)	Jay McEveley	Warrington Town	Released	
1 July 2018	CF	(England)	Elliot Rokka	Free agent	Released	
1 July 2018	CM	(France)	Drissa Traoré	Free agent	Released	
20 July 2018	CM	(England)	James Wallace	Fleetwood Town	Free transfer	
9 August 2018	CM	(Grenada)	Oliver Norburn	Shrewsbury Town	Undisclosed	
4 January 2019	CB	(England)	Declan Drysdale	Coventry City	Compensation	
9 January 2019	CB	(England)	Ritchie Sutton	Morecambe	Free transfer	
14 January 2019	RM	(England)	Larnell Cole	Free agent	Mutual consent	
14 January 2019	CM	(England)	Ryan Williams	Free agent	Released	
24 January 2019	CF	(England)	George Waring	Chester	Mutual consent	

=== Loans in ===
Start date	Position	Nationality	Name	From	End date	Ref.
10 July 2018	LM	(England)	Jonny Smith	Bristol City	31 May 2019	
13 July 2018	MF	(England)	Harvey Gilmour	Sheffield United	7 January 2019	
24 July 2018	GK	(England)	Shamal George	Liverpool	January 2019	
17 August 2018	RM	(England)	Dylan Mottley-Henry	Barnsley	January 2019	
20 August 2018	DM	(Northern Ireland)	Luke McCullough	Doncaster Rovers	31 May 2019	
22 August 2018	CF	(Nigeria)	Franklyn Akammadu	(Italy) Alessandria	31 May 2019	
22 January 2019	LM	(England)	Ben Pringle	Preston North End	31 May 2019	
28 January 2019	LW	(England)	Kieron Morris	Walsall	31 May 2019	
29 January 2019	CB	(England)	Sid Nelson	Millwall	31 May 2019	

=== Loans out ===
Start date	Position	Nationality	Name	To	End date	Ref.
18 August 2018	MF	(England)	Jay Devine	Colwyn Bay	September 2018	
18 August 2018	GK	(England)	Paddy Wharton	Colwyn Bay	September 2018	
22 October 2018	GK	(England)	Paddy Wharton	Stalybridge Celtic	November 2018	
23 November 2018	GK	(England)	Paddy Wharton	Marine	December 2018	
27 November 2018	CF	(England)	George Waring	Kidderminster Harriers	January 2019	
21 December 2018	RM	(England)	Ben Tollitt	(Wales) Wrexham	16 February 2019	
7 January 2019	CF	(England)	Cole Stockton	(Wales) Wrexham	31 May 2019	
8 January 2019	GK	(England)	Paddy Wharton	Stalybridge Celtic	31 May 2019	

== Competitions ==
=== Friendlies ===
Tranmere Rovers announced friendlies with Dunfermline Athletic, Liverpool, Wigan Athletic, Warrington Town, Fleetwood Town, Chorley and Rochdale.

7 July 2018 Friendly	Dunfermline Athletic	0–4	Tranmere Rovers	Dunfermline, Scotland
15:00 BST		Report	Cole 40'; Soukouna 51'; Walker-Rice 70'; Long 89'	Stadium: East End Park; Attendance: 723

10 July 2018 Friendly	Tranmere Rovers	2–3	Liverpool	Birkenhead
19:30 BST	Smith 72'; Soukouna 81'	Report	Camacho 8'; Ojo 27'; Lallana 33'	Stadium: Prenton Park

14 July 2018 Friendly	Tranmere Rovers	1–2	Wigan Athletic	Birkenhead
15:00 BST	Norwood 88'	Report	Grigg 2' (pen.); Walker 69'	Stadium: Prenton Park

17 July 2018 Friendly	Warrington Town	0–2	Tranmere Rovers	Warrington
19:30 BST		Report	Mullin 33'; Castaño 72'	Stadium: Cantilever Park

21 July 2018 Friendly	Tranmere Rovers	0–2	Fleetwood Town	Birkenhead
15:00 BST		Report	Dempsey 23'; Evans 84'	Stadium: Prenton Park

24 July 2018 Friendly	Chorley	0–1	Tranmere Rovers	Chorley
19:30 BST		Report	Jennings 71'	Stadium: Victory Park

28 July 2018 Friendly	Tranmere Rovers	1–3	Rochdale	Birkenhead
15:00 BST	Gilmour 82'	Report	Camps 31'; Inman 42'; Wilbraham 69' (pen.)	Stadium: Prenton Park; Referee: Peter Wright

=== EFL League Two ===
==== League table ====
Pos	Team	Pld	W	D	L	GF	GA	GD	Pts	Promotion, qualification or relegation
4	Mansfield Town	46	20	16	10	69	41	+28	76	Qualification for League Two play-offs (Note: Four teams play for one spot and promotion to EFL League One.)
5	Forest Green Rovers	46	20	14	12	68	47	+21	74	Qualification for League Two play-offs
6	Tranmere Rovers (O, P)	46	20	13	13	63	50	+13	73	Qualification for League Two play-offs
7	Newport County	46	20	11	15	59	59	0	71	Qualification for League Two play-offs
8	Colchester United	46	20	10	16	65	53	+12	70	

Source: EFL Official Website
Rules for classification: 1) Points; 2) Goal difference; 3) Number of goals scored; 4) Head-to-head results
(O) Play-off winners; (P) Promoted

==== Results summary ====
Overall								Home						Away					
Pld	W	D	L	GF	GA	GD	Pts	W	D	L	GF	GA	GD	W	D	L	GF	GA	GD
46	20	13	13	63	50	+13	73	14	5	4	33	13	+20	6	8	9	30	37	−7

Last updated: 4 May 2019.
Source: BBC

==== Results by matchday ====
Matchday	1	2	3	4	5	6	7	8	9	10	11	12	13	14	15	16	17	18	19	20	21	22	23	24	25	26	27	28	29	30	31	32	33	34	35	36	37	38	39	40	41	42	43	44	45	46
Ground	A	H	A	H	H	A	H	A	H	A	H	A	H	A	A	H	H	A	H	A	H	A	A	H	H	A	A	H	A	H	H	A	A	H	A	H	H	A	H	A	A	H	H	A	H	A
Result	D	W	L	D	W	D	D	W	L	D	W	W	W	D	L	W	W	L	D	L	W	L	L	W	D	D	W	L	L	L	W	D	W	W	W	W	W	W	W	L	D	W	L	D	D	L
Position	12	8	13	14	10	11	14	8	13	15	10	7	4	6	7	7	4	7	7	8	7	8	9	8	9	9	9	10	10	10	10	11	9	9	6	5	5	5	5	5	5	5	5	6	6	6

Updated to match(es) played on 4 May 2019. Source: Statto.com
A = Away; H = Home; W = Win; D = Draw; L = Loss

==== Matches ====
On 21 June 2018, the League Two fixtures for the forthcoming season were announced.

4 August 2018 1	Stevenage	2–2	Tranmere Rovers	Stevenage
15:00 BST	Ball 20'; Byrom 27'; Hunt (red card) 74'	Report	Norwood 33', 55'	Stadium: Broadhall Way; Attendance: 3,315; Referee: Charles Breakspear

11 August 2018 2	Tranmere Rovers	1–0	Cheltenham Town	Birkenhead
15:00 BST	Norwood 13'	Report		Stadium: Prenton Park; Attendance: 6,736; Referee: Ben Toner

18 August 2018 3	Swindon Town	3–2	Tranmere Rovers	Swindon
15:00 BST	Adebayo 20'; Richards 60'; Romanski 73'	Report	Smith 10'; Norwood 13'; Harris (red card) 18'	Stadium: County Ground; Attendance: 6,106; Referee: Alan Young

21 August 2018 4	Tranmere Rovers	0–0	Mansfield Town	Birkenhead
19:45 BST		Report		Stadium: Prenton Park; Attendance: 5,466; Referee: Thomas Bramall

25 August 2018 5	Tranmere Rovers	1–0	Port Vale	Birkenhead
15:00 BST	Norwood 77'	Report		Stadium: Prenton Park; Attendance: 6,488; Referee: Dean Whitestone

1 September 2018 6	Northampton Town	1–1	Tranmere Rovers	Northampton
15:00 BST	Morias 61'	Report	Norwood 51'	Stadium: Sixfields Stadium; Attendance: 4,916; Referee: Nick Kinseley

8 September 2018 7	Tranmere Rovers	1–1	Colchester United	Birkenhead
15:00 BST	Norwood 42'	Report	Pell 61'	Stadium: Prenton Park; Attendance: 5,885; Referee: Robert Lewis

15 September 2018 8	Carlisle United	0–2	Tranmere Rovers	Carlisle
15:00 BST		Report	Parkes 80' (o.g.); Mullin 86'	Stadium: Brunton Park; Attendance: 5,187; Referee: Matt Donohue

22 September 2018 9	Tranmere Rovers	0–1	Newport County	Birkenhead
15:00 BST		Report	Franks 5'	Stadium: Prenton Park; Attendance: 5,745; Referee: Carl Boyeson

29 September 2018 10	Milton Keynes Dons	1–1	Tranmere Rovers	Denbigh
15:00 BST	Aneke 45+3'	Report	Smith 37'	Stadium: Stadium mk Attendance: 7,048; Referee: Lee Collins

2 October 2018 11	Tranmere Rovers	1–0	Lincoln City	Birkenhead
19:45 BST	Norwood 61' (red card) 90+3'	Report		Stadium: Prenton Park; Attendance: 5,467; Referee: Andy Haines

6 October 2018 12	Morecambe	3–4	Tranmere Rovers	Morecambe
15:00 BST	Oates 13' (yellow card) 23'; Oliver 73'; Leitch-Smith 80'	Report	Banks 28'; Gilmour 41', 89'; Smith 54'; Jennings (yellow card) 72'; Buxton (yellow card) 80'; McCullough (yellow card) 90+5'	Stadium: Globe Arena; Attendance: 2,793; Referee: Trevor Kettle

12 October 2018 13	Tranmere Rovers	1–0	Macclesfield Town	Birkenhead
19:45 BST	Gilmour 74'	Report		Stadium: Prenton Park; Attendance: 6,797; Referee: Anthony Backhouse

20 October 2018 14	Yeovil Town	0–0	Tranmere Rovers	Yeovil
15:00 BST		Report		Stadium: Huish Park; Attendance: 3,007; Referee: Chris Sarginson

23 October 2018 15	Forest Green Rovers	3–1	Tranmere Rovers	Nailsworth
19:45 BST	Brown 11'; Shephard 39'; Campbell 90+8'	Report	Mullin 85'	Stadium: The New Lawn; Attendance: 2,181; Referee: Antony Coggins

27 October 2018 16	Tranmere Rovers	5–1	Crawley Town	Birkenhead
15:00 BST	Jennings 25'; Norwood 43', 54'; Buxton 58' (pen.); Mullin 60'	Report	Francomb (yellow card) 18'; Palmer 65'	Stadium: Prenton Park; Attendance: 5,445; Referee: Tom Nield

3 November 2018 17	Tranmere Rovers	2–0	Exeter City	Birkenhead
15:00 GMT	Norwood 31', 55'	Report	L. Martin (yellow card) 45'; Moxey (yellow card) 56' (yellow-red card) 73'	Stadium: Prenton Park; Attendance: 6,209; Referee: Thomas Bramall

17 November 2018 18	Crewe Alexandra	3–2	Tranmere Rovers	Crewe
15:00 GMT	Ainley 20', 51'; Kirk 67'	Report	Norwood 36'; Banks 83'	Stadium: Gresty Road; Attendance: 5,154; Referee: Carl Boyeson

24 November 2018 19	Tranmere Rovers	1–1	Oldham Athletic	Birkenhead
15:00 GMT	Jennings 72'	Report	Branger 40'	Stadium: Prenton Park; Attendance: 7,150; Referee: Sebastian Stockbridge

27 November 2018 20	Grimsby Town	5–2	Tranmere Rovers	Cleethorpes
19:45 GMT	Clifton 33'; Thomas 40'; Davis 48'; Rose 82' (pen.); Embleton 90'	Report	Norwood 11'; Mullin 65'	Stadium: Blundell Park; Attendance: 3,293; Referee: Darren Drysdale

8 December 2018 21	Tranmere Rovers	1–0	Cambridge United	Birkenhead
15:00 GMT	Norwood 77'	Report		Stadium: Prenton Park; Attendance: 5,016; Referee: Ollie Yates

15 December 2018 22	Notts County	3–2	Tranmere Rovers	Nottingham
15:00 GMT	Stead (yellow card) 27' (goal) 33', 76' (pen.); Hemmings 44'; Fitzsimons (yellow card) 58'	Report	Smith 38'; Jennings 58' (yellow card) 59'	Stadium: Meadow Lane; Attendance: 6,535; Referee: Robert Lewis

22 December 2018 23	Bury	2–1	Tranmere Rovers	Bury
15:00 GMT	Maynard 52'; Lavery 90+1'	Report	Sutton 90+4'	Stadium: Gigg Lane; Attendance: 4,748; Referee: Andy Haines

26 December 2018 24	Tranmere Rovers	3–1	Morecambe	Birkenhead
15:00 GMT	Stockton 3' (yellow card) 37'; Norwood 29'; Harris 45'; Ellis (yellow card) 86'	Report	Wildig (yellow card) 57'; Mills (yellow card) 65'; Cranston 66'	Stadium: Prenton Park; Attendance: 7,483; Referee: Scott Oldham

29 December 2018 25	Tranmere Rovers	0–0	Yeovil Town	Birkenhead
15:00 GMT	Ridehalgh (yellow card) 34'	Report	Dickinson (yellow card) 38'	Stadium: Prenton Park; Attendance: 5,782; Referee: Charles Breakspear

1 January 2019 26	Macclesfield Town	1–1	Tranmere Rovers	Macclesfield
15:00 GMT	Grimes (yellow card) 27'; Arthur 41'	Report	Jennings 32' (yellow card) 75'; Monthé (yellow card) 73'	Stadium: Moss Rose; Attendance: 3,398; Referee: Michael Salisbury

12 January 2019 27	Cheltenham Town	1–3	Tranmere Rovers	Cheltenham
15:00 GMT	Broom (yellow card) 24'; Varney 42'	Report	Banks (yellow card) 39'; Norwood 46'; Miller 61'; McCullough (yellow card) 69'; Banks 72'; Harris (yellow card) 83'	Stadium: Whaddon Road; Attendance: 3,104; Referee: Anthony Coggins

19 January 2019 28	Tranmere Rovers	1–2	Swindon Town	Birkenhead
15:00 GMT	Norwood 52'; Monthé (yellow card) 88'; Buxton (yellow card) 90'	Report	Richards 20'; Doughty 36'	Stadium: Prenton Park; Attendance: 5,847; Referee: Ross Joyce

26 January 2019 29	Mansfield Town	3–0	Tranmere Rovers	Mansfield
15:00 GMT	Grant 22', 68'; Walker 65'	Report	McCullough (yellow card) 15'; McNulty (yellow card) 21'; Banks (yellow card) 32' (yellow-red card) 37'; Monthé (yellow card) 45'	Stadium: Field Mill; Attendance: 4,885; Referee: Ben Toner

5 February 2019 30	Tranmere Rovers	1–2	Northampton Town	Birkenhead
19:45 GMT	Norwood 25'	Report	Hoskins 2', 45+3'; O'Toole (yellow card) 67'; Pierre (yellow card) 83'; Facey (yellow card) 87'	Stadium: Prenton Park; Attendance: 5,098; Referee: Paul Marsden

9 February 2019 31	Tranmere Rovers	2–0	Stevenage	Birkenhead
15:00 GMT	Morris 45+4'; Norwood 79'	Report	Byrom (yellow card) 42'; Nugent (yellow card) 49' (yellow-red card) 75'; Adebayo (red card) 90+3'	Stadium: Prenton Park; Attendance: 5,283; Referee: Eddie Ilderton

16 February 2019 32	Cambridge United	0–0	Tranmere Rovers	Cambridge
15:00 GMT	Halliday (yellow card) 88'	Report	Bakayogo (yellow card) 45+2'; Perkins (yellow card) 45+5'	Stadium: Abbey Stadium; Attendance: 4,872; Referee: Brett Huxtable

19 February 2019 33	Port Vale	1–2	Tranmere Rovers	Burslem
19:45 GMT	Hannant (yellow card) 44'; Smith (yellow card) 45+5'; Whitfield 59'; Gibbons (yellow card) 89'	Report	Norwood 10' (yellow card) 31' (goal) 56'; Caprice (yellow card) 67'; Monthé (yellow card) 83'; Jennings (yellow card) 85'; Perkins (yellow card) 89'; Gilmour (yellow card) 90+4'	Stadium: Vale Park; Attendance: 3,835; Referee: Craig Hicks

23 February 2019 34	Tranmere Rovers	1–0	Notts County	Birkenhead
15:00 GMT	Perkins (yellow card) 24'; Jennings 69'	Report	Hemmings (yellow card) 60'; Doyle (yellow card) 73'	Stadium: Prenton Park; Attendance: 6,559; Referee: Scott Oldham

2 March 2019 35	Exeter City	0–1	Tranmere Rovers	Exeter
15:00 GMT		Report	Norwood 31'; Perkins (yellow card) 45+1'; Bakayogo (yellow card) 56'; McCullough (yellow card) 66'	Stadium: St James Park; Attendance: 4,855; Referee: John Busby

8 March 2019 36	Tranmere Rovers	1–0	Crewe Alexandra	Birkenhead
19:45 GMT	Perkins (yellow card) 25'; Jennings (yellow card) 69'; Norwood 72'	Report		Stadium: Prenton Park; Attendance: 7,898; Referee: Martin Coy

12 March 2019 37	Tranmere Rovers	4–1	Grimsby Town	Birkenhead
19:45 GMT	Jennings 18', 44'; Monthé 34'; Norwood 39'; Davies (yellow card) 80'	Report	Thomas (penalty missed) 32'; Woolford 33'	Stadium: Prenton Park; Attendance: 5,269; Referee: Graham Salisbury

23 March 2019 38	Colchester United	0–2	Tranmere Rovers	Colchester
15:00 GMT	Kent (yellow card) 76'	Report	Norwood 23'; Ellis (yellow card) 25'; Perkins 46' (yellow card) 84'; Jennings (yellow card) 53'	Stadium: Colchester Community Stadium; Attendance: 2,800; Referee: Ross Joyce

30 March 2019 39	Tranmere Rovers	3–0	Carlisle United	Birkenhead
15:00 GMT	Banks 45+1'; Norwood 64'; Monthé 82'	Report		Stadium: Prenton Park; Attendance: 8,095; Referee: Scott Duncan

2 April 2019 40	Oldham Athletic	2–0	Tranmere Rovers	Oldham
19:45 BST	Lang 7', 61'; Edmundson (yellow card) 90+1'	Report	Ridehalgh (yellow card) 42'; Perkins (yellow card) 90+2'	Stadium: Boundary Park; Attendance: 5,143; Referee: Matt Donohue

6 April 2019 41	Newport County	0–0	Tranmere Rovers	Newport
15:00 BST	Labadie (yellow card) 6'; Butler (yellow card) 32'; Poole (yellow card) 64'; O'Brien (yellow card) 83'	Report	Ridehalgh (yellow card) 50'; Norwood (yellow card) 55'; Banks (yellow card) 67'; Monthé (yellow card) 73'	Stadium: Rodney Parade; Attendance: 3,170; Referee: Alan Young

13 April 2019 42	Tranmere Rovers	2–1	Milton Keynes Dons	Birkenhead
15:00 BST	Perkins 30'; Jennings 62'; Harris (yellow card) 90+2'	Report	Agard 32' (yellow card) 64'; Martin (yellow card) 73'; Lewington (yellow card) 89'; Aneke (yellow card) 90+1'	Stadium: Prenton Park; Attendance: 8,357; Referee: John Brooks

19 April 2019 43	Tranmere Rovers	0–1	Forest Green Rovers	Birkenhead
15:00 BST	Norwood (yellow card) 80'	Report	Mondal 47'; McGinley (yellow card) 80'	Stadium: Prenton Park; Attendance: 9,468; Referee: Dean Whitestone

22 April 2019 44	Lincoln City	0–0	Tranmere Rovers	Lincoln
15:00 BST	Akinde (yellow card) 77'	Report	Norwood (yellow card) 88'	Stadium: Sincil Bank; Attendance: 9,658; Referee: Anthony Backhouse

30 April 2019 45	Tranmere Rovers	1–1	Bury	Birkenhead
19:45 BST	Norwood 11'; Jennings (yellow card) 68'; Banks (yellow card) 83'	Report	Stokes (yellow card) 54'; Mayor 56' (yellow card) 57'	Stadium: Prenton Park; Attendance: 9,145; Referee: David Webb

4 May 2019 46	Crawley Town	3–1	Tranmere Rovers	Crawley
12:30 BST	Nathaniel-George 36'; Morais 42'; Camará 90+2'	Report	Norwood 50' (pen.); Buxton (yellow card) 76'	Stadium: Broadfield Stadium; Attendance: 3,183; Referee: Andy Haines

==== Play-offs ====
10 May 2019 Semi-final first leg	Tranmere Rovers	1–0	Forest Green Rovers	Birkenhead
19:45 BST	Banks 26'	Report	Gunning (red card) 15'	Stadium: Prenton Park; Attendance: 9,579; Referee: John Busby

13 May 2019 Semi-final second leg	Forest Green Rovers	1–1 (1–2 agg.)	Tranmere Rovers	Nailsworth
19:45 BST	Mills 12'; Winchester (yellow card) 45+2' (yellow-red card) 67'	Report	Banks (yellow card) 16'; Norwood 27'	Stadium: The New Lawn; Attendance: 4,492; Referee: Eddie Ilderton

25 May 2019 Final	Newport County	0–1 (a.e.t.)	Tranmere Rovers	Wembley Stadium, London
15:00 BST	Matt (yellow card) 55'; O'Brien (yellow card) 67' (yellow-red card) 89'; Poole (yellow card) 112'	Report	Perkins (yellow card) 77'; Jennings 119'	Attendance: 25,217; Referee: Ross Joyce

=== FA Cup ===
The first round draw was made live on BBC by Dennis Wise and Dion Dublin on 22 October. The draw for the second round was made live on BBC and BT by Mark Schwarzer and Glenn Murray on 12 November. The third round draw was made live on BBC by Ruud Gullit and Paul Ince from Stamford Bridge on 3 December 2018.

10 November 2018 First round	Tranmere Rovers	3–3	Oxford City	Birkenhead
15:00 GMT	Jennings 34', 78'; Norwood 89'	Report	Tshimanga 39', 66', 82'	Stadium: Prenton Park; Attendance: 4,206; Referee: Daniel Middleton

20 November 2018 First round replay	Oxford City	0–2	Tranmere Rovers	Marston
19:45 GMT		Report	Norwood 6'; Mullin 30'	Stadium: Court Place Farm; Attendance: 1,172; Referee: Craig Hicks

2 December 2018 Second round	Tranmere Rovers	1–1	Southport	Birkenhead
14:00 GMT	Smith 18'	Report	Bauress 70'	Stadium: Prenton Park; Attendance: 4,701; Referee: Anthony Backhouse

17 December 2018 Second round replay	Southport	0–2	Tranmere Rovers	Blowick
19:45 GMT		Report	Jennings 14', 43'; Harris (yellow card) 19'	Stadium: Haig Avenue; Attendance: 5,414; Referee: Thomas Bramall

4 January 2019 Third round	Tranmere Rovers	0–7	Tottenham Hotspur	Birkenhead
19:45 GMT		Report	Aurier 40', 55'; Llorente 48', 71', 72'; Son Heung-min 57'; Kane 82'	Stadium: Prenton Park; Attendance: 12,553; Referee: Andre Marriner

=== EFL Cup ===
On 15 June 2018, the draw for the first round was made in Vietnam.

14 August 2018 First round	Tranmere Rovers	1–3	Walsall	Birkenhead
19:45 BST	Cole 80'	Report	Ferrier 29'; Ginnelly 64'; Ismail 68'	Stadium: Prenton Park; Attendance: 3,817; Referee: Michael Salisbury

=== EFL Trophy ===
On 13 July 2018, the initial group stage draw bar the U21 invited clubs was announced.

Pos	Lge	Team	Pld	W	PW	PL	L	GF	GA	GD	Pts	Qualification
1	L1	Shrewsbury Town	3	2	1	0	0	9	2	+7	8	Round 2
2	ACA	Manchester City U21	3	2	0	1	0	6	2	+4	7	Round 2
3	L2	Crewe Alexandra	3	1	0	0	2	6	9	−3	3	
4	L2	Tranmere Rovers	3	0	0	0	3	3	11	−8	0	

Source: EFL.com

4 September 2018 Group stages	Tranmere Rovers	3–4	Crewe Alexandra	Birkenhead
19:45 BST	Harris 45+4'; Stockton 45+10'; Mullin 46'	Report	20'; Nicholls 73'; Porter 85'; Jones 86'	Stadium: Prenton Park; Attendance: 2,174; Referee: Graham Salisbury

9 October 2018 Group stages	Shrewsbury Town	6–0	Tranmere Rovers	Shrewsbury
19:00 BST	John-Lewis 11'; Docherty 18'; Beckles 23'; Okenabirhie 56', 74', 90+1'	Report		Stadium: New Meadow; Attendance: 1,379

30 October 2018 Group stages	Tranmere Rovers	0–1	Manchester City U21	Birkenhead
19:00 BST		Report	Matondo 49'	Stadium: Prenton Park; Attendance: 747
