= Yorick (disambiguation) =

Yorick is a character in William Shakespeare's Hamlet.

Yorick may also refer to:

- Parson Yorick, a fictional character created by Laurence Sterne, who appears in The Life and Opinions of Tristram Shandy, Gentleman and narrates A Sentimental Journey Through France and Italy
- Yorick, a puppet from Sam and Friends
- Yorick (programming language)

== People with the name ==
- Yorick Antheunis (born 1991), Belgian footballer
- Yorick Smythies (1917–1980), British philosopher
- Yorick Treille (born 1980), French ice hockey player
- Yorick van Wageningen (born 1964), Dutch actor
- Yorick Wilks (1939–2023), British computer scientist
- Yorick Williams (born 1975), British basketball player
