= Lorenzo Degeri =

Italian footballer

Personal information
- Full name: Lorenzo Maria Degeri
- Date of birth: 13 October 1992 (age 34)
- Place of birth: Crema, Italy
- Height: 1.92 m (6 ft 3 1/2 in)
- Position: Midfielder

Youth career
- 2004–2008: Internazionale
- 2008–2010: Cremonese

Senior career*
Years	Team	Apps	(Gls)
2010–2015	Cremonese	26	(1)
2013–2014	→ Pavia (loan)	9	(1)
2014	→ Rimini (loan)	7	(0)
2014–2015	→ Lucchese (loan)	26	(1)
2015–2016	Pro Patria	15	(0)
2017–2018	Giana Erminio	22	(0)

International career
2011–2012	Italy U20 Lega Pro		
2013	Italy Universiade	4	(1)
- * Club domestic league appearances and goals as of 11 May 2018

Lorenzo Maria Degeri (born 13 October 1992) is an Italian footballer.

== Biography ==
Born in Crema, the Province of Cremona, Lombardy, Degeri started his career at Internazionale. He played for Giovanissimi Regionali B U13 team to Allievi B U16 team in 2007–08 season.

=== Cremonese ===
In mid-2008 Degeri returned to Cremona for Cremonese Allievi U17 team in temporary deal. The team was eliminated by Inter in the round of 16, which Inter was the losing finalists that season. Degeri's deal was renewed in 2009. He scored 17 goals in Campionato Berretti for Cremonese reserve. Degeri was promoted to the first team in 2010 after the club signed him in co-ownership deal for €500. Degeri was also eligible to the reserve of Cremonese until 2011. He collected 16 presences during the season 2012-2013 playing with Cremonese. He loaned to Pavia from September to January collecting 9 presences and a goal. In January 2014, he was loaned to Rimini.

In 2014, he was signed by Lucchese.

=== Pro Patria ===
On 14 September 2015 he was signed by Pro Patria.

=== International career ===
Degeri was selected to Italy Lega Pro representative teams for a Dubai youth tournament. The team won all 3 matches of the group stage. The team then eliminated RC Lens and beat Al-Shabab in the final. In June 2012 he received a call-up to Italy national under-20 football team against the representative team of Serie D. With Lega Pro representatives, he also played against Italy national under-19 football team. He also participated in 2013 Summer Universiade.
