= Brecht Capon =

Belgian footballer

Personal information
- Date of birth: 22 April 1988 (age 38)
- Place of birth: Ostend, Belgium
- Height: 1.79 m (5 ft 10 1/2 in)
- Positions: Right-back; winger

Youth career
- 1997–2006: Club Brugge

Senior career*
Years	Team	Apps	(Gls)
2007–2010	Club Brugge	31	(1)
2009–2010	→ KV Kortrijk (loan)	33	(1)
2010–2015	KV Kortrijk	186	(11)
2015–2023	KV Oostende	183	(7)

International career
2003	Belgium U15	3	(0)
2005–2006	Belgium U18	8	(2)
2006	Belgium U19	4	(1)
2007–2010	Belgium U21	13	(0)
- * Club domestic league appearances and goals

Brecht Capon (born 22 April 1988) is a Belgian former footballer.

== Career ==
On 12 June 2009, he joined K.V. Kortrijk on loan from Club Brugge.

== International career ==
Capon played at the 2007–09 International Challenge Trophy and scored the only goal in the final against hosts England.
