= Paddy Wharton =

English footballer

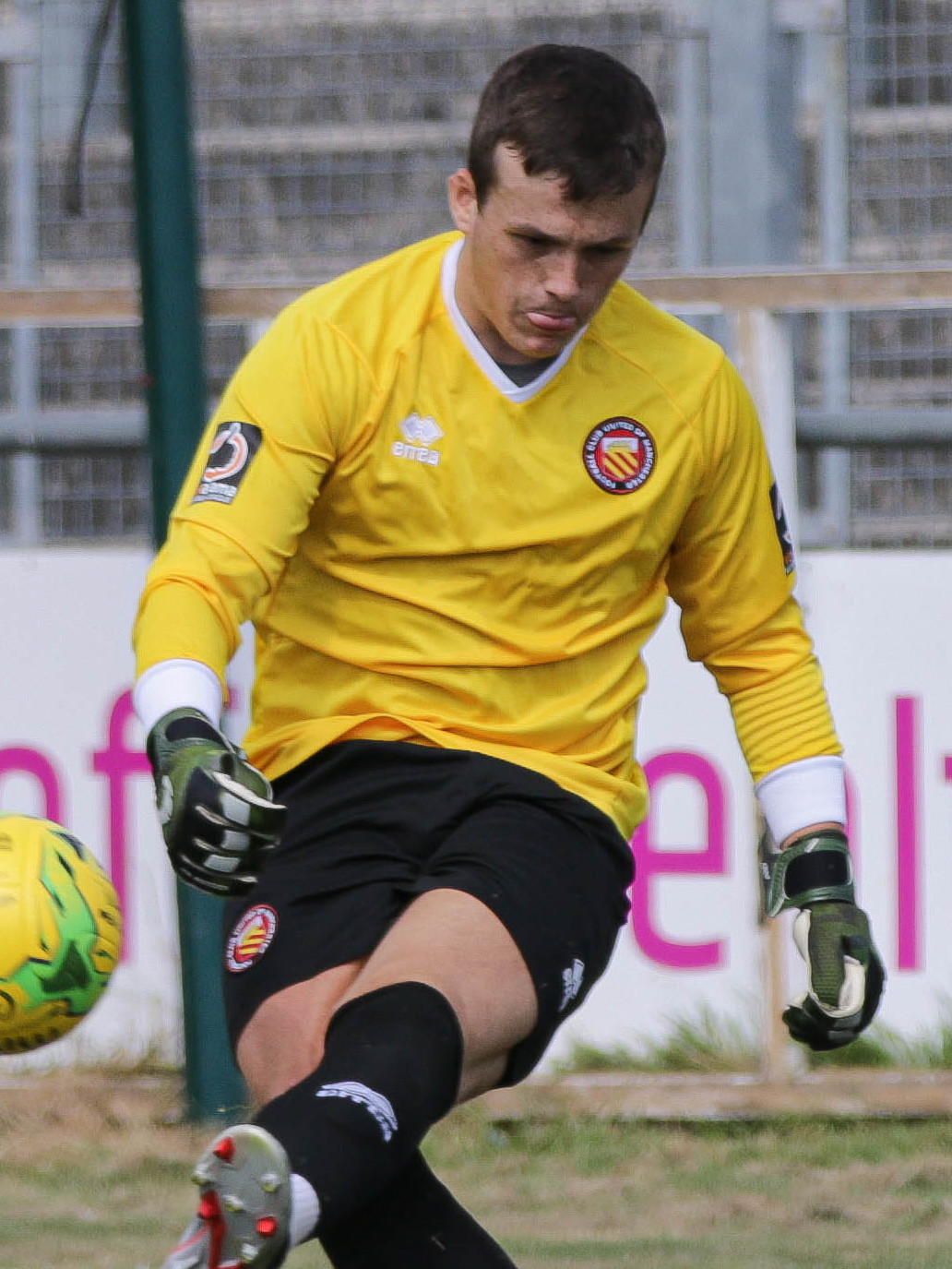
- Wharton with FC United of Manchester in July 2019

Personal information
- Full name: Patrick Wharton
- Date of birth: 27 May 2000 (age 26)
- Height: 6 ft 1 in (1.85 m)
- Position: Goalkeeper

Team information
- Current team: Runcorn Linnets

Youth career
- Liverpool
- Everton
- 2012–2017: Tranmere Rovers

Senior career*
| Years | Team | Apps | (Gls) |
| 2017–2019 | Tranmere Rovers | 0 | (0) |
| 2018 | → Colwyn Bay (loan) | 6 | (0) |
| 2018 | → Stalybridge Celtic (loan) | 5 | (0) |
| 2018–2019 | → Marine (loan) | 9 | (0) |
| 2019 | → Stalybridge Celtic (loan) | 3 | (0) |
| 2019–2020 | FC United of Manchester | 11 | (0) |
| 2019–2020 | → Atherton Collieries (loan) | | |
| 2020–2020 | Atherton Collieries | | |
| 2020– | Runcorn Linnets | 10 | |
- * Club domestic league appearances and goals as of 11:04, 7 October 2019 (UTC)

Paddy Wharton (born 27 May 2000) is an English footballer who plays as a goalkeeper for Runcorn Linnets. He played professionally for Tranmere Rovers. He has also played on loan at Colwyn Bay, Marine, Stalybridge Celtic and Atherton Collieries

== Playing career ==
Wharton spent his childhood at the Academies at Liverpool and Everton, before he came through the academy at Tranmere Rovers to sign professional forms in January 2017. He joined Northern Premier League Division One West team Colwyn Bay on loan on 18 August 2018. He made his debut later that day, keeping a clean sheet in a 1–0 victory over Kendal Town at Llanelian Road. He played seven games for the "Seagulls" before returning to Prenton Park; Bay manager Craig Hogg said that "both players [Wharton and Jay Devine] have been excellent to work with and are a total credit to their club". On 9 October, Wharton made his senior debut for Tranmere in a 6–0 defeat at Shrewsbury Town in the group stages of the EFL Trophy.

On 22 October, he joined Northern Premier League Premier Division side Stalybridge Celtic on a one-month loan deal after "Celts" goalkeeper Jake Turner picked up an injury. He made seven appearances for Simon Haworth's "Bridge", before he returned to Rovers in November. He immediately joined Northern Premier League Premier Division side Marine on loan. He made ten appearances for Neil Young's "Mariners". On 7 January 2019, he returned to Stalybridge Celtic for his second loan spell of the season at Bower Fold, this time joining until the end of the 2018–19 season.

He was released by Tranmere at the end of the 2018–19 season.

In May 2019 he joined FC United of Manchester.

In December 2019 he joined Atherton Collieries on loan. During the loan he played in the FA Trophy, which lead to FC United stating they would never play him again after the loan expires as they had agreed a Gentlemen's agreement that he wouldn't play in the FA Trophy. Wharton denied this agreement existed and called the situation a disgrace.

== Statistics ==
As of 29 January 2019.

Appearances and goals by club, season and competition
| Club | Season | League | | | FA Cup | | EFL Cup | | Other | | Total | |
| Club | Season | Division | Apps | Goals | Apps | Goals | Apps | Goals | Apps | Goals | Apps | Goals |
|---|---|---|---|---|---|---|---|---|---|---|---|---|
| Tranmere Rovers | 2016–17 | National League | 0 | 0 | 0 | 0 | 0 | 0 | 0 | 0 | 0 | 0 |
| Tranmere Rovers | 2017–18 | National League | 0 | 0 | 0 | 0 | 0 | 0 | 0 | 0 | 0 | 0 |
| Tranmere Rovers | 2018–19 | EFL League Two | 0 | 0 | 0 | 0 | 0 | 0 | 1 (Note: Appearance(s) in the EFL Trophy) | 0 | 1 | 0 |
| Tranmere Rovers | Total | | 0 | 0 | 0 | 0 | 0 | 0 | 1 | 0 | 1 | 0 |
| Colwyn Bay (loan) | 2018–19 | Northern Division One West | 6 | 0 | 1 | 0 | 0 | 0 | 0 | 0 | 7 | 0 |
| Stalybridge Celtic (loan) | 2018–19 | Northern Premier Division | 8 | 0 | 0 | 0 | 0 | 0 | 2 (Note: Appearance(s) in the FA Trophy) | 0 | 10 | 0 |
| Marine (loan) | 2018–19 | Northern Premier Division | 9 | 0 | 0 | 0 | 0 | 0 | 1 (Note: Appearance(s) in the Northern Premier League Challenge Cup) | 0 | 10 | 0 |
| Career total | | | 23 | 0 | 1 | 0 | 0 | 0 | 4 | 0 | 28 | 0 |
