= Vincenzo Sarno =

Italian footballer

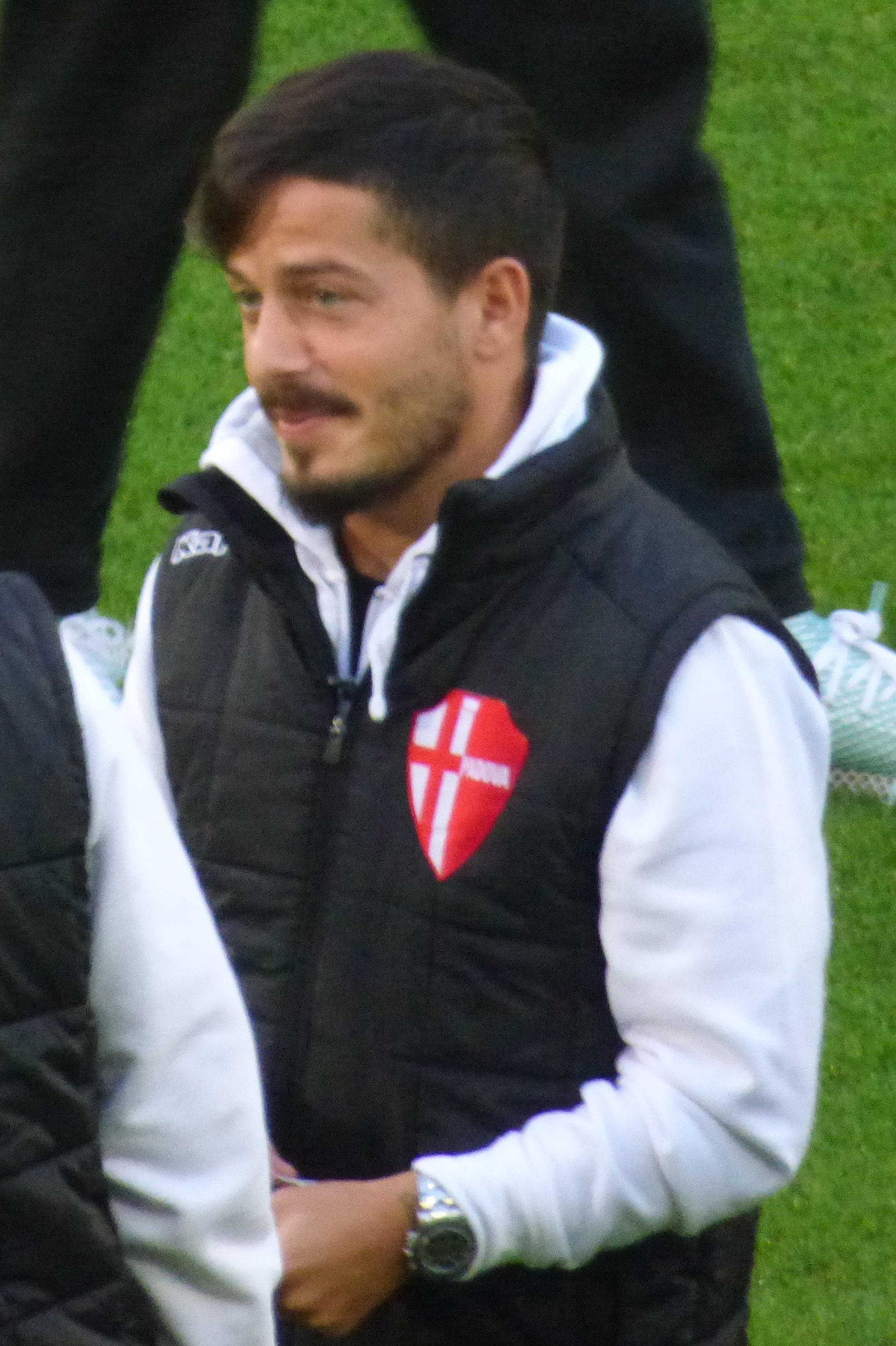
- Sarno in 2018

Personal information
- Date of birth: 11 March 1988 (age 38)
- Place of birth: Naples, Italy
- Height: 1.67 m (5 ft 5 1/2 in)
- Positions: Striker; attacking midfielder

Team information
- Current team: Real Casalnuovo

Youth career
- 1999: Torino
- 1999–2002: Gaetano Scirea Secondigliano
- 2002–2005: Roma
- 2005: Sangiovannese

Senior career*
Years	Team	Apps	(Gls)
2005–2007	Sangiovannese	23	(1)
2007	→ Giulianova (loan)	14	(0)
2008	Brescia	2	(0)
2008–2009	Potenza	22	(1)
2009–2011	Pro Patria	40	(7)
2011–2013	Reggina	33	(1)
2012	→ Lanciano (loan)	11	(0)
2013–2014	Virtus Entella	21	(1)
2014–2018	Foggia	94	(30)
2018–2019	Padova	15	(0)
2019–2020	Catania	23	(5)
2020	→ Triestina (loan)	3	(2)
2020–2022	Triestina	45	(2)
2022–2023	Catania	18	(2)
2023–	Real Casalnuovo	0	(0)
- * Club domestic league appearances and goals as of 7 May 2023

Vincenzo Sarno (born 11 March 1988) is an Italian professional footballer who plays as a striker or attacking midfielder for Serie D club Real Casalnuovo.

== Club career ==
Born in the Secondigliano neighbourhood of Naples, Sarno became nationally famous at age 11 after he was signed by Torino for a record sum of 120 million lire, gaining him also massive TV coverage and a nickname of "little Maradona" due to his short stature coupled with a very impressive technique. His experience with Torino however lasted only a very few months, and Sarno returned to play for his old club until October 2002, when he was scouted and signed by Roma, and then included in the Giovanissimi Nazionali youth squad.

In October 2005 he joined Serie C1 club Sangiovannese, following Roma's decision to release him for free; he made his professional debut two months later, playing the final minutes of a league game against Sassari Torres. Sarno however failed to find a spot in the first team in the following 2006–07 season, and accepted a loan to another Serie C1 team, Giulianova, in February 2007. However, despite his good appearances while at Giulianova, Sarno played only five games in the first period of the season while back at Sangiovannese, and left the club by mutual consent in December 2007 and accepted an offer from Serie B club Brescia exactly a month later.

After two spare first team appearances with Brescia, he was released by the end of the season and joined Serie C1 club Potenza later in October 2008, In July 2009, after a season with Potenza, he left the club in order to join Pro Patria in the Lega Pro Prima Divisione. At Pro Patria, Sarno finally managed to become a key player despite the club's relegation to the Lega Pro Seconda Divisione league at the end of the season; after accepting to stay for one more season, he was released by Pro Patria in January 2011 after the club failed to pay his wages due to financial troubles.

In January 2011 Sarno returned to Serie B, signing a contract with Reggina. In his first season at Reggina, he played four games, and made also a single substitute appearance in the return leg of the promotion playoff against Novara. He was loaned to Virtus Lanciano in January 2012, after failing to break through the first team at Reggina; at Lanciano he played 11 games with no goals, and then scored a fundamental goal in the second leg of the promotion playoffs against Siracusa, ended in a 3–2 aggregate win for his side. He then scored a second goal for Lanciano in the second leg of the playoff finals against Trapani, helping his side to ensure a historical first promotion ever to Serie B.

Sarno moved back at Reggina for the 2012–13 season, being re-included in the first team for the new season in the Serie B league. He made a total 26 appearances during that season, 11 of them as a substitute, and was released by the end of the season. In September 2013 he signed a contract for Virtus Entella, with whom he won the 2013–14 Lega Pro Prima Divisione title and promotion to Serie B.

After being released for free by Virtus Entella at the end of the 2013–14 season, Sarno agreed a two-year deal with Lega Pro club Foggia on 5 September 2014. On 5 December Sarno scored two goals in the injury time of the Apulian derby Foggia-Lecce, a classic match evoking the golden years of Serie A, writing a memorable page in the history of his team. The match ended 2–0.

He joined Padova during the winter transfer window of the 2017–2018 season. On his first official appearance for the club, he helped his new team win the local derby against Vicenza thanks to a long range strike badly handled by opposing goalkeeper Marco Valentini and tapped in by teammate Marco Guidone.

On 25 January 2019, he signed a 2 1/2-year contract with Catania. On 31 January 2020, he joined Triestina on loan with a conditional purchase obligation.

On 30 September 2022, Sarno signed for Serie D club Catania as a free transfer.
