= Dávid Škutka =

Slovak footballer

Personal information
- Full name: Dávid Škutka
- Date of birth: 25 May 1988 (age 38)
- Place of birth: Snina, Czechoslovakia
- Height: 1.88 m (6 ft 2 in)
- Position: Forward

Youth career
- 2002–2005: MFK Snina
- 2005–2008: MFK Košice

Senior career*
Years	Team	Apps	(Gls)
2008–2012	MFK Košice	126	(28)
2013–2015	Slavia Prague	26	(3)
2014	→ Ostrava (loan)	8	(1)
2014	→ MFK Košice (loan)	15	(3)
2015	→ Podbrezová (loan)	13	(6)
2015–2016	Myjava	21	(2)
2016	Michalovce	14	(4)

International career^{‡}
2008–2009	Slovakia U21	4	(0)
- * Club domestic league appearances and goals as of 16 December 2016 ‡ National team caps and goals as of 21 October 2012

Dávid Škutka (born 25 May 1988) is a Slovak football striker.

Škutka is a versatile forward who starting began his career as a second striker but now usually playing as a centre-forward.

== Club career ==
He started off its career in hometown club MFK Snina. Later he was joined to MFK Košice. He netted for MFK Košice jersey, overall 28 goals in 126 matches. In January 2013, he was transferred to Czech team SK Slavia Prague as the 2nd Corgoň Liga topscorer with 13 goals. He signed a three-and-a-half-year contract.

== Career statistics ==
As of 29 January 2013

Club performance			League		Cup		Continental		Total	
Season	Club	League	Apps	Goals	Apps	Goals	Apps	Goals	Apps	Goals
Slovakia			League		Slovak Cup		Europe		Total	
2007–08	MFK Košice	Corgoň Liga	4	1	2	0	0	0	6	1
2008–09	MFK Košice	Corgoň Liga	24	4	4	1	0	0	28	5
2009–10	MFK Košice	Corgoň Liga	32	6	4	2	4	1	40	9
2010–11	MFK Košice	Corgoň Liga	27	3	1	0	0	0	28	3
2011–12	MFK Košice	Corgoň Liga	23	1	2	0	0	0	25	1
2012–13	MFK Košice	Corgoň Liga	16	13	2	3	0	0	15	12
Career total			126	28	15	6	4	1	145	35
