= Kevin Vink =

Dutch footballer

Personal information
- Full name: Kevin Vink
- Date of birth: 30 July 1984 (age 42)
- Place of birth: Maassluis, Netherlands
- Height: 2.02 m (6 ft 8 in)
- Position: Striker

Team information
- Current team: Excelsior Maassluis

Youth career
- Excelsior Maassluis
- Sparta Rotterdam
- Excelsior Maassluis

Senior career*
Years	Team	Apps	(Gls)
2007–2010	RKC Waalwijk	55	(9)
2009	→ Excelsior (loan)	14	(6)
2010–2018	Excelsior Maassluis	56	(17)
- * Club domestic league appearances and goals as of 16:15, 30 September 2009 (UTC)

Kevin Vink (born 30 July 1984 in Maassluis) is a Dutch retired footballer. Until summer 2018 played as a striker for Dutch Topklasse side Excelsior Maassluis.
