= International Challenge Trophy =

The International Challenge Trophy, originally known as the European Challenge Trophy, was an international association football competition. It is open to national teams featuring semi-professional U-23 footballers who have not yet won senior international caps. While the competition rules allow squads to select foreign-based players, some teams, including the Republic of Ireland, Northern Ireland and Italy, have opted to restrict selection to footballers playing in their home national leagues. The European Challenge Trophy was contested in 2005–06 and featured just four teams - England C, Netherlands Amateurs U-23, Belgium U-21 and Italy Lega Pro U-21. England C won the inaugural competition. The competition was then relaunched as the International Challenge Trophy for the 2007–09 edition. This time the number of participants doubled. The 2009–11 edition was contested by eleven teams.

== Tournaments ==
Year	Winners	Final match result	Runners-up	Number of teams
2005–06; Details	England C	No final	Belgium U-21	4
2007–09; Details	Belgium U-21	1–0	England C	8
2009–11; Details	Portugal U-23	1–0	England C	11
2011–13; Details	Turkey A2	1–0	Norway U23	8
2013–15; Details	Slovakia U-23	2–2; 3–2 pen.	Turkey U-23	8
2015–17; Details	Slovakia U-23	4–0	England C	4
