= Jan Lella =

Belgian footballer

Personal information
- Date of birth: 6 November 1989 (age 37)
- Place of birth: Belgium
- Height: 1.88 m (6 ft 2 in)
- Position: Midfielder

Team information
- Current team: Gosselies Sports
- Number: 99

Youth career
- Sporting Charleroi

Senior career*
Years	Team	Apps	(Gls)
2008–2010	Sporting Charleroi	19	(0)
2010–2012	Seraing United	3	(0)
2011–2012	→ UR Namur (loan)	10	(0)
2012–2013	UR Namur		
2013–2016	Olympic Charleroi		
2016–2019	Châtelet		
2019–2020	Couvin-Mariembourg	20	(0)
2020–2022	Gosselies Sports	24	(0)
2022–2024	Brainois	46	(1)
2024–	Gosselies Sports	12	(0)

International career
2007	Belgium U21	1	(0)
- * Club domestic league appearances and goals as of 22:26, 16 November 2024 (UTC)

Jan Lella (born 6 November 1989) is a Belgian football midfielder who currently plays for Gosselies Sports.
