= Yorick Antheunis =

Belgian footballer

Personal information
- Full name: Yorick Antheunis
- Date of birth: 26 June 1991 (age 35)
- Place of birth: Belgium
- Height: 1.65 m (5 ft 5 in)
- Position: Defender

Senior career*
Years	Team	Apps	(Gls)
2008–2012	Sint-Truiden	39	(0)
2012–2014	Bocholt VV	29	(3)
2014–2015	Sporting Hasselt	15	(1)

International career
2006	Belgium U15	3	(0)
2007	Belgium U16	5	(0)
2010	Belgium U20	1	(0)
- * Club domestic league appearances and goals as of 12 October 2015

Yorique Antheunis (born 26 June 1991) is a professional football defender. He last played for Sporting Hasselt.

Prior to Bocholt, Antheunis played with Sint-Truiden, first achieving promotion from the Belgian Second Division in 2009, then three seasons in the Belgian Pro League.
