= Federico Angiulli =

Italian footballer

Personal information
- Date of birth: 4 March 1992 (age 34)
- Place of birth: Segrate, Italy
- Height: 1.76 m (5 ft 9 in)
- Positions: Left winger; left back

Team information
- Current team: Ostia Mare
- Number: 23

Youth career
- Valle d'Aosta

Senior career*
Years	Team	Apps	(Gls)
2009–2010	Valle d'Aosta	4	(0)
2010–2012	Pergocrema	28	(0)
2012–2014	Avellino	38	(2)
2014–2016	Reggiana	75	(10)
2016	Benevento	13	(4)
2017	Pisa	16	(1)
2017–2018	Ternana	24	(3)
2018–2020	Catania	23	(1)
2019–2020	→ Sambenedettese (loan)	25	(1)
2020–2021	Sambenedettese	37	(4)
2021	Triestina	3	(0)
2021–2023	Sambenedettese	45	(2)
2023–2024	L'Aquila	31	(4)
2024–	Ostia Mare	12	(2)
- * Club domestic league appearances and goals as of 17 November 2024

Federico Angiulli (born 4 March 1992) is an Italian footballer who plays for Serie D club Ostia Mare as a left winger or left defender.

== Club career ==
Born in Segrate, Angiulli made his professional debuts with Valle d'Aosta, in Serie D. After the club's bankruptcy he moved to Pergocrema, in Lega Pro Prima Divisione.

On 16 July 2012 Angiulli joined Avellino, taking part in the squad that won the 2012–13 Lega Pro Prima Divisione.

On 19 October 2013 Angiulli made his Serie B debut, coming on as a late substitute in a 4–1 home routing over Carpi.

On 23 July 2014 he was signed by Lega Pro club Reggiana in a two-year deal.

In January 2016 he was loaned to Benevento with which reached the top spot in the Pro League Group C; at the end of the fall season at Reggiana.

On 14 January 2017 official on his transfer to Pisa playing in Serie B.

On 20 July 2018, he signed with Catania. On 20 August 2019 he joined Sambenedettese on loan with an option to buy.

On 9 September 2020, Sambenedettese acquired his rights and he signed a 2-year contract.

On 27 August 2021, he moved to Triestina. Just over a month later, after Sambenedettese was re-admitted to Serie D, he returned to it.
