= England national football C team =

Football team that represents England at non-league level

England C
- Nickname(s): The Three Lions, Non-League Lions
- Association: The Football Association
- Head coach: Paul Fairclough
First colours	Second colours

The England national football C team (previously known as the England National Game XI and the England Semi-Pro national team) are the football teams that represent England at non-League level.

Formed in 1979 as the England Non-League team, it features players who play for clubs outside the Premier League and English Football League. Currently, the majority of selected players are full-time professionals with National League clubs.

Home matches are played at various League and non-league grounds across the country. They play friendly matches with equivalent teams from other nations. Between 1979 and 2008, they competed in the Four Nations Tournament each season, along with Scotland, Wales, and the full Gibraltar teams. In the tournament in 1980, held in Veenendaal in the Netherlands, the opposition was Scotland (players outside the Premier Division, notably Ally McCoist, then playing for St Johnstone), Netherlands Amateurs and Italy under-21. They have more recently begun playing against under-23 teams from the likes of Belgium and Turkey which have included players capped at full international level.

They won the Four Nations tournament for the seventh time in May 2008, winning all three of their matches without conceding a goal. Since January 2003, the team has been managed by Paul Fairclough, who used to manage Barnet until he left the club by mutual consent in December 2008.

The team has played in three International Challenge Trophy finals.

== Seasons ==
=== 2023–24 results ===
Competition	Opponents	Score	England goalscorers	Date
Friendly	Nepal	2–0	Nicke Kabamba, Callum Stead	6 May 2024
Friendly	Wales C	0–1		19 March 2024

=== 2022–23 results ===
Competition	Opponents	Score	England goalscorers	Date
Friendly	Wales C	1–0	Ryan de Havilland	21 March 2023

=== 2021–22 results ===
Competition	Opponents	Score	England goalscorers	Date
Friendly	Wales C	0–4		30 March 2022

=== 2019–20 results ===
Competition	Opponents	Score	England goalscorers	Date
Friendly	~~Nepal~~	n/a	Cancelled due to COVID-19 pandemic	25 May 2020
Friendly	~~Wales C~~	n/a	Cancelled due to COVID-19 pandemic	24 March 2020

=== 2018–19 results ===
Competition	Opponents	Score	England goalscorers	Date
Friendly	Estonia U23	0–2		5 June 2019
Friendly	Wales C	2–2	Nathan Peate (o.g.), Kurt Willoughby	20 March 2019
Friendly	Estonia U23	1–0	Alfie Pavey	10 October 2018

=== 2017–18 results ===
Competition	Opponents	Score	England goalscorers	Date
Friendly	Irish Amateurs	2–4	Luke Pennell, Tom Walker	27 May 2018
Friendly	Wales C	3–2	Fejiri Okenabirhie (3)	20 March 2018
2015–17 International Challenge Trophy	Slovakia U23	0–4		8 November 2017

=== 2016–17 results ===
Competition	Opponents	Score	England goalscorers	Date
Friendly	Jersey	1–1 (p)	Fejiri Okenabirhie	30 May 2017
Friendly	Panjab	2–1	Darren McQueen	28 May 2017
2015–17 International Challenge Trophy	Estonia U23	2–1	Elliott Whitehouse, Jamal Lowe	15 November 2016

=== 2015–16 results ===
Competition	Opponents	Score	England goalscorers	Date
2015–17 International Challenge Trophy	Slovakia U23	3–4	Jack Holland, Louis John (2)	5 June 2016
2015–17 International Challenge Trophy	Ukraine U20	2–0	Kurtis Guthrie, Kayden Jackson	22 March 2016

=== 2014–15 results ===
Competition	Opponents	Score	England goalscorers	Date
Friendly	Cyprus U21	1–2	Andy Yiadom	17 February 2015
Friendly	Estonia U23	4–2	Omar Bogle, Harry Beautyman, Andy Yiadom, Kingsley James	19 November 2014
Friendly	Turkey A2	0–2		14 September 2014

=== 2013–14 results ===
Competition	Opponents	Score	England goalscorers	Date
Friendly	Hungary U19	2–4	Matty Pearson, Matty Taylor	28 May 2014
2013–15 International Challenge Trophy	Slovakia U23	0–1		24 May 2014
Friendly	Sparta Prague B	2–2	Matty Taylor (2)	21 May 2014
Friendly	Jordan U23	1–0	Luke Berry	4 March 2014
Friendly	Czech Republic U21	2–2	Fraser Franks, James Norwood (pen)	19 November 2013
Friendly	Latvia U23	0–1		10 September 2013

=== 2012–13 results ===
Competition	Opponents	Score	England goalscorers	Date
Friendly	Bermuda	6–1	Antoni Sarcevic, Marlon Jackson, James Norwood (3), Andre Gray	4 June 2013
2011–13 International Challenge Trophy	Turkey A2	0–1		5 February 2013
2011–13 International Challenge Trophy	Belgium U23	2–1	Scott Spencer, Andre Gray	12 September 2012

=== 2011–12 results ===
Competition	Opponents	Score	England goalscorers	Date
2011–13 International Challenge Trophy	Russia U23	0–4		5 June 2012
2011–13 International Challenge Trophy	Italy Lega Pro	1–1	Adam Watkins	28 February 2012
Friendly	Gibraltar	1–3	Connor Jennings	15 November 2011

=== 2010–11 results ===
Competition	Opponents	Score	England goalscorers	Date
2009–11 International Challenge Trophy	Portugal U23	0–1		19 May 2011
2009–11 International Challenge Trophy	Belgium U23	1–0	Matthew Barnes-Homer	9 February 2011
2009–11 International Challenge Trophy	Estonia U23	1–0	Jake Howells	12 October 2010
Friendly	Wales Semi-Pro	2–2	Kyle McFadzean, Alex Rodman	14 September 2010

=== 2009–10 results ===
Competition	Opponents	Score	England goalscorers	Date
2009–11 International Challenge Trophy	Republic of Ireland U23	2–1	Andrew Fleming, Max Porter	26 May 2010
Friendly †	East of Scotland League XI	1–0	Max Porter	22 May 2010
Friendly	Poland U23	2–1	Chris Holroyd, Matthew Barnes-Homer	17 November 2009
Friendly	Hungary U23	1–1	Louis Briscoe	15 September 2009

- † Team appeared as FA Representative XI.

=== 2008–09 results ===
Competition	Opponents	Score	England goalscorers	Date
2007–09 International Challenge Trophy	Belgium U21	0–1		19 May 2009
Friendly	Malta U21	4–0	Paul Brown, Lee Tomlin, Sean Newton, Shaun Densmore	17 February 2009
2007–09 International Challenge Trophy	Italy Lega Pro	2–2	Josh Simpson, James Constable	12 Nov 2008
Friendly	Bosnia and Herzegovina B	2–6	Luke Moore, Jon Shaw	16 September 2008

=== 2007–08 results ===
Competition	Opponents	Score	England goalscorers	Date
2007–09 International Challenge Trophy	Finland	2–0	Michael Morrison, Matthew Tubbs	15 Nov 2007
2007–09 International Challenge Trophy	Wales Semi-Pro	2–1	Mitchell Cole, Michael Morrison	21 Feb 2008
Four Nations Tournament	Gibraltar	1–0	Mitchell Cole	20 May 2008
Four Nations Tournament	Scotland	1–0	Steve Morison	22 May 2008
Four Nations Tournament	Wales	3–0	Andy Burgess, Michael Morrison, Shaun Harrad	24 May 2008
Friendly	Grenada	1–1	Steve Morison	31 May 2008
Friendly	Barbados	2–0	Jon Shaw, Russell Penn	2 Jun 2008

=== 2006–07 results ===
Competition	Opponents	Score	England goalscorers	Date
2005–06 European Challenge Trophy	N'lands Amateurs U-23	4–1	Steve Morison, Kieran Charnock, George Boyd, Craig Mackail-Smith	29 Nov 2006
International Friendly	Northern Ireland	1–3	Paul Benson	13 Feb 2007
Four Nations Tournament	Republic of Ireland	5–0	Mitchell Cole (3), Glen Southam, Matthew Tubbs	22 May 2007
Four Nations Tournament	Scotland	3–0	Andy Burgess, John Grant, Jon Ashton	25 May 2007
Four Nations Tournament	Wales	3–0	Gareth Seddon (2), Mitchell Cole	27 May 2007
International Friendly	Finland	1–0	Mitchell Cole	1 June 2007

== Players ==
=== Current squad ===
The following squad was selected for a friendly fixture against Wales C on 19 March 2024.

No.	Pos.	Player	Date of birth (age)	Caps	Goals	Club
	GK	Grant Smith	20 November 1993 (age 32)	2	0	(The Football Association) Bromley
	GK	Wyll Stanway	21 May 2001 (age 25)	0	0	(The Football Association) Chester
	DF	Gus Scott-Morriss	8 May 1997 (age 29)	1	0	(The Football Association) Southend United
	DF	Tom Eastman	21 October 1991 (age 35)	0	0	(The Football Association) Dagenham & Redbridge
	DF	Jamie Grimes	22 December 1990 (age 35)	0	0	(The Football Association) Chesterfield
	DF	Ollie Harfield	9 January 1998 (age 28)	0	0	(The Football Association) Aldershot Town
	DF	Myles Kenlock	26 November 1996 (age 29)	0	0	(The Football Association) Ebbsfleet United
	MF	Edward Francis	11 September 1999 (age 27)	0	0	(The Football Association) Gateshead
	MF	Isaac Marriott	11 October 1999 (age 27)	0	0	(The Football Association) Altrincham
	MF	Callum Maycock	23 December 1997 (age 28)	0	0	(The Football Association) Solihull Moors
	MF	Dan Pybus	12 December 1997 (age 28)	0	0	(The Football Association) Dorking Wanderers
	MF	Reece Smith	28 April 2002 (age 24)	0	0	(The Football Association) Maidenhead United
	FW	Emmanuel Dieseruvwe	20 February 1995 (age 31)	0	0	(The Football Association) Hartlepool United
	FW	Paul McCallum	28 July 1993 (age 33)	0	0	(The Football Association) Eastleigh
	FW	Ollie Pearce	8 August 1995 (age 31)	0	0	(The Football Association) Worthing
	FW	Callum Stead	25 December 1999 (age 26)	0	0	(The Football Association) Barnet

== Managers ==
- Paul Fairclough (2003–)
- Steve Avory (2002–2003)
- John Owens (1997–2002)
- Keith Wright (1982–1985)
- Howard Wilkinson (1979–1982)

== Notable players ==
See: England semi-pro international footballers.

== Honours ==
- Four Nations Tournament (7): 1979, 1981, 1983, 2003, 2005, 2007, 2008
- European Challenge Trophy (1): 2006

== See also ==
- England national football team
- England national football B team
- English football league system
