= Wales national semi-professional football team =

International team consisting of Cymru Premier league players

Wales 'C' National Team
- Nickname: The Dragons (Welsh: Y Dreigiau)
- Association: Football Association of Wales (FAW)
- Head coach: (Wales) Mark Jones
First colours	Second colours

The Wales 'C' National Team is a football team that represents the Football Association of Wales governed Welsh football league system. The team is selected using players that play in the Cymru Premier, the highest level of Welsh football.

Home matches are played at various grounds around the country. The Wales Semi Pro team competed in both the Four Nations Tournament and the International Challenge Trophy.

== Recent results ==
Win Draw Loss

20 March 2018 Friendly	Wales C	2-3	England C	Barry, Wales
19:30 UTC	Jones 57'; Venables 77'	Report	Okenabirhie 9', 52', 75'	Stadium: Jenner Park; Referee: Tim Marshall

19 March 2019 Friendly	England C	2-2	Wales C	Salford, England
19:45 UTC	Peate 24' (o.g.); Willoughby 52'	Report	McLaggon 31'; Roscrow 63'	Stadium: Moor Lane; Referee: David Munro

30 March 2022 Friendly	Wales C	4-0	England C	Caernarfon, Wales
14:30 UTC	Evans 11', 34'; Edwards 20', 25'	Report		Stadium: The Oval; Referee: Tim Marshall

21 March 2023 Friendly	England C	1-0	Wales C	Altrincham, England
19:45 UTC	de Havilland 45+1'	Report		Stadium: Moss Lane

19 March 2024 Friendly	Wales C	1-0	England C	Llanelli, Wales
19:45 UTC	Bradley 45+3'	Report		Stadium: Stebonheath Park

== Players ==
=== Current squad ===
Squad to face England C at Llanelli Town on 19 March 2024.

Name	Club
Kelland Absolom	(Wales) Bala Town
Connor Roberts	(Wales) The New Saints
Rhys Abbruzzese	(Wales) Haverfordwest County
Danny Davies	(Wales) The New Saints
Mael Davies	(Wales) Penybont
Lee Jenkins	(Wales) Haverfordwest County
Emlyn Lewis	(Wales) Cardiff Metropolitan University
Kane Owen	(Wales) Penybont
Ryan Sears	(Wales) Newtown
Sion Bradley	(Wales) Caernarfon Town
Noah Edwards	(Wales) Connah's Quay Nomads
Danny Gosset	(Wales) Caernarfon Town
Clayton Green	(Wales) Pontypridd United
Tom Price	(Wales) Cardiff Metropolitan University
Josh Williams	(Wales) Connah's Quay Nomads
Ben Ahmun	(Wales) Pontypridd United
Ethan Cann	(Wales) Llanelli Town
Gwion Dafydd	(Wales) The New Saints
Jordan Davies	(Wales) Connah's Quay Nomads
Sam Jones	(Wales) Cardiff Metropolitan University

== Managers ==
- (Wales) Mark Jones (2018–present)
- (Wales) Terry Boyle (2008–20??)
- (Wales) Tony Pennock (2003–2008)

== Notable players ==
- Will Evans
- Rhys Griffiths
- Neil Taylor

== Honours ==
- Four Nations Tournament Winners: 2002, 2004, 2006
- Four Nations Tournament Runners-up: 2007, 2008
