= Italy national football C team =

National association football team

Italy national football C teams (Italian: Squadre Rappresentative della Lega Italiana Calcio Professionistico) are the Italy national football team representative teams of Serie C (in the past Lega Pro Prima Divisione and Seconda Divisione). They are controlled by the Lega Italiana Calcio Professionistico and consist of U19, U20 and U21 teams.

The under-20 team is the B team of the Italy national under-20 football team and the U21 team is the C team of the Italy national under-21 football team; they also serve as feeder teams of the main team in the youth teams pyramid.

Some players also capped for the main team after played for the Lega Pro team and some players are called up to the Lega Pro team after appearing for Italy national under-19 football team.

The team also compete against representative teams of Group A, B and C of Seconda Divisione in annual Lega Pro Quadrangular Tournament, however it was cancelled in 2011–12 season, as there are only 4 groups from the two divisions of Lega Pro.

Recently, the regulation defined the team to be exclusive to Serie C owned players; players on loan from Serie A and B were excluded.

== Recent results ==
=== 2013–15 International Challenge Trophy ===
19 November 2013

Italy Lega Pro	2–2	Norway
Gammone; Scaccabarozzi	(Report)	Barmen; Kastrati

Stadio Paolo Mazza, Ferrara

5 March 2014

Italy Lega Pro	1–0	Ukraine
Forte	(Report)

Stadio Giovanni Zini, Cremona

14 October 2014

Czech Republic	0–1	Italy Lega Pro
	(Report)	Ganz

Ďolíček, Prague

25 March 2015

Italy Lega Pro	3–5	Turkey A2
	(Report)

=== 2012–13 Under 20 Regional Competition ===
10 October 2012

Italy Lega Pro	4–2	Croatia U-20
Montini 64'; Benedetti 71'; Degeri 72'; Pontiggia 90'	(Report)	Brozović 35' (pen.), 78'

Portogruaro, Italy

7 February 2013

Croatia U-20	3–1	Italy Lega Pro
Brozovic 35'; Caktas 50'; Mitrovic 85'	(Report)	Montini 80'

Umag, Croatia

6 March 2013

Italy Lega Pro	4–1	Slovenia U-20
Vita 23', 82'; Montini 44' (pen.), 48'	(Report)	Plos 25'

Trieste, Italy

20 March 2013

Slovenia U-20	2–0	Italy Lega Pro
Benedicic 29'; Pucko 51'	(Report)

Ajdovščina, Slovenia

=== 2011–13 International Challenge Trophy ===
Lega Pro used entire squad of born 1991 or after in 2011–12 season

30 November 2011

Belgium U-23	2–2	Italy Lega Pro
Van Eenoo; Saglik	(Report) (report)	Degeri; Puntoriere

La Louviere, Belgium

28 February 2012

England C	1–1	Italy Lega Pro
90+ Adam Watkins	(Report) (Report)	48' Angiulli

Highbury Stadium, Fleetwood
Attendance: 4,628

14 November 2012

Italy Lega Pro	1–1	Russia
Proietti 32'	(Report)	Bolov 60'

Frosinone, Italy

=== 2009–11 International Challenge Trophy ===
2 December 2009

Malta U-23	1–3	Italy Lega Pro U-21
73' Bahagiar	(Report)	8' F.Poli; 19' Scapuzzi; 39' Verratti

Malta

10 March 2010

Romania U-23	0–0	Italy Lega Pro U-21
	(Report)

Romania

10 November 2010

Italy Lega Pro U-21	4–1	Belgium U-23
	(Report)

Italy

23 March 2011

Italy Lega Pro U-21	2–3 (aet)	Portugal U-23
	(Report)

Italy

=== 2008–09 Mirop Cup ===
- 17 February 2010 Slovenia 0–0 draw (U20 team, class 1989)
- 4 November 2009: Slovenia 0–4 loss (U20 team, class 1989)

- 1 April 2009: Slovakia 0–4 loss (U20 team, class 1988)
- 4 March 2009: Croatia 1–2 loss (U20 team, class 1988)
- 11 February 2009: Hungary 3–0 win (U20 team, class 1988)
- 3 December 2008: Slovakia 1–1 draw (U20 team, class 1988)
- 22 October 2008: Croatia 2–1 win (U20 team, class 1988)
- 1 October 2008: Hungary 1–2 loss (U20 team, class 1988)

=== 2007–09 International Challenge Trophy ===
14 November 2007

Italy Lega Pro U-21	4–2	Wales Semi Pro
9 Dionisi; 47 60 Sarno; 55 Oliveiri	(Report)	76 Edwards; 81 Price

Stadio Franco Ossola, Varese, Italy

2 April 2008

Finland U-23	2–1	Italy Lega Pro U-21
41 Perovuo; 65 Hetemaj	(Report)	85 pen Vincenzo Pepe

Finnair Stadium, Helsinki, Finland

12 November 2008

Italy Lega Pro U-21	2–2	England C
36 Dionisi; 71 Statella	(Report)	58 Simpson; 82 James Constable

Stadio Santa Colomba, Benevento, Italy

=== 2006–07 Mirop Cup ===
- 28 March 2007 Hungary 1–1 draw
- 7 March 2007 Croatia 2–1 win
- 15 November 2006 Hungary 1–1 draw
- 25 October 2006 Slovenia 2–3 loss
- 11 October 2006 Slovakia 1–1 draw
- 29 March 2006 Slovakia 0–0 draw
- 15 March 2006 Croatia 0–6 loss
- 1 March 2006 Slovenia 1–0 win

=== 2005–06 European Challenge Trophy ===
30 November 2005

(Netherlands) N'lands Amateurs U-23	2–1	Italy Lega Pro U-21
Jongsma; Vink	(Report)	Lunardini

FC Lisse, Lisse, Netherlands

15 February 2006

England C	3–0	Italy Lega Pro U-21
4 Andy Bishop; 78 Chris Blackburn; 85 Craig Mackail-Smith	(Report)	33' Ferrario

Abbey Stadium, Cambridge, England

29 November 2006

Italy Lega Pro U-21	0–1	Belgium U-21
	(Report)	8 Sanchez

Stadio Porta Elisa, Lucca, Italy

=== 2004–05 Mirop Cup ===
- 14 December 2005 Croatia 2–1 win

http://www.lega-calcio-serie-c.it/it/Comunicati/Comunic2005/Lega/Lega%20289.pdf

=== 2002–03 Mirop Cup ===
http://www.lega-calcio-serie-c.it/it/Comunicati/Comunic2004/Lega/Lega228.pdf

=== Friendlies ===
- 14 February 2007 Belgium 3–1 won

- 12 June 2011 Palestine Lost 0-3

- 23 November 2011 Palestine 1–0 (U21 team; class 1990)

- 12 June 2012 San Marino 8–0 (U20 team; class 1992)

- 29 November 2012 Oman

- 20 February 2013 Oman

- 11 March 2015 North Korea

== See also ==
- Italy national football B team
