= 2019–20 Tranmere Rovers F.C. season =

Tranmere Rovers
2019–20 season
- Chairman: Mark Palios
- Manager: Micky Mellon
- Stadium: Prenton Park
- EFL League One: 21st (relegated)
- FA Cup: Fourth round
- EFL Cup: First round
- EFL Trophy: Third round
- Top goalscorer: League: Morgan Ferrier (4); All: Morgan Ferrier (8)
Home colours	Away colours

The 2019–20 season was Tranmere Rovers' 136th season of existence and their first back in EFL League One in five years after successive promotions from the 2017–18 National League and the 2018–19 EFL League Two. Along with competing in League One, the club participated in the FA Cup, EFL Cup and EFL Trophy.

The season covers the period from 1 July 2019 to 30 June 2020.

== Transfers ==
=== Transfers in ===
Date from	Position	Nationality	Name	From	Fee	Ref.
1 July 2019	RW	(England)	Corey Blackett-Taylor	(England) Aston Villa	Free transfer	
1 July 2019	RW	(England)	Kieron Morris	(England) Walsall	Free transfer	
1 July 2019	CB	(England)	Sid Nelson	(England) Millwall	Free transfer	
1 July 2019	CF	(England)	Stefan Payne	(England) Bristol Rovers	Free transfer	
1 July 2019	CM	(Republic of Ireland)	Darren Potter	(England) Rotherham United	Free transfer	
1 July 2019	CB	(Wales)	George Ray	(England) Crewe Alexandra	Free transfer	
1 July 2019	RB	(England)	Calum Woods	(England) Bradford City	Free transfer	
1 August 2019	CF	(England)	Morgan Ferrier	(England) Walsall	Undisclosed	
19 September 2019	CM	(Guyana)	Neil Danns	(England) Bury	Free transfer	
1 January 2020	CB	(England)	Peter Clarke	(England) Fleetwood Town	Free transfer	
6 January 2020	DM	(Northern Ireland)	Luke McCullough	(England) Doncaster Rovers	Free transfer	
31 January 2020	CF	(England)	Andy Cook	(England) Mansfield Town	Undisclosed	

=== Loans in ===
Date from	Position	Nationality	Name	From	Date until	Ref.
10 July 2019	CF	(England)	Jordan Ponticelli	(England) Coventry City	10 January 2020	
2 August 2019	CF	(England)	Rushian Hepburn-Murphy	(England) Aston Villa	31 January 2020	
8 August 2019	AM	(England)	Jacob Maddox	(England) Chelsea	January 2020	
9 August 2019	RB	(England)	Kane Wilson	(England) West Bromwich Albion	30 June 2020	
2 September 2019	LB	(England)	Cameron Borthwick-Jackson	(England) Manchester United	January 2020	
14 December 2019	GK	(England)	Aaron Chapman	(England) Peterborough United	21 December 2019	
3 January 2020	CM	(England)	Alex Woodyard	(England) Peterborough United	30 June 2020	
29 January 2020	CF	(England)	James Vaughan	(England) Bradford City	30 June 2020	
30 January 2020	CB	(England)	Morgan Feeney	(England) Everton	30 June 2020	

=== Loans out ===
Date from	Position	Nationality	Name	To	Date until	Ref.
31 January 2020	CF	(England)	Paul Mullin	(England) Cambridge United	30 June 2020	

=== Transfers out ===
Date from	Position	Nationality	Name	To	Fee	Ref.
1 July 2019	RB	(England)	Adam Buxton	(England) Morecambe	Free transfer	
1 July 2019	CM	(England)	James Devine	(England) Marine	Released	
1 July 2019	CB	(England)	Steve McNulty	(England) York City	Released	
1 July 2019	CF	(England)	James Norwood	(England) Ipswich Town	Free transfer	
1 July 2019	CF	(England)	Cole Stockton	(England) Morecambe	Free transfer	
1 July 2019	CM	(England)	Ben Tollitt	(England) Blackpool	Released	
1 July 2019	GK	(England)	Paddy Wharton	(England) FC United of Manchester	Released	
1 August 2019	LB	(Republic of Ireland)	Zoumana Bakayogo	(England) Notts County	Free transfer	
1 August 2019	CM	(England)	Jay Harris	(England) Macclesfield Town	Free transfer	
7 November 2019	DF	(England)	Ben Kerr	(England) FC United of Manchester	Free transfer	

== Pre-season ==
The Whites announced pre-season friendlies against Liverpool, Stoke City, Carlisle United and Walsall.

6 July 2019 Friendly	Tranmere Rovers	1–2	Livingston	St Andrews, Scotland
15:00 BST	Mullin 50'	Report	Dykes (penalty missed) 41'; Pittman 45'; Menga 75'	Stadium: University of St Andrews

11 July 2019 Friendly	Tranmere Rovers	0–6	Liverpool	Birkenhead
19:30 BST		Report	Clyne 6'; Brewster 38', 45'; Jones 54'; Origi 60'; Duncan 68'	Stadium: Prenton Park

20 July 2019 Friendly	Tranmere Rovers	0–2	Stoke City	Birkenhead
15:00 BST		Report	Smith 54'; Batth 85'	Stadium: Prenton Park

23 July 2019 Friendly	Carlisle United	3–0	Tranmere Rovers	Carlisle
19:30 BST	Thomas 20', 40'; Bell 69'	Report		Stadium: Brunton Park

27 July 2019 Friendly	Tranmere Rovers	0–0	Walsall	Birkenhead
15:00 BST		Report		Stadium: Prenton Park

== Competitions ==
=== EFL League One ===
==== League table ====
Pos	Team	Pld	W	D	L	GF	GA	GD	Pts	PPG	Promotion, qualification or relegation
17	Accrington Stanley	35	10	10	15	47	53	−6	40	1.14	
18	Rochdale	34	10	6	18	39	57	−18	36	1.06	
19	Milton Keynes Dons	35	10	7	18	36	47	−11	37	1.06	
20	AFC Wimbledon	35	8	11	16	39	52	−13	35	1.00	
21	Tranmere Rovers (R)	34	8	8	18	36	60	−24	32	0.94	Relegation to EFL League Two
22	Southend United (R)	35	4	7	24	39	85	−46	19	0.54	Relegation to EFL League Two
23	Bolton Wanderers (R)	34	5	11	18	27	66	−39	14 (Note: Bolton Wanderers deducted 12 points for entering administration.)	0.41	Relegation to EFL League Two
24	Bury	0	0	0	0	0	0	0	−12 (Note: Bury deducted 12 points for entering into an insolvency event, before later being expelled from the EFL on 27 August 2019. At the time of their expulsion, they had played no matches.)	—	Club expelled

Source: EFL Official Website
Rules for classification: 1) Points per game; 2) Goal difference; 3) Number of goals scored; 4) Head-to-head results; 5) Wins; 6) Away goals; 7) Penalty points (sec 9.5); 8) 12-point sending-off offences
(R) Relegated

==== Results summary ====
Overall								Home						Away					
Pld	W	D	L	GF	GA	GD	Pts	W	D	L	GF	GA	GD	W	D	L	GF	GA	GD
34	8	8	18	36	60	−24	32	3	6	8	19	26	−7	5	2	10	17	34	−17

Last updated: 10 March 2020.
Source: BBC

==== Results by matchday ====
Matchday	1	2	3	4	5	6	7	8	9	10	11	12	13	14	15	16	17	18	19	20	21	22	23	24	25	26	27	28	29	30	31	32	33	34
Ground	H	A	H	A	A	H	A	H	H	A	H	A	H	A	H	H	A	H	A	H	A	H	H	A	H	H	A	H	H	H	A	A	A	A
Result	L	L	W	L	D	D	L	D	W	L	L	W	D	L	W	L	L	D	L	W	L	D	L	D	L	L	L	L	L	D	L	W	W	W
Position	15	20	13	18	19	17	19	19	18	20	20	18	19	20	18	18	20	20	20	20	20	20	21	21	21	21	21	21	21	21	21	21	21	21

Updated to match(es) played on 7 March 2020. Source: Statto.com
A = Away; H = Home; W = Win; D = Draw; L = Loss

==== Matches ====
On Thursday, 20 June 2019, the EFL League One fixtures were revealed.

3 August 2019 1	Tranmere Rovers	2–3	Rochdale	Birkenhead
15:00 BST	Jennings (yellow card) 45+2' (goal) 90+3'; Banks (yellow card) 53'; Dooley 89' (o.g.); Hepburn-Murphy (red card) 90+4'	Report	Henderson 12' (pen.), 48'; Rathbone (yellow card) 41'; Sanchez (yellow card) 58'; Norrington-Davies 69'; Williams (yellow card) 90+4'	Stadium: Prenton Park; Attendance: 8,032; Referee: Anthony Backhouse

10 August 2019 2	Portsmouth	2–0	Tranmere Rovers	Milton
15:00 BST	Close 27'; Naylor (yellow card) 48' (goal) 75'; Downing (yellow card) 90'	Report		Stadium: Fratton Park; Attendance: 18,575; Referee: Scott Oldham

17 August 2019 3	Tranmere Rovers	5–0	Bolton Wanderers	Birkenhead
15:00 BST	Ferrier (yellow card) 28'; Banks 38'; Ferrier 40', 46'; Jennings 63'; Ray (yellow card) 72'; Payne 75'; Mullin (yellow card) 80'	Report	Brockbank (yellow card) 36'; Zouma (yellow card) 67'	Stadium: Prenton Park; Attendance: 8,568; Referee: Charles Breakspear

20 August 2019 4	Bristol Rovers	2–0	Tranmere Rovers	Horfield
19:45 BST	Clarke-Harris 38'; Smith 88' (pen.)	Report		Stadium: Memorial Stadium; Attendance: 6,802; Referee: Gavin Ward

31 August 2019 5	Rotherham United	1–1	Tranmere Rovers	Rotherham
15:00 BST	Wiles 73'; Ogbene (yellow card) 89'	Report	Payne (yellow card) 45' (goal) 90+5'; Nelson (yellow card) 90+6'; Mullin (yellow card) 90+7'	Stadium: AESSEAL New York Stadium; Attendance: 8,691; Referee: Andy Haines

7 September 2019 6	Tranmere Rovers	2–2	Gillingham	Birkenhead
15:00 BST	Payne (yellow card) 38'; Mullin (penalty missed) 66' 70'; Jennings 67'	Report	Byrne (yellow card) 14'; Jakubiak 16'; Jones 36'	Stadium: Prenton Park; Attendance: 6,687; Referee: Michael Salisbury

14 September 2019 7	Oxford United	3–0	Tranmere Rovers	Oxford
15:00 BST	Henry 23' (pen.), 90+2' (pen.); Dickie (yellow card) 51'; Woodburn (yellow card) 63'; Brannagan 70'	Report	Woods (yellow card) 26'; Nelson (yellow card) 57'	Stadium: The Kassam Stadium; Attendance: 6,294; Referee: Rob Lewis

17 September 2019 8	Tranmere Rovers	2–2	Peterborough United	Birkenhead
19:45 BST	Ridehalgh 65'; Banks 70'; Potter (yellow card) 82'	Report	Eisa 54'; Toney 56'; Mason (yellow card) 85'; Reed (yellow card) 90+4'	Stadium: Prenton Park; Attendance: 5,243; Referee: Tom Nield

21 September 2019 9	Tranmere Rovers	2–1	Burton Albion	Birkenhead
15:00 BST	Banks (yellow card) 60' (goal) 90+2'; Borthwick-Jackson (yellow card) 66'; Payne 90+5'	Report	Wallace (yellow card) 16'; Akins 66' (pen.); O'Hara (yellow card) 78'; Hutchinson (yellow card) 86'	Stadium: Prenton Park; Attendance: 6,235; Referee: Alan Young

28 September 2019 10	Ipswich Town	4–1	Tranmere Rovers	Ipswich
15:00 BST	Garbutt 35'; Jackson 48'; Nolan 62'; Norwood (yellow card) 68'; Vincent-Young 70'	Report	Potter (yellow card) 33'; Payne 39' (yellow card) 47'	Stadium: Portman Road; Attendance: 19,785; Referee: Ben Toner

5 October 2019 11	Tranmere Rovers	0–1	Shrewsbury Town	Birkenhead
15:00 BST	Jennings (yellow card) 19' (yellow-red card) 45+3'; Danns (yellow card) 22'	Report	Lang 20'; Laurent (yellow card) 28'; Walker (yellow card) 90+2'	Stadium: Prenton Park; Attendance: 7,314 (948 Away); Referee: Craig Hicks

13 October 2019 12	Coventry City	0–1	Tranmere Rovers	Bordesley
12:00 BST	Dabo (yellow card) 39'	Report	Payne (yellow card) 38'; Hepburn-Murphy (yellow card) 59'; Davies (yellow card) 70'; Blackett-Taylor 83'	Stadium: St Andrew's Trillion Trophy Stadium; Attendance: 5,658; Referee: Darren Drysdale

18 October 2019 13	Tranmere Rovers	1–1	Southend United	Birkenhead
19:45 BST	Monthé (yellow card) 68'; Mullin 85' (pen.)	Report	Hopper 9'; McLaughlin (yellow card) 64'; Shaughnessy (yellow card) 81'; Dieng (yellow card) 90+4'	Stadium: Prenton Park; Attendance: 7,066; Referee: David Webb

22 October 2019 14	Sunderland	5–0	Tranmere Rovers	Sunderland
19:45 BST	Dobson (yellow card) 10'; Watmore 24'; Maguire 26'; Gooch 39'; Grigg 83'; O'Nien 90'	Report	Ray (yellow card) 25'; Payne (yellow card) 40'	Stadium: Stadium of Light; Attendance: 28,551; Referee: Carl Boyeson

2 November 2019 15	Milton Keynes Dons	1–3	Tranmere Rovers	Denbigh
15:00 GMT	Reeves 42'; Agard (red card) 45'; Walsh (yellow card) 73'; McGrandles (yellow card) 78'	Report	Hepburn-Murphy 19', 53', 69'; Jennings (yellow card) 45+2'; Monthé (yellow card) 58'; Mullin (yellow card) 83'	Stadium: Stadium MK; Attendance: 7,171; Referee: Matt Donohue

17 November 2019 16	Tranmere Rovers	0–2	Wycombe Wanderers	Birkenhead
12:00 GMT	Ridehalgh (yellow card) 32'; Potter (yellow card) 65'	Report	Akinfenwa 43'; Jacobson 45+1' (pen.); Grimmer (yellow card) 47'; Thompson (yellow card) 71'	Stadium: Prenton Park; Attendance: 5,460; Referee: John Busby

23 November 2019 17	Fleetwood Town	2–1	Tranmere Rovers	Fleetwood
15:00 GMT	Morris 15'; Madden 82'	Report	Mullin 87'	Stadium: Highbury Stadium; Attendance: 3,811; Referee: Josh Smith

7 December 2019 18	Tranmere Rovers	1–1	Accrington Stanley	Birkenhead
15:00 GMT	Morris 38'	Report	McConville 18'; Rodgers (yellow card) 35'	Stadium: Prenton Park; Attendance: 5,751; Referee: Tony Harrington

14 December 2019 19	Lincoln City	1–0	Tranmere Rovers	Lincoln
15:00 GMT	Bostwick (yellow card) 18'; Akinde (yellow card) 49' (goal) 77'; Chapman (yellow card) 65'	Report	Blackett-Taylor (yellow card) 36' (yellow-red card) 40'	Stadium: Sincil Bank; Attendance: 8,369; Referee: Carl Boyeson

21 December 2019 20	Tranmere Rovers	1–0	AFC Wimbledon	Birkenhead
15:00 GMT	Hepburn-Murphy 26'; Nelson (yellow card) 48'; Perkins (yellow card) 90+3'	Report		Stadium: Prenton Park; Attendance: 6,285; Referee: Scott Oldham

26 December 2019 21	Burton Albion	4–2	Tranmere Rovers	Burton upon Trent
15:00 GMT	Fraser 12'; Buxton (yellow card) 30'; Quinn (yellow card) 41'; Akins 50'; Boyce 60', 86'	Report	Ferrier 26'; Morris (yellow card) 45+2' (goal) 64'; Danns (yellow card) 90+4'	Stadium: Pirelli Stadium; Attendance: 3,970; Referee: Oliver Yates

29 December 2019 22	Tranmere Rovers	1–1	Blackpool	Birkenhead
15:00 GMT	Ferrier 43'	Report	Heneghan 10'; Husband (yellow card) 26'; Edwards (yellow card) 38'; Turton (yellow card) 63'; Spearing (yellow card) 85'	Stadium: Prenton Park; Attendance: 8,487; Referee: Tom Nield

1 January 2020 23	Tranmere Rovers	1–4	Coventry City	Birkenhead
15:00 GMT	Morris (yellow card) 24'; Jennings 35'; Ferrier (penalty missed) 54'	Report	Godden 3', 67', 90+2' (pen.); Shipley 17'	Stadium: Prenton Park; Attendance: 7,828; Referee: Will Finnie

11 January 2020 24	Southend United	0–0	Tranmere Rovers	Southend-on-Sea
15:00 GMT	Demetriou (yellow card) 78'	Report	Monthé (yellow card) 16'; Mullin (yellow card) 40'; Clarke (yellow card) 41'; Danns (yellow card) 66'; Ferrier (yellow card) 84'	Stadium: Roots Hall; Attendance: 5,988; Referee: Alan Young

18 January 2020 25	Tranmere Rovers	1–2	Ipswich Town	Birkenhead
15:00 GMT	Monthé 32' (yellow card) 71'; Perkins (yellow card) 36'; Danns (yellow card) 65'	Report	Norris (yellow card) 32'; Downes 55'; Huws (yellow card) 68'; Jackson 79'	Stadium: Prenton Park; Attendance: 7,921; Referee: John Busby

29 January 2020 26	Tranmere Rovers	0–1	Sunderland	Birkenhead
19:45 GMT	Monthé (yellow card) 74' (yellow-red card) 84'; Wilson (yellow card) 77'; Jennings (yellow card) 90'	Report	Dobson (yellow card) 24'; Lynch (yellow card) 48'; Wyke 60'; Maguire (yellow card) 88'	Stadium: Prenton Park; Attendance: 6,850; Referee: Antony Coggins

1 February 2020 27	Bolton Wanderers	2–0	Tranmere Rovers	Horwich
15:00 GMT	Politic 2'; O'Grady 64'; Bryan (yellow card) 69'	Report		Stadium: University of Bolton Stadium; Attendance: 13,044; Referee: Scott Oldham

4 February 2020 28	Tranmere Rovers	0–3	Doncaster Rovers	Birkenhead
19:45 GMT	Cook (yellow card) 90+2'	Report	Wright (yellow card) 51'; Ramsey 54', 75'; John (yellow card) 59'; Halliday (yellow card) 61'; Okenabirhie 84'	Stadium: Prenton Park; Attendance: 5,464; Referee: Leigh Doughty

8 February 2020 29	Tranmere Rovers	0–2	Portsmouth	Birkenhead
15:00 GMT	Vaughan (yellow card) 31'	Report	Raggett 13'; Williams 51' (yellow card) 77'; Bass (yellow card) 70'	Stadium: Prenton Park; Attendance: 6,985; Referee: Michael Salisbury

11 February 2020 30	Tranmere Rovers	0–0	Bristol Rovers	Birkenhead
19:45 GMT	Ferrier (yellow card) 82'; Nelson (yellow card) 88'	Report	Ogogo (yellow card) 88'; Upson (yellow card) 89'	Stadium: Prenton Park; Attendance: 5,026; Referee: Neil Hair

22 February 2020 31	Wycombe Wanderers	3–1	Tranmere Rovers	High Wycombe
15:00 GMT	Stewart 45+1'; Thompson (yellow card) 55'; Akinfenwa 71'; Jacobson 90+2' (pen.)	Report	McCullough (yellow card) 29'; Cook (yellow card) 31'; Vaughan 63'; Clarke (yellow card) 66'; Davies (yellow card) 90+1'	Stadium: Adams Park; Attendance: 4,756; Referee: Charles Breakspear

25 February 2020 32	Shrewsbury Town	2–3	Tranmere Rovers	Shrewsbury
19:45 GMT	Pierre 56'; Lang 61'; Beckles (yellow card) 76'	Report	Ellis 9'; Woodyard 14'; Vaughan (yellow card) 27'; Wilson (yellow card) 41'; Ridehalgh (yellow card) 81'; Blackett-Taylor 90+5'	Stadium: Montgomery Waters Meadow; Attendance: 5,009; Referee: James Oldham

7 March 2020 33	Accrington Stanley	1–2	Tranmere Rovers	Accrington
15:00 GMT	Rodgers (yellow card) 39' (yellow-red card) 90+3'; Finley (yellow card) 72'; Woodyard 82' (o.g.)	Report	Vaughan 8'; Jennings (yellow card) 34'; Ellis 77'; Ridehalgh (yellow card) 79'; Davies (yellow card) 88'	Stadium: Wham Stadium; Attendance: 2,881; Referee: Will Finnie

10 March 2020 34	Blackpool	1–2	Tranmere Rovers	Blackpool
19:45 GMT	Heneghan (yellow card) 32'; Dewsbury-Hall 58'; Macdonald (yellow card) 75'	Report	Woodyard (yellow card) 24'; Ferrier 37'; Vaughan 45+1'	Stadium: Bloomfield Road; Attendance: 8,235; Referee: Sebastian Stockbridge

14 March 2020	Tranmere Rovers	v	Lincoln City	Birkenhead
15:00 GMT				Stadium: Prenton Park
Note: Season was suspended until 3 April 2020, due to the COVID-19 pandemic.

17 March 2020	Rochdale	v	Tranmere Rovers	Spotland
19:45 GMT				Stadium: Crown Oil Arena
Note: Season was suspended until 3 April 2020, due to the COVID-19 pandemic.

21 March 2020	AFC Wimbledon	v	Tranmere Rovers	Norbiton
15:00 GMT				Stadium: The Cherry Red Records Stadium
Note: Season was suspended until 3 April 2020, due to the COVID-19 pandemic.

28 March 2020	Tranmere Rovers	v	Milton Keynes Dons	Birkenhead
15:00 GMT				Stadium: Prenton Park
Note: Season was suspended until 3 April 2020, due to the COVID-19 pandemic.

4 April 2020	Doncaster Rovers	v	Tranmere Rovers	Doncaster
15:00 BST				Stadium: Keepmoat Stadium
Note: On 3 April, the English Football League decided to postpone all football until safe to do so due to the COVID-19 pandemic.

13 April 2020	Tranmere Rovers	v	Rotherham United	Birkenhead
13:00 BST				Stadium: Prenton Park
Note: On 3 April, the English Football League decided to postpone all football until safe to do so due to the COVID-19 pandemic.

18 April 2020	Gillingham	v	Tranmere Rovers	Gillingham
15:00 BST				Stadium: Priestfield Stadium
Note: On 3 April, the English Football League decided to postpone all football until safe to do so due to the COVID-19 pandemic.

25 April 2020	Tranmere Rovers	v	Oxford United	Birkenhead
15:00 BST				Stadium: Prenton Park
Note: On 3 April, the English Football League decided to postpone all football until safe to do so due to the COVID-19 pandemic.

3 May 2020	Peterborough United	v	Tranmere Rovers	Peterborough
15:00 BST				Stadium: Weston Homes Stadium
Note: On 3 April, the English Football League decided to postpone all football until safe to do so due to the COVID-19 pandemic.

=== FA Cup ===
The first round draw was made on 21 October 2019. The second round draw was made live on 11 November from Chichester City's stadium, Oaklands Park. The third round draw was made live on BBC Two from Etihad Stadium, Micah Richards and Tony Adams conducted the draw.

9 November 2019 First round	Tranmere Rovers	2–2	Wycombe Wanderers	Birkenhead
15:00 GMT	Morris 3', 67'	Report	Jacobson 26'; Samuel 55'; Charles (yellow card) 86'	Stadium: Prenton Park; Referee: Martin Coy

20 November 2019 First round replay	Wycombe Wanderers	1–2 (a.e.t.)	Tranmere Rovers	High Wycombe
19:45 GMT	Stewart 45'; Phillips (yellow card) 98'	Report	Ferrier (yellow card) 32' (goal) 55'; Wilson (red card) 41'; Davies (yellow card) 57'; Monthé (yellow card) 71'; Morris 115'	Stadium: Adams Park; Attendance: 2,928; Referee: Graham Salisbury

1 December 2019 Second round	Tranmere Rovers	5–1	Chichester City	Birkenhead
15:00 GMT	Blackett-Taylor 62', 85'; Ferrier 64', 71', 75'; Jennings (yellow card) 81'	Report	Horncastle (yellow card) 57'; Peake 90+1'	Stadium: Prenton Park; Attendance: 4,370; Referee: Darren Drysdale

4 January 2020 Third round	Watford	3–3	Tranmere Rovers	Watford
15:00 GMT	Dele-Bashiru 12'; Chalobah 14'; Pereyra 34'	Report	Jennings 65'; Monthé 78'; Mullin 87' (pen.)	Stadium: Vicarage Road; Attendance: 14,373; Referee: Graham Scott

14 January 2020 Third round replay	Tranmere Rovers	v	Watford	Birkenhead
19:45 GMT		Report		Stadium: Prenton Park
Note: The fixture was postponed due to a waterlogged pitch.

23 January 2020 Third round replay	Tranmere Rovers	2–1 (a.e.t.)	Watford	Birkenhead
19:45 GMT	Monthé 36'; Jennings (yellow card) 55', (goal) 104'	Report	Hinds 68'	Stadium: Prenton Park; Referee: Tony Harrington

26 January 2020 Fourth round	Tranmere Rovers	0–6	Manchester United	Birkenhead
15:00 GMT	Davies (yellow card) 55'	Report	Jones (yellow card) 4' (goal) 41'; Maguire 10'; Dalot 13'; Lingard 16'; Martial 45'; Greenwood 56' (pen.)	Stadium: Prenton Park; Referee: Lee Mason

=== EFL Cup ===
The first round draw was conducted on 20 June.

13 August 2019 First round	Tranmere Rovers	0–3	Hull City	Birkenhead
19:45 BST	Ray (yellow card) 74'	Report	Toral 1'; Milinković 6'; Tafazolli 45'	Stadium: Prenton Park; Attendance: 3,421; Referee: Seb Stockbridge

=== EFL Trophy ===
On 9 July 2019, the pre-determined group stage draw was announced with Invited clubs to be drawn on 12 July 2019. The draw for the second round was made on 16 November 2019 live on Sky Sports. The third round draw was confirmed on 5 December 2019.

Pos	Div	Team	Pld	W	PW	PL	L	GF	GA	GD	Pts	Qualification
1	L2	Salford City	2	2	0	0	0	4	0	+4	6	Advance to Round 2
2	L1	Tranmere Rovers	2	1	0	0	1	2	3	−1	3	Advance to Round 2
3	ACA	Aston Villa U21	2	0	0	0	2	1	4	−3	0	
4	L1	Bury (Note: This group originally included the expelled Bury.) (E)	0	0	0	0	0	0	0	0	0	Expelled

Source: EFL.com
(E) Eliminated
Notes:

8 October 2019 Group stages	Tranmere Rovers	2–1	Aston Villa U21s	Birkenhead
19:45 BST	Ray 14'; Jennings 78'	Report	Archer 2'	Stadium: Prenton Park; Referee: Ollie Yates

12 November 2019 Group stages	Tranmere Rovers	0–2	Salford City	Birkenhead
19:45 BST		Report	Threlkeld 2'; Hogan 56'	Stadium: Prenton Park; Referee: James Adcock

4 December 2019 Second round	Tranmere Rovers	3–2	Manchester United U21	Birkenhead
19:45 GMT	Hepburn-Murphy 2' (yellow card) 45+2'; Spellman (yellow card) 30'; Jennings 40' (yellow card) 88'; Blackett-Taylor 54'; Maddox (yellow card) 90+2'; Danns (yellow card) 90+12'; Nelson (yellow card) 90+18'	Report	Chong 9', 31' (yellow card) 90+18'; Galbraith (yellow card) 90+14'; Sotona (red card) 90+17'	Stadium: Prenton Park; Attendance: 632

7 January 2020 Third round	Tranmere Rovers	1–2	Leicester City U21	Birkenhead
19:45 GMT	Mullin (yellow card) 23'; Gilmour 31'	Report	Hirst 52'; Muskwe 74'	Stadium: Prenton Park; Referee: Martin Coy
