= 2019–20 FA Cup =

Football Association Challenge Cup

Tournament details
- Country: England; Wales
- Dates: 10 August 2019 – 1 August 2020
- Teams: 735 (all); 644 (qualifying competition); 123 (main competition)

Final positions
- Champions: Arsenal (14th title)
- Runners-up: Chelsea

Tournament statistics
- Matches played: 156
- Goals scored: 429 (2.75 per match)
- Top goal scorer(s): James Ball; Harry McKirdy (5 goals each)
- (Note: All statistics do not include qualifying play-offs)

The 2019–20 FA Cup (also known as the Football Association Challenge Cup) was the 139th edition of the oldest football tournament in the world. It was sponsored by Emirates and known as the Emirates FA Cup for sponsorship purposes.

On 13 March 2020, it was agreed that the FA Cup, as well as the rest of professional football in England, would be suspended due to the COVID-19 pandemic. On 29 May 2020, The FA announced plans to restart the competition, with the rescheduled quarter-finals provisionally set to be played on 27 and 28 June and the final on 1 August. All remaining matches including the final were played behind closed doors. In an effort to "promote good, positive mental health for everyone", according to Prince William, the president of The Football Association, the 2020 FA Cup final was known as the "Heads Up FA Cup Final", with "Heads Up" a campaign to promote mental health.

The defending champions, Premier League side Manchester City, were eliminated by Arsenal in the semi-finals on 18 July. Arsenal won the final 2–1 against Chelsea, their first win since 2017 and fourth in seven years, for their record-extending fourteenth FA Cup title.

== Teams ==
Round	Clubs remaining	Clubs involved	Winners from previous round	New entries this round	Leagues entering at this round
First round proper	123 initially 124	79 initially 80	32	47 initially 48 (Note: Bury initially received direct entry into the first round, before their expulsion from the EFL. They were subsequently expelled from the FA Cup on 29 August 2019. On 16 October 2019, the FA announced that one club - the last one remaining in the draw - would receive a bye to the second round.)	23 EFL League One teams 24 EFL League Two teams
Second round proper	84	40	40	none	none
Third round proper	64	64	20	44	20 Premier League teams 24 EFL Championship teams
Fourth round proper	32	32	32	none	none
Fifth round proper	16	16	16	none	none
Quarter-finals	8	8	8	none	none
Semi-finals	4	4	4	none	none
Final	2	2	2	none	none

== Round and draw dates ==
For the first time, the fifth round fixtures were played midweek rather than on a weekend, to accommodate the "winter break".

Phase	Round	Draw date	Draw venue	First match date	Ref.
Qualifying rounds	Extra preliminary round	12 July 2019	Wembley Stadium	10 August 2019	
Qualifying rounds	Preliminary round	12 July 2019	Wembley Stadium	24 August 2019	
Qualifying rounds	First round qualifying	27 August 2019	Wembley Stadium	7 September 2019	
Qualifying rounds	Second round qualifying	9 September 2019	Wembley Stadium	21 September 2019	
Qualifying rounds	Third round qualifying	23 September 2019	Wembley Stadium	5 October 2019	
Qualifying rounds	Fourth round qualifying	7 October 2019	Wembley Stadium	19 October 2019	
Main tournament	First round proper	21 October 2019	Wallace Binder Ground (Maldon & Tiptree)	8 November 2019	
Main tournament	Second round proper	11 November 2019	Oaklands Park (Chichester City)	29 November 2019	
Main tournament	Third round proper	2 December 2019	City of Manchester Stadium (Manchester City)	4 January 2020	
Main tournament	Fourth round proper	6 January 2020	Emirates Stadium (Arsenal)	24 January 2020	
Main tournament	Fifth round proper	27 January 2020	BBC Broadcasting House	2 March 2020	
Main tournament	Quarter-finals	4 March 2020	Hillsborough Stadium (Sheffield Wednesday)	27 June 2020 (originally 21 March 2020)	
Main tournament	Semi-finals	28 June 2020 (originally 22 March 2020)	St James' Park (Newcastle United)	18 July 2020 (originally 18 April 2020)	
Main tournament	Final	28 June 2020 (originally 22 March 2020)	St James' Park (Newcastle United)	1 August 2020 (originally 23 May 2020)	

== Qualifying rounds ==
All of the competing teams that were not members of the Premier League or English Football League competed in the qualifying rounds to secure one of 32 available places in the first round proper. The qualifying competition began with the extra preliminary round on 10 August 2019, with the fourth and final qualifying round played over the weekend of 19 October 2019.

The winners from the fourth qualifying round were Boston United, Gateshead, Solihull Moors, Hartlepool United, Nantwich Town, Stourbridge, Chorley, Altrincham, Darlington, York City, Notts County, Wrexham, Harrogate Town, AFC Fylde, Chippenham Town, Yeovil Town, Dulwich Hamlet, Ebbsfleet United, Bromley, Maidstone United, Eastleigh, Oxford City, Maidenhead United, Chichester City, Hayes & Yeading United, Maldon & Tiptree, Barnet, Torquay United, Dover Athletic, Billericay Town, Kingstonian and Carshalton Athletic.

Maldon & Tiptree was the only club in this season's tournament appearing in the competition proper for the first time. Of the other successful qualifiers, Darlington and Hayes & Yeading United had last featured in the first round in 2010–11 (with Darlington having folded and been reconstituted in 2012), Boston United had last done so in 2006-07, Chippenham Town had last done so in 2005-06, Kingstonian had last done so in 2000-01, Dulwich Hamlet in 1998-99, Carshalton Athletic in 1997-98 and Chichester City in 1960-61 (although this Chichester City club was the product of a 2000 merger between the original club of that name and Portfield).

== First round proper ==
The draw for the first round proper was held on 21 October 2019. The 32 winners from the qualifying competition joined the 47 clubs from League One and League Two in 39 ties played over the weekend of 9 November. Due to Bury's expulsion from the competition, Chichester City (the final team drawn) were given a bye to the second round proper. Chichester are one of two Level 8 teams that reached the first round along with Maldon & Tiptree, the lowest ranked teams left in the competition.

8 November 2019	Dulwich Hamlet (6)	1–4	Carlisle United (4)	East Dulwich, London
19:55 GMT	C. Smith 49'	Report	Olomola 8'; McKirdy 37', 86'; M. Jones 55'	Stadium: Champion Hill; Attendance: 3,336; Referee: James Oldham

9 November 2019	Sunderland (3)	1–1	Gillingham (3)	Sunderland
13:00 GMT	McGeady 15'	Report	Lee 46'	Stadium: Stadium of Light; Attendance: 7,892; Referee: Michael Salisbury

19 November 2019 Replay	Gillingham (3)	1–0 (a.e.t.)	Sunderland (3)	Gillingham
19:45 GMT	Hanlan 105'	Report		Stadium: Priestfield Stadium; Attendance: 3,561; Referee: Alan Young

9 November 2019	Ipswich Town (3)	1–1	Lincoln City (3)	Ipswich
15:00 GMT	Dozzell 79'	Report	Walker 37'	Stadium: Portman Road; Attendance: 11,598; Referee: Kevin Johnson

20 November 2019 Replay	Lincoln City (3)	0–1	Ipswich Town (3)	Lincoln
19:45 GMT		Report	Judge 90+4'	Stadium: Sincil Bank; Attendance: 6,781; Referee: Andy Haines

9 November 2019	Oxford City (6)	1–5	Solihull Moors (5)	Oxford
15:00 GMT	Wiltshire 80'	Report	McCallum 10'; Ball 32', 42', 46', 51'	Stadium: Marsh Lane; Attendance: 667; Referee: Thomas Parsons

9 November 2019	Crawley Town (4)	4–1	Scunthorpe United (4)	Crawley
15:00 GMT	Nadesan 35'; Grego-Cox 82', 90+6'; Nathaniel-George 90+4'	Report	Colclough 79'	Stadium: Broadfield Stadium; Attendance: 1,706; Referee: Lee Swabey

9 November 2019	Colchester United (4)	0–2	Coventry City (3)	Colchester
15:00 GMT		Report	Shipley 11'; McCallum 27'	Stadium: Colchester Community Stadium; Attendance: 2,919; Referee: Chris Sarginson

9 November 2019	Bolton Wanderers (3)	0–1	Plymouth Argyle (4)	Bolton
15:00 GMT		Report	McFadzean 11'	Stadium: University of Bolton Stadium; Attendance: 6,992; Referee: Robert Lewis

9 November 2019	Maidstone United (6)	1–0	Torquay United (5)	Maidstone
15:00 GMT	Wishart 19'	Report		Stadium: Gallagher Stadium; Attendance: 2,330; Referee: Joe Hull

9 November 2019	Cambridge United (4)	1–1	Exeter City (4)	Cambridge
15:00 GMT	Smith 90+3'	Report	Fisher 34'	Stadium: Abbey Stadium; Attendance: 2,302; Referee: Peter Wright

19 November 2019 Replay	Exeter City (4)	1–0	Cambridge United (4)	Exeter
19:45 GMT	Fisher 70'	Report		Stadium: St James Park; Attendance: 2,719; Referee: Sam Purkiss

9 November 2019	Stourbridge (7)	2–2	Eastleigh (5)	Amblecote
15:00 GMT	Lloyd 25'; Grocott 52'	Report	Barnett 35'; Rendell 86'	Stadium: War Memorial Athletic Ground; Attendance: 1,846; Referee: Sam Barrott

19 November 2019 Replay	Eastleigh (5)	3–0	Stourbridge (7)	Eastleigh
19:45 GMT	Rendell 50' (pen.); Smart 69'; Johnson 78'	Report		Stadium: Ten Acres; Attendance: 1,509; Referee: Peter Gibbons

9 November 2019	Salford City (4)	1–1	Burton Albion (3)	Salford
15:00 GMT	Towell 83'	Report	Fraser 78'	Stadium: Moor Lane; Attendance: 2,724; Referee: Alan Young

19 November 2019 Replay	Burton Albion (3)	4–1	Salford City (4)	Burton upon Trent
19:45 GMT	Akins 42'; Templeton 64'; Brayford 70'; Sarkic 81'	Report	Touray 52'	Stadium: Pirelli Stadium; Attendance: 1,479; Referee: Marc Edwards

9 November 2019	Forest Green Rovers (4)	4–0	Billericay Town (6)	Nailsworth
15:00 GMT	Stevens 38'; J. Mills 45'; Aitchison 45+2'; Shephard 65'	Report		Stadium: The New Lawn; Attendance: 1,419; Referee: Graham Salisbury

9 November 2019	Ebbsfleet United (5)	2–3	Notts County (5)	Northfleet
15:00 GMT	Payne 7'; Ugwu 89' (pen.)	Report	Wootton 34', 58'; Turner 90+3'	Stadium: Stonebridge Road; Attendance: 1,206; Referee: Carl Brook

9 November 2019	Walsall (4)	2–2	Darlington (6)	Walsall
15:00 GMT	Lavery 86'; Bates 89'	Report	Holness 17'; Wheatley 90+7'	Stadium: Bescot Stadium; Attendance: 2,882; Referee: Adrian Quelch

20 November 2019 Replay	Darlington (6)	0–1	Walsall (4)	Darlington
19:45 GMT		Report	Lavery 68'	Stadium: Blackwell Meadows; Attendance: 3,106; Referee: Scott Oldham

9 November 2019	Nantwich Town (7)	0–1	AFC Fylde (5)	Nantwich
15:00 GMT		Report	Croasdale 44'	Stadium: Weaver Stadium; Attendance: 1,544; Referee: Ben Speedie

9 November 2019	AFC Wimbledon (3)	1–1	Doncaster Rovers (3)	Norbiton, London
15:00 GMT	Pigott 43'	Report	Anderson 63'	Stadium: Kingsmeadow; Attendance: 2,777; Referee: Darren Drysdale

19 November 2019 Replay	Doncaster Rovers (3)	2–0	AFC Wimbledon (3)	Doncaster
19:45 GMT	Coppinger 52'; Bingham 70'	Report		Stadium: Keepmoat Stadium; Attendance: 3,413; Referee: Chris Sarginson

9 November 2019	Shrewsbury Town (3)	1–1	Bradford City (4)	Shrewsbury
15:00 GMT	Laurent 28'	Report	Oteh 19'	Stadium: New Meadow; Attendance: 3,764; Referee: Sam Purkiss

19 November 2019 Replay	Bradford City (4)	0–1	Shrewsbury Town (3)	Bradford
19:45 GMT		Report	Edwards 66'	Stadium: Valley Parade; Attendance: 3,888; Referee: Paul Marsden

9 November 2019	Grimsby Town (4)	1–1	Newport County (4)	Cleethorpes
15:00 GMT	Waterfall 43'	Report	Amond 80' (pen.)	Stadium: Blundell Park; Attendance: 2,086; Referee: Leigh Doughty

20 November 2019 Replay	Newport County (4)	2–0	Grimsby Town (4)	Newport
19:45 GMT	Amond 50'; Labadie 90+2'	Report		Stadium: Rodney Parade; Attendance: 2,053; Referee: Darren Handley

9 November 2019	Mansfield Town (4)	1–0	Chorley (5)	Mansfield
15:00 GMT	Maynard 81'	Report		Stadium: Field Mill; Attendance: 2,418; Referee: Savvas Yianni

9 November 2019	Tranmere Rovers (3)	2–2	Wycombe Wanderers (3)	Birkenhead
15:00 GMT	Morris 3', 67'	Report	Jacobson 26'; Samuel 55'	Stadium: Prenton Park; Attendance: 3,849; Referee: Martin Coy

20 November 2019 Replay	Wycombe Wanderers (3)	1–2 (a.e.t.)	Tranmere Rovers (3)	High Wycombe
19:45 GMT	Stewart 45'	Report	Ferrier 55'; Morris 115'	Stadium: Adams Park; Attendance: 2,928; Referee: Graham Salisbury

9 November 2019	Carshalton Athletic (7)	1–4	Boston United (6)	Carshalton
15:00 GMT	Pattison 72'	Report	Thanoj 33', 90+1'; Shiels 37'; Wright 90+3'	Stadium: War Memorial Sports Ground; Attendance: 1,859; Referee: Tom Reeves

9 November 2019	Cheltenham Town (4)	1–1	Swindon Town (4)	Cheltenham
15:00 GMT	Addai 90+3'	Report	Yates 90+1'	Stadium: Whaddon Road; Attendance: 3,456; Referee: Scott Oldham

19 November 2019 Replay	Swindon Town (4)	0–1	Cheltenham Town (4)	Swindon
19:45 GMT		Report	Addai 50'	Stadium: County Ground; Attendance: 3,000; Referee: Darren Drysdale

9 November 2019	Accrington Stanley (3)	0–2	Crewe Alexandra (4)	Accrington
15:00 GMT		Report	Kirk 45+2'; Porter 67' (pen.)	Stadium: Crown Ground; Attendance: 1,655; Referee: Neil Hair

9 November 2019	Maidenhead United (5)	1–3	Rotherham United (3)	Maidenhead
15:00 GMT	Cassidy 25'	Report	Ihiekwe 69'; Ladapo 75'; Crooks 78'	Stadium: York Road; Attendance: 1,924; Referee: Ollie Yates

9 November 2019	Blackpool (3)	4–1	Morecambe (4)	Blackpool
15:00 GMT	Delfouneso 9'; Gnanduillet 24'; Virtue 45'; Kaikai 84'	Report	Stockton 45+2'	Stadium: Bloomfield Road; Attendance: 5,371; Referee: Ross Joyce

9 November 2019	Milton Keynes Dons (3)	0–1	Port Vale (4)	Milton Keynes
15:00 GMT		Report	Worrall 20'	Stadium: Stadium MK; Attendance: 3,598; Referee: Craig Hicks

9 November 2019	Stevenage (4)	1–1	Peterborough United (3)	Stevenage
15:00 GMT	List 56'	Report	Maddison 79'	Stadium: Broadhall Way; Attendance: 2,981; Referee: Nick Kinseley

19 November 2019 Replay	Peterborough United (3)	2–0	Stevenage (4)	Peterborough
19:45 GMT	Eisa 11'; R. Jones 90+4'	Report		Stadium: London Road; Attendance: 3,593; Referee: Ollie Yates

10 November 2019	Dover Athletic (5)	1–0	Southend United (3)	River
12:00 GMT	Sotiriou 84'	Report		Stadium: Crabble Athletic Ground; Attendance: 1,754; Referee: David Rock

10 November 2019	Barnet (5)	0–2	Fleetwood Town (3)	Canons Park, London
12:45 GMT		Report	Evans 29'; Hunter 90'	Stadium: The Hive Stadium; Attendance: 1,100; Referee: John Busby

10 November 2019	Bristol Rovers (3)	1–1	Bromley (5)	Bristol
12:45 GMT	Leahy 78'	Report	Bush 83'	Stadium: Memorial Stadium; Attendance: 3,649; Referee: Daniel Middleton

19 November 2019 Replay	Bromley (5)	0–1	Bristol Rovers (3)	Bromley, London
19:45 GMT		Report	Clarke-Harris 3'	Stadium: Hayes Lane; Attendance: 4,558; Referee: Christopher Pollard

10 November 2019	Leyton Orient (4)	1–2	Maldon & Tiptree (8)	Leyton, London
12:45 GMT	Dayton 67'	Report	Parish 43'; Slew 65'	Stadium: Brisbane Road; Attendance: 3,425; Referee: Charles Breakspear

10 November 2019	Chippenham Town (6)	0–3	Northampton Town (4)	Chippenham
12:45 GMT		Report	Smith 22'; Oliver 26', 45+3'	Stadium: Hardenhuish Park; Attendance: 2,625; Referee: Christopher Pollard

10 November 2019	Macclesfield Town (4)	0–4	Kingstonian (7)	Macclesfield
12:45 GMT		Report	Hector 7'; Theophanous 11', 69'; Bennett 47'	Stadium: Moss Rose; Attendance: 996; Referee: Will Finnie

10 November 2019	York City (6)	0–1	Altrincham (6)	York
12:45 GMT		Report	Peers 82'	Stadium: Bootham Crescent; Attendance: 3,222; Referee: James Bell

10 November 2019	Wrexham (5)	0–0	Rochdale (3)	Wrexham
12:45 GMT		Report		Stadium: Racecourse Ground; Attendance: 3,274; Referee: Trevor Kettle

19 November 2019 Replay	Rochdale (3)	1–0	Wrexham (5)	Rochdale
19:45 GMT	McShane 8'	Report		Stadium: Spotland; Attendance: 1,628; Referee: Seb Stockbridge

10 November 2019	Gateshead (6)	1–2	Oldham Athletic (4)	Gateshead
12:45 GMT	Agnew 53'	Report	Morais 28'; Smith 77'	Stadium: International Stadium; Attendance: 2,199; Referee: Josh Smith

10 November 2019	Hayes & Yeading United (7)	0–2	Oxford United (3)	Hayes, London
14:15 GMT		Report	Long 29'; Hall 69'	Stadium: Beaconsfield Road; Attendance: 1,501; Referee: Darren Handley

11 November 2019	Harrogate Town (5)	1–2	Portsmouth (3)	Harrogate
20:40 GMT (Note: The match between Harrogate Town and Portsmouth was scheduled to kick off at 19:45 GMT but was delayed by 55 minutes due to multiple power failures.)	Beck 7'	Report	Haunstrup 17'; Curtis 41'	Stadium: Wetherby Road; Attendance: 3,048; Referee: Anthony Backhouse

12 November 2019 (Note: The match on 9 November 2019 between Yeovil Town and Hartlepool United was postponed due to a waterlogged pitch. The match was later rearranged for 12 November 2019.)	Yeovil Town (5)	1–4	Hartlepool United (5)	Yeovil
19:45 GMT	D'Ath 3'	Report	James 6'; Holohan 20'; Kabamba 59'; Touré 86' (pen.)	Stadium: Huish Park; Attendance: 2,361; Referee: Carl Brook

Chichester City (8)	Bye

== Second round proper ==
The draw for the second round proper was held on 11 November 2019. The 39 winners of the first round proper and bye recipients Chichester City played in 20 second round proper ties on the weekend of 30 November. This round included two teams from level 8, Chichester City and Maldon & Tiptree, who were the lowest-ranked teams still in the competition.

29 November 2019	Maldon & Tiptree (8)	0–1	Newport County (4)	Maldon
19:55 GMT		Report	Amond 90+1'	Stadium: Wallace Binder Ground; Attendance: 1,876; Referee: Seb Stockbridge

30 November 2019	Portsmouth (3)	2–1	Altrincham (6)	Portsmouth
15:00 GMT	Close 56'; Pitman 90+4'	Report	Hancock 83' (pen.)	Stadium: Fratton Park; Attendance: 8,539; Referee: Tom Nield

30 November 2019	Shrewsbury Town (3)	2–0	Mansfield Town (4)	Shrewsbury
15:00 GMT	Laurent 88'; Walker 90+5'	Report		Stadium: New Meadow; Attendance: 3,678; Referee: Andy Haines

30 November 2019	Kingstonian (7)	0–2	AFC Fylde (5)	Kingston upon Thames, London
15:00 GMT		Report	Williams 9', 45+1'	Stadium: King George's Field; Attendance: 1,460; Referee: Lee Swabey

30 November 2019	Walsall (4)	0–1	Oxford United (3)	Walsall
15:00 GMT		Report	Henry 84'	Stadium: Bescot Stadium; Attendance: 3,224; Referee: Leigh Doughty

30 November 2019	Forest Green Rovers (4)	2–2	Carlisle United (4)	Nailsworth
15:00 GMT	Collins 11'; G. Jones 78' (o.g.)	Report	Thomas 40', 76'	Stadium: The New Lawn; Attendance: 1,504; Referee: Trevor Kettle

10 December 2019 Replay	Carlisle United (4)	1–0	Forest Green Rovers (4)	Carlisle
19:45 GMT	Hayden 41'	Report		Stadium: Brunton Park; Attendance: 1,736; Referee: Andy Haines

30 November 2019	Oldham Athletic (4)	0–1	Burton Albion (3)	Oldham
15:00 GMT		Report	Boyce 23'	Stadium: Boundary Park; Attendance: 2,858; Referee: Andy Davies

30 November 2019	Cheltenham Town (4)	1–3	Port Vale (4)	Cheltenham
15:00 GMT	Reid 3' (pen.)	Report	Pope 60', 63', 68'	Stadium: Whaddon Road; Attendance: 2,725; Referee: Ross Joyce

30 November 2019	Eastleigh (5)	1–1	Crewe Alexandra (4)	Eastleigh
17:30 GMT	Barnes 86'	Report	Dale 36'	Stadium: Ten Acres; Attendance: 1,806; Referee: John Busby

10 December 2019 Replay	Crewe Alexandra (4)	3–1	Eastleigh (5)	Crewe
19:45 GMT	Anene 39', 63'; Johnson 55' (o.g.)	Report	Barnes 90'	Stadium: Gresty Road; Attendance: 2,184; Referee: Sam Purkiss

1 December 2019	Blackpool (3)	3–1	Maidstone United (6)	Blackpool
14:00 GMT	Elokobi 47' (o.g.); Delfouneso 50', 51'	Report	Khan 29'	Stadium: Bloomfield Road; Attendance: 3,977; Referee: James Adcock

1 December 2019	Coventry City (3)	1–1	Ipswich Town (3)	Birmingham
14:00 GMT	O'Hare 90+4'	Report	Keane 51'	Stadium: St Andrew's; Attendance: 2,878; Referee: Anthony Backhouse

10 December 2019 Replay	Ipswich Town (3)	1–2	Coventry City (3)	Ipswich
	Garbutt 84'	Report	Shipley 18'; Biamou 33'	Stadium: Portman Road; Attendance: 6,515; Referee: Chris Sarginson

1 December 2019	Exeter City (4)	2–2	Hartlepool United (5)	Exeter
14:00 GMT	Bowman 21'; Atangana 29'	Report	Featherstone 73'; Kabamba 79'	Stadium: St James Park; Attendance: 3,638; Referee: Josh Smith

10 December 2019 Replay	Hartlepool United (5)	1–0 (a.e.t.)	Exeter City (4)	Hartlepool
	Hawkes 93'	Report		Stadium: Victoria Park; Attendance: 2,398; Referee: Scott Oldham

1 December 2019	Gillingham (3)	3–0	Doncaster Rovers (3)	Gillingham
14:00 GMT	Byrne 11'; Lee 15'; Hanlan 68'	Report		Stadium: Priestfield Stadium; Attendance: 3,216; Referee: Darren Handley

1 December 2019	Rochdale (3)	0–0	Boston United (6)	Rochdale
14:00 GMT		Report		Stadium: Spotland Stadium; Attendance: 2,583; Referee: Dean Whitestone

16 December 2019 Replay	Boston United (6)	1–2	Rochdale (3)	Boston
19:30 GMT	Thewlis 49'	Report	Crook 4' (o.g.); Morley 79' (pen.)	Stadium: York Street; Attendance: 4,190; Referee: Ollie Yates

1 December 2019	Peterborough United (3)	3–0	Dover Athletic (5)	Peterborough
14:00 GMT	Toney 7'; Kent 79'; Eisa 84'	Report		Stadium: London Road; Attendance: 4,239; Referee: Brett Huxtable

1 December 2019	Crawley Town (4)	1–2	Fleetwood Town (3)	Crawley
14:00 GMT	Palmer 44'	Report	Morris 41'; Madden 66'	Stadium: Broadfield Stadium; Attendance: 2,000; Referee: Matt Donohue

1 December 2019	Northampton Town (4)	3–1	Notts County (5)	Northampton
14:00 GMT	Wharton 3'; Oliver 25'; Smith 76'	Report	Dennis 84'	Stadium: Sixfields Stadium; Attendance: 4,489; Referee: Paul Marsden

1 December 2019	Bristol Rovers (3)	1–1	Plymouth Argyle (4)	Bristol
14:00 GMT	Sercombe 74'	Report	Sarcevic 84' (pen.)	Stadium: Memorial Stadium; Attendance: 6,215; Referee: Will Finnie

17 December 2019 Replay	Plymouth Argyle (4)	0–1	Bristol Rovers (3)	Plymouth
19:30 GMT		Report	Rodman 68'	Stadium: Home Park; Attendance: 5,685; Referee: Andy Woolmer

1 December 2019	Tranmere Rovers (3)	5–1	Chichester City (8)	Birkenhead
15:00 GMT	Blackett-Taylor 62', 85'; Ferrier 64', 71', 75'	Report	Peake 90+1'	Stadium: Prenton Park; Attendance: 4,370; Referee: Darren Drysdale

2 December 2019	Solihull Moors (5)	3–4	Rotherham United (3)	Solihull
19:45 GMT	Osborne 6'; Gudger 8'; Ball 62'	Report	Ladapo 76'; Ihiekwe 79'; Smith 88', 90+1'	Stadium: Damson Park; Attendance: 2,317; Referee: Carl Boyeson

== Third round proper ==
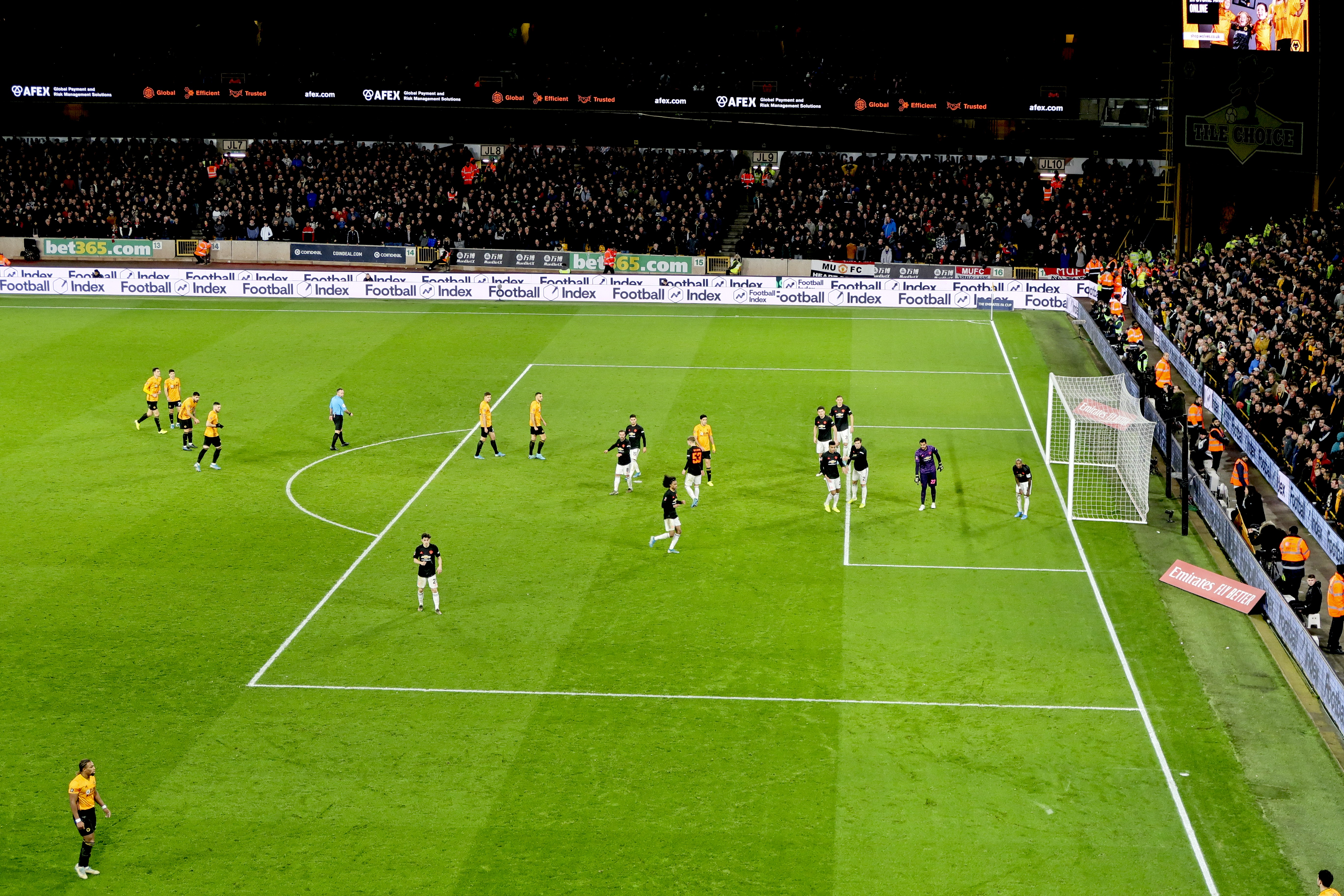
Wolverhampton Wanderers vs Manchester United at Molineux Stadium

The draw for the third round proper was held on 2 December 2019. The 20 second round winners joined the 20 Premier League and 24 EFL Championship clubs in 32 ties played across the weekend of 4–6 January 2020. This round included two teams from level 5, AFC Fylde and Hartlepool United, who were the lowest-ranked teams still in the competition.

All thirty-two matches kicked off one minute late to encourage fans to take one minute to think about their mental health, and to broadcast a film narrated by FA president Prince William about this issue.

4 January 2020	Rochdale (3)	1–1	Newcastle United (1)	Rochdale
12:31 GMT	Wilbraham 79'	Report	Almirón 17'	Stadium: Spotland Stadium; Attendance: 8,593; Referee: David Coote

14 January 2020 Replay	Newcastle United (1)	4–1	Rochdale (3)	Newcastle upon Tyne
19:45 GMT	O'Connell 17' (o.g.); M. Longstaff 20'; Almirón 26'; Joelinton 82'	Report	Williams 86'	Stadium: St James' Park; Attendance: 29,786; Referee: Graham Scott

4 January 2020	Bristol City (2)	1–1	Shrewsbury Town (3)	Bristol
12:31 GMT	Diédhiou 30'	Report	Goss 48'	Stadium: Aston Gate; Attendance: 9,730; Referee: John Busby

14 January 2020 Replay	Shrewsbury Town (3)	1–0	Bristol City (2)	Shrewsbury
19:45 GMT	Pierre 89'	Report		Stadium: New Meadow; Attendance: 7,194; Referee: David Webb

4 January 2020	Millwall (2)	3–0	Newport County (4)	Bermondsey, London
12:31 GMT	Smith 7'; Mahoney 64' (pen.); Bradshaw 82'	Report		Stadium: The Den; Attendance: 6,009; Referee: Tony Harrington

4 January 2020	Rotherham United (3)	2–3	Hull City (2)	Rotherham
12:31 GMT	Smith 20'; Vassell 43'	Report	Eaves 16', 66', 90+2'	Stadium: New York Stadium; Attendance: 6,044; Referee: Anthony Backhouse

4 January 2020	Burnley (1)	4–2	Peterborough United (3)	Burnley
12:31 GMT	Rodriguez 8', 52'; Pieters 15'; Hendrick 23'	Report	Toney 39'; R. Jones 76'	Stadium: Turf Moor; Attendance: 8,043; Referee: Robert Jones

4 January 2020	Birmingham City (2)	2–1	Blackburn Rovers (2)	Birmingham
12:31 GMT	Crowley 4'; Bela 90'	Report	Armstrong 61' (pen.)	Stadium: St Andrew's; Attendance: 7,330; Referee: Oliver Langford

4 January 2020	Fulham (2)	2–1	Aston Villa (1)	Fulham, London
15:01 GMT	Knockaert 53'; Arter 74'	Report	El Ghazi 64'	Stadium: Craven Cottage; Attendance: 12,980; Referee: Craig Pawson

4 January 2020	Cardiff City (2)	2–2	Carlisle United (4)	Cardiff
15:01 GMT	Paterson 50'; Whyte 55'	Report	Bridge 12'; McKirdy 45+2'	Stadium: Cardiff City Stadium; Attendance: 5,282; Referee: Geoff Eltringham

15 January 2020 Replay	Carlisle United (4)	3–4	Cardiff City (2)	Carlisle
19:45 GMT	Thomas 7'; McKirdy 51', 64'	Report	Flint 18', 48'; Murphy 45'; Ward 57'	Stadium: Brunton Park; Attendance: 4,381; Referee: Darren Handley

4 January 2020	Oxford United (3)	4–1	Hartlepool United (5)	Oxford
15:01 GMT	Hall 52'; Baptiste 66'; Fosu 84'; Taylor 87' (pen.)	Report	Kitching 9'	Stadium: Kassam Stadium; Attendance: 6,240; Referee: Michael Salisbury

4 January 2020	Southampton (1)	2–0	Huddersfield Town (2)	Southampton
15:01 GMT	Smallbone 47'; Vokins 87'	Report		Stadium: St Mary's Stadium; Attendance: 20,091; Referee: Tim Robinson

4 January 2020	Brighton & Hove Albion (1)	0–1	Sheffield Wednesday (2)	Brighton and Hove
15:01 GMT		Report	Reach 65'	Stadium: Falmer Stadium; Attendance: 20,349; Referee: Andre Marriner

4 January 2020	Reading (2)	2–2	Blackpool (3)	Reading
15:01 GMT	Baldock 56'; Loader 66'	Report	Delfouneso 28'; Gnanduillet 60'	Stadium: Madejski Stadium; Attendance: 10,181; Referee: John Brooks

14 January 2020 Replay	Blackpool (3)	0–2	Reading (2)	Blackpool
19:45 GMT		Report	Boyé 42'; Obita 82'	Stadium: Bloomfield Road; Attendance: 5,213; Referee: Darren Bond

4 January 2020	Watford (1)	3–3	Tranmere Rovers (3)	Watford
15:01 GMT	Dele-Bashiru 12'; Chalobah 14'; Pereyra 34'	Report	Jennings 65'; Monthé 78'; Mullin 87' (pen.)	Stadium: Vicarage Road; Attendance: 14,373; Referee: Graham Scott

23 January 2020 (Note: The match on 14 January 2020 between Tranmere Rovers and Watford was postponed due to a waterlogged pitch. The match was later rearranged for 23 January 2020.) Replay	Tranmere Rovers (3)	2–1 (a.e.t.)	Watford (1)	Birkenhead
19:45 GMT	Monthé 36'; Mullin 104'	Report	Hinds 68'	Stadium: Prenton Park; Attendance: 10,039; Referee: Tony Harrington

4 January 2020	Preston North End (2)	2–4	Norwich City (1)	Preston
15:01 GMT	Bodin 48'; Harrop 84'	Report	Idah 2', 38', 61' (pen.); Hernández 28'	Stadium: Deepdale; Attendance: 7,616; Referee: Martin Atkinson

4 January 2020	Brentford (2)	1–0	Stoke City (2)	Brentford, London
15:01 GMT	Marcondes 43'	Report		Stadium: Griffin Park; Attendance: 7,575; Referee: Keith Stroud

4 January 2020	Leicester City (1)	2–0	Wigan Athletic (2)	Leicester
17:31 GMT	Pearce 19' (o.g.); Barnes 40'	Report		Stadium: King Power Stadium; Attendance: 30,330; Referee: Simon Hooper

4 January 2020	Wolverhampton Wanderers (1)	0–0	Manchester United (1)	Wolverhampton
17:31 GMT		Report		Stadium: Molineux Stadium; Attendance: 31,381; Referee: Paul Tierney

15 January 2020 Replay	Manchester United (1)	1–0	Wolverhampton Wanderers (1)	Manchester
20:00 GMT	Mata 67'	Report		Stadium: Old Trafford; Attendance: 67,025; Referee: Kevin Friend

4 January 2020	Bournemouth (1)	4–0	Luton Town (2)	Bournemouth
17:31 GMT	Billing 8', 79'; C. Wilson 67'; Solanke 82'	Report		Stadium: Dean Court; Attendance: 10,064; Referee: Darren England

4 January 2020	Manchester City (1)	4–1	Port Vale (4)	Manchester
17:31 GMT	Zinchenko 20'; Agüero 42'; Harwood-Bellis 58'; Foden 76'	Report	Pope 35'	Stadium: City of Manchester Stadium; Attendance: 52,433; Referee: Lee Mason

4 January 2020	Fleetwood Town (3)	1–2	Portsmouth (3)	Fleetwood
17:31 GMT	McAleny 90+1'	Report	Bolton 66'; Marquis 71'	Stadium: Highbury Stadium; Attendance: 2,145; Referee: Marc Edwards

5 January 2020	Queens Park Rangers (2)	5–1	Swansea City (2)	Shepherd's Bush, London
14:01 GMT	Hugill 21', 45'; Osayi-Samuel 29'; Wallace 76'; Scowen 90+1'	Report	Byers 60'	Stadium: Loftus Road; Attendance: 6,712; Referee: Stephen Martin

5 January 2020	Chelsea (1)	2–0	Nottingham Forest (2)	Fulham, London
14:01 GMT	Hudson-Odoi 6'; Barkley 33'	Report		Stadium: Stamford Bridge; Attendance: 40,492; Referee: Peter Bankes

5 January 2020	Charlton Athletic (2)	0–1	West Bromwich Albion (2)	Charlton, London
14:01 GMT		Report	Zohore 32'	Stadium: The Valley; Attendance: 6,426; Referee: David Webb

5 January 2020	Sheffield United (1)	2–1	AFC Fylde (5)	Sheffield
14:01 GMT	Robinson 8'; Clarke 60'	Report	Williams 78'	Stadium: Bramall Lane; Attendance: 11,133; Referee: Jarred Gillett

5 January 2020	Bristol Rovers (3)	2–2	Coventry City (3)	Bristol
14:01 GMT	Clarke-Harris 6' (pen.); Craig 32'	Report	Walsh 31'; Craig 53' (o.g.)	Stadium: Memorial Stadium; Attendance: 7,000; Referee: Gavin Ward

14 January 2020 Replay	Coventry City (3)	3–0	Bristol Rovers (3)	Birmingham
19:45 GMT	Biamou 4', 56'; Pask 50'	Report		Stadium: St Andrew's; Attendance: 2,693; Referee: Anthony Backhouse

5 January 2020	Crewe Alexandra (4)	1–3	Barnsley (2)	Crewe
14:01 GMT	Green 48'	Report	Brown 3'; Chaplin 75'; Thomas 90+4'	Stadium: Gresty Road; Attendance: 5,158; Referee: James Linington

5 January 2020	Middlesbrough (2)	1–1	Tottenham Hotspur (1)	Middlesbrough
14:01 GMT	Fletcher 50'	Report	Lucas 61'	Stadium: Riverside Stadium; Attendance: 26,693; Referee: Stuart Attwell

14 January 2020 Replay	Tottenham Hotspur (1)	2–1	Middlesbrough (2)	Tottenham, London
20:05 GMT	Lo Celso 2'; Lamela 15'	Report	Saville 83'	Stadium: Tottenham Hotspur Stadium; Attendance: 49,202; Referee: Craig Pawson

5 January 2020	Crystal Palace (1)	0–1	Derby County (2)	Selhurst
14:01 GMT		Report	Martin 32'	Stadium: Selhurst Park; Attendance: 15,507; Referee: Michael Oliver

5 January 2020	Burton Albion (3)	2–4	Northampton Town (4)	Burton upon Trent
14:01 GMT	Edwards 45+2'; Fraser 90+1'	Report	Adams 10'; Watson 23'; Goode 45+1'; Hoskins 70'	Stadium: Pirelli Stadium; Attendance: 3,810; Referee: Jeremy Simpson

5 January 2020	Liverpool (1)	1–0	Everton (1)	Liverpool
16:01 GMT	Jones 71'	Report		Stadium: Anfield; Attendance: 52,583; Referee: Jon Moss

5 January 2020	Gillingham (3)	0–2	West Ham United (1)	Gillingham
18:16 GMT		Report	Zabaleta 74'; Fornals 90+4'	Stadium: Priestfield Stadium; Attendance: 10,913; Referee: Andrew Madley

6 January 2020	Arsenal (1)	1–0	Leeds United (2)	Holloway, London
19:56 GMT	Nelson 55'	Report		Stadium: Emirates Stadium; Attendance: 58,403; Referee: Anthony Taylor

== Fourth round proper ==
The draw was held on 6 January 2020, ahead of the Arsenal v Leeds United match. The ties were played between 24 and 27 January 2020. Northampton Town of League Two (level 4) were the lowest-ranked team to compete in this round.

24 January 2020	Northampton Town (4)	0–0	Derby County (2)	Northampton
20:00 GMT		Report		Stadium: Sixfields Stadium; Attendance: 7,798; Referee: Darren England

4 February 2020 Replay	Derby County (2)	4–2	Northampton Town (4)	Derby
19:45 GMT	Wisdom 28'; Holmes 35'; Marriott 51'; Rooney 77' (pen.)	Report	Adams 47'; Hoskins 84' (pen.)	Stadium: Pride Park Stadium; Attendance: 15,860; Referee: David Webb

24 January 2020	Queens Park Rangers (2)	1–2	Sheffield Wednesday (2)	Shepherd's Bush, London
20:00 GMT	Wells 90+3'	Report	Fox 43'; Winnall 90+1'	Stadium: Loftus Road; Attendance: 11,871; Referee: Keith Stroud

25 January 2020	Brentford (2)	0–1	Leicester City (1)	Brentford, London
12:45 GMT		Report	Iheanacho 4'	Stadium: Griffin Park; Attendance: 12,221; Referee: Chris Kavanagh

25 January 2020	Southampton (1)	1–1	Tottenham Hotspur (1)	Southampton
15:00 GMT	Boufal 87'	Report	Son Heung-min 58'	Stadium: St Mary's Stadium; Attendance: 29,282; Referee: Peter Bankes

5 February 2020 Replay	Tottenham Hotspur (1)	3–2	Southampton (1)	Tottenham, London
19:45 GMT	Stephens 12' (o.g.); Lucas 78'; Son Heung-min 87' (pen.)	Report	Long 34'; Ings 72'	Stadium: Tottenham Hotspur Stadium; Attendance: 56,046; Referee: David Coote

25 January 2020	Millwall (2)	0–2	Sheffield United (1)	Bermondsey, London
15:00 GMT		Report	Bešić 62'; Norwood 84'	Stadium: The Den; Attendance: 12,653; Referee: Anthony Taylor

25 January 2020	Reading (2)	1–1	Cardiff City (2)	Reading
15:00 GMT	Méïté 8'	Report	Paterson 5'	Stadium: Madejski Stadium; Attendance: 12,798; Referee: Marc Edwards

4 February 2020 Replay	Cardiff City (2)	3–3 (a.e.t.) (1–4 p)	Reading (2)	Cardiff
19:45 GMT	Murphy 19', 93'; Glatzel 54'	Report	Richards 69'; Rinomhota 79'; Méïté 116'	Stadium: Cardiff City Stadium; Attendance: 4,832; Referee: Gavin Ward
	Penalties
	Flint (penalty missed); Vaulks (penalty missed); Pack (penalty scored)		(penalty scored) McCleary; (penalty scored) Osho; (penalty scored) Obita; (penalty scored) Aluko

25 January 2020	West Ham United (1)	0–1	West Bromwich Albion (2)	Stratford, London
15:00 GMT		Report	Townsend 9'	Stadium: London Stadium; Attendance: 58,911; Referee: Stuart Attwell

25 January 2020	Burnley (1)	1–2	Norwich City (1)	Burnley
15:00 GMT	Pieters 72'	Report	Hanley 53'; Drmić 57'	Stadium: Turf Moor; Attendance: 8,071; Referee: Michael Oliver

25 January 2020	Coventry City (3)	0–0	Birmingham City (2)	Birmingham
15:00 GMT		Report		Stadium: St Andrew's; Attendance: 21,193; Referee: Tim Robinson

4 February 2020 Replay	Birmingham City (2)	2–2 (a.e.t.) (4–1 p)	Coventry City (3)	Birmingham
19:45 GMT	Dean 90+2'; Bela 120'	Report	Roberts 50' (o.g.); Biamou 114'	Stadium: St Andrew's; Attendance: 11,680; Referee: Darren Bond
	Penalties
	Jutkiewicz (penalty scored); Bela (penalty scored); G. Gardner (penalty scored); Dean (penalty scored)		(penalty scored) Godden; (penalty missed) Walsh; (penalty missed) Allen

25 January 2020	Newcastle United (1)	0–0	Oxford United (3)	Newcastle upon Tyne
15:00 GMT		Report		Stadium: St James' Park; Attendance: 52,221; Referee: Robert Jones

4 February 2020 Replay	Oxford United (3)	2–3 (a.e.t.)	Newcastle United (1)	Oxford
19:45 GMT	Kelly 84'; Holland 90+4'	Report	S. Longstaff 15'; Joelinton 30'; Saint-Maximin 116'	Stadium: Kassam Stadium; Attendance: 11,520; Referee: Peter Bankes

25 January 2020	Portsmouth (3)	4–2	Barnsley (2)	Portsmouth
15:00 GMT	Close 37'; Marquis 45+1'; Curtis 62'; Burgess 76'	Report	Woodrow 60'; Chaplin 90+1'	Stadium: Fratton Park; Attendance: 13,286; Referee: Graham Scott

25 January 2020	Hull City (2)	1–2	Chelsea (1)	Kingston upon Hull
17:30 GMT	Grosicki 78'	Report	Batshuayi 6'; Tomori 64'	Stadium: KCOM Stadium; Attendance: 24,109; Referee: Craig Pawson

26 January 2020	Manchester City (1)	4–0	Fulham (2)	Manchester
13:00 GMT	Gündoğan 8' (pen.); B. Silva 19'; Gabriel Jesus 72', 75'	Report		Stadium: City of Manchester Stadium; Attendance: 39,223; Referee: Kevin Friend

26 January 2020	Tranmere Rovers (3)	0–6	Manchester United (1)	Birkenhead
15:00 GMT		Report	Maguire 10'; Dalot 13'; Lingard 16'; Jones 41'; Martial 45'; Greenwood 56' (pen.)	Stadium: Prenton Park; Attendance: 13,779; Referee: Lee Mason

26 January 2020	Shrewsbury Town (3)	2–2	Liverpool (1)	Shrewsbury
17:00 GMT	Cummings 65' (pen.), 75'	Report	Jones 15'; Love 46' (o.g.)	Stadium: New Meadow; Attendance: 9,510; Referee: Simon Hooper

4 February 2020 Replay	Liverpool (1)	1–0	Shrewsbury Town (3)	Liverpool
20:00 GMT (Note: The replay between Liverpool and Shrewsbury Town was scheduled to kick off at 19:45 GMT but was delayed by 15 minutes due to a road accident that closed the M62 and significantly disrupted the arrival of supporters.)	Williams 75' (o.g.)	Report		Stadium: Anfield; Attendance: 52,399; Referee: Andrew Madley

27 January 2020	Bournemouth (1)	1–2	Arsenal (1)	Bournemouth
20:00 GMT	Surridge 90+4'	Report	Saka 5'; Nketiah 26'	Stadium: Dean Court; Attendance: 10,308; Referee: Martin Atkinson

== Fifth round proper ==
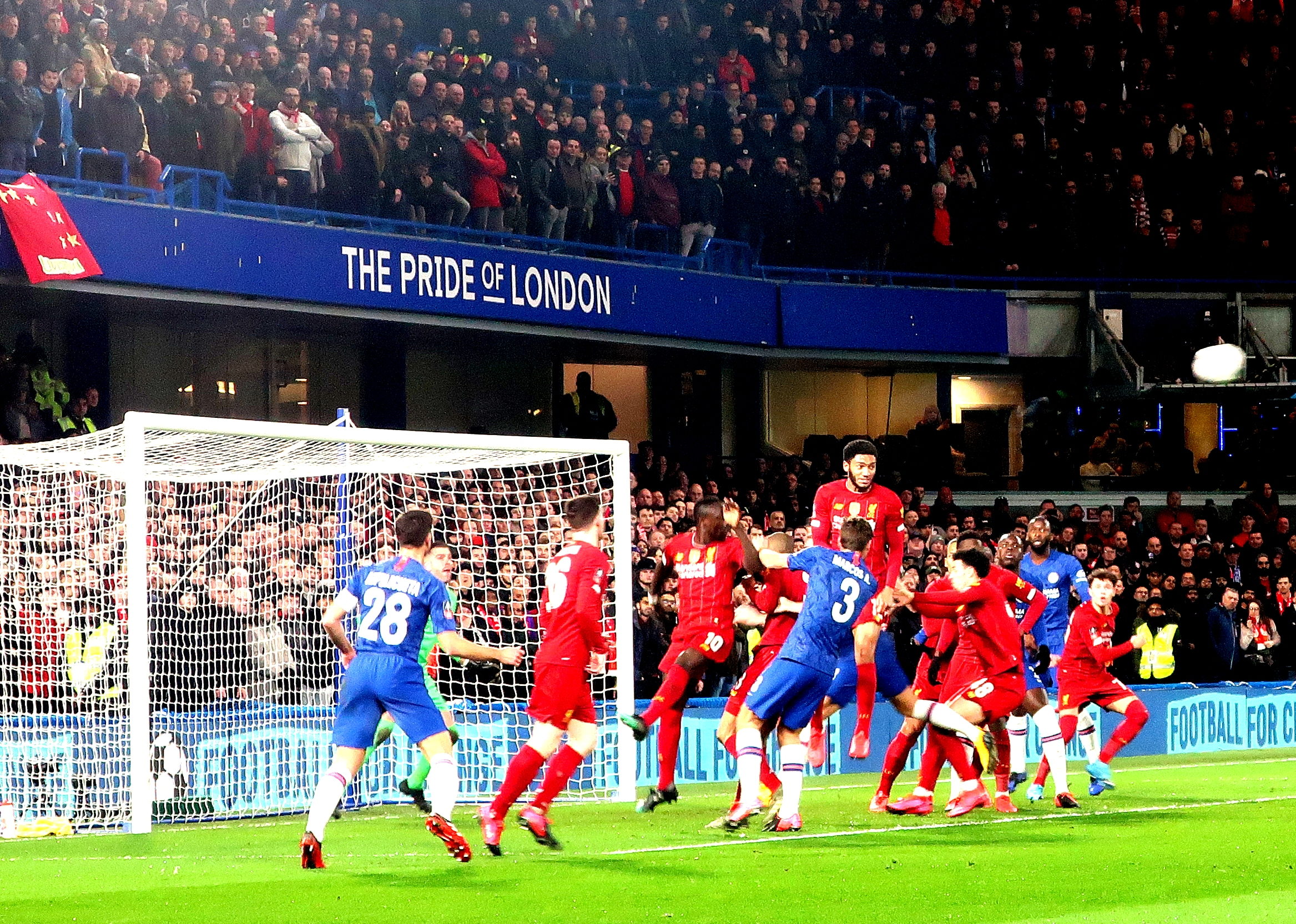
During the Chelsea vs Liverpool game at Stamford Bridge

The draw was held on 27 January 2020, ahead of the Bournemouth v Arsenal fourth-round match. The ties were played in midweek during the week commencing Monday 2 March 2020 and from this round onward, there were no replays; all ties would head to extra time and, if necessary, penalties to decide the team to advance in the event of a draw.

The lowest-ranked side to play in the fifth round was Portsmouth of League One (level 3).

2 March 2020	Portsmouth (3)	0–2	Arsenal (1)	Portsmouth
19:45 GMT		Report	Sokratis 45+4'; Nketiah 51'	Stadium: Fratton Park; Attendance: 18,839; Referee: Mike Dean

3 March 2020	Chelsea (1)	2–0	Liverpool (1)	Fulham, London
19:45 GMT	Willian 13'; Barkley 64'	Report		Stadium: Stamford Bridge; Attendance: 40,103; Referee: Chris Kavanagh

3 March 2020	Reading (2)	1–2 (a.e.t.)	Sheffield United (1)	Reading
20:00 GMT	Pușcaș 43' (pen.)	Report	McGoldrick 2'; Sharp 105+1'	Stadium: Madejski Stadium; Attendance: 15,129; Referee: Kevin Friend

3 March 2020	West Bromwich Albion (2)	2–3	Newcastle United (1)	West Bromwich
20:00 GMT	Phillips 74'; Zohore 90+3'	Report	Almirón 33', 45+1'; Lazaro 47'	Stadium: The Hawthorns; Attendance: 21,557; Referee: Anthony Taylor

4 March 2020	Sheffield Wednesday (2)	0–1	Manchester City (1)	Sheffield
19:45 GMT		Report	Agüero 53'	Stadium: Hillsborough Stadium; Attendance: 20,995; Referee: Michael Oliver

4 March 2020	Leicester City (1)	1–0	Birmingham City (2)	Leicester
19:45 GMT	Pereira 82'	Report		Stadium: King Power Stadium; Attendance: 27,181; Referee: Jon Moss

4 March 2020	Tottenham Hotspur (1)	1–1 (a.e.t.) (2–3 p)	Norwich City (1)	Tottenham, London
19:45 GMT	Vertonghen 13'	Report	Drmić 78'	Stadium: Tottenham Hotspur Stadium; Attendance: 58,007; Referee: Paul Tierney
	Penalties
	Dier (penalty scored); Lamela (penalty missed); Lo Celso (penalty scored); Parrott (penalty missed); Fernandes (penalty missed)		(penalty missed) McLean; (penalty scored) Idah; (penalty scored) Stiepermann; (penalty scored) Cantwell

5 March 2020	Derby County (2)	0–3	Manchester United (1)	Derby
19:45 GMT		Report	Shaw 33'; Ighalo 41', 70'	Stadium: Pride Park Stadium; Attendance: 31,379; Referee: Craig Pawson

== Quarter-finals ==
The draw for the quarter-finals took place on 4 March 2020. All teams playing in this round were from the Premier League, the first all-Premier League quarter-finals since 2005–06.

The ties were due to be played on 21 and 22 March 2020, before being postponed on 13 March 2020 due to the COVID-19 pandemic. The fixtures were revised to the 27 and 28 June 2020 following the end of the suspension. All ties were played behind closed doors.

As a gesture of solidarity following the murder of George Floyd, the 'Black Lives Matter' badge is used by all players from this round on. The FA also gave their support for any player who chooses to "take a knee" before or during matches. In addition, the NHS tribute badge was also used at all kits for the remainder of the season. All teams but Sheffield United and Newcastle United donned both badges at the front side, the others put the BLM badge below the players' number at the back of the shirt.

27 June 2020 (Note: The match on 22 March 2020 between Norwich City and Manchester United was postponed due to the COVID-19 pandemic in the United Kingdom. The match was later rearranged for 27 June 2020.)	Norwich City (1)	1–2 (a.e.t.)	Manchester United (1)	Norwich
17:30 BST	Cantwell 75'	Report	Ighalo 51'; Maguire 118'	Stadium: Carrow Road; Attendance: 0 (Note: The quarter-finals, semi-finals and final were played behind closed doors due to the COVID-19 pandemic in the United Kingdom.); Referee: Jon Moss

28 June 2020 (Note: The match on 22 March 2020 between Sheffield United and Arsenal was postponed due to the COVID-19 pandemic in the United Kingdom. The match was later rearranged for 28 June 2020.)	Sheffield United (1)	1–2	Arsenal (1)	Sheffield
13:00 BST	McGoldrick 87'	Report	Pépé 25' (pen.); Ceballos 90+1'	Stadium: Bramall Lane; Attendance: 0 Referee: Paul Tierney

28 June 2020 (Note: The match on 21 March 2020 between Leicester City and Chelsea was postponed due to the COVID-19 pandemic in the United Kingdom. The match was later rearranged for 28 June 2020.)	Leicester City (1)	0–1	Chelsea (1)	Leicester
16:00 BST		Report	Barkley 63'	Stadium: King Power Stadium; Attendance: 0 Referee: Mike Dean

28 June 2020 (Note: The match on 21 March 2020 between Newcastle United and Manchester City was postponed due to the COVID-19 pandemic in the United Kingdom. The match was later rearranged for 28 June 2020.)	Newcastle United (1)	0–2	Manchester City (1)	Newcastle upon Tyne
18:30 BST		Report	De Bruyne 37' (pen.); Sterling 68'	Stadium: St James' Park; Attendance: 0 Referee: Lee Mason

== Semi-finals ==
The semi-finals were played on 18 and 19 July 2020 and were shown on BT Sport and BBC Sport. Both games were played at Wembley Stadium. The draw was held during half-time of the Newcastle United–Manchester City quarter-final match and was conducted by Alan Shearer.

18 July 2020	Arsenal (1)	2–0	Manchester City (1)	Wembley, London
19:45 BST	Aubameyang 19', 71'	Report		Stadium: Wembley Stadium; Attendance: 0 Referee: Jon Moss

19 July 2020	Manchester United (1)	1–3	Chelsea (1)	Wembley, London
18:00 BST	Fernandes 85' (pen.)	Report	Giroud 45+11'; Mount 46'; Maguire 74' (o.g.)	Stadium: Wembley Stadium; Attendance: 0 Referee: Mike Dean

== Final ==
The 2020 FA Cup final was played on 1 August 2020 and was shown live on BT Sport and BBC Sport. Wembley Stadium hosted the game as usual.

1 August 2020
17:30 BST

Arsenal	2–1	Chelsea
Aubameyang 28' (pen.), 67'	Report	Pulisic 5'

Wembley Stadium, London
Attendance: 0 (Note: The final was played behind closed doors due to the COVID-19 pandemic in the United Kingdom.)
Referee: Anthony Taylor (Cheshire)

== Top scorers ==
Rank	Player	Club	Goals
1	(England) James Ball	Solihull Moors	5
1	(England) Harry McKirdy	Carlisle United	5
3	(Paraguay) Miguel Almirón	Newcastle United	4
3	(Gabon) Pierre-Emerick Aubameyang	Arsenal	4
3	(France) Maxime Biamou	Coventry City	4
3	(England) Nathan Delfouneso	Blackpool	4
3	(Guyana) Morgan Ferrier	Tranmere Rovers	4
3	(England) Tom Pope	Port Vale	4
9	(Republic of Ireland) Pádraig Amond	Newport County	3
9	(England) Ross Barkley	Chelsea	3
9	(England) Tom Eaves	Hull City	3
9	(Republic of Ireland) Adam Idah	Norwich City	3
9	(Nigeria) Odion Ighalo	Manchester United	3
9	(England) Kieron Morris	Tranmere Rovers	3
9	(England) Josh Murphy	Cardiff City	3
9	(England) Vadaine Oliver	Northampton Town	3
9	(England) Michael Smith	Rotherham United	3
9	(England) Nathan Thomas	Carlisle United	3
9	(England) Jordan Williams	AFC Fylde	3

== Broadcasting rights ==
The domestic broadcasting rights for the competition were held by the BBC and subscription channel BT Sport. The BBC held the rights since 2014–15, while BT Sport since 2013–14. The FA Cup Final was required to be broadcast live on UK terrestrial television under the Ofcom code of protected sporting events.

The following matches were broadcast live on UK television:

Round	Date	Teams	Kick-off	Channels	
Round	Date	Teams	Kick-off	Digital	TV
First round	8 November	Dulwich Hamlet v Carlisle United	7:55pm	BBC iPlayer	BBC Two
First round	10 November	Dover Athletic v Southend United	12:00pm	BT Sport App	BT Sport 1
First round	10 November	Hayes & Yeading United v Oxford United	2:15pm	BT Sport App	BT Sport 1
First round	11 November	Harrogate Town v Portsmouth	7:45pm	BT Sport App	BT Sport 1
First round (Replay)	19 November	Bromley v Bristol Rovers	7:45pm	BT Sport App	BT Sport 1
First round (Replay)	20 November	Darlington v Walsall	7:45pm	BT Sport App	BT Sport 1
First round (Replay)	20 November	Newport County v Grimsby Town	7:55pm	BBC iPlayer	BBC Two
Second round	29 November	Maldon & Tiptree v Newport County	7:55pm	BBC iPlayer	BBC Two
Second round	30 November	Eastleigh v Crewe Alexandra	5:30pm	BT Sport App	BT Sport 1
Second round	1 December	Tranmere Rovers v Chichester City	3:00pm	BT Sport App	BT Sport 1
Second round	2 December	Solihull Moors v Rotherham United	7:45pm	BT Sport App	BT Sport 1
Second round (Replay)	16 December	Boston United v Rochdale	7:30pm	BT Sport App	BT Sport 1
Second round (Replay)	17 December	Plymouth Argyle v Bristol Rovers	7:30pm	BT Sport App	BT Sport 1
Third round	4 January	Rochdale v Newcastle United	12:31pm	BT Sport App	BT Sport 1
Third round	4 January	Wolverhampton Wanderers v Manchester United	5:31pm	BT Sport App	BT Sport 1
Third round	5 January	Middlesbrough v Tottenham Hotspur	2:01pm	BT Sport App	BT Sport 1
Third round	5 January	Liverpool v Everton	4:01pm	BBC iPlayer	BBC One
Third round	5 January	Gillingham v West Ham United	6:16pm	BT Sport App	BT Sport 1
Third round	6 January	Arsenal v Leeds United	7:56pm	BBC iPlayer	BBC One
Third round (Replay)	14 January	Tottenham Hotspur v Middlesbrough	8:05pm	BBC iPlayer	BBC One
Third round (Replay)	15 January	Manchester United v Wolverhampton Wanderers	7:45pm	BT Sport App	BT Sport 1
Fourth round	24 January	Northampton Town v Derby County	8:00pm	BT Sport App	BT Sport 1
Fourth round	24 January	Queens Park Rangers v Sheffield Wednesday	8:00pm	BT Sport App	BT Sport Extra
Fourth round	25 January	Brentford v Leicester City	12:45pm	BBC iPlayer	BBC One
Fourth round	25 January	Hull City v Chelsea	5:30pm	BT Sport App	BT Sport 1
Fourth round	26 January	Manchester City v Fulham	1:00pm	BBC iPlayer	BBC One
Fourth round	26 January	Tranmere Rovers v Manchester United	3:00pm	BT Sport App	BT Sport 1
Fourth round	26 January	Shrewsbury Town v Liverpool	5:00pm	BBC iPlayer	BBC One
Fourth round	27 January	Bournemouth v Arsenal	8:00pm	BT Sport App	BT Sport 1
Fourth round (Replay)	4 February	Oxford United v Newcastle United	8:05pm	BBC iPlayer	BBC One
Fourth round (Replay)	5 February	Southampton v Tottenham Hotspur	7:45pm	BT Sport App	BT Sport 1
Fifth round	2 March	Reading v Sheffield United	7:45pm	BT Sport App	BT Sport 1
Fifth round	3 March	Chelsea v Liverpool	7:30pm	BBC iPlayer	BBC One
Fifth round	3 March	West Bromwich Albion v Newcastle United	8:00pm	BBC iPlayer	BBC Red Button
Fifth round	3 March	Reading v Sheffield United	8:00pm	Facebook	—N/a
Fifth round	4 March	Sheffield Wednesday v Manchester City	7:30pm	BBC iPlayer	BBC One
Fifth round	4 March	Tottenham Hotspur v Norwich City	7:45pm	BBC iPlayer	BBC Red Button
Fifth round	4 March	Leicester City v Birmingham City	7:45pm	Facebook	—N/a
Fifth round	5 March	Derby County v Manchester United	7:45pm	BT Sport App	BT Sport 1
Quarter-finals	27 June	Norwich City v Manchester United	5:30pm	BBC iPlayer	BBC One
Quarter-finals	28 June	Sheffield United v Arsenal	1:00pm	BT Sport App	BT Sport 1
Quarter-finals	28 June	Leicester City v Chelsea	4:00pm	BT Sport App	BT Sport 1
Quarter-finals	28 June	Newcastle United v Manchester City	6:30pm	BBC iPlayer	BBC One
Semi-finals	18 July	Arsenal v Manchester City	7:45pm	BT Sport App	BT Sport 1
Semi-finals	19 July	Manchester United v Chelsea	6:00pm	BBC iPlayer	BBC One
Final	1 August	Arsenal v Chelsea	5:30pm	BBC iPlayer	BBC One
Final	1 August	Arsenal v Chelsea	5:30pm	BT Sport App	BT Sport 1
