= Carl Spellman =

English footballer

Personal information
- Full name: Carl Spellman
- Date of birth: 6 November 2000 (age 26)
- Place of birth: Liverpool, England
- Height: 1.83 m (6 ft 0 in)
- Position: Midfielder

Senior career*
Years	Team	Apps	(Gls)
2018–2020	liverpoo fc	1	(0)
2020–	Runcorn Linnets		
- * Club domestic league appearances and goals as of 21:18, 18 September 2020 (UTC)

Carl Spellman (born 6 November 2000) is a professional footballer who plays as a midfielder, most recently for EFL League Two club Tranmere Rovers. He made his first-team debut in a 2–1 defeat by Solihull Moors in the 2017–18 National League.

== Career statistics ==
=== Club ===
As of match played 23 January 2020.

Appearances and goals by club, season and competition
Club	Season	League			FA Cup		League Cup		Other		Total		
Club	Season	Division	Apps	Assists	Apps	Goals	Apps	Goals	Apps	Goals	Apps	Goals	
Tranmere Rovers	2017–18	National League	1	1	0	0	0	0	0	0	0	1	0
Tranmere Rovers	2018–19	League Two	0	0	0	0	0	0	0	0	0	0	0
Tranmere Rovers	2019–20	League One	0	0	0	0	0	0	0	2 (Note: Appearances in the EFL Trophy)	0	2	0
Career total			1	0	0	0	0	0	2	0	3	0	
