= Manny Monthé =

Cameroonian footballer (born 1995)

Manny Monthe
Personal information
- Full name: Emmanuel Gaëtan Nguemkam Monthé
- Date of birth: 26 January 1995 (age 31)
- Place of birth: Douala, Cameroon
- Height: 1.92 m (6 ft 4 in)
- Position: Centre-back

Team information
- Current team: Oldham Athletic
- Number: 6

Youth career
- 2010–2014: Queens Park Rangers

Senior career*
| Years | Team | Apps | (Gls) |
| 2013–2014 | Queens Park Rangers | 0 | (0) |
| 2014 | → Southport (loan) | 7 | (0) |
| 2014 | Whitehawk | 1 | (0) |
| 2014 | Tonbridge Angels | 9 | (0) |
| 2014–2015 | Heybridge Swifts | 3 | (1) |
| 2015 | Hayes & Yeading United | 11 | (0) |
| 2015–2016 | Havant & Waterlooville | 14 | (0) |
| 2015–2016 | → Hayes & Yeading United (loan) | 17 | (1) |
| 2016 | Bath City | 19 | (4) |
| 2016–2018 | Forest Green Rovers | 26 | (1) |
| 2018 | → Tranmere Rovers (loan) | 4 | (0) |
| 2018–2021 | Tranmere Rovers | 108 | (3) |
| 2021–2023 | Walsall | 81 | (2) |
| 2023–2024 | Northampton Town | 34 | (1) |
| 2024– | Oldham Athletic | 68 | (6) |
- * Club domestic league appearances and goals as of 25 March 2026

Emmanuel Gaëtan Nguemkam Monthé (born 26 January 1995) is a Cameroonian footballer who plays as a defender for EFL League Two club Oldham Athletic.

== Career ==
Monthé was a youth player at Queens Park Rangers before signing a professional contract for the 2013–14 season. He was loaned to Southport in March 2014. He made seven appearances before returning to the Rs where he was released at the end of the season.

He joined Bath City for 2016–17 season, After an impressive 5 months in his performances scoring 4 goals in 19 appearances Monthé was signed by Forest Green Rovers in November 2016 agreeing a two-and-a-half-year contract for an undisclosed fee. Monthé was part of the Forest Green side that were victorious in the National League play-offs at the end of the season which saw the club promoted to the EFL for the first time in its history. He made his English Football League debut against Barnet on 5 August 2017. In February 2018 he joined Tranmere Rovers on loan which Monthé gained a second promotion in the National League (English football) The loan was made permanent at the end of the season for an undisclosed fee.

=== Tranmere Rovers ===
On 26 June 2018, Monthé signed to Tranmere Rovers F.C. after an impressive loan spell on for an undisclosed fee agreeing a one-year contract. The left footed centre-back made 43 league starts appearances scoring 2 goals during 2018–19 EFL League Two in total over 50 starts in all competition season securing a third promotion to League One in 2019 EFL League Two play-off final.

On 11 June 2019 after a momentous season, Manny Monthé signed a new two-year contract with Tranmere Rovers F.C. The 24-year-old dominant centre back, who won the club's Young Player of the season, had been instrumental in helping the Rovers secure back-to-back promotion to the 2019–20 EFL League One. Monthé turned down interest from numerous clubs to remain at Prenton Park. During the 2019–20 EFL League One season Monthé made 31 league starts scoring 1 goal, being involved in Tranmere's 2019–20 FA Cup run scoring two goals in the third round tie against Watford F.C. setting up a fourth round tie and losing against Manchester United F.C.

During the 2019–2020 season with new variant of COVID-19 Tranmere Rovers F.C. were regulated to League Two by PPG. Monthé went on to impress and make over 40 appearances for Tranmere Rovers F.C. in 2020–21 EFL League Two season which concluded in defeat in the EFL League Two play-offs to Morecambe

=== Walsall ===
On 14 June 2021, Monthé agreed a deal to join Walsall, signing a two-year contract.

He was released by the club at the end of the 2022–23 season.

=== Northampton Town ===
On 14 July 2023, Monthé signed for newly promoted League One club Northampton Town on a two-year deal.

=== Oldham Athletic ===
On 2 July 2024, Monthé joined National League side Oldham Athletic on a free transfer.

== Career statistics ==
As of match played 27 April 2024

Appearances and goals by club, season and competition
| Club | Season | League | | | FA Cup | | League Cup | | Other | | Total | |
| Club | Season | Division | Apps | Goals | Apps | Goals | Apps | Goals | Apps | Goals | Apps | Goals |
|---|---|---|---|---|---|---|---|---|---|---|---|---|
| Forest Green Rovers | 2016–17 | National League | 13 | 1 | 0 | 0 | — | | 3 (Note: Appearances in National League play-offs) | 0 | 16 | 1 |
| Forest Green Rovers | 2017–18 | League Two | 13 | 0 | 2 | 0 | 1 | 0 | 4 (Note: Appearance in EFL Trophy) | 0 | 20 | 0 |
| Forest Green Rovers | Total | | 26 | 1 | 2 | 0 | 1 | 0 | 7 | 0 | 36 | 1 |
| Tranmere Rovers (loan) | 2017–18 | National League | 4 | 0 | — | | — | | 2 (Note: Appearances in National League play-offs) | 0 | 6 | 0 |
| Tranmere Rovers | 2018–19 | League Two | 43 | 2 | 5 | 0 | 1 | 0 | 5 (Note: Two appearances in EFL Trophy, three in League Two play-offs) | 0 | 54 | 2 |
| Tranmere Rovers | 2019–20 | League One | 31 | 1 | 6 | 2 | 1 | 0 | 1 | 0 | 39 | 3 |
| Tranmere Rovers | 2020–21 | League Two | 34 | 0 | 3 | 0 | 1 | 0 | 6 (Note: Four appearances in EFL Trophy, two in League Two play-offs) | 0 | 44 | 0 |
| Tranmere Rovers | Total | | 112 | 3 | 14 | 2 | 3 | 0 | 14 | 0 | 143 | 5 |
| Walsall | 2021–22 | League Two | 37 | 0 | 2 | 0 | 0 | 0 | 2 | 0 | 41 | 0 |
| Walsall | 2022–23 | League Two | 44 | 2 | 3 | 0 | 2 | 0 | 3 | 0 | 52 | 2 |
| Walsall | Total | | 81 | 2 | 5 | 0 | 2 | 0 | 5 | 0 | 93 | 2 |
| Northampton Town | 2023–24 | League One | 34 | 1 | 1 | 0 | 1 | 0 | 3 | 1 | 39 | 2 |
| Career total | | | 253 | 7 | 22 | 2 | 7 | 0 | 29 | 1 | 311 | 10 |

== Honours ==
Forest Green Rovers

- National League play-offs: 2017

Tranmere Rovers

- National League play-offs: 2018
- EFL League Two play-offs: 2019
- EFL Trophy runner-up: 2020–21

Oldham Athletic

- National League play-offs: 2025
