= Corey Blackett-Taylor =

English footballer (born 1997)

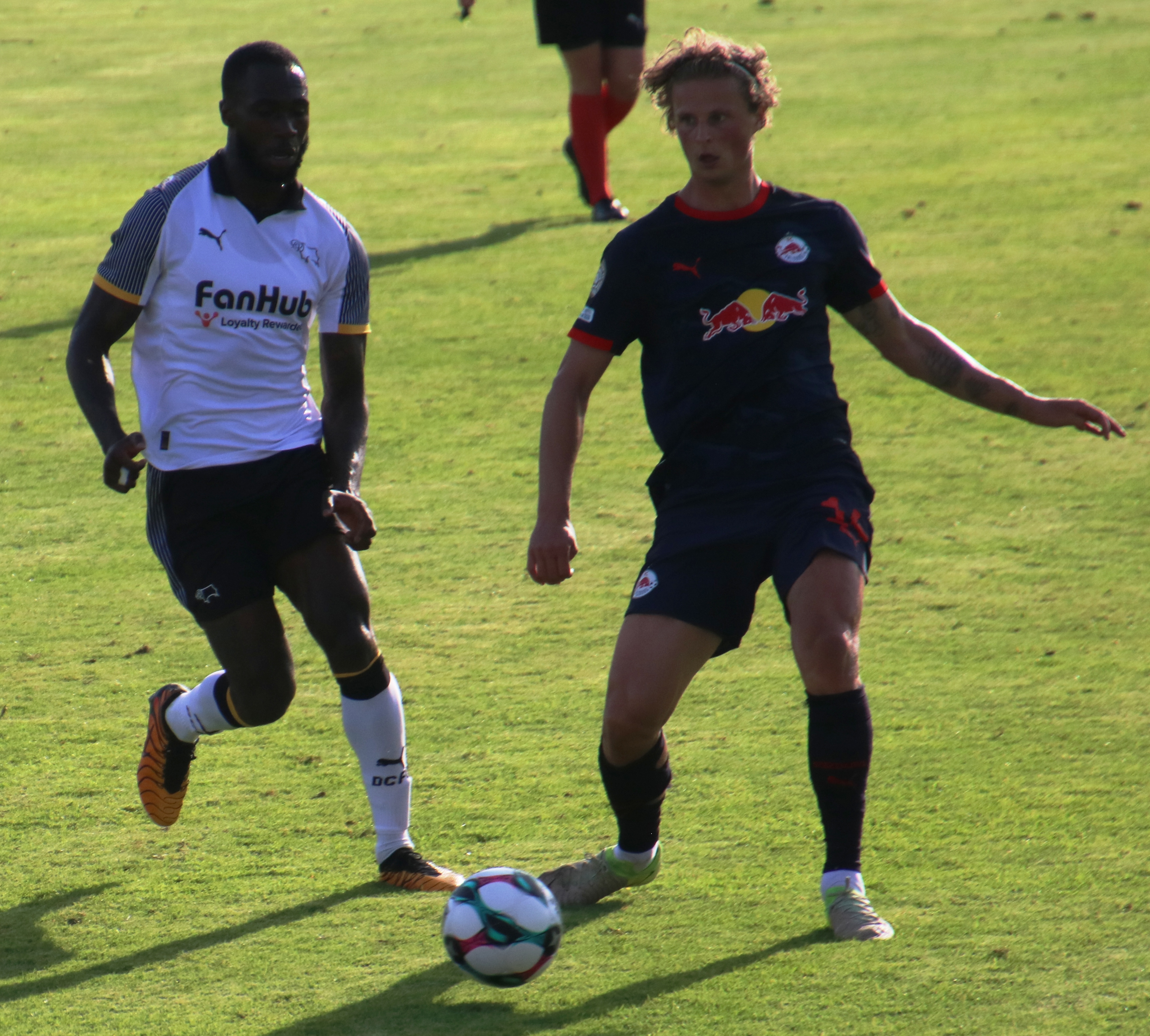
- Corey Blackett-Taylor (left) playing for Derby County in 2025.

Personal information
- Full name: Corey Josiah Paul Blackett-Taylor
- Date of birth: 23 September 1997 (age 29)
- Place of birth: Erdington, England
- Height: 6 ft 0 in (1.82 m)
- Positions: Winger; attacking midfielder

Team information
- Current team: Derby County
- Number: 33

Youth career
- 2007–2016: Aston Villa

Senior career*
Years	Team	Apps	(Gls)
2016–2019	Aston Villa	1	(0)
2019	→ Walsall (loan)	10	(0)
2019–2021	Tranmere Rovers	44	(3)
2021–2024	Charlton Athletic	81	(18)
2024	→ Derby County (loan)	12	(0)
2024–	Derby County	29	(1)
2026	→ Bolton Wanderers (loan)	7	(2)

International career^{‡}
2013	England U19	4	(2)
- * Club domestic league appearances and goals as of 16:18, 17 October 2026 (UTC) ‡ National team caps and goals as of 14:00, 9 March 2017 (UTC)

Corey Josiah Paul Blackett-Taylor (born 23 September 1997) is an English professional footballer who plays for EFL Championship club Derby County.

Blackett-Taylor started his career at Aston Villa where he graduated into the first team making his debut in March 2017. In March 2019, he would join Walsall on loan. In June 2019 after he released by Villa, Blackett-Taylor signed with Tranmere Rovers, before joining Charlton Athletic in January 2022. In January 2024, he joined Derby County loan, a move which became permanent on 1 July 2024. In January 2026, Blackett-Taylor joined Bolton Wanderers on loan.

He has represented England at Under-19 level.

== Career ==
=== Aston Villa ===
Blackett-Taylor joined Aston Villa and worked his way up through the team's academy age groups. In the 2015–16 season he scored five goals in his opening nine matches for the Villa Under-18s side and was later selected for the annual international seven-a-side tournament, the Hong Kong Soccer Sevens, which Villa won for the record sixth time. He was named on the first team bench for a Football League Cup match against Notts County by Tim Sherwood in August 2015 but did not take part. Villa won 5–3 in extra time.

Blackett-Taylor was named on the bench for a league match the first time on 7 March 2017 and replaced Neil Taylor to make his debut in the 87th minute in a 1–0 loss to Huddersfield Town. Blackett-Taylor made his second and final appearance for Villa in a 2–0 EFL Cup loss to Middlesbrough in September 2017. In April 2018, Aston Villa announced a one-year contract extension for Blackett-Taylor. Blackett-Taylor left Villa upon the expiry of his contract in June 2019.

==== Walsall (loan) ====
On 31 January 2019, Blackett-Taylor was loaned out to Walsall, of League One until the end of the 2018–19 season. Blackett-Taylor would make 10 appearances during his spell at Walsall.

=== Tranmere Rovers ===
On 26 June 2019, Blackett-Taylor signed a two-year contract with newly promoted League One side Tranmere Rovers. He made his debut on 17 September 2019, in a 2–2 home draw against Peterborough United. Blackett-Taylor scored his first professional goal on 13 October 2019, a late winner in a 1–0 away victory over Coventry City. Blackett-Taylor would score five goals and create six assists in the 2019–20 season, as Tranmere were relegated to League Two.

In the 2020–21 season, Blackett-Taylor would score three times and created three assists in 28 appearances and would also play in the 2021 EFL Trophy final. Blackett-Taylor left Tranmere at the end of his contract in July 2021.

=== Charlton Athletic ===
On 20 August 2021, Blackett-Taylor joined Charlton Athletic on a short-term deal until January 2022. He scored his first goal for Charlton in a 6–1 EFL Trophy tie victory against Crawley Town on 31 August 2021. On 18 November 2021, it was announced that Blackett-Taylor had signed an extension to his contract at Charlton Athletic until at least 2023. In his first season at Charlton, Blackett-Taylor scored three goals.

In the 2022–23 season, Blackett-Taylor again became a mainstay in the Charlton side and increased his goal output with scoring eight goals and making three assists in 35 appearances, during this season in March 2023, Charlton activated an option to extend Blackett-Taylor's contract until June 2024.

In the 2023–24 season, Blackett-Taylor had a productive season scoring nine goals and creating seven assists in 28 appearances across all competitions. Blackett-Taylor's performances earned praise from Charlton's manager Michael Appleton.`

==== Derby County (loan) ====
In January 2024, Charlton rejected a transfer bid for Blackett-Taylor, believed to be from fellow League One club Derby County. On 19 January 2024, it was reported that an improved bid by Derby was accepted by Charlton.

On 22 January 2024, Blackett-Taylor joined Derby County until the end of the season ahead of signing for the club on a permanent basis in the summer, on a contract until June 2027. A day later, Blackett-Taylor replaced Tom Barkhuizen to make his debut in the 64th minute in a 1–0 loss to Reading. Blackett-Taylor struggled to break into the Derby team; missing an open goal in a 0–0 draw at Wycombe Wanderers on 10 April 2024. He made 12 appearances for Derby during the 2023–24 season as they gained promotion to the Championship as runners-up, though Blackett-Taylor himself did little to contribute to this.

=== Derby County ===
After Blackett-Taylor's loan finished and he signed permanently for Derby on 1 July 2024. Blackett-Taylor sustained an injury in pre-season which ruled him out for first month of the season; upon his return he found it hard to break into the matchday squad. Blackett-Taylor would score his first goal in Derby's 3–2 loss to Norwich City on 28 September 2024. Blackett-Taylor sustained a hamstring injury against Cardiff City on 25 January 2025. He returned to fitness in April 2025. Blackett-Taylor made 13 appearances, scoring once during the 2024–25 season.

Ahead of the 2025–26 season Blackett-Taylor hit impressive form during pre-season, scoring in each of Derby's five pre-season friendlies. Blackett-Taylor started Derby first game of the season against Stoke City and provided the assist to Derby's only goal of the match scored by Carlton Morris, however in the same game he was forced off the pitch with a hamstring injury which after tests was confirmed would leave him out of action for six weeks. He returned to first team action after two months and played 10 times for the first team during the season.

==== Bolton Wanderers (loan) ====
On 27 January 2026, Blackett-Taylor joined League One side Bolton Wanderers on loan until the end of the season. On 31 January 2026, Blackett-Taylor scored on his Bolton debut, scoring the only goal in a 1–0 win at AFC Wimbledon. On 14 March 2026, Blackett-Taylor sustained a thigh injury in Bolton's match at Rotherham United, results from a scan after this match were described as "serious" and Blackett-Taylor returned to Derby for rehabilitation after scoring twice from seven appearances at Bolton Wanderers. Bolton won promotion to the Championship at the end of the season via the play-offs.

== Personal life ==
Blackett-Taylor attended Handsworth Grammar School and donated both an England and Aston Villa shirt to the school having signed his first professional contract with Villa in 2016. His older brother, Daryl Taylor, is a former professional footballer and strength coach.

== Career statistics ==
As of match played 17 October 2026

Appearances and goals by club, season and competition
Club	Season	League			FA Cup		League Cup		Other		Total	
Club	Season	Division	Apps	Goals	Apps	Goals	Apps	Goals	Apps	Goals	Apps	Goals
Aston Villa	2016–17	Championship	1	0	0	0	0	0	0	0	1	0
Aston Villa	2017–18	Championship	0	0	0	0	1	0	0	0	1	0
Aston Villa	2018–19	Championship	0	0	0	0	0	0	0	0	0	0
Aston Villa	Total		1	0	0	0	1	0	0	0	2	0
Walsall (loan)	2018–19	League One	10	0	0	0	0	0	0	0	10	0
Tranmere Rovers	2019–20	League One	24	2	6	2	1	0	3 (Note: Appearance(s) in EFL Trophy)	1	34	5
Tranmere Rovers	2020–21	League Two	20	1	3	1	1	0	4 (Note: Appearance(s) in League Two Play-Offs)	1	28	3
Tranmere Rovers	Total		44	3	9	3	2	0	7	2	62	8
Charlton Athletic	2021–22	League One	27	2	2	0	0	0	5	1	34	3
Charlton Athletic	2022–23	League One	29	8	2	0	3	0	1	0	35	8
Charlton Athletic	2023–24	League One	25	8	2	0	0	0	1	1	28	9
Charlton Athletic	Total		81	18	6	0	3	0	7	2	97	20
Derby County (loan)	2023–24	League One	12	0	0	0	0	0	0	0	12	0
Derby County	2024–25	Championship	12	1	1	0	0	0	0	0	13	1
Derby County	2025–26	Championship	9	0	1	0	0	0	0	0	10	0
Derby County	2026–27	Championship	8	0	0	0	1	0	0	0	9	0
Derby County	Total		41	1	2	0	1	0	0	0	44	1
Bolton Wanderers (loan)	2025–26	League One	7	2	0	0	0	0	0	0	7	2
Career total			184	24	17	3	7	0	14	4	282	31

== Honours ==
Aston Villa U23s

- Premier League Cup: 2017–18

Tranmere Rovers

- EFL Trophy runner-up: 2020–21

Derby County

- EFL League One second-place promotion: 2023–24
