= Morgan Ferrier =

Guyanese footballer (born 1994)

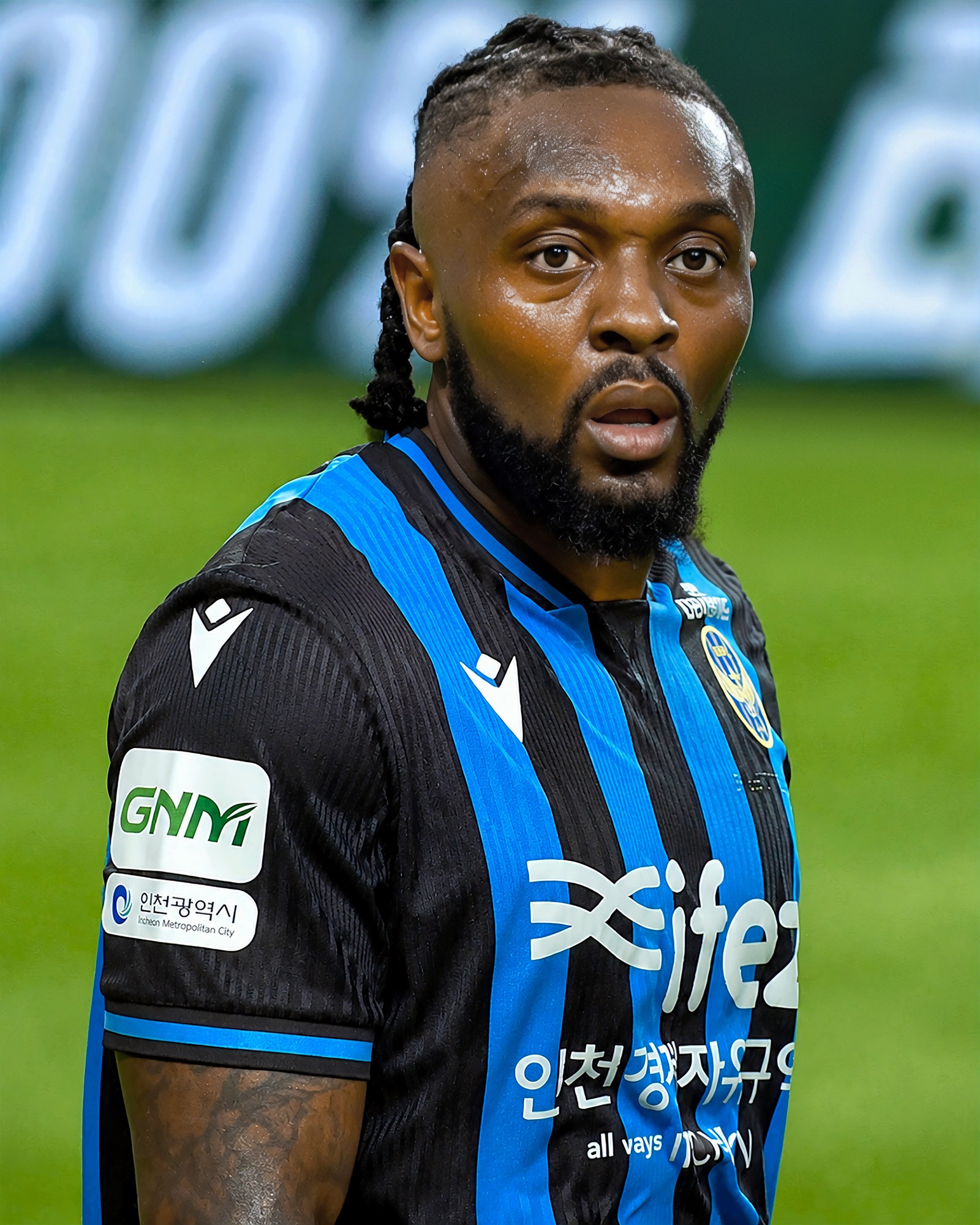
- Ferrier in 2026

Personal information
- Full name: Morgan James Ferrier
- Date of birth: 15 November 1994 (age 31)
- Place of birth: Plaistow, England
- Height: 1.85 m (6 ft 1 in)
- Positions: Winger; forward

Team information
- Current team: Incheon United
- Number: 99

Youth career
- 2003–2011: Arsenal
- 2011–2012: Watford

Senior career*
Years	Team	Apps	(Gls)
2012–2013	Nottingham Forest	0	(0)
2013	→ Kettering Town (loan)		
2013–2014	Cray Wanderers	5	(0)
2014–2015	Crystal Palace	0	(0)
2015–2016	Bishop's Stortford	19	(5)
2016	Hemel Hempstead Town	9	(2)
2016–2017	Boreham Wood	30	(11)
2017–2018	Dagenham & Redbridge	30	(8)
2018	Boreham Wood	15	(7)
2018–2019	Walsall	33	(5)
2019–2021	Tranmere Rovers	30	(5)
2021	Maccabi Petah Tikva	14	(1)
2021–2022	Ironi Kiryat Shmona	26	(3)
2022–2023	Nakhon Ratchasima	19	(4)
2023	Al Urooba		
2024	Hapoel Acre	11	(5)
2024–2025	Omonia Aradippou	22	(6)
2025–2026	AEL Limassol	12	(3)
2026–	Incheon United	16	(5)

International career^{‡}
2017	England C	3	(0)
2025–	Guyana	2	(0)
- * Club domestic league appearances and goals as of 10:32, 23 July 2026 (UTC) ‡ National team caps and goals as of 00:53, 26 March 2025 (UTC)

Morgan James Ferrier (born 15 November 1994) is a professional footballer who plays as a winger or a forward for Incheon United. Born in England, he represents the Guyana national team.

== Club career ==
Born in Plaistow, Newham, Ferrier played youth football with Arsenal, Watford and Nottingham Forest. In January 2013 he was sent out to Southern League Premier Division side Kettering Town on a three-month loan. After leaving Nottingham Forest he briefly went on trial with Bolton Wanderers.

He played briefly for Cray Wanderers in the Isthmian League Premier Division in 2013–14. He then joined Crystal Palace, and spent time with Bishop's Stortford and Hemel Hempstead Town before signing for Boreham Wood in August 2016. He was put up for sale in May 2017, and spent time with Dagenham & Redbridge before returning to Boreham Wood in February 2018. Boreham Wood later accused Ferrier's agent of "bullying".

He signed for Walsall in August 2018.

He moved to Tranmere Rovers on 1 August 2019 for an undisclosed transfer fee. In August 2019 he suffered a knee ligament injury and would be on the sidelines for 8 weeks.

On 11 February 2021, Ferrier joined Israeli Premier League side Maccabi Petah Tikva for an undisclosed fee.

On 24 June 2021 he signed for Ironi Kiryat Shmona.

In August 2022, Ferrier announced on his Instagram account that he had joined Thai League 1 side Nakhon Ratchasima.

On 13 August 2023, Ferrier joined UAE First Division League side Al Urooba.

On 22 January 2024, Ferrier returned to Israel to sign for Hapoel Acre. Later that day, he scored twice on his debut during a 2–2 draw with Hapoel Umm al-Fahm.

In July 2024, Ferrier joined newly promoted Cypriot First Division side Omonia Aradippou.

In June 2025, Ferrier joined Cypriot First Division side AEL Limassol. On 29 January 2026, he left the club by mutual consent. The following week, he joined K League 1 side Incheon United.

== International career ==
Ferrier has played for England C. In March 2025, he received his first call-up to the Guyana national team for their 2025 CONCACAF Gold Cup qualification matches.

== Career statistics ==
As of 1 June 2024

Appearances and goals by club, season and competition
Club	Season	League			National Cup		League Cup		Other		Total	
Club	Season	Division	Apps	Goals	Apps	Goals	Apps	Goals	Apps	Goals	Apps	Goals
Bishop's Stortford	2015–16	National League South	19	5	0	0	—		1 (Note: Appearance(s) in the FA Trophy.)	0	20	5
Hemel Hempstead Town	2015–16	National League South	9	2	0	0	—		—		9	2
Boreham Wood	2016–17	National League	30	11	3	2	—		4	1	37	14
Dagenham & Redbridge	2017–18	National League	30	8	2	0	—		1	0	33	8
Boreham Wood	2017–18	National League	15	7	0	0	—		0	0	15	7
Walsall	2018–19	League One	33	5	3	0	1	1	2 (Note: Appearance(s) in the EFL Trophy.)	0	39	6
Tranmere Rovers	2019–20	League One	20	5	6	4	1	0	1	0	28	9
Tranmere Rovers	2020–21	League Two	10	0	1	0	1	0	3	1	15	1
Tranmere Rovers	Total		30	5	7	4	2	0	4	1	43	10
Maccabi Petah Tikva	2020–21	Israeli Premier League	14	1	1	0	—		—		15	1
Ironi Kiryat Shmona	2021–22	Israeli Premier League	26	3	2	2	4	0	—		32	5
Nakhon Ratchasima	2022–23	Thai League 1	19	4	3	2	0	0	—		22	6
Hapoel Acre	2023–24	Liga Leumit	11	5	0	0	0	0	—		11	5
Omonia Aradippou	2024–25	Cypriot First Division	0	0	0	0	0	0	—		0	0
Career total			236	56	21	10	7	1	12	2	276	69
